= 2013 Alberta Scotties Tournament of Hearts =

- Host city: Lethbridge, Alberta
- Arena: Lethbridge Curling Club
- Dates: January 23–27
- Winner: Team Moore
- Curling club: Grande Prairie CC, Grande Prairie
- Skip: Kristie Moore
- Third: Blaine Richards
- Second: Michelle Trarback
- Lead: Amber Cheveldave
- Finalist: Renée Sonnenberg

The 2013 Alberta Scotties Tournament of Hearts, Alberta's women's provincial curling championship, was held from January 23 to 27 at the Lethbridge Curling Club in Lethbridge, Alberta. The winning Kristie Moore rink from Grande Prairie went on to represent Alberta at the 2013 Scotties Tournament of Hearts in Kingston, Ontario.

== Qualification ==
Twelve teams will qualify for the provincial tournament through several berths. The qualification process is as follows:

Qualification method	Berths	Qualifying team
Runner-up from 2012 Alberta Scotties	1	Jessie Kaufman
CTRS points leader at the end of previous season	1	Crystal Webster
CTRS points leader from current season, as of December 3	1	Shannon Kleibrink
Alberta Women's Tour points leader after final event, December 3	1	Renée Sonnenberg
Northern Alberta Curling Association Qualifier (Jan. 3–6)	3	Laura Crocker; Tiffany Game; Val Sweeting
Southern Alberta Curling Association Qualifier (Jan. 4–7)	3	Casey Scheidegger; Teryn Hamilton; Lisa Eyamie
Peace Curling Association Qualifier (Jan. 4–6)	2	Kristie Moore; Delia DeJong

== Teams ==
Skip	Third	Second	Lead	Locale
Jessie Kaufman	Nicky Kaufman	Kelly Erickson	Stephanie Enright	Saville Sports Centre, Edmonton
Crystal Webster	Erin Carmody	Geri-Lynn Ramsay	Samantha Preston	Calgary Curling Club, Calgary
Shannon Kleibrink	Bronwen Webster	Kalynn Park	Chelsey Matson	Calgary Winter Club, Calgary
Renée Sonnenberg	Lawnie MacDonald	Cary-Anne Sallows	Rona Pasika	Grande Prairie Curling Club, Grande Prairie
Laura Crocker	Sarah Wilkes	Rebecca Pattison	Jen Gates	Saville Sports Centre, Edmonton
Tiffany Game	Vanessa Pouliot	Jennifer Van Wieren	Melissa Pierce	Crestwood Curling Club, Edmonton
Val Sweeting	Dana Ferguson	Joanne Taylor	Rachelle Pidherny	Saville Sports Centre, Edmonton
Casey Scheidegger	Denise Kinghorn	Jessie Scheidegger	Kim Anderson	Lethbridge Curling Club, Lethbridge
Teryn Hamilton	Sandi Weber	Jody Keim	Heather Hansen	Calgary Winter Club, Calgary
Lisa Eyamie	Maria Bushell	Jodi Marthaller	Valerie Hamende	Milo Curling Club, Milo
Kristie Moore	Blaine Richards	Michelle Trarback	Amber Cheveldave	Grande Prairie Curling Club, Grande Prairie
Delia DeJong	Stephanie Yanishewski	Janelle Sakamoto	Heather Stewart	Sexsmith Curling Club, Sexsmith

== Knockout Draw Brackets ==
=== A event ===
First Knockout
Lisa Eyamie	8
Tiffany Game	10
Val Sweeting	8
Delia DeJong	6
Jessie Kaufman	10
Teryn Hamilton	9
Casey Scheidegger	9
Kristie Moore	3

Quarterfinals
Shannon Kleibrink	4
Tiffany Game	7
Val Sweeting	8
Laura Crocker	6
Renée Sonnenberg	8
Jessie Kaufman	6
Casey Scheidegger	6
Crystal Webster	3

Semifinals
Tiffany Game	6
Val Sweeting	7
Renée Sonnenberg	7
Casey Scheidegger	1

A Qualifier
Val Sweeting	7
Renée Sonnenberg	9

=== B event ===
Second Knockout
Lisa Eyamie	7
Laura Crocker	8
Jessie Kaufman	10
Delia DeJong	3
Teryn Hamilton	5
Crystal Webster	6
Kristie Moore	6
Shannon Kleibrink	8

Quarterfinals
Casey Scheidegger	3
Laura Crocker	6
Tiffany Game	6
Jessie Kaufman	9
Crystal Webster	4
Shannon Kleibrink	5

Semifinals
Laura Crocker	8
Jessie Kaufman	7
Val Sweeting	6
Shannon Kleibrink	4

B Qualifier
Laura Crocker	7
Val Sweeting	4

=== C event ===
Third Knockout		Semifinals		C Qualifier 1
		Shannon Kleibrink	6
Lisa Eyamie	10	Lisa Eyamie	3
Delia DeJong	6			Shannon Kleibrink	4
				Jessie Kaufman	3
		Crystal Webster	5
		Jessie Kaufman	6

Third Knockout		Semifinals		C Qualifier 2
Casey Scheidegger	4
Teryn Hamilton	5	Teryn Hamilton	4
Tiffany Game	3	Kristie Moore	9
Kristie Moore	8			Kristie Moore	8
				Val Sweeting	7

== Knockout results ==
All draw times are listed in Mountain Standard Time (UTC−7).

=== Draw 1 ===
Wednesday, January 23, 9:30 am

Sheet A	1	2	3	4	5	6	7	8	9	10	Final
Jessie Kaufman	0	4	0	0	2	0	1	1	0	2	10
Teryn Hamilton	0	0	3	2	0	2	0	0	2	0	9

Sheet B	1	2	3	4	5	6	7	8	9	10	Final
Val Sweeting	0	4	0	1	0	1	0	2	0	X	8
Delia DeJong	1	0	1	0	3	0	0	0	1	X	6

Sheet C	1	2	3	4	5	6	7	8	9	10	Final
Lisa Eyamie	0	1	0	1	0	3	1	0	2	0	8
Tiffany Game	1	0	4	0	2	0	0	2	0	1	10

Sheet D	1	2	3	4	5	6	7	8	9	10	Final
Casey Scheidegger	0	2	2	0	3	0	1	1	X	X	9
Kristie Moore	0	0	0	1	0	2	0	0	X	X	3

=== Draw 2 ===
Wednesday, January 23, 6:30 pm

Sheet A	1	2	3	4	5	6	7	8	9	10	Final
Val Sweeting	2	1	0	1	0	2	0	1	0	1	8
Laura Crocker	0	0	2	0	1	0	2	0	1	0	6

Sheet B	1	2	3	4	5	6	7	8	9	10	Final
Shannon Kleibrink	0	0	1	1	0	1	0	1	0	X	4
Tiffany Game	1	1	0	0	1	0	1	0	3	X	7

Sheet C	1	2	3	4	5	6	7	8	9	10	Final
Casey Scheidegger	0	0	2	1	1	0	1	0	1	X	6
Crystal Webster	1	1	0	0	0	0	0	1	0	X	3

Sheet D	1	2	3	4	5	6	7	8	9	10	Final
Renée Sonnenberg	0	0	1	0	2	4	0	1	0	X	8
Jessie Kaufman	0	0	0	2	0	0	3	0	1	X	6

=== Draw 3 ===
Thursday, January 24, 9:00 am

Sheet B	1	2	3	4	5	6	7	8	9	10	Final
Renée Sonnenberg	1	1	0	1	2	1	1	X	X	X	7
Casey Scheidegger	0	0	1	0	0	0	0	X	X	X	1

Sheet D	1	2	3	4	5	6	7	8	9	10	11	Final
Tiffany Game	0	0	0	2	1	0	1	1	0	1	0	6
Val Sweeting	0	2	0	0	0	1	0	0	3	0	1	7

=== Draw 4 ===
Thursday, January 24, 2:00 pm

Sheet A	1	2	3	4	5	6	7	8	9	10	Final
Kristie Moore	0	0	0	3	0	1	0	2	0	0	6
Shannon Kleibrink	0	0	2	0	2	0	1	0	2	1	8

Sheet B	1	2	3	4	5	6	7	8	9	10	Final
Teryn Hamilton	0	0	1	0	1	1	0	0	2	0	5
Crystal Webster	0	0	0	0	0	0	3	2	0	1	6

Sheet C	1	2	3	4	5	6	7	8	9	10	Final
Jessie Kaufman	0	0	2	2	0	2	0	4	X	X	10
Delia DeJong	1	0	0	0	1	0	1	0	X	X	3

Sheet D	1	2	3	4	5	6	7	8	9	10	Final
Lisa Eyamie	0	0	1	0	3	0	2	0	1	0	7
Laura Crocker	1	1	0	1	0	1	0	2	0	2	8

=== Draw 5 ===
Thursday, January 24, 6:30 pm

Sheet A	1	2	3	4	5	6	7	8	9	10	Final
Laura Crocker	1	1	0	1	0	1	0	0	2	X	6
Casey Scheidegger	0	0	1	0	1	0	1	0	0	X	3

Sheet B	1	2	3	4	5	6	7	8	9	10	Final
Jessie Kaufman	0	1	0	0	2	0	3	0	0	3	9
Tiffany Game	0	0	1	0	0	2	0	2	1	0	6

Sheet C	1	2	3	4	5	6	7	8	9	10	Final
Val Sweeting	0	1	1	1	0	0	4	0	0	0	7
Renée Sonnenberg	2	0	0	0	3	1	0	1	1	1	9

Sheet D	1	2	3	4	5	6	7	8	9	10	Final
Crystal Webster	0	1	0	0	1	1	0	0	0	1	4
Shannon Kleibrink	1	0	1	0	0	0	0	2	1	0	5

=== Draw 6 ===
Friday, January 25, 9:00 am

Sheet A	1	2	3	4	5	6	7	8	9	10	Final
Lisa Eyamie	0	4	0	1	0	1	2	0	1	1	10
Delia DeJong	1	0	1	0	1	0	0	3	0	0	6

Sheet C	1	2	3	4	5	6	7	8	9	10	Final
Kristie Moore	1	0	2	0	2	0	0	3	X	X	8
Tiffany Game	0	1	0	1	0	0	1	0	X	X	3

Sheet D	1	2	3	4	5	6	7	8	9	10	Final
Teryn Hamilton	1	0	0	1	0	1	1	0	0	1	5
Casey Scheidegger	0	2	0	0	1	0	0	1	0	0	4

=== Draw 7 ===
Friday, January 25, 2:00 pm

Sheet B	1	2	3	4	5	6	7	8	9	10	Final
Shannon Kleibrink	1	1	0	1	0	0	1	0	0	0	4
Val Sweeting	0	0	1	0	0	1	0	0	2	2	6

Sheet D	1	2	3	4	5	6	7	8	9	10	11	Final
Laura Crocker	0	1	0	2	0	3	0	0	1	0	1	8
Jessie Kaufman	0	0	1	0	2	0	1	1	0	2	0	7

=== Draw 8 ===
Friday, January 25, 6:30 pm

Sheet A	1	2	3	4	5	6	7	8	9	10	11	Final
Crystal Webster	0	0	0	0	2	1	0	2	0	0	0	5
Jessie Kaufman	0	1	0	1	0	0	1	0	1	1	1	6

Sheet B	1	2	3	4	5	6	7	8	9	10	Final
Teryn Hamilton	0	1	0	0	2	0	1	0	X	X	4
Kristie Moore	1	0	2	0	0	4	0	2	X	X	9

Sheet C	1	2	3	4	5	6	7	8	9	10	Final
Laura Crocker	0	1	0	0	2	0	0	2	2	X	7
Val Sweeting	0	0	2	1	0	0	1	0	0	X	4

Sheet D	1	2	3	4	5	6	7	8	9	10	Final
Shannon Kleibrink	0	0	0	2	0	0	3	0	1	0	6
Lisa Eyamie	0	0	0	0	0	1	0	1	0	1	3

=== Draw 9 ===
Saturday, January 26, 1:00 pm

Team	1	2	3	4	5	6	7	8	9	10	Final
Shannon Kleibrink	1	0	0	0	0	0	2	0	0	1	4
Jessie Kaufman	0	0	0	0	0	1	0	0	2	0	3

Team	1	2	3	4	5	6	7	8	9	10	11	Final
Kristie Moore	0	0	1	2	0	3	0	0	0	1	1	8
Val Sweeting	1	1	0	0	2	0	1	0	2	0	0	7

== Playoffs ==
Page playoff system
A1	Renée Sonnenberg	10
B1	Laura Crocker	3
C1	Shannon Kleibrink	2
C2	Kristie Moore	8

Semifinal
B1	Laura Crocker	5
C2	Kristie Moore	6

Final
A1	Renée Sonnenberg	7
C2	Kristie Moore	8

=== A1 vs. B1 ===
Saturday, January 26, 6:30 pm

Sheet C	1	2	3	4	5	6	7	8	9	10	Final
Renée Sonnenberg	0	2	2	0	1	0	3	2	X	X	10
Laura Crocker	0	0	0	1	0	2	0	0	X	X	3

=== C1 vs. C2 ===
Saturday, January 26, 6:30 pm

Sheet A	1	2	3	4	5	6	7	8	9	10	Final
Shannon Kleibrink	0	1	0	0	0	0	0	1	0	X	2
Kristie Moore	1	0	0	0	2	2	1	0	2	X	8

=== Semifinal ===
Sunday, January 27, 9:30 am

Sheet B	1	2	3	4	5	6	7	8	9	10	Final
Laura Crocker	0	1	0	0	1	0	2	0	1	0	5
Kristie Moore	0	0	1	1	0	2	0	1	0	1	6

=== Final ===
Sunday, January 27, 2:00 pm

Sheet C	1	2	3	4	5	6	7	8	9	10	11	Final
Renée Sonnenberg	2	0	0	0	2	0	0	1	0	2	0	7
Kristie Moore	0	0	1	1	0	2	2	0	1	0	1	8

== Qualification events ==
=== Northern Alberta Curling Association ===
The Northern Alberta Curling Association qualification event for the 2013 Alberta Scotties Tournament of Hearts took place from January 3 to 6 at the Cold Lake Curling Club in Cold Lake. The event qualified three teams to the provincial playdowns.

==== Teams ====
The teams are listed as follows:

Skip	Third	Second	Lead	Locale
Brenda Brouwer	Susan Ouellette-Milliken	Crista Perepelitza	Janice Gervais	Cold Lake Curling Club, Cold Lake
Chana Martineau	Pamela Appelman	Brittany Zelmer	Jennifer Sheehan	Saville Sports Centre, Edmonton
Holly Whyte	Deena Benoit	Cori Dunbar	Heather Steele	Avonair Curling Club, Avonair
Laura Crocker	Sarah Wilkes	Rebecca Pattison	Jen Gates	Saville Sports Centre, Edmonton
Lindsay Makichuk	Amanda Coderre	Amy Janko	Kristina Hadder	Saville Sports Centre, Edmonton
Nola Zingel	Heather Kuntz	Jill Watson	Melissa McKee	Lloydminster Curling Club, Lloydminster
Pam Sakaluk	Tana Martin	Treene Meier	Sandra Dawes	St. Paul Curling Club, St. Paul
Tiffany Game	Vanessa Pouliot	Jennifer Van Wieren	Melissa Pierce	Crestwood Curling Club, Edmonton
Tiffany Steuber	Megan Anderson	Lisa Miller	Cindy Westgard	Thistle Curling Club, Edmonton
Val Sweeting	Dana Ferguson	Joanne Taylor	Rachelle Pidherny	Saville Sports Centre, Edmonton

==== Results ====
The draw is listed as follows:

A Event
Pam Sakaluk	11
Nola Zingel	4
Brenda Brouwer	7
Lindsay Makichuk	6

Quarterfinals
Tiffany Game	7
Holly Whyte	4
Laura Crocker	8
Nola Zingel	5
Tiffany Steuber	10
Chana Martineau	1
Val Sweeting	10
Brenda Brouwer	3

Semifinals
Tiffany Game	7
Laura Crocker	8
Tiffany Steuber	3
Val Sweeting	7

Qualifier 1
Laura Crocker	6
Val Sweeting	4

B Event
Lindsay Makichuk	3
Chana Martineau	10
Pam Sakaluk	4
Holly Whyte	10

Quarterfinals
Nola Zingel	4
Tiffany Steuber	8
Tiffany Game	8
Chana Martineau	1
Brenda Brouwer	9
Holly Whyte	12

Semifinals
Tiffany Steuber	3
Tiffany Game	8
Val Sweeting	6
Holly Whyte	9

Qualifier 2
Tiffany Game	7
Holly Whyte	6

C Event
Pam Sakaluk	6
Lindsay Makichuk	4

Quarterfinals
Pam Sakaluk	10
Nola Zingel	7
Brenda Brouwer	8
Chana Martineau	7
Tiffany Steuber	5
Val Sweeting	10

Semifinals
Pam Sakaluk	2
Holly Whyte	6
Brenda Brouwer	3
Val Sweeting	6

Qualifier 3
Holly Whyte	5
Val Sweeting	10

=== Southern Alberta Curling Association ===
The Southern Alberta Curling Association qualification event for the 2013 Alberta Scotties Tournament of Hearts is taking place from January 3 to 6 at the Glencoe Curling Club in Calgary. The event will qualify three teams to the provincial playdowns.

==== Teams ====
The teams are listed as follows:

Skip	Locale(s)
Teryn Hamilton	Calgary Curling Club, Calgary
Heather Jensen	Airdrie Curling Club, Airdrie
Nikki Smith	Calgary Curling Club, Calgary
Casey Scheidegger	Lethbridge Curling Club, Lethbridge
Amy Nixon	Glencoe Curling Club, Calgary; Red Deer Curling Club, Red Deer
Lisa Eyamie	Milo Curling Club, Milo
Tanilla Doyle	Highwood Curling Club, High River
Morgan Muise	Calgary Curling Club, Calgary
Cheryl Bernard	Calgary Curling Club, Calgary; Glencoe Curling Club, Calgary
Norma Brown	Strathmore Curling Club, Strathmore
Jacqueline Brett	Calgary Winter Club, Calgary

==== Results ====
A Event
Morgan Muise	11
Tanilla Doyle	2
Teryn Hamilton	8
Norma Brown	4
Nikki Smith	9
Jacqueline Brett	8

Quarterfinals
Morgan Muise	3
Cheryl Bernard	7
Teryn Hamilton	8
Lisa Eyamie	7
Nikki Smith	3
Casey Scheidegger	9
Amy Nixon	7
Heather Jensen	5

Semifinals
Cheryl Bernard	2
Teryn Hamilton	5
Casey Scheidegger	7
Amy Nixon	5

Qualifier 1
Teryn Hamilton	1
Casey Scheidegger	7

B Event
Jacqueline Brett	3
Heather Jensen	12
Morgan Muise	2
Lisa Eyamie	10
Tanilla Doyle	8
Norma Brown	5

Quarterfinals
Heather Jensen	9
Cheryl Bernard	5
Lisa Eyamie	10
Amy Nixon	2
Tanilla Doyle	7
Nikki Smith	8

Semifinals
Heather Jensen	7
Lisa Eyamie	5
Nikki Smith	7
Teryn Hamilton	8

Qualifier 2
Heather Jensen	3
Teryn Hamilton	12

C Event
Jacqueline Brett	5
Morgan Muise	10
Norma Brown	2
Cheryl Bernard	11

Quarterfinals
Tanilla Doyle	9
Lisa Eyamie	10
Morgan Muise	3
Nikki Smith	9
Cheryl Bernard	8
Amy Nixon	2

Semifinals
Lisa Eyamie	8
Nikki Smith	5
Cheryl Bernard	7
Heather Jensen	4

Qualifier 3
Lisa Eyamie	8
Cheryl Bernard	7

=== Peace Curling Association ===
The Peace Curling Association qualification event for the 2013 Alberta Scotties Tournament of Hearts took place from January 4 to 6 in Dawson Creek, British Columbia. The event qualified two teams to the provincial playdowns.

==== Teams ====
Skip	Third	Second	Lead	Locale
Kristie Moore	Blaine Richards	Michelle Trarback	Amber Cheveldave	Grande Prairie Curling Club, Grande Prairie
Delia DeJong	Stephanie Yanishewski	Janelle Sakamoto	Heather Stewart	Sexsmith Curling Club, Sexsmith

==== Results ====
Moore and DeJong played a two-game series to determine the ranking they would receive in the provincials, which affects the placement of teams in the provincials draw. Moore won the first game with a score of 8–6, but DeJong won the second game with a score of 12–2. The two teams then played a skills competition, which Moore won, giving her the A ranking and DeJong the B ranking.
