= 2011 The Shoot-Out =

- Host city: Edmonton, Alberta
- Arena: Saville Sports Centre
- Dates: September 15–18
- Men's winner: (Alberta) Randy Ferbey
- Curling club: Edmonton, Alberta
- Skip: Randy Ferbey
- Fourth: David Nedohin
- Second: Ted Appelman
- Lead: Brendan Melnyk
- Finalist: (Alberta) Rob Bucholz
- Women's winner: (Saskatchewan) Stefanie Lawton
- Curling club: Saskatoon, Saskatchewan
- Skip: Stefanie Lawton
- Third: Sherry Anderson
- Second: Sherri Singler
- Lead: Marliese Kasner
- Finalist: (Alberta) Cheryl Bernard

The 2011 Shoot-Out was a curling bonspiel that was held from September 15 to 18 at the Saville Sports Centre in Edmonton, Alberta as part of the 2011–12 World Curling Tour. The purse for the men's and women's events was CAD$26,000 and CAD$20,000, respectively.

== Men ==
=== Teams ===
Skip	Third	Second	Lead	Locale
Tom Appelman	Adam Enright	Brandon Klassen	Nathan Connolly	Edmonton, Alberta
Brent Bawel	Mike Jantzen	Sean O'Connor	Hardi Sulimma	Calgary, Alberta
Brendan Bottcher	Bradley Thiessen	Micky Lizmore	Karrick Martin	Edmonton, Alberta
Rob Bucholz	Evan Asmussen	Landon Bucholz	Bryce Bucholz	Edmonton, Alberta
Carl deConinck Smith	Jeff Sharp	Chris Haichert	Jesse St. John	Rosetown, Saskatchewan
David Nedohin (fourth)	Randy Ferbey (skip)	Ted Appelman	Brendan Melnyk	Edmonton, Alberta
Glen Kennedy	Dustin Eckstrand	Steve Meadows	Kris Meadows	Edmonton, Alberta
Warren Hassall (fourth)	Jamie King (skip)	Todd Brick	Sean Morris	Edmonton/Calgary, Alberta
Steve Laycock	Joel Jordison	Brennen Jones	Dallan Muyres	Saskatoon, Saskatchewan
Sven Michel	Claudio Pätz	Sandro Trolliet	Simon Gempeler	Adelboden, Switzerland
David Murdoch	Glen Muirhead	Ross Paterson	Richard Woods	Lockerbie, Scotland
Fukuhiro Ohno	Makoto Kawahira	Tomita Masashi	Inaba Tomonori	Karuizawa, Japan
Kevin Park	Shane Park	Aaron Sluchinski	Justin Sluchinski	Edmonton, Alberta
Dan Petryk (fourth)	Steve Petryk (skip)	Colin Hodgson	Brad Chyz	Calgary, Alberta
Kevin Yablonski (fourth)	Jon Rennie (skip)	Harrison Boss	Matthew McDonald	Calgary, Alberta
Dean Ross	Don DeLair	Chris Blackwell	Steve Jensen	Calgary, Alberta
Robert Schlender	Chris Lemishka	Darcy Hafso	Don Bartlett	Edmonton, Alberta
Brock Virtue	J. D. Lind	Dominic Daemen	Matthew Ng	Calgary, Alberta
Wade White	Kevin Tym	Dan Holowaychuk	George White	Edmonton, Alberta
Jeremy Hodges (fourth)	Matt Willerton (skip)	Dalen Petersen	Nevin DeMilliano	Edmonton, Alberta

=== Round-robin standings ===
Blue Pool	W	L
(Switzerland) Sven Michel	4	1
(Saskatchewan) Carl deConinck Smith	3	2
(Saskatchewan) Steve Laycock	3	2
(Alberta) Glen Kennedy	3	2
(Alberta) Matt Willerton	0	5

Orange Pool	W	L
(Alberta) Brendan Bottcher	5	0
(Scotland) David Murdoch	3	2
(Alberta) Jamie King	2	3
(Alberta) Jon Rennie	2	3
(Alberta) Brent Bawel	0	5

Gold Pool	W	L
(Alberta) Rob Bucholz	4	1
(Alberta) Randy Ferbey	4	1
(Alberta) Tom Appelman	3	2
(Alberta) Dean Ross	2	3
(Alberta) Steve Petryk	0	5

Black Pool	W	L
(Alberta) Brock Virtue	3	2
(Alberta) Robert Schlender	3	2
(Alberta) Wade White	3	2
(Alberta) Kevin Park	3	2
(Japan) Fukuhiro Ohno	0	5

=== Playoffs ===
Quarterfinals
(Alberta) Brendan Bottcher	3
(Saskatchewan) Carl deConinck Smith	6
(Alberta) Brock Virtue	3
(Alberta) Randy Ferbey	7
(Alberta) Rob Bucholz	9
(Scotland) David Murdoch	1
(Switzerland) Sven Michel	8
(Alberta) Robert Schlender	4

Semifinals
(Saskatchewan) Carl deConinck Smith	1
(Alberta) Randy Ferbey	6
(Alberta) Rob Bucholz	7
(Switzerland) Sven Michel	2

Final
(Alberta) Randy Ferbey	4
(Alberta) Rob Bucholz	3

== Women ==
=== Teams ===
Skip	Third	Second	Lead	Locale
Cheryl Bernard	Susan O'Connor	Lori Olson-Johns	Jennifer Sadleir	Calgary, Alberta
Chelsea Carey	Kristy McDonald	Kristen Foster	Lindsay Titheridge	Morden, Manitoba
Nadine Chyz	Rebecca Pattison	Whitney More	Kimberly Anderson	Calgary, Alberta
Michelle Corbeil	Dawn Corbeil	Krista Regnier	Alana Horn	Lloydminster, Alberta
Delia DeJong	Jessica Monk	Amy Janko	Aisha Veiner	Grande Prairie, Alberta
Glenys Bakker (fourth)	Heather Jensen	Brenda Doroshuk (skip)	Carly Quigley	Calgary, Alberta
Lisa Eyamie	Maria Bushell	Jodi Marthaller	Kyla MacLachlan	Calgary, Alberta
Dana Ferguson	Nikki Smith	Denise Kinghorn	Cori Morris	Calgary, Alberta
Lisa Johnson	Michelle Ries	Natalie Holloway	Shauna Nordstrom	Edmonton, Alberta
Jennifer Jones	Kaitlyn Lawes	Jennifer Clark-Rouire	Dawn Askin	Winnipeg, Manitoba
Jessie Kaufman	Nicky Kaufman	Amanda Coderre	Stephanie Enright	Edmonton, Alberta
Cathy King	Carolyn Morris	Doreen Gares	Lesley McEwan	Edmonton, Alberta
Stefanie Lawton	Sherry Anderson	Sherri Singler	Marliese Kasner	Saskatoon, Saskatchewan
Chana Martineau	Lesley Ewoniak	Brittany Zelmer	Marie Graham	Edmonton, Alberta
Heather Nedohin	Beth Iskiw	Jessica Mair	Laine Peters	Edmonton, Alberta
Tiffany Odegard	Andrea McCutcheon	Jennifer Van Wieren	Heather Kushnir	Edmonton, Alberta
Cathy Overton-Clapham	Jenna Loder	Ashley Howard	Breanne Meakin	Winnipeg, Manitoba
Vanessa Pouliot	Melissa Pierce	Megan Anderson	Jamie Forth	Edmonton, Alberta
Casey Scheidegger	Kalynn Park	Jessie Scheidegger	Joelle Horn	Lethbridge, Alberta
Renée Sonnenberg	Lawnie MacDonald	Kristie Moore	Rona Pasika	Grande Prairie, Alberta
Tiffany Steuber	Lisa Miller	Jenilee Goertzen	Cindy Westgard	Edmonton, Alberta
Valerie Sweeting	Leslie Rogers	Joanne Taylor	Rachelle Pidherny	Edmonton, Alberta
Crystal Webster	Erin Carmody	Geri-Lynn Ramsay	Samantha Preston	Calgary, Alberta
Holly Whyte	Heather Steele	Deanne Nichol	Carmen Barrack	Edmonton, Alberta

=== Round-robin standings ===
Blue Pool	W	L
(Alberta) Valerie Sweeting	4	1
(Alberta) Renée Sonnenberg	3	2
(Manitoba) Jennifer Jones	3	2
(Alberta) Tiffany Odegard	2	3
(Alberta) Holly Whyte	2	3
(Alberta) Nadine Chyz	1	4

Orange Pool	W	L
(Alberta) Cheryl Bernard	4	1
(Alberta) Crystal Webster	4	1
(Alberta) Brenda Doroshuk	3	2
(Alberta) Jessie Kaufman	3	2
(Alberta) Lisa Johnson	1	4
(Alberta) Michelle Corbeil	0	5

Gold Pool	W	L
(Alberta) Dana Ferguson	4	1
(Alberta) Tiffany Steuber	4	1
(Alberta) Lisa Eyamie	3	2
(Manitoba) Cathy Overton-Clapham	3	2
(Alberta) Heather Nedohin	1	4
(Alberta) Delia DeJong	0	5

Black Pool	W	L
(Saskatchewan) Stefanie Lawton	5	0
(Manitoba) Chelsea Carey	4	1
(Alberta) Casey Scheidegger	3	2
(Alberta) Cathy King	2	3
(Alberta) Valerie Pouliot	1	4
(Alberta) Chana Martineau	0	5

=== Playoffs ===
Quarterfinals
(Saskatchewan) Stefanie Lawton	7
(Alberta) Renée Sonnenberg	3
(Alberta) Valerie Sweeting	3
(Alberta) Crystal Webster	4
(Alberta) Cheryl Bernard	5
(Alberta) Tiffany Steuber	3
(Alberta) Dana Ferguson	4
(Manitoba) Chelsea Carey	7

Semifinals
(Saskatchewan) Stefanie Lawton	7
(Alberta) Crystal Webster	3
(Alberta) Cheryl Bernard	7
(Manitoba) Chelsea Carey	4

Final
(Saskatchewan) Stefanie Lawton	6
(Alberta) Cheryl Bernard	2
