= 2012 Alberta Scotties Tournament of Hearts =

- Host city: Leduc, Alberta
- Arena: Leduc Curling Club
- Dates: January 25–29, 2012
- Winner: Team Nedohin
- Curling club: Saville Community Sports Centre, Edmonton
- Skip: Heather Nedohin
- Third: Beth Iskiw
- Second: Jessica Mair
- Lead: Laine Peters
- Finalist: Jessie Kaufman

The 2012 Alberta Scotties Tournament of Hearts, Alberta's women's provincial curling championship, was held from January 25 to 29 at the Leduc Curling Club in Leduc, Alberta. The winning team of Heather Nedohin, represented Alberta at the 2012 Scotties Tournament of Hearts in Red Deer, Alberta, where they finished round robin with a 7-4 record, which was enough to finish 4th place and clinch a spot in the playoffs. The team would go on to win both the 3-4 game and the semi-final. They would face British Columbia in the final, where for the first time in fourteen years, Alberta would win the Scotties.

== Qualification Process ==
Twelve teams will qualify for the provincial tournament through several berths. The qualification process is as follows:

Teams	Qualification method	Berths	Qualifying team
Team 1	Defending champion from 2011 Alberta Scotties	1	Shannon Kleibrink
Team 2	CTRS points leader at the end of previous season	1	Heather Nedohin
Team 3	CTRS points leader from current season, as of December 5	1	Cheryl Bernard
Team 4	Alberta Women's Tour points leader after final event, November 28	1	Crystal Webster
Teams 5-7	Northern Alberta Curling Association Qualifier	3	Val Sweeting; Candace Wanechko; Jessie Kaufman
Teams 8-10	Southern Alberta Curling Association Qualifier	3	Casey Scheidegger; Lisa Eyamie; Glenys Bakker
Teams 11-12	Peace Curling Association Qualifier	2	Renée Sonnenberg; Desirée Owen

== Teams ==
Skip	Third	Second	Lead	Club(s)
Glenys Bakker	Heather Jensen	Brenda Doroshuk	Carly Quigley	Airdrie Curling Club, Airdrie
Cheryl Bernard	Susan O'Connor	Lori Olson-Johns	Jennifer Sadleir	Calgary Curling Club, Calgary
Lisa Eyamie	Maria Bushell	Jodi Marthaller	Kyla MacLachlan	High River Curling Club, High River
Jessie Kaufman	Nicky Kaufman	Amanda Coderre	Stephanie Enright	Saville Sports Centre, Edmonton
Shannon Kleibrink	Amy Nixon	Carolyn McRorie*	Chelsey Matson	Calgary Winter Club, Calgary
Heather Nedohin	Beth Iskiw	Jessica Mair	Laine Peters	Saville Sports Centre, Edmonton
Desirée Owen	Cary-Anne Sallows	Lindsey Makichuk	Stephanie Malekoff	Grand Prairie Curling Club, Grand Prairie
Casey Scheidegger	Kalynn Park	Jessie Scheidegger	Joelle Horn	Lethbridge Curling Club, Lethbridge
Renée Sonnenberg	Lawnie MacDonald	Kristie Moore	Rona Pasika	Grand Prairie Curling Club, Grand Prairie
Val Sweeting	Leslie Rogers	Joanne Taylor	Rachelle Pidherny	Saville Sports Centre, Edmonton
Candace Wanechko	Natalie Hughes	Kara Lindholm	Kandace Lindholm	Ellerslie Curling Club, Edmonton
Crystal Webster	Erin Carmody	Geri-Lynn Ramsay	Samantha Preston	Calgary Curling Club, Calgary

* McRorie replaced Bronwen Webster, who is pregnant and sitting out the rest of the season.

== Draw Brackets ==
=== A Event ===
Round of 16
Desirée Owen	4
Casey Scheidegger	5
Heather Nedohin	14
Candace Wanechko	2
A3	Val Sweeting	9
A3	Glenys Bakker	6
A4	Jessie Kaufman	8
A4	Lisa Eyamie	2

Quarterfinals
A5	Shannon Kleibrink	10
A1	Casey Scheidegger	3
A2	Heather Nedohin	8
A6	Renée Sonnenberg	4
A7	Crystal Webster	4
A3	Val Sweeting	8
A4	Jessie Kaufman	6
A8	Cheryl Bernard	3

Semifinals
A5	Shannon Kleibrink	3
A6	Heather Nedohin	7
A7	Val Sweeting	4
A8	Jessie Kaufman	7

A Qualifier
A9	Heather Nedohin	4
A10	Jessie Kaufman	6

=== B Event ===
Round of 16
Renée Sonnenberg	6
Desirée Owen	5
Crystal Webster	11
Candace Wanechko	3
A8	Cheryl Bernard	9
A3	Glenys Bakker	6
A5	Casey Scheidegger	12
A4	Lisa Eyamie	6

Quarterfinals
A10	Val Sweeting	13
B1	Renée Sonnenberg	7
A9	Shannon Kleibrink	8
B2	Crystal Webster	6
B3	Cheryl Bernard	8
B4	Casey Scheidegger	6

Semifinals
B5	Val Sweeting	4
B6	Shannon Kleibrink	9
B7	Cheryl Bernard	7
A11	Heather Nedohin	8

B Qualifier
B8	Shannon Kleibrink	5
B9	Heather Nedohin	6

=== C Event ===
Quarterfinals			Semifinals			C Qualifier 1
			C1	Desirée Owen	5
B1	Desirée Owen	9	B9	Cheryl Bernard	8
B2	Candace Wanechko	3				C4	Cheryl Bernard	4
						C5	Val Sweeting	10
			B7	Casey Scheidegger	5
			B8	Val Sweeting	6

Quarterfinals			Semifinals			C Qualifier 2
B5	Renée Sonnenberg	8
B3	Glenys Bakker	1	C2	Renée Sonnenberg	2
B4	Lisa Eyamie	4	C3	Crystal Webster	6
B6	Crystal Webster	8				C6	Crystal Webster	9
						B10	Shannon Kleibrink	7

== Results ==
=== Draw 1 ===
January 25, 9:30 AM MT

Sheet A	1	2	3	4	5	6	7	8	9	10	Final
Owen	0	0	0	0	1	0	0	2	1	0	4
Scheidegger	0	1	1	0	0	2	0	0	0	1	5

Sheet B	1	2	3	4	5	6	7	8	9	10	Final
Nedohin	2	1	0	2	0	4	5	X	X	X	14
Wanechko	0	0	1	0	1	0	0	X	X	X	2

Sheet C	1	2	3	4	5	6	7	8	9	10	11	Final
Sweeting	1	0	2	0	2	0	0	1	0	0	3	9
Bakker	0	1	0	1	0	1	0	0	2	1	0	6

Sheet D	1	2	3	4	5	6	7	8	9	10	Final
Kaufman	0	2	0	0	0	2	0	4	X	X	8
Eyamie	0	0	1	0	0	0	1	0	X	X	2

=== Draw 2 ===
January 25, 6:30 PM MT

Sheet A	1	2	3	4	5	6	7	8	9	10	Final
Kleibrink	2	2	0	1	0	0	5	X	X	X	10
Scheidegger	0	0	1	0	1	1	0	X	X	X	3

Sheet B	1	2	3	4	5	6	7	8	9	10	Final
Sonnenberg	0	1	0	1	0	1	0	0	1	X	4
Nedohin	2	0	2	0	2	0	1	1	0	X	8

Sheet C	1	2	3	4	5	6	7	8	9	10	Final
Webster	0	0	0	2	0	0	2	0	0	X	4
Sweeting	0	0	1	0	4	0	0	2	1	X	8

Sheet D	1	2	3	4	5	6	7	8	9	10	Final
Bernard	0	1	0	0	1	0	1	0	0	X	3
Kaufman	0	0	0	1	0	0	0	2	3	X	6

=== Draw 3 ===
January 26, 9:00 AM MT

Sheet A	1	2	3	4	5	6	7	8	9	10	Final
Kleibrink	0	0	0	0	2	0	0	1	0	X	3
Nedohin	0	2	0	1	0	2	0	0	2	X	7

Sheet B	1	2	3	4	5	6	7	8	9	10	Final
Sweeting	0	1	0	0	1	0	0	1	1	0	4
Kaufman	1	0	0	2	0	1	0	0	0	3	7

=== Draw 4 ===
January 26, 2:00 PM MT

Sheet A	1	2	3	4	5	6	7	8	9	10	Final
Owen	1	0	1	0	0	1	1	0	1	0	5
Sonnenberg	0	3	0	1	0	0	0	1	0	1	6

Sheet B	1	2	3	4	5	6	7	8	9	10	Final
Wanechko	0	0	0	0	2	0	1	0	X	X	3
Webster	2	1	0	3	0	2	0	3	X	X	11

Sheet C	1	2	3	4	5	6	7	8	9	10	Final
Bakker	0	0	2	0	1	0	0	3	0	X	6
Bernard	2	0	0	1	0	2	2	0	2	X	9

Sheet D	1	2	3	4	5	6	7	8	9	10	Final
Eyamie	2	0	0	0	3	0	0	1	0	X	6
Scheidegger	0	1	5	1	0	3	1	0	1	X	12

=== Draw 5 ===
January 26, 6:30 PM MT

Sheet A	1	2	3	4	5	6	7	8	9	10	Final
Sweeting	1	0	0	2	1	3	0	3	3	X	13
Sonnenberg	0	2	3	0	0	0	2	0	0	X	7

Sheet B	1	2	3	4	5	6	7	8	9	10	Final
Kleibrink	0	3	0	2	0	1	0	1	0	1	8
Webster	0	0	1	0	1	0	3	0	1	0	6

Sheet C	1	2	3	4	5	6	7	8	9	10	Final
Bernard	0	1	1	0	2	0	1	0	2	1	8
Scheidegger	0	0	0	2	0	3	0	1	0	0	6

=== A Final ===
January 26, 6:30 PM MT

Sheet D	1	2	3	4	5	6	7	8	9	10	Final
Kaufman	0	2	1	0	2	0	0	0	1	X	6
Nedohin	2	0	0	1	0	0	0	1	0	X	4

=== Draw 6 ===
January 27, 9:00 AM MT

Sheet A	1	2	3	4	5	6	7	8	9	10	Final
Owen	3	1	0	2	0	0	3	X	X	X	9
Wanechko	0	0	1	0	1	1	0	X	X	X	3

Sheet B	1	2	3	4	5	6	7	8	9	10	Final
Bakker	0	0	0	0	1	0	0	X	X	X	1
Sonnenberg	0	1	1	0	0	5	1	X	X	X	8

Sheet C	1	2	3	4	5	6	7	8	9	10	Final
Eyamie	1	0	0	1	0	0	1	0	1	X	4
Webster	0	1	2	0	2	2	0	1	0	X	8

=== Draw 7 ===
January 27, 2:00 PM MT

Sheet A	1	2	3	4	5	6	7	8	9	10	Final
Sweeting	0	0	1	2	0	0	1	0	0	X	4
Kleibrink	0	4	0	0	1	2	0	1	1	X	9

Sheet B	1	2	3	4	5	6	7	8	9	10	11	Final
Bernard	0	1	0	1	1	0	1	2	0	1	0	7
Nedohin	2	0	3	0	0	1	0	0	1	0	1	8

=== Draw 8 ===
January 27, 6:30 PM MT

Sheet A	1	2	3	4	5	6	7	8	9	10	Final
Scheidegger	0	1	0	1	0	2	0	1	1	X	5
Sweeting	1	0	3	0	1	0	1	0	0	X	6

Sheet B	1	2	3	4	5	6	7	8	9	10	Final
Owen	0	0	0	0	3	0	1	0	1	X	5
Bernard	0	1	0	4	0	1	0	2	0	X	8

Sheet C	1	2	3	4	5	6	7	8	9	10	Final
Sonnenberg	0	0	0	0	2	0	0	0	0	X	2
Webster	0	1	1	1	0	1	0	1	1	X	6

=== B Final ===
January 27, 6:30 PM MT

Sheet D	1	2	3	4	5	6	7	8	9	10	Final
Kleibrink	0	0	0	0	0	0	2	0	3	0	5
Nedohin	0	0	0	1	1	2	0	1	0	1	6

=== C Final 1 ===
January 28, 1:00 PM MT

Sheet A	1	2	3	4	5	6	7	8	9	10	Final
Bernard	0	2	0	1	0	1	0	X	X	X	4
Sweeting	2	0	2	0	4	0	2	X	X	X	10

=== C Final 2 ===
January 28, 1:00 PM MT

Sheet B	1	2	3	4	5	6	7	8	9	10	Final
Webster	2	0	1	1	0	3	0	1	0	1	9
Kleibrink	0	3	0	0	1	0	2	0	1	0	7

== Playoffs ==
Page playoff system
A1	Jessie Kaufman	6
B1	Heather Nedohin	3
C1	Val Sweeting	4
C2	Crystal Webster	5

Semifinal
B1	Heather Nedohin	6
C2	Crystal Webster	5

Final
A1	Jessie Kaufman	5
B1	Heather Nedohin	8

=== A1 vs. B1 ===
January 28, 6:30 PM MT

Sheet B	1	2	3	4	5	6	7	8	9	10	Final
Kaufman	0	0	3	0	0	0	0	2	1	X	6
Nedohin	0	0	0	2	0	1	0	0	0	X	3

=== C1 vs. C2 ===
January 28, 6:30 PM MT

Sheet C	1	2	3	4	5	6	7	8	9	10	Final
Sweeting	1	0	1	0	1	0	0	1	0	0	4
Webster	0	1	0	2	0	1	0	0	0	1	5

=== Semifinal ===
January 29, 9:30 AM MT

Sheet B	1	2	3	4	5	6	7	8	9	10	11	Final
Nedohin	1	0	0	0	1	0	1	0	1	1	1	6
Webster	0	2	0	0	0	2	0	1	0	0	0	5

=== Final ===
January 29, 2:00 PM MT

Sheet B	1	2	3	4	5	6	7	8	9	10	Final
Kaufman	0	1	0	1	0	2	0	1	0	X	5
Nedohin	1	0	3	0	2	0	1	0	1	X	8

2012 Alberta Scotties Tournament of Hearts

Heather Nedohin
4th Alberta Provincial Championship title

== Qualifying Events ==
=== Northern Qualification ===
The Northern Qualification for the 2012 Alberta Scotties Tournament of Hearts took place from January 6 to 8 at the Thistle Curling Club in Edmonton. The event qualified three teams to the provincial playdowns.

==== Teams ====
Skip	Third	Second	Lead	Club(s)
Pamela Appelman*	Diane McNallie	Jaclyn Iskiw	Glenna Rubin	Saville Sports Centre, Edmonton
Trina Ball	Jillian Martin	Amie Dowell	Kaitlin Cleveley	Saville Sports Centre, Edmonton
Dawn Corbeil	Michelle Corbeil	Krista Regnier	Alana Horn	Lloydminster Curling Club, Lloydminster
Delia DeJong	Jessica Monk	Amy Janko	Michelle Dykstra	Saville Sports Centre, Edmonton
Brenda Doroshuk	Marianna Greenbough	Paula Knight	Tracey Mattock-Wallbank	Saville Sports Centre, Edmonton
Kelly Erickson	Erica Ortt	Hilary McDermott	Erin Brennan	Saville Sports Centre, Edmonton
Lisa Johnson	Michelle Ries	Natalie Holloway	Shawna Nordstrom	Spruce Grove Curling Club, Spruce Grove
Jessie Kaufman	Nicky Kaufman	Amanda Coderre	Stephanie Enright	Saville Sports Centre, Edmonton
Chana Martineau	Lesley Ewoniak	Brittany Zelmer	Marie Graham	Saville Sports Centre, Edmonton
Tiffany Odegard	Andrea McCutcheon	Jennifer VanWieren	Heather Kushnir	Granite Curling Club, Edmonton
Susan Ouellette-Milliken	Brenda Brouwer	Christa Perepelitza	Michelle Mills	Cold Lake Curling Club, Cold Lake
Vanessa Pouliot	Melissa Pierce	Megan Anderson	Jamie Forth	Crestwood Curling Club, Crestwood
Tiffany Steuber	Lisa Miller	Jenilee Goertzen	Cindy Westgard	Thistle Curling Club, Edmonton
Val Sweeting	Leslie Rogers	Joanne Taylor	Rachelle Pidherny	Saville Sports Centre, Edmonton
Candace Wanechko	Natalie Hughes	Kara Lindholm	Kandace Lindholm	Ellerslie Curling Club, Edmonton
Alicia Wenger	Ashlee Foster	Jennifer Stiglitz	Giselle Gervais	Lloydminster Curling Club, Lloydminster
Holly Whyte	Heather Steele	Deanne Nichol	Deena Benoit	Saville Sports Centre, Edmonton
Nola Zingel	Heather Kuntz	Jill Watson	Melissa Martens	Lloydminster Curling Club, Lloydminster

* Appleman withdrew from the competition but was included in the event. Each team scheduled against Appleman received a bye to the next draw.

=== Results ===
==== A Event ====
Round of 32
Pamela Appleman	X
Dawn Corbeil	WO
Trina Ball	5
Holly Whyte	9

Round of 16
Brenda Doroshuk	11
Chana Martineau	6
Val Sweeting	6
Dawn Corbeil	3
Tiffany Odegard	13
Susan Ouellette-Milliken	4
Tiffany Steuber	10
Alicia Wenger	5
Lisa Johnson	11
Kelly Erickson	6
Jessie Kaufman	9
Holly Whyte	5
Candace Wanechko	10
Delia DeJong	9
Vanessa Pouliot	3
Nola Zingel	8

Quarterfinals
Brenda Doroshuk	5
Val Sweeting	9
Tiffany Odegard	7
Tiffany Steuber	9
Lisa Johnson	8
Jessie Kaufman	3
Candace Wanechko	11
Nola Zingel	8

Semifinals
Val Sweeting	8
Tiffany Steuber	7
Lisa Johnson	7
Candace Wanechko	5

A Qualifier
Val Sweeting	7
Lisa Johnson	2

==== B Event ====
Second Knockout
Delia DeJong	9
Kelly Erikson	3
Chana Martineau	11
Susan Ouellette-Milliken	4

Quarterfinals
Delia DeJong	7
Chana Martineau	5
Trina Ball	WO
Pamela Appleman	X

Semifinals
Jessie Kaufman	2
Delia DeJong	9
Tiffany Odegard	13
Trina Ball	7

To B Semifinal
Delia DeJong	6
Tiffany Odegard	7

Second Knockout
Holly Whyte	7
Dawn Corbeil	6
Alicia Wenger	3
Vanessa Pouliot	11

Quarterfinals
Brenda Doroshuk	6
Holly Whyte	11
Nola Zingel	7
Vanessa Pouliot	6

Semifinals
Tiffany Steuber	10
Holly Whyte	3
Candace Wanechko	6
Vanessa Pouliot	5

To B Qualifier
Tiffany Steuber	4
Candace Wanechko	9

B Semifinal			B Qualifier
			1	Candace Wanechko	9
2	Lisa Johnson	3		Tiffany Odegard	3
3	Tiffany Odegard	12

==== C Event ====
Second Knockout
Alicia Wenger	WO
Pamela Appleman	X
Susan Ouellette-Milliken	5
Kelly Erikson	15
Nola Zingel	6
Trina Ball	10

Quarterfinals
Alicia Wenger	4
Kelly Erikson	9
Delia DeJong	10
Trina Ball	1

Semifinals
Lisa Johnson	1
Kelly Erikson	9
Delia DeJong	10
Tiffany Steuber	7

To C Qualifier
Kelly Erikson	6
Delia DeJong	3

Second Knockout
Dawn Corbeil	11
Chana Martineau	6

Quarterfinals
Dawn Corbeil	5
Holly Whyte	7
Vanessa Pouliot	5
Jessie Kaufman	8

Semifinals
Holly Whyte	3
Jessie Kaufman	10

To C Qualifier
Tiffany Odegard	4
Jessie Kaufman	6
C Qualifier
Kelly Erikson	2
Jessie Kaufman	5

=== Southern Qualification ===
The Southern Qualification for the 2012 Alberta Scotties Tournament of Hearts took place from January 6 to 9 at the Airdrie Curling Club in Airdrie. The event qualified three teams to the provincial playdowns.

==== Teams ====
Skip	Third	Second	Lead	Club(s)
Glenys Bakker	Heather Jensen	Brenda Doroshuk	Carly Quigley	Airdrie Curling Club, Airdrie
Nicole Blenkin	Sandi Weber	Kristina Hadden	Mandy Seinen	Calgary Curling Club, Calgary
Jacqueline Brett				Calgary Curling Club, Calgary
Norma Brown				Strathmore Curling Club, Strathmore
Nadine Chyz	Rebecca Pattison	Whitney More	Kimberly Anderson	Glencoe Curling Club, Calgary
Tanilla Doyle	Lindsay Amudsen-Meyer	Janice Bailey	Christina Faulkner	Highwood Curling Club, Calgary
Lisa Eyamie	Maria Bushell	Jodi Marthaller	Kyla MacLachlan	High River Curling Club, High River
Dana Ferguson	Nikki Smith	Denise Kinghorn	Cori Morris	Calgary Curling Club, Calgary
Morgan Muise	Lyndsay Allen	Sarah Horne	Michelle Collin	Calgary Curling Club, Calgary
Sheri Pickering	Cheyanne Creasser	Karen Schiml	Donna Phillips	Calgary Curling Club, Calgary
Casey Scheidegger	Kalynn Park	Jessie Scheidegger	Joelle Horn	Lethbridge Curling Club, Lethbridge
Michele Smith (fourth)	Heather Armstrong	Shana Snell (skip)	Alanna Blackwell	Calgary Curling Club, Calgary

==== A Event ====
First Knockout
Tanilla Doyle	6
Shana Snell	4
Morgan Muise	6
Glenys Bakker	4
Nadine Chyz	6
Dana Ferguson	3
Casey Scheidegger	11
Norma Brown	2

Quarterfinals
Tanilla Doyle	13
Nicole Blenkin	6
Morgan Muise	5
Sheri Pickering	7
Jacqueline Brett	1
Nadine Chyz	10
Lisa Eyamie	5
Casey Scheidegger	7

Semifinals
Tanilla Doyle	3
Sheri Pickering	6
Nadine Chyz	4
Casey Scheidegger	7

A Qualifier
Sheri Pickering	3
Casey Scheidegger	8

==== B Event ====
Second Knockout
Shana Snell	8
Morgan Muise	6
Dana Ferguson	6
Lisa Eyamie	7

Semifinals
Shana Snell	9
Nadine Chyz	7
Lisa Eyamie	11
Tanilla Doyle	9

To B Qualifier
Shana Snell	1
Lisa Eyamie	8

Second Knockout
Glenys Bakker	7
Nicole Blenkin	3
Norma Brown	7
Jacqueline Brett	6

Semifinals
Glenys Bakker	9
Norma Brown	1

To B Qualifier
Glenys Bakker	10
Sheri Pickering	9
B Qualifier
Lisa Eyamie	6
Glenys Bakker	4

==== C Event ====
Third Knockout
Dana Ferguson	7
Norma Brown	9
Morgan Muise	8
Tanilla Doyle	9

Semifinals
Norma Brown	5
Shana Snell	8
Sheri Pickering	7
Tanilla Doyle	10

To C Qualifier
Shana Snell	4
Tanilla Doyle	6

Third Knockout
Nicole Blenkin	10
Jacqueline Brett	3

Semifinals
Nadine Chyz	7
Nicole Blenkin	4

To C Qualifier
Nadine Chyz	6
Glenys Bakker	7
C Qualifier
Tanilla Doyle	4
Glenys Bakker	5
