= 2017 Alberta Scotties Tournament of Hearts =

2017 Jiffy Lube Alberta Scotties Tournament of Hearts
- Host city: St. Albert, Alberta
- Arena: St. Albert Curling Club
- Dates: January 25–29
- Winner: Team Kleibrink
- Curling club: Okotoks Curling Club, Okotoks
- Skip: Shannon Kleibrink
- Third: Lisa Eyamie
- Second: Sarah Wilkes
- Lead: Alison Thiessen
- Alternate: Heather Nedohin
- Finalist: Val Sweeting

The 2017 Jiffy Lube Alberta Scotties Tournament of Hearts, Alberta's provincial women's curling championship, was held from January 25 to 29 at the St. Albert Curling Club in St. Albert, Alberta. The winning Shannon Kleibrink team represented Alberta at the 2017 Scotties Tournament of Hearts in St. Catharines.

The 2006 Winter Olympics bronze medallist Shannon Kleibrink and her Okotoks, Alberta-based team never trailed in the final game against Val Sweeting. It was Kleibrink's fifth career provincial championship, but the first for her teammates. Kleibrink had missed a few games due to a back injury following a routine work-out session and was replaced by two-time Scotties champion Heather Nedohin. For Sweeting, her loss in the final was the second time in a row, as she had lost to Chelsea Carey in the final of the 2016 Alberta Scotties Tournament of Hearts.

Organizers of the event were pleased with the turnout of the event. It was the first provincial Scotties to be held in St. Albert since 1984.

== Qualification Process ==
This is how the 12 teams qualified:

| Qualification method | Berths | Qualifying team |
|---|---|---|
| CTRS leaders | 2 | Val Sweeting; Casey Scheidegger |
| Alberta Tour | 2 | Nadine Chyz; Shannon Kleibrink |
| Peace Region | 2 | Delia DeJong; Trisha James |
| Northern Alberta | 3 | Holly Baird; Karynn Flory; Holly Scott |
| Southern Alberta | 3 | Geri-Lynn Ramsay; Kalynn Virtue; Jodi Marthaller |

== Teams ==
The teams are listed as follows:

| Skip | Third | Second | Lead | Alternate | Club(s) |
|---|---|---|---|---|---|
| Holly Baird | Pam Appelman | Leslie Rogers | Chana Martineau | | Saville Sports Centre, Edmonton |
| Nadine Chyz | Heather Jensen | Rebecca Konschuh | Heather Rogers | | The Glencoe Club, Calgary |
| Delia DeJong | Teryn Hamilton | Amy Janko | Megan Watchorn | | Sexsmith Curling Club, Sexsmith |
| Karynn Flory | Richelle Nanninga | Sydney Lewko | Sarah Brown | | Avonair Curling Club, Edmonton |
| Trisha James | Michelle Gnam | Raeleigh Milner | Chelsey Whitney | | Fairview Curling Club, Fairview |
| Shannon Kleibrink | Lisa Eyamie | Sarah Wilkes | Alison Thiessen | Heather Nedohin | Okotoks Curling Club, Okotoks |
| Jodi Marthaller | Tessa Ruetz | Nicole Larson | Valerie Ekelund | | Lethbridge Curling Club, Lethbridge |
| Geri-Lynn Ramsay | Jody McNabb | Brittany Tran | Claire Tully | | North Hill Curling Club, Calgary |
| Val Sweeting | Lori Olson-Johns | Dana Ferguson | Rachelle Brown | | Saville Sports Centre, Edmonton |
| Casey Scheidegger | Cary-Anne McTaggart | Jessie Scheidegger | Stephanie Enright | Nikki Smith | Lethbridge Curling Club, Lethbridge |
| Holly Scott | Megan Anderson | Tara Lamoureux | Trina Ball | Melissa Pierce | Saville Sports Centre, Edmonton |
| Kalynn Virtue | Shana Snell | Amanda Craigie | Kaitlin Stubbs | | Lethbridge Curling Club, Lethbridge |

== Knockout brackets ==
=== A Event ===
First Knockout
Holly Baird | 13
Karynn Flory | 1
Geri-Lynn Ramsay | 7
Trisha James | 6
Kalynn Virtue | 6
Delia DeJong | 5
Jodi Marthaller | 7
Holly Scott | 6

Quarterfinals
Val Sweeting | 7
Holly Baird | 3
Nadine Chyz | 7
Geri-Lynn Ramsay | 9
Shannon Kleibrink | 5
Kalynn Virtue | 4
Casey Scheidegger | 3
Jodi Marthaller | 6

Semifinals
Val Sweeting | 6
Geri-Lynn Ramsay | 7
Shannon Kleibrink | 5
Jodi Marthaller | 3

A Qualifier
Geri-Lynn Ramsay | 6
Shannon Kleibrink | 7

=== B Event ===
Second Knockout
Nadine Chyz | 10
Karynn Flory | 3
Kalynn Virtue | 5
Holly Scott | 4
Casey Scheidegger | 8
Delia DeJong | 7
Holly Baird | 7
Trisha James | 3

Quarterfinals
Nadine Chyz | 7
Jodi Marthaller | 3
Kalynn Virtue | 4
Val Sweeting | 7
Casey Scheidegger | 5
Holly Baird | 4

Semifinals
Nadine Chyz | 6
Val Sweeting | 8
Casey Scheidegger | 6
Geri-Lynn Ramsay | 4

B Qualifier
Val Sweeting | 7
Casey Scheidegger | 6

=== C Event ===
Third Knockout
Karynn Flory | 6
Holly Scott | 8

Semifinals
Holly Scott | 5
Geri-Lynn Ramsay | 6
Holly Baird | 8
Nadine Chyz | 6

C Qualifier 2
Geri-Lynn Ramsay | 9
Holly Baird | 8

| Third Knockout | | Semifinals | | C Qualifier 2 |
| Delia DeJong | 9 |
| Jodi Marthaller | 4 | Delia DeJong | 2 |
| Trisha James | 5 | Kalynn Virtue | 6 |
| Kalynn Virtue | 7 | | | Kalynn Virtue | 6 |
| | | | | Casey Scheidegger | 8 |

== Playoffs ==
Page playoff system
A | Shannon Kleibrink | 7
B | Val Sweeting | 6
C1 | Geri-Lynn Ramsay | 5
C2 | Casey Scheidegger | 8

Semifinal
B | Val Sweeting | 5
C2 | Casey Scheidegger | 3

Final
A | Shannon Kleibrink | 6
B | Val Sweeting | 4

=== A vs B ===
Saturday, January 28, 6:30pm

| Team | 1 | 2 | 3 | 4 | 5 | 6 | 7 | 8 | 9 | 10 | 11 | Final |
|---|---|---|---|---|---|---|---|---|---|---|---|---|
| Val Sweeting | 0 | 1 | 1 | 0 | 1 | 0 | 2 | 0 | 1 | 0 | 0 | 6 |
| Shannon Kleibrink | 0 | 0 | 0 | 2 | 0 | 1 | 0 | 1 | 0 | 2 | 1 | 7 |

=== C1 vs C2 ===
Saturday, January 28, 6:30pm

| Team | 1 | 2 | 3 | 4 | 5 | 6 | 7 | 8 | 9 | 10 | Final |
|---|---|---|---|---|---|---|---|---|---|---|---|
| Geri-Lynn Ramsay | 0 | 0 | 2 | 0 | 1 | 0 | 1 | 0 | 1 | X | 5 |
| Casey Scheidegger | 0 | 1 | 0 | 4 | 0 | 2 | 0 | 1 | 0 | X | 8 |

=== Semifinal ===
Sunday, January 29, 11:00am

| Team | 1 | 2 | 3 | 4 | 5 | 6 | 7 | 8 | 9 | 10 | Final |
|---|---|---|---|---|---|---|---|---|---|---|---|
| Val Sweeting | 0 | 1 | 0 | 0 | 0 | 2 | 0 | 0 | 0 | 2 | 5 |
| Casey Scheidegger | 0 | 0 | 0 | 1 | 0 | 0 | 0 | 1 | 1 | 0 | 3 |

=== Final ===
Sunday, January 29, 5:00 pm

| Team | 1 | 2 | 3 | 4 | 5 | 6 | 7 | 8 | 9 | 10 | Final |
|---|---|---|---|---|---|---|---|---|---|---|---|
| Val Sweeting | 0 | 0 | 0 | 2 | 0 | 0 | 0 | 1 | 1 | X | 4 |
| Shannon Kleibrink | 2 | 0 | 0 | 0 | 1 | 1 | 2 | 0 | 0 | X | 6 |

2017 Alberta Scotties Tournament of Hearts

Shannon Kleibrink
5th Alberta Provincial Championship title
