= 2015 Alberta Scotties Tournament of Hearts =

2015 Jiffy Lube Alberta Scotties Tournament of Hearts
- Host city: Lacombe, Alberta
- Arena: Lacombe Arena
- Dates: January 21–25
- Winner: Team Sweeting
- Curling club: Saville Sports Centre, Edmonton
- Skip: Val Sweeting
- Third: Lori Olson-Johns
- Second: Dana Ferguson
- Lead: Rachelle Brown
- Finalist: Chelsea Carey

The 2015 Jiffy Lube Alberta Scotties Tournament of Hearts, Alberta's provincial women's curling championship, was held from January 21 to 25 at the Lacombe Arena in Lacombe, Alberta. The winning team Val Sweeting team represented Alberta at the 2015 Scotties Tournament of Hearts in Moose Jaw.

== Qualification ==
Twelve teams qualified for the provincial tournament through several methods. The qualification process is as follows:

Qualification method	Berths	Qualifying team
Defending champion from previous year	1	Val Sweeting
Highest-ranked team on CTRS not already qualified	1	Heather Nedohin
Alberta Curling Federation bonspiel points	2	Chelsea Carey; Casey Scheidegger
Peace Curling Association qualifier (Dec. 20–21)	2	Deanne Nichol; Delia DeJong
Northern Alberta Curling Association qualifier (Dec. 19–21)	3	Nicky Kaufman; Karynn Flory; Tiffany Game
Southern Alberta Curling Association qualifier (Jan. 2–4)	3	Shannon Kleibrink; Crystal Webster; Teryn Hamilton

== Teams ==
The teams are listed as follows:

Skip	Third	Second	Lead	Club(s)
Chelsea Carey	Laura Crocker	Taylor McDonald	Jen Gates	Saville Sports Centre, Edmonton
Delia DeJong	Amy Janko	Brittany Zelmer	Janais DeJong	Grande Prairie Curling Club, Grande Prairie
Karynn Flory	Richelle Baer	Amanda Moizis	Katie Roskewich	Saville Sports Centre, Edmonton
Tiffany Game	Vanessa Pouliot	Jennifer Van Wieren	Melissa Pierce	Crestwood Curling Club, Edmonton
Teryn Hamilton	Kalynn Park	Sandi Weber	Alanna Blackwell	Glencoe Curling Club, Calgary
Nicky Kaufman	Holly Whyte	Deena Benoit	Pam Appelman	Saville Sports Centre, Edmonton
Shannon Kleibrink	Lisa Eyamie	Nikki Smith	Darah Blandford	Calgary Curling Club, Calgary
Heather Nedohin	Amy Nixon	Jessica Mair	Laine Peters	Saville Sports Centre, Edmonton
Deanne Nichol	Dawn Corbeil	Sandra Sharp	Michelle Pashniak	Peace River Curling Club, Peace River
Casey Scheidegger	Cary-Anne McTaggart	Jessie Scheidegger	Brittany Tran	Lethbridge Curling Club, Lethbridge
Val Sweeting	Lori Olson-Johns	Dana Ferguson	Rachelle Brown	Saville Sports Centre, Edmonton
Crystal Webster	Jessie Kaufman	Geri-Lynn Ramsay	Rebecca Konschuh	Glencoe Curling Club, Calgary

== Knockout Draw Brackets ==
The draw is listed as follows:

=== A event ===
First Knockout
Tiffany Game	9
Teryn Hamilton	5
Casey Scheidegger	8
Deanne Nichol	2
Crystal Webster	10
Karynn Flory	3
Nicky Kaufman	6
Delia DeJong	4

Quarterfinals
Val Sweeting	6
Tiffany Game	5
Casey Scheidegger	8
Shannon Kleibrink	7
Chelsea Carey	6
Crystal Webster	5
Nicky Kaufman	4
Heather Nedohin	9

Semifinals
Val Sweeting	7
Casey Scheidegger	5
Chelsea Carey	6
Heather Nedohin	3

A Qualifier
Val Sweeting	9
Chelsea Carey	8

=== B event ===
Second Knockout
Shannon Kleibrink	7
Teryn Hamilton	5
Crystal Webster	7
Deanne Nichol	6
Nicky Kaufman	10
Karynn Flory	3
Tiffany Game	6
Delia DeJong	11

Quarterfinals
Shannon Kleibrink	5
Heather Nedohin	8
Crystal Webster	7
Casey Scheidegger	11
Nicky Kaufman	9
Delia DeJong	7

Semifinals
Heather Nedohin	8
Casey Scheidegger	7
Nicky Kaufman	4
Chelsea Carey	6

B Qualifier
Heather Nedohin	6
Chelsea Carey	3

=== C event ===
Third Knockout
Teryn Hamilton	7
Deanne Nichol	1

Semifinals
Teryn Hamilton	6
Nicky Kaufman	5
Delia DeJong	6
Casey Scheidegger	8

C Qualifier 2
Teryn Hamilton	4
Casey Scheidegger	8

Third Knockout		Semifinals		C Qualifier 2
Shannon Kleibrink	8
Karynn Flory	6	Shannon Kleibrink	3
Crystal Webster	9	Crystal Webster	8
Tiffany Game	7			Crystal Webster	3
				Chelsea Carey	6

== Knockout results ==
All draw times listed in Mountain Standard Time (UTC−7).

=== Draw 1 ===
Wednesday, January 21, 9:30 am

Team	1	2	3	4	5	6	7	8	9	10	Final
Tiffany Game	2	1	0	1	3	0	1	0	1	X	9
Teryn Hamilton	0	0	2	0	0	2	0	1	0	X	5

Team	1	2	3	4	5	6	7	8	9	10	Final
Casey Scheidegger	3	0	0	3	1	0	1	0	X	X	8
Deanne Nichol	0	0	1	0	0	1	0	0	X	X	2

Team	1	2	3	4	5	6	7	8	9	10	Final
Crystal Webster	0	2	5	0	0	2	1	X	X	X	10
Karynn Flory	1	0	0	1	1	0	0	X	X	X	3

Team	1	2	3	4	5	6	7	8	9	10	Final
Nicky Kaufman	1	0	2	0	1	0	1	0	1	X	6
Delia DeJong	0	1	0	2	0	0	0	1	0	X	4

=== Draw 2 ===
Wednesday, January 21, 6:30 pm

Team	1	2	3	4	5	6	7	8	9	10	Final
Val Sweeting	0	2	0	2	1	0	1	0	0	X	6
Tiffany Game	1	0	1	0	0	1	0	1	1	X	5

Team	1	2	3	4	5	6	7	8	9	10	11	Final
Casey Scheidegger	0	0	0	1	0	2	2	1	1	0	1	8
Shannon Kleibrink	0	2	1	0	3	0	0	0	0	1	0	7

Team	1	2	3	4	5	6	7	8	9	10	11	Final
Chelsea Carey	0	0	0	1	1	1	0	1	1	0	1	6
Crystal Webster	0	1	0	0	0	0	3	0	0	1	0	5

Team	1	2	3	4	5	6	7	8	9	10	Final
Nicky Kaufman	0	1	0	1	0	0	2	0	X	X	4
Heather Nedohin	3	0	2	0	1	2	0	1	X	X	9

=== Draw 3 ===
Thursday, January 22, 9:00 am

Team	1	2	3	4	5	6	7	8	9	10	Final
Val Sweeting	0	1	0	1	1	0	2	0	0	2	7
Casey Scheidegger	0	0	1	0	0	2	0	2	0	0	5

Team	1	2	3	4	5	6	7	8	9	10	11	Final
Chelsea Carey	1	0	0	0	0	1	0	1	0	0	3	6
Heather Nedohin	0	0	0	0	1	0	1	0	0	1	0	3

=== Draw 4 ===
Thursday, January 22, 2:00 pm

Team	1	2	3	4	5	6	7	8	9	10	Final
Shannon Kleibrink	2	1	0	2	0	1	0	0	0	1	7
Teryn Hamilton	0	0	0	0	1	0	2	1	1	0	5

Team	1	2	3	4	5	6	7	8	9	10	Final
Crystal Webster	1	1	0	0	1	0	0	1	0	3	7
Deanne Nichol	0	0	1	1	0	2	1	0	1	0	6

Team	1	2	3	4	5	6	7	8	9	10	Final
Nicky Kaufman	2	0	0	2	3	1	2	X	X	X	10
Karynn Flory	0	1	1	0	0	0	0	X	X	X	3

Team	1	2	3	4	5	6	7	8	9	10	Final
Tiffany Game	0	3	0	0	0	3	0	X	X	X	6
Delia DeJong	0	0	2	3	4	0	2	X	X	X	11

=== Draw 5 ===
Thursday, January 22, 6:30 pm

Team	1	2	3	4	5	6	7	8	9	10	Final
Val Sweeting	0	3	0	0	3	0	2	0	0	1	9
Chelsea Carey	1	0	2	0	0	2	0	2	1	0	8

Team	1	2	3	4	5	6	7	8	9	10	Final
Shannon Kleibrink	0	0	2	1	0	1	1	0	0	X	5
Heather Nedohin	2	4	0	0	1	0	0	1	0	X	8

Team	1	2	3	4	5	6	7	8	9	10	Final
Crystal Webster	2	0	0	2	0	1	0	2	0	X	7
Casey Scheidegger	0	1	3	0	2	0	3	0	2	X	11

Team	1	2	3	4	5	6	7	8	9	10	Final
Nicky Kaufman	1	0	3	0	1	0	1	0	2	1	9
Delia DeJong	0	2	0	1	0	1	0	3	0	0	7

=== Draw 6 ===
Friday, January 23, 9:00 am

Team	1	2	3	4	5	6	7	8	9	10	Final
Teryn Hamilton	0	0	1	0	2	1	0	3	X	X	7
Deanne Nichol	0	0	0	0	0	0	1	0	X	X	1

Team	1	2	3	4	5	6	7	8	9	10	Final
Shannon Kleibrink	1	0	3	0	0	1	0	1	1	1	8
Karynn Flory	0	1	0	2	1	0	2	0	0	0	6

Team	1	2	3	4	5	6	7	8	9	10	Final
Crystal Webster	0	0	3	0	1	0	3	0	1	1	9
Tiffany Game	2	0	0	1	0	2	0	2	0	0	7

=== Draw 7 ===
Friday, January 23, 2:00 pm

Team	1	2	3	4	5	6	7	8	9	10	11	Final
Heather Nedohin	0	2	0	0	2	1	0	2	0	0	1	8
Casey Scheidegger	1	0	1	1	0	0	2	0	1	1	0	7

Team	1	2	3	4	5	6	7	8	9	10	Final
Nicky Kaufman	0	0	2	0	0	1	0	1	0	X	4
Chelsea Carey	0	1	0	1	2	0	1	0	1	X	6

=== Draw 8 ===
Friday, January 23, 6:30 pm

Team	1	2	3	4	5	6	7	8	9	10	Final
Heather Nedohin	0	0	2	1	0	0	0	0	1	2	6
Chelsea Carey	0	0	0	0	1	0	1	1	0	0	3

Team	1	2	3	4	5	6	7	8	9	10	Final
Teryn Hamilton	0	2	0	0	0	2	0	1	0	1	6
Nicky Kaufman	2	0	0	1	0	0	1	0	1	0	5

Team	1	2	3	4	5	6	7	8	9	10	11	Final
Delia DeJong	0	1	0	1	0	1	1	0	2	0	0	6
Casey Scheidegger	1	0	1	0	1	0	0	1	0	2	2	8

Team	1	2	3	4	5	6	7	8	9	10	Final
Shannon Kleibrink	0	0	0	1	1	0	1	0	X	X	3
Crystal Webster	1	1	2	0	0	1	0	3	X	X	8

=== Draw 9 ===
Saturday, January 24, 1:00 pm

Team	1	2	3	4	5	6	7	8	9	10	Final
Teryn Hamilton	2	0	0	0	1	0	0	1	0	X	4
Casey Scheidegger	0	1	2	0	0	3	1	0	1	X	8

Team	1	2	3	4	5	6	7	8	9	10	Final
Crystal Webster	0	0	0	1	0	1	0	1	0	X	3
Chelsea Carey	0	1	1	0	1	0	2	0	1	X	6

== Playoffs ==
Page playoff system
A	Val Sweeting	3
B	Heather Nedohin	2
C1	Casey Scheidegger	4
C2	Chelsea Carey	7

Semifinal
B	Heather Nedohin	5
C2	Chelsea Carey	7

Final
A	Val Sweeting	9
C2	Chelsea Carey	7

=== A vs. B ===
Saturday, January 24, 6:30 pm

Team	1	2	3	4	5	6	7	8	9	10	Final
Val Sweeting	0	0	0	1	0	1	0	0	0	1	3
Heather Nedohin	0	0	0	0	1	0	0	0	1	0	2

=== C1 vs. C2 ===
Saturday, January 24, 6:30 pm

Team	1	2	3	4	5	6	7	8	9	10	Final
Casey Scheidegger	0	0	0	1	0	1	0	0	2	0	4
Chelsea Carey	0	1	1	0	1	0	0	1	0	3	7

=== Semifinal ===
Sunday, January 25, 9:30 am

Team	1	2	3	4	5	6	7	8	9	10	Final
Heather Nedohin	0	2	0	0	2	0	1	0	0	0	5
Chelsea Carey	0	0	2	0	0	2	0	2	0	1	7

=== Final ===
Sunday, January 25, 2:00 pm

Team	1	2	3	4	5	6	7	8	9	10	Final
Val Sweeting	2	0	0	1	0	3	0	2	0	1	9
Chelsea Carey	0	1	1	0	1	0	2	0	2	0	7

2015 Alberta Scotties Tournament of Hearts

Val Sweeting
3rd Alberta Provincial Championship title
