= 2016 Alberta Scotties Tournament of Hearts =

2016 Jiffy Lube Alberta Scotties Tournament of Hearts
- Host city: Calgary, Alberta
- Arena: North Hill Curling Club
- Dates: January 20–24
- Winner: Team Carey
- Curling club: The Glencoe Club, Calgary
- Skip: Chelsea Carey
- Third: Amy Nixon
- Second: Jocelyn Peterman
- Lead: Laine Peters
- Finalist: Val Sweeting

The 2016 Jiffy Lube Alberta Scotties Tournament of Hearts, Alberta's provincial women's curling championship, was held from January 20 to 24 at the North Hill Curling Club in Calgary. The winning Chelsea Carey team represented Alberta at the 2016 Scotties Tournament of Hearts in Grande Prairie.

The event was not immune to the season's broomgate controversy. One of the rules instituted that season was that teams could only use brooms that were "commercially available", as in not especially made for teams. By the time of the season's provincial playdowns, hair brooms (which had yet to be banned) were seen as being the most effective brush heads available, and as a result, the most effective hair broom produced by Goldline had sold out. Goldline removed the product from their website, which meant they were no longer "commercially available", causing some teams to claim that that meant they were therefore illegal to use. Some teams had to contact Goldline to put the product back on their site (but indicating it was "sold out") in order to circumvent the ad-hoc rules. The dispute resulted in a "very contentious" Alberta final.

== Teams ==
The teams are listed as follows:

Skip	Third	Second	Lead	Club(s)
Chelsea Carey	Amy Nixon	Jocelyn Peterman	Laine Peters	The Glencoe Club, Calgary
Nadine Chyz	Heather Jensen	Whitney Eckstrand	Heather Rogers	The Glencoe Club, Calgary / Red Deer Curling Club, Red Deer / Airdrie Curling Club, Airdrie
Trisha James	Michelle Gnam	Josie Jorgensen	Patty Przbylski	Fairview Curling Club, Fairview
Jessie Kaufman	Erin Carmody	Lynnelle Mahé	Kim Curtin	Avonair Curling Club, Edmonton
Nicky Kaufman	Holly Baird	Deena Benoit	Pamela Appelman	Avonair Curling Club, Edmonton
Shannon Kleibrink	Lisa Eyamie	Sarah Wilkes	Alison Kotylak	Coaldale Granite Club, Coaldale
Barb Lund	Patty Hayes	Eileen Lund	Diane Wiebe	Fairview Curling Club, Fairview
Jodi Marthaller	Tessa Ruetz	Nicole Larson	Valerie Ekelund	Lethbridge Curling Club, Lethbridge
Deanne Nichol	Candace Read	Chana Martineau	Jennifer Sheehan	Saville Sports Centre, Edmonton
Kelsey Rocque	Laura Crocker	Taylor McDonald	Jen Gates	Saville Sports Centre, Edmonton
Casey Scheidegger	Cary-Anne McTaggart	Jessie Scheidegger	Stephanie Enright	Lethbridge Curling Club, Lethbridge
Val Sweeting	Lori Olson-Johns	Dana Ferguson	Rachelle Brown	Saville Sports Centre, Edmonton

== Knockout Draw Brackets ==
The draw is listed as follows:

=== A Event ===
First Knockout
Jodi Marthaller	3
Jessie Kaufman	10
Shannon Kleibrink	13
Trisha James	4
Nicky Kaufman	8
Barb Lund	5
Nadine Chyz	5
Deanne Nichol	6

Quarterfinals
Val Sweeting	5
Jessie Kaufman	4
Shannon Kleibrink	4
Casey Scheidegger	8
Chelsea Carey	7
Nicky Kaufman	5
Deanne Nichol	11
Kelsey Rocque	8

Semifinals
Val Sweeting	10
Casey Scheidegger	7
Chelsea Carey	9
Deanne Nichol	1

A Qualifier
Val Sweeting	8
Chelsea Carey	3

=== B Event ===
Second Knockout
Shannon Kleibrink	10
Jodi Marthaller	4
Nicky Kaufman	13
Trisha James	4
Kelsey Rocque	12
Barb Lund	0
Jessie Kaufman	7
Nadine Chyz	4

Quarterfinals
Shannon Kleibrink	7
Deanne Nichol	4
Nicky Kaufman	4
Casey Scheidegger	7
Kelsey Rocque	5
Jessie Kaufman	6

Semifinals
Shannon Kleibrink	11
Casey Scheidegger	8
Jessie Kaufman	7
Chelsea Carey	9

B Qualifier
Shannon Kleibrink	4
Chelsea Carey	5

=== C Event ===
Third Knockout
Jodi Marthaller	11
Trisha James	5

Semifinals
Jodi Marthaller	5
Jessie Kaufman	10
Kelsey Rocque	2
Casey Scheidegger	8

C Qualifier 2
Jessie Kaufman	9
Casey Scheidegger	7

Third Knockout		Semifinals		C Qualifier 2
Deanne Nichol	8
Barb Lund	7	Deanne Nichol	3
Nicky Kaufman	4	Nadine Chyz	10
Nadine Chyz	10			Nadine Chyz	5
				Shannon Kleibrink	4

== Playoffs ==
Page playoff system
A	Val Sweeting	5
B	Chelsea Carey	4
C1	Jessie Kaufman	7
C2	Nadine Chyz	3

Semifinal
B	Chelsea Carey	9
C1	Jessie Kaufman	3

Final
A	Val Sweeting	5
B	Chelsea Carey	8

=== A vs B ===
Saturday, January 23, 6:30pm

Team	1	2	3	4	5	6	7	8	9	10	Final
Val Sweeting 🔨	0	1	0	1	1	0	0	1	0	1	5
Chelsea Carey	0	0	1	0	0	1	2	0	0	0	4

=== C1 vs C2 ===
Saturday, January 23, 6:30pm

Team	1	2	3	4	5	6	7	8	9	10	Final
Jessie Kaufman 🔨	0	2	0	1	1	1	0	1	1	X	7
Nadine Chyz	0	0	1	0	0	0	2	0	0	X	3

=== Semifinal ===
Sunday, January 24, 9:30am

Team	1	2	3	4	5	6	7	8	9	10	Final
Chelsea Carey 🔨	2	1	1	1	0	2	2	0	X	X	9
Jessie Kaufman	0	0	0	0	1	0	0	2	X	X	3

=== Final ===
Sunday, January 24, 2:00 pm

Team	1	2	3	4	5	6	7	8	9	10	Final
Val Sweeting 🔨	0	2	0	1	0	1	0	1	0	X	5
Chelsea Carey	0	0	1	0	1	0	3	0	3	X	8

2016 Alberta Scotties Tournament of Hearts

Chelsea Carey
1st Alberta Provincial Championship title
