= 2014 Alberta Scotties Tournament of Hearts =

2014 Jiffy Lube Alberta Scotties Tournament of Hearts
- Host city: Sylvan Lake, Alberta
- Arena: Sylvan Lake Curling Club
- Dates: January 8–12
- Winner: Team Sweeting
- Curling club: Saville SC, Edmonton
- Skip: Val Sweeting
- Third: Dana Ferguson
- Second: Joanne Courtney
- Lead: Rachelle Pidherny
- Finalist: Cheryl Bernard

The 2014 Alberta Scotties Tournament of Hearts, the provincial women's curling championship for Alberta, was held from January 8 to 12 at the Sylvan Lake Curling Club in Sylvan Lake. The winning Val Sweeting team represented Alberta at the 2014 Scotties Tournament of Hearts in Montreal.

== Teams ==
The teams are listed as follows:

Skip	Third	Second	Lead	Club(s)
Heather Nedohin	Beth Iskiw	Jessica Mair	Laine Peters	Saville Sports Centre, Edmonton
Renée Sonnenberg	Lawnie MacDonald	Cary-Anne Sallows	Rona Pasika	Grande Prairie Curling Club, Grande Prairie
Val Sweeting	Dana Ferguson	Joanne Courtney	Rachelle Pidherny	Saville Sports Centre, Edmonton
Tiffany Steuber	Jessie Kaufman	Dayna Demers	Stephanie Enright	Spruce Grove Curling Club, Spruce Grove
Cheryl Bernard	Susan O'Connor	Lori Olson-Johns	Shannon Aleksic	Calgary Curling Club, Calgary
Casey Scheidegger	Denise Kinghorn	Jessie Scheidegger	Kimberley Anderson	Lethbridge Curling Club, Lethbridge
Delia DeJong	Amy Janko	Brittany Whittemore	Mikki Reddick	Sexsmith Curling Club, Sexsmith
Deanne Nichol	Dawn Corbeil	Sandra Sharp	Audra Lindsey	Peace River Curling Club, Peace River
Crystal Webster	Cathy Overton-Clapham	Geri-Lynn Ramsay	Samantha Preston	Glencoe Curling Club, Calgary
Tiffany Game	Vanessa Pouliot	Jennifer VanWieren	Melissa Pierce	Crestwood Curling Club, Edmonton
Chana Martineau	Candace Read	Kara Lindholm	Kandace Lindholm	Saville Sports Centre, Edmonton
Kelly Erickson	Lindsay Makichuk	Kristina Hadden	Alison Kotylak	Saville Sports Centre, Edmonton

== Knockout Draw Brackets ==
The draw is listed as follows:

=== A event ===
First Knockout
Tiffany Game	7
Delia DeJong	6
Crystal Webster	7
Deanne Nichol	6
Kelly Erickson	3
Tiffany Steuber	6
Casey Scheidegger	8
Chana Martineau	7

Quarterfinals
Heather Nedohin	8
Tiffany Game	7
Crystal Webster	5
Cheryl Bernard	6
Val Sweeting	6
Tiffany Steuber	3
Renée Sonnenberg	5
Casey Scheidegger	8

Semifinals
Heather Nedohin	8
Cheryl Bernard	5
Val Sweeting	8
Casey Scheidegger	5

A Qualifier
Heather Nedohin	6
Val Sweeting	8

=== B event ===
Second Knockout
Delia DeJong	5
Crystal Webster	8
Deanne Nichol	2
Renée Sonnenberg	9
Chana Martineau	2
Tiffany Steuber	9
Tiffany Game	10
Kelly Erickson	7

Quarterfinals
Casey Scheidegger	6
Crystal Webster	8
Cheryl Bernard	8
Renée Sonnenberg	2
Tiffany Steuber	7
Tiffany Game	6

Semifinals
Crystal Webster	9
Cheryl Bernard	5
Heather Nedohin	6
Tiffany Steuber	5

B Qualifier
Crystal Webster	4
Heather Nedohin	5

=== C event ===
Third Knockout
Delia DeJong	10
Deanne Nichol	2

Semifinals
Delia DeJong	7
Tiffany Steuber	9
Tiffany Game	3
Cheryl Bernard	10

C Qualifier 1
Tiffany Steuber	4
Cheryl Bernard	5

Third Knockout		Semifinals		C Qualifier 2
Casey Scheidegger	8
Chana Martineau	6	Casey Scheidegger	5
Renée Sonnenberg	8	Renée Sonnenberg	7
Kelly Erickson	1			Renée Sonnenberg	4
				Crystal Webster	9

== Knockout results ==
=== Draw 1 ===
Wednesday, January 8, 9:30 am

Sheet A	1	2	3	4	5	6	7	8	9	10	Final
Casey Scheidegger	0	0	2	0	3	0	0	2	0	1	8
Chana Martineau	2	1	0	1	0	1	0	0	2	0	7

Sheet B	1	2	3	4	5	6	7	8	9	10	Final
Crystal Webster	0	0	1	1	1	0	3	0	0	1	7
Deanne Nichol	0	3	0	0	0	1	0	2	0	0	6

Sheet C	1	2	3	4	5	6	7	8	9	10	Final
Tiffany Game	1	1	1	0	1	1	0	1	0	1	7
Delia DeJong	0	0	0	2	0	0	2	0	2	0	6

Sheet D	1	2	3	4	5	6	7	8	9	10	Final
Kelly Erickson	0	0	0	0	0	1	0	0	2	0	3
Tiffany Steuber	0	0	0	0	2	0	0	3	0	1	6

=== Draw 2 ===
Wednesday, January 8, 6:30 pm

Sheet A	1	2	3	4	5	6	7	8	9	10	11	Final
Cheryl Bernard	0	2	0	1	0	0	0	1	0	1	1	6
Crystal Webster	0	0	1	0	1	2	0	0	1	0	0	5

Sheet B	1	2	3	4	5	6	7	8	9	10	11	Final
Tiffany Game	0	1	0	2	0	1	0	1	0	2	0	7
Heather Nedohin	1	0	2	0	1	0	1	0	2	0	1	8

Sheet C	1	2	3	4	5	6	7	8	9	10	Final
Renée Sonnenberg	0	0	1	0	1	0	1	2	0	X	5
Casey Scheidegger	1	1	0	3	0	1	0	0	2	X	8

Sheet D	1	2	3	4	5	6	7	8	9	10	Final
Val Sweeting	0	0	0	1	0	0	2	0	1	2	6
Tiffany Steuber	0	0	0	0	0	1	0	2	0	0	3

=== Draw 3 ===
Thursday, January 9, 9:00 am

Sheet B	1	2	3	4	5	6	7	8	9	10	Final
Val Sweeting	1	0	0	0	2	0	2	0	2	1	8
Casey Scheidegger	0	1	2	0	0	1	0	1	0	0	5

Sheet D	1	2	3	4	5	6	7	8	9	10	Final
Cheryl Bernard	0	1	1	1	0	0	2	0	0	X	5
Heather Nedohin	2	0	0	0	2	0	0	2	2	X	8

=== Draw 4 ===
Thursday, January 9, 2:00 pm

Sheet A	1	2	3	4	5	6	7	8	9	10	Final
Tiffany Game	0	3	0	2	0	4	0	1	0	X	10
Kelly Erickson	2	0	2	0	0	0	2	0	1	X	7

Sheet B	1	2	3	4	5	6	7	8	9	10	Final
Chana Martineau	0	0	1	0	1	0	0	0	X	X	2
Tiffany Steuber	0	2	0	2	0	2	1	2	X	X	9

Sheet C	1	2	3	4	5	6	7	8	9	10	Final
Deanne Nichol	0	0	0	1	1	0	0	X	X	X	2
Renée Sonnenberg	1	1	2	0	0	4	1	X	X	X	9

Sheet D	1	2	3	4	5	6	7	8	9	10	Final
Delia DeJong	1	1	0	0	0	2	0	0	1	0	5
Crystal Webster	0	0	4	0	1	0	0	1	0	2	8

=== Draw 5 ===
Thursday, January 9, 6:30 pm

Sheet A	1	2	3	4	5	6	7	8	9	10	Final
Crystal Webster	0	1	0	1	1	0	2	2	0	1	8
Casey Scheidegger	1	0	1	0	0	2	0	0	2	0	6

Sheet B	1	2	3	4	5	6	7	8	9	10	Final
Renée Sonnenberg	0	0	0	0	2	0	0	X	X	X	2
Cheryl Bernard	1	1	0	2	0	2	2	X	X	X	8

Sheet C	1	2	3	4	5	6	7	8	9	10	Final
Heather Nedohin	0	2	0	1	0	1	0	2	0	X	6
Val Sweeting	2	0	1	0	2	0	2	0	1	X	8

Sheet D	1	2	3	4	5	6	7	8	9	10	11	Final
Tiffany Steuber	0	0	0	1	0	1	2	0	2	0	1	7
Tiffany Game	1	0	0	0	2	0	0	1	0	2	0	6

=== Draw 6 ===
Friday, January 10, 9:00 am

Sheet A	1	2	3	4	5	6	7	8	9	10	Final
Delia DeJong	2	1	0	0	3	1	0	3	X	X	10
Deanne Nichol	0	0	1	0	0	0	1	0	X	X	2

Sheet C	1	2	3	4	5	6	7	8	9	10	Final
Renée Sonnenberg	0	0	1	4	0	3	X	X	X	X	8
Kelly Erickson	0	0	0	0	1	0	X	X	X	X	1

Sheet D	1	2	3	4	5	6	7	8	9	10	11	Final
Casey Scheidegger	0	2	0	1	0	2	1	0	0	0	2	8
Chana Martineau	0	0	1	0	1	0	0	1	1	2	0	6

=== Draw 7 ===
Friday, January 10, 2:00 pm

Sheet B	1	2	3	4	5	6	7	8	9	10	Final
Tiffany Steuber	1	1	0	0	1	0	0	2	0	0	5
Heather Nedohin	0	0	1	1	0	0	2	0	1	1	6

Sheet D	1	2	3	4	5	6	7	8	9	10	Final
Crystal Webster	0	2	0	2	0	1	0	2	2	X	9
Cheryl Bernard	2	0	2	0	0	0	1	0	0	X	5

=== Draw 8 ===
Friday, January 10, 6:30 pm

Sheet A	1	2	3	4	5	6	7	8	9	10	Final
Tiffany Game	0	1	0	0	2	0	X	X	X	X	3
Cheryl Bernard	4	0	2	3	0	1	X	X	X	X	10

Sheet B	1	2	3	4	5	6	7	8	9	10	Final
Casey Scheidegger	0	2	0	1	0	1	0	1	0	0	5
Renée Sonnenberg	2	0	1	0	1	0	1	0	0	2	7

Sheet C	1	2	3	4	5	6	7	8	9	10	Final
Crystal Webster	0	0	0	1	0	2	0	1	0	0	4
Heather Nedohin	1	0	0	0	1	0	1	0	1	1	5

Sheet D	1	2	3	4	5	6	7	8	9	10	Final
Delia DeJong	0	2	2	0	1	0	1	0	1	0	7
Tiffany Steuber	2	0	0	3	0	1	0	2	0	1	9

=== Draw 9 ===
Saturday, January 11, 1:00 pm

Sheet C	1	2	3	4	5	6	7	8	9	10	Final
Tiffany Steuber	0	0	0	1	0	0	1	0	2	0	4
Cheryl Bernard	0	1	0	0	1	1	0	1	0	1	5

Sheet D	1	2	3	4	5	6	7	8	9	10	Final
Renée Sonnenberg	0	1	0	1	0	0	2	0	X	X	4
Crystal Webster	1	0	2	0	0	1	0	5	X	X	9

== Playoffs ==
Page playoff system
A	Val Sweeting	6
B	Heather Nedohin	5
C1	Cheryl Bernard	10
C2	Crystal Webster	9

Semifinal
B	Heather Nedohin	5
C1	Cheryl Bernard	7

Final
A	Val Sweeting	8
C1	Cheryl Bernard	4

=== A vs. B ===
Saturday, January 11, 6:30 pm

Sheet C	1	2	3	4	5	6	7	8	9	10	Final
Val Sweeting	0	1	0	2	1	0	2	0	0	0	6
Heather Nedohin	0	0	2	0	0	1	0	1	0	1	5

=== C1 vs. C2 ===
Saturday, January 11, 6:30 pm

Sheet A	1	2	3	4	5	6	7	8	9	10	11	Final
Cheryl Bernard	3	0	2	0	1	0	1	0	2	0	1	10
Crystal Webster	0	2	0	1	0	2	0	2	0	2	0	9

=== Semifinal ===
Sunday, January 12, 8:30 am

Sheet B	1	2	3	4	5	6	7	8	9	10	Final
Heather Nedohin	1	0	0	0	2	0	1	1	0	X	5
Cheryl Bernard	0	4	0	0	0	1	0	0	2	X	7

=== Final ===
Sunday, January 12, 1:30 pm

Sheet C	1	2	3	4	5	6	7	8	9	10	Final
Val Sweeting	0	3	0	0	1	0	2	0	2	X	8
Cheryl Bernard	0	0	1	1	0	1	0	1	0	X	4

2014 Alberta Scotties Tournament of Hearts

Val Sweeting
2nd Alberta Provincial Championship title
