= 2011 Alberta Scotties Tournament of Hearts =

- Host city: Camrose, Alberta
- Arena: Edgeworth Centre Encana Arena
- Dates: January 26–30, 2011
- Winner: Team Kleibrink
- Curling club: Calgary Winter Club, Calgary
- Skip: Shannon Kleibrink
- Third: Amy Nixon
- Second: Bronwen Webster
- Lead: Chelsey Bell
- Finalist: Heather Nedohin

The 2011 Alberta Scotties Tournament of Hearts was the 2011 edition of the Alberta provincial women's curling championship. It was held January 26–30 at the Edgeworth Centre Encana Arena in Camrose, Alberta. The winning team of Shannon Kleibrink represented Alberta at the 2011 Scotties Tournament of Hearts in Charlottetown, Prince Edward Island, finishing 6-5 in round robin play.

== Teams ==
Skip	Vice	Second	Lead	Club
Cheryl Bernard	Susan O'Connor	Carolyn Darbyshire	Cori Morris	Calgary Curling Club, Calgary Winter Club, Calgary
Tanilla Doyle	Lindsay Amundsen	Janice Bailey	Christina Faulkner	Highwood Curling Club, High River
Dana Ferguson	Kara Johnston	Marie Miller	Rachelle Pidherny	Saville Sports Centre, Edmonton
Jessie Kaufman	Nicky Kaufman	Amanda-Dawn Coderre	Stephanie Enright	Saville Sports Centre, Edmonton
Shannon Kleibrink	Amy Nixon	Bronwen Webster	Chelsey Bell	Calgary Winter Club, Calgary
Heather Nedohin	Beth Iskiw	Jessica Mair	Laine Peters	Saville Sports Centre, Edmonton
Desiree Owen	Kalynn Park	Cary-Anne Sallows	Stephanie Malekoff	Saville Sports Centre, Edmonton
Heather Rankin	Glenys Bakker	Heather Jensen	Carly Quigley	Calgary Winter Club, Calgary
Casey Scheidegger	Allison Nimik	Jody Keim	Lace Dupont	Lethbridge Curling Club, Lethbridge
Renee Sonnenberg	Lawnie MacDonald	Kristie Moore	Rona Pasika	Saville Sports Centre, Edmonton
Val Sweeting	Leslie Rogers	Megan Einarson	Whitney More	Saville Sports Centre, Edmonton
Crystal Webster	Lori Olsen-Johns	Joanne Taylor	Samantha Preston	Calgary Winter Club, Calgary

== Standings ==
Skip (Club)	W	L	PF	PA	Ends Won	Ends Lost	Blank Ends	Stolen Ends
Cheryl Bernard (Calgary Curling Club)	4	1	36	21	21	19	6	8
Dana Ferguson (Saville Sports Centre)	4	2	44	35	26	24	5	6
Heather Nedohin (Saville Sports Centre)	4	2	42	30	26	21	7	4
Shannon Kleibrink (Calgary Winter Club)	3	0	25	11	14	7	3	5
Renee Sonnenberg (Saville Sports Centre)	2	3	25	26	16	23	3	4
Desiree Owen (Saville Sports Centre)	2	3	29	37	19	22	5	5
Crystal Webster (Calgary Winter Club)	3	3	31	35	23	21	6	5
Jessie Kaufman (Saville Sports Centre)	2	3	32	31	16	21	3	3
Casey Scheidegger (Lethbridge Curling Club)	2	3	23	27	17	15	5	5
Val Sweeting (Saville Sports Centre)	1	3	24	26	16	14	4	6
Tanilla Doyle (Highwood Curling Club)	1	3	18	34	16	15	1	3
Heather Rankin (Calgary Winter Club)	1	3	17	31	13	17	4	4

== Draw Brackets ==
=== A Event ===
Round of 16
Webster	5
Scheidegger	3
Sweeting	11
Doyle	2
A3	Owen	3
A3	Ferguson	10
A4	Sonnenberg	7
A4	Rankin	8

Quarterfinals
A5	Bernard	4
A1	Webster	5
A2	Sweeting	3
A6	Kaufman	10
A7	Nedohin	10
A3	Ferguson	3
A4	Rankin	1
A8	Kleibrink	7

Semifinals
A5	Webster	7
A6	Kaufman	1
A7	Nedohin	6
A8	Kleibrink	8

A Qualifier
A9	Webster	4
A10	Kleibrink	10

=== B Event ===
Round of 16
Sweeting	3
Scheidegger	5
Ferguson	5
Doyle	7
A8	Rankin	6
A3	Owen	7
A5	Bernard	10
A4	Sonnenberg	1

Quarterfinals
A10	Nedohin	8
B1	Scheidegger	2
A9	Kaufman	10
B2	Doyle	4
B3	Owen	4
B4	Bernard	8

Semifinals
B5	Nedohin	7
B6	Kaufman	6
B7	Bernard	8
A11	Webster	7

B Qualifier
B8	Nedohin	5
B9	Bernard	6

=== C Event ===
Quarterfinals			Semifinals			C Qualifier 1
			C1	Ferguson	9
B1	Sweeting	7	B9	Webster	3
B2	Ferguson	9				C4	Ferguson	8
						C5	Owen	5
			B7	Owen	10
			B8	Kaufman	5

Quarterfinals			Semifinals			C Qualifier 2
B5	Scheidegger	10
B3	Rankin	2	C2	Scheidegger	3
B4	Sonnenberg	8	C3	Sonnenberg	9
B6	Doyle	5				C6	Sonnenberg	5
						B10	Nedohin	6

== Results ==
=== Draw 1 ===
January 26, 9:30 AM MT

Sheet A	1	2	3	4	5	6	7	8	9	10	Final
Webster 🔨	2	1	0	1	0	0	1	0	0	X	5
Scheidegger	0	0	1	0	0	1	0	1	0	X	3

Sheet B	1	2	3	4	5	6	7	8	9	10	Final
Sweeting 🔨	2	0	2	2	0	5	X	X	X	X	11
Doyle	0	1	0	0	1	0	X	X	X	X	2

Sheet C	1	2	3	4	5	6	7	8	9	10	Final
Owen	0	0	0	0	0	1	0	2	0	X	3
Ferguson 🔨	0	1	1	1	1	0	3	0	3	X	10

Sheet D	1	2	3	4	5	6	7	8	9	10	11	Final
Sonnenberg	0	3	0	0	2	0	0	0	1	1	0	7
Rankin 🔨	3	0	1	1	0	0	1	1	0	0	1	8

=== Draw 2 ===
January 26, 6:30 PM MT

Sheet A	1	2	3	4	5	6	7	8	9	10	11	Final
Bernard	0	0	0	0	0	1	1	0	1	1	0	4
Webster 🔨	1	0	1	1	0	0	0	1	0	0	1	5

Sheet B	1	2	3	4	5	6	7	8	9	10	Final
Sweeting	0	1	1	0	0	1	0	X	X	X	3
Kaufman 🔨	4	0	0	3	0	0	3	X	X	X	10

Sheet C	1	2	3	4	5	6	7	8	9	10	Final
Nedohin 🔨	4	0	1	0	0	1	0	4	X	X	10
Ferguson	0	1	0	1	0	0	1	0	X	X	3

Sheet D	1	2	3	4	5	6	7	8	9	10	Final
Rankin 🔨	0	0	0	0	1	0	0	X	X	X	1
Kleibrink	2	0	1	2	0	1	1	X	X	X	7

=== Draw 3 ===
January 27, 9:00 AM MT

Sheet A	1	2	3	4	5	6	7	8	9	10	Final
Webster 🔨	1	0	1	0	0	3	2	X	X	X	7
Kaufman	0	0	0	1	0	0	0	X	X	X	1

Sheet B	1	2	3	4	5	6	7	8	9	10	Final
Nedohin	0	1	0	2	0	2	0	1	0	0	6
Kleibrink 🔨	3	0	2	0	0	0	1	0	1	1	8

=== Draw 4 ===
January 27, 2:00 PM MT

Sheet A	1	2	3	4	5	6	7	8	9	10	Final
Scheidegger 🔨	0	0	0	0	1	0	0	2	1	1	5
Sweeting	0	0	0	1	0	1	1	0	0	0	3

Sheet B	1	2	3	4	5	6	7	8	9	10	Final
Ferguson	0	0	2	0	0	2	0	0	1	0	5
Doyle 🔨	0	1	0	1	1	0	2	1	0	1	7

Sheet C	1	2	3	4	5	6	7	8	9	10	Final
Owen	0	0	1	3	1	0	2	0	0	0	7
Rankin 🔨	0	0	0	0	0	3	0	1	1	1	6

Sheet D	1	2	3	4	5	6	7	8	9	10	Final
Sonnenberg 🔨	0	0	1	0	0	0	X	X	X	X	1
Bernard	1	2	0	3	1	3	X	X	X	X	10

=== Draw 5 ===
January 27, 6:30 PM MT

Sheet A	1	2	3	4	5	6	7	8	9	10	Final
Scheidegger	0	1	0	1	0	0	X	X	X	X	2
Nedohin 🔨	2	0	4	0	1	1	X	X	X	X	8

Sheet B	1	2	3	4	5	6	7	8	9	10	Final
Doyle 🔨	1	0	0	2	0	0	1	X	X	X	4
Kaufman	0	4	3	0	2	1	0	X	X	X	10

Sheet C	1	2	3	4	5	6	7	8	9	10	Final
Owen 🔨	0	1	0	1	1	0	1	0	0	X	4
Bernard	0	0	1	0	0	4	0	2	1	X	8

=== A Final ===
January 27, 6:30 PM MT

Sheet D	1	2	3	4	5	6	7	8	9	10	Final
Webster	0	3	0	0	0	1	0	X	X	X	4
Kleibrink 🔨	5	0	0	2	1	0	2	X	X	X	10

=== Draw 6 ===
January 28, 9:00 AM MT

Sheet A	1	2	3	4	5	6	7	8	9	10	11	Final
Sweeting	0	2	1	1	0	1	0	1	0	1	0	7
Ferguson 🔨	1	0	0	0	2	0	2	0	2	0	2	9

Sheet B	1	2	3	4	5	6	7	8	9	10	Final
Rankin	1	0	0	1	0	0	X	X	X	X	2
Scheidegger 🔨	0	1	3	0	2	4	X	X	X	X	10

Sheet C	1	2	3	4	5	6	7	8	9	10	Final
Sonnenberg 🔨	0	3	2	0	0	1	0	2	0	X	8
Doyle	1	0	0	1	1	0	1	0	1	X	5

=== Draw 7 ===
January 28, 2:00 PM MT

Sheet A	1	2	3	4	5	6	7	8	9	10	Final
Nedohin 🔨	2	0	2	0	1	0	0	1	0	1	7
Kaufman	0	1	0	1	0	2	1	0	1	0	6

Sheet B	1	2	3	4	5	6	7	8	9	10	Final
Bernard 🔨	1	0	2	3	0	1	0	1	0	0	8
Webster	0	1	0	0	2	0	1	0	2	1	7

=== Draw 8 ===
January 28, 6:30 PM MT

Sheet A	1	2	3	4	5	6	7	8	9	10	Final
Ferguson	0	2	0	1	5	0	1	0	X	X	9
Webster 🔨	1	0	0	0	0	1	0	1	X	X	3

Sheet B	1	2	3	4	5	6	7	8	9	10	Final
Owen	1	2	0	1	1	0	2	0	3	X	10
Kaufman 🔨	0	0	1	0	0	2	0	2	0	X	5

Sheet C	1	2	3	4	5	6	7	8	9	10	Final
Scheidegger	1	0	0	0	2	0	X	X	X	X	3
Sonnenberg 🔨	0	1	4	2	0	2	X	X	X	X	9

=== B Final ===
January 28, 6:30 PM MT

Sheet D	1	2	3	4	5	6	7	8	9	10	Final
Nedohin	0	1	0	2	0	0	0	1	1	0	5
Bernard 🔨	0	0	4	0	0	1	0	0	0	1	6

=== C Final 1 ===
January 29, 1:00 PM MT

Sheet A	1	2	3	4	5	6	7	8	9	10	Final
Ferguson 🔨	0	2	1	0	1	2	0	0	2	X	8
Owen	0	0	0	3	0	0	1	1	0	X	5

=== C Final 2 ===
January 29, 1:00 PM MT

Sheet B	1	2	3	4	5	6	7	8	9	10	Final
Sonnenberg	0	1	0	2	0	0	0	0	2	0	5
Nedohin 🔨	0	0	1	0	2	1	0	1	0	1	6

== Playoffs ==
Page playoff system
A1	Shannon Kleibrink	9
B1	Cheryl Bernard	8
C1	Dana Ferguson	4
C2	Heather Nedohin	8

Semifinal
B1	Cheryl Bernard	6
C2	Heather Nedohin	7

Final
A1	Shannon Kleibrink	9
C2	Heather Nedohin	4

=== A1 vs. B1 ===
January 29, 6:30 PM MT

Sheet C	1	2	3	4	5	6	7	8	9	10	11	Final
Kleibrink 🔨	2	0	2	0	1	0	2	0	1	0	1	9
Bernard	0	1	0	1	0	1	0	4	0	1	0	8

=== C1 vs. C2 ===
January 29, 6:30 PM MT

Sheet A	1	2	3	4	5	6	7	8	9	10	Final
Ferguson	0	0	1	0	1	0	1	1	0	X	4
Nedohin 🔨	1	1	0	2	0	2	0	0	2	X	8

=== Semifinal ===
January 30, 9:30 AM MT

Sheet B	1	2	3	4	5	6	7	8	9	10	11	Final
Bernard 🔨	2	0	0	1	0	1	0	1	1	0	0	6
Nedohin	0	1	0	0	2	0	2	0	0	1	1	7

=== Final ===
January 30, 2:00 PM MT

Sheet C	1	2	3	4	5	6	7	8	9	10	Final
Kleibrink 🔨	2	1	0	2	0	1	1	0	2	X	9
Nedohin	0	0	1	0	2	0	0	1	0	X	4
