= Casey Scheidegger =

Canadian curler (born 1988)

- Curler
- Born: January 31, 1988 (age 38); Red Deer, Alberta, Canada

Team
- Curling club: Lethbridge CC, Lethbridge, AB

Curling career
- Member Association: Alberta
- Hearts: 3 (2018, 2019, 2023)
- Top CTRS ranking: 5th (2016–17, 2018–19)
- Grand Slam victories: 1 (2017 Canadian Open)

Casey Scheidegger (born January 31, 1988) is a Canadian curler from Lethbridge, Alberta. She is a former provincial junior champion. She currently coaches the University of Lethbridge curling team.

== Career ==
=== Juniors ===
Scheidegger won the 2009 Alberta Junior Curling championships with teammates Kalynn Park, younger sister Jessie Haughian, and Jayme Coutts. The rink represented Alberta at the 2009 Canadian Junior Curling Championships, where they finished the round robin in second place with a 9–3 record. However, they lost the semi-final to Manitoba's Kaitlyn Lawes.

=== Women's ===
Scheidegger has been playing in World Curling Tour events since the 2004–05 season. As of the 2019–20 season, she has played in 19 Grand Slam events, including the 2009, 2010, 2011, 2013 and 2014 editions of the Autumn Gold Curling Classic, which is no longer a Grand Slam event.

Scheidegger qualified for her first women's provincial championship in 2011, where she won two games before being eliminated after five matches. Scheidegger qualified for her second provincials in 2012 where she had the same result. She qualified once again in 2013 where she would again win her first two games, and then lose three straight. At the 2014 Alberta Scotties Tournament of Hearts, she improved upon her previous results, by winning three games before being knocked out of competition in the triple knock-out event. At the 2015 Alberta Scotties Tournament of Hearts, she finally led her team to the playoffs, before she lost to Chelsea Carey. At the 2016 Alberta Scotties Tournament of Hearts, she lost in the playoff qualifying game.

Scheidegger won her first grand slam event at the 2017 Meridian Canadian Open, which was also the first major slam she played in. Later that month, at the 2017 Alberta Scotties Tournament of Hearts, she lost in the semifinal to Val Sweeting.

Scheidegger and team played in the 2017 Canadian Olympic Curling Trials, finishing the event with a 3–5 record. Later that season, at the 2018 Alberta Scotties Tournament of Hearts, Scheidegger won the B event in the triple knockout, putting her in the A vs B page playoff against Chelsea Carey. She won that game and played Shannon Kleibrink in the final. In an extra end, she stole the win, winning the right to represent Alberta at the Scotties. At the national Scotties, Scheidegger would have a strong week, starting the tournament with a 7–1 record, but her team would take 3 key losses to finish the championship pool at 7–4, just out of the playoffs.

Scheidegger was less successful at the 2019 Alberta Scotties Tournament of Hearts, failing to qualify for the playoffs. However, strong play that season qualified her rink for a second chance in the 2019 Scotties Tournament of Hearts wild card game, where they beat Team Kerri Einarson, qualifying the team for the main event. At the Scotties, Scheidegger led her team to a 7–4 record, for a fifth-place finish, just outside the playoffs.

== Year-by-year statistics ==
Year	Team	Position	Event	Finish	Record	Pct. (Note: Round robin only)
2009	Scheidegger (LCC)	Skip	Alberta Juniors	1st	–	–
2009	Alberta (Scheidegger)	Skip	Canadian Juniors	3rd	9–3	81
2011	Scheidegger (LCC)	Skip	Alberta STOH	DNQ	2–3	–
2012	Scheidegger (LCC)	Skip	Alberta STOH	DNQ	2–3	–
2013	Scheidegger (LCC)	Skip	Alberta STOH	DNQ	2–3	–
2014	Scheidegger (LCC)	Skip	Alberta STOH	DNQ	3–3	–
2015	Scheidegger (LCC)	Skip	Alberta STOH	4th	5–3	–
2016	Scheidegger (LCC)	Skip	Alberta STOH	DNQ	3–3	–
2017	Scheidegger (LCC)	Skip	Alberta STOH	3rd	5–3	–
2017	Scheidegger	Skip	2017 COCT	6th	3–5	80
2018	Scheidegger (GPCC)	Skip	Alberta STOH	1st	6–1	–
2018	Alberta (Scheidegger)	Skip	2018 STOH	5th	7–4	81
2018	Scheidegger (LCC)	Skip	Canada Cup	4th	4–3	76
2019	Scheidegger (LCC)	Skip	Alberta STOH	DNQ	3–3	–
2019	Scheidegger (LCC)	Skip	STOH Wildcard	1st	1–0	68
2019	Wild Card (Scheidegger)	Skip	2019 STOH	5th	7–4	75
2020	Scheidegger (LCC)	Skip	Alberta STOH	T5th	2–5	–
2021	Scheidegger (LCC)	Skip	COCT – Dir.	1st	3–1	–
2021	Scheidegger	Skip	2021 COCT	5th	4–5	77
2022	Scheidegger (LCC)	Skip	Alberta STOH	2nd	7–2	
2023	Scheidegger (LCC)	Skip	Alberta STOH	2nd	7–2	
2023	Wild Card 2 (Scheidegger)	Skip	2023 STOH	12th	3–5	75
Scotties Tournament of Hearts Totals					17–13	77
Olympic Curling Trial Totals					7–10	79

== Grand Slam record ==
Scheidegger won her first ever Grand Slam event (excluding defunct events, which are not counted by media reports) when she won the 2017 Meridian Canadian Open.

Key
C	Champion
F	Lost in Final
SF	Lost in Semifinal
QF	Lost in Quarterfinals
R16	Lost in the round of 16
Q	Did not advance to playoffs
T2	Played in Tier 2 event
DNP	Did not participate in event
N/A	Not a Grand Slam event that season

Event	2016–17	2017–18	2018–19	2019–20	2020–21	2021–22	2022–23
The National	DNP	F	Q	DNP	N/A	DNP	DNP
Tour Challenge	DNP	Q	Q	DNP	N/A	N/A	Q
Masters	DNP	QF	SF	DNP	N/A	DNP	DNP
Canadian Open	C	Q	QF	DNP	N/A	N/A	Q
Players'	QF	DNP	SF	N/A	DNP	DNP	DNP
Champions Cup	Q	DNP	Q	N/A	DNP	DNP	DNP

=== Former events ===
Event	2009–10	2010–11	2011–12	2012–13	2013–14	2014–15	2015–16	2016–17	2017–18	2018–19
Elite 10	N/A	N/A	N/A	N/A	N/A	N/A	N/A	N/A	N/A	QF
Autumn Gold	Q	Q	Q	DNP	Q	Q	N/A	N/A	N/A	N/A

== Personal life ==
Scheidegger is a graduate of the University of Lethbridge. She works as a teacher with Palliser Regional Schools. She is married to Duncan Koning and they have two sons.
