= Morgan Muise =

Canadian curler

- Curler
- Born: April 18, 1985 (age 41); Halifax, Nova Scotia

Team
- Curling club: Calgary CC, Calgary, AB

Curling career
- Member Association: Nova Scotia (2004–2005; 2006–2010); New Brunswick (2005–2006); Alberta (2010–2021; 2022–2025); British Columbia (2021–2022); Northwest Territories (2025–present)
- Hearts: 2 (2006, 2022)
- Top CTRS ranking: 60th (2009–10)
Medal record
Women's curling
Representing Canada
World Junior Championships
Bronze medal – third place	2005 Pinerolo

Morgan Muise (born April 18, 1985, in Halifax, Nova Scotia) is a Canadian curler from Cochrane, Alberta.

== Career ==
At the junior level, Muise made one appearance at the Canadian Junior Curling Championships, skipping her Nova Scotia team of Michelle Woodroffe, Amanda Sedge and Ashlee Rushton. At the 2005 Canadian Junior Curling Championships, her team finished in seventh place with a 6–6 record. New Brunswick's Andrea Kelly won the tournament and took Muise as their alternate to the 2005 World Junior Curling Championships. At the World Juniors, the Kelly rink led Canada to an 8–1 round robin record, topping the field. They then lost in the semifinal to the fourth seeded Swiss team before claiming the bronze medal with a 6–4 win over Denmark's Madeleine Dupont. Muise played in one game during the tournament, beating the Swiss Tania Grivel rink 7–6 in the round robin.

The following season, Muise replaced Lianne Sobey at lead on the Kelly rink. The team entered the 2006 New Brunswick Scott Tournament of Hearts, where they would finish round robin with a first place 6–1 record, receiving a bye to the final. They would meet veteran Heidi Hanlon in the final, where the team would win 8–7 and earn the right to represent New Brunswick at the 2006 Scott Tournament of Hearts. At the Hearts, Team Kelly finished round robin with a 5–6 record. Muise returned to Nova Scotia the next season and joined the Meaghan Smart rink at third. The team played in the 2007 Nova Scotia Scotties Tournament of Hearts, where they finished seventh with a 2–5 record. Muise moved to Alberta following the 2009–10 season and formed a new team.

In 2014, Muise and her team of Lyndsay Allen, Sarah Evans and Sara Gartner Frey won the provincial club championship and represented Alberta at the 2014 Travelers Curling Club Championship. There they finished with a 3–3 round robin record, not enough to advance to the playoffs. The team also won The Good Times Bonspiel that season, defeating Jessica Hanson in the final 9–1. Two years later, Muise returned with her same team to the 2016 Travelers Curling Club Championship where her team found success. After finishing the round robin first in their pool with a 5–1 record, the team won their semifinal matchup against Ontario 7–1 to qualify for the final. After a tight final match against Manitoba's Tracy Andries, Muise's rink would allow Manitoba to take four in the last end for an 8–5 victory. Despite the loss, the Muise rink returned once more to the 2018 Travelers Curling Club Championship and qualified for the playoffs with a 5–1 record. After wins over Manitoba and the Northwest Territories in the quarterfinal and semifinal matches, Muise would win her first national championship with a 7–3 win over Nova Scotia's Michelle Williams.

Muise joined the Mary-Anne Arsenault rink as their alternate for the 2021–22 season. They competed at the 2022 British Columbia Scotties Tournament of Hearts in Kamloops from January 5 to 9. After losing to Team Kayla MacMillan in both the A Final and 1 vs. 2 page playoff game, Team Arsenault defeated MacMillan 8–6 in the final to win the provincial championship. At the 2022 Scotties Tournament of Hearts, the team finished with a 3–5 round robin record, defeating Quebec, the Northwest Territories and the Yukon in their three victories. Muise played in one game for the team, replacing Renee Simons at lead in their victory against the Northwest Territories.

=== Mixed ===
In 2022, Muise led a mixed team of Brad Kokoroyannis, Shana Snell and Ky Macaulay to victory at the Alberta mixed provincial championship, becoming the fifth woman to win a provincial mixed championship as skip. This sent the team to the 2022 Canadian Mixed Curling Championship where they missed the playoffs with a 2–4 record, eventually finishing tied for ninth with a 4–5 record following the seeding pool.

== Personal life ==
Muise works as a bookings & programs supervisor at the Spray Lake Sawmills Family Sports Centre. She is married to Marc Gustafson.

== Teams ==
Season	Skip	Third	Second	Lead	Alternate
2004–05	Morgan Muise	Michelle Woodroffe	Amanda Sedge	Ashlee Rushton	
2005–06	Andrea Kelly	Kristen MacDiarmid	Jodie deSolla	Morgan Muise	
2006–07	Meaghan Smart	Morgan Muise	Mary Gibson	Jennifer Guzzwell	
2009–10	Mary-Anne Arsenault	Marie Christianson	Morgan Muise	Kelly MacIntosh	
2010–11	Morgan Muise	Tara Tanchak	Sarah Evans	Andrea Blackwell	
2011–12	Morgan Muise	Lyndsay Allen	Sarah Evans	Michelle Collin	
2012–13	Morgan Muise	Lyndsay Allen	Sarah Evans	Sara Gartner-Frey	
2013–14	Heather Jensen	Darah Blandford	Shana Snell	Morgan Muise	
2014–15	Morgan Muise	Lyndsay Allen	Sarah Evans	Sara Gartner	
2015–16	Morgan Muise	Lyndsay Allen	Sarah Evans	Sara Gartner	
2016–17	Morgan Muise	Lyndsay Allen	Sarah Evans	Sara Gartner	
2017–18	Morgan Muise	Lyndsay Allen	Sarah Evans	Sara Gartner	
2018–19	Morgan Muise	Lyndsay Allen	Sarah Evans	Sara Gartner	
2019–20	Morgan Muise	Lyndsay Allen	Sarah Evans	Sara Gartner	
2021–22	Mary-Anne Arsenault	Jeanna Schraeder	Sasha Carter	Renee Simons	Morgan Muise
2023–24	Morgan Muise	Olivia Jones	Sydney Libbus	Emma Wiens	
2024–25	Claire Booth	Sydney Libbus	Jamie Scott	Sophie Brissette	Morgan Muise
2025–26	Morgan Muise	Reese Wainman	Brooke Smith	Carina McKay-Santurnino	
