= Heather Jensen =

Canadian curler

- Curler
- Born: Heather Moulding; March 8, 1985 (age 41); Calgary, Alberta, Canada

Curling career
- Top CTRS ranking: 9th (2008-09)

Heather Jensen (born March 8, 1985, as Heather Moulding) is a Canadian curler from Crossfield, Alberta. She most recently played third for the Nadine Scotland rink on the World Curling Tour, during the 2017-18 season.

== Curling career ==
Jensen is the former second for Heather Rankin, having played for that rink from 2006 to 2011. During that time, the team won just one tour event, the Twin Anchors Houseboat Cashspiel in 2007. The team however was a regular on the WCT circuit, and played in a total of 16 Grand Slam events. The team made the quarter-finals of a grand slam on five occasions, but never further. The team played in two provincial championships, in 2009 they won just two games and they returned in 2011 where they just won just one game. The team also qualified for the 2009 Olympic Pre-Trials. However, the team won just one game in a total of four. They also played in the 2008 Canada Cup of Curling where they went 0–5.

The Rankin rink disbanded in 2011 and Jensen moved to throw third stones for the Brenda Doroshuk/Glenys Bakker rink. This team also qualified for the provincial championship in 2012, but did not win a game and were eliminated after losing three matches.

After the 2011-12 season, Jensen formed her own team with Shana Snell, Heather Rogers and Carly Quigley (who played lead with her the previous season). The team's best result that season was a second-place finish at the 2012 Vancouver Island Shootout. Following the season, Jensen re-vamped her lineup, adding Darah Blandford at third, and Morgan Muise at lead, bumping Snell to the second position. With her new lineup, Jensen would play in her first Grand Slam event since 2010 by participating in the 2013 Curlers Corner Autumn Gold Curling Classic. However, her rink failed to make the playoffs.

== Personal life ==
Her brother Darren Moulding plays third for Team Brendan Bottcher out of the Saville Community Sports Centre in Edmonton. As of 2017, she is employed as a Canadian P3 Administrative Lead for Honeywell. She is married to Stephen Jensen.
