= Jiffy Lube =

American car care specialty store chain franchise owned by British Shell plc

Jiffy Lube International, Inc.
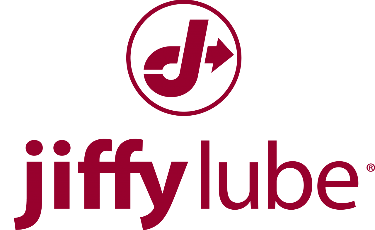

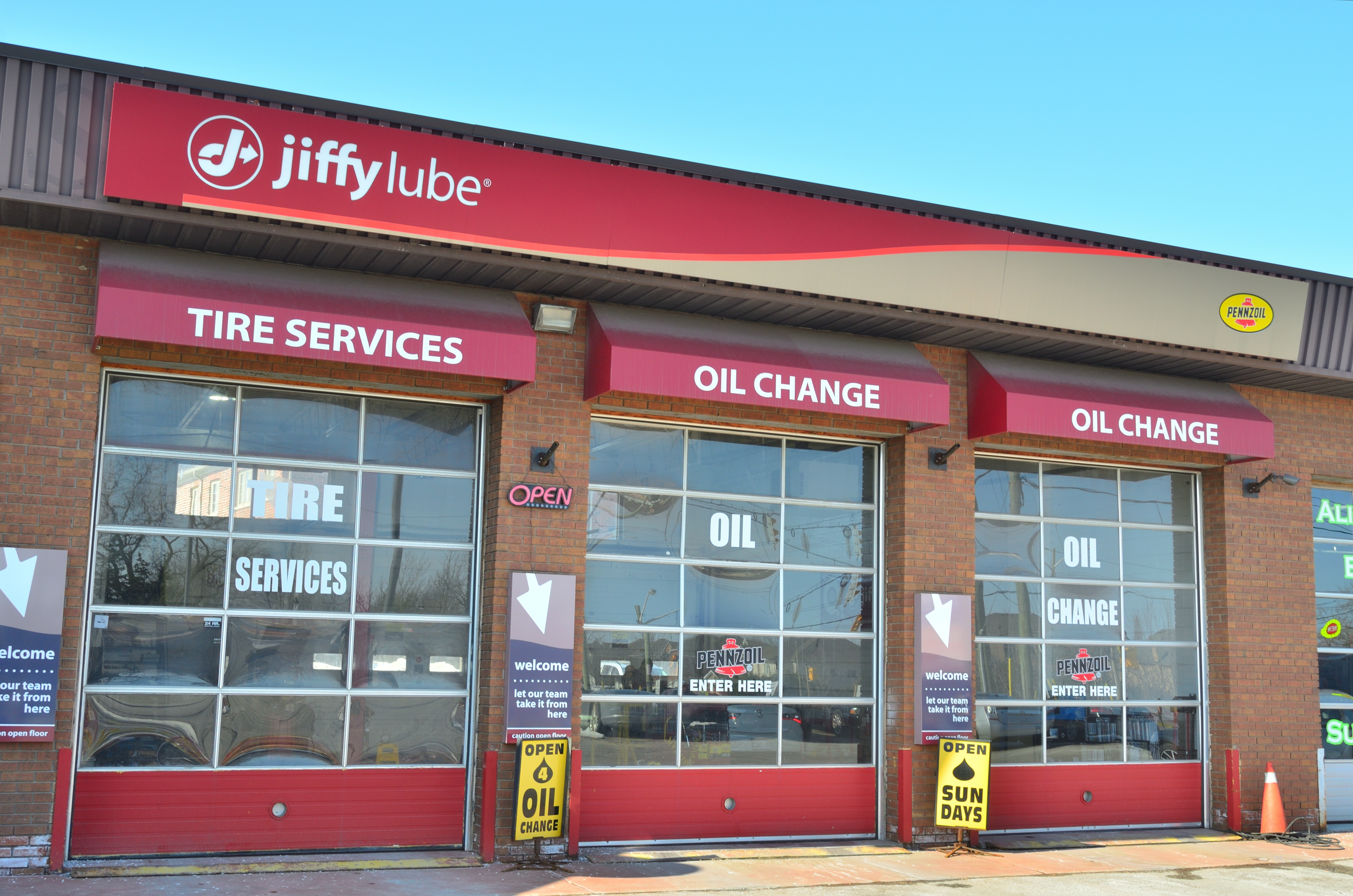
- A Jiffy Lube store in Richmond Hill, Ontario
- Type: Subsidiary
- Industry: Automotive
- Founded: 1971; 55 years ago Ogden, Utah, U.S.
- Founder: Edwin H. Washburn
- Headquarters: Houston, Texas, U.S.
- Number of locations: 2,080 (2025)
- Key people: Edward Hymes, President
- Owner: Shell plc
- Parent: Shell US
- Website: www.jiffylube.com

Jiffy Lube International, Inc. is an American chain of automotive oil change specialty shops founded in Utah, United States, in 1971. It has been a subsidiary of Shell since 2002, and is headquartered in Houston, Texas.

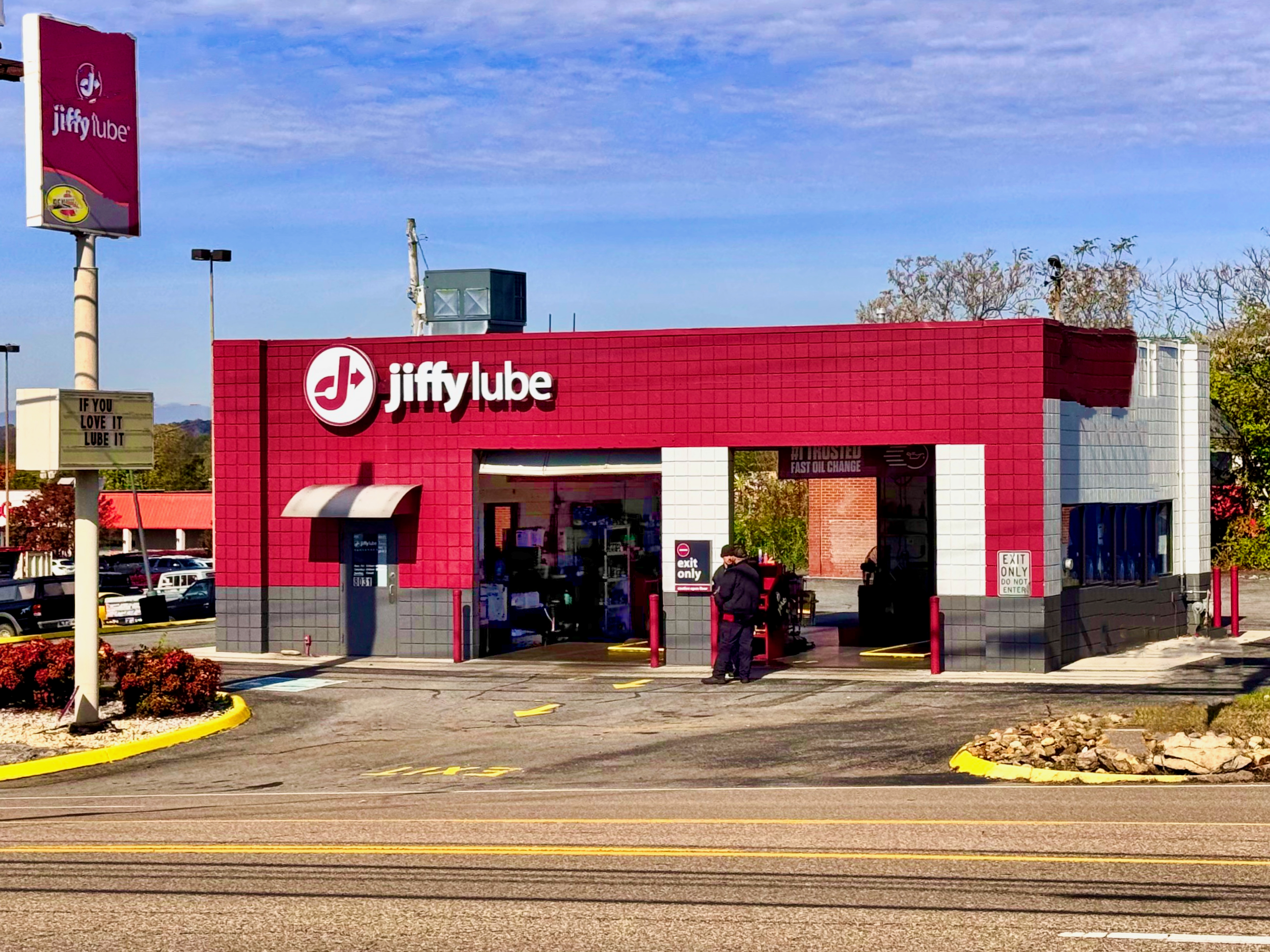
A modern Jiffy Lube in Knoxville, Tennessee

== Overview ==
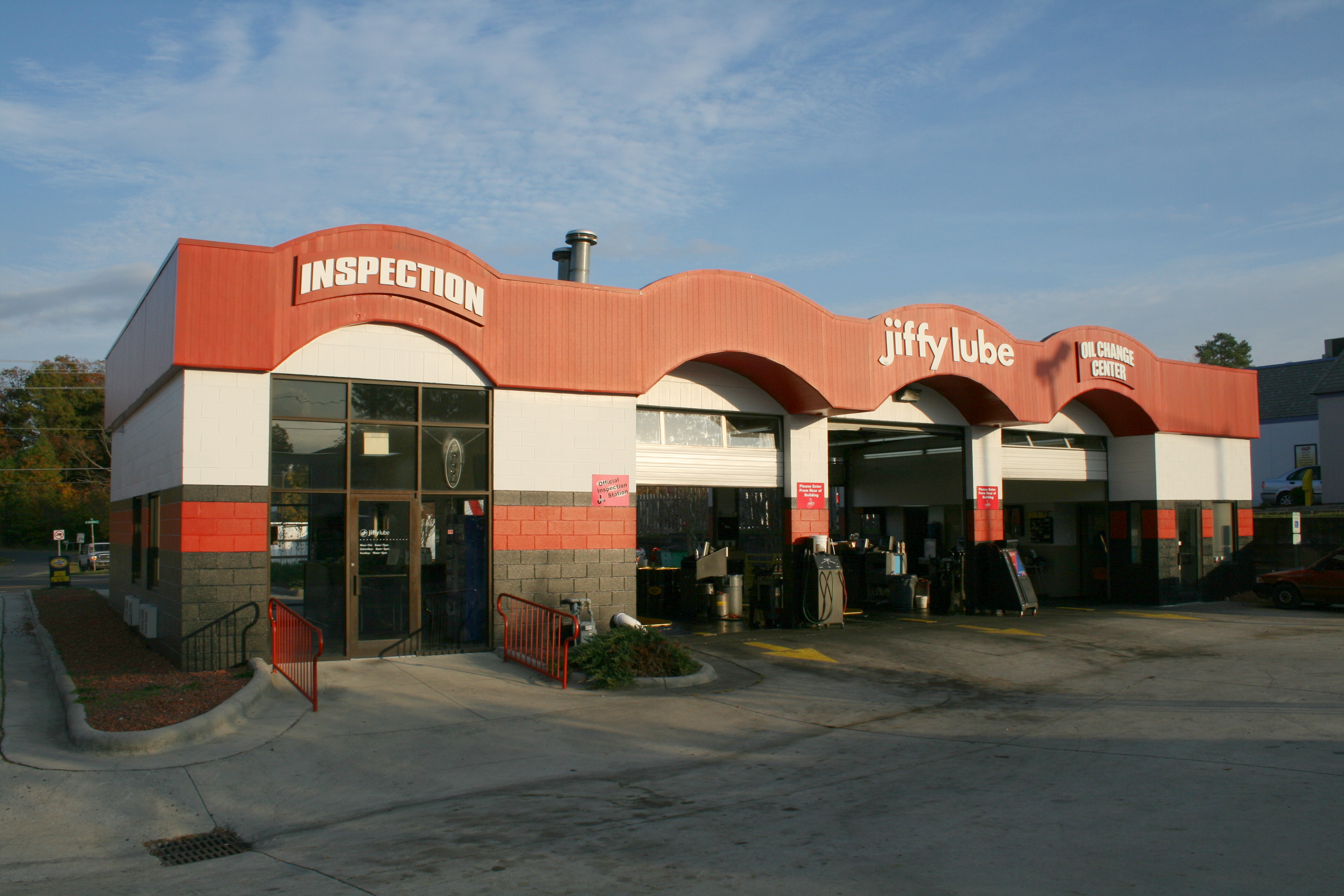
A Jiffy Lube in Durham, North Carolina

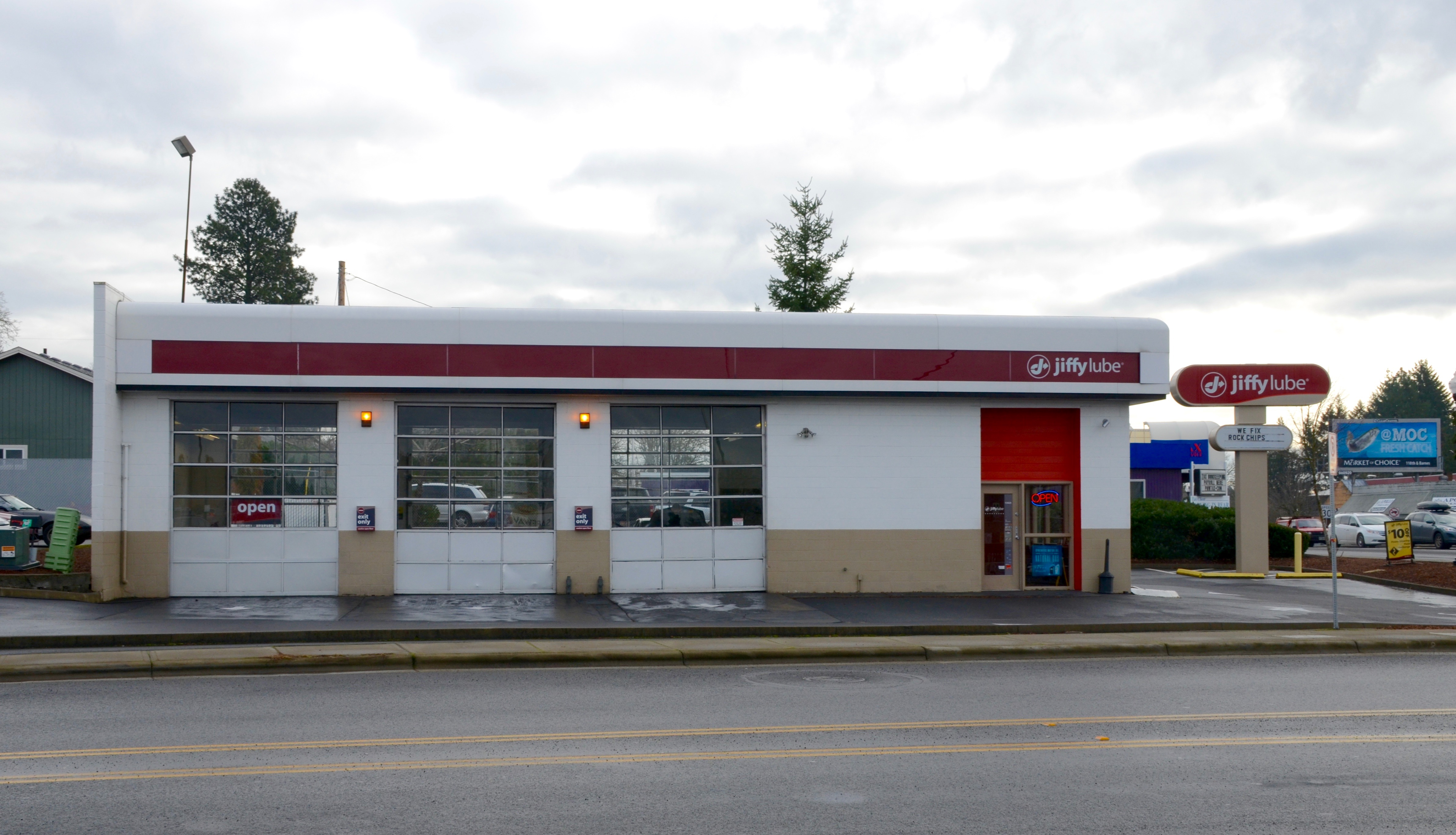
A Jiffy Lube in Cedar Mill, Oregon

There are about 2,000 Jiffy Lube franchises in North America, all of them independently owned by 252 operators, with about 24 million customers each year as of 2002. The company was ranked first on National Oil and Lube News 2011 Tops in the Fast Lubes Industry Rankings. Also, Jiffy Lube was ranked number 15 in Entrepreneur Magazine's 2012 Franchise 500 and number 73 on Franchise Times' 2011 Top 200 Franchise Chains by Worldwide Sales.

== History ==
The first Jiffy Lube store was established on 36th Street in Ogden, Utah, by Edwin H. Washburn as early as 1971. Over the following years, Washburn franchised a number of Jiffy Lube stores within Utah. In 1979, W. James Hindman, a football coach at Western Maryland College, bought out Washburn's seven franchises and established Jiffy Lube International, relocating the headquarters to Baltimore, Maryland. It is this year which Jiffy Lube generally states as its founding date with Hindman as its founder.

Jiffy Lube went public in 1987, and had opened over 1,019 franchises and company stores by 1989. In 1991, it became a subsidiary of Pennzoil.

Following the merger of Pennzoil and Quaker State in 1998, the 581 Q Lube stores were merged into the Jiffy Lube brand, then possessing 1,541 stores, with overlapping operations being closed down. Pennzoil-Quaker State was ultimately purchased by Shell Oil Company in 2002.

Jiffy Lube's North American footprint peaked at more than 2,200 service centers in 2007, when the chain served approximately 27.5 million customers annually and ranked first in National Oil & Lube News' industry survey. By 2020, the franchised network had contracted to 1,828 service centers that had been open for a full 12 months, according to the company's 2021 franchise disclosure document. As of March 2026, there were 2,076 Jiffy Lube locations in the United States.

In March 2026, Shell announced that it would sell Jiffy Lube to Monomoy Capital Partners for $1.3 billion.

== Services ==
In June 2011, Jiffy Lube introduced a new program called Oil Change Schedule (OCS). The new program allows Jiffy Lube customers to choose how often they have their oil changed based on a number of variables including vehicle manufacturer recommendations, driving habits, and road conditions. The OCS program moves away from the old model of changing oil every 3,000 miles and provides a schedule that is unique for each driver.

== Controversy ==
In 2003, Jiffy Lube was the focus of a KNBC investigative report that alleged that Jiffy Lube was charging customers for services not performed. During the investigation, five out of nine Jiffy Lube locations charged undercover reporters for work that was not performed. After the investigation aired, Jiffy Lube claimed to perform sweeping changes to their training program to prevent this, though among the training tactics, was having workers recognize the tactics of an investigative reporter and evade further scrutiny. At the end of the investigation, Jiffy Lube installed cameras in their stores to allow customers to observe repairs.

In 2009, Jiffy Lube was found to be performing repair procedures on vehicles that were recommended against by the manufacturer due to the potential to cause engine damage. These procedures included engine flushes and fuel injection cleaning which can cause engine and fuel injection problems.

In May 2013, Los Angeles Jiffy Lube locations were again the subject of a KNBC investigation. The station reported that not only had fraudulent practices again been detected at the majority of investigated Southern California Jiffy Lube stores, but the current fraud was worse than that found in the original investigation.
