= Renée Sonnenberg =

Canadian curler

- Curler
- Born: Renée Handfield; March 22, 1971 (age 55); Edmonton, Alberta, Canada

Curling career
- Hearts: 4 (1999, 2001, 2013, 2014)
- Top CTRS ranking: 8th (2005-06, 2013-14)
- Grand Slam victories: 1 Manitoba Lotteries: (2011)
Medal record
Women's Curling
Representing Alberta
Scotties Tournament of Hearts
Silver medal – second place	2014 Montreal

Renée Sonnenberg (born Renée Handfield March 22, 1971) is a Canadian curler from Grande Prairie, Alberta.

== Curling career ==
Sonnenberg had a fairly successful junior career, having won two provincial junior titles in 1989 and 1990. She placed third at the 1989 Canadian Junior Curling Championships. At the 1990 Canadian Junior Curling Championships, her team finished 4–6, out of the playoffs.

In 2001, Sonnenberg won the provincial mixed title, playing third for Kurt Balderston. They finished the round robin tied for first with another six teams at a 7–4 record. They lost to Saskatchewan in their first tie breaker match, eliminating them.

Sonnenberg has won two provincial titles, in 1999 and 2001. At the 1999 Scott Tournament of Hearts, she finished 5–6, out of the playoffs. At the 2001 Scott Tournament of Hearts, she finished 4–7, missing the playoffs again. Sonnenberg was asked to be the alternate player for Team Alberta (skipped by Kristie Moore) at the 2013 Scotties Tournament of Hearts, following losing to Moore in the final of the 2013 Alberta Scotties Tournament of Hearts. In 2014, she was also asked to be the alternate player, this time for the Valerie Sweeting team.

At the 2010 Winter Olympics, Sonnenberg coached the Danish national team.

Sonnenberg and her team qualified to play in her first Olympic Trials by qualifying out of the 2013 Olympic Pre-Trials tournament, giving her the right to play in the 2013 Canadian Olympic Curling Trials.

Sonnenberg was named as part of the Curling Canada High Performance staff, acting as the Performance Consultant & Analytics Lead for the 2018-19 National Team Program.

== Personal life ==
Sonnenberg has a husband and a son, and is employed as a teacher with the Grande Prairie & District Catholic Schools. She currently is running the Grande Prairie, Alberta KUMON Learning Centre.

== Grand Slam record ==
Sonnenberg's only Grand Slam victory came at the 2011 Manitoba Lotteries Women's Curling Classic.

Key
C	Champion
F	Lost in Final
SF	Lost in Semifinal
QF	Lost in Quarterfinals
R16	Lost in the round of 16
Q	Did not advance to playoffs
T2	Played in Tier 2 event
DNP	Did not participate in event
N/A	Not a Grand Slam event that season

Event	2005–06	2006–07	2007–08	2008–09	2009–10	2010–11	2011–12	2012–13	2013–14
Players'	QF	DNP	DNP	QF	DNP	DNP	DNP	QF	DNP

=== Former events ===
Event	2006–07	2007–08	2008–09	2009–10	2010–11	2011–12	2012–13	2013–14
Autumn Gold	Q	Q	Q	DNP	Q	Q	Q	Q
Manitoba Liquor & Lotteries	Q	Q	Q	DNP	QF	C	QF	Q
Colonial Square	N/A	N/A	N/A	N/A	N/A	N/A	Q	SF
Wayden Transportation	Q	Q	Q	N/A	N/A	N/A	N/A	N/A
