= Tiffany Steuber =

Canadian curler

- Curler
- Born: Tiffany McKeeman; July 17, 1977 (age 49); Grande Prairie, Alberta, Canada

Team
- Curling club: Thistle CC, Edmonton, AB
- Skip: Tiffany Steuber
- Third: Brittany Martin
- Second: Lisa Miller
- Lead: Cindy Westgard

Tiffany Steuber (born July 17, 1977, in Grande Prairie, Alberta as Tiffany McKeeman) is a Canadian curler from Parkland County.

Steuber's first World Curling Tour event came in 2008 at the Red Deer Curling Classic. Steuber skipped her own team that season before moving to play third for Karallee Swabb in 2009. She would only play in one event that season before forming her own team again in 2010.

Steuber won her first Tour event at the 2012 Spruce Grove Cashspiel over Holly Whyte. After skipping for three seasons, Steuber dissolved her team and joined with Kaufman in 2013. As a member of the Kaufman rink, Steuber won the 2013 Avonair Cash Spiel.

Steuber participated in her first national championship in 2024, skipping the Alberta team at the 2024 Canadian Curling Club Championships.
