= Lisa Eyamie =

Canadian curler

- Curler
- Born: Lisa Fargey; April 10, 1977 (age 49); Winnipeg, Manitoba, Canada

Team
- Curling club: Okotoks CC, Okotoks, AB

Curling career
- Hearts: 1 (2017)
- Top CTRS ranking: 9th (2008–09)

Lisa Eyamie (born April 10, 1977 in Winnipeg, Manitoba as Lisa Fargey) is a Canadian curler from Calgary, Alberta.

== Career ==
Eyamie was a top junior curler in her native province of Manitoba. She played in six provincial junior championships and in five provincial mixed championships. In addition to that, Eyamie has curled in 4 Manitoba Scotties Tournament of Hearts and 3 Alberta Scotties Tournament of Hearts winning the 2017 Alberta Scotties Tournament of Hearts.

Eyamie left Manitoba in 2008 to play third for Heather Rankin's Calgary rink. The team qualified for the 2009 Olympic Pre-Trials finishing with a 1-3 record.

Eyamie left the Rankin rink in 2010 to skip her own team. In 2016 Eyamie joined Shannon Kliebrink's team In 2017 they won the 2017 Alberta Scotties Tournament of Hearts and went on to represent Alberta at the 2017 Scotties Tournament of Hearts. They finished 5-6.

== Personal life ==
Eyamie attended high school at Collège Louis-Riel and is a graduate of the University of Manitoba, where she took management. After growing up in Winnipeg, she moved to the United States in the mid-2000s before settling in Calgary in 2008. She works as a director for Long View Systems. She is married and has two children.
