= Jessica Amundson =

Canadian curler

- Curler
- Born: Jessica Mair; May 14, 1984 (age 42); Edmonton, Alberta, Canada

Curling career
- Hearts: 2 (2012, 2013)
- World Championship: 1 (2012)
Medal record
Curling
Representing Canada
World Championships
Bronze medal – third place	2012 Lethbridge
Representing Alberta
Scotties Tournament of Hearts
Gold medal – first place	2012 Red Deer

Jessica Amundson (born May 14, 1984 as Jessica Mair) is a Canadian curler. She played second for the 2012 national champion Heather Nedohin rink.

Before joining the Nedohin rink, Amundson was a top collegiate curler. In 2005, she won the Alberta collegiate championship. She also represented the University of Alberta at the 2010 CIS/CCA Curling Championships, where her rink lost to the University of Waterloo in a tie-breaker.

In 2009, Amundson joined the Nedohin rink. The team won their first national championship in 2012, at the 2012 Scotties Tournament of Hearts.

She has not curled competitively since 2014.

== Personal ==
Amundson is a grade six teacher in Beaumont, Alberta.
