= Stephanie Enright (curler) =

Canadian curler

- Curler
- Born: Stephanie Walker; Beaverlodge, Alberta

Team
- Skip: Nicky Kaufman
- Third: Pamela Appelman
- Second: Kimberly Curtin
- Lead: Stephanie Enright

Curling career
- Member Association: Alberta
- Top CTRS ranking: 5th (2016–17)
- Grand Slam victories: 1 (2017 Canadian Open)

Stephanie Enright (born Stephanie Walker) is a Canadian curler from Rosalind, Alberta. She represented the University of Alberta at the University Nationals twice, and in 2017 she was part of the team which won the Canadian Open as a member of Team Casey Scheidegger.

Enright's brother, Geoff Walker, is also a curler and was World Champion in 2017. She is married to fellow curler and 2010 Olympic gold medallist Adam Enright.
