= Lethbridge Curling Club =

Curling Club in Canada

The Lethbridge Curling Club is an historic curling club located in Lethbridge, Alberta.

The club is one of the oldest in Alberta, being founded in 1887. Back then, the club played on ponds and sloughs. A two-sheet club was set up in 1895 in the area of 4th St. and 1st Ave S. Until 1904, the club was affiliated with the Manitoba branch of the Royal Caledonian Curling Club. Alberta was not yet a province at the time. In 1910, the club was expanded to four sheets and moved to the corner of 13th St. and 4th Ave. S. The Club moved to The Civic Ice Centre, which is home to the Lethbridge Figure Skating Club in 1950 where it operated until moving to its new home in 2016. The club currently resides at the ATB Centre at 74 Mauretania Road West and has 10 sheets, among the largest in Canada. The club is home to three provincial women's teams, one of which won the Canadian championship. Myrna McQuarrie's rink won the provincial and Canadian national championship in 1977. She won another provincial title in 1979. Barbara Davis won the provincial championship in 1980. Skip Nanette Dupont won the 2010 Dominion Curling Club Championships for the club. Dupont won again at the 2019 Canadian Curling Club Championships. The club is also home to the 2008 World Senior Curling Championships winning team.

The club hosted the 2017 World Mixed Doubles Curling Championship and 2017 World Senior Curling Championships.

== Notable members ==
- Casey Scheidegger Grand Slam Champion
- Jessie Haughian Grand Slam Champion
- Nanette Dupont Dominion Club Champion
