= Saville Community Sports Centre =

Sports facility in Edmonton, Alberta

Coordinates: 53.5022°N 113.5322°W

- Interactive map of Saville Community Sports Centre
- Location: 11520 65 Avenue; Edmonton, Alberta T6G 2E1
- Public transit: South Campus/Fort Edmonton Park station

Construction
- Opened: 2003

The Saville Community Sports Centre is a sports facility operated by the University of Alberta's Faculty of Physical Education and Recreation in Edmonton, Alberta . It features a curling rink, tennis courts and a gymnasium.

Opened in 2003, the centre currently serves as the national training centre for curling in Canada. Its curling facilities include ten sheets, and is home to a membership of nearly 2000 curlers, making it the curling club with the largest membership list in the world.

The club is home to many of the top curling teams and athletes in the world, including Olympic gold medallist Kevin Martin, Brier champions Kevin Koe, Randy Ferbey, and Ted Appelman, as well as Scotties champions Cathy King, Heather Nedohin and Val Sweeting. Saville is also the home of the University of Alberta Golden Bears and Pandas curling teams.

A West Wing, added in 2011, is Canada's largest hardwood installation, and also the home of the University of Alberta Golden Bears and Pandas basketball and volleyball teams.

Saville hosted the 2015 FIBA Americas Women's Championship.

The centre is also home to eight indoor tennis courts and nine outdoor courts, a fitness centre, a 9000 sq. ft. gym, and "Kevin's Rocks-N-Racquets" Pro Shop, run by Kevin Martin himself.

The Saville Community Sports Centre was named for Bruce Saville, a businessman and philanthropist in Edmonton.
