= 2007 Sobeys Slam =

Grand Slam of Curling event

- Host city: New Glasgow, Nova Scotia
- Arena: John Brother MacDonald Stadium
- Dates: November 29 – December 2
- Winner: (Ontario) Team Middaugh
- Curling club: Coldwater & District Curling Club; Coldwater, Ontario
- Skip: Sherry Middaugh
- Third: Kirsten Wall
- Second: Kim Moore
- Lead: Aldra Harmark
- Finalist: (Quebec) Marie-France Larouche

The 2007 Sobeys Slam was held from November 29 to December 2 at the John Brother MacDonald Stadium in New Glasgow, Nova Scotia. It was the fourth of five women's Grand Slam events during the 2007–08 season. It was the first season where the event was a Slam. The total purse was $54,000 with $14,000 going to the champion Sherry Middaugh rink.

Sherry Middaugh won her first Grand Slam event by defeating Marie-France Larouche 6–4 in the final. Middaugh lost her first two games before racking off seven straight wins to claim the title. Larouche went undefeated up until the final before losing to Middaugh.

== Teams ==
The teams are listed as follows:

Skip	Third	Second	Lead	Locale
Sherry Anderson	Kim Hodson	Heather Walsh	Donna Gignac	Saskatoon, Saskatchewan
Mary-Anne Arsenault	Kim Kelly	Laine Peters	Nancy Delahunt	Halifax, Nova Scotia
Ève Bélisle	Brenda Nicholls	Martine Comeau	Julie Rainville	Montreal, Quebec
Cheryl Bernard	Susan O'Connor	Carolyn McRorie	Cori Morris	Calgary, Alberta
Suzanne Birt	Robyn Green	Carol Whitaker	Stefanie Clark	Charlottetown, Prince Edward Island
Shelly Bradley	Tammy Lowther	Janice McCallum	Tricia Affleck	Charlottetown, Prince Edward Island
Marie Christianson	Katie Thomas	Liz Woodworth	Jenn Baxter	Charlottetown, Prince Edward Island
Sandy Comeau	Denise Nowlan	Stacey Leger	Heather Munn	Moncton, New Brunswick
Suzanne Frick	Heather Carr Olmstead	Christine Loube	Heather Zucker	Guelph, Ontario
Cathy Auld (Fourth)	Leslie Bishop	Melissa Foster	Alison Goring	Thornhill, Ontario
Meredith Harrison	Jill Brothers	Kristen MacDiarmid	Teri Lake	Halifax, Nova Scotia
Amber Holland	Kim Schneider	Tammy Schneider	Heather Kalenchuk	Kronau, Saskatchewan
Jolene McIvor	Sherry Linton	Allison Slupski	Marcia Gudereit	Regina, Saskatchewan
Colleen Jones	Georgina Wheatcroft	Kate Hamer	Darah Blandford	Halifax, Nova Scotia
Jennifer Jones	Cathy Overton-Clapham	Jill Officer	Dawn Askin	Winnipeg, Manitoba
Andrea Kelly	Melissa Adams	Jodie deSolla	Lianne Sobey	Fredericton, New Brunswick
Cathy King	Lori Olson	Raylene Rocque	Tracy Bush	Edmonton, Alberta
Shannon Kleibrink	Amy Nixon	Bronwen Webster	Chelsey Matson	Calgary, Alberta
Patti Lank	Erika Brown	Caitlin Maroldo	Chrissy Haase	New York, United States
Marie-France Larouche	Nancy Bélanger	Annie Lemay	Joëlle Sabourin	Quebec, Quebec
Stefanie Lawton	Marliese Kasner	Sherri Singler	Lana Vey	Saskatoon, Saskatchewan
Colleen Madonia	Karri-Lee Grant	Janet Murphy	Moira Klein-Swormink	Mississauga, Ontario
Kristy McDonald	Lisa Blixhavn	Leslie Wilson	Raunora Westcott	Winnipeg, Manitoba
Janet McGhee	Sara Garland	Susan Froud	Candace Coe	Uxbridge, Ontario
Sherry Middaugh	Kirsten Wall	Kim Moore	Andra Harmark	Coldwater, Ontario
Heather Nedohin (Fourth)	Kristie Moore (Skip)	Beth Iskiw	Pam Appelman	Edmonton, Alberta
Cassie Potter	Jamie Haskell	Jessica Schultz	Maureen Brunt	St. Paul / Minneapolis, United States
Heather Rankin	Deanna Doig	Heather Jensen	Kyla MacLachlan	Calgary, Alberta
Julie Reddick	Jo-Ann Rizzo	Leigh Armstrong	Stephanie Korab	Brantford, Ontario
Sarah Rhyno	Jenn Brine	Jessica Bradford	Heather Ross	Brookside, Nova Scotia
Heather Strong	Cathy Cunningham	Laura Strong	Peg Ross	St. John's, Newfoundland and Labrador
Crystal Webster	Desiree Owen	Samantha Preston	Stephanie Malekoff	Grand Prairie, Alberta

== Knockout brackets ==
=== A Event ===
First Knockout
(Saskatchewan) Sherry Anderson	10
(Ontario) Suzanne Frick	0
(Ontario) Julie Reddick	7
(Nova Scotia) Meredith Harrison	5
(Alberta) Crystal Webster	5
(Ontario) Alison Goring	8
(Prince Edward Island) Suzanne Birt	3
(Nova Scotia) Mary-Anne Arsenault	6
(Alberta) Cheryl Bernard	5
(Prince Edward Island) Shelly Bradley	4
(United States) Cassie Potter	6
(Prince Edward Island) Marie Christianson	7
(Saskatchewan) Stefanie Lawton	7
(Ontario) Janet McGhee	2
(Ontario) Colleen Madonia	5
(New Brunswick) Andrea Kelly	8

Quarterfinals
(Saskatchewan) Sherry Anderson	0
(Ontario) Julie Reddick	6
(Ontario) Alison Goring	4
(Nova Scotia) Mary-Anne Arsenault	6
(Alberta) Cheryl Bernard	6
(Prince Edward Island) Marie Christianson	3
(Saskatchewan) Stefanie Lawton	4
(New Brunswick) Andrea Kelly	6

Semifinals
(Ontario) Julie Reddick	3
(Nova Scotia) Mary-Anne Arsenault	5
(Alberta) Cheryl Bernard	7
(New Brunswick) Andrea Kelly	8

Qualifier 1
(Nova Scotia) Mary-Anne Arsenault	5
(New Brunswick) Andrea Kelly	6

First Knockout
(Manitoba) Jennifer Jones	9
(Nova Scotia) Sarah Rhyno	3
(Newfoundland and Labrador) Heather Strong	3
(United States) Patti Lank	7
(Ontario) Sherry Middaugh	3
(Saskatchewan) Jolene McIvor	5
(Nova Scotia) Colleen Jones	3
(Quebec) Ève Bélisle	5
(Alberta) Shannon Kleibrink	4
(Quebec) Marie-France Larouche	7
(Alberta) Kristie Moore	5
(Saskatchewan) Amber Holland	6
(Alberta) Cathy King	4
(New Brunswick) Sandy Comeau	8
(Alberta) Heather Rankin	10
(Manitoba) Kristy McDonald	1

Quarterfinals
(Manitoba) Jennifer Jones	8
(United States) Patti Lank	2
(Saskatchewan) Jolene McIvor	6
(Quebec) Ève Bélisle	7
(Quebec) Marie-France Larouche	6
(Saskatchewan) Amber Holland	4
(New Brunswick) Sandy Comeau	2
(Alberta) Heather Rankin	11

Semifinals
(Manitoba) Jennifer Jones	5
(Quebec) Ève Bélisle	8
(Quebec) Marie-France Larouche	8
(Alberta) Heather Rankin	2

Qualifier 2
(Quebec) Ève Bélisle	3
(Quebec) Marie-France Larouche	7

=== B Event ===
Second Knockout
(Ontario) Suzanne Frick	5
(Nova Scotia) Meredith Harrison	4
(Prince Edward Island) Suzanne Birt	9
(Alberta) Crystal Webster	2

Quarterfinals
(Prince Edward Island) Marie Christianson	5
(Ontario) Suzanne Frick	3
(Saskatchewan) Stefanie Lawton	6
(Prince Edward Island) Suzanne Birt	5

Semifinals
(Prince Edward Island) Marie Christianson	2
(Manitoba) Jennifer Jones	9
(Saskatchewan) Stefanie Lawton	7
(Alberta) Heather Rankin	6

To Qualifier 3
(Manitoba) Jennifer Jones	6
(Saskatchewan) Stefanie Lawton	7
Qualifier 3
(Saskatchewan) Stefanie Lawton	5
(Ontario) Alison Goring	4

Second Knockout
(Prince Edward Island) Shelly Bradley	8
(United States) Cassie Potter	1
(Ontario) Janet McGhee	6
(Ontario) Colleen Madonia	1

Quarterfinals
(Saskatchewan) Sherry Anderson	5
(Prince Edward Island) Shelly Bradley	6
(Ontario) Alison Goring	5
(Ontario) Janet McGhee	4

Semifinals
(Prince Edward Island) Shelly Bradley	2
(Ontario) Alison Goring	5

To Qualifier 3
(Ontario) Alison Goring	9
(Nova Scotia) Mary-Anne Arsenault	3

Second Knockout
(Nova Scotia) Sarah Rhyno	5
(Newfoundland and Labrador) Heather Strong	6
(Ontario) Sherry Middaugh	6
(Nova Scotia) Colleen Jones	7

Quarterfinals
(Saskatchewan) Amber Holland	4
(Newfoundland and Labrador) Heather Strong	6
(New Brunswick) Sandy Comeau	3
(Nova Scotia) Colleen Jones	4

Semifinals
(Newfoundland and Labrador) Heather Strong	5
(Alberta) Cheryl Bernard	4
(Nova Scotia) Colleen Jones	4
(Ontario) Julie Reddick	2

To Qualifier 4
(Newfoundland and Labrador) Heather Strong	5
(Nova Scotia) Colleen Jones	6
Qualifier 4
(Nova Scotia) Colleen Jones	1
(Alberta) Shannon Kleibrink	3

Second Knockout
(Alberta) Shannon Kleibrink	8
(Alberta) Kristie Moore	2
(Alberta) Cathy King	1
(Manitoba) Kristy McDonald	7

Quarterfinals
(United States) Patti Lank	2
(Alberta) Shannon Kleibrink	6
(Saskatchewan) Jolene McIvor	7
(Manitoba) Kristy McDonald	6

Semifinals
(Alberta) Shannon Kleibrink	5
(Saskatchewan) Jolene McIvor	2

To Qualifier 4
(Alberta) Shannon Kleibrink	5
(Quebec) Ève Bélisle	4

=== C Event ===
Third Knockout
(Ontario) Suzanne Frick	4
(Prince Edward Island) Suzanne Birt	5

Quarterfinals
(Prince Edward Island) Shelly Bradley	1
(Prince Edward Island) Suzanne Birt	10
(Prince Edward Island) Marie Christianson	4
(Alberta) Heather Rankin	8

Semifinals
(Prince Edward Island) Suzanne Birt	9
(Alberta) Heather Rankin	3

Qualifier 5
(Prince Edward Island) Suzanne Birt	6
(Nova Scotia) Colleen Jones	3

Third Knockout
(Nova Scotia) Meredith Harrison	6
(Alberta) Crystal Webster	5
(United States) Cassie Potter	3
(Ontario) Colleen Madonia	9

Quarterfinals
(Saskatchewan) Sherry Anderson	7
(Ontario) Janet McGhee	8
(Nova Scotia) Meredith Harrison	8
(Ontario) Colleen Madonia	6

Semifinals
(Ontario) Janet McGhee	5
(Newfoundland and Labrador) Heather Strong	8
(Nova Scotia) Meredith Harrison	8
(Nova Scotia) Mary-Anne Arsenault	6

Qualifier 6
(Newfoundland and Labrador) Heather Strong	2
(Nova Scotia) Meredith Harrison	8

Third Knockout
(Nova Scotia) Sarah Rhyno	4
(Ontario) Sherry Middaugh	6
(Alberta) Kristie Moore	9
(Alberta) Cathy King	2

Quarterfinals
(Ontario) Sherry Middaugh	7
(Alberta) Kristie Moore	4
(United States) Patti Lank	7
(Manitoba) Kristy McDonald	5

Semifinals
(Ontario) Sherry Middaugh	5
(Quebec) Ève Bélisle	4
(United States) Patti Lank	1
(Manitoba) Jennifer Jones	8

Qualifier 7
(Ontario) Sherry Middaugh	6
(Manitoba) Jennifer Jones	5

Third Knockout
(Saskatchewan) Amber Holland	7
(New Brunswick) Sandy Comeau	6

Quarterfinals
(Saskatchewan) Jolene McIvor	7
(Saskatchewan) Amber Holland	6
(Alberta) Cheryl Bernard	8
(Ontario) Julie Reddick	5

Semifinals
(Saskatchewan) Jolene McIvor	10
(Alberta) Cheryl Bernard	8

Qualifier 8
(Saskatchewan) Jolene McIvor	2
(Ontario) Alison Goring	7

== Knockout results ==
All draw times listed in Atlantic Time (UTC−03:00).

=== Draw 1 ===
Thursday, November 29, 8:30 am

Sheet 1	1	2	3	4	5	6	7	8	9	Final
(United States) Cassie Potter 🔨	0	0	1	0	2	0	3	0	0	6
(Prince Edward Island) Marie Christianson	0	1	0	1	0	1	0	3	1	7

Sheet 2	1	2	3	4	5	6	7	8	Final
(Alberta) Cheryl Bernard 🔨	0	1	1	0	3	0	0	0	5
(Prince Edward Island) Shelly Bradley	0	0	0	1	0	2	0	1	4

Sheet 3	1	2	3	4	5	6	7	8	Final
(Ontario) Colleen Madonia 🔨	2	0	1	0	1	1	0	X	5
(New Brunswick) Andrea Kelly	0	1	0	3	0	0	4	X	8

Sheet 4	1	2	3	4	5	6	7	8	Final
(Saskatchewan) Stefanie Lawton	0	2	1	4	0	X	X	X	7
(Ontario) Janet McGhee 🔨	1	0	0	0	1	X	X	X	2

Sheet 5	1	2	3	4	5	6	7	8	Final
(Ontario) Julie Reddick	0	0	3	0	1	2	0	1	7
(Nova Scotia) Meredith Harrison 🔨	0	2	0	2	0	0	1	0	5

Sheet 6	1	2	3	4	5	6	7	8	Final
(Saskatchewan) Sherry Anderson 🔨	2	1	1	4	2	X	X	X	10
(Ontario) Suzanne Frick	0	0	0	0	0	X	X	X	0

Sheet 7	1	2	3	4	5	6	7	8	Final
(Prince Edward Island) Suzanne Birt	0	0	1	0	1	0	1	0	3
(Nova Scotia) Mary-Anne Arsenault 🔨	1	1	0	1	0	2	0	1	6

Sheet 8	1	2	3	4	5	6	7	8	Final
(Alberta) Crystal Webster 🔨	2	0	1	0	0	0	2	X	5
(Ontario) Alison Goring	0	4	0	2	1	1	0	X	8

=== Draw 2 ===
Thursday, November 29, 12:00 pm

Sheet 1	1	2	3	4	5	6	7	8	Final
(Alberta) Kristie Moore	0	2	0	1	0	2	0	0	5
(Saskatchewan) Amber Holland 🔨	2	0	2	0	1	0	0	1	6

Sheet 2	1	2	3	4	5	6	7	8	Final
(Alberta) Shannon Kleibrink	0	1	0	0	1	0	2	0	4
(Quebec) Marie-France Larouche 🔨	0	0	2	3	0	1	0	1	7

Sheet 3	1	2	3	4	5	6	7	8	Final
(Alberta) Heather Rankin	4	2	0	1	1	2	X	X	10
(Manitoba) Kristy McDonald 🔨	0	0	1	0	0	0	X	X	1

Sheet 4	1	2	3	4	5	6	7	8	Final
(Alberta) Cathy King	0	0	0	4	0	0	0	X	4
(New Brunswick) Sandy Comeau 🔨	2	1	1	0	2	1	1	X	8

Sheet 5	1	2	3	4	5	6	7	8	Final
(Newfoundland and Labrador) Heather Strong 🔨	0	1	0	1	0	1	0	0	3
(United States) Patti Lank	1	0	2	0	1	0	2	1	7

Sheet 6	1	2	3	4	5	6	7	8	Final
(Manitoba) Jennifer Jones	0	3	1	2	0	2	1	X	9
(Nova Scotia) Sarah Rhyno 🔨	1	0	0	0	2	0	0	X	3

Sheet 7	1	2	3	4	5	6	7	8	Final
(Nova Scotia) Colleen Jones 🔨	1	0	1	0	0	0	1	0	3
(Quebec) Ève Bélisle	0	1	0	0	2	1	0	1	5

Sheet 8	1	2	3	4	5	6	7	8	Final
(Ontario) Sherry Middaugh 🔨	1	0	1	0	1	0	0	X	3
(Saskatchewan) Jolene McIvor	0	1	0	4	0	0	0	X	5

=== Draw 3 ===
Thursday, November 29, 4:00 pm

Sheet 1	1	2	3	4	5	6	7	8	Final
(Saskatchewan) Sherry Anderson 🔨	0	0	0	0	0	0	X	X	0
(Ontario) Julie Reddick	1	0	2	1	1	1	X	X	6

Sheet 2	1	2	3	4	5	6	7	8	Final
(Ontario) Alison Goring	0	2	0	1	0	0	1	0	4
(Nova Scotia) Mary-Anne Arsenault 🔨	1	0	1	0	1	2	0	1	6

Sheet 3	1	2	3	4	5	6	7	8	Final
(Ontario) Suzanne Frick	2	0	0	1	1	0	0	1	5
(Nova Scotia) Meredith Harrison 🔨	0	0	1	0	0	1	2	0	4

Sheet 4	1	2	3	4	5	6	7	8	Final
(Prince Edward Island) Suzanne Birt 🔨	2	0	2	2	0	3	X	X	9
(Alberta) Crystal Webster	0	1	0	0	1	0	X	X	2

Sheet 5	1	2	3	4	5	6	7	8	Final
(Prince Edward Island) Shelly Bradley 🔨	3	1	0	1	3	X	X	X	8
(United States) Cassie Potter	0	0	1	0	0	X	X	X	1

Sheet 6	1	2	3	4	5	6	7	8	Final
(Ontario) Janet McGhee	1	1	2	2	0	0	X	X	6
(Ontario) Colleen Madonia 🔨	0	0	0	0	0	1	X	X	1

Sheet 7	1	2	3	4	5	6	7	8	Final
(Alberta) Cheryl Bernard	0	2	0	1	1	0	2	X	6
(Prince Edward Island) Marie Christianson 🔨	1	0	1	0	0	1	0	X	3

Sheet 8	1	2	3	4	5	6	7	8	Final
(Saskatchewan) Stefanie Lawton	2	0	2	0	0	0	0	0	4
(New Brunswick) Andrea Kelly 🔨	0	1	0	1	0	1	2	1	6

=== Draw 4 ===
Thursday, November 29, 7:30 pm

Sheet 1	1	2	3	4	5	6	7	8	9	Final
(Nova Scotia) Sarah Rhyno 🔨	1	0	2	0	1	0	0	1	0	5
(Newfoundland and Labrador) Heather Strong	0	1	0	1	0	2	1	0	1	6

Sheet 2	1	2	3	4	5	6	7	8	Final
(Manitoba) Jennifer Jones 🔨	0	2	2	1	0	3	X	X	8
(United States) Patti Lank	1	0	0	0	1	0	X	X	2

Sheet 3	1	2	3	4	5	6	7	8	Final
(Saskatchewan) Jolene McIvor 🔨	3	0	1	0	1	0	1	0	6
(Quebec) Ève Bélisle	0	2	0	1	0	1	0	3	7

Sheet 4	1	2	3	4	5	6	7	8	Final
(Ontario) Sherry Middaugh	0	0	4	0	0	1	1	0	6
(Nova Scotia) Colleen Jones 🔨	1	2	0	1	2	0	0	1	7

Sheet 5	1	2	3	4	5	6	7	8	Final
(Alberta) Shannon Kleibrink	2	0	1	1	1	3	X	X	8
(Alberta) Kristie Moore 🔨	0	2	0	0	0	0	X	X	2

Sheet 6	1	2	3	4	5	6	7	8	Final
(Alberta) Cathy King 🔨	1	0	0	0	0	0	X	X	1
(Manitoba) Kristy McDonald	0	2	0	2	2	1	X	X	7

Sheet 7	1	2	3	4	5	6	7	8	Final
(Quebec) Marie-France Larouche 🔨	2	0	1	0	1	1	0	1	6
(Saskatchewan) Amber Holland	0	1	0	2	0	0	1	0	4

Sheet 8	1	2	3	4	5	6	7	8	Final
(New Brunswick) Sandy Comeau	0	1	0	0	1	0	X	X	2
(Alberta) Heather Rankin 🔨	3	0	2	2	0	4	X	X	11

=== Draw 5 ===
Friday, November 30, 8:30 am

Sheet 5	1	2	3	4	5	6	7	8	Final
(Ontario) Alison Goring 🔨	1	0	0	2	1	0	0	1	5
(Ontario) Janet McGhee	0	1	1	0	0	1	1	0	4

Sheet 6	1	2	3	4	5	6	7	8	Final
(Saskatchewan) Stefanie Lawton	0	1	0	0	2	0	2	1	6
(Prince Edward Island) Suzanne Birt 🔨	3	0	0	1	0	1	0	0	5

Sheet 7	1	2	3	4	5	6	7	8	9	Final
(Saskatchewan) Sherry Anderson	0	0	2	1	0	1	1	0	0	5
(Prince Edward Island) Shelly Bradley 🔨	2	1	0	0	1	0	0	1	1	6

Sheet 8	1	2	3	4	5	6	7	8	Final
(Prince Edward Island) Marie Christianson 🔨	1	0	0	1	0	2	0	1	5
(Ontario) Suzanne Frick	0	0	1	0	1	0	1	0	3

=== Draw 6 ===
Friday, November 30, 12:00 pm

Sheet 1	1	2	3	4	5	6	7	8	Final
(Manitoba) Jennifer Jones	0	2	0	0	2	0	1	0	5
(Quebec) Ève Bélisle 🔨	1	0	2	1	0	1	0	3	8

Sheet 2	1	2	3	4	5	6	7	8	Final
(Quebec) Marie-France Larouche 🔨	1	0	1	0	2	4	X	X	8
(Alberta) Heather Rankin	0	1	0	1	0	0	X	X	2

Sheet 3	1	2	3	4	5	6	7	8	Final
(Ontario) Julie Reddick	0	0	0	0	2	0	1	0	3
(Nova Scotia) Mary-Anne Arsenault 🔨	1	0	0	1	0	2	0	1	5

Sheet 4	1	2	3	4	5	6	7	8	Final
(Alberta) Cheryl Bernard 🔨	0	3	0	3	1	0	0	0	7
(New Brunswick) Andrea Kelly	1	0	2	0	0	2	1	2	8

Sheet 5	1	2	3	4	5	6	7	8	Final
(Saskatchewan) Jolene McIvor	0	0	2	1	0	1	1	2	7
(Manitoba) Kristy McDonald 🔨	3	1	0	0	2	0	0	0	6

Sheet 6	1	2	3	4	5	6	7	8	Final
(New Brunswick) Sandy Comeau 🔨	0	2	1	0	0	0	0	0	3
(Nova Scotia) Colleen Jones	0	0	0	2	0	1	1	0	4

Sheet 7	1	2	3	4	5	6	7	8	Final
(Saskatchewan) Amber Holland	0	2	1	0	0	1	0	0	4
(Newfoundland and Labrador) Heather Strong 🔨	0	0	0	3	0	0	2	1	6

Sheet 8	1	2	3	4	5	6	7	8	Final
(United States) Patti Lank	0	0	0	1	0	1	0	X	2
(Alberta) Shannon Kleibrink 🔨	0	3	1	0	1	0	1	X	6

=== Draw 7 ===
Friday, November 30, 4:00 pm

Sheet 1	1	2	3	4	5	6	7	8	Final
(United States) Cassie Potter 🔨	0	1	0	2	0	X	X	X	3
(Ontario) Colleen Madonia	1	0	4	0	4	X	X	X	9

Sheet 2	1	2	3	4	5	6	7	8	Final
(Prince Edward Island) Shelly Bradley 🔨	1	0	1	0	0	0	0	X	2
(Ontario) Alison Goring	0	2	0	0	1	1	1	X	5

Sheet 3	1	2	3	4	5	6	7	8	Final
(Alberta) Shannon Kleibrink 🔨	1	0	2	0	0	1	1	X	5
(Saskatchewan) Jolene McIvor	0	1	0	1	0	0	0	X	2

Sheet 4	1	2	3	4	5	6	7	8	9	Final
(Saskatchewan) Sherry Anderson	1	3	0	0	2	0	1	0	0	7
(Ontario) Janet McGhee 🔨	0	0	1	3	0	2	0	1	1	8

Sheet 5	1	2	3	4	5	6	7	8	9	Final
(Nova Scotia) Meredith Harrison 🔨	0	1	0	2	1	0	1	0	1	6
(Alberta) Crystal Webster	1	0	1	0	0	2	0	1	0	5

Sheet 6	1	2	3	4	5	6	7	8	Final
(Nova Scotia) Sarah Rhyno 🔨	1	0	1	1	0	1	0	X	4
(Ontario) Sherry Middaugh	0	2	0	0	4	0	0	X	6

Sheet 7	1	2	3	4	5	6	7	8	Final
(Ontario) Suzanne Frick	0	2	0	0	0	1	1	0	4
(Prince Edward Island) Suzanne Birt 🔨	1	0	0	1	2	0	0	1	5

Sheet 8	1	2	3	4	5	6	7	8	Final
(Alberta) Kristie Moore 🔨	1	0	2	1	1	0	4	X	9
(Alberta) Cathy King	0	1	0	0	0	1	0	X	2

=== Draw 8 ===
Friday, November 30, 7:30 pm

Sheet 1	1	2	3	4	5	6	7	8	Final
(Nova Scotia) Mary-Anne Arsenault	0	2	0	1	1	0	1	0	5
(New Brunswick) Andrea Kelly 🔨	1	0	1	0	0	3	0	1	6

Sheet 2	1	2	3	4	5	6	7	8	Final
(United States) Patti Lank	2	2	0	0	2	1	0	X	7
(Manitoba) Kristy McDonald 🔨	0	0	3	1	0	0	1	X	5

Sheet 3	1	2	3	4	5	6	7	8	Final
(Quebec) Ève Bélisle 🔨	1	0	0	0	0	2	0	X	3
(Quebec) Marie-France Larouche	0	1	1	2	2	0	1	X	7

Sheet 4	1	2	3	4	5	6	7	8	Final
(Saskatchewan) Amber Holland	0	0	3	0	1	0	2	1	7
(New Brunswick) Sandy Comeau 🔨	1	1	0	1	0	3	0	0	6

Sheet 5	1	2	3	4	5	6	7	8	9	Final
(Saskatchewan) Stefanie Lawton	0	3	1	0	1	0	1	0	1	7
(Alberta) Heather Rankin 🔨	1	0	0	2	0	2	0	1	0	6

Sheet 6	1	2	3	4	5	6	7	8	Final
(Nova Scotia) Colleen Jones	0	0	1	1	1	0	0	1	4
(Ontario) Julie Reddick 🔨	1	0	0	0	0	1	0	0	2

Sheet 7	1	2	3	4	5	6	7	8	Final
(Newfoundland and Labrador) Heather Strong	1	0	2	0	1	0	1	0	5
(Alberta) Cheryl Bernard 🔨	0	1	0	1	0	1	0	1	4

Sheet 8	1	2	3	4	5	6	7	8	Final
(Prince Edward Island) Marie Christianson	0	0	1	0	1	0	X	X	2
(Manitoba) Jennifer Jones 🔨	3	1	0	2	0	3	X	X	9

=== Draw 9 ===
Saturday, December 1, 8:30 am

Sheet 1	1	2	3	4	5	6	7	8	Final
(Ontario) Alison Goring 🔨	3	0	2	0	0	1	3	X	9
(Nova Scotia) Mary-Anne Arsenault	0	1	0	1	1	0	0	X	3

Sheet 2	1	2	3	4	5	6	7	8	9	Final
(Manitoba) Jennifer Jones	0	0	2	0	1	2	1	0	0	6
(Saskatchewan) Stefanie Lawton 🔨	2	0	0	2	0	0	0	2	1	7

Sheet 3	1	2	3	4	5	6	7	8	Final
(Newfoundland and Labrador) Heather Strong	0	1	0	0	2	0	2	0	5
(Nova Scotia) Colleen Jones 🔨	2	0	1	0	0	1	0	2	6

Sheet 4	1	2	3	4	5	6	7	8	9	Final
(Alberta) Shannon Kleibrink 🔨	1	0	0	2	0	1	0	0	1	5
(Quebec) Ève Bélisle	0	1	0	0	1	0	1	1	0	4

Sheet 5	1	2	3	4	5	6	7	8	Final
(Prince Edward Island) Shelly Bradley	0	1	0	0	X	X	X	X	1
(Prince Edward Island) Suzanne Birt 🔨	2	0	3	5	X	X	X	X	10

Sheet 6	1	2	3	4	5	6	7	8	9	Final
(Saskatchewan) Jolene McIvor	1	0	2	1	0	0	2	0	1	7
(Saskatchewan) Amber Holland 🔨	0	2	0	0	1	1	0	2	0	6

Sheet 7	1	2	3	4	5	6	7	8	Final
(Ontario) Sherry Middaugh 🔨	0	4	1	1	0	1	0	X	7
(Alberta) Kristie Moore	2	0	0	0	1	0	1	X	4

Sheet 8	1	2	3	4	5	6	7	8	Final
(Nova Scotia) Meredith Harrison	0	1	1	0	2	1	0	3	8
(Ontario) Colleen Madonia 🔨	2	0	0	1	0	0	3	0	6

=== Draw 10 ===
Saturday, December 1, 11:30 am

Sheet 1	1	2	3	4	5	6	7	8	Final
(Nova Scotia) Colleen Jones	0	0	1	0	0	0	0	X	1
(Alberta) Shannon Kleibrink 🔨	0	1	0	1	0	0	1	X	3

Sheet 2	1	2	3	4	5	6	7	8	Final
(Ontario) Sherry Middaugh 🔨	1	0	2	0	1	0	1	X	5
(Quebec) Ève Bélisle	0	1	0	1	0	2	0	X	4

Sheet 3	1	2	3	4	5	6	7	8	Final
(Nova Scotia) Meredith Harrison 🔨	1	0	1	0	3	0	3	X	8
(Nova Scotia) Mary-Anne Arsenault	0	2	0	3	0	1	0	X	6

Sheet 4	1	2	3	4	5	6	7	8	9	Final
(Saskatchewan) Stefanie Lawton 🔨	0	1	0	1	1	0	0	1	1	5
(Ontario) Alison Goring	2	0	1	0	0	1	0	0	0	4

Sheet 5	1	2	3	4	5	6	7	8	Final
(Alberta) Cheryl Bernard	0	1	2	0	0	0	2	3	8
(Ontario) Julie Reddick 🔨	1	0	0	2	1	1	0	0	5

Sheet 6	1	2	3	4	5	6	7	8	Final
(Ontario) Janet McGhee	0	2	1	0	2	0	0	X	5
(Newfoundland and Labrador) Heather Strong 🔨	3	0	0	2	0	2	1	X	8

Sheet 7	1	2	3	4	5	6	7	8	Final
(United States) Patti Lank 🔨	0	1	0	0	X	X	X	X	1
(Manitoba) Jennifer Jones	3	0	3	2	X	X	X	X	8

Sheet 8	1	2	3	4	5	6	7	8	Final
(Prince Edward Island) Marie Christianson 🔨	1	0	2	1	0	0	0	X	4
(Alberta) Heather Rankin	0	2	0	0	3	1	2	X	8

=== Draw 11 ===
Saturday, December 1, 4:30 pm

Sheet 1	1	2	3	4	5	6	7	8	Final
(Prince Edward Island) Suzanne Birt 🔨	1	2	0	1	1	0	4	X	9
(Alberta) Heather Rankin	0	0	2	0	0	1	0	X	3

Sheet 2	1	2	3	4	5	6	7	8	Final
(Saskatchewan) Jolene McIvor	0	1	0	2	0	3	3	1	10
(Alberta) Cheryl Bernard 🔨	2	0	4	0	2	0	0	0	8

=== Draw 12 ===
Saturday, December 1, 7:30 pm

Sheet 1	1	2	3	4	5	6	7	8	Final
(Saskatchewan) Jolene McIvor	0	1	0	0	1	0	X	X	2
(Ontario) Alison Goring 🔨	2	0	2	1	0	2	X	X	7

Sheet 2	1	2	3	4	5	6	7	8	9	Final
(Ontario) Sherry Middaugh 🔨	1	0	1	0	1	1	0	1	1	6
(Manitoba) Jennifer Jones	0	2	0	2	0	0	1	0	0	5

Sheet 3	1	2	3	4	5	6	7	8	Final
(Prince Edward Island) Suzanne Birt	0	1	0	0	2	0	3	X	6
(Nova Scotia) Colleen Jones 🔨	1	0	0	1	0	1	0	X	3

Sheet 4	1	2	3	4	5	6	7	8	Final
(Newfoundland and Labrador) Heather Strong	0	0	0	1	0	1	0	X	2
(Nova Scotia) Meredith Harrison 🔨	1	1	1	0	3	0	2	X	8

== Playoffs ==
Quarterfinals
A1	(New Brunswick) Andrea Kelly	6
C2	(Nova Scotia) Meredith Harrison	4
B1	(Saskatchewan) Stefanie Lawton	5
C3	(Ontario) Sherry Middaugh	6
A2	(Quebec) Marie-France Larouche	10
C1	(Prince Edward Island) Suzanne Birt	5
B2	(Alberta) Shannon Kleibrink	6
C4	(Ontario) Alison Goring	5

Semifinals
A1	(New Brunswick) Andrea Kelly	2
C3	(Ontario) Sherry Middaugh	7
A2	(Quebec) Marie-France Larouche	5
B2	(Alberta) Shannon Kleibrink	4

Final
C3	(Ontario) Sherry Middaugh	6
A2	(Quebec) Marie-France Larouche	4

=== Quarterfinals ===
Sunday, December 2, 8:00 am

Team	1	2	3	4	5	6	7	8	Final
(New Brunswick) Andrea Kelly	0	0	1	0	2	1	0	2	6
(Nova Scotia) Meredith Harrison 🔨	0	2	0	1	0	0	1	0	4

Team	1	2	3	4	5	6	7	8	9	Final
(Saskatchewan) Stefanie Lawton	0	1	0	2	0	1	0	1	0	5
(Ontario) Sherry Middaugh 🔨	2	0	2	0	1	0	0	0	1	6

Team	1	2	3	4	5	6	7	8	Final
(Quebec) Marie-France Larouche	0	4	1	3	0	1	1	X	10
(Prince Edward Island) Suzanne Birt 🔨	2	0	0	0	3	0	0	X	5

Team	1	2	3	4	5	6	7	8	Final
(Alberta) Shannon Kleibrink	0	0	3	2	0	1	0	X	6
(Ontario) Alison Goring 🔨	1	1	0	0	2	0	1	X	5

=== Semifinals ===
Sunday, December 2, 11:00 am

Team	1	2	3	4	5	6	7	8	Final
(New Brunswick) Andrea Kelly	0	0	0	1	0	1	0	X	2
(Ontario) Sherry Middaugh 🔨	0	1	1	0	3	0	2	X	7

Team	1	2	3	4	5	6	7	8	Final
(Quebec) Marie-France Larouche 🔨	0	1	0	0	2	0	0	2	5
(Alberta) Shannon Kleibrink	0	0	1	1	0	1	1	0	4

=== Final ===
Sunday, December 2, 2:00 pm

Team	1	2	3	4	5	6	7	8	Final
(Ontario) Sherry Middaugh	0	2	1	2	1	0	0	X	6
(Quebec) Marie-France Larouche 🔨	1	0	0	0	0	2	1	X	4
