= 2011 Manitoba Lotteries Women's Curling Classic =

Women's curling competition

- Host city: Winnipeg, Manitoba
- Arena: Fort Rouge Curling Club
- Dates: October 21–24
- Winner: (Alberta) Renée Sonnenberg
- Curling club: Saville Sports Centre, Edmonton
- Skip: Renée Sonnenberg
- Third: Lawnie MacDonald
- Second: Kristie Moore
- Lead: Rona Pasika
- Finalist: (Alberta) Heather Nedohin

The 2011 Manitoba Lotteries Women's Curling Classic was held October 21 to 24 at the Fort Rouge Curling Club in Winnipeg, Manitoba. It was the second women's Grand Slam event of the 2011–12 curling season and the eighth time the tournament has been held. The purse was CAD60,000, which the winning team of Renée Sonnenberg won and took home CAD$15,000.

== Teams ==
Skip	Third	Second	Lead	Locale
Cheryl Bernard	Susan O'Connor	Lori Olson-Johns	Jennifer Sadleir	Calgary, Alberta
Erika Brown	Debbie McCormick	Ann Swisshelm	Jessica Schultz	Madison, Wisconsin
Joelle Brown	Tracey Lavery	Susan Baleja	Jennifer Cawson	Winnipeg, Manitoba
Chelsea Carey	Kristy Jenion	Kristen Foster	Lindsay Titheridge	Morden, Manitoba
Chantelle Eberle	Nancy Inglis	Debbie Lozinski	Susan Hoffart	Regina, Saskatchewan
Dana Ferguson	Nikki Smith	Denise Kinghorn	Cori Morris	Calgary, Alberta
Satsuki Fujisawa	Miyo Ichikawa	Emi Shimizu	Miyuki Satoh	Karuizawa, Japan
Janet Harvey	Cherie-Ann Loder	Kristin Loder	Carey Kirby	Winnipeg, Manitoba
Julie Hastings	Christy Trombley	Stacey Smith	Katrina Collins	Thornhill, Ontario
Amber Holland	Kim Schneider	Tammy Schneider	Heather Kalenchuk	Kronau, Saskatchewan
Rachel Homan	Emma Miskew	Alison Kreviazuk	Lisa Weagle	Ottawa, Ontario
Jennifer Jones	Kaitlyn Lawes	Joëlle Sabourin	Dawn Askin	Winnipeg, Manitoba
Jessie Kaufman	Nicky Kaufman	Amanda Coderre	Stephanie Enright	Edmonton, Alberta
Stefanie Lawton	Sherry Anderson	Sherri Singler	Marliese Kasner	Saskatoon, Saskatchewan
Kim Link	Maureen Bonar	Colleen Kilgallen	Renee Fletcher	East St. Paul, Manitoba
Krista McCarville	Ashley Miharija	Kari Lavoie	Sarah Lang	Thunder Bay, Ontario
Deb McCreanor	Ashley Meakin	Stephanie Armstrong-Craplewe	Laurie Macdonell	La Salle, Manitoba
Briane Meilleur	Krysten Karwacki	Amy Agnew	Meagan Grenkow	Winnipeg, Manitoba
Sherry Middaugh	Jo-Ann Rizzo	Lee Merklinger	Leigh Armstrong	Coldwater, Ontario
Michelle Montford	Courtney Blanchard	Sara Jones	Sarah Norget	Winnipeg, Manitoba
Heather Nedohin	Beth Iskiw	Jessica Mair	Laine Peters	Edmonton, Alberta
Anette Norberg	Cecilia Östlund	Sara Carlsson	Liselotta Lennartsson	Harnosand, Sweden
Cathy Overton-Clapham	Jenna Loder	Ashley Howard	Breanne Meakin	Winnipeg, Manitoba
Desirée Owen	Cary-Anne Sallows	Lindsay Makichuk	Stephanie Malekoff	Grande Prairie, Alberta
Darcy Robertson	Calleen Neufeld	Vanessa Foster	Michelle Kruk	Winnipeg, Manitoba
Kelly Scott	Dailene Sivertson	Sasha Carter	Jacquie Armstrong	Kelowna, British Columbia
Margaretha Sigfridsson	Christina Bertrup	Maria Wennerström	Maria Prytz	Umea, Sweden
Heather Smith-Dacey	Danielle Parsons	Blisse Comstock	Teri Lake	Halifax, Nova Scotia
Renée Sonnenberg	Lawnie MacDonald	Kristie Moore	Rona Pasika	Grande Prairie, Alberta
Barb Spencer	Karen Klein	Ainsley Champagne	Raunora Westcott	Winnipeg, Manitoba
Valerie Sweeting	Leslie Rogers	Joanne Taylor	Rachelle Pidherny	Edmonton, Alberta
Jill Thurston	Kerri Einarson	Kendra Georges	Sarah Wazney	Winnipeg, Manitoba

== Knockout Draw Brackets ==
=== A event ===
First Knockout
(Manitoba) Deb McCreanor	2
(Manitoba) Jennifer Jones	8
(Manitoba) Jill Thurston	1
(Alberta) Renée Sonnenberg	7
(Ontario) Sherry Middaugh	4
(Alberta) Dana Ferguson	7
(Wisconsin) Erika Brown	3
(Sweden) Anette Norberg	7
(Saskatchewan) Stefanie Lawton	9
(Manitoba) Joelle Brown	3
(Manitoba) Kim Link	3
(Ontario) Krista McCarville	9
(Manitoba) Chelsea Carey	7
(Manitoba) Janet Harvey	8
(Alberta) Desirée Owen	7
(Alberta) Valerie Sweeting	5

Quarterfinals
(Manitoba) Jennifer Jones	7
(Alberta) Renée Sonnenberg	6
(Alberta) Dana Ferguson	5
(Sweden) Anette Norberg	4
(Saskatchewan) Stefanie Lawton	2
(Ontario) Krista McCarville	6
(Manitoba) Janet Harvey	2
(Alberta) Desirée Owen	9

Semifinals
(Manitoba) Jennifer Jones	5
(Alberta) Dana Ferguson	2
(Ontario) Krista McCarville	4
(Alberta) Desirée Owen	5

Qualifier 1
(Manitoba) Jennifer Jones	9
(Alberta) Desirée Owen	3

First Knockout
(Saskatchewan) Amber Holland	5
(Manitoba) Briane Meilleur	3
(British Columbia) Kelly Scott	7
(Ontario) Julie Hastings	4
(Sweden) Margaretha Sigfridsson	6
(Manitoba) Barb Spencer	5
(Alberta) Jessie Kaufman	6
(Japan) Satsuki Fujisawa	7
(Manitoba) Darcy Robertson	7
(Alberta) Heather Nedohin	6
(Alberta) Cheryl Bernard	6
(Saskatchewan) Chantelle Eberle	4
(Manitoba) Cathy Overton-Clapham	5
(Nova Scotia) Heather Smith-Dacey	6
(Ontario) Rachel Homan	8
(Manitoba) Michelle Montford	0

Quarterfinals
(Saskatchewan) Amber Holland	2
(British Columbia) Kelly Scott	8
(Sweden) Margaretha Sigfridsson	7
(Japan) Satsuki Fujisawa	0
(Manitoba) Darcy Robertson	5
(Alberta) Cheryl Bernard	3
(Nova Scotia) Heather Smith-Dacey	2
(Ontario) Rachel Homan	6

Semifinals
(British Columbia) Kelly Scott	4
(Sweden) Margaretha Sigfridsson	5
(Manitoba) Darcy Robertson	7
(Ontario) Rachel Homan	4

Qualifier 2
(Sweden) Margaretha Sigfridsson	3
(Manitoba) Darcy Robertson	9

=== B event ===
Second Knockout
(Manitoba) Deb McCreanor	3
(Manitoba) Jill Thurston	4
(Ontario) Sherry Middaugh	5
(Wisconsin) Erika Brown	7
(Manitoba) Joelle Brown	9
(Manitoba) Kim Link	4
(Manitoba) Chelsea Carey	5
(Alberta) Valerie Sweeting	4

Quarterfinals
(Manitoba) Jill Thurston	6
(Wisconsin) Erika Brown	2
(Manitoba) Joelle Brown	2
(Manitoba) Chelsea Carey	6

Semifinals
(Manitoba) Jill Thurston	2
(British Columbia) Kelly Scott	8
(Manitoba) Chelsea Carey	5
(Ontario) Rachel Homan	6

To Qualifier 3
(British Columbia) Kelly Scott	8
(Ontario) Rachel Homan	2

Second Knockout
(Saskatchewan) Amber Holland	10
(Japan) Satsuki Fujisawa	1
(Alberta) Cheryl Bernard	6
(Nova Scotia) Heather Smith-Dacey	7

Semifinals
(Saskatchewan) Amber Holland	8
(Nova Scotia) Heather Smith-Dacey	1

To Qualifier 3
(Saskatchewan) Amber Holland	5
(Alberta) Desirée Owen	9
Qualifier 3
(British Columbia) Kelly Scott	8
(Alberta) Desirée Owen	3

Second Knockout
(Manitoba) Briane Meilleur	3
(Ontario) Julie Hastings	6
(Manitoba) Barb Spencer	5
(Alberta) Jessie Kaufman	4
(Alberta) Heather Nedohin	5
(Saskatchewan) Chantelle Eberle	4
(Manitoba) Cathy Overton-Clapham	8
(Manitoba) Michelle Montford	4

Quarterfinals
(Ontario) Julie Hastings	7
(Manitoba) Barb Spencer	2
(Alberta) Heather Nedohin	4
(Manitoba) Cathy Overton-Clapham	5

Semifinals
(Alberta) Dana Ferguson	5
(Ontario) Julie Hastings	6
(Ontario) Krista McCarville	1
(Manitoba) Cathy Overton-Clapham	9

To Qualifier 4
(Ontario) Julie Hastings	5
(Manitoba) Cathy Overton-Clapham	7

Second Knockout
(Alberta) Renée Sonnenberg	5
(Sweden) Anette Norberg	2
(Saskatchewan) Stefanie Lawton	8
(Manitoba) Janet Harvey	4

Semifinals
(Alberta) Renée Sonnenberg	5
(Saskatchewan) Stefanie Lawton	8

To Qualifier 4
(Saskatchewan) Stefanie Lawton	5
(Sweden) Margaretha Sigfridsson	2
Qualifier 4
(Manitoba) Cathy Overton-Clapham	5
(Saskatchewan) Stefanie Lawton	9

=== C event ===
Third Knockout
(Manitoba) Deb McCreanor	5
(Ontario) Sherry Middaugh	8

Quarterfinals
(Alberta) Renée Sonnenberg	4
(Ontario) Sherry Middaugh	3
(Alberta) Dana Ferguson	7
(Ontario) Krista McCarville	6

Semifinals
(Alberta) Renée Sonnenberg	8
(Alberta) Dana Ferguson	1

Qualifier 5
(Alberta) Renée Sonnenberg	7
(Alberta) Desirée Owen	5

Third Knockout
(Manitoba) Kim Link	3
(Alberta) Valerie Sweeting	6
(Wisconsin) Erika Brown	8
(Manitoba) Joelle Brown	3

Quarterfinals
(Alberta) Valerie Sweeting	8
(Japan) Satsuki Fujisawa	5
(Alberta) Cheryl Bernard	7
(Wisconsin) Erika Brown	5

Semifinals
(Alberta) Valerie Sweeting	5
(Sweden) Margaretha Sigfridsson	6
(Alberta) Cheryl Bernard	8
(Ontario) Julie Hastings	5

Qualifier 6
(Sweden) Margaretha Sigfridsson	6
(Alberta) Cheryl Bernard	7

Third Knockout
(Manitoba) Barb Spencer	7
(Alberta) Heather Nedohin	8
(Manitoba) Briane Meilleur	5
(Alberta) Jessie Kaufman	2

Quarterfinals
(Sweden) Anette Norberg	4
(Alberta) Heather Nedohin	8
(Manitoba) Janet Harvey	4
(Manitoba) Briane Meilleur	6

Semifinals
(Alberta) Heather Nedohin	8
(Ontario) Rachel Homan	4
(Manitoba) Briane Meilleur	1
(Saskatchewan) Amber Holland	7

Qualifier 7
(Alberta) Heather Nedohin	5
(Saskatchewan) Amber Holland	3

Third Knockout
(Saskatchewan) Chantelle Eberle	5
(Manitoba) Michelle Montford	9

Quarterfinals
(Manitoba) Jill Thurston	4
(Manitoba) Chelsea Carey	5
(Nova Scotia) Heather Smith-Dacey	5
(Manitoba) Michelle Montford	4

Semifinals
(Manitoba) Chelsea Carey	7
(Nova Scotia) Heather Smith-Dacey	4

Qualifier 8
(Manitoba) Chelsea Carey	3
(Manitoba) Cathy Overton-Clapham	4

== Knockout results ==
=== Draw 1 ===
October 21, 9:00 AM CT

Sheet 1	1	2	3	4	5	6	7	8	Final
(Manitoba) Deb McCreanor	0	1	0	1	0	0	0	X	2
(Manitoba) Jennifer Jones 🔨	2	0	2	0	2	1	1	X	8

Sheet 2	1	2	3	4	5	6	7	8	Final
(Manitoba) Jill Thurston	0	1	0	0	0	0	X	X	1
(Alberta) Renee Sonnenberg 🔨	2	0	1	0	2	2	X	X	7

Sheet 3	1	2	3	4	5	6	7	8	Final
(Ontario) Sherry Middaugh 🔨	0	1	0	2	1	0	0	0	4
(Alberta) Dana Ferguson	1	0	1	0	0	2	2	1	7

Sheet 4	1	2	3	4	5	6	7	8	Final
(Wisconsin) Erika Brown	0	1	0	0	1	0	1	0	3
(Sweden) Anette Norberg 🔨	1	0	3	0	0	2	0	1	7

Sheet 5	1	2	3	4	5	6	7	8	Final
(Saskatchewan) Stefanie Lawton	1	0	0	2	0	6	X	X	9
(Manitoba) Joelle Brown 🔨	0	0	2	0	1	0	X	X	3

Sheet 6	1	2	3	4	5	6	7	8	Final
(Manitoba) Kim Link	0	1	0	1	0	1	0	X	3
(Ontario) Krista McCarville 🔨	1	0	2	0	2	0	4	X	9

=== Draw 2 ===
October 21, 12:00 PM CT

Sheet 1	1	2	3	4	5	6	7	8	Final
(Manitoba) Chelsea Carey 🔨	2	0	2	0	2	0	1	0	7
(Manitoba) Janet Harvey	0	2	0	2	0	2	0	2	8

Sheet 2	1	2	3	4	5	6	7	8	Final
(Alberta) Desiree Owen 🔨	0	0	0	1	0	2	2	2	7
(Alberta) Valerie Sweeting	0	2	0	0	3	0	0	0	5

Sheet 3	1	2	3	4	5	6	7	8	Final
(Saskatchewan) Amber Holland 🔨	2	0	0	1	0	1	0	1	5
(Manitoba) Briane Meilleur	0	1	0	0	1	0	1	0	3

Sheet 4	1	2	3	4	5	6	7	8	Final
(British Columbia) Kelly Scott	0	2	0	1	0	2	0	2	7
(Ontario) Julie Hastings	0	0	2	0	1	0	1	0	4

Sheet 5	1	2	3	4	5	6	7	8	9	Final
(Sweden) Margaretha Sigfridsson 🔨	0	1	0	0	3	0	0	1	1	6
(Manitoba) Barb Spencer	1	0	1	1	0	2	0	0	0	5

Sheet 6	1	2	3	4	5	6	7	8	Final
(Alberta) Jessie Kaufman 🔨	0	3	0	0	1	0	1	1	6
(Japan) Satsuki Fujisawa	1	0	3	0	0	3	0	0	7

=== Draw 3 ===
October 21, 3:00 PM CT

Sheet 1	1	2	3	4	5	6	7	8	9	Final
(Manitoba) Darcy Robertson 🔨	1	1	0	1	0	1	0	2	1	7
(Alberta) Heather Nedohin	0	0	1	0	3	0	2	0	0	6

Sheet 2	1	2	3	4	5	6	7	8	Final
(Alberta) Cheryl Bernard	1	2	1	0	0	2	0	X	6
(Saskatchewan) Chantelle Eberle 🔨	0	0	0	3	0	0	1	X	4

Sheet 3	1	2	3	4	5	6	7	8	Final
(Manitoba) Cathy Overton-Clapham 🔨	2	0	2	0	0	1	0	0	5
(Nova Scotia) Heather Smith-Dacey	0	1	0	1	1	0	2	1	6

Sheet 4	1	2	3	4	5	6	7	8	Final
(Ontario) Rachel Homan 🔨	2	1	1	1	1	2	X	X	8
(Manitoba) Michelle Montford	0	0	0	0	0	0	X	X	0

Sheet 5	1	2	3	4	5	6	7	8	Final
(Manitoba) Deb McCreanor	0	1	0	0	1	1	0	0	3
(Manitoba) Jill Thurston 🔨	1	0	1	0	0	0	1	1	4

Sheet 6	1	2	3	4	5	6	7	8	Final
(Ontario) Sherry Middaugh	0	2	0	1	0	2	0	0	5
(Wisconsin) Erika Brown 🔨	1	0	0	0	2	0	2	2	7

=== Draw 4 ===
October 21, 6:00 PM CT

Sheet 1	1	2	3	4	5	6	7	8	Final
(Manitoba) Jennifer Jones 🔨	1	0	4	0	1	0	1	0	7
(Alberta) Renee Sonnenberg	0	1	0	3	0	1	0	1	6

Sheet 2	1	2	3	4	5	6	7	8	Final
(Alberta) Dana Ferguson 🔨	2	1	1	0	1	0	0	X	5
(Sweden) Anette Norberg	0	0	0	2	0	1	1	X	4

Sheet 3	1	2	3	4	5	6	7	8	Final
(Saskatchewan) Stefanie Lawton	0	1	0	0	1	0	0	X	2
(Ontario) Krista McCarville	1	0	1	0	0	2	2	X	6

Sheet 4	1	2	3	4	5	6	7	8	Final
(Manitoba) Janet Harvey	0	0	1	0	1	0	X	X	2
(Alberta) Desiree Owen	2	2	0	2	0	3	X	X	9

Sheet 5	1	2	3	4	5	6	7	8	Final
(Manitoba) Joelle Brown	0	0	1	0	2	1	5	X	9
(Manitoba) Kim Link 🔨	0	1	0	3	0	0	0	X	4

Sheet 6	1	2	3	4	5	6	7	8	9	Final
(Manitoba) Chelsea Carey	0	0	0	2	0	1	1	0	1	5
(Alberta) Valerie Sweeting	0	1	1	0	2	0	0	0	0	4

=== Draw 5 ===
October 21, 9:00 PM CT

Sheet 1	1	2	3	4	5	6	7	8	Final
(Saskatchewan) Amber Holland	0	1	0	1	0	0	X	X	2
(British Columbia) Kelly Scott 🔨	3	0	2	0	2	1	X	X	8

Sheet 2	1	2	3	4	5	6	7	8	Final
(Sweden) Margaretha Sigfridsson	3	0	2	0	2	X	X	X	7
(Japan) Satsuki Fujisawa 🔨	0	0	0	0	0	X	X	X	0

Sheet 3	1	2	3	4	5	6	7	8	Final
(Manitoba) Darcy Robertson	0	1	0	1	0	0	1	2	5
(Alberta) Cheryl Bernard 🔨	0	0	1	0	1	1	0	0	3

Sheet 4	1	2	3	4	5	6	7	8	Final
(Nova Scotia) Heather Smith-Dacey	0	1	0	0	0	1	X	X	2
(Ontario) Rachel Homan 🔨	1	0	2	3	0	0	X	X	6

Sheet 5	1	2	3	4	5	6	7	8	Final
(Manitoba) Briane Meilleur	0	0	0	0	1	2	0	0	3
(Ontario) Julie Hastings 🔨	1	1	0	1	0	0	2	1	6

Sheet 6	1	2	3	4	5	6	7	8	Final
(Manitoba) Barb Spencer 🔨	0	1	2	0	0	1	0	1	5
(Alberta) Jessie Kaufman	2	0	0	1	1	0	0	0	4

=== Draw 6 ===
October 22, 9:00 AM CT

Sheet 1	1	2	3	4	5	6	7	8	Final
(Manitoba) Jennifer Jones 🔨	1	0	3	0	0	1	0	X	5
(Alberta) Dana Ferguson	0	1	0	0	1	0	0	X	2

Sheet 2	1	2	3	4	5	6	7	8	Final
(Ontario) Krista McCarville	0	0	1	0	0	1	2	0	4
(Alberta) Desiree Owen 🔨	1	1	0	1	1	0	0	1	5

Sheet 3	1	2	3	4	5	6	7	8	Final
(Alberta) Heather Nedohin 🔨	0	2	1	0	0	1	0	1	5
(Saskatchewan) Chantelle Eberle	1	0	0	1	1	0	1	0	4

Sheet 4	1	2	3	4	5	6	7	8	Final
(Manitoba) Cathy Overton-Clapham 🔨	0	1	1	0	0	2	2	2	8
(Manitoba) Michelle Montford	1	0	0	2	1	0	0	0	4

Sheet 5	1	2	3	4	5	6	7	8	Final
(Manitoba) Jill Thurston 🔨	1	0	2	0	1	0	2	X	6
(Wisconsin) Erika Brown	0	0	0	1	0	1	0	X	2

Sheet 6	1	2	3	4	5	6	7	8	Final
(Manitoba) Joelle Brown 🔨	0	0	1	0	0	1	0	X	2
(Manitoba) Chelsea Carey	0	2	0	0	1	0	3	X	6

=== Draw 7 ===
October 22, 12:00 PM CT

Sheet 1	1	2	3	4	5	6	7	8	Final
(British Columbia) Kelly Scott 🔨	0	1	0	0	2	0	1	0	4
(Sweden) Margaretha Sigfridsson	0	0	1	2	0	1	0	1	5

Sheet 2	1	2	3	4	5	6	7	8	Final
(Manitoba) Darcy Robertson 🔨	2	1	1	0	1	0	1	1	7
(Ontario) Rachel Homan	0	0	0	3	0	1	0	0	4

Sheet 3	1	2	3	4	5	6	7	8	Final
(Saskatchewan) Amber Holland 🔨	2	1	0	5	2	X	X	X	10
(Japan) Satsuki Fujisawa	0	0	1	0	0	X	X	X	1

Sheet 4	1	2	3	4	5	6	7	8	9	Final
(Alberta) Cheryl Bernard	1	2	0	0	2	0	0	1	0	6
(Nova Scotia) Heather Smith-Dacey 🔨	0	0	1	2	0	2	1	0	1	7

Sheet 5	1	2	3	4	5	6	7	8	Final
(Alberta) Renee Sonnenberg 🔨	1	0	0	1	1	1	0	1	5
(Sweden) Anette Norberg	0	1	0	0	0	0	1	0	2

Sheet 6	1	2	3	4	5	6	7	8	Final
(Saskatchewan) Stefanie Lawton 🔨	0	2	0	2	0	1	0	3	8
(Manitoba) Janet Harvey	2	0	1	0	1	0	0	0	4

=== Draw 8 ===
October 22, 3:00 PM CT

Sheet 1	1	2	3	4	5	6	7	8	Final
(Ontario) Julie Hastings	0	1	0	3	2	1	X	X	7
(Manitoba) Barb Spencer 🔨	1	0	1	0	0	0	X	X	2

Sheet 2	1	2	3	4	5	6	7	8	9	Final
(Alberta) Heather Nedohin	0	0	0	2	0	1	0	1	0	4
(Manitoba) Cathy Overton-Clapham 🔨	0	0	1	0	1	0	2	0	1	5

Sheet 3	1	2	3	4	5	6	7	8	Final
(Manitoba) Deb McCreanor	0	1	0	0	3	0	1	0	5
(Ontario) Sherry Middaugh 🔨	2	0	3	1	0	1	0	1	8

Sheet 4	1	2	3	4	5	6	7	8	Final
(Manitoba) Kim Link	0	2	0	0	0	1	0	0	3
(Alberta) Valerie Sweeting 🔨	0	0	1	1	2	0	1	1	6

Sheet 5	1	2	3	4	5	6	7	8	Final
(Wisconsin) Erika Brown 🔨	3	0	0	2	2	0	1	X	9
(Manitoba) Joelle Brown	0	1	1	0	0	1	0	X	3

Sheet 6	1	2	3	4	5	6	7	8	Final
(Saskatchewan) Chantelle Eberle 🔨	2	0	2	0	1	0	0	X	5
(Manitoba) Michelle Montford	0	1	0	2	0	4	2	X	9

=== Draw 9 ===
October 22, 6:00 PM CT

Sheet 1	1	2	3	4	5	6	7	8	Final
(Manitoba) Jennifer Jones 🔨	4	0	3	0	2	X	X	X	9
(Alberta) Desiree Owen	0	1	0	2	0	X	X	X	3

Sheet 2	1	2	3	4	5	6	7	8	Final
(Sweden) Margaretha Sigfridsson	0	0	0	3	0	0	X	X	3
(Manitoba) Darcy Robertson 🔨	0	3	0	0	4	2	X	X	9

Sheet 3	1	2	3	4	5	6	7	8	Final
(Manitoba) Jill Thurston 🔨	0	0	0	2	0	0	X	X	2
(British Columbia) Kelly Scott	3	1	1	0	2	1	X	X	8

Sheet 4	1	2	3	4	5	6	7	8	Final
(Manitoba) Chelsea Carey	0	3	0	0	1	0	1	0	5
(Ontario) Rachel Homan 🔨	2	0	1	1	0	1	0	1	6

Sheet 5	1	2	3	4	5	6	7	8	Final
(Saskatchewan) Amber Holland 🔨	0	1	2	0	5	X	X	X	8
(Nova Scotia) Heather Smith-Dacey	0	0	0	1	0	X	X	X	1

Sheet 6	1	2	3	4	5	6	7	8	Final
(Alberta) Renee Sonnenberg 🔨	0	0	2	0	2	1	0	0	5
(Saskatchewan) Stefanie Lawton	1	3	0	2	0	0	1	1	8

=== Draw 10 ===
October 22, 9:00 PM CT

Sheet 1	1	2	3	4	5	6	7	8	Final
(Alberta) Dana Ferguson	0	0	1	0	2	0	2	0	5
(Ontario) Julie Hastings 🔨	0	1	0	2	0	2	0	1	6

Sheet 2	1	2	3	4	5	6	7	8	Final
(Ontario) Krista McCarville	0	0	1	0	0	X	X	X	1
(Manitoba) Cathy Overton-Clapham 🔨	1	1	0	3	4	X	X	X	9

Sheet 3	1	2	3	4	5	6	7	8	9	Final
(Manitoba) Barb Spencer	0	2	0	2	0	2	0	1	0	7
(Alberta) Heather Nedohin	0	0	3	0	3	0	1	0	1	8

Sheet 4	1	2	3	4	5	6	7	8	Final
(Manitoba) Briane Meilleur 🔨	0	0	0	2	0	1	2	0	5
(Alberta) Jessie Kaufman	0	0	0	0	1	0	0	1	2

Sheet 5	1	2	3	4	5	6	7	8	Final
(Alberta) Valerie Sweeting	0	2	0	4	0	0	2	X	8
(Japan) Satsuki Fujisawa 🔨	2	0	1	0	1	1	0	X	5

Sheet 6	1	2	3	4	5	6	7	8	Final
(Alberta) Cheryl Bernard 🔨	1	0	1	1	2	0	1	1	7
(Wisconsin) Erika Brown	0	2	0	0	0	3	0	0	5

=== Draw 11 ===
October 23, 9:00 AM CT

Sheet 1	1	2	3	4	5	6	7	8	Final
(British Columbia) Kelly Scott 🔨	0	3	0	4	1	X	X	X	8
(Ontario) Rachel Homan	0	0	2	0	0	X	X	X	2

Sheet 2	1	2	3	4	5	6	7	8	Final
(Saskatchewan) Amber Holland 🔨	0	2	0	1	0	2	0	0	5
(Alberta) Desiree Owen	1	0	2	0	2	0	2	2	9

Sheet 3	1	2	3	4	5	6	7	8	Final
(Saskatchewan) Stefanie Lawton 🔨	2	0	0	0	0	2	1	X	5
(Sweden) Margaretha Sigfridsson	0	1	1	0	0	0	0	X	2

Sheet 4	1	2	3	4	5	6	7	8	9	Final
(Ontario) Julie Hastings	0	2	0	0	1	0	1	1	0	5
(Manitoba) Cathy Overton-Clapham 🔨	2	0	1	1	0	1	0	0	2	7

Sheet 5	1	2	3	4	5	6	7	8	Final
(Manitoba) Jill Thurston	0	1	0	1	0	0	2	0	4
(Manitoba) Chelsea Carey 🔨	0	0	1	0	1	2	0	1	5

Sheet 6	1	2	3	4	5	6	7	8	Final
(Nova Scotia) Heather Smith-Dacey 🔨	0	2	2	0	0	0	0	1	5
(Manitoba) Michelle Montford	1	0	0	1	1	0	1	0	4

=== Draw 12 ===
October 22, 12:30 PM CT

Sheet 1	1	2	3	4	5	6	7	8	Final
(Saskatchewan) Stefanie Lawton	0	2	1	0	3	0	0	3	9
(Manitoba) Cathy Overton-Clapham 🔨	2	0	0	1	0	1	1	0	5

Sheet 2	1	2	3	4	5	6	7	8	Final
(Alberta) Renee Sonnenberg 🔨	0	1	0	1	0	0	1	1	4
(Ontario) Sherry Middaugh	0	0	2	0	0	1	0	0	3

Sheet 3	1	2	3	4	5	6	7	8	9	Final
(Alberta) Dana Ferguson	0	0	0	2	0	2	0	2	1	7
(Ontario) Krista McCarville 🔨	0	0	3	0	2	0	1	0	0	6

Sheet 4	1	2	3	4	5	6	7	8	Final
(Sweden) Anette Norberg	0	0	0	1	0	3	0	X	4
(Alberta) Heather Nedohin 🔨	1	1	2	0	1	0	3	X	8

Sheet 5	1	2	3	4	5	6	7	8	Final
(Manitoba) Janet Harvey	0	1	1	0	1	0	1	0	4
(Manitoba) Briane Meilleur 🔨	2	0	0	1	0	2	0	1	6

Sheet 6	1	2	3	4	5	6	7	8	Final
(Manitoba) Chelsea Carey 🔨	0	2	1	0	2	0	2	X	7
(Nova Scotia) Heather Smith-Dacey	1	0	0	2	0	1	0	X	4

=== Draw 13 ===
October 23, 4:00 PM CT

Sheet 1	1	2	3	4	5	6	7	8	Final
(British Columbia) Kelly Scott 🔨	2	0	3	1	1	0	1	X	8
(Alberta) Desiree Owen	0	2	0	0	0	1	0	X	3

Sheet 2	1	2	3	4	5	6	7	8	Final
(Alberta) Renee Sonnenberg 🔨	0	4	0	1	3	X	X	X	8
(Alberta) Dana Ferguson	0	0	1	0	0	X	X	X	1

Sheet 3	1	2	3	4	5	6	7	8	Final
(Alberta) Valerie Sweeting	3	0	1	0	1	0	0	0	5
(Sweden) Margaretha Sigfridsson 🔨	0	3	0	1	0	1	0	1	6

Sheet 4	1	2	3	4	5	6	7	8	Final
(Alberta) Cheryl Bernard	0	2	3	0	1	0	2	X	8
(Ontario) Julie Hastings 🔨	0	0	0	2	0	3	0	X	5

Sheet 5	1	2	3	4	5	6	7	8	Final
(Alberta) Heather Nedohin 🔨	2	0	1	0	1	1	0	3	8
(Ontario) Rachel Homan	0	1	0	1	0	0	2	0	5

Sheet 6	1	2	3	4	5	6	7	8	Final
(Manitoba) Briane Milleur	0	0	1	0	0	X	X	X	1
(Saskatchewan) Amber Holland 🔨	2	1	0	1	3	X	X	X	7

=== Draw 14 ===
October 23, 7:30 PM CT

Sheet 1	1	2	3	4	5	6	7	8	Final
(Alberta) Renee Sonnenberg 🔨	2	0	1	0	3	0	0	1	7
(Alberta) Desiree Owen	0	1	0	1	0	1	2	0	5

Sheet 2	1	2	3	4	5	6	7	8	9	Final
(Sweden) Margaretha Sigfridsson	0	1	0	3	0	1	0	1	0	6
(Alberta) Cheryl Bernard 🔨	1	0	2	0	2	0	1	0	1	7

Sheet 3	1	2	3	4	5	6	7	8	Final
(Alberta) Heather Nedohin 🔨	0	3	0	0	0	1	1	X	5
(Saskatchewan) Amber Holland	1	0	1	0	1	0	0	X	3

Sheet 4	1	2	3	4	5	6	7	8	9	Final
(Manitoba) Chelsea Carey 🔨	0	0	0	1	0	1	0	1	0	3
(Manitoba) Cathy Overton-Clapham	0	0	0	0	2	0	1	0	1	4

== Playoffs ==
Quarterfinals
(Manitoba) Jennifer Jones	3
(Alberta) Cheryl Bernard	4
(British Columbia) Kelly Scott	7
(Alberta) Heather Nedohin	8
(Manitoba) Darcy Robertson	3
(Alberta) Renée Sonnenberg	5
(Saskatchewan) Stefanie Lawton	5
(Manitoba) Cathy Overton-Clapham	6

Semifinals
(Alberta) Cheryl Bernard	2
(Alberta) Heather Nedohin	6
(Alberta) Renée Sonnenberg	5
(Manitoba) Cathy Overton-Clapham	4

Finals
(Alberta) Heather Nedohin	7
(Alberta) Renée Sonnenberg	8

=== Quarterfinals ===
October 24, 10:00 AM CT

Sheet 1	1	2	3	4	5	6	7	8	Final
(Manitoba) Jennifer Jones	0	0	1	0	0	0	2	0	3
(Alberta) Cheryl Bernard 🔨	1	0	0	1	0	1	0	1	4

Sheet 2	1	2	3	4	5	6	7	8	Final
(British Columbia) Kelly Scott 🔨	2	0	2	0	1	0	2	0	7
(Alberta) Heather Nedohin	0	3	0	2	0	2	0	1	8

Sheet 3	1	2	3	4	5	6	7	8	Final
(Manitoba) Darcy Robertson	0	0	0	0	0	0	3	0	3
(Alberta) Renee Sonnenberg 🔨	0	1	0	0	1	2	0	1	5

Sheet 4	1	2	3	4	5	6	7	8	9	Final
(Saskatchewan) Stephanie Lawton	0	1	0	0	2	1	0	1	0	5
(Manitoba) Cathy Overton-Clapham 🔨	2	0	1	0	0	0	2	0	1	6

=== Semifinals ===
October 24, 1:30 PM CT

Sheet 1	1	2	3	4	5	6	7	8	Final
(Alberta) Cheryl Bernard	0	0	1	0	0	1	0	X	2
(Alberta) Heather Nedohin 🔨	0	1	0	1	2	0	2	X	6

Sheet 2	1	2	3	4	5	6	7	8	9	Final
(Alberta) Renee Sonnenberg	1	0	0	2	0	1	0	0	1	5
(Manitoba) Cathy Overton-Clapham 🔨	0	2	0	0	1	0	0	1	0	4

=== Final ===
October 24, 5:00 PM CT

Sheet 1	1	2	3	4	5	6	7	8	Final
(Alberta) Heather Nedohin	0	0	0	2	2	0	3	0	7
(Alberta) Renee Sonnenberg 🔨	0	3	2	0	0	2	0	1	8
