= 1997 Canadian Junior Curling Championships =

The 1997 Maple Leaf Foods Canadian Junior Curling Championships were held February 8-16 at the Selkirk Curling Club and Selkirk Arena in Selkirk, Manitoba.

== Men's ==
=== Teams ===
Province / Territory	Skip	Third	Second	Lead
Alberta	Scott Pfeifer	Ryan Keane (skip)	Blayne Iskiw	Peter Heck
British Columbia	TJ Perepolkin	Jeff Richard	Tyler Orme	Kevin Folk
Manitoba	Ryan Fry	Jim Bush	Jason Smith	Joel Gagnon
New Brunswick	Tommy Sullivan	Mark Dobson	Paul Dobson	Geoff Porter
Newfoundland	Randy Turpin	Jamie Korab	Chris Smyth	Joshua Yetman
Northern Ontario	Bryan Burgess	Joe Scharf	Robin Champagne	Mike Assad
Northwest Territories	Jamie Koe	Kevin Whitehead	Terry McDermid	Kevin Cymbalisty
Nova Scotia	Peter Eddy	Hugh Fidler	Andrew Gibson	Bryan Juurlink
Ontario	John Morris	Craig Savill	Matt St. Louis	Mark Homan
Prince Edward Island	Kyle Stevenson	Erik Broderson	Steven Barber	Chris Hodgson
Quebec	Philippe Lemay	Jean-Sebastien Roy	Jonathan Hubert	Christian Cantin
Saskatchewan	Cam Thompson	Ryan Miller	Kris Heron	Stuart Person
Yukon	Wyatt Redlin	Jason Nolan	Bryan Kowalyshen	Josh Clark

=== Standings ===
Locale	Skip	W	L
Alberta	Ryan Keane	10	2
Northwest Territories	Jamie Koe	8	4
British Columbia	TJ Perepolkin	7	5
Ontario	John Morris	7	5
New Brunswick	Tommy Sullivan	7	5
Yukon	Wyatt Redlin	7	5
Quebec	Philippe Lemay	7	5
Northern Ontario	Bryan Burgess	6	6
Nova Scotia	Peter Eddy	6	6
Prince Edward Island	Kyle Stevenson	4	8
Saskatchewan	Cam Thompson	4	8
Manitoba	Ryan Fry	3	9
Newfoundland	Randy Turpin	2	10

=== Results ===
==== Draw 1 ====
Sheet A	1	2	3	4	5	6	7	8	9	10	Final
Alberta (Keane) 🔨	1	0	0	0	0	1	0	2	0	2	6
British Columbia (Perepolkin)	0	2	0	0	2	0	0	0	1	0	5

Sheet C	1	2	3	4	5	6	7	8	9	10	Final
Yukon (Redlin) 🔨	1	0	2	0	0	1	1	0	0	0	5
Prince Edward Island (Stevenson)	0	0	0	1	1	0	0	1	0	1	4

Sheet E	1	2	3	4	5	6	7	8	9	10	Final
Northern Ontario (Burgess) 🔨	2	0	2	0	1	1	0	0	1	0	7
Newfoundland (Turpin)	0	1	0	0	0	0	1	1	0	0	3

Sheet G	1	2	3	4	5	6	7	8	9	10	Final
Nova Scotia (Eddy) 🔨	0	1	1	0	1	0	0	1	0	1	5
Northwest Territories (Koe)	1	0	0	1	0	0	0	0	1	0	3

==== Draw 2 ====
Sheet A	1	2	3	4	5	6	7	8	9	10	Final
Ontario (Morris) 🔨	2	1	0	0	0	0	1	0	0	0	4
Prince Edward Island (Stevenson)	0	0	0	0	1	0	0	1	1	0	3

Sheet C	1	2	3	4	5	6	7	8	9	10	Final
Saskatchewan (Thompson) 🔨	0	0	3	0	0	5	2	X	X	X	10
Quebec (Lemay)	0	0	0	0	2	0	0	X	X	X	2

Sheet E	1	2	3	4	5	6	7	8	9	10	Final
Manitoba (Fry) 🔨	1	0	0	2	0	0	0	3	0	X	6
Alberta (Keane)	0	1	0	0	0	1	0	0	1	X	3

Sheet G	1	2	3	4	5	6	7	8	9	10	Final
British Columbia (Perepolkin) 🔨	1	0	1	0	1	0	0	0	0	0	3
New Brunswick (Sullivan)	0	0	0	0	0	0	0	1	2	1	4

==== Draw 3 ====
Sheet A	1	2	3	4	5	6	7	8	9	10	Final
Newfoundland (Turpin) 🔨	0	2	1	3	2	0	0	0	0	0	8
Nova Scotia (Eddy)	1	0	0	0	0	1	3	1	0	1	7

Sheet C	1	2	3	4	5	6	7	8	9	10	Final
New Brunswick (Sullivan) 🔨	1	0	2	3	0	1	0	0	2	X	9
Manitoba (Fry)	0	1	0	0	2	0	1	1	0	X	5

Sheet E	1	2	3	4	5	6	7	8	9	10	11	Final
Quebec (Lemay) 🔨	1	0	0	0	0	1	0	1	0	2	1	6
Ontario (Morris)	0	0	0	1	1	0	2	0	1	0	0	5

Sheet G	1	2	3	4	5	6	7	8	9	10	Final
Northwest Territories (Koe) 🔨	1	0	0	0	0	2	0	0	1	X	4
Northern Ontario (Burgess)	0	2	0	0	1	0	3	1	0	X	7

==== Draw 4 ====
Sheet B	1	2	3	4	5	6	7	8	9	10	11	Final
Newfoundland (Turpin) 🔨	1	0	1	1	0	2	0	0	0	1	0	6
Yukon (Redlin)	0	1	0	0	1	0	3	0	1	0	1	7

Sheet D	1	2	3	4	5	6	7	8	9	10	Final
Prince Edward Island (Stevenson) 🔨	0	1	0	0	1	0	0	2	0	1	5
Saskatchewan (Thompson)	0	0	1	0	0	1	0	0	1	0	3

Sheet F	1	2	3	4	5	6	7	8	9	10	11	Final
Northern Ontario (Burgess) 🔨	0	0	0	0	2	0	0	1	0	1	0	4
Alberta (Keane)	0	0	1	1	0	1	0	0	1	0	1	5

Sheet H	1	2	3	4	5	6	7	8	9	10	Final
Ontario (Morris) 🔨	1	1	1	0	1	0	0	3	X	X	7
Manitoba (Fry)	0	0	0	1	0	1	0	0	X	X	2

==== Draw 5 ====
Sheet B	1	2	3	4	5	6	7	8	9	10	Final
Northwest Territories (Koe) 🔨	1	0	0	0	0	1	2	0	2	X	6
British Columbia (Perepolkin)	0	0	0	0	2	0	0	1	0	X	3

Sheet D	1	2	3	4	5	6	7	8	9	10	11	Final
New Brunswick (Sullivan) 🔨	1	0	1	0	1	0	2	0	1	0	1	7
Nova Scotia (Eddy)	0	0	0	1	0	0	0	2	0	3	0	6

Sheet F	1	2	3	4	5	6	7	8	9	10	Final
Yukon (Redlin) 🔨	1	1	1	0	2	0	0	1	1	X	7
Manitoba (Fry)	0	0	0	1	0	2	0	0	0	X	3

Sheet H	1	2	3	4	5	6	7	8	9	10	Final
Saskatchewan (Thompson) 🔨	0	0	3	0	2	0	2	0	1	X	8
Northern Ontario (Burgess)	0	0	0	2	0	1	0	2	0	X	5

==== Draw 6 ====
Sheet A	1	2	3	4	5	6	7	8	9	10	Final
Nova Scotia (Eddy) 🔨	0	2	0	0	1	0	1	1	0	X	5
Ontario (Morris)	0	0	0	0	0	1	0	0	1	X	2

Sheet C	1	2	3	4	5	6	7	8	9	10	Final
Alberta (Keane) 🔨	0	2	0	0	0	0	1	0	2	X	5
New Brunswick (Sullivan)	0	0	1	0	0	0	0	1	0	X	2

Sheet F	1	2	3	4	5	6	7	8	9	10	Final
Quebec (Lemay) 🔨	0	2	0	3	0	0	0	3	0	X	8
Northwest Territories (Koe)	0	0	2	0	2	1	0	0	1	X	6

Sheet H	1	2	3	4	5	6	7	8	9	10	Final
British Columbia (Perepolkin) 🔨	1	0	0	2	0	2	0	2	X	X	7
Newfoundland (Turpin)	0	0	1	0	1	0	1	0	X	X	3

==== Draw 7 ====
Sheet A	1	2	3	4	5	6	7	8	9	10	11	Final
British Columbia (Perepolkin) 🔨	2	0	3	0	0	0	0	0	1	0	2	8
Quebec (Lemay)	0	1	0	0	2	1	0	0	0	2	0	6

Sheet D	1	2	3	4	5	6	7	8	9	10	Final
Alberta (Keane) 🔨	1	0	1	0	2	1	1	3	X	X	9
Yukon (Redlin)	0	1	0	2	0	0	0	0	X	X	3

Sheet F	1	2	3	4	5	6	7	8	9	10	Final
Newfoundland (Turpin) 🔨	0	0	0	1	0	2	0	0	1	X	4
New Brunswick (Sullivan)	0	0	0	0	1	0	4	1	0	X	6

Sheet H	1	2	3	4	5	6	7	8	9	10	Final
Northwest Territories (Koe) 🔨	1	0	0	0	1	0	1	2	3	X	8
Prince Edward Island (Stevenson)	0	2	1	0	0	0	0	0	0	X	3

==== Draw 8 ====
Sheet B	1	2	3	4	5	6	7	8	9	10	Final
Prince Edward Island (Stevenson) 🔨	0	0	0	0	0	X	X	X	X	X	0
Alberta (Keane)	1	2	1	2	3	X	X	X	X	X	9

Sheet C	1	2	3	4	5	6	7	8	9	10	Final
Quebec (Lemay) 🔨	1	0	1	0	0	1	0	1	0	0	4
Yukon (Redlin)	0	1	0	2	0	0	1	0	0	1	5

Sheet E	1	2	3	4	5	6	7	8	9	10	Final
Northern Ontario (Burgess) 🔨	0	0	2	0	1	2	0	3	X	X	8
Nova Scotia (Eddy)	0	1	0	1	0	0	0	0	X	X	2

Sheet G	1	2	3	4	5	6	7	8	9	10	Final
Manitoba (Fry) 🔨	0	1	0	0	0	0	1	0	0	X	2
Saskatchewan (Thompson)	0	0	0	3	1	0	0	0	1	X	5

==== Draw 9 ====
Sheet B	1	2	3	4	5	6	7	8	9	10	Final
Saskatchewan (Thompson) 🔨	0	0	0	2	0	1	0	0	X	X	3
Nova Scotia (Eddy)	0	2	0	0	2	0	3	2	X	X	9

Sheet C	1	2	3	4	5	6	7	8	9	10	Final
Manitoba (Fry) 🔨	1	0	0	0	0	1	1	0	1	0	4
Newfoundland and Labrador (Turpin)	0	0	1	0	1	0	0	2	0	1	5

Sheet F	1	2	3	4	5	6	7	8	9	10	Final
Ontario (Morris) 🔨	1	0	1	0	0	0	1	0	1	0	4
British Columbia (Perepolkin)	0	1	0	0	0	2	0	0	0	2	5

Sheet G	1	2	3	4	5	6	7	8	9	10	Final
New Brunswick (Sullivan) 🔨	1	0	0	0	1	0	2	0	0	1	5
Northern Ontario (Burgess)	0	0	0	2	0	2	0	1	1	0	6

==== Draw 10 ====
Sheet B	1	2	3	4	5	6	7	8	9	10	Final
Northern Ontario (Burgess) 🔨	1	0	1	0	0	2	0	0	1	0	5
Quebec (Lemay)	0	0	0	2	1	0	3	0	0	1	7

Sheet D	1	2	3	4	5	6	7	8	9	10	Final
British Columbia (Perepolkin) 🔨	2	0	1	0	0	2	0	2	X	X	7
Manitoba (Fry)	0	0	0	1	0	0	1	0	X	X	2

Sheet E	1	2	3	4	5	6	7	8	9	10	11	Final
Alberta (Keane) 🔨	0	2	2	0	0	0	0	1	0	0	0	5
Northwest Territories (Koe)	0	0	0	1	2	0	0	0	1	1	1	6

Sheet H	1	2	3	4	5	6	7	8	9	10	Final
Yukon (Redlin) 🔨	1	0	1	0	0	2	0	2	0	X	6
New Brunswick (Sullivan)	0	0	0	3	0	0	2	0	3	X	8

==== Draw 11 ====
Sheet A	1	2	3	4	5	6	7	8	9	10	Final
Prince Edward Island (Stevenson) 🔨	2	0	0	1	1	0	1	0	2	X	7
Newfoundland (Turpin)	0	1	1	0	0	1	0	2	0	X	5

Sheet C	1	2	3	4	5	6	7	8	9	10	Final
Yukon (Redlin) 🔨	1	0	0	0	0	1	1	2	0	X	5
British Columbia (Perepolkin)	0	0	1	0	0	0	0	0	2	X	3

Sheet E	1	2	3	4	5	6	7	8	9	10	Final
Ontario (Morris) 🔨	0	3	0	0	0	1	0	1	0	1	6
Saskatchewan (Thompson)	0	0	2	1	0	0	0	0	1	0	4

Sheet H	1	2	3	4	5	6	7	8	9	10	Final
Nova Scotia (Eddy) 🔨	0	1	0	0	0	2	1	2	0	X	6
Quebec (Lemay)	0	0	0	1	3	0	0	0	0	X	4

==== Draw 12 ====
Sheet A	1	2	3	4	5	6	7	8	9	10	Final
Manitoba (Fry) 🔨	2	0	0	2	0	2	0	0	0	X	6
Northern Ontario (Burgess)	0	1	0	0	2	0	0	1	0	X	4

Sheet D	1	2	3	4	5	6	7	8	9	10	Final
Saskatchewan (Thompson) 🔨	1	1	0	1	0	1	0	3	0	1	8
Newfoundland (Turpin)	0	0	1	0	2	0	1	0	2	0	6

Sheet E	1	2	3	4	5	6	7	8	9	10	Final
New Brunswick (Sullivan) 🔨	0	0	1	3	2	0	1	1	X	X	8
Prince Edward Island (Stevenson)	0	0	0	0	0	1	0	0	X	X	1

Sheet G	1	2	3	4	5	6	7	8	9	10	Final
Northwest Territories (Koe) 🔨	0	0	0	1	0	0	0	1	0	X	2
Ontario (Morris)	1	0	1	0	0	0	1	0	3	X	6

==== Draw 13 ====
Sheet B	1	2	3	4	5	6	7	8	9	10	Final
Ontario (Morris) 🔨	1	1	0	1	1	1	0	0	0	X	5
New Brunswick (Sullivan)	0	0	1	0	0	0	1	0	0	X	2

Sheet D	1	2	3	4	5	6	7	8	9	10	11	Final
Manitoba (Fry) 🔨	0	1	1	0	2	0	1	0	0	1	0	6
Northwest Territories (Koe)	1	0	0	2	0	1	0	2	0	0	1	7

Sheet E	1	2	3	4	5	6	7	8	9	10	Final
British Columbia (Perepolkin) 🔨	1	1	1	2	1	1	0	0	X	X	7
Nova Scotia (Eddy)	0	0	0	0	0	0	0	1	X	X	1

Sheet G	1	2	3	4	5	6	7	8	9	10	Final
Newfoundland (Turpin) 🔨	0	2	0	0	0	1	0	0	X	X	3
Alberta (Keane)	2	0	1	2	1	0	0	3	X	X	9

==== Draw 14 ====
Sheet A	1	2	3	4	5	6	7	8	9	10	11	Final
Saskatchewan (Thompson) 🔨	1	0	0	2	0	0	0	0	0	1	0	4
Yukon (Redlin)	0	0	3	0	1	0	0	0	0	0	1	5

Sheet C	1	2	3	4	5	6	7	8	9	10	Final
Nova Scotia (Eddy) 🔨	1	0	0	0	2	0	1	0	1	0	5
Alberta (Keane)	0	0	2	0	0	1	0	3	0	1	7

Sheet F	1	2	3	4	5	6	7	8	9	10	11	12	13	Final
British Columbia (Perepolkin) 🔨	0	3	0	0	0	0	0	0	2	1	0	0	0	6
Northern Ontario (Burgess)	0	0	0	3	1	0	0	2	0	0	0	0	1	7

Sheet G	1	2	3	4	5	6	7	8	9	10	Final
Quebec (Lemay) 🔨	2	0	3	1	2	0	0	3	X	X	11
Prince Edward Island (Stevenson)	0	1	0	0	0	1	1	0	X	X	3

==== Draw 15 ====
Sheet A	1	2	3	4	5	6	7	8	9	10	Final
Quebec (Lemay) 🔨	1	1	0	1	0	0	0	3	0	X	6
New Brunswick (Sullivan)	0	0	0	0	1	0	0	0	1	X	2

Sheet D	1	2	3	4	5	6	7	8	9	10	Final
Northwest Territories (Koe) 🔨	1	0	1	1	0	0	2	0	2	X	7
Saskatchewan (Thompson)	0	1	0	0	0	1	0	1	0	X	3

Sheet E	1	2	3	4	5	6	7	8	9	10	Final
Prince Edward Island (Stevenson) 🔨	0	1	0	0	0	0	3	1	0	0	5
Manitoba (Fry)	1	0	0	1	1	1	0	0	2	1	7

Sheet G	1	2	3	4	5	6	7	8	9	10	Final
Ontario (Morris) 🔨	0	0	0	3	2	0	3	0	X	X	8
Yukon (Redlin)	0	0	1	0	0	2	0	1	X	X	4

==== Draw 16 ====
Sheet B	1	2	3	4	5	6	7	8	9	10	11	Final
Nova Scotia (Eddy) 🔨	1	0	2	0	2	0	0	0	0	2	1	8
Manitoba (Fry)	0	1	0	1	0	1	3	1	0	0	0	7

Sheet D	1	2	3	4	5	6	7	8	9	10	Final
Newfoundland (Turpin) 🔨	0	2	0	0	0	0	0	1	0	X	3
Quebec (Lemay)	1	0	2	1	0	0	2	0	3	X	9

Sheet F	1	2	3	4	5	6	7	8	9	10	Final
Alberta (Keane) 🔨	2	0	0	0	2	1	0	0	0	3	8
Ontario (Morris)	0	3	2	1	0	0	0	1	0	0	7

Sheet G	1	2	3	4	5	6	7	8	9	10	Final
Saskatchewan (Thompson) 🔨	0	2	0	1	0	0	1	0	0	X	4
British Columbia (Perepolkin)	2	0	3	0	0	1	0	2	0	X	8

==== Draw 17 ====
Sheet B	1	2	3	4	5	6	7	8	9	10	11	Final
Yukon (Redlin) 🔨	0	0	1	0	0	0	3	1	0	0	0	5
Northwest Territories (Koe)	1	0	0	1	1	0	0	0	1	1	1	6

Sheet D	1	2	3	4	5	6	7	8	9	10	Final
Northern Ontario (Burgess) 🔨	0	1	1	0	1	0	3	0	0	0	6
Prince Edward Island (Stevenson)	5	0	0	1	0	1	0	0	1	1	9

==== Draw 18 ====
Sheet A	1	2	3	4	5	6	7	8	9	10	Final
New Brunswick (Sullivan) 🔨	1	0	1	0	0	0	0	1	0	X	3
Northwest Territories (Koe)	0	2	0	0	1	0	1	0	1	X	5

Sheet C	1	2	3	4	5	6	7	8	9	10	Final
Prince Edward Island (Stevenson) 🔨	0	0	1	0	0	4	0	1	0	1	7
Nova Scotia (Eddy)	0	0	0	2	0	0	3	0	1	0	6

Sheet E	1	2	3	4	5	6	7	8	9	10	Final
Newfoundland (Turpin) 🔨	1	0	1	0	2	0	0	0	2	0	6
Ontario (Morris)	0	2	0	2	0	0	1	1	0	1	7

Sheet H	1	2	3	4	5	6	7	8	9	10	Final
Alberta (Keane) 🔨	0	2	0	1	0	0	1	0	0	1	5
Saskatchewan (Thompson)	0	0	0	0	1	0	0	0	2	0	3

==== Draw 19 ====
Sheet B	1	2	3	4	5	6	7	8	9	10	Final
Prince Edward Island (Stevenson) 🔨	0	0	0	0	1	0	2	0	1	0	4
British Columbia (Perepolkin)	0	0	0	0	0	1	0	2	0	3	6

Sheet C	1	2	3	4	5	6	7	8	9	10	Final
Northwest Territories (Koe) 🔨	3	0	2	0	0	0	1	0	0	X	6
Newfoundland (Turpin)	0	1	0	1	0	0	0	0	1	X	3

Sheet F	1	2	3	4	5	6	7	8	9	10	Final
Manitoba (Fry) 🔨	0	1	0	2	0	1	0	0	X	X	4
Quebec (Lemay)	1	0	4	0	0	0	2	3	X	X	10

Sheet H	1	2	3	4	5	6	7	8	9	10	Final
Yukon (Redlin) 🔨	0	0	0	3	0	1	0	2	0	1	7
Northern Ontario (Burgess)	1	0	0	0	1	0	2	0	1	0	5

==== Draw 20 ====
Sheet A	1	2	3	4	5	6	7	8	9	10	11	Final
Northern Ontario (Burgess) 🔨	1	0	0	0	1	0	0	2	1	0	1	6
Ontario (Morris)	0	1	0	0	0	0	1	0	0	3	0	5

Sheet D	1	2	3	4	5	6	7	8	9	10	Final
Quebec (Lemay) 🔨	1	0	1	0	0	1	0	0	0	X	3
Alberta (Keane)	0	2	0	0	2	0	0	0	2	X	6

Sheet F	1	2	3	4	5	6	7	8	9	10	Final
Nova Scotia (Eddy) 🔨	0	2	0	3	0	2	0	2	0	X	9
Yukon (Redlin)	0	0	1	0	2	0	1	0	0	X	4

Sheet H	1	2	3	4	5	6	7	8	9	10	Final
New Brunswick (Sullivan) 🔨	0	1	0	0	0	3	0	0	2	X	6
Saskatchewan (Thompson)	0	0	2	0	0	0	1	1	0	X	4

=== Tiebreakers ===
==== Tiebreaker #1 ====
Sheet G	1	2	3	4	5	6	7	8	9	10	Final
Quebec (Lemay)	0	0	0	2	0	2	0	0	0	X	4
Yukon (Redlin) 🔨	1	1	1	0	2	0	1	1	1	X	8

Player percentages
Quebec		Yukon	
Christian Cantin	86%	Josh Clark	60%
Jonathan Hubert	76%	Bryan Kowalyshen	80%
Jean-Sebastien Roy	78%	Jason Nolan	84%
Philippe Lemay	54%	Wyatt Redlin	79%
Total	74%	Total	76%

==== Tiebreaker #2 ====
Sheet E	1	2	3	4	5	6	7	8	9	10	Final
New Brunswick (Sullivan) 🔨	0	1	1	2	0	2	0	0	0	1	7
Yukon (Redlin)	0	0	0	0	2	0	1	3	0	0	6

Player percentages
New Brunswick		Yukon	
Geoff Porter	86%	Josh Clark	88%
Paul Dobson	79%	Bryan Kowalyshen	76%
Mark Dobson	78%	Jason Nolan	83%
Tommy Sullivan	71%	Wyatt Redlin	69%
Total	78%	Total	79%

Sheet G	1	2	3	4	5	6	7	8	9	10	11	12	Final
British Columbia (Perepolkin) 🔨	0	0	2	0	0	2	1	0	0	2	0	0	7
Ontario (Morris)	1	0	0	1	1	0	0	1	3	0	0	1	8

Player percentages
British Columbia		Ontario	
Kevin Folk	78%	Mark Homan	81%
Tyler Orme	82%	Matt St. Louis	74%
Jeff Richard	73%	Craig Savill	76%
TJ Perepolkin	79%	John Morris	66%
Total	78%	Total	74%

==== Tiebreaker #3 ====
Sheet F	1	2	3	4	5	6	7	8	9	10	11	Final
Ontario (Morris) 🔨	0	0	1	1	0	0	0	1	1	0	2	6
New Brunswick (Sullivan)	0	0	0	0	1	0	1	0	0	2	0	4

Player percentages
Ontario		New Brunswick	
Mark Homan	80%	Geoff Porter	85%
Matt St. Louis	78%	Paul Dobson	77%
Craig Savill	75%	Mark Dobson	82%
John Morris	95%	Tommy Sullivan	83%
Total	82%	Total	82%

=== Playoffs ===
==== Semifinal ====
Sheet A	1	2	3	4	5	6	7	8	9	10	Final
Ontario (Morris) 🔨	0	0	1	0	2	0	1	1	0	2	7
Northwest Territories (Koe)	0	1	0	2	0	1	0	0	2	0	6

Player percentages
Ontario		Northwest Territories	
Mark Homan	71%	Kevin Cymbalisty	85%
Matt St. Louis	85%	Terry McDermid	80%
Craig Savill	81%	Kevin Whitehead	90%
John Morris	90%	Jamie Koe	78%
Total	82%	Total	83%

==== Final ====
Sheet C	1	2	3	4	5	6	7	8	9	10	11	Final
Ontario (Morris)	0	0	1	0	1	0	2	0	0	1	0	5
Alberta (Keane) 🔨	1	0	0	1	0	2	0	0	1	0	1	6

Player percentages
Ontario		Alberta	
Mark Homan	78%	Peter Heck	71%
Matt St. Louis	84%	Blayne Iskiw	73%
Craig Savill	78%	Ryan Keane	88%
John Morris	77%	Scott Pfeifer	71%
Total	80%	Total	76%

== Women's ==
=== Teams ===
Province / Territory	Skip	Third	Second	Lead
Alberta	Kristie Moore	Lori Olson	Lesley Ewoniak	Diane Lee
British Columbia	Julie Provost	Lindsay Kostenuik	Michelle Blacker	Nadine Favreau
Manitoba	Megan Adams	Shawna Trush	Cara Walz	Kyla Denisuik
New Brunswick	Melissa McClure	Nancy Toner	Brigitte McClure	Bethany Toner
Newfoundland	Heather Strong	Kim Bourque	Krista Normore	Laura Strong
Northern Ontario	Elaine Uhryn	Kari MacLean	Kelli Smith	Amy Stachiw
Northwest Territories	Trina White	Krista Vivian	Jill Kelln	Tasha Riffel
Nova Scotia	Meredith Doyle	Beth Roach	Tara Hamer	Candice MacLean
Ontario	Sara Garland	Katrina Sale	Kristin Turko	Lindsay Turko
Prince Edward Island	Pam Burke	Lisa MacRae	Colleen McCabe	Jenniffer Arbing
Quebec	Marie-France Larouche	Nancy Belanger	Marie-Eve Letourneau	Valérie Grenier
Saskatchewan	Stefanie Miller	Marliese Miller	Stacy Helm	Kristin Regnier
Yukon	Tracy Bekenes	Kara Kowalyshen	Lindsay Moffatt	Tia-Jayne Clark

=== Standings ===
Locale	Skip	W	L
Quebec	Marie-France Larouche	10	2
Nova Scotia	Meredith Doyle	9	3
Saskatchewan	Stefanie Miller	8	4
Northern Ontario	Elaine Uhryn	8	4
Ontario	Sara Garland	7	5
New Brunswick	Melissa McClure	7	5
Manitoba	Megan Adams	6	6
Yukon	Tracy Bekenes	5	7
Newfoundland	Heather Strong	5	7
Prince Edward Island	Pam Burke	4	8
British Columbia	Julie Provost	3	9
Alberta	Kristie Moore	3	9
Northwest Territories	Trina White	3	9

=== Results ===
==== Draw 1 ====
Sheet B	1	2	3	4	5	6	7	8	9	10	Final
Alberta (Moore) 🔨	1	0	2	1	1	0	0	2	0	0	7
British Columbia (Provost)	0	3	0	0	0	1	2	0	1	1	8

Sheet D	1	2	3	4	5	6	7	8	9	10	Final
Yukon (Bekenes) 🔨	0	0	1	1	1	0	1	2	3	X	9
Prince Edward Island (Burke)	1	0	0	0	0	0	0	0	0	X	1

Sheet F	1	2	3	4	5	6	7	8	9	10	Final
Northern Ontario (Uhryn) 🔨	0	1	0	1	0	1	0	0	2	0	5
Newfoundland (Strong)	0	0	1	0	1	0	1	0	0	1	4

Sheet H	1	2	3	4	5	6	7	8	9	10	Final
Nova Scotia (Doyle) 🔨	0	1	0	0	2	1	2	1	0	4	11
Northwest Territories (White)	0	0	1	2	0	0	0	0	1	0	4

==== Draw 2 ====
Sheet B	1	2	3	4	5	6	7	8	9	10	Final
Ontario (Garland) 🔨	3	0	2	2	0	3	0	2	X	X	12
Prince Edward Island (Burke)	0	1	0	0	3	0	1	0	X	X	5

Sheet D	1	2	3	4	5	6	7	8	9	10	Final
Saskatchewan (Miller) 🔨	1	0	1	0	0	0	1	0	0	X	3
Quebec (Larouche)	0	2	0	1	3	1	0	1	1	X	9

Sheet F	1	2	3	4	5	6	7	8	9	10	11	Final
Manitoba (Adams) 🔨	2	0	0	0	3	0	0	2	0	1	0	8
Alberta (Moore)	0	0	2	1	0	1	2	0	2	0	1	9

Sheet H	1	2	3	4	5	6	7	8	9	10	11	Final
British Columbia (Provost) 🔨	0	0	1	1	0	0	1	0	0	2	0	5
New Brunswick (McClure)	0	0	0	0	0	1	0	3	1	0	1	6

==== Draw 3 ====
Sheet B	1	2	3	4	5	6	7	8	9	10	Final
Newfoundland (Strong) 🔨	0	0	0	0	0	0	1	X	X	X	1
Nova Scotia (Doyle)	1	0	3	2	4	1	0	X	X	X	11

Sheet D	1	2	3	4	5	6	7	8	9	10	Final
New Brunswick (McClure) 🔨	0	0	1	0	0	2	0	2	0	X	5
Manitoba (Adams)	2	1	0	1	2	0	2	0	1	X	9

Sheet F	1	2	3	4	5	6	7	8	9	10	Final
Quebec (Larouche) 🔨	1	0	0	2	0	0	2	1	0	1	7
Ontario (Garland)	0	1	0	0	2	1	0	0	0	0	4

Sheet H	1	2	3	4	5	6	7	8	9	10	Final
Northwest Territories (White) 🔨	2	0	0	4	3	0	0	0	1	1	11
Northern Ontario (Uhryn)	0	2	1	0	0	3	2	1	0	0	9

==== Draw 4 ====
Sheet A	1	2	3	4	5	6	7	8	9	10	Final
Newfoundland (Strong) 🔨	0	2	0	0	0	1	2	0	0	1	6
Yukon (Bekenes)	1	0	2	1	0	0	0	0	3	0	7

Sheet C	1	2	3	4	5	6	7	8	9	10	Final
Prince Edward Island (Burke) 🔨	0	0	2	0	1	0	0	X	X	X	3
Saskatchewan (Miller)	3	1	0	2	0	2	3	X	X	X	11

Sheet E	1	2	3	4	5	6	7	8	9	10	Final
Northern Ontario (Uhryn) 🔨	0	3	0	0	2	0	1	1	1	1	9
Alberta (Moore)	2	0	2	2	0	1	0	0	0	0	7

Sheet G	1	2	3	4	5	6	7	8	9	10	Final
Ontario (Garland) 🔨	0	1	0	1	0	0	0	1	0	X	3
Manitoba (Adams)	1	0	1	0	1	2	1	0	1	X	7

==== Draw 5 ====
Sheet A	1	2	3	4	5	6	7	8	9	10	Final
Northwest Territories (White) 🔨	1	0	0	1	0	3	0	0	0	X	5
British Columbia (Provost)	0	1	1	0	2	0	1	1	2	X	8

Sheet C	1	2	3	4	5	6	7	8	9	10	Final
New Brunswick (McClure) 🔨	3	0	0	1	0	2	1	0	2	X	9
Nova Scotia (Doyle)	0	0	1	0	1	0	0	2	0	X	4

Sheet E	1	2	3	4	5	6	7	8	9	10	Final
Yukon (Bekenes) 🔨	2	2	0	2	1	0	3	X	X	X	10
Manitoba (Adams)	0	0	1	0	0	2	0	X	X	X	3

Sheet G	1	2	3	4	5	6	7	8	9	10	Final
Saskatchewan (Miller) 🔨	0	1	0	5	0	0	0	2	1	X	9
Northern Ontario (Uhryn)	0	0	2	0	2	1	1	0	0	X	6

==== Draw 6 ====
Sheet B	1	2	3	4	5	6	7	8	9	10	11	12	Final
Nova Scotia (Doyle) 🔨	1	1	0	1	0	1	0	1	0	1	0	1	7
Ontario (Garland)	0	0	0	0	3	0	1	0	2	0	0	0	6

Sheet D	1	2	3	4	5	6	7	8	9	10	11	Final
Alberta (Moore) 🔨	1	0	0	3	0	0	1	0	0	1	0	6
New Brunswick (McClure)	0	0	2	0	1	1	0	1	1	0	2	8

Sheet E	1	2	3	4	5	6	7	8	9	10	Final
Quebec (Larouche) 🔨	1	0	0	2	1	1	1	2	X	X	8
Northwest Territories (White)	0	0	1	0	0	0	0	0	X	X	1

Sheet G	1	2	3	4	5	6	7	8	9	10	Final
British Columbia (Provost) 🔨	1	1	0	1	0	2	0	1	0	0	6
Newfoundland (Strong)	0	0	1	0	2	0	3	0	0	1	7

==== Draw 7 ====
Sheet B	1	2	3	4	5	6	7	8	9	10	Final
British Columbia (Provost) 🔨	0	1	0	1	0	0	1	0	1	X	4
Quebec (Larouche)	0	0	2	0	2	2	0	2	0	X	8

Sheet C	1	2	3	4	5	6	7	8	9	10	Final
Alberta (Moore) 🔨	0	0	0	1	1	0	2	0	1	X	5
Yukon (Bekenes)	1	2	1	0	0	3	0	2	0	X	9

Sheet E	1	2	3	4	5	6	7	8	9	10	Final
Newfoundland (Strong) 🔨	1	0	1	0	2	0	2	0	0	0	6
New Brunswick (McClure)	0	1	0	2	0	2	0	1	1	1	8

Sheet G	1	2	3	4	5	6	7	8	9	10	Final
Northwest Territories (White) 🔨	2	0	0	0	0	0	1	1	1	X	5
Prince Edward Island (Burke)	0	3	0	2	0	2	0	0	0	X	7

==== Draw 8 ====
Sheet A	1	2	3	4	5	6	7	8	9	10	Final
Prince Edward Island (Burke) 🔨	1	0	3	0	2	0	2	0	1	X	9
Alberta (Moore)	0	2	0	2	0	1	0	1	0	X	6

Sheet D	1	2	3	4	5	6	7	8	9	10	Final
Quebec (Larouche) 🔨	1	0	3	0	2	1	0	0	1	X	8
Yukon (Bekenes)	0	1	0	1	0	0	1	1	0	X	4

Sheet F	1	2	3	4	5	6	7	8	9	10	Final
Northern Ontario (Uhryn) 🔨	1	0	1	1	0	3	0	2	X	X	8
Nova Scotia (Doyle)	0	1	0	0	1	0	1	0	X	X	3

Sheet H	1	2	3	4	5	6	7	8	9	10	Final
Manitoba (Adams) 🔨	0	0	0	0	0	0	X	X	X	X	0
Saskatchewan (Miller)	1	1	1	1	2	3	X	X	X	X	9

==== Draw 9 ====
Sheet A	1	2	3	4	5	6	7	8	9	10	Final
Saskatchewan (Miller) 🔨	1	0	1	0	1	0	0	0	2	0	5
Nova Scotia (Doyle)	0	1	0	2	0	0	1	1	0	1	6

Sheet D	1	2	3	4	5	6	7	8	9	10	Final
Manitoba (Adams) 🔨	2	1	0	1	0	0	0	3	1	X	8
Newfoundland (Strong)	0	0	1	0	3	1	1	0	0	X	6

Sheet E	1	2	3	4	5	6	7	8	9	10	Final
Ontario (Garland) 🔨	2	0	1	1	0	1	1	0	2	X	8
British Columbia (Provost)	0	1	0	0	2	0	0	1	0	X	4

Sheet H	1	2	3	4	5	6	7	8	9	10	Final
New Brunswick (McClure) 🔨	0	1	0	0	1	0	0	1	1	0	4
Northern Ontario (Uhryn)	0	0	2	0	0	1	0	0	0	2	5

==== Draw 10 ====
Sheet A	1	2	3	4	5	6	7	8	9	10	Final
Northern Ontario (Uhryn) 🔨	1	0	1	0	0	0	X	X	X	X	2
Quebec (Larouche)	0	3	0	3	3	2	X	X	X	X	11

Sheet C	1	2	3	4	5	6	7	8	9	10	Final
British Columbia (Provost) 🔨	0	1	0	0	0	0	1	0	X	X	2
Manitoba (Adams)	0	0	0	3	2	2	0	2	X	X	9

Sheet F	1	2	3	4	5	6	7	8	9	10	Final
Alberta (Moore) 🔨	1	0	0	0	1	0	0	1	0	1	4
Northwest Territories (White)	0	0	1	0	0	0	0	0	1	0	2

Sheet G	1	2	3	4	5	6	7	8	9	10	Final
Yukon (Bekenes) 🔨	0	1	0	0	0	1	0	X	X	X	2
New Brunswick (McClure)	3	0	1	1	2	0	2	X	X	X	9

==== Draw 11 ====
Sheet B	1	2	3	4	5	6	7	8	9	10	Final
Prince Edward Island (Burke) 🔨	0	1	0	0	3	0	0	1	1	0	6
Newfoundland (Strong)	1	0	1	2	0	0	1	0	0	2	7

Sheet D	1	2	3	4	5	6	7	8	9	10	Final
Yukon (Bekenes) 🔨	1	1	0	1	0	0	1	0	2	X	6
British Columbia (Provost)	0	0	2	0	1	0	0	1	0	X	4

Sheet F	1	2	3	4	5	6	7	8	9	10	Final
Ontario (Garland) 🔨	0	4	0	2	0	0	4	3	X	X	13
Saskatchewan (Miller)	0	0	1	0	1	0	0	0	X	X	2

Sheet G	1	2	3	4	5	6	7	8	9	10	Final
Nova Scotia (Doyle) 🔨	1	0	0	1	0	1	2	0	1	0	6
Quebec (Larouche)	0	1	0	0	1	0	0	2	0	1	5

==== Draw 12 ====
Sheet B	1	2	3	4	5	6	7	8	9	10	Final
Manitoba (Adams) 🔨	1	2	0	0	1	0	0	3	1	1	9
Northern Ontario (Uhryn)	0	0	3	0	0	2	2	0	0	0	7

Sheet C	1	2	3	4	5	6	7	8	9	10	Final
Saskatchewan (Miller) 🔨	2	0	0	0	1	0	0	1	1	0	5
Newfoundland (Strong)	0	2	0	0	0	1	0	0	0	1	4

Sheet F	1	2	3	4	5	6	7	8	9	10	11	Final
New Brunswick (McClure) 🔨	2	2	0	0	0	1	0	0	0	0	0	5
Prince Edward Island (Burke)	0	0	1	1	1	0	0	1	0	1	1	6

Sheet H	1	2	3	4	5	6	7	8	9	10	Final
Northwest Territories (White) 🔨	1	0	1	0	0	0	1	0	X	X	3
Ontario (Garland)	0	3	0	1	0	2	0	4	X	X	10

==== Draw 13 ====
Sheet A	1	2	3	4	5	6	7	8	9	10	Final
Ontario (Garland) 🔨	1	1	0	1	2	1	0	2	0	X	8
New Brunswick (McClure)	0	0	1	0	0	0	2	0	1	X	4

Sheet C	1	2	3	4	5	6	7	8	9	10	Final
Manitoba (Adams) 🔨	0	0	1	0	1	0	0	1	0	1	4
Northwest Territories (White)	0	0	0	1	0	1	2	0	1	0	5

Sheet F	1	2	3	4	5	6	7	8	9	10	Final
British Columbia (Provost) 🔨	2	0	0	3	2	1	0	1	X	X	9
Nova Scotia (Doyle)	0	0	2	0	0	0	1	0	X	X	3

Sheet H	1	2	3	4	5	6	7	8	9	10	Final
Newfoundland (Strong) 🔨	0	1	0	0	0	2	0	1	1	X	5
Alberta (Moore)	0	0	1	0	0	0	1	0	0	X	2

==== Draw 14 ====
Sheet B	1	2	3	4	5	6	7	8	9	10	Final
Saskatchewan (Miller) 🔨	2	0	0	0	0	3	0	1	0	2	8
Yukon (Bekenes)	0	0	1	0	1	0	1	0	2	0	5

Sheet D	1	2	3	4	5	6	7	8	9	10	Final
Nova Scotia (Doyle) 🔨	0	1	0	2	0	1	1	2	2	X	9
Alberta (Moore)	0	0	2	0	1	0	0	0	0	X	3

Sheet E	1	2	3	4	5	6	7	8	9	10	Final
British Columbia (Provost) 🔨	0	0	0	1	0	1	0	2	0	X	4
Northern Ontario (Uhryn)	1	1	0	0	3	0	2	0	2	X	9

Sheet H	1	2	3	4	5	6	7	8	9	10	Final
Quebec (Larouche) 🔨	0	2	0	1	1	0	0	0	0	1	5
Prince Edward Island (Burke)	1	0	1	0	0	0	2	0	0	0	4

==== Draw 15 ====
Sheet B	1	2	3	4	5	6	7	8	9	10	Final
Quebec (Larouche) 🔨	0	0	0	0	4	0	0	1	0	1	6
New Brunswick (McClure)	0	0	1	1	0	1	1	0	1	0	5

Sheet C	1	2	3	4	5	6	7	8	9	10	Final
Northwest Territories (White) 🔨	0	0	3	1	1	0	0	0	1	X	6
Saskatchewan (Miller)	2	1	0	0	0	2	1	1	0	X	7

Sheet F	1	2	3	4	5	6	7	8	9	10	Final
Prince Edward Island (Burke) 🔨	0	0	0	0	2	1	0	3	0	0	6
Manitoba (Adams)	1	1	1	1	0	0	1	0	1	3	9

Sheet H	1	2	3	4	5	6	7	8	9	10	Final
Ontario (Garland) 🔨	1	0	2	1	0	3	X	X	X	X	7
Yukon (Bekenes)	0	1	0	0	1	0	X	X	X	X	2

==== Draw 16 ====
Sheet A	1	2	3	4	5	6	7	8	9	10	Final
Nova Scotia (Doyle) 🔨	2	0	0	1	0	2	1	0	1	2	9
Manitoba (Adams)	0	0	1	0	1	0	0	2	0	0	4

Sheet C	1	2	3	4	5	6	7	8	9	10	Final
Newfoundland (Strong) 🔨	1	0	0	1	0	0	0	0	1	X	3
Quebec (Larouche)	0	2	0	0	0	1	1	3	0	X	7

Sheet E	1	2	3	4	5	6	7	8	9	10	Final
Alberta (Moore) 🔨	0	1	0	0	0	2	1	0	1	X	5
Ontario (Garland)	0	0	2	1	1	0	0	2	0	X	6

Sheet H	1	2	3	4	5	6	7	8	9	10	Final
Saskatchewan (Miller) 🔨	0	2	0	0	1	1	0	1	0	2	7
British Columbia (Provost)	1	0	1	1	0	0	2	0	0	0	5

==== Draw 17 ====
Sheet A	1	2	3	4	5	6	7	8	9	10	Final
Yukon (Bekenes) 🔨	1	0	0	0	0	0	X	X	X	X	1
Northwest Territories (White)	0	3	1	1	1	2	X	X	X	X	8

Sheet C	1	2	3	4	5	6	7	8	9	10	Final
Northern Ontario (Uhryn) 🔨	5	0	0	1	0	2	X	X	X	X	8
Prince Edward Island (Burke)	0	0	1	0	1	0	X	X	X	X	2

==== Draw 18 ====
Sheet B	1	2	3	4	5	6	7	8	9	10	Final
New Brunswick (McClure) 🔨	0	2	1	4	1	2	1	X	X	X	11
Northwest Territories (White)	1	0	0	0	0	0	0	X	X	X	1

Sheet D	1	2	3	4	5	6	7	8	9	10	Final
Prince Edward Island (Burke) 🔨	1	0	1	0	0	1	0	0	0	X	3
Nova Scotia (Doyle)	0	2	0	2	1	0	3	0	0	X	8

Sheet F	1	2	3	4	5	6	7	8	9	10	Final
Newfoundland (Strong) 🔨	1	2	1	0	1	0	2	1	X	X	8
Ontario (Garland)	0	0	0	1	0	1	0	0	X	X	2

Sheet G	1	2	3	4	5	6	7	8	9	10	Final
Alberta (Moore) 🔨	2	0	0	0	0	1	0	0	2	X	5
Saskatchewan (Miller)	0	1	1	1	2	0	0	2	0	X	7

==== Draw 19 ====
Sheet A	1	2	3	4	5	6	7	8	9	10	Final
Prince Edward Island (Burke) 🔨	2	0	0	1	0	0	0	2	0	1	6
British Columbia (Provost)	0	0	1	0	0	0	1	0	2	0	4

Sheet D	1	2	3	4	5	6	7	8	9	10	Final
Northwest Territories (White) 🔨	0	0	3	0	0	0	1	0	1	X	5
Newfoundland (Strong)	1	1	0	1	0	1	0	3	0	X	7

Sheet E	1	2	3	4	5	6	7	8	9	10	Final
Manitoba (Adams) 🔨	1	0	0	0	1	1	0	2	0	0	5
Quebec (Larouche)	0	1	2	0	0	0	1	0	2	2	8

Sheet G	1	2	3	4	5	6	7	8	9	10	Final
Yukon (Bekenes) 🔨	1	3	0	0	0	0	0	1	X	X	5
Northern Ontario (Uhryn)	0	0	3	0	2	3	1	0	X	X	9

==== Draw 20 ====
Sheet B	1	2	3	4	5	6	7	8	9	10	11	Final
Northern Ontario (Uhryn) 🔨	2	0	1	0	0	0	1	0	0	1	1	6
Ontario (Garland)	0	1	0	0	1	0	0	2	1	0	0	5

Sheet C	1	2	3	4	5	6	7	8	9	10	Final
Quebec (Larouche) 🔨	1	0	1	0	2	0	2	0	1	0	7
Alberta (Moore)	0	1	0	2	0	2	0	1	0	2	8

Sheet E	1	2	3	4	5	6	7	8	9	10	Final
Nova Scotia (Doyle) 🔨	1	0	0	0	0	1	0	0	3	X	5
Yukon (Bekenes)	0	0	0	0	0	0	0	2	0	X	2

Sheet G	1	2	3	4	5	6	7	8	9	10	Final
New Brunswick (McClure) 🔨	2	1	0	2	1	1	0	0	6	X	13
Saskatchewan (Miller)	0	0	1	0	0	0	2	1	0	X	4

=== Playoffs ===
Tiebreaker		Semifinal		Final
Northern Ontario	6
Saskatchewan	7	Nova Scotia	8
		Saskatchewan	4
				Quebec	2
				Nova Scotia	4

==== Tiebreaker ====
Sheet F	1	2	3	4	5	6	7	8	9	10	Final
Northern Ontario (Uhryn)	0	2	0	1	0	1	1	1	0	0	6
Saskatchewan (Miller) 🔨	1	0	1	0	4	0	0	0	0	1	7

Player percentages
Northern Ontario		Saskatchewan	
Amy Stachiw	79%	Kristin Regnier	63%
Kelli Smith	73%	Stacy Helm	56%
Kari MacLean	61%	Marliese Miller	68%
Elaine Uhryn	88%	Stefanie Miller	75%
Total	75%	Total	65%

==== Semifinal ====
Sheet C	1	2	3	4	5	6	7	8	9	10	Final
Nova Scotia (Doyle) 🔨	2	0	2	1	0	0	3	0	0	X	8
Saskatchewan (Miller)	0	0	0	0	2	0	0	1	1	X	4

Player percentages
Nova Scotia		Saskatchewan	
Candice MacLean	90%	Kristin Regnier	81%
Tara Hamer	83%	Stacy Helm	68%
Beth Roach	80%	Marliese Miller	66%
Meredith Doyle	72%	Stefanie Miller	72%
Total	81%	Total	72%

==== Final ====
Sheet C	1	2	3	4	5	6	7	8	9	10	Final
Quebec (Larouche) 🔨	0	0	0	0	0	0	0	2	0	0	2
Nova Scotia (Doyle)	0	0	0	0	1	0	1	0	1	1	4

Player percentages
Quebec		Nova Scotia	
Valerie Grenier	78%	Candice MacLean	81%
Marie-Eve Letourneau	76%	Tara Hamer	83%
Nancy Belanger	80%	Beth Roach	71%
Marie-France Larouche	71%	Meredith Doyle	85%
Total	76%	Total	80%

== Qualification ==
=== Ontario ===
The Ontario Junior Curling Championships were held in Owen Sound, with the finals on January 19.

Sara Garland of Unionville won the women's event over Cannington's Denna Schell in the final, 12-1. In the men's final, John Morris of the Ottawa Curling Club defeated Greg Balsdon of St. Catharines 9-5.
