= Hatchet Lake (Halifax Regional Municipality) =

Community in Nova Scotia, Canada

- Location within Nova Scotia
- Coordinates: 44°34′N 63°43′W
- Country: Canada
- Province: Nova Scotia
- Municipality: Halifax Regional Municipality
- Postal code: B3T

Hatchet Lake is a community in the Canadian province of Nova Scotia, located on Prospect Road. It is part of the Halifax Regional Municipality and serves as one of the rural communities situated west of Halifax. The community is largely residential, sharing a name with a nearby lake.

== History ==
=== The early years ===
According to the official website for the Prospect Road Communities, the community's name either originates from a settler who lost his hatchet or from nearby lakes that resemble hatchets. The settlement was part of the 1,550 acres of land given to families in 1787 via a connection with Brookside. It later developed into a small immigrant farming community.

=== Post-World War II ===
The population of the community had largely increased after the end of World War II, with new residents moving into the area. By the late 20th century, Hatchet Lake was considered "a bedroom community of Halifax." Its location along Route 333 attracted outsiders, many of which buying and purchasing houses to "easily commute to Halifax for employment."

=== Present day ===
In 2020, a proposed commerce in Hatchet Lake was appealed to the Nova Scotia Utility and Review Board (UARB). Some residents opposed the appeal, raising concerns about land use and social impact, prompting a hearing on the subject.

In early 2021, the UARB ruled in favour of allowing developments to proceed, concluding that the proposal complied with the planning bylaw requirements.

== Geography ==
Hatchet Lake is located within the Halifax Regional Municipality along Route 333 (Prospect Road), roughly 17 km west of downtown Halifax. The community is adjacent to Hatchet Lake, bearing the same name. The surrounding landscape consists of forest, residential areas, and several nearby lakes.

=== Communications ===
- The first three characters of the postal code are B3T
- The Telephone exchange is 902, 782

== Attractions ==
Several attractions are located at and around Hatchet Lake:

- Indian Lake Golf Course – A public golf course located in the community that was featured in a Global News report covering early-season demand.
- Prospect Road Community Centre – A local hub that has acted as an official comfort centre and includes a Halifax Public Libraries kiosk.

== Media ==
Hatchet Lake has been used as a filming location for the film 111, a Canadian-Swiss production based on the Swissair Flight 111 accident.
