= Heather Nedohin =

Canadian curler

- Curler
- Born: Heather Godberson; July 15, 1975 (age 51); Fort St. John, British Columbia, Canada

Team
- Curling club: Sherwood Park CC, Sherwood Park, AB

Curling career
- Member Association: Alberta
- Hearts: 7 (1997, 1998, 1999, 2000, 2012, 2013, 2017)
- World Championship: 2 (1998, 2012)
- Top CTRS ranking: 2nd (2011–12)
Medal record
Women's curling
Representing Canada
World Championships
Bronze medal – third place	1998 Kamloops
Bronze medal – third place	2012 Lethbridge
Scotties Tournament of Hearts
Silver medal – second place	1999 Charlottetown
World Junior Championships
Gold medal – first place	1996 Red Deer
Representing Alberta
Scotties Tournament of Hearts
Gold medal – first place	1998 Regina
Gold medal – first place	2012 Red Deer

Heather Nedohin (born Heather Godberson; July 15, 1975) is a Canadian curler from Sherwood Park, Alberta. She is a Canadian former and World Junior champion, two-time Tournament of Hearts Champion and a two-time World bronze medallist. She is married to three time World Champion David Nedohin.

She is currently the coach of the Rachel Homan women's curling team.

== Career ==
Born in Fort St. John, British Columbia, Nedohin's family moved to Alberta.

=== Juniors ===
Nedohin won her first and only Alberta provincial junior curling title in 1996. This earned her, and her Grande Prairie rink of third Carmen Whyte, second Kristie Moore and lead Terelyn Bloor the right to represent Alberta at the 1996 Canadian Junior Curling Championships in Edmonton. The team finished the round robin with a 9-3 record, tied for first with Nova Scotia's Meredith Doyle. By virtue of beating Doyle in the round robin, Nedohin earned a bye to the final where she met Saskatchewan's Cindy Street who beat Doyle in the semi-final. Nedohin beat Street 7-5, earning her rink a berth in the 1996 World Junior Curling Championships in Red Deer, Alberta.

At the 1996 World Juniors, the team placed third after the round robin, with a 7-2 record, behind Sweden's Margaretha Lindahl and Switzerland's Nadja Heuer. However, they beat Switzerland in the semi-final, 6-4, and then beat 4th place Scotland's Julia Ewart 7-6 in the final, earning the team the gold medal.

=== Early career ===
After Juniors, Nedohin joined the Cathy Borst (King) rink as the team's third. As a member of the Borst rink, Nedohin won her first provincial title in 1997. This qualified the team for the 1997 Scott Tournament of Hearts, representing Alberta. The team finished the round robin in a three-way tie for 2nd place with a 7-4 record. However, the rink lost the 3 vs. 4 page playoff game against Newfoundland's Laura Phillips.

The rink won their second provincial title in 1998, qualifying them for the 1998 Scott Tournament of Hearts This time, the team finished the round robin in first place, with a 10-1 record. The rink defeated Ontario's Anne Merklinger twice to win the championship. In both games they beat Merklinger 7-6, both going into extra ends. The win earned the team a trip to the 1998 Ford World Curling Championships in Kamloops, British Columbia.

At the 1998 Worlds, the rink finished the round robin in a three-way tie for second with a record of 6-3. In their semi-final match up, the team lost to the first place Sweden team, skipped by Elisabet Gustafson by a score of 8-7. The team then went on to beat Norway's Dordi Nordby 10-2 for the bronze medal.

By virtue of winning the 1998 Hearts, the team got to represent Team Canada at the 1999 Scott Tournament of Hearts, as defending champions. The rink had another winning record at the event, finishing the round robin in third place, tied with Saskatchewan's Cindy Street at a record of 7-4. The rink beat Street 10-4 in the 3 vs. 4 game, then beat Manitoba's Connie Laliberte 10-4 in the semi-final. This put the team in the final against Nova Scotia's Colleen Jones, which they lost, 6-4.

=== 1999–2010 ===
In 1999, Nedohin left the King rink, to form her own rink of Carmen Barrack, Kristie Moore and Rona McGregor. In their first season together, the team won the Alberta provincial championship, Nedohin's third. The team represented Alberta at the 2000 Scott Tournament of Hearts, but did not make the playoffs. The team finished the event with a 6-5 record.

After failing to win another provincial title, the team broke apart in 2002, and Nedohin joined up with Atina Johnston whom she played three seasons for. In 2005, she joined the Deb Santos rink as her third, and then in 2007 she joined up with former teammate Kristie Moore as her third. The following year, the team juggled its lineup, and Nedohin was once again a skip, with Moore becoming the team's second. Beth Iskiw would throw third stones and Pamela Appelman remained as the team's lead.

The team's new line up earned the team a spot at the 2009 Alberta Scotties Tournament of Hearts, where they lost in the final to Cheryl Bernard. After the season, Moore left the rink and was replaced with Jessica Mair. The rink failed to make the playoffs at the 2010 Alberta Scotties Tournament of Hearts.

=== 2010–2015 ===
In 2010, Nedohin added Nova Scotian Laine Peters as the team's lead. At the 2011 Alberta Scotties Tournament of Hearts, Nedohin lost to Shannon Kleibrink in the final.

The team would have a stellar 2011-12 season. Nedohin went to her first Grand Slam final at the 2011 Manitoba Lotteries Women's Curling Classic, where she lost to fellow Albertan Renée Sonnenberg (a team that included 3 of Nedohin's former teammates). Her rink then went on to win the 2012 Alberta Scotties Tournament of Hearts, giving her another trip to the national championships. At the 2012 Scotties Tournament of Hearts, in Red Deer, the team finished the round robin with a 7-4 record, tied for third with Quebec's Marie-France Larouche. They then beat Larouche 7-4 in the 3 vs. 4 game, and then beat Manitoba's Jennifer Jones 6-5 in the semi-final. In the final, Nedohin won the national title, defeating British Columbia's Kelly Scott 7-6.

Nedohin's 2012 Scotties win qualified her team to represent Canada at the 2012 Ford World Women's Curling Championship in Lethbridge, Alberta. The rink finished the round robin with a 7-4 record, tied for fourth with the United States' Allison Pottinger. Nedohin beat Pottinger in the tie breaker match, qualifying them for the playoffs against Korea's Kim Ji-sun. Nedohin lost to Kim in the 3 vs. 4 match, by a score of 4-3. This put them in the bronze medal game, where Nedohin would face Kim once again. With the bronze on the line this time, Nedohin beat Kim, 9-6, earning Canada a bronze medal.

As winners of the 2012 Scotties, Nedohin would get to skip Team Canada at the 2013 Scotties Tournament of Hearts. Nedohin's rink would not be able to repeat her 2012 performance, as her team would finish 4th, after losing in the bronze medal game to British Columbia's Kelly Scott.

Nedohin would play in the 2013 Canadian Olympic Curling Trials where she would finish with a 3–4 record, missing the playoffs.

In 2015 Heather Nedohin announced she would be stepping back from the game and that Chelsea Carey, formerly of Manitoba, would be taking over her current team.

=== 2015–present ===
Despite stepping back from playing competitive curling, Nedohin was called to be Shannon Kleibrink's alternate as she and her represented Alberta at the 2017 Scotties Tournament of Hearts. During the Hearts, Nedohin played in nine of the eleven games for the team, skipping them in eight of them as Kleibrink had sustained a back injury prior to the tournament. They ultimately finished the round robin in sixth place with a 5–6 record, not enough to advance to the playoffs. She also played mixed doubles curling during the 2019–20 season and won the 2019 STP Mixed Doubles on the World Curling Tour with partner Roland Robinson.

She began coaching the Kerri Einarson rink for the 2020–21 season.

Nedohin skipped the Rachel Homan rink at the 2023 Saville Shootout, replacing Homan who had just given birth. Nedohin led the team to win the event, defeating Team Jennifer Jones, skipped by Chelsea Carey (Jone was also absent) in the final.

She began coaching the Homan rink in 2025.

== Personal life ==
Nedohin is a graduate of Grande Prairie Regional College and North Peace High School, and attended the University of Alberta. Since the spring of 2014 she has been business manager of the Sherwood Park Curling Club, in Sherwood Park, AB. She has two daughters, Halle and Alyssa.

== Teams ==
Season	Skip	Third	Second	Lead
1995–96	Heather Godberson	Carmen Whyte	Kristie Moore	Terelyn Bloor
1996–97	Cathy Borst	Heather Godberson	Brenda Bohmer	Kate Horne
1997–98	Cathy Borst	Heather Godberson	Brenda Bohmer	Kate Horne
1998–99	Cathy Borst	Heather Godberson	Brenda Bohmer	Kate Horne
1999–00	Heather Godberson	Carmen Barrack	Kristie Moore	Rona McGregor
2000–01	Heather Godberson	Carmen Barrack	Kristie Moore	Rona McGregor
2001–02	Heather Nedohin	Carmen Barrack	Kristie Moore	Rona McGregor
2002–03	Heather Nedohin	Atina Johnston	Lawnie MacDonald	Rona Pasika
2003–04	Heather Nedohin (fourth)	Atina Johnston (skip)	Lawnie MacDonald	Rona Pasika
2004–05	Heather Nedohin	Atina Johnston (skip)	Lawnie MacDonald	Rona Pasika
2005–06	Deb Santos	Heather Nedohin	Kate Horne	Brenda Bohmer
2006–07	Deb Santos	Heather Nedohin	Kristie Moore	Kate Horne
2007–08	Heather Nedohin (fourth)	Kristie Moore (skip)	Beth Iskiw	Pamela Appelman
2008–09	Heather Nedohin	Beth Iskiw	Kristie Moore	Pamela Appelman
2009–10	Heather Nedohin	Beth Iskiw	Jessica Mair	Pamela Appelman
2010–11	Heather Nedohin	Beth Iskiw	Jessica Mair	Laine Peters
2011–12	Heather Nedohin	Beth Iskiw	Jessica Mair	Laine Peters
2012–13	Heather Nedohin	Beth Iskiw	Jessica Mair	Laine Peters
2013–14	Heather Nedohin	Beth Iskiw	Jessica Mair	Laine Peters
2014–15	Heather Nedohin	Amy Nixon	Jocelyn Peterman	Laine Peters

== Grand Slam record ==
Key
C	Champion
F	Lost in Final
SF	Lost in Semifinal
QF	Lost in Quarterfinals
R16	Lost in the round of 16
Q	Did not advance to playoffs
T2	Played in Tier 2 event
DNP	Did not participate in event
N/A	Not a Grand Slam event that season

Event	2006–07	2007–08	2008–09	2009–10	2010–11	2011–12	2012–13	2013–14	2014–15
Autumn Gold	QF	Q	QF	Q	SF	Q	Q	QF	QF
Colonial Square	N/A	N/A	N/A	N/A	N/A	N/A	QF	Q	DNP
Masters	N/A	N/A	N/A	N/A	N/A	N/A	Q	QF	Q
Canadian Open	N/A	N/A	N/A	N/A	N/A	N/A	N/A	N/A	SF
Players'	Q	Q	Q	Q	SF	Q	Q	Q	QF

=== Former events ===
Event	2006–07	2007–08	2008–09	2009–10	2010–11	2011–12	2012–13	2013–14
Wayden Transportation	DNP	SF	Q	N/A	N/A	N/A	N/A	N/A
Sobeys Slam	N/A	Q	DNP	N/A	DNP	N/A	N/A	N/A
Manitoba Lotteries	QF	Q	DNP	SF	SF	F	Q	DNP
