= Kristie Moore =

Canadian curler

- Curler
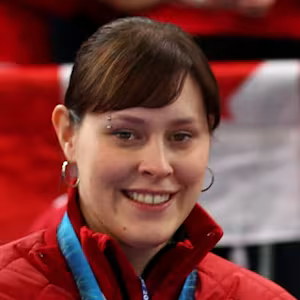
- Moore at the 2010 Olympics in Vancouver
- Born: April 22, 1979 (age 47); Grande Prairie, Alberta, Canada

Team
- Curling club: Grande Prairie CC, Grande Prairie, AB

Curling career
- Member Association: Alberta (1996-2015; 2017-present); Saskatchewan (2015-2017)
- Hearts: 5 (2000, 2013, 2018, 2019, 2023)
- Top CTRS ranking: 5th (2018-19)
- Grand Slam victories: 1 (2011 Manitoba Lotteries)
Medal record
Curling
Representing Canada
Winter Olympics
Silver medal – second place	2010 Vancouver
Canadian Olympic Curling Trials
Gold medal – first place	2009 Edmonton
World Junior Championships
Gold medal – first place	1996 Red Deer

Kristie Moore (born April 22, 1979) is a Canadian curler from Sexsmith, Alberta. She was the alternate player on the Canadian women's team at the 2010 Winter Olympics. She was five months pregnant at the time, making her only the third Olympic athlete to be pregnant during Olympic competition. The first was Swedish figure skater Magda Julin back in 1920, and the second was German skeleton racer Diane Sartor in the 2006 Winter Olympics.

== Career ==
She is a former Canadian and World Junior Champion. In 1996, playing second for Heather Nedohin (Godberson), she won both the 1996 Canadian Junior Curling Championships and the World Junior Curling Championships.

In 1999, Moore teamed up again with Nedohin. In 2000, she won her first provincial championship. At the 2000 Scott Tournament of Hearts, the team finished with a 6–5 record.

She took time off from curling from 2004 to 2006 before returning to the Nedohin team once again. She left the team in 2009 to play second for Renelle Bryden, which was her regular skip. She would team up with Renee Sonnenberg in 2010 playing second, until she left to form her own team at the end of the 2011–2012 season.

Moore and her rink of Blaine de Jager, Michelle Dykstra and Amber Cheveldale won the 2013 Alberta Scotties Tournament of Hearts. The team represented Alberta at the 2013 Scotties Tournament of Hearts, and finished with a 1–10 record, in last place.

She bounce around for the next few years and from 2015 to 2017, found herself playing for the Chantelle Eberle rink out of Saskatchewan, helping fill in for the team as they battled some injuries.

At the end of the 2016–17 season ,she was picked up by Team Casey Scheidegger out of Lethbridge, Alberta. The team participated in the 2016 and 2021 Canadian Olympic Curling Trials. In 2018, they represent Alberta at the Scotties and, at the 2019 Scotties Tournament of Hearts, was one of the Wildcard teams beating out Team Kerri Einarson to get there.

== Personal life ==
Moore grew up in DeBolt, Alberta. She currently works as a massage therapist for Sexsmith Physiotherapy. She is married to Shane Wray and has three children.

== Grand Slam record ==
Key
C	Champion
F	Lost in Final
SF	Lost in Semifinal
QF	Lost in Quarterfinals
R16	Lost in the round of 16
Q	Did not advance to playoffs
T2	Played in Tier 2 event
DNP	Did not participate in event
N/A	Not a Grand Slam event that season

Event	2006–07	2007–08	2008–09	2009–10	2010–11	2011–12	2012–13	2013–14	2014–15	2015–16	2016–17	2017–18	2018–19	2019–20	2020–21	2021–22	2022–23
National	N/A	N/A	N/A	N/A	N/A	N/A	N/A	N/A	N/A	DNP	DNP	F	Q	Q	N/A	DNP	DNP
Tour Challenge	N/A	N/A	N/A	N/A	N/A	N/A	N/A	N/A	N/A	DNP	DNP	Q	Q	Q	N/A	N/A	T2
Masters	N/A	N/A	N/A	N/A	N/A	N/A	DNP	DNP	DNP	DNP	DNP	QF	SF	Q	N/A	DNP	DNP
Canadian Open	N/A	N/A	N/A	N/A	N/A	N/A	N/A	N/A	DNP	DNP	DNP	Q	QF	DNP	N/A	N/A	DNP
Players'	DNP	Q	DNP	DNP	DNP	DNP	DNP	DNP	DNP	DNP	QF	DNP	SF	N/A	DNP	DNP	DNP
Champions Cup	N/A	N/A	N/A	N/A	N/A	N/A	N/A	N/A	N/A	DNP	Q	DNP	Q	N/A	DNP	DNP	DNP

=== Former events ===
Event	2006–07	2007–08	2008–09	2009–10	2010–11	2011–12	2012–13	2013–14	2014–15
Wayden Transportation	DNP	SF	Q	N/A	N/A	N/A	N/A	N/A	N/A
Sobeys Slam	N/A	Q	DNP	N/A	DNP	N/A	N/A	N/A	N/A
Manitoba Liquor & Lotteries	QF	Q	DNP	DNP	QF	C	DNP	DNP	DNP
Autumn Gold	QF	Q	QF	DNP	Q	Q	DNP	DNP	Q
Colonial Square	N/A	N/A	N/A	N/A	N/A	N/A	Q	DNP	DNP
