= Laine Peters =

Canadian curler

- Curler
- Born: March 24, 1970 (age 56)

Team
- Curling club: The Glencoe Club, Calgary, AB

Curling career
- Member Association: Nova Scotia (1999-2008); Alberta (2009-present)
- Hearts: 11 (1999, 2000, 2001, 2002, 2003, 2004, 2008, 2012, 2013, 2016, 2017)
- World Championship: 6 (1999, 2001, 2002, 2003, 2012, 2016)
- Top CTRS ranking: 3rd (2017-18)
- Grand Slam victories: 1: (Canadian Open: 2018)
Medal record
Women's curling
Representing Canada
World Curling Championships
Gold medal – first place	2001 Lausanne
Silver medal – second place	2003 Winnipeg
Bronze medal – third place	2012 Lethbridge
Scotties Tournament of Hearts
Gold medal – first place	1999 Charlottetown
Gold medal – first place	2001 Sudbury
Gold medal – first place	2002 Brandon
Gold medal – first place	2003 Kitchener
Gold medal – first place	2012 Red Deer
Gold medal – first place	2016 Grande Prairie
Bronze medal – third place	2017 St. Catharines
Canadian Olympic Curling Trials
Silver medal – second place	2017 Ottawa
Bronze medal – third place	2001 Regina

Laine Peters [pronounced: LAY-nee] (born March 24, 1970, in Arborfield, Saskatchewan) is a Canadian curler, from Calgary. Peters has played in 11 Tournament of Hearts and six World Championships. Peters grew up in Carrot River, Saskatchewan.

== Career ==
=== Nova Scotia ===
At the 1999 Scott Tournament of Hearts, Peters was the alternate with Nova Scotia (skipped by Colleen Jones). The team won the event, and represented Canada at the 1999 Ford World Women's Curling Championship, where they finished fifth. Peters would not play in any games in either event.

Peters won her first Nova Scotia Tournament of Hearts in 2000, playing lead with Team Kay Zinck. The team would represent Nova Scotia at the 2000 Scott Tournament of Hearts. After posting a 7-4 round robin record, the team lost in a tiebreaker to Team British Columbia, skipped by Kelley Law.

Peters was the alternate with Team Nova Scotia again (skipped by Jones) at the 2001 Scott Tournament of Hearts, which the team won. They would go on to win a gold medal at the 2001 Ford World Women's Curling Championship. Again, Peters would not play in any games with the team. Peters would continue to be the alternate with the team at the 2002 and 2003 Scott Tournament of Hearts, winning both events. The team would finish in fourth place at the 2002 Ford World Women's Curling Championship and won a silver medal at the 2003 Ford World Women's Curling Championship. Peters would play in two games at the 2003 Hearts.

Peters won her second Nova Scotia provincial title in 2004, playing second with Team Heather Smith-Dacey. The team represented Nova Scotia at the 2004 Scott Tournament of Hearts, finishing the round robin with a 6–5 record, missing the playoffs.

Peters won a third Nova Scotia title in 2008, playing second with Team Mary-Anne Arsenault. The team represented Nova Scotia at the 2008 Scotties Tournament of Hearts, and again finished the round robin with a 6–5 record, missing the playoffs.

In addition to her women's success, Peters won the Canadian Mixed Curling Championship in 2002 playing lead with a team skipped by Mark Dacey.

=== Alberta ===
Peters moved to Calgary in 2009 and joined Team Heather Nedohin in 2010 as her lead. Peters won her first Alberta Scotties Tournament of Hearts in 2012. The team would represent Alberta at the 2012 Scotties Tournament of Hearts. There, Peters and teammate Beth Iskiw became the first time teammates had played together for two different provinces (the pair represented Nova Scotia at the 2004 Hearts). Finishing the round robin with a 7–4 record, the team won all three of their playoff games en route to the championship. The team represented Canada at the 2012 Ford World Women's Curling Championship. At the Worlds, they finished the round robin with a 7–4 record, tied with the United States (skipped by Allison Pottinger). They beat the Americans, but would lose to South Korea (skipped by Kim Ji-sun) in the 3 vs. 4 page playoff game, sending Canada to the bronze medal game. The bronze medal game would be a re-match against the Koreans, with Canada prevailing.

The Nedohin rink would represent Team Canada at the 2013 Scotties Tournament of Hearts by virtue of winning the championship the year prior. The team finished the round robin with a 7–4 record, sending the team to the playoffs. There, the team beat British Columbia (skipped by Kelly Scott) in the 3 vs. 4 game, but lost in the semifinal against Manitoba (skipped by Jennifer Jones). That sent the team to a bronze medal rematch against B.C., which they would lose.

Nedohin retired from competitive curling in 2015, and the team replaced her with Chelsea Carey as the team's skip. The team won another Alberta Scotties in 2016, and would represent Alberta at the 2016 Scotties Tournament of Hearts. There, the team finished the round robin in first place with a 9–2 record. They would go on to win both of their playoff games, defeating Team Canada (skipped by Jennifer Jones) in the 1 vs. 2 game and Northern Ontario (skipped by Krista McCarville) in the final en route to the championship. The team represented Canada at the 2016 Ford World Women's Curling Championship, where they finished the round robin with an 8–3 record. In the playoffs, they would lose to Russia (skipped by Anna Sidorova) twice, settling for a fourth-place finish.

Team Carey would represent Team Canada at the 2017 Scotties Tournament of Hearts as defending champions. They finished the event with a 9–2 record, sending the team to the playoffs. There, they would lose to Northern Ontario's Krista McCarville in the 3 vs. 4 game, before beating them in the bronze medal game. Team Carey played in the 2017 Canadian Olympic Curling Trials, and after going undefeated in the round robin, they would lose to Team Rachel Homan in the final. The team played in the Wild Card game at the 2018 Scotties Tournament of Hearts, but lost to Team Kerri Einarson, failing to qualify for the main event. The team disbanded following the season.

For the 2018-19 season, Peters joined a new team of Laura Walker, Cathy Overton-Clapham and Lori Olson-Johns. They played in four of seven Slams. At provincials, they were knocked out of the C Event 9-2 by Jodi Marthaller. After just one season, the team disbanded.

Peters joined the Cheryl Bernard senior women's rink for the 2021–22 curling season. The team won the 2021 Alberta Senior Women's Championship, and represented the province at the 2021 Canadian Senior Curling Championships, where they finished in fourth place.

== Coaching ==
Peters coached the Tabitha Peterson rink from the United States from 2019 to 2022, and was the team's coach at the 2022 Winter Olympics. She and Natalie Nicholson were named USA Curling Coach of the Year in 2020. She was an assistant coach with the Calgary Dinos curling team for the 2022–23 season.

== Honours ==
Peters has been inducted into the Nova Scotia Sports Hall of Fame and recently CurlSask created an award in her name to honour junior campers best demonstrating teamwork, sportsmanship, community involvement, and leadership skills.

== Personal life ==
Peters is employed as an executive assistant to the President of the Canadian Olympic Committee.

== Teams ==
Season	Skip	Third	Second	Lead
1999–00	Kay Zinck	Heather Smith-Dacey	Krista Bernard	Laine Peters
2003–04	Meredith Doyle	Heather Smith-Dacey (skip)	Laine Peters	Beth Iskiw
2004–05	Meredith Doyle	Heather Smith-Dacey (skip)	Laine Peters	Alison Burgess
2005–06	Heather Smith-Dacey	Cheryl McBain	Laine Peters	Kelly Anderson
2006–07	Mary-Anne Arsenault	Kim Kelly	Laine Peters	Nancy Delahunt
2007–08	Mary-Anne Arsenault	Kim Kelly	Laine Peters	Nancy Delahunt
2008–09	Mary-Anne Arsenault	Kay Zinck	Laine Peters	Theresa Breen
2010–11	Heather Nedohin	Beth Iskiw	Jessica Mair	Laine Peters
2011–12	Heather Nedohin	Beth Iskiw	Jessica Mair	Laine Peters
2012–13	Heather Nedohin	Beth Iskiw	Jessica Mair	Laine Peters
2013–14	Heather Nedohin	Beth Iskiw	Jessica Mair	Laine Peters
2014–15	Heather Nedohin	Amy Nixon	Jessica Mair / Jocelyn Peterman	Laine Peters
2015–16	Chelsea Carey	Amy Nixon	Jocelyn Peterman	Laine Peters
2016–17	Chelsea Carey	Amy Nixon	Jocelyn Peterman	Laine Peters
2017–18	Chelsea Carey	Cathy Overton-Clapham	Jocelyn Peterman	Laine Peters
2018–19	Laura Walker	Cathy Overton-Clapham	Lori Olson-Johns	Laine Peters
2019–20	Cheryl Bernard	Carolyn Darbyshire-McRorie	Laine Peters	Karen Ruus
2021–22	Cheryl Bernard	Carolyn McRorie	Laine Peters	Karen Ruus
