= Beth Iskiw =

Canadian curler

- Curler
- Born: Beth Roach; April 20, 1979 (age 47); Truro, Nova Scotia, Canada

Team
- Curling club: Saville Sports Centre, Edmonton, AB

Curling career
- Hearts: 6 (2002, 2004, 2005, 2006, 2012, 2013)
- World Championship: 1 (2012)
Medal record
Curling
Representing Canada
World Championships
Bronze medal – third place	2012 Lethbridge
Scotties Tournament of Hearts
Gold medal – first place	2012 Red Deer
World Junior Championships
Bronze medal – third place	1997 Karuizawa

Beth Iskiw (born April 20, 1979 in Truro, Nova Scotia as Beth Roach) is a Canadian curler from Edmonton, Alberta, Canada.

As a junior, Iskiw won four straight provincial junior titles in her native Nova Scotia from 1996 to 1999, playing third for Meredith Doyle. The rink also won the Canadian Junior Curling Championships in 1997, and would win a bronze medal at the 1997 World Junior Curling Championships. In 2000, she was invited as the alternate player for the Canadian Junior team skipped by Stefanie Miller. The team won the silver medal at the World Juniors

After her junior career, Iskiw stuck with Doyle, and won two provincial women's championships, in 2002 and 2004. The team finished with a 5-6 record at the 2002 Scott Tournament of Hearts and a 6-5 record at the 2004 Scott Tournament of Hearts.

In 2004, Iskiw moved to Alberta. She was invited to be Cathy King's alternate at both the 2005 Scott Tournament of Hearts and the 2006 Scott Tournament of Hearts. In 2007, Iskiw joined up with Heather Nedohin. She won her first Alberta provincial championship in 2012 with Nedohin, Jessica Mair, and Laine Peters. There, Iskiw and teammate Laine Peters became the first time teammates had played together for two different provinces (the pair represented Nova Scotia at the 2004 Hearts). Finishing the round robin with a 7-4 record, the team won all three of their playoff games en route to the championship. The team represented Canada at the 2012 Ford World Women's Curling Championship. At the Worlds, they finished the round robin with a 7-4 record, tied with the United States (skipped by Allison Pottinger). They beat the Americans, but would lose to South Korea (skipped by Kim Ji-sun) in the 3 vs. 4 page playoff game, sending Canada to the bronze medal game. The bronze medal game would be a re-match against the Koreans, with Canada prevailing.

The Nedohin rink would represent Team Canada at the 2013 Scotties Tournament of Hearts by virtue of winning the championship the year prior. The team finished the round robin with a 7-4 record, sending the team to the playoffs. There, the team beat British Columbia (skipped by Kelly Scott) in the 3 vs. 4 game, but lost in the semifinal against Manitoba (skipped by Jennifer Jones). That sent the team to a bronze medal rematch against B.C., which they would lose.

The team also competed in the 2013 Canadian Olympic Curling Trials Winnipeg, MB.

Iskiw decided to take the 2014-2015 season off and was replaced on the Nedohin team by Amy Nixon.

== Personal life ==
Iskiw currently coaches team Kelsey Rocque. She is employed as a digital learning executive for WILEY. She is married and has two children.
