= Brookside, Nova Scotia =

Community in Nova Scotia, Canada

Coordinates: 44°32′57.8″N 63°42′59.3″W

Brookside in Nova Scotia

Brookside (2021 pop.: 1,439) is a rural community in the Canadian province of Nova Scotia, located in the Halifax Regional Municipality on the Chebucto Peninsula.
