= Meredith Harrison =

Canadian curler

Medal record

Curling

World Junior Championships
Bronze medal – third place	1997	

Meredith Harrison (born Meredith Doyle) is a Canadian curler from Brookfield, Nova Scotia.

She represented Nova Scotia at the 1996 Canadian Junior Curling Championships, but lost the semifinal match 4–3 to Saskatchewan's Cindy Street. In her second appearance as the skip for team Nova Scotia at the 1997 Canadian Junior Curling Championships, Harrison won the 1997 title. At the 1997 World Junior Curling Championships, Harrison won a bronze medal for Canada. Harrison returned to the Canadian Junior championships in 1998 and 1999 but was unable to win another national title.

Harrison skipped in her first Tournament of Hearts in 2002 finishing with a 5–6 record. In 2004, she played fourth stones for skip Heather Smith-Dacey and finished 6–5. She returned once again in 2007 playing third for another Canadian Junior Champion, Jill Mouzar and finished with a 3–8 record.
