= 2020 Canadian Open (curling) =

Grand Slam of Curling event

2020 Meridian Canadian Open
- Host city: Yorkton, Saskatchewan
- Arena: Gallagher Centre
- Dates: January 14–19
- Men's winner: (Ontario) Team Jacobs
- Curling club: Soo Curlers Association, Sault Ste. Marie
- Skip: Brad Jacobs
- Third: Marc Kennedy
- Second: E. J. Harnden
- Lead: Ryan Harnden
- Finalist: (Ontario) John Epping
- Women's winner: (Sweden) Team Hasselborg
- Curling club: Sundbybergs CK, Sundbyberg
- Skip: Anna Hasselborg
- Third: Sara McManus
- Second: Agnes Knochenhauer
- Lead: Sofia Mabergs
- Finalist: (South Korea) Kim Min-ji

The 2020 Meridian Canadian Open was held from January 14 to 19 at the Gallagher Centre in Yorkton, Saskatchewan. It was the fourth Grand Slam event and third "major" of the 2019–20 season. Due to the COVID-19 pandemic, it would end up being the last Grand Slam of the season, and the last Slam to be held until the 2021 Champions Cup held in April 2021.

In the men's final, Team Jacobs won their third straight Grand Slam by beating Team Epping in a tight 6–5 game. In the women's final, Team Hasselborg also won her third straight event defeating young Team Kim 7–5 in an extra end.

== Qualification ==
Sixteen teams compete in the Canadian Open, including the seven top-ranked teams on the World Curling Tour's Order of Merit rankings as of December 16, 2019, the seven top teams on the Year-to-Date rankings as of December 16, the Tier 2 winner of the 2019 Tour Challenge, and a sponsor's exemption. The first matches will be set per the rankings on December 24, 2019

=== Men ===
Top men's teams as of December 16:

#	Order of Merit	Year-to-Date
1	1. (Ontario) Brad Jacobs	1. (Ontario) ~~Brad Jacobs~~; 2. (Ontario) John Epping
2	2. (Ontario) ~~John Epping~~; 3. (Alberta) Kevin Koe	3. (Newfoundland and Labrador) Brad Gushue
3	4. (Alberta) Brendan Bottcher	4. (Scotland) Bruce Mouat
4	5. (Sweden) Niklas Edin	5. (Sweden) ~~Niklas Edin~~; 6. (Alberta) ~~Brendan Bottcher~~; 7. (Alberta) ~~Kevin Koe~~; 8. (Switzerland) Yannick Schwaller
5	6. (Scotland) ~~Bruce Mouat~~; 7. (Newfoundland and Labrador) ~~Brad Gushue~~; 8. (Switzerland) Peter de Cruz	9. (Manitoba) Mike McEwen
6	9. (Manitoba) ~~Mike McEwen~~; 10. (Scotland) Ross Paterson	10. (Switzerland) ~~Peter de Cruz~~; 11. (Scotland) ~~Ross Paterson~~; 12. (Scotland) ~~Ross Whyte~~; 13. (Saskatchewan) Matt Dunstone
7	11. (Switzerland) ~~Yannick Schwaller~~; 12. (Saskatchewan) ~~Matt Dunstone~~; 13. (Ontario) Glenn Howard	14. (United States) ~~Korey Dropkin~~; 15. (Manitoba) Jason Gunnlaugson

Sponsor's exemption:

- (Saskatchewan) Kirk Muyres

Tour Challenge Tier 2 winner:

- (United States) Korey Dropkin

=== Women ===
Top women's teams as of December 16:

#	Order of Merit	Year-to-Date
1	1. (Sweden) Anna Hasselborg	1. (Manitoba) Tracy Fleury
2	2. (Manitoba) ~~Tracy Fleury~~; 3. (Switzerland) Silvana Tirinzoni	2. (Sweden) ~~Anna Hasselborg~~; 3. (Switzerland) ~~Silvana Tirinzoni~~; 4. (Japan) Satsuki Fujisawa
3	4. (Manitoba) Kerri Einarson	5. (Manitoba) ~~Kerri Einarson~~; 6. (Manitoba) Jennifer Jones
4	5. (Ontario) Rachel Homan	7. (Ontario) ~~Rachel Homan~~; 8. (Scotland) Eve Muirhead
5	6. (Manitoba) ~~Jennifer Jones~~; 7. (Japan) ~~Satsuki Fujisawa~~; 8. (Alberta) Chelsea Carey	9. (Switzerland) Elena Stern
6	9. (Scotland) ~~Eve Muirhead~~; 10. (Switzerland) ~~Elena Stern~~; 11. (Japan) Sayaka Yoshimura	10. (Alberta) ~~Chelsea Carey~~; 11. (Alberta) Kelsey Rocque
7	12. (Alberta) ~~Kelsey Rocque~~; 13. (United States) Team Roth	12. (Japan) ~~Sayaka Yoshimura~~; 13. (South Korea) ~~Gim Un-chi~~; 14. (United States) ~~Team Roth~~; 15. (Russia) Alina Kovaleva

Sponsor's exemption:

- (Alberta) Laura Walker

Tour Challenge Tier 2 winner:

- (South Korea) Kim Min-ji

== Men ==
=== Teams ===
The teams are listed as follows:

Skip	Third	Second	Lead	Alternate	Locale
Brendan Bottcher	Darren Moulding	Brad Thiessen	Karrick Martin		Edmonton, Alberta
Benoît Schwarz (Fourth)	Sven Michel	Peter de Cruz (Skip)	Valentin Tanner		Geneva, Switzerland
Korey Dropkin	Joe Polo	Mark Fenner	Thomas Howell	Alex Fenson	Chaska, United States
Matt Dunstone	Braeden Moskowy	Catlin Schneider	Dustin Kidby		Regina, Saskatchewan
Niklas Edin	Oskar Eriksson	Rasmus Wranå	Christoffer Sundgren		Karlstad, Sweden
John Epping	Ryan Fry	Mat Camm	Brent Laing		Toronto, Ontario
Jason Gunnlaugson	Alex Forrest	Adam Casey	Connor Njegovan		Winnipeg, Manitoba
Brad Gushue	Mark Nichols	Brett Gallant	Geoff Walker		St. John's, Newfoundland and Labrador
Glenn Howard	Scott Howard	David Mathers	Tim March		Penetanguishene, Ontario
Brad Jacobs	Marc Kennedy	E. J. Harnden	Ryan Harnden		Sault Ste. Marie, Ontario
Kevin Koe	B. J. Neufeld	Colton Flasch	Ben Hebert		Calgary, Alberta
Mike McEwen	Reid Carruthers	Derek Samagalski	Colin Hodgson		Winnipeg, Manitoba
Bruce Mouat	Grant Hardie	Bobby Lammie	Hammy McMillan Jr.		Edinburgh, Scotland
Kirk Muyres	Kevin Marsh	Dan Marsh	Dallan Muyres		Saskatoon, Saskatchewan
Ross Paterson	Kyle Waddell	Craig Waddell (Note: Craig Waddell is sparing for Team Paterson's second Duncan Menzies.)	Michael Goodfellow		Glasgow, Scotland
Yannick Schwaller	Michael Brunner	Romano Meier	Marcel Käufeler		Bern, Switzerland

=== Knockout brackets ===
==== A Event ====
A Event			Semifinals			Qualifier 1
1	(Ontario) Brad Jacobs	7
1	(Ontario) Glenn Howard	5	9	(Ontario) Brad Jacobs	7
2	(Switzerland) Yannick Schwaller	6	9	(Switzerland) Yannick Schwaller	3
2	(Manitoba) Mike McEwen	2				13	(Ontario) Brad Jacobs	5
3	(Scotland) Bruce Mouat	5				13	(United States) Korey Dropkin	3
3	(United States) Korey Dropkin	6	10	(United States) Korey Dropkin	5
4	(Sweden) Niklas Edin	4	10	(Saskatchewan) Matt Dunstone	4
4	(Saskatchewan) Matt Dunstone	10

A Event			Semifinals			Qualifier 2
5	(Ontario) John Epping	5
5	(Saskatchewan) Kirk Muyres	4	11	(Ontario) John Epping	1
6	(Alberta) Kevin Koe	7	11	(Alberta) Kevin Koe	7
6	(Switzerland) Peter de Cruz	4				14	(Alberta) Kevin Koe	6
7	(Newfoundland and Labrador) Brad Gushue	6				14	(Newfoundland and Labrador) Brad Gushue	8
7	(Manitoba) Jason Gunnlaugson	2	12	(Newfoundland and Labrador) Brad Gushue	8
8	(Alberta) Brendan Bottcher	5	12	(Scotland) Ross Paterson	3
8	(Scotland) Ross Paterson	7

==== B Event ====
B Event			Semifinals			Qualifier 3
15	(Ontario) Glenn Howard	3
15	(Manitoba) Mike McEwen	8	19	(Manitoba) Mike McEwen	6
16	(Scotland) Bruce Mouat	4	19	(Scotland) Bruce Mouat	5
16	(Sweden) Niklas Edin	3				23	(Manitoba) Mike McEwen	5
						23	(Alberta) Kevin Koe	4

B Event			Semifinals			Qualifier 4
17	(Saskatchewan) Kirk Muyres	2
17	(Switzerland) Peter de Cruz	6	20	(Switzerland) Peter de Cruz	6
18	(Manitoba) Jason Gunnlaugson	1	20	(Alberta) Brendan Bottcher	2
18	(Alberta) Brendan Bottcher	8				24	(Switzerland) Peter de Cruz	4
						24	(United States) Korey Dropkin	7

B Event			Qualifier 5
21	(Switzerland) Yannick Schwaller	3
21	(Saskatchewan) Matt Dunstone	7	25	(Saskatchewan) Matt Dunstone	5
22	(Ontario) John Epping	6	25	(Ontario) John Epping	6
22	(Scotland) Ross Paterson	3

==== C Event ====
C Event			Semifinals			Qualifier 6
26	(Ontario) Glenn Howard	4
26	(Sweden) Niklas Edin	1	28	(Ontario) Glenn Howard	7
			28	(Scotland) Ross Paterson	3
						31	(Ontario) Glenn Howard	8
						31	(Switzerland) Peter de Cruz	6

C Event			Semifinals			Qualifier 7
27	(Saskatchewan) Kirk Muyres	3
27	(Manitoba) Jason Gunnlaugson	5	29	(Manitoba) Jason Gunnlaugson	6
			29	(Switzerland) Yannick Schwaller	7
						32	(Switzerland) Yannick Schwaller	7
						32	(Alberta) Kevin Koe	4

C Event			Qualifier 8
30	(Scotland) Bruce Mouat	6
30	(Alberta) Brendan Bottcher	2	33	(Scotland) Bruce Mouat	4
			33	(Saskatchewan) Matt Dunstone	3

=== Knockout results ===
All draw times are listed in Central Time (UTC−06:00).

==== Draw 1 ====
Tuesday, January 14, 7:00 pm

Sheet A	1	2	3	4	5	6	7	8	Final
(Ontario) Brad Jacobs	0	3	0	1	0	1	0	2	7
(Ontario) Glenn Howard 🔨	2	0	0	0	1	0	2	0	5

Sheet B	1	2	3	4	5	6	7	8	Final
(Switzerland) Yannick Schwaller	0	0	0	2	0	1	3	X	6
(Manitoba) Mike McEwen 🔨	0	0	1	0	1	0	0	X	2

Sheet C	1	2	3	4	5	6	7	8	Final
(Alberta) Brendan Bottcher 🔨	0	0	1	0	2	1	1	0	5
(Scotland) Ross Paterson	0	2	0	4	0	0	0	1	7

Sheet D	1	2	3	4	5	6	7	8	Final
(Ontario) John Epping	0	0	2	0	2	1	0	0	5
(Saskatchewan) Kirk Muyres 🔨	0	1	0	1	0	0	1	1	4

Sheet E	1	2	3	4	5	6	7	8	Final
(Newfoundland and Labrador) Brad Gushue 🔨	0	2	0	2	1	0	1	X	6
(Manitoba) Jason Gunnlaugson	0	0	1	0	0	1	0	X	2

==== Draw 2 ====
Wednesday, January 15, 8:00 am

Sheet A	1	2	3	4	5	6	7	8	Final
(Scotland) Bruce Mouat	0	2	0	0	2	0	1	0	5
(United States) Korey Dropkin 🔨	1	0	2	2	0	0	0	1	6

Sheet D	1	2	3	4	5	6	7	8	Final
(Alberta) Kevin Koe	0	0	3	0	4	0	X	X	7
(Switzerland) Peter de Cruz 🔨	1	1	0	1	0	1	X	X	4

==== Draw 3 ====
Wednesday, January 15, 12:00 pm

Sheet A	1	2	3	4	5	6	7	8	Final
(Sweden) Niklas Edin 🔨	0	0	0	3	0	1	0	X	4
(Saskatchewan) Matt Dunstone	2	1	0	0	2	0	5	X	10

Sheet D	1	2	3	4	5	6	7	8	Final
(Ontario) Brad Jacobs 🔨	0	2	2	0	0	0	3	X	7
(Switzerland) Yannick Schwaller	0	0	0	1	1	1	0	X	3

==== Draw 4 ====
Wednesday, January 15, 4:00 pm

Sheet C	1	2	3	4	5	6	7	8	Final
(Ontario) John Epping	0	0	0	1	0	0	X	X	1
(Alberta) Kevin Koe 🔨	2	1	1	0	0	3	X	X	7

Sheet D	1	2	3	4	5	6	7	8	Final
(Newfoundland and Labrador) Brad Gushue	0	3	0	0	1	0	2	2	8
(Scotland) Ross Paterson 🔨	1	0	0	1	0	1	0	0	3

Sheet E	1	2	3	4	5	6	7	8	Final
(Ontario) Glenn Howard	0	1	0	0	2	0	0	X	3
(Manitoba) Mike McEwen 🔨	1	0	1	2	0	3	1	X	8

==== Draw 5 ====
Wednesday, January 15, 8:00 pm

Sheet A	1	2	3	4	5	6	7	8	Final
(Saskatchewan) Kirk Muyres	0	0	0	2	0	0	0	X	2
(Switzerland) Peter de Cruz 🔨	0	2	0	0	2	0	2	X	6

Sheet B	1	2	3	4	5	6	7	8	Final
(Manitoba) Jason Gunnlaugson	0	0	1	0	0	X	X	X	1
(Alberta) Brendan Bottcher 🔨	2	0	0	5	1	X	X	X	8

Sheet E	1	2	3	4	5	6	7	8	Final
(United States) Korey Dropkin 🔨	0	1	0	1	0	2	0	1	5
(Saskatchewan) Matt Dunstone	0	0	2	0	1	0	1	0	4

==== Draw 7 ====
Thursday, January 16, 12:00 pm

Sheet A	1	2	3	4	5	6	7	8	Final
(Switzerland) Yannick Schwaller 🔨	0	1	1	0	1	0	0	0	3
(Saskatchewan) Matt Dunstone	2	0	0	1	0	0	2	2	7

Sheet B	1	2	3	4	5	6	7	8	Final
(Alberta) Kevin Koe	0	2	0	2	0	2	0	0	6
(Newfoundland and Labrador) Brad Gushue 🔨	2	0	2	0	2	0	1	1	8

Sheet C	1	2	3	4	5	6	7	8	Final
(Ontario) Brad Jacobs 🔨	0	2	0	0	2	0	0	1	5
(United States) Korey Dropkin	0	0	1	1	0	0	1	0	3

Sheet D	1	2	3	4	5	6	7	8	Final
(Switzerland) Peter de Cruz	1	0	1	1	3	0	X	X	6
(Alberta) Brendan Bottcher 🔨	0	1	0	0	0	1	X	X	2

Sheet E	1	2	3	4	5	6	7	8	Final
(Scotland) Bruce Mouat 🔨	0	1	0	1	0	1	0	1	4
(Sweden) Niklas Edin	0	0	1	0	1	0	1	0	3

==== Draw 9 ====
Thursday, January 16, 8:00 pm

Sheet A	1	2	3	4	5	6	7	8	Final
(Ontario) John Epping 🔨	1	0	0	1	1	0	3	X	6
(Scotland) Ross Paterson	0	1	1	0	0	1	0	X	3

Sheet B	1	2	3	4	5	6	7	8	Final
(Switzerland) Peter de Cruz	0	2	0	0	2	0	0	0	4
(United States) Korey Dropkin 🔨	1	0	0	3	0	1	1	1	7

Sheet C	1	2	3	4	5	6	7	8	Final
(Manitoba) Mike McEwen	0	0	2	0	2	0	0	2	6
(Scotland) Bruce Mouat 🔨	1	1	0	2	0	1	0	0	5

Sheet D	1	2	3	4	5	6	7	8	Final
(Ontario) Glenn Howard	0	1	1	0	1	0	1	X	4
(Sweden) Niklas Edin 🔨	0	0	0	0	0	1	0	X	1

Sheet E	1	2	3	4	5	6	7	8	Final
(Saskatchewan) Kirk Muyres	0	1	0	0	0	1	0	1	3
(Manitoba) Jason Gunnlaugson 🔨	2	0	1	0	1	0	1	0	5

==== Draw 11 ====
Friday, January 17, 12:00 pm

Sheet A	1	2	3	4	5	6	7	8	Final
(Scotland) Bruce Mouat	0	2	0	1	0	0	3	X	6
(Alberta) Brendan Bottcher 🔨	1	0	0	0	1	0	0	X	2

Sheet B	1	2	3	4	5	6	7	8	Final
(Saskatchewan) Matt Dunstone 🔨	1	1	0	0	1	0	2	0	5
(Ontario) John Epping	0	0	2	0	0	2	0	2	6

Sheet C	1	2	3	4	5	6	7	8	9	Final
(Manitoba) Jason Gunnlaugson 🔨	2	0	2	1	0	0	0	1	0	6
(Switzerland) Yannick Schwaller	0	2	0	0	2	1	1	0	1	7

Sheet D	1	2	3	4	5	6	7	8	9	Final
(Manitoba) Mike McEwen	0	1	0	0	2	0	0	1	1	5
(Alberta) Kevin Koe 🔨	3	0	1	0	0	0	0	0	0	4

Sheet E	1	2	3	4	5	6	7	8	Final
(Ontario) Glenn Howard 🔨	0	1	0	3	0	3	0	X	7
(Scotland) Ross Paterson	0	0	1	0	2	0	0	X	3

==== Draw 13 ====
Friday, January 17, 8:00 pm

Sheet B	1	2	3	4	5	6	7	8	Final
(Switzerland) Yannick Schwaller	2	0	1	1	0	0	3	X	7
(Alberta) Kevin Koe	0	2	0	0	1	1	0	X	4

Sheet C	1	2	3	4	5	6	7	8	Final
(Ontario) Glenn Howard	2	0	2	0	2	1	0	1	8
(Switzerland) Peter de Cruz	0	3	0	2	0	0	1	0	6

Sheet D	1	2	3	4	5	6	7	8	Final
(Scotland) Bruce Mouat	2	0	0	0	1	0	0	1	4
(Saskatchewan) Matt Dunstone	0	1	0	0	0	2	0	0	3

=== Playoffs ===
Quarterfinals
A1	(Ontario) Brad Jacobs	8
C1	(Ontario) Glenn Howard	4
B1	(Manitoba) Mike McEwen	6
B2	(United States) Korey Dropkin	2
A2	(Newfoundland and Labrador) Brad Gushue	6
C2	(Switzerland) Yannick Schwaller	1
B3	(Ontario) John Epping	8
C3	(Scotland) Bruce Mouat	3

Semifinals
A1	(Ontario) Brad Jacobs	6
B1	(Manitoba) Mike McEwen	3
A2	(Newfoundland and Labrador) Brad Gushue	4
B3	(Ontario) John Epping	7

Final
A1	(Ontario) Brad Jacobs	6
B3	(Ontario) John Epping	5

==== Quarterfinals ====
Saturday, January 18, 11:00 am

Sheet A	1	2	3	4	5	6	7	8	Final
(Manitoba) Mike McEwen 🔨	0	1	0	1	1	0	3	X	6
(United States) Korey Dropkin	0	0	0	0	0	2	0	X	2

Player percentages
(Manitoba) Team McEwen		(United States) Team Dropkin	
Colin Hodgson	93%	Thomas Howell	95%
Derek Samagalski	94%	Mark Fenner	90%
Reid Carruthers	100%	Joe Polo	77%
Mike McEwen	82%	Korey Dropkin	88%
Total	92%	Total	87%

Sheet B	1	2	3	4	5	6	7	8	Final
(Newfoundland and Labrador) Brad Gushue 🔨	0	2	1	2	0	1	X	X	6
(Switzerland) Yannick Schwaller	0	0	0	0	1	0	X	X	1

Player percentages
(Newfoundland and Labrador) Team Gushue		(Switzerland) Team Schwaller	
Geoff Walker	94%	Marcel Käufeler	91%
Brett Gallant	100%	Romano Meier	74%
Mark Nichols	100%	Michael Brunner	92%
Brad Gushue	90%	Yannick Schwaller	63%
Total	96%	Total	80%

Sheet C	1	2	3	4	5	6	7	8	Final
(Ontario) John Epping 🔨	2	0	3	0	3	X	X	X	8
(Scotland) Bruce Mouat	0	2	0	1	0	X	X	X	3

Player percentages
(Ontario) Team Epping		(Scotland) Team Mouat	
Brent Laing	82%	Hammy McMillan Jr.	83%
Mat Camm	80%	Bobby Lammie	81%
Ryan Fry	80%	Grant Hardie	80%
John Epping	91%	Bruce Mouat	66%
Total	83%	Total	77%

Sheet D	1	2	3	4	5	6	7	8	Final
(Ontario) Brad Jacobs 🔨	1	4	0	1	0	0	2	X	8
(Ontario) Glenn Howard	0	0	2	0	1	1	0	X	4

Player percentages
(Ontario) Team Jacobs		(Ontario) Team Howard	
Ryan Harnden	84%	Tim March	86%
E. J. Harnden	80%	David Mathers	74%
Marc Kennedy	87%	Scott Howard	63%
Brad Jacobs	76%	Glenn Howard	63%
Total	82%	Total	72%

==== Semifinals ====
Saturday, January 18, 7:00 pm

Sheet C	1	2	3	4	5	6	7	8	Final
(Ontario) Brad Jacobs 🔨	2	0	1	0	2	1	0	X	6
(Manitoba) Mike McEwen	0	1	0	1	0	0	1	X	3

Player percentages
(Ontario) Team Jacobs		(Manitoba) Team McEwen	
Ryan Harnden	87%	Colin Hodgson	94%
E. J. Harnden	98%	Derek Samagalski	91%
Marc Kennedy	100%	Reid Carruthers	70%
Brad Jacobs	92%	Mike McEwen	84%
Total	94%	Total	85%

Sheet D	1	2	3	4	5	6	7	8	Final
(Newfoundland and Labrador) Brad Gushue 🔨	0	0	1	0	2	1	0	X	4
(Ontario) John Epping	0	1	0	2	0	0	4	X	7

Player percentages
(Newfoundland and Labrador) Team Gushue		(Ontario) Team Epping	
Geoff Walker	94%	Brent Laing	76%
Brett Gallant	82%	Mat Camm	87%
Mark Nichols	79%	Ryan Fry	80%
Brad Gushue	86%	John Epping	96%
Total	85%	Total	85%

==== Final ====
Sunday, January 19, 2:30 pm

Sheet C	1	2	3	4	5	6	7	8	Final
(Ontario) Brad Jacobs 🔨	2	0	2	0	1	0	0	1	6
(Ontario) John Epping	0	0	0	1	0	2	2	0	5

Player percentages
(Ontario) Team Jacobs		(Ontario) Team Epping	
Ryan Harnden	93%	Brent Laing	95%
E. J. Harnden	93%	Mat Camm	88%
Marc Kennedy	90%	Ryan Fry	84%
Brad Jacobs	78%	John Epping	82%
Total	89%	Total	88%

== Women ==
=== Teams ===
The teams are listed as follows:

Skip	Third	Second	Lead	Alternate	Locale
Chelsea Carey	Sarah Wilkes	Dana Ferguson	Rachelle Brown		Calgary, Alberta
Kerri Einarson	Val Sweeting	Shannon Birchard	Briane Meilleur		Gimli, Manitoba
Tracy Fleury	Selena Njegovan	Liz Fyfe	Kristin MacCuish		East St. Paul, Manitoba
Satsuki Fujisawa	Chinami Yoshida	Yumi Suzuki	Yurika Yoshida		Kitami, Japan
Anna Hasselborg	Sara McManus	Agnes Knochenhauer	Sofia Mabergs		Sundbyberg, Sweden
Rachel Homan	Emma Miskew	Joanne Courtney	Lisa Weagle		Ottawa, Ontario
Jennifer Jones	Kaitlyn Lawes	Jocelyn Peterman	Dawn McEwen		Winnipeg, Manitoba
Kim Min-ji	Ha Seung-youn	Kim Hye-rin	Kim Su-jin	Yang Tae-i	Chuncheon, South Korea
Alina Kovaleva	Maria Komarova	Galina Arsenkina	Ekaterina Kuzmina		Saint Petersburg, Russia
Eve Muirhead	Lauren Gray	Jennifer Dodds	Vicky Wright		Stirling, Scotland
Kelsey Rocque	Danielle Schmiemann	Becca Hebert	Jesse Marlow		Edmonton, Alberta
Tabitha Peterson (Note: Tabitha Peterson is skipping Team Roth with Nina Roth on maternity leave.)	Becca Hamilton	Tara Peterson	Aileen Geving		McFarland, United States
Briar Hürlimann (Fourth)	Elena Stern (Skip)	Lisa Gisler	Céline Koller		Brig, Switzerland
Alina Pätz (Fourth)	Silvana Tirinzoni (Skip)	Esther Neuenschwander	Melanie Barbezat		Aarau, Switzerland
Laura Walker	Kate Cameron	Taylor McDonald	Nadine Scotland		Edmonton, Alberta
Sayaka Yoshimura	Kaho Onodera	Anna Ohmiya	Yumie Funayama		Sapporo, Japan

=== Knockout brackets ===
==== A Event ====
A Event			Semifinals			Qualifier 1
1	(Manitoba) Tracy Fleury	4
1	(South Korea) Kim Min-ji	3	9	(Manitoba) Tracy Fleury	3
2	(Scotland) Eve Muirhead	6	9	(Scotland) Eve Muirhead	5
2	(Switzerland) Elena Stern	4				13	(Scotland) Eve Muirhead	5
3	(Japan) Satsuki Fujisawa	5				13	(Manitoba) Kerri Einarson	6
3	(Japan) Sayaka Yoshimura	4	10	(Japan) Satsuki Fujisawa	3
4	(Manitoba) Kerri Einarson	6	10	(Manitoba) Kerri Einarson	8
4	(Alberta) Kelsey Rocque	5

A Event			Semifinals			Qualifier 2
5	(Sweden) Anna Hasselborg	6
5	(Alberta) Laura Walker	5	11	(Sweden) Anna Hasselborg	7
6	(Ontario) Rachel Homan	6	11	(Ontario) Rachel Homan	5
6	(Alberta) Chelsea Carey	3				14	(Sweden) Anna Hasselborg	5
7	(Switzerland) Silvana Tirinzoni	4				14	(United States) Team Roth	6
7	(United States) Team Roth	6	12	(United States) Team Roth	7
8	(Manitoba) Jennifer Jones	5	12	(Russia) Alina Kovaleva	6
8	(Russia) Alina Kovaleva	6

==== B Event ====
B Event			Semifinals			Qualifier 3
15	(South Korea) Kim Min-ji	4
15	(Switzerland) Elena Stern	5	19	(Switzerland) Elena Stern	6
16	(Japan) Sayaka Yoshimura	5	19	(Japan) Sayaka Yoshimura	5
16	(Alberta) Kelsey Rocque	4				23	(Switzerland) Elena Stern	4
						23	(Sweden) Anna Hasselborg	6

B Event			Semifinals			Qualifier 4
17	(Alberta) Laura Walker	4
17	(Alberta) Chelsea Carey	6	20	(Alberta) Chelsea Carey	3
18	(Switzerland) Silvana Tirinzoni	5	20	(Manitoba) Jennifer Jones	8
18	(Manitoba) Jennifer Jones	6				24	(Manitoba) Jennifer Jones	6
						24	(Scotland) Eve Muirhead	4

B Event			Qualifier 5
21	(Manitoba) Tracy Fleury	6
21	(Japan) Satsuki Fujisawa	8	25	(Japan) Satsuki Fujisawa	3
22	(Ontario) Rachel Homan	6	25	(Russia) Alina Kovaleva	7
22	(Russia) Alina Kovaleva	8

==== C Event ====
C Event			Semifinals			Qualifier 6
26	(South Korea) Kim Min-ji	8
26	(Alberta) Kelsey Rocque	2	28	(South Korea) Kim Min-ji	7
			28	(Ontario) Rachel Homan	4
						31	(South Korea) Kim Min-ji	6
						31	(Scotland) Eve Muirhead	5

C Event			Semifinals			Qualifier 7
27	(Alberta) Laura Walker	3
27	(Switzerland) Silvana Tirinzoni	7	29	(Switzerland) Silvana Tirinzoni	7
			29	(Manitoba) Tracy Fleury	5
						32	(Switzerland) Silvana Tirinzoni	8
						32	(Switzerland) Elena Stern	4

C Event			Qualifier 8
30	(Japan) Sayaka Yoshimura	1
30	(Alberta) Chelsea Carey	7	33	(Alberta) Chelsea Carey	3
			33	(Japan) Satsuki Fujisawa	7

=== Knockout results ===
All draw times are listed in Central Time (UTC−06:00).

==== Draw 2 ====
Wednesday, January 15, 8:00 am

Sheet B	1	2	3	4	5	6	7	8	Final
(Japan) Satsuki Fujisawa	0	1	1	1	0	0	2	0	5
(Japan) Sayaka Yoshimura 🔨	2	0	0	0	0	1	0	1	4

Sheet C	1	2	3	4	5	6	7	8	Final
(Manitoba) Tracy Fleury	3	0	0	0	1	0	0	X	4
(South Korea) Kim Min-ji 🔨	0	1	0	1	0	1	0	X	3

Sheet E	1	2	3	4	5	6	7	8	Final
(Switzerland) Silvana Tirinzoni	0	1	0	1	0	2	0	0	4
(United States) Team Roth 🔨	1	0	2	0	1	0	1	1	6

==== Draw 3 ====
Wednesday, January 15, 12:00 pm

Sheet B	1	2	3	4	5	6	7	8	9	Final
(Manitoba) Kerri Einarson 🔨	0	2	0	1	0	2	0	0	1	6
(Alberta) Kelsey Rocque	0	0	2	0	2	0	0	1	0	5

Sheet C	1	2	3	4	5	6	7	8	Final
(Scotland) Eve Muirhead	0	3	0	0	2	0	0	1	6
(Switzerland) Elena Stern 🔨	1	0	1	1	0	1	0	0	4

Sheet E	1	2	3	4	5	6	7	8	Final
(Manitoba) Jennifer Jones 🔨	2	0	1	0	0	0	2	0	5
(Russia) Alina Kovaleva	0	1	0	1	1	1	0	2	6

==== Draw 4 ====
Wednesday, January 15, 4:00 pm

Sheet A	1	2	3	4	5	6	7	8	Final
(Sweden) Anna Hasselborg	0	0	0	3	0	0	0	3	6
(Alberta) Laura Walker 🔨	0	1	1	0	1	1	1	0	5

Sheet B	1	2	3	4	5	6	7	8	Final
(Ontario) Rachel Homan 🔨	2	0	2	0	0	1	1	X	6
(Alberta) Chelsea Carey	0	1	0	0	2	0	0	X	3

==== Draw 5 ====
Wednesday, January 15, 8:00 pm

Sheet C	1	2	3	4	5	6	7	8	Final
(Japan) Satsuki Fujisawa	1	0	1	1	0	0	X	X	3
(Manitoba) Kerri Einarson 🔨	0	4	0	0	3	1	X	X	8

Sheet D	1	2	3	4	5	6	7	8	Final
(Manitoba) Tracy Fleury 🔨	0	0	1	0	0	2	0	0	3
(Scotland) Eve Muirhead	0	0	0	1	0	0	2	2	5

==== Draw 6 ====
Thursday, January 16, 8:00 am

Sheet A	1	2	3	4	5	6	7	8	9	Final
(Switzerland) Silvana Tirinzoni 🔨	0	1	1	0	0	1	0	2	0	5
(Manitoba) Jennifer Jones	1	0	0	1	1	0	2	0	1	6

Sheet B	1	2	3	4	5	6	7	8	Final
(United States) Team Roth 🔨	2	0	0	3	0	1	0	1	7
(Russia) Alina Kovaleva	0	2	0	0	2	0	2	0	6

Sheet C	1	2	3	4	5	6	7	8	9	Final
(Japan) Sayaka Yoshimura	0	1	0	0	1	1	1	0	1	5
(Alberta) Kelsey Rocque 🔨	1	0	0	1	0	0	0	2	0	4

Sheet D	1	2	3	4	5	6	7	8	Final
(Sweden) Anna Hasselborg	0	0	1	2	0	0	2	2	7
(Ontario) Rachel Homan 🔨	1	0	0	0	2	2	0	0	5

Sheet E	1	2	3	4	5	6	7	8	Final
(South Korea) Kim Min-ji	0	1	1	1	0	0	1	0	4
(Switzerland) Elena Stern 🔨	1	0	0	0	2	1	0	1	5

==== Draw 8 ====
Thursday, January 16, 4:00 pm

Sheet A	1	2	3	4	5	6	7	8	Final
(Manitoba) Tracy Fleury	1	0	2	0	2	0	1	X	6
(Japan) Satsuki Fujisawa 🔨	0	2	0	3	0	3	0	X	8

Sheet B	1	2	3	4	5	6	7	8	Final
(Scotland) Eve Muirhead 🔨	1	0	1	0	2	1	0	0	5
(Manitoba) Kerri Einarson	0	1	0	2	0	0	0	3	6

Sheet C	1	2	3	4	5	6	7	8	9	Final
(Sweden) Anna Hasselborg 🔨	0	3	0	0	1	0	0	1	0	5
(United States) Team Roth	1	0	0	1	0	2	1	0	1	6

Sheet D	1	2	3	4	5	6	7	8	Final
(Alberta) Laura Walker 🔨	2	0	0	1	0	0	1	0	4
(Alberta) Chelsea Carey	0	2	1	0	0	2	0	1	6

Sheet E	1	2	3	4	5	6	7	8	Final
(Ontario) Rachel Homan	0	0	3	0	2	1	0	0	6
(Russia) Alina Kovaleva 🔨	2	2	0	2	0	0	1	1	8

==== Draw 10 ====
Friday, January 17, 8:00 am

Sheet A	1	2	3	4	5	6	7	8	Final
(Switzerland) Elena Stern 🔨	0	2	0	0	2	0	1	1	6
(Japan) Sayaka Yoshimura	0	0	2	1	0	2	0	0	5

Sheet B	1	2	3	4	5	6	7	8	Final
(Japan) Satsuki Fujisawa	0	1	0	2	0	0	0	X	3
(Russia) Alina Kovaleva 🔨	1	0	1	0	0	4	1	X	7

Sheet C	1	2	3	4	5	6	7	8	Final
(Alberta) Chelsea Carey 🔨	0	0	2	0	1	0	X	X	3
(Manitoba) Jennifer Jones	0	2	0	3	0	3	X	X	8

Sheet D	1	2	3	4	5	6	7	8	Final
(South Korea) Kim Min-ji	4	0	2	1	1	X	X	X	8
(Alberta) Kelsey Rocque 🔨	0	2	0	0	0	X	X	X	2

Sheet E	1	2	3	4	5	6	7	8	Final
(Alberta) Laura Walker 🔨	0	0	1	0	1	1	0	0	3
(Switzerland) Silvana Tirinzoni	0	1	0	1	0	0	3	2	7

==== Draw 12 ====
Friday, January 17, 4:00 pm

Sheet A	1	2	3	4	5	6	7	8	Final
(South Korea) Kim Min-ji	0	2	0	0	2	0	3	X	7
(Ontario) Rachel Homan 🔨	1	0	1	0	0	2	0	X	4

Sheet B	1	2	3	4	5	6	7	8	Final
(Switzerland) Elena Stern	0	1	1	0	1	1	0	0	4
(Sweden) Anna Hasselborg 🔨	2	0	0	2	0	0	1	1	6

Sheet C	1	2	3	4	5	6	7	8	Final
(Switzerland) Silvana Tirinzoni	0	0	1	1	1	0	0	4	7
(Manitoba) Tracy Fleury 🔨	3	0	0	0	0	1	1	0	5

Sheet D	1	2	3	4	5	6	7	8	Final
(Japan) Sayaka Yoshimura	0	0	0	0	1	0	0	X	1
(Alberta) Chelsea Carey 🔨	1	0	0	2	0	2	2	X	7

Sheet E	1	2	3	4	5	6	7	8	Final
(Manitoba) Jennifer Jones	0	1	0	0	3	0	2	X	6
(Scotland) Eve Muirhead 🔨	1	0	0	2	0	1	0	X	4

==== Draw 14 ====
Saturday, January 18, 7:30 am

Sheet B	1	2	3	4	5	6	7	8	Final
(South Korea) Kim Min-ji 🔨	1	0	2	0	1	0	1	1	6
(Scotland) Eve Muirhead	0	2	0	1	0	2	0	0	5

Sheet C	1	2	3	4	5	6	7	8	Final
(Alberta) Chelsea Carey	0	2	0	1	0	0	0	X	3
(Japan) Satsuki Fujisawa 🔨	1	0	2	0	2	1	1	X	7

Sheet D	1	2	3	4	5	6	7	8	Final
(Switzerland) Silvana Tirinzoni 🔨	2	1	0	0	1	0	3	1	8
(Switzerland) Elena Stern	0	0	2	0	0	2	0	0	4

=== Playoffs ===
Quarterfinals
A1	(Manitoba) Kerri Einarson	4
C1	(South Korea) Kim Min-ji	5
B2	(Manitoba) Jennifer Jones	7
B3	(Russia) Alina Kovaleva	9
A2	(United States) Team Roth	5
C3	(Japan) Satsuki Fujisawa	6
B1	(Sweden) Anna Hasselborg	7
C2	(Switzerland) Silvana Tirinzoni	3

Semifinals
C1	(South Korea) Kim Min-ji	7
B3	(Russia) Alina Kovaleva	1
C3	(Japan) Satsuki Fujisawa	5
B1	(Sweden) Anna Hasselborg	10

Final
C1	(South Korea) Kim Min-ji	5
B1	(Sweden) Anna Hasselborg	7

==== Quarterfinals ====
Saturday, January 18, 3:00 pm

Sheet A	1	2	3	4	5	6	7	8	9	Final
(Manitoba) Kerri Einarson 🔨	1	0	0	1	0	1	0	1	0	4
(South Korea) Kim Min-ji	0	2	1	0	0	0	1	0	1	5

Player percentages
(Manitoba) Team Einarson		(South Korea) Team Kim	
Briane Meilleur	80%	Kim Su-jin	94%
Shannon Birchard	88%	Kim Hye-rin	89%
Val Sweeting	86%	Ha Seung-youn	76%
Kerri Einarson	70%	Kim Min-ji	74%
Total	81%	Total	83%

Sheet B	1	2	3	4	5	6	7	8	Final
(United States) Team Roth 🔨	1	0	0	2	0	0	0	2	5
(Japan) Satsuki Fujisawa	0	1	1	0	2	1	1	0	6

Player percentages
(United States) Team Roth		(Japan) Team Fujisawa	
Aileen Geving	89%	Yurika Yoshida	96%
Tara Peterson	83%	Yumi Suzuki	70%
Becca Hamilton	81%	Chinami Yoshida	97%
Tabitha Peterson	58%	Satsuki Fujisawa	82%
Total	77%	Total	86%

Sheet C	1	2	3	4	5	6	7	8	Final
(Sweden) Anna Hasselborg 🔨	0	2	1	1	3	0	X	X	7
(Switzerland) Silvana Tirinzoni	1	0	0	0	0	2	X	X	3

Player percentages
(Sweden) Team Hasselborg		(Switzerland) Team Tirinzoni	
Sofia Mabergs	84%	Melanie Barbezat	86%
Agnes Knochenhauer	69%	Esther Neuenschwander	66%
Sara McManus	74%	Silvana Tirinzoni	64%
Anna Hasselborg	75%	Alina Pätz	51%
Total	76%	Total	66%

Sheet D	1	2	3	4	5	6	7	8	Final
(Manitoba) Jennifer Jones	0	1	0	0	4	0	2	0	7
(Russia) Alina Kovaleva 🔨	2	0	1	2	0	1	0	3	9

Player percentages
(Manitoba) Team Jones		(Russia) Team Kovaleva	
Dawn McEwen	77%	Ekaterina Kuzmina	80%
Jocelyn Peterman	73%	Galina Arsenkina	67%
Kaitlyn Lawes	81%	Maria Komarova	59%
Jennifer Jones	64%	Alina Kovaleva	86%
Total	74%	Total	73%

==== Semifinals ====
Saturday, January 18, 7:00 pm

Sheet A	1	2	3	4	5	6	7	8	Final
(Japan) Satsuki Fujisawa	2	0	1	1	0	1	0	0	5
(Sweden) Anna Hasselborg 🔨	0	3	0	0	2	0	2	3	10

Player percentages
(Japan) Team Fujisawa		(Sweden) Team Hasselborg	
Yurika Yoshida	91%	Sofia Mabergs	80%
Yumi Suzuki	70%	Agnes Knochenhauer	83%
Chinami Yoshida	76%	Sara McManus	90%
Satsuki Fujisawa	71%	Anna Hasselborg	78%
Total	77%	Total	83%

Sheet B	1	2	3	4	5	6	7	8	Final
(South Korea) Kim Min-ji	0	0	0	2	3	2	X	X	7
(Russia) Alina Kovaleva 🔨	0	0	1	0	0	0	X	X	1

Player percentages
(South Korea) Team Kim		(Russia) Team Kovaleva	
Kim Su-jin	91%	Ekaterina Kuzmina	87%
Kim Hye-rin	80%	Galina Arsenkina	84%
Ha Seung-youn	79%	Maria Komarova	58%
Kim Min-ji	83%	Alina Kovaleva	62%
Total	83%	Total	73%

==== Final ====
Sunday, January 19, 11:00 am

Sheet C	1	2	3	4	5	6	7	8	9	Final
(South Korea) Kim Min-ji	0	1	0	1	0	2	0	1	0	5
(Sweden) Anna Hasselborg 🔨	2	0	1	0	1	0	1	0	2	7

Player percentages
(South Korea) Team Kim		(Sweden) Team Hasselborg	
Kim Su-jin	75%	Sofia Mabergs	89%
Kim Hye-rin	70%	Agnes Knochenhauer	75%
Ha Seung-youn	64%	Sara McManus	88%
Kim Min-ji	72%	Anna Hasselborg	88%
Total	70%	Total	85%
