= Becca Hebert =

Canadian curler

- Curler
- Born: Rebecca Konschuh; October 8, 1993 (age 33); Red Deer, Alberta

Team
- Curling club: Calgary CC, Calgary, AB

Curling career
- Member Association: Alberta (2009–2021; 2022–2024); Saskatchewan (2021–2022); Manitoba (2024–2025)
- Hearts: 1 (2025)
- Top CTRS ranking: 6th (2019–20)
Medal record
Women's curling
Representing Alberta
Canada Winter Games
Silver medal – second place	2011 Halifax

Rebecca Hebert (born October 8, 1993, in Red Deer as Rebecca Konschuh) is a Canadian curler from Calgary, Alberta.

== Career ==
=== Juniors ===
Hebert's junior team of Jocelyn Peterman, Brittany Tran and Kristine Anderson won a silver medal at the 2011 Canada Winter Games, losing to British Columbia's Corryn Brown in the final. The next season, the team represented Alberta at the 2012 Canadian Junior Curling Championships after winning the Alberta junior championship with a 7–1 record. At the championship, the team finished second through the round robin with a 10–2 record, only behind Manitoba's Shannon Birchard. They then won the semifinal against British Columbia's Kesa Van Osch to advance to the final against the Manitoba rink. After taking four in the fourth end, the Peterman rink stole five in the fifth, going on to win the game by a 12–6 score. This qualified the team to represent Canada at the 2012 World Junior Curling Championships. After posting a 6–3 round robin record, the team lost to Russia's Anna Sidorova in a tiebreaker match, thus failing to make the playoffs. The next season, the team failed to even make the Canadian Juniors, having not even made the playoffs in the Alberta playdowns. In 2014, her last year of junior eligibility, Hebert's team lost in the Alberta junior final to Kelsey Rocque, who would go on to win that year's World Junior championships.

Also throughout juniors, the Peterman team entered several World Curling Tour events, including the Curlers Corner Autumn Gold Curling Classic twice, which was a Grand Slam event at the time. They won just one match at the 2012 Curlers Corner Autumn Gold Curling Classic and went winless at the 2013 Curlers Corner Autumn Gold Curling Classic. They also reached the final of the 2013 Good Times Bonspiel where they lost to Cheryl Bernard.

=== Women's ===
Aged out of juniors, Hebert joined the Crystal Webster rink at lead for the 2014–15 season. After qualifying for the 2015 Alberta Scotties Tournament of Hearts through the Southern qualifier, the team lost in the C qualifier game to Chelsea Carey. This arrangement lasted just one season, however, with Hebert moving to join the Geri-Lynn Ramsay squad at second. This team saw less success as they failed to reach any playoffs on tour and did not qualify for the 2016 Alberta Scotties Tournament of Hearts. She then joined the Nadine Chyz rink at second for the 2016–17 season.

On tour, Team Chyz found success at multiple tour stops, beginning by winning the Avonair Cash Spiel at the start of the year. They then reached the final of the Medicine Hat Charity Classic before winning both the Crestwood Ladies Fall Classic and the Red Deer Curling Classic in November. The following month, the team won their fourth tour event of the season at the Curl Mesabi Classic. With all the point accumulated throughout the season, the team got an automatic spot at the 2017 Alberta Scotties Tournament of Hearts through their Alberta tour points. Despite being one of the favorites entering the provincial championship, they went 2–3 in the triple knockout and were eliminated in the C event semifinal. The following season, the team played in the 2017 GSOC Tour Challenge Tier 2 event, losing in a tiebreaker to Robyn Silvernagle. They also qualified for the 2017 Canadian Olympic Curling Pre-Trials where after a 3–3 round robin record, they won two tiebreakers to advance to the playoffs. They were then immediately eliminated by Julie Tippin in the first round. Elsewhere on tour, the team defended their title at the Avonair Cash Spiel with an undefeated record. At the 2018 Alberta Scotties Tournament of Hearts, they again lost in a C semifinal game to finish the event with a 3–3 record. The team then disbanded following the Alberta provincials with Hebert joining the new Kelsey Rocque rink at second for the 2018–19 season.

With Rocque, Hebert continued to find success on tour. The team only missed the playoffs at one event throughout the year and reached the final of the Prestige Hotels & Resorts Curling Classic where they lost to Alina Kovaleva. With three semifinal finishes and two quarterfinal appearances, Team Rocque secured enough points on the Alberta tour to qualify for the 2019 Alberta Scotties Tournament of Hearts. There, the team qualified for the playoffs through the B event and reached the final with a semifinal victory over Jodi Marthaller. Facing Chelsea Carey in the final, the team gave up four in the ninth end to lose the game 8–3. Team Rocque had a strong 2019–20 season, starting it off with a semifinal finish at the 2019 Cameron's Brewing Oakville Fall Classic. The team qualified for the playoffs at the 2019 Tour Challenge Grand Slam event where they lost to eventual winners Anna Hasselborg. Going into the 2020 Alberta Scotties Tournament of Hearts, Rocque was the number one seeded team, earning their spot through the CTRS points leader berth. They went 6–1 through the round robin, with their only loss to the Laura Walker. They would play Walker again in the 1 vs. 2 game where they lost 7–1. They had a strong semifinal game, able to easily defeat Krysta Hilker 8–1 setting up the third match for Rocque and Walker during the competition. The team struggled during the final, not able to figure out the ice and losing the final for the second straight year in a row. It would be the team's last event of the season as both the Players' Championship and the Champions Cup Grand Slam events were cancelled due to the COVID-19 pandemic. The team disbanded following the season.

After the COVID-19 pandemic cancelled the majority of the 2020–21 season, Hebert joined the Robyn Silvernagle rink out of Saskatchewan for the 2021–22 season as their alternate. With Silvernagle out on maternity leave for most of the year, second Jessie Hunkin took over skipping duties with Hebert coming in to throw second. Due to the COVID-19 pandemic in Canada, the qualification process for the 2021 Canadian Olympic Curling Trials had to be modified to qualify enough teams for the championship. In these modifications, Curling Canada created the 2021 Canadian Curling Pre-Trials Direct-Entry Event, an event where eight teams would compete to try to earn one of two spots into the 2021 Canadian Olympic Curling Pre-Trials. Team Silvernagle qualified for the Pre-Trials Direct-Entry Event as the third seed. The team qualified for the playoffs through the B Event, giving them two chances to secure a spot in the Pre-Trials. They then, however, lost 10–8 to Kerry Galusha and 8–6 to Jill Brothers, finishing third and not advancing. With Silvernagle back in the lineup, Hebert did not play for the rest of the season. Silvernagle then left the team following the season with Hebert joining full-time at second for the 2022–23 season.

In their third event, Team Hunkin reached the semifinals of the Prestige Hotels & Resorts Curling Classic, losing to Ikue Kitazawa. They then played in the 2022 Tour Challenge Tier 2 where after dropping their opening game, they ran the table to reach the final. There, they were defeated 8–2 by Clancy Grandy. After two more quarterfinal appearances, the team played in the 2023 Alberta Scotties Tournament of Hearts where they finished in fifth place with a 3–4 record. Third Kristen Streifel then left the team and was replaced by Jessie Haughian. To begin the 2023–24 season, the team had three consecutive quarterfinal appearances. Their best finish came at the Saville Grand Prix with a semifinal loss to Selena Sturmay. At the 2024 Alberta Scotties Tournament of Hearts, the team bettered their performance with a 4–3 record but did not qualify for the playoffs based on their draw-to-the-button total.

Following the dissolution of Team Hunkin, Hebert was announced as the alternate for the Kaitlyn Lawes rink from Manitoba for the 2024–25 season.

== Personal life ==
Hebert is employed as an event and conference consultant. She is married and has two children. She previously attended Mount Royal University and Sundre High School.

== Teams ==
Season	Skip	Third	Second	Lead	Alternate
2009–10	Jocelyn Peterman	Brittany Tran	Becca Konschuh	Kristine Anderson	
2010–11	Jocelyn Peterman	Brittany Tran	Becca Konschuh	Kristine Anderson	
2011–12	Jocelyn Peterman	Brittany Tran	Becca Konschuh	Kristine Anderson	
2012–13	Jocelyn Peterman	Brittany Tran	Becca Konschuh	Kristine Anderson	
2013–14	Jocelyn Peterman	Brittany Tran	Becca Konschuh	Kristine Anderson	
2014–15	Crystal Webster	Jessie Kaufman	Geri-Lynn Ramsay	Becca Konschuh	
2015–16	Geri-Lynn Ramsay	Brittany Tran	Becca Konschuh	Claire Murray	
2016–17	Nadine Chyz	Heather Jensen	Becca Konschuh	Heather Rogers	
2017–18	Nadine Scotland	Heather Jensen	Becca Konschuh	Heather Rogers	
2018–19	Kelsey Rocque	Danielle Schmiemann	Becca Konschuh	Jesse Iles	
2019–20	Kelsey Rocque	Danielle Schmiemann	Becca Hebert	Jesse Marlow	
2021–22	Robyn Silvernagle	Kristen Streifel	Jesse Hunkin	Dayna Demers	Becca Hebert
2022–23	Jessie Hunkin	Kristen Streifel	Becca Hebert	Dayna Demers	
2023–24	Jessie Hunkin	Jessie Haughian	Becca Hebert	Dayna Demmans	
2024–25	Kaitlyn Lawes	Selena Njegovan	Jocelyn Peterman	Kristin Gordon	Becca Hebert
