= 2022 Alberta Scotties Tournament of Hearts =

Curling championship

2022 Sentinel Storage Alberta Scotties Tournament of Hearts
- Host city: Grande Prairie, Alberta
- Arena: Bonnetts Energy Centre
- Dates: January 3–9
- Winner: Team Walker
- Curling club: Saville Community SC, Edmonton
- Skip: Laura Walker
- Third: Kate Cameron
- Second: Taylor McDonald
- Lead: Nadine Scotland
- Coach: Shannon Pynn
- Finalist: Casey Scheidegger

The 2022 Sentinel Storage Alberta Scotties Tournament of Hearts, the provincial women's curling championship for Alberta, was held January 3 to 9 at the Bonnetts Energy Centre in Grande Prairie, Alberta. The winning Laura Walker team represented Alberta at the 2022 Scotties Tournament of Hearts in Thunder Bay, Ontario, and finished with a 3–5 record. The event was held in conjunction with the 2022 Boston Pizza Cup, the provincial men's curling championship.

== Qualification process ==
Qualification method	Berths	Qualifying team(s)
Defending Champion	1	Laura Walker
CTRS Leaders	2	Kelsey Rocque; Casey Scheidegger
Excel Points Leader	1	Selena Sturmay
Fort Saskatchewan Qualifier	2	Adele Kezama-Purcell; Melissa Pierce
Vulcan Qualifier	2	Elysa Crough; Kayla Skrlik

== Teams ==
The teams are listed as follows:

Skip	Third	Second	Lead	Alternate	Club
Elysa Crough	Quinn Prodaniuk	Kim Bonneau	Julianna Mackenzie		Crestwood CC, Edmonton
Adele Kezama-Purcell	Deanne Nichol	Meghan Chateauvert	Heather Steele	Marianna Greenhough	St. Albert CC, St. Albert
Melissa Pierce	Jennifer Van Wieren	Megan Anderson	Kelly Erickson	Tiffany Game	Crestwood CC, Edmonton
Kelsey Rocque	Danielle Schmiemann	Dana Ferguson	Rachelle Brown		Saville Community SC, Edmonton
Casey Scheidegger	Cary-Anne McTaggart	Jessie Haughian	Kristie Moore	Susan O'Connor	Lethbridge CC, Lethbridge
Kayla Skrlik	Geri-Lynn Ramsay	Brittany Tran	Ashton Skrlik	Crystal Webster	Airdrie CC, Airdrie
Selena Sturmay	Abby Marks	Catherine Clifford	Paige Papley	Kate Goodhelpsen	Saville Community SC, Edmonton
Laura Walker	Kate Cameron	Taylor McDonald	Nadine Scotland		Saville Community SC, Edmonton

== Round-robin standings ==
Final round-robin standings

Key
Teams to Playoffs

Skip	W	L	PF	PA	EW	EL	BE	SE
Laura Walker	6	1	57	35	33	24	4	9
Casey Scheidegger	6	1	49	32	35	23	8	12
Kelsey Rocque	6	1	53	44	31	29	1	5
Adele Kezama-Purcell	3	4	39	44	25	24	5	8
Melissa Pierce	2	5	34	45	23	32	4	6
Elysa Crough	2	5	36	49	22	30	4	6
Selena Sturmay	2	5	47	51	30	29	1	9
Kayla Skrlik	1	6	37	52	24	32	4	6

== Round-robin results ==
All draw times are listed in Mountain Time (UTC-07:00).

=== Draw 1 ===
Monday, January 3, 9:00 am

Sheet A	1	2	3	4	5	6	7	8	9	10	Final
Adele Kezama-Purcell	0	0	0	1	0	2	0	1	0	X	4
Kelsey Rocque	3	0	1	0	2	0	2	0	1	X	9

Sheet B	1	2	3	4	5	6	7	8	9	10	Final
Elysa Crough	1	0	1	0	0	2	0	2	0	0	6
Laura Walker	0	2	0	0	3	0	1	0	0	1	7

Sheet C	1	2	3	4	5	6	7	8	9	10	Final
Casey Scheidegger	0	2	0	1	0	1	0	0	0	1	5
Kayla Skrlik	0	0	0	0	1	0	1	2	0	0	4

Sheet D	1	2	3	4	5	6	7	8	9	10	Final
Melissa Pierce	0	0	3	1	0	2	0	0	1	X	7
Selena Sturmay	0	0	0	0	1	0	1	2	0	X	4

=== Draw 2 ===
Monday, January 3, 7:00 pm

Sheet A	1	2	3	4	5	6	7	8	9	10	Final
Melissa Pierce	0	1	0	0	2	0	0	0	0	X	3
Laura Walker	0	0	1	1	0	1	1	2	1	X	7

Sheet B	1	2	3	4	5	6	7	8	9	10	11	Final
Kayla Skrlik	0	2	0	2	0	0	1	0	1	2	0	8
Selena Sturmay	1	0	1	0	2	2	0	2	0	0	1	9

Sheet C	1	2	3	4	5	6	7	8	9	10	Final
Elysa Crough	0	0	0	0	0	1	0	4	0	0	5
Kelsey Rocque	1	0	0	2	0	0	1	0	2	1	7

Sheet D	1	2	3	4	5	6	7	8	9	10	Final
Adele Kezama-Purcell	0	0	0	1	0	1	0	1	0	X	3
Casey Scheidegger	0	2	2	0	1	0	1	0	2	X	8

=== Draw 3 ===
Tuesday, January 4, 2:00 pm

Sheet A	1	2	3	4	5	6	7	8	9	10	Final
Elysa Crough	0	2	0	3	1	0	1	1	1	X	9
Selena Sturmay	1	0	2	0	0	3	0	0	0	X	6

Sheet B	1	2	3	4	5	6	7	8	9	10	Final
Melissa Pierce	1	0	0	0	2	0	1	0	0	0	4
Casey Scheidegger	0	1	1	1	0	1	0	1	1	1	7

Sheet C	1	2	3	4	5	6	7	8	9	10	Final
Adele Kezama-Purcell	0	2	0	0	3	0	0	2	0	X	7
Laura Walker	2	0	1	1	0	3	2	0	3	X	12

Sheet D	1	2	3	4	5	6	7	8	9	10	Final
Kelsey Rocque	1	0	2	0	2	0	2	0	0	3	10
Kayla Skrlik	0	1	0	1	0	2	0	3	2	0	9

=== Draw 4 ===
Wednesday, January 5, 9:00 am

Sheet A	1	2	3	4	5	6	7	8	9	10	Final
Melissa Pierce	0	1	0	3	0	0	1	0	0	X	5
Kayla Skrlik	2	0	1	0	0	3	0	1	0	X	7

Sheet C	1	2	3	4	5	6	7	8	9	10	Final
Casey Scheidegger	0	0	2	2	0	2	0	1	0	0	7
Selena Sturmay	0	1	0	0	1	0	1	0	3	0	6

=== Draw 5 ===
Wednesday, January 5, 2:00 pm

Sheet A	1	2	3	4	5	6	7	8	9	10	11	Final
Casey Scheidegger	0	2	1	0	0	1	0	2	1	0	1	8
Laura Walker	1	0	0	1	0	0	2	0	0	3	0	7

Sheet B	1	2	3	4	5	6	7	8	9	10	Final
Kelsey Rocque	0	1	0	3	0	1	0	4	0	0	9
Selena Sturmay	1	0	2	0	1	0	1	0	2	1	8

Sheet C	1	2	3	4	5	6	7	8	9	10	Final
Adele Kezama-Purcell	1	0	2	3	1	1	X	X	X	X	8
Melissa Pierce	0	1	0	0	0	0	X	X	X	X	1

Sheet D	1	2	3	4	5	6	7	8	9	10	Final
Elysa Crough	0	0	2	1	2	0	1	0	3	X	9
Kayla Skrlik	0	1	0	0	0	1	0	1	0	X	3

=== Draw 6 ===
Thursday, January 6, 2:00 pm

Sheet A	1	2	3	4	5	6	7	8	9	10	Final
Adele Kezama-Purcell	0	2	0	0	1	0	X	X	X	X	3
Selena Sturmay	2	0	4	1	0	3	X	X	X	X	10

Sheet B	1	2	3	4	5	6	7	8	9	10	Final
Elysa Crough	0	1	0	0	0	0	0	X	X	X	1
Casey Scheidegger	1	0	0	2	2	2	1	X	X	X	8

Sheet C	1	2	3	4	5	6	7	8	9	10	Final
Kayla Skrlik	0	0	0	1	0	3	0	0	X	X	4
Laura Walker	1	0	4	0	1	0	2	1	X	X	9

Sheet D	1	2	3	4	5	6	7	8	9	10	Final
Melissa Pierce	0	1	1	0	1	1	0	0	1	X	5
Kelsey Rocque	2	0	0	2	0	0	1	3	0	X	8

=== Draw 7 ===
Thursday, January 6, 7:00 pm

Sheet B	1	2	3	4	5	6	7	8	9	10	Final
Kelsey Rocque	0	0	1	0	1	0	0	1	0	X	3
Laura Walker	0	1	0	1	0	2	0	0	3	X	7

Sheet D	1	2	3	4	5	6	7	8	9	10	Final
Elysa Crough	0	0	0	0	2	0	0	X	X	X	2
Adele Kezama-Purcell	0	1	2	3	0	1	2	X	X	X	9

=== Draw 8 ===
Friday, January 7, 2:00 pm

Sheet A	1	2	3	4	5	6	7	8	9	10	Final
Kelsey Rocque	0	0	1	0	1	1	0	1	0	3	7
Casey Scheidegger	0	1	0	1	0	0	3	0	1	0	6

Sheet B	1	2	3	4	5	6	7	8	9	10	Final
Adele Kezama-Purcell	0	0	0	0	1	1	0	0	1	2	5
Kayla Skrlik	0	0	1	0	0	0	0	1	0	0	2

Sheet C	1	2	3	4	5	6	7	8	9	10	Final
Elysa Crough	0	0	0	1	0	1	2	0	0	X	4
Melissa Pierce	0	3	1	0	1	0	0	3	1	X	9

Sheet D	1	2	3	4	5	6	7	8	9	10	Final
Selena Sturmay	1	0	1	0	0	1	0	1	0	X	4
Laura Walker	0	1	0	3	0	0	2	0	2	X	8

== Playoffs ==
Semifinal			Final
			1	Laura Walker	6
2	Casey Scheidegger	10	2	Casey Scheidegger	5
3	Kelsey Rocque	7

=== Semifinal ===
Saturday, January 8, 2:30 pm

Sheet B	1	2	3	4	5	6	7	8	9	10	Final
Casey Scheidegger	2	2	1	0	2	0	0	3	0	X	10
Kelsey Rocque	0	0	0	2	0	2	1	0	2	X	7

=== Final ===
Sunday, January 9, 11:00 am

Sheet B	1	2	3	4	5	6	7	8	9	10	Final
Laura Walker	0	0	1	0	2	0	0	2	0	1	6
Casey Scheidegger	2	0	0	1	0	0	1	0	1	0	5

2022 Alberta Scotties Tournament of Hearts

Laura Walker
2nd Alberta Provincial Championship title

== Qualification ==
=== Qualifier #1 ===
November 25–28, Fort Saskatchewan Curling Club, Fort Saskatchewan

A Event	To Provincials
Krysta Hilker (Avonair)	12
Janais DeJong (Grande Prairie)	12	Janais DeJong (Grande Prairie)	3
Michelle Hartwell (Sherwood Park)	8	Krysta Hilker (Avonair)	10
Pam Appelman (Avonair)	6
Pam Appelman (Avonair)	9
Serena Gray-Withers (Saville)	3
Krysta Hilker (Avonair)	5
Adele Kezama (St. Albert)	6
Marla Sherrer (Lacombe)	6
Adele Kezama (St. Albert)	7
Adele Kezama (St. Albert)	8
Melissa Pierce (Crestwood)	7
Melissa Pierce (Crestwood)	14
Kellie Stiksma (Sherwood Park)	4

B Event	To Provincials
Michelle Hartwell (Sherwood Park)	8
Marla Sherrer (Lacombe)	7	Michelle Hartwell (Sherwood Park)	10
Kellie Stiksma (Sherwood Park)	8
Michelle Hartwell (Sherwood Park)	9
Pam Appelman (Avonair)	5
Michelle Hartwell (Sherwood Park)	6
Melissa Pierce (Crestwood)	7
Janais DeJong (Grande Prairie)	6
Serena Gray-Withers (Saville)	10
Serena Gray-Withers (Saville)	4
Melissa Pierce (Crestwood)	9
Melissa Pierce (Crestwood)	8
Krysta Hilker (Avonair)	6

=== Qualifier #2 ===
December 2–5, Vulcan Curling Club, Vulcan

A Event	To Provincials
Kayla Skrlik (Calgary)	5
Ryleigh Bakker (Calgary)	4	Jessica Wytrychowski (Airdrie)	4
Jessica Wytrychowski (Airdrie)	7	Kayla Skrlik (Calgary)	3
Elysa Crough (Crestwood)	9
Lindsay Bertsch (Vulcan)	5
Elysa Crough (Crestwood)	9	Elysa Crough (Crestwood)	6
Olivia Jones (Okotoks)	5

B Event				To Provincials
Ryleigh Bakker (Calgary)	8
Lindsay Bertsch (Vulcan)	9	Lindsay Bertsch (Vulcan)	10
Olivia Jones (Okotoks)	2	Jessica Wytrychowski (Airdrie)	8
Jessica Wytrychowski (Airdrie)	8			Lindsay Bertsch (Vulcan)	4
				Kayla Skrlik (Calgary)	8
