= 2019 Alberta Scotties Tournament of Hearts =

2019 Jiffy Lube Alberta Scotties Tournament of Hearts
- Host city: Stettler, Alberta
- Arena: Stettler Recreaction Centre
- Dates: January 23–27
- Winner: Team Carey
- Curling club: The Glencoe Club
- Skip: Chelsea Carey
- Third: Sarah Wilkes
- Second: Dana Ferguson
- Lead: Rachelle Brown
- Coach: Dan Carey
- Finalist: Kelsey Rocque

The 2019 Jiffy Lube Alberta Scotties Tournament of Hearts, the provincial women's curling championship for Alberta, was held January 23–27 at the Stettler Recreaction Centre in Stettler, Alberta. The winning Chelsea Carey team went on to win the 2019 Scotties Tournament of Hearts in Sydney, Nova Scotia.

== Qualification ==
Qualification	Berths	Qualifying team(s)
Defending champion	1	Casey Scheidegger
CTRS leader	1	Chelsea Carey
Alberta Tour	2	Kelsey Rocque; Laura Walker
Manning Qualifier	1	Janais DeJong
Garrison Qualifier	2	Jodi Marthaller; Kaitlin Stubbs
Ellerslie Qualifier	5	Marla Sherrer; Nicky Kaufman; Lindsay Makichuk; Krysta Hilker; Adele Kezama

== Teams ==
The teams are listed as follows:

Skip	Third	Second	Lead	Alternate	Club
Chelsea Carey	Sarah Wilkes	Dana Ferguson	Rachelle Brown		The Glencoe
Janais DeJong	Delia DeJong	Amy Janko	Morgan Watchorn		Sexsmith
Krysta Hilker	Katie Morrissey	Sydney Steinke	Heather Steele		Sherwood Park
Nicky Kaufman	Pamela Appelman	Kim Curtin	Stephanie Enright		Saville
Adele Kezama	Jessica Monk	Erica Wiese	Ashley Kalk		Sherwood Park
Lindsay Makichuk	Jennifer Van Wieren	Melissa Pierce	Tiffany Steuber	Jen Person	Spruce Grove
Jodi Marthaller	Jody McNabb	Nicole Larson	Valerie Ekelund		Garrison
Kelsey Rocque	Danielle Schmiemann	Rebecca Konschuh	Jesse Iles	Alison Thiessen	Saville
Casey Scheidegger	Cary-Anne McTaggart	Jessie Haughian	Kristie Moore		Lethbridge
Marla Sherrer	Adrienne Winfield	Julie Selvais	Rebecca Boorse		Lacombe
Kaitlin Stubbs	Lesley Pyne	Megan Johnson	Sarah More	Jody Sutherland	Calgary
Laura Walker	Cathy Overton-Clapham	Lori Olson-Johns	Laine Peters		The Glencoe

== Knockout brackets ==
=== A Event ===
First knockout
Lindsay Makichuk	5
Marla Sherrer	8
Jodi Marthaller	8
Adele Kezama	2
Nicky Kaufman	6
Kaitlin Stubbs	9
Janais DeJong	6
Krysta Hilker	5

Quarterfinals
Casey Scheidegger	8
Marla Sherrer	1
Kelsey Rocque	6
Jodi Marthaller	9
Laura Walker	8
Kaitlin Stubbs	2
Chelsea Carey	7
Janais DeJong	1

Semifinals
Casey Scheidegger	8
Jodi Marthaller	7
Laura Walker	6
Chelsea Carey	8

A Qualifier
Casey Scheidegger	2
Chelsea Carey	7

=== B Event ===
Second knockout
Kelsey Rocque	11
Lindsay Makichuk	1
Kaitlin Stubbs	4
Krysta Hilker	9
Janais DeJong	6
Nicky Kaufman	9
Adele Kezama	7
Marla Sherrer	5

Quarterfinals
Kelsey Rocque	8
Laura Walker	7
Krysta Hilker	13
Jodi Marthaller	6
Nicky Kaufman	7
Adele Kezama	5

Semifinals
Kelsey Rocque	4
Krysta Hilker	2
Nicky Kaufman	5
Casey Scheidegger	6

B Qualifier
Kelsey Rocque	9
Casey Scheidegger	6

=== C Event ===
Third knockout
Lindsay Makichuk	5
Kaitlin Stubbs	4

Semifinals
Lindsay Makichuk	4
Nicky Kaufman	10
Adele Kezama	11
Krysta Hilker	9

C Qualifier 1
Nicky Kaufman	3
Adele Kezama	7

Third knockout		Semifinals		C Qualifier 2
Laura Walker	8
Janais DeJong	5	Laura Walker	2
Jodi Marthaller	7	Jodi Marthaller	9
Marla Sherrer	6			Jodi Marthaller	7
				Casey Scheidegger	6

== Playoffs ==
Page playoff system
A	Chelsea Carey	10
B	Kelsey Rocque	2
C1	Adele Kezama	4
C2	Jodi Marthaller	8

Semifinal
B	Kelsey Rocque	12
C2	Jodi Marthaller	6

Final
A	Chelsea Carey	8
B	Kelsey Rocque	3

=== A vs B ===
Saturday, January 26, 18:30

Sheet C	1	2	3	4	5	6	7	8	9	10	Final
Chelsea Carey 🔨	0	2	2	0	0	3	0	3	X	X	10
Kelsey Rocque	0	0	0	2	0	0	0	0	X	X	2

=== C1 vs C2 ===
Saturday, January 26, 18:30

Sheet A	1	2	3	4	5	6	7	8	9	10	Final
Adele Kezama 🔨	0	0	1	0	1	0	1	0	1	0	4
Jodi Marthaller	0	0	0	1	0	2	0	2	0	3	8

=== Semifinal ===
Sunday, January 27, 11:00

Sheet B	1	2	3	4	5	6	7	8	9	10	Final
Kelsey Rocque 🔨	3	3	0	3	0	2	0	1	X	X	12
Jodi Marthaller	0	0	2	0	2	0	2	0	X	X	6

Player percentages
Kelsey Rocque		Jodi Marthaller	
Jesse Iles	72%	Valerie Ekelund	90%
Rebecca Konschuh	78%	Nicole Larson	75%
Danielle Schmiemann	79%	Jody McNabb	79%
Kelsey Rocque	76%	Jodi Marthaller	66%
Total	76%	Total	78%

=== Final ===
Sunday, January 27, 17:00

Sheet B	1	2	3	4	5	6	7	8	9	10	Final
Chelsea Carey 🔨	0	1	1	1	0	0	1	0	4	X	8
Kelsey Rocque	0	0	0	0	2	0	0	1	0	X	3

Player percentages
Chelsea Carey		Kelsey Rocque	
Rachelle Brown	97%	Jesse Iles	90%
Dana Ferguson	85%	Rebecca Konschuh	75%
Sarah Wilkes	70%	Danielle Schmiemann	74%
Chelsea Carey	86%	Kelsey Rocque	70%
Total	84%	Total	77%

2019 Alberta Scotties Tournament of Hearts

Chelsea Carey
2nd Alberta Provincial Championship title
