= 2020 Alberta Scotties Tournament of Hearts =

Women's curling event in Canada

2020 Sentinel Storage Alberta Scotties Tournament of Hearts
- Host city: Okotoks, Alberta
- Arena: The Murray Arena
- Dates: January 22–26
- Winner: Team Walker
- Curling club: Saville Community SC, Edmonton
- Skip: Laura Walker
- Third: Kate Cameron
- Second: Taylor McDonald
- Lead: Nadine Scotland
- Coach: Brian Chick
- Finalist: Kelsey Rocque

The 2020 Sentinel Storage Alberta Scotties Tournament of Hearts, the provincial women's curling championship for Alberta, was held January 22–26 at The Murray Arena in Okotoks, Alberta. The winning Laura Walker rink represented Alberta at the 2020 Scotties Tournament of Hearts in Moose Jaw, Saskatchewan and finished with a 3–4 record.

Laura Walker won her first Alberta Scotties Tournament of Hearts and capped of an undefeated tournament by defeating Kelsey Rocque's rink 7–4 in the final. Rocque made the final in 2019 as well, falling to eventual Canadian champion Chelsea Carey.

== Qualification process ==
Qualification	Berths	Qualifying team(s)
CTRS leader	1	Kelsey Rocque
Alberta Excel leaders	2	Casey Scheidegger; Kayla Skrlik
Calgary Qualifier	2	Laura Walker; Jodi Vaughan
Jasper Qualifier	3	Marla Sherrer; Nicky Kaufman; Krysta Hilker

== Teams ==
The teams are listed as follows:

Skip	Third	Second	Lead	Alternate	Club
Krysta Hilker	Karynn Flory	Sydney Lewko	Heather Steele		St. Albert
Nicky Kaufman	Pamela Appelman	Kimberley Curtin	Stephanie Enright		Lacombe
Kelsey Rocque	Danielle Schmiemann	Becca Hebert	Jesse Marlow	Heather Rogers	Saville
Casey Scheidegger	Cary-Anne McTaggart	Susan O'Connor^{1}	Kristie Moore		Lethbridge
Marla Sherrer	Janais DeJong	Julie Selvais	Brenna Bilassy		Lacombe
Kayla Skrlik	Lindsay Makichuk	Brittany Tran	Hope Sunley		Glencoe
Jodi Vaughan	Jody McNabb	Nicole Larson	Valerie Ekelund		Lethbridge
Laura Walker	Kate Cameron	Taylor McDonald	Nadine Scotland		Saville

Notes

1. Susan O'Connor is sparing for Team Scheidegger's second Jessie Haughian as she is on maternity leave.

== Round-robin standings ==
Final round-robin standings

Key
Teams to Playoffs

Skip	W	L
Laura Walker	7	0
Kelsey Rocque	6	1
Krysta Hilker	4	3
Nicky Kaufman	3	4
Kayla Skrlik	2	5
Jodi Vaughan	2	5
Marla Sherrer	2	5
Casey Scheidegger	2	5

== Round-robin results ==
All draw times are listed in Mountain Time (UTC-07:00).

=== Draw 1 ===
Wednesday, January 22, 11:00 am

Sheet A	1	2	3	4	5	6	7	8	9	10	11	Final
Laura Walker	0	1	0	2	0	2	0	4	1	0	2	12
Nicky Kaufman	1	0	4	0	2	0	1	0	0	2	0	10

Sheet B	1	2	3	4	5	6	7	8	9	10	Final
Jodi Vaughan	0	0	0	0	0	1	0	2	0	X	3
Kayla Skrlik	2	1	1	1	2	0	1	0	1	X	9

Sheet C	1	2	3	4	5	6	7	8	9	10	Final
Krysta Hilker	0	0	1	1	0	4	0	2	4	X	12
Casey Scheidegger	0	2	0	0	1	0	2	0	0	X	5

Sheet D	1	2	3	4	5	6	7	8	9	10	Final
Kelsey Rocque	2	0	1	0	1	0	1	0	2	X	7
Marla Sherrer	0	1	0	1	0	1	0	2	0	X	5

=== Draw 2 ===
Wednesday, January 22, 6:30 pm

Sheet A	1	2	3	4	5	6	7	8	9	10	Final
Jodi Vaughan	1	0	1	1	0	1	0	1	0	X	5
Casey Scheidegger	0	1	0	0	1	0	1	0	1	X	4

Sheet B	1	2	3	4	5	6	7	8	9	10	Final
Laura Walker	1	0	2	1	0	3	2	X	X	X	9
Marla Sherrer	0	2	0	0	0	0	0	X	X	X	2

Sheet C	1	2	3	4	5	6	7	8	9	10	Final
Kelsey Rocque	1	0	0	1	2	0	0	0	1	X	5
Nicky Kaufman	0	1	0	0	0	0	1	1	0	X	3

Sheet D	1	2	3	4	5	6	7	8	9	10	Final
Krysta Hilker	3	2	0	3	0	1	0	0	1	X	10
Kayla Skrlik	0	0	1	0	1	0	2	2	0	X	6

=== Draw 3 ===
Thursday, January 23, 1:00 pm

Sheet A	1	2	3	4	5	6	7	8	9	10	Final
Kelsey Rocque	0	1	2	0	2	0	2	0	1	X	8
Krysta Hilker	0	0	0	1	0	2	0	1	0	X	4

Sheet B	1	2	3	4	5	6	7	8	9	10	Final
Nicky Kaufman	1	0	1	0	0	1	0	0	1	X	4
Casey Scheidegger	0	2	0	1	1	0	1	1	0	X	6

Sheet C	1	2	3	4	5	6	7	8	9	10	Final
Marla Sherrer	1	0	0	0	0	1	1	0	3	0	6
Kayla Skrlik	0	2	1	0	1	0	0	2	0	1	7

Sheet D	1	2	3	4	5	6	7	8	9	10	Final
Laura Walker	0	1	1	0	0	3	0	2	0	X	7
Jodi Vaughan	0	0	0	1	1	0	1	0	1	X	4

=== Draw 4 ===
Thursday, January 23, 6:30 pm

Sheet A	1	2	3	4	5	6	7	8	9	10	Final
Casey Scheidegger	3	0	0	2	0	3	1	X	X	X	9
Kayla Skrlik	0	1	1	0	0	0	0	X	X	X	2

Sheet B	1	2	3	4	5	6	7	8	9	10	Final
Kelsey Rocque	0	2	0	0	1	0	1	X	X	X	4
Laura Walker	3	0	3	1	0	1	0	X	X	X	8

Sheet C	1	2	3	4	5	6	7	8	9	10	Final
Jodi Vaughan	1	0	0	2	0	0	0	1	1	0	5
Krysta Hilker	0	0	4	0	1	1	0	0	0	1	7

Sheet D	1	2	3	4	5	6	7	8	9	10	Final
Marla Sherrer	1	3	0	0	1	0	0	1	1	1	8
Nicky Kaufman	0	0	1	3	0	1	1	0	0	0	6

=== Draw 5 ===
Friday, January 24, 1:00 pm

Sheet A	1	2	3	4	5	6	7	8	9	10	Final
Krysta Hilker	0	0	1	0	1	1	0	X	X	X	3
Laura Walker	1	0	0	3	0	0	5	X	X	X	9

Sheet B	1	2	3	4	5	6	7	8	9	10	Final
Kayla Skrlik	0	0	2	0	0	1	0	0	1	X	4
Nicky Kaufman	2	1	0	1	1	0	1	1	0	X	7

Sheet C	1	2	3	4	5	6	7	8	9	10	Final
Casey Scheidegger	2	0	0	2	0	0	1	1	0	0	6
Marla Sherrer	0	2	0	0	1	1	0	0	2	1	7

Sheet D	1	2	3	4	5	6	7	8	9	10	Final
Jodi Vaughan	0	0	0	1	0	1	0	X	X	X	2
Kelsey Rocque	0	2	3	0	2	0	2	X	X	X	9

=== Draw 6 ===
Friday, January 24, 6:30 pm

Sheet A	1	2	3	4	5	6	7	8	9	10	Final
Kayla Skrlik	1	0	1	0	1	0	1	0	1	0	5
Kelsey Rocque	0	1	0	1	0	1	0	1	0	2	6

Sheet B	1	2	3	4	5	6	7	8	9	10	Final
Marla Sherrer	2	0	0	0	2	0	0	0	0	1	5
Krysta Hilker	0	0	1	1	0	1	2	1	1	0	7

Sheet C	1	2	3	4	5	6	7	8	9	10	Final
Nicky Kaufman	0	2	2	4	0	0	0	0	3	X	11
Jodi Vaughan	1	0	0	0	1	1	1	1	0	X	5

Sheet D	1	2	3	4	5	6	7	8	9	10	Final
Casey Scheidegger	0	1	0	1	0	0	2	1	0	0	5
Laura Walker	2	0	2	0	3	0	0	0	0	2	9

=== Draw 7 ===
Saturday, January 25, 8:30 am

Sheet A	1	2	3	4	5	6	7	8	9	10	Final
Marla Sherrer	0	1	0	1	0	0	X	X	X	X	2
Jodi Vaughan	1	0	4	0	2	5	X	X	X	X	12

Sheet B	1	2	3	4	5	6	7	8	9	10	Final
Casey Scheidegger	1	0	1	0	2	0	1	0	1	0	6
Kelsey Rocque	0	4	0	0	0	1	0	2	0	1	8

Sheet C	1	2	3	4	5	6	7	8	9	10	Final
Kayla Skrlik	0	0	0	2	0	1	2	0	0	1	6
Laura Walker	0	0	2	0	2	0	0	2	1	0	7

Sheet D	1	2	3	4	5	6	7	8	9	10	Final
Nicky Kaufman	2	0	3	1	0	0	0	3	1	X	10
Krysta Hilker	0	4	0	0	1	2	0	0	0	X	7

== Playoffs ==
Page playoff system
1	Laura Walker	7
2	Kelsey Rocque	1
3	Krysta Hilker	11
4	Nicky Kaufman	7

Semifinal
2	Kelsey Rocque	8
3	Krysta Hilker	1

Final
1	Laura Walker	7
2	Kelsey Rocque	4

=== 1 vs. 2 ===
Saturday, January 25, 6:30 pm

Sheet C	1	2	3	4	5	6	7	8	9	10	Final
Laura Walker	0	0	2	2	2	0	0	1	X	X	7
Kelsey Rocque	0	0	0	0	0	1	0	0	X	X	1

=== 3 vs. 4 ===
Saturday, January 25, 2:00 pm

Sheet A	1	2	3	4	5	6	7	8	9	10	11	Final
Krysta Hilker	1	0	1	1	0	2	0	1	1	0	4	11
Nicky Kaufman	0	2	0	0	2	0	2	0	0	1	0	7

=== Semifinal ===
Sunday, January 26, 10:00 am

Sheet B	1	2	3	4	5	6	7	8	9	10	Final
Kelsey Rocque	0	0	0	3	1	1	0	0	3	X	8
Krysta Hilker	0	0	0	0	0	0	1	0	0	X	1

=== Final ===
Sunday, January 26, 5:00 pm

Sheet B	1	2	3	4	5	6	7	8	9	10	Final
Laura Walker	1	0	1	2	1	0	1	0	1	X	7
Kelsey Rocque	0	1	0	0	0	1	0	2	0	X	4

2020 Alberta Scotties Tournament of Hearts

Laura Walker
1st Alberta Provincial Championship title

== Qualification ==
=== Qualifier #1 ===
December 20–22, Calgary Curling Club, Calgary

A Event
Morgan Muise (Calgary)	6
Subasthika Thangadurai (Calgary)	9

Quarterfinals
Kaitlin Stubbs (Calgary)	9
Subasthika Thangadurai (Calgary)	6
Ryleigh Bakker (Glencoe)	4
Jessica Wytrychowski (Airdrie)	2
Jodi Vaughan (Garrison)	6
Sheena Engel (Okotoks)	8
Laura Walker (Saville)	7
Hollie Vincent (Red Deer)	3

Semifinals
Kaitlin Stubbs (Calgary)	5
Ryleigh Bakker (Glencoe)	9
Sheena Engel (Okotoks)	1
Laura Walker (Saville)	7

To Provincials
Ryleigh Bakker (Glencoe)	2
Laura Walker (Saville)	10

B Event
Morgan Muise (Calgary)	5
Jodi Vaughan (Garrison)	8

Round of 16
Jodi Vaughan (Garrison)	10
Hollie Vincent (Red Deer)	5
Subasthika Thangadurai (Calgary)	6
Jessica Wytrychowski (Airdrie)	11

Quarterfinals
Jodi Vaughan (Garrison)	11
Kaitlin Stubbs (Calgary)	3
Jessica Wytrychowski (Airdrie)	10
Sheena Engel (Okotoks)	4

Semifinals
Jodi Vaughan (Garrison)	11
Jessica Wytrychowski (Airdrie)	5

To Provincials
Jodi Vaughan (Garrison)	7
Ryleigh Bakker (Glencoe)	4

=== Qualifier #2 ===
January 10–12, Jasper Place Curling Club, Edmonton

A Event
Adele Kezama (Avonair)	11
Krysta Hilker (St. Albert)	5
Nicky Kaufman (Shamrock)	8
Holly Scott (Avonair)	5
Ashley Kalk (Sherwood Park)	5
Emily Clark (Westlock)	6

Quarterfinals
Marla Sherrer (Lacombe)	9
Adele Kezama (Avonair)	3
Kellie Stiksma (Crestwood)	7
Melissa Pierce (Crestwood)	1
Selena Sturmay (Saville)	0
Nicky Kaufman (Shamrock)	8
Teryn Berlando (Okotoks)	9
Emily Clark (Westlock)	7

Semifinals
Marla Sherrer (Lacombe)	9
Kellie Stiksma (Crestwood)	4
Nicky Kaufman (Shamrock)	7
Teryn Berlando (Okotoks)	5

To Provincials
Marla Sherrer (Lacombe)	9
Nicky Kaufman (Shamrock)	5

B Event
Holly Scott (Avonair)	8
Adele Kezama (Avonair)	1
Ashley Kalk (Sherwood Park)	5
Selena Sturmay (Saville)	8
Krysta Hilker (St. Albert)	10
Melissa Pierce (Crestwood)	3

Quarterfinals
Holly Scott (Avonair)	10
Emily Clark (Westlock)	5
Selena Sturmay (Saville)	8
Kellie Stiksma (Crestwood)	0
Krysta Hilker (St. Albert)	9
Teryn Berlando (Okotoks)	3

Semifinals
Nicky Kaufman (Shamrock)	11
Holly Scott (Avonair)	2
Selena Sturmay (Saville)	5
Krysta Hilker (St. Albert)	9

To Provincials
Nicky Kaufman (Shamrock)	8
Krysta Hilker (St. Albert)	5

C Event
Adele Kezama (Avonair)	6
Kellie Stiksma (Crestwood)	7
Ashley Kalk (Sherwood Park)	4
Melissa Pierce (Crestwood)	7

Quarterfinals
Kellie Stiksma (Crestwood)	2
Teryn Berlando (Okotoks)	7
Melissa Pierce (Crestwood)	4
Holly Scott (Avonair)	7
Emily Clark (Westlock)	10
Selena Sturmay (Saville)	5

Semifinals
Teryn Berlando (Okotoks)	6
Krysta Hilker (St. Albert)	7
Holly Scott (Avonair)	4
Emily Clark (Westlock)	6

To Provincials
Krysta Hilker (St. Albert)	7
Emily Clark (Westlock)	1
