= Crestwood Ladies Fall Classic =

World Curling Tour event

- Established: 2014
- Host city: Edmonton, Alberta
- Arena: Crestwood Curling Club
- Purse: $7,000
- 2018 champion: (Saskatchewan) Kourtney Fesser

The Crestwood Ladies Fall Classic was an annual bonspiel, or curling tournament, that took place at the Crestwood Curling Club in Edmonton, Alberta. It was established in 2014 and ran until 2018, when it was discontinued. The event was held in a round robin format.

Through its five editions, the event featured mainly Albertan teams, however, only two of the winning teams were from there. The tournament also included teams from other Canadian provinces such as British Columbia, Manitoba, New Brunswick, Saskatchewan, and the Northwest Territories. International teams from China, Japan, Russia, South Korea, Switzerland, and the United States all competed in the event as well, with Gim Un-chi of South Korea and Victoria Moiseeva of Russia winning in 2014 and 2017 respectively.

== Past champions ==
Year	Winning team	Runner-up team	Purse (CDN)
2014	(South Korea) Gim Un-chi, Lee Seul-bee, Um Min-ji, Yeom Yoon-jung	(Alberta) Nicky Kaufman, Holly Whyte, Deena Benoit, Pam Appelman	$11,000
2015	(Alberta) Kristen Streifel, Danielle Schmiemann, Kate Goodhelpsen, Jesse Iles	(Alberta) Nicky Kaufman, Holly Baird, Deena Benoit, Pam Appelman	$11,000
2016	(Alberta) Nadine Chyz, Heather Jensen, Becca Konschuh, Heather Rogers	(Alberta) Kalynn Virtue, Shana Snell, Amanda Craigie, Kaitlin Stubbs	$11,000
2017	(Russia) Victoria Moiseeva, Yulia Portunova, Galina Arsenkina, Julia Guzieva, Uliana Vasilyeva	(Manitoba) Michelle Englot, Kate Cameron, Leslie Wilson-Westcott, Raunora Westcott	$11,000
2018	(Saskatchewan) Kourtney Fesser, Natalie Yanko, Krista Fesser, Karlee Korchinski	(Alberta) Krysta Hilker, Katie Morrissey, Sydney Lewko, Heather Steele	$7,000
