= Danielle Schmiemann =

Canadian curler (born 1996)

- Curler
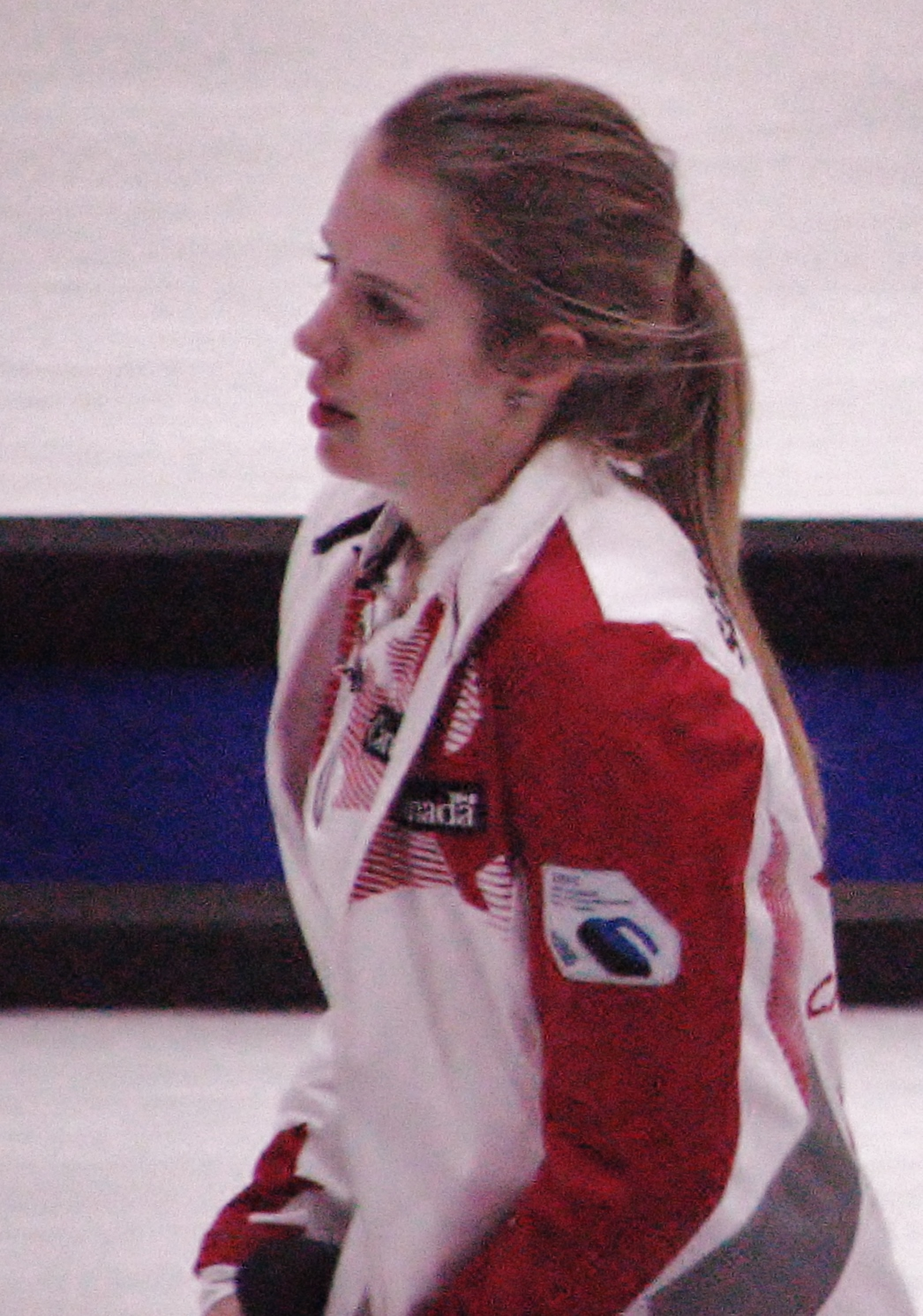
- Schmiemann at the 2015 World Junior Curling Championships
- Born: Danielle Schmiemann; May 29, 1996 (age 30); Olds, Alberta

Team
- Curling club: Saville Community Sports Centre, Edmonton, AB
- Skip: Selena Sturmay
- Third: Danielle Schmiemann
- Second: Dezaray Hawes
- Lead: Paige Papley
- Alternate: Brianna Cullen
- Mixed doubles partner: Jason Ginter

Curling career
- Member Association: Alberta
- Hearts: 3 (2024, 2025, 2026)
- Top CTRS ranking: 5th (2023–24)
Medal record
Women's curling
Representing Canada
World Junior Curling Championships
Gold medal – first place	2015 Tallinn
Winter Universiade
Gold medal – first place	2017 Almaty
Representing Alberta
Scotties Tournament of Hearts
Bronze medal – third place	2026 Mississauga
Canadian Mixed Doubles Curling Championship
Bronze medal – third place	2021 Calgary

Danielle Nicole Schmiemann (born May 29, 1996) is a Canadian curler from Edmonton, Alberta. She currently plays third on Team Selena Sturmay. She is originally from Sundre, Alberta but later moved to and graduated from high school in Stony Plain, Alberta.

== Career ==
=== Juniors ===
Schmiemann started at the University of Alberta in 2014, joining the Pandas Curling Program. She played within the program throughout the entirety of her University Degree and now joins a group of Bears and Pandas alumni, including all three of her current teammates Kelsey Rocque, Dana Ferguson and Rachelle Brown.

In 2015, Schmiemann joined the Kelsey Rocque rink of Rocque, Holly Jamieson and Jesse Iles. The team won the Alberta Junior Curling Championship, earning her and her team a berth at the 2015 Canadian Junior Curling Championships in Corner Brook, Newfoundland and Labrador. There, the team went 9–1 in the round robin giving them a birth to the final, where they won against Ontario's Chelsea Brandwood 8–2. The team represented Canada at the 2015 World Junior Curling Championships, where they would go undefeated en route to claiming the title. Rocque aged out of juniors following the season and Schmiemann joined the Kristen Streifel rink at third. The team won one tour event, the Crestwood Ladies Fall Classic. At the Alberta Junior Provincials, the team lost the semifinal and would not go to the 2016 Canadian Junior Curling Championships. Later that season, Schmiemann played with Rocque and represented the Alberta Pandas at the 2016 CIS/CCA Curling Championships where they defeated the Thompson Rivers WolfPack skipped by Corryn Brown in the final.

=== Women's ===
Schmiemann chose not to play in her final year of juniors as the 2017 Alberta Junior Provincials and Canadian Junior Curling Championships conflicted with the 2017 Winter Universiade. Because of this, she began skipping her own team for the 2016–17 season. The team failed to qualify for the playoffs in any tour events. With their win at the 2016 CIS/CCA Curling Championships earlier the previous year, Schmiemann would play with Rocque at the 2017 Winter Universiade where they would once again find success winning the gold medal for Canada. She played in the U Sports/Curling Canada University Curling Championships again in 2018 representing the University of Alberta where they won the title once again alongside teammates Kristen Streifel, Selena Sturmay, Jesse Iles and Paige Papley. This would set them up to represent Canada once again at the 2019 Winter Universiade in Krasnoyarsk, Russia. Shortly after this win, Schmiemann would join Rocque as an official team in 2018, with Becca Konschuh at second and Jesse Iles at lead. They made the quarterfinals at the Tour Challenge Tier 2 Grand Slam of Curling event and finished runner-up at the 2019 Alberta Scotties Tournament of Hearts to Chelsea Carey. She then played with Streifel at the 2019 Winter Universiade where they lost to Sophie Jackson from Great Britain in the qualification game. Schmiemann was also chosen to be the flag bearer for the entirety of Team Canada at this Universiade.

Team Rocque had a strong 2019–20 season, starting it off with a semifinal finish at the 2019 Cameron's Brewing Oakville Fall Classic. The team qualified for the playoffs at the 2019 Tour Challenge Grand Slam event where they lost to eventual winners Anna Hasselborg. Going into the 2020 Alberta Scotties Tournament of Hearts, Rocque was the number one seeded team, earning their spot through the CTRS points leader berth. They went 6–1 through the round robin, with their only loss to the Laura Walker. They would play Walker again in the 1 vs. 2 game where they lost 7–1. They won the semifinal against Krysta Hilker 8–1 setting up the third match for Rocque and Walker during the competition. The team struggled during the final, not able to figure out the ice and losing the final for the second consecutive year. It would be the team's last event of the season as both the Players' Championship and the Champions Cup Grand Slam events were cancelled due to the COVID-19 pandemic. On March 18, 2020, it was announced that both Becca Hebert and Jesse Marlow would be leaving the team. Rocque and Schmiemann then announced on March 21 that Dana Ferguson and Rachelle Brown would be joining them for the 2020–21 season.

Due to the pandemic, most of the tour events during the 2020–21 season were cancelled. Team Rocque played only one competitive game together during the entire season at the Okotoks Ladies Classic in November. After the first draw, the event was cancelled due to a province-wide shutdown in Alberta. Due to the COVID-19 pandemic in Alberta, the 2021 provincial championship was also cancelled. As the reigning provincials champions, Team Laura Walker were chosen to represent Alberta at the 2021 Scotties Tournament of Hearts. However, due to many provinces cancelling their provincial championships as a result of the COVID-19 pandemic in Canada, Curling Canada added three Wild Card teams to the national championship, which were based on the CTRS standings from the 2019–20 season. Team Rocque was one of the top three non-qualified teams, but they did not retain at least three of their four players from the previous season, meaning they could not qualify for the national championship.

In their first event of the 2021–22 season, Team Rocque reached the quarterfinals of the 2021 Alberta Curling Series: Saville Shoot-Out. Due to the pandemic, the qualification process for the 2021 Canadian Olympic Curling Trials had to be modified to qualify enough teams for the championship. In these modifications, Curling Canada created the 2021 Canadian Curling Trials Direct-Entry Event, an event where five teams would compete to try to earn one of three spots into the 2021 Canadian Olympic Curling Trials. Team Rocque qualified for the Trials Direct-Entry Event due to their CTRS ranking from the 2019–20 season. At the event, the team went 3–1 through the round robin, enough to secure their spot at the Olympic Trials. Next, Team Rocque played in both the 2021 Masters and the 2021 National Grand Slam events. After failing to reach the playoffs at the Masters, the team made it all the way to the semifinals of the National where they were defeated by Tracy Fleury. It was the furthest the team had ever advanced in a Grand Slam event. A few weeks later, they competed in the Olympic Trials, held November 20 to 28 in Saskatoon, Saskatchewan. At the event, the team began by losing five of their first six games. They then won their final two games, which included a victory over Kerri Einarson, to finish in seventh place with a 3–5 record. In their final game against Einarson, the team shot a high 95% which included a 99% game by Schmiemann. Team Rocque then competed in the 2022 Alberta Scotties Tournament of Hearts, where they posted a 6–1 record through the round robin. This created a three-way tie between Rocque, Laura Walker and the Casey Scheidegger rink, however, as Walker had to best draw shot challenge between the three rinks, they advanced directly to the final. In the semifinal, Team Rocque fell 10–7 to Team Scheidegger, eliminating them from contention. On March 21, 2022, the team announced that they would be staying together despite the Olympic quadrennial coming to an end.

Team Rocque began the 2022–23 season at the 2022 Saville Shoot-Out where they missed the playoffs with a 3–2 record. The team next played in the 2022 PointsBet Invitational. They defeated Christina Black in the first round before losing to Kerri Einarson in the quarterfinals. Team Rocque were invited to compete in the 2022 Tour Challenge Tier 2 event where they qualified for the playoffs with a 3–1 record. They then lost to Clancy Grandy 7–4 in the quarterfinals. After winning the last chance qualifier in Rimbey, the team qualified for the 2023 Alberta Scotties Tournament of Hearts. There, Team Rocque had mixed results, ultimately missing the playoffs with a 4–3 record. The team announced on February 6, 2023, that they would be parting ways. It was later announced that she would play third on the Selena Sturmay rink with second Dezaray Hawes and lead Paige Papley for the 2023–24 season.

The new Sturmay team had mixed results to begin the season, qualifying for the playoffs in three of their first five events but never advancing past the quarterfinals. The team turned things around in October, however, beginning at the Saville Grand Prix where after an opening draw loss, they ran the table to claim the title. They next competed at the Red Deer Curling Classic where they advanced all the way to the final before losing to the Rachel Homan rink. In their next two events, they reached the semifinals of the DeKalb Superspiel and the final of the MCT Championships, losing out to Xenia Schwaller and Beth Peterson respectively. In the new year, the team got a last-minute call to play in the 2024 Canadian Open after Stefania Constantini dropped out due to illness. There, they finished with a 1–3 record, defeating Jolene Campbell in their sole victory. Next was the 2024 Alberta Scotties Tournament of Hearts where Team Sturmay finished first through the round robin with a 6–1 record, earning them a bye to the final. There, they faced defending champions Team Skrlik. Down one without the hammer in the tenth, the team stole two after Kayla Skrlik's final draw went through the rings. This qualified the team for the 2024 Scotties Tournament of Hearts, Schmiemann's first appearance at the national women's championship. The Alberta squad went through the round robin, finishing first through their pool with a 7–1 record. This included wins over Scotties veterans Kerri Einarson, Kaitlyn Lawes and Krista McCarville. After losing to Jennifer Jones in the first round of the championship, they again beat Lawes to advance to the playoffs. There, they fell 6–4 to Manitoba's Kate Cameron in the 3 vs. 4 game, finishing fourth. The following season, in a change to the qualification process, three teams in the field at the Scotties Tournament of Hearts pre-qualified for the 2025 Scotties based on their 2023–24 Canadian Team Ranking Standings, and Curling Canada announced Sturmay would be one of these teams, which meant they bypassed and did not have to play in the 2025 Alberta provincial championship. At the 2025 Scotties, Team Sturmay would finish 4–4 after round robin play, failing to qualify for the playoffs.

Team Sturmay's success over the 2023–25 seasons and Canadian Team Ranking Standings qualified Sturmay for the 2025 Canadian Olympic Curling Pre-Trials. At the 2025 Pre-Trials, the Sturmay rink would win the event, finishing first in the round robin with a 5–2 record and then beating Kayla MacMillan 2 games to 1 in the best-of-three final. This would qualify the rink for the 2025 Canadian Olympic Curling Trials, with a shot to represent Canada at the 2026 Winter Olympics. There, Sturmay would finish with a 4–3 record, finishing 4th and just missing out on the playoffs. Team Sturmay would continue their success, winning the 2026 Alberta Women's Curling Championship, beating Serena Gray-Withers 9–5 in the final, qualifying Sturmay to represent Alberta at the 2026 Scotties Tournament of Hearts. At the 2026 Scotties, Sturmay would improve on their previous performances, going 6–2 in the round-robin, and qualify for the playoffs. After beating Nova Scotia's Christina Black in the 3v4 game, Sturmay would then lose to Kerri Einarson 12–5 in the semifinal, winning the bronze medal.

=== Mixed doubles ===
Schmiemann also competes in the Mixed Doubles discipline with her partner, Jason Ginter. Together they won the 2017 Alberta Mixed Doubles Provincial Championship and would go onto to lose a tie-breaker at the 2017 Canadian Mixed Doubles Curling Championship. They made their second appearance at the Nationals in 2019 in Fredericton, New Brunswick where they finished with a record of 4-3 but failed to qualify for playoffs. They had qualified for the 2020 Canadian Mixed Doubles Curling Championship to be held in Portage La Prairie before it was cancelled due to the coronavirus pandemic. In 2021, Schmiemann competed in her third mixed doubles national championship when she replaced a pregnant Rachel Homan as John Morris' partner at the 2021 Canadian Mixed Doubles Curling Championship. The pair finished the round robin with a 5–1 record and defeated the number one seeds Laura Walker and Kirk Muyres to qualify for the 1 vs. 2 page playoff game. They then lost both the 1 vs. 2 game and the semifinal to earn the bronze medal.

== Personal life ==
Schmiemann graduated from the University of Alberta in 2018 with a Bachelors of Science in kinesiology, and also attended MacEwan University completing her Acupuncture Diploma. She works as an acupuncturist for Bloom Therapy Wellness Centre. She is married to Jason Ginter.

== Teams ==
Season	Skip	Third	Second	Lead
2012–13	Taylore Maschmeyer	Alison Thiessen	Chelsea Duncan	Danielle Schmiemann
2013–14	Danielle Schmiemann	Kate Goodhelpsen	Brenna Bilassy	Rebecca Boorse
2014–15	Kelsey Rocque	Danielle Schmiemann	Holly Jamieson	Jesse Iles
2015–16	Kristen Streifel	Danielle Schmiemann	Kate Goodhelpsen	Jesse Iles
2016–17	Danielle Schmiemann	Erica Ott	Taylore Maschmeyer	Holly Jamieson
2017–18	Kristen Streifel	Danielle Schmiemann	Taylore Maschmeyer	Jesse Iles
2018–19	Kelsey Rocque	Danielle Schmiemann	Becca Konschuh	Jesse Iles
2019–20	Kelsey Rocque	Danielle Schmiemann	Becca Hebert	Jesse Marlow
2020–21	Kelsey Rocque	Danielle Schmiemann	Dana Ferguson	Rachelle Brown
2021–22	Kelsey Rocque	Danielle Schmiemann	Dana Ferguson	Rachelle Brown
2022–23	Kelsey Rocque	Danielle Schmiemann	Dana Ferguson	Rachelle Brown
2023–24	Selena Sturmay	Danielle Schmiemann	Dezaray Hawes	Paige Papley
2024–25	Selena Sturmay	Danielle Schmiemann	Dezaray Hawes	Paige Papley
2025–26	Selena Sturmay	Danielle Schmiemann	Dezaray Hawes	Paige Papley
2026–27	Selena Sturmay	Danielle Schmiemann	Dezaray Hawes	Paige Papley
