= Nadine Scotland =

Canadian curler

- Curler
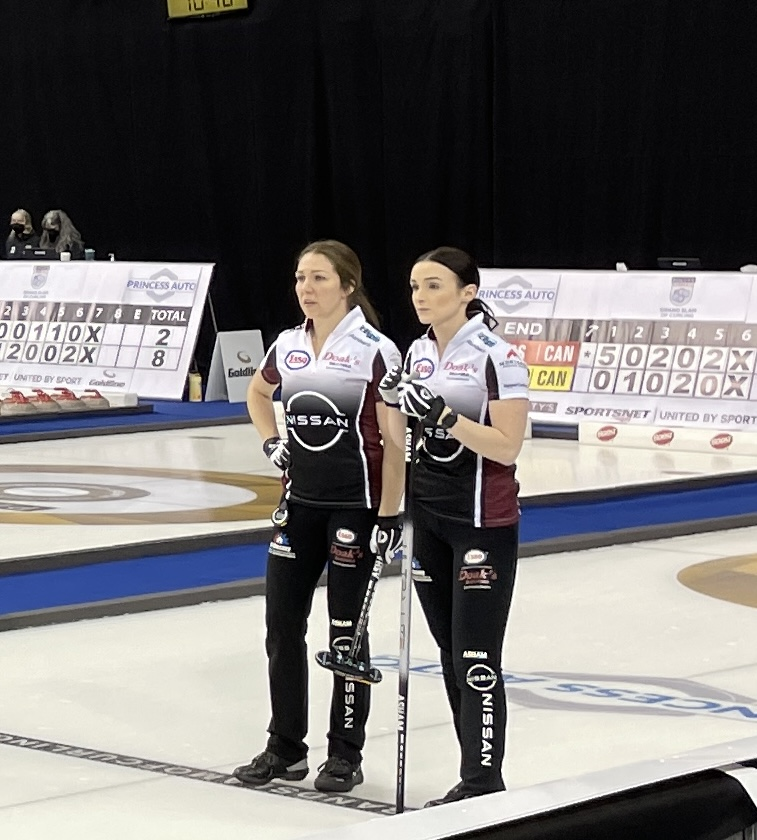
- Scotland (left) and Taylor McDonald at the 2022 Players' Championship
- Born: Nadine Chyz; October 4, 1990 (age 36); Calgary, Alberta

Team
- Curling club: Calgary CC, Calgary, AB

Curling career
- Member Association: Alberta
- Hearts: 2 (2020, 2022)
- Top CTRS ranking: 5th (2021–22)

Nadine Scotland (born October 4, 1990 as Nadine Chyz) is a Canadian curler from Calgary, Alberta.

== Career ==
Scotland's first breakout event was at the 2011 Canadian Junior Curling Championships, where she represented Team Alberta. She skipped the team to an 11–1 round robin record before losing the final to Saskatchewan's Trish Paulsen. She also skipped the team in 2010 at the 2010 Canadian Junior Curling Championships where they lost in the tiebreaker. When she was just 16, she skipped Alberta to a 3–3 record at the 2007 Canada Winter Games. She was the alternate for the Canadian team skipped by Jocelyn Peterman at the 2012 World Junior Curling Championships where they also lost in the tiebreaker.

Scotland won her first World Curling Tour event in 2013 at the Spruce Grove Cashspiel as third for Amy Nixon.

The 2016–17 season was a breakout season for Scotland and her team of Heather Jensen, Becca Konschuh and Heather Rogers. They won four tour events: the Avonair Cash Spiel, the Crestwood Ladies Fall Classic, the Red Deer Curling Classic and the Curl Mesabi Classic and lost the final of the Medicine Hat Charity Classic. At the 2017 Alberta Scotties Tournament of Hearts, the team lost the C Event semifinal and were eliminated.

The team defended their title at the Avonair Cash Spiel the following season, going undefeated throughout the tournament. They once again lost in the C semifinal at the 2018 Alberta Scotties Tournament of Hearts, this year to Laura Walker. Team Scotland also got to compete at the 2017 Canadian Olympic Curling Pre-Trials where they lost in the quarterfinal to Julie Tippin.

Scotland joined the Walker team for the 2019–20 season. The team consisted of Walker at skip, Kate Cameron at third, Taylor McDonald at second and Scotland playing lead. They won two tour events, the Mother Club Fall Curling Classic and the DEKALB Superspiel. They also lost the final of the Curl Mesabi Classic and had quarterfinal finishes at the Canad Inns Women's Classic and the Boundary Ford Curling Classic. They competed in two Grand Slam of Curling events where they missed the playoffs at both the Tour Challenge Tier 2 and the Canadian Open. Scotland won her first provincial title at the 2020 Alberta Scotties Tournament of Hearts where team Walker went undefeated through the event to win the provincial crest. Team Walker represented Alberta at the 2020 Scotties Tournament of Hearts where they finished with a 3–4 record, missing the playoffs. It would be the team's last event of the season as both the Players' Championship and the Champions Cup Grand Slam events were cancelled due to the COVID-19 pandemic.

Due to the pandemic, the 2021 Alberta Scotties were cancelled, so Curling Alberta appointed the Walker rink to represent the province at the 2021 Scotties Tournament of Hearts. Scotland would however not compete at the Hearts, as she was three-months pregnant. She was replaced by Rachel Brown. At the Scotties, the team finished with a 9–3 round robin record, tied for third with Manitoba, skipped by Jennifer Jones. They would defeat Manitoba in the tiebreaker before losing to Team Canada's Kerri Einarson in the semifinal.

In just their second event of the 2021–22 season, Team Walker reached the final of the 2021 Alberta Curling Series: Saville Shoot-Out where they were defeated by Kim Eun-jung. Due to the pandemic, the qualification process for the 2021 Canadian Olympic Curling Trials had to be modified to qualify enough teams for the championship. In these modifications, Curling Canada created the 2021 Canadian Curling Trials Direct-Entry Event, an event where five teams would compete to try to earn one of three spots into the 2021 Canadian Olympic Curling Trials. Team Walker qualified for the Trials Direct-Entry Event due to their CTRS ranking from the 2019–20 season. At the event, the team went 2–2 through the round robin, qualifying for the tiebreaker round where they faced British Columbia's Corryn Brown. After being defeated by Brown in the first game, Team Walker won the second tiebreaker to secure their spot at the Olympic Trials. The team had one more event before the Trials, the 2021 National Grand Slam, where they lost in the quarterfinals to Tracy Fleury. A few weeks later, they competed in the Olympic Trials, held November 20 to 28 in Saskatoon, Saskatchewan. At the event, the team had mixed results, ultimately finishing in sixth place with a 3–5 record.

A few weeks before the Alberta provincial championship, Team Walker won the Alberta Curling Series: Avonair tour event, defeating Casey Scheidegger in the final. They then competed in the 2022 Alberta Scotties Tournament of Hearts, where they posted a 6–1 record through the round robin. This created a three-way tie between Walker, Scheidegger and the Kelsey Rocque rink, however, as Walker had to best draw shot challenge between the three rinks, they advanced directly to the final. There, they met the Scheidegger rink, who defeated Rocque in the semifinal. After a tight final, Walker secured the victory for her team with a draw to the eight-foot to win 6–5. This qualified the team for their second straight national championship. At the 2022 Scotties Tournament of Hearts, the team could not replicate their success from 2021, finishing the round robin with a 3–5 record and missing the playoffs. Team Walker wrapped up their season at the 2022 Players' Championship where they missed the playoffs.

On March 17, 2022, the team announced that they would be disbanding at the end of the 2021–22 season.

== Personal life ==
Scotland works as a Communications and special events manager for the Special Olympics Calgary. She is married to Ian Scotland, and has one child.

== Teams ==
Season	Skip	Third	Second	Lead
2008–09	Nadine Chyz	Rebecca Pattison	Kristina Hadden	Kimberly Anderson
2009–10	Nadine Chyz	Rebecca Pattison	Kristina Hadden	Kimberly Anderson
2010–11	Nadine Chyz	Rebecca Pattison	Jessie Scheidegger	Kimberly Anderson
2011–12	Nadine Chyz	Rebecca Pattison	Whitney Eckstrand	Kimberly Anderson
2012–13	Amy Nixon	Nadine Chyz	Whitney Eckstrand	Tracy Bush
2013–14	Amy Nixon	Nadine Chyz	Whitney Eckstrand	Heather Rogers
2014–15	Nadine Chyz	Heather Jensen	Whitney Eckstrand	Heather Rogers
2015–16	Nadine Chyz	Heather Jensen	Whitney Eckstrand	Heather Rogers
2016–17	Nadine Chyz	Heather Jensen	Becca Konschuh	Heather Rogers
2017–18	Nadine Scotland	Heather Jensen	Becca Konschuh	Heather Rogers
2019–20	Laura Walker	Kate Cameron	Taylor McDonald	Nadine Scotland
2020–21	Laura Walker	Kate Cameron	Taylor McDonald	Nadine Scotland
2021–22	Laura Walker	Kate Cameron	Taylor McDonald	Nadine Scotland
