= 2018 Alberta Scotties Tournament of Hearts =

2018 Jiffy Lube Alberta Scotties Tournament of Hearts
- Host city: Medicine Hat, Alberta
- Arena: Medicine Hat Curling Club
- Dates: January 10–14
- Winner: Team Scheidegger
- Curling club: Grande Prairie CC, Grande Prairie
- Skip: Casey Scheidegger
- Third: Cary-Anne McTaggart
- Second: Jessie Scheidegger
- Lead: Kristie Moore
- Coach: Carolyn McRorie
- Finalist: Shannon Kleibrink

The 2018 Jiffy Lube Alberta Scotties Tournament of Hearts, the provincial women's curling championship for Alberta, was held January 10–14 at the Medicine Hat Curling Club in Medicine Hat, Alberta. The winning Casey Scheidegger rink represented Alberta at the 2018 Scotties Tournament of Hearts.

== Qualification Process ==
| Qualification method | Berths | Qualifying team |
|---|---|---|
| Defending Champion | 1 | Shannon Kleibrink |
| CTRS leaders | 1 | Val Sweeting |
| Alberta Tour | 2 | Chelsea Carey; Jodi Marthaller |
| Northern Region | 3 | Laura Crocker; Jessie Hunkin; Marla Sherrer |
| Southern Region | 3 | Amanda Craigie; Nadine Scotland; Geri-Lynn Ramsay |
| Peace Region | 2 | Casey Scheidegger; Delia DeJong |

== Teams ==
The teams are listed as follows:

| Skip | Third | Second | Lead | Alternate | Club(s) |
|---|---|---|---|---|---|
| Chelsea Carey | Cathy Overton-Clapham | Jocelyn Peterman | Laine Peters | Jessica Amundson | The Glencoe Club, Calgary |
| Amanda Craigie | Kaitlin Stubbs | Cassandra Savage | Lindsay Ross | Morgan Muise | Calgary Curling Club, Calgary |
| Kelsey Rocque | Laura Crocker (skip) | Taylor McDonald | Jen Gates | | Saville Community Sports Centre, Edmonton |
| Delia DeJong | Janais DeJong | Katie Morrissey | Brenna Bilassy | | Sexsmith Curling Club, Sexsmith |
| Jessie Hunkin | Holly Jamieson | Lynelle Mahe | Kim Curtin | | Avonair Curling Club, Edmonton |
| Shannon Kleibrink | Sarah Wilkes | Kalynn Park | Alison Thiessen | | Okotoks Curling Club, Okotoks |
| Jodi Marthaller | Jody McNabb | Nicole Larson | Valerie Ekelund | | Lethbridge Curling Club, Lethbridge |
| Geri-Lynn Ramsay | Kelly Erickson | Brittany Tran | Claire Tully | | The Glencoe Club, Calgary |
| Casey Scheidegger | Cary-Anne McTaggart | Jessie Scheidegger | Kristie Moore | | Grande Prairie Curling Club, Grande Prairie |
| Nadine Scotland | Heather Jensen | Rebecca Konschuh | Heather Rogers | | The Glencoe Club, Calgary |
| Marla Sherrer | Adrienne Winfield | Julie Selvais | Amanda Moizis | Rebecca Allen | Lacombe Curling Club, Lacombe |
| Val Sweeting | Lori Olson-Johns | Dana Ferguson | Rachelle Brown | | Saville Community Sports Centre, Edmonton |

== Knockout brackets ==
=== A Event ===
First Knockout
Jodi Marthaller | 10
Geri-Lynn Ramsay | 6
Shannon Kleibrink | 10
Delia DeJong | 8
Nadine Scotland | 8
Amanda Graigie | 6
Marla Sherrer | 9
Jessie Hunkin | 6

Quarterfinals
Chelsea Carey | 8
Jodi Marthaller | 1
Laura Crocker | 5
Shannon Kleibrink | 7
Casey Scheidegger | 8
Nadine Scotland | 5
Val Sweeting | 8
Marla Sherrer | 1

Semifinals
Chelsea Carey | 7
Shannon Kleibrink | 5
Casey Scheidegger | 6
Val Sweeting | 9

A Qualifier
Chelsea Carey | 7
Val Sweeting | 4

=== B Event ===
Second Knockout
Laura Crocker | 7
Geri-Lynn Ramsay | 5
Nadine Scotland | 9
Jessie Hunkin | 5
Marla Sherrer | 12
Amanda Craigie | 7
Jodi Marthaller | 7
Delia DeJong | 10

Quarterfinals
Laura Crocker | 3
Casey Scheidegger | 7
Nadine Scotland | 8
Shannon Kleibrink | 9
Marla Sherrer | 2
Delia DeJong | 9

Semifinals
Casey Scheidegger | 6
Shannon Kleibrink | 4
Val Sweeting | 7
Delia DeJong | 4

B Qualifier
Casey Scheidegger | 9
Val Sweeting | 8

=== C Event ===
Third Knockout
Geri-Lynn Ramsay | 12
Jessie Hunkin | 8

Semifinals
Geri-Lynn Ramsay | 6
Delia DeJong | 7
Marla Sherrer | 2
Shannon Kleibrink | 6

C Qualifier 1
Delia DeJong | 6
Shannon Kleibrink | 10

| Third Knockout | | Semifinals | | C Qualifier 2 |
| Laura Crocker | 8 |
| Amanda Graigie | 3 | Laura Crocker | 6 |
| Nadine Scotland | 9 | Nadine Scotland | 5 |
| Jodi Marthaller | 7 | | | Laura Crocker | 5 |
| | | | | Val Sweeting | 6 |

== Playoffs ==
Page playoff system
A | Chelsea Carey | 7
B | Casey Scheidegger | 8
C1 | Shannon Kleibrink | 8
C2 | Val Sweeting | 2

Semifinal
A | Chelsea Carey | 6
C1 | Shannon Kleibrink | 7

Final
B | Casey Scheidegger | 7
C1 | Shannon Kleibrink | 6

=== A vs B ===
Saturday, January 13, 6:30pm

| Sheet C | 1 | 2 | 3 | 4 | 5 | 6 | 7 | 8 | 9 | 10 | Final |
|---|---|---|---|---|---|---|---|---|---|---|---|
| Chelsea Carey | 1 | 1 | 1 | 0 | 1 | 0 | 0 | 0 | 3 | 0 | 7 |
| Casey Scheidegger | 0 | 0 | 0 | 1 | 0 | 3 | 2 | 0 | 0 | 2 | 8 |

=== C1 vs C2 ===
Saturday, January 13, 6:30pm

| Sheet A | 1 | 2 | 3 | 4 | 5 | 6 | 7 | 8 | 9 | 10 | Final |
|---|---|---|---|---|---|---|---|---|---|---|---|
| Shannon Kleibrink | 0 | 2 | 0 | 4 | 0 | 0 | 2 | X | X | X | 8 |
| Val Sweeting | 0 | 0 | 1 | 0 | 0 | 1 | 0 | X | X | X | 2 |

=== Semifinal ===
Sunday, January 14, 10:30am

| Sheet C | 1 | 2 | 3 | 4 | 5 | 6 | 7 | 8 | 9 | 10 | Final |
|---|---|---|---|---|---|---|---|---|---|---|---|
| Chelsea Carey | 0 | 2 | 0 | 2 | 0 | 1 | 0 | 1 | 0 | 0 | 6 |
| Shannon Kleibrink | 0 | 0 | 1 | 0 | 1 | 0 | 3 | 0 | 1 | 1 | 7 |

=== Final ===
Sunday, January 14, 4:30 pm

| Sheet C | 1 | 2 | 3 | 4 | 5 | 6 | 7 | 8 | 9 | 10 | 11 | Final |
|---|---|---|---|---|---|---|---|---|---|---|---|---|
| Casey Scheidegger | 1 | 0 | 2 | 1 | 0 | 1 | 0 | 0 | 0 | 1 | 1 | 7 |
| Shannon Kleibrink | 0 | 1 | 0 | 0 | 2 | 0 | 1 | 2 | 0 | 0 | 0 | 6 |

2018 Alberta Scotties Tournament of Hearts

Casey Scheidegger
1st Alberta Provincial Championship title
