= Jessie Haughian =

Canadian curler

- Curler
- Born: Jessie Scheidegger; November 10, 1990 (age 36); Lethbridge, Alberta

Team
- Curling club: Lethbridge CC, Lethbridge, AB
- Skip: Robyn Silvernagle
- Third: Jessie Hunkin
- Second: Jessie Haughian
- Lead: Kristie Moore

Curling career
- Member Association: Alberta
- Hearts: 3 (2018, 2019, 2023)
- Top CTRS ranking: 5th (2016-17, 2018-19)
- Grand Slam victories: 1 (2017 Canadian Open)

Jessie Haughian (born Scheidegger; November 10, 1990) is a Canadian curler from Turin, Alberta. She currently plays second on Team Robyn Silvernagle. She was the longtime second for her sister Casey Scheidegger's team.

== Career ==
=== Juniors ===
Haughian won two Alberta provincial junior titles, in 2009 and 2011. In 2009 she won playing second on her sister Casey's team. The team represented Alberta at the 2009 Canadian Junior Curling Championships. The team finished the round robin with a 9–3 record, but lost in the semifinal to Manitoba, skipped by Kaitlyn Lawes. That same season, the team won one World Curling Tour event, the 2008 Meyers Norris Penny Charity Classic. In 2011, she played second for team Nadine Chyz, and represented Alberta at the 2011 Canadian Junior Curling Championships. There, they finished the round robin in first place with an 11–1 record and lost in the final to Saskatchewan's Trish Paulsen rink.

=== Women's ===
After juniors, Haughian re-joined her sister's team at second. She played in her first Alberta Scotties Tournament of Hearts in 2012, but the team missed the playoffs. She also played in her first Grand Slam event that season, the 2011 Curlers Corner Autumn Gold Curling Classic, again failing to make the playoffs. The next season, the team played in the 2013 Alberta Scotties Tournament of Hearts, but missed the playoffs.

The team played in the 2013 Curlers Corner Autumn Gold Curling Classic, Haughian's second career slam, where they again missed the playoffs. They played in the 2014 Alberta Scotties Tournament of Hearts, missing the playoffs for the third time.

The team fared better in the 2014–15 season. They did not make the playoffs at the 2014 Curlers Corner Autumn Gold Curling Classic, but won one WCT event, the 2014 Medicine Hat Charity Classic. At the 2015 Alberta Scotties Tournament of Hearts the team finally made the playoffs, where they lost in the 3 vs. 4 game to Team Chelsea Carey.

In 2015, the team won the Boundary Ford Curling Classic, their third career tour win. They were less successful at the 2016 Alberta Scotties Tournament of Hearts, missing the playoffs.

The team was more successful during the 2016–17 season. On the tour, they won the 2016 Medicine Hat Charity Classic, the HDF Insurance Shoot-Out, the 2016 Curlers Corner Autumn Gold Curling Classic and the 2017 Meridian Canadian Open, the team's first career Grand Slam win. The team played in two other slams that season, making it to the quarterfinals of the 2017 Players' Championship and missing the playoffs at the 2017 Humpty's Champions Cup. At the 2017 Alberta Scotties Tournament of Hearts, the team made it to the semifinals, where they lost to Team Val Sweeting. Their success over the season qualified the team for the 2017 Canadian Olympic Curling Trials.

In the 2017–18 season, the team missed the playoffs at the 2017 GSOC Tour Challenge, made it to the quarter-finals of the 2017 Masters of Curling and lost in the final of the 2017 Boost National. They failed to make the playoffs at the Olympic Trials. Haughian, with Team Scheidegger, won her first Alberta Scotties in 2018, defeating Shannon Kleibrink in the final. At the 2018 Scotties Tournament of Hearts, the team finished the Championship Pool in fifth place with a 7–4 record, just missing the playoffs.

Team Scheidegger missed the playoffs at the 2019 Alberta Scotties Tournament of Hearts, but they qualified for the 2019 Scotties Tournament of Hearts by defeating Kerri Einarson in the Wild Card game. At the Scotties, they again finished in fifth place with a 7–4 record, missing the playoffs.

In the 2019–20 season, Team Scheidegger, skipped by Cheryl Bernard, missed the playoffs at the 2019 Canada Cup. With Scheidegger skipping, they missed the playoffs at the 2020 Alberta Scotties Tournament of Hearts.

== Personal life ==
Haughian is a case management specialist with the City of Lethbridge. She is married to Sheldon Haughian and has one child. She attended the University of Lethbridge. Her hometown is Diamond City, Alberta. She also plays fast-pitch softball, playing on two provincial championship teams.
