= Laura Walker (curler) =

Canadian curler (born 1990)

- Curler
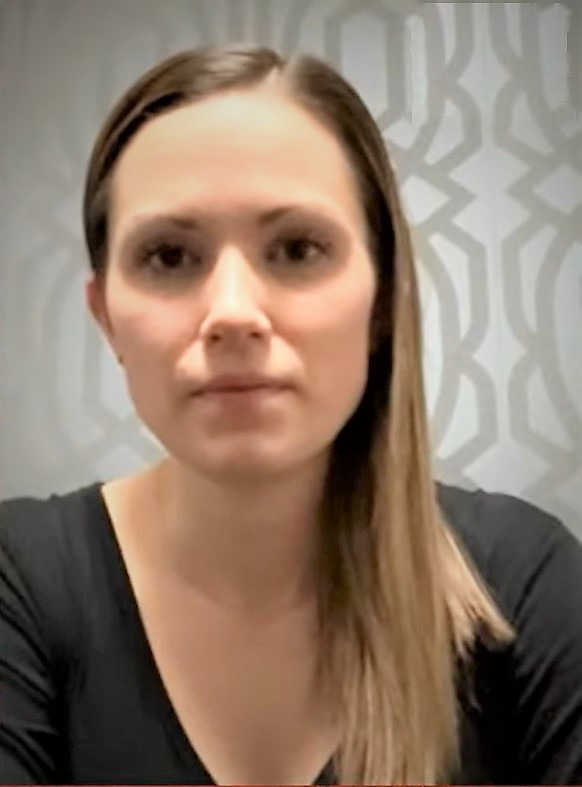
- Walker on CBC Sports "That Curling Show" in 2021
- Born: Laura Crocker; November 19, 1990 (age 35); Toronto, Ontario, Canada

Team
- Curling club: Saville Community SC, Edmonton, AB
- Skip: Serena Gray-Withers
- Third: Catherine Clifford
- Second: Laura Walker
- Lead: Zoe Cinnamon

Curling career
- Member Association: Ontario (2007–2012); Alberta (2012–present); Manitoba (2026)
- Hearts: 5 (2020, 2021, 2022, 2023, 2026)
- World Mixed Doubles Championship: 1 (2018)
- Top CTRS ranking: 5th (2017–18, 2021–22)
Medal record
Women's curling
Representing Alberta
Scotties Tournament of Hearts
Bronze medal – third place	2021 Calgary
Canadian Mixed Doubles Championship
Gold medal – first place	2018 Leduc
Silver medal – second place	2016 Saskatoon
Silver medal – second place	2024 Fredericton
Bronze medal – third place	2019 Fredericton
Representing Manitoba
Scotties Tournament of Hearts
Silver medal – second place	2026 Mississauga
Representing Canada
World Junior Curling Championships
Silver medal – second place	2010 Flims
World Mixed Doubles Championship
Bronze medal – third place	2018 Östersund

Laura Walker (born November 19, 1990, as Laura Crocker) is a Canadian curler from Edmonton, Alberta. She currently plays second on Team Serena Gray-Withers. She is a two-time Canadian University champion, a national junior champion, world junior silver medallist and world mixed doubles bronze medallist. Walker is originally from Scarborough, Ontario.

== Career ==
=== Juniors ===
Walker began her junior curling career as a skip. In 2008, her Scarboro Golf & Country Club rink made it to the provincial junior championships where her team finished with a 2–5 record. In 2010, Walker was invited to join the Rachel Homan junior rink at the second position. The team's regular second, Alison Kreviazuk, was too old to play in juniors that season (but played with the team in World Curling Tour events). The rink would win the provincial championship and the 2010 Canadian Junior Curling Championships, and would then make it to the final of the 2010 World Junior Curling Championships where they lost to Sweden. The following season, Walker and lead Lynn Kreviazuk joined up with the Clancy Grandy junior rink. With Grandy, Walker won her second straight provincial championship but finished with a 5–7 record at the 2011 Canadian Junior Curling Championships, missing the playoffs.

While Walker was finding success with her junior career, she also found success representing Wilfrid Laurier University as a university curler, where she attended school from 2008 to 2012. Walker won the 2011 CIS/CCA Curling Championships defeating Brock University in the final. In her final year at Laurier, Walker would repeat her championship, winning in the final of the 2012 CIS/CCA Curling Championships against Brock once again. Walker graduated that year from Laurier with a BA in Psychology.

=== Women's ===
Following the 2011–12 season, Walker and teammates Sarah Wilkes and Jen Gates moved from Ontario to curl out of Edmonton, Alberta where they were joined by Albertan Rebecca Pattison. Walker played in her first WCT Grand Slam event at the 2012 Curlers Corner Autumn Gold Curling Classic, where her team lost in the quarter-finals. At the second Grand Slam of the season, the Crocker rink repeated that success by finishing in the quarterfinals of the 2012 Manitoba Lotteries Women's Curling Classic. However at the next Slam, the 2012 Colonial Square Ladies Classic her team would miss out at the quarters, by losing in the round of 16. At the 2012 Masters Grand Slam of Curling, the rink went 0–5. The team qualified for the 2013 Alberta Scotties Tournament of Hearts, Crocker's first provincial women's championship appearance. The team began the tournament with four straight victories, but lost both of their playoff games. To wrap up the season, the Crocker rink made it to the quarter-finals of the 2013 Players' Championship. After the season, Wilkes became the team's alternate and was replaced by Erin Carmody at third.

To start the 2013–14 season, the Crocker team played in both the 2013 Curlers Corner Autumn Gold Curling Classic and the 2013 Manitoba Liquor & Lotteries Women's Classic, failing to make the playoffs in either event. Her team played in the 2013 Canadian Olympic Curling Pre-Trials, winning two games, but not qualifying for the Olympic Trials. Next, Walker played in the 2013 Winter Universiade with her Laurier University rink which included Wilkes, Gates and lead Cheryl Kreviazuk. She would lead the team to a 4–5 record, missing the playoffs. Walker finished the season by playing third for Val Sweeting at the 2014 Players' Championship, where they would miss the playoffs.

Effective as of March 11, 2014, the team announced that Chelsea Carey would take over as skip of the team. Walker would move to third and Gates would remain at lead. Wilkes has left the team. Taylor McDonald was recruited to play second for the team, while Carmody left the team. The team would win two tour titles that season, the HDF Insurance Shoot-Out and the Boundary Ford Curling Classic. The team played in three slams that season, making the playoffs in only the 2014 Canadian Open of Curling, where they lost in the quarterfinals. At the 2015 Alberta Scotties Tournament of Hearts, the team would lose in the finals.

Following the 2014–15 season, Carey formed a new team, and was replaced by Kelsey Rocque as the team's skip. In their first season together, the Rocque rink won the Red Deer Curling Classic and the CCT Uiseong Masters on the tour. The team played in five slams, making it to the quarterfinals in four events. Team Rocque played in the 2016 Alberta Scotties Tournament of Hearts, but failed to make the playoffs. The team also played in the 2015 Canada Cup of Curling, but finished with a 2–4 record, missing the playoffs. The following season, the team had less success on the tour. They would play in four slams, making it to the quarterfinals in just one event, the 2016 GSOC Tour Challenge. The team played in the 2016 Canada Cup of Curling, but once again missed the playoffs with a 2–4 record. In the 2017–18 season, Team Rocque would win the Curl Mesabi Classic and would play in three slams, making it to the quarterfinals at just the 2018 Meridian Canadian Open. The team played in the 2017 Canadian Olympic Curling Pre-Trials, losing in the playoffs. Midway through the season, Walker took over skipping duties of the team, but remained throwing third stones. The Rocque rink played with the new arrangement at the 2018 Alberta Scotties Tournament of Hearts, where they narrowly missed the playoffs. The next month it was announced that the team would be splitting up. In their final event together, with Rocque off the team, the rink would lose in a tiebreaker at the 2018 Players' Championship with Walker skipping and Kendra Lilly brought in to play third.

For the 2018–19 season, Walker skipped a new team of Cathy Overton-Clapham, Lori Olson-Johns and Laine Peters. They played in four of seven Slams and were knocked out of the 2019 Alberta Scotties Tournament of Hearts 9–2 by Jodi Marthaller. Outside of her team, Walker spared in two other Grand Slam events. She replaced Joanne Courtney on Team Homan at the Players' Championship partway through the event and replaced Allison Flaxey at skip for her team at the 2019 Champions Cup, where they had a quarterfinal finish.

On March 15, 2019, it was announced that Walker was once again skipping a new team of Kate Cameron, Taylor McDonald and Nadine Scotland for the 2019–20 season. They did not qualify for the playoffs in their first two events, the 2019 Cargill Curling Training Centre Icebreaker and the Booster Juice Shoot-Out before winning the 2019 Mother Club Fall Curling Classic after posting a perfect 7–0 record. Walker won her first provincial title this season as well, defeating former teammate Kelsey Rocque 7–4 in the 2020 Alberta Scotties Tournament of Hearts final. Representing Alberta at the 2020 Scotties Tournament of Hearts, Walker led her team to a 3–4 record, failing to qualify for the championship round. It would be the team's last event of the season as both the Players' Championship and the Champions Cup Grand Slam events were cancelled due to the COVID-19 pandemic.

Due to the pandemic, the 2021 Alberta Scotties were cancelled, so Curling Alberta appointed the Walker rink to represent the province at the 2021 Scotties Tournament of Hearts. Walker's regular lead Nadine Scotland, who was three-months pregnant, opted not to play in the tournament, which was being held in a "bubble" due to the pandemic. She was replaced by Rachel Brown. Due to COVID restrictions, there was no one in attendance for the event, including family members, but Walker, was allowed to bring her five month-old son and her husband as a caregiver. Her son was the only baby in the "bubble". In the tournament itself, Walker led Alberta to a 9–3 round robin record, tied for third with Manitoba, skipped by Jennifer Jones. Walker beat Jones in the tiebreaker, but lost in the semifinal against the defending champion Team Canada rink, skipped by Kerri Einarson, settling for a bronze medal. Walker returned to the bubble in April 2021 as she was scheduled to spare for the Rachel Homan rink for the only two Grand Slam events of the abbreviated season. Up until the day the event started, Emma Miskew, Homan's third, was supposed to skip the team as Homan had just given birth to her second child three weeks earlier, with Walker substituting at third. However, Homan returned in time for the event, leaving the team's original lineup intact. The Homan rink won the 2021 Champions Cup and finished runner-up at the 2021 Players' Championship. Walker did not play in any games for the team.

In just their second event of the 2021–22 season, Team Walker reached the final of the 2021 Alberta Curling Series: Saville Shoot-Out where they were defeated by Kim Eun-jung. Due to the pandemic, the qualification process for the 2021 Canadian Olympic Curling Trials had to be modified to qualify enough teams for the championship. In these modifications, Curling Canada created the 2021 Canadian Curling Trials Direct-Entry Event, an event where five teams would compete to try to earn one of three spots into the 2021 Canadian Olympic Curling Trials. Team Walker qualified for the Trials Direct-Entry Event due to their CTRS ranking from the 2019–20 season. At the event, the team went 2–2 through the round robin, qualifying for the tiebreaker round where they faced British Columbia's Corryn Brown. After being defeated by Brown in the first game, Team Walker won the second tiebreaker to secure their spot at the Olympic Trials. The team had one more event before the Trials, the 2021 National Grand Slam, where they lost in the quarterfinals to Tracy Fleury. A few weeks later, they competed in the Olympic Trials, held November 20 to 28 in Saskatoon, Saskatchewan. At the event, the team had mixed results, ultimately finishing in sixth place with a 3–5 record.

A few weeks before the Alberta provincial championship, Team Walker won the Alberta Curling Series: Avonair tour event, defeating Casey Scheidegger in the final. They then competed in the 2022 Alberta Scotties Tournament of Hearts, where they posted a 6–1 record through the round robin. This created a three-way tie between Walker, Scheidegger and the Kelsey Rocque rink, however, as Walker had to best draw shot challenge between the three rinks, they advanced directly to the final. There, they met the Scheidegger rink, who defeated Rocque in the semifinal. After a tight final, Walker secured the victory for her team with a draw to the eight-foot to win 6–5. This qualified the team for their second straight national championship. At the 2022 Scotties Tournament of Hearts, the team could not replicate their success from 2021, finishing the round robin with a 3–5 record and missing the playoffs. Team Walker wrapped up their season at the 2022 Players' Championship where they missed the playoffs.

On March 17, 2022, the team announced that they would be disbanding at the end of the 2021–22 season. Walker then announced that she would be focusing solely on mixed doubles for the next Olympic quadrennial with partner Kirk Muyres. Despite this, she became the full-time alternate on Team Kaitlyn Lawes as both Lawes and Njegovan went on maternity leave during the year. She first stepped in for the team at the 2022 Stu Sells 1824 Halifax Classic where they won the event title. She also helped the team reach the quarterfinals of the 2022 Masters. At the 2023 Scotties Tournament of Hearts, she slotted into the third position for the team with Njegovan on leave. After a 5–3 record, they lost in a tiebreaker to Nova Scotia, skipped by Christina Black. Walker also played for the team at three other Slams, the 2023 Canadian Open, the 2023 Players' Championship and the 2023 Champions Cup where they failed to reach the playoffs.

Walker would join Team Kaitlyn Lawes as their alternate for the 2025–26 curling season. Team Lawes would compete at the 2025 Canadian Olympic Curling Trials, with a chance to represent Canada at the 2026 Winter Olympics. At the Trials, Team Lawes would finish with a 4–3 record, just missing out on the playoffs due to Draw Shot Challenge (last stone draw). Lawes would continue the season at the 2026 RME Women of the Rings, the Manitoba women's curling championship, where they would go undefeated before losing to Team Peterson 9–7 in the championship final. However, due to Rachel Homan having to withdraw from the 2026 Scotties Tournament of Hearts as the Scotties schedule conflicted with the Olympics, an additional spot was instead given to Lawes as the highest CTRS ranked non-qualified team following the completion of all provincial and territorial championships. At the 2026 Scotties, Walker would replace regular second on Team Lawes, Jocelyn Peterman, as Peterman was competing at the 2026 Winter Olympics. Team Lawes would make the most of their second chance, going undefeated with an 8–0 record in round-robin play and beating Kerri Einarson 10–2 in the 1v2 game to qualify for the Scotties final. However, similarly to their record at the 2026 Manitoba championships where they went undefeated throughout the championship but lost in the final, Team Lawes would lose in a rematch against Einarson 4–3 in the Scotties final, finishing with a silver medal.

=== Mixed doubles ===
In mixed doubles play, Walker plays with Kirk Muyres. She previously played with husband Geoff Walker until 2018. With Walker, at the 2016 Canadian Mixed Doubles Curling Trials, the pair would make it all the way to the finals before losing to the Jocelyn Peterman / Brett Gallant duo. The pair played in the 2018 Canadian Mixed Doubles Curling Olympic Trials, where they made it to the playoffs, but were eliminated after winning two playoff games. With her husband playing in the 2018 World Men's Curling Championship, Walker had to find a new doubles partner in Muyres for the 2018 Canadian Mixed Doubles Curling Championship. The pair found immediate success, winning the event, defeating Colton Lott and Kadriana Sahaidak in the final. The pair represented Canada at the 2018 World Mixed Doubles Curling Championship, where they won a bronze medal. They also represented Canada in the first leg of the 2018 Curling World Cup in Suzhou, China, which they would end up winning, defeating the United States (Korey Dropkin and Sarah Anderson) in the final. At the 2021 Canadian Mixed Doubles Curling Championship, Walker and Muyres went 6–0 through the round robin before losing in the 3 vs. 4 game to Kerri Einarson and Brad Gushue, placing fourth. In the next championship, the 2023 Canadian Mixed Doubles Curling Championship, the team again went undefeated in the round robin before losing in the quarterfinals to Brittany Tran and Aaron Sluchinski. Following the 2021-22 season, both Walker and Muyres decided to focus their careers strictly to the Mixed Doubles discipline to push for an Olympic appearance in 2026. Walker and Muyres would qualify for the 2025 Canadian Mixed Doubles Curling Olympic Trials, however would narrowly miss the playoffs, tied with Jennifer Jones and Brent Laing with each having 4–3 records after round robin play, but Jones/Laing winning the tie-breaker 9–3 in their head-to-head game.

== Personal life ==
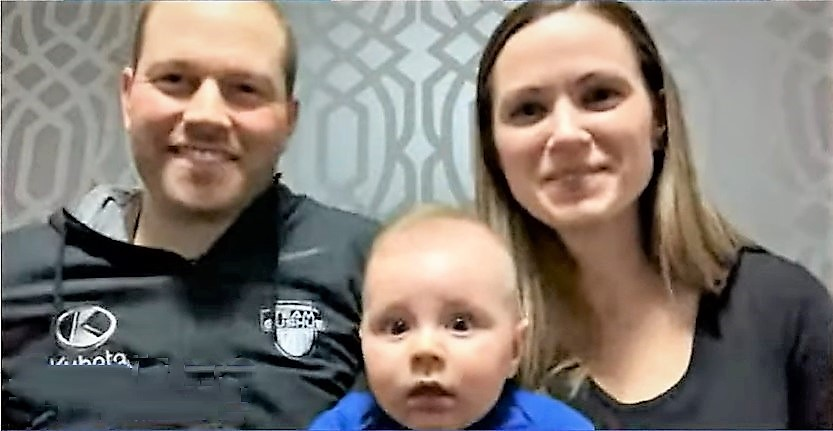
Geoff and Laura Walker with their son on CBC Sports "That Curling Show" in 2021

She is married to Geoff Walker of Team Gushue, and has two children. She is employed as a mortgage broker for Mortgage Design Group.

== Year-by-year statistics ==
=== Team events ===
Year	Team	Position	Event	Finish	Record	Pct. (Note: Round robin only)
2008	Crocker (SGCC)	Skip	Ontario Juniors		2–5	–
2010	Homan (OCC)	Second	Ontario Juniors	1st	7–1	–
2010	Ontario (Homan)	Second	Canadian Juniors	1st	13–0	81
2010	Canada (Homan)	Second	World Juniors	2nd	9–2	–
2011	Grandy (KWGC)	Second	Ontario Juniors	1st	7–1	–
2011	Ontario (Grandy)	Second	Canadian Juniors	9th	5–7	74
2011	Laurier (Crocker)	Skip	CIS	1st	7–1	
2012	Laurier (Crocker)	Skip	CIS	1st	7–1	
2013	Crocker (SSC)	Skip	Alberta STOH	3rd	4–3	
2013	Crocker (SSC)	Skip	COCT – Pre	DNQ	2–3	67
2013	Canada (Crocker)	Skip	Winter Universiade	6th	4–5	
2015	Carey (SSC)	Third	Alberta STOH	2nd	6–3	
2015	Rocque (SSC)	Third	Canada Cup	5th	2–4	72
2016	Rocque (SSC)	Third	Alberta STOH	DNQ	1–3	
2016	Rocque (SSC)	Third	Canada Cup	6th	2–4	73
2017	Rocque (SSC)	Third	COCT – Pre	4th	4–5	75
2018	Crocker (SSC)	Skip (Note: Threw third rocks)	Alberta STOH	DNQ	3–3	
2018	Walker (SSC)	Skip	Canada Cup	5th	3–4	73
2019	Walker (Glencoe)	Skip	Alberta STOH	DNQ	2–3	
2020	Walker (SSC)	Skip	Alberta STOH	1st	9–0	
2020	Alberta (Walker)	Skip	2020 STOH	11th	3–4	82
2021	Alberta (Walker)	Skip	2021 STOH	3rd	10–4	78
2021	Walker (SSC)	Skip	COCT – Dir.	3rd	3–3	
2021	Walker	Skip	2021 COCT	6th	3–5	78
2022	Walker (SSC)	Skip	Alberta STOH	1st	7–1	
2022	Alberta (Walker)	Skip	2022 STOH	13th	3–5	73
2023	Wild Card 1 (Lawes)	Third	2023 STOH	T7th	5–4	84
Scotties Tournament of Hearts Totals					21–17	79
Olympic Curling Trial Totals					3–5	78

=== Mixed doubles ===
Year	Partner	Event	Finish	Record	Pct.
2016	Geoff Walker	CMDCT	2nd	9–1	
2018	Geoff Walker	CMDCOT	T7th	8–2	79
2018	Kirk Muyres	CMDCC	1st	9–1	82
2018	Kirk Muyres	2018 WCC	3rd	9–2	72 (Note: Round robin only)
2018	Kirk Muyres	CWC	1st	6–1	
2019	Kirk Muyres	CMDCC	T3rd	7–2	79
2019	Kirk Muyres	CWC	2nd	5–2	
2021	Kirk Muyres	CMDCC	4th	7–2	80
World Championship Totals				9–2	72
Olympic Curling Trial Totals				8–2	79

== Teams ==
Season	Skip	Third	Second	Lead
2009–10	Rachel Homan	Emma Miskew	Laura Crocker	Lynn Kreviazuk
2010–11	Clancy Grandy	Sarah Wilkes	Laura Crocker	Lynn Kreviazuk
2011–12	Laura Crocker	Sarah Wilkes	Jen Gates	Clancy Grandy
2012–13	Laura Crocker	Sarah Wilkes	Rebecca Stretch	Jen Gates
2013–14	Laura Crocker	Erin Carmody	Rebecca Stretch	Jen Gates
2014–15	Chelsea Carey	Laura Crocker	Taylor McDonald	Jen Gates
2015–16	Kelsey Rocque	Laura Crocker	Taylor McDonald	Jen Gates
2016–17	Kelsey Rocque	Laura Crocker	Taylor McDonald	Jen Gates
2017–18	Kelsey Rocque	Laura Crocker	Taylor McDonald	Jen Gates
2018–19	Laura Walker	Cathy Overton-Clapham	Lori Olson-Johns	Laine Peters
2019–20	Laura Walker	Kate Cameron	Taylor McDonald	Nadine Scotland
2020–21	Laura Walker	Kate Cameron	Taylor McDonald	Nadine Scotland; Rachel Brown (Note: Scotland was replaced by Rachel Brown for the 2021 Scotties Tournament of Hearts. Due to the COVID-19 pandemic, Scotland only played one game for the team that season)
2021–22	Laura Walker	Kate Cameron	Taylor McDonald	Nadine Scotland
2026–27	Serena Gray-Withers	Catherine Clifford	Laura Walker	Zoe Cinnamon

== Grand Slam record ==
Key
C	Champion
F	Lost in Final
SF	Lost in Semifinal
QF	Lost in Quarterfinals
R16	Lost in the round of 16
Q	Did not advance to playoffs
T2	Played in Tier 2 event
DNP	Did not participate in event
N/A	Not a Grand Slam event that season

Event	2012–13	2013–14	2014–15	2015–16	2016–17	2017–18	2018–19	2019–20	2020–21	2021–22	2022–23	2023–24	2024–25	2025–26	2026–27
Invitational	N/A	N/A	N/A	QF	QF	T2	QF	T2	N/A	N/A	DNP	DNP	DNP	DNP	DNP
Masters	Q	DNP	Q	DNP	Q	DNP	Q	DNP	N/A	DNP	QF (Note: Walker spared for Kaitlyn Lawes.)	DNP	DNP	DNP	Q
National	N/A	N/A	N/A	QF	Q	Q	DNP	F (Note: Walker substituted for Dawn McEwen on Team Jones.)	N/A	QF	DNP	DNP	DNP	DNP	DNP
Open	N/A	N/A	QF	Q	Q	QF	QF	Q	N/A	N/A	Q (Note: Walker spared for Selena Njegovan on Team Lawes.)	DNP	DNP	DNP	
Players'	QF	Q	DNP	QF	DNP	Q	Q (Note: Walker substituted for Joanne Courtney on Team Homan partway through the event.)	N/A	DNP	Q	Q	DNP	DNP	DNP	
Champions Cup	N/A	N/A	N/A	QF	DNP	DNP	QF (Note: Walker spared for Allison Flaxey.)	N/A	DNP	DNP	Q	N/A	N/A	N/A	N/A

=== Former events ===
Event	2012–13	2013–14	2014–15	2015–16	2016–17	2017–18	2018–19
Elite 10	N/A	N/A	N/A	N/A	N/A	N/A	QF
Autumn Gold	QF	Q	Q	N/A	N/A	N/A	N/A
Colonial Square	R16	DNP	DNP	N/A	N/A	N/A	N/A
Manitoba Liquor & Lotteries	QF	Q	N/A	N/A	N/A	N/A	N/A
