= 2013 The Shoot-Out =

- Host city: Edmonton, Alberta
- Arena: Saville Sports Centre
- Dates: September 12–15
- Men's winner: (Alberta) Kevin Martin
- Curling club: Saville SC, Edmonton
- Skip: Kevin Martin
- Third: David Nedohin
- Second: Marc Kennedy
- Lead: Ben Hebert
- Finalist: (Saskatchewan) Steve Laycock
- Women's winner: (Alberta) Crystal Webster
- Curling club: Glencoe CC, Calgary
- Skip: Crystal Webster
- Third: Cathy Overton-Clapham
- Second: Geri-Lynn Ramsay
- Lead: Samantha Preston
- Finalist: (Saskatchewan) Chantelle Eberle

The 2013 Shoot-Out was held from September 12 to 15 at the Saville Sports Centre in Edmonton, Alberta as part of the 2013–14 World Curling Tour. Both the men's and women's events are being held in a triple-knockout format. The purse for the men's event was CAD$18,000, of which the winner, Kevin Martin, received CAD$5,000, while the purse for the women's event was CAD$26,000, of which the winner, Crystal Webster, received CAD$5,000. Martin defeated Steve Laycock in the final with a score of 3–2, while Webster defeated Chantelle Eberle in the final with a score of 10–6 in seven ends.

== Men ==
=== Teams ===
The teams are listed as follows:

Skip	Third	Second	Lead	Locale
Ted Appelman	Shawn Donnelly	Landon Bucholz	Bryce Bucholz	Edmonton, Alberta
Tom Appelman	Nathan Connolly	Brandon Klassen	Parker Konschuh	Edmonton, Alberta
Matthew Blandford	Darren Moulding	Brent Hamilton	Brad Chyz	Calgary, Alberta
Brendan Bottcher	Micky Lizmore	Bradley Thiessen	Karrick Martin	Edmonton, Alberta
Tom Brewster	Greg Drummond	Scott Andrews	Michael Goodfellow	Stirling, Scotland
Brady Clark	Sean Beighton	Darren Lehto	Phil Tilker	(Washington (state)) Lynnwood, Washington
Jamie King	Blake MacDonald	Scott Pfeifer	Jeff Erickson	Edmonton, Alberta
Steve Laycock	Kirk Muyres	Colton Flasch	Dallan Muyres	Saskatoon, Saskatchewan
Kevin Martin	David Nedohin	Marc Kennedy	Ben Hebert	Edmonton, Alberta
Sven Michel	Claudio Pätz	Sandro Trolliet	Simon Gempeler	Adelboden, Switzerland
Kevin Park	Barry Chwedoruk	Eric Richard	Doug Stambaugh	Edmonton, Alberta
Chris Lemishka (fourth)	Dean Ross (skip)	Tyler Pfeiffer	Neal Woloschuk	Edmonton, Alberta
Robert Schlender	Aaron Sluchinski	Justin Sluchinski	Dylan Webster	Airdrie, Alberta
Thomas Scoffin	Dylan Gousseau	Jaques Bellamy	Andrew O'Dell	Edmonton, Alberta
John Shuster	Jeff Isaacson	Jared Zezel	John Landsteiner	Duluth, Minnesota
Wade White	Kevin Tym	Dan Holowaychuk	George White	Edmonton, Alberta

=== Knockout results ===
The draw is listed as follows:

==== A event ====
First Knockout		Semifinals		Qualifier 1
(Alberta) Kevin Martin	6
(Alberta) Thomas Scoffin	4	(Alberta) Kevin Martin	8
(Washington (state)) Brady Clark	7	(Washington (state)) Brady Clark	4
(Alberta) Wade White	5			(Alberta) Kevin Martin	6
(Scotland) David Murdoch	5			(Alberta) Tom Appelman	2
(Alberta) Dean Ross	3	(Scotland) David Murdoch	5
(Alberta) Brendan Bottcher	5	(Alberta) Tom Appelman	8
(Alberta) Tom Appelman	6

First Knockout		Semifinals		Qualifier 2
(Switzerland) Sven Michel	7
(Alberta) Kevin Park	5	(Switzerland) Sven Michel	5
(Alberta) Jamie King	6	(Alberta) Jamie King	6
(Alberta) Matthew Blandford	4			(Alberta) Jamie King	8
(Saskatchewan) Steve Laycock	7			(Saskatchewan) Steve Laycock	5
(Alberta) Ted Appelman	4	(Saskatchewan) Steve Laycock	3
(Minnesota) John Shuster	8	(Minnesota) John Shuster	2
(Alberta) Robert Schlender	5

==== B event ====
Second Knockout
(Alberta) Thomas Scoffin	5
(Alberta) Wade White	4
(Alberta) Dean Ross	3
(Alberta) Brendan Bottcher	7

Quarterfinals
(Minnesota) John Shuster	8
(Alberta) Thomas Scoffin	6
(Switzerland) Sven Michel	2
(Alberta) Brendan Bottcher	3

Semifinals
(Minnesota) John Shuster	7
(Alberta) Brendan Bottcher	1

Qualifier 3
(Minnesota) John Shuster	1
(Saskatchewan) Steve Laycock	2

Second Knockout
(Alberta) Kevin Park	4
(Alberta) Matthew Blandford	6
(Alberta) Ted Appelman	6
(Alberta) Robert Schlender	3

Quarterfinals
(Scotland) David Murdoch	7
(Alberta) Matthew Blandford	2
(Washington (state)) Brady Clark	7
(Alberta) Ted Appelman	5

Semifinals
(Scotland) David Murdoch	6
(Washington (state)) Brady Clark	5

Qualifier 4
(Scotland) David Murdoch	7
(Alberta) Tom Appelman	5

==== C event ====
Third Knockout		Qualifier 5
(Alberta) Wade White	5
(Alberta) Dean Ross	4	(Alberta) Wade White	2
		(Washington (state)) Brady Clark	7

Third Knockout		Qualifier 6
(Alberta) Matthew Blandford	7
(Alberta) Ted Appelman	2	(Alberta) Matthew Blandford	2
		(Minnesota) John Shuster	6

Third Knockout		Qualifier 7
(Alberta) Kevin Park	6
(Alberta) Robert Schlender	4	(Alberta) Kevin Park	3
		(Alberta) Brendan Bottcher	4

Third Knockout		Qualifier 8
(Alberta) Thomas Scoffin	3
(Switzerland) Sven Michel	7	(Switzerland) Sven Michel	5
		(Alberta) Tom Appelman	3

=== Playoffs ===
The playoffs draw is listed as follows:

Quarterfinals
(Alberta) Jamie King	3
(Minnesota) John Shuster	7
(Saskatchewan) Steve Laycock	5
(Alberta) Brendan Bottcher	4
(Alberta) Kevin Martin	9
(Washington (state)) Brady Clark	4
(Scotland) David Murdoch	3
(Switzerland) Sven Michel	4

Semifinals
(Minnesota) John Shuster	3
(Saskatchewan) Steve Laycock	4
(Alberta) Kevin Martin	6
(Switzerland) Sven Michel	3

Final
(Saskatchewan) Steve Laycock	2
(Alberta) Kevin Martin	3

== Women ==
=== Teams ===
The teams are listed as follows:

Skip	Third	Second	Lead	Locale
Cheryl Bernard	Susan O'Connor	Lori Olson-Johns	Shannon Aleksic	Calgary, Alberta
Erika Brown	Debbie McCormick	Jessica Schultz	Ann Swisshelm	Madison, Wisconsin
Chelsea Carey	Kristy McDonald	Kristen Foster	Lindsay Titheridge	Winnipeg, Manitoba
Laura Crocker	Erin Carmody	Rebecca Pattinson	Jen Gates	Edmonton, Alberta
Delia DeJong	Amy Janko	Brittany Whittemore	Stephanie Yanishewski	Grande Prairie, Alberta
Chantelle Eberle	Cindy Ricci	Nancy Inglis	Debbie Lozinski	Regina, Saskatchewan
Kelly Erickson	Lindsay Makichuk	Kristina Hadden	Alison Kotylak	Edmonton, Alberta
Lisa Eyamie	Desirée Owen	Jodi Marthaller	Stephanie Malekoff	Grande Prairie, Alberta
Tiffany Game	Vanessa Pouliot	Jennifer Van Wieren	Melissa Pierce	Edmonton, Alberta
Teryn Hamilton	Hayley Furst	Jody Keim	Heather Hansen	Calgary, Alberta
Amber Holland	Jolene Campbell	Dailene Sivertson	Brooklyn Lemon	Regina, Saskatchewan
Heather Jensen	Darah Provencal	Shana Snell	Morgan Muise	Calgary, Alberta
Shannon Kleibrink	Bronwen Webster	Kalynn Park	Chelsey Matson	Calgary, Alberta
Sarah Koltun	Chelsea Duncan	Patty Wallingham	Andrea Sinclair	Whitehorse, Yukon
Stefanie Lawton	Sherry Anderson	Sherri Singler	Marliese Kasner	Saskatoon, Saskatchewan
Victorya Moiseeva	Nkeiruka Ezekh	Ekaterina Antonova	Aleksandra Saitova	Moscow, Russia
Heather Nedohin	Beth Iskiw	Jessica Mair	Laine Peters	Edmonton, Alberta
Amy Nixon	Nadine Chyz	Whitney Eckstrand	Heather Rogers	Calgary, Alberta
Alina Pätz	Nadine Lehmann	Nicole Schwägli	Nicole Dünki	Basel, Switzerland
Cassie Potter	Jamie Haskell	Jackie Lemke	Steph Sambor	St. Paul, Minnesota
Kelsey Rocque	Keely Brown	Taylor McDonald	Claire Tully	Edmonton, Alberta
Casey Scheidegger	Denise Kinghorn	Jessie Scheidegger	Kimberly Anderson	Lethbridge, Alberta
Kelly Scott	Jeanna Schraeder	Sasha Carter	Sarah Wazney	Kelowna, British Columbia
Anna Sidorova	Liudmila Privivkova	Margarita Fomina	Ekaterina Galkina	Moscow, Russia
Renée Sonnenberg	Lawnie McDonald	Cary-Anne McTaggart	Rona Pasika	Grande Prairie, Alberta
Barb Spencer	Katie Spencer	Ainsley Champagne	Raunora Westcott	Winnipeg, Manitoba
Valerie Sweeting	Dana Ferguson	Joanne Taylor	Rachelle Pidherny	Alberta
Taylore Theroux	Jesse Iles	Holly Jamieson	Kataryna Hagglund	Edmonton, Alberta
Silvana Tirinzoni	Marlene Albrecht	Esther Neuenschwander	Manuela Siegrist	Aarau, Switzerland
Crystal Webster	Cathy Overton-Clapham	Geri-Lynn Ramsay	Samantha Preston	Calgary, Alberta
Holly Whyte	Heather Steele	Michelle Dykstra	Amber Cheveldave	Grande Prairie, Alberta

=== Knockout results ===
The draw is listed as follows:

==== A event ====
First Knockout
(Saskatchewan) Stefanie Lawton	3
(Yukon) Sarah Koltun	6
(Saskatchewan) Chantelle Eberle	4
(Alberta) Casey Scheidegger	3
(Alberta) Laura Crocker	6
(Alberta) Heather Jensen	5
(Wisconsin) Erika Brown	6
(Minnesota) Cassie Potter	4
(Manitoba) Chelsea Carey	7
(Alberta) Kelsey Rocque	4
(British Columbia) Kelly Scott	7
(Alberta) Tiffany Game	6
(Alberta) Shannon Kleibrink	6
(Alberta) Teryn Hamilton	8
(Alberta) Valerie Sweeting	10
(Alberta) Lisa Eyamie	4

Quarterfinals
(Yukon) Sarah Koltun	4
(Saskatchewan) Chantelle Eberle	7
(Alberta) Laura Crocker	4
(Wisconsin) Erika Brown	5
(Manitoba) Chelsea Carey	8
(British Columbia) Kelly Scott	5
(Alberta) Teryn Hamilton	2
(Alberta) Valerie Sweeting	7

Semifinals
(Saskatchewan) Chantelle Eberle	5
(Wisconsin) Erika Brown	4
(Manitoba) Chelsea Carey	7
(Alberta) Valerie Sweeting	4

Qualifier 1
(Saskatchewan) Chantelle Eberle	7
(Manitoba) Chelsea Carey	2

First Knockout
(Russia) Anna Sidorova	7
(Alberta) Taylore Theroux	2
(Manitoba) Barb Spencer	4
(Switzerland) Alina Pätz	5
(Alberta) Renée Sonnenberg	4
(Alberta) Kelly Erickson	3
(Alberta) Cheryl Bernard	5
(Alberta) Holly Whyte	3
(Alberta) Heather Nedohin	5
(Alberta) Delia DeJong	7
(Alberta) Crystal Webster	7
(Alberta) Amy Nixon	2
(Switzerland) Silvana Tirinzoni	3
(Russia) Victorya Moiseeva	6
(Saskatchewan) Amber Holland	6
(Alberta) Jessie Kaufman	3

Quarterfinals
(Russia) Anna Sidorova	5
(Switzerland) Alina Pätz	4
(Alberta) Renée Sonnenberg	4
(Alberta) Cheryl Bernard	3
(Alberta) Delia DeJong	4
(Alberta) Crystal Webster	9
(Russia) Victorya Moiseeva	3
(Saskatchewan) Amber Holland	6

Semifinals
(Russia) Anna Sidorova	4
(Alberta) Renée Sonnenberg	2
(Alberta) Crystal Webster	5
(Saskatchewan) Amber Holland	3

Qualifier 2
(Russia) Anna Sidorova	4
(Alberta) Crystal Webster	5

==== B event ====
Second Knockout
(Saskatchewan) Stefanie Lawton	5
(Alberta) Casey Scheidegger	4
(Minnesota) Cassie Potter	10
(Alberta) Heather Jensen	6

Quarterfinals
(Russia) Victorya Moiseeva	1
(Saskatchewan) Stefanie Lawton	5
(Alberta) Delia DeJong	9
(Minnesota) Cassie Potter	7

Semifinals
(Saskatchewan) Stefanie Lawton	5
(Alberta) Renée Sonnenberg	7
(Alberta) Delia DeJong	3
(Alberta) Valerie Sweeting	7

To Qualifier 3
(Alberta) Renée Sonnenberg	4
(Alberta) Valerie Sweeting	5
Qualifier 3
(Alberta) Valerie Sweeting	8
(Manitoba) Chelsea Carey	5

Second Knockout
(Alberta) Kelsey Rocque	5
(Alberta) Tiffany Game	7
(Alberta) Shannon Kleibrink	8
(Alberta) Lisa Eyamie	1

Quarterfinals
(Alberta) Cheryl Bernard	4
(Alberta) Tiffany Game	6
(Switzerland) Alina Pätz	7
(Alberta) Shannon Kleibrink	6

Semifinals
(Alberta) Tiffany Game	3
(Switzerland) Alina Pätz	4

To Qualifier 3
(Switzerland) Alina Pätz	1
(Manitoba) Chelsea Carey	8

Second Knockout
(Alberta) Taylore Theroux	6
(Manitoba) Barb Spencer	5
(Alberta) Kelly Erickson	2
(Alberta) Holly Whyte	3

Quarterfinals
(Alberta) Teryn Hamilton	6
(Alberta) Taylore Theroux	5
(British Columbia) Kelly Scott	9
(Alberta) Holly Whyte	1

Semifinals
(Alberta) Teryn Hamilton	2
(Saskatchewan) Amber Holland	6
(British Columbia) Kelly Scott	3
(Wisconsin) Erika Brown	9

To Qualifier 4
(Saskatchewan) Amber Holland	6
(Wisconsin) Erika Brown	5
Qualifier 4
(Saskatchewan) Amber Holland	3
(Alberta) Heather Nedohin	6

Second Knockout
(Alberta) Heather Nedohin	7
(Alberta) Amy Nixon	4
(Switzerland) Silvana Tirinzoni	4
(Alberta) Jessie Kaufman	7

Quarterfinals
(Alberta) Laura Crocker	5
(Alberta) Heather Nedohin	8
(Yukon) Sarah Koltun	5
(Alberta) Jessie Kaufman	6

Semifinals
(Alberta) Heather Nedohin	3
(Alberta) Jessie Kaufman	2

To Qualifier 4
(Alberta) Heather Nedohin	8
(Russia) Anna Sidorova	1

==== C event ====
Third Knockout
(Alberta) Casey Scheidegger	6
(Alberta) Heather Jensen	2
(Alberta) Kelsey Rocque	9
(Alberta) Lisa Eyamie	2

Quarterfinals
(Alberta) Teryn Hamilton	2
(Alberta) Casey Scheidegger	7
(British Columbia) Kelly Scott	3
(Alberta) Kelsey Rocque	9

Semifinals
(Alberta) Casey Scheidegger	4
(Alberta) Kelsey Rocque	8

Qualifier 5
(Alberta) Kelsey Rocque	5
(Manitoba) Chelsea Carey	7

Third Knockout
(Alberta) Cheryl Bernard	7
(Alberta) Shannon Kleibrink	2

Quarterfinals
(Russia) Victorya Moiseeva	5
(Minnesota) Cassie Potter	3
(Alberta) Jessie Kaufman	0
(Alberta) Cheryl Bernard	5

Semifinals
(Russia) Victorya Moiseeva	6
(Russia) Anna Sidorova	8
(Alberta) Cheryl Bernard	6
(Wisconsin) Erika Brown	5

Qualifier 6
(Russia) Anna Sidorova	4
(Alberta) Cheryl Bernard	2

Third Knockout
(Alberta) Laura Crocker	7
(Yukon) Sarah Koltun	3

Quarterfinals
(Alberta) Tiffany Game	2
(Alberta) Laura Crocker	7
(Alberta) Taylore Theroux	3
(Alberta) Holly Whyte	10

Semifinals
(Alberta) Laura Crocker	7
(Alberta) Renée Sonnenberg	4
(Alberta) Holly Whyte	4
(Switzerland) Alina Pätz	6

Qualifier 7
(Alberta) Laura Crocker	6
(Switzerland) Alina Pätz	5

Third Knockout
(Manitoba) Barb Spencer	7
(Alberta) Kelly Erickson	2
(Alberta) Amy Nixon	8
(Switzerland) Silvana Tirinzoni	3

Quarterfinals
(Saskatchewan) Stefanie Lawton	8
(Manitoba) Barb Spencer	5
(Alberta) Delia DeJong	2
(Alberta) Amy Nixon	8

Semifinals
(Saskatchewan) Stefanie Lawton	6
(Alberta) Amy Nixon	5

Qualifier 8
(Saskatchewan) Stefanie Lawton	5
(Saskatchewan) Amber Holland	3

=== Playoffs ===
The playoffs draw is listed as follows:

Quarterfinals
(Alberta) Crystal Webster	6
(Alberta) Laura Crocker	4
(Alberta) Heather Nedohin	5
(Saskatchewan) Stefanie Lawton	2
(Saskatchewan) Chantelle Eberle	7
(Russia) Anna Sidorova	5
(Alberta) Valerie Sweeting	3
(Manitoba) Chelsea Carey	7

Semifinals
(Alberta) Crystal Webster	5
(Alberta) Heather Nedohin	3
(Saskatchewan) Chantelle Eberle	8
(Manitoba) Chelsea Carey	4

Final
(Alberta) Crystal Webster	10
(Saskatchewan) Chantelle Eberle	6
