= Saville Shootout =

Annual curling tournament in Edmonton, Canada

- Established: 2004
- Host city: Edmonton, Alberta
- Arena: Saville Sports Centre
- Men's purse: $25,000
- Women's purse: $25,000

Current champions (2025)
- Men: (Germany) Benjamin Kapp
- Women: (Alberta) Serena Gray-Withers

Current edition
- 2026 Saville Shootout

Location in Canada

The Saville Shootout is an annual curling tournament, held in September at the Saville Community Sports Centre in Edmonton, Alberta. It is part of the women's tour since 2006 and is one of the first events of the year. The men's event was discontinued after 2015 but was brought back in 2023. It had been running since 2004.

== Event names ==
- 2004: Shamrock Classic Bonspiel
- 2006: Saville Sports Centre Sept. Shoot-Out
- 2007: Boston Pizza September Shoot-Out
- 2008: Boston Pizza Shootout
- 2009: September Shoot-Out
- 2010–2011: The Shoot-Out
- 2012–2013: The Shoot-Out @ the Saville Centre
- 2014–2018: HDF Insurance Shoot-Out
- 2019: Booster Juice Shoot-Out
- 2021: Alberta Curling Series: Saville Shoot-Out
- 2022: Saville Shoot-Out
- 2023–present: Saville Shootout

== Past champions ==
=== Men ===
Year	Winning team	Runner up team	Purse (CAD)
2004	(Alberta) David Nedohin, Randy Ferbey, Scott Pfeifer, Marcel Rocque	(Alberta) Brent Bawel, Jason Lesmeister, Morio Kumagawa, Ian Jensen	$24,000
2006	(Alberta) Robert Schlender, Danny Sherrand, Colin Tanton, Jim Bucholz	(Alberta) Wade White, Blayne Iskiw, Dan Holowaychuk, George White	$15,000
2007	(Saskatchewan) Pat Simmons, Jeff Sharp, Gerry Adam, Steve Laycock	(Alberta) Brent Pierce, Brent MacDonald, Warren Hassall, Brendan Melnyk	$16,000
2008	(Alberta) Ted Appelman, Tom Appelman, Brandon Klassen, Brendan Melnyk	(Saskatchewan) Pat Simmons, Jeff Sharp, Gerry Adam, Steve Laycock	$16,000
2009	(British Columbia) Jim Cotter, Bob Ursel, Kevin Folk, Rick Sawatsky	(Alberta) David Nedohin, Randy Ferbey, Scott Pfeifer, Marcel Rocque	$20,000
2010	(Alberta) Don Walchuk, Chris Schille, D. J. Kidby, Don Bartlett	(Alberta) Ted Appelman, Tom Appelman, Brandon Klassen, Brendan Melnyk	$22,000
2011	(Alberta) Randy Ferbey, David Nedohin, Ted Appelman, Brendan Melnyk	(Alberta) Rob Bucholz, Evan Asmussen, Landon Bucholz, Bryce Bucholz	$26,000
2012	(Alberta) Jamie King, Blake MacDonald, Scott Pfeifer, Jeff Erickson	(Alberta) Charley Thomas, J. D. Lind, Dominic Daemen, Matthew Ng	$26,000
2013	(Alberta) Kevin Martin, David Nedohin, Marc Kennedy, Ben Hebert	(Saskatchewan) Steve Laycock, Kirk Muyres, Colton Flasch, Dallan Muyres	$18,000
2014	(Alberta) Brendan Bottcher, Tom Appelman, Bradley Thiessen, Karrick Martin	(Saskatchewan) Steve Laycock, Kirk Muyres, Colton Flasch, Dallan Muyres	$22,000
2015	(Saskatchewan) Shaun Meachem, Catlin Schneider, Brady Scharback, Aaron Shutra	(Alberta) Brendan Bottcher, Tom Appelman, Bradley Thiessen, Karrick Martin	$22,000
2023	(Alberta) Brendan Bottcher, Marc Kennedy, Brett Gallant, Ben Hebert	(British Columbia) Catlin Schneider, Sterling Middleton, Jason Ginter, Alex Horvath	$25,000
2024	(Saskatchewan) Mike McEwen, Colton Flasch, Kevin Marsh, Dan Marsh	(Manitoba) Jordon McDonald, Dallas Burgess, Calan MacIsaac, Cameron Olafson	$25,000
2025	(British Columbia) Cameron de Jong, Sterling Middleton, Alex Horvath, Corey Chester	(British Columbia) Matthew Blandford, Sébastien Robillard, Cody Johnston, Matthew Fenton	$25,000
2026	(Germany) Benjamin Kapp, Felix Messenzehl, Johannes Scheuerl, Mario Trevisiol	(British Columbia) Jim Cotter, Jared Kolomaya, Connor Deane, Erik Colwell, Brad Wood	$25,000

=== Women ===
Year	Winning team	Runner up team	Purse (CAD)
2006	(Alberta) Renée Sonnenberg, Nikki Smith, Twyla Bruce, Tina McDonald	(Alberta) Cathy King, Lori Olson, Raylene Rocque, Diane Dealy	$10,000
2007	(China) Liu Yin, Wang Bingyu, Yue Qingshuang, Zhou Yan	(Alberta) Glenys Bakker, June Campbell, Shannon Nimmo, Alison Earl	$12,000
2008	(Switzerland) Mirjam Ott, Carmen Schäfer, Valeria Spälty, Janine Greiner	(China) Liu Yin, Wang Bingyu, Yue Qingshuang, Zhou Yan	$18,000
2009	(Alberta) Cathy King, Kaitlyn Lawes, Raylene Rocque, Tracy Bush	(Alberta) Cheryl Bernard, Susan O'Connor, Carolyn Darbyshire, Cori Bartel	$15,000
2010	(Alberta) Heather Nedohin, Cathy Overton-Clapham, Jessica Mair, Laine Peters	(Alberta) Cathy King, Chana Martineau, Raylene Rocque, Karallee Swabb	$17,000
2011	(Saskatchewan) Stefanie Lawton, Sherry Anderson, Sherri Singler, Marliese Kasner	(Alberta) Cheryl Bernard, Susan O'Connor, Lori Olson-Johns, Jennifer Sadleir	$20,000
2012	(Manitoba) Kaitlyn Lawes, Kirsten Wall, Jill Officer, Dawn Askin	(Alberta) Crystal Webster, Erin Carmody, Geri-Lynn Ramsay, Samantha Preston	$20,000
2013	(Alberta) Crystal Webster, Cathy Overton-Clapham, Geri-Lynn Ramsay, Samantha Preston	(Saskatchewan) Chantelle Eberle, Cindy Ricci, Nancy Inglis, Debbie Lozinski	$26,000
2014	(Alberta) Chelsea Carey, Laura Crocker, Taylor McDonald, Jen Gates	(Alberta) Val Sweeting, Andrea Crawford, Dana Ferguson, Rachelle Pidherny	$24,000
2015	(Alberta) Val Sweeting, Lori Olson-Johns, Dana Ferguson, Rachelle Brown	(Saskatchewan) Stefanie Lawton, Trish Paulsen, Sherri Singler, Marliese Kasner	$24,100
2016	(Alberta) Casey Scheidegger, Cary-Anne McTaggart, Jessie Scheidegger, Stephanie Enright	(Scotland) Eve Muirhead, Kelly Schafer, Vicki Adams, Lauren Gray	$32,000
2017	(Scotland) Eve Muirhead, Anna Sloan, Vicki Adams, Lauren Gray	(Sweden) Anna Hasselborg, Sara McManus, Agnes Knochenhauer, Sofia Mabergs	$32,000
2018	(Alberta) Casey Scheidegger, Cary-Anne McTaggart, Jessie Scheidegger, Kristie Moore	(Russia) Alina Kovaleva, Anastasia Bryzgalova, Uliana Vasilyeva, Ekaterina Kuzmina	$32,000
2019	(Manitoba) Kerri Einarson, Val Sweeting, Shannon Birchard, Briane Meilleur	(Alberta) Chelsea Carey, Sarah Wilkes, Dana Ferguson, Rachelle Brown	$32,000
2020	Cancelled		
2021	(South Korea) Kim Eun-jung, Kim Kyeong-ae, Kim Cho-hi, Kim Seon-yeong, Kim Yeong-mi	(Alberta) Laura Walker, Kate Cameron, Taylor McDonald, Heather Rogers	$19,154
2022	(Manitoba) Jennifer Jones, Karlee Burgess, Mackenzie Zacharias, Lauren Lenentine, Emily Zacharias	(Ontario) Rachel Homan (Fourth), Tracy Fleury (Skip), Emma Miskew, Sarah Wilkes	$24,000
2023	(Ontario) Heather Nedohin, Tracy Fleury, Emma Miskew, Sarah Wilkes	(Manitoba) Chelsea Carey, Karlee Burgess, Emily Zacharias, Lauren Lenentine	$25,000
2024	(Japan) Momoha Tabata (Fourth), Miku Nihira (Skip), Sae Yamamoto, Mikoto Nakajima, Ayami Ito	(Japan) Satsuki Fujisawa, Chinami Yoshida, Yumi Suzuki, Yurika Yoshida	$25,000
2025	(Manitoba) Kerri Einarson, Val Sweeting, Shannon Birchard, Karlee Burgess, Krysten Karwacki	(South Korea) Gim Eun-ji, Kim Min-ji, Kim Su-ji, Seol Ye-eun, Seol Ye-ji	$25,000
2026	(Alberta) Serena Gray-Withers, Laura Walker, Kaitlyn Lawes, Zoe Cinnamon	(Alberta) Selena Sturmay, Danielle Schmiemann, Dezaray Hawes, Paige Papley	$25,000
