= 2026 Saville Shootout =

- Host city: Edmonton, Alberta
- Arena: Saville Community Sports Centre
- Dates: September 11–14
- Men's winner: (Germany) Team Kapp
- Curling club: CC Füssen, Füssen
- Skip: Benjamin Kapp
- Third: Felix Messenzehl
- Second: Johannes Scheuerl
- Lead: Mario Trevisiol
- Coach: Ryan Sherrard
- Finalist: (British Columbia) Jim Cotter
- Women's winner: (Alberta) Team Gray-Withers
- Curling club: Saville Community SC, Edmonton
- Skip: Serena Gray-Withers
- Third: Laura Walker
- Second: Kaitlyn Lawes
- Lead: Zoe Cinnamon
- Finalist: (Alberta) Selena Sturmay

The 2026 edition of the Saville Shootout will be held from September 11 to 14 at the Saville Community Sports Centre in Edmonton, Alberta. The event was held in a round robin format with a $25,000 purse on both the men's and women's sides.

== Men ==
=== Teams ===
The teams are listed as follows:

| Skip | Third | Second | Lead | Alternate | Locale |
|---|---|---|---|---|---|
| James Ballance | Michael Keenan | Garrett Johnston | Steven Leong | | Okotoks, Alberta |
| Matthew Blandford | Cameron de Jong | Sébastien Robillard | Cody Johnston | | Vancouver, British Columbia |
| Kieran Channon | Jabin Bromm | Matthew Reignier | Rhett Mailloux | | Edmonton, Alberta |
| Jim Cotter | Jared Kolomaya | Connor Deane | Erik Colwell | Brad Wood | Vernon, British Columbia |
| Zachary Davies | Glenn Venance (Note: Glenn Venance spared for Ronan Peterson.) | William Butler | Lucas Sawiak | Ronan Peterson | Edmonton, Alberta |
| Carl deConinck Smith | Ryan Deis | Dustin Mikush | Kalin Deis | | Fox Valley, Saskatchewan |
| Wouter Gösgens | Laurens Hoekman | Simon Spits | Hessel Janssens | | Zoetermeer, Netherlands |
| Matthew Hall | Sterling Middleton | Alex Horvath | Thomas Thierbach | | Victoria, British Columbia |
| Jaxon Hiebert | Noah Mason-Wood | Nate Burton | Braeden Hein | | Edmonton, Alberta |
| Peter Hlushak | Sahil Dalrymple | Tyler Derksen | Josh Lussier | | Edmonton, Alberta |
| Benjamin Kapp | Felix Messenzehl | Johannes Scheuerl | Mario Trevisiol | | Füssen, Germany |
| Kevin Koe | Johnson Tao | Aaron Sluchinski | Karrick Martin | | Calgary, Alberta |
| Mitchell Kopytko | Cam Weir | Calder Fadden | Coburn Fadden | | Kamloops, British Columbia |
| Michael Lambert | Justin Runciman | Morgan van Doesburg | Gryffen Algot | | Edmonton, Alberta |
| Jacob Libbus | Nathan Molberg | Zachary Pawliuk | Michael Hendricks | | Edmonton, Alberta |
| Carson McMullin | Daniel Laufer | Will Podhradsky | Ethan Macomber | | (United States) Eau Claire, Wisconsin |
| Ryan Parent | Jared Jenkins | Ben Savage | Derek Bowyer | | Calgary, Alberta |
| Tyler Tardi | Colton Flasch | Kevin Marsh | Daniel Marsh | | Saskatoon, Saskatchewan |
| Samuel Strouse (Fourth) | Kevin Tuma (Skip) | Coleman Thurston | Connor Kauffman | | (United States) Traverse City, Michigan |
| Evan van Amsterdam | Jeremy Harty | Jason Ginter | Parker Konschuh | | Edmonton, Alberta |

=== Round robin standings ===
Final Round Robin Standings

Key
| Teams to Playoffs |

| Pool A | W | L |
|---|---|---|
| (Saskatchewan) Tyler Tardi | 4 | 0 |
| (British Columbia) Mitchell Kopytko | 3 | 1 |
| (Alberta) Jacob Libbus | 2 | 2 |
| (British Columbia) Matthew Hall | 1 | 3 |
| (Alberta) James Ballance | 0 | 4 |

| Pool B | W | L |
|---|---|---|
| (Alberta) Evan van Amsterdam | 4 | 0 |
| (British Columbia) Jim Cotter | 3 | 1 |
| (British Columbia) Matthew Blandford | 2 | 2 |
| (Alberta) Peter Hlushak | 1 | 3 |
| (Saskatchewan) Carl deConinck Smith | 0 | 4 |

| Pool C | W | L |
|---|---|---|
| (Alberta) Kevin Koe | 3 | 1 |
| (Alberta) Zachary Davies | 3 | 1 |
| (Netherlands) Wouter Gösgens | 2 | 2 |
| (Alberta) Michael Lambert | 1 | 3 |
| (United States) Carson McMullin | 1 | 3 |

| Pool D | W | L |
|---|---|---|
| (Alberta) Jaxon Hiebert | 4 | 0 |
| (Germany) Benjamin Kapp | 3 | 1 |
| (United States) Kevin Tuma | 2 | 2 |
| (Alberta) Ryan Parent | 1 | 3 |
| (Alberta) Kieran Channon | 0 | 4 |

=== Round robin results ===
All draw times listed in Mountain Time (UTC−06:00).

==== Draw 1 ====
Friday, September 11, 9:00 am

| Sheet 1 | 1 | 2 | 3 | 4 | 5 | 6 | 7 | 8 | 9 | Final |
| (Saskatchewan) Tyler Tardi 🔨 | 2 | 0 | 0 | 0 | 2 | 0 | 1 | 0 | 1 | 6 |
| (Alberta) James Ballance | 0 | 1 | 0 | 2 | 0 | 1 | 0 | 1 | 0 | 5 |

| Sheet 2 | 1 | 2 | 3 | 4 | 5 | 6 | 7 | 8 | Final |
| (United States) Kevin Tuma | 0 | 1 | 1 | 0 | 2 | 1 | 0 | 2 | 7 |
| (Alberta) Ryan Parent 🔨 | 2 | 0 | 0 | 1 | 0 | 0 | 2 | 0 | 5 |

| Sheet 3 | 1 | 2 | 3 | 4 | 5 | 6 | 7 | 8 | Final |
| (Germany) Benjamin Kapp 🔨 | 0 | 1 | 0 | 1 | 2 | 0 | 3 | X | 7 |
| (Alberta) Kieran Channon | 0 | 0 | 1 | 0 | 0 | 2 | 0 | X | 3 |

| Sheet 4 | 1 | 2 | 3 | 4 | 5 | 6 | 7 | 8 | Final |
| (British Columbia) Matthew Hall | 0 | 1 | 0 | 0 | 2 | 0 | X | X | 3 |
| (Alberta) Jacob Libbus 🔨 | 1 | 0 | 3 | 2 | 0 | 3 | X | X | 9 |

| Sheet 5 | 1 | 2 | 3 | 4 | 5 | 6 | 7 | 8 | Final |
| (Alberta) Evan van Amsterdam | 0 | 0 | 5 | 0 | 0 | 0 | 4 | 1 | 10 |
| (British Columbia) Jim Cotter 🔨 | 1 | 1 | 0 | 2 | 1 | 2 | 0 | 0 | 7 |

| Sheet 6 | 1 | 2 | 3 | 4 | 5 | 6 | 7 | 8 | 9 | Final |
| (British Columbia) Matthew Blandford | 0 | 1 | 0 | 1 | 0 | 2 | 1 | 0 | 2 | 7 |
| (Saskatchewan) Carl deConinck Smith 🔨 | 1 | 0 | 2 | 0 | 1 | 0 | 0 | 1 | 0 | 5 |

| Sheet 7 | 1 | 2 | 3 | 4 | 5 | 6 | 7 | 8 | Final |
| (Alberta) Kevin Koe 🔨 | 5 | 1 | 0 | 0 | 1 | 2 | X | X | 9 |
| (Alberta) Michael Lambert | 0 | 0 | 1 | 0 | 0 | 0 | X | X | 1 |

| Sheet 8 | 1 | 2 | 3 | 4 | 5 | 6 | 7 | 8 | Final |
| (Netherlands) Wouter Gösgens 🔨 | 0 | 1 | 0 | 1 | 0 | 0 | 0 | X | 2 |
| (Alberta) Zachary Davies | 0 | 0 | 2 | 0 | 0 | 2 | 1 | X | 5 |

==== Draw 2 ====
Friday, September 11, 2:00 pm

| Sheet 1 | 1 | 2 | 3 | 4 | 5 | 6 | 7 | 8 | Final |
| (British Columbia) Matthew Blandford | 0 | 1 | 2 | 0 | 0 | 1 | 4 | X | 8 |
| (Alberta) Peter Hlushak 🔨 | 0 | 0 | 0 | 1 | 1 | 0 | 0 | X | 2 |

| Sheet 2 | 1 | 2 | 3 | 4 | 5 | 6 | 7 | 8 | Final |
| (British Columbia) Matthew Hall | 0 | 2 | 0 | 0 | 1 | 0 | 0 | X | 3 |
| (British Columbia) Mitchell Kopytko 🔨 | 2 | 0 | 2 | 2 | 0 | 1 | 1 | X | 8 |

==== Draw 3 ====
Friday, September 5, 7:00 pm

| Sheet 1 | 1 | 2 | 3 | 4 | 5 | 6 | 7 | 8 | 9 | Final |
| (Saskatchewan) Carl deConinck Smith 🔨 | 1 | 0 | 1 | 0 | 2 | 0 | 0 | 1 | 0 | 5 |
| (British Columbia) Jim Cotter | 0 | 1 | 0 | 2 | 0 | 1 | 1 | 0 | 2 | 7 |

| Sheet 2 | 1 | 2 | 3 | 4 | 5 | 6 | 7 | 8 | Final |
| (Alberta) Jacob Libbus 🔨 | 2 | 0 | 3 | 1 | 3 | X | X | X | 9 |
| (Alberta) James Ballance | 0 | 1 | 0 | 0 | 0 | X | X | X | 1 |

| Sheet 3 | 1 | 2 | 3 | 4 | 5 | 6 | 7 | 8 | Final |
| (Alberta) Kevin Koe | 0 | 3 | 0 | 0 | 2 | 1 | 1 | X | 7 |
| (United States) Carson McMullin 🔨 | 4 | 0 | 1 | 3 | 0 | 0 | 0 | X | 8 |

| Sheet 4 | 1 | 2 | 3 | 4 | 5 | 6 | 7 | 8 | 9 | Final |
| (Alberta) Zachary Davies | 0 | 0 | 2 | 0 | 0 | 2 | 0 | 0 | 1 | 5 |
| (Alberta) Michael Lambert 🔨 | 1 | 1 | 0 | 0 | 1 | 0 | 0 | 1 | 0 | 4 |

| Sheet 5 | 1 | 2 | 3 | 4 | 5 | 6 | 7 | 8 | Final |
| (Alberta) Ryan Parent 🔨 | 0 | 1 | 1 | 0 | 3 | 1 | X | X | 6 |
| (Alberta) Kieran Channon | 0 | 0 | 0 | 2 | 0 | 0 | X | X | 2 |

| Sheet 6 | 1 | 2 | 3 | 4 | 5 | 6 | 7 | 8 | Final |
| (Germany) Benjamin Kapp 🔨 | 1 | 1 | 0 | 1 | 0 | 1 | 0 | 0 | 4 |
| (Alberta) Jaxon Hiebert | 0 | 0 | 1 | 0 | 2 | 0 | 2 | 2 | 7 |

| Sheet 7 | 1 | 2 | 3 | 4 | 5 | 6 | 7 | 8 | Final |
| (Saskatchewan) Tyler Tardi 🔨 | 0 | 1 | 3 | 0 | 0 | 2 | 0 | 1 | 7 |
| (British Columbia) Mitchell Kopytko | 0 | 0 | 0 | 1 | 1 | 0 | 3 | 0 | 5 |

| Sheet 8 | 1 | 2 | 3 | 4 | 5 | 6 | 7 | 8 | Final |
| (Alberta) Evan van Amsterdam 🔨 | 2 | 2 | 1 | 3 | X | X | X | X | 8 |
| (Alberta) Peter Hlushak | 0 | 0 | 0 | 0 | X | X | X | X | 0 |

==== Draw 4 ====
Saturday, September 12, 9:00 am

| Sheet 1 | 1 | 2 | 3 | 4 | 5 | 6 | 7 | 8 | Final |
| (United States) Kevin Tuma | 0 | 0 | 1 | 0 | 0 | 0 | X | X | 1 |
| (Alberta) Jaxon Hiebert 🔨 | 2 | 1 | 0 | 1 | 2 | 2 | X | X | 8 |

| Sheet 2 | 1 | 2 | 3 | 4 | 5 | 6 | 7 | 8 | Final |
| (Netherlands) Wouter Gösgens 🔨 | 5 | 0 | 1 | 0 | 1 | 1 | X | X | 8 |
| (United States) Carson McMullin | 0 | 1 | 0 | 1 | 0 | 0 | X | X | 2 |

==== Draw 5 ====
Saturday, September 12, 2:00 pm

| Sheet 3 | 1 | 2 | 3 | 4 | 5 | 6 | 7 | 8 | Final |
| (Netherlands) Wouter Gösgens | 0 | 2 | 0 | 2 | 2 | 1 | 1 | X | 8 |
| (Alberta) Michael Lambert 🔨 | 3 | 0 | 1 | 0 | 0 | 0 | 0 | X | 4 |

| Sheet 4 | 1 | 2 | 3 | 4 | 5 | 6 | 7 | 8 | Final |
| (British Columbia) Matthew Hall | 0 | 0 | 0 | 1 | 1 | 3 | 0 | X | 5 |
| (Alberta) James Ballance 🔨 | 0 | 1 | 0 | 0 | 0 | 0 | 1 | X | 2 |

| Sheet 5 | 1 | 2 | 3 | 4 | 5 | 6 | 7 | 8 | Final |
| (Saskatchewan) Tyler Tardi 🔨 | 1 | 0 | 0 | 0 | 0 | 3 | 0 | 1 | 5 |
| (Alberta) Jacob Libbus | 0 | 0 | 0 | 1 | 1 | 0 | 2 | 0 | 4 |

| Sheet 6 | 1 | 2 | 3 | 4 | 5 | 6 | 7 | 8 | Final |
| (United States) Kevin Tuma 🔨 | 0 | 0 | 2 | 0 | 0 | 1 | 0 | 1 | 4 |
| (Alberta) Kieran Channon | 0 | 1 | 0 | 0 | 0 | 0 | 1 | 0 | 2 |

| Sheet 7 | 1 | 2 | 3 | 4 | 5 | 6 | 7 | 8 | Final |
| (Germany) Benjamin Kapp | 0 | 2 | 1 | 1 | 0 | 4 | X | X | 8 |
| (Alberta) Ryan Parent 🔨 | 2 | 0 | 0 | 0 | 1 | 0 | X | X | 3 |

| Sheet 8 | 1 | 2 | 3 | 4 | 5 | 6 | 7 | 8 | Final |
| (British Columbia) Matthew Blandford | 0 | 0 | 3 | 0 | X | X | X | X | 3 |
| (British Columbia) Jim Cotter 🔨 | 3 | 3 | 0 | 4 | X | X | X | X | 10 |

| Sheet 9 | 1 | 2 | 3 | 4 | 5 | 6 | 7 | 8 | Final |
| (Alberta) Evan van Amsterdam 🔨 | 2 | 3 | 0 | 0 | 3 | X | X | X | 8 |
| (Saskatchewan) Carl deConinck Smith | 0 | 0 | 0 | 1 | 0 | X | X | X | 1 |

| Sheet 10 | 1 | 2 | 3 | 4 | 5 | 6 | 7 | 8 | Final |
| (Alberta) Kevin Koe 🔨 | 0 | 0 | 0 | 2 | 0 | 0 | 4 | X | 6 |
| (Alberta) Zachary Davies | 0 | 0 | 1 | 0 | 0 | 1 | 0 | X | 2 |

==== Draw 6 ====
Saturday, September 6, 7:00 pm

| Sheet 1 | 1 | 2 | 3 | 4 | 5 | 6 | 7 | 8 | Final |
| (Alberta) Jacob Libbus | 0 | 1 | 0 | 1 | 0 | 1 | X | X | 3 |
| (British Columbia) Mitchell Kopytko 🔨 | 2 | 0 | 1 | 0 | 1 | 0 | X | X | 4 |

| Sheet 2 | 1 | 2 | 3 | 4 | 5 | 6 | 7 | 8 | Final |
| (Saskatchewan) Carl deConinck Smith 🔨 | 1 | 0 | 0 | 1 | 0 | 1 | 0 | 0 | 3 |
| (Alberta) Peter Hlushak | 0 | 2 | 0 | 0 | 1 | 0 | 3 | 2 | 8 |

==== Draw 7 ====
Sunday, September 13, 9:00 am

| Sheet 3 | 1 | 2 | 3 | 4 | 5 | 6 | 7 | 8 | Final |
| (Alberta) Evan van Amsterdam 🔨 | 0 | 2 | 0 | 2 | 0 | 2 | 0 | X | 6 |
| (British Columbia) Matthew Blandford | 1 | 0 | 1 | 0 | 1 | 0 | 1 | X | 4 |

| Sheet 4 | 1 | 2 | 3 | 4 | 5 | 6 | 7 | 8 | Final |
| (Germany) Benjamin Kapp 🔨 | 1 | 0 | 2 | 0 | 0 | 0 | 2 | X | 5 |
| (United States) Kevin Tuma | 0 | 1 | 0 | 1 | 0 | 1 | 0 | X | 3 |

| Sheet 5 | 1 | 2 | 3 | 4 | 5 | 6 | 7 | 8 | 9 | Final |
| (Alberta) Zachary Davies 🔨 | 0 | 0 | 0 | 0 | 2 | 0 | 2 | 0 | 1 | 5 |
| (United States) Carson McMullin | 0 | 1 | 0 | 1 | 0 | 1 | 0 | 1 | 0 | 4 |

| Sheet 6 | 1 | 2 | 3 | 4 | 5 | 6 | 7 | 8 | Final |
| (British Columbia) Mitchell Kopytko 🔨 | 2 | 0 | 1 | 4 | 0 | 2 | X | X | 9 |
| (Alberta) James Ballance | 0 | 1 | 0 | 0 | 1 | 0 | X | X | 2 |

| Sheet 7 | 1 | 2 | 3 | 4 | 5 | 6 | 7 | 8 | Final |
| (Alberta) Peter Hlushak 🔨 | 0 | 1 | 1 | 1 | 0 | 0 | 0 | X | 3 |
| (British Columbia) Jim Cotter | 1 | 0 | 0 | 0 | 2 | 2 | 2 | X | 7 |

| Sheet 8 | 1 | 2 | 3 | 4 | 5 | 6 | 7 | 8 | Final |
| (Saskatchewan) Tyler Tardi 🔨 | 0 | 2 | 0 | 2 | 2 | 0 | 0 | 2 | 8 |
| (British Columbia) Matthew Hall | 0 | 0 | 1 | 0 | 0 | 2 | 1 | 0 | 4 |

| Sheet 9 | 1 | 2 | 3 | 4 | 5 | 6 | 7 | 8 | Final |
| (Alberta) Kevin Koe | 0 | 1 | 0 | 2 | 0 | 2 | 0 | 1 | 6 |
| (Netherlands) Wouter Gösgens 🔨 | 1 | 0 | 1 | 0 | 1 | 0 | 2 | 0 | 5 |

| Sheet 10 | 1 | 2 | 3 | 4 | 5 | 6 | 7 | 8 | Final |
| (Alberta) Ryan Parent | 0 | 0 | 0 | 0 | 0 | X | X | X | 0 |
| (Alberta) Jaxon Hiebert 🔨 | 0 | 1 | 3 | 1 | 3 | X | X | X | 8 |

==== Draw 8 ====
Sunday, September 13, 2:00 pm

| Sheet 1 | 1 | 2 | 3 | 4 | 5 | 6 | 7 | 8 | Final |
| (United States) Carson McMullin 🔨 | 0 | 1 | 0 | 2 | 1 | 0 | 1 | 0 | 5 |
| (Alberta) Michael Lambert | 0 | 0 | 2 | 0 | 0 | 1 | 0 | 3 | 6 |

| Sheet 2 | 1 | 2 | 3 | 4 | 5 | 6 | 7 | 8 | Final |
| (Alberta) Jaxon Hiebert 🔨 | 2 | 0 | 2 | 2 | 0 | 5 | X | X | 11 |
| (Alberta) Kieran Channon | 0 | 1 | 0 | 0 | 2 | 0 | X | X | 3 |

=== Playoffs ===
Quarterfinals
1 | (Alberta) Jaxon Hiebert | 5
8 | (British Columbia) Jim Cotter | 6
4 | (Alberta) Kevin Koe | 4
5 | (British Columbia) Mitchell Kopytko | 6
2 | (Alberta) Evan van Amsterdam | 3
7 | (Alberta) Zachary Davies | 6
3 | (Saskatchewan) Tyler Tardi | 5
6 | (Germany) Benjamin Kapp | 8

Semifinals
8 | (British Columbia) Jim Cotter | 4
5 | (British Columbia) Mitchell Kopytko | 1
7 | (Alberta) Zachary Davies | 4
6 | (Germany) Benjamin Kapp | 6

Final
8 | (British Columbia) Jim Cotter | 4
6 | (Germany) Benjamin Kapp | 5

==== Quarterfinals ====
Sunday, September 13, 7:00 pm

| Sheet 2 | 1 | 2 | 3 | 4 | 5 | 6 | 7 | 8 | Final |
| (Alberta) Evan van Amsterdam 🔨 | 0 | 1 | 0 | 0 | 0 | 0 | 2 | 0 | 3 |
| (Alberta) Zachary Davies | 1 | 0 | 2 | 1 | 0 | 1 | 0 | 1 | 6 |

| Sheet 3 | 1 | 2 | 3 | 4 | 5 | 6 | 7 | 8 | Final |
| (Saskatchewan) Tyler Tardi 🔨 | 2 | 0 | 2 | 0 | 0 | 1 | 0 | 0 | 5 |
| (Germany) Benjamin Kapp | 0 | 2 | 0 | 2 | 0 | 0 | 3 | 1 | 8 |

| Sheet 4 | 1 | 2 | 3 | 4 | 5 | 6 | 7 | 8 | Final |
| (Alberta) Kevin Koe 🔨 | 2 | 0 | 0 | 1 | 1 | 0 | 0 | 0 | 4 |
| (British Columbia) Mitchell Kopytko | 0 | 0 | 1 | 0 | 0 | 2 | 2 | 1 | 6 |

| Sheet 5 | 1 | 2 | 3 | 4 | 5 | 6 | 7 | 8 | 9 | Final |
| (Alberta) Jaxon Hiebert 🔨 | 0 | 0 | 2 | 0 | 1 | 0 | 0 | 2 | 0 | 5 |
| (British Columbia) Jim Cotter | 0 | 1 | 0 | 2 | 0 | 1 | 1 | 0 | 1 | 6 |

==== Semifinals ====
Monday, September 14, 12:00 pm

| Sheet 7 | 1 | 2 | 3 | 4 | 5 | 6 | 7 | 8 | Final |
| (British Columbia) Jim Cotter 🔨 | 0 | 2 | 0 | 1 | 1 | 0 | X | X | 4 |
| (British Columbia) Mitchell Kopytko | 0 | 0 | 0 | 0 | 0 | 1 | X | X | 1 |

| Sheet 8 | 1 | 2 | 3 | 4 | 5 | 6 | 7 | 8 | Final |
| (Alberta) Zachary Davies | 0 | 0 | 2 | 0 | 1 | 0 | 1 | X | 4 |
| (Germany) Benjamin Kapp 🔨 | 0 | 2 | 0 | 2 | 0 | 2 | 0 | X | 6 |

==== Final ====
Monday, September 14, 3:30 pm

| Sheet 6 | 1 | 2 | 3 | 4 | 5 | 6 | 7 | 8 | Final |
| (British Columbia) Jim Cotter | 1 | 1 | 0 | 0 | 0 | 0 | 1 | 1 | 4 |
| (Germany) Benjamin Kapp 🔨 | 0 | 0 | 2 | 2 | 0 | 1 | 0 | 0 | 5 |

== Women ==
=== Teams ===
The teams are listed as follows:

| Skip | Third | Second | Lead | Alternate | Locale |
|---|---|---|---|---|---|
| Skylar Ackerman | Robyn Silvernagle | Rachel Big Eagle | Jessie Hunkin (Note: Jessie Hunkin spared for Mary Little.) | | Saskatoon, Saskatchewan |
| Betti Delorey | Halli-Rai Delorey | Makayla Cook | Tyanna Bain | | Hay River, Northwest Territories |
| Abby Desormeau | Sarah Yarmuch | Bethany Evans | Kieran Roa | | Edmonton, Alberta |
| Keelie Duncan | Eryn Czirfusz | Ivy Jensen | Tessa Terrick | | Winnipeg, Manitoba |
| Kerri Einarson | Shannon Birchard | Karlee Burgess | Jocelyn Peterman | | Gimli, Manitoba |
| Kim Min-ji (Fourth) | Gim Eun-ji (Skip) | Kim Su-ji | Seol Ye-ji (Note: Alternate Seol Ye-ji played lead, replacing Seol Ye-eun.) | Seol Ye-eun | Uijeongbu, South Korea |
| Serena Gray-Withers | Laura Walker (Note: Catherine Clifford missed the tournament, with Laura Walker moving to third, and Kaitlyn Lawes sparing for Team Gray-Withers as second.) | Kaitlyn Lawes | Zoe Cinnamon | | Edmonton, Alberta |
| Ava Koe | Abby Whitbread | Elizabeth Morgan | Carley Hardie | | Calgary, Alberta |
| Rebecca Mariani | Giada Zambelli | Letizia Carlisano | Camilla Gilberti | | Brunico, Italy |
| Miku Nihira | Momoha Tabata | Sae Yamamoto | Mikoto Nakajima | | Sapporo, Japan |
| Chelsea Carey (Note: Chelsea Carey spared for Selena Njegovan and skipped Team Njegovan.) | Erin Pincott | Margot Flemming | Krysten Karwacki | | Winnipeg, Manitoba |
| Hannah Phillips | Payton Sonnenberg | Hailey Dupras | Meghan Chateauvert | | Drayton Valley, Alberta |
| Taylor Reese-Hansen | Megan McGillivray | Kim Bonneau | Julianna Mackenzie | | Victoria, British Columbia |
| Gracelyn Richards | Emma Yarmuch | Rachel Jacques | Sophia Ryhorchuk | | Edmonton, Alberta |
| Hillary Selkirk | Joelle Trawick | Sophie Gallant | Chloe McGuirk | | Calgary, Alberta |
| Selena Sturmay | Danielle Schmiemann | Dezaray Hawes | Paige Papley | | Edmonton, Alberta |

=== Round robin standings ===
Final Round Robin Standings

Key
| Teams to Playoffs |

| Pool A | W | L |
|---|---|---|
| (South Korea) Gim Eun-ji | 3 | 1 |
| (Alberta) Abby Desormeau | 3 | 1 |
| (Alberta) Gracelyn Richards | 2 | 2 |
| (Northwest Territories) Betti Delorey | 0 | 4 |

| Pool B | W | L |
|---|---|---|
| (British Columbia) Taylor Reese-Hansen | 4 | 0 |
| (Alberta) Serena Gray-Withers | 2 | 2 |
| (Manitoba) Keelie Duncan | 1 | 3 |
| (Alberta) Hannah Phillips | 1 | 3 |

| Pool C | W | L |
|---|---|---|
| (Manitoba) Kerri Einarson | 3 | 1 |
| (Saskatchewan) Skylar Ackerman | 2 | 2 |
| (Manitoba) Team Njegovan | 2 | 2 |
| (Alberta) Hillary Selkirk | 0 | 4 |

| Pool D | W | L |
|---|---|---|
| (Alberta) Selena Sturmay | 4 | 0 |
| (Japan) Miku Nihira | 2 | 2 |
| (Italy) Rebecca Mariani | 2 | 2 |
| (Alberta) Ava Koe | 1 | 3 |

=== Round robin results ===
All draw times listed in Mountain Time (UTC−06:00).

==== Draw 2 ====
Friday, September 11, 2:00 pm

| Sheet 3 | 1 | 2 | 3 | 4 | 5 | 6 | 7 | 8 | Final |
| (Manitoba) Kerri Einarson 🔨 | 3 | 2 | 2 | 3 | X | X | X | X | 10 |
| (Italy) Rebecca Mariani | 0 | 0 | 0 | 0 | X | X | X | X | 0 |

| Sheet 4 | 1 | 2 | 3 | 4 | 5 | 6 | 7 | 8 | Final |
| (Manitoba) Team Njegovan 🔨 | 1 | 2 | 0 | 1 | 0 | 1 | 2 | X | 7 |
| (Alberta) Ava Koe | 0 | 0 | 1 | 0 | 1 | 0 | 0 | X | 2 |

| Sheet 5 | 1 | 2 | 3 | 4 | 5 | 6 | 7 | 8 | Final |
| (Japan) Miku Nihira 🔨 | 3 | 0 | 1 | 2 | 0 | 3 | X | X | 9 |
| (Alberta) Hillary Selkirk | 0 | 1 | 0 | 0 | 1 | 0 | X | X | 2 |

| Sheet 6 | 1 | 2 | 3 | 4 | 5 | 6 | 7 | 8 | Final |
| (Alberta) Selena Sturmay 🔨 | 1 | 0 | 0 | 2 | 0 | 0 | 3 | X | 6 |
| (Saskatchewan) Skylar Ackerman | 0 | 1 | 1 | 0 | 1 | 0 | 0 | X | 3 |

| Sheet 7 | 1 | 2 | 3 | 4 | 5 | 6 | 7 | 8 | Final |
| (South Korea) Gim Eun-ji 🔨 | 2 | 2 | 0 | 2 | 0 | 1 | X | X | 7 |
| (Alberta) Hannah Phillips | 0 | 0 | 1 | 0 | 1 | 0 | X | X | 2 |

| Sheet 8 | 1 | 2 | 3 | 4 | 5 | 6 | 7 | 8 | Final |
| (Alberta) Gracelyn Richards 🔨 | 2 | 0 | 0 | 2 | 0 | 1 | 2 | X | 7 |
| (Manitoba) Keelie Duncan | 0 | 0 | 1 | 0 | 1 | 0 | 0 | X | 2 |

| Sheet 9 | 1 | 2 | 3 | 4 | 5 | 6 | 7 | 8 | Final |
| (British Columbia) Taylor Reese-Hansen 🔨 | 1 | 2 | 2 | 3 | 3 | X | X | X | 11 |
| (Northwest Territories) Betti Delorey | 0 | 0 | 0 | 0 | 0 | X | X | X | 0 |

| Sheet 10 | 1 | 2 | 3 | 4 | 5 | 6 | 7 | 8 | 9 | Final |
| (Alberta) Serena Gray-Withers 🔨 | 0 | 1 | 2 | 0 | 0 | 0 | 1 | 0 | 0 | 4 |
| (Alberta) Abby Desormeau | 1 | 0 | 0 | 0 | 1 | 1 | 0 | 1 | 1 | 5 |

==== Draw 4 ====
Saturday, September 12, 9:00 am

| Sheet 3 | 1 | 2 | 3 | 4 | 5 | 6 | 7 | 8 | Final |
| (South Korea) Gim Eun-ji 🔨 | 3 | 0 | 0 | 3 | 1 | 0 | 0 | 0 | 7 |
| (Manitoba) Keelie Duncan | 0 | 2 | 1 | 0 | 0 | 2 | 0 | 1 | 6 |

| Sheet 4 | 1 | 2 | 3 | 4 | 5 | 6 | 7 | 8 | Final |
| (Alberta) Gracelyn Richards | 0 | 2 | 2 | 1 | 0 | 5 | X | X | 10 |
| (Alberta) Hannah Phillips 🔨 | 2 | 0 | 0 | 0 | 2 | 0 | X | X | 4 |

| Sheet 5 | 1 | 2 | 3 | 4 | 5 | 6 | 7 | 8 | Final |
| (British Columbia) Taylor Reese-Hansen 🔨 | 1 | 0 | 2 | 0 | 1 | 2 | 1 | X | 7 |
| (Alberta) Abby Desormeau | 0 | 1 | 0 | 2 | 0 | 0 | 0 | X | 3 |

| Sheet 6 | 1 | 2 | 3 | 4 | 5 | 6 | 7 | 8 | Final |
| (Alberta) Serena Gray-Withers 🔨 | 3 | 2 | 5 | 2 | X | X | X | X | 12 |
| (Northwest Territories) Betti Delorey | 0 | 0 | 0 | 0 | X | X | X | X | 0 |

| Sheet 7 | 1 | 2 | 3 | 4 | 5 | 6 | 7 | 8 | Final |
| (Manitoba) Kerri Einarson 🔨 | 2 | 0 | 0 | 1 | 0 | 0 | 1 | 1 | 5 |
| (Alberta) Ava Koe | 0 | 1 | 0 | 0 | 1 | 1 | 0 | 0 | 3 |

| Sheet 8 | 1 | 2 | 3 | 4 | 5 | 6 | 7 | 8 | Final |
| (Manitoba) Team Njegovan 🔨 | 2 | 0 | 0 | 1 | 0 | 0 | X | X | 3 |
| (Italy) Rebecca Mariani | 0 | 2 | 3 | 0 | 2 | 4 | X | X | 11 |

| Sheet 9 | 1 | 2 | 3 | 4 | 5 | 6 | 7 | 8 | Final |
| (Japan) Miku Nihira 🔨 | 2 | 0 | 0 | 2 | 2 | 1 | X | X | 7 |
| (Saskatchewan) Skylar Ackerman | 0 | 1 | 1 | 0 | 0 | 0 | X | X | 2 |

| Sheet 10 | 1 | 2 | 3 | 4 | 5 | 6 | 7 | 8 | Final |
| (Alberta) Selena Sturmay 🔨 | 2 | 1 | 0 | 2 | 1 | 0 | 0 | X | 6 |
| (Alberta) Hillary Selkirk | 0 | 0 | 1 | 0 | 0 | 1 | 1 | X | 3 |

==== Draw 6 ====
Saturday, September 12, 7:00 pm

| Sheet 3 | 1 | 2 | 3 | 4 | 5 | 6 | 7 | 8 | Final |
| (Alberta) Ava Koe | 0 | 1 | 0 | 1 | 1 | 0 | 2 | 2 | 7 |
| (Alberta) Hillary Selkirk 🔨 | 1 | 0 | 1 | 0 | 0 | 2 | 0 | 0 | 4 |

| Sheet 4 | 1 | 2 | 3 | 4 | 5 | 6 | 7 | 8 | Final |
| (Saskatchewan) Skylar Ackerman | 0 | 0 | 3 | 0 | 2 | 0 | 2 | X | 7 |
| (Italy) Rebecca Mariani 🔨 | 0 | 0 | 0 | 2 | 0 | 2 | 0 | X | 4 |

| Sheet 5 | 1 | 2 | 3 | 4 | 5 | 6 | 7 | 8 | Final |
| (Manitoba) Kerri Einarson | 0 | 0 | 2 | 0 | 1 | 0 | X | X | 3 |
| (Alberta) Selena Sturmay 🔨 | 0 | 4 | 0 | 2 | 0 | 2 | X | X | 8 |

| Sheet 6 | 1 | 2 | 3 | 4 | 5 | 6 | 7 | 8 | Final |
| (Japan) Miku Nihira | 0 | 0 | 1 | 2 | 0 | 0 | 0 | X | 3 |
| (Manitoba) Team Njegovan 🔨 | 1 | 1 | 0 | 0 | 1 | 2 | 2 | X | 7 |

| Sheet 7 | 1 | 2 | 3 | 4 | 5 | 6 | 7 | 8 | Final |
| (Manitoba) Keelie Duncan | 2 | 1 | 0 | 3 | 1 | 3 | 5 | X | 15 |
| (Northwest Territories) Betti Delorey 🔨 | 0 | 0 | 4 | 0 | 0 | 0 | 0 | X | 4 |

| Sheet 8 | 1 | 2 | 3 | 4 | 5 | 6 | 7 | 8 | Final |
| (Alberta) Abby Desormeau 🔨 | 3 | 0 | 0 | 0 | 3 | 0 | 0 | 2 | 8 |
| (Alberta) Hannah Phillips | 0 | 0 | 0 | 1 | 0 | 3 | 1 | 0 | 5 |

| Sheet 9 | 1 | 2 | 3 | 4 | 5 | 6 | 7 | 8 | Final |
| (South Korea) Gim Eun-ji 🔨 | 0 | 4 | 1 | 0 | 0 | 2 | 1 | X | 8 |
| (Alberta) Serena Gray-Withers | 1 | 0 | 0 | 1 | 1 | 0 | 0 | X | 3 |

| Sheet 10 | 1 | 2 | 3 | 4 | 5 | 6 | 7 | 8 | 9 | Final |
| (British Columbia) Taylor Reese-Hansen | 0 | 0 | 2 | 0 | 5 | 1 | 0 | 0 | 1 | 9 |
| (Alberta) Gracelyn Richards 🔨 | 0 | 3 | 0 | 2 | 0 | 0 | 2 | 1 | 0 | 8 |

==== Draw 8 ====
Sunday, September 13, 2:00 pm

| Sheet 3 | 1 | 2 | 3 | 4 | 5 | 6 | 7 | 8 | 9 | Final |
| (Alberta) Serena Gray-Withers 🔨 | 0 | 1 | 0 | 0 | 2 | 0 | 2 | 0 | 3 | 8 |
| (Alberta) Gracelyn Richards | 0 | 0 | 1 | 0 | 0 | 3 | 0 | 1 | 0 | 5 |

| Sheet 4 | 1 | 2 | 3 | 4 | 5 | 6 | 7 | 8 | Final |
| (South Korea) Gim Eun-ji | 0 | 0 | 1 | 0 | 0 | 1 | 2 | 0 | 4 |
| (British Columbia) Taylor Reese-Hansen 🔨 | 0 | 1 | 0 | 2 | 3 | 0 | 0 | 1 | 7 |

| Sheet 5 | 1 | 2 | 3 | 4 | 5 | 6 | 7 | 8 | Final |
| (Alberta) Hannah Phillips 🔨 | 0 | 0 | 4 | 0 | 1 | 2 | X | X | 7 |
| (Northwest Territories) Betti Delorey | 2 | 0 | 0 | 1 | 0 | 0 | X | X | 3 |

| Sheet 6 | 1 | 2 | 3 | 4 | 5 | 6 | 7 | 8 | Final |
| (Alberta) Abby Desormeau 🔨 | 1 | 2 | 0 | 0 | 1 | 0 | 0 | 4 | 8 |
| (Manitoba) Keelie Duncan | 0 | 0 | 1 | 0 | 0 | 1 | 2 | 0 | 4 |

| Sheet 7 | 1 | 2 | 3 | 4 | 5 | 6 | 7 | 8 | Final |
| (Alberta) Selena Sturmay | 0 | 1 | 0 | 1 | 0 | 0 | 0 | 3 | 5 |
| (Manitoba) Team Njegovan 🔨 | 1 | 0 | 1 | 0 | 0 | 1 | 1 | 0 | 4 |

| Sheet 8 | 1 | 2 | 3 | 4 | 5 | 6 | 7 | 8 | Final |
| (Manitoba) Kerri Einarson | 3 | 0 | 2 | 1 | 0 | 3 | X | X | 9 |
| (Japan) Miku Nihira 🔨 | 0 | 3 | 0 | 0 | 1 | 0 | X | X | 4 |

| Sheet 9 | 1 | 2 | 3 | 4 | 5 | 6 | 7 | 8 | 9 | Final |
| (Italy) Rebecca Mariani | 0 | 1 | 0 | 1 | 2 | 1 | 0 | 0 | 1 | 6 |
| (Alberta) Hillary Selkirk 🔨 | 1 | 0 | 2 | 0 | 0 | 0 | 1 | 1 | 0 | 5 |

| Sheet 10 | 1 | 2 | 3 | 4 | 5 | 6 | 7 | 8 | Final |
| (Saskatchewan) Skylar Ackerman 🔨 | 1 | 2 | 0 | 0 | 0 | 1 | 0 | 1 | 5 |
| (Alberta) Ava Koe | 0 | 0 | 1 | 1 | 1 | 0 | 1 | 0 | 4 |

=== Playoffs ===
Quarterfinals
1 | (Alberta) Selena Sturmay | 6
8 | (Japan) Miku Nihira | 3
4 | (South Korea) Gim Eun-ji | 7
5 | (Alberta) Abby Desormeau | 3
2 | (British Columbia) Taylor Reese-Hansen | 8
7 | (Saskatchewan) Skylar Ackerman | 4
3 | (Manitoba) Kerri Einarson | 5
6 | (Alberta) Serena Gray-Withers | 6

Semifinals
1 | (Alberta) Selena Sturmay | 5
4 | (South Korea) Gim Eun-ji | 4
2 | (British Columbia) Taylor Reese-Hansen | 5
6 | (Alberta) Serena Gray-Withers | 6

Final
1 | (Alberta) Selena Sturmay | 5
6 | (Alberta) Serena Gray-Withers | 6

==== Quarterfinals ====
Sunday, September 13, 7:00 pm

| Sheet 6 | 1 | 2 | 3 | 4 | 5 | 6 | 7 | 8 | Final |
| (Manitoba) Kerri Einarson 🔨 | 1 | 0 | 0 | 0 | 2 | 0 | 2 | 0 | 5 |
| (Alberta) Serena Gray-Withers | 0 | 1 | 0 | 1 | 0 | 1 | 0 | 3 | 6 |

| Sheet 7 | 1 | 2 | 3 | 4 | 5 | 6 | 7 | 8 | Final |
| (South Korea) Gim Eun-ji 🔨 | 0 | 1 | 1 | 1 | 1 | 0 | 3 | X | 7 |
| (Alberta) Abby Desormeau | 2 | 0 | 0 | 0 | 0 | 1 | 0 | X | 3 |

| Sheet 8 | 1 | 2 | 3 | 4 | 5 | 6 | 7 | 8 | Final |
| (British Columbia) Taylor Reese-Hansen 🔨 | 1 | 0 | 0 | 2 | 0 | 0 | 5 | X | 8 |
| (Saskatchewan) Skylar Ackerman | 0 | 1 | 1 | 0 | 1 | 1 | 0 | X | 4 |

| Sheet 9 | 1 | 2 | 3 | 4 | 5 | 6 | 7 | 8 | Final |
| (Alberta) Selena Sturmay 🔨 | 0 | 2 | 0 | 0 | 0 | 2 | 2 | X | 6 |
| (Japan) Miku Nihira | 0 | 0 | 2 | 1 | 0 | 0 | 0 | X | 3 |

==== Semifinals ====
Monday, September 14, 12:00 pm

| Sheet 3 | 1 | 2 | 3 | 4 | 5 | 6 | 7 | 8 | Final |
| (Alberta) Selena Sturmay 🔨 | 2 | 0 | 0 | 1 | 0 | 1 | 0 | 1 | 5 |
| (South Korea) Gim Eun-ji | 0 | 2 | 0 | 0 | 1 | 0 | 1 | 0 | 4 |

| Sheet 4 | 1 | 2 | 3 | 4 | 5 | 6 | 7 | 8 | Final |
| (British Columbia) Taylor Reese-Hansen 🔨 | 0 | 2 | 0 | 0 | 0 | 2 | 1 | X | 5 |
| (Alberta) Serena Gray-Withers | 1 | 0 | 2 | 1 | 2 | 0 | 0 | X | 6 |

==== Final ====
Monday, September 14, 3:30 pm

| Sheet 5 | 1 | 2 | 3 | 4 | 5 | 6 | 7 | 8 | 9 | Final |
| (Alberta) Selena Sturmay 🔨 | 2 | 0 | 0 | 1 | 1 | 0 | 1 | 0 | 0 | 5 |
| (Alberta) Serena Gray-Withers | 0 | 1 | 1 | 0 | 0 | 2 | 0 | 1 | 1 | 6 |
