= 2012 The Shoot-Out =

- Host city: Edmonton, Alberta
- Arena: Saville Sports Centre
- Dates: September 13–16
- Men's winner: (Alberta) Jamie King
- Curling club: Saville Sports Centre
- Skip: Blake MacDonald
- Fourth: Jamie King
- Second: Scott Pfeifer
- Lead: Jeff Erickson
- Finalist: (Alberta) Charley Thomas
- Women's winner: (Manitoba) Team Jennifer Jones
- Curling club: St. Vital Curling Club, Winnipeg
- Skip: Kaitlyn Lawes
- Third: Kirsten Wall
- Second: Jill Officer
- Lead: Dawn Askin
- Finalist: (Alberta) Crystal Webster

The 2012 Shoot-Out is an annual curling bonspiel that was held from September 13-16, 2012 at the Saville Sports Centre in Edmonton, Alberta as part of the 2012–13 World Curling Tour. The purses for the men's and women's events were CAD$22,000 and CAD$26,000, respectively, with the winners receiving $5,000.

Teams Jamie King and Kaitlyn Lawes won their respective events.

The women's event in particular, attracted a lot of strong teams, including former World Champion Kelly Scott, defending Canadian champion Heather Nedohin, 2010 Olympic silver medallist Cheryl Bernard, four-time Alberta champion Shannon Kleibrink and defending World senior champion, Cathy King – all of whom failed to qualify for the playoffs. The event also included former Canadian champion Amber Holland, and team Jennifer Jones, who was skipped by Kaitlyn Lawes due to Jones being pregnant. The team brought in Kirsten Wall to play third with Lawes moving up. Organizers stated that the event had attraceted the strongest women's field ever for the Shoot-Out.

The men's event did not attract as many top teams, as it was overshaddowed by the 2012 AMJ Campbell Shorty Jenkins Classic being played in Ontario. But, it did feature Team David Nedohin who had formed his own rink after the retirement of his former skip, Randy Ferbey. The event also featured two-time World Junior champion Charley Thomas, and defending World Junior champion Brendan Bottcher.

The event featured two non-Canadian teams, Anna Sidorova of Russia on the women's side and Yusuke Morozumi of Japan in the men's event. Because the Saville Centre is Canada's national curling training centre, the event organizers did not attempt to attract foreign competition.

In total, the event featured 32 women's teams playing a triple-knockout format, and 20 men's team split into four pools, with both events featuring a playoff.

Team King (with Blake MacDonald skipping) easily won the men's event, defeating Charley Thomas in the final, 8–1. The team only lost one game in the event, against Nedohin. MacDonald had come out of retirement to join the team for the season, while the team's second Scott Pfeifer had returned from a two-year break from the sport.

Kaitlyn Lawes, skipping the Jennifer Jones rink, won the women's event, defeating Crystal Webster of Calgary in the final, 6–2. The rink finished the event with an 8–2 record.

== Men ==
=== Teams ===
Skip	Third	Second	Lead	Locale
Tom Appelman	Brent Bawel	Ted Appelman	Brendan Melnyk	Edmonton, Alberta
Matthew Blandford	Evan Asmussen	Brent Hamilton	Brad Chyz	Calgary, Alberta
Brendan Bottcher	Micky Lizmore	Bradley Thiessen	Karrick Martin	Edmonton, Alberta
Glen Kennedy	Nathan Connolly	Brandon Klassen	Parker Konschuh	Edmonton, Alberta
Jamie King	Blake MacDonald	Scott Pfeifer	Jeff Erickson	Edmonton, Alberta
Steve Laycock	Kirk Muyres	Colton Flasch	Dallan Muyres	Saskatoon, Saskatchewan
Sean Morris (fourth)	Mike Libbus (skip)	Brad MacInnis	Peter Keenan	Calgary, Alberta
Rick McKague	Jim Moats	Doug McNish	Paul Strandlund	Edmonton, Alberta
Yusuke Morozumi	Tsuyoshi Yamaguchi	Tetsuro Shimizu	Kosuke Morozumi	Karuizawa, Japan
Darren Moulding	Scott Cruickshank	Shaun Planaden	Kyle Iverson	Calgary, Alberta
David Nedohin	Colin Hodgson	Tom Sallows	Mike Westlund	Edmonton, Alberta
Kevin Park	Shane Park	Josh Burns	Eric Richard	Edmonton, Alberta
Dan Petryk (fourth)	Steve Petryk (skip)	Rollie Robinson	Thomas Usselman	Calgary, Alberta
Robert Schlender	Dean Ross	Don Bartlett	Chris Lemishka	Edmonton, Alberta
Thomas Scoffin	Dylan Gousseau	Landon Bucholz	Bryce Bucholz	Edmonton, Alberta
Charley Thomas	J. D. Lind	Dominic Daemen	Matthew Ng	Calgary, Alberta
Brock Virtue	Braeden Moskowy	Chris Schille	D. J. Kidby	Regina, Saskatchewan
Wade White	Kevin Tym	Dan Holowaychuk	George White	Edmonton, Alberta
Jeremy Hodges (fourth)	Matt Willerton (skip)	Craig MacAlpine	Chris Evernden	Edmonton, Alberta
Kevin Yablonski	Vance Elder	Harrison Boss	Matthew McDonald	Calgary, Alberta

=== Round-robin standings ===
Blue Pool	W	L
(Alberta) Kevin Park	4	0
(Alberta) Charley Thomas	3	1
(Alberta) Brendan Bottcher	2	2
(Alberta) Rick McKague	1	3
(Alberta) Matthew Blandford	0	4

Green Pool	W	L
(Alberta) Glen Kennedy	4	0
(Alberta) Darren Moulding	2	2
(Saskatchewan) Brock Virtue	2	2
(Alberta) Tom Appelman	1	3
(Japan) Yusuke Morozumi	1	3

Gold Pool	W	L
(Alberta) Wade White	4	0
(Alberta) Steve Petryk	3	1
(Alberta) Kevin Yablonski	2	2
(Saskatchewan) Steve Laycock	1	3
(Alberta) Mike Libbus	0	4

Black Pool	W	L
(Alberta) David Nedohin	3	1
(Alberta) Jamie King	3	1
(Alberta) Robert Schlender	2	2
(Alberta) Thomas Scoffin	2	2
(Alberta) Matt Willerton	0	4

=== Playoffs ===
Quarterfinals
(Alberta) Wade White	4
(Alberta) Darren Moulding	5
(Alberta) Steve Petryk	0
(Alberta) Charley Thomas	8
(Alberta) Kevin Park	4
(Alberta) Jamie King	6
(Alberta) Glen Kennedy	6
(Alberta) David Nedohin	3

Semifinals
(Alberta) Darren Moulding	6
(Alberta) Charley Thomas	7
(Alberta) Jamie King	7
(Alberta) Glen Kennedy	3

Final
(Alberta) Charley Thomas	1
(Alberta) Jamie King	6

== Women ==
=== Teams ===
Skip	Third	Second	Lead	Locale
Brett Barber	Robyn Silvernagle	Kailena Bay	Dayna Demmans	Regina, Saskatchewan
Cheryl Bernard	Susan O'Connor	Lori Olson-Johns	Shannon Aleksic	Calgary, Alberta
Chelsea Carey	Kristy McDonald	Kristen Foster	Lindsay Titheridge	Morden, Manitoba
Laura Crocker	Sarah Wilkes	Rebecca Pattison	Jen Gates	Edmonton, Alberta
Tanilla Doyle	Joelle Horn	Lindsay Amundsen-Meyer	Christina Faulkner	Edmonton, Alberta
Lisa Eyamie	Maria Bushell	Jodi Marthaller	Valerie Hamende	Calgary, Alberta
Amber Holland	Jolene Campbell	Brooklyn Lemon	Dailene Sivertson	Regina, Saskatchewan
Shana Snell (fourth)	Heather Jensen (skip)	Heather Rogers	Carly Quigley	Edmonton, Alberta
Lisa Johnson	Michelle Ries	Natalie Holloway	Shauna Nordstrom	Edmonton, Alberta
Jessie Kaufman	Nicky Kaufman	Kelly Erickson	Stephanie Enright	Edmonton, Alberta
Cathy King	Carolyn Morris	Lesley McEwan	Doreen Gares	Edmonton, Alberta
Kaitlyn Lawes	Kirsten Wall	Jill Officer	Dawn Askin	Winnipeg, Manitoba
Stefanie Lawton	Sherry Anderson	Sherri Singler	Marliese Kasner	Saskatoon, Saskatchewan
Lindsay Makichuk	Amy Janko	Jessica Monk	Kristina Hadden	Edmonton, Alberta
Chana Martineau	Pam Appleman	Brittany Zelmer	Jennifer Sheehan	Edmonton, Alberta
Kristie Moore	Blaine Richards	Michelle Dykstra	Amber Cheveldave	Grande Prairie, Alberta
Heather Nedohin	Beth Iskiw	Jessica Mair	Laine Peters	Edmonton, Alberta
Amy Nixon	Nadine Chyz	Whitney Eckstrand	Tracy Bush	Calgary/Red Deer, Alberta
Tiffany Odegard	Vanessa Pouliot	Jennifer Van Wieren	Melissa Pierce	Edmonton, Alberta
Cathy Overton-Clapham	Jenna Loder	Ashley Howard	Breanne Meakin	Winnipeg, Manitoba
Darcy Robertson	Tracey Lavery	Venessa Foster	Michelle Kruk	Winnipeg, Manitoba
Leslie Rogers	Suzanne Walker	Jenilee Goertzen	Kelsey Latawiec	Edmonton, Alberta
Jennifer Schab	Sheri Pickering	Jody Kiem	Heather Hansen	Calgary, Alberta
Casey Scheidegger	Michele Smith	Jessie Scheidegger	Kimberly Anderson	Lethbridge, Alberta
Kelly Scott	Jeanna Schraeder	Kerri Einarson*	Sarah Wazney	Kelowna, British Columbia
Anna Sidorova	Liudmilla Privivkova	Margarita Fomina	Ekaterina Galkina	Moscow, Russia
Renée Sonnenberg	Lawnie MacDonald	Cary-Anne Sallows	Rona Pasika	Edmonton, Alberta
Tiffany Steuber	Megan Anderson	Lisa Miller	Cindy Westgard	Edmonton, Alberta
Valerie Sweeting	Dana Ferguson	Joanne Taylor	Rachelle Pidherny	Edmonton, Alberta
Crystal Webster	Erin Carmody	Geri-Lynn Ramsay	Samantha Preston	Calgary, Alberta
Holly Whyte	Heather Steele	Cori Dunbar	Jamie Forth	Edmonton, Alberta

* Kerri Einarson is filling in for Sasha Carter

=== Knockout Brackets ===
==== A Event ====
First Knockout
(Manitoba) Kaitlyn Lawes	6
(Alberta) Heather Jensen	5
(Saskatchewan) Amber Holland	5
(Manitoba) Darcy Robertson	4
(Alberta) Renée Sonnenberg	6
(Alberta) Lisa Johnson	0
(Alberta) Cheryl Bernard	4
(Alberta) Tanilla Doyle	5
(Manitoba) Chelsea Carey	7
(Alberta) Holly Whyte	3
(British Columbia) Kelly Scott	2
(Alberta) Lisa Eyamie	4
(Alberta) Laura Crocker	6
(Alberta) Kristie Moore	4
(Saskatchewan) Stefanie Lawton	8
(Alberta) Jennifer Schab	5

Quarterfinals
(Manitoba) Kaitlyn Lawes	6
(Saskatchewan) Amber Holland	5
(Alberta) Renée Sonnenberg	11
(Alberta) Tanilla Doyle	5
(Manitoba) Chelsea Carey	6
(Alberta) Lisa Eyamie	1
(Alberta) Laura Crocker	2
(Saskatchewan) Stefanie Lawton	4

Semifinals
(Manitoba) Kaitlyn Lawes	7
(Alberta) Renée Sonnenberg	2
(Manitoba) Chelsea Carey	10
(Saskatchewan) Stefanie Lawton	1

Qualifier 1
(Manitoba) Kaitlyn Lawes	3
(Manitoba) Chelsea Carey	7

First Knockout
(Alberta) Heather Nedohin	8
(Alberta) Chana Martineau	0
(Alberta) Amy Nixon	5
(Alberta) Leslie Rogers	3
(Alberta) Shannon Kleibrink	11
(Alberta) Lindsay Makichuk	3
(Russia) Anna Sidorova	6
(Alberta) Tiffany Odegard	5
(Alberta) Crystal Webster	6
(Saskatchewan) Brett Barber	5
(Alberta) Valerie Sweeting	5
(Alberta) Casey Scheidegger	3
(Alberta) Jessie Kaufman	6
(Alberta) Tiffany Steuber	4
(Manitoba) Cathy Overton-Clapham	4
(Alberta) Cathy King	7

Quarterfinals
(Alberta) Heather Nedohin	7
(Alberta) Amy Nixon	2
(Alberta) Shannon Kleibrink	2
(Russia) Anna Sidorova	5
(Alberta) Crystal Webster	9
(Alberta) Valerie Sweeting	1
(Alberta) Jessie Kaufman	6
(Alberta) Cathy King	3

Semifinals
(Alberta) Heather Nedohin	6
(Russia) Anna Sidorova	3
(Alberta) Crystal Webster	5
(Alberta) Jessie Kaufman	4

Qualifier 2
(Alberta) Heather Nedohin	4
(Alberta) Crystal Webster	6

==== B Event ====
Second Knockout
(Alberta) Heather Jensen	3
(Manitoba) Darcy Robertson	5
(Alberta) Cheryl Bernard	6
(Alberta) Lisa Johnson	1

Quarterfinals
(Alberta) Cathy King	3
(Manitoba) Darcy Robertson	6
(Alberta) Valerie Sweeting	4
(Alberta) Cheryl Bernard	2

Semifinals
(Russia) Anna Sidorova	4
(Manitoba) Darcy Robertson	6
(Saskatchewan) Stefanie Lawton	6
(Alberta) Valerie Sweeting	3

To Qualifier 3
(Manitoba) Darcy Robertson	2
(Saskatchewan) Stefanie Lawton	6

Second Knockout
(Alberta) Holly Whyte	2
(British Columbia) Kelly Scott	6
(Alberta) Kristie Moore	10
(Alberta) Jennifer Schab	3

Quarterfinals
(Alberta) Shannon Kleibrink	8
(British Columbia) Kelly Scott	5
(Alberta) Amy Nixon	6
(Alberta) Kristie Moore	5

Semifinals
(Alberta) Shannon Kleibrink	5
(Alberta) Amy Nixon	8

To Qualifier 3
(Manitoba) Kaitlyn Lawes	8
(Alberta) Amy Nixon	5
Qualifier 3
(Saskatchewan) Stefanie Lawton	5
(Manitoba) Kaitlyn Lawes	3

Second Knockout
(Alberta) Chana Martineau	6
(Alberta) Leslie Rogers	8
(Alberta) Lindsay Makichuk	8
(Alberta) Tiffany Odegard	7

Quarterfinals
(Alberta) Laura Crocker	5
(Alberta) Leslie Rogers	3
(Alberta) Lisa Eyamie	6
(Alberta) Lindsay Makichuk	4

Semifinals
(Alberta) Jessie Kaufman	4
(Alberta) Laura Crocker	6
(Alberta) Renée Sonnenberg	6
(Alberta) Lisa Eyamie	5

To Qualifier 4
(Alberta) Laura Crocker	2
(Alberta) Renée Sonnenberg	5

Second Knockout
(Saskatchewan) Brett Barber	3
(Alberta) Casey Scheidegger	8
(Alberta) Tiffany Steuber	4
(Manitoba) Cathy Overton-Clapham	7

Quarterfinals
(Alberta) Tanilla Doyle	0
(Alberta) Casey Scheidegger	6
(Saskatchewan) Amber Holland	6
(Manitoba) Cathy Overton-Clapham	5

Semifinals
(Alberta) Casey Scheidegger	2
(Saskatchewan) Amber Holland	6

To Qualifier 4
(Alberta) Heather Nedohin	4
(Saskatchewan) Amber Holland	7
Qualifier 4
(Alberta) Renée Sonnenberg	2
(Saskatchewan) Amber Holland	5

==== C Event ====
Third Knockout
(Alberta) Heather Jensen	5
(Alberta) Lisa Johnson	6
(Alberta) Holly Whyte	8
(Alberta) Jennifer Schab	3

Quarterfinals
(Alberta) Jessie Kaufman	7
(Alberta) Lisa Johnson	4
(Alberta) Lisa Eyamie	4
(Alberta) Holly Whyte	2

Semifinals
(Alberta) Jessie Kaufman	5
(Alberta) Lisa Eyamie	6

Qualifier 5
(Alberta) Lisa Eyamie	1
(Manitoba) Kaitlyn Lawes	7

Third Knockout
(British Columbia) Kelly Scott	8
(Alberta) Kristie Moore	4

Quarterfinals
(Alberta) Cathy King	5
(Alberta) Cheryl Bernard	7
(Alberta) Casey Scheidegger	6
(British Columbia) Kelly Scott	4

Semifinals
(Alberta) Cheryl Bernard	7
(Alberta) Heather Nedohin	5
(Alberta) Casey Scheidegger	8
(Alberta) Laura Crocker	7

Qualifier 6
(Alberta) Cheryl Bernard	3
(Alberta) Casey Scheidegger	5

Third Knockout
(Alberta) Tanilla Doyle	1
(Manitoba) Cathy Overton-Clapham	7

Quarterfinals
(Alberta) Shannon Kleibrink	4
(Manitoba) Cathy Overton-Clapham	6
(Alberta) Leslie Rogers	4
(Alberta) Lindsay Makichuk	3

Semifinals
(Manitoba) Cathy Overton-Clapham	9
(Manitoba) Darcy Robertson	6
(Alberta) Leslie Rogers	1
(Alberta) Amy Nixon	5

Qualifier 7
(Manitoba) Cathy Overton-Clapham	4
(Alberta) Amy Nixon	3

Third Knockout
(Alberta) Chana Martineau	3
(Alberta) Tiffany Odegard	7
(Saskatchewan) Brett Barber	6
(Alberta) Tiffany Steuber	7

Quarterfinals
(Russia) Anna Sidorova	7
(Alberta) Tiffany Odegard	1
(Alberta) Valerie Sweeting	5
(Alberta) Tiffany Steuber	1

Semifinals
(Russia) Anna Sidorova	1
(Alberta) Valerie Sweeting	6

Qualifier 8
(Alberta) Valerie Sweeting	4
(Alberta) Renée Sonnenberg	3

=== Playoffs ===
Quarterfinals
(Alberta) Crystal Webster	8
(Alberta) Valerie Sweeting	4
(Saskatchewan) Stefanie Lawton	5
(Alberta) Casey Scheidegger	3
(Saskatchewan) Amber Holland	1
(Manitoba) Cathy Overton-Clapham	6
(Manitoba) Chelsea Carey	4
(Manitoba) Kaitlyn Lawes	7

Semifinals
(Alberta) Crystal Webster	3
(Saskatchewan) Stefanie Lawton	2
(Manitoba) Cathy Overton-Clapham	4
(Manitoba) Kaitlyn Lawes	5

Finals
(Alberta) Crystal Webster	2
(Manitoba) Kaitlyn Lawes	6
