= 2024 Saville Shootout =

- Host city: Edmonton, Alberta
- Arena: Saville Community Sports Centre
- Dates: September 6–9
- Men's winner: (Saskatchewan) Team McEwen
- Curling club: Nutana CC, Saskatoon
- Skip: Mike McEwen
- Third: Colton Flasch
- Second: Kevin Marsh
- Lead: Dan Marsh
- Finalist: (Manitoba) Jordon McDonald
- Women's winner: (Japan) Team Tabata
- Curling club: Hokkaido Bank CS, Sapporo
- Skip: Miku Nihira
- Fourth: Momoha Tabata
- Second: Sae Yamamoto
- Lead: Mikoto Nakajima
- Alternate: Ayami Ito
- Coach: Hiroshi Sato
- Finalist: (Japan) Satsuki Fujisawa

The 2024 Saville Shootout was held from September 6 to 9 at the Saville Community Sports Centre in Edmonton, Alberta. The event was held in a round robin format with a $25,000 purse on both the men's and women's sides.

In the men's final, reigning Brier silver medalist Mike McEwen avenged his sole loss of the week, defeating Manitoba's Jordon McDonald 8–5 to win the event. After tying the score at four all, the McEwen rink, with Colton Flasch, Kevin Marsh and Dan Marsh stole two to take control of the game. To reach the final, Team McEwen finished 4–1 through the round robin and then won playoff games over Ethan Sampson and Rylan Kleiter in the quarterfinals and semifinals respectively. Team McDonald were one of only two teams to go through the round robin undefeated with a 5–0 record. In the playoffs, they eliminated both Yusuke Morozumi and Reid Carruthers to enter the final. Kevin Koe and Evan van Amsterdam rounded out the playoff field.

In an all-Japanese women's final, Hokkaido Bank's Momoha Tabata rink stole three in the eighth end to defeat Loco Solare's Satsuki Fujisawa 7–5. It was the Tabata rinks third event title of the season, having also won the Ice Gold Cup and the Argo Graphics Cup domestically. The Hokkaido Bank team, which is led by Miku Nihira, finished the round robin with a 4–1 record to qualify for the playoffs. They then defeated Gim Eun-ji and Kaitlyn Lawes in the quarterfinals and semifinals to reach the championship match. Team Fujisawa also finished 4–1 through the round robin before taking playoff victories over Myla Plett and Ikue Kitazawa. Gracelyn Richards and Kerri Einarson also qualified for the final eight but lost in their respective quarterfinal matchups.

== Men ==
=== Teams ===
The teams are listed as follows:

| Skip | Third | Second | Lead | Alternate | Locale |
|---|---|---|---|---|---|
| Reid Carruthers | Catlin Schneider | Derek Samagalski | Connor Njegovan | | Winnipeg, Manitoba |
| Zachary Davies | Ronan Peterson | William Butler | Lucas Sawiak | | Edmonton, Alberta |
| Andrew Dunbar | Chris Kennedy | Mike Lambert | John Ritchie | | Edmonton, Alberta |
| Scott Dunnam | Cody Clouser | Lance Wheeler | Andrew Dunnam | | (United States) Philadelphia, Pennsylvania |
| Ryan Jacques | Ryan Parent | Jordan Tardi | Ethan Drysdale | | Edmonton, Alberta |
| Rylan Kleiter | Joshua Mattern | Matthew Hall | Trevor Johnson | | Saskatoon, Saskatchewan |
| Kevin Koe | Tyler Tardi | Jacques Gauthier | Karrick Martin | | Calgary, Alberta |
| Steve Laycock | Shaun Meachem | Chris Haichert | Brayden Grindheim | | Swift Current, Saskatchewan |
| Jacob Libbus | Nathan Molberg | Zachary Pawliuk | Michael Henricks | | Black Diamond, Alberta |
| Takumi Maeda | Asei Nakahara | Hiroki Maeda | Uryu Kamikawa | Ryoji Onodera | Tokoro, Japan |
| Jordon McDonald | Dallas Burgess | Calan MacIsaac (Note: Calan MacIsaac spared for Elias Huminicki.) | Cameron Olafson | | Winnipeg, Manitoba |
| Mike McEwen | Colton Flasch | Kevin Marsh | Dan Marsh | | Saskatoon, Saskatchewan |
| Yusuke Morozumi | Yuta Matsumura | Ryotaro Shukuya | Masaki Iwai | Kosuke Morozumi | Karuizawa, Japan |
| Brent Pierce | Matthew Blandford | Cody Johnston | Nicholas Umbach | | New Westminster, British Columbia |
| Ethan Sampson | Coleman Thurston | Jacob Zeman | Marius Kleinas | | (United States) Chaska, Minnesota |
| Chase Sinnett | Samuel Strouse | Kevin Tuma | Connor Kauffman | | (United States) Minneapolis, Minnesota |
| Aaron Sluchinski | Jeremy Harty | Kyle Doering | Dylan Webster | | Airdrie, Alberta |
| Johnson Tao | Jaedon Neuert | Benjamin Morin | Andrew Nowell | | Edmonton, Alberta |
| Evan van Amsterdam | Jason Ginter | Sterling Middleton | Parker Konschuh | Darren Moulding | Edmonton, Alberta |
| Kenan Wipf | Ky Macaulay | Michael Keenan | Max Cinnamon | | Calgary, Alberta |

=== Round robin standings ===
Final Round Robin Standings

Key
| Teams to Playoffs |

| Pool A | W | L | PF | PA |
|---|---|---|---|---|
| (Alberta) Kevin Koe | 5 | 0 | 37 | 15 |
| (Alberta) Evan van Amsterdam | 4 | 1 | 33 | 23 |
| (Japan) Takumi Maeda | 3 | 2 | 30 | 23 |
| (Alberta) Andrew Dunbar | 1 | 4 | 23 | 34 |
| (Alberta) Ryan Jacques | 0 | 5 | 17 | 39 |

| Pool B | W | L | PF | PA |
|---|---|---|---|---|
| (Manitoba) Reid Carruthers | 4 | 1 | 32 | 21 |
| (Saskatchewan) Rylan Kleiter | 3 | 2 | 26 | 22 |
| (Alberta) Johnson Tao | 2 | 3 | 27 | 36 |
| (Alberta) Kenan Wipf | 2 | 3 | 27 | 32 |
| (United States) Chase Sinnett | 1 | 4 | 20 | 27 |

| Pool C | W | L | PF | PA |
|---|---|---|---|---|
| (Manitoba) Jordon McDonald | 5 | 0 | 36 | 22 |
| (Saskatchewan) Mike McEwen | 4 | 1 | 36 | 13 |
| (British Columbia) Brent Pierce | 2 | 3 | 25 | 29 |
| (Saskatchewan) Steve Laycock | 2 | 3 | 18 | 28 |
| (Alberta) Jacob Libbus | 1 | 4 | 20 | 32 |

| Pool D | W | L | PF | PA |
|---|---|---|---|---|
| (United States) Ethan Sampson | 4 | 1 | 31 | 15 |
| (Japan) Yusuke Morozumi | 3 | 2 | 32 | 24 |
| (Alberta) Aaron Sluchinski | 2 | 3 | 22 | 28 |
| (United States) Scott Dunnam | 1 | 4 | 19 | 30 |
| (Alberta) Zachary Davies | 1 | 4 | 14 | 32 |

=== Round robin results ===
All draw times listed in Mountain Time (UTC−06:00).

==== Draw 2 ====
Friday, September 6, 11:00 am

| Sheet 6 | 1 | 2 | 3 | 4 | 5 | 6 | 7 | 8 | Final |
| (Alberta) Andrew Dunbar | 0 | 1 | 0 | 2 | 1 | 0 | 0 | X | 4 |
| (Alberta) Evan van Amsterdam 🔨 | 2 | 0 | 1 | 0 | 0 | 3 | 1 | X | 7 |

| Sheet 7 | 1 | 2 | 3 | 4 | 5 | 6 | 7 | 8 | Final |
| (Alberta) Kevin Koe 🔨 | 2 | 0 | 0 | 1 | 0 | 2 | 2 | X | 7 |
| (Alberta) Kenan Wipf | 0 | 1 | 1 | 0 | 1 | 0 | 0 | X | 3 |

| Sheet 8 | 1 | 2 | 3 | 4 | 5 | 6 | 7 | 8 | Final |
| (Japan) Takumi Maeda 🔨 | 0 | 4 | 3 | 0 | 2 | X | X | X | 9 |
| (Alberta) Ryan Jacques | 0 | 0 | 0 | 1 | 0 | X | X | X | 1 |

| Sheet 9 | 1 | 2 | 3 | 4 | 5 | 6 | 7 | 8 | Final |
| (Manitoba) Reid Carruthers 🔨 | 0 | 0 | 0 | 3 | 1 | 0 | 0 | 1 | 5 |
| (United States) Chase Sinnett | 0 | 0 | 0 | 0 | 0 | 2 | 1 | 0 | 3 |

| Sheet 10 | 1 | 2 | 3 | 4 | 5 | 6 | 7 | 8 | Final |
| (Alberta) Johnson Tao 🔨 | 1 | 0 | 2 | 0 | 2 | 1 | 0 | 1 | 7 |
| (Saskatchewan) Rylan Kleiter | 0 | 3 | 0 | 1 | 0 | 0 | 2 | 0 | 6 |

Friday, September 6, 12:30 pm

| Sheet 1 | 1 | 2 | 3 | 4 | 5 | 6 | 7 | 8 | Final |
| (Alberta) Jacob Libbus | 0 | 1 | 1 | 0 | 1 | 0 | 1 | 0 | 4 |
| (Saskatchewan) Steve Laycock 🔨 | 2 | 0 | 0 | 1 | 0 | 1 | 0 | 1 | 5 |

| Sheet 2 | 1 | 2 | 3 | 4 | 5 | 6 | 7 | 8 | Final |
| (Saskatchewan) Mike McEwen | 1 | 1 | 0 | 3 | 2 | X | X | X | 7 |
| (Alberta) Zachary Davies 🔨 | 0 | 0 | 1 | 0 | 0 | X | X | X | 1 |

| Sheet 3 | 1 | 2 | 3 | 4 | 5 | 6 | 7 | 8 | Final |
| (Manitoba) Jordon McDonald 🔨 | 0 | 3 | 1 | 1 | 0 | 1 | 0 | 0 | 6 |
| (British Columbia) Brent Pierce | 1 | 0 | 0 | 0 | 1 | 0 | 1 | 1 | 4 |

| Sheet 4 | 1 | 2 | 3 | 4 | 5 | 6 | 7 | 8 | Final |
| (Japan) Yusuke Morozumi | 1 | 0 | 2 | 0 | 1 | 0 | X | X | 4 |
| (United States) Ethan Sampson 🔨 | 0 | 2 | 0 | 5 | 0 | 2 | X | X | 9 |

| Sheet 5 | 1 | 2 | 3 | 4 | 5 | 6 | 7 | 8 | Final |
| (United States) Scott Dunnam | 0 | 3 | 0 | 0 | 1 | 1 | 0 | 0 | 5 |
| (Alberta) Aaron Sluchinski 🔨 | 2 | 0 | 0 | 2 | 0 | 0 | 0 | 3 | 7 |

==== Draw 4 ====
Friday, September 6, 7:00 pm

| Sheet 6 | 1 | 2 | 3 | 4 | 5 | 6 | 7 | 8 | Final |
| (Japan) Takumi Maeda 🔨 | 2 | 0 | 0 | 1 | 0 | 2 | 0 | 3 | 8 |
| (Alberta) Johnson Tao | 0 | 2 | 1 | 0 | 1 | 0 | 2 | 0 | 6 |

| Sheet 7 | 1 | 2 | 3 | 4 | 5 | 6 | 7 | 8 | Final |
| (Alberta) Ryan Jacques 🔨 | 1 | 0 | 2 | 0 | 1 | 0 | X | X | 4 |
| (Alberta) Andrew Dunbar | 0 | 3 | 0 | 3 | 0 | 4 | X | X | 10 |

| Sheet 8 | 1 | 2 | 3 | 4 | 5 | 6 | 7 | 8 | Final |
| (Saskatchewan) Rylan Kleiter 🔨 | 0 | 1 | 0 | 0 | 0 | 1 | 0 | X | 2 |
| (Manitoba) Reid Carruthers | 0 | 0 | 2 | 0 | 3 | 0 | 2 | X | 7 |

| Sheet 9 | 1 | 2 | 3 | 4 | 5 | 6 | 7 | 8 | Final |
| (Alberta) Evan van Amsterdam | 0 | 0 | 3 | 1 | 0 | 0 | 2 | 0 | 6 |
| (Alberta) Kevin Koe 🔨 | 0 | 3 | 0 | 0 | 1 | 2 | 0 | 1 | 7 |

| Sheet 10 | 1 | 2 | 3 | 4 | 5 | 6 | 7 | 8 | Final |
| (Alberta) Kenan Wipf | 0 | 2 | 0 | 0 | 2 | 0 | 1 | 1 | 6 |
| (United States) Chase Sinnett 🔨 | 1 | 0 | 0 | 2 | 0 | 1 | 0 | 0 | 4 |

Friday, September 6, 8:30 pm

| Sheet 1 | 1 | 2 | 3 | 4 | 5 | 6 | 7 | 8 | Final |
| (Manitoba) Jordon McDonald | 0 | 0 | 2 | 1 | 2 | 0 | 3 | X | 8 |
| (United States) Scott Dunnam 🔨 | 1 | 0 | 0 | 0 | 0 | 1 | 0 | X | 2 |

| Sheet 2 | 1 | 2 | 3 | 4 | 5 | 6 | 7 | 8 | Final |
| (British Columbia) Brent Pierce 🔨 | 2 | 0 | 3 | 0 | 1 | 0 | 0 | 0 | 6 |
| (Alberta) Jacob Libbus | 0 | 3 | 0 | 2 | 0 | 0 | 3 | 1 | 9 |

| Sheet 3 | 1 | 2 | 3 | 4 | 5 | 6 | 7 | 8 | Final |
| (Alberta) Aaron Sluchinski | 2 | 0 | 0 | 0 | 4 | 0 | 0 | 1 | 7 |
| (Japan) Yusuke Morozumi 🔨 | 0 | 2 | 1 | 0 | 0 | 1 | 1 | 0 | 5 |

| Sheet 4 | 1 | 2 | 3 | 4 | 5 | 6 | 7 | 8 | Final |
| (Saskatchewan) Steve Laycock | 0 | 1 | 0 | 0 | X | X | X | X | 1 |
| (Saskatchewan) Mike McEwen 🔨 | 2 | 0 | 2 | 2 | X | X | X | X | 6 |

| Sheet 5 | 1 | 2 | 3 | 4 | 5 | 6 | 7 | 8 | Final |
| (Alberta) Zachary Davies | 0 | 0 | 0 | 2 | 0 | 1 | 0 | X | 3 |
| (United States) Ethan Sampson 🔨 | 0 | 2 | 0 | 0 | 2 | 0 | 2 | X | 6 |

==== Draw 6 ====
Saturday, September 7, 11:00 am

| Sheet 1 | 1 | 2 | 3 | 4 | 5 | 6 | 7 | 8 | Final |
| (Saskatchewan) Rylan Kleiter 🔨 | 0 | 1 | 0 | 2 | 0 | 3 | 1 | X | 7 |
| (Alberta) Kenan Wipf | 0 | 0 | 1 | 0 | 2 | 0 | 0 | X | 3 |

| Sheet 2 | 1 | 2 | 3 | 4 | 5 | 6 | 7 | 8 | Final |
| (Alberta) Johnson Tao | 1 | 0 | 1 | 1 | 0 | 0 | 0 | X | 3 |
| (Manitoba) Reid Carruthers 🔨 | 0 | 3 | 0 | 0 | 1 | 1 | 2 | X | 7 |

| Sheet 3 | 1 | 2 | 3 | 4 | 5 | 6 | 7 | 8 | Final |
| (Alberta) Evan van Amsterdam | 1 | 1 | 1 | 1 | 1 | 0 | 0 | 2 | 7 |
| (United States) Chase Sinnett 🔨 | 0 | 0 | 0 | 0 | 0 | 2 | 1 | 0 | 3 |

| Sheet 4 | 1 | 2 | 3 | 4 | 5 | 6 | 7 | 8 | Final |
| (Japan) Takumi Maeda | 0 | 1 | 0 | 2 | 1 | 1 | 3 | X | 8 |
| (Alberta) Andrew Dunbar 🔨 | 2 | 0 | 1 | 0 | 0 | 0 | 0 | X | 3 |

| Sheet 5 | 1 | 2 | 3 | 4 | 5 | 6 | 7 | 8 | Final |
| (Alberta) Ryan Jacques 🔨 | 2 | 0 | 0 | 0 | 1 | 0 | X | X | 3 |
| (Alberta) Kevin Koe | 0 | 0 | 2 | 1 | 0 | 5 | X | X | 8 |

Saturday, September 7, 12:30 pm

| Sheet 6 | 1 | 2 | 3 | 4 | 5 | 6 | 7 | 8 | Final |
| (British Columbia) Brent Pierce | 0 | 0 | 1 | 0 | 0 | X | X | X | 1 |
| (Saskatchewan) Mike McEwen 🔨 | 2 | 1 | 0 | 3 | 1 | X | X | X | 7 |

| Sheet 7 | 1 | 2 | 3 | 4 | 5 | 6 | 7 | 8 | Final |
| (United States) Scott Dunnam 🔨 | 1 | 0 | 1 | 0 | 0 | 1 | 0 | X | 3 |
| (Japan) Yusuke Morozumi | 0 | 1 | 0 | 2 | 1 | 0 | 3 | X | 7 |

| Sheet 8 | 1 | 2 | 3 | 4 | 5 | 6 | 7 | 8 | Final |
| (Saskatchewan) Steve Laycock | 1 | 1 | 0 | 0 | 2 | 0 | 0 | 1 | 5 |
| (United States) Ethan Sampson 🔨 | 0 | 0 | 1 | 1 | 0 | 1 | 1 | 0 | 4 |

| Sheet 9 | 1 | 2 | 3 | 4 | 5 | 6 | 7 | 8 | Final |
| (Alberta) Aaron Sluchinski 🔨 | 0 | 0 | 1 | 1 | 0 | 0 | 1 | 0 | 3 |
| (Alberta) Zachary Davies | 0 | 2 | 0 | 0 | 0 | 3 | 0 | 1 | 6 |

| Sheet 10 | 1 | 2 | 3 | 4 | 5 | 6 | 7 | 8 | Final |
| (Manitoba) Jordon McDonald | 0 | 0 | 3 | 0 | 0 | 1 | 0 | 2 | 6 |
| (Alberta) Jacob Libbus 🔨 | 1 | 0 | 0 | 0 | 1 | 0 | 2 | 0 | 4 |

==== Draw 8 ====
Saturday, September 7, 7:00 pm

| Sheet 1 | 1 | 2 | 3 | 4 | 5 | 6 | 7 | 8 | Final |
| (Alberta) Evan van Amsterdam | 1 | 0 | 3 | 0 | 0 | 0 | 1 | 1 | 6 |
| (Japan) Takumi Maeda 🔨 | 0 | 1 | 0 | 1 | 1 | 1 | 0 | 0 | 4 |

| Sheet 2 | 1 | 2 | 3 | 4 | 5 | 6 | 7 | 8 | Final |
| (Alberta) Ryan Jacques | 1 | 0 | 0 | 1 | 0 | 1 | 0 | 1 | 4 |
| (Saskatchewan) Rylan Kleiter 🔨 | 0 | 0 | 2 | 0 | 2 | 0 | 1 | 0 | 5 |

| Sheet 3 | 1 | 2 | 3 | 4 | 5 | 6 | 7 | 8 | Final |
| (Alberta) Kenan Wipf | 2 | 0 | 2 | 0 | 2 | 0 | 2 | 1 | 9 |
| (Manitoba) Reid Carruthers 🔨 | 0 | 2 | 0 | 2 | 0 | 2 | 0 | 0 | 6 |

| Sheet 4 | 1 | 2 | 3 | 4 | 5 | 6 | 7 | 8 | Final |
| (United States) Chase Sinnett | 0 | 2 | 3 | 0 | 4 | X | X | X | 9 |
| (Alberta) Johnson Tao 🔨 | 1 | 0 | 0 | 2 | 0 | X | X | X | 3 |

| Sheet 5 | 1 | 2 | 3 | 4 | 5 | 6 | 7 | 8 | Final |
| (Alberta) Kevin Koe | 2 | 0 | 2 | 1 | 1 | 2 | X | X | 8 |
| (Alberta) Andrew Dunbar 🔨 | 0 | 2 | 0 | 0 | 0 | 0 | X | X | 2 |

Saturday, September 7, 8:30 pm

| Sheet 6 | 1 | 2 | 3 | 4 | 5 | 6 | 7 | 8 | Final |
| (Alberta) Zachary Davies | 0 | 1 | 0 | 0 | 2 | 0 | 0 | X | 3 |
| (Japan) Yusuke Morozumi 🔨 | 1 | 0 | 1 | 1 | 0 | 4 | 2 | X | 9 |

| Sheet 7 | 1 | 2 | 3 | 4 | 5 | 6 | 7 | 8 | Final |
| (Saskatchewan) Steve Laycock | 0 | 1 | 0 | 2 | 0 | 0 | 1 | X | 4 |
| (Manitoba) Jordon McDonald 🔨 | 1 | 0 | 1 | 0 | 2 | 3 | 0 | X | 7 |

| Sheet 8 | 1 | 2 | 3 | 4 | 5 | 6 | 7 | 8 | Final |
| (British Columbia) Brent Pierce 🔨 | 1 | 2 | 0 | 1 | 1 | 0 | 1 | 1 | 7 |
| (Alberta) Aaron Sluchinski | 0 | 0 | 2 | 0 | 0 | 2 | 0 | 0 | 4 |

| Sheet 9 | 1 | 2 | 3 | 4 | 5 | 6 | 7 | 8 | Final |
| (Saskatchewan) Mike McEwen | 0 | 2 | 2 | 1 | 3 | X | X | X | 8 |
| (Alberta) Jacob Libbus 🔨 | 1 | 0 | 0 | 0 | 0 | X | X | X | 1 |

| Sheet 10 | 1 | 2 | 3 | 4 | 5 | 6 | 7 | 8 | Final |
| (United States) Ethan Sampson 🔨 | 2 | 2 | 0 | 0 | 0 | 3 | X | X | 7 |
| (United States) Scott Dunnam | 0 | 0 | 0 | 1 | 1 | 0 | X | X | 2 |

==== Draw 10 ====
Sunday, September 8, 2:00 pm

| Sheet 1 | 1 | 2 | 3 | 4 | 5 | 6 | 7 | 8 | Final |
| (United States) Ethan Sampson | 0 | 0 | 0 | 2 | 1 | 1 | 1 | X | 5 |
| (Alberta) Aaron Sluchinski 🔨 | 0 | 1 | 0 | 0 | 0 | 0 | 0 | X | 1 |

| Sheet 2 | 1 | 2 | 3 | 4 | 5 | 6 | 7 | 8 | Final |
| (United States) Chase Sinnett | 0 | 1 | 0 | 0 | 0 | 0 | 0 | X | 1 |
| (Saskatchewan) Rylan Kleiter 🔨 | 0 | 0 | 0 | 0 | 2 | 1 | 3 | X | 6 |

| Sheet 3 | 1 | 2 | 3 | 4 | 5 | 6 | 7 | 8 | Final |
| (Alberta) Jacob Libbus | 0 | 0 | 0 | 2 | 0 | X | X | X | 2 |
| (Japan) Yusuke Morozumi 🔨 | 0 | 1 | 1 | 0 | 5 | X | X | X | 7 |

| Sheet 4 | 1 | 2 | 3 | 4 | 5 | 6 | 7 | 8 | Final |
| (Alberta) Evan van Amsterdam 🔨 | 3 | 0 | 0 | 0 | 0 | 1 | 0 | 3 | 7 |
| (Alberta) Ryan Jacques | 0 | 2 | 1 | 1 | 0 | 0 | 1 | 0 | 5 |

| Sheet 5 | 1 | 2 | 3 | 4 | 5 | 6 | 7 | 8 | Final |
| (Alberta) Andrew Dunbar | 0 | 2 | 0 | 0 | 0 | 2 | 0 | X | 4 |
| (Manitoba) Reid Carruthers 🔨 | 3 | 0 | 2 | 0 | 1 | 0 | 1 | X | 7 |

| Sheet 6 | 1 | 2 | 3 | 4 | 5 | 6 | 7 | 8 | Final |
| (Saskatchewan) Mike McEwen | 0 | 3 | 0 | 3 | 2 | 0 | 0 | 0 | 8 |
| (Manitoba) Jordon McDonald 🔨 | 1 | 0 | 4 | 0 | 0 | 2 | 1 | 1 | 9 |

| Sheet 7 | 1 | 2 | 3 | 4 | 5 | 6 | 7 | 8 | Final |
| (Alberta) Zachary Davies | 0 | 0 | 0 | 1 | 0 | X | X | X | 1 |
| (United States) Scott Dunnam 🔨 | 0 | 3 | 3 | 0 | 1 | X | X | X | 7 |

| Sheet 8 | 1 | 2 | 3 | 4 | 5 | 6 | 7 | 8 | Final |
| (Alberta) Kevin Koe 🔨 | 1 | 1 | 2 | 0 | 2 | 1 | X | X | 7 |
| (Japan) Takumi Maeda | 0 | 0 | 0 | 1 | 0 | 0 | X | X | 1 |

| Sheet 9 | 1 | 2 | 3 | 4 | 5 | 6 | 7 | 8 | Final |
| (Saskatchewan) Steve Laycock 🔨 | 1 | 0 | 1 | 1 | 0 | 0 | 0 | 0 | 3 |
| (British Columbia) Brent Pierce | 0 | 1 | 0 | 0 | 0 | 2 | 1 | 3 | 7 |

| Sheet 10 | 1 | 2 | 3 | 4 | 5 | 6 | 7 | 8 | Final |
| (Alberta) Kenan Wipf | 0 | 1 | 0 | 3 | 0 | 0 | 2 | 0 | 6 |
| (Alberta) Johnson Tao 🔨 | 2 | 0 | 2 | 0 | 1 | 1 | 0 | 2 | 8 |

=== Playoffs ===
Quarterfinals
1 | (Alberta) Kevin Koe | 6
8 | (Saskatchewan) Rylan Kleiter | 8
4 | (United States) Ethan Sampson | 5
5 | (Saskatchewan) Mike McEwen | 7
2 | (Manitoba) Jordon McDonald | 8
7 | (Japan) Yusuke Morozumi | 7
3 | (Manitoba) Reid Carruthers | 8
6 | (Alberta) Evan van Amsterdam | 4

Semifinals
8 | (Saskatchewan) Rylan Kleiter | 4
5 | (Saskatchewan) Mike McEwen | 7
2 | (Manitoba) Jordon McDonald | 5
3 | (Manitoba) Reid Carruthers | 4

Final
5 | (Saskatchewan) Mike McEwen | 8
2 | (Manitoba) Jordon McDonald | 5

==== Quarterfinals ====
Monday, September 9, 8:30 am

| Sheet 3 | 1 | 2 | 3 | 4 | 5 | 6 | 7 | 8 | 9 | Final |
| (Alberta) Kevin Koe 🔨 | 0 | 0 | 3 | 0 | 0 | 1 | 0 | 2 | 0 | 6 |
| (Saskatchewan) Rylan Kleiter | 0 | 0 | 0 | 2 | 2 | 0 | 2 | 0 | 2 | 8 |

| Sheet 5 | 1 | 2 | 3 | 4 | 5 | 6 | 7 | 8 | Final |
| (United States) Ethan Sampson 🔨 | 0 | 0 | 3 | 0 | 0 | 1 | 0 | 1 | 5 |
| (Saskatchewan) Mike McEwen | 0 | 0 | 0 | 3 | 2 | 0 | 2 | 0 | 7 |

| Sheet 7 | 1 | 2 | 3 | 4 | 5 | 6 | 7 | 8 | Final |
| (Manitoba) Reid Carruthers | 0 | 4 | 2 | 0 | 1 | 0 | 1 | X | 8 |
| (Alberta) Evan van Amsterdam 🔨 | 1 | 0 | 0 | 2 | 0 | 1 | 0 | X | 4 |

| Sheet 9 | 1 | 2 | 3 | 4 | 5 | 6 | 7 | 8 | Final |
| (Manitoba) Jordon McDonald 🔨 | 1 | 0 | 0 | 3 | 0 | 3 | 0 | 1 | 8 |
| (Japan) Yusuke Morozumi | 0 | 2 | 1 | 0 | 1 | 0 | 3 | 0 | 7 |

==== Semifinals ====
Monday, September 9, 12:00 pm

| Sheet 5 | 1 | 2 | 3 | 4 | 5 | 6 | 7 | 8 | Final |
| (Manitoba) Jordon McDonald 🔨 | 0 | 0 | 0 | 1 | 1 | 2 | 0 | 1 | 5 |
| (Manitoba) Reid Carruthers | 0 | 0 | 1 | 0 | 0 | 0 | 3 | 0 | 4 |

| Sheet 7 | 1 | 2 | 3 | 4 | 5 | 6 | 7 | 8 | Final |
| (Saskatchewan) Rylan Kleiter | 0 | 1 | 0 | 2 | 0 | 1 | 0 | 0 | 4 |
| (Saskatchewan) Mike McEwen 🔨 | 1 | 0 | 1 | 0 | 2 | 0 | 2 | 1 | 7 |

==== Final ====
Monday, September 9, 3:30 pm

| Sheet 6 | 1 | 2 | 3 | 4 | 5 | 6 | 7 | 8 | Final |
| (Saskatchewan) Mike McEwen | 0 | 3 | 0 | 1 | 2 | 0 | 2 | X | 8 |
| (Manitoba) Jordon McDonald 🔨 | 2 | 0 | 2 | 0 | 0 | 1 | 0 | X | 5 |

== Women ==
=== Teams ===
The teams are listed as follows:

| Skip | Third | Second | Lead | Alternate | Locale |
|---|---|---|---|---|---|
| Corryn Brown | Erin Pincott | Sarah Koltun | Samantha Fisher | | Kamloops, British Columbia |
| Heather Nedohin (Note: Heather Nedohin spared for Kate Cameron.) | Taylor McDonald | Brianna Cullen | Mackenzie Elias | | St. Adolphe, Manitoba |
| Jolene Campbell | Abby Ackland | Rachel Erickson | Dayna Demmans | | Regina, Saskatchewan |
| Kerri Einarson | Val Sweeting | – (Note: Team Einarson played with three players.) | Krysten Karwacki | | Gimli, Manitoba |
| Stephanie Schmidt (Fourth) | Sara England | Ashley Williamson | Michelle Englot (Skip) | | Regina, Saskatchewan |
| Satsuki Fujisawa | Chinami Yoshida | Yumi Suzuki | Yurika Yoshida | | Kitami, Japan |
| Gim Eun-ji | Kim Min-ji | Kim Su-ji | Seol Ye-eun | Seol Ye-ji | Uijeongbu, South Korea |
| Serena Gray-Withers | Catherine Clifford | Lindsey Burgess | Zoe Cinnamon | | Edmonton, Alberta |
| Ikue Kitazawa | Seina Nakajima | Ami Enami | Minori Suzuki | Hasumi Ishigooka | Nagano, Japan |
| Kaitlyn Lawes | Selena Njegovan | Jocelyn Peterman | Kristin Gordon | Becca Hebert | Winnipeg, Manitoba |
| Jessica McCartney | Jenna Hope | Meaghan Frerichs | Michelle Johnson | | Saskatoon, Saskatchewan |
| Christine McMakin | Miranda Scheel | Jenna Burchesky | Rebecca Rodgers | | (United States) Fargo, North Dakota |
| Kaylee McNamee | Sarah McKinnon | Emily Hoggard | Sarah Guina | | Calgary, Alberta |
| Tabitha Peterson | Cory Thiesse | Vicky Persinger | Taylor Anderson-Heide | Tara Peterson | (United States) Saint Paul, Minnesota |
| Myla Plett | Alyssa Nedohin | Chloe Fediuk | Allie Iskiw | | Edmonton, Alberta |
| Taylor Reese-Hansen | Megan McGillivray | Kim Bonneau | Julianna Mackenzie | | Victoria, British Columbia |
| Gracelyn Richards | Emma Yarmuch | Sophie Ryhorchuk | Amy Wheatcroft | | Edmonton, Alberta |
| Robyn Silvernagle | Jessie Hunkin | Jessie Haughian | Kristie Moore | | Sexsmith, Alberta |
| Selena Sturmay | Danielle Schmiemann | Dezaray Hawes | Paige Papley | | Edmonton, Alberta |
| Momoha Tabata (Fourth) | Miku Nihira (Skip) | Sae Yamamoto | Mikoto Nakajima | Ayami Ito | Sapporo, Japan |

=== Round robin standings ===
Final Round Robin Standings

Key
| Teams to Playoffs |

| Pool A | W | L | PF | PA |
|---|---|---|---|---|
| (Alberta) Myla Plett | 3 | 2 | 28 | 18 |
| (Manitoba) Kerri Einarson | 3 | 2 | 31 | 22 |
| (British Columbia) Taylor Reese-Hansen | 3 | 2 | 28 | 27 |
| (Alberta) Selena Sturmay | 3 | 2 | 25 | 29 |
| (British Columbia) Corryn Brown | 0 | 5 | 18 | 37 |

| Pool B | W | L | PF | PA |
|---|---|---|---|---|
| (Manitoba) Kaitlyn Lawes | 4 | 1 | 30 | 19 |
| (Alberta) Gracelyn Richards | 3 | 2 | 30 | 32 |
| (United States) Tabitha Peterson | 3 | 2 | 29 | 27 |
| (Alberta) Serena Gray-Withers | 2 | 3 | 30 | 32 |
| (Saskatchewan) Michelle Englot | 1 | 4 | 21 | 27 |

| Pool C | W | L | PF | PA |
|---|---|---|---|---|
| (South Korea) Gim Eun-ji | 4 | 1 | 27 | 19 |
| (Japan) Team Tabata | 4 | 1 | 39 | 18 |
| (Manitoba) Team Cameron | 3 | 2 | 27 | 20 |
| (Saskatchewan) Jessica McCartney | 1 | 4 | 20 | 35 |
| (Alberta) Robyn Silvernagle | 1 | 4 | 19 | 29 |

| Pool D | W | L | PF | PA |
|---|---|---|---|---|
| (Japan) Ikue Kitazawa | 5 | 0 | 40 | 15 |
| (Japan) Satsuki Fujisawa | 4 | 1 | 31 | 23 |
| (Saskatchewan) Jolene Campbell | 1 | 4 | 26 | 34 |
| (United States) Christine McMakin | 1 | 4 | 18 | 30 |
| (Alberta) Kaylee McNamee | 1 | 4 | 13 | 37 |

=== Round robin results ===
All draw times listed in Mountain Time (UTC−06:00).

==== Draw 1 ====
Friday, September 6, 8:30 am

| Sheet 1 | 1 | 2 | 3 | 4 | 5 | 6 | 7 | 8 | Final |
| (Alberta) Myla Plett 🔨 | 1 | 2 | 0 | 2 | 1 | 0 | 1 | X | 7 |
| (British Columbia) Corryn Brown | 0 | 0 | 1 | 0 | 0 | 1 | 0 | X | 2 |

| Sheet 2 | 1 | 2 | 3 | 4 | 5 | 6 | 7 | 8 | Final |
| (Manitoba) Kerri Einarson 🔨 | 2 | 1 | 0 | 2 | 0 | 1 | 0 | 0 | 6 |
| (Alberta) Gracelyn Richards | 0 | 0 | 1 | 0 | 4 | 0 | 2 | 2 | 9 |

| Sheet 3 | 1 | 2 | 3 | 4 | 5 | 6 | 7 | 8 | Final |
| (Alberta) Selena Sturmay 🔨 | 1 | 0 | 0 | 0 | 1 | 0 | 1 | X | 3 |
| (British Columbia) Taylor Reese-Hansen | 0 | 2 | 2 | 1 | 0 | 1 | 0 | X | 6 |

| Sheet 4 | 1 | 2 | 3 | 4 | 5 | 6 | 7 | 8 | Final |
| (Manitoba) Kaitlyn Lawes | 1 | 1 | 0 | 3 | 0 | 2 | 1 | X | 8 |
| (Alberta) Serena Gray-Withers 🔨 | 0 | 0 | 1 | 0 | 2 | 0 | 0 | X | 3 |

| Sheet 5 | 1 | 2 | 3 | 4 | 5 | 6 | 7 | 8 | Final |
| (Saskatchewan) Michelle Englot | 0 | 0 | 0 | 0 | 0 | 1 | 1 | X | 2 |
| (United States) Tabitha Peterson 🔨 | 1 | 0 | 1 | 1 | 1 | 0 | 0 | X | 4 |

==== Draw 3 ====
Friday, September 6, 3:00 pm

| Sheet 6 | 1 | 2 | 3 | 4 | 5 | 6 | 7 | 8 | Final |
| (Saskatchewan) Jessica McCartney 🔨 | 1 | 0 | 0 | 0 | 1 | 0 | X | X | 2 |
| (Japan) Team Tabata | 0 | 2 | 2 | 4 | 0 | 1 | X | X | 9 |

| Sheet 7 | 1 | 2 | 3 | 4 | 5 | 6 | 7 | 8 | Final |
| (South Korea) Gim Eun-ji | 1 | 0 | 0 | 3 | 2 | 1 | X | X | 7 |
| (Alberta) Kaylee McNamee 🔨 | 0 | 0 | 1 | 0 | 0 | 0 | X | X | 1 |

| Sheet 8 | 1 | 2 | 3 | 4 | 5 | 6 | 7 | 8 | Final |
| (Manitoba) Team Cameron 🔨 | 0 | 0 | 0 | 0 | 1 | 0 | 0 | X | 1 |
| (Alberta) Robyn Silvernagle | 0 | 1 | 1 | 1 | 0 | 1 | 1 | X | 5 |

| Sheet 9 | 1 | 2 | 3 | 4 | 5 | 6 | 7 | 8 | Final |
| (Japan) Satsuki Fujisawa 🔨 | 1 | 1 | 0 | 2 | 0 | 0 | 0 | 3 | 7 |
| (Saskatchewan) Jolene Campbell | 0 | 0 | 2 | 0 | 1 | 0 | 1 | 0 | 4 |

| Sheet 10 | 1 | 2 | 3 | 4 | 5 | 6 | 7 | 8 | Final |
| (United States) Christine McMakin 🔨 | 1 | 1 | 0 | 0 | 0 | 1 | 0 | 0 | 3 |
| (Japan) Ikue Kitazawa | 0 | 0 | 0 | 2 | 2 | 0 | 1 | 1 | 6 |

Friday, September 6, 4:30 pm

| Sheet 1 | 1 | 2 | 3 | 4 | 5 | 6 | 7 | 8 | Final |
| (Alberta) Selena Sturmay 🔨 | 0 | 0 | 0 | 1 | 1 | 0 | 2 | 3 | 7 |
| (Saskatchewan) Michelle Englot | 1 | 1 | 3 | 0 | 0 | 1 | 0 | 0 | 6 |

| Sheet 2 | 1 | 2 | 3 | 4 | 5 | 6 | 7 | 8 | Final |
| (British Columbia) Taylor Reese-Hansen | 0 | 1 | 0 | 0 | 0 | X | X | X | 1 |
| (Alberta) Myla Plett 🔨 | 3 | 0 | 1 | 1 | 3 | X | X | X | 8 |

| Sheet 3 | 1 | 2 | 3 | 4 | 5 | 6 | 7 | 8 | Final |
| (United States) Tabitha Peterson 🔨 | 1 | 0 | 0 | 0 | 1 | 0 | 2 | 4 | 8 |
| (Manitoba) Kaitlyn Lawes | 0 | 0 | 1 | 1 | 0 | 2 | 0 | 0 | 4 |

| Sheet 4 | 1 | 2 | 3 | 4 | 5 | 6 | 7 | 8 | Final |
| (British Columbia) Corryn Brown | 0 | 0 | 0 | 0 | 0 | 0 | X | X | 0 |
| (Manitoba) Kerri Einarson 🔨 | 1 | 1 | 1 | 1 | 1 | 1 | X | X | 6 |

| Sheet 5 | 1 | 2 | 3 | 4 | 5 | 6 | 7 | 8 | Final |
| (Alberta) Gracelyn Richards 🔨 | 2 | 0 | 1 | 1 | 0 | 0 | 0 | 2 | 6 |
| (Alberta) Serena Gray-Withers | 0 | 1 | 0 | 0 | 1 | 2 | 1 | 0 | 5 |

==== Draw 5 ====
Saturday, September 7, 8:30 am

| Sheet 6 | 1 | 2 | 3 | 4 | 5 | 6 | 7 | 8 | Final |
| (Manitoba) Team Cameron | 0 | 4 | 2 | 3 | X | X | X | X | 9 |
| (United States) Christine McMakin 🔨 | 1 | 0 | 0 | 0 | X | X | X | X | 1 |

| Sheet 7 | 1 | 2 | 3 | 4 | 5 | 6 | 7 | 8 | Final |
| (Alberta) Robyn Silvernagle 🔨 | 1 | 0 | 2 | 1 | 0 | 0 | 2 | 0 | 6 |
| (Saskatchewan) Jessica McCartney | 0 | 2 | 0 | 0 | 3 | 2 | 0 | 1 | 8 |

| Sheet 8 | 1 | 2 | 3 | 4 | 5 | 6 | 7 | 8 | Final |
| (Japan) Ikue Kitazawa | 0 | 2 | 0 | 2 | 0 | 1 | 5 | X | 10 |
| (Japan) Satsuki Fujisawa 🔨 | 0 | 0 | 1 | 0 | 2 | 0 | 0 | X | 3 |

| Sheet 9 | 1 | 2 | 3 | 4 | 5 | 6 | 7 | 8 | Final |
| (Japan) Team Tabata 🔨 | 1 | 0 | 0 | 1 | 0 | 0 | 1 | 0 | 3 |
| (South Korea) Gim Eun-ji | 0 | 2 | 1 | 0 | 0 | 1 | 0 | 1 | 5 |

| Sheet 10 | 1 | 2 | 3 | 4 | 5 | 6 | 7 | 8 | Final |
| (Alberta) Kaylee McNamee | 0 | 2 | 1 | 0 | 0 | 0 | 0 | X | 3 |
| (Saskatchewan) Jolene Campbell 🔨 | 0 | 0 | 0 | 2 | 1 | 1 | 3 | X | 7 |

==== Draw 7 ====
Saturday, September 7, 3:00 pm

| Sheet 1 | 1 | 2 | 3 | 4 | 5 | 6 | 7 | 8 | Final |
| (United States) Tabitha Peterson 🔨 | 3 | 0 | 2 | 0 | 1 | 0 | 1 | 0 | 7 |
| (Alberta) Gracelyn Richards | 0 | 3 | 0 | 4 | 0 | 1 | 0 | 1 | 9 |

| Sheet 2 | 1 | 2 | 3 | 4 | 5 | 6 | 7 | 8 | Final |
| (Saskatchewan) Michelle Englot | 0 | 0 | 1 | 0 | 0 | 0 | X | X | 1 |
| (Manitoba) Kaitlyn Lawes 🔨 | 0 | 1 | 0 | 0 | 3 | 2 | X | X | 6 |

| Sheet 3 | 1 | 2 | 3 | 4 | 5 | 6 | 7 | 8 | Final |
| (British Columbia) Corryn Brown 🔨 | 0 | 0 | 3 | 0 | 2 | 0 | 2 | 0 | 7 |
| (Alberta) Serena Gray-Withers | 1 | 2 | 0 | 2 | 0 | 2 | 0 | 4 | 11 |

| Sheet 4 | 1 | 2 | 3 | 4 | 5 | 6 | 7 | 8 | Final |
| (Alberta) Selena Sturmay 🔨 | 1 | 0 | 2 | 0 | 1 | 1 | 1 | 0 | 6 |
| (Alberta) Myla Plett | 0 | 2 | 0 | 1 | 0 | 0 | 0 | 2 | 5 |

| Sheet 5 | 1 | 2 | 3 | 4 | 5 | 6 | 7 | 8 | Final |
| (British Columbia) Taylor Reese-Hansen | 0 | 0 | 2 | 1 | 0 | 2 | 0 | 0 | 5 |
| (Manitoba) Kerri Einarson 🔨 | 2 | 1 | 0 | 0 | 1 | 0 | 2 | 1 | 7 |

Saturday, September 7, 4:30 pm

| Sheet 6 | 1 | 2 | 3 | 4 | 5 | 6 | 7 | 8 | Final |
| (Alberta) Robyn Silvernagle 🔨 | 0 | 0 | 0 | 2 | 1 | 0 | 0 | 0 | 3 |
| (South Korea) Gim Eun-ji | 0 | 1 | 1 | 0 | 0 | 1 | 1 | 2 | 6 |

| Sheet 7 | 1 | 2 | 3 | 4 | 5 | 6 | 7 | 8 | Final |
| (United States) Christine McMakin | 0 | 2 | 0 | 1 | 0 | 0 | 1 | X | 4 |
| (Japan) Satsuki Fujisawa 🔨 | 2 | 0 | 2 | 0 | 1 | 1 | 0 | X | 6 |

| Sheet 8 | 1 | 2 | 3 | 4 | 5 | 6 | 7 | 8 | Final |
| (Japan) Team Tabata 🔨 | 0 | 1 | 0 | 2 | 0 | 3 | 0 | 4 | 10 |
| (Saskatchewan) Jolene Campbell | 2 | 0 | 1 | 0 | 2 | 0 | 3 | 0 | 8 |

| Sheet 9 | 1 | 2 | 3 | 4 | 5 | 6 | 7 | 8 | Final |
| (Japan) Ikue Kitazawa 🔨 | 2 | 0 | 3 | 3 | 2 | 2 | X | X | 12 |
| (Alberta) Kaylee McNamee | 0 | 1 | 0 | 0 | 0 | 0 | X | X | 1 |

| Sheet 10 | 1 | 2 | 3 | 4 | 5 | 6 | 7 | 8 | Final |
| (Manitoba) Team Cameron 🔨 | 2 | 1 | 0 | 1 | 0 | 0 | 3 | X | 7 |
| (Saskatchewan) Jessica McCartney | 0 | 0 | 2 | 0 | 0 | 1 | 0 | X | 3 |

==== Draw 9 ====
Sunday, September 8, 9:00 am

| Sheet 1 | 1 | 2 | 3 | 4 | 5 | 6 | 7 | 8 | Final |
| (Japan) Team Tabata 🔨 | 2 | 2 | 0 | 1 | 2 | 1 | X | X | 8 |
| (Manitoba) Team Cameron | 0 | 0 | 1 | 0 | 0 | 0 | X | X | 1 |

| Sheet 2 | 1 | 2 | 3 | 4 | 5 | 6 | 7 | 8 | Final |
| (Alberta) Kaylee McNamee | 0 | 0 | 0 | 1 | 0 | 0 | X | X | 1 |
| (Japan) Satsuki Fujisawa 🔨 | 2 | 1 | 1 | 0 | 3 | 1 | X | X | 8 |

| Sheet 3 | 1 | 2 | 3 | 4 | 5 | 6 | 7 | 8 | Final |
| (Alberta) Robyn Silvernagle | 0 | 0 | 1 | 0 | 0 | 1 | 1 | X | 3 |
| (Japan) Ikue Kitazawa 🔨 | 2 | 1 | 0 | 0 | 2 | 0 | 0 | X | 5 |

| Sheet 4 | 1 | 2 | 3 | 4 | 5 | 6 | 7 | 8 | Final |
| (Saskatchewan) Jolene Campbell 🔨 | 0 | 1 | 0 | 0 | 1 | 0 | 0 | X | 2 |
| (United States) Christine McMakin | 0 | 0 | 3 | 1 | 0 | 2 | 1 | X | 7 |

| Sheet 5 | 1 | 2 | 3 | 4 | 5 | 6 | 7 | 8 | Final |
| (South Korea) Gim Eun-ji 🔨 | 2 | 0 | 1 | 0 | 2 | 0 | 1 | X | 6 |
| (Saskatchewan) Jessica McCartney | 0 | 1 | 0 | 1 | 0 | 1 | 0 | X | 3 |

| Sheet 6 | 1 | 2 | 3 | 4 | 5 | 6 | 7 | 8 | Final |
| (British Columbia) Corryn Brown | 0 | 0 | 2 | 0 | 1 | 0 | 0 | X | 3 |
| (Alberta) Selena Sturmay 🔨 | 0 | 3 | 0 | 1 | 0 | 1 | 1 | X | 6 |

| Sheet 7 | 1 | 2 | 3 | 4 | 5 | 6 | 7 | 8 | Final |
| (Alberta) Gracelyn Richards 🔨 | 2 | 1 | 0 | 0 | 0 | 0 | 1 | X | 4 |
| (Manitoba) Kaitlyn Lawes | 0 | 0 | 2 | 1 | 2 | 1 | 0 | X | 6 |

| Sheet 8 | 1 | 2 | 3 | 4 | 5 | 6 | 7 | 8 | Final |
| (British Columbia) Taylor Reese-Hansen 🔨 | 1 | 1 | 0 | 2 | 0 | 3 | 2 | X | 9 |
| (United States) Tabitha Peterson | 0 | 0 | 1 | 0 | 2 | 0 | 0 | X | 3 |

| Sheet 9 | 1 | 2 | 3 | 4 | 5 | 6 | 7 | 8 | Final |
| (Alberta) Serena Gray-Withers | 0 | 1 | 0 | 2 | 1 | 1 | 0 | 3 | 8 |
| (Saskatchewan) Michelle Englot 🔨 | 2 | 0 | 1 | 0 | 0 | 0 | 1 | 0 | 4 |

| Sheet 10 | 1 | 2 | 3 | 4 | 5 | 6 | 7 | 8 | Final |
| (Manitoba) Kerri Einarson | 0 | 0 | 2 | 0 | 0 | 0 | 0 | 1 | 3 |
| (Alberta) Myla Plett 🔨 | 0 | 2 | 0 | 0 | 1 | 1 | 1 | 0 | 5 |

==== Draw 11 ====
Sunday, September 8, 7:00 pm

| Sheet 1 | 1 | 2 | 3 | 4 | 5 | 6 | 7 | 8 | Final |
| (Manitoba) Kerri Einarson | 1 | 0 | 2 | 2 | 0 | 4 | X | X | 9 |
| (Alberta) Selena Sturmay 🔨 | 0 | 2 | 0 | 0 | 1 | 0 | X | X | 3 |

| Sheet 2 | 1 | 2 | 3 | 4 | 5 | 6 | 7 | 8 | Final |
| (Alberta) Serena Gray-Withers 🔨 | 1 | 0 | 1 | 0 | 1 | 0 | 0 | 0 | 3 |
| (United States) Tabitha Peterson | 0 | 1 | 0 | 2 | 0 | 1 | 2 | 1 | 7 |

| Sheet 3 | 1 | 2 | 3 | 4 | 5 | 6 | 7 | 8 | Final |
| (Saskatchewan) Jessica McCartney | 0 | 0 | 2 | 0 | 1 | 1 | 0 | X | 4 |
| (Japan) Satsuki Fujisawa 🔨 | 3 | 2 | 0 | 1 | 0 | 0 | 1 | X | 7 |

| Sheet 4 | 1 | 2 | 3 | 4 | 5 | 6 | 7 | 8 | Final |
| (British Columbia) Corryn Brown 🔨 | 0 | 1 | 0 | 2 | 1 | 0 | 2 | 0 | 6 |
| (British Columbia) Taylor Reese-Hansen | 2 | 0 | 2 | 0 | 0 | 1 | 0 | 2 | 7 |

| Sheet 5 | 1 | 2 | 3 | 4 | 5 | 6 | 7 | 8 | Final |
| (Alberta) Myla Plett 🔨 | 1 | 0 | 1 | 0 | 0 | 1 | 0 | X | 3 |
| (Manitoba) Kaitlyn Lawes | 0 | 1 | 0 | 2 | 1 | 0 | 2 | X | 6 |

| Sheet 6 | 1 | 2 | 3 | 4 | 5 | 6 | 7 | 8 | Final |
| (South Korea) Gim Eun-ji | 0 | 1 | 0 | 2 | 0 | X | X | X | 3 |
| (Manitoba) Team Cameron 🔨 | 4 | 0 | 4 | 0 | 1 | X | X | X | 9 |

| Sheet 7 | 1 | 2 | 3 | 4 | 5 | 6 | 7 | 8 | 9 | Final |
| (Saskatchewan) Jolene Campbell | 0 | 1 | 0 | 1 | 2 | 0 | 0 | 1 | 0 | 5 |
| (Japan) Ikue Kitazawa 🔨 | 1 | 0 | 3 | 0 | 0 | 0 | 1 | 0 | 2 | 7 |

| Sheet 8 | 1 | 2 | 3 | 4 | 5 | 6 | 7 | 8 | Final |
| (Alberta) Kaylee McNamee 🔨 | 1 | 0 | 2 | 2 | 0 | 0 | 2 | X | 7 |
| (United States) Christine McMakin | 0 | 1 | 0 | 0 | 1 | 1 | 0 | X | 3 |

| Sheet 9 | 1 | 2 | 3 | 4 | 5 | 6 | 7 | 8 | Final |
| (Japan) Team Tabata | 1 | 0 | 5 | 0 | 3 | X | X | X | 9 |
| (Alberta) Robyn Silvernagle 🔨 | 0 | 1 | 0 | 1 | 0 | X | X | X | 2 |

| Sheet 10 | 1 | 2 | 3 | 4 | 5 | 6 | 7 | 8 | Final |
| (Alberta) Gracelyn Richards | 0 | 0 | 1 | 0 | 0 | 1 | 0 | X | 2 |
| (Saskatchewan) Michelle Englot 🔨 | 0 | 2 | 0 | 1 | 0 | 0 | 5 | X | 8 |

=== Playoffs ===
Quarterfinals
1 | (Japan) Ikue Kitazawa | 5
8 | (Manitoba) Kerri Einarson | 1
4 | (Alberta) Myla Plett | 5
5 | (Japan) Satsuki Fujisawa | 9
2 | (Manitoba) Kaitlyn Lawes | 6
7 | (Alberta) Gracelyn Richards | 5
3 | (South Korea) Gim Eun-ji | 5
6 | (Japan) Team Tabata | 8

Semifinals
1 | (Japan) Ikue Kitazawa | 3
5 | (Japan) Satsuki Fujisawa | 9
2 | (Manitoba) Kaitlyn Lawes | 4
6 | (Japan) Team Tabata | 7

Final
5 | (Japan) Satsuki Fujisawa | 5
6 | (Japan) Team Tabata | 7

==== Quarterfinals ====
Monday, September 9, 8:30 am

| Sheet 2 | 1 | 2 | 3 | 4 | 5 | 6 | 7 | 8 | Final |
| (South Korea) Gim Eun-ji | 0 | 2 | 0 | 2 | 0 | 1 | 0 | 0 | 5 |
| (Japan) Team Tabata 🔨 | 2 | 0 | 2 | 0 | 1 | 0 | 1 | 2 | 8 |

| Sheet 4 | 1 | 2 | 3 | 4 | 5 | 6 | 7 | 8 | Final |
| (Manitoba) Kaitlyn Lawes 🔨 | 2 | 1 | 0 | 0 | 1 | 1 | 0 | 1 | 6 |
| (Alberta) Gracelyn Richards | 0 | 0 | 1 | 0 | 0 | 0 | 4 | 0 | 5 |

| Sheet 6 | 1 | 2 | 3 | 4 | 5 | 6 | 7 | 8 | Final |
| (Japan) Ikue Kitazawa 🔨 | 1 | 1 | 0 | 0 | 0 | 1 | 2 | X | 5 |
| (Manitoba) Kerri Einarson | 0 | 0 | 0 | 1 | 0 | 0 | 0 | X | 1 |

| Sheet 8 | 1 | 2 | 3 | 4 | 5 | 6 | 7 | 8 | Final |
| (Alberta) Myla Plett | 0 | 1 | 0 | 3 | 0 | 1 | 0 | 0 | 5 |
| (Japan) Satsuki Fujisawa 🔨 | 2 | 0 | 1 | 0 | 1 | 0 | 2 | 3 | 9 |

==== Semifinals ====
Monday, September 9, 12:00 pm

| Sheet 3 | 1 | 2 | 3 | 4 | 5 | 6 | 7 | 8 | Final |
| (Manitoba) Kaitlyn Lawes | 0 | 0 | 0 | 1 | 0 | 2 | 1 | 0 | 4 |
| (Japan) Team Tabata 🔨 | 0 | 1 | 0 | 0 | 4 | 0 | 0 | 2 | 7 |

| Sheet 9 | 1 | 2 | 3 | 4 | 5 | 6 | 7 | 8 | Final |
| (Japan) Ikue Kitazawa 🔨 | 0 | 0 | 1 | 0 | 0 | 2 | 0 | X | 3 |
| (Japan) Satsuki Fujisawa | 0 | 2 | 0 | 3 | 2 | 0 | 2 | X | 9 |

==== Final ====
Monday, September 9, 3:30 pm

| Sheet 5 | 1 | 2 | 3 | 4 | 5 | 6 | 7 | 8 | Final |
| (Japan) Satsuki Fujisawa 🔨 | 3 | 0 | 0 | 1 | 0 | 1 | 0 | 0 | 5 |
| (Japan) Team Tabata | 0 | 2 | 1 | 0 | 0 | 0 | 1 | 3 | 7 |
