= Samantha Preston =

Canadian curler (born 1984)

- Curler
- Born: December 15, 1984 (age 41); Calgary, Alberta, Canada

Team
- Curling club: Calgary CC, Calgary

Curling career
- Top CTRS ranking: 7th (2011–12)

Samantha Preston (born December 15, 1984, in Calgary, Alberta) is a Canadian curler.

== Career ==
=== 2009–current ===
In 2009, Preston, as part of team Webster, was the first qualifier at the Canadian Olympic Pre-Trials. The team surprised many, winning the A final over former World Champion Kelly Scott. At the 2009 Canadian Olympic Curling Trials, the Webster rink finished with a 2–5 record.

To date, the Webster team has only won two Women's World Curling Tour events, the DEKALB Superspiel in 2009 and the Colonial Square Ladies Classic in 2011. Preston was a participant at the Grand Slam 2010 Players' Championships where the team lost to fellow Albertan Cheryl Bernard.

At the 2012 Alberta Scotties Tournament of Hearts the team qualified out of the fourth qualified for the playoffs. To do so, they successfully eliminated the defending Alberta champions Shannon Kleibrink. The team would defeat Valerie Sweeting 5-4 in the C1 vs C2 game, and faced Heather Nedohin in the semi-final. The team was ahead 5-4 in the tenth end, with hammer and would end up giving up a steal of one to be tied 5-5. In the eleventh end, again with the hammer, the team would give up another steal, allowing Nedohin to win the semi-final and eventually the Alberta championship. Because of the depth of competition in Alberta, to date Preston has been unable to represent the province at the Scotties Tournament of Hearts.

At the end of the 2011–12 curling season, Team Webster would finish in seventh place on the Canadian Team Ranking System (CTRS) which was enough to earn the final place in the 2012 Canada Cup of Curling, where the winning team will get a direct entry into the 2013 Canadian Olympic Curling Trials.

For the Webster team the 2012–13 curling season has had a successful beginning. The first event the team participated in was the 2012 The Shoot-Out, where they qualified for the playoffs, out of the A-side, before losing the final to Manitoba's Kaitlyn Lawes.

== Personal life ==
Preston works as a Marketing Coordinator, and has a degree in Business Administration with a major in Marketing.
