= 2013 Manitoba Scotties Tournament of Hearts =

- Host city: Stonewall, Manitoba
- Arena: Veterans Memorial Sport Complex
- Dates: January 23–27
- Winner: Team Jones
- Curling club: St. Vital CC, Winnipeg
- Skip: Jennifer Jones
- Third: Kaitlyn Lawes
- Second: Jill Officer
- Lead: Dawn Askin
- Alternate: Janet Arnott
- Finalist: Barb Spencer

The 2013 Manitoba Scotties Tournament of Hearts, Manitoba's women's provincial curling championship, was held from January 23 to 27 at the Veterans Memorial Sport Complex in Stonewall, Manitoba. The winning Jennifer Jones team represented Manitoba at the 2013 Scotties Tournament of Hearts in Kingston, Ontario.

== Qualification Process ==
Sixteen teams will qualify for the provincial tournament through several berths. The qualification process is as follows:

Qualification method	Berths	Qualifying team
Norman Region (Dec. 14–16)	1	Charlene Norquay
Parkland Region (Dec. 14–16)	1	Lisa Menard
Westman Region (Dec. 14–16)	2	Liza Park; Stacey Fordyce
Central Region (Dec. 14–16)	1	Deb McCreanor
Interlake Region (Dec. 14–16)	1	Kate Cameron
Eastman Region (Dec. 14–16)	1	Colleen Kilgallen
Winnipeg Region (Dec. 14–18)	3	Jill Thurston; Darcy Robertson; Karen Fallis
Scotties Berth Bonspiel (March 2012)	1	Chelsea Carey
Scotties Berth Bonspiel (November 2012)	1	Michelle Montford
2011–12 CTRS Points Berth	1	Cathy Overton-Clapham; Barb Spencer
Highest ranked team on the Manitoba Curling Tour at the conclusion of the MCT Championship	1	Janet Harvey
Defending champion from 2012 Manitoba Scotties	1	Jennifer Jones

== Teams ==
Skip	Third	Second	Lead	Alternate	Club(s)
Kate Cameron	Erika Sigurdson	Brandi Oliver	Lindsay Baldock	Kelsey Hinds	Stonewall Curling Club, Stonewall
Chelsea Carey	Kristy Jenion	Kristen Foster	Lindsay Titheridge		Morden Curling Club, Morden
Karen Fallis	Sam Murata	Jennifer Clark-Rouire	Jillian Sandison		Wildewood Curling Club, Winnipeg
Stacey Fordyce	Kelsey Russil	Janelle Vachon	Roslynn Ripley	Kristy Howard	Brandon Curling Club, Brandon
Janet Harvey	Cherie-Ann Loder	Kristin Loder	Carey Kirby		Assiniboine Memorial Curling Club, Winnipeg
Jennifer Jones	Kaitlyn Lawes	Jill Officer	Dawn Askin	Janet Arnott	St. Vital Curling Club, Winnipeg
Colleen Kilgallen	Janice Blair	Leslie Wilson	Lesle Cafferty	Cheryl Reed	Pinawa Curling Club, Pinawa
Deb McCreanor	Ashley Surminski	Heather Carson	Laurie Macdonell	Robin Campbell	La Salle Curling Club, La Salle
Lisa Menard	Melissa Barsewsky	Kim Merasty	Cassandra Lesiuk		Dauphin Curling Club, Dauphin
Michell Montford	Courtney Blanchard	D'Arcy Maywood	Sarah Neufeld	Shea Maywood	Assiniboine Memorial Curling Club, Winnipeg
Charlene Norquay	Tami Bodnaryk	Courtney Reeves	Kelly Hause		Burntwood Curling Club, Thompson
Cathy Overton-Clapham	Jenna Loder	Ashley Howard	Breanne Meakin		Fort Rouge Curling Club, Winnipeg
Liza Park	Darla Hayward	Pam Robins	Kortney Teale		Brandon Curling Club, Brandon
Darcy Robertson	Tracey Lavery	Vanessa Foster	Michelle Kruk	Karen Klein	Fort Rouge Curling Club, Winnipeg
Barb Spencer	Katie Spencer	Ainsley Champagne	Raunora Westcott	Holly Spencer	Assiniboine Memorial Curling Club, Winnipeg
Jill Thurston	Kristen Phillips	Brette Richards	Kendra Georges	Kerri Einarson	Granite Curling Club, Winnipeg

== Round-robin standings ==
Final round-robin standings

Key
Teams to Playoffs

=== Asham Black Group ===
Skip (Club)	W	L	PF	PA
Barb Spencer (Assiniboine Memorial)	6	1	63	28
Jennifer Jones (St. Vital)	6	1	60	24
Kate Cameron (Stonewall)	5	2	37	30
Michelle Montford (Assiniboine Memorial)	5	2	48	32
Janet Harvey (Assiniboine Memorial)	3	4	45	42
Deb McCreanor (La Salle)	2	5	35	56
Liza Park (Brandon)	1	6	36	61
Charlene Norquay (Burntwood)	0	7	16	69

=== Red Brick Red Group ===
Skip (Club)	W	L	PF	PA
Colleen Kilgallen (Pinawa)	6	1	53	42
Chelsea Carey (Fort Rouge)	5	2	52	32
Cathy Overton-Clapham (Fort Rouge)	4	3	46	42
Karen Fallis (Wildewood)	4	3	44	49
Darcy Robertson (Fort Rouge)	3	4	47	47
Jill Thurston (Granite)	3	4	45	41
Stacey Fordyce (Brandon)	2	5	36	50
Lisa Menard (Dauphin)	1	6	35	55

== Round-robin results ==
=== Draw 1 ===
January 23, 8:30 AM

- Montford 12-2 Norquay
- Spencer 10-4 McCreanor
- Jones 9-3 Park
- Cameron 8-4 Harvey

=== Draw 2 ===
January 23, 12:15 PM

- Thurston 9-6 Menard
- Kilgallen 7-3 Overton-Clapham
- Carey 6-2 Fordyce
- Robertson 8-1 Fallis

=== Draw 3 ===
January 23, 4:00 PM

- Jones 10-5 McCreanor
- Cameron 5-3 Montford
- Harvey 8-2 Norquay
- Spencer 9-4 Park

=== Draw 4 ===
January 23, 8:15 PM

- Kilgallen 7-6 Carey
- Fallis 7-4 Thurston
- Robertson 10-1 Menard
- Fordyce 7-6 Overton-Clapham

=== Draw 5 ===
January 24, 8:30 AM

- Spencer 9-2 Cameron
- Harvey 7-5 Park
- Montford 11-2 McCreanor
- Jones 13-1 Norquay

=== Draw 6 ===
January 24, 12:15 PM

- Fallis 8-5 Overton-Clapham
- Robertson 9-6 Fordyce
- Kilgallen 7-6 Thurston
- Carey 7-6 Menard

=== Draw 7 ===
January 24, 4:00 PM

- Montford 10-3 Park
- Jones 7-2 Cameron
- Spencer 9-1 Norquay
- Harvey 10-2 McCreanor

=== Draw 8 ===
January 24, 7:45 PM

- Thurston 8-1 Fordyce
- Carey 9-3 Fallis
- Overton-Clapham 8-3 Menard
- Kilgallen 10-6 Robertson

=== Draw 9 ===
January 25, 8:30 AM

- Overton-Clapham 8-7 Robertson
- Kilgallen 6-3 Menard
- Fallis 7-5 Fordyce
- Carey 9-2 Thurston

=== Draw 10 ===
January 25, 12:15 PM

- Spencer 11-9 Harvey
- McCreanor 8-3 Norquay
- Cameron 11-6 Park
- Montford 6-5 Jones

=== Draw 11 ===
January 25, 4:00 PM

- Fordyce 10-7 Kilgallen
- Thurston 11-3 Robertson
- Overton-Clapham 8-5 Carey
- Fallis 10-9 Menard

=== Draw 12 ===
January 25, 8:15 PM

- McCreanor 9-5 Park
- Montford 6-5 Harvey
- Jones 8-5 Spencer
- Cameron 9-1 Norquay

=== Draw 13 ===
January 26, 8:30 AM

=== Draw 14 ===
January 26, 12:15 PM

== Playoffs ==
Page playoff system
B1	Jennifer Jones	11
R1	Colleen Kilgallen	2
B2	Barb Spencer	8
R2	Chelsea Carey	5

Semifinal
R1	Colleen Kilgallen	3
B2	Barb Spencer	6

Final
B1	Jennifer Jones	9
B2	Barb Spencer	3

=== B1 vs. R1 ===
Saturday, January 26, 7:45 pm

Sheet A	1	2	3	4	5	6	7	8	9	10	Final
Jennifer Jones	3	1	0	2	2	0	2	1	X	X	11
Colleen Kilgallen	0	0	1	0	0	1	0	0	X	X	2

=== B2 vs. R2 ===
Saturday, January 26, 7:45 pm

Sheet C	1	2	3	4	5	6	7	8	9	10	Final
Barb Spencer	0	1	0	0	2	0	2	0	3	X	8
Chelsea Carey	2	0	0	1	0	1	0	1	0	X	5

=== Semifinal ===
Sunday, January 27, 9:30 am

Team	1	2	3	4	5	6	7	8	9	10	Final
Colleen Kilgallen	0	0	0	1	0	1	1	0	0	X	3
Barb Spencer	0	0	1	0	1	0	0	3	1	X	6

=== Final ===
January 27, 1:30 PM

Team	1	2	3	4	5	6	7	8	9	10	Final
Jennifer Jones	1	0	2	0	1	0	0	3	2	X	9
Barb Spencer	0	1	0	1	0	1	0	0	0	X	3

== Qualifying Events ==
=== Scotties Berth Bonspiel ===
The 2013 Scotties Berth Bonspiel, presented by Monsanto, will take place from November 16 to 18, 2012. The event will qualify two teams into the provincial playdowns.

== Regional Playdowns ==
Regional playdowns will take place from December 14 to 16, 2012 at various locations and will qualify a total of 11 teams to the provincial playdowns.
