= Breanne Knapp =

Canadian curler

- Curler
- Born: April 16, 1990 (age 36); Winnipeg, Manitoba

Team
- Curling club: Highland CC, Regina, SK
- Skip: Brooklyn Stevenson
- Third: Breanne Knapp
- Second: Callan Hamon
- Lead: Nicole Bender
- Alternate: Chelsey Emberley

Curling career
- Member Association: Manitoba (2006–2014); Ontario (2014–2016); Saskatchewan (2016–present)
- Hearts: 3 (2011, 2014, 2021)
- Top CTRS ranking: 4th (2011–12)
- Grand Slam victories: 1 (2011 Autumn Gold Curling Classic)
Medal record
Curling
Representing Canada
World Junior Championships
Silver medal – second place	2009 Vancouver
Winter Universiade
Silver medal – second place	2015 Granada
Representing Manitoba
Scotties Tournament of Hearts
Bronze medal – third place	2014 Montreal

Breanne Knapp (born April 16, 1990 in Winnipeg, Manitoba as Breanne Meakin) is a Canadian curler from Regina, Saskatchewan. She is a four-time Manitoba Junior Champion and a one-time Canadian junior champion (2009). She has won a silver medal at the World Junior Curling Championships.

== Career ==
=== Juniors ===
Knapp had a successful Junior career. At the Canadian Junior Curling Championships she won silver in 2007 and gold in 2009. While playing lead for the Kaitlyn Lawes team at the 2009 World Junior Curling Championships Knapp won a silver medal.

=== 2010–2013 ===
In 2010, Knapp would get a call from Cathy Overton-Clapham, who was unexpectedly dropped from Jennifer Jones's successful team, to play third stones on a new team, which included Raunora Westcott and Leslie Wilson, who were also let go from Jill Thurston's Manitoba team. Together the team would win their zone playdowns in attempt to get to the 2011 Manitoba Scotties Tournament of Hearts, however Knapp would not be able to participate in the provincial playdowns because she would be attending her final year at the Canadian Junior Championships. Karen Fallis would take the place of Knapp at third, ultimately winning the provincial championship. Since Fallis was part of the winning team, a decision was made that Knapp would sit as the 5th player during the 2011 Scotties Tournament of Hearts. Knapp would get a chance to play third during draw 9, when the team was in a critical situation, a 1–4 record, Fallis would play lead and Westcott would sit out. However, the change could not tip the scales in favour of Manitoba and they would continue with their losing streak to Nova Scotia. The team would finish the round robin with a 4–7 record.

At the end of the 2010-11 curling season, Cathy Overton-Clapham announced that Leslie Wilson and Raunora Westcott would leave her team. For the 2011-12 curling season, they would be replaced with Meakin's former junior teammate Jenna Loder and New Brunswick junior champ Ashley Howard. The new team went on to win the 2011 Autumn Gold Grand Slam title, Knapp's first, in the fall of that year. The team would also do well at the next Slam, losing in the semi-finals of the 2011 Manitoba Lotteries Women's Curling Classic. That year, Knapp would play in her first provincial championships at the 2012 Manitoba Scotties Tournament of Hearts. The Overton-Clapham rink had a disappointing event, finishing with a 5-2 round robin record, and losing in a tiebreaker. The team ended the season on a high note however, losing in the finals of the final Grand Slam of the year, the 2012 Players' Championship to Stefanie Lawton.

The 2012-13 curling season would be less successful for the Overton-Clapham rink. They played in four Grand Slams in the year, but failed to qualify for the playoffs in any of them. At the 2012 Curlers Corner Autumn Gold Curling Classic they went 2-3, at the 2012 Manitoba Lotteries Women's Curling Classic they went 2-3, at the 2012 Colonial Square Ladies Classic they went 2-3 and at the 2012 Masters they went 1-4. At the 2013 Manitoba Scotties Tournament of Hearts they finished the event with a 4-3 record, again missing the playoffs. Following the season, Knapp left the team to form her own rink with Katherine Doerksen, Briane Meilleur and Krysten Karwacki.

=== 2013–14 ===
Knapp began skipping her own team for the first time in her career for the 2013-14 curling season, with teammates Katherine Doerksen, Briane Meilleur, and Krysten Karwacki. Her rink would play in their first Slam together at the 2013 Manitoba Liquor & Lotteries Women's Classic. The team went 1-3 at the event, but it included a victory over former world champion Mirjam Ott. The team played in one other Slam that season, the 2013 Colonial Square Ladies Classic. In that event, the team was much more successful, going 5-2 in qualifying, including a win over Chelsea Carey. However, the team lost in the quarter-final of the event, against Allison Flaxey. Later in the season, Knapp was invited to be the alternate for team Manitoba at the 2014 Scotties Tournament of Hearts.

=== 2014–15 ===
For the 2014-15 season, Knapp was on a new team, skipping a rink consisting of Lauren Horton, Lynn Kreviazuk and Jessica Armstrong and was based in Ottawa. The team represented Canada at the 2015 Winter Universiade, where they would win a silver medal. The team had gone undefeated at the tournament, but lost in the final to Team Russia, skipped by Anna Sidorova.

=== 2016–2019 ===
Knapp moved back to Western Canada, and formed a new team in 2016 with Stephanie Schmidt, Brooklyn Lemon and Cori Debert. This lineup lasted just one season, and Knapp joined the Briane Meilleur rink, playing third one the team for the 2017-18 season. The team played in the 2017 Canadian Olympic Pre-Trials, losing in both the A and B finals, just missing out on qualifying for the main event. The team had less success at the 2018 Manitoba Scotties Tournament of Hearts, finishing with a 3-4 record. After the season, Knapp joined the Kristen Streifel rink at third. The team, which was based in Saskatchewan played in the 2019 Saskatchewan Scotties Tournament of Hearts. There, they made the playoffs with a 5-3 record. In the playoffs, they made it as far as the semifinal, where they lost to Team Sherry Anderson. In February 2019, Team Streifel announced that Knapp would be leaving the team after the season and taking a break from curling.

=== 2020–2021 ===
Knapp joined the Sherry Anderson rink for the 2020–21 season. Due to the COVID-19 pandemic in Saskatchewan, the 2021 Saskatchewan Scotties Tournament of Hearts was cancelled. Since the reigning champions, Team Silvernagle, did not retain three out of four team members still playing together, Team Anderson was invited to represent Saskatchewan at the 2021 Scotties Tournament of Hearts, as they had the most points from the 2019–20 and 2020–21 seasons combined, which they accepted. At the Hearts, they finished with a 6–6 sixth place finish.

== Grand Slam record ==
Key
C	Champion
F	Lost in Final
SF	Lost in Semifinal
QF	Lost in Quarterfinals
R16	Lost in the round of 16
Q	Did not advance to playoffs
T2	Played in Tier 2 event
DNP	Did not participate in event
N/A	Not a Grand Slam event that season

Event	2010–11	2011–12	2012–13	2013–14
Autumn Gold	Q	C	Q	DNP
Manitoba Liquor & Lotteries	F	SF	Q	Q
Colonial Square	N/A	N/A	Q	QF
Masters	N/A	N/A	Q	DNP
Sobeys Slam (Defunct)	SF	N/A	N/A	N/A
Players' Championships	Q	F	DNP	DNP

== Personal life ==
Breanne Knapp is a daughter of Rob Meakin, Canadian curler and coach, 1995 World Men's champion and a 1995 Labatt Brier champion. She is married and works as a dietitian with the Saskatchewan Health Authority.
