= 2010 Manitoba Lotteries Women's Curling Classic =

- Host city: Winnipeg, Manitoba
- Arena: Fort Rouge Curling Club
- Dates: October 22–25
- Winner: Chelsea Carey
- Curling club: Morden CC, Morden, Manitoba
- Skip: Chelsea Carey
- Third: Kristy Jenion
- Second: Kristen Foster
- Lead: Lindsay Titheridge
- Finalist: Cathy Overton-Clapham

The 2010 Manitoba Lotteries Women's Curling Classic was held October 22–25, 2010 in Winnipeg, Manitoba. It was the second Grand Slam event of the 2010-11 curling season. The total purse was $C60,000. $15,000 went to the winning Chelsea Carey rink who defeated Cathy Overton-Clapham in the final. Carey's team thus qualifies to play in the 2010 Canada Cup of Curling

== Teams ==
Skip	Third	Second	Lead	Locale
Cheryl Bernard	Susan O'Connor	Carolyn Darbyshire	Cori Morris	(Alberta) Calgary
Lisa Blixhavn	Lana Hunter	Jaimie Coxworth	Tanya Enns	(Manitoba) Winnipeg
Erika Brown	Nina Spatola	Ann Swisshelm	Laura Hallisey	(United States) Madison, Wisconsin
Joelle Brown	Tracey Lavery	Lesle Cafferty	Jennifer Sheppard	(Manitoba) Winnipeg
Chelsea Carey	Kristy Jenion	Kristen Foster	Lindsay Titheridge	Morden, Manitoba
Chantelle Eberle	Nancy Inglis	Allison Splupski	Debbie Lozinski	Regina, Saskatchewan
Michelle Englot	Lana Vey	Roberta Materi	Deanna Doig	Regina, Saskatchewan
Lisa Eyamie	Jodi Marthaller	Karallee Swabb	Kyla MacLachlan	(Alberta) Calgary
Karen Fallis	Sam Owen	Lisa DeRiviere	Jolene Rutter	(Manitoba) Winnipeg
Kerri Flett	Janice Blair	Susan Baleja	Alison Harvey	(Manitoba) Winnipeg
Janet Harvey	Cherie-Ann Loder	Kristin Loder	Carey Kirby	(Manitoba) Winnipeg
Amber Holland	Kim Schneider	Tammy Schneider	Heather Kalenchuk	Kronau, Saskatchewan
Rachel Homan	Emma Miskew	Alison Kreviazuk	Lisa Weagle	(Ontario) Ottawa
Colleen Jones	Heather Smith-Dacey	Blisse Comstock	Teri Lake	(Nova Scotia) Halifax
Jennifer Jones	Kaitlyn Lawes	Jill Officer	Dawn Askin	(Manitoba) Winnipeg
Stefanie Lawton	Sherry Anderson	Sherri Singler	Marliese Kasner	(Saskatchewan) Saskatoon
Patti Lank	Caitlin Maroldo	Jessica Schultz	Christina Schwartz	(United States) Lewiston, New York
Kim Link	Maureen Bonar	Colleen Kilgallen	Renee Fletcher	Brandon, Manitoba
Deb McCreanor	Laurie Macdonell	Stephanie Armstrong-Craplewe	Coralee Lamb	(Manitoba) Winnipeg
Sherry Middaugh	Jo-Ann Rizzo	Lee Merklinger	Leigh Armstrong	Coldwater, Ontario
Heather Nedohin	Beth Iskiw	Jessica Mair	Laine Peters	(Alberta) Edmonton
Cathy Overton-Clapham	Beanne Meakin	Leslie Wilson	Rauora Westcott	(Manitoba) Winnipeg
Allison Pottinger	Nicole Joraanstad	Natalie Nicholson	Sarah Lehman	(United States) Bemidji, Minnesota
Brette Richards	Cheryl Neufeld	Elisabeth Peters	Jillian Sandison	(Manitoba) Winnipeg
Holly Scott	Kari White	Tara Scott	Karen Hodgson	(Manitoba) Winnipeg
Kelly Scott	Jeanna Schraeder	Sasha Carter	Jacquie Armstrong	Kelowna, British Columbia
Renee Sonnenberg	Lawnie MacDonald	Kristie Moore	Rona Pasika	Grande Prairie, Alberta
Barb Spencer	Darcy Robertson	Vanessa Foster	Barb Mehling	(Manitoba) Winnipeg
Shauna Streich	Karen Klein	Kyla Denisiuk	Sue McCambridge	(Manitoba) Winnipeg
Jill Thurston	Kristen Phillips	Jenna Loder	Kendra Georges	(Manitoba) Winnipeg
Stina Viktorsson	Christina Bertrup	Maria Wennerstrom	Margaretha Sigfridsson	(Sweden) Skellefteå
Wang Bingyu	Liu Yin	Yue Qingshuang	Sun Yue	(China) Harbin

== Results ==
=== A Event ===
First Knockout
(Manitoba) Streich	5
(Manitoba) J. Jones	6
(Manitoba) Spencer	8
(Saskatchewan) Englot	1
(Alberta) Sonnenberg	6
(Ontario) Middaugh	3
(Manitoba) H. Scott	10
(Ontario) Homan	3
(Manitoba) Fallis	2
(British Columbia) K. Scott	7
(Manitoba) Richards	2
(United States) E. Brown	9
(United States) Lank	2
(Saskatchewan) Lawton	8
(Manitoba) Thurston	4
(United States) Pottinger	3

Quarterfinals
(Manitoba) J. Jones	4
(Manitoba) Spencer	6
(Alberta) Sonnenberg	6
(Manitoba) H. Scott	3
(British Columbia) K. Scott	9
(United States) E. Brown	4
(Saskatchewan) Lawton	6
(Manitoba) Thurston	5

Semifinals
(Manitoba) Spencer	5
(Alberta) Sonnenberg	6
(British Columbia) K. Scott	5
(Saskatchewan) Lawton	4

Qualifier 1
(Alberta) Sonnenberg	4
(British Columbia) K. Scott	3

First Knockout
(Sweden) Viktorsson	6
(Manitoba) Einarson	4
(Manitoba) Link	5
(China) Wang	8
(Alberta) Eyamie	3
(Manitoba) Harvey	7
(Nova Scotia) C. Jones	3
(Saskatchewan) Holland	7
(Manitoba) J. Brown	2
(Alberta) Nedohin	8
(Manitoba) Blixhavn	2
(Manitoba) Overton-Clapham	4
(Saskatchewan) Eberle	4
(Manitoba) Carey	5
(Manitoba) McCreanor	5
(Alberta) Bernard	6

Quarterfinals
(Sweden) Viktorsson	8
(China) Wang	6
(Manitoba) Harvey	4
(Saskatchewan) Holland	8
(Alberta) Nedohin	4
(Manitoba) Overton-Clapham	8
(Manitoba) Carey	8
(Alberta) Bernard	6

Semifinals
(Sweden) Viktorsson	3
(Saskatchewan) Holland	4
(Manitoba) Overton-Clapham	2
(Manitoba) Carey	7

Qualifier 2
(Saskatchewan) Holland	4
(Manitoba) Carey	6

=== B Event ===
Round of 16
(Manitoba) Streich	1
(Saskatchewan) Englot	4
(Ontario) Middaugh	9
(Ontario) Homan	1
(Manitoba) Fallis	7
(Manitoba) Richards	4
(United States) Lank	8
(United States) Pottinger	1

Quarterfinals
(Saskatchewan) Englot	3
(Ontario) Middaugh	6
(Manitoba) Fallis	6
(United States) Lank	4

Semifinals
(Ontario) Middaugh	7
(Sweden) Viktorsson	6
(Manitoba) Overton-Clapham	7
(Manitoba) Fallis	4

Finals
(Ontario) Middaugh	6
(Manitoba) Overton-Clapham	4

Quarterfinals
(China) Wang	7
(Manitoba) Harvey	3
(Alberta) Nedohin	2
(Alberta) Bernard	7

Semifinals
(China) Wang	5
(Alberta) Bernard	6

Finals
(Alberta) Bernard	3
(British Columbia) K. Scott	7
Qualifier 3
(Ontario) Middaugh	6
(British Columbia) K. Scott	5

Round of 16
(Manitoba) Einarson	9
(Manitoba) Link	3
(Alberta) Eyamie	4
(Nova Scotia) C. Jones	2
(Manitoba) J. Brown	5
(Manitoba) Blixhavn	9
(Saskatchewan) Eberle	3
(Manitoba) McCreanor	7

Quarterfinals
(Manitoba) Einarson	7
(Alberta) Eyamie	5
(Manitoba) Blixhavn	9
(Manitoba) McCreanor	7

Semifinals
(Manitoba) Spencer	8
(Manitoba) Einarson	5
(Saskatchewan) Lawton	3
(Manitoba) Blixhavn	1

Finals
(Manitoba) Spencer	4
(Saskatchewan) Lawton	6

Quarterfinals
(Manitoba) J. Jones	9
(Manitoba) H. Scott	3
(United States) E. Brown	5
(Manitoba) Thurston	2

Semifinals
(Manitoba) J. Jones	7
(United States) E. Brown	4

Finals
(Manitoba) J. Jones	6
(Saskatchewan) Holland	2
Qualifier 4
(Saskatchewan) Lawton	3
(Manitoba) J. Jones	4

=== C Event ===
Round of 16
(Manitoba) Streich	2
(Ontario) Homan	8

Quarterfinals
(Ontario) Homan	5
(United States) E. Brown	6
(Manitoba) Einarson	8
(Manitoba) Blixhavn	6

Semifinals
(United States) E. Brown	6
(Manitoba) Einarson	2

Qualifier 5
(United States) E. Brown	5
(British Columbia) K. Scott	9

Round of 16
(Manitoba) Richards	1
(United States) Pottinger	5
(Saskatchewan) Englot	7
(United States) Lank	4

Quarterfinals
(United States) Pottinger	2
(Manitoba) Harvey	6
(Saskatchewan) Englot	1
(Alberta) Nedohin	7

Semifinals
(Manitoba) Harvey	5
(Saskatchewan) Holland	6
(Alberta) Nedohin	8
(Manitoba) Spencer	2

Qualifier 6
(Saskatchewan) Holland	3
(Alberta) Nedohin	5

Round of 16
(Manitoba) Eyamie	6
(Manitoba) McCreanor	2
(Manitoba) Link	4
(Nova Scotia) C. Jones	5

Quarterfinals
(Manitoba) H. Scott	7
(Alberta) Eyamie	8
(Manitoba) Thurston	6
(Nova Scotia) C. Jones	2

Semifinals
(Alberta) Eyamie	1
(Manitoba) Overton-Clapham	9
(Manitoba) Thurston	3
(Alberta) Bernard	7

Qualifier 7
(Manitoba) Overton-Clapham	6
(Alberta) Bernard	5

Round of 16
(Manitoba) J. Brown	4
(Saskatchewan) Eberle	7

Quarterfinals
(Saskatchewan) Eberle	4
(China) Wang	2
(Sweden) Viktorsson	5
(Manitoba) Fallis	4

Semifinals
(Saskatchewan) Eberle	2
(Sweden) Viktorsson	9

Qualifier 8
(Saskatchewan) Lawton	9
(Sweden) Viktorsson	3

=== Playoffs ===
Quarterfinals
(Alberta) Sonnenberg	3
(Alberta) Nedohin	8
(Manitoba) Overton-Clapham	6
(Ontario) Middaugh	3
(Manitoba) Carey	7
(British Columbia) K. Scott	3
(Saskatchewan) Lawton	7
(Manitoba) J. Jones	5

Semifinals
(Alberta) Nedohin	7
(Manitoba) Overton-Clapham	8
(Manitoba) Carey	5
(Saskatchewan) Lawton	4

Finals
(Manitoba) Overton-Clapham	3
(Manitoba) Carey	7
