= 2012 Manitoba Scotties Tournament of Hearts =

- Host city: Portage la Prairie, Manitoba
- Arena: Portage Credit Union Centre
- Dates: January 25–29, 2012
- Winner: Team Jones
- Curling club: St. Vital CC, Winnipeg
- Skip: Jennifer Jones
- Third: Kaitlyn Lawes
- Second: Jill Officer
- Lead: Dawn Askin
- Alternate: Jennifer Clark-Rouire
- Finalist: Chelsea Carey

The 2012 Manitoba Scotties Tournament of Hearts, Manitoba's women's provincial curling championship, was held from January 25 to 29 at the Portage Credit Union Centre in Portage la Prairie, Manitoba. The winning team of Jennifer Jones, Kaitlyn Lawes, Jill Officer and Dawn Askin represented Manitoba at the 2012 Scotties Tournament of Hearts in Red Deer, Alberta, where they finished round robin with a 9–2 record, which was enough to finish 1st place and clinch a spot in the playoffs. Jones would lose both the 1–2 game and the semi-final before winning the bronze medal game over Quebec.

== Qualification process ==
Sixteen teams qualified for the provincial tournament through several berths. The qualification process is as follows:

Teams	Qualification Method	Berths	Qualifying Team
Team 1	Norman Region	1	Lori Forbes
Team 2	Parkland Region	1	Lisa Menard
Team 3	Westman Region	1	Liza Park
Team 4	Central Region	1	Lisa Deriviere
Team 5 (Note: Originally, the Eastman region was to be awarded a berth, but because there were no entries in the region qualifier, the berth was awarded to the Interlake region.)	Interlake Region	1	Kim Link
Team 6	Interlake Region	1	Kelsey Boettcher
Teams 7 & 8	Winnipeg Region	2	Jill Thurston; Janet Harvey
Team 9 (Note: These berths were awarded to the sport regions based upon each region's participation ratio.)	Westman Region	1	Kelsey Russill
Team 10	Winnipeg Region	1	Darcy Robertson
Team 11	Central Region	1	Terry Ursel
Teams 12 & 13	Scotties berth Bonspiel	2	Barb Spencer; Michelle Montford
Team 14	CTRS Points Leader from Manitoba	1	Jennifer Jones
Team 15	Highest ranked team on the Manitoba Curling Tour at the conclusion of the MCT Championship	1	Chelsea Carey
Team 16	Defending champion from 2011 Manitoba Scotties	1	Cathy Overton-Clapham

== Teams ==
=== Asham Black Group ===
Skip	Third	Second	Lead	Alternate	Club(s)
Kelsey Boettcher	Sam Murata	Brandi Oliver	Lindsay Baldock	Karen Fallis	Stonewall Curling Club, Stonewall
Lori Forbes	Janis Fjermistead	Renee Parsons	Rhonda Griffiths		The Pas Curling Club, The Pas
Jennifer Jones	Kaitlyn Lawes	Jill Officer	Dawn Askin	Jennifer Clark-Rouire	St. Vital Curling Club, Winnipeg
Darcy Robertson	Calleen Neufeld	Vanessa Foster	Michelle Kruk	Tracey Lavery	Fort Rouge Curling Club, Winnipeg
Kelsey Russill	Britany Lemon	Kristy Howard	April Jorgenson		Brandon Curling Club, Brandon
Barb Spencer	Karen Klein	Ainsley Champagne	Raunora Westcott	Katie Spencer	Assiniboine Memorial Curling Club, Winnipeg
Jill Thurston	Kerri Einarson	Kendra Georges	Sarah Wazney	Brette Richards	Granite Curling Club, Winnipeg
Terry Ursel	Wanda Rainka	Kendell Kohinski	Brenda Walker		Plumas Curling Club, Plumas

=== Red Brick Red Group ===
Skip	Third	Second	Lead	Alternate	Club(s)
Chelsea Carey	Kristy Jenion	Kristen Foster	Lindsay Titheridge	Lisa Blixhavn	Morden Curling Club, Morden
Lisa DeRiviere	Jolene Rutter	Heather Pierson	Alicia Pierson		Miami Curling Club, Winnipeg
Janet Harvey	Cherie-Ann Loder	Kristin Loder	Carey Kirby	Liz Peters	Assiniboine Memorial Curling Club, Winnipeg
Kim Link	Maureen Bonar	Colleen Kilgallen	Renee Fletcher	Lesle Cafferty	East St. Paul Curling Club, East St. Paul
Lisa Menard	Kim Merasty	Melissa Barsewsky	Cassandra Lesiuk	Leanne Urbanovitch	Dauphin Community Curling Club, Dauphin
Michelle Montford	Courtney Blanchard	Sara Jones	Sarah Norget	D'arcy Maywood	Assiniboine Memorial Curling Club, Winnipeg
Cathy Overton-Clapham	Jenna Loder	Ashley Howard	Breanne Meakin	Leslie Wilson	Fort Rouge Curling Club, Winnipeg
Liza Park	Tina Kozak	Pam Robins	Krystal Tillie-Stewart	Stacey Fordyce	Brandon Curling Club, Brandon

== Standings ==
=== Asham Black Group ===
Skip (Club)	W	L	PF	PA	Ends Won	Ends Lost	Blank Ends	Stolen Ends
Barb Spencer (Assiniboine)	6	1	57	26	32	22	4	11
Jennifer Jones (St. Vital)	5	2	56	31	30	27	2	9
Jill Thurston (Granite)	5	2	52	37	37	24	3	12
Darcy Robertson (Fort Rouge)	4	3	53	38	32	24	7	13
Kelsey Boettcher (Stonewall)	3	4	44	50	30	28	9	11
Kelsey Russill (Brandon)	3	4	37	47	27	27	8	6
Terry Ursel (Plumas)	2	5	38	51	26	30	6	5
Lori Forbes (The Pas)	0	7	11	65	10	39	2	1

=== Red Brick Red Group ===
Skip (Club)	W	L	PF	PA	Ends Won	Ends Lost	Blank Ends	Stolen Ends
Chelsea Carey (Morden)	5	2	54	30	28	22	9	8
Lisa DeRiviere (Miami)	5	2	41	37	25	25	13	5
Cathy Overton-Clapham (Fort Rouge)	5	2	51	32	32	23	7	11
Janet Harvey (Assiniboine)	4	3	56	34	25	27	8	4
Michelle Montford (Assiniboine)	4	3	48	44	27	27	6	6
Liza Park (Brandon)	2	5	34	40	23	26	7	7
Kim Link (East St. Paul)	2	5	32	54	26	22	3	8
Lisa Menard (Dauphin)	1	6	26	60	22	30	5	6

== Results ==
=== Draw 1 ===
January 25, 8:30 AM CT

Sheet A	1	2	3	4	5	6	7	8	9	10	Final
Robertson	5	2	1	5	1	X	X	X	X	X	14
Forbes	0	0	0	0	0	X	X	X	X	X	0

Sheet B	1	2	3	4	5	6	7	8	9	10	Final
Spencer	2	0	1	4	1	0	1	0	X	X	9
Ursel	0	1	0	0	0	1	0	1	X	X	3

Sheet C	1	2	3	4	5	6	7	8	9	10	Final
Russill	1	0	0	1	0	1	0	1	0	X	4
Jones	0	2	1	0	3	0	1	0	0	X	7

Sheet D	1	2	3	4	5	6	7	8	9	10	Final
Boettcher	0	0	0	0	3	0	0	2	0	0	5
Thurston	0	2	1	1	0	0	1	0	1	1	7

=== Draw 2 ===
January 25, 12:15 PM CT

Sheet A	1	2	3	4	5	6	7	8	9	10	Final
Montford	0	0	0	0	4	0	0	0	3	X	7
Menard	0	1	2	1	0	1	2	1	0	X	8

Sheet B	1	2	3	4	5	6	7	8	9	10	Final
Carey	0	0	2	0	0	2	0	2	0	X	6
Park	0	0	0	0	1	0	1	0	0	X	2

Sheet C	1	2	3	4	5	6	7	8	9	10	Final
DeRiviere	1	0	1	1	0	0	2	0	0	2	7
Overton-Clapham	0	3	0	0	1	1	0	1	0	0	6

Sheet D	1	2	3	4	5	6	7	8	9	10	Final
Link	1	0	1	0	0	3	1	1	1	0	8
Harvey	0	4	0	1	1	0	0	0	0	1	7

=== Draw 3 ===
January 25, 4:00 PM CT

Sheet A	1	2	3	4	5	6	7	8	9	10	Final
Ursel	0	0	0	1	0	0	1	1	X	X	3
Jones	2	1	2	0	3	0	0	0	X	X	8

Sheet B	1	2	3	4	5	6	7	8	9	10	Final
Robertson	0	0	0	0	0	4	0	1	2	0	7
Boettcher	0	0	1	2	1	0	1	0	0	3	8

Sheet C	1	2	3	4	5	6	7	8	9	10	Final
Forbes	0	0	0	1	0	0	0	0	X	X	1
Thurston	1	2	1	0	1	1	2	1	X	X	9

Sheet D	1	2	3	4	5	6	7	8	9	10	Final
Russill	0	1	0	1	0	1	0	X	X	X	3
Spencer	2	0	2	0	3	0	1	X	X	X	8

=== Draw 4 ===
January 25, 8:15 PM CT

Sheet A	1	2	3	4	5	6	7	8	9	10	Final
Park	0	0	1	1	0	1	0	0	1	0	4
Overton-Clapham	1	1	0	0	1	0	1	0	0	1	5

Sheet B	1	2	3	4	5	6	7	8	9	10	Final
Montford	0	2	1	0	3	0	3	X	X	X	9
Link	0	0	0	1	0	1	0	X	X	X	2

Sheet C	1	2	3	4	5	6	7	8	9	10	Final
Menard	1	0	1	0	1	0	2	0	X	X	5
Harvey	0	2	0	3	0	3	0	3	X	X	11

Sheet D	1	2	3	4	5	6	7	8	9	10	Final
DeRiviere	0	0	0	1	0	0	X	X	X	X	1
Carey	0	3	1	0	3	3	X	X	X	X	10

=== Draw 5 ===
January 26, 8:30 AM CT

Sheet A	1	2	3	4	5	6	7	8	9	10	Final
Spencer	0	0	4	0	1	0	1	0	2	X	8
Boettcher	0	0	0	1	0	1	0	2	0	X	4

Sheet B	1	2	3	4	5	6	7	8	9	10	Final
Thurston	2	0	3	0	3	4	X	X	X	X	12
Russill	0	2	0	1	0	0	X	X	X	X	3

Sheet C	1	2	3	4	5	6	7	8	9	10	Final
Robertson	0	0	2	0	2	1	0	2	2	X	9
Ursel	0	0	0	1	0	0	1	0	0	X	2

Sheet D	1	2	3	4	5	6	7	8	9	10	Final
Forbes	0	0	0	0	0	X	X	X	X	X	0
Jones	2	2	3	1	2	X	X	X	X	X	10

=== Draw 6 ===
January 26, 12:15 PM CT

Sheet A	1	2	3	4	5	6	7	8	9	10	Final
Carey	2	1	5	0	1	0	X	X	X	X	9
Link	0	0	0	1	0	1	X	X	X	X	2

Sheet B	1	2	3	4	5	6	7	8	9	10	Final
Harvey	0	0	0	0	1	0	0	0	1	X	2
DeRiviere	0	0	0	1	0	2	2	1	0	X	6

Sheet C	1	2	3	4	5	6	7	8	9	10	Final
Montford	1	1	0	0	3	0	1	1	3	X	10
Park	0	0	2	1	0	1	0	0	0	X	4

Sheet D	1	2	3	4	5	6	7	8	9	10	Final
Menard	0	0	0	0	0	1	0	X	X	X	1
Overton-Clapham	2	1	0	0	2	0	3	X	X	X	8

=== Draw 7 ===
January 26, 4:00 PM CT

Sheet A	1	2	3	4	5	6	7	8	9	10	Final
Kelsey	0	0	1	0	0	2	2	0	0	0	5
Robertson	0	0	0	2	1	0	0	3	1	1	8

Sheet B	1	2	3	4	5	6	7	8	9	10	Final
Jones	2	0	0	2	0	0	0	2	0	0	6
Boettcher	0	1	1	0	1	1	1	0	1	1	7

Sheet C	1	2	3	4	5	6	7	8	9	10	Final
Forbes	0	0	0	0	0	X	X	X	X	X	0
Spencer	2	2	2	1	3	X	X	X	X	X	10

Sheet D	1	2	3	4	5	6	7	8	9	10	Final
Thurston	0	3	0	2	0	1	0	2	0	1	9
Ursel	1	0	1	0	1	0	1	0	2	0	6

=== Draw 8 ===
January 26, 7:45 PM CT

Sheet A	1	2	3	4	5	6	7	8	9	10	Final
DeRiviere	0	0	1	0	1	0	1	0	1	0	4
Montford	0	0	0	2	0	1	0	1	0	1	5

Sheet B	1	2	3	4	5	6	7	8	9	10	Final
Overton-Clapham	3	0	1	3	0	0	1	1	X	X	9
Link	0	1	0	0	2	0	0	0	X	X	3

Sheet C	1	2	3	4	5	6	7	8	9	10	Final
Menard	1	0	1	0	0	0	0	X	X	X	2
Carey	0	2	0	3	1	1	2	X	X	X	9

Sheet D	1	2	3	4	5	6	7	8	9	10	Final
Harvey	2	0	2	3	0	X	X	X	X	X	7
Park	0	1	0	0	1	X	X	X	X	X	2

=== Draw 9 ===
January 27, 8:30 AM CT

Sheet A	1	2	3	4	5	6	7	8	9	10	11	Final
Carey	0	0	0	1	0	1	0	1	0	2	0	5
Harvey	0	2	1	0	1	0	0	0	1	0	1	6

Sheet B	1	2	3	4	5	6	7	8	9	10	Final
Park	0	1	1	1	0	1	0	0	2	X	6
Menard	1	0	0	0	1	0	1	1	0	X	4

Sheet C	1	2	3	4	5	6	7	8	9	10	Final
Link	0	0	0	1	0	1	1	0	1	1	5
DeRiviere	0	0	3	0	2	0	0	2	0	0	7

Sheet D	1	2	3	4	5	6	7	8	9	10	Final
Montford	1	0	1	0	2	1	0	0	X	X	5
Overton-Clapham	0	2	0	3	0	0	4	2	X	X	11

=== Draw 10 ===
January 27, 12:15 PM CT

Sheet A	1	2	3	4	5	6	7	8	9	10	Final
Spencer	0	1	2	1	2	0	0	0	3	X	9
Thurston	0	0	0	0	0	1	2	1	0	X	4

Sheet B	1	2	3	4	5	6	7	8	9	10	Final
Ursel	1	2	1	0	2	0	2	1	0	X	9
Forbes	0	0	0	1	0	2	0	0	1	X	4

Sheet C	1	2	3	4	5	6	7	8	9	10	Final
Boettcher	1	0	1	0	0	0	2	0	0	2	6
Russill	0	1	0	3	1	0	0	1	1	0	7

Sheet D	1	2	3	4	5	6	7	8	9	10	Final
Robertson	0	2	0	0	1	1	0	1	0	X	5
Jones	1	0	2	2	0	0	1	0	4	X	10

=== Draw 11 ===
January 27, 4:00 PM CT

Sheet A	1	2	3	4	5	6	7	8	9	10	Final
Park	0	0	0	0	2	1	0	2	0	X	5
DeRiviere	0	0	2	2	0	0	1	0	2	X	7

Sheet B	1	2	3	4	5	6	7	8	9	10	Final
Harvey	0	1	0	0	2	0	2	2	X	X	7
Montford	0	0	0	1	0	0	0	0	X	X	1

Sheet C	1	2	3	4	5	6	7	8	9	10	Final
Overton-Clapham	1	0	2	0	0	1	0	0	1	0	5
Carey	0	0	0	2	2	0	0	2	0	1	7

Sheet D	1	2	3	4	5	6	7	8	9	10	Final
Link	2	1	1	3	0	4	X	X	X	X	11
Menard	0	0	0	0	2	0	X	X	X	X	2

=== Draw 12 ===
January 27, 7:45 PM CT

Sheet A	1	2	3	4	5	6	7	8	9	10	Final
Ursel	0	0	0	1	1	0	0	1	0	X	3
Russill	2	1	0	0	0	0	2	0	4	X	9

Sheet B	1	2	3	4	5	6	7	8	9	10	Final
Thurston	0	2	1	0	1	0	1	0	1	2	8
Robertson	1	0	0	1	0	1	0	1	0	0	4

Sheet C	1	2	3	4	5	6	7	8	9	10	Final
Jones	0	1	0	0	2	0	1	0	2	0	6
Spencer	1	0	1	1	0	1	0	1	0	3	8

Sheet D	1	2	3	4	5	6	7	8	9	10	Final
Boettcher	0	0	0	1	0	2	2	1	1	X	7
Forbes	0	1	1	0	1	0	0	0	0	X	3

=== Draw 13 ===
January 28, 8:30 AM CT

Sheet A	1	2	3	4	5	6	7	8	9	10	Final
Overton-Clapham	1	1	1	0	1	1	0	2	0	X	7
Harvey	0	0	0	2	0	0	1	0	2	X	5

Sheet B	1	2	3	4	5	6	7	8	9	10	Final
DeRiviere	0	0	1	3	0	2	0	0	2	X	8
Menard	0	0	0	0	2	0	1	1	0	X	4

Sheet C	1	2	3	4	5	6	7	8	9	10	Final
Link	0	0	0	0	1	X	X	X	X	X	1
Park	3	3	2	3	0	X	X	X	X	X	11

Sheet D	1	2	3	4	5	6	7	8	9	10	Final
Carey	0	2	0	0	2	0	2	0	2	0	8
Montford	1	0	3	1	0	3	0	1	0	3	11

=== Draw 14 ===
January 28, 12:15 PM CT

Sheet A	1	2	3	4	5	6	7	8	9	10	Final
Jones	1	0	2	2	0	2	0	2	X	X	9
Thurston	0	1	0	0	1	0	2	0	X	X	4

Sheet B	1	2	3	4	5	6	7	8	9	10	Final
Russill	1	1	0	1	1	0	0	1	0	1	6
Forbes	0	0	1	0	0	1	0	0	1	0	3

Sheet C	1	2	3	4	5	6	7	8	9	10	Final
Boettcher	0	2	0	0	0	3	1	1	0	X	7
Ursel	2	0	4	0	2	0	0	0	4	X	12

Sheet D	1	2	3	4	5	6	7	8	9	10	Final
Spencer	0	0	1	0	0	0	2	2	0	0	5
Robertson	0	1	0	1	1	1	0	0	1	1	6

=== Tiebreaker ===
January 28, 4:00 PM CT

Sheet A	1	2	3	4	5	6	7	8	9	10	Final
DeRiviere	0	0	0	1	1	0	0	1	0	2	5
Overton-Clapham	0	1	0	0	0	0	2	0	1	0	4

Sheet C	1	2	3	4	5	6	7	8	9	10	Final
Jones	0	1	0	3	0	3	1	0	0	X	8
Thurston	3	0	1	0	1	0	0	0	0	X	5

== Playoffs ==
Page playoff system
B1	Barb Spencer	5
R1	Chelsea Carey	10
B2	Jennifer Jones	8
R2	Lisa DeRiviere	5

Semifinal
B1	Barb Spencer	5
B2	Jennifer Jones	7

Final
R1	Chelsea Carey	5
B2	Jennifer Jones	6

=== B1 vs. R1 ===
January 28, 7:45 PM CT

Sheet A	1	2	3	4	5	6	7	8	9	10	Final
Spencer	0	1	0	1	0	1	0	2	0	X	5
Carey	2	0	2	0	1	0	2	0	3	X	10

=== B2 vs. R2 ===
January 28, 7:45 PM CT

Sheet C	1	2	3	4	5	6	7	8	9	10	Final
Jones	2	0	0	1	0	2	0	1	1	1	8
DeRiviere	0	1	1	0	2	0	1	0	0	0	5

=== Semifinal ===
January 29, 9:30 AM CT

Team	1	2	3	4	5	6	7	8	9	10	Final
Spencer	1	0	1	0	0	1	0	0	2	X	5
Jones	0	2	0	2	1	0	0	2	0	X	7

=== Final ===
January 29, 1:30 PM CT

Team	1	2	3	4	5	6	7	8	9	10	Final
Carey	0	0	0	2	0	0	2	0	1	0	5
Jones	0	0	0	0	3	1	0	1	0	1	6

2012 Manitoba Scotties Tournament of Hearts

Jennifer Jones
Manitoba Provincial Championship title

== Qualifying Events ==
=== Scotties Berth Bonspiel ===
The 2012 Scotties Berth Bonspiel, presented by Monsanto, took place from November 11 to 14, 2011, at the Assiniboine Memorial Curling Club, in Winnipeg. The event was held in a triple knockout format, and qualified two teams, Michelle Montford and Barb Spencer, into the provincial playdowns.

==== A Event ====
Round of 16
Deb McCreanor	8
Lois Fowler	7

Quarterfinals
Deb McCreanor	9
Kim Link	10
Joelle Brown	7
Terry Ursel	6
Liza Park	10
Tracy Igonia	7
Meghan Armit	5
Janet Harvey	10

Semifinals
Kim Link	9
Joelle Brown	8
Liza Park	2
Janet Harvey	7

A Qualifier 1
Kim Link	9
Janet Harvey	4

Round of 16
D'arcy Maywood	7
Kelsey Russill	2

Quarterfinals
D'arcy Maywood	7
Barb Spencer	6
Lisa Menard	6
Michelle Montford	5
Jill Thurston	5
Betty Buurma	6
Darcy Robertson	8
Kelsey Boettcher	1

Semifinals
Meghan Armit	9
Terry Ursel	4
D'arcy Maywood	10
Lisa Menard	3

A Qualifier 2
D'arcy Maywood	6
Darcy Robertson	9

==== B Event ====
Round of 16
Kelsey Boettcher	8
Jill Thurston	4

Quarterfinals
Kelsey Boettcher	8
Lisa Menard	6
Kelsey Russill	9
Betty Buurma	2
Meghan Armit	9
Terry Ursel	4

Semifinals
Kelsey Boettcher	8
Kelsey Russill	1
Meghan Armit	8
D'arcy Maywood	5

B Qualifier 1
Kelsey Boettcher	7
Meghan Armit	5

Round of 16
Michelle Montford	11
Tracy Igonia	6

Quarterfinals
Michelle Montford	8
Joelle Brown	10
Lois Fowler	9
Liza Park	7
Barb Spencer	6
Deb McCreanor	3

Semifinals
Joelle Brown	3
Lois Fowler	6
Barb Spencer	7
Janet Harvey	5

B Qualifier 2
Lois Fowler	5
Barb Spencer	7

==== C Event ====
Quarterfinals
Jill Thurston	9
Deb McCreanor	2
Lisa Menard	1
Janet Harvey	9
Tracy Igonia	8
Terry Ursel	4

Semifinals
Jill Thurston	5
Janet Harvey	7
Tracy Igonia	4
Lois Fowler	7

C Qualifier 1
Janet Harvey	5
Lois Fowler	12

Quarterfinals
Liza Park	4
Kelsey Russill	7
Michelle Montford	10
D'arcy Maywood	2
Betty Buurma	3
Joelle Brown	9

Semifinals
Kelsey Russill	5
Michelle Montford	6
Joelle Brown	5
Meghan Armit	6

C Qualifier 2
Michelle Montford	9
Meghan Armit	3

==== Playoffs ====
Semi-Final
Kelsey Boettcher	4
Michelle Montford	9
Lois Fowler	5
Barb Spencer	8

Final
Michelle Montford	11
Kim Link	5
Darcy Robertson	2
Barb Spencer	5

Champions
Michelle Montford
Barb Spencer

== Regional Playdowns ==
=== Central ===
The Central Regional Playdowns took place from December 17 to 18, 2011, at the Plumas Curling Club in Plumas. The event qualified two teams to the provincial playdowns.

==== A Event ====
Semifinals
1	Deb McCreanor	8
4	Melanie Hanke Dickenson	6
3	Lisa DeRiviere	7
2	Terry Ursel	5

Final
Deb McCreanor	3
Lisa DeRiviere	9

==== B Event ====
Semifinals			Final
			1	Deb McCreanor	6
2	Melanie Hanke Dickenson	4		Terry Ursel	7
3	Terry Ursel	8

=== Interlake ===
The Interlake Regional Playdowns took place from December 17 to 18, 2011, at the Winnipeg Curling Club in Winnipeg Beach. The event qualified two teams to the provincial playdowns.

==== A Event ====
Semifinals
1	Kim Link	7
4	Allison Anderson	5
3	Kelsey Boettcher	7
2	Karen Rosser	6

Final
Kim Link	5
Kelsey Boettcher	8

==== B Event ====
Semifinals			Final
			1	Kim Link	7
2	Allison Anderson	4		Karen Rosser	5
3	Karen Rosser	6

=== Norman ===
The Norman Regional Playdowns took place from December 17 to 18, 2011, at The Pas Curling Club in The Pas. The event qualified one team to the provincial playdowns.

A1	B1	Final
	Lori Forbes
Judy Peterson	Judy Peterson
Lori Forbes

=== Parkland ===
The Parkland Regional Playdowns took place from December 17 to 18, 2011, at the Dauphin Curling Club in Dauphin. The event qualified one team to the provincial playdowns.

A1		B1		Final
		Leanne Urbanovitch	5
Lisa Menard	10	Lisa Menard	8
Leanne Urbanovitch	1			Lisa Menard
				Lisa Menard

=== Westman ===
The Westman Regional Playdowns took place from December 17 to 18, 2011, at the Brandon Curling Club in Brandon. The event qualified two teams to the provincial playdowns.

==== A Event ====
Semifinals
1	Liza Park	10
4	Karyn Robertson	1
3	Betty Buurma	3
2	Kelsey Russill	11

Final
Liza Park	13
Kelsey Russill	4

==== B Event ====
Semifinals		Final
		1	Kelsey Russill	9
2	Karyn Robertson		Betty Buurma	4
3	Betty Buurma

=== Winnipeg ===
The Winnipeg Regional Playdowns took place from December 16 to 18, 2011, at the Victoria Curling Club in Winnipeg. The event qualified three teams to the provincial playdowns.

==== A Event ====
A Event
Meghan Armit	4
Lori Pelissier	7
Alyssa Vanderpoele	8
Jennifer Sande	1

Semifinals
Lori Pelissier	5
Joelle Brown	9
Alyssa Vanderpoele	7
Jill Thurston	8

To A Final
Joelle Brown	3
Jill Thurston	6

A Event
Jackie Komyshyn	11
D'arcy Maywood	3

Semifinals
Jackie Komyshyn	8
Darcy Robertson	7
Tracy Igonia	5
Janet Harvey	8

To A Final
Jackie Komyshyn	2
Janet Harvey	8
Final
Jill Thurston	6
Janet Harvey	3

==== B Event ====
B Qualifier 1		Semifinals		Final
				Janet Harvey	9
D'arcy Maywood	6			Alyssa Vanderpoele	7
Alyssa Vanderpoele	7	Alyssa Vanderpoele	9
Tracy Igonia	7	Tracy Igonia	5
Meghan Armit	3

B Qualifier 2		Semifinals		Final
		Lori Pelissier	8
Lori Pelissier	11	Jackie Komyshyn	10
Jennifer Sande	4			Jackie Komyshyn	2
				Darcy Robertson	9
		Darcy Robertson	7
		Joelle Brown	6

=== Eastman ===
The Eastman Regional Playdowns were scheduled to be held from December 17 to 18, 2011, at the Ste. Anne Curling Club in Ste. Anne. There were no entries for this event, and, as a result, an extra berth was awarded to the Interlake Region.
