= 2009 Manitoba Lotteries Women's Curling Classic =

- Host city: Winnipeg, Manitoba
- Arena: Fort Rouge Curling Club
- Dates: October 23-26
- Winner: Team Scott
- Curling club: Kelowna CC, Kelowna, BC
- Skip: Kelly Scott
- Third: Jeanna Schraeder
- Second: Sasha Carter
- Lead: Jacquie Armstrong
- Finalist: Team Jones

The 2009 Manitoba Lotteries Women's Curling Classic was held October 23-26 at the Fort Rouge Curling Club in Winnipeg, Manitoba. It was the second Grand Slam event of the 2009-2010 women's World Curling Tour.

The event was previously known as the Casinos of Winnipeg Women's Curling Classic. The event featured 32 teams, 30 of which are from Canada and two from Europe. The total purse for the event was $60,000 with $15,000 going to the winning team.

== Teams ==
Skip	Third	Second	Lead	City
Sherry Anderson	Kim Hodson	Heather Walsh	Donna Gignac	Delisle, Saskatchewan
Ève Bélisle	Brenda Nicholls	Martine Comeau	Julie Rainville	Montreal, Quebec
Cheryl Bernard	Susan O'Connor	Carolyn Darbyshire	Cori Bartel	Calgary, Alberta
Lisa Blixhavn	Lana Hunter	Rhonda Ritchie	Tanya Enns	Winnipeg, Manitoba
Patti Burtnyk	Heather Pierson	Kim Horne	Marnie Omichinski	Winnipeg, Manitoba
Chelsea Carey	Kari White	Kristen Foster	Lindsay Titheridge	Winnipeg, Manitoba
Michelle Englot	Deanna Doig	Roberta Materi	Cindy Simmons	Regina, Saskatchewan
Kerri Flett	Janice Blair	Susan Baleja	Alison Harvey	Winnipeg, Manitoba
Janet Harvey	Cherie-Ann Loder	Kristin Loder	Carey Kirby	Winnipeg, Manitoba
Amber Holland	Kim Schneider	Tammy Schneider	Heather Seeley	Kronau, Saskatchewan
Kristy Jenion	Brette Richards	Cheryl Neufeld	Jillian Sandison	Winnipeg, Manitoba
Jennifer Jones	Cathy Overton-Clapham	Jill Officer	Dawn Askin	Winnipeg, Manitoba
Cathy King	Kaitlyn Lawes	Raylene Rocque	Tracy Bush	Edmonton, Alberta
Marie-France Larouche	Nancy Bélanger	Annie Lemay	Joëlle Sabourin	Saint-Romuald, Quebec
Kim Link	Colleen Kilgallen	Pam Kolton	Renee Fletcher	Winnipeg, Manitoba
Jenna Loder	Elisabeth Peters	Sarah Wazney	Mary Jane McKenzie	Winnipeg, Manitoba
Marla Mallett	Grace MacInnes	Diane Gushulak	Jacalyn Brown	Vancouver, British Columbia
Krista McCarville	Tara George	Kari MacLean	Lorraine Lang	Thunder Bay, Ontario
Heather Nedohin	Beth Iskiw	Jessica Mair	Pam Appelman	Edmonton, Alberta
Anette Norberg	Eva Lund	Cathrine Lindahl	Anna Svard	Härnösand, Sweden
Mirjam Ott	Carmen Schäfer	Carmen Küng	Janine Greiner	Davos, Switzerland
Karen Porritt	Calleen Neufeld	Lisa DeRiviere	Jolene Rutter	Winnipeg, Manitoba
Heather Rankin	Lisa Eyamie	Heather Jensen	Kyla MacLachlan	Calgary, Alberta
Jo-Ann Rizzo	Christina Cadorin	Lee Merklinger	Leigh Armstrong	Brantford, Ontario
Holly Scott	Tara Scott	Jasmine Bracken	Jenna Scott	Winnipeg, Manitoba
Kelly Scott	Jeanna Schraeder	Sasha Carter	Jacquie Armstrong	Kelowna, British Columbia
Barb Spencer	Darcy Robertson	Vanessa Foster	Barb Enright	Winnipeg, Manitoba
Linda Stewart	Jan Sandison	Tammy Schoenrath	Jennifer Clark-Rouire	Winnipeg, Manitoba
Shauna Streich	Karen Klein	Lesle Cafferty	Sue McCambridge	Winnipeg, Manitoba
Heather Strong	Cathy Cunningham	Laura Strong	Peg Goss	St. John's, Newfoundland and Labrador
Jill Thurston	Kristen Phillips	Leslie Wilson	Raunora Westcott	Winnipeg, Manitoba
Crystal Webster	Lori Olson-Johns	Samantha Preston	Stephanie Malekoff	Calgary, Alberta

== Results ==
=== A Event ===
Round of 16
(Manitoba) Holly Scott	6
(Alberta) Crystal Webster	5
(Manitoba) Jill Thurston	2
(Saskatchewan) Michelle Englot	5
(Manitoba) Chelsea Carey	6
(Quebec) Ève Bélisle	2
(Manitoba) Linda Stewart	4
(Alberta) Cheryl Bernard	5
(Manitoba) Kerri Flett	3
(Ontario) Krista McCarville	7
(Manitoba) Kim Link	4
(British Columbia) Kelly Scott	7
(Alberta) Heather Nedohin	5
(Newfoundland and Labrador) Heather Strong	3
(Manitoba) Lisa Blixhavn	4
(Quebec) Marie-France Larouche	5

Quarterfinals
(Manitoba) Holly Scott	9
(Saskatchewan) Michelle Englot	2
(Manitoba) Chelsea Carey	2
(Alberta) Cheryl Bernard	5
(Ontario) Krista McCarville	3
(British Columbia) Kelly Scott	6
(Alberta) Heather Nedohin	3
(Quebec) Marie-France Larouche	9

Semifinals
(Manitoba) Holly Scott	3
(Alberta) Cheryl Bernard	6
(British Columbia) Kelly Scott	6
(Quebec) Marie-France Larouche	5

Qualifier 1
(Alberta) Cheryl Bernard	7
(British Columbia) Kelly Scott	9

Round of 16
(Manitoba) Kristy Jenion	4
(Saskatchewan) Amber Holland	6
(Manitoba) Shauna Streich	7
(Sweden) Anette Norberg	4
(Ontario) Jo-Ann Rizzo	4
(Manitoba) Barb Spencer	11
(Switzerland) Mirjam Ott	4
(Manitoba) Karen Porritt	7
(Manitoba) Jenna Loder	4
(British Columbia) Marla Mallett	8
(Manitoba) Janet Harvey	3
(Alberta) Heather Rankin	6
(Alberta) Cathy King	7
(Saskatchewan) Sherry Anderson	5
(Manitoba) Patti Burtnyk	2
(Manitoba) Jennifer Jones	4

Quarterfinals
(Saskatchewan) Amber Holland	5
(Manitoba) Shauna Streich	4
(Manitoba) Barb Spencer	5
(Manitoba) Karen Porritt	6
(British Columbia) Marla Mallett	3
(Alberta) Heather Rankin	8
(Alberta) Cathy King	3
(Manitoba) Jennifer Jones	10

Semifinals
(Saskatchewan) Amber Holland	7
(Manitoba) Karen Porritt	3
(Alberta) Heather Rankin	6
(Manitoba) Jennifer Jones	8

Qualifier 2
(Saskatchewan) Amber Holland	4
(Manitoba) Jennifer Jones	5

=== B Event ===
Round of 16
(Alberta) Crystal Webster	5
(Manitoba) Jill Thurston	6
(Quebec) Ève Bélisle	7
(Manitoba) Linda Stewart	5
(Manitoba) Kerri Flett	7
(Manitoba) Kim Link	6
(Newfoundland and Labrador) Heather Strong	4
(Manitoba) Lisa Blixhavn	6

Quarterfinals
(Manitoba) Jill Thurston	5
(Quebec) Ève Bélisle	4
(Manitoba) Kerri Flett	5
(Manitoba) Lisa Blixhavn	6

Semifinals
(Manitoba) Jill Thurston	3
(Manitoba) Karen Porritt	7
(Manitoba) Lisa Blixhavn	4
(Alberta) Heather Rankin	3

Finals
(Manitoba) Karen Porritt	3
(Manitoba) Lisa Blixhavn	4

Quarterfinals
(Manitoba) Shauna Streich	2
(Manitoba) Barb Spencer	7
(British Columbia) Marla Mallett	4
(Alberta) Cathy King	5

Semifinals
(Manitoba) Barb Spencer	2
(Alberta) Cathy King	8

Finals
(Alberta) Cathy King	1
(Alberta) Cheryl Bernard	4
Qualifier 3
(Manitoba) Lisa Blixhavn	1
(Alberta) Cheryl Bernard	5

Round of 16
(Manitoba) Patti Burtnyk	5
(Saskatchewan) Sherry Anderson	7
(Manitoba) Janet Harvey	5
(Manitoba) Jenna Loder	4
(Switzerland) Mirjam Ott	6
(Ontario) Jo-Ann Rizzo	3
(Sweden) Anette Norberg	7
(Manitoba) Kristy Jenion	6

Quarterfinals
(Saskatchewan) Sherry Anderson
(Manitoba) Janet Harvey
(Switzerland) Mirjam Ott	7
(Sweden) Anette Norberg	4

Semifinals
(Manitoba) Janet Harvey	4
(Quebec) Marie-France Larouche	3
(Switzerland) Mirjam Ott	7
(Manitoba) Holly Scott	2

Finals
(Manitoba) Janet Harvey	3
(Switzerland) Mirjam Ott	10

Quarterfinals
(Saskatchewan) Michelle Englot	7
(Manitoba) Chelsea Carey	1
(Ontario) Krista McCarville	5
(Alberta) Heather Nedohin	4

Semifinals
(Saskatchewan) Michelle Englot	4
(Ontario) Krista McCarville	9

Finals
(Saskatchewan) Amber Holland	4
(Ontario) Krista McCarville	6
Qualifier 4
(Switzerland) Mirjam Ott	4
(Ontario) Krista McCarville	7

=== C Event ===
Round of 16
(Alberta) Crystal Webster	3
(Manitoba) Linda Stewart	6

Quarterfinals
(Saskatchewan) Michelle Englot	4
(Manitoba) Linda Stewart	6
(Manitoba) Holly Scott	3
(Quebec) Marie-France Larouche	4

Semifinals
(Manitoba) Linda Stewart	4
(Quebec) Marie-France Larouche	5

Qualifier 5
(Quebec) Marie-France Larouche	6
(Manitoba) Lisa Blixhavn	4

Round of 16
(Ontario) Kim Link	7
(Newfoundland and Labrador) Heather Strong	4
(Quebec) Ève Bélisle	7
(Manitoba) Kerri Flett	8

Quarterfinals
(Manitoba) Kim Link	6
(Manitoba) Shauna Streich	3
(British Columbia) Marla Mallett	8
(Manitoba) Kerri Flett	5

Semifinals
(Manitoba) Kim Link	4
(Saskatchewan) Amber Holland	6
(British Columbia) Marla Mallett	6
(Manitoba) Janet Harvey	7

Qualifier 6
(Saskatchewan) Amber Holland	10
(Manitoba) Janet Harvey	3

Round of 16
(Sweden) Anette Norberg	2
(Saskatchewan) Sherry Anderson	8
(Manitoba) Kristy Jenion	6
(Ontario) Jo-Ann Rizzo	5

Quarterfinals
(Saskatchewan) Sherry Anderson	6
(Manitoba) Chelsea Carey	3
(Alberta) Heather Nedohin	7
(Manitoba) Kristy Jenion	1

Semifinals
(Saskatchewan) Sherry Anderson	3
(Manitoba) Karen Porritt	5
(Alberta) Heather Nedohin	4
(Alberta) Cathy King	3

Qualifier 7
(Manitoba) Karen Porritt	4
(Alberta) Heather Nedohin	6

Round of 16
(Manitoba) Patti Burtnyk	8
(Manitoba) Jenna Loder	1

Quarterfinals
(Manitoba) Barb Spencer	8
(Manitoba) Patti Burtnyk	0
(Manitoba) Jill Thurston	3
(Alberta) Heather Rankin	7

Semifinals
(Alberta) Heather Rankin	5
(Manitoba) Barb Spencer	6

Qualifier 8
(Manitoba) Barb Spencer	6
(Switzerland) Mirjam Ott	3

=== Playoffs ===
Quarterfinals
(British Columbia) Kelly Scott	7
(Saskatchewan) Amber Holland	3
(Alberta) Heather Nedohin	5
(Alberta) Cheryl Bernard	3
(Manitoba) Jennifer Jones	7
(Quebec) Marie-France Larouche	5
(Manitoba) Barb Spencer	3
(Ontario) Krista McCarville	6

Semifinals
(British Columbia) Kelly Scott	6
(Alberta) Heather Nedohin	5
(Manitoba) Jennifer Jones	4
(Ontario) Krista McCarville	2

Finals
(British Columbia) Kelly Scott	5
(Manitoba) Jennifer Jones	4

== Sources ==
- WCT Event site
