= Chelsea Carey =

Canadian curler (born 1984)

- Curler
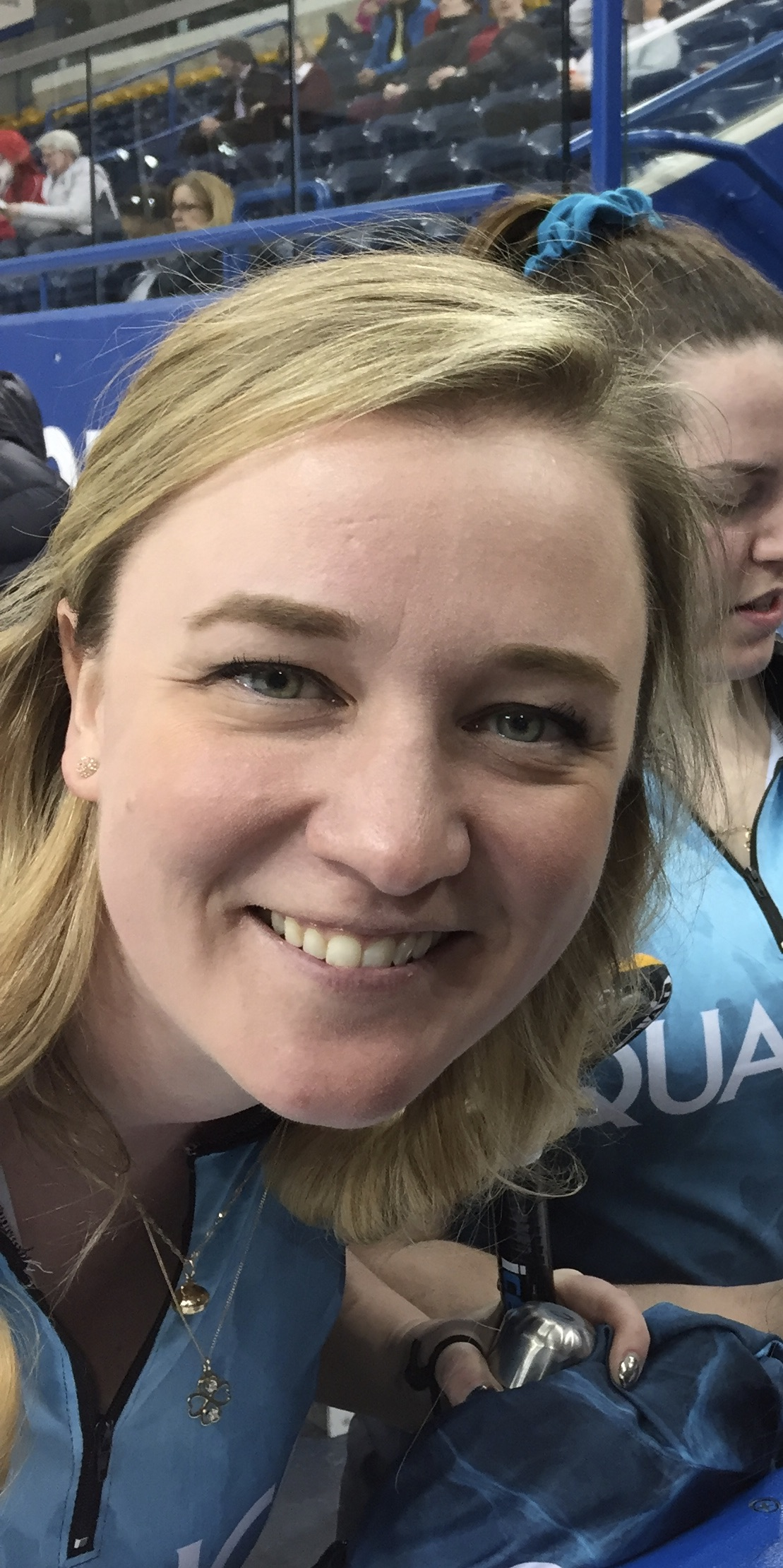
- Carey in April 2019
- Born: Chelsea Danielle Carey; September 12, 1984 (age 42); Winnipeg, Manitoba, Canada

Team
- Curling club: The Glencoe Club, Calgary, AB

Curling career
- Member Association: Manitoba (2000–2014; 2021; 2022–present); Alberta (2014–2020); Saskatchewan (2021–2022)
- Hearts: 7 (2014, 2016, 2017, 2019, 2020, 2021, 2022)
- World Championship: 2 (2016, 2019)
- Top CTRS ranking: 3rd (2017–18)
- Grand Slam victories: 2 (2010 Manitoba Lotteries Women's Curling Classic, 2018 Canadian Open)
Medal record
Women's curling
Representing Canada
Scotties Tournament of Hearts
Bronze medal – third place	2017 St. Catharines
Representing Alberta
Canadian Olympic Curling Trials
Silver medal – second place	2017 Ottawa
Silver medal – second place	2021 Saskatoon
Scotties Tournament of Hearts
Gold medal – first place	2016 Grande Prairie
Gold medal – first place	2019 Sydney
Canadian Mixed Doubles Championship
Bronze medal – third place	2017 Saskatoon
Bronze medal – third place	2018 Leduc
Representing Manitoba
Scotties Tournament of Hearts
Bronze medal – third place	2014 Montreal

Chelsea Danielle Carey (born September 12, 1984 in Winnipeg, Manitoba) is a Canadian curler from Calgary, Alberta. She currently skips her own team out of Manitoba. She is the 2016 and 2019 Canadian and Alberta women's champion skip and 2014 Manitoba provincial women's champion skip. She currently coaches the Beth Peterson rink.

== Career ==
=== Earlier career ===
Carey curled in six provincial junior championships, but did not win the event. She did win the 2000 Juvenile Provincial championship, which she followed up with a silver medal at the 2001 Canadian Juvenile championship. She was also the Manitoba high school provincial champion in 2002.

Carey has won a number of World Curling Tour (WCT) events including the 2005 Manitoba Lotteries Wheat City Curling Classic, the 2006 Interlake Pharmacy Classic (playing third for Barb Spencer in both events), and the Interlake Pharmacy Classic again in 2009, culminating with winning the 2009 Manitoba Curling Tour Championship.

In October 2010 Carey skipped her team to their first Grand Slam victory. Carey defeated Cathy Overton-Clapham 7–3 at the Fort Rouge Curling Club in Winnipeg, Manitoba to claim first place at the 2010 Manitoba Lotteries Women's Curling Classic. That season, she won one other WCT event, the 2011 DEKALB Superspiel.

2011 saw the Carey rink emerge onto the national stage during the 2011-2012 curling season. In December 2011 Carey emerged victorious in the Manitoba Curling Tour (MCT) Championships in Morris, Manitoba. Her rink overcame an early round robin loss, winning five games in a row to reach the finals where they defeated Kim Link 6–4. This came on the heels of a second-place finish in the 2011 Canada Cup of Curling in Cranbrook, B.C., where Carey's rink lost the final 9–4 to Jennifer Jones in what was the first national television appearance for Carey and her team. That season, Carey won one WCT event, the 2012 Victoria Curling Classic Invitational. With 95.7 CTRS points, Carey and her team finished 6th in 2011-2012 CTRS points In recognition of their strong season, Carey's rink was named the 2011 World Curling Tour Breakthrough Team of the Year.

In 2012-2013 Carey and her team continued their strong play, placing second in the Colonial Square Ladies Classic and continuing to play well through the early part of the season winning the 2012 Red Deer Curling Classic by defeating Jennifer Jones 7–3 in the final. They followed this with another finals appearance two weeks later in the ROGERS Masters of Curling in Brantford, Ontario being defeated 8–3 in the final by Rachel Homan and also collected a 3rd-place finish in the Pomeroy Inn & Suites Prairie Showdown en route to accumulating 136.0 CTRS points in the 2012-2013 curling season, good for a 5th-place finish in the standings.

Carey has twice come extremely close to winning a Manitoba provincial women's championship. She lost the 2011 Manitoba Scotties Tournament of Hearts final to Cathy Overton-Clapham after going 7–0 in the round robin. She again made the finals of the 2012 Manitoba Scotties Tournament of Hearts after going 5–2 in the round robin. This was the closest Carey had come to winning a provincial championship, losing the final 6–5 on a last rock thrown by Jennifer Jones. At the 2013 Manitoba Scotties Tournament of Hearts, her team placed fourth.

=== 2013–14 gains and Manitoba Scotties Championship success ===
The consistent performance by Carey and her team from 2011 to 2013 allowed them to accumulate enough CTRS points to qualify as a direct entry to the 2013 Tim Hortons Roar of the Rings, the Canadian Olympic Curling Trials held in Carey's home town of Winnipeg, Manitoba in December 2013. The victorious team would represent Canada at the 2014 Olympic Games in Sochi, Russia. At the Olympic Trials the team competed to a 4–3 record, setting up a tie breaker game against Sherry Middaugh, but would lose resulting in a fourth-place finish.

January 2014 brought yet another opportunity for Carey and her squad consisting of lead Lindsay Titheridge, second Kristen Foster, and third Kristy McDonald to chase a Manitoba provincial women's curling championship at the 2014 Scotties Tournament of Hearts in Virden, Manitoba. Carey and her rink came in as the first seed in the tournament, with team Jennifer Jones absent in preparation for their own play in the 2014 Sochi Winter Olympic Games. Carey and her team finished the round robin 5–2, an identical record to veteran skip Darcy Robertson, setting up a tie-breaker game with Robertson for the right to enter the playoffs.

Carey and her rink prevailed over Darcy Robertson 7–3 in the tie-breaker game, advancing to the 2 vs. 2 playoff game against another Manitoba Scotties veteran, Janet Harvey. The team won that game 8-2 advancing them to the semi-final where they again won to go on and play in the final. The semi-final brought Carey a small measure of revenge, as Barb Spencer had eliminated Carey from the Manitoba Scotties playoffs the previous year. This was the third Manitoba Provincial Scotties Final in the last four years for the Carey rink. In the final Carey and her team won 6–2 over Kerri Einarson, running her out of rocks in the 10th end. This clinched their first Manitoba Provincial Scotties Championship and the right to represent Manitoba at the 2014 Scotties Tournament of Hearts in Montreal, Quebec.

At the 2014 Scotties Tournament of Hearts in Montreal Team Carey won the bronze after going 9-2 during round robin play. They lost the 1 vs. 2 Page playoff game against defending and eventual repeat champion Rachel Homan and then beat Saskatchewan's Stefanie Lawton in the bronze medal game. Following the event, the team decided to mutually part ways as some of her teammates were starting families. MacDonald formed a new team for the 2014–2015 season and Carey announced a move to Edmonton to skip a rink composed of Laura Crocker at third, Taylor McDonald at second, and Jen Gates at lead.

Carey's first World Curling Tour event after forming her new team was the 2014 HDF Insurance Shoot-Out, which they won. However, the team struggled to gel during the season, alternating between flashes of promise (including winning the 2014 Boundary Ford Curling Classic) and inconsistency. Despite some drama, they put together a strong run at the 2015 Alberta Scotties. Carey, known for her hitting and ability to throw big weight, had a unique metal slider that she had been wearing her entire curling career stolen from the dressing rooms in Lacombe, Alberta. Despite this significant setback and change to her equipment in the middle of the provincial playdowns, Carey battled through to the final, but fell to eventual repeat champion Val Sweeting.

In the spring of 2015 Carey's team dumped her in favour of Kelsey Rocque who had played with Taylor McDonald in the junior and CIS ranks, With Rocque graduating from junior curling and taking over the team, Carey was left in the lurch, seeking a new team.

Two-time Canadian Women's Champion Heather Nedohin whom Carey had defeated in the 2015 Alberta Scotties semi-final had decided to take a step back from elite curling to focus more on her family. Nedohin's rink consisting of third Amy Nixon, second Jocelyn Peterman and lead Laine Peters decided as a group to bring Carey on as skip, hoping to continue their winning ways. In their first season together, the team made the final of the Curler's Corner Autumn Gold Classic, beating Val Sweeting in the semi-final, but eventually losing the final to Rachel Homan. After turning in a solid season on the world curling tour, Carey avenged her 2015 Alberta Scotties final loss by defeating Team Sweeting at the 2016 Alberta Scotties Tournament of Hearts to earn the right to represent Alberta in the 2016 Scotties Tournament of Hearts in Grande Prairie, Alberta.

=== First Canadian Championship ===
Carey and her rink had a strong round robin, posting a 9–2 record to claim first place in the round robin, winning a tie-break because of their 12–5 win over Jennifer Jones and Team Canada on the opening day of tournament. Carey played Jones as Team Alberta and Team Canada squared off in the 1 vs 2 page playoff game. Carey and her team controlled the bulk of the game, emerging victorious with a 7–5 win, with Carey shooting 96% in the game. This vaulted Carey and Team Alberta into the final, where they faced Northern Ontario's Krista McCarville. It was a tight, back and forth game tied 6–6 in the 10th end. Ultimately it came down to Carey's final stone, which she used to draw the back 4 foot for a single point sealing a 7–6 victory to claim the national title. Carey and her team represented Team Canada at the 2016 Ford World Women's Curling Championship in Swift Current, Saskatchewan. After finishing the round robin with an 8–3 record, the team lost both of their playoff matches, settling for 4th place.

Carey and her rink began the 2016–17 season by winning the inaugural Hokkaido Bank Curling Classic in August 2016, which would be her only tour victory of the season. As defending champions, they represented Team Canada at the 2017 Scotties Tournament of Hearts. There, she led the team to a 9-2 round robin record, which got them third place. In the playoffs, they first played Northern Ontario's Krista McCarville rink in the 3 vs. 4 game. They lost 8–1 to Northern Ontario, which put them in the bronze medal game. After Northern Ontario lost their semifinal game, the two teams would face each other in a rematch for the bronze medal. This time Carey would prevail, leading her team to a 7–4 win. Following the season, Amy Nixon left the team and was replaced with veteran third Cathy Overton-Clapham.

Carey began the 2017-18 curling season with a mixed doubles tour win with partner Colin Hodgson at the Canad Inns Mixed Doubles Championship. Her four-player team played in the 2017 Canadian Olympic Curling Trials in Ottawa, and were undefeated in round robin play, which gave them a direct berth to the final. There, she faced off against the hometown Rachel Homan rink, losing the game 6–5. The next month, the team lost in both of their playoff matches at the 2018 Alberta Scotties Tournament of Hearts and were eliminated from winning a provincial title. However, they rebounded the next week by winning the 2018 Meridian Canadian Open Grand Slam event.

Despite losing in the Alberta provincials, they earned enough CTRS points during the season to put them into the first Scotties Tournament of Hearts play-in game at the 2018 Hearts. They lost the wild card game to Kerri Einarson, failing to qualify for the Scotties. In mixed doubles play, Carey and Hogdson made it to the semifinal of the 2018 Canadian Mixed Doubles Curling Championship.

=== New team (2018–20) ===
At the end of the season, the Carey rink broke up, and Carey formed a new team with Sarah Wilkes, Dana Ferguson and Rachelle Brown, playing out of The Glencoe Club in Calgary. Leading up to Alberta provincials, the team had two playoff appearances at Grand Slam of Curling events including a semifinal finish at the Masters. Team Carey qualified for the 2019 Alberta Scotties Tournament of Hearts as the CTRS leaders from the tour season. They qualified for the playoffs as the "A Qualifier" after defeating Casey Scheidegger's rink 7–2. They defeated the Kelsey Rocque rink in the A vs. B playoff game 10–2 and would go on to beat them in the final 8–3 after Carey made a double for four in the ninth end. Representing Alberta at the 2019 Scotties Tournament of Hearts, they went 7–0 through the round robin and finished the championship pool with a 9–2 record which made them the number one seed going into the playoffs. Alberta defeated Saskatchewan's Robyn Silvernagle rink in the 1 vs. 2 game 11–7 and would face Ontario's Rachel Homan rink in the final. Team Carey made history when they came back from a 1–5 deficit to win the championship 8–6 with a total of five stolen points and two missed draws by Homan in the 10th and 11th ends. At the 2019 World Women's Curling Championship, the team struggled and were the first Canadian women's team not to make the playoffs at the championship in twenty years. They finished the season with a quarterfinal finish at the 2019 Players' Championship and by missing the playoffs at the 2019 Champions Cup.

Team Carey did not have a strong start to the Grand Slam season, only making the playoffs at one of the first four events, the National. They had a strong week at the 2019 Canada Cup going 4–2 through the round robin, qualifying for the playoffs. In the semifinal, they lost to the Tracy Fleury rink 9–4. Carey quoted it was a "tough last couple of events so it was definitely a positive week overall." At the 2020 Scotties Tournament of Hearts, Carey led Team Canada to a 5–6 record, missing the playoffs and settling for seventh place. It would be the team's last event of the season as both the Players' Championship and the Champions Cup Grand Slam events were cancelled due to the COVID-19 pandemic. On March 13, 2020, Wilkes announced she would be parting ways with the team. Three days later, both Ferguson and Brown announced they would be leaving and the team officially disbanded.

=== Team Fleury (2020–21) ===
Without a team for the 2020–21 season, Carey decided to focus on mixed doubles curling with her partner Colin Hodgson. She would, however, participate in the 2021 Scotties Tournament of Hearts, skipping Tracy Fleury's team out of the East St. Paul Curling Club as Fleury wanted to stay home with her baby daughter, who was diagnosed with infantile spasms, a rare form of epilepsy. At the Hearts, Carey led the team to a 6–6 eighth-place finish. Fleury returned to skip the team at the 2021 Champions Cup, held in the same Calgary bubble in April 2021. There, Fleury led her team to the semifinals where they lost to Switzerland's Silvana Tirinzoni. Fleury left the bubble after the event, and Carey stepped in once again to skip the team, this time for the 2021 Players' Championship. There, Carey led the team to a 2–3 round robin record, missing the playoffs.

=== Move to Saskatchewan (2021–22) ===
On May 19, 2021, it was announced that Carey would move to Saskatchewan to skip the team of Jolene Campbell, Stephanie Schmidt, Jennifer Armstrong and Rachel Erickson for the 2021–22 season. The new Team Carey found success in just their second event together, going undefeated to claim the Craven SPORTS Services Curling Classic tour event title. They then made the semifinals of the 2021 Curlers Corner Autumn Gold Curling Classic where they were eliminated by Tabitha Peterson. At the event, however, they were able to defeat the likes of Rachel Homan, Jennifer Jones and Jamie Sinclair en route to the semifinals. They earned two more playoff appearances at the Boundary Ford Curling Classic and the SaskTour Women's Moose Jaw where they reached the quarterfinals and semifinals respectively.

Carey herself had to miss out on competing in the Red Deer Curling Classic with her team as she slotted in as Team Tracy Fleury's alternate for the 2021 Canadian Olympic Curling Trials, held November 20 to 28 in Saskatoon, Saskatchewan. Carey hoped to compete in the Trials with her own team but was excluded from doing so after Curling Canada had to modify the qualification process due to the pandemic. Through the round robin, the team went undefeated with a perfect 8–0 record, becoming only the second women's rink to do so following Carey's team in 2017. This earned them a bye to the Olympic Trials final where they would face Team Jennifer Jones, who they previously defeated in their final round robin game. The team began the game with hammer, but immediately gave up a stolen point. They eventually tied the game after four ends, and later after seven ends 4–4. After a blank in the eighth, Team Fleury earned their first lead of the game with a steal of one in the ninth. In the tenth end, Jennifer Jones had an open hit-and-stick to win the game, however, her shooter rolled two far and she only got one. This sent the game to an extra end where Team Fleury would hold the hammer. On her final shot, Fleury attempted a soft-weight hit on a Jones stone partially buried behind a guard. Her rock, however, curled too much and hit the guard, giving up a steal of one and the game to Team Jones. Team Fleury earned the silver medal from the event, making it Carey's second silver medal at the Canadian Olympic Trials.

Back together, Team Carey had a semifinal finish at the DeKalb Superspiel in December 2021. Their next event was the 2022 Saskatchewan Scotties Tournament of Hearts, which they entered as the top ranked team. Team Carey qualified through the A-side of the tournament with a perfect 3–0 record. This earned them a spot in the 1 vs. 2 page playoff game where they defeated Penny Barker. In the final, they once again faced the Barker rink. This time, Team Barker would win the match 7–5, despite Team Carey beating them in both the A Final and 1 vs. 2 page playoff game. Despite this, they still qualified for the 2022 Scotties Tournament of Hearts as Wild Card #2 after Curling Canada used the same format from the 2021 event. At the championship, the team finished with a 4–4 round robin record, not advancing to the playoff round. Team Carey wrapped up their season at the 2022 Players' Championship where they missed the playoffs.

On April 3, 2022, the team announced that they would be disbanding at the end of the 2021–22 season. Carey, Campbell and Erickson later announced that they would be staying together and adding Liz Fyfe, Team Fleury's former second, to the team for the 2022–23 season. The team also added U.S. curler Jamie Sinclair as their alternate with Sinclair's dual citizenship allowing her to play in Canada.

=== Back to Manitoba (2022–present) ===
Curling out of Manitoba, the new Carey rink had a strong start to the season, reaching the semifinals of the 2022 Martensville International. After qualifying as the fourth seeds for the 2022 PointsBet Invitational, the team lost their opening game to thirteenth ranked Selena Sturmay and were eliminated. In Grand Slam play, Team Carey played in three events, only qualifying at the 2022 Masters where they lost in the quarterfinals to Kerri Einarson. At the 2023 Manitoba Scotties Tournament of Hearts, the team lost their first two games and never recovered, finishing 1–4 and failing to reach the championship round. Shortly following the provincial championship, the team announced they would be disbanding. Carey herself still had one event to play as she spared for Casey Scheidegger at the 2023 Players' Championship. There, she led the team to a 1–4 record, defeating Rachel Homan in their sole victory.

Without a team for the 2023–24 season, Carey took on the role of "super spare" for both the Jennifer Jones and Michèle Jäggi rinks. For Jones, she led the trio of Karlee Burgess, Emily Zacharias and Lauren Lenentine to two second place finishes at the 2023 Saville Shootout and the Stu Sells 1824 Halifax Classic, losing the finals to Heather Nedohin (skipping Team Homan) and Silvana Tirinzoni respectively. With Team Jäggi, she played in four events. The team had two quarterfinal finishes at the 2023 Oslo Cup and the 2023 Curlers Corner Autumn Gold Curling Classic with Carey skipping the team at the latter. She also spared for Kate Cameron at the 2024 Canadian Open Slam event, leading her team to an 0–4 record.

Halfway through the 2024-25 season, Karlee Burgess announced that she would be leaving the Carey team to pursue other opportunities, and soon after the team formally disbanded.

== Personal life ==
Carey is the daughter of former Brier champion Dan Carey who won playing third for Vic Peters in 1992. She posed for both the 2011 and the 2017 "Women of Curling Calendar". She has a Bachelor of Commerce from the University of Manitoba and previously worked as a marketing representative for Sealy Canada. In 2014, Carey helped to raise awareness of the disease ALS by participating in the Ice Bucket Challenge. She currently works as a development and communications manager for KidSport Alberta.

== Grand Slam record ==
Key
C	Champion
F	Lost in Final
SF	Lost in Semifinal
QF	Lost in Quarterfinals
R16	Lost in the round of 16
Q	Did not advance to playoffs
T2	Played in Tier 2 event
DNP	Did not participate in event
N/A	Not a Grand Slam event that season

Event	2006–07	2007–08	2008–09	2009–10	2010–11	2011–12	2012–13	2013–14	2014–15	2015–16	2016–17	2017–18	2018–19	2019–20	2020–21	2021–22	2022–23	2023–24	2024–25
Tour Challenge	N/A	N/A	N/A	N/A	N/A	N/A	N/A	N/A	N/A	Q	Q	T2	Q	Q	N/A	N/A	Q	T2 (Note: Carey spared on Team Michèle Jäggi who only had three players.)	Q
Canadian Open	N/A	N/A	N/A	N/A	N/A	N/A	N/A	N/A	QF	SF	Q	C	QF	Q	N/A	N/A	DNP	Q (Note: Carey spared for Kate Cameron.)	QF
The National	N/A	N/A	N/A	N/A	N/A	N/A	N/A	N/A	N/A	Q	QF	SF	Q	QF	N/A	DNP	Q	DNP	Q
Masters	N/A	N/A	N/A	N/A	N/A	N/A	F	Q	Q	DNP	QF	DNP	SF	Q	N/A	DNP	QF	DNP	DNP
Players'	DNP	DNP	DNP	Q	QF	Q	Q	DNP	DNP	Q	DNP	Q	QF	N/A	Q (Note: Carey spared for Tracy Fleury.)	Q	Q (Note: Carey spared for Casey Scheidegger.)	DNP	DNP
Champions Cup	N/A	N/A	N/A	N/A	N/A	N/A	N/A	N/A	N/A	Q	DNP	QF	Q	N/A	DNP	DNP	DNP	N/A	N/A

=== Former events ===
Event	2006–07	2007–08	2008–09	2009–10	2010–11	2011–12	2012–13	2013–14	2014–15	2015–16	2016–17	2017–18	2018–19
Elite 10	N/A	N/A	N/A	N/A	N/A	N/A	N/A	N/A	N/A	N/A	N/A	N/A	Q
Autumn Gold	Q	DNP	DNP	Q	Q	Q	Q	Q	Q	N/A	N/A	N/A	N/A
Manitoba Liquor & Lotteries	Q	Q	Q	Q	C	Q	Q	Q	N/A	N/A	N/A	N/A	N/A
Colonial Square	N/A	N/A	N/A	N/A	N/A	N/A	F	Q	DNP	N/A	N/A	N/A	N/A
Sobeys Slam	N/A	DNP	DNP	N/A	F	N/A	N/A	N/A	N/A	N/A	N/A	N/A	N/A

== Teams ==
Season	Skip	Third	Second	Lead	Events
2005–06	Barb Spencer	Chelsea Carey	Kim Keizer	Barb Mehling	2006 MBSTOH
2006–07	Barb Spencer	Chelsea Carey	Kristin Napier	Barb Mehling	2007 MBSTOH
2007–08	Chelsea Carey	Lisa Fargey	Charmaine Froese	Jennifer Clark-Rouire	2008 MBSTOH
2008–09	Chelsea Carey	Kari White	Kristen Foster	Lindsay Titheridge	2009 MBSTOH
2009–10	Chelsea Carey	Kari White	Kristen Foster	Lindsay Titheridge	2010 MBSTOH
2010–11	Chelsea Carey	Kristy Jenion	Kristen Foster	Lindsay Titheridge	2010 CC, 2011 MBSTOH
2011–12	Chelsea Carey	Kristy Jenion	Kristen Foster	Lindsay Titheridge	2011 CC, 2012 MBSTOH
2012–13	Chelsea Carey	Kristy Jenion	Kristen Foster	Lindsay Titheridge	2012 CC, 2013 MBSTOH
2013–14	Chelsea Carey	Kristy McDonald	Kristen Foster	Lindsay Titheridge	2013 COCT, 2014 MBSTOH
2014–15	Chelsea Carey	Laura Crocker	Taylor McDonald	Jen Gates	2015 ABSTOH
2015–16	Chelsea Carey	Amy Nixon	Jocelyn Peterman	Laine Peters	2016 ABSTOH, 2016 STOH, 2016 WWCC
2016–17	Chelsea Carey	Amy Nixon	Jocelyn Peterman	Laine Peters	2016 CC, 2017 STOH
2017–18	Chelsea Carey	Cathy Overton-Clapham	Jocelyn Peterman	Laine Peters	2017 COCT, 2018 ABSTOH
2018–19	Chelsea Carey	Sarah Wilkes	Dana Ferguson	Rachelle Brown	2018 CC, 2019 ABSTOH, 2019 STOH, 2019 WWCC
2019–20	Chelsea Carey	Sarah Wilkes	Dana Ferguson	Rachelle Brown	2019 CC, 2020 STOH
2020–21 (Note: Carey skipped Tracy Fleury's team at both the 2021 Scotties Tournament of Hearts and the 2021 Players' Championship.)	Chelsea Carey	Selena Njegovan	Liz Fyfe	Kristin MacCuish	2021 STOH
2021–22	Chelsea Carey	Jolene Campbell	Stephanie Schmidt	Jennifer Armstrong	2022 SKSTOH, 2022 STOH
2022–23	Chelsea Carey	Jolene Campbell	Liz Fyfe	Rachel Erickson	2023 MBSTOH
2023 (Note: Carey spared for both the Jennifer Jones and Michèle Jäggi rinks in tour events during the 2023–24 season.)	Chelsea Carey	Karlee Burgess	Emily Zacharias	Lauren Lenentine	
2023	Chelsea Carey	Michèle Jäggi	Stefanie Berset	Lisa Muhmenthaler	
2024	Chelsea Carey	Karlee Burgess	Emily Zacharias	Lauren Lenentine	
