= 2013 Manitoba Liquor & Lotteries Women's Classic =

- Host city: Winnipeg, Manitoba
- Arena: Fort Rouge Curling Club
- Dates: October 25–28
- Winner: (Manitoba) Jennifer Jones
- Curling club: St. Vital CC, Winnipeg
- Skip: Jennifer Jones
- Third: Kaitlyn Lawes
- Second: Jill Officer
- Lead: Dawn McEwen
- Finalist: (Manitoba) Jill Thurston

The 2013 Manitoba Liquor & Lotteries Women's Classic was held from October 25 to 28 at the Fort Rouge Curling Club in Winnipeg, Manitoba as part of the 2013–14 World Curling Tour. The event was the second women's Grand Slam of the season. The event was held in a triple knockout format, and the purse for the event was CAD$60,000, of which the winner received CAD$15,000.

In just the second all-Manitoba final in the event's history, the Jennifer Jones rink defeated Jill Thurston's rink, winning their first Grand Slam event since 2011 and their first Manitoba Liquor & Lotteries event since it became a Grand Slam. Thurston made her first career Grand Slam playoffs appearance, as well as her first career Grand Slam final.

== Teams ==
The teams are listed as follows:

| Skip | Third | Second | Lead | Locale |
|---|---|---|---|---|
| Joelle Brown | Alyssa Vandepoele | Jolene Rutter | Kelsey Hinds | Winnipeg, Manitoba |
| Chelsea Carey | Kristy McDonald | Kristen Foster | Lindsay Titheridge | Winnipeg, Manitoba |
| Andrea Crawford | Rebecca Atkinson | Danielle Parsons | Jodie deSolla | Fredericton, New Brunswick |
| Laura Crocker | Erin Carmody | Rebecca Pattinson | Jen Gates | Edmonton, Alberta |
| Michelle Englot | Candace Chisholm | Roberta Materi | Kristy Johnson | Regina, Saskatchewan |
| Karen Fallis | Sam Murata | Jennifer Clark-Rourie | Megan Brett | Winnipeg, Manitoba |
| Binia Feltscher | Irene Schori | Franziska Kaufmann | Christine Urech | Flims, Switzerland |
| Stacey Fordyce | Kelsey Russill | Janelle Schwindt | Roslynn Ripley | Brandon, Manitoba |
| Satsuki Fujisawa | Miyo Ichikawa | Emi Shimizu | Miyuki Satoh | Karuizawa, Japan |
| Janet Harvey | Cherie-Ann Loder | Kristin Loder | Carey Kirby | Winnipeg, Manitoba |
| Amber Holland | Jolene Campbell | Dailene Sivertson | Brooklyn Lemon | Regina, Saskatchewan |
| Tracy Horgan | Jenn Horgan | Jenna Enge | Amanda Gates | Sudbury, Ontario |
| Michèle Jäggi | Marisa Winkelhausen | Stéphanie Jäggi | Melanie Barbezat | Bern, Switzerland |
| Jennifer Jones | Kaitlyn Lawes | Jill Officer | Dawn McEwen | Winnipeg, Manitoba |
| Colleen Kilgallen | Janice Blair | Leslie Wilson-Westcott | Lesle Cafferty | Pinawa, Manitoba |
| Shannon Kleibrink | Bronwen Webster | Kalynn Park | Chelsey Matson | Calgary, Alberta |
| Kim Link | Susan Baleja | Angela Wickman | Renee Fletcher | East St. Paul, Manitoba |
| Breanne Meakin | Ashley Howard | Briane Meilleur | Krysten Karwacki | Winnipeg, Manitoba |
| Michelle Montford | Lisa DeRiviere | Sara Van Walleghem | Sarah Neufeld | Winnipeg, Manitoba |
| Eve Muirhead | Anna Sloan | Vicki Adams | Claire Hamilton | Stirling, Scotland |
| Mirjam Ott | Carmen Schäfer | Carmen Küng | Janine Greiner | Davos, Switzerland |
| Trish Paulsen | Kari Kennedy | Sarah Collin | Kari Paulsen | Saskatoon, Saskatchewan |
| Darcy Robertson | Tracey Lavery | Vanessa Foster | Michelle Kruk | Winnipeg, Manitoba |
| Anna Sidorova | Margarita Fomina | Aleksandra Saitova | Ekaterina Galkina | Moscow, Russia |
| Maria Prytz (fourth) | Christina Bertrup | Maria Wennerström | Margaretha Sigfridsson (skip) | Härnösand, Sweden |
| Renée Sonnenberg | Lawnie McDonald | Cary-Anne McTaggart | Rona Pasika | Grande Prairie, Alberta |
| Barb Spencer | Katie Spencer | Ainsley Champagne | Raunora Westcott | Winnipeg, Manitoba |
| Valerie Sweeting | Dana Ferguson | Joanne Taylor | Rachelle Pidherny | Edmonton, Alberta |
| Jill Thurston | Brette Richards | Brandi Oliver | Blaine de Jager | Winnipeg, Manitoba |
| Silvana Tirinzoni | Marlene Albrecht | Esther Neuenschwander | Manuela Siegrist | Aarau, Switzerland |
| Wang Bingyu | Liu Yin | Yue Qingshuang | Zhou Yan | Harbin, China |
| Crystal Webster | Cathy Overton-Clapham | Geri-Lynn Ramsay | Samantha Preston | Calgary, Alberta |

== Knockout results ==
The draw is listed as follows:

=== A event ===
First Knockout
(Manitoba) Stacey Fordyce | 1
(Manitoba) Jennifer Jones | 7
(China) Wang Bingyu | 6
(Ontario) Tracy Horgan | 2
(Switzerland) Silvana Tirinzoni | 8
(Ontario) Jill Thurston | 2
(Alberta) Laura Crocker | 3
(Saskatchewan) Trish Paulsen | 5
(Manitoba) Chelsea Carey | 5
(Manitoba) Karen Fallis | 4
(Switzerland) Michèle Jäggi | 6
(New Brunswick) Andrea Crawford | 4
(Sweden) Margaretha Sigfridsson | 5
(Manitoba) Michelle Montford | 7
(Alberta) Valerie Sweeting | 8
(Saskatchewan) Michelle Englot | 3

Quarterfinals
(Manitoba) Jennifer Jones | 6
(China) Wang Bingyu | 4
(Switzerland) Silvana Tirinzoni | 3
(Saskatchewan) Trish Paulsen | 7
(Manitoba) Chelsea Carey | 5
(Switzerland) Michèle Jäggi | 6
(Manitoba) Michelle Montford | 3
(Alberta) Valerie Sweeting | 9

Semifinals
(Manitoba) Jennifer Jones | 5
(Saskatchewan) Trish Paulsen | 3
(Switzerland) Michèle Jäggi | 3
(Alberta) Valerie Sweeting | 4

Qualifier 1
(Manitoba) Jennifer Jones | 8
(Alberta) Valerie Sweeting | 0

First Knockout
(Alberta) Renée Sonnenberg | 8
(Manitoba) Colleen Kilgallen | 4
(Switzerland) Mirjam Ott | 8
(Manitoba) Breanne Meakin | 10
(Switzerland) Binia Feltscher | 4
(Manitoba) Barb Spencer | 7
(Russia) Anna Sidorova | 8
(Manitoba) Kim Link | 4
(Alberta) Crystal Webster | 6
(Manitoba) Darcy Robertson | 3
(Alberta) Shannon Kleibrink | 2
(Manitoba) Janet Harvey | 5
(Saskatchewan) Amber Holland | 8
(Japan) Satsuki Fujisawa | 4
(Manitoba) Joelle Brown | 2
(Scotland) Eve Muirhead | 7

Quarterfinals
(Alberta) Renée Sonnenberg | 9
(Manitoba) Breanne Meakin | 2
(Manitoba) Barb Spencer | 3
(Russia) Anna Sidorova | 6
(Alberta) Crystal Webster | 7
(Manitoba) Janet Harvey | 9
(Saskatchewan) Amber Holland | 5
(Scotland) Eve Muirhead | 2

Semifinals
(Alberta) Renée Sonnenberg | 5
(Russia) Anna Sidorova | 7
(Manitoba) Janet Harvey | 5
(Saskatchewan) Amber Holland | 8

Qualifier 2
(Russia) Anna Sidorova | 7
(Saskatchewan) Amber Holland | 2

=== B event ===
Second Knockout
(Manitoba) Stacey Fordyce | 5
(Ontario) Tracy Horgan | 9
(Manitoba) Jill Thurston | 5
(Alberta) Laura Crocker | 7
(Manitoba) Karen Fallis | 5
(New Brunswick) Andrea Crawford | 6
(Sweden) Margaretha Sigfridsson | 8
(Saskatchewan) Michelle Englot | 5

Quarterfinals
(Ontario) Tracy Horgan | 5
(Alberta) Laura Crocker | 4
(New Brunswick) Andrea Crawford | 8
(Sweden) Margaretha Sigfridsson | 5

Semifinals
(Ontario) Tracy Horgan | 2
(Alberta) Renée Sonnenberg | 5
(New Brunswick) Andrea Crawford | 3
(Manitoba) Janet Harvey | 9

To Qualifier 3
(Alberta) Renée Sonnenberg | 5
(Manitoba) Janet Harvey | 8
Qualifier 3
(Manitoba) Janet Harvey | 7
(Alberta) Valerie Sweeting | 6

| Second Knockout | | Semifinals | | To Qualifier 3 |
| (Manitoba) Breanne Meakin | 6 |
| (Manitoba) Barb Spencer | 7 | (Manitoba) Barb Spencer | 1 |
| (Alberta) Crystal Webster | 1 | (Scotland) Eve Muirhead | 6 |
| (Scotland) Eve Muirhead | 8 | | | (Scotland) Eve Muirhead | 3 |
| | | | | (Alberta) Valerie Sweeting | 5 |

| Second Knockout | | Semifinals | | To Qualifier 4 |
| (China) Wang Bingyu | 8 |
| (Switzerland) Silvana Tirinzoni | 2 | (China) Wang Bingyu | 7 |
| (Manitoba) Chelsea Carey | 2 | (Manitoba) Michelle Montford | 9 |
| (Manitoba) Michelle Montford | 7 | | | (Manitoba) Michelle Montford | 9 |
| | | | | (Saskatchewan) Amber Holland | 4 |

Second Knockout
(Manitoba) Colleen Kilgallen | 2
(Switzerland) Mirjam Ott | 7
(Switzerland) Binia Feltscher | 5
(Manitoba) Kim Link | 4
(Manitoba) Darcy Robertson | 5
(Alberta) Shannon Kleibrink | 6
(Japan) Satsuki Fujisawa | 4
(Manitoba) Joelle Brown | 11

Quarterfinals
(Switzerland) Mirjam Ott | 2
(Switzerland) Binia Feltscher | 5
(Alberta) Shannon Kleibrink | 7
(Manitoba) Joelle Brown | 5

Semifinals
(Saskatchewan) Trish Paulsen | 6
(Switzerland) Binia Feltscher | 3
(Switzerland) Michèle Jäggi | 7
(Alberta) Shannon Kleibrink | 5

To Qualifier 4
(Saskatchewan) Trish Paulsen | 4
(Switzerland) Michèle Jäggi | 7
Qualifier 4
(Manitoba) Michelle Montford | 4
(Switzerland) Michèle Jäggi | 5

=== C event ===
Third Knockout
(Manitoba) Stacey Fordyce | 5
(Manitoba) Jill Thurston | 7

Quarterfinals
(Manitoba) Jill Thurston | 8
(China) Wang Bingyu | 5
(Switzerland) Binia Feltscher | 4
(Alberta) Shannon Kleibrink | 7

Semifinals
(Manitoba) Jill Thurston | 4
(Alberta) Shannon Kleibrink | 3

Qualifier 5
(Manitoba) Jill Thurston | 6
(Alberta) Valerie Sweeting | 5

Third Knockout
(Manitoba) Karen Fallis | 1
(Saskatchewan) Michelle Englot | 6
(Alberta) Laura Crocker | 5
(Sweden) Margaretha Sigfridsson | 6

Quarterfinals
(Manitoba) Breanne Meakin | 4
(Saskatchewan) Michelle Englot | 8
(Alberta) Crystal Webster | 8
(Sweden) Margaretha Sigfridsson | 5

Semifinals
(Saskatchewan) Michelle Englot | 4
(Saskatchewan) Amber Holland
(Alberta) Crystal Webster | 6
(Saskatchewan) Trish Paulsen | 4

Qualifier 6
(Saskatchewan) Amber Holland | 2
(Alberta) Crystal Webster | 9

Third Knockout
(Switzerland) Mirjam Ott | 10
(Manitoba) Joelle Brown | 3
(Manitoba) Colleen Kilgallen | 2
(Manitoba) Kim Link | 10

Quarterfinals
(Switzerland) Silvana Tirinzoni | 6
(Switzerland) Mirjam Ott | 4
(Manitoba) Chelsea Carey | 6
(Manitoba) Kim Link | 4

Semifinals
(Switzerland) Silvana Tirinzoni | 8
(Alberta) Renée Sonnenberg | 5
(Manitoba) Chelsea Carey | 8
(Scotland) Eve Muirhead | 3

Qualifier 7
(Switzerland) Silvana Tirinzoni | 6
(Manitoba) Chelsea Carey | 4

Third Knockout
(Manitoba) Darcy Robertson | 7
(Japan) Satsuki Fujisawa | 0

Quarterfinals
(Ontario) Tracy Horgan | 2
(New Brunswick) Andrea Crawford | 7
(Manitoba) Darcy Robertson | 2
(Manitoba) Barb Spencer | 5

Semifinals
(New Brunswick) Andrea Crawford | 4
(Manitoba) Barb Spencer | 5

Qualifier 8
(Manitoba) Barb Spencer | 5
(Manitoba) Michelle Montford | 4

== Playoffs ==
Quarterfinals
(Manitoba) Jennifer Jones | 6
(Alberta) Crystal Webster | 5
(Switzerland) Silvana Tirinzoni | 4
(Manitoba) Janet Harvey | 2
(Russia) Anna Sidorova | 5
(Manitoba) Jill Thurston | 6
(Manitoba) Barb Spencer | 8
(Switzerland) Michèle Jäggi | 4

Semifinals
(Manitoba) Jennifer Jones | 9
(Switzerland) Silvana Tirinzoni | 4
(Manitoba) Jill Thurston | 5
(Manitoba) Barb Spencer | 3

Final
(Manitoba) Jennifer Jones | 7
(Manitoba) Jill Thurston | 0
