= 1984 Canadian Junior Women's Curling Championship =

The 1984 Pepsi-Cola Canadian Junior Women's Curling Championship was held March 10-17, 1984 at the Fort St. John Curling Club in Fort St. John, British Columbia.

Manitoba, skipped by Darcy Kirkness from the Assiniboine Memorial Curling Club defeated Ontario, skipped by Kristin Holman 7–6. The game was won when one of Holman's sweepers burned her last rock of the 10th end. Holman was attempting to get a rock into the four foot to out score two Manitoba rocks. Kirkness did not have to throw her last stone. The other members of Team Manitoba were Kirkness' sister Barb, and front end of Janet Harvey and Barb Fetch.

The win was a record fifth provincial championship for the province of Manitoba in 1984. The province had also won the 1984 Canadian Junior Men's Curling Championship, the 1984 Scott Tournament of Hearts, the 1984 Labatt Brier and the 1984 Canadian Men's Senior Curling Championships.

== Round robin standings ==
Final standings

Key
Teams to Playoffs
Teams to Tiebreakers

Team	Skip	Locale	W	L
Manitoba	Darcy Kirkness	Winnipeg	8	2
Quebec	Debbie Wark	Dollard-des-Ormeaux	8	2
Ontario	Kristin Holman	Thornhill	7	3
Alberta	Lynn Slobodian	Lethbridge	7	3
Saskatchewan	Peggy Osczevski	Saskatoon	5	5
New Brunswick	Sherry Smith	Fredericton	5	5
Prince Edward Island	Janice MacCallum	Charlottetown	4	6
Northwest Territories/Yukon	Deborah Mabbitt	Pine Point	4	6
Nova Scotia	Heather Rankin	Wolfville	4	6
British Columbia	Christine Stevenson	Langford	3	7
Newfoundland	Jill Noseworthy	St. John's	0	10

=== Tiebreaker ===
March 16

Team	1	2	3	4	5	6	7	8	9	10	Final
Ontario (Holman)	1	0	0	0	5	1	0	0	2	X	9
Alberta (Slobodian)	0	0	0	2	0	0	1	1	0	X	4

== Playoffs ==
Semifinal			Final
			1	Manitoba	7
2	Quebec	6	3	Ontario	6
3	Ontario	7

=== Semifinal ===
March 17

Team	1	2	3	4	5	6	7	8	9	10	Final
Ontario (Holman)	1	0	2	1	1	0	1	1	0	X	7
Quebec (Wark)	0	3	0	0	0	2	0	0	1	X	6

=== Final ===
March 17

Team	1	2	3	4	5	6	7	8	9	10	Final
Ontario (Holman)	0	1	0	2	0	2	0	0	1	0	6
Manitoba (Kirkness)	2	0	1	0	1	0	0	2	0	1	7
