= 2011 Manitoba Scotties Tournament of Hearts =

- Host city: Altona, Manitoba
- Arena: Sunflower Gardens Arena
- Dates: January 26–30
- Winner: Team Overton-Clapham
- Curling club: Fort Rouge CC, Winnipeg
- Skip: Cathy Overton-Clapham
- Third: Karen Fallis
- Second: Leslie Wilson
- Lead: Raunora Westcott
- Finalist: Chelsea Carey

The 2011 Manitoba Scotties Tournament of Hearts, Manitoba's women's provincial curling championship, was held January 26–30 in Altona, Manitoba at the Sunflower Gardens Arena. The winning Cathy Overton-Clapham team represented Manitoba at the 2011 Scotties Tournament of Hearts in Charlottetown, Prince Edward Island. The team went 4–7 in round robin play.

== Teams ==
The sixteen Manitoba Safeway qualifiers are selected through the 1-9 rural zones, the 10-14 Winnipeg zones, the winning team from the Berth Bonspiel, and the CurlManitoba Women's Bonspiel winner from the previous 2009–2010 season.

=== Asham Black Group ===
Skip	Vice	Second	Lead	Club	Notes	Seed
Joelle Brown	Tracey Lavery	Leslie Cafferty	Kristie Moroz	Fort Rouge C.C.	Winnipeg zone 13 winner	8
Betty Buurma	Quinn Roberts	Jen Kienas	Suzie Scott	Carberry C.C.	Rural zone 5 winner	
Kerri Einarson	Janice Blair	Susan Baleja	Alison Harvey	Fort Rouge C.C.	CurlMB Women's Bonspiel winner	6
Janet Harvey	Cherie-Ann Loder	Kristin Loder	Carey Kirby	Assiniboine Memorial C.C.	Brandon Scotties Berth winner	4
Tina Kozak	Kortney Teale	Pam Robins	Krystal Stewart	Brandon C.C.	Rural zone 4 winner	
Cathy Overton-Clapham	Karen Fallis	Leslie Wilson	Raunora Westcott	Fort Rouge C.C.	Winnipeg zone 10 winner	1
Brette Richards	Cheryl Neufeld	Elisabeth Peters	Jillian Sandison	Assiniboine Memorial C.C.	Winnipeg zone 12 winner	
Kelly Wiwcharuk	Jodi Cockle	Georgette Sicotte	Sheila Ritchat	Snow Lake C.C.	Rural zone 1 winner	

=== Red Brick Red Group ===
Skip	Vice	Second	Lead	Club	Notes	Seed
Lisa Blixhavn	Lana Hunter	Jaimie Coxworth	Tanya Enns	Brandon C.C.	Rural zone 3 winner	7
Chelsea Carey	Kristy Jenion	Kristen Foster	Lindsay Titheridge	Morden C.C.	Rural zone 6 winner	3
Kim Link	Maureen Bonar	Colleen Kilgallen	Renee Fletcher	East St. Paul C.C.	Rural zone 8 winner	5
Bev Lumax	Lois Mosiondz	Betty Kotyk	Nancy McLennan	Swan River C.C.	Rural zone 2 winner	
Deb McCreanor	Laurie MacDonald	Stephanie Armstrong-Craplewe	Coralee Lamb	La Salle C.C.	Rural zone 7 winner	
Michelle Montford	Courtney Blanchard	Sara Jones	Sarah Norget	Fort Rouge C.C.	Winnipeg zone 14 winner	
Karen Rosser	Cheryl Reed	Sam Owen	Lindsay Edie	Springfield C.C.	Rural zone 9 winner	
Jill Thurston	Kristen Phillips	Jenna Loder	Kendra Georges	Granite C.C.	Winnipeg zone 11 winner	2

== Standings ==
=== Asham Black Group ===
Skip (Club)	W	L	PF	PA	Ends Won	Ends Lost	Blank Ends	Stolen Ends
Cathy Overton-Clapham (Fort Rouge)	6	1	59	29	33	24	3	12
Kerri Einarson (Fort Rouge)	5	2	54	35	34	28	7	9
Joelle Brown (Fort Rouge)	5	2	53	40	31	29	5	9
Janet Harvey (Assiniboine Memorial)	5	2	56	35	32	25	4	8
Brette Richards (Assiniboine Memorial)	4	3	44	41	28	29	5	6
Tina Kozak (Brandon)	2	5	44	47	28	29	4	6
Betty Buurma (Carberry)	1	6	35	60	26	33	8	6
Kelly Wiwcharuk (Snow Lake)	0	7	18	68	19	28	4	4

=== Red Brick Red Group ===
Skip (Club)	W	L	PF	PA	Ends Won	Ends Lost	Blank Ends	Stolen Ends
Chelsea Carey (Morden)	7	0	52	24	30	20	6	7
Karen Rosser (Springfield)	6	1	52	35	32	24	9	8
Kim Link (East St. Paul)	5	2	42	38	27	28	13	4
Michelle Montford (Fort Rouge)	4	3	49	37	30	28	9	5
Lisa Blixhavn (Brandon)	3	4	38	51	25	32	8	4
Jill Thurston (Granite)	2	5	39	41	23	28	11	2
Deb McCreanor (La Salle)	1	6	32	46	26	32	9	1
Bev Lumax (Swan River)	0	7	27	54	25	29	11	3

== Draw 1 ==
January 26, 8:30 AM CT

Sheet A	1	2	3	4	5	6	7	8	9	10	Final
Brown 🔨	6	0	1	3	2	X	X	X	X	X	12
Wiwcharuk	0	1	0	0	0	X	X	X	X	X	1

Sheet B	1	2	3	4	5	6	7	8	9	10	Final
Harvey	0	1	0	2	0	1	0	3	0	2	9
Kozak 🔨	2	0	1	0	3	0	1	0	1	0	8

Sheet C	1	2	3	4	5	6	7	8	9	10	Final
Buurma 🔨	1	0	1	0	1	0	0	0	X	X	3
Overton-Clapham	0	2	0	4	0	0	2	4	X	X	12

Sheet D	1	2	3	4	5	6	7	8	9	10	Final
Richards 🔨	1	0	1	1	0	0	0	1	0	0	4
Einarson	0	1	0	0	1	1	0	0	1	3	7

== Draw 2 ==
January 26, 12:15 PM CT

Sheet A	1	2	3	4	5	6	7	8	9	10	Final
Blixhavn	0	1	0	0	2	0	0	5	0	X	8
Lumax 🔨	1	0	1	1	0	0	0	0	1	X	4

Sheet B	1	2	3	4	5	6	7	8	9	10	Final
Carey	0	0	2	0	2	0	1	0	1	1	7
Montford 🔨	1	0	0	2	0	2	0	1	0	0	6

Sheet C	1	2	3	4	5	6	7	8	9	10	Final
McCreanor 🔨	1	0	0	1	0	0	1	0	1	X	4
Thurston	0	1	0	0	0	4	0	1	0	X	6

Sheet D	1	2	3	4	5	6	7	8	9	10	Final
Rosser 🔨	0	2	1	0	2	0	2	0	0	1	9
Link	0	0	0	3	0	1	0	0	3	0	7

== Draw 3 ==
January 26, 4:00 PM CT

Sheet A	1	2	3	4	5	6	7	8	9	10	Final
Kozak	0	0	2	0	1	X	X	X	X	X	3
Overton-Clapham 🔨	3	5	0	2	0	X	X	X	X	X	10

Sheet B	1	2	3	4	5	6	7	8	9	10	Final
Brown	0	1	0	1	0	1	2	0	0	0	5
Richards 🔨	1	0	2	0	1	0	0	1	2	3	10

Sheet C	1	2	3	4	5	6	7	8	9	10	Final
Wiwcharuk	0	0	1	0	0	1	0	0	X	X	2
Einarson 🔨	2	0	0	0	2	0	3	1	X	X	8

Sheet D	1	2	3	4	5	6	7	8	9	10	Final
Buurma	0	0	0	1	0	1	0	2	0	X	4
Harvey 🔨	1	0	2	0	3	0	1	0	2	X	9

== Draw 4 ==
January 26, 8:15 PM CT

Sheet A	1	2	3	4	5	6	7	8	9	10	Final
Montford 🔨	3	0	0	3	1	0	1	0	0	1	9
Thurston	0	3	0	0	0	1	0	1	1	0	6

Sheet B	1	2	3	4	5	6	7	8	9	10	Final
Blixhavn	0	0	1	0	0	1	0	0	0	X	2
Rosser 🔨	0	1	0	1	1	0	0	4	1	X	8

Sheet C	1	2	3	4	5	6	7	8	9	10	Final
Lumax	0	0	0	0	1	0	1	1	1	0	4
Link 🔨	1	2	0	0	0	1	0	0	0	2	6

Sheet D	1	2	3	4	5	6	7	8	9	10	Final
McCreanor	0	0	1	0	0	0	1	0	1	X	3
Carey 🔨	1	0	0	2	0	2	0	1	0	X	6

== Draw 5 ==
January 27, 8:30 AM CT

Sheet A	1	2	3	4	5	6	7	8	9	10	Final
Harvey 🔨	2	0	2	1	0	3	X	X	X	X	8
Richards	0	1	0	0	1	0	X	X	X	X	2

Sheet B	1	2	3	4	5	6	7	8	9	10	Final
Einarson 🔨	0	2	0	2	0	4	0	0	1	X	9
Buurma	0	0	1	0	1	0	1	1	0	X	4

Sheet C	1	2	3	4	5	6	7	8	9	10	Final
Brown	0	2	0	2	0	1	1	0	1	1	8
Kozak 🔨	1	0	1	0	2	0	0	2	0	0	6

Sheet D	1	2	3	4	5	6	7	8	9	10	Final
Wiwcharuk	0	1	0	0	0	1	0	3	0	X	5
Overton-Clapham 🔨	2	0	2	1	1	0	2	0	2	X	10

== Draw 6 ==
January 27, 12:15 PM CT

Sheet A	1	2	3	4	5	6	7	8	9	10	Final
Carey	0	0	1	0	2	2	0	0	2	X	7
Rosser 🔨	0	1	0	2	0	0	0	1	0	X	4

Sheet B	1	2	3	4	5	6	7	8	9	10	Final
Link	0	0	1	0	0	1	0	1	0	2	5
McCreanor 🔨	0	1	0	0	0	0	1	0	2	0	4

Sheet C	1	2	3	4	5	6	7	8	9	10	Final
Blixhavn 🔨	1	0	1	0	0	0	0	1	0	X	4
Montford	0	1	0	2	2	0	1	0	4	X	10

Sheet D	1	2	3	4	5	6	7	8	9	10	Final
Lumax	0	0	0	0	0	1	0	1	0	X	2
Thurston 🔨	1	0	0	2	0	0	1	0	2	X	6

== Draw 7 ==
January 27, 4:00 PM CT

Sheet A	1	2	3	4	5	6	7	8	9	10	Final
Buurma	0	0	0	0	1	2	1	0	2	0	6
Brown 🔨	0	0	1	3	0	0	0	4	0	1	9

Sheet B	1	2	3	4	5	6	7	8	9	10	Final
Overton-Clapham	0	0	2	0	1	1	1	2	1	X	8
Richards 🔨	2	1	0	0	0	0	0	0	0	X	3

Sheet C	1	2	3	4	5	6	7	8	9	10	Final
Wiwcharuk	0	1	0	0	1	0	X	X	X	X	2
Harvey 🔨	4	0	3	1	0	3	X	X	X	X	11

Sheet D	1	2	3	4	5	6	7	8	9	10	Final
Einarson	0	1	2	1	0	2	0	2	1	X	9
Kozak 🔨	0	0	0	0	1	0	2	0	0	X	3

== Draw 8 ==
January 27, 7:45 PM CT

Sheet A	1	2	3	4	5	6	7	8	9	10	11	Final
McCreanor 🔨	1	1	0	2	0	0	1	0	0	2	0	7
Blixhavn	0	0	1	0	1	1	0	1	2	0	1	8

Sheet B	1	2	3	4	5	6	7	8	9	10	Final
Thurston 🔨	2	0	0	2	0	1	0	0	1	0	6
Rosser	0	1	0	0	2	0	1	1	0	2	7

Sheet C	1	2	3	4	5	6	7	8	9	10	Final
Lumax	0	0	0	1	0	1	0	1	0	X	3
Carey 🔨	3	0	0	0	1	0	2	0	5	X	11

Sheet D	1	2	3	4	5	6	7	8	9	10	11	Final
Link	0	0	0	1	0	0	1	0	0	2	2	6
Mountford 🔨	0	0	1	0	1	1	0	1	0	0	0	4

== Draw 9 ==
January 28, 8:30 AM CT

Sheet A	1	2	3	4	5	6	7	8	9	10	Final
Carey 🔨	1	2	0	1	0	0	0	1	1	X	6
Link	0	0	1	0	1	0	1	0	0	X	3

Sheet B	1	2	3	4	5	6	7	8	9	10	Final
Montford	0	0	2	0	1	0	2	0	1	X	6
Lumax 🔨	1	0	0	1	0	1	0	1	0	X	4

Sheet C	1	2	3	4	5	6	7	8	9	10	Final
Rosser	0	0	1	0	2	0	1	1	0	1	6
McCreanor 🔨	1	0	0	1	0	1	0	0	1	0	4

Sheet D	1	2	3	4	5	6	7	8	9	10	Final
Blixhavn 🔨	1	0	0	0	1	0	4	0	0	1	7
Thurston	0	0	0	2	0	2	0	1	1	0	6

== Draw 10 ==
January 28, 12:15 PM CT

Sheet A	1	2	3	4	5	6	7	8	9	10	Final
Harvey 🔨	1	1	0	0	2	0	0	0	2	0	6
Einarson	0	0	1	2	0	2	0	1	0	1	7

Sheet B	1	2	3	4	5	6	7	8	9	10	Final
Kozak 🔨	2	0	2	2	0	0	2	2	X	X	10
Wiwcharuk	0	0	0	0	1	1	0	0	X	X	2

Sheet C	1	2	3	4	5	6	7	8	9	10	11	Final
Richards	0	0	0	1	0	0	2	0	4	0	1	8
Buurma 🔨	0	1	2	0	1	1	0	1	0	1	0	7

Sheet D	1	2	3	4	5	6	7	8	9	10	Final
Brown 🔨	0	1	0	1	0	0	0	1	0	X	3
Overton-Clapham	0	0	2	0	2	1	1	0	1	X	6

== Draw 11 ==
January 28, 4:00 PM CT

Sheet A	1	2	3	4	5	6	7	8	9	10	Final
Montford 🔨	1	2	0	0	2	1	0	3	X	X	9
McCreanor	0	0	1	0	0	0	1	0	X	X	2

Sheet B	1	2	3	4	5	6	7	8	9	10	Final
Link 🔨	1	1	0	4	0	0	0	2	0	1	9
Blixhavn	0	0	1	0	3	2	1	0	0	0	7

Sheet C	1	2	3	4	5	6	7	8	9	10	Final
Thurston	0	0	1	0	2	0	X	X	X	X	3
Carey 🔨	2	1	0	3	0	2	X	X	X	X	8

Sheet D	1	2	3	4	5	6	7	8	9	10	Final
Rosser 🔨	2	0	1	0	1	0	2	0	3	X	9
Lumax	0	0	0	1	0	2	0	1	0	X	4

== Draw 12 ==
January 28, 7:45 PM CT

Sheet A	1	2	3	4	5	6	7	8	9	10	Final
Kozak 🔨	1	0	1	2	1	0	2	1	0	X	8
Buurma	0	0	0	0	0	1	0	0	1	X	2

Sheet B	1	2	3	4	5	6	7	8	9	10	11	Final
Einarson	0	0	2	1	0	1	0	2	0	1	0	7
Brown 🔨	1	3	0	0	1	0	1	0	1	0	1	8

Sheet C	1	2	3	4	5	6	7	8	9	10	Final
Overton-Clapham	0	0	0	2	0	0	1	0	2	0	5
Harvey 🔨	1	1	1	0	1	1	0	1	0	1	7

Sheet D	1	2	3	4	5	6	7	8	9	10	Final
Richards	1	0	2	2	5	X	X	X	X	X	10
Wiwcharuk	0	1	0	0	0	X	X	X	X	X	1

== Draw 13 ==
January 29, 8:30 AM CT

Sheet A	1	2	3	4	5	6	7	8	9	10	Final
Thurston	0	0	1	0	3	0	0	0	X	X	4
Link 🔨	0	2	0	1	0	0	2	1	X	X	6

Sheet B	1	2	3	4	5	6	7	8	9	10	Final
McCreanor	0	3	0	1	0	2	0	1	0	1	8
Lumax 🔨	1	0	2	0	1	0	1	0	1	0	6

Sheet C	1	2	3	4	5	6	7	8	9	10	Final
Rosser	0	0	2	1	0	0	1	1	0	3	8
Montford 🔨	0	1	0	0	3	0	0	0	1	0	5

Sheet D	1	2	3	4	5	6	7	8	9	10	Final
Carey 🔨	0	1	0	1	0	3	2	X	X	X	7
Blixhavn	0	0	1	0	1	0	0	X	X	X	2

== Draw 14 ==
January 29, 12:15 PM CT

Sheet A	1	2	3	4	5	6	7	8	9	10	11	Final
Overton-Clapham	0	2	1	1	0	2	0	0	1	0	1	8
Einarson 🔨	2	0	0	0	2	0	1	1	0	1	0	7

Sheet B	1	2	3	4	5	6	7	8	9	10	Final
Buurma 🔨	2	0	0	0	2	0	0	0	2	1	7
Wiwcharuk	0	1	1	1	0	0	1	1	0	0	5

Sheet C	1	2	3	4	5	6	7	8	9	10	Final
Richards 🔨	2	0	2	0	0	1	0	1	0	1	7
Kozak	0	1	0	1	0	0	2	0	2	0	6

Sheet D	1	2	3	4	5	6	7	8	9	10	Final
Harvey 🔨	0	0	0	0	2	3	0	0	1	0	6
Brown	1	0	0	1	0	0	1	1	0	3	7

== Tie Breaker 1 ==
January 29, 4:00 PM CT

Sheet A	1	2	3	4	5	6	7	8	9	10	Final
Einarson 🔨	0	1	0	1	1	0	1	2	0	1	7
Harvey	0	0	1	0	0	3	0	0	2	0	6

== Tie Breaker 2 ==
January 29, 7:30 PM CT

Sheet B	1	2	3	4	5	6	7	8	9	10	Final
Brown 🔨	0	1	0	0	0	1	1	0	0	0	3
Einarson	0	0	0	2	0	0	0	1	2	1	6

== Playoffs ==
Page playoff system
B1	Cathy Overton-Clapham	6
R1	Chelsea Carey	7
B2	Kerri Einarson	6
R2	Karen Rosser	7

Semifinal
B1	Cathy Overton-Clapham	7
R2	Karen Rosser	3

Final
R1	Chelsea Carey	4
B1	Cathy Overton-Clapham	7

=== B1 vs. R1 ===
January 30, 8:30 AM CT

Sheet A	1	2	3	4	5	6	7	8	9	10	Final
Overton-Clapham 🔨	1	0	2	0	1	0	0	2	0	0	6
Carey	0	2	0	3	0	0	1	0	0	1	7

=== B2 vs. R2 ===
January 30, 8:30 AM CT

Sheet C	1	2	3	4	5	6	7	8	9	10	11	Final
Einarson 🔨	1	0	1	0	0	1	0	2	0	1	0	6
Rosser	0	1	0	2	0	0	1	0	2	0	1	7

=== Semifinal ===
January 30, 12:15 PM CT

Team	1	2	3	4	5	6	7	8	9	10	Final
Overton-Clapham	0	0	2	1	2	0	2	0	X	X	7
Rosser 🔨	0	1	0	0	0	1	0	1	X	X	3

=== Final ===
January 30, 4:00 PM CT

Team	1	2	3	4	5	6	7	8	9	10	Final
Carey 🔨	0	0	2	0	1	0	0	1	0	0	4
Overton-Clapham	0	1	0	1	0	1	2	0	1	1	7
