= Jill Thurston =

Canadian curler

- Curler
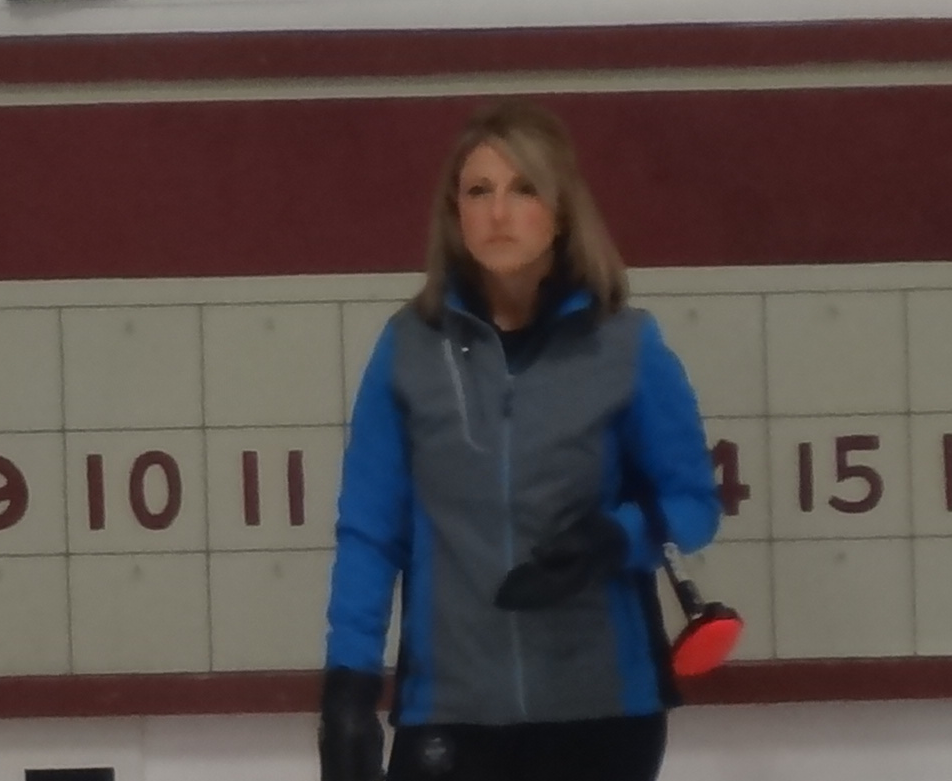
- Born: Jill Staub; December 2, 1971 (age 54); Winnipeg, Manitoba, Canada

Team
- Curling club: Granite CC, Winnipeg, MB

Curling career
- Hearts: 4 (1999, 2000, 2006, 2010)
- Top CTRS ranking: 6th (2014-15)
Medal record
Curling
Scotties Tournament of Hearts
Bronze medal – third place	2000 Prince George
Bronze medal – third place	1999 Charlottetown
Canadian Junior Curling Championships
Silver medal – second place	1991 Leduc

Jill Thurston (born December 2, 1971) is a Canadian curler. She skipped her own team out of the Granite Curling Club in Winnipeg, Manitoba.

== Career ==
=== Juniors ===
Thurston would represent Manitoba at the 1991 Canadian Junior Curling Championships. Her team consisting of Jennifer Jones, Kristie Moroz and Kelly MacKenzie would finish first place in round robin play, with a 10-1 finish. The team would get a bye into the final, however they would end up losing to New Brunswick's Heather Smith.

=== 1997–2007 ===
Thurston was a participant at the 1997 Canadian Olympic Curling Trials, which was won by Sandra Schmirler.

She would make her first Scott Tournament of Hearts appearance was in 1999, playing as the alternate for Connie Laliberte. The team finished first place in round robin, with an 8-3 record. They would lose the 1-2 game to Nova Scotia's Colleen Jones. In the semi-final the team would lose to Team Canada's Cathy Borst.

In 2000 Thurston would move to play third for Cathy Overton-Clapham, when Laliberte became pregnant. The team would win the Manitoba provincial, however before Thurston would play in the National championship, Laliberte returned to the team, throwing third and skipping the game, with Overton-Clapham throwing fourth stones, and Thurston back to alternate. At the 2000 Scott Tournament of Hearts, the team would finish second place with a 9-2 record in round robin play. They lost the 1-2 game to Ontario's Anne Merklinger and lost the semifinal to British Columbia's Kelley Law who would go on to win the tournament. Thurston's next Scott appearance was in 2006, this time playing third for Janet Harvey. The team would finish with a 4-7 record. Thurston would leave the team and take time off from curling at the end of the 2006/2007 season.

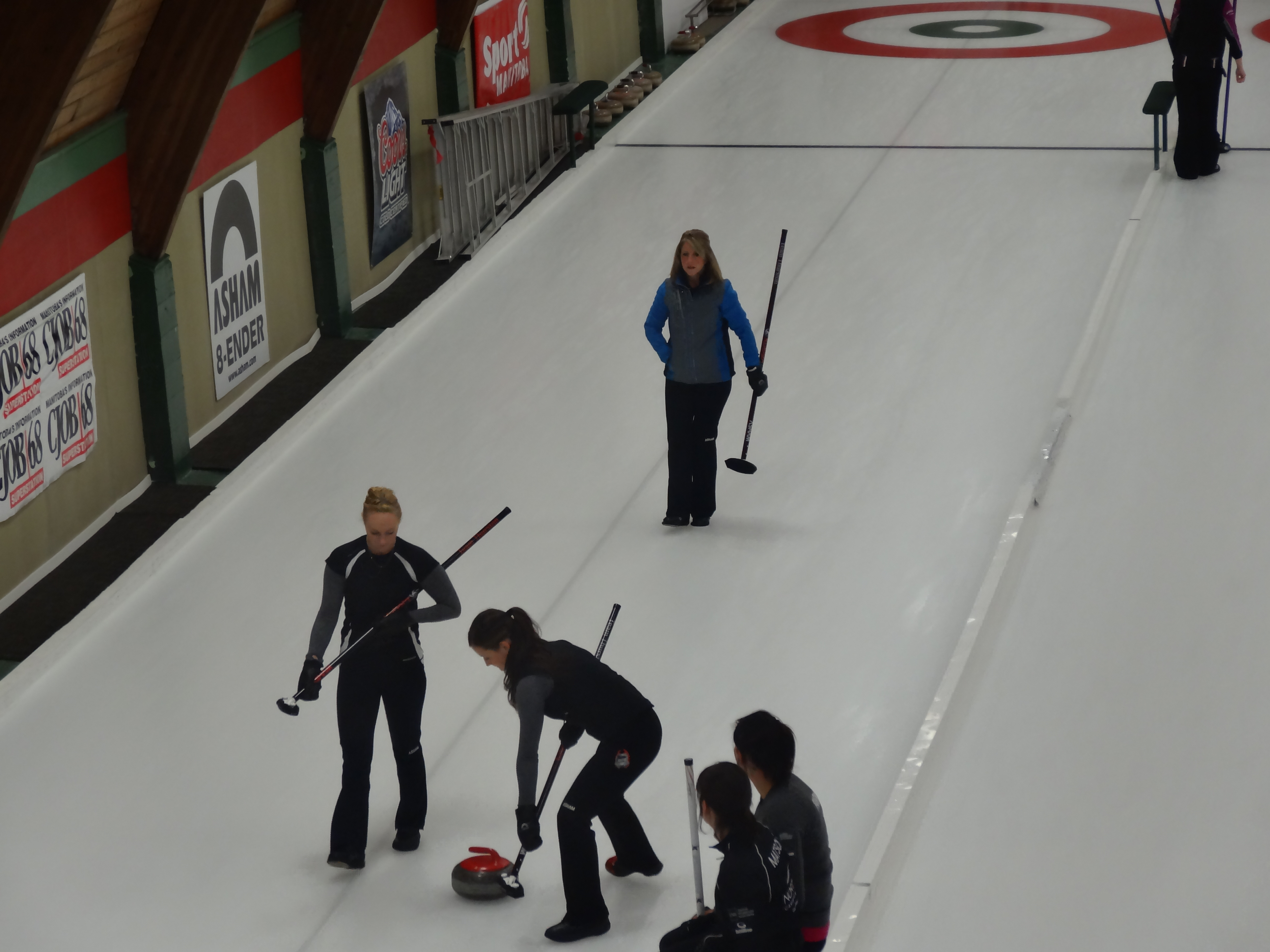
Jill Thurston follows her rock at the 2013 Manitoba Liquor & Lotteries Women's Classic curling event at the Fort Rouge Curling Club. The event would be the first Grand Slam where Thurston would make the playoffs. She lost to Jennifer Jones in the final.

=== 2009–current ===
After a two-year break from the game, Thurston returned to curling in 2009. Forming a team with Kristen Phillips, Leslie Wilson and Raunora Westcott. The team would win the 2010 Manitoba Scotties Tournament of Hearts and the right to represent Manitoba at the 2010 Scotties Tournament of Hearts This would be Thurstons first time skipping a team at the event. The team finished round robin play with a 7-4 record. This was enough to clinch a tiebreaker. Thurston's team would fall short, and she would lose the tie breaker 3-10 to Ontario's Krista McCarville.

At the end of the 2009/2010 season, Thurston would drop Wilson and Westcott from the team, (both of whom would end up playing for Cathy Overton-Clapham), and would add Jenna Loder and Kendra Georges to the team. The team would qualify for the 2011 Manitoba Scotties Tournament of Hearts, where they would finish with a disappointing 2-5 record.

Following the 2010/2011 season, Thurston would again change her lineup, replacing Phillips and Loder with Kerri Einarson and Sarah Wazney. For the third consecutive year Thurston would qualify for the 2012 Manitoba Scotties Tournament of Hearts, where she finished round robin tied for second place. She would face Jennifer Jones in the tiebreaker game, where the team would lose 5-8.

For the 2012/2013 curling season, Thurston has once again changed her lineup, reuniting with Kirsten Phillips, and adding Brette Richards to the team.

== Grand Slam record ==
Key
C	Champion
F	Lost in Final
SF	Lost in Semifinal
QF	Lost in Quarterfinals
R16	Lost in the round of 16
Q	Did not advance to playoffs
T2	Played in Tier 2 event
DNP	Did not participate in event
N/A	Not a Grand Slam event that season

Event	2006–07	2007–08	2008–09	2009–10	2010–11	2011–12	2012–13	2013–14	2014–15
Autumn Gold	Q	DNP	DNP	DNP	DNP	Q	DNP	DNP	QF
Masters	N/A	N/A	N/A	N/A	N/A	N/A	Q	DNP	
Colonial Square	N/A	N/A	N/A	N/A	N/A	N/A	DNP	DNP	
Canadian Open	N/A	N/A	N/A	N/A	N/A	N/A	N/A	N/A	
Players'	Q	DNP	DNP	DNP	DNP	DNP	DNP	DNP	

=== Former events ===
Event	2006–07	2007–08	2008–09	2009–10	2010–11	2011–12	2012–13	2013–14
Wayden Transportation	Q	DNP	DNP	N/A	N/A	N/A	N/A	N/A
Sobeys Slam	N/A	N/A	DNP	N/A	DNP	N/A	N/A	N/A
Manitoba Liquor & Lotteries	DNP	DNP	DNP	Q	Q	Q	Q	F
