= Janet Harvey =

Canadian curler

- Curler
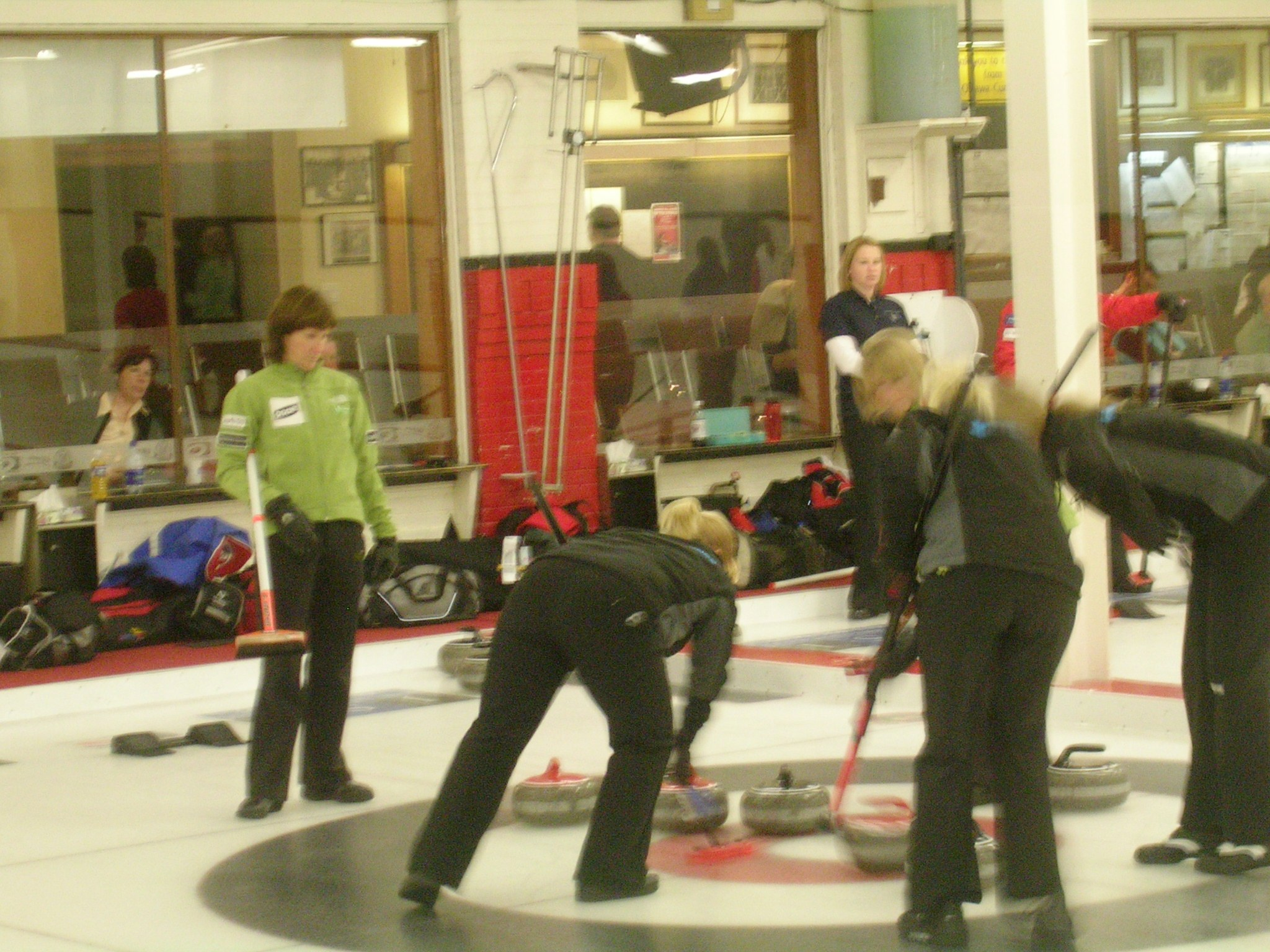
- Born: March 28, 1967 (age 59); Winnipeg, Manitoba, Canada

Team
- Curling club: Granite CC, Winnipeg, MB

Curling career
- Hearts: 3 (1990, 1997, 2006)
- Top CTRS ranking: 7th (2005-06)
Medal record
Curling
Canadian Olympic Curling Trials
Silver medal – second place	1987 Calgary

Janet Harvey (born March 28, 1967, in Winnipeg, Manitoba) is a Canadian curler.

In 1984, Harvey played second for Darcy Kirkness at that year's Canadian Junior Curling Championships. The team won the tournament, however there were no Worlds for women until 1988.

In 1986, Harvey returned to the Canadian Juniors as a skip, but lost in the semifinal to Newfoundland's Jill Noseworthy.

Since then, Harvey has been to three Scott Tournament of Hearts, (1990, 1997 and 2006) all as a skip, failing to make the playoffs at each one.

== Grand Slam record ==
Harvey had played in every single Manitoba Liquor & Lotteries Women's Classic since it became a Grand Slam before finally making the playoffs for the first time in 2013.

Key
C	Champion
F	Lost in Final
SF	Lost in Semifinal
QF	Lost in Quarterfinals
R16	Lost in the round of 16
Q	Did not advance to playoffs
T2	Played in Tier 2 event
DNP	Did not participate in event
N/A	Not a Grand Slam event that season

Event	2005–06	2006–07	2007–08	2008–09	2009–10	2010–11	2011–12	2012–13
Players'	Q	Q	DNP	DNP	DNP	DNP	DNP	DNP

=== Former events ===
Event	2006–07	2007–08	2008–09	2009–10	2010–11	2011–12	2012–13	2013–14	2014–15
Autumn Gold	Q	DNP	DNP	DNP	DNP	DNP	DNP	DNP	DNP
Manitoba Liquor & Lotteries	Q	Q	Q	Q	Q	Q	Q	QF	N/A
Colonial Square	N/A	N/A	N/A	N/A	N/A	N/A	Q	DNP	Q
Wayden Transportation	Q	Q	DNP	N/A	N/A	N/A	N/A	N/A	N/A

== Sources ==
- World Curling Tour Profile
- Scotties Tournament of Hearts Statistics
