= Barb Spencer =

Canadian curler

- Curler
- Born: Barbara Kirkness; February 14, 1966 (age 60); Winnipeg, Manitoba, Canada

Team
- Curling club: Assiniboine Memorial CC, Winnipeg, MB
- Skip: Barb Spencer
- Third: Katie Spencer
- Second: Holly Spencer
- Lead: Allyson Spencer

Curling career
- Hearts: 3 (1986, 2003, 2009)
- Top CTRS ranking: 12th (2014-15)
- Grand Slam victories: 0

Barbara Spencer (born Barbara Jay Kirkness, February 14, 1966) is a Canadian curler from Sanford, Manitoba. Spencer is a former Canadian Junior champion and a three-time provincial champion.

== Career ==
Spencer had a successful junior career, playing third for her sister, Darcy's team. The team won the 1984 Canadian Junior Women's Curling Championship for Manitoba. Two years later, Spencer won the provincial mixed championship, playing third for Hal Tanasichuk.

Spencer won her first provincial women's title, playing third for her sister, Darcy. The rink, which also included Barbara Fetch and Faye Irwin would go on to represent Manitoba at the 1986 Scott Tournament of Hearts. The team finished the tournament in a three-way tie for 4th place and a 6-5 record.

Spencer did not return to the Hearts until she won the 2003 provincial title. This time, Spencer skipped the team, while her sister Darcy played third, while Barb Enright and Faye Unrau rounded out the team. The team would finish with a 4-7 record at the 2003 Scott Tournament of Hearts.

Barb and Darcy won their third provincial title in 2009. This time, Enright was throwing lead stones, while new player Brette Richards was at second. At the 2009 Scotties Tournament of Hearts, the rink finished the event with a 2-9 record.

Spencer's sister, Darcy left the rink in 2011 to form her own team. In 2012, Spencer added her daughter, Katie to her team.

== Personal life ==
Spencer comes from a curling family. Not only are her sister and daughters curlers, her father Jim Kirkness, her brother James Kirkness and her husband Jim Spencer are as well.

== Grand Slam record ==
In Grand Slam events, Spencer has made the quarterfinals in five events, and the semi-finals. Since it became a Grand Slam event, Spencer has played in every single Manitoba Lotteries Women's Curling Classics since it became a Grand Slam, making the semi-finals in 2013, and the quarters in 2008, 2009 and 2012. She also made it to the quarter-finals of the 2008 Trail Appliances Curling Classic (Autumn Gold) and the 2014 Curlers Corner Autumn Gold Curling Classic.

Key
C	Champion
F	Lost in Final
SF	Lost in Semifinal
QF	Lost in Quarterfinals
R16	Lost in the round of 16
Q	Did not advance to playoffs
T2	Played in Tier 2 event
DNP	Did not participate in event
N/A	Not a Grand Slam event that season

Event	2006–07
Players'	Q

=== Former events ===
Event	2006–07	2007–08	2008–09	2009–10	2010–11	2011–12	2012–13	2013–14	2014–15
Manitoba Liquor & Lotteries	Q	Q	QF	QF	Q	Q	QF	SF	N/A
Autumn Gold	Q	DNP	QF	Q	DNP	DNP	Q	Q	QF
