= 2009–10 curling season =

- Sport: Curling

Seasons
- ← 2008–09 2010–11 →

The 2009–10 curling season began in September 2009 and ended in April 2010.

== Season of Champions ==
(Only team's skip listed)

| Event | Winner | Runner-up | Third place |
|---|---|---|---|
| Canadian Mixed | Nova Scotia (Dacey) | Ontario (Bice) | British Columbia (Montgomery) |
| TSN Skins Game | (Scotland) David Murdoch | (Alberta) Randy Ferbey | (Ontario) Glenn Howard (Alberta) Kevin Martin |
| Canadian Juniors (men's) | Ontario Walker | Manitoba Forrest | Saskatchewan Moskowy |
| Canadian Juniors (women's) | Ontario (Homan) | British Columbia (Silvertson) | Northern Ontario (Lilly) |
| Scotties Tournament of Hearts | Canada (Jones) | Prince Edward Island (O'Rourke) | Ontario (McCarville) |
| Winter Olympics - Men's | Canada (Martin) | Norway (Ulsrud) | Switzerland (Stöckli) |
| Winter Olympics - Women's | Sweden (Norberg) | Canada (Bernard) | China (Wang B.) |
| Tim Hortons Brier | Alberta (Koe) | Ontario (Howard) | Northern Ontario (Jacobs) |
| World Junior Championships (men's) | Switzerland (Schwarz) | Scotland (Fraser) | Canada (Walker) |
| World Junior Championships (women's) | Sweden (Hasselborg) | Canada (Homan) | United States (Carlson) |
| Canadian Seniors (men's) | Alberta (Johnson) | Ontario (Parry) | Saskatchewan (Heidt) |
| Canadian Seniors (women's) | British Columbia (Jurgenson) | New Brunswick (Hanlon) | Northern Ontario (Barrett) |
| Women's World Championships | Germany (Schöpp) | Scotland (Muirhead) | Canada (Jones) |
| Men's World Championships | Canada (Koe) | Norway (Nergård) | Scotland (Smith) |

== Other events ==
| Event | Winner | Runner-up | Third place |
|---|---|---|---|
| European Mixed | Scotland (Brewster) | Denmark (Ostrowski) | England (Macdougall) |
| Pacific Championships (men's) | China (Wang F.) | Japan (Morozumi) | South Korea (Kim C.) |
| Pacific Championships (women's) | China (Wang B.) | Japan (Meguro) | South Korea (Kim Y.) |
| European Championships (men's) | Sweden (Edin) | Switzerland (Stöckli) | Norway (Ulsrud) |
| European Championships (women's) | Germany (Schöpp) | Switzerland (Ott) | Denmark (Jensen) |
| USA-Brazil Challenge | United States (Fenson) | Brazil (Kossaka) | |
| Winter Paralympics (wheelchair) | Canada (Armstrong) | South Korea (Kim H.) | Sweden (Jungnell) |
| Mixed Doubles | Russia (Dron/Nekrosova) | New Zealand (S. Becker/B. Becker) | China (Zhang/Sun) |
| World Seniors (men's) | United States (Pustovar) | Canada (Delaney) | Australia (Millikin) |
| World Seniors (women's) | Canada (Pinkney) | Switzerland (Nedkoff) | Sweden (Meldahl) |

== World Curling Tour events ==
| Event | Date | Location | Winning skip | Runner-up skip |
|---|---|---|---|---|
| Baden Masters | Sept 11-13 | Baden, Switzerland | (Newfoundland and Labrador) Brad Gushue | (Norway) Thomas Ulsrud |
| September Shoot-Out | Sept 16-20 | Edmonton, AB | (British Columbia) Bob Ursel | (Alberta) Randy Ferbey |
| AMJ Campbell Shorty Jenkins Classic | Sept 17-20 | Brockville, ON | (Newfoundland and Labrador) Brad Gushue | (Alberta) Kevin Martin |
| Radisson SAS Oslo Cup | Sept 24-27 | Oslo, Norway | (Sweden) Oskar Eriksson | (Norway) Thomas Ulsrud |
| Horizon Laser Vision Center Classic | Oct. 1-4 | Regina, SK | (Saskatchewan) Pat Simmons | (Saskatchewan) Brennen Jones |
| Twin Anchors Invitational | Oct. 1-4 | Vernon, BC | (Alberta) Kevin Koe | (British Columbia) Bob Ursel |
| Swiss Cup Basel | Oct. 2-5 | Basel, Switzerland | (Norway) Thomas Ulsrud | (Sweden) Niklas Edin |
| World Financial Group Classic | Oct. 9-12 | Calgary, AB | (Alberta) Brent Bawel | (Alberta) Steve Mackey |
| Manitoba Lotteries Men's Curling Classic | Oct. 9-12 | Brandon, MB | (Manitoba) Jeff Stoughton | (Manitoba) David Bohn |
| Westcoast Curling Classic | Oct. 9-12 | New Westminster, BC | (British Columbia) Bob Ursel | (British Columbia) Sean Geall |
| Bern Open | Oct. 16-18 | Bern, Switzerland | (Norway) Thomas Ulsrud | (New Brunswick) Russ Howard |
| St. Paul Cash Spiel | Oct. 16-19 | St. Paul, Minnesota | (Ontario) Mike Pozihun | (Ontario) Bryan Burgess |
| Meyers Norris Penny Charity Classic | Oct. 16-19 | Medicine Hat, AB | (Alberta) Wade White | (Alberta) Ted Appelman |
| Challenge Casino Lac Leamy | Oct. 22-25 | Gatineau, QC | (Quebec) Jean-Michel Ménard | (Ontario) Neil Sinclair |
| Grey Power World Cup of Curling | Oct. 22-25 | Mississauga, ON | (Ontario) Glenn Howard | (Alberta) Kevin Koe |
| Kamloops Crown of Curling | Oct. 23-26 | Kamloops, BC | (Alberta) Ted Appelman | (Alberta) Chris Schille |
| Meyers Norris Penny Prairie Classic | Oct. 23-26 | Portage la Prairie, MB | (Manitoba) Kerry Burtnyk | (Manitoba) Jason Gunnlaugson |
| Cactus Pheasant Classic | Oct. 29-Nov 1 | Brooks, AB | (Ontario) Glenn Howard | (Alberta) Kevin Martin |
| Duluth Cash Spiel | Nov. 6-8 | Duluth, MN | (United States) Pete Fenson | (United States) Craig Brown |
| Whites Drug Store Classic | Nov. 6-9 | Swan River, MB | (Alberta) Kevin Martin | (Manitoba) Dave Boehmer |
| Red Deer Curling Classic | Nov. 6-9 | Red Deer, AB | (Alberta) Randy Ferbey | (Alberta) Rob Armitage |
| Lucerne Curling Trophy | Nov. 12-15 | Lucerne, Switzerland | (Norway) Thomas Ulsrud | (Switzerland) Ralph Stöckli |
| Pharmasave Gimli Classic | Nov. 13-15 | Gimli, MB | (Manitoba) Brendan Taylor | (Manitoba) Reid Carruthers |
| Interlake Pharmacy Classic | Nov. 19-23 | Stonewall, MB | (Manitoba) David Bohn | (Manitoba) Dave Elias |
| Skookum WCT Cash Spiel | Nov. 19-23 | Whitehorse, YK | (Alberta) Kevin Martin | (British Columbia) Sean Geall |
| Sun Life Classic | Nov. 20-23 | Brantford, ON | (Manitoba) Mike McEwen | (Quebec) Martin Ferland |
| Wainwright Roaming Buffalo Classic | Nov. 20-23 | Wainwright, AB | (Saskatchewan) Warren Hassall | (Alberta) Brent Bawel |
| Challenge Casino de Charlevoix | Nov. 25-29 | Clermont, QC | (Alberta) Randy Ferbey | (Quebec) Jean-Michel Ménard |
| Edinburgh International | Nov. 27-29 | Edinburgh, Scotland | (Scotland) David Murdoch | (Scotland) Peter Loudon |
| Point Optical Curling Classic | Nov. 27-30 | Saskatoon, SK | (Saskatchewan) Brad Heidt | (Saskatchewan) Pat Simmons |
| Laphroaig Scotch Open | Dec. 4-6 | Madison, WI | (United States) Kroy Nernberger | (United States) Pete Fenson |
| Dauphin Clinic Pharmacy Classic | Dec. 4-7 | Dauphin, MB | (Manitoba) David Hamblin | (Manitoba) Travis Graham |
| Curl Mesabi Cash Spiel | Dec. 11-13 | Eveleth, MN | (United States) John Shuster | (Manitoba) Andrew Wickman |
| The Swiss Chalet National | Jan. 6-10 | Guelph, ON | (Newfoundland and Labrador) Brad Gushue | (Alberta) Randy Ferbey |
| Ramada Perth Masters | Jan. 7-10 | Perth, Scotland | (Scotland) Tom Brewster | (Sweden) Niklas Edin |
| BDO Classic Canadian Open | Jan. 20-24 | Winnipeg, MB | (Alberta) Kevin Martin | (Ontario) Glenn Howard |
| DEKALB Superspiel | Mar. 11-15 | Morris, MB | (Manitoba) Mike McEwen | (Manitoba) Dave Boehmer |
| Bear Mountain Arena Classic | Mar. 25-28 | Victoria, BC | (Alberta) Kevin Martin | (Ontario) Wayne Middaugh |
| Grey Power Players' Championship | Apr. 13-18 | Dawson Creek, BC | (Alberta) Kevin Martin | (Newfoundland and Labrador) Brad Gushue |

== Women's World Curling Tour events ==
| Event | Date | Location | Winning skip | Runner-up skip |
|---|---|---|---|---|
| September Shoot-Out | Sept 16-20 | Edmonton, AB | (Alberta) Cathy King | (Alberta) Cheryl Bernard |
| AMJ Campbell Shorty Jenkins Classic | Sept 17-20 | Brockville, ON | (Ontario) Rachel Homan | (Quebec) Ève Bélisle |
| Radisson SAS Oslo Cup | Sept 24-27 | Oslo, Norway | (Manitoba) Jennifer Jones | (Sweden) Anette Norberg |
| Schmirler Curling Classic | Sept 25-28 | Regina, SK | (Saskatchewan) Amber Holland | (British Columbia) Kelly Scott |
| Twin Anchors Invitational | Oct. 1-4 | Vernon, BC | (Japan) Moe Meguro | (Alberta) Cheryl Bernard |
| Trail Appliances Curling Classic | Oct. 9-12 | Calgary, AB | (Manitoba) Jennifer Jones | (China) Wang Bingyu |
| RE/MAX Masters Basel | Oct. 9-12 | Basel, Switzerland | (Sweden) Anette Norberg | (Sweden) Stina Viktorsson |
| Meyers Norris Penny Charity Classic | Oct 16-19 | Medicine Hat, AB | (Russia) Liudmila Privivkova | (Alberta) Karallee Swabb |
| Grasshopper Women's Masters | Oct 16-18 | Zürich, Switzerland | (Germany) Andrea Schöpp | (United States) Debbie McCormick |
| Three Nations Cup | Oct 23-25 | Mississauga, ON | (Scotland) Eve Muirhead | (Saskatchewan) Stefanie Lawton |
| Kamloops Crown of Curling | Oct 23-26 | Kamloops, BC | (British Columbia) Colleen Hannah | (Alberta) Faye White |
| Manitoba Lotteries Women's Curling Classic | Oct 23-26 | Winnipeg, MB | (British Columbia) Kelly Scott | (Manitoba) Jennifer Jones |
| Stockholm Ladies Cup | Oct. 29-Nov. 1 | Stockholm, Sweden | (Sweden) Karin Rudstrom | (Russia) Anna Sidorova |
| Colonial Square Ladies Classic | Oct. 30-Nov. 2 | Saskatoon, SK | (Saskatchewan) Stefanie Lawton | (Switzerland) Mirjam Ott |
| Duluth Cash Spiel | Nov. 6-8 | Duluth, MN | (Ontario) Shauna Kentonen | (United States) Erika Brown |
| Red Deer Curling Classic | Nov. 6-9 | Red Deer, AB | (Manitoba) Jennifer Jones | (Alberta) Shannon Kleibrink |
| OVCA Women's Fall Classic | Nov. 6-8 | Kemptville, ON | (United States) Debbie McCormick | (Ontario) Lisa Farnell |
| Interlake Pharmacy Classic | Nov. 19-23 | Stonewall, MB | (Manitoba) Chelsea Carey | (Manitoba) Janet Harvey |
| Sun Life Classic | Nov. 20-23 | Brantford, ON | (Ontario) Jo-Ann Rizzo | (Alberta) Shannon Kleibrink |
| International ZO Women's Tournament | Nov. 27-29 | Wetzikon, Switzerland | (Scotland) Eve Muirhead | (Germany) Andrea Schöpp |
| Boundary Ford Curling Classic | Nov. 27-30 | Lloydminster, AB | (Alberta) Heather Nedohin | (Alberta) Heather Rankin |
| International Bernese Ladies Cup | Jan. 8-10 | Bern, Switzerland | (Manitoba) Jennifer Jones | (Japan) Moe Meguro |
| Glynhill Ladies International | Jan. 15-17 | Glasgow, Scotland | (Switzerland) Mirjam Ott | (Scotland) Eve Muirhead |
| DEKALB Superspiel | Mar. 11-15 | Morris, MB | (Ontario) Sherry Middaugh | (China) Bingyu Wang |
| Grey Power Players' Championship | Apr. 13-18 | Dawson Creek, BC | (Alberta) Cheryl Bernard | (Alberta) Crystal Webster |

== WCT Order of Merit Rankings (Men's) ==
| # | Skip |
|---|---|
| 1 | (Alberta) Kevin Martin |
| 2 | (Ontario) Glenn Howard |
| 3 | (Newfoundland and Labrador) Brad Gushue |
| 4 | (Norway) Thomas Ulsrud |
| 5 | (Alberta) Kevin Koe |
| 6 | (Manitoba) Jeff Stoughton |
| 7 | (Alberta) Randy Ferbey |
| 8 | (Ontario) Wayne Middaugh |
| 9 | (Manitoba) Mike McEwen |
| 10 | (Scotland) David Murdoch |

== WCT Order of Merit Rankings (Women's) ==
| # | Skip |
|---|---|
| 1 | (Manitoba) Jennifer Jones |
| 2 | (Alberta) Cheryl Bernard |
| 3 | (Alberta) Shannon Kleibrink |
| 4 | (China) Wang Bingyu |
| 5 | (Saskatchewan) Stefanie Lawton |
| 6 | (British Columbia) Kelly Scott |
| 7 | (Switzerland) Mirjam Ott |
| 8 | (Saskatchewan) Amber Holland |
| 9 | (Sweden) Anette Norberg |
| 10 | (Quebec) Marie-France Larouche |

== Money Ranking ==
| # | Men's teams | $ (CAD) | Women's teams | $ (CAD) |
|---|---|---|---|---|
| 1 | Kevin Martin | 139,750 | Jennifer Jones | 55,578 |
| 2 | Glenn Howard | 97,150 | Cheryl Bernard | 43,209 |
| 3 | Brad Gushue | 82,528 | Kelly Scott | 37,300 |
| 4 | Thomas Ulsrud | 73,598 | Amber Holland | 27,200 |
| 5 | Randy Ferbey | 70,382 | Shannon Kleibrink | 27,000 |
| 6 | Mike McEwen | 66,255 | Stefanie Lawton | 26,000 |
| 7 | Kevin Koe | 65,650 | Crystal Webster | 24,800 |
| 8 | Pat Simmons | 47,500 | Wang Bingyu | 24,300 |
| 9 | Jeff Stoughton | 43,000 | Eve Muirhead | 23,526 |
| 10 | Wayne Middaugh | 43,000 | Debbie McCormick | 23,421 |

| Preceded by 2008–09 | 2009–10 curling season September 2009 – April 2010 | Succeeded by 2010–11 |
