= 2007–08 curling season =

- Sport: Curling

Seasons
- ← 2006–07 2008–09 →

The 2007-08 curling season began in September 2007 and ended in April 2008.

== Season of Champions top three finishes ==
(Only team's skip listed)

Event	Winner	Runner-up	Third place
Canadian Mixed	Alberta (Ross)	Ontario (Turcotte)	Nova Scotia (Burgess)
TSN Skins Game	Kevin Martin	Wayne Middaugh	Glenn Howard; Brad Gushue
Continental Cup	(Canada) (United States) North America	Europe	
Canadian Juniors (men's)	Quebec (Dion)	Ontario (Fanset)	Prince Edward Island (Gallant)
Canadian Juniors (women's)	Manitoba (Lawes)	Saskatchewan (McVicar)	Nova Scotia (Pearsons)
Scotties Tournament of Hearts	Manitoba (Jones)	Alberta (Kleibrink)	Ontario (S. Middaugh)
Tim Hortons Brier	Alberta (Martin)	Ontario (G. Howard)	Saskatchewan (Simmons)
World Junior Championships (men's)	United States (Plys)	Sweden (Eriksson)	Canada (Dion)
World Junior Championships (women's)	Scotland (Muirhead)	Sweden (Östlund)	Canada (Lawes)
Canada Cup (men's)	Kevin Koe	Kevin Martin	Brad Gushue
Canada Cup (women's)	Stefanie Lawton	Kelly Scott	Cheryl Bernard
Canadian Seniors (men's)	Saskatchewan (Hritzuk)	New Brunswick (R. Howard)	Nova Scotia (Rafuse)
Canadian Seniors (women's)	British Columbia (Sanders)	Ontario (Pearson)	Alberta (Turner)
Women's World Championships	Canada (Jones)	China (Wang B.)	Switzerland (Ott)
Men's World Championships	Canada (Martin)	Scotland (Murdoch)	Norway (Ulsrud)

== Other events ==
Event	Winner	Runner-up	Third place
European Mixed	Wales (Meikle)	Denmark (Ostrowski)	Germany (Schöpp)
Pacific Championships (men's)	China (Wang F.)	Australia (Millikin)	New Zealand (Becker)
Pacific Championships (women's)	China (Wang B.)	Japan (Meguro)	South Korea (Park)
European Championships (men's)	Scotland (Murdoch)	Norway (Ulsrud)	Denmark (Frederiksen)
European Championships (women's)	Sweden (Norberg)	Scotland (Wood)	Denmark (Nielsen)
European Junior Challenge (men's)	Czech Republic (Chaloupek)	Poland (Wachulak)	France (Vincent)
European Junior Challenge (women's)	Germany (Templin)	Italy (Apollonio)	Czech Republic (Kubeska)
Pacific Juniors (men's)	China (Zang)	Japan (Sakamoto)	South Korea (Lee)
Pacific Juniors (women's)	Japan (Fujiwasa)	China (Sun)	South Korea (Kim Y. M.)
World Wheelchair Championship	Norway (Lorentsen)	South Korea (Kim H. S.)	United States (Jiminez Perez)
Mixed Doubles	Switzerland Schori/Müller	Finland Malmi/J. Uusipaavalniemi	Sweden Persson/Carlsson
World Seniors (men's)	Canada (Ryan)	Sweden (Lindeman)	United States (Russell)
World Seniors (women's)	Canada (Foster)	Scotland (Letton)	Switzerland (Nedkoff)

== World Curling Tour winners ==
Event	Date	Location	Winning skip	Runner-up skip
Baden Masters	Sept. 7-9	Baden, Switzerland	(Newfoundland and Labrador) Brad Gushue	(Germany) Andy Kapp
Radisson SAS Oslo Cup	Sept. 20-23	Oslo, Norway	(Alberta) Kevin Koe	(Norway) Pål Trulsen
AMJ Campbell Shorty Jenkins Classic	Sept. 20-23	Brockville, Ontario	(Ontario) Glenn Howard	(Newfoundland and Labrador) Brad Gushue
Boston Pizza September Shoot-Out	Sept. 21-23	Edmonton, Alberta	(Saskatchewan) Pat Simmons	(Alberta) Brent MacDonald
Twin Anchors Houseboat Cashspiel	Sept. 27-30	Vernon, British Columbia	(British Columbia) Bob Ursel	(British Columbia) Sean Geall
Mac Ice Classic	Oct. 4-8	Ottawa, Ontario	(Quebec) Jean-Michel Ménard	(Ontario) Greg Richardson
Swiss Cup Basel	Oct. 5-8	Basel, Switzerland	(Scotland) David Murdoch	(Switzerland) Stefan Karnusian
PriceWaterHouseCoopers Westcoast Curling Classic	Oct. 5-9	New Westminster, British Columbia	(Alberta) Kevin Koe	(British Columbia) Bob Ursel
Valour Road Open	Oct. 5-8	Winnipeg, Manitoba	(Manitoba) Allan Lyburn	(Manitoba) Peter Nicholls
Don Bartlett Classic	Oct. 11-14	Gander, Newfoundland and Labrador	(Nova Scotia) Shawn Adams	(Alberta) Randy Ferbey
St. Paul Cashspiel	Oct. 12-15	St. Paul, Minnesota	(United States) Craig Disher	(Ontario) Trevor Clifford
Meyers Norris Penny Charity Classic	Oct. 12-15	Medicine Hat, Alberta	(Alberta) James Pahl	(Saskatchewan) Pat Simmons
Coupe Quebec La Cage aux Sports	Oct. 18-21	Quebec, Quebec	(Quebec) François Gagné	(Ontario) Bryan Cochrane
Bern Open	Oct. 19-22	Bern, Switzerland	(New Brunswick) Russ Howard	(Switzerland) Ralph Stöckli
Strauss Crown of Curling	Oct. 19-22	Kamloops, British Columbia	(British Columbia) Bryan Miki	(British Columbia) Greg McAulay
Flint Energy Curling Classic	Oct. 19-22	Bonnyville, Alberta	(Alberta) Kevin Martin	(Alberta) Randy Ferbey
Meyers Norris Penny Prairie Classic	Oct. 26-29	Portage la Prairie, Manitoba	(Ontario) Glenn Howard	(Saskatchewan) Joel Jordison
Red Deer Curling Classic	Nov. 1-4	Red Deer, Alberta	(Alberta) Kurt Balderston	(Alberta) Rob Armitage
Cactus Pheasant Classic	Nov. 1-4	Brooks, Alberta	(Alberta) Kevin Martin	(Ontario) Wayne Middaugh
Yukon Title Curling Classic	Nov. 8-11	Fairbanks, Alaska	(United States) Jason Larway	(British Columbia) Stu Harris
Duluth Cash Spiel	Nov. 9-12	Duluth, Minnesota	(Ontario) Jeff Currie	(United States) Craig Brown
Whites Drug Store Classic	Nov. 9-12	Swan River, Manitoba	(Saskatchewan) Joel Jordison	(Saskatchewan) Darrell McKee
Best Western Wayside Inn Curling Classic	Nov. 9-12	Lloydminster, Alberta	(Manitoba) Jeff Stoughton	(Ontario) Glenn Howard
Lucerne Curling Trophy	Nov. 15-18	Luzern, Switzerland	(Norway) Thomas Ulsrud	(Scotland) Tom Brewster
Pharmasave Gimli Classic	Nov. 16-18	Gimli, Manitoba	(Manitoba) Chris Galbraith	(Manitoba) Daley Peters
Roaming Buffalo Classic	Nov. 16-18	Wainwright, Alberta	(Alberta) Adrian Bakker	(Alberta) Shane Park
McDonald's Invitational	Nov. 16-19	Brantford, Ontario	(Ontario) Glenn Howard	(Ontario) Kirk Ziola
Challenge Casino De Charlevoix	Nov. 21-25	Clermont, Quebec	(Ontario) Peter Steski	(Quebec) Robert Desjardins
Skookum/WCT Yukon Cash Spiel	Nov. 22-25	Whitehorse, Yukon	(British Columbia) Steve Waatainen	(Alberta) Ron Chrenek
Interlake Pharmacy Classic	Nov. 22-26	Stonewall, Manitoba	(Manitoba) Kerry Burtnyk	(Manitoba) Vic Peters
BDO Classic Canadian Open	Nov. 28-Dec. 2	Quebec, Quebec	(Alberta) Kevin Martin	(Nova Scotia) Shawn Adams
Grande Prairie Cash Spiel	Nov. 30-Dec. 2	Grande Prairie, Alberta	(Alberta) Jeff Erickson	(Alberta) James Pahl
Dauphin Clinic Pharmacy Cash Spiel	Nov. 30-Dec. 3	Dauphin, Manitoba	(Manitoba) Chris Galbraith	(Manitoba) Reid Carruthers
Morgan Stanley Curling Classic	Nov. 30-Dec. 2	Madison, Wisconsin	(United States) Craig Brown	(Ontario) Trevor Bonot
Point Optical Charity Curling Classic	Dec. 7-10	Saskatoon, Saskatchewan	(Saskatchewan) Randy Woytowich	(Saskatchewan) Darrell McKee
John Shea Insurance Canada Cup Qualifier	Dec. 12-16	Ottawa, Ontario	(Alberta) Kevin Koe	(Manitoba) Mike McEwen
Curl Mesabi Cash Spiel	Dec. 14-16	Eveleth, Minnesota	(United States) Pete Fenson	(United States) Craig Brown
The National	Dec. 20-23	Port Hawkesbury, Nova Scotia	(Alberta) Kevin Martin	(Alberta) Kevin Koe
Ramada Perth Masters	Jan. 3-6	Perth, Scotland	(Ontario) Glenn Howard	(Manitoba) Kerry Burtnyk
Masters of Curling	Jan. 23-27	Saskatoon, Saskatchewan	(Ontario) Glenn Howard	(Alberta) Kevin Koe
Prague Grand Prix	Jan. 31-Feb. 1	Prague, Czech Republic	(Italy) Stefano Ferronato	(Finland) Markku Uusipaavalniemi
Bear Mountain Arena Classic	Apr. 3-6	Victoria, British Columbia	(British Columbia) Bob Ursel	(Ontario) Wayne Middaugh
Tylenol Players Championship	Apr. 15-20	St. John's, Newfoundland and Labrador	(Ontario) Glenn Howard	(Alberta) Kevin Martin

== Women's World Curling Tour winners ==
Event	Date	Location	Winning skip	Runner-up skip
BDO Galt Curling Classic	Sept. 17-23	Cambridge, Ontario	(Ontario) Julie Reddick	(Ontario) Colleen Madonia
Radisson SAS Oslo Cup	Sept. 20-23	Oslo, Norway	(Manitoba) Jennifer Jones	(Saskatchewan) Sherry Anderson
AMJ Campbell Shorty Jenkins Classic	Sept. 20-23	Brockville, Ontario	(United States) Debbie McCormick	(Quebec) Ève Bélisle
Boston Pizza September Shoot-Out	Sept. 21-23	Edmonton, Alberta	(China) Wang Bingyu	(Alberta) Glenys Bakker
Twin Anchors Houseboat Cashspiel	Sept. 27-30	Vernon, British Columbia	(Alberta) Heather Rankin	(Alberta) Shannon Kleibrink
**Trail Appliances Autumn Gold**	**Oct. 5-9**	**Calgary, Alberta**	**(Manitoba) Jennifer Jones**	(Alberta) **Shannon Kleibrink**
Women's Masters Basel	Oct. 12-14	Basel, Switzerland	(Sweden) Anette Norberg	(Scotland) Edith Loudon
Meyers Norris Penny Charity Classic	Oct. 12-15	Medicine Hat, Alberta	(Japan) Moe Meguro	(Alberta) Carly Quigley
Southwestern Ontario Women's Charity Cashspiel	Oct. 12-15	London, Ontario	(Ontario) Rachel Homan	(Quebec) Ève Bélisle
Coupe Quebec La Cage aux Sports	Oct. 18-21	Quebec, Quebec	(Quebec) Ève Bélisle	(Quebec) Veronique Brassard
**Casinos of Winnipeg Classic**	**Oct. 19-22**	**Winnipeg, Manitoba**	**(Alberta) Shannon Kleibrink**	**(Manitoba) Jennifer Jones**
Zurich Women's Masters	Oct. 19-21	Zürich, Switzerland	(Switzerland) Irene Schori	(Switzerland) Binia Feltscher-Beeli
Strauss Crown of Curling	Oct. 19-22	Kamloops, British Columbia	(British Columbia) Kelly Scott	(British Columbia) Marla Mallett
Colonial Square Ladies Classic	Oct. 26-29	Saskatoon, Saskatchewan	(Saskatchewan) Stefanie Lawton	(Alberta) Cathy King
Stockholm Ladies Cup	Nov. 1-4	Stockholm, Sweden	(Sweden) Anette Norberg	(Sweden) Anna Hasselborg
Red Deer Curling Classic	Nov. 1-4	Red Deer, Alberta	(Manitoba) Jennifer Jones	(Alberta) Kristie Moore
Royal Lepage OVCA Women's Fall Classic	Nov. 2-4	Ottawa, Ontario	(Ontario) Jenn Hanna	(Ontario) Tracy Samaan
Duluth Cash Spiel	Nov. 9-12	Duluth, Minnesota	(United States) Patti Lank	(Manitoba) Patti Burtnyk
**Wayden Transportation Ladies Classic**	**Nov. 16-19**	**Abbotsford, British Columbia**	**(British Columbia) Kelly Scott**	**(Saskatchewan) Stefanie Lawton**
Sun Life Invitational	Nov. 16-19	Brantford, Ontario	(Ontario) Julie Hastings	(Ontario) Krista McCarville
Interlake Pharmacy Classic	Nov. 22-26	Stonewall, Manitoba	(Manitoba) Joelle Brown	(Manitoba) Barb Spencer
CUETS Schmirler Charity Classic	Nov. 23-26	Regina, Saskatchewan	(Saskatchewan) Jolene McIvor	(Saskatchewan) Michelle Englot
International ZO Women's Tournament	Nov. 23-25	Wetzikon, Switzerland	(Switzerland) Mirjam Ott	(Russia) Ludmila Privivkova
**Sobeys Slam**	**Nov. 29-Dec. 2**	**New Glasgow, Nova Scotia**	(Ontario) **Sherry Middaugh**	(Quebec) **Marie-France Larouche**
Boundary Ford Classic	Nov. 30-Dec. 3	Lloydminster, Alberta	(Alberta) Faye White	(Alberta) Chana Martineau
Diversified Transportation Canada Cup Qualifier	Dec. 12-16	Edmonton, Alberta	(Alberta) Cheryl Bernard	(Ontario) Sherry Middaugh
International Ladies Bernese Cup	Jan. 11-13	Bern, Switzerland	(British Columbia) Kelly Scott	(Scotland) Kelly Wood
Braehead Ladies International	Jan. 18-20	Glasgow, Scotland	(Scotland) Gail Munro	(Scotland) Kelly Wood
**Tylenol Players Championship**	**Apr. 15-20**	**St. John's, Newfoundland and Labrador**	**(Saskatchewan) Amber Holland**	**(Ontario) Krista McCarville**

Events in bold indicate Grand Slam events.

== WCT Money Ranking ==
#	Men's teams	$ (CAD)
1	Kevin Martin	127,000
2	Glenn Howard	126,795
3	Kevin Koe	109,785
4	Wayne Middaugh	83,500
5	Randy Ferbey	76,750
6	Kerry Burtnyk	73,729
7	Jeff Stoughton	71,000
8	Pat Simmons	55,000
9	Shawn Adams	43,000
10	Bob Ursel; Greg McAulay	42,500

== Sources ==
Preceded by 2006–07	2007–08 curling season September 2007 – April 2008	Succeeded by 2008–09
