= 2008–09 curling season =

- Sport: Curling

Seasons
- ← 2007–08 2009–10 →

The 2008-09 curling season began in September 2008 and ended in April 2009.

== Season of Champions top three finishes ==
(Only team's skip listed)

Event	Winner	Runner-up	Third place
Canadian Mixed	Manitoba (Grassie)	Ontario (Tuck)	Saskatchewan (McKee)
Continental Cup	(United Nations) World	(Canada) (United States) North America	
TSN Skins Game	(Alberta) Randy Ferbey	(Ontario) Glenn Howard	(Manitoba) Jennifer Jones (Alberta) Kevin Martin
Canadian Juniors (men's)	Prince Edward Island (Gallant)	Northern Ontario (Johnston)	Alberta (Yablonski)
Canadian Juniors (women's)	Manitoba (Lawes)	Ontario (Homan)	Alberta (Scheidegger)
Scotties Tournament of Hearts	Canada (Jones)	British Columbia (Mallett)	Quebec (Larouche)
Tim Hortons Brier	Alberta (Martin)	Manitoba (Stoughton)	Ontario (G. Howard)
World Junior Championships (men's)	Denmark (Stjern)	Canada (Gallant)	United States (Plys)
World Junior Championships (women's)	Scotland (E. Muirhead)	Canada (Lawes)	Switzerland (Baumann)
Canada Cup (men's)	(Alberta) Kevin Martin	(Alberta) Randy Ferbey	(Manitoba) Jeff Stoughton
Canada Cup (women's)	(Alberta) Shannon Kleibrink	(Quebec) Marie-France Larouche	(Alberta) Cheryl Bernard
Canadian Seniors (men's)	Ontario (Delaney)	New Brunswick (R. Howard)	Prince Edward Island (M. Bernard)
Canadian Seniors (women's)	Nova Scotia (Pinkney)	British Columbia (Smiley)	Manitoba (Fowler)
Women's World Championships	China (Wang B.)	Sweden (Norberg)	Denmark (Jensen)
Men's World Championships	Scotland (Murdoch)	Canada (Martin)	Norway (Ulsrud)

== Other events ==
Event	Winner	Runner-up	Third place
European Mixed	Germany (Schöpp)	Czech Republic (Snítil)	Sweden (Edin)
Pacific Championships (men's)	China (Wang F.)	Japan (Morozumi)	New Zealand (Becker)
Pacific Championships (women's)	China (Wang B.)	South Korea (Kim MY)	Japan (Meguro)
World Wheelchair Qualification	Germany (Jäger)	China (Wang H.)	Russia (Romanov)
European Championships (men's)	Scotland (Murdoch)	Norway (Ulsrud)	Germany (Kapp)
European Championships (women's)	Switzerland (Ott)	Sweden (Norberg)	Denmark (Jensen)
European Junior Challenge (men's)	Scotland (G. Muirhead)	Russia (Drosdov)	France (Vincent)
European Junior Challenge (women's)	France (Coulout)	Czech Republic (Kubeskova)	Italy (Apollonio)
Pacific Juniors (men's)	China (Zang)	South Korea (Kim HT)	New Zealand (Miller)
Pacific Juniors (women's)	Japan (Fujiwasa)	China (Liu)	South Korea (Gim)
USA-Brazil Challenge	United States (Birr)	Brazil (Mello)	
European Youth Olympic Festival (men's)	Switzerland (Gulka)	United Kingdom (Dick)	Norway (Rølvåg)
European Olympic Youth Festival (women's)	United Kingdom (Sloan)	Switzerland (Iten)	Denmark (de Neergaard)
Winter Universiade (men's)	Sweden (Edin)	Norway (Løvold)	China (Wang F.)
Winter Universiade (women's)	China (Wang B.)	Canada (Nicol)	Russia (Privivkova)
World Wheelchair Championship	Canada (Armstrong)	Sweden (Jungell)	Germany (Jäger)
Mixed Doubles	Switzerland (Müller, Schori)	Hungary (Nagy, Szekeres)	Canada (Grassie, Nimik)
World Seniors (men's)	Canada (Hritzuk)	United States (Pustovar)	Scotland (Prentice)
World Seniors (women's)	Canada (Sanders)	Switzerland (Nedkoff)	Sweden (Meldahl)

== World Curling Tour winners ==
Event	Date	Location	Winning skip	Runner-up skip
Baden Masters	Sept 5-7	Baden, SUI	(Norway) Thomas Ulsrud	(Scotland) David Murdoch
Boston Pizza Shootout	Sept 18-21	Edmonton, Alta	(Alberta) Ted Appelman	(Saskatchewan) Pat Simmons
AMJ Campbell Shorty Jenkins Classic	Sept 18-21	Brockville, Ont	(Ontario) Richard Hart	(Manitoba) Kerry Burtnyk
Radisson SAS Oslo Cup	Sept 25-28	Oslo, NOR	(Norway) Thomas Ulsrud	(Canada) Kevin Martin
Twin Anchors Houseboat Cash Spiel	Oct 2-5	Vernon, BC	(British Columbia) Bob Ursel	(British Columbia) Sean Geall
Swiss Cup Basel	Oct 3-6	Basel, SUI	(Canada) Brad Gushue	(Switzerland) Ralph Stöckli
Manitoba Lotteries Men's Curling Classic	Oct 10-13	Brandon, Man.	(Manitoba) Jeff Stoughton	(Saskatchewan) Joel Jordison
PriceWaterhouseCoopers Westcoast Curling Classic	Oct 10-13	New Westminster, BC	(Alberta) Kevin Martin	(Alberta) Randy Ferbey
BDO Curling Classic	Oct 10-13	Oakville, Ont.	(Ontario) Glenn Howard	(Ontario) Mark Bice
St. Paul Cashspiel	Oct 17-20	St. Paul, MN	(United States) Pete Fenson	(Canada) Bryan Burgess
Meyers Norris Penny Charity Classic	Oct 17-20	Medicine Hat, Alta.	(Alberta) Ted Appelman	(Saskatchewan) Randy Bryden
Bern Open	Oct 17-29	Bern, SUI	(Germany) Andy Kapp	(Switzerland) Ralph Stöckli
Strauss Crown of Curling	Oct 17-20	Kamloops, BC	(British Columbia) Rick Folk	(Alberta) Kevin Koe
Coupe Quebec	Oct 23-27	Quebec City, Que	(Quebec) Guy Hemmings	(Ontario) Bryan Cochrane
Meyers Norris Penny Prairie Classic	Oct 24-27	Portage la Prairie, Man.	(Ontario) Glenn Howard	(Saskatchewan) Brad Heidt
Flint Energy Classic	Oct 24-27	Bonnyville, Alta	(Alberta) Kevin Martin	(Alberta) Jamie King
Cactus Pheasant Classic	Oct 30-Nov 2	Brooks, Alta	(Ontario) Glenn Howard	(Alberta) Kevin Martin
Red Deer Curling Classic	Oct 30-Nov 2	Red Deer, Alta	(Alberta) Ted Appelman	(Alberta) Dan Petryk
Yukon Title Curling Classic	Nov 6-9	Fairbanks, AK	(United States) Leland Rich	(United States) Greg Persinger
Duluth Cash Spiel	Nov 7-10	Duluth, MN	(United States) Craig Brown	(Canada) Randy Neufeld
Best Western Wayside Inn Curling Classic	Nov 7-10	Lloydminster, Alta	(Alberta) Kevin Martin	(Saskatchewan) Warren Hassall
Whites Drug Store Curling Classic	Nov 7-10	Swan River, Man.	(Manitoba) Allan Lyburn	(Manitoba) Kelly Skinner
Lucerne Curling Trophy	Nov 13-16	Lucerne, SUI	(Switzerland) Andreas Schwaller	(Switzerland) Stefan Karnusian
Masters of Curling	Nov 14-16	Waterloo, Ont	(Ontario) Glenn Howard	(Alberta) Kevin Koe
Interlake Pharmacy Classic	Nov 20-24	Stonewall, Man.	(Manitoba) Jeff Stoughton	(Manitoba) Allan Lyburn
Skookum WCT Cash Spiel	Nov 20-23	Whitehorse, Yukon	(Alberta) Chris Schille	(United States) Jason Larway
Wainwright Roaming Buffalo Classic	Nov 21-24	Wainwright, Alta	(Alberta) Shane Park	(Alberta) Ted Appelman
SunLife Financial Invitational Classic	Nov 21-24	Brantford, Ont.	(Ontario) Glenn Howard	(Quebec) Jean-Michel Ménard
Challenge Casino de Charlevoix	Nov 26-30	Clermont, Que.	(China) Wang Fengchun	(Ontario) Peter Steski
Seattle Cash Spiel	Nov 28-30	Seattle, WA	(United States) Mark Johnson	(Canada) Ken Watson
Dauphin Clinic Pharmacy Classic	Nov 28-Dec 1	Dauphin, Man.	(Manitoba) Brendan Taylor	(Manitoba) Terry McNamee
PointOptical Curling Classic	Nov 28-Dec 1	Saskatoon, Sask.	(Saskatchewan) Eugene Hritzuk	(Saskatchewan) Joel Jordison
Scottish Open	Nov 28-30	Edinburgh, SCO	(Germany) Andy Kapp	(Sweden) Goran Carlsson
The Korbel Championship	Dec 5-7	Madison, WI	(United States) Greg Romaniuk	(United States) Pete Fenson
The National	Dec 5-7	Quebec City, Que.	(Ontario) Wayne Middaugh	(Newfoundland and Labrador) Brad Gushue
Diversified Transportation Canada Cup Qualifier	Dec 11-15	Edmonton, Alta.	(British Columbia) Bob Ursel	(Alberta) Kevin Martin
Super One Shoot-out @ Curl Mesabi	Dec 19-21	Eveleth, MN	(United States) Tyler George	(United States) Cassandra Potter
Ramada Perth Masters	Jan 8-11	Perth, SCO	(Canada) Kevin Koe	(Norway) Thomas Ulsrud
BDO Canadian Open of Curling	Jan 22-25	Winnipeg, Man.	(Ontario) Glenn Howard	(Alberta) Kevin Martin
Prague Grand Prix	Jan 30-Feb 1	Prague, CZE	(Canada) Chris Schille	(Switzerland) Jan Hauser
DeKalb Superspiel	Mar 19-23	Morris, Man.	(Manitoba) Vic Peters	(Manitoba) Randy Dutiaume
Bear Mountain Arena Classic	Mar 26-29	Victoria, BC	(Ontario) Wayne Middaugh	(Manitoba) Mike McEwen
Grey Power Players' Championship	Apr 14-19	Grande Prairie, Alta.	(Alberta) Randy Ferbey	(Ontario) Glenn Howard

== Women's World Curling Tour winners ==
Event	Date	Location	Winning skip	Runner-up skip
Boston Pizza Shootout	Sept. 18-21	Edmonton, AB	(Switzerland) Mirjam Ott	(China) Wang Bingyu
AMJ Campbell Shorty Jenkins Classic	Sept. 18-21	Brockville, ON	(Quebec) Marie-France Larouche	(Quebec) Ève Bélisle
Radisson SAS Oslo Cup	Sept. 25-28	Oslo, Norway	(Scotland) Kelly Wood	(Sweden) Anette Norberg
CUETS Schmirler Curling Classic	Sept 26-29	Regina, SK	(Alberta) Shannon Kleibrink	(Ontario) Krista McCarville
Twin Anchors Houseboat Cashspiel	Oct. 2-5	Vernon, BC	(Alberta) Shannon Kleibrink	(British Columbia) Kelly Scott
RE/MAX Women's Masters Basel	Oct. 10-12	Basel, Switzerland	(Sweden) Anette Norberg	(Scotland) Edith Loudon
Trail Appliances Curling Classic	Oct. 10-13	Calgary, AB	(Alberta) Shannon Kleibrink	(Alberta) Cheryl Bernard
Strauss Crown of Curling	Oct. 17-20	Kamloops, BC	(South Korea) Kim Mi-Yeon	(British Columbia) Marla Mallett
Meyers Norris Penny Charity Classic	Oct. 17-20	Medicine Hat, AB	(Alberta) Casey Scheidegger	(Alberta) Lisa Johnson
Zurich Women's Masters	Oct 17-19	Zürich, Switzerland	(Germany) Andrea Schöpp	(Switzerland) Michèle Jäggi
Southwestern Ontario Women's Charity Cashspiel	Oct 17-20	London, ON	(Ontario) Rachel Homan	(China) Wang Bingyu
Coupe Quebec	Oct. 23-27	Quebec City, QC	(Quebec) Marie-France Larouche	(Quebec) Allison Ross
Casinos of Winnipeg Classic	Oct. 24-27	Winnipeg, MB	(Saskatchewan) Michelle Englot	(British Columbia) Kelly Scott
Stockholm Ladies Cup	Oct. 30-Nov. 2	Stockholm, Sweden	(Sweden) Stina Viktorsson	(Switzerland) Binia Feltscher-Beeli
Red Deer Curling Classic	Oct. 30-Nov. 2	Red Deer, AB	(Alberta) Cheryl Bernard	(Alberta) Shannon Kleibrink
Duluth Cash Spiel	Nov. 7-10	Duluth, MN	(Ontario) Krista McCarville	(United States) Amy Wright
Colonial Square Ladies Classic	Nov. 7-10	Saskatoon, SK	(Saskatchewan) Stefanie Lawton	(Saskatchewan) Michelle Englot
Royal Lepage OVCA Women's Fall Classic	Nov. 7-9	Kemptville, ON	(Ontario) Rachel Homan	(Ontario) Sherry Middaugh
Wayden Transportation Ladies Classic	Nov. 14-17	Winnipeg, MB	(Manitoba) Jennifer Jones	(Saskatchewan) Stefanie Lawton
Interlake Pharmacy Classic	Nov. 20-24	Stonewall, MB	(Manitoba) Kim Link	(Manitoba) Kerri Flett
SunLife Financial Invitational Classic	Nov. 21-24	Brantford, ON	(Quebec) Marie-France Larouche	(Ontario) Jacqueline Harrison
Sobeys Slam	Nov. 27-30	New Glasgow, NS	(Quebec) Marie-France Larouche	(Saskatchewan) Stefanie Lawton
VCC Ladies Totem Cashspiel	Nov. 28-30	Vancouver, BC	(British Columbia) Marla Mallett	(British Columbia) Ashleigh Clark
International ZO Women's Tournament	Nov. 28-30	Wetzikon, Switzerland	(Switzerland) Mirjam Ott	(Switzerland) Marlene Albrecht
Boundary Ford Curling Classic	Nov. 28-Dec. 1	Lloydminster, AB	(Alberta) Kristie Moore	(Alberta) Andrea McCutcheon
John Shea Insurance Canada Cup Qualifier	Dec. 11-15	Ottawa, ON	(Quebec) Marie-France Larouche	(Saskatchewan) Amber Holland
International Bernese Ladies Cup	Jan. 9-11	Bern, Switzerland	(Alberta) Shannon Kleibrink	(Germany) Andrea Schöpp
Glynhill Ladies International	Jan. 16-19	Glasgow, Scotland	(Manitoba) Jennifer Jones	(Switzerland) Binia Feltscher-Beeli
DEKALB Superspiel	Mar. 13-19	Morris, MB	(Alberta) Crystal Webster	(Quebec) Ève Bélisle
Players' Championships	Apr. 14-19	Grande Prairie, AB	(Manitoba) Jennifer Jones	(Alberta) Shannon Kleibrink

== WCT Money Ranking ==
#	Men's teams	$ (CAD)
1	Glenn Howard	140,400
2	Kevin Martin	132,553
3	Randy Ferbey	92,000
4	Wayne Middaugh	76,594
5	Brad Gushue	75,624
6	Mike McEwen	62,100
7	Jeff Stoughton	62,000
8	Kevin Koe	60,366
9	Kerry Burtnyk	51,052
10	Chris Schille	45,417

Preceded by 2007–08	2008–09 curling season September 2008 – April 2009	Succeeded by 2009–10
