= Ted Appelman =

Canadian curler

- Curler
- Born: August 27, 1980 (age 46); Edmonton, Alberta

Team
- Curling club: Avonair CC, Edmonton, AB

Curling career
- Member Association: Alberta
- Brier: 3 (2019, 2020, 2023)
- World Championship: 1 (2019)
Medal record
Men's curling
Representing Canada
World Men's Curling Championship
| Silver medal – second place | 2019 Lethbridge |
Representing Alberta
Tim Hortons Brier
| Gold medal – first place | 2019 Brandon |

Ted Appelman (born August 27, 1980) is a Canadian curler from Edmonton, Alberta, and the brother of fellow curler Tom Appelman. He is currently the coach of the Selena Sturmay rink.

== Career ==
Appelman has made most of his successes to date as a skip, during the 2008–09 season and the 2009–10 season. His team was invited to participate in the 2009 Canada Cup of Curling, where he finished with a 1–4 record. His successes during that season qualified the team for the 2009 Canadian Olympic Pre-Trials, where he lost in the C-qualifier semi-final to Bob Ursel. Coming from a very competitive province, Appelman has never made to the Brier, but he lost in the semi-final at the 2010 Boston Pizza Cup (Alberta's provincial championship) in an attempt to do so.

On the World Curling Tour, Appelman and his rink have won four career tour events. In 2008 they won the Boston Pizza Shootout, the Meyers Norris Penny Charity Classic and the Red Deer Curling Classic and in 2009 they won the Kamloops Crown of Curling. His top Grand Slam event was the 2009 Players' Championships where his team lost in the quarterfinals.

Appelman also represented Alberta at the 2007 Canadian Mixed Curling Championship (held in 2006), where his Alberta rink finished the round robin with a 7–4 record, but lost in a tie breaker.

In 2011–2012, he joined forces with Randy Ferbey, David Nedohin and Brendan Melnyk. After a successful World Curling Tour season, the team failed to qualify for Northern Alberta Regionals, losing in the Edmonton Zones to Kevin Park. At the conclusion of the season, the team disbanded as Ferbey retired and Nedohin formed a new team.

== Personal life ==
Appelman is married and has two children. He works as a process operator for Umicore Canada.

== Grand Slam record ==
Key
| C | Champion |
| F | Lost in Final |
| SF | Lost in Semifinal |
| QF | Lost in Quarterfinals |
| R16 | Lost in the round of 16 |
| Q | Did not advance to playoffs |
| T2 | Played in Tier 2 event |
| DNP | Did not participate in event |
| N/A | Not a Grand Slam event that season |

| Event | 2007–08 | 2008–09 | 2009–10 | 2010–11 | 2011–12 | 2012–13 | 2013–14 |
|---|---|---|---|---|---|---|---|
| Masters | Q | DNP | DNP | Q | Q | DNP | DNP |
| The National | Q | DNP | Q | Q | DNP | DNP | DNP |
| Canadian Open | DNP | DNP | DNP | DNP | Q | DNP | DNP |
| Players' | DNP | QF | Q | Q | DNP | DNP | DNP |
