= Crystal Rumberg =

Canadian curler

- Curler
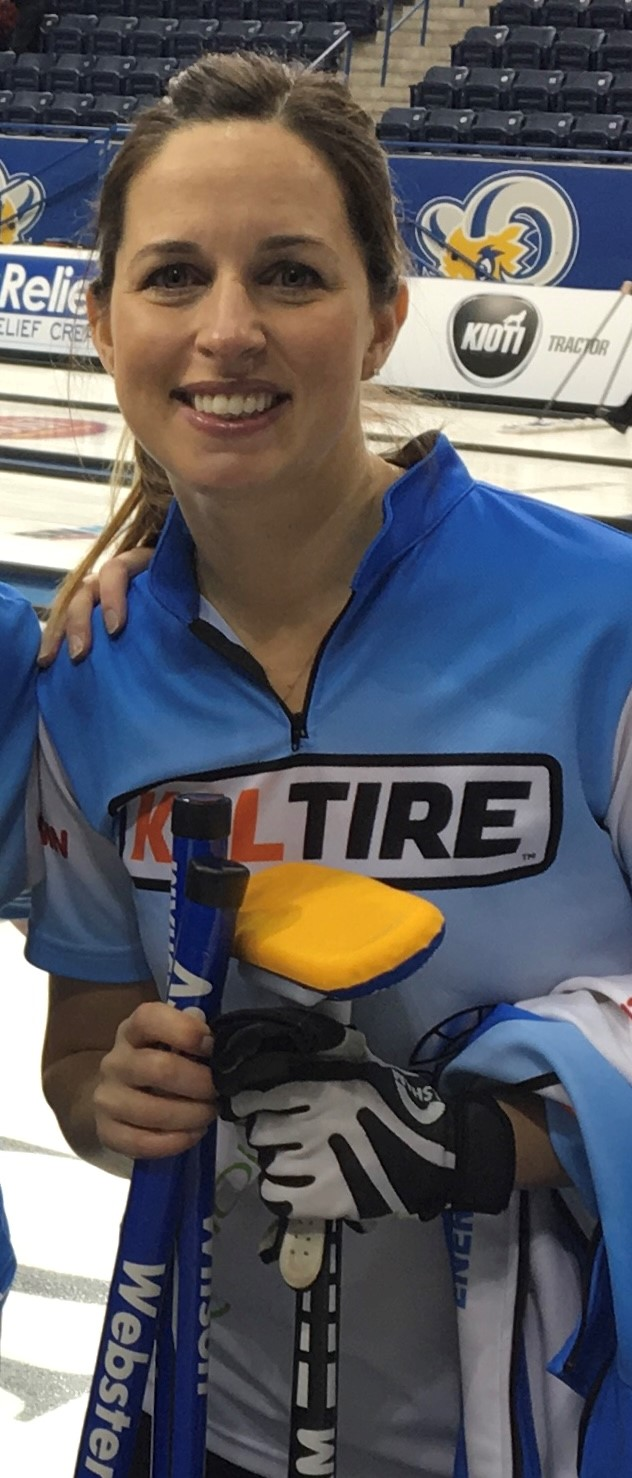
- Rumberg at the 2017 Players' Championship
- Born: Crystal Rumberg; February 26, 1975 (age 51); Medicine Hat, Alberta

Team
- Curling club: The Glencoe Club, Calgary, Alberta

Curling career
- Member Association: Alberta (1994–2015; 2018–present); Northern Ontario (2015–2018)
- Hearts: 5 (2011, 2018, 2023, 2025, 2026)
- Top CTRS ranking: 7th (2011–12, 2015–16, 2016–17)

Crystal Rumberg, also known as Crystal Webster (born February 26, 1975, in Medicine Hat, Alberta) is a Canadian curler from Calgary, Alberta.

== Career ==
=== Juniors ===
Rumberg made her national curling debut at the 1994 Canadian Junior Curling Championships. This would be her first and only appearance at the junior championships. She was skipping her own team, representing Alberta at the championship. They would miss the playoffs, finishing round robin with a 6–5 record.

=== 1998–2001 ===
In 1998 Rumberg joined up with and played lead for Calgary skip Cheryl Bernard. The team would have a successful year, finishing third in the Husky Autumn Gold Classic, second in the Saskatoon Classic, winning the Skyreach Curling Classic and finished second place on the curling tour money list. The following year the team would win the JVC curling classic, and were finalists in the TSN Women's Skins game.

In 2000 the team would have their first successful run at the Alberta Scott Tournament of Hearts, where they would make it all the way to the final before losing to Heather Godberson. The team would participate in the Player's Championship, would give an Olympic Trials Berth. The team would end up losing the final. After the 2000/01 season she left the team.

=== 2009–2015 ===
In 2009, her team was the first qualifier at the Canadian Olympic Pre-Trials. She surprised many, winning the A final over former World Champion Kelly Scott. At the 2009 Canadian Olympic Curling Trials, the rink finished with a 2–5 record.

In her career, she only won two Women's World Curling Tour events, the DEKALB Superspiel in 2009 and the Colonial Square Ladies Classic in 2011. She has made it to two Grand Slam finals. She lost the 2006 Autumn Gold Slam to Kelly Scott and the 2010 Players' Championships to Cheryl Bernard.

She made her first Scotties appearance as the alternate for Shannon Kleibrink, for the 2011 Scotties Tournament of Hearts. The team finished outside of the playoffs with a 6–5 record.

It was at the 2011 Scotties Tournament of Hearts where she approached Geri-Lynn Ramsay and Erin Carmody, who had played with Kathy O'Rourke from 2009 to 2011 in Prince Edward Island, having great success at the 2010 Scotties Tournament of Hearts finishing first in round robin play, and losing the final, asking them to join her team for the 2011-12 curling season. Ramsay was planning to relocate to Calgary with her boyfriend, while Carmody was planning to attend school. The team finished within the top five in five of the world curling tour events they participated in.

At the 2012 Alberta Scotties Tournament of Hearts the team qualified out of the fourth qualified for the playoffs. To do so, they successfully eliminated the defending Alberta champions Shannon Kleibrink. The team would defeat Valerie Sweeting 5–4 in the C1 vs C2 game, and faced Heather Nedohin in the semi-final. They were ahead 5–4 in the tenth end, with hammer and would end up giving up a steal of one to be tied 5-5. In the eleventh end, again with the hammer, they would give up another steal, allowing Nedohin to win the semi-final and eventually the Alberta championship.

At the end of the 2011-12 curling season, the team would finish in seventh place on the Canadian Team Ranking System (CTRS) which was enough to earn the final place in the 2012 Canada Cup of Curling, with the winning team to get a direct entry into the 2013 Canadian Olympic Curling Trials. The team finished the event with a 3–3 record.

At the 2013 Alberta Scotties Tournament of Hearts, her team won just one game. Following the season, she added Cathy Overton-Clapham to the lineup for the 2013–14 curling season, replacing Erin Carmody who moved to Laura Crocker's Edmonton rink. The team played in the Canadian Olympic Curling Trials Qualifying tournament where they just won one game. The team made the playoffs at the 2014 Alberta Scotties Tournament of Hearts, but lost to Cheryl Bernard in the 3 vs. 4 game.

Rumberg would once again have a lineup change for the 2014–15 curling season. Her new lineup consisted of Jessie Kaufman playing fourth stones, Geri-Lynn Ramsay still at second and Rebecca Konschuh at lead. At the 2015 Alberta Scotties Tournament of Hearts, the team had a pretty good week but lost the "C Qualifier" to Chelsea Carey.

=== 2015–2018 ===
After the conclusion of the 2014–15 season, Rumberg announced she would be joining the Tracy Fleury rink from Sudbury, Ontario. The team would have a five-player rotation due to work commitments. The team found success early, advancing all the way to the semifinal of the 2015 Tour Challenge Grand Slam. They finished the round robin with a 2–2 record with wins over Eve Muirhead and Kim Eun-jung, qualifying for a tiebreaker. The team stole the 8th end of the tiebreaker against Chelsea Carey and went on to defeat Sherry Middaugh in the quarterfinal. They were defeated by Switzerland's Silvana Tirinzoni 9–7 in the semifinal to end their run in the slam. It marked the first time Fleury advanced to the semifinal of a Slam. Although the team struggled at the next Slam, The Masters, finishing with a 1–3 record, they quickly rebounded and made it all the way to the final of The National. Up 4–3 without hammer in the eighth and final end, the team forced Rachel Homan to execute a difficult draw to the four-foot through a port to win, which was made. A month later, they played in the 2015 Canada Cup of Curling, where they went 1–5. In their next slam, the team lost in the quarterfinals of the 2015 Meridian Canadian Open. In playdowns, the team failed in their attempt to repeat as Northern Ontario champions, losing to Krista McCarville in the final. They wrapped up their season at the 2016 Players' Championship, where they finished with a 1–4 record. The team's success from the season left them in seventh spot on the Canadian Team Ranking System.

Team Fleury began the 2016–17 Grand Slam season at the 2016 WFG Masters, going 1–3 at the event. A month later, the team lost in the quarterfinals of the 2016 Tour Challenge. Later that month, they picked up a win at The Sunova Spiel at East St. Paul World Curling Tour event. A week later, they played in the 2016 Canada Cup of Curling, which they finished with a 2–4 record. At their next slam, the 2016 National, they missed the playoffs again with a 1–3 record. They were more successful at the 2017 Meridian Canadian Open, where they lost in the quarterfinal. At the 2017 Northern Ontario Scotties Tournament of Hearts, they again lost in the final to the Krista McCarville rink. The team finished their season with another quarterfinal finish at the 2017 Players' Championship.

The team began the 2017–18 season at the 2017 Tour Challenge, where they finished with a winless 0–4 record. The next month, they picked up a tour event win at the Gord Carroll Curling Classic. After three seasons as one of the top teams in Canada, Team Fleury qualified for the 2017 Canadian Olympic Curling Pre-Trials as the number one seed. At the Pre-trials, they finished with a disappointing 2–4 record, missing the playoffs. A week later, the team rebounded by making it all the way to the semifinal of the 2017 National Grand Slam event. The team regrouped at the 2018 Northern Ontario Scotties Tournament of Hearts, defeating Krista McCarville in the final to qualify for the 2018 Scotties Tournament of Hearts. The team would finish round-robin and championship pool play with an 8–3 record, in fourth place and a spot in the playoffs. They would lose the 3 vs. 4 page playoff game to Mary-Anne Arsenault of Nova Scotia, eliminating them from the tournament. A few weeks later, the team announced they would disband at the end of the 2017–18 season, citing work and family commitments.

=== 2021–present ===
After a three-year hiatus, Rumberg began curling competitively once again during the 2021–22 season as alternate for Team Kayla Skrlik. The team qualified for the 2022 Alberta Scotties Tournament of Hearts where they finished in last place with a 1–6 record. The next season, they fared much better at the 2023 provincial championship, going undefeated through the round robin to qualify for the final against Casey Scheidegger. The game went back and forth, with Skrlik making a highlight reel double takeout in the tenth end to score two and win the game 9–8. With the win, Team Skrlik represented Alberta at the 2023 Scotties Tournament of Hearts where they missed the playoffs with a 4–4 record.

== Personal life ==
She is employed as a mortgage specialist with RBC. She is married to Robert Galvin and has two children.

== Grand Slam record ==
Key
C	Champion
F	Lost in Final
SF	Lost in Semifinal
QF	Lost in Quarterfinals
R16	Lost in the round of 16
Q	Did not advance to playoffs
T2	Played in Tier 2 event
DNP	Did not participate in event
N/A	Not a Grand Slam event that season

Event	2006–07	2007–08	2008–09	2009–10	2010–11	2011–12	2012–13	2013–14	2014–15	2015–16	2016–17	2017–18
Masters	N/A	N/A	N/A	N/A	N/A	N/A	Q	DNP	DNP	Q	Q	DNP
Tour Challenge	N/A	N/A	N/A	N/A	N/A	N/A	N/A	N/A	N/A	SF	QF	Q
The National	N/A	N/A	N/A	N/A	N/A	N/A	N/A	N/A	N/A	F	Q	SF
Canadian Open	N/A	N/A	N/A	N/A	N/A	N/A	N/A	N/A	DNP	QF	QF	DNP
Players'	Q	DNP	Q	F	Q	DNP	DNP	Q	DNP	Q	QF	DNP

=== Former events ===
Event	2006–07	2007–08	2008–09	2009–10	2010–11	2011–12	2012–13	2013–14	2014–15
Autumn Gold	F	Q	Q	Q	Q	QF	Q	Q	Q
Colonial Square	N/A	N/A	N/A	N/A	N/A	N/A	R16	Q	Q
Manitoba Liquor & Lotteries	DNP	Q	Q	Q	DNP	DNP	Q	QF	N/A
Wayden Transportation	Q	Q	QF	N/A	N/A	N/A	N/A	N/A	N/A
Sobeys Slam	N/A	Q	QF	N/A	DNP	N/A	N/A	N/A	N/A
