= 2008 Sobeys Slam =

The 2008 Sobeys Slam was held November 27–30 at the John Brother MacDonald Stadium in New Glasgow, Nova Scotia. It was the fourth of five women's Grand Slam events during the 2008-09 curling season. It was the last Sobeys Slam before a one-year hiatus. It was also the second season where the event was a Slam. The total purse was $C 60,000 with $16,000 going to the champion Marie-France Larouche rink

== Teams ==
- (Nova Scotia) Mary-Anne Arsenault
- (Quebec) Ève Bélisle
- (Alberta) Cheryl Bernard
- (Prince Edward Island) Suzanne Birt
- (Prince Edward Island) Donna Butler
- (Ontario) Chrissy Cadorin
- (Ontario) Alison Goring
- (Ontario) Karri-Lee Grant
- (Saskatchewan) Amber Holland
- (Manitoba) Jennifer Jones
- (New Brunswick) Andrea Kelly
- (Alberta) Cathy King
- (Alberta) Shannon Kleibrink
- (United States) Patti Lank
- (Quebec) Marie-France Larouche
- (Saskatchewan) Stefanie Lawton
- (Ontario) Carrie Lindner
- (Ontario) Krista McCarville
- (Nova Scotia) Nancy McConnery
- (Ontario) Janet McGhee
- (Ontario) Sherry Middaugh
- (Nova Scotia) Jill Mouzar
- (Manitoba) Karen Porritt
- (Alberta) Heather Rankin
- (Ontario) Julie Reddick
- (New Brunswick) Sylvie Robichaud
- (British Columbia) Kelly Scott
- (Alberta) Renée Sonnenberg
- (United States) Aileen Sormunen
- (Newfoundland and Labrador) Heather Strong
- (China) Wang Bingyu
- (Alberta) Crystal Webster

=== Playoffs ===
Quarterfinals
(Alberta) King | 6
(Nova Scotia) Arsenault | 5
(Saskatchewan) Lawton | 9
(Alberta) Webster | 1
(Quebec) Larouche | 4
(China) Wang | 3
(Ontario) Middaugh | 7
(Alberta) Rankin | 5

Semifinals
(Alberta) King | 4
(Saskatchewan) Lawton | 5
(Quebec) Larouche | 7
(Ontario) Middaugh | 5

Finals
(Saskatchewan) Lawton | 3
(Quebec) Larouche | 7
