= 2010 Players' Championship =

Grand Slam of Curling event

2010 Grey Power Players' Championship
- Host city: Dawson Creek, British Columbia
- Arena: EnCana Events Centre
- Dates: April 13–18
- Men's winner: Kevin Martin
- Curling club: Saville SC, Edmonton
- Skip: Kevin Martin
- Third: John Morris
- Second: Marc Kennedy
- Lead: Ben Hebert
- Finalist: Brad Gushue
- Women's winner: Cheryl Bernard
- Curling club: Calgary WC, Calgary
- Skip: Cheryl Bernard
- Third: Susan O'Connor
- Second: Carolyn Darbyshire
- Lead: Cori Bartel
- Finalist: Crystal Webster

The 2010 Grey Power Players' Championship was the last Grand Slam event of both the World Curling Tour and Women's World Curling Tour for the 2009-10 season. This was the eighteenth time the event took place, and the fifth time since it was switched to joint men's/women's format. The event was held at the EnCana Events Centre in Dawson Creek, British Columbia April 13–18. It was the first Players' Championship since 2006 to feature international teams, as Canadian Olympic qualifying points were not on the line. The total purse for each event was $100,000.

Many of the top teams declined participation, due strain of the Olympic season. Only one international team participated, that being Sweden's Niklas Edin. Russia's Liudmila Privivkova was set to play in the women's event, but was unable to secure a travel visa.

== Men's event ==
=== Teams ===
Skip	Third	Second	Lead	Locale
Ted Appelman	Tom Appelman	Brandon Klassen	Brendan Melnyk	Edmonton
Chris Galbraith (Note: Skipped Team Reid Carruthers in his absence.)	Dave Elias	Derek Samagalski	Shane Kilgallen	Winnipeg
Niklas Edin	Sebastian Kraupp	Fredrik Lindberg	Viktor Kjäll	Karlstad
David Nedohin	Randy Ferbey (skip)	Scott Pfeifer	Marcel Rocque	Edmonton
Martin Ferland	François Roberge	Shawn Fowler	Maxime Elmaleh	Quebec City
Jason Gunnlaugson	Justin Richter	Braden Zawada	Tyler Forrest	Beausejour
Brad Gushue	Mark Nichols	Ryan Fry	Jamie Korab	St. John's
Brent Ross	Jake Higgs (skip)	Andrew Clayton	Micky Lizmore	Harriston
Glenn Howard	Richard Hart	Brent Laing	Craig Savill	Coldwater
Kevin Koe	Blake MacDonald	Carter Rycroft	Nolan Thiessen	Edmonton
Kevin Martin	John Morris	Marc Kennedy	Ben Hebert	Edmonton
Dale Matchett	Ryan Werenich	Jeff Gorda	Shawn Kaufman	Bradford
Mike McEwen	B. J. Neufeld	Matt Wozniak	Denni Neufeld	Winnipeg
Pat Simmons	Gerry Adam	Jeff Sharp	Steve Laycock	Davidson
Jeff Stoughton	Kevin Park	Rob Fowler	Steve Gould	Winnipeg
Jim Cotter	Bob Ursel (skip)	Tyrel Griffith	Rick Sawatsky	Kelowna

=== Results ===
==== A event ====
Quarterfinals
(Newfoundland and Labrador) Brad Gushue	8
(Quebec) Martin Ferland	4
(Alberta) Randy Ferbey	2
(Ontario) Dale Matchett	5
(Manitoba) Mike McEwen	1
(Saskatchewan) Pat Simmons	5
(Ontario) Glenn Howard	3
(Manitoba) Reid Carruthers	7

Semifinals
(Newfoundland and Labrador) Brad Gushue	7
(Ontario) Dale Matchett	4
(Saskatchewan) Pat Simmons	7
(Manitoba) Reid Carruthers	3

Qualifier 1
(Newfoundland and Labrador) Brad Gushue	6
(Saskatchewan) Pat Simmons	3

Quarterfinals
(Alberta) Kevin Martin	6
(Ontario) Jake Higgs	3
(Sweden) Niklas Edin	3
(British Columbia) Bob Ursel	8
(Alberta) Kevin Koe	7
(Alberta) Ted Appelman	6
(Manitoba) Jeff Stoughton	6
(Manitoba) Jason Gunnlaugson	5

Semifinals
(Alberta) Kevin Martin	9
(British Columbia) Bob Ursel	2
(Alberta) Kevin Koe	6
(Manitoba) Jeff Stoughton	4

Qualifier 2
(Alberta) Kevin Martin	6
(Alberta) Kevin Koe	2

==== B event ====
Quarterfinals		Semifinals		Qualifier 3
(Quebec) Martin Ferland	6
(Alberta) Randy Ferbey	8	(Alberta) Randy Ferbey	4
(Manitoba) Mike McEwen	3	(Ontario) Glenn Howard	8
(Ontario) Glenn Howard	7			(Ontario) Glenn Howard	6
				(Alberta) Kevin Koe	2

Quarterfinals		Semifinals		Qualifier 4
(Ontario) Jake Higgs	4
(Sweden) Niklas Edin	6	(Sweden) Niklas Edin	6
(Alberta) Ted Appelman	8	(Alberta) Ted Appelman	5
(Manitoba) Jason Gunnlaugson	4			(Sweden) Niklas Edin	4
				(Saskatchewan) Pat Simmons	9

Semifinals
1	(Ontario) Dale Matchett	2
4	(Manitoba) Reid Carruthers	7
3	(British Columbia) Bob Ursel	3
2	(Manitoba) Jeff Stoughton	6

Qualifier 5
(Manitoba) Reid Carruthers	1
(Manitoba) Jeff Stoughton	6

==== C Event ====
Quarterfinals		Semifinals		Qualifier 6
(Quebec) Martin Ferland	3
(Manitoba) Mike McEwen	7	(Manitoba) Mike McEwen	5
		(British Columbia) Bob Ursel	4
				(Manitoba) Mike McEwen	3
				(Sweden) Niklas Edin	6

Quarterfinals		Semifinals		Qualifier 7
(Ontario) Jake Higgs	3
(Manitoba) Jason Gunnlaugson	4	(Manitoba) Jason Gunnlaugson	8
		(Ontario) Dale Matchett	9
				(Ontario) Dale Matchett	3
				(Alberta) Kevin Koe	7

Semifinals		Qualifier 8
(Alberta) Randy Ferbey	9
(Alberta) Ted Appelman	4	(Alberta) Randy Ferbey	7
		(Manitoba) Reid Carruthers	1

==== Playoffs ====
(Note: Teams are seeded by their Order of Merit ranking)

Quarterfinals
1	(Alberta) Kevin Martin	7
15	(Sweden) Niklas Edin	5
6	(Manitoba) Jeff Stoughton	7
16	(Saskatchewan) Pat Simmons	1
3	(Newfoundland and Labrador) Brad Gushue	8
5	(Alberta) Randy Ferbey	3
2	(Ontario) Glenn Howard	3
7	(Alberta) Kevin Koe	5

Semifinals
1	(Alberta) Kevin Martin	6
6	(Manitoba) Jeff Stoughton	1
3	(Newfoundland and Labrador) Brad Gushue	6
7	(Alberta) Kevin Koe	4

Finals
1	(Alberta) Kevin Martin	8
3	(Newfoundland and Labrador) Brad Gushue	7

== Women's event ==
=== Teams ===
Skip	Third	Second	Lead	Locale
Ève Bélisle	Brenda Nicholls	Martine Comeau	Julie Rainville	Montreal
Cheryl Bernard	Susan O'Connor	Carolyn Darbyshire	Cori Bartel	Calgary
Chelsea Carey	Kristy Jenion	Kristen Foster	Lindsay Titheridge	Winnipeg
Kerri Flett	Janice Blair	Susan Baleja	Alison Harvey	Winnipeg
Jacqueline Harrison	Lori Eddy	Kimberly Tuck	Julie Columbus	Alliston
Julie Hastings	Christy Trombley	Stacey Smith	Katrina Collins	Toronto
Jolene Campbell (Note: Skipped Team Holland in the absence of Amber Holland.)	Kim Schneider	Tammy Schneider	Heather Kalenchuk	Kronau
Jennifer Jones	Cathy Overton-Clapham	Jill Officer	Dawn Askin	Winnipeg
Cathy King	Kaitlyn Lawes	Raylene Rocque	Tracy Bush	Edmonton
Shannon Kleibrink	Amy Nixon	Bronwen Webster	Chelsey Bell	Calgary
Stefanie Lawton	Sherry Anderson	Marliese Kasner	Lana Vey	Saskatoon
Heather Nedohin	Beth Iskiw	Jessica Mair	Pam Appelman	Edmonton
Jo-Ann Rizzo	Patti Lank	Lee Merklinger	Leigh Armstrong	Brantford
Kelly Scott	Jeanna Schraeder	Sasha Carter	Jacquie Armstrong	Kelowna
Val Sweeting	Leslie Rogers	Whitney More	Lindsay Makichuk	Edmonton
Crystal Webster	Lori Olson-Johns	Samantha Preston	Stephanie Malekoff	Calgary

=== Results ===
==== A event ====
Quarterfinals
(Saskatchewan) Amber Holland	3
(Ontario) Julie Hastings	4
(Saskatchewan) Stefanie Lawton	2
(Quebec) Ève Bélisle	6
(Alberta) Cheryl Bernard	6
(Ontario) Jacqueline Harrison	5
(Alberta) Cathy King	3
(Alberta) Heather Nedohin	6

Semifinals
(Ontario) Julie Hastings	1
(Quebec) Ève Bélisle	8
(Alberta) Cheryl Bernard	2
(Alberta) Heather Nedohin	8

Qualifier 1
(Quebec) Ève Bélisle	7
(Alberta) Heather Nedohin	6

Quarterfinals
(Manitoba) Jennifer Jones	7
(Manitoba) Chelsea Carey	3
(Ontario) Jo-Ann Rizzo	3
(Alberta) Crystal Webster	8
(British Columbia) Kelly Scott	6
(Manitoba) Kerri Flett	4
(Alberta) Shannon Kleibrink	6
(Alberta) Val Sweeting	5

Semifinals
(Manitoba) Jennifer Jones	7
(Alberta) Crystal Webster	6
(British Columbia) Kelly Scott	7
(Alberta) Shannon Kleibrink	6

Qualifier 2
(Manitoba) Jennifer Jones	2
(British Columbia) Kelly Scott	6

==== B event ====
Quarterfinals		Semifinals		Qualifier 3
(Saskatchewan) Amber Holland	3
(Saskatchewan) Stefanie Lawton	8	(Saskatchewan) Stefanie Lawton	5
(Ontario) Jacqueline Harrison	6	(Ontario) Jacqueline Harrison	4
(Alberta) Cathy King	5			(Saskatchewan) Stefanie Lawton	9
				(Manitoba) Jennifer Jones	1

Quarterfinals		Semifinals		Qualifier 4
(Manitoba) Chelsea Carey	4
(Ontario) Jo-Ann Rizzo	6	(Ontario) Jo-Ann Rizzo	6
(Manitoba) Kerri Flett	4	(Alberta) Val Sweeting	7
(Alberta) Val Sweeting	7			(Alberta) Val Sweeting	8
				(Alberta) Heather Nedohin	6

Qualifier 5
1	(Ontario) Julie Hastings	5
4	(Alberta) Cheryl Bernard	7
(Alberta) Cheryl Bernard	8
(Alberta) Crystal Webster	5
3	(Alberta) Crystal Webster	7
2	(Alberta) Shannon Kleibrink	3

==== C Event ====
Quarterfinals		Semifinals		Qualifier 6
(Saskatchewan) Amber Holland	7
(Alberta) Cathy King	5	(Saskatchewan) Amber Holland	4
		(Alberta) Shannon Kleibrink	7
				(Alberta) Shannon Kleibrink	11
				(Alberta) Heather Nedohin	4

Quarterfinals		Semifinals		Qualifier 7
(Manitoba) Chelsea Carey	5
(Manitoba) Kerri Flett	7	(Manitoba) Kerri Flett	8
		(Ontario) Julie Hastings	2
				(Manitoba) Kerri Flett	4
				(Manitoba) Jennifer Jones	8

Semifinals		Qualifier 8
(Ontario) Jacqueline Harrison	9
(Ontario) Jo-Ann Rizzo	3	(Ontario) Jacqueline Harrison	2
		(Alberta) Crystal Webster	5

==== Playoffs ====
Quarterfinals
6	(British Columbia) Kelly Scott	4
14	(Alberta) Crystal Webster	6
7	(Saskatchewan) Stefanie Lawton	7
44	(Alberta) Val Sweeting	0
21	(Quebec) Ève Bélisle	6
3	(Alberta) Shannon Kleibrink	1
2	(Alberta) Cheryl Bernard	6
1	(Manitoba) Jennifer Jones	3

Semifinals
14	(Alberta) Crystal Webster	6
7	(Saskatchewan) Stefanie Lawton	5
21	(Quebec) Ève Bélisle	5
2	(Alberta) Cheryl Bernard	6

Finals
14	(Alberta) Crystal Webster	4
2	(Alberta) Cheryl Bernard	6
