= 2010 Bern Open =

- Host city: Bern, Switzerland
- Arena: Bern Curling Club
- Dates: October 22-24, 2010
- Winner: Thomas Lips
- Curling club: Switzerland
- Skip: Thomas Lips
- Third: Toni Müller
- Second: Remo Schmid
- Lead: Simon Strübin
- Finalist: Hammy McMillan

The 2010 Bern Open is a curling tournament that will be held at the Bern Curling Club in Bern, Switzerland from October 22-24, as a part of the World Curling Tour. 32 teams will be playing in a triple-knockout format to qualify for 8 quarterfinal spots.

== Teams ==
Skip	Third	Second	Lead	Locale
Alexander Attinger	Felix Attinger	Florian Zurrer	Florian Meister	Switzerland
Per Carlsén	Nils Carlsén	Eric Carlsén	Mikael Norberg	Sweden
Giorgio Da Rin	Alessandro Zisa	Alberto Alvera	Marco Mariani	Italy
Benoit Schwarz (fourth)	Peter de Cruz (skip)	Roger Goulka	Valentin Tanner	Switzerland
Thomas Due	Øystein Sørum	Magnus Nedregotten	Sander Rølvaag	Oslo, Norway
Thomas Dufour	Tony Angiboust	Lionel Roux	Wilfrid Coulot	Chamonix, France
Duncan Fernie	David Edwards	Richard Woods	Colin Campbell	Perth, Scotland
Mario Freiberger	Bernhard Lips	Christian Oker	Peter Maurer	Urdorf, Switzerland
Kevin Froidevaux	Didier Rappo	Kim-Lloyd Sciboz	Valentin Loup	Switzerland
Marcus Hasselborg	Peder Folke	Goran Carlsson	Anton Sandstrom	Sweden
Pascal Hess	Yves Hess	Stefan Meienberg	Stefan Schori	Switzerland
Andy Kapp	Andy Lang	Holger Hoehne	Andreas Kempf	Füssen, Germany
Toni Müller	Thomas Lips	Remo Schmid	Simon Strübin	Baden-Regio, Switzerland
Thomas Løvold	Steffen Walstad	Markus Snøve Høiberg	Frode Tobias Bjerke	Oslo, Norway
Hammy McMillan	Hamilton McMillan	Ross Paterson	Sandy Gilmore	Stranraer, Scotland
Sven Michel	Sandro Trolliet	Simon Gempeler	Mathias Graf	Adelboden, Switzerland
David Murdoch	Warwick Smith	Glen Muirhead	Ross Hepburn	Lockerbie. Scotland
Daniel Neuner	Florian Zahler	Dominik Greindl	Laynes Lauterbach	Germany
Claudio Pescia	Sven Iten	Reto Seiler	Rainer Kobler	St. Gallen, Switzerland
Tomi Rantamaki	Kimmo Ilvonen	Jussi Uusipaavalniemi	Jermu Pollanen	Finland
Joël Retornaz	Silvio Zanotelli	Davide Zanotelli	Mirco Ferretti	Italy
Gabor Riesz	Lajos Belleli	Krisztian Hall	Gabor Molnar	Hungary
Manuel Ruch	Claudio Paetz	Daniel Graf	Andreas Klauenbosch	Switzerland
Christof Schwaller	Robert Hurlimann	Urs Eichhorn	Marco Ramstein	Switzerland
David Sik	Marek David	Erik Sik	Pavel Mensik	Czech Republic
Jiří Snítil	Martin Snítil	Jindřich Kitzberger	Marek Vydra	Prague, Czech Republic
Alexey Tselousov	Artur Rajabov	Aleksey Kamnev	Petr Dron	Moscow, Russia
Thomas Ulsrud	Torger Nergård	Christoffer Svae	Håvard Vad Petersson	Oslo, Norway
Jakub Bares (fourth)	Michal Vojtus (skip)	Martin Hejhal	Martin Stepanek	Czech Republic
Markku Uusipaavalniemi	Kasper Hakunti	Joni Ikonen	Toni Anttila	Helsinki, Finland
Patrick Vuille	Gilles Vuille	Martin Rios	Jürg Bamert	Switzerland
Bernhard Werthemann	Roger Stucki	Daniel Widmer	Bastian Brun	Switzerland

== Knockout results ==
=== A Event ===
First Knockout
(Norway) Ulsrud	7
(Switzerland) Frodiveaux	3
(Finland) Uusipaavalniemi	4
(Switzerland) Michel	5
(France) Dufour	5
(Russia) Tselousov	3
(Norway) Due	5
(Switzerland) Ruch	3
(Czech Republic) Vojtus	3
(Switzerland) Werthemann	5
(Sweden) Hasselborg	1
(Switzerland) Hess	8
(Sweden) Carlsén	5
(Germany) Neuner	3
(Italy) Retornaz	4
(Switzerland) Schwaller	7

Quarterfinals
(Norway) Ulsrud	8
(Switzerland) Michel	2
(France) Dufour	6
(Norway) Due	4
(Switzerland) Werthemann	4
(Switzerland) Hess	8
(Sweden) Carlsén	7
(Switzerland) Schwaller	4

Semifinals
(Norway) Ulsrud	6
(France) Dufour	3
(Switzerland) Hess	2
(Sweden) Carlsén	5

Qualifier 1
(Norway) Ulsrud	6
(Sweden) Carlsén	3

First Knockout
(Finland) Rantamaki	1
(Switzerland) Lips	8
(Norway) Løvold	2
(Czech Republic) Sik	7
(Czech Republic) Snitil	6
(Switzerland) Attinger	3
(Germany) Kapp	2
(Switzerland) de Cruz	10
(Scotland) McMillian	4
(Hungary) Riesz	3
(Italy) Da Rin	1
(Switzerland) Vuille	11
(Scotland) Fernie	7
(Switzerland) Pescia	6
(Scotland) Murdoch	3
(Switzerland) Freiberger	1

Quarterfinals
(Switzerland) Lips	4
(Czech Republic) Sik	3
(Czech Republic) Snitil	5
(Switzerland) de Cruz	3
(Scotland) McMillian	4
(Switzerland) Vuille	3
(Scotland) Fernie	8
(Scotland) Murdoch	4

Semifinals
(Switzerland) Lips	6
(Czech Republic) Snitil	2
(Scotland) McMillian	3
(Scotland) Fernie	5

Qualifier 2
(Switzerland) Lips	5
(Scotland) Fernie	4

=== B Event ===
Second Knockout
(Switzerland) Frovideaux	3
(Finland) Uusipaavalniemi	5
(Switzerland) Ruch	3
(Russia) Tselousov	6

Quarterfinals
(Switzerland) Werthemann	1
(Finland) Uusipaavalniemi	7
(Russia) Tselousov	6
(Switzerland) Schwaller	7

Semifinals
(Finland) Uusipaavalniemi	7
(Czech Republic) Snitil	4
(Switzerland) Schwaller	7
(Scotland) McMillan	2

Finals
(Finland) Uusipavaalniemi	1
(Switzerland) Schwaller	4

Second Knockout
(Czech Republic) Vojtus	3
(Sweden) Hasselborg	8
(Germany) Neuner	5
(Italy) Retornaz	8

Quarterfinals
(Sweden) Hasselborg	6
(Switzerland) Michel	8
(Italy) Retornaz	7
(Norway) Due	3

Semifinals
(Switzerland) Michel	5
(Italy) Retornaz	6

Finals
(Italy) Retornaz	6
(Sweden) Carlsén	7
Qualifier 3
(Switzerland) Schwaller	3
(Sweden) Carlsén	5

Second Knockout
(Finland) Rantamaki	6
(Norway) Løvold	1
(Switzerland) Attinger	4
(Germany) Kapp	6

Quarterfinals
(Switzerland) Vuille	1
(Finland) Rantamaki	8
(Germany) Kapp	5
(Scotland) Murdoch	6

Semifinals
(Finland) Rantamaki	3
(Switzerland) Hess	7
(Scotland) Murdoch	6
(France) Dufour	1

Finals
(Switzerland) Hess	2
(Scotland) Murdoch	6

Second Knockout
(Hungary) Riesz	5
(Italy) Da Rin	6
(Switzerland) Pescia	8
(Switzerland) Freiberger	4

Quarterfinals
(Czech Republic) Sik	2
(Italy) Da Rin	7
(Switzerland) Pescia	5
(Switzerland) de Cruz	3

Semifinals
(Czech Republic) Da Rin	2
(Switzerland) Pescia	8

Finals
(Switzerland) Pescia	5
(Scotland) Fernie	6
Qualifier 4
(Scotland) Murdoch	4
(Scotland) Fernie	6

=== C Event ===
Third Knockout
(Switzerland) Froidevaux	3
(Switzerland) Ruch	8
(Switzerland) Vuille	8
(Germany) Kapp	3

Quarterfinals
(Finland) Rantamaki	2
(Switzerland) Ruch	5
(Italy) Da Rin	3
(Switzerland) Vuille	5

Semifinals
(Switzerland) Ruch	3
(Switzerland) Vuille	5

Qualifier 5
(Switzerland) Vuille	4
(Switzerland) Schwaller	9

Third Knockout
(Czech Republic) Vojtus	4
(Germany) Neuner	2

Quarterfinals
(Czech Republic) Sik	3
(Switzerland) de Cruz	7
(France) Dufour	7
(Czech Republic) Vojtus	6

Semifinals
(Switzerland) de Cruz	6
(Italy) Retornaz	4
(France) Dufour	3
(Finland) Uusipaavalniemi	8

Qualifier 6
(Switzerland) de Cruz	7
(Finland) Uusipaavalniemi	5

Third Knockout
(Norway) Løvold	5
(Switzerland) Attinger	4

Quarterfinals
(Scotland) McMillan	4
(Norway) Løvold	2
(Sweden) Hasselborg	4
(Norway) Due	3

Semifinals
(Scotland) McMillan	7
(Switzerland) Pescia	2
(Sweden) Hasselborg	8
(Switzerland) Hess	6

Qualifier 7
(Scotland) McMillan	4
(Sweden) Hasselborg	2

Third Knockout
(Switzerland) Werthemann	3
(Russia) Tselousov	4
(Hungary) Riesz	6
(Switzerland) Freiberger	4

Quarterfinals
(Switzerland) Michel	4
(Russia) Tselousov	6
(Czech Republic) Snitil	8
(Hungary) Riesz	2

Semifinals
(Russia) Tselousov	6
(Czech Republic) Snitil	0

Qualifier 8
(Russia) Tselousov	4
(Scotland) Murdoch	5

== Playoffs ==
Quarterfinals
(Norway) Ulsrud	3
(Scotland) Murdoch	6
(Scotland) McMillan	7
(Sweden) Carlsén	1
(Scotland) Fernie	5
(Switzerland) Schwaller	4
(Switzerland) de Cruz	1
(Switzerland) Lips	3

Semifinals
(Scotland) Murdoch	3
(Scotland) McMillan	5
(Scotland) Fernie	2
(Switzerland) Lips	3

Finals
(Scotland) McMillan	5
(Switzerland) Lips	6
