= Ève Bélisle =

Canadian curler

- Curler
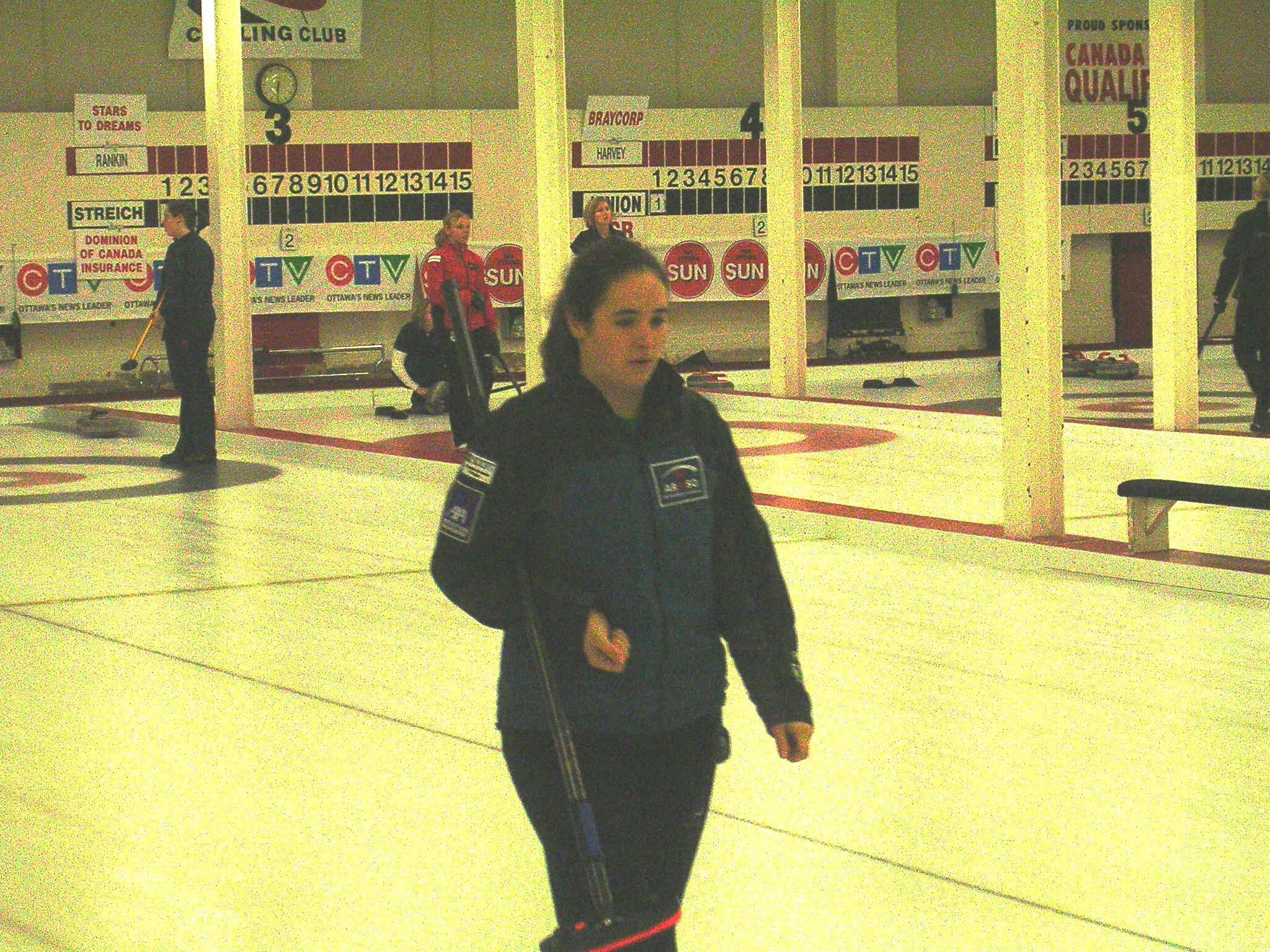
- Born: September 14, 1979 (age 47); Montreal, Quebec, Canada

Team
- Curling club: TMR CC, Mount Royal, QC

Curling career
- Member Association: Quebec
- Hearts: 3 (2006, 2010, 2017)
- Top CTRS ranking: 11th (2009–10)

Ève Bélisle (born September 14, 1979) is a Canadian curler from Montreal. She is a three-time Quebec Scotties Tournament of Hearts champion and two-time Quebec Mixed champion.

== Career ==
Bélisle became one of the very few women to ever skip a team to the Canadian Mixed Curling Championship in 2004. Her Quebec team finished the round robin of the 2005 Canadian Mixed Curling Championship with a 4–7 record. The following year, Bélisle won her first women's provincial championships giving her the right to represent Team Quebec at the 2006 Scott Tournament of Hearts. At the Hearts, Bélisle finished the round robin with a 7–4 record putting her in the tiebreaker against Newfoundland and Labrador's Heather Strong. Quebec won the tiebreaker but lost the 3 vs. 4 page playoff game against the defending champion Jennifer Jones. At the 2007 Canadian Mixed Curling Championship (played in November, 2006), Bélisle became only the second woman to skip a team to the final (Shannon Kleibrink was the first). She lost to New Brunswick in the final, skipped by Terry Odishaw.

Bélisle played in her first two Grand Slam of Curling events during the 2007–08 season. She missed the playoffs at the 2007 Sobeys Slam before reaching the semifinals of the 2008 Players' Championship. The following season, she played in three slams but failed to qualify in all of them.

The 2009–10 season was Bélisle's most successful season to date. She once again played in three slams, making the quarterfinals at the 2009 Trail Appliances Curling Classic and the semifinals at the 2010 Players' Championship once again. Bélisle also won her second provincial title in 2010, and proceeded to finish with a 5–6 record at the 2010 Scotties Tournament of Hearts.

In 2013, Bélisle won the mixed doubles event with teammate Steve Johns at the New Zealand Winter Games, representing Australia.

After taking a few seasons off, Bélisle returned to competitive curling for the 2016–17 season. She won her third provincial title at the 2017 Quebec Scotties Tournament of Hearts, defeating Marie-France Larouche in the final. She finished with a record of 7–4 at the 2017 Scotties Tournament of Hearts, falling just short of playoffs.

== Personal life ==
Bélisle is employed at the Centre for Research in Computational Thermochemistry at École Polytechnique. In spring of 2008, she noticed and spread the news of a peregrine falcon pair's presence at the Pavillon Roger-Gaudry of the university, eventually leading to the installation of a nest box.

== Grand Slam record ==
Key
C	Champion
F	Lost in Final
SF	Lost in Semifinal
QF	Lost in Quarterfinals
R16	Lost in the round of 16
Q	Did not advance to playoffs
T2	Played in Tier 2 event
DNP	Did not participate in event
N/A	Not a Grand Slam event that season

Event	2007–08	2008–09	2009–10
Players'	SF	DNP	SF

=== Former events ===
Event	2007–08	2008–09	2009–10
Autumn Gold	DNP	Q	QF
Manitoba Lotteries	DNP	Q	Q
Sobeys Slam	Q	Q	N/A
