= Cheryl Bernard =

Canadian curler and Olympic medalist

- Curler
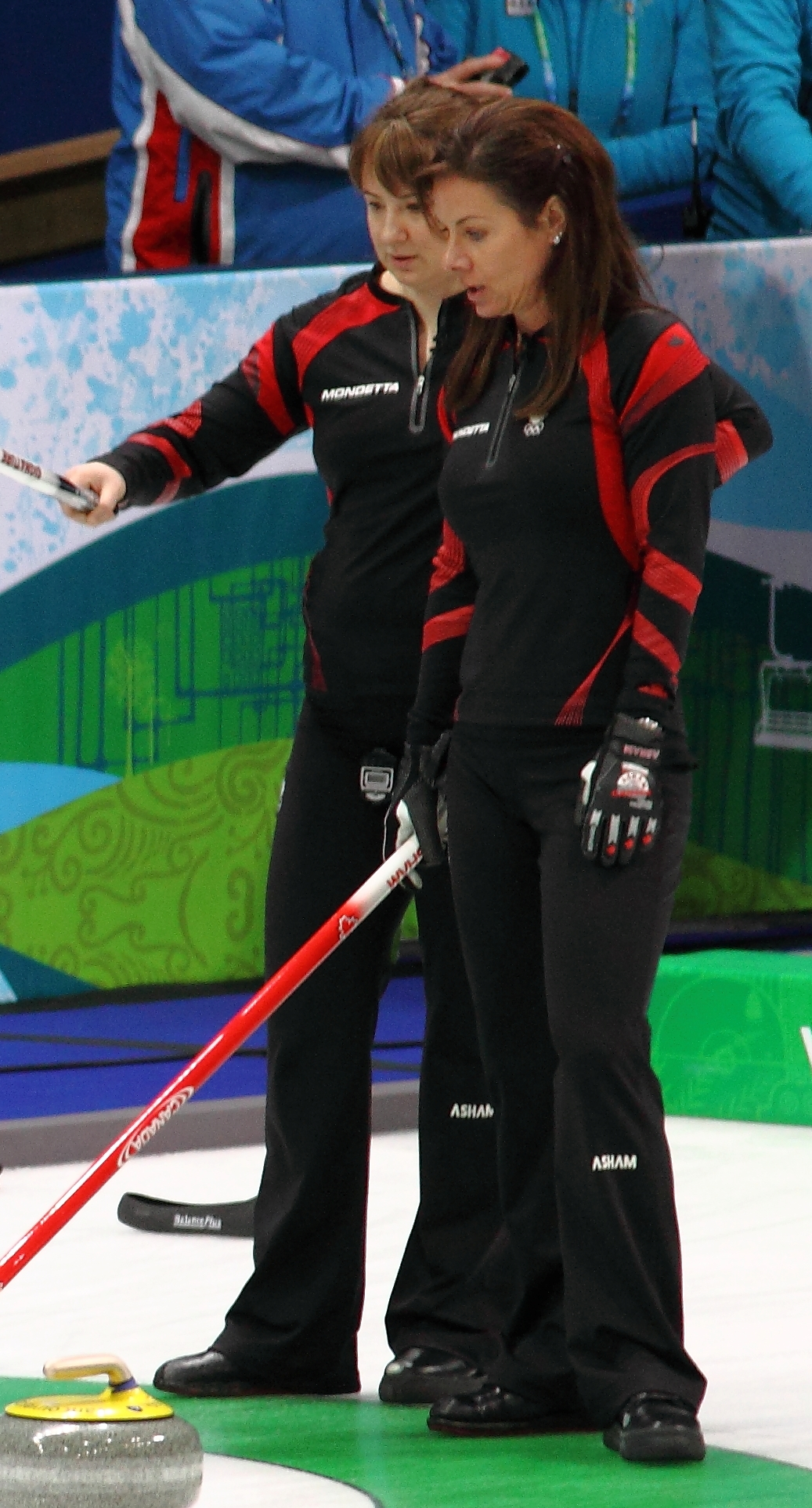
- Susan O'Connor and Bernard (right) at the Winter Olympics in 2010
- Other names: Cheryl Kullman
- Born: Cheryl Bernard; June 30, 1966 (age 60); Grande Prairie, Alberta, Canada

Team
- Skip: Cheryl Bernard
- Third: Carolyn McRorie
- Second: Laine Peters
- Lead: Karen Ruus

Curling career
- Member Association: Alberta
- Hearts: 4 (1992, 1996, 2007, 2009)
- Olympic: 2 (2010, 2018)
- Top CTRS ranking: 2nd (2009–10)
- Grand Slam victories: 1 (2010 Players')
Medal record
Women's curling
Representing Canada
Winter Olympics
Silver medal – second place	2010 Vancouver
Representing Alberta
Scotties Tournament of Hearts
Silver medal – second place	1996 Thunder Bay
Canadian Olympic Curling Trials
Gold medal – first place	2009 Edmonton

Cheryl Bernard (born June 30, 1966) is a Canadian curler from Calgary, Alberta. She represented Team Canada at the 2010 Winter Olympics as the team's skip, winning the silver medal in women's curling after falling to Sweden in the final. Her first major tournament win came at the 2009 Canadian Olympic Curling Trials in Edmonton, Alberta. She also represented Canada again at the 2018 Winter Olympics in PyeongChang as the alternate for Rachel Homan's team.

== Career ==
=== Early career ===
Bernard was born in Grande Prairie, Alberta. She began curling at the age of eight. In 1988, she lost in the Alberta provincial finals playing second for Jill Ferguson; however, four years later she would win the provincial title as a skip, earning a berth at the 1992 Scott Tournament of Hearts, Canada's national curling championship with her team of Allison Earl, Barb Davies and Bev Kellerman. The following year, Bernard won the provincial mixed title with spouse Terry Meek.

In 1995, Bernard lost the Alberta provincial final, but rebounded the following year to win it, sending her to the '96 Hearts, this time with an altered lineup. Her team of Karen Ruus, Barb Sherrington and Judy Pendergast had a 7–4 round robin record. In the playoffs, Bernard's rink won their first game in the 1 vs. 2 page playoff match-up against Ontario (skipped by Marilyn Bodogh). This sent her Alberta team to the final, where they faced Bodogh in a rematch, which they lost, 7–4.

=== 1997 to 2006 ===
Bernard started up her own insurance brokerage at the age of 23 and in the process, she failed to make it to another national championship for 11 years. In the meantime, she was a finalist at the JVC/TSN Skins Game in 1999, and made it to the provincial finals once again in 2000. She was also the Canadian Women's Curling Tour champion in 2004. In 2006, she lost in the first ever women's Players' Championships final against Jennifer Jones.

=== 2007 to 2011 ===
Bernard won her third provincial championship in 2007, defeating the two-time defending champion Cathy King rink in the Alberta final, 7–4. At the 2007 Scotties Tournament of Hearts, her team of Susan O'Connor, Carolyn Darbyshire and Cori Bartel finished with a 6–5 record, tying them with Prince Edward Island and Ontario. Bernard's team beat Ontario in the first tie breaker, but were unable to beat P.E.I.'s Suzanne Gaudet (Birt) whom they lost to 5–4. In 2008, Bernard's team played in their first Grand Slam of Curling final, losing the 2008 Trail Appliances Curling Classic to Shannon Kleibrink's rink. In 2009, Bernard won her fourth Alberta title and represented the province at the 2009 Scotties Tournament of Hearts where her team finished with another 6–5 record. However, this would keep them out of the playoffs.

The Bernard team's success during this period qualified them for the 2009 Canadian Olympic Curling Trials. They were one of four teams to directly earn a spot at the event nicknamed "The Roar of the Rings". At "the Roar", Bernard's rink almost went undefeated, having lost only their final round robin game to Stefanie Lawton. Their 6–1 record earned them a direct spot in the final, which they won. They defeated Shannon Kleibrink in the final by a score of 7–6. The game came down to the final shot, where Bernard had to draw to the full eight-foot to win.

Bernard's team won the silver medal at the 2010 Olympic Winter Games in Vancouver, British Columbia. After completing the round robin in first place with just one loss to China, Bernard won the silver medal, losing to Sweden (skipped by Anette Norberg) in an extra end, 7–6.

Bernard wrapped up the 2009–10 curling season by winning the 2010 Players' Championships, her first Grand Slam victory in her career and was named 2010 MVP by her peers during that event.

Despite going to the 2010 Winter Olympics, The Bernard rink began the 2010–11 curling season without a corporate sponsor. The response of the team was to put up billboards around Calgary advertising their need for one. Within a month Dairy Queen announced they would be their main corporate sponsor. In December 2010, the team lost to Stefanie Lawton's rink 7–3 in the 2010 Canada Cup of Curling.

Following losing the semi-final of the 2011 Alberta Scotties Tournament of Hearts, on February 8, 2011, Team Bernard announced that they would disband the team. This had been a team agreement at the beginning of 2011.

=== 2011–2014 ===
Cheryl Bernard announced her new curling team for the 2011–12 season will consist of longtime third Susan O'Connor, Lori Olson-Johns who previously played with Crystal Webster, and Cathy King, and three time junior champion Jennifer Sadleir. Due to the Sports Canada Funding the Bernard team received from their olympic appearance, all four members had to play the 2011–2012, which left Cori Morris and Carolyn McRorie having to join, or form a new team. McRorie was the alternate for the Bernard team when appropriate.

Although Bernard did not participate at the 2012 Scotties Tournament of Hearts, she was awarded the Joan Mead Builder's Award. The award is given to someone in the curling community that significantly contributes to the growth and development of women's curling in Canada. Her rink failed to qualify for the playoffs at the 2012 Alberta Scotties Tournament of Hearts.

In 2012, Sadlier was replaced by Shannon Aleksic at lead. Bernard's rink would not even return to the provincials in 2013, as her rink lost to Lisa Eyamie in the C Final of the Alberta Southern qualifier.

In her last season before retirement, Bernard won the 2013 Good Times Bonspiel and qualified for the 2014 Alberta Scotties Tournament of Hearts. There, the team had a successful run, making it to the final before losing to Valerie Sweeting.

=== Retirement ===
Bernard announced her retirement from competitive curling in June 2014.

After retiring from competitive curling Bernard has dedicated her time to give back to the communities that supported her through her Olympic journey. In October 2014, Goodwill Industries of Alberta announced Bernard would become an ambassador and "Goodwillian". Bernard decided to join Goodwill after touring their operations in Calgary. She learned about Goodwill's Power of Work program, which provides individuals with disabilities the opportunity to enhance their lives through meaningful employment.[9].

In November 2014, Bernard was invited by TSN to be a guest analyst at the 2014 Canada Cup of Curling. Bernard remained with the TSN team for the rest of the 2014–15 Season of Champions and has remained a TSN curling commentator until retiring in 2022.

=== Post-retirement ===
Bernard briefly came back from retirement in 2016 to play in two events, making it to the finals of the Prestige Hotels & Resorts Curling Classic (with O'Connor, Darbyshire and lead Lawnie MacDonald) and sparing for Jennifer Jones at the Colonial Square Ladies Classic. In 2018, she was named as the alternate player for the Canadian women's team (skipped by Rachel Homan) at the 2018 Winter Olympics. At 51, she was the oldest athlete at the 2018 Winter Olympics. She spared in two events for Team Casey Scheidegger with Scheidegger on maternity leave during the 2019–20 season. They were runners-up at the 2019 Curlers Corner Autumn Gold Curling Classic and finished with a 2–4 record at the Canada Cup.

Bernard, with teammates Carolyn Darbyshire-McRorie, Laine Peters and Karen Ruus won the 2020 Alberta women's senior championship. While the 2020 Canadian Senior Curling Championships were cancelled due to the COVID-19 pandemic, their win qualified them to represent Alberta at the 2021 Canadian Senior Curling Championships.

== Personal life ==
Aside from curling, Bernard also co-wrote Between the Sheets: Creating Curling Champions in 2005, a book about the mental aspects of curling, with journalist Guy Scholz. After taking home a silver medal in her home country at the 2010 Winter Olympics in Vancouver, British Columbia, Cheryl teamed up with Scholz once again to co-publish an updated version of the book titled Between the Sheets: The Silver Lining through Canadian book publisher Polished Publishing Group (PPG), copyright 2011.

Bernard lives with her common-law husband, curler Terry Meek in Calgary, Alberta. She currently works as the President and Chief executive officer of Canada's Sports Hall of Fame.

Bernard does motivational keynotes for corporations, sharing the parallels between business and sport, as well as stories and lessons from the Olympics.

== Grand Slam record ==
Key
C	Champion
F	Lost in Final
SF	Lost in Semifinal
QF	Lost in Quarterfinals
R16	Lost in the round of 16
Q	Did not advance to playoffs
T2	Played in Tier 2 event
DNP	Did not participate in event
N/A	Not a Grand Slam event that season

Event	2005–06	2006–07	2007–08	2008–09	2009–10	2010–11	2011–12	2012–13	2013–14
Players'	F	SF	SF	SF	C	QF	DNP	DNP	DNP

=== Former events ===
Event	2006–07	2007–08	2008–09	2009–10	2010–11	2011–12	2012–13	2013–14
Autumn Gold	SF	Q	F	QF	QF	QF	QF	Q
Manitoba Lotteries	Q	SF	QF	QF	Q	SF	SF	DNP
Colonial Square	N/A	N/A	N/A	N/A	N/A	N/A	Q	DNP
Wayden Transportation	QF	Q	SF	N/A	N/A	N/A	N/A	N/A
Sobeys Slam	N/A	Q	Q	N/A	DNP	N/A	N/A	N/A

== Teams ==
Season	Skip	Third	Second	Lead	Events
1987–88	Jill Ferguson	Judy Pendergast	Cheryl Bernard	Sue Fulkerth	
1989–90	Cheryl Bernard	Shari Demmon	Allison Rizos	Bonnie Pugsley	
1990–91	Cheryl Bernard	Allison Rizos	Bev Kellerman	Sue Fulkerth	
1991–92	Cheryl Bernard	Allison Earl	Barb Davies	Bev Kellerman	1992 STOH
1995–96	Cheryl Kullman	Karen Ruus	Barb Davies	Judy Pendergast	1996 STOH
1996-97	Cheryl Kullman	Karen Ruus	Barb Davies	Judy Pendergast	
1997-98	Cheryl Kullman	Karen Ruus	Barb Davies	Judy Pendergast	
1998-99	Cheryl Bernard	Karen Ruus	Barb Davies	Crystal Rumberg	
1999-00	Cheryl Bernard	Karen Ruus	Barb Davies	Crystal Rumberg	
2001-02	Cheryl Bernard	Susan O'Connor	Barb Davies	Karen Ruus	
2002-03	Cheryl Bernard	Susan O'Connor	Joanne Sipka	Karen Ruus	
2003-04	Cheryl Bernard	Susan O'Connor	Joanne Sipka	Karen Ruus	
2004–05	Cheryl Bernard	Susan O'Connor	Jody McNabb	Karen Ruus	
2005–06	Cheryl Bernard	Susan O'Connor	Carolyn Darbyshire	Cori Bartel	
2006–07	Cheryl Bernard	Susan O'Connor	Carolyn Darbyshire	Cori Bartel	2007 STOH
2007–08	Cheryl Bernard	Susan O'Connor	Carolyn Darbyshire	Cori Bartel	
2008–09	Cheryl Bernard	Susan O'Connor	Carolyn Darbyshire	Cori Bartel	2009 STOH
2009–10	Cheryl Bernard	Susan O'Connor	Carolyn Darbyshire	Cori Bartel	2009 COCT, 2010 OG
2010–11	Cheryl Bernard	Susan O'Connor	Carolyn Darbyshire	Cori Morris	
2011–12	Cheryl Bernard	Susan O'Connor	Lori Olson-Johns	Jennifer Sadleir	
2012–13	Cheryl Bernard	Susan O'Connor	Lori Olson-Johns	Shannon Aleksic	
2013–14	Cheryl Bernard	Susan O'Connor	Lori Olson-Johns	Shannon Aleksic	
2016	Cheryl Bernard	Susan O'Connor	Carolyn Darbyshire	Lawnie MacDonald	
2019–20	Cheryl Bernard	Carolyn McRorie	Laine Peters	Karen Ruus	
2021–22	Cheryl Bernard	Carolyn McRorie	Laine Peters	Karen Ruus	
