= 2008 Casinos of Winnipeg Classic =

Curling competition

- Host city: Winnipeg, Manitoba
- Arena: Fort Rouge Curling Club
- Dates: October 24-27
- Winner: (Saskatchewan) Team Englot
- Curling club: Tartan CC, Regina, Saskatchewan
- Skip: Michelle Englot
- Third: Deanna Doig
- Second: Roberta Materi
- Lead: Cindy Simmons
- Finalist: (British Columbia) Kelly Scott

The 2008 Casinos of Winnipeg Classic was held October 24–27, 2008. It was the fifth edition of the event, and the last with that name before it changed names to the Manitoba Lotteries Women's Curling Classic.

The total purse of the event was $62,000, $16,000 of which going to the winning Michelle Englot rink of Regina, Saskatchewan. $11,000 went to the runners-up Kelly Scott rink from Kelowna, British Columbia.

The event took place at the Fort Rouge Curling Club in Winnipeg, Manitoba, and it was the third time the event was a Grand Slam event. It was Englot's only Grand Slam victory.

== Teams ==
| Skip | Third | Second | Lead | City |
|---|---|---|---|---|
| Sherry Anderson | Kim Hodson | Heather Walsh | Donna Gignac | Saskatoon, Saskatchewan |
| Ève Bélisle | Brenda Nicholls | Martine Comeau | Julie Rainville | Montreal, Quebec |
| Cheryl Bernard | Susan O'Connor | Carolyn Darbyshire | Cori Bartel | Calgary, Alberta |
| Jan Betker | Sherry Linton | Allison Slupski | Marcia Gudereit | Regina, Saskatchewan |
| Lisa Blixhavn | Jaimie Campbell | Lana Hunter | Tanya Enns | Winnipeg, Manitoba |
| Maureen Bonar | Nancy Smith | Rhonda Ritchie | Dana Allerton | Brandon, Manitoba |
| Chelsea Carey | Kari White | Kristen Foster | Lindsay Titheridge | Winnipeg, Manitoba |
| Michelle Englot | Deanna Doig | Roberta Materi | Cindy Simmons | Regina, Saskatchewan |
| Janet Harvey | Cherie-Ann Loder | Kristin Loder | Carey Kirby | Winnipeg, Manitoba |
| Amber Holland | Kim Schneider | Tammy Schneider | Heather Seeley | Kronau, Saskatchewan |
| Kristy Jenion | Karen Klein | Theresa Cannon | Jillian Sandison | Winnipeg, Manitoba |
| Jennifer Jones | Cathy Overton-Clapham | Jill Officer | Dawn Askin | Winnipeg, Manitoba |
| Cathy King | Lori Olson-Johns | Raylene Rocque | Tracy Bush | Edmonton, Alberta |
| Shannon Kleibrink | Amy Nixon | Bronwen Saunders | Chelsey Bell | Calgary, Alberta |
| Kaitlyn Lawes | Jenna Loder | Laryssa Grenkow | Breanne Meakin | Winnipeg, Manitoba |
| Stefanie Lawton | Marliese Kasner | Sherri Singler | Lana Vey | Saskatoon, Saskatchewan |
| Kim Link | Colleen Kilgallen | Pam Kolton | Renee Fletcher | Winnipeg, Manitoba |
| Chrissy Cadorin | Colleen Madonia (Skip) | Lee Merklinger | Kate Hamer | Mississauga, Ontario |
| Krista McCarville | Tara George | Kari MacLean | Lorraine Lang | Thunder Bay, Ontario |
| Debbie McCormick | Allison Pottinger | Nicole Joraanstad | Natalie Nicholson | Madison, Wisconsin |
| Sherry Middaugh | Kirsten Wall | Kim Moore | Andra Harmark | Coldwater, Ontario |
| Anette Norberg | Eva Lund | Cathrine Lindahl | Anna Svard | Härnösand, Sweden |
| Karen Porritt | Janice Blair | Susan Baleja | Alison Harvey | Winnipeg, Manitoba |
| Julie Reddick | Jo-Ann Rizzo | Leigh Armstrong | Stephanie Leachman | Brantford, Ontario |
| Holly Scott | Tara Scott | Lisa DeRiviere | Jenna Scott | Winnipeg, Manitoba |
| Kelly Scott | Jeanna Schraeder | Sasha Carter | Renee Simons | Kelowna, British Columbia |
| Renee Sonnenberg | Nikki Smith | Twyla Bruce | Cary-Anne Sallows | Grand Prairie, Alberta |
| Barb Spencer | Darcy Robertson | Brette Richards | Barb Enright | Winnipeg, Manitoba |
| Linda Stewart | Jan Sandison | Tammy Schoenrath | Jodi Proctor | Winnipeg, Manitoba |
| Kaileigh Strath | Kristen Williamson | Leslie Wilson | Raunora Westcott | Winnipeg, Manitoba |
| Heather Strong | Cathy Cunningham | Laura Strong | Peg Goss | St. John's, Newfoundland and Labrador |
| Crystal Webster | Desiree Owen | Samantha Preston | Stephanie Malekoff | Calgary, Alberta |

=== A Event ===
First Knockout
(British Columbia) Kelly Scott | 4
(Manitoba) Kaitlyn Lawes | 5
(Saskatchewan) Jan Betker | 7
(Quebec) Ève Bélisle | 5
(Ontario) Krista McCarville | 8
(Manitoba) Lisa Blixhavn | 6
(Manitoba) Kalieigh Strath | 2
(Sweden) Anette Norberg | 5
(Alberta) Shannon Kleibrink | 3
(Manitoba) Kim Link | 4
(Manitoba) Janet Harvey | 4
(Newfoundland and Labrador) Heather Strong | 7
(Saskatchewan) Michelle Englot | 6
(Ontario) Colleen Madonia | 7
(Manitoba) Holly Scott | 4
(Alberta) Cheryl Bernard | 5

Quarterfinals
(Manitoba) Kaitlyn Lawes | 8
(Saskatchewan) Jan Betker | 1
(Ontario) Krista McCarville | 5
(Sweden) Anette Norberg | 6
(Manitoba) Kim Link | 4
(Newfoundland and Labrador) Heather Strong | 3
(Ontario) Colleen Madonia | 3
(Alberta) Cheryl Bernard | 6

Semifinals
(Manitoba) Kaitlyn Lawes | 8
(Sweden) Anette Norberg | 5
(Manitoba) Kim Link | 4
(Alberta) Cheryl Bernard | 5

Qualifier 1
(Manitoba) Kaitlyn Lawes | 2
(Alberta) Cheryl Bernard | 7

First Knockout
(Saskatchewan) Stefanie Lawton | 9
(Manitoba) Maureen Bonar | 3
(Alberta) Crystal Webster | 6
(Wisconsin) Debbie McCormick | 4
(Saskatchewan) Amber Holland | 6
(Manitoba) Karen Porritt | 5
(Manitoba) Chelsea Carey | 7
(Ontario) Sherry Middaugh | 4
(Saskatchewan) Sherry Anderson | 6
(Manitoba) Kristy Jenion | 1
(Manitoba) Barb Spencer | 10
(Alberta) Cathy King | 6
(Alberta) Renee Sonnenberg | 6
(Ontario) Julie Reddick | 3
(Manitoba) Linda Stewart | 4
(Manitoba) Jennifer Jones | 5

Quarterfinals
(Saskatchewan) Stefanie Lawton | 6
(Alberta) Crystal Webster | 2
(Saskatchewan) Amber Holland | 9
(Manitoba) Chelsea Carey | 8
(Saskatchewan) Sherry Anderson | 3
(Manitoba) Barb Spencer | 6
(Alberta) Renee Sonnenberg | 3
(Manitoba) Jennifer Jones | 6

Semifinals
(Saskatchewan) Stefanie Lawton | 7
(Saskatchewan) Amber Holland | 6
(Manitoba) Barb Spencer | 3
(Manitoba) Jennifer Jones | 8

Qualifier 2
(Saskatchewan) Stefanie Lawton | 2
(Manitoba) Jennifer Jones | 6

=== B Event ===
Second Knockout
(British Columbia) Kelly Scott | 6
(Quebec) Ève Bélisle | 4
(Manitoba) Lisa Blixhavn | 7
(Manitoba) Kalieigh Strath | 4
(Alberta) Shannon Kleibrink | 8
(Manitoba) Janet Harvey | 1
(Saskatchewan) Michelle Englot | 5
(Manitoba) Holly Scott | 4

Quarterfinals
(British Columbia) Kelly Scott | 4
(Manitoba) Lisa Blixhavn | 6
(Alberta) Shannon Kleibrink | 0
(Saskatchewan) Michelle Englot | 7

Semifinals
(Manitoba) Lisa Blixhavn | 4
(Saskatchewan) Amber Holland | 3
(Saskatchewan) Michelle Englot | 3
(Manitoba) Barb Spencer | 4

To Qualifier 3
(Manitoba) Lisa Blixhavn | 6
(Manitoba) Barb Spencer | 3

Second Knockout
(Alberta) Crystal Webster | 5
(Manitoba) Chelsea Carey | 4
(Saskatchewan) Sherry Anderson | 8
(Alberta) Renee Sonnenberg | 4

Semifinals
(Alberta) Crystal Webster | 5
(Saskatchewan) Sherry Anderson | 6

To Qualifier 3
(Saskatchewan) Sherry Anderson | 3
(Manitoba) Kaitlyn Lawes | 4
Qualifier 3
(Manitoba) Lisa Blixhavn | 3
(Manitoba) Kaitlyn Lawes | 8

Second Knockout
(Manitoba) Maureen Bonar | 5
(Wisconsin) Debbie McCormick | 2
(Manitoba) Karen Porritt | 3
(Ontario) Sherry Middaugh | 4
(Manitoba) Kristy Jenion | 3
(Alberta) Cathy King | 5
(Ontario) Julie Reddick | 7
(Manitoba) Linda Stewart | 3

Quarterfinals
(Manitoba) Maureen Bonar | 9
(Ontario) Sherry Middaugh | 4
(Alberta) Cathy King | 6
(Ontario) Julie Reddick | 5

Semifinals
(Sweden) Anette Norberg | 10
(Manitoba) Maureen Bonar | 6
(Manitoba) Kim Link | 9
(Alberta) Cathy King | 5

To Qualifier 4
(Sweden) Anette Norberg | 5
(Manitoba) Kim Link | 3

Second Knockout
(Saskatchewan) Jan Betker | 6
(Ontario) Krista McCarville | 4
(Newfoundland and Labrador) Heather Strong | 5
(Ontario) Colleen Madonia | 7

Semifinals
(Saskatchewan) Jan Betker | 6
(Ontario) Colleen Madonia | 5

To Qualifier 4
(Saskatchewan) Jan Betker | 5
(Saskatchewan) Stefanie Lawton | 7
Qualifier 4
(Saskatchewan) Stefanie Lawton | 5
(Sweden) Anette Norberg | 6

=== C Event ===
Third Knockout
(Quebec) Ève Bélisle | 8
(Manitoba) Kaileigh Strath | 6

Quarterfinals
(Ontario) Colleen Madonia | 0
(Quebec) Ève Bélisle | 8
(Manitoba) Maureen Bonar | 4
(Alberta) Cathy King | 7

Semifinals
(Quebec) Ève Bélisle | 4
(Alberta) Cathy King | 9

Qualifier 5
(Alberta) Cathy King | 6
(Manitoba) Lisa Blixhavn | 4

Third Knockout
(Manitoba) Janet Harvey | 4
(Manitoba) Holly Scott | 9
(British Columbia) Kelly Scott | 7
(Alberta) Shannon Kleibrink | 6

Quarterfinals
(Manitoba) Holly Scott | 5
(Manitoba) Chelsea Carey | 3
(Alberta) Renee Sonnenberg | 6
(British Columbia) Kelly Scott | 7

Semifinals
(Manitoba) Holly Scott | 6
(Saskatchewan) Jan Betker | 4
(British Columbia) Kelly Scott | 6
(Manitoba) Kim Link | 2

Qualifier 6
(Manitoba) Holly Scott | 4
(British Columbia) Kelly Scott | 6

Third Knockout
(Ontario) Sherry Middaugh | 3
(Ontario) Julie Reddick | 5
(Wisconsin) Debbie McCormick | 10
(Manitoba) Karen Porritt | 3

Quarterfinals
(Ontario) Krista McCarville | 5
(Ontario) Julie Reddick | 4
(Newfoundland and Labrador) Heather Strong | 5
(Wisconsin) Debbie McCormick | 4

Semifinals
(Ontario) Krista McCarville | 2
(Manitoba) Barb Spencer | 7
(Newfoundland and Labrador) Heather Strong | 7
(Saskatchewan) Sherry Anderson | 1

Qualifier 7
(Manitoba) Barb Spencer | 6
(Newfoundland and Labrador) Heather Strong | 4

Third Knockout
(Manitoba) Kristy Jenion | 5
(Manitoba) Linda Stewart | 3

Quarterfinals
(Saskatchewan) Amber Holland | 3
(Saskatchewan) Michelle Englot | 9
(Alberta) Crystal Webster | 3
(Manitoba) Kristy Jenion | 9

Semifinals
(Saskatchewan) Michelle Englot | 7
(Manitoba) Kristy Jenion | 4

Qualifier 8
(Saskatchewan) Michelle Englot | 7
(Saskatchewan) Stefanie Lawton | 6

== Playoffs ==
Quarterfinals
(Alberta) Cheryl Bernard | 5
(British Columbia) Kelly Scott | 6
(Manitoba) Barb Spencer | 2
(Manitoba) Kaitlyn Lawes | 6
(Manitoba) Jennifer Jones | 3
(Alberta) Cathy King | 7
(Saskatchewan) Michelle Englot | 8
(Sweden) Anette Norberg | 4

Semifinals
(British Columbia) Kelly Scott | 6
(Manitoba) Kaitlyn Lawes | 5
(Alberta) Cathy King | 5
(Saskatchewan) Michelle Englot | 7

Finals
(British Columbia) Kelly Scott | 0
(Saskatchewan) Michelle Englot | 6
