= 2009 Players' Championship =

Grand Slam of Curling event

2009 Grey Power Players' Championship
- Host city: Grande Prairie, Alberta
- Arena: Crystal Centre
- Dates: April 14–19
- Men's winner: Randy Ferbey
- Curling club: Saville Sports Centre, Edmonton
- Skip: Randy Ferbey
- Third: David Nedohin (fourth)
- Second: Scott Pfeifer
- Lead: Marcel Rocque
- Finalist: Glenn Howard
- Women's winner: Jennifer Jones
- Curling club: St. Vital Curling Club, Winnipeg
- Skip: Jennifer Jones
- Third: Cathy Overton-Clapham
- Second: Jill Officer
- Lead: Dawn Askin
- Finalist: Shannon Kleibrink

The 2009 Grey Power Players' Championship was the last Grand Slam event of both the World Curling Tour and Women's World Curling Tour for the 2008–09 season. This was the seventeenth time the event has taken place, and the fourth time since it was switched to joint men's/women's format. The event was held in Grande Prairie, Alberta April 14–19. Since the event was a part of the Olympic qualifying process in Canada, only Canadian teams were invited. The total purse for each event is $100,000.

Edmonton's Randy Ferbey won the men's event securing a spot for his rink at the 2009 Canadian Olympic Curling Trials. On the women's side, Winnipeg's Jennifer Jones rink won their third Players' title.

== Men's event ==
=== Teams ===
Skip	WCT $ #	CTRS
(Alberta) Ted Appelman	13	14
(Manitoba) Kerry Burtnyk	9	7
(Alberta) Randy Ferbey	5	6
(British Columbia) Sean Geall	16	12
(Newfoundland and Labrador) Brad Gushue	4	4
(Saskatchewan) Brad Heidt	18	18
(Ontario) Glenn Howard	1	2
(Saskatchewan) Joel Jordison	11	10
(Alberta) Kevin Koe	7	9
(Alberta) Kevin Martin	2	1
(Ontario) Dale Matchett	69	16
(Manitoba) Mike McEwen	8	8
(Ontario) Wayne Middaugh	3	3
(Alberta) Chris Schille	10	13
(Saskatchewan) Pat Simmons	46	19
(Manitoba) Jeff Stoughton	6	5

=== Results ===
==== A event ====
Quarterfinals
(Alberta) Kevin Martin	9
(Saskatchewan) Pat Simmons	3
(Alberta) Kevin Koe	6
(Manitoba) Mike McEwen	5
(Newfoundland and Labrador) Brad Gushue	6
(Alberta) Ted Appelman	2
(Alberta) Randy Ferbey	6
(Alberta) Chris Schille	5

Semifinals
(Alberta) Kevin Martin	6
(Alberta) Kevin Koe	5
(Newfoundland and Labrador) Brad Gushue	3
(Alberta) Randy Ferbey	6

Qualifier 1
(Alberta) Kevin Martin	5
(Alberta) Randy Ferbey	6

Quarterfinals
(Manitoba) Jeff Stoughton	7
(Ontario) Dale Matchett	1
(Ontario) Wayne Middaugh	7
(British Columbia) Sean Geall	3
(Manitoba) Kerry Burtnyk	4
(Saskatchewan) Joel Jordison	5
(Ontario) Glenn Howard	7
(Saskatchewan) Brad Heidt	4

Semifinals
(Manitoba) Jeff Stoughton	2
(Ontario) Wayne Middaugh	6
(Saskatchewan) Joel Jordison	2
(Ontario) Glenn Howard	7

Qualifier 2
(Ontario) Wayne Middaugh	3
(Ontario) Glenn Howard	7

==== B event ====
Quarterfinals		Semifinals		Qualifier 3
(Saskatchewan) Pat Simmons	5
(Manitoba) Mike McEwen	7	(Manitoba) Mike McEwen	7
(Alberta) Ted Appelman	6	(Alberta) Ted Appelman	5
(Alberta) Chris Schille	3			(Manitoba) Mike McEwen	8
				(Ontario) Wayne Middaugh	2

Quarterfinals		Semifinals		Qualifier 4
(Ontario) Dale Matchett	4
(British Columbia) Sean Geall	3	(Ontario) Dale Matchett	9
(Manitoba) Kerry Burtnyk	5	(Saskatchewan) Brad Heidt	4
(Saskatchewan) Brad Heidt	7			(Ontario) Dale Matchett	1
				(Alberta) Kevin Martin	8

Semifinals
1	(Alberta) Kevin Koe	6
4	(Newfoundland and Labrador) Brad Gushue	8
3	(Manitoba) Jeff Stoughton	2
2	(Saskatchewan) Joel Jordison	7

Qualifier 5
(Newfoundland and Labrador) Brad Gushue	5
(Saskatchewan) Joel Jordison	4

==== C event ====
Quarterfinals		Semifinals		Qualifier 6
(Saskatchewan) Pat Simmons	7
(Alberta) Chris Schille	3	(Saskatchewan) Pat Simmons	5
		(Manitoba) Jeff Stoughton	7
				(Manitoba) Jeff Stoughton	6
				(Ontario) Dale Matchett	3

Quarterfinals		Semifinals		Qualifier 7
(British Columbia) Sean Geall	4
(Manitoba) Kerry Burtnyk	10	(Manitoba) Kerry Burtnyk	1
		(Alberta) Kevin Koe	6
				(Alberta) Kevin Koe	6
				(Ontario) Wayne Middaugh	1

Semifinals		Qualifier 8
(Alberta) Ted Appelman	5
(Saskatchewan) Brad Heidt	3	(Alberta) Ted Appelman	6
		(Saskatchewan) Joel Jordison	4

==== Playoffs ====
Quarterfinals
Q2	(Ontario) Glenn Howard	7
Q8	(Alberta) Ted Appelman	4
Q5	(Newfoundland and Labrador) Brad Gushue	4
Q3	(Manitoba) Mike McEwen	5
Q1	(Alberta) Randy Ferbey	7
Q7	(Alberta) Kevin Koe	5
Q4	(Alberta) Kevin Martin	7
Q6	(Manitoba) Jeff Stoughton	5

Semifinals
Q2	(Ontario) Glenn Howard	7
Q3	(Manitoba) Mike McEwen	1
Q1	(Alberta) Randy Ferbey	6
Q4	(Alberta) Kevin Martin	5

Finals
Q2	(Ontario) Glenn Howard	7
Q1	(Alberta) Randy Ferbey	10

== Women's event ==
=== Teams ===
Skip	WCT $ #	CTRS
(Alberta) Cheryl Bernard	4	3
(Saskatchewan) Michelle Englot	7	6
(Saskatchewan) Amber Holland	24	15
(Ontario) Rachel Homan	10	13
(Manitoba) Jennifer Jones	5	5
(Alberta) Cathy King	11	9
(Alberta) Shannon Kleibrink	1	1
(Quebec) Marie-France Larouche	2	2
(Saskatchewan) Stefanie Lawton	3	4
(British Columbia) Marla Mallett	18	10
(Ontario) Krista McCarville	22	16
(Ontario) Sherry Middaugh	6	7
(Alberta) Heather Rankin (Note: Renee Sonnenberg spared for Heather Rankin, but it is Rankin's team.)	14	12
(British Columbia) Kelly Scott	9	8
(Manitoba) Barb Spencer	17	14
(Alberta) Crystal Webster	13	11

=== Results ===
==== A event ====
Quarterfinals
(Alberta) Shannon Kleibrink	7
(Ontario) Krista McCarville	6
(British Columbia) Kelly Scott	7
(Alberta) Cathy King	5
(Saskatchewan) Stefanie Lawton	8
(Ontario) Rachel Homan	6
(Manitoba) Jennifer Jones	7
(Alberta) Heather Rankin	6

Semifinals
(Alberta) Shannon Kleibrink	9
(British Columbia) Kelly Scott	8
(Saskatchewan) Stefanie Lawton	4
(Manitoba) Jennifer Jones	7

Qualifier 1
(Alberta) Shannon Kleibrink	10
(Manitoba) Jennifer Jones	4

Quarterfinals
(Alberta) Cheryl Bernard	9
(Manitoba) Barb Spencer	7
(Saskatchewan) Michelle Englot	11
(Alberta) Crystal Webster	7
(Ontario) Sherry Middaugh	6
(British Columbia) Marla Mallett	0
(Quebec) Marie-France Larouche	0
(Saskatchewan) Amber Holland	6

Semifinals
(Alberta) Cheryl Bernard	10
(Saskatchewan) Michelle Englot	2
(Ontario) Sherry Middaugh	8
(Saskatchewan) Amber Holland	5

Qualifier 2
(Alberta) Cheryl Bernard	8
(Ontario) Sherry Middaugh	2

==== B event ====
Quarterfinals		Semifinals		Qualifier 3
(Ontario) Krista McCarville	9
(Alberta) Cathy King	2	(Ontario) Krista McCarville	5
(Ontario) Rachel Homan	5	(Alberta) Heather Rankin	2
(Alberta) Heather Rankin	7			(Ontario) Krista McCarville	5
				(Ontario) Sherry Middaugh	4

Quarterfinals		Semifinals		Qualifier 4
(Manitoba) Barb Spencer	4
(Alberta) Crystal Webster	8	(Alberta) Crystal Webster	8
(British Columbia) Marla Mallett	9	(British Columbia) Marla Mallett	7
(Quebec) Marie-France Larouche	7			(Alberta) Crystal Webster	5
				(Manitoba) Jennifer Jones	6

Semifinals
1	(British Columbia) Kelly Scott	6
4	(Saskatchewan) Stefanie Lawton	3
3	(Saskatchewan) Michelle Englot	5
2	(Saskatchewan) Amber Holland	4

Qualifier 5
(British Columbia) Kelly Scott	8
(Saskatchewan) Michelle Englot	7

==== C event ====
Quarterfinals		Semifinals		Qualifier 6
(Alberta) Cathy King	4
(Ontario) Rachel Homan	7	(Ontario) Rachel Homan	7
		(Saskatchewan) Amber Holland	2
				(Ontario) Rachel Homan	7
				(Alberta) Crystal Webster	4

Quarterfinals		Semifinals		Qualifier 7
(Manitoba) Barb Spencer	9
(Quebec) Marie-France Larouche	2	(Manitoba) Barb Spencer	7
		(Saskatchewan) Stefanie Lawton	5
				(Manitoba) Barb Spencer	3
				(Ontario) Sherry Middaugh	8

Semifinals		Qualifier 8
(Alberta) Heather Rankin	6
(British Columbia) Marla Mallett	5	(Alberta) Heather Rankin	7
		(Saskatchewan) Michelle Englot	5

==== Playoffs ====
Quarterfinals
(Alberta) Shannon Kleibrink	5
(Ontario) Rachel Homan	3
(British Columbia) Kelly Scott	6
(Ontario) Krista McCarville	3
(Alberta) Cheryl Bernard	4
(Alberta) Heather Rankin	3
(Ontario) Sherry Middaugh	2
(Manitoba) Jennifer Jones	9

Semifinals
(Alberta) Shannon Kleibrink	8
(British Columbia) Kelly Scott	3
(Alberta) Cheryl Bernard	4
(Manitoba) Jennifer Jones	8

Finals
(Alberta) Shannon Kleibrink	7
(Manitoba) Jennifer Jones	9
