= 2007 Canadian Mixed Curling Championship =

- Host city: Kitchener, Ontario
- Arena: Westmount Golf and Country Club
- Dates: November 11–18, 2006
- Winner: New Brunswick
- Curling club: Beausejour Curling Club, Moncton & Thistle-St. Andrew's Curling Club, Saint John, New Brunswick
- Skip: Terry Odishaw
- Third: Becky Atkinson
- Second: Kevin Boyle
- Lead: Jane Boyle
- Finalist: Quebec (Ève Bélisle)

The 2007 Forbes Canadian Mixed Curling Championship was held November 11–18, 2006 at the Westmount Golf and Country Club in Kitchener, Ontario. New Brunswick would win the event, only the province's second Mixed title. They were skipped by Terry Odishaw who defeated Quebec in the final. Quebec was skipped by the only female skip in the tournament, Ève Bélisle who also finished the round robin in first place.

== Teams ==
Locale	Skip	Third	Second	Lead
Alberta	Ted Appelman	Heather Nedohin	David Harper	Kate Horne
British Columbia	Brad Kuhn	Stephanie Jackson	Jock Tyre	Heather Mockford
Manitoba	Terry McNamee	Lana Hunter	Geordie Hargreaves	Tanya Enns
New Brunswick	Terry Odishaw	Becky Atkinson	Kevin Boyle	Jane Boyle
Newfoundland and Labrador	Trent Skanes	Stacie Devereaux	Andrew Mercer	Steph LeDrew
Northern Ontario	Tim Phillips	Vicky Barrett	Lloyd Bigras	Andrea Souliere
Nova Scotia	Alan Darragh	Tracey Leslie	Owen Graham	Denice Nicholson
Ontario	John Epping	Julie Reddick	Scott Foster	Melissa Foster
Prince Edward Island	Mike Gaudet	Suzanne Gaudet	Craig Arsenault	Leslie MacDougall
Quebec	Ève Bélisle	Mark McClory	Martine Comeau	Christian Bouchard
Saskatchewan	Brad Heidt	Darlene Gillies	Drew Heidt	Tracy Heidt
Northwest Territories/Yukon	Manny Arey	Evelyn Storr	Robert McLeod	Judy McLeod

== Standings ==
Province	Skip	Wins	Losses
Quebec	Ève Bélisle	9	2
New Brunswick	Terry Odishaw	8	3
Manitoba	Terry McNamee	7	4
British Columbia	Brad Kuhn	7	4
Alberta	Ted Appelman	7	4
Ontario	John Epping	6	5
Saskatchewan	Brad Heidt	6	5
Northern Ontario	Tim Phillips	5	6
Newfoundland and Labrador	Trent Skanes	5	6
Prince Edward Island	Mike Gaudet	4	7
Nova Scotia	Alan Darragh	2	9
Northwest Territories/Yukon	Manny Arey	0	11

== Playoffs ==
- Tie-breakers
  - Alberta 7-5 British Columbia
  - Manitoba 7-6 Alberta
- Semi-final: New Brunswick 8-7 Manitoba
- Final: New Brunswick 6-4 Quebec
