= Gimli Curling Club =

Curling club in Gimli, Manitoba

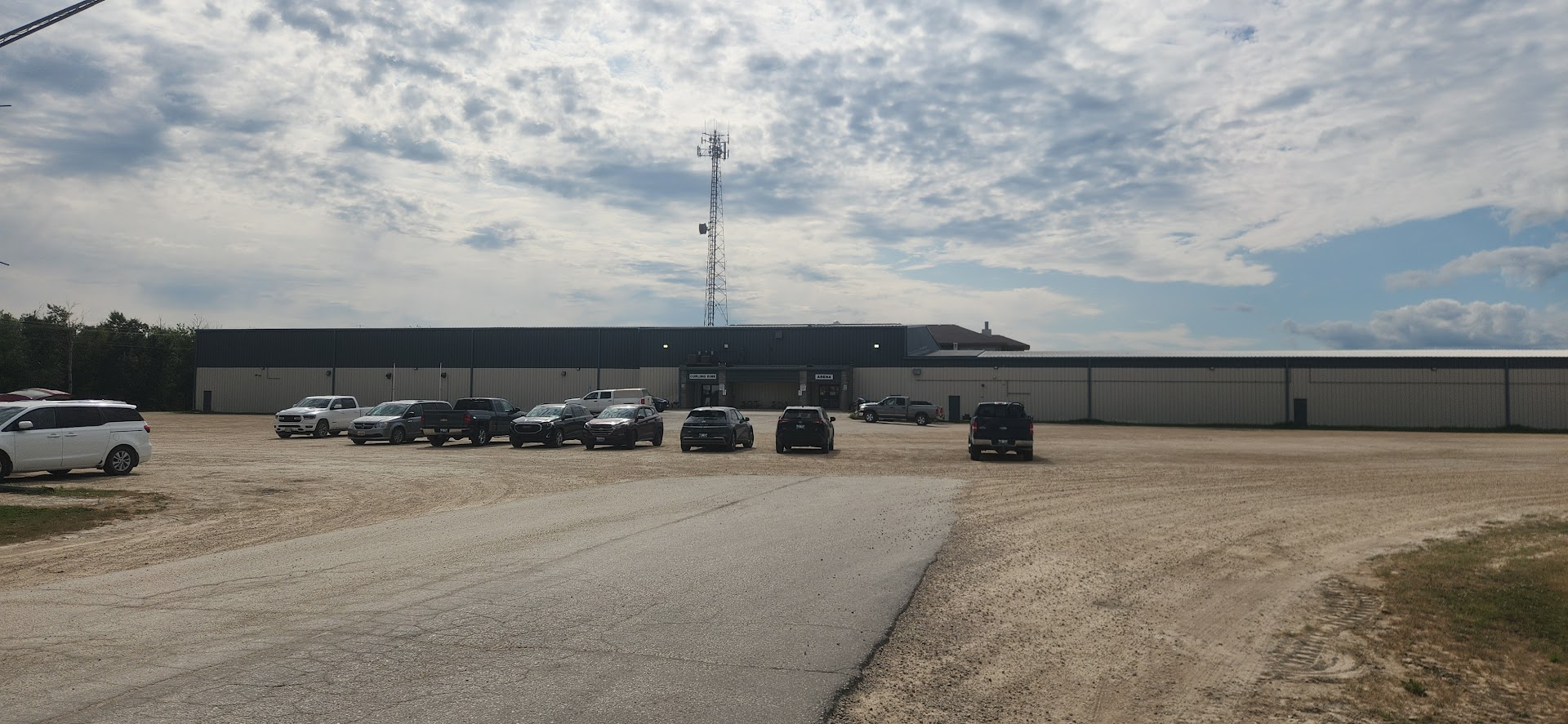
- Gimli Curling Club
- Interactive map of Gimli Curling Club
- Location: 45 Centennial Road, Gimli, Manitoba; Canada; 50.63355°N 97.00205°W

Information
- Established: 1939
- Club type: Dedicated ice
- Curling Canada region: Curl Manitoba
- Sheets of ice: five
- Website: https://www.gimlicurlingclub.ca

The Gimli Curling Club is a curling club in Gimli, Manitoba which first opened in 1939, and the current facility used today opened in 1969. The club is home to several prominent curlers, including Kerri Einarson, a multiple-time Scotties Tournament of Hearts champion.

== History ==
Curling is a popular and historic winter activity for the town of Gimli in part of the activities of the Gimli Curling Club. Gimli's first dedicated curling facility, a two-sheet rink, opened in 1939, which saw 17 rinks participate in the small community. by the late 1940s and early 1950s, the club had become both a sporting and social centre for the town.

As participation continued to grow, the community began fundraising efforts in 1953 to construct a larger and more modern facility. The plan was to raise money for a four-sheet curling centre that would include artificial ice making, a bar, and a clubhouse for members. The new facility eventually opened in the winter of 1969. The addition of artificial ice allowed for more reliable playing conditions, while the canteen and clubhouse expanded the club's role as a gathering place.

== Amenities ==
The Gimli Curling Club now has five curling sheets along with the canteen grill and a modern clubhouse with locker room facilities. The club itself shared a building with the communities recreation centre, a banquest space, and an ice skating rink.

== Events ==
The Gimli Curling Club host an annual Men's Bonspiel. This bonspiel has become a prominent multi-day tournament featuring professionally ranked players, multiple events, a Calcutta auction fundraiser, and a send-off celebration for Team Canada curlers. The club also hosts an annual Ladies Bonspiel as well with similar features.

The Club has also hosted the Bunge Berth Bonspiel. This Bonspiel is a competitive event that attracts high-level Manitoba teams and serves as a qualifying competition within the provincial curling system.

Manitoba's premier two-person stick bonsiel is also hosted at the Gimli Curling Club.

Historically, the club has also hosted the Pharmasave Gimli Classic. This tournament was a part of the a Manitoba Curling Tour and for a few years the World Curling Tour. This tournament regularly attracted Manitoba's top curlers and offered a significant prize money, making it one of the more prominent competitive bonspiels in the province.

== Honours ==
Honours won by curlers representing the Gimli Curling Club
Honour	Year(s)	Curler or Team
Scotties Tournament of Hearts Champion	2020, 2021, 2022, 2023, 2026	Team Kerri Einarson
Scotties Tournament of Hearts Silver Medal	2018	Kerri Einarson
World Women's Curling Championship Silver Medal	2026	Team Kerri Einarson
World Women's Curling Championship Bronze Medal	2022, 2023	Team Kerri Einarson
Pan Continental Curling Championship Bronze Medal	2022	Team Kerri Einarson
Grand Slam of Curling National Champion	2016	Team Kerri Einarson
Players' Championship Champion	2019, 2021	Team Kerri Einarson
Champions Cup Champion	2022	Team Kerri Einarson
Masters Champion	2022	Team Kerri Einarson
Tour Challenge Champion	2024	Team Kerri Einarson
Canadian Mixed Doubles Champion	2021	Kerri Einarson
Manitoba Curling Club Championship (Men)	2023, 2025	Derrick Anderson team
Asham U-18 Women's Championship	2025	Caitlyn McPherson team
World Mixed Doubles Bronze Medal	2026	Kadriana Lott and Colton Lott
