= Astec Safety Challenge =

Annual men's curling tournament in Canada

- Established: 1987; 2024 (revival)
- Host city: Lloydminster, Saskatchewan
- Arena: Lloydminster Curling Club
- Purse: $125,000

Current champions (2025)
- Men: (Manitoba) Matt Dunstone

The ASTEC Safety Challenge is an annual men's curling tournament held at the Lloydminster Curling Club in Lloydminster, Saskatchewan. The total purse for the event is $125,000, one of the largest purses outside of the Grand Slams. It is part of the Players' Tour. It is held every January a week prior whichever Grand Slam event is held in the month.

The event is a revival of the Best Western Wayside Inn Curling Classic World Curling Tour event which started in 1987 and was discontinued after 2008. It was restarted in 2024 as a partnership of Astec Safety and Team Brendan Bottcher.

In May 2025, it was announced that the 2026 edition will not be held so as to avoid conflict with the 2026 Winter Olympics.

== Winners ==
=== Astec Safety Challenge ===
Year	Champion team	Runner-up team	Purse
2024	(Alberta) Kevin Koe, Tyler Tardi, Jacques Gauthier, Karrick Martin	(Manitoba) Reid Carruthers, Brad Jacobs, Derek Samagalski, Connor Njegovan	$102,000
2025	(Manitoba) Matt Dunstone, Colton Lott, E. J. Harnden, Ryan Harnden	(Saskatchewan) Mike McEwen, Colton Flasch, Kevin Marsh, Dan Marsh	$125,000
2026	Not held		

=== Wayside Inn Curling Classic ===
Year	Champion skip	Runner-up skip	Purse
1987	(Saskatchewan) Eugene Hritzuk	(Saskatchewan) Rick Folk	$20,500
1988	(Saskatchewan) Arnold Anderson	(Saskatchewan) Lyle Muyres	$30,000
1989	(Saskatchewan) Lyle Muyres	(Saskatchewan) Bill Knight	$30,500
1990	(Saskatchewan) Brad Heidt	(Alberta) Mike Vavrek	$35,000
1991	(Saskatchewan) Mark Dacey	(Saskatchewan) Lyle Muyres	$40,000
1992	(Manitoba) Vic Peters	(Alberta) Don Walchuk	$40,000
1993	(Saskatchewan) Mark Dacey	(Alberta) Greg Ferster	$40,000
1994	(Alberta) Ed Lukowich	(Alberta) Kurt Balderston	$40,500
1995	(Alberta) Lowell Peterman	(Saskatchewan) Rod Montgomery	
1996	(Saskatchewan) Rob Ewen	(Manitoba) Jeff Stoughton	
1997	(Alberta) Doug Walker	(Alberta) Randy Ferbey	$45,000
1998	(Saskatchewan) Bruce Korte	(Saskatchewan) Art Paulsen	
1999	(British Columbia) Bert Gretzinger	(Alberta) Kevin Koe	
2000	(Saskatchewan) Rob Ewen	?	$50,500
2001	(Switzerland) Andreas Schwaller	(Saskatchewan) Bruce Korte	$49,400
2002	(Saskatchewan) Glen Despins	(British Columbia) Brent Pierce	$50,500
2003	(Alberta) John Morris	(Alberta) Randy Ferbey	$50,000
2004	(British Columbia) Pat Ryan	(Alberta) Jamie King	$52,800
2005	(Alberta) Mark Johnson	(Alberta) Ryan Keane	$52,800
2006	(Ontario) Glenn Howard	(Manitoba) Kerry Burtnyk	$75,000
2007	(Manitoba) Jeff Stoughton	(Ontario) Glenn Howard	$75,000
2008	(Alberta) Kevin Martin	(Alberta) Warren Hassall	$81,000
