= Pharmasave Gimli Classic =

The Pharmasave Gimli Classic was a bonspiel, or curling tournament, that took place at either the Gimli Curling Club or the Gimli Recreation Centre in Gimli, Manitoba. It was part of the Manitoba Curling Tour and sometimes part of the World Curling Tour. It ran from at least 2002 to 2009, and has not been held since.

The 2012 event was scheduled to be held from February 3 to 5 as part of the 2011–12 World Curling Tour, but was cancelled.

== Past champions ==
Only skip's name is displayed.

Year	Winning team	Runner up team	Purse (CAD)
2002	(Manitoba) Scott McFadyen	(Manitoba) Duane Grierson	
2003	(Manitoba) Chris Galbraith	(Manitoba) Ian Beavis	
2004	(Manitoba) Vic Peters	(Manitoba) Chris Galbraith	$14,500
2005	(Manitoba) Brendan Taylor	(Manitoba) Andrew Wickman	$14,500
2006	(Manitoba) Pete Nicholls	(Manitoba) Vic Peters	$14,500
2007	(Manitoba) Chris Galbraith	(Manitoba) Daley Peters	$14,500
2008	(Manitoba) Peter Nicholls	(Manitoba) Bob Sigurdson	
2009	(Manitoba) Brendan Taylor	(Manitoba) Reid Carruthers	
2010	Cancelled		
2012	Cancelled		$14,500
