= Bern Open (curling) =

Curling tournament

The Bern Open was an annual curling tournament held at the Bern CC in Bern, Switzerland. It was part of the World Curling Tour, and took place during the 7th week of the tour. The tournament was held using a triple-knockout format.

== Past champions ==
Only skip's name is displayed.

Year	Winning team	Runner up team	Purse (CHF)
1992	(Switzerland) Felix Luchsinger		
1994	(Switzerland) Markus Eggler	(Switzerland) Felix Luchsinger	30,000
1995	(Canada) Arnold Asham	(Scotland) David Smith	
2000	(Canada) Greg McAulay	(Switzerland) Bernhard Werthermann	
2002	(Canada) Randy Ferbey	(Canada) Peter Steski	
2003	(Canada) Randy Ferbey	(Switzerland) Yannick Renggli	64,000
2004	(Switzerland) Björn Zyrd	(Scotland) David Murdoch	62,650
2005	(Canada) Mark Dacey	(Canada) Pat Ryan	60,400
2006	(Sweden) Nils Carlsén	(Switzerland) Patrick Vuille	32,624
2007	(Canada) Russ Howard	(Switzerland) Ralph Stöckli	42,000
2008	(Germany) Andy Kapp	(Switzerland) Ralph Stöckli	42,000
2009	(Norway) Thomas Ulsrud	(Canada) Russ Howard	42,000
2010	(Switzerland) Thomas Lips	(Scotland) Hammy McMillan	42,000
