= Grasshopper Women's Masters =

Annual women's World Curling Tour event

The Grasshopper Women's Masters (formerly the Zurich Women's Masters) was an annual women's World Curling Tour event held at the Grasshopper Curling Club in Zürich, Switzerland. The inaugural event was held in 2007.

== Champions ==
| Year | Winning skip | Runner-up skip | Purse (CHF) |
|---|---|---|---|
| 2007 | (Switzerland) Irene Schori | (Switzerland) Binia Feltscher-Beeli | 14,143 |
| 2008 | (Germany) Andrea Schöpp | (Switzerland) Michèle Jäggi | 25,000 |
| 2009 | (Germany) Andrea Schöpp | (United States) Debbie McCormick | 25,000 |
| 2010 | (Switzerland) Mirjam Ott | (Russia) Liudmila Privivkova | 33,000 |
