= Skookum WCT Cash Spiel =

Former World Curling Tour event

The Skookum WCT Cash Spiel was an annual bonspiel, or curling tournament, that took place at the Whitehorse Curling Club in Whitehorse, Yukon. The tournament was held in a round-robin format. The tournament, sponsored by Skookum Asphalt, ran from 2006 to 2010 and was a major event on the World Curling Tour. Curlers from Alberta dominated the event, with Albertan teams winning 4 of the 5 events.

== Past champions ==
Only skip's name is displayed.

Year	Winning team	Runner up team	Purse (CAD)
2006	(Alberta) Randy Ferbey		
2007	(British Columbia) Steve Waatainen	(Alberta) Ron Chrenek	$30,000
2008	(Alberta) Chris Schille	(Washington (state)) Jason Larway	$50,000
2009	(Alberta) Kevin Martin	(British Columbia) Sean Geall	$50,000
2010	(Alberta) Kevin Koe	(British Columbia) Greg McAulay	$42,000
