= 2010 Quebec Scotties Tournament of Hearts =

The 2010 Quebec Scotties Tournament of Hearts was held January 4-10, 2010 at the Montreal West Curling Club in Montreal West. The winner represented team Quebec at the 2010 Scotties Tournament of Hearts in Sault Ste. Marie, Ontario

== Teams ==
Skip	Third	Second	Lead	Curling Club
Ève Bélisle	Brenda Nicholls	Martine Comeau	Julie Rainville	TMR Curling Club, Mont-Royal / Club de curling Etchemin, Saint-Romuald
Annie Cadorette	Sophie Morissette	Anik Brascoup	Katian Brascoup	Club de curling Longue-Pointe, Montreal / Club de curling Trois-Rivières, Trois-Rivières
Audrée Dufresne	Marie-Christinie Cantin	Virginie Lessard	Sasha Beauchamp	TMR Curling Club, Mont-Royal / Club de curling Etchemin, Saint-Romuald
Karla Ekdom-Delorme	Lara Autio	Sue Gibson	Desiree Morgan	Baid d'Urfé Curling Club, Baie-d'Urfé
Saskia Hollands	Christie Lang	France Charette	Candide Hébert	Club de curling Lacolle, Lacolle
Marie-France Larouche	Nancy Bélanger	Annie Lemay	Joëlle Sabourin	Club de curling Etchemin, Saint-Romuald
Chantal Osborne	Joëlle Belley	Agnes Lanthier	Sylvie Daniel	Club de curling Thurso, Thurso / Glenmore Curling Club, Dollard-des-Ormeaux
Hélène Pelchat	Claudy Daoust	Martine Deschênes	Chantal Royer	Club de curling Valleyfield, Salaberry-de-Valleyfield / Club de curling Victoria, Sainte-Foy
Allison Ross	Kimberly Mastine	Catherine Derick	Kimberly Beardsell	Club de curling Ormstown, Ormstown / Club de curling Windsor, Windsor / TMR Curling Club, Mont-Royal
Debbie Waller	Joan Fraser Burton	Maureen McDougall	Lorraine Lamb Lalonde	Club de curling Ormstown, Ormstown / Club de curling Lacolle, Lacolle

== Standings ==
Skip	W	L
Larouche	8	1
Ross	7	2
Bélisle	6	3
Hollands	6	3
Osborne	5	4
Pelchat	4	4
Dufresne	4	5
Cadorette	3	6
Waller	2	7
Ekdom-Delorme	0	9

== Results ==
=== Draw 1 ===
January 4, 9:00 AM

Sheet A	1	2	3	4	5	6	7	8	9	10	Final
Osborne	0	2	2	0	0	2	0	0	0	X	6
Pelchat	1	0	0	2	2	0	1	2	1	X	10

Sheet B	1	2	3	4	5	6	7	8	9	10	Final
Waller	0	2	0	0	1	0	1	0	X	X	4
Belisle	1	0	5	0	0	3	0	1	X	X	10

Sheet C	1	2	3	4	5	6	7	8	9	10	Final
Larouche	0	1	1	0	4	1	2	X	X	X	9
Dufesne	0	0	0	3	0	0	0	X	X	X	3

Sheet D	1	2	3	4	5	6	7	8	9	10	Final
Cadorette	0	0	1	1	1	0	0	1	0	2	6
Ross	2	0	0	0	0	2	0	0	1	0	5

=== Draw 2 ===
January 4, 2:00 PM

Sheet B	1	2	3	4	5	6	7	8	9	10	Final
Hollands	5	0	1	0	0	0	3	0	X	X	9
Ekdom-Delorme	0	1	0	0	2	0	0	1	X	X	4

Sheet C	1	2	3	4	5	6	7	8	9	10	Final
Waller	0	1	0	1	0	1	0	X	X	X	3
Ross	3	0	1	0	3	0	4	X	X	X	11

=== Draw 3 ===
January 4, 7:00 PM

Sheet A	1	2	3	4	5	6	7	8	9	10	Final
Cadorette	1	0	0	0	1	0	X	X	X	X	2
Lauroche	0	3	1	1	0	3	X	X	X	X	8

Sheet B	1	2	3	4	5	6	7	8	9	10	Final
Pelchat	0	1	0	4	1	0	1	0	2	X	9
Dufresne	0	0	3	0	0	3	0	1	0	X	7

Sheet C	1	2	3	4	5	6	7	8	9	10	Final
Ekdom-Delorme	0	0	1	1	1	1	0	2	1	0	7
Belisle	2	2	0	0	0	0	2	0	0	2	8

Sheet D	1	2	3	4	5	6	7	8	9	10	Final
Hollands	1	2	1	0	1	0	1	0	1	X	7
Osborne	0	0	0	3	0	1	0	1	0	X	5

=== Draw 4 ===
January 5, 9:00 AM

Sheet B	1	2	3	4	5	6	7	8	9	10	Final
Cadorette	0	0	0	1	0	0	2	0	1	X	4
Osborne	0	1	1	0	2	1	0	1	0	X	6

Sheet C	1	2	3	4	5	6	7	8	9	10	Final
Waller	0	0	4	0	2	1	0	1	3	X	11
Ekdom-Delorme	2	1	0	2	0	0	1	0	0	X	6

=== Draw 5 ===
January 5, 2:00 PM

Sheet A	1	2	3	4	5	6	7	8	9	10	Final
Pelchat	1	0	0	3	1	1	0	4	X	X	10
Waller	0	1	2	0	0	0	2	0	X	X	5

Sheet B	1	2	3	4	5	6	7	8	9	10	Final
Ross	1	0	3	0	3	3	X	X	X	X	10
Ekdom-Delorme	0	1	0	1	0	0	X	X	X	X	2

Sheet C	1	2	3	4	5	6	7	8	9	10	Final
Hollands	0	2	0	2	1	0	0	X	X	X	5
Larouche	2	0	2	0	0	3	4	X	X	X	11

Sheet D	1	2	3	4	5	6	7	8	9	10	Final
Dufresne	1	0	1	0	2	0	0	2	0	X	6
Belisle	0	1	0	2	0	2	1	0	3	X	9

=== Draw 6 ===
January 5, 7:00 PM

Sheet A	1	2	3	4	5	6	7	8	9	10	Final
Dufresne	3	2	0	1	0	2	X	X	X	X	8
Cadorette	0	0	1	0	1	0	X	X	X	X	2

Sheet B	1	2	3	4	5	6	7	8	9	10	Final
Larouche	0	2	2	1	0	1	0	0	3	0	9
Osborne	2	0	0	0	2	0	2	3	0	2	11

Sheet C	1	2	3	4	5	6	7	8	9	10	Final
Belisle	0	1	1	0	2	0	1	0	2	0	7
Ross	3	0	0	1	0	2	0	1	0	1	8

Sheet D	1	2	3	4	5	6	7	8	9	10	Final
Pelchat	0	2	0	0	1	0	1	0	0	X	4
Hollands	2	0	2	0	0	1	0	1	0	X	6

=== Draw 7 ===
January 6, 9:00 AM

Sheet A	1	2	3	4	5	6	7	8	9	10	Final
Ross	1	0	0	2	0	1	0	1	1	X	6
Pelchat	0	0	2	0	1	0	1	0	0	X	4

Sheet B	1	2	3	4	5	6	7	8	9	10	Final
Belisle	1	0	4	0	0	3	0	1	0	1	10
Hollands	0	1	0	2	1	0	4	0	0	0	8

Sheet D	1	2	3	4	5	6	7	8	9	10	Final
Larouche	2	2	0	3	2	0	X	X	X	X	9
Waller	0	0	1	0	0	1	X	X	X	X	2

=== Draw 8 ===
January 6, 2:00 PM

Sheet A	1	2	3	4	5	6	7	8	9	10	Final
Osborne	0	0	1	1	1	0	0	2	0	1	6
Belisle	0	1	0	0	0	2	0	0	1	0	4

Sheet C	1	2	3	4	5	6	7	8	9	10	Final
Dufresne	0	2	0	4	0	0	0	3	0	X	9
Ekdom-Delorme	1	0	1	0	2	1	0	0	1	X	6

Sheet D	1	2	3	4	5	6	7	8	9	10	Final
Hollands	1	2	0	2	0	3	3	X	X	X	11
Cadorette	0	0	1	0	2	0	0	X	X	X	3

=== Draw 9 ===
January 6, 7:00 PM

Sheet A	1	2	3	4	5	6	7	8	9	10	Final
Larouche	4	2	2	0	3	X	X	X	X	X	11
Ekdom-Delorme	0	0	0	1	0	X	X	X	x	X	1

Sheet B	1	2	3	4	5	6	7	8	9	10	Final
Cadorette	0	1	0	1	4	0	0	0	3	X	9
Pelchat	1	0	2	0	0	3	0	1	0	X	7

Sheet C	1	2	3	4	5	6	7	8	9	10	Final
Osborne	3	0	0	2	3	0	4	X	X	X	12
Waller	0	0	1	0	0	1	0	X	X	X	2

Sheet D	1	2	3	4	5	6	7	8	9	10	Final
Ross	0	3	3	0	3	1	X	X	X	X	10
Dufresne	2	0	0	1	0	0	X	X	X	X	3

=== Draw 10 ===
January 7, 9:00 AM

Sheet A	1	2	3	4	5	6	7	8	9	10	Final
Hollands	0	1	0	1	1	1	2	0	1	X	7
Dufrensne	1	0	1	0	0	0	0	2	0	X	4

Sheet C	1	2	3	4	5	6	7	8	9	10	Final
Pelchat	0	2	0	1	0	0	1	0	0	0	4
Larouche	2	0	1	0	2	0	0	0	0	2	7

=== Draw 11 ===
January 7, 2:00 PM

Sheet A	1	2	3	4	5	6	7	8	9	10	Final
Ekdom-Delorme	1	0	0	1	0	0	0	0	X	X	2
Osborne	0	3	0	0	2	1	2	0	X	X	8

Sheet B	1	2	3	4	5	6	7	8	9	10	Final
Dufresne	0	1	0	1	0	3	0	3	2	0	10
Waller	1	0	2	0	3	0	2	0	0	1	9

Sheet C	1	2	3	4	5	6	7	8	9	10	Final
Ross	0	3	0	0	0	2	0	3	1	X	9
Hollands	2	0	0	1	0	0	2	0	0	X	5

Sheet D	1	2	3	4	5	6	7	8	9	10	Final
Bélisle	2	2	1	0	2	0	0	1	0	X	8
Cadorette	0	0	0	2	0	1	1	0	1	X	5

=== Draw 12 ===
January 7, 7:00 PM

Sheet A	1	2	3	4	5	6	7	8	9	10	11	Final
Belisle	0	2	0	1	0	2	0	0	1	1	0	7
Larouche	2	0	1	0	1	0	2	1	0	0	2	9

Sheet B	1	2	3	4	5	6	7	8	9	10	Final
Osborne	0	0	2	0	0	0	2	0	X	X	4
Ross	0	1	0	1	2	3	0	1	X	X	9

Sheet C	1	2	3	4	5	6	7	8	9	10	Final
Waller	0	0	3	0	0	1	1	1	2	X	8
Cadorette	1	2	0	1	1	0	0	0	0	X	5

Sheet D	1	2	3	4	5	6	7	8	9	10	Final
Ekdom-Delorme	0	1	0	0	0	1	1	0	0	X	3
Pelchat	0	0	2	1	0	0	0	2	1	X	6

=== Draw 13 ===
January 8, 9:00 AM

Sheet A	1	2	3	4	5	6	7	8	9	10	Final
Waller	0	0	0	0	2	0	0	0	X	X	2
Hollands	1	2	1	1	0	1	1	2	X	X	9

Sheet B	1	2	3	4	5	6	7	8	9	10	Final
Ekdom-Delorme	0	1	0	0	0	2	0	3	0	X	6
Cadorette	1	0	4	0	1	0	2	0	4	X	12

=== Draw 14 ===
January 8, 2:00 PM

Sheet B	1	2	3	4	5	6	7	8	9	10	Final
Pelchat	0	2	1	0	0	0	0	2	2	0	7
Belisle	2	0	0	0	2	0	2	0	0	2	8

Sheet C	1	2	3	4	5	6	7	8	9	10	Final
Dufresne	0	4	0	1	0	2	0	0	2	X	9
Osborne	1	0	1	0	1	0	1	1	0	X	5

Sheet D	1	2	3	4	5	6	7	8	9	10	Final
Ross	1	0	1	0	1	1	0	1	0	0	5
Larouche	0	1	0	1	0	0	1	0	3	2	8

== Playoffs ==
Page playoff system
1	Marie-France Larouche	8
2	Allison Ross	3
3	Ève Bélisle	11
4	Saskia Hollands	5

Semifinal
2	Allison Ross	4
3	Ève Bélisle	8

Final
1	Marie-France Larouche	5
3	Ève Bélisle	7

=== 1 vs. 2 ===
January 9, 2:00 PM

Team	1	2	3	4	5	6	7	8	9	10	Final
Larouche	1	0	3	1	0	3	0	0	X	X	8
Ross	0	1	0	0	2	0	0	0	X	X	3

=== 3 vs. 4 ===
January 9, 2:00 PM

Team	1	2	3	4	5	6	7	8	9	10	Final
Bélisle	1	2	0	2	0	3	0	3	X	X	11
Hollands	0	0	1	0	1	0	3	0	X	X	5

=== Semifinal ===
January 9, 7:00 PM

Team	1	2	3	4	5	6	7	8	9	10	Final
Ross	0	0	1	0	1	1	1	0	0	X	4
Bélisle	0	2	0	3	0	0	0	3	0	X	8

=== Final ===
January 10, 1:30 PM

Team	1	2	3	4	5	6	7	8	9	10	Final
Larouche	0	0	1	0	0	1	1	0	2	0	5
Bélisle	0	1	0	0	2	0	0	1	0	3	7
