= 2009 Quebec Scotties Tournament of Hearts =

Women's curling championship

The 2009 Quebec Scotties Tournament of Hearts, Quebec's women's provincial curling championship, was held January 19-25 at the Club de curling Trois-Rivières in Trois-Rivières. The winning Marie-France Larouche rink represented team Quebec at the 2009 Scotties Tournament of Hearts in Victoria, British Columbia.

== Teams ==
Skip	Third	Second	Lead	Club(s)
Ève Bélisle	Brenda Nicholls	Martine Comeau	Julie Rainville	TMR Curling Club, Mont-Royal; Club de curling Etchemin, Saint-Romuald; Club de curling Victoria, Sainte-Foy
Véronique Brassard	Joëlle Belley	Amélie Blais	Ann-Marie Filteau	Club de curling Etchemin, Saint-Romuald; Glenmore Curling Club, Dollard-des-Ormeaux
Annie Cadorette	Jennifer Gaboury	Anik Brascoup	Marie-Pierre Poirier	Club de curling Longue-Pointe, Montreal; Club de curling Laviolette, Trois-Rivières
Gaétane Tremblay	Claudy Daoust	Martine Deschênes	Chantal Royer	Club de curling de la Vallée, Amqui; Club de curling Victoria, Sainte-Foy
Johanne Tremblay	Véronique Gingras	Camille Tremblay	Lucie Roy	Lachine Curling Club, Lachine; Club de curling Trois-Rivières, Trois-Rivières; St-Lambert Curling Club, Saint Lambert
Marie-France Larouche	Nancy Bélanger	Annie Lemay	Joëlle Sabourin	Club de curling Etchemin, Saint-Romuald
Karine Marchand	Sophie Morissette	Isabelle Vallée	Kim Beardsell	Club de curling Portneuf, Donnacona; Club de curling Jacques-Cartier, Sillery; TMR Club, Mont-Royal
Chantal Osborne	Agnes Lanthier	Virginie Lessard	Sylvie Daniel	Club de curling Thurso, Thurso; Glenmore Curling Club, Dollard-des-Ormeaux
Allison Ross	Kimberley Mastine	Catherine Derick	Marie-Josée Fortier	Club de curling Ormstown, Ormstown
Élaine Roy	Marie-Josée Précourt	Joëlle Turcotte	Johanne Cossette	Club de curling Kénogami, Jonquière; Club de curling Riverbend, Alma; Club de curling du Cap, Cap-de-la-Madeleine

== Standings ==
Team	W	L
Larouche	8	1
Bélisle	8	1
Ross	6	3
Brassard	6	3
Osborne	5	4
Roy	4	5
Marchand	3	6
Cadorette	3	6
G. Tremblay	2	7
J. Tremblay	0	9

== Scores ==
=== January 19 ===
- Ross 10-1 G. Tremblay
- Bélisle 11-2 J. Tremblay
- Brassard 9-2 Marchand
- Roy 7-6 Osborne
- Bélisle 9-7 Marchand
- Larouche 9-3 Cadorette
- Brassard 11-3 Roy
- Osborne 10-3 Cadorette
- Larouche 9-3 Ross
- G. Tremblay 10-5 J. Tremblay

=== January 20 ===
- Bélisle 8-2 Brassard
- Ross 6-3 Roy
- Larouche 9-4 Osborne
- Ross 10-2 J. Tremblay
- Marchand 7-1 Roy
- Bélisle 8-5 Cadorette
- Brassard 8-6 G. Tremblay
- Larouche 9-3 G. Tremblay
- Osborne 10-7 J. Tremblay
- Marchand 9-5 Cadorette

=== January 21 ===
- Brassard 7-3 J. Tremblay
- Ross 10-2 Cadorette
- Roy 10-2 G. Tremblay
- Bélisle 10-7 Osborne
- Larouche 10-3 Marchand
- Brassard 7-5 Osborne
- Roy 12-9 Cadorette
- Bélisle 6-5 G. Tremblay
- Larouche 14-0 J. Tremblay
- Ross 11-8 Marchand

=== January 22 ===
- Osborne 10-6 G. Tremblay
- Marchand 11-4 J. Tremblay
- Cadorette 9-6 Brassard
- Larouche 9-2 Roy
- Cadorette 8-7 G. Tremblay
- Bélisle 9-7 Ross
- Larouche 9-4 Bélisle
- Ross 7-2 Brassard
- Osborne 8-2 Marchand
- Roy 7-5 J. Tremblay

=== January 23 ===
- Osborne 8-7 Ross
- G. Tremblay 6-2 Marchand
- Bélisle 8-5 Roy
- Cadorette 7-2 J. Tremblay
- Brassard 7-5 Larouche

== Page playoffs ==
1 vs. 2, 3 vs. 4, and semi-final on January 24. Final on January 25.

Page playoff system
1	Marie-France Larouche	9
2	Ève Bélisle	4
3	Allison Ross	11
4	Véronique Brassard	4

Semifinal
2	Ève Bélisle	10
3	Allison Ross	5

Final
1	Marie-France Larouche	7
2	Ève Bélisle	2

=== 3 vs. 4 ===
Sheet C	1	2	3	4	5	6	7	8	9	10	Final
Allison Ross 🔨	0	0	3	0	2	0	1	0	5	X	11
Véronique Brassard	0	0	0	2	0	1	0	1	0	X	4

=== 1 vs. 2 ===
Sheet B	1	2	3	4	5	6	7	8	9	10	Final
Marie-France Larouche 🔨	1	2	0	3	0	1	0	2	X	X	9
Ève Bélisle	0	0	2	0	2	0	0	0	X	X	4

=== Semi-final ===
Sheet B	1	2	3	4	5	6	7	8	9	10	Final
Allison Ross	0	0	1	0	2	0	2	0	0	X	5
Ève Bélisle 🔨	2	0	0	4	0	1	0	2	1	X	10

=== Final ===
Sheet B	1	2	3	4	5	6	7	8	9	10	Final
Marie-France Larouche 🔨	0	1	0	2	0	3	0	1	0	X	7
Ève Bélisle	0	0	0	0	1	0	1	0	0	X	2
