= 2011 Quebec Scotties Tournament of Hearts =

The 2011 Quebec Scotties Tournament of Hearts was held January 30- February 6, 2011 at the Centre sportif de Buckingham in Buckingham, Quebec. The winning team of Marie-France Larouche represented team Quebec at the 2011 Scotties Tournament of Hearts in Charlottetown, Prince Edward Island, finishing the round robin with a record 4-7, the first time in four Scotties Larouche did not make the playoffs.

== Teams ==
Skip	Vice	Second	Lead	Club
Ève Bélisle	Brenda Nicholls	Martine Comeau	Julie Rainville	TMR Curling Club, Mont-Royal / Club de curling Etchemin, Saint-Romuald
Joëlle Belley	Kristen Richard	Brittany O'Rourke	Agnes Lanthier	Glenmore Curling Club, Dollard-des-Ormeaux
Siân Canavan	Marion Van Horn	Debby Ship	Sandy Friesen	Royal Montreal Curling Club, Montreal / Montreal West Curling Club, Montreal
Marie-Christine Cantin	Anne-Marie Filteau	Virginie Lessard	Anik Brascoup	Club de curling Etchemin, Saint-Romuald, Quebec
Julie Hamel	Noémie Verreault	Marie-Pier Côté	Joëlle St-Hilaire	Club de Curling de Chicoutimi Inc, Chicoutimi
Marie-France Larouche	Annie Lemay	Véronique Grégoire	Véronique Brassard	Club de curling Etchemin, Saint-Romuald, Quebec
Kim Mastine	Nathalie Audet	Audrée Dufresne	Saskia Hollands	Club de curling Lacolle, Lacolle
Chantal Osborne	Joëlle Sabourin	Catherine Derick	Sylvie Daniel	Club de curling Thurso, Thurso
Hélène Pelchat	Claudy Daoust	Martine Deschênes	Chantal Royer	Club de curling Victoria, Quebec City
Laura Thomas	Maria Santella	Andrea White-Lambert	Guelena Chanchourova	Glenmore Curling Club, Dollard-des-Ormeaux

== Standings ==
Skip (Club)	W	L	PF	PA	Ends Won	Ends Lost	Blank Ends	Stolen Ends
Chantal Osborne (Thurso)	7	2	66	42	40	33	7	16
Marie-France Larouche (Etchemin)	7	2	81	38	40	28	6	14
Kim Mastine (Lacolle)	7	2	63	54	37	36	8	8
Ève Bélisle (TMR/Etchemin)	6	3	63	45	39	34	9	14
Marie-Christine Cantin (Etchemin)	6	3	64	30	40	29	6	17
Julie Hamel (Chicoutimi)	5	4	66	55	43	38	5	10
Joëlle Belley (Glenmore)	3	6	49	60	33	39	4	11
Hélène Pelchat (Victoria)	2	7	43	67	29	39	6	7
Siân Canavan (Royal Montreal/Montreal West)	1	8	36	82	27	43	3	4
Laura Thomas (Glenmore)	1	8	40	76	32	40	1	6

== Results ==
=== Draw 1 ===
January 31, 8:15 AM

Sheet A	1	2	3	4	5	6	7	8	9	10	Final
Belley	0	0	0	0	1	0	2	0	0	X	3
Bélisle	0	0	2	1	0	3	0	2	0	X	8

Sheet B	1	2	3	4	5	6	7	8	9	10	Final
Thomas	0	1	0	1	0	1	0	1	0	X	4
Hamel	3	0	1	0	1	0	2	0	1	X	8

Sheet C	1	2	3	4	5	6	7	8	9	10	Final
Larouche	3	3	2	2	0	3	0	3	X	X	16
Canavan	0	0	0	0	2	0	2	0	X	X	4

Sheet D	1	2	3	4	5	6	7	8	9	10	Final
Osborne	0	0	0	2	0	2	2	0	0	X	6
Cantin	0	0	1	0	1	0	0	2	1	X	5

Sheet E	1	2	3	4	5	6	7	8	9	10	Final
Pelchat	0	0	0	0	2	0	3	1	0	X	6
Mastine	0	1	1	1	0	5	0	0	2	X	10

=== Draw 2 ===
January 31, 3:45 PM

Sheet A	1	2	3	4	5	6	7	8	9	10	Final
Mastine	0	1	0	2	0	1	2	0	0	1	7
Canavan	0	0	1	0	1	0	0	2	1	0	5

Sheet B	1	2	3	4	5	6	7	8	9	10	Final
Pelchat	0	0	0	0	2	0	1	0	0	X	3
Bélisle	0	0	0	1	0	2	0	2	1	X	6

Sheet C	1	2	3	4	5	6	7	8	9	10	Final
Belley	0	1	0	0	0	0	2	0	0	X	3
Cantin	1	0	1	1	1	1	0	1	3	X	9

Sheet D	1	2	3	4	5	6	7	8	9	10	Final
Larouche	0	4	0	4	3	0	2	X	X	X	13
Thomas	1	0	2	0	0	2	0	X	X	X	5

Sheet E	1	2	3	4	5	6	7	8	9	10	Final
Osborne	0	2	0	0	0	0	0	1	0	X	3
Hamel	0	0	2	1	1	1	1	0	2	X	8

=== Draw 3 ===
February 1, 8:15 AM

Sheet A	1	2	3	4	5	6	7	8	9	10	Final
Bélisle	4	1	0	1	4	X	X	X	X	X	10
Cantin	0	0	3	0	0	X	X	X	X	X	3

Sheet B	1	2	3	4	5	6	7	8	9	10	Final
Osborne	0	1	3	5	0	1	X	X	X	X	10
Thomas	1	0	0	0	1	0	X	X	X	X	2

Sheet C	1	2	3	4	5	6	7	8	9	10	Final
Canavan	0	1	0	0	0	X	X	X	X	X	1
Belley	3	0	3	4	2	X	X	X	X	X	12

Sheet D	1	2	3	4	5	6	7	8	9	10	Final
Hamel	0	1	0	0	2	0	1	0	1	0	5
Mastine	1	0	1	2	0	0	0	1	0	1	6

Sheet E	1	2	3	4	5	6	7	8	9	10	Final
Larouche	3	1	0	0	3	0	2	X	X	X	9
Pelchat	0	0	1	1	0	1	0	X	X	X	3

=== Draw 4 ===
February 1, 3:45 PM

Sheet A	1	2	3	4	5	6	7	8	9	10	Final
Larouche	0	1	0	0	4	2	0	0	X	X	7
Hamel	0	0	0	1	0	0	0	1	X	X	2

Sheet B	1	2	3	4	5	6	7	8	9	10	Final
Mastine	2	0	0	2	0	1	2	1	0	X	8
Belley	0	1	1	0	2	0	0	0	1	X	5

Sheet C	1	2	3	4	5	6	7	8	9	10	Final
Thomas	0	1	0	2	0	2	1	0	0	X	6
Bélisle	2	0	2	0	2	0	0	1	3	X	10

Sheet D	1	2	3	4	5	6	7	8	9	10	Final
Cantin	0	2	3	1	5	X	X	X	X	X	11
Pelchat	1	0	0	0	0	X	X	X	X	X	1

Sheet E	1	2	3	4	5	6	7	8	9	10	Final
Canavan	0	0	2	0	0	1	0	X	X	X	3
Osborne	1	5	0	1	1	0	3	X	X	X	11

=== Draw 5 ===
February 2, 12:00 PM

Sheet A	1	2	3	4	5	6	7	8	9	10	Final
Cantin	0	0	1	1	0	1	0	3	0	X	6
Mastine	0	3	0	0	1	0	2	0	4	X	10

Sheet B	1	2	3	4	5	6	7	8	9	10	Final
Larouche	0	2	1	0	0	0	1	0	2	0	6
Osborne	1	0	0	2	2	1	0	1	0	1	8

Sheet C	1	2	3	4	5	6	7	8	9	10	Final
Pelchat	0	1	0	1	0	2	0	2	0	X	6
Hamel	2	0	2	0	3	0	1	0	4	X	12

Sheet D	1	2	3	4	5	6	7	8	9	10	Final
Canavan	2	0	1	0	1	0	0	0	1	X	5
Bélisle	0	1	0	1	0	3	1	1	0	X	7

Sheet E	1	2	3	4	5	6	7	8	9	10	Final
Thomas	0	0	0	1	0	1	0	0	X	X	2
Belley	1	1	1	0	2	0	1	2	X	X	8

=== Draw 6 ===
February 2, 7:30 PM

Sheet A	1	2	3	4	5	6	7	8	9	10	Final
Canavan	1	2	0	0	1	0	0	2	0	X	6
Thomas	0	0	0	1	0	1	1	0	2	X	5

Sheet B	1	2	3	4	5	6	7	8	9	10	Final
Belley	0	1	0	0	0	1	1	0	0	X	3
Pelchat	1	0	2	1	0	0	0	1	3	X	8

Sheet C	1	2	3	4	5	6	7	8	9	10	Final
Bélisle	0	0	0	1	1	1	0	1	1	0	5
Osborne	1	0	1	0	0	0	1	0	0	1	4

Sheet D	1	2	3	4	5	6	7	8	9	10	Final
Mastine	1	0	0	0	1	0	0	0	X	X	2
Larouche	0	2	1	3	0	1	0	2	X	X	9

Sheet E	1	2	3	4	5	6	7	8	9	10	Final
Hamel	0	3	0	0	2	0	1	0	0	X	6
Cantin	1	0	1	1	0	4	0	1	1	X	9

=== Draw 7 ===
February 3, 12:00 PM

Sheet A	1	2	3	4	5	6	7	8	9	10	Final
Thomas	1	1	0	1	0	1	0	1	2	0	7
Pelchat	0	0	1	0	1	0	2	0	0	1	5

Sheet B	1	2	3	4	5	6	7	8	9	10	Final
Hamel	3	0	1	2	0	1	0	0	2	X	9
Canavan	0	1	0	0	2	0	2	1	0	X	6

Sheet C	1	2	3	4	5	6	7	8	9	10	Final
Cantin	1	0	0	0	1	0	3	0	1	2	8
Larouche	0	2	0	1	0	1	0	1	0	0	5

Sheet D	1	2	3	4	5	6	7	8	9	10	Final
Belley	0	1	0	0	2	1	2	0	1	0	7
Osborne	2	0	3	1	0	0	0	1	0	1	8

Sheet E	1	2	3	4	5	6	7	8	9	10	Final
Mastine	0	0	2	0	2	0	1	1	1	0	7
Bélisle	0	1	0	2	0	1	0	0	0	1	5

=== Draw 8 ===
February 3, 7:30 PM

Sheet A	1	2	3	4	5	6	7	8	9	10	11	Final
Hamel	1	0	2	0	1	1	0	0	1	0	0	6
Belley	0	2	0	1	0	0	1	1	0	1	1	7

Sheet B	1	2	3	4	5	6	7	8	9	10	Final
Bélisle	0	0	0	2	0	1	0	0	1	1	5
Larouche	0	1	1	0	1	0	1	2	0	0	6

Sheet C	1	2	3	4	5	6	7	8	9	10	Final
Osborne	0	0	2	0	3	0	1	1	2	X	9
Mastine	0	0	0	1	0	2	0	0	0	X	3

Sheet D	1	2	3	4	5	6	7	8	9	10	Final
Pelchat	0	4	2	1	0	1	X	X	X	X	8
Canavan	1	0	0	0	1	0	X	X	X	X	2

Sheet E	1	2	3	4	5	6	7	8	9	10	Final
Cantin	0	0	1	0	0	0	2	2	1	0	6
Thomas	1	1	0	0	1	1	0	0	0	1	5

=== Draw 9 ===
February 4, 8:15 AM

Sheet A	1	2	3	4	5	6	7	8	9	10	Final
Pelchat	0	0	0	1	1	0	0	1	0	0	3
Osborne	1	1	0	0	0	1	1	0	1	2	7

Sheet B	1	2	3	4	5	6	7	8	9	10	Final
Canavan	0	0	0	2	0	1	0	0	1	X	4
Cantin	2	0	2	0	1	0	1	1	0	X	7

Sheet C	1	2	3	4	5	6	7	8	9	10	Final
Mastine	0	3	0	1	0	3	3	X	X	X	10
Thomas	2	0	1	0	1	0	0	X	X	X	4

Sheet D	1	2	3	4	5	6	7	8	9	10	11	Final
Bélisle	0	0	0	1	0	2	0	0	2	2	0	7
Hamel	1	1	1	0	1	0	2	1	0	0	1	8

Sheet E	1	2	3	4	5	6	7	8	9	10	Final
Belley	0	0	0	0	1	0	X	X	X	X	1
Larouche	2	1	2	3	0	2	X	X	X	X	10

=== Tie Breaker ===
February 4, 3:45 PM

Sheet C	1	2	3	4	5	6	7	8	9	10	Final
Bélisle	0	1	0	1	0	3	2	X	X	X	7
Cantin	0	0	1	0	3	0	0	X	X	X	4

== Playoffs ==
Page playoff system
1	Chantal Osborne	4
2	M-F Larouche	6
3	Kim Mastine	6
4	Ève Bélisle	7

Semifinal
1	Chantal Osborne	7
4	Ève Bélisle	3

Final
2	M-F Larouche	8
1	Chantal Osborne	7

=== 1 vs. 2 ===
February 5, 2:00 PM

Sheet B	1	2	3	4	5	6	7	8	9	10	Final
Osborne	0	0	1	0	0	1	1	0	1	0	4
Larouche	0	0	0	1	1	0	0	2	0	2	6

=== 3 vs. 4 ===
February 5, 2:00 PM

Team	1	2	3	4	5	6	7	8	9	10	11	Final
Mastine	0	1	0	0	1	0	2	1	0	1	0	6
Bélisle	0	0	1	1	0	3	0	0	1	0	1	7

=== Semifinal ===
February 5, 7:00 PM

Sheet A	1	2	3	4	5	6	7	8	9	10	Final
Osborne	0	0	2	0	2	0	0	2	1	X	7
Bélisle	0	0	0	1	0	1	1	0	0	X	3

=== Final ===
February 6, 12:00 PM

Sheet B	1	2	3	4	5	6	7	8	9	10	Final
Larouche	0	2	0	1	0	4	0	0	0	1	8
Osborne	1	0	2	0	1	0	1	1	1	0	7
