= 2017 Quebec Scotties Tournament of Hearts =

- Host city: Lévis, Quebec
- Arena: Aréna de Lévis
- Dates: January 9–15, 2017
- Winner: Ève Bélisle
- Curling club: Glenmore CC, Dollard-des-Ormeaux & TMR CC, Mount Royal
- Skip: Ève Bélisle
- Third: Lauren Mann
- Second: Trish Hill
- Lead: Brittany O'Rourke
- Finalist: Marie-France Larouche

The 2017 Quebec Scotties Tournament of Hearts, the provincial women's curling championship of Quebec, was held from January 9 to 15 at the Aréna de Lévis in Lévis, Quebec. The winning Ève Bélisle team represented Quebec at the 2017 Scotties Tournament of Hearts. The event was held in conjunction with the 2017 Quebec Men's Provincial Curling Championship.

The defending champion Marie-France Larouche rink were playing on home-ice in Lévis, but would lose in the final to Montreal's Ève Bélisle. It was Bélisle's first trip to the provincial championships since 2010. Bélisle would defeat Larouche 7-4 in the final, having scored three in the second end and two in the fifth along the way.

== Teams ==
The teams are listed as follows:

Skip	Third	Second	Lead	Alternate	Club(s)
Ève Bélisle	Lauren Mann	Trish Hill	Brittany O'Rourke	Pamela Nugent	Glenmore / TMR
Marie-France Larouche	Brenda Nicholls	Annie Lemay	Julie Rainville	Amélie Blais	Etchemin
Camille Lapierre	Alanna Routledge	Vicky Tremblay	Jill Routledge		Glenmore
Sophie Morissette	Dominique Ricard	Émilie Desjardins	Véronique Bouchard		Laviolette / Glenmore / Chicoutimi
Isabelle Néron	Noémie Verreault	Marie-Pier Côté	Laurie Verreault		Chicoutimi / Trois-Rivières / Riverbend
Hélène Pelchat	Gaétane Tremblay	Laurie Lavoie	Sylvie Goulet	Sylvie Chiasson	Valleyfield
Roxane Perron	Lisa Davies	Miriam Perron	Anik Brascoup	Marie-Josée Fortier	Victoria / Laviolette / Glenmore

== Standings ==
Key
Teams to Playoffs

Skip	W	L
Bélisle	6	0
Larouche	5	1
Perron	3	3
Morissette	2	4
Pelchat	2	4
Néron	2	4
Lapierre	1	5

== Scores ==
Draw 3

- Perron 7-2 Néron
- Bélisle 8-3 Lapierre
- Larouche 7-2 Morissette

Draw 5

- Perron 7-4 Lapierre

Draw 6

- Bélisle 8-1 Morissette
- Larouche 8-4 Pelchat

Draw 7

- Néron 9-7 Lapierre

Draw 8

- Bélisle 9-5 Pelchat
- Perron 9-5 Morissette

Draw 9

- Morissette 9-8 Lapierre
- Néron 9-3 Pelchat

Draw 10

- Larouche 5-3 Perron

Draw 11

- Lapierre 11-2 Pelchat

Draw 12

- Bélisle 4-1 Perron
- Larouche 6-5 Néron

Draw 13

- Pelchat 9-3 Morissette
- Bélisle 11-9 Néron

Draw 14

- Larouche 11-4 Lapierre

Draw 16

- Morissette 6-4 Néron
- Bélisle 4-3 Larouche
- Pelchat 8-6 Perron

== Playoffs ==
Semifinal			Final
			1	Ève Bélisle	7
2	Marie-France Larouche	5	2	Marie-France Larouche	4
3	Roxane Perron	4

=== Semifinal ===
Saturday, January 14, 2:30 pm

Team	1	2	3	4	5	6	7	8	9	10	Final
Marie-France Larouche 🔨	0	0	0	1	0	2	0	1	0	1	5
Roxane Perron	0	1	0	0	1	0	0	0	2	0	4

=== Final ===
Sunday, January 15, 12:00 pm

Sheet C	1	2	3	4	5	6	7	8	9	10	Final
Ève Bélisle 🔨	0	3	0	0	2	0	1	0	1	X	7
Marie-France Larouche	0	0	1	0	0	1	0	2	0	X	4

2017 Quebec Scotties Tournament of Hearts

Ève Bélisle
3rd Quebec Provincial Championship title
