= 2009 Canada Cup of Curling =

Curling tournament in Saskatchewan

2009 Canada Cup
- Host city: Yorkton, Saskatchewan
- Arena: Farrell Agencies Arena
- Dates: March 18-22
- Attendance: 27,188
- Men's winner: (Alberta) Kevin Martin
- Curling club: Saville Sports Centre, Edmonton
- Skip: Kevin Martin
- Third: John Morris
- Second: Marc Kennedy
- Lead: Ben Hebert
- Finalist: (Alberta) Randy Ferbey
- Women's winner: (Alberta) Shannon Kleibrink
- Curling club: Calgary Winter Club, Calgary
- Skip: Shannon Kleibrink
- Third: Amy Nixon
- Second: Bronwen Webster
- Lead: Chelsey Bell
- Finalist: (Quebec) Marie-France Larouche

The 2009 Canada Cup of Curling was held March 18-22 at the Farrell Agencies Arena in Yorkton, Saskatchewan.

== Men's ==
=== Teams ===
- (Alberta) Kevin Koe (Defending champion)
- (Alberta) Kevin Martin (2008 Brier Champion)
- (Ontario) ~~Glenn Howard (2008 Player's Championship champion)~~ (dropped out)
- (British Columbia) ~~Bob Ursel (Diversified Qualifier)~~ (dropped out)
- (New Brunswick) Russ Howard (Diversified Qualifier)
- (Manitoba) Mike McEwen (Diversified Qualifier)
- (Alberta) Randy Ferbey (3rd, CCA rankings as of Dec. 16, 2008)
- (Newfoundland and Labrador) Brad Gushue (4th, CCA rankings as of Dec. 16, 2008)
- (Ontario) Wayne Middaugh (5th, CCA rankings as of Dec. 16, 2008)
- (Manitoba) Kerry Burtnyk (6th, CCA rankings as of Dec. 16, 2008)
- (Manitoba) Jeff Stoughton (invited as replacement)
- (Alberta) Ted Appelman (invited as replacement)

| Skip | Third | Second | Lead | Locale |
|---|---|---|---|---|
| Ted Appelman | Tom Appelman | Brandon Klassen | Brendan Melnyk | (Alberta) Saville Sports Centre, Edmonton |
| Kerry Burtnyk | Don Walchuk | Richard Daneault | Garth Smith | (Manitoba) Assiniboine Memorial Curling Club, Winnipeg |
| David Nedohin | Randy Ferbey (skip) | Scott Pfeifer | Marcel Rocque | (Alberta) Saville Sports Centre, Edmonton |
| Brad Gushue | Mark Nichols | Ryan Fry | Jamie Korab | (Newfoundland and Labrador) Bally Haly Golf & Curling Club St. John's |
| Russ Howard | James Grattan | Jason Vaughan | Steven Howard | (New Brunswick) Curling Beauséjour, Moncton & Gage Golf and Curling Club, Oromocto |
| Blake MacDonald | Kevin Koe (skip) | Carter Rycroft | Nolan Thiessen | (Alberta) Saville Sports Centre, Edmonton |
| Kevin Martin | John Morris | Marc Kennedy | Ben Hebert | (Alberta) Saville Sports Centre, Edmonton |
| Mike McEwen | B. J. Neufeld | Matt Wozniak | Denni Neufeld | (Manitoba) Assiniboine Memorial Curling Club, Winnipeg |
| Wayne Middaugh | Jon Mead | John Epping | Scott Bailey | (Ontario) St. George's Golf & Country Club, Etobicoke, Toronto |
| Jeff Stoughton | Kevin Park | Rob Fowler | Steve Gould | (Manitoba) Charleswood Curling Club, Winnipeg |

=== Round-robin standings ===
Key
| Teams to Playoffs |

| Section A | W | L |
|---|---|---|
| (Alberta) Kevin Martin | 4 | 1 |
| (Ontario) Wayne Middaugh | 3 | 2 |
| (Newfoundland and Labrador) Brad Gushue | 2 | 3 |
| (Manitoba) Mike McEwen | 2 | 3 |
| (New Brunswick) Russ Howard | 1 | 4 |

| Section B | W | L |
|---|---|---|
| (Alberta) Randy Ferbey | 4 | 1 |
| (Manitoba) Jeff Stoughton | 4 | 1 |
| (Alberta) Kevin Koe | 3 | 2 |
| (Alberta) Ted Appelman | 1 | 4 |
| (Manitoba) Kerry Burtnyk | 1 | 4 |

=== Playoffs ===
Page playoff system
A1 | (Alberta) Kevin Martin | 2
B1 | (Alberta) Randy Ferbey | 6
A2 | (Ontario) Wayne Middaugh | 3
B2 | (Manitoba) Jeff Stoughton | 5

Semifinal
A1 | (Alberta) Kevin Martin | 8
B2 | (Manitoba) Jeff Stoughton | 3

Final
B1 | (Alberta) Randy Ferbey | 5
A1 | (Alberta) Kevin Martin | 8

== Women's ==
=== Teams ===
- (Saskatchewan) Stefanie Lawton (Defending champion)
- (Manitoba) ~~Jennifer Jones (2008 Scotties champion)~~ (dropped out)
- (Saskatchewan) Amber Holland (2008 Player's Championship champion)
- (Quebec) Marie-France Larouche (JSI Qualifier)
- (Nova Scotia) Mary-Anne Arsenault (JSI Qualifier)
- (Ontario) Sherry Middaugh (JSI Qualifier)
- (Alberta) Shannon Kleibrink (1st, CCA rankings as of Dec. 16, 2008)
- (Alberta) Cheryl Bernard (2nd, CCA rankings as of Dec. 16, 2008)
- (British Columbia) Kelly Scott (7th, CCA rankings as of Dec. 16, 2008)
- (Alberta) Cathy King (8th, CCA rankings as of Dec. 16, 2008)
- (Saskatchewan) Michelle Englot (invited as replacement)

| Skip | Third | Second | Lead | Locale |
|---|---|---|---|---|
| Mary-Anne Arsenault | Kay Zinck | Laine Peters | Theresa Breen | (Nova Scotia) Mayflower Curling Club, Halifax |
| Cheryl Bernard | Susan O'Connor | Carolyn Darbyshire | Cori Bartel | (Alberta) Calgary Curling Club & Calgary Winter Club, Calgary |
| Michelle Englot | Deanna Doig | Roberta Materi | Cindy Simmons | (Saskatchewan) Tartan Curling Club, Regina |
| Amber Holland | Kim Schneider | Tammy Schneider | Heather Seeley | (Saskatchewan) Kronau Curling Club, Kronau |
| Cathy King | Kaitlyn Lawes | Raylene Rocque | Tracy Bush | (Alberta) Saville Sports Centre, Edmonton |
| Shannon Kleibrink | Amy Nixon | Bronwen Webster | Chelsey Bell | (Alberta) Calgary Winter Club, Calgary |
| Marie-France Larouche | Nancy Bélanger | Annie Lemay | Joëlle Sabourin | (Quebec) Club de curling Saint-Etchemin, Saint-Romuald |
| Stefanie Lawton | Marliese Kasner | Sherri Singler | Lana Vey | (Saskatchewan) CN Curling Club, Saskatoon |
| Sherry Middaugh | Kirsten Wall | Kim Moore | Andra Harmark | (Ontario) Coldwater & District Curling Club, Coldwater |
| Kelly Scott | Jeanna Schraeder | Sasha Carter | Renee Simons | (British Columbia) Kelowna Curling Club, Kelowna |

=== Standings ===
Key
| Teams to Playoffs |
| Teams to Tiebreaker |

| Section A | W | L |
|---|---|---|
| (Alberta) Shannon Kleibrink | 4 | 1 |
| (Saskatchewan) Michelle Englot | 3 | 2 |
| (Nova Scotia) Mary-Anne Arsenault | 3 | 2 |
| (British Columbia) Kelly Scott | 2 | 3 |
| (Ontario) Sherry Middaugh | 0 | 5 |

| Section B | W | L |
|---|---|---|
| (Quebec) Marie-France Larouche | 4 | 1 |
| (Alberta) Cheryl Bernard | 3 | 2 |
| (Saskatchewan) Amber Holland | 2 | 3 |
| (Alberta) Cathy King | 2 | 3 |
| (Saskatchewan) Stefanie Lawton | 2 | 3 |

=== Tie-breaker ===
- Englot 7-6 Arsenault

=== Playoffs ===
Page playoff system
A1 | (Alberta) Shannon Kleibrink | 6
B1 | (Quebec) Marie-France Larouche | 4
A2 | (Saskatchewan) Michelle Englot | 5
B2 | (Alberta) Cheryl Bernard | 8

Semifinal
B1 | (Quebec) Marie-France Larouche | 7
B2 | (Alberta) Cheryl Bernard | 6

Final
A1 | (Alberta) Shannon Kleibrink | 6
B1 | (Quebec) Marie-France Larouche | 4

== Qualifiers ==
The four qualifying positions in both the men's and women's events were held December 11-15, 2008. The men's qualifier was held at the Saville Sports Centre in Edmonton while the women's qualifier was held at the Ottawa Curling Club and Rideau Curling Club in Ottawa.

=== Diversified Transportation Canada Cup Qualifier (Men) ===
Quarter-Finals
(British Columbia) | Bob Ursel | 5
(British Columbia) | Sean Geall | 2
(New Brunswick) | Russ Howard | 9
(Ontario) | Wayne Middaugh | 4
(Manitoba) | Kerry Burtnyk | 7
(Manitoba) | Mike McEwen | 8
(Alberta) | Kevin Martin | 9
(Alberta) | Kevin Koe | 2

Semi-Finals
(British Columbia) | Bob Ursel | 7
(New Brunswick) | Russ Howard | 6
(Manitoba) | Mike McEwen | 5
(Alberta) | Kevin Martin | 7

Final
(British Columbia) | Bob Ursel | 8
(Alberta) | Kevin Martin | 6

Teams:

- (Alberta) Mike Anderson
- (Alberta) Ted Appelman
- (Ontario) Greg Balsdon
- (Manitoba) David Bohn
- (Manitoba) Kerry Burtnyk
- (Manitoba) Reid Carruthers
- (Ontario) Trevor Clifford
- (Yukon) Chad Cowan
- (Quebec) Robert Desjardins
- (Quebec) Simon Dupuis
- (Manitoba) Randy Dutiaume
- (Alberta) Jeff Erickson
- (Alberta) Randy Ferbey
- (Quebec) Martin Ferland
- (British Columbia) Sean Geall
- (Newfoundland and Labrador) Brad Gushue
- (Saskatchewan) Brad Heidt
- (New Brunswick) Russ Howard
- (Ontario) Brad Jacobs
- (Saskatchewan) Joel Jordison
- (Alberta) Jamie King
- (Northwest Territories) Jamie Koe
- (Alberta) Kevin Koe
- (New Brunswick) Marc Lecocq
- (Alberta) Rob Maksymetz
- (Alberta) Kevin Martin
- (Manitoba) Mike McEwen
- (Alberta) Rick McKague
- (Saskatchewan) Darrell McKee
- (Ontario) Wayne Middaugh
- (British Columbia) Greg Monkman
- (Alberta) Darren Moulding
- (Manitoba) Richard Muntain
- (Alberta) Shane Park
- (Manitoba) Daley Peters
- (Alberta) Dan Petryk
- (Alberta) Steve Petryk
- (Alberta) Dean Ross
- (Alberta) Chris Schille
- (Saskatchewan) Pat Simmons
- (Manitoba) Jeff Stoughton
- (Alberta) Dale Swyripa
- (British Columbia) Bob Ursel
- (Alberta) Wade White

=== John Shea Insurance Canada Cup Qualifier (Women) ===
Quarter-Finals
(Manitoba) | Jennifer Jones | 5
(Quebec) | Marie-France Larouche | 8
(Nova Scotia) | Mary-Anne Arsenault | 8
(Saskatchewan) | Sherry Anderson | 1
(Alberta) | Shannon Kleibrink | 3
(Saskatchewan) | Amber Holland | 9
(Ontario) | Sherry Middaugh | 10
(Alberta) | Cathy King | 7

Semi-Finals
(Quebec) | Marie-France Larouche | 9
(Nova Scotia) | Mary-Anne Arsenault | 4
(Saskatchewan) | Amber Holland | 7
(Ontario) | Sherry Middaugh | 5

Final
(Quebec) | Marie-France Larouche | 6
(Saskatchewan) | Amber Holland | 4

Teams:

- (Saskatchewan) Sherry Anderson
- (Nova Scotia) Mary-Anne Arsenault
- (Quebec) Ève Bélisle
- (Alberta) Cheryl Bernard
- (Prince Edward Island) Suzanne Birt
- (Manitoba) Maureen Bonar
- (Ontario) Suzanne Boudreault
- (Ontario) Chrissy Cadorin
- (Manitoba) Chelsea Carey
- (Saskatchewan) Chantelle Eberle
- (Saskatchewan) Michelle Englot
- (Manitoba) Kerri Flett
- (Ontario) Alison Goring
- (Ontario) Jenn Hanna
- (Ontario) Julie Hastings
- (Saskatchewan) Amber Holland
- (Ontario) Rachel Homan
- (Ontario) Tracy Horgan
- (Manitoba) Kristie Jenion
- (Manitoba) Jennifer Jones
- (New Brunswick) Andrea Kelly
- (Alberta) Cathy King
- (Alberta) Shannon Kleibrink
- (Quebec) Marie-France Larouche
- (Ontario) Carrie Lindner
- (Ontario) Krista McCarville
- (Saskatchewan) Jolene McIvor
- (Ontario) Sherry Middaugh
- (Alberta) Kristie Moore
- (Nova Scotia) Jill Mouzar
- (Newfoundland and Labrador) Shelley Nichols
- (Ontario) Hollie Nicol
- (Ontario) Brit O'Neill
- (Quebec) Chantal Osborne
- (Manitoba) Karen Porritt
- (Alberta) Heather Rankin
- (Ontario) Julie Reddick
- (Quebec) Allison Ross
- (British Columbia) Kelly Scott
- (Alberta) Renée Sonnenberg
- (Manitoba) Barb Spencer
- (Saskatchewan) Cindy Street
- (Newfoundland and Labrador) Heather Strong
- (Alberta) Crystal Webster
