= Sobeys Slam =

Former World Curling Tour event

The Sobeys Slam was a former Grand Slam event of the Women's World Curling Tour. It was held annually in November in New Glasgow, Nova Scotia.

The event began in 1998 as the Sobeys Curling Classic. It was added as a Grand Slam event for the 2007-08 curling season, and was renamed the "Sobeys Slam". The event was not held for the 2009-10 curling season; however, it was brought back once more for the 2010-11 curling season, before coming to an end. The total purse of the event was $60,000.

== Winners ==
Year	Winning team	Runner up team	Purse
2010	Jennifer Jones, Kaitlyn Lawes, Jill Officer, Dawn Askin	Chelsea Carey, Kristy Jenion, Kristen Foster, Lindsay Titheridge	$60,000
2009	Not held		
2008	Marie-France Larouche, Nancy Bélanger, Annie Lemay, Joëlle Sabourin	Stefanie Lawton, Marliese Kasner, Sherri Singler, Lana Vey	$60,000
2007	Sherry Middaugh, Kirsten Wall, Kim Moore, Andra Harmark	Marie-France Larouche, Nancy Bélanger, Annie Lemay, Joëlle Sabourin	$54,000

== Sobeys Curling Classic Winners ==
Year	Winning Skip
2006	Nancy McConnery
2005	Heather Strong
2004	Kay Zinck
2003	Jocelyn Palmer
2002	Kathy O'Rourke
2001	Suzanne Gaudet
2000	Tammi Lowther
1999	Colleen Jones
1998	Mary Mattatall

== See also ==
- Sobey family
