= Quebec Women's Curling Championship =

- Established: 1957
- 2026 host city: Rimouski, Quebec
- 2026 arena: Complexe Sportif Desjardins
- 2026 champion: Jolianne Fortin

Current edition
- 2026 Quebec Women's Curling Championship

The Quebec Women's Curling Championship (French: Championnat Provincial féminin), formerly the Quebec Scotties Tournament of Hearts is the Quebec provincial women's curling tournament. The tournament is run by Curling Québec, the provincial curling association. The winning team represents Quebec at the Scotties Tournament of Hearts.

== Past winners ==
(National champions in bold)

Year	Skip
2026	Jolianne Fortin
2025	Laurie St-Georges
2024	Laurie St-Georges
2023	Laurie St-Georges
2022	Cancelled due to the COVID-19 pandemic in Quebec. Team St-Georges (Laurie St-Georges, Hailey Armstrong, Emily Riley, Cynthia St-Georges) represented Quebec at Scotties.
2021	Cancelled due to the COVID-19 pandemic in Quebec. Team St-Georges (Laurie St-Georges, Hailey Armstrong, Emily Riley, Cynthia St-Georges) represented Quebec at Scotties.
2020	Noémie Verreault
2019	Gabrielle Lavoie
2018	Émilia Gagné
2017	Ève Bélisle
2016	Marie-France Larouche
2015	Lauren Mann
2014	Allison Ross
2013	Allison Ross
2012	Marie-France Larouche
2011	Marie-France Larouche
2010	Ève Bélisle
2009	Marie-France Larouche
2008	Marie-France Larouche
2007	Chantal Osborne
2006	Ève Bélisle
2005	Brenda Nicholls
2004	Marie-France Larouche
2003	Nathalie Gagnon
2002	Nathalie Gagnon
2001	Marie-France Larouche
2000	Janique Berthelot
1999	Janique Berthelot
1998	Marie-Claude Carlos
1997	Chantal Osborne
1996	Stéphanie Marchand
1995	Guylaine Crispo
1994	Agnès Charette
1993	Agnès Charette
1992	Agnès Charette
1991	Francine Poisson
1990	Francine Poisson
1989	Agnès Charette
1988	Francine Poisson
1987	Hélène Tousignant
1986	Helen Brussières
1985	Nicole Filion
1984	Agnès Charette
1983	Agnès Charette
1982	Hélène Tousignant
1981	Micheline Tremblay
1980	Dorothy Crowe
1979	Lorraine Bowes
1978	Carole Topp
1977	Carole Topp
1976	Joan Gregory
1975	**Lee Tobin**
1974	Frida Payson
1973	Lee Tobin
1972	Lee Tobin
1971	Nicole Janelle
1970	Lee Tobin
1969	Leona MacKimmie
1968	Peggy Bradshaw
1967	Shirley Bradford
1966	Nicole Janelle
1965	Solange Larouche
1964	Anne Phillips
1963	Inez Kerr
1962	Anne Phillips
1961	Helena Ellvett
1960	Ruth Smith
1957	Rita Proulx
