= 2018 Quebec Scotties Tournament of Hearts =

- Host city: Saint-Romuald, Quebec
- Arena: Club de curling Etchemin
- Dates: January 9–14, 2018
- Winner: Team Gagné
- Curling club: CC Riverbend, Alma
- Skip: Émilia Gagné
- Third: Mélina Perron
- Second: Marie-Pier Harvey
- Lead: Chloé Arnaud
- Coach: Joël Gagné
- Finalist: Ève Bélisle

The 2018 Quebec Scotties Tournament of Hearts, the provincial women's curling championship of Quebec, was held from January 9 to 14 at the Club de curling Etchemin in Saint-Romuald, Quebec. The winning Émilia Gagné team represented Quebec at the 2018 Scotties Tournament of Hearts.

== Teams ==
The teams are listed as follows:

Skip	Third	Second	Lead	Alternate	Club(s)
Ève Bélisle	Lauren Mann	Patricia Hill	Brittany O'Rourke		Glenmore / TMR
Émilia Gagné	Mélina Perron	Marie-Pier Harvey	Chloé Arnaud		Riverbend
Dominique Jean	Claudie Gobeil-Tremblay	Isabelle Thiboutot	Laura Girard-Côté	Julie Fortin	Etchemin / Montreal West
Marie-France Larouche	Brenda Nicholls	Nancy Bélanger	Julie Rainville	Valérie Grenier	Etchemin
Gabrielle Lavoie	Patricia Boudreault	Anna Munroe	Julie Daigle		Victoria
Sophie Morissette	Dominique Ricard	Alison Davies	Kelly Tremblay		Laviolette / Glenmore / Nairn
Isabelle Néron	Noémie Verreault	Marie-Pier Côté	Émilie Desjardins		Chicoutimi / Trois-Rivières
Roxane Perron	Lisa Davies	Miriam Perron	Anik Brascoup		Etchemin / Glenmore / Trois-Rivières / Laviolette

== Standings ==
Final round-robin standings

Key
Teams to Playoffs

Skip	W	L
Ève Bélisle	6	1
Marie-France Larouche	6	1
Émilia Gagné	4	3
Roxane Perron	4	3
Sophie Morissette	3	4
Dominique Jean	2	5
Isabelle Néron	2	5
Gabrielle Lavoie	1	6

== Scores ==
=== Draw 1 ===
January 9, 8:00 pm

Sheet A	1	2	3	4	5	6	7	8	9	10	Final
Lavoie	0	1	0	0	0	1	1	0	1	0	4
Néron	0	0	2	0	0	0	0	3	0	1	6

Sheet B	1	2	3	4	5	6	7	8	9	10	Final
Gagné	0	0	0	1	0	1	0	0	2	X	4
Belisle	0	1	2	0	2	0	1	1	0	X	7

Sheet C	1	2	3	4	5	6	7	8	9	10	Final
Larouche	2	0	1	0	2	4	X	X	X	X	9
Morissette	0	1	0	1	0	0	X	X	X	X	2

Sheet D	1	2	3	4	5	6	7	8	9	10	Final
Perron	0	1	1	0	1	1	2	1	X	X	7
Jean	0	0	0	0	0	0	0	0	X	X	0

=== Draw 2 ===
January 10, 11:00 am

Sheet A	1	2	3	4	5	6	7	8	9	10	Final
Perron	0	1	0	1	0	2	0	0	0	0	4
Gagné	0	0	2	0	1	0	1	1	0	1	6

Sheet B	1	2	3	4	5	6	7	8	9	10	Final
Néron	0	1	0	0	2	0	1	0	2	0	6
Morissette	1	0	1	1	0	0	0	2	0	2	7

Sheet C	1	2	3	4	5	6	7	8	9	10	Final
Jean	0	0	3	0	2	0	0	1	0	X	6
Bélisle	1	0	0	3	0	3	1	0	2	X	10

Sheet D	1	2	3	4	5	6	7	8	9	10	Final
Lavoie	0	2	0	1	0	1	X	X	X	X	4
Larouche	3	0	3	0	3	0	X	X	X	X	9

=== Draw 3 ===
January 10, 4:00 pm

Sheet A	1	2	3	4	5	6	7	8	9	10	Final
Bélisle	2	0	0	3	2	0	X	X	X	X	7
Morissette	0	0	2	0	0	1	X	X	X	X	3

Sheet B	1	2	3	4	5	6	7	8	9	10	Final
Larouche	0	0	2	1	0	3	0	2	X	X	8
Jean	0	1	0	0	1	0	1	0	X	X	3

Sheet C	1	2	3	4	5	6	7	8	9	10	Final
Lavoie	0	2	0	1	0	2	0	1	0	X	6
Perron	2	0	1	0	1	0	4	0	1	X	9

Sheet D	1	2	3	4	5	6	7	8	9	10	Final
Gagné	0	1	0	2	2	0	2	X	X	X	7
Néron	0	0	0	0	0	2	0	X	X	X	2

=== Draw 4 ===
January 11, 1:00 pm

Sheet A	1	2	3	4	5	6	7	8	9	10	Final
Gagné	1	0	2	0	2	0	2	1	2	X	10
Jean	0	1	0	1	0	3	0	0	0	X	5

Sheet B	1	2	3	4	5	6	7	8	9	10	Final
Bélisle	0	0	1	2	0	2	0	0	0	X	5
Perron	0	1	0	0	3	0	0	2	1	X	7

Sheet C	1	2	3	4	5	6	7	8	9	10	Final
Néron	0	1	1	0	1	0	1	0	X	X	4
Larouche	3	0	0	1	0	3	0	2	X	X	9

Sheet D	1	2	3	4	5	6	7	8	9	10	Final
Morissette	1	2	1	0	0	3	1	0	2	X	10
Lavoie	0	0	0	2	2	0	0	2	0	X	6

=== Draw 5 ===
January 11, 7:00 pm

Sheet A	1	2	3	4	5	6	7	8	9	10	Final
Morissette	0	1	0	0	0	1	X	X	X	X	2
Perron	2	0	1	1	3	0	X	X	X	X	7

Sheet B	1	2	3	4	5	6	7	8	9	10	Final
Jean	0	1	0	1	0	2	1	0	3	1	9
Néron	2	0	1	0	4	0	0	1	0	0	8

Sheet C	1	2	3	4	5	6	7	8	9	10	Final
Bélisle	0	1	0	1	2	0	2	2	2	X	10
Lavoie	0	0	2	0	0	2	0	0	0	X	4

Sheet D	1	2	3	4	5	6	7	8	9	10	Final
Larouche	1	0	4	2	0	1	0	1	X	X	9
Gagné	0	2	0	0	1	0	1	0	X	X	4

=== Draw 6 ===
January 12, 1:00 pm

Sheet A	1	2	3	4	5	6	7	8	9	10	Final
Jean	0	0	2	0	0	1	0	2	2	0	7
Lavoie	1	0	0	1	2	0	2	0	0	2	8

Sheet B	1	2	3	4	5	6	7	8	9	10	Final
Perron	0	0	0	1	0	1	0	1	X	X	3
Larouche	2	0	2	0	1	0	2	0	X	X	7

Sheet C	1	2	3	4	5	6	7	8	9	10	Final
Morissette	2	1	1	0	1	2	0	0	0	0	7
Gagné	0	0	0	2	0	0	1	1	1	1	6

Sheet D	1	2	3	4	5	6	7	8	9	10	Final
Néron	1	0	0	2	0	0	1	0	2	X	6
Bélisle	0	0	2	0	1	4	0	1	0	X	8

=== Draw 7 ===
January 12, 7:00 pm

Sheet A	1	2	3	4	5	6	7	8	9	10	Final
Larouche	2	0	0	1	0	0	2	0	1	0	6
Bélisle	0	1	1	0	0	1	0	4	0	1	8

Sheet B	1	2	3	4	5	6	7	8	9	10	Final
Lavoie	1	0	0	1	0	1	0	1	0	X	4
Gagné	0	0	1	0	1	0	3	0	2	X	7

Sheet C	1	2	3	4	5	6	7	8	9	10	11	Final
Perron	0	1	0	2	0	0	0	3	1	1	0	8
Néron	1	0	1	0	1	1	4	0	0	0	1	9

Sheet D	1	2	3	4	5	6	7	8	9	10	Final
Jean	0	0	1	0	5	0	0	2	0	0	8
Morissette	0	0	0	2	0	1	1	0	2	1	7

=== Tiebreaker ===
Saturday, January 13, 14:30

Team	1	2	3	4	5	6	7	8	9	10	Final
Perron	1	1	0	2	0	0	0	0	X	X	4
Gagné	0	0	3	0	0	3	2	0	X	X	8

== Playoffs ==
Semifinal			Final
			1	Ève Bélisle	6
2	Marie-France Larouche	7	3	Émilia Gagné	7
3	Émilia Gagné	8

=== Semifinal ===
Saturday, January 13, 19:00

Team	1	2	3	4	5	6	7	8	9	10	Final
Marie-France Larouche	1	0	0	1	0	1	1	0	3	0	7
Émilia Gagné	0	1	2	0	1	0	0	2	0	2	8

=== Final ===
Sunday, January 14, 11:00

Team	1	2	3	4	5	6	7	8	9	10	11	Final
Ève Bélisle	0	2	0	2	0	0	0	1	1	0	0	6
Émilia Gagné	0	0	1	0	2	1	1	0	0	1	1	7

2018 Quebec Scotties Tournament of Hearts

Émilia Gagné
1st Quebec Provincial Championship title
