= John Shea Insurance Canada Cup Qualifier =

The John Shea Insurance Canada Cup Qualifier was an annual curling bonspiel held at the Ottawa and Rideau Curling Clubs in Ottawa, Ontario, Canada. In odd years, the event was a qualifier for the men's Canada Cup of Curling while in even years the event is the women's qualifier. It was held annually in December, and was part of the World Curling Tour.

The rotating format begun in 2006, when Ottawa hosted the JSI Women's Canada Cup Qualifier. The other qualifier was held annually at the Saville Centre in Edmonton, Alberta and was known as the Diversified Transportation Canada Cup Qualifier. In 2004, Ottawa hosted the Canada Cup East Qualifier for both sexes (the 2005 event was cancelled). Prior to this, the event had nothing to do with the Canada Cup, and was known as the Cowan Wright Beauchamp - The Championships (2001-2003) and the Welton Beauchamp Curling Classic (1992-2000) and the Labatt's Blue Light Cashspiel (1989-1991).

The purses for the event have often been quite high, and was at $100,000 at one point. The 2008 event gave away $65,200.

Mike Harris' victory in 1996 and Brad Gushue's victory in 2004 gave them berths to Canada's Olympic qualifying tournaments which they eventually won. Gushue would win Olympic Gold at the 2006 Winter Olympics, while Harris won silver at the 1998 Olympics.

The event last occurred in 2008. There was no Canada Cup in the 2009-10 curling season, cancelling the 2009 tournament. The Canada Cup returned in December 2010, the same time as the qualifiers used to be. To date, the event has not been replaced by another major tournament. The local qualifier for the 2010 Canada Cup of Curling was the Challenge Casino Lac Leamy, and there has not been local qualifiers since.

== Champions ==
Year	Winning men's skip	Winning women's skip
2008	-	(Quebec) Marie-France Larouche
2007	(Alberta) Kevin Koe	-
2006	-	(Manitoba) Jennifer Jones
2005	cancelled	
2004	(Newfoundland and Labrador) Brad Gushue	(Ontario) Jo-Ann Rizzo
2003	(Manitoba) Jeff Stoughton	(Quebec) Brenda Nicholls
2002	(Ontario) Glenn Howard	(Ontario) Janet McGhee
2001	(Ontario) Wayne Middaugh	(Sweden) Elisabet Gustafson
2000	(Ontario) Wayne Middaugh	(British Columbia) Sherry Fraser
1999	(Ontario) Mike Harris	(New Brunswick) Kathy Floyd
1998	(Manitoba) Mark Olson	(Quebec) Chantal Osborne
1997	(Ontario) Rich Moffatt	(Ontario) Alison Goring
1996	(Ontario) Mike Harris	(Saskatchewan) Sherry Scheirich
1995	(Ontario) Larry Pineau	(Ontario) Kathy Brown
1994	(Ontario) Dan Mustapic	(Ontario) Pam Leavitt
1993	(Ontario) Ed Werenich	(Ontario) Pam Leavitt
1992	(Ontario) Mike Harris	(Ontario) Anne Merklinger
1991	(Quebec) Ted Butler	(Manitoba) Karen Fallis
1990	(Quebec) Ted Butler	(Manitoba) Connie Laliberte
1989	(Saskatchewan) Eugene Hritzuk	(Ontario) Anne Merklinger
