= 1995 Canadian Junior Curling Championships =

The 1995 Canadian Junior Curling Championships were held February 4–12 at the Caledonian Curling Club in Regina, Saskatchewan.

For the women's event, prior to 1994, the winner of the Canadian Junior Curling Championships would go on to play in the following season's World Junior Curling Championships. However, the Canadian Curling Association (CCA) made a rule change where the winner of the Canadian Junior Curling Championships would advance to Worlds in the same season. As a result, Jennifer Jones did not get the opportunity to play in the 1995 World Junior Curling Championships after her victory in the 1994 Canadian Junior Curling Championships because of the rule change. Instead, Jones' 1994 championship team was given a berth as top seed directly into the semifinals, where she lost to former teammate Kelly MacKenzie.

== Men's ==
=== Teams ===
Province / Territory	Skip	Third	Second	Lead
Northwest Territories/Yukon	Jamie Koe	Mark Whitehead	Kevin Whitehead	Kevin Cymbalisty
Northern Ontario	Maurice Belisle	Kevin Campbell	Terry Dambrowitz	Nicholas Forest
Alberta	Cameron Dechant	Blake MacDonald	Wade Johnston	Jason Lesmeister
Manitoba	Chris Galbraith	Scott Cripps	Brent Barrett	Bryan Galbraith
New Brunswick	James Grattan	Kevin Boyle	Spencer Mawhinney	Jeff Lacey
Saskatchewan	Neil Cursons	Pat Simmons	Rob Nixon	Jamie Burrows
Nova Scotia	Peter Eddy	Rob Sifton	Jeffrey Ostien	Kris MacLeod
Newfoundland	Ryan Davis	Brett Reynolds	Brad Gushue	Colin Josephson
Quebec	Yanick Gaudreault	Jean-Sebastien Roy	Sebastien Bouchard	Joey Fraser
Ontario	Patrick Ferris	Chris Schell	Bryan Johnson	Paul Webster
Prince Edward Island	Mark Kinney	Andrew MacDougall	Erik Broderson	Chad MacMillan
British Columbia	Jim Cotter	Brendan Willis	Neal Dustin	Grant Olsen

=== Standings ===
Locale	Skip	W	L
New Brunswick	James Grattan	10	1
Manitoba	Chris Galbraith	8	3
Saskatchewan	Neil Cursons	8	3
British Columbia	Jim Cotter	7	4
Northern Ontario	Maurice Belisle	6	5
Alberta	Cameron Dechant	6	5
Ontario	Patrick Ferris	6	5
Quebec	Yanick Gaudreault	5	6
Prince Edward Island	Mark Kinney	4	7
Nova Scotia	Peter Eddy	3	8
Northwest Territories/Yukon	Jamie Koe	2	9
Newfoundland	Ryan Davis	1	10

=== Results ===
==== Draw 1 ====
Sheet B	1	2	3	4	5	6	7	8	9	10	Final
Quebec (Gaudreault) 🔨	0	0	0	1	0	1	2	0	2	X	6
Northwest Territories/Yukon (Koe)	1	0	1	0	1	0	0	1	0	X	4

Sheet D	1	2	3	4	5	6	7	8	9	10	Final
Northern Ontario (Belisle) 🔨	0	1	1	2	0	0	3	0	2	X	9
Newfoundland (Davis)	0	0	0	0	3	0	0	1	0	X	4

Sheet F	1	2	3	4	5	6	7	8	9	10	Final
Prince Edward Island (Kinney) 🔨	1	1	0	0	0	1	1	0	2	X	6
New Brunswick (Grattan)	0	0	2	1	4	0	0	2	0	X	9

Sheet H	1	2	3	4	5	6	7	8	9	10	Final
Nova Scotia (Eddy) 🔨	0	1	0	0	0	0	0	0	X	X	1
Manitoba (Galbraith)	2	0	0	2	1	1	1	1	X	X	8

==== Draw 2 ====
Sheet A	1	2	3	4	5	6	7	8	9	10	11	Final
Manitoba (Galbraith) 🔨	1	0	1	0	2	0	1	0	0	0	4	9
Saskatchewan (Cursons)	0	1	0	1	0	0	0	2	0	1	0	5

Sheet C	1	2	3	4	5	6	7	8	9	10	Final
Alberta (Dechant) 🔨	2	0	0	2	1	0	0	0	4	X	9
British Columbia (Cotter)	0	1	2	0	0	0	1	0	0	X	4

Sheet E	1	2	3	4	5	6	7	8	9	10	Final
Nova Scotia (Eddy) 🔨	3	0	1	0	1	0	0	2	1	0	8
Ontario (Ferris)	0	2	0	1	0	2	1	0	0	3	9

Sheet G	1	2	3	4	5	6	7	8	9	10	Final
Northwest Territories/Yukon (Koe) 🔨	0	0	2	1	0	1	0	0	1	0	5
Newfoundland (Davis)	0	0	0	0	1	0	0	2	0	1	4

==== Draw 3 ====
Sheet D	1	2	3	4	5	6	7	8	9	10	Final
Prince Edward Island (Kinney) 🔨	3	0	2	0	1	0	2	0	0	0	8
Northwest Territories/Yukon (Koe)	0	1	0	1	0	1	0	1	1	1	6

Sheet F	1	2	3	4	5	6	7	8	9	10	Final
Ontario (Ferris) 🔨	1	0	2	0	0	0	2	0	2	1	8
Saskatchewan (Cursons)	0	1	0	1	1	1	0	0	0	0	4

==== Draw 4 ====
Sheet A	1	2	3	4	5	6	7	8	9	10	Final
Alberta (Dechant) 🔨	0	1	0	0	2	0	1	0	1	0	5
Prince Edward Island (Kinney)	1	0	2	0	0	2	0	1	0	1	7

Sheet C	1	2	3	4	5	6	7	8	9	10	Final
Newfoundland (Davis) 🔨	0	1	0	1	0	1	0	1	1	X	5
Ontario (Ferris)	1	0	1	0	2	0	4	0	0	X	8

Sheet E	1	2	3	4	5	6	7	8	9	10	Final
Quebec (Gaudreault) 🔨	0	0	0	1	0	1	0	X	X	X	2
Northern Ontario (Belisle)	1	1	1	0	2	0	3	X	X	X	8

Sheet G	1	2	3	4	5	6	7	8	9	10	Final
British Columbia (Cotter) 🔨	0	0	0	3	0	2	0	1	0	X	6
New Brunswick (Grattan)	2	0	1	0	2	0	2	0	3	X	10

==== Draw 5 ====
Sheet B	1	2	3	4	5	6	7	8	9	10	Final
Saskatchewan (Cursons) 🔨	1	0	0	1	0	1	1	0	X	X	4
British Columbia (Cotter)	0	2	1	0	2	0	0	3	X	X	8

Sheet D	1	2	3	4	5	6	7	8	9	10	Final
Manitoba (Galbraith) 🔨	0	1	0	0	1	1	0	1	1	X	5
Alberta (Dechant)	0	0	1	0	0	0	1	0	0	X	2

Sheet F	1	2	3	4	5	6	7	8	9	10	Final
New Brunswick (Grattan) 🔨	2	0	0	2	1	1	1	1	0	X	8
Quebec (Gaudreault)	0	2	2	0	0	0	0	0	1	X	5

Sheet H	1	2	3	4	5	6	7	8	9	10	Final
Northern Ontario (Belisle) 🔨	2	0	0	0	0	1	0	2	1	1	7
Nova Scotia (Eddy)	0	0	1	2	2	0	1	0	0	0	6

==== Draw 6 ====
Sheet A	1	2	3	4	5	6	7	8	9	10	Final
New Brunswick (Grattan) 🔨	0	3	0	0	1	0	4	0	0	X	8
Northern Ontario (Belisle)	0	0	2	0	0	1	0	1	1	X	5

Sheet C	1	2	3	4	5	6	7	8	9	10	Final
Manitoba (Galbraith) 🔨	1	0	0	1	1	0	2	0	1	X	6
Prince Edward Island (Kinney)	0	0	0	0	0	1	0	1	0	X	2

Sheet E	1	2	3	4	5	6	7	8	9	10	Final
British Columbia (Cotter) 🔨	2	0	1	0	2	0	2	3	X	X	10
Quebec (Gaudreault)	0	1	0	1	0	2	0	0	X	X	4

Sheet G	1	2	3	4	5	6	7	8	9	10	Final
Nova Scotia (Eddy) 🔨	0	0	0	1	1	0	0	1	1	X	4
Alberta (Dechant)	0	1	4	0	0	2	1	0	0	X	8

==== Draw 7 ====
Sheet B	1	2	3	4	5	6	7	8	9	10	Final
Ontario (Ferris) 🔨	2	0	0	1	0	0	1	1	1	X	6
British Columbia (Cotter)	0	0	1	0	2	0	0	0	0	X	3

Sheet D	1	2	3	4	5	6	7	8	9	10	Final
Quebec (Gaudreault) 🔨	0	1	1	2	1	0	3	0	2	X	10
Nova Scotia (Eddy)	1	0	0	0	0	1	0	1	0	X	3

Sheet F	1	2	3	4	5	6	7	8	9	10	Final
Alberta (Dechant) 🔨	0	2	3	1	3	0	0	0	X	X	9
Northwest Territories/Yukon (Koe)	0	0	0	0	0	1	1	0	X	X	2

Sheet H	1	2	3	4	5	6	7	8	9	10	Final
Newfoundland (Davis) 🔨	1	1	0	0	0	1	0	1	0	X	4
Saskatchewan (Cursons)	0	0	3	2	1	0	1	0	0	X	7

==== Draw 8 ====
Sheet A	1	2	3	4	5	6	7	8	9	10	Final
Northwest Territories/Yukon (Koe) 🔨	1	0	2	0	0	0	2	0	1	X	6
Ontario (Ferris)	0	1	0	0	5	1	0	1	0	X	8

Sheet C	1	2	3	4	5	6	7	8	9	10	Final
Saskatchewan (Cursons) 🔨	0	0	1	0	0	0	0	0	0	1	2
New Brunswick (Grattan)	0	0	0	0	1	0	0	0	0	0	1

Sheet E	1	2	3	4	5	6	7	8	9	10	Final
Northern Ontario (Belisle) 🔨	1	1	0	1	0	1	0	1	1	X	6
Manitoba (Galbraith)	0	0	4	0	3	0	1	0	0	X	8

Sheet G	1	2	3	4	5	6	7	8	9	10	Final
Prince Edward Island (Kinney) 🔨	1	0	2	0	0	1	0	0	1	X	5
Newfoundland (Davis)	0	1	0	0	2	0	0	3	0	X	6

==== Draw 9 ====
Sheet B	1	2	3	4	5	6	7	8	9	10	Final
New Brunswick (Grattan) 🔨	3	0	2	0	0	2	0	0	3	X	10
Nova Scotia (Eddy)	0	2	0	1	1	0	2	0	0	X	6

Sheet D	1	2	3	4	5	6	7	8	9	10	Final
Saskatchewan (Cursons) 🔨	1	0	2	0	0	0	0	1	0	1	5
Quebec (Gaudreault)	0	1	0	1	0	0	0	0	2	0	4

Sheet F	1	2	3	4	5	6	7	8	9	10	Final
British Columbia (Cotter) 🔨	0	1	1	0	1	0	1	0	3	X	7
Northern Ontario (Belisle)	0	0	0	1	0	1	0	2	0	X	4

Sheet H	1	2	3	4	5	6	7	8	9	10	Final
Alberta (Dechant) 🔨	2	0	2	1	0	0	1	0	1	X	7
Newfoundland (Davis)	0	0	0	0	0	1	0	3	0	X	4

==== Draw 10 ====
Sheet A	1	2	3	4	5	6	7	8	9	10	Final
Ontario (Ferris) 🔨	0	0	3	0	1	0	0	1	0	X	5
New Brunswick (Grattan)	0	1	0	2	0	2	1	0	2	X	8

Sheet C	1	2	3	4	5	6	7	8	9	10	Final
Northwest Territories/Yukon (Koe) 🔨	1	0	0	2	0	1	0	3	0	0	7
Saskatchewan (Cursons)	0	0	2	0	1	0	2	0	2	1	8

Sheet E	1	2	3	4	5	6	7	8	9	10	11	12	Final
Nova Scotia (Eddy) 🔨	1	0	0	1	0	2	0	0	1	0	0	0	5
Prince Edward Island (Kinney)	0	0	1	0	0	0	2	0	0	2	0	1	6

Sheet G	1	2	3	4	5	6	7	8	9	10	Final
Quebec (Gaudreault) 🔨	2	0	0	0	0	0	X	X	X	X	2
Manitoba (Galbraith)	0	2	1	2	3	3	X	X	X	X	11

==== Draw 11 ====
Sheet B	1	2	3	4	5	6	7	8	9	10	Final
Northern Ontario (Belisle) 🔨	0	0	1	2	0	1	0	3	0	1	8
Alberta (Dechant)	1	2	0	0	1	0	1	0	1	0	6

Sheet D	1	2	3	4	5	6	7	8	9	10	Final
Prince Edward Island (Kinney) 🔨	1	3	0	0	1	0	0	3	0	X	8
Ontario (Ferris)	0	0	0	1	0	0	2	0	0	X	3

Sheet F	1	2	3	4	5	6	7	8	9	10	Final
Newfoundland (Davis) 🔨	0	0	0	1	0	1	0	2	0	X	4
British Columbia (Cotter)	3	2	1	0	2	0	2	0	2	X	12

Sheet H	1	2	3	4	5	6	7	8	9	10	Final
Manitoba (Galbraith) 🔨	2	1	1	1	1	1	1	X	X	X	8
Northwest Territories/Yukon (Koe)	0	0	0	0	0	0	0	X	X	X	0

==== Draw 12 ====
Sheet A	1	2	3	4	5	6	7	8	9	10	Final
Manitoba (Galbraith) 🔨	1	0	3	1	1	0	3	0	2	X	11
Newfoundland (Davis)	0	1	0	0	0	1	0	1	0	X	3

Sheet C	1	2	3	4	5	6	7	8	9	10	11	Final
Nova Scotia (Eddy) 🔨	0	0	0	0	0	2	1	0	1	0	1	5
Northwest Territories/Yukon (Koe)	0	0	0	0	1	0	0	1	0	2	0	4

Sheet E	1	2	3	4	5	6	7	8	9	10	Final
Alberta (Dechant) 🔨	1	0	2	0	2	0	0	1	1	1	8
Ontario (Ferris)	0	2	0	2	0	2	0	0	0	0	6

Sheet G	1	2	3	4	5	6	7	8	9	10	11	Final
Saskatchewan (Cursons) 🔨	2	0	0	0	0	3	1	1	1	0	1	9
Northern Ontario (Belisle)	0	1	3	1	1	0	0	0	0	2	0	8

==== Draw 13 ====
Sheet B	1	2	3	4	5	6	7	8	9	10	Final
Quebec (Gaudreault) 🔨	0	1	0	0	1	0	0	2	0	X	4
Alberta (Dechant)	1	0	3	0	0	3	1	0	1	X	9

Sheet D	1	2	3	4	5	6	7	8	9	10	Final
Northwest Territories/Yukon (Koe) 🔨	1	0	1	0	1	0	0	2	0	X	5
British Columbia (Cotter)	0	2	0	1	0	2	1	0	1	X	7

Sheet F	1	2	3	4	5	6	7	8	9	10	Final
Northern Ontario (Belisle) 🔨	0	1	0	1	1	0	0	2	1	X	6
Prince Edward Island (Kinney)	1	0	0	0	0	1	1	0	0	X	3

Sheet H	1	2	3	4	5	6	7	8	9	10	11	Final
New Brunswick (Grattan) 🔨	2	1	0	0	0	2	0	0	2	0	1	8
Manitoba (Galbraith)	0	0	2	0	1	0	2	1	0	1	0	7

==== Draw 14 ====
Sheet A	1	2	3	4	5	6	7	8	9	10	Final
Prince Edward Island (Kinney) 🔨	2	0	0	1	0	0	1	0	0	0	4
Saskatchewan (Cursons)	0	0	3	0	1	0	0	0	0	3	7

Sheet C	1	2	3	4	5	6	7	8	9	10	Final
Ontario (Ferris) 🔨	0	0	1	0	0	0	2	0	0	3	6
Quebec (Gaudreault)	2	1	0	1	1	1	0	0	1	0	7

Sheet E	1	2	3	4	5	6	7	8	9	10	Final
Newfoundland (Davis) 🔨	2	0	1	0	0	0	1	0	0	X	4
New Brunswick (Grattan)	0	3	0	1	2	1	0	4	1	X	12

Sheet G	1	2	3	4	5	6	7	8	9	10	Final
British Columbia (Cotter) 🔨	2	0	0	0	2	0	0	0	1	0	5
Nova Scotia (Eddy)	0	0	0	1	0	2	2	0	0	1	6

==== Draw 15 ====
Sheet B	1	2	3	4	5	6	7	8	9	10	Final
Northwest Territories/Yukon (Koe) 🔨	0	0	0	2	0	0	0	0	2	0	4
New Brunswick (Grattan)	0	0	0	0	3	0	1	1	0	3	8

Sheet D	1	2	3	4	5	6	7	8	9	10	Final
Newfoundland (Davis) 🔨	0	1	0	2	1	0	0	0	0	X	4
Quebec (Gaudreault)	2	0	3	0	0	0	0	1	3	X	9

Sheet F	1	2	3	4	5	6	7	8	9	10	Final
Manitoba (Galbraith) 🔨	1	0	2	0	0	0	2	0	0	1	6
Ontario (Ferris)	0	1	0	2	2	1	0	1	0	0	7

Sheet H	1	2	3	4	5	6	7	8	9	10	Final
Prince Edward Island (Kinney) 🔨	0	2	1	0	1	1	0	0	1	1	7
British Columbia (Cotter)	2	0	0	2	0	0	2	2	0	0	8

==== Draw 16 ====
Sheet A	1	2	3	4	5	6	7	8	9	10	Final
Nova Scotia (Eddy) 🔨	3	0	0	1	0	1	1	1	3	X	10
Newfoundland (Davis)	0	1	1	0	3	0	0	0	0	X	5

Sheet C	1	2	3	4	5	6	7	8	9	10	Final
British Columbia (Cotter) 🔨	0	1	0	2	3	0	0	0	X	X	6
Manitoba (Galbraith)	0	0	1	0	0	0	1	0	X	X	2

Sheet E	1	2	3	4	5	6	7	8	9	10	Final
Alberta (Dechant) 🔨	0	1	0	3	2	0	0	0	2	0	8
Saskatchewan (Cursons)	1	0	2	0	0	2	2	2	0	1	10

Sheet G	1	2	3	4	5	6	7	8	9	10	11	Final
Ontario (Ferris) 🔨	0	0	1	0	1	0	0	0	1	1	0	4
Northern Ontario (Belisle)	1	0	0	0	0	0	2	1	0	0	1	5

==== Draw 17 ====
Sheet B	1	2	3	4	5	6	7	8	9	10	Final
Northern Ontario (Belisle) 🔨	1	0	0	1	0	1	1	1	0	X	5
Northwest Territories/Yukon (Koe)	0	0	4	0	2	0	0	0	2	X	8

Sheet D	1	2	3	4	5	6	7	8	9	10	Final
New Brunswick (Grattan) 🔨	1	0	1	0	0	0	1	1	1	X	5
Alberta (Dechant)	0	1	0	2	0	0	0	0	0	X	3

Sheet F	1	2	3	4	5	6	7	8	9	10	Final
Saskatchewan (Cursons) 🔨	0	0	0	1	0	0	2	0	0	1	4
Nova Scotia (Eddy)	0	0	1	0	0	1	0	0	1	0	3

Sheet H	1	2	3	4	5	6	7	8	9	10	Final
Quebec (Gaudreault) 🔨	2	0	1	1	3	0	0	3	X	X	10
Prince Edward Island (Kinney)	0	2	0	0	0	2	1	0	X	X	5

=== Playoffs ===
Semifinal		Final
Saskatchewan	4
Manitoba	6	New Brunswick	2
		Manitoba	8

==== Semifinal ====
Sheet B	1	2	3	4	5	6	7	8	9	10	Final
Saskatchewan (Cursons)	0	0	2	0	1	0	1	0	0	0	4
Manitoba (Galbraith) 🔨	0	1	0	3	0	1	0	0	0	1	6

Player percentages
Saskatchewan		Manitoba	
Jamie Burrows	84%	Bryan Galbraith	69%
Rob Nixon	81%	Brent Barrett	71%
Pat Simmons	73%	Scott Cripps	78%
Neil Cursons	69%	Chris Galbraith	84%
Total	77%	Total	75%

==== Final ====
Sheet B	1	2	3	4	5	6	7	8	9	10	Final
New Brunswick (Grattan) 🔨	1	0	0	1	0	0	0	X	X	X	2
Manitoba (Galbraith)	0	0	3	0	3	1	1	X	X	X	8

Player percentages
New Brunswick		Manitoba	
Jeff Lacey	73%	Bryan Galbraith	77%
Spencer Mawhinney	84%	Brent Barrett	88%
Kevin Boyle	82%	Scott Cripps	84%
James Grattan	68%	Chris Galbraith	95%
Total	77%	Total	86%

== Women's ==
=== Teams ===
Province / Territory	Skip	Third	Second	Lead
Northwest Territories/Yukon	Tara Hamer	Kerry Koe	Shona Barbour	Sheena Yakeleya
Northern Ontario	Jennifer Bolton	Lori Pritchard	Corrine Briel	Kim Erechook
Alberta	Jody Lee	Lori Olson	Karyanne Kjelshus	Diane Lee
Manitoba	Kelly MacKenzie	Joanne Fillion	Carlene Muth	Sasha Bergner
New Brunswick	Susie LeBlanc	Paula Nicol	Allison Franey	Pamela Nicol
Saskatchewan	Sherry Linton	Cindy Street	Angela Street	Allison Tanner
Nova Scotia	Sara Jane Rawding	Christina Patterson	Andrea Smith	Lisa Allen
Newfoundland	Heather Strong	Kelli Sharpe	Emily Gibbons	Joanne Durant
Quebec	Marie-France Larouche	Melanie Roy	Nancy Belanger	Marie-Eve Letourneau
Ontario	Kirsten Harmark	Nicole Pellegrin	Catherine Kemp	Andra Harmark
Prince Edward Island	Angela Sutherland	Lisa MacRae	Shannon Perry	Jennifer Coady
British Columbia	Michelle Harding	Shalegh Beddington	Denise Byers	Kim Danderfer
Canada	Jennifer Jones	Tricha Baldwin	Jill Officer	Dana Malanchuk

=== Standings ===
Locale	Skip	W	L
Canada	Jennifer Jones	0	0
Quebec	Marie-France Larouche	9	2
Ontario	Kirsten Harmark	8	3
Manitoba	Kelly MacKenzie	7	4
New Brunswick	Susie LeBlanc	6	5
Saskatchewan	Sherry Linton	6	5
Nova Scotia	Sara Jane Rawding	6	5
British Columbia	Michelle Harding	6	5
Alberta	Jody Lee	5	6
Northern Ontario	Jennifer Bolton	4	7
Prince Edward Island	Angela Sutherland	4	7
Northwest Territories/Yukon	Tara Hamer	3	8
Newfoundland	Heather Strong	2	9

=== Results ===
==== Draw 1 ====
Sheet A	1	2	3	4	5	6	7	8	9	10	Final
Yukon/Northwest Territories (Hamer) 🔨	4	0	1	1	0	1	0	0	2	0	9
Northern Ontario (Bolton)	0	3	0	0	3	0	1	2	0	3	12

Sheet C	1	2	3	4	5	6	7	8	9	10	Final
Alberta (Lee) 🔨	2	0	0	0	1	0	2	0	0	X	5
Manitoba (MacKenzie)	0	0	2	1	0	2	0	0	2	X	7

Sheet E	1	2	3	4	5	6	7	8	9	10	Final
New Brunswick (LeBlanc) 🔨	0	1	0	1	0	0	1	0	X	X	3
Saskatchewan (Linton)	2	0	2	0	2	4	0	4	X	X	14

Sheet G	1	2	3	4	5	6	7	8	9	10	Final
Nova Scotia (Rawding) 🔨	2	0	0	1	0	4	1	2	X	X	10
Newfoundland (Strong)	0	0	1	0	1	0	0	0	X	X	2

==== Draw 2 ====
Sheet B	1	2	3	4	5	6	7	8	9	10	Final
Newfoundland (Strong) 🔨	1	0	1	0	0	2	0	2	0	X	6
Saskatchewan (Linton)	0	2	0	0	2	0	4	0	3	X	11

Sheet D	1	2	3	4	5	6	7	8	9	10	Final
Northwest Territories/Yukon (Hamer) 🔨	0	0	2	0	0	1	1	0	0	X	4
Quebec (Larouche)	0	1	0	3	2	0	0	2	2	X	10

Sheet F	1	2	3	4	5	6	7	8	9	10	Final
British Columbia (Harding) 🔨	1	0	0	0	1	0	0	2	0	X	4
Ontario (Harmark)	0	1	1	1	0	3	1	0	3	X	10

Sheet H	1	2	3	4	5	6	7	8	9	10	Final
Northern Ontario (Bolton) 🔨	0	2	0	0	0	0	X	X	X	X	2
Prince Edward Island (Sutherland)	2	0	5	2	1	2	X	X	X	X	12

==== Draw 3 ====
Sheet C	1	2	3	4	5	6	7	8	9	10	Final
Quebec (Larouche) 🔨	1	0	0	2	1	1	0	0	2	X	7
Prince Edward Island (Sutherland)	0	0	1	0	0	0	3	0	0	X	4

Sheet E	1	2	3	4	5	6	7	8	9	10	Final
Alberta (Lee) 🔨	0	1	0	5	2	0	1	4	X	X	13
Newfoundland (Strong)	1	0	2	0	0	1	0	0	X	X	4

==== Draw 4 ====
Sheet B	1	2	3	4	5	6	7	8	9	10	11	Final
Ontario (Harmark) 🔨	1	1	1	0	3	0	0	0	1	0	1	8
Manitoba (MacKenzie)	0	0	0	1	0	3	0	1	0	2	0	7

Sheet D	1	2	3	4	5	6	7	8	9	10	Final
Nova Scotia (Rawding) 🔨	0	1	0	2	1	2	0	0	1	X	7
New Brunswick (LeBlanc)	0	0	3	0	0	0	1	0	0	X	4

Sheet F	1	2	3	4	5	6	7	8	9	10	Final
Saskatchewan (Linton) 🔨	0	1	2	0	0	0	1	0	X	X	4
Quebec (Larouche)	1	0	0	4	2	2	0	1	X	X	10

Sheet H	1	2	3	4	5	6	7	8	9	10	Final
British Columbia (Harding) 🔨	0	0	2	0	0	1	1	0	1	0	5
Alberta (Lee)	0	0	0	2	2	0	0	1	0	1	6

==== Draw 5 ====
Sheet A	1	2	3	4	5	6	7	8	9	10	Final
New Brunswick (LeBlanc) 🔨	0	2	0	0	2	1	2	0	3	X	10
Northwest Territories/Yukon (Hamer)	0	0	1	1	0	0	0	3	0	X	5

Sheet C	1	2	3	4	5	6	7	8	9	10	Final
Manitoba (MacKenzie) 🔨	0	1	0	1	0	1	0	0	0	0	3
Nova Scotia (Rawding)	0	0	0	0	2	0	1	1	1	2	7

Sheet E	1	2	3	4	5	6	7	8	9	10	Final
Northern Ontario (Bolton) 🔨	2	0	1	1	0	1	0	1	0	X	6
British Columbia (Harding)	0	1	0	0	1	0	0	0	2	X	4

Sheet G	1	2	3	4	5	6	7	8	9	10	Final
Prince Edward Island (Sutherland) 🔨	2	0	2	0	0	4	0	2	2	X	12
Ontario (Harmark)	0	0	0	3	3	0	2	0	0	X	8

==== Draw 6 ====
Sheet B	1	2	3	4	5	6	7	8	9	10	Final
Northwest Territories/Yukon (Hamer) 🔨	1	0	0	0	2	0	0	0	1	0	4
British Columbia (Harding)	0	1	1	0	0	0	3	0	0	1	6

Sheet D	1	2	3	4	5	6	7	8	9	10	Final
Ontario (Harmark) 🔨	1	0	0	0	0	2	0	1	X	X	4
Nova Scotia (Rawding)	0	1	1	3	1	0	2	0	X	X	8

Sheet F	1	2	3	4	5	6	7	8	9	10	Final
Northern Ontario (Bolton) 🔨	0	3	1	0	0	0	0	2	0	X	6
Alberta (Lee)	2	0	0	1	2	0	1	0	3	X	9

Sheet H	1	2	3	4	5	6	7	8	9	10	Final
Manitoba (MacKenzie) 🔨	0	0	3	2	0	2	0	0	0	0	7
New Brunswick (LeBlanc)	3	0	0	0	1	0	1	1	1	1	8

==== Draw 7 ====
Sheet A	1	2	3	4	5	6	7	8	9	10	Final
Saskatchewan (Linton) 🔨	6	0	1	0	1	0	3	X	X	X	11
Prince Edward Island (Sutherland)	0	2	0	1	0	1	0	X	X	X	4

Sheet C	1	2	3	4	5	6	7	8	9	10	Final
British Columbia (Harding) 🔨	2	2	0	3	0	1	1	0	0	X	9
Newfoundland (Strong)	0	0	2	0	1	0	0	2	1	X	6

Sheet E	1	2	3	4	5	6	7	8	9	10	Final
Nova Scotia (Rawding) 🔨	2	0	0	0	0	0	1	2	1	0	6
Northwest Territories/Yukon (Hamer)	0	3	0	0	1	2	0	0	0	1	7

Sheet G	1	2	3	4	5	6	7	8	9	10	Final
Quebec (Larouche) 🔨	0	0	0	1	1	0	0	0	2	X	4
Ontario (Harmark)	0	0	3	0	0	2	1	2	0	X	8

==== Draw 8 ====
Sheet B	1	2	3	4	5	6	7	8	9	10	Final
Alberta (Lee) 🔨	0	1	0	1	0	0	0	X	X	X	2
Saskatchewan (Linton)	2	0	3	0	0	0	4	X	X	X	9

Sheet D	1	2	3	4	5	6	7	8	9	10	Final
New Brunswick (LeBlanc) 🔨	1	0	1	0	0	1	1	1	0	1	6
Northern Ontario (Bolton)	0	2	0	1	1	0	0	0	1	0	5

Sheet F	1	2	3	4	5	6	7	8	9	10	Final
Prince Edward Island (Sutherland) 🔨	0	3	1	1	0	1	0	1	0	1	8
Manitoba (MacKenzie)	0	0	0	0	1	0	1	0	5	0	7

Sheet H	1	2	3	4	5	6	7	8	9	10	11	12	Final
Newfoundland (Strong) 🔨	2	2	0	1	0	2	0	0	0	1	0	0	8
Quebec (Larouche)	0	0	3	0	1	0	2	1	1	0	0	3	11

==== Draw 9 ====
Sheet A	1	2	3	4	5	6	7	8	9	10	Final
British Columbia (Harding) 🔨	0	0	3	0	0	2	0	1	0	1	7
Saskatchewan (Linton)	0	1	0	1	1	0	2	0	1	0	6

Sheet C	1	2	3	4	5	6	7	8	9	10	Final
Ontario (Harmark) 🔨	0	1	0	1	1	0	2	0	3	X	8
New Brunswick (LeBlanc)	1	0	0	0	0	1	0	1	0	X	3

Sheet E	1	2	3	4	5	6	7	8	9	10	Final
Prince Edward Island (Sutherland) 🔨	2	0	0	3	2	0	0	4	1	X	12
Nova Scotia (Rawding)	0	2	0	0	0	2	1	0	0	X	5

Sheet G	1	2	3	4	5	6	7	8	9	10	Final
Manitoba (MacKenzie) 🔨	3	1	0	3	2	2	X	X	X	X	11
Northwest Territories/Yukon (Hamer)	0	0	0	0	0	0	X	X	X	X	0

==== Draw 10 ====
Sheet B	1	2	3	4	5	6	7	8	9	10	11	Final
Nova Scotia (Rawding) 🔨	0	0	2	0	2	0	2	0	1	1	0	8
Northern Ontario (Bolton)	2	2	0	1	0	2	0	1	0	0	1	9

Sheet D	1	2	3	4	5	6	7	8	9	10	Final
Northwest Territories/Yukon (Hamer) 🔨	0	0	1	1	1	0	1	0	0	X	4
Alberta (Lee)	2	2	0	0	0	3	0	2	5	X	14

Sheet F	1	2	3	4	5	6	7	8	9	10	Final
Newfoundland (Strong) 🔨	2	1	0	0	2	0	1	0	2	X	8
Prince Edward Island (Sutherland)	0	0	0	1	0	3	0	2	0	X	6

Sheet H	1	2	3	4	5	6	7	8	9	10	Final
Quebec (Larouche) 🔨	0	1	1	1	0	1	0	1	0	X	5
Manitoba (MacKenzie)	2	0	0	0	2	0	3	0	1	X	8

==== Draw 11 ====
Sheet A	1	2	3	4	5	6	7	8	9	10	11	Final
Northern Ontario (Bolton) 🔨	0	0	1	0	1	0	3	0	2	0	1	8
Newfoundland (Strong)	1	1	0	2	0	1	0	1	0	1	0	7

Sheet C	1	2	3	4	5	6	7	8	9	10	11	Final
Saskatchewan (Linton) 🔨	1	0	2	0	0	0	1	0	0	1	0	5
Ontario (Harmark)	0	2	0	0	1	0	0	0	2	0	1	6

Sheet E	1	2	3	4	5	6	7	8	9	10	11	Final
Alberta (Lee) 🔨	0	1	0	1	0	0	2	0	2	0	0	6
Quebec (Larouche)	0	0	2	0	0	1	0	1	0	2	1	7

Sheet G	1	2	3	4	5	6	7	8	9	10	Final
New Brunswick (LeBlanc) 🔨	0	0	0	0	1	0	0	1	1	0	3
British Columbia (Harding)	1	0	0	1	0	0	1	0	0	2	5

==== Draw 12 ====
Sheet B	1	2	3	4	5	6	7	8	9	10	Final
Prince Edward Island (Sutherland) 🔨	0	0	0	2	0	0	0	0	X	X	2
New Brunswick (LeBlanc)	1	1	1	0	2	0	1	3	X	X	9

Sheet D	1	2	3	4	5	6	7	8	9	10	Final
British Columbia (Harding) 🔨	0	1	0	0	0	2	1	0	1	0	5
Quebec (Larouche)	1	0	2	0	0	0	0	2	0	1	6

Sheet F	1	2	3	4	5	6	7	8	9	10	Final
Northwest Territories/Yukon (Hamer) 🔨	0	1	1	2	0	0	2	0	1	1	8
Newfoundland (Strong)	3	0	0	0	1	1	0	1	0	0	6

Sheet H	1	2	3	4	5	6	7	8	9	10	Final
Northern Ontario (Bolton) 🔨	0	1	0	0	0	3	0	0	X	X	4
Saskatchewan (Linton)	2	0	1	2	1	0	4	3	X	X	13

==== Draw 13 ====
Sheet A	1	2	3	4	5	6	7	8	9	10	Final
Manitoba (MacKenzie) 🔨	0	2	2	0	0	1	0	1	3	X	9
Northern Ontario (Bolton)	0	0	0	2	2	0	1	0	0	X	5

Sheet C	1	2	3	4	5	6	7	8	9	10	Final
New Brunswick (LeBlanc) 🔨	2	0	1	0	0	2	0	2	0	1	8
Alberta (Lee)	0	1	0	3	0	0	1	0	1	0	6

Sheet E	1	2	3	4	5	6	7	8	9	10	Final
Newfoundland (Strong) 🔨	0	0	1	0	0	0	3	0	1	X	5
Ontario (Harmark)	0	0	0	1	1	0	0	1	0	X	3

Sheet G	1	2	3	4	5	6	7	8	9	10	Final
Nova Scotia (Rawding) 🔨	1	0	1	0	1	0	1	0	3	0	7
British Columbia (Harding)	0	3	0	1	0	2	0	1	0	1	8

==== Draw 14 ====
Sheet B	1	2	3	4	5	6	7	8	9	10	Final
Ontario (Harmark) 🔨	1	3	0	0	4	0	1	0	2	X	11
Northwest Territories/Yukon (Hamer)	0	0	1	1	0	1	0	1	0	X	4

Sheet D	1	2	3	4	5	6	7	8	9	10	Final
Saskatchewan (Linton) 🔨	2	0	0	1	0	1	0	2	0	0	6
Manitoba (MacKenzie)	0	2	0	0	2	0	1	0	2	1	8

Sheet F	1	2	3	4	5	6	7	8	9	10	Final
Quebec (Larouche) 🔨	0	3	0	1	2	0	1	0	0	0	7
Nova Scotia (Rawding)	1	0	0	0	0	1	0	2	1	0	5

Sheet H	1	2	3	4	5	6	7	8	9	10	Final
Alberta (Lee) 🔨	0	1	0	3	0	0	1	2	0	2	9
Prince Edward Island (Sutherland)	1	0	2	0	1	1	0	0	3	0	8

==== Draw 15 ====
Sheet A	1	2	3	4	5	6	7	8	9	10	Final
Alberta (Lee) 🔨	0	0	0	2	0	1	1	0	0	0	4
Ontario (Harmark)	0	2	1	0	1	0	0	1	1	2	8

Sheet C	1	2	3	4	5	6	7	8	9	10	Final
Northern Ontario (Bolton) 🔨	3	0	2	0	0	1	0	0	1	0	7
Quebec (Larouche)	0	1	0	2	1	0	0	2	0	2	8

Sheet E	1	2	3	4	5	6	7	8	9	10	Final
Saskatchewan (Linton) 🔨	0	0	0	0	2	0	0	1	0	X	3
Nova Scotia (Rawding)	0	0	2	0	0	0	3	0	2	X	7

Sheet G	1	2	3	4	5	6	7	8	9	10	Final
Newfoundland (Strong) 🔨	1	0	1	0	0	1	0	0	X	X	3
Manitoba (MacKenzie)	0	0	0	2	2	0	2	3	X	X	9

==== Draw 16 ====
Sheet B	1	2	3	4	5	6	7	8	9	10	Final
Quebec (Larouche) 🔨	1	0	1	0	1	0	0	0	1	2	6
New Brunswick (LeBlanc)	0	2	0	1	0	0	2	0	0	0	5

Sheet D	1	2	3	4	5	6	7	8	9	10	Final
British Columbia (Harding) 🔨	4	0	0	1	0	0	5	X	X	X	10
Prince Edward Island (Sutherland)	0	1	1	0	0	2	0	X	X	X	4

Sheet F	1	2	3	4	5	6	7	8	9	10	Final
Ontario (Harmark) 🔨	0	1	0	2	1	0	1	2	0	X	7
Northern Ontario (Bolton)	1	0	2	0	0	1	0	0	1	X	5

Sheet H	1	2	3	4	5	6	7	8	9	10	Final
Northwest Territories/Yukon (Hamer) 🔨	2	0	1	0	0	3	0	0	2	0	8
Saskatchewan (Linton)	0	2	0	3	1	0	2	1	0	1	10

==== Draw 17 ====
Sheet A	1	2	3	4	5	6	7	8	9	10	Final
Nova Scotia (Rawding) 🔨	0	0	4	1	0	1	0	3	0	0	9
Alberta (Lee)	1	0	0	0	2	0	1	0	3	1	8

Sheet C	1	2	3	4	5	6	7	8	9	10	Final
Prince Edward Island (Sutherland) 🔨	1	0	0	4	0	0	3	0	1	0	9
Northwest Territories/Yukon (Hamer)	0	2	1	0	1	1	0	5	0	1	11

Sheet E	1	2	3	4	5	6	7	8	9	10	Final
Manitoba (MacKenzie) 🔨	0	2	1	0	1	1	1	0	1	X	7
British Columbia (Harding)	0	0	0	1	0	0	0	1	0	X	2

Sheet G	1	2	3	4	5	6	7	8	9	10	Final
New Brunswick (LeBlanc) 🔨	1	1	0	0	0	0	0	1	0	2	5
Newfoundland (Strong)	0	0	0	0	1	0	1	0	2	0	4

=== Playoffs ===
Semifinal
1	Canada	4
4	Manitoba	9
2	Quebec	4
3	Ontario	6

Final
3	Ontario	2
4	Manitoba	5

==== Semifinals ====
Sheet F	1	2	3	4	5	6	7	8	9	10	Final
Canada (Jones) 🔨	1	1	0	1	0	0	1	0	0	X	4
Manitoba (MacKenzie)	0	0	2	0	4	1	0	1	1	X	9

Player percentages
Canada		Manitoba	
Dana Malanchuk	72%	Carlene Muth	62%
Jill Officer	75%	Sasha Bergner	65%
Tricha Baldwin	51%	Joanne Fillion	57%
Jennifer Jones	53%	Kelly MacKenzie	68%
Total	63%	Total	63%

Sheet G	1	2	3	4	5	6	7	8	9	10	Final
Quebec (Larouche) 🔨	0	2	0	1	0	0	1	0	0	0	4
Ontario (Harmark)	1	0	0	0	2	2	0	0	0	1	6

Player percentages
Quebec		Ontario	
Marie-Eve Letourneau	63%	Andra Harmark	73%
Nancy Belanger	57%	Catherine Kemp	63%
Melanie Roy	63%	Nicole Pellegrin	53%
Marie-France Larouche	55%	Kirsten Harmark	68%
Total	59%	Total	64%

==== Final ====
Sheet B	1	2	3	4	5	6	7	8	9	10	Final
Ontario (Harmark) 🔨	0	0	1	0	0	0	0	0	1	X	2
Manitoba (MacKenzie)	0	0	0	1	1	1	1	1	0	X	5

Player percentages
Ontario		Manitoba	
Andra Harmark	68%	Carlene Muth	58%
Catherine Kemp	56%	Sasha Bergner	74%
Nicole Pellegrin	68%	Joanne Fillion	69%
Kirsten Harmark	56%	Kelly MacKenzie	68%
Total	62%	Total	67%

== Qualification ==
=== Ontario ===
The Ontario Junior Curling Championships were held January 11–15 at the St. Catharines Golf & Country Club in St. Catharines.

Kirsten Harmark of Milton won the event, defeating Julie Anderson of Unionville in the final, 6-5. Harmark finished in first in the round robin with a 5–2 record, earning a bye to the final. Anderson (4–3) defeated Donna Schell (5–2) in the semifinal after defeating Kim Gellard of Unionville in a tiebreaker.

Pat Ferris of Peterborough defeated two-time provincial junior champion Joe Frans of the host St. Catharines club in the men's final, 6–5 in an extra end. Frans had earned a bye to the final after finishing first in the round robin. Ferris earned a trip to the final after beating Dale Matchett of Bradford in the semifinal.
