= 2012 Quebec Scotties Tournament of Hearts =

Women's curling championship

The 2012 Quebec Scotties Tournament of Hearts was held from January 25 to 29 at the Club de Curling Kénogami in Jonquière, Quebec. The winning team of Marie-France Larouche, represented Quebec at the 2012 Scotties Tournament of Hearts in Red Deer, Alberta, where she finished round robin with a 7-4 record. This was enough to clinch a spot in the playoffs in the 3-4 game. Larouche and team would lose both the 3-4 game and the bronze medal game.

== Format Changes ==
The 2011-12 season will see a new format for both the men and women's provincial playdowns. The women's tournament will now consist of eight teams playing in a triple knockout format, and a page playoff consisting of three teams. Four teams will qualify from the four Quebec regions, and four teams will qualify through the points system. This change means that the defending champions from the previous season will no longer receive a berth into the provincial playdowns and that two fewer teams will compete in the provincial playdowns.

Teams	Qualification method	Berths	Qualifying team
Team 1	Quebec Championship points finish – first place	1	Kim Mastine
Team 2	Quebec Championship points finish – second place	1	Marie-France Larouche
Team 3	Quebec Championship points finish – third place	1	Allison Ross
Team 4	Quebec Championship points finish – fourth place	1	Julie Hamel
Team 5	Regional Qualifier Montréal	1	Siân Canavan
Team 6	Regional Qualifier Sag / Lac	1	Nathalie Gagnon
Team 7	Regional Qualifier Québec	1	Marie-Christine Cantin
Team 8	Regional Qualifier Sud-Ouest	1	Hélène Pelchat

== Teams ==
Skip	Third	Second	Lead	Club(s)
Siân Canavan	Brittany Connell	Marion Van Horne	Audree Debay	Royal Montreal Curling Club, Montreal
Marie-Christine Cantin	Andreanne Cantin	Virginie Lessard	Anik Brascoup	Club de curling Etchemin, Saint-Romuald
Nathalie Gagnon	Ginette Simard	Josée Friolet	Marie-Josée Précourt	Club de curling Kénogami, Jonquière
Julie Hamel	Karine Marchand	Marie-Pier Côté	Joëlle St-Hilaire	Club de curling Kénogami, Jonquière
Marie-France Larouche	Brenda Nicholls	Amélie Blais	Anne-Marie Filteau	Club de curling Etchemin, Saint-Romuald, Quebec
Kim Mastine	Nathalie Audet	Audrée Dufresne	Saskia Hollands	Club de curling Boucherville, Boucherville
Hélène Pelchat	Chantal Gadoua	Kathleen Boyer	Marie-Claude Comeau	Club de curling Valleyfield, Valleyfield, Quebec
Allison Ross	Kristen Richards	Brittany O'Rourke	Sasha Beauchamp	Club de curling Glenmore, Dollard-des-Ormeaux

== Standings ==
Skip (Club)	W	L
Kim Mastine (Boucherville)	3	0
Marie-France Larouche (Etchemin)	4	1
Allison Ross (Glenmore)	4	2
Julie Hamel (Kénogami)	2	3
Nathalie Gagnon (Kénogami)	2	3
Siân Canavan (Royal Montreal)	1	3
Marie-Christine Cantin (Etchemin)	1	3
Hélène Pelchat (Valleyfield)	1	3

== Knockout results ==
=== A event ===
First Knockout
Kim Mastine	9
Hélène Pelchat	3
Julie Hamel	5
Nathalie Gagnon	14
Allison Ross	6
Marie-Christine Cantin	5
Marie-France Larouche	12
Siân Canavan	2

Semifinals
Kim Mastine	9
Nathalie Gagnon	1
Allison Ross	5
Marie-France Larouche	4

Qualifier 1
Kim Mastine	10
Allison Ross	5

=== B event ===
Second Knockout
Hélène Pelchat	9
Julie Hamel	6
Marie-Christine Cantin	8
Siân Canavan	6

Quarterfinals
Marie-France Larouche	10
Hélène Pelchat	5
Nathalie Gagnon	11
Marie-Christine Cantin	3

Semifinals
Marie-France Larouche	9
Nathalie Gagnon	6

Qualifier 2
Marie-France Larouche	8
Allison Ross	4

=== C event ===
Third Knockout
Julie Hamel	7
Marie-Christine Cantin	3
Siân Canavan	8
Hélène Pelchat	1

Semifinals
Nathalie Gagnon	4
Julie Hamel	8
Allison Ross	10
Siân Canavan	1

Qualifier 3
Julie Hamel	3
Allison Ross	9

== Playoffs ==
Semifinal
1	Kim Mastine	4
2	Marie-France Larouche	9
3	Allison Ross	10
1	Kim Mastine	6

Final
2	Marie-France Larouche	10
3	Allison Ross	3

=== 1 vs 2 ===
January 28, 7:00 PM ET

Team	1	2	3	4	5	6	7	8	9	10	Final
Mastine	0	0	0	1	0	2	0	1	0	X	4
Larouche	0	0	3	0	1	0	2	0	3	X	9

=== Semifinal ===
January 29, 9:00 AM ET

Team	1	2	3	4	5	6	7	8	9	10	Final
Ross	2	0	1	0	2	0	3	0	2	X	10
Mastine	0	2	0	2	0	1	0	1	0	X	6

=== Final ===
January 29, 2:00 PM ET

Team	1	2	3	4	5	6	7	8	9	10	Final
Larouche	0	0	1	1	2	0	4	0	2	X	10
Ross	0	1	0	0	0	1	0	1	0	X	3

2012 Quebec Scotties Tournament of Hearts

Marie-France Larouche
Quebec Provincial Championship title
