= Joëlle Sabourin =

Canadian curler

- Curler ♀
- Born: May 28, 1972 (age 54); Hull, Quebec, Canada

Team
- Curling club: Club de Curling Thurso, Thurso

Curling career
- Member Association: Quebec; Ontario (2003–07)
- Hearts: 8 (1994, 1997, 1999, 2000, 2005, 2008, 2009, 2011)
Medal record
Curling
Scotties Tournament of Hearts
Bronze medal – third place	2009 Victoria

Joëlle Sabourin (born May 28, 1972) is a Canadian curler from Gatineau.

Born in Hull, Quebec, Canada, Sabourin is a five-time provincial champion for her native Quebec, earning her the right to play at five national championships (the Scotties Tournament of Hearts). In 1997 she won as Chantal Osborne's second, in 1999 and 2000 as Janique Berthelot's third, and in 2008 and 2009 playing lead for Marie-France Larouche. Three times she played in the Scotties as an alternate: in 1994 for Agnes Charette, in 2005 for Ontario's Jenn Hanna and in 2011 for Marie-France Larouche.

In 2001 Sabourin won the Canadian Mixed Curling Championship playing lead for Jean-Michel Ménard.

From 2004 to 2007, Sabourin played in Ontario for Jenn Hanna. In 2004 and 2006 she was the team's third. In 2005, when she was pregnant, Sabourin was the team's alternate. It was that season that the team lost in the 2005 Scott Tournament of Hearts finals to Jennifer Jones. In 2007, Sabourin played lead and second for the team before leaving it to play for Larouche. In 2010 season Sabourin joined Chantal Osborne and now plays third stones. Sabourin will play five major events on the curling tour, at the beginning of 2011, with Jennifer Jones, as a replacement for Jill Officer who will be on maternity leave from September to December. Although Sabourin was initially planning to take the year off, she will also play several tour events with her Quebec team.

== Teams ==
=== Women's ===
Season	Skip	Third	Second	Lead	Alternate	Coach	Events
1993–94	Agnes Charette	France Charette	Chantal Osborne	Sylvie Daniel	Joelle Sabourin		STOH 1994 (8th)
1996–97	Chantal Osborne	France Charette	Joelle Sabourin	Sylvie Daniel	Janique Berthelot	Gerry Tomalty	STOH 1997 (6th)
1998–99	Janique Berthelot	Joelle Sabourin	Annie Lemay	Nancy Lemire			STOH 1999 (12th)
1999–00	Janique Berthelot	Joelle Sabourin	Annie Lemay	Valerie Leclerc	Marie-France Larouche	Benoit Cyr	STOH 2000 (8th)
2003–04	Jenn Hanna	Joelle Sabourin	Dawn Askin	Stephanie Hanna			
2004–05	Jenn Hanna	Pascale Letendre	Dawn Askin	Stephanie Hanna	Joelle Sabourin	Robert Hanna	STOH 2005 (9th)
2005–06	Jenn Hanna	Joelle Sabourin	Dawn Askin	Stephanie Hanna			
2006–07	Jenn Hanna	Chrissy Cadorin	Joelle Sabourin	Stephanie Hanna			
2007–08	Marie-France Larouche	Nancy Bélanger	Annie Lemay	Joelle Sabourin	Valérie Grenier	Camil Larouche	STOH 2008 (4th)
2008–09	Marie-France Larouche	Nancy Bélanger	Annie Lemay	Joelle Sabourin	Veronique Brassard	Camil Larouche	STOH 2009 (bronze)
2008–09	Marie-France Larouche	Nancy Bélanger	Annie Lemay	Joelle Sabourin			CC 2009 (silver)
2009–10	Marie-France Larouche	Nancy Bélanger	Annie Lemay	Joelle Sabourin			
2010–11	Marie-France Larouche	Annie Lemay	Véronique Grégoire	Veronique Brassard	Joelle Sabourin	Camil Larouche	STOH 2011 (8th)
2010–11	Chantal Osborne	Joëlle Sabourin	Catherine Derick	Sylvie Daniel			
2011–12	Jennifer Jones	Kaitlyn Lawes	Joëlle Sabourin	Dawn Askin			CC 2011 (gold)
2011–12	Chantal Osborne	Joëlle Sabourin	Catherine Derick	Sylvie Daniel			
2012–13	Chantal Osborne	Joëlle Sabourin	Catherine Derick	Sylvie Daniel			
2018–19	Amélie Blais	Janique Berthelot	Brittany O'Rourke	Vicky Tremblay	Joëlle Sabourin		QC STOH 2019

=== Mixed ===
Season	Skip	Third	Second	Lead	Events
1996–97	Guy Hemmings	Nathalie Audet	Michael Fournier	Joëlle Sabourin	CMxCC 1997 (6th)
2000–01	Jean-Michel Ménard	Jessica Marchand	Marco Berthelot	Joëlle Sabourin	CMxCC 2001 (gold)
