= 2026 Quebec Women's Curling Championship =

Canadian provincial women's curling championship

- Host city: Rimouski, Quebec
- Arena: Complexe Sportif Desjardins
- Dates: January 4–7
- Winner: Team Fortin
- Curling club: CC Kénogami, Jonquière
- Skip: Jolianne Fortin
- Third: Emy Lafrance
- Second: Megan Lafrance
- Lead: Mégane Fortin
- Coach: Brandon Lafrance
- Finalist: Team St-Georges

The 2026 Quebec Women's Curling Championship (French: Championnat provincial féminin 2026), the provincial women's curling championship of Quebec, was held from January 4 to 7 at the Complexe Sportif Desjardins in Rimouski, Quebec. The winning Jolianne Fortin rink represented Quebec at the 2026 Scotties Tournament of Hearts in Mississauga, Ontario. The event was held in conjunction with the 2026 Quebec Tankard, the provincial men's curling championship.

== Teams ==
The teams are listed as follows:

Skip	Third	Second	Lead	Alternate	Coach	Club(s)
Myriam Arsenault	Claudie Beaulieu	Noémie Bélanger	Karina Thériault			Rivière-du-Loup
Jolianne Fortin	– (Note: Team Fortin played with three players.)	Megan Lafrance	Mégane Fortin	Emy Lafrance	Brandon Lafrance	Kénogami
Anne-Sophie Gionest	Kelly Tremblay	Sarah Bergeron	Amélie Maheux			Riverbend/Nairn/St-Bruno
Dominique Jean	Delphine Beauchemin	Alison Davies	Berkley Petersen			Montreal Ouest/St-Lambert/Glenmore
Laurie St-Georges (Fourth)	Sarah Daniels (Skip) (Note: Sarah Daniels skipped Team Laurie St-Georges.)	Emily Riley	Émilia Gagné			Glenmore/Laval-sur-le-Lac
Valérie Tanguay	Lisianne Ouellet	Maude-Alexandra Hébert	Nathalie Thibault			Rivière-du-Loup

=== Map of teams ===
Quebec Women's Curling Championship Teams

== Round robin standings ==
Final Round Robin Standings

Key
Teams to Playoffs

Skip	W	L	W–L	PF	PA	EW	EL	BE	SE	LSD
Team St-Georges	4	1	1–0	39	24	24	18	3	9	254.4
Jolianne Fortin	4	1	0–1	48	22	24	16	1	8	209.2
Dominique Jean	3	2	1–0	31	41	21	23	1	5	554.3
Anne-Sophie Gionest	3	2	0–1	32	30	22	23	2	4	450.3
Myriam Arsenault	1	4	–	28	39	20	27	1	4	220.3
Valérie Tanguay	0	5	–	24	46	19	23	0	4	474.6

== Round robin results ==
All draw times are listed in Eastern Time (UTC-05:00).

=== Draw 1 ===
Sunday, January 4, 1:00 pm

Sheet B	1	2	3	4	5	6	7	8	9	10	Final
Dominique Jean 🔨	0	0	0	1	0	0	0	2	0	X	3
Team St-Georges	0	1	1	0	1	2	1	0	1	X	7

Sheet C	1	2	3	4	5	6	7	8	9	10	Final
Valérie Tanguay	0	0	2	0	0	1	0	1	0	X	4
Anne-Sophie Gionest 🔨	2	1	0	0	1	0	1	0	1	X	6

Sheet D	1	2	3	4	5	6	7	8	9	10	Final
Myriam Arsenault	0	0	0	1	1	0	0	1	0	X	3
Jolianne Fortin 🔨	2	2	2	0	0	2	1	0	2	X	11

=== Draw 2 ===
Monday, January 5, 8:15 am

Sheet A	1	2	3	4	5	6	7	8	9	10	Final
Jolianne Fortin 🔨	3	2	0	3	0	6	X	X	X	X	14
Dominique Jean	0	0	2	0	1	0	X	X	X	X	3

Sheet D	1	2	3	4	5	6	7	8	9	10	Final
Valérie Tanguay 🔨	1	0	0	1	1	0	0	X	X	X	3
Team St-Georges	0	3	1	0	0	5	3	X	X	X	12

Sheet E	1	2	3	4	5	6	7	8	9	10	Final
Myriam Arsenault 🔨	0	0	0	1	0	1	0	1	1	0	4
Anne-Sophie Gionest	1	0	2	0	2	0	1	0	0	1	7

=== Draw 3 ===
Monday, January 5, 4:00 pm

Sheet A	1	2	3	4	5	6	7	8	9	10	Final
Myriam Arsenault 🔨	5	1	0	2	0	0	0	1	0	X	9
Valérie Tanguay	0	0	1	0	1	1	1	0	1	X	5

Sheet C	1	2	3	4	5	6	7	8	9	10	Final
Team St-Georges	0	2	1	1	0	2	0	0	0	0	6
Jolianne Fortin 🔨	1	0	0	0	2	0	1	0	1	0	5

Sheet D	1	2	3	4	5	6	7	8	9	10	11	Final
Anne-Sophie Gionest 🔨	0	1	0	2	0	0	3	0	0	1	0	7
Dominique Jean	0	0	1	0	3	1	0	1	1	0	1	8

=== Draw 4 ===
Tuesday, January 6, 8:15 am

Sheet A	1	2	3	4	5	6	7	8	9	10	Final
Anne-Sophie Gionest	0	0	2	0	2	0	1	0	1	2	8
Team St-Georges 🔨	1	1	0	2	0	1	0	1	0	0	6

Sheet B	1	2	3	4	5	6	7	8	9	10	Final
Valérie Tanguay 🔨	1	0	0	2	0	1	0	2	0	X	6
Jolianne Fortin	0	1	1	0	2	0	3	0	3	X	10

Sheet C	1	2	3	4	5	6	7	8	9	10	11	Final
Dominique Jean	1	0	2	0	1	0	2	1	0	0	1	8
Myriam Arsenault 🔨	0	2	0	2	0	1	0	0	1	1	0	7

=== Draw 5 ===
Tuesday, January 6, 4:00 pm

Sheet B	1	2	3	4	5	6	7	8	9	10	Final
Team St-Georges	2	0	0	2	0	1	0	2	0	1	8
Myriam Arsenault 🔨	0	1	0	0	1	0	1	0	2	0	5

Sheet D	1	2	3	4	5	6	7	8	9	10	Final
Jolianne Fortin 🔨	0	1	0	1	1	1	0	4	0	X	8
Anne-Sophie Gionest	0	0	2	0	0	0	1	0	1	X	4

Sheet E	1	2	3	4	5	6	7	8	9	10	Final
Dominique Jean 🔨	1	0	2	1	0	0	2	0	3	X	9
Valérie Tanguay	0	1	0	0	1	1	0	3	0	X	6

== Playoffs ==
Semifinal			Final
			1	Team St-Georges	6
2	Jolianne Fortin	10	2	Jolianne Fortin	8
3	Dominique Jean	2

=== Semifinal ===
Wednesday, January 7, 12:15 pm

Sheet B	1	2	3	4	5	6	7	8	9	10	Final
Jolianne Fortin 🔨	2	0	2	0	2	2	1	1	X	X	10
Dominique Jean	0	1	0	1	0	0	0	0	X	X	2

=== Final ===
Wednesday, January 7, 7:30 pm

Sheet B	1	2	3	4	5	6	7	8	9	10	Final
Team St-Georges	0	1	0	2	0	1	1	0	1	0	6
Jolianne Fortin 🔨	2	0	0	0	2	0	0	2	0	2	8

2026 Quebec Women's Curling Championship

Jolianne Fortin
1st Quebec Provincial Championship title
