= Brenda Nicholls =

Canadian curler

- Curler
- Born: August 9, 1972 (age 54); Quebec City, Quebec

Team
- Curling club: CC Etchemin, Saint-Romuald, QC
- Skip: Lauren Mann
- Third: Brenda Nicholls
- Second: Stephanie Barbeau
- Lead: Pamela Nugent
- Mixed doubles partner: Dan deWaard

Curling career
- Member Association: Quebec
- Hearts: 7 (1996, 2005, 2007, 2010, 2012, 2015, 2016)
- Top CTRS ranking: 9th (2003-04)

Brenda Nicholls (born August 9, 1972 in Quebec City, Quebec) is a Canadian curler. She currently plays third on Team Lauren Mann.

== Career ==
=== 1991–1999 ===
Nicholls made her national curling debut at the 1991 Canadian Junior Curling Championships. She was playing fourth stones for skip Katie Arsenault. The team would finish 6-5 in round robin play. Nicholls would not return to a national championship until 1996, when her team skipped by Stephanie Marchand, earned the right to represent Quebec at the 1996 Scott Tournament of Hearts. The team would only finish round robin with a 4-7 record.

=== 2000–2011 ===
Nine years after making her first Scott appearance, Nicholls would get the chance to represent Quebec at the 2005 Scott Tournament of Hearts, this time skipping her own team. She would fail to improve on her previous record, finish round robin with a 4-7 record. Nicholls would return to the national scene at the 2007 Scotties Tournament of Hearts, this time as a fifth for Chantal Osborne. The Osborne team would finish round robin with a 4-7 record. After teaming up with Quebec skip Ève Bélisle, Nicholls would once again earn the chance to represent Quebec at the 2010 Scotties Tournament of Hearts. This time playing third, the team would finish round robin with a 5-6 record.

=== 2012–2017 ===
After Bélisle decided to take time away from curling, Nicholls would join forces with Marie-France Larouche. Playing third for Larouche, the team would win the 2012 Quebec Scotties Tournament of Hearts, earning the right to represent Quebec at the 2012 Scotties Tournament of Hearts. The team would find late success at the event winning five games in a row, finishing round robin with a 7-4 record and earning spot in the playoffs. They faced Alberta's Heather Nedohin in the 3-4 game, where they lost 4-7. They would play in the bronze medal game against Manitoba's Jennifer Jones, where they would lose 6-8.

Team Larouche did not curl competitively from 2013 to 2015. In the meantime, Nicholls was named as the alternate for Quebec (skipped by Lauren Mann) at the 2015 Scotties Tournament of Hearts.

Larouche and Nicholls teamed up with a new front end in 2015, and went on to win the 2016 Quebec Scotties Tournament of Hearts. The team represented Quebec at the 2016 Scotties Tournament of Hearts, finishing with a 5-6 record.

=== 2017-present ===
While not curling on the tour, Team Larouche made a run at the 2018 Quebec Scotties Tournament of Hearts, but lost in the semifinals to the eventual winners, the upstart Émilia Gagné rink.

In 2019, Nicholls won the Quebec Mixed Championship with skip Jean-Sébastien Roy. The team went on to win the 2020 Canadian Mixed Curling Championship.

== Personal life ==
Nicholls is employed as a customer service manager at EXFO. She has a common law husband and one child.
