= Nancy Bélanger =

Canadian curler

- Curler
- Born: September 2, 1978 (age 48); Sainte-Foy, Quebec

Team
- Curling club: CC Etchemin, Saint-Romuald, QC
- Skip: Marie-France Larouche
- Third: Brenda Nicholls
- Second: Nancy Bélanger
- Lead: Julie Rainville
- Alternate: Valérie Grenier

Curling career
- Hearts: 4 (2001, 2004, 2008, 2009)
Medal record
Curling
Scotties Tournament of Hearts
Silver medal – second place	2004 Red Deer
Bronze medal – third place	2009 Victoria
World Junior Championships
Bronze medal – third place	1999 Östersund

Nancy Bélanger (born September 2, 1978) is a Canadian curler from Charny, Quebec.

Born in Sainte-Foy, Quebec, Bélanger plays third for Marie-France Larouche. As a member of Larouche's team, Bélanger won five straight junior provincial championships. In her last year of juniors in 1999, the team won the 1999 Canadian Junior Curling Championships followed by a bronze medal at the World Junior Curling Championships. In 2001, Bélanger won her first provincial women's championship with Larouche. She then left the team, only to come back for 2005–06 season. She left the team again in 2006-07 to play second for Brenda Nicholls. She came back for the 2007–08 season and won her second women's provincial championship in 2008.
