= Chantal Osborne =

Canadian curler

- Curler
- Born: June 17, 1966 (age 60); Ottawa, Ontario, Canada

Team
- Curling club: Club de Curling Thurso, Thurso

Curling career
- Member Association: Quebec
- Hearts: 5 (1992, 1993, 1994, 1997, 2007)
- Top CTRS ranking: N/A
- Grand Slam victories: 0

Chantal Osborne (born June 17, 1966) is a Canadian curler from Gatineau. She is a five time Scotties Tournament of Hearts participant.

== Career ==
=== 1992–2000 ===
Osborne made her debut in 1992 playing third for Agnes Charette, finishing 6-5 in round robin play. The team would return again in 1993 and would drop to the bottom of the standings with a 2-9 record. At the 1994 Scott Tournament of Hearts the Charette team would return, representing Quebec, this time with Osborne at the second position. They would improve their record over the previous year to 4-7, in round robin play. In 1997 Osbourne would return to the Scotties representing Quebec, this time skipping her own team. She would finish with a 5-6 record.

=== 2007–current ===
It would be ten years before Osborne would return to the Scotties, returning with a new team. They would finish round robin play with a 4-7 record. Osborne would then come shy of the Quebec Playdowns, at both the 2009 and 2010 competition, just missing the playoffs. At the 2011 Quebec Scotties Tournament of Hearts Osbourne would finish the round robin in first place, with a 7-2 record, but she would then lose the final game 7-8 to Marie-France Larouche.
