= Annie Lemay =

Canadian curler (born 1977)

- Curler
- Born: May 16, 1977 (age 49); Trois-Rivières, Quebec

Team
- Curling club: CC des Collines, Chelsea, QC

Curling career
- Hearts: 9 (1999, 2000, 2001, 2004, 2008, 2009, 2011, 2013, 2016)
- World Mixed Championship: 1 (2022)
- Top CTRS ranking: 3rd (2008-09)
Medal record
Curling
World Mixed Curling Championship
Gold medal – first place	2022 Aberdeen
Scotties Tournament of Hearts
Silver medal – second place	2004 Red Deer
Bronze medal – third place	2009 Victoria

Annie Lemay (born May 16, 1977) is a Canadian curler from Aylmer, Quebec.

== Career ==
Lemay has won eight provincial titles. At the 1999 and 2000 Tournament of Hearts, she played second for Janique Berthelot. In 2000, she moved to the Marie-France Larouche team to play as her second and won provincial titles with her in 2001, 2004, 2008, 2009 and 2016 as her second and as her third in 2011. In 2004, the team made it to the finals, losing to Colleen Jones. Lemay also played in the 2013 Hearts as the alternate for Quebec.

Lemay won the 2021 Canadian Mixed Curling Championship playing lead on Team Quebec, skipped by her husband, Jean-Michel Ménard. The rink went on to win the World Mixed Curling Championship for Canada, defeating host Scotland 7-4 in Aberdeen.

== Personal life ==
Lemay is married to 2006 Brier champion skip Jean-Michel Ménard. They have two children. Lemay is employed by the Canada Revenue Agency.
