= Marie-France Larouche =

Canadian curler

- Curler
- Born: June 5, 1980 (age 46); Lévis, Quebec

Team
- Curling club: CC Etchemin, Saint-Romuald, QC

Curling career
- Member Association: Quebec
- Hearts: 11 (2000, 2001, 2004, 2006, 2008, 2009, 2011, 2012, 2016, 2019, 2024)
- World Mixed Championship: 1 (2022)
- Top CTRS ranking: 3rd (2008-09)
- Grand Slam victories: 1 (2008 Sobeys Slam)
Medal record
Curling
Representing Quebec
Scotties Tournament of Hearts
Silver medal – second place	2004 Red Deer
Bronze medal – third place	2009 Victoria
Representing Canada
World Junior Championships
Bronze medal – third place	1999 Östersund
World Mixed Curling Championship
Gold medal – first place	2022 Aberdeen

Marie-France Larouche (born June 5, 1980, in Lévis, Quebec) is a retired Canadian curler. In 2022 she won the World Mixed Curling Championship playing third for skip Jean-Michel Ménard.

== Career ==
=== Juniors ===
Larouche made her first national debut at the 1995 Canadian Junior Curling Championships, where her team finished round robin with a first place record of 9–2. She would end up losing the semi-final to Ontario's Kirsten Harmark, claiming a bronze medal.

Larouche would return to the championship again in 1996, where her team finish 7–5 in round robin, in a four-way tie for third. She would end up losing the tiebreaker to Ontario's Denna Schell.

For a third consecutive year Larouche would return to the junior championships in 1997, again finishing in first place after round robin with a 10–2 record. She would face Nova Scotia's Meredith Doyle in the final, eventually taking home the silver medal, losing 2–4.

Making a fourth appearance at the junior's Larouche would again represent Quebec at the 1998 Canadian Juniors. Her team would finish round robin with a 5–7 record.

In her fifth consecutive, and final Canadian Junior Curling Championships, Larouche and her team would represent Quebec at the 1999 Canadian Juniors. The team would finish round robin with a 9-2 second place record. She would go on to play Saskatchewan's Stefanie Miller in the semi-final, where they would come out ahead, winning 6–3. Larouche would get a rematch of the 1997, playing Nova Scotia's Meredith Doyle. Larouche would finally break through, winning 9-2 and the junior championship title. At the 1999 World Junior Curling Championships, Larouche and her team would win the bronze medal for Canada.

=== 2000–2011 ===
In 2000 Larouche graduated into women's play, where she was asked to be the alternate for Janique Berthelot's team at the 2000 Scott Tournament of Hearts. The team would finish with a 4–7 record.

At the 2001 Scott Tournament of Hearts, Larouche would make her skipping debut at the women's level. She would finish in third place with a 7–4 record. The team however would lose the 3 vs. 4 game to Ontario's Sherry Middaugh. Larouche would also participate at the 2001 Canadian Olympic Curling Trials, finishing in last place with a 2–7 record.

Larouche was back again at the 2004 Scott Tournament of Hearts where she again finished round robin with an 8–3 record. Larouche would defeat Manitoba's Lois Fowler in the 3–4 game, and Middaugh in the semi-final. She would advance to the final where she would end up losing to team Canada's Colleen Jones.

Larouche would return to the Canadian Olympic Curling Trials in 2005, but would again finish last place with a 1–8 record.

Larouche would return to the Scott in 2006 as an alternate for Eve Bélisle. The team would finish 7–4, defeating Newfoundland's Heather Strong in a tiebreaker, before losing the 3–4 game to team Canada's Jennifer Jones.

Larouche won the 2008 Quebec Scotties qualifying her for the 2008 Scotties Tournament of Hearts. Larouche would finish round robin in third, with an 8–3 record, eventually losing the 3–4 game to Jennifer Jones.

The 2008–09 season would be the best for Larouche's team. Larouche won her first Grand Slam event, by winning the Sobey's Slam. The team then won the John Shea Insurance Canada Cup Qualifier in Ottawa, qualifying the team for the 2009 Canada Cup of Curling. At the Canada Cup, the team lost in the final to Shannon Kleibrink's rink. The team also won the 2009 Quebec Scotties Tournament of Hearts, earning them the right to represent Team Quebec at the 2009 Scotties Tournament of Hearts. The team would finish second place with a 7–4 record, losing the 1–2 game to British Columbia's Marla Mallett, and the semi-final once again to team Canada's Jennifer Jones. Larouche would get the opportunity to participate in the 2009 Road to the Roar Canadian Olympic Curling Pre-Trials, which was a qualifying event for the Olympic Trials. Larouche would end up losing the final qualifier to Amber Holland.

Larouche would qualify for the Scotties after winning the 2011 Quebec Scotties Tournament of Hearts, defeating Chantal Osborne in the final. At the 2011 Scotties Tournament of Hearts, and for the first time as a skip, did not qualify for the playoffs, finishing round robin with a 4–7 record.

=== 2012–current ===
In 2012, Larouche would win the 2012 Quebec Scotties Tournament of Hearts, and earned the right to represent Quebec at the 2012 Scotties Tournament of Hearts. Her team would start off slow, but after five straight wins, they would finish round robin with a 7–4 record. This was enough to clinch third place and a spot in the playoffs. They would face Alberta's Heather Nedohin in the 3–4 game, where they would lose 7-4. They would play in the bronze medal game against Manitoba's Jennifer Jones, where they would lose 8-6.

Larouche did not win another Quebec title until 2016. At the 2016 Scotties Tournament of Hearts, she led Quebec rink to a 5–6 record. Larouche has not won a Quebec title since, but was the team's alternate at the 2019 Scotties Tournament of Hearts.

Larouche won the 2021 Canadian Mixed Curling Championship with skip Jean-Michel Ménard. They went on to win the 2022 World Mixed Curling Championship in Aberdeen, Scotland.

== Personal life ==
Larouche is employed as physical education teacher. She has a partner and two children.

== Grand Slam record ==
Key
C	Champion
F	Lost in Final
SF	Lost in Semifinal
QF	Lost in Quarterfinals
R16	Lost in the round of 16
Q	Did not advance to playoffs
T2	Played in Tier 2 event
DNP	Did not participate in event
N/A	Not a Grand Slam event that season

Event	2006–07	2007–08	2008–09	2009–10	2010–11	2011–12	2012–13
Autumn Gold	DNP	DNP	DNP	DNP	DNP	DNP	DNP
Manitoba Lotteries	DNP	DNP	DNP	QF	DNP	DNP	Q
Colonial Square Ladies Classic	N/A	N/A	N/A	N/A	N/A	N/A	DNP
The Masters Grand Slam of Curling	N/A	N/A	N/A	N/A	N/A	N/A	
Players' Championships	DNP	DNP	Q	DNP	DNP	DNP	

=== Former events ===
Event	2006–07	2007–08	2008–09	2009–10	2010–11
Sobeys Slam	N/A	F	C	N/A	DNP
