= Saint-Romuald, Quebec =

Coordinates: 46°45′21″N 71°14′16″W

Saint-Romuald
- Former city
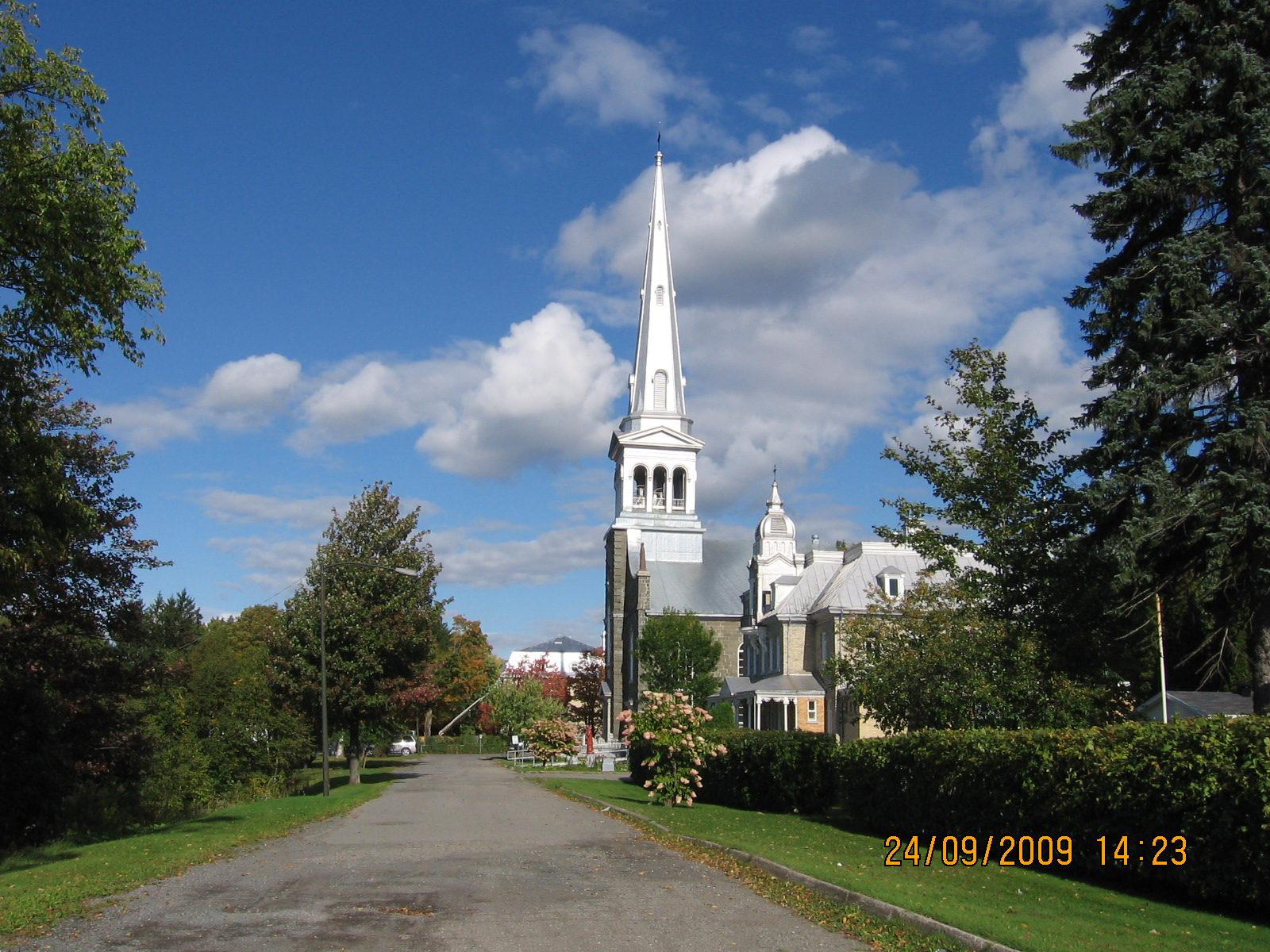
- Church
- Interactive map of Saint-Romuald
- Country: Canada
- Province: Quebec
- MRC: Lévis
- Established: 1903

Government
  - Type: Municipality
  - Mayor: François Caron

Area
  - Total: 17.16 km^{2} (6.63 sq mi)

Population (2006)^{[1]}
  - Total: 11,663
- Time zone: UTC-5 (EST)
  - Summer (DST): UTC-4 (EDT)

Saint-Romuald is a district within the Les Chutes-de-la-Chaudière-Est borough of Lévis, Quebec, Canada, located on the south shore of the Saint Lawrence River across from Quebec City. The district was formerly a town (Saint-Romuald d'Etchemin), but was amalgamated with Lévis on January 1, 2002.

The largest oil refinery in eastern Canada, owned by Valero Energy Corporation, is located in Saint-Romuald.

The Quebec Bridge connects Saint-Romuald to Sainte-Foy, a district of Quebec City.

The Etchemin River flows into the Saint Lawrence River at Saint-Romuald.

The district is named after a Roman Catholic parish, which is named in honour of Saint Romuald (c. 951–June 19, 1027), the founder of the Camaldolese order. The church is described as neo-classical in style and was built in 1855 by Joseph and Louis Larose.

In 1902, Cisterian nuns from Bonneval Abbey in Aveyron, France; founded a branch in Saint-Romuald, creating the Bon Conseil Abbey (French: Notre-Dame du Bon Conseil), where they made chocolate. In 2001, the abbey moved to Saint-Benoît-Labre.

According to the Canada 2006 Census:

- Population: 11,633
- % Change (2001–06): +7.3
- Dwellings: 5,568
- Area (km^{2}): 17.16 km^{2}
- Density (persons per km^{2}): 677.9

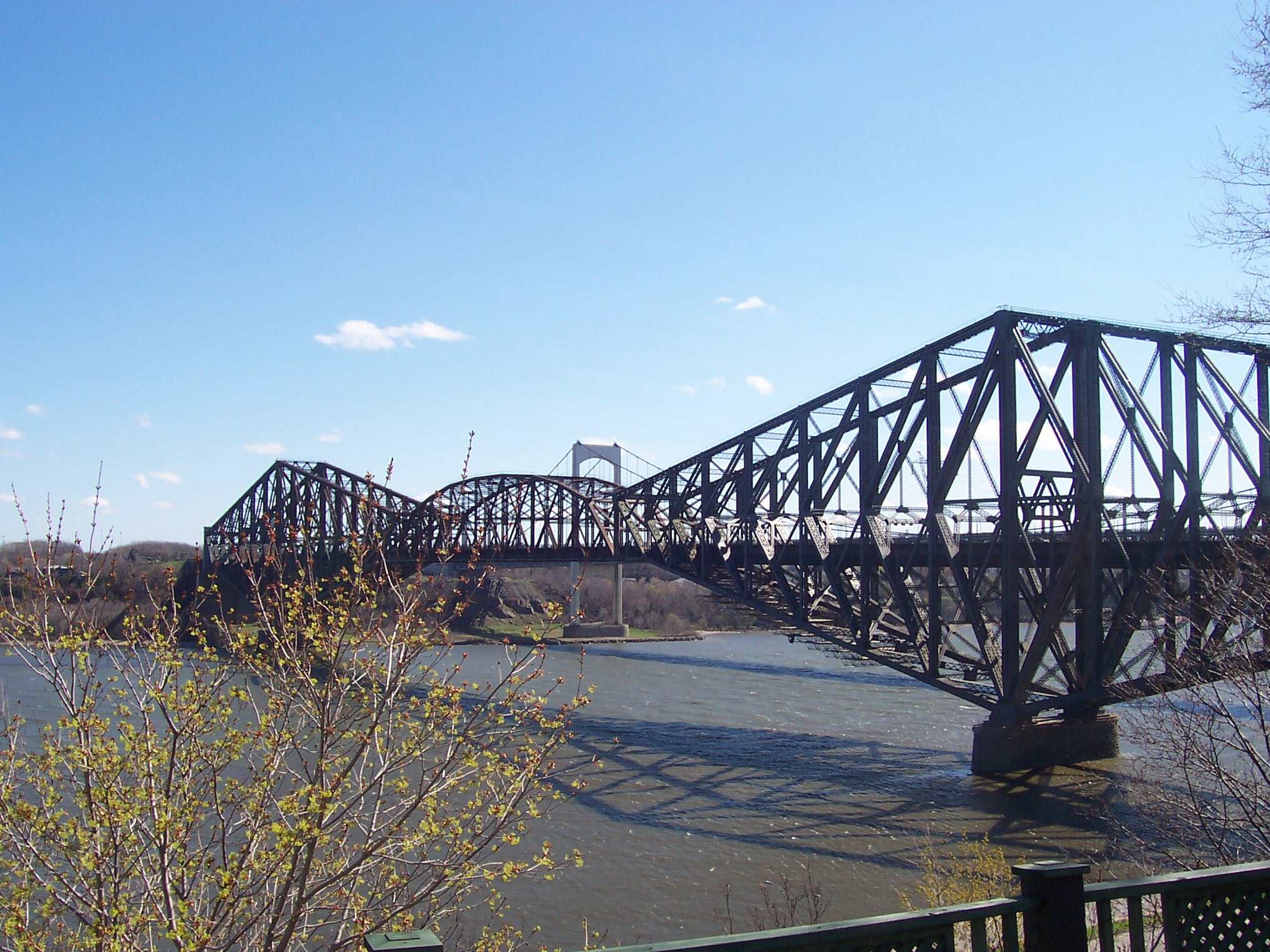
Québec Bridge

== Notable people ==
- Gérard Bolduc, founder of the Quebec International Pee-Wee Hockey Tournament
- Ariane Moffatt, singer-songwriter
