= 2011 Schmirler Curling Classic =

World Curling Tour event

- Host city: Regina, Saskatchewan
- Arena: Caledonian Curling Club
- Dates: September 23–26
- Winner: (Russia) Liudmila Privivkova
- Curling club: Moscow, Russia
- Skip: Liudmila Privivkova
- Third: Anna Sidorova
- Second: Nkeiruka Ezekh
- Lead: Ekaterina Galkina
- Finalist: (Saskatchewan) Jolene Campbell

The 2011 Schmirler Curling Classic was held from September 23 to 26 at the Caledonian Curling Club in Regina, Saskatchewan. The purse of the event was CAD$47,000, and the champion, Liudmila Privivkova won CAD$12,000.

== Teams ==
Skip	Third	Second	Lead	Locale
Brett Barber	Kailena Bay	Allison Cameron	Krista White	Saskatchewan
Penny Barker	Amanda Craigie	Danielle Sicinski	Tamara Haberstock	Moose Jaw, Saskatchewan
Cheryl Bernard	Susan O'Connor	Lori Olson-Johns	Jennifer Sadleir	Calgary, Alberta
Brandee Borne	Kara Kilden	Andrea Rudulier	Jen Buettner	Saskatoon, Saskatchewan
Erika Brown	Debbie McCormick	Ann Swisshelm	Jessica Schultz	Madison, Wisconsin
Jolene Campbell	Melissa Hoffman	Maegan Clark	Michelle McIvor	Humboldt, Saskatchewan
Chelsea Carey	Kristy McDonald	Kristen Foster	Lindsay Titheridge	Morden, Manitoba
Deanna Doig	Colleen Ackerman	Carla Sawicki	Carla Anaka	Regina, Saskatchewan
Tanilla Doyle	Lindsay Amudsen-Meyer	Janice Bailey	Christina Faulkner	Calgary, Alberta
Chantelle Eberle	Nancy Inglis	Debbie Lozinski	Susan Hoffart	Regina, Saskatchewan
Michelle Englot	Lana Vey	Roberta Materi	Sarah Slywka	Regina, Saskatchewan
Janet Harvey	Cherie-Ann Loder	Kristin Loder	Carey Kirby	Winnipeg, Manitoba
Amber Holland	Kim Schneider	Tammy Schneider	Heather Kalenchuk	Kronau, Saskatchewan
Patti Lank	Nina Spatola	Caitlin Maroldo	Mackenzie Lank	(New York (state)) Lewiston, New York
Brooklyn Lemon	Shelby Hubick	Kari Paulsen	Jessica Hanson	Saskatoon, Saskatchewan
Nancy Martin	Sharla Kruger	Terri Clark		Saskatchewan
Sherry Middaugh	Jo-Ann Rizzo	Lee Merklinger	Leigh Armstrong	Coldwater, Ontario
Sherrilee Orsted	Candace Newkirk	Stephanie Barnstable	Kristen Schlamp	Saskatchewan
Cathy Overton-Clapham	Jenna Loder	Ashley Howard	Breanne Meakin	Winnipeg, Manitoba
Desirée Owen	Cary-Anne Sallows	Lindsay Makichuk	Stephanie Malekoff	Grande Prairie, Alberta
Trish Paulsen	Kari Kennedy	Sarah Collin	Tessa Ruetz	Saskatoon, Saskatchewan
Liudmila Privivkova	Anna Sidorova	Nkeiruka Ezekh	Ekaterina Galkina	Moscow, Russia
Darcy Robertson	Calleen Neufeld	Vanessa Foster	Michelle Kruk	Winnipeg, Manitoba
Lorraine Schneider	Tessa Vibe	Callan Hamon	Ashley Desjardins	Saskatchewan
Kelly Scott	Dailene Sivertson	Sasha Carter	Jacquie Armstrong	Kelowna, British Columbia
Robyn Silvernagle	Kelsey Dutton	Dayna Demmans	Cristina Goertzen	Meadow Lake, Saskatchewan
Barb Spencer	Karen Klein	Ainsley Champagne	Raunora Westcott	Winnipeg, Manitoba
Jill Thurston	Kerri Einarson	Kendra Georges	Sarah Wazney	Winnipeg, Manitoba
Alex Williamson	Ashley Williamson	Rae Ann Williamson	Morgan Burns	Saskatchewan
Olga Zyablikova	Ekaterina Antonova	Victorya Moiseeva	Galina Arsenkina	Moscow, Russia

== Round robin standings ==
Key
Teams to Playoffs
Teams to Tiebreakers

Pool A	W	L
(Saskatchewan) Chantelle Eberle	4	1
(Alberta) Tanilla Doyle	3	2
(Saskatchewan) Amber Holland	3	2
(New York (state)) Patti Lank	2	3
(Manitoba) Darcy Robertson	2	3
(Saskatchewan) Alex Williamson	1	4

Pool B	W	L
(Manitoba) Chelsea Carey	4	1
(Saskatchewan) Michelle Englot	3	2
(Manitoba) Janet Harvey	3	2
(Saskatchewan) Sherrilee Orsted	3	2
(Saskatchewan) Brooklyn Lemon	1	4
(Alberta) Desirée Owen	1	4

Pool C	W	L
(Ontario) Sherry Middaugh	4	1
(Saskatchewan) Deanna Doig	3	2
(Saskatchewan) Nancy Martin	3	2
(Saskatchewan) Brandee Borne	2	3
(Wisconsin) Erika Brown	2	3
(Manitoba) Jill Thurston	1	4

Pool D	W	L
(Manitoba) Cathy Overton-Clapham	4	1
(Saskatchewan) Jolene Campbell	3	2
(Saskatchewan) Trish Paulsen	3	2
(British Columbia) Kelly Scott	3	2
(Russia) Olga Zyablikova	2	3
(Saskatchewan) Penny Barker	0	5

Pool E	W	L
(Alberta) Cheryl Bernard	4	1
(Russia) Liudmila Privivkova	3	2
(Saskatchewan) Robyn Silvernagle	3	2
(Manitoba) Barb Spencer	3	2
(Saskatchewan) Brett Barber	2	3
(Saskatchewan) Lorraine Schneider	0	5

== Playoffs ==
Quarterfinals
(Manitoba) Chelsea Carey	4
(Alberta) Cheryl Bernard	7
(Ontario) Sherry Middaugh	2
(Russia) Liudmila Privivkova	6
(Saskatchewan) Chantelle Eberle	6
(Saskatchewan) Jolene Campbell	8
(Manitoba) Janet Harvey	5
(Manitoba) Cathy Overton-Clapham	3

Semifinals
(Alberta) Cheryl Bernard	5
(Russia) Liudmila Privivkova	6
(Saskatchewan) Jolene Campbell	7
(Manitoba) Janet Harvey	0

Final
(Russia) Liudmila Privivkova	7
(Saskatchewan) Jolene Campbell	2
