= Schmirler Curling Classic =

Former World Curling Tour event

The Schmirler Curling Classic was an annual women's curling tournament held in Regina, Saskatchewan. The tournament ran from 2004 to 2011, in honour of the late Sandra Schmirler. It is part of the Women's World Curling Tour. It was suspended in 2012 due to lack of sponsorship.

== Event names ==
- 2004: SaskPower Schmirler Classic
- 2005: SaskPower Schmirler Charity Curling Classic
- 2006, 2007: CUETS Schmirler Charity Classic
- 2008: CUETS Schmirler Charity Curling Classic
- 2009-10: Schmirler Curling Classic presented by Bank of America

== Past champions ==
Year	Winning team	Runner up	Purse (CAD)
2004	(Alberta) Renée Sonnenberg, Nikki Smith, Twyla Bruce, Tina McDonald	(British Columbia) Kelly Scott, Jeanna Schraeder, Sasha Carter, Renee Simons.	42,000
2005	(Saskatchewan) Amber Holland, Kim Schneider, Tammy Schneider, Heather Seeley	(Alberta) Heather Rankin, Deanna Doig, Samantha Preston, Terri Clark	42,000
2006	(Alberta) Cathy King, Lori Olson, Raylene Rocque, Diane Dealy	(Saskatchewan) Sherry Anderson, Kim Hodson, Heather Walsh, Donna Gignac	30,000
2007	(Saskatchewan) Jolene McIvor, Sherry Linton, Allison Slupski, Marcia Gudereit	(Saskatchewan) Michelle Englot, Darlene Kidd, Roberta Materi, Cindy Simmons	30,000
2008	(Alberta) Shannon Kleibrink, Amy Nixon, Bronwen Webster, Chelsey Bell	(Ontario) Krista McCarville, Tara George, Kari MacLean-Kraft, Lorraine Lang	47,000
2009	(Saskatchewan) Amber Holland, Kim Schneider, Tammy Schneider, Heather Seeley	(British Columbia) Kelly Scott, Jeanna Schraeder, Sasha Carter, Jacquie Armstrong	47,000
2010	(Saskatchewan) Amber Holland, Kim Schneider, Tammy Schneider, Heather Kalenchuk	(Ontario) Sherry Middaugh, Jo-Ann Rizzo, Lee Merklinger, Leigh Armstrong	47,000
2011	(Russia) Liudmila Privivkova, Anna Sidorova, Nkeiruka Ezekh, Ekaterina Galkina	(Saskatchewan) Jolene Campbell, Melissa Hoffman, Maegan Clark, Michelle McIvor	47,000
