= 2010 Schmirler Curling Classic =

World Curling Tour event

2010 Schmirler Charity Curling Classic presented by Bank of America
- Host city: Regina, Saskatchewan
- Arena: Caledonian Curling Club
- Dates: Sept. 24–27, 2010
- Winner: Amber Holland
- Curling club: Kronau Curling Club, Kronau, Saskatchewan
- Skip: Amber Holland
- Third: Kim Schneider
- Second: Tammy Schneider
- Lead: Heather Kalenchuk
- Finalist: Sherry Middaugh

The 2010 Schmirler Curling Classic presented by Bank of America was held Sept. 24–27 at the Callie Curling Club in Regina, Saskatchewan. It was held on the second weekend of the Women's World Curling Tour of the 2010–11 curling season. The total purse of the event was $47,000 with $12,000 going to the winning team. Amber Holland went on to defeat Saskatchewan native Sherry Middaugh in the final.

== Teams ==
- (Saskatchewan) Brett Barber
- (United States) Erika Brown
- (Saskatchewan) Heather Burnett
- (Ontario) Chelsea Carey
- (Nova Scotia) Marie Christianson
- (Saskatchewan) Chantelle Eberle
- (Saskatchewan) Michelle Englot
- (Alberta) Lisa Eyamie
- (Manitoba) Kerri Flett
- (Manitoba) Janet Harvey
- (Saskatchewan) Amber Holland
- (Saskatchewan) Susan Lang
- (United States) Patti Lank
- (Saskatchewan) Stefanie Lawton
- (Saskatchewan) Brooklyn Lemon
- (Ontario) Sherry Middaugh
- (Alberta) Heather Nedohin
- (Prince Edward Island) Kathy O'Rourke
- (Saskatchewan) Sherrilee Orstead
- (Manitoba) Cathy Overton-Clapham
- (Saskatchewan) Trish Paulsen
- (Russia) Liudmila Privivkova
- (Saskatchewan) Cindy Ricci
- (Manitoba) Holly Scott
- (Saskatchewan) Mandy Selzer
- (Russia) Anna Sidorova
- (Saskatchewan) Robyn Silvernagle
- (Manitoba) Jill Thurston
- (China) Wang Bingyu
- (Alberta) Crystal Webster

== Draw ==
Group A	W	L
(Saskatchewan) Eberle	4	1
(Manitoba) Flett	4	1
(Manitoba) Overton-Clapham	3	2
(China) Wang	3	2
(Nova Scotia) Christianson	1	4
(Saskatchewan) Lemon	0	5

Group B	W	L
(Manitoba) Carey	4	1
(Alberta) Eyamie	4	1
(Saskatchewan) Lawton	4	1
(Russia) Privivkova	2	3
(Saskatchewan) Barber	1	4
(Saskatchewan) Silvernagle	0	5

Group C	W	L
(Saskatchewan) Holland	5	0
(Alberta) Nedohin	4	1
(United States) Lank	3	2
(Manitoba) Harvey	2	3
(Saskatchewan) Ricci	1	4
(Saskatchewan) Selzer	0	5

Group D	W	L
(Manitoba) Thurston	5	0
(Alberta) Webster	3	2
(United States) Brown	2	3
(Saskatchewan) Burnett	2	3
(Prince Edward Island) O'Rourke	2	3
(Saskatchewan) Paulsen	1	4

Group E	W	L
(Ontario) Middaugh	5	0
(Saskatchewan) Englot	3	2
(Saskatchewan) Orsted	3	2
(Manitoba) Scott	3	2
(Saskatchewan) Lang	1	4
(Russia) Sidorova	0	5

- Tie breaker: Carey 7-1 Flett

== Playoffs ==
Quarterfinals
(Saskatchewan) Holland	7
(Manitoba) Carey	4
(Saskatchewan) Lawton	5
(Saskatchewan) Eberle	6
(Alberta) Eyamie	6
(Manitoba) Thurston	3
(Alberta) Nedohin	5
(Ontario) Middaugh	7

Semifinals
(Saskatchewan) Holland	9
(Saskatchewan) Eberle	5
(Alberta) Eyamie	4
(Ontario) Middaugh	5

Finals
(Saskatchewan) Holland	11
(Ontario) Middaugh	6
