= 2009 Trail Appliances Curling Classic =

- Host city: Calgary, Alberta
- Arena: Calgary Curling Club
- Dates: October 9–12
- Winner: Jennifer Jones
- Curling club: St. Vital Curling Club, Winnipeg
- Skip: Jennifer Jones
- Third: Cathy Overton-Clapham
- Second: Jill Officer
- Lead: Dawn Askin
- Finalist: Wang Bingyu

The 2009 Trail Appliances Autumn Gold Curling Classic was held October 9–12 at the Calgary Curling Club in Calgary, Alberta. It was the first Grand Slam event of the 2009–10 Women's World Curling Tour.

The total purse of the event is $56,000 and the winning team received $14,000.

Jennifer Jones and her Winnipeg, Manitoba, rink won their second title, and fifth Grand Slam title. In the final, they defeated the Chinese national team, which was the first non-Canadian team to make it to a Grand Slam final in any event (men's or women's).

== Teams ==
Skip	Third	Second	Lead	Home city
Sherry Anderson	Kim Hodson	Heather Walsh	Donna Gignac	Delisle, Saskatchewan
Ève Bélisle	Brenda Nicholls	Martine Comeau	Julie Rainville	Montreal, Quebec
Cheryl Bernard	Susan O'Connor	Carolyn Darbyshire	Cori Bartel	Calgary, Alberta
June Campbell	Shannon Nimmo	Sheri Pickering	Donna Phillips	Calgary, Alberta
Chelsea Carey	Kari White	Kristen Foster	Lindsay Titheridge	Winnipeg, Manitoba
Michelle Englot	Deanna Doig	Roberta Materi	Cindy Simmons	Regina, Saskatchewan
Kerri Flett	Janice Blair	Susan Baleja	Alison Harvey	Winnipeg, Manitoba
Casey Scheidegger (fourth)	Kalynn Park	Diane Foster (skip)	Rachelle Pidherny	Lethbridge, Alberta
Kerry Galusha	Dawn Moses	Shona Barbour	Kalie Dobson	Yellowknife, Northwest Territories
Amber Holland	Kim Schneider	Tammy Schneider	Heather Seeley	Kronau, Saskatchewan
Madeleine Dupont (fourth)	Denise Dupont	Angelina Jensen (skip)	Camilla Jensen	Hvidovre, Denmark
Jennifer Jones	Cathy Overton-Clapham	Jill Officer	Dawn Askin	Winnipeg, Manitoba
Andrea Kelly	Denise Nowlan	Jillian Babin	Lianne Sobey	Fredericton, New Brunswick
Cathy King	Kaitlyn Lawes	Raylene Rocque	Tracy Bush	Edmonton, Alberta
Megan Kirk	Jodi Marthaller	Nicole Bawel	Lace Dupont	Lethbridge, Alberta
Shannon Kleibrink	Amy Nixon	Bronwen Webster	Chelsey Bell	Calgary, Alberta
Stefanie Lawton	Marliese Kasner	Sherri Singler	Lana Vey	Saskatoon, Saskatchewan
Marla Mallett	Grace MacInnes	Diane Gushulak	Jacalyn Brown	Vancouver, British Columbia
Moe Meguro	Mari Motohashi	Mayo Yamaura	Kotomi Ishizaki	Aomori, Japan
Sherry Middaugh	Kirsten Wall	Kim Moore	Andra Harmark	Coldwater, Ontario
Jill Mouzar	Heather Smith-Dacey	Blisse Comstock	Teri Lake	Halifax, Nova Scotia
Heather Nedohin	Beth Iskiw	Jessica Mair	Pam Appelman	Edmonton, Alberta
Mirjam Ott	Carmen Schäfer	Carmen Küng	Janine Greiner	Laax, Switzerland
Ludmila Privivkova	Olga Jarkova	Nkeiruka Ezekh	Ekaterina Galkina	Moscow, Russia
Heather Rankin	Lisa Eyamie	Heather Jensen	Kyla MacLachlan	Calgary, Alberta
Bobbie Sauder	Kara Johnston-Newsted	Jennifer Guzzwell	Marie Miller	Edmonton, Alberta
Holly Scott	Tara Scott	Jasmine Bracken	Jenna Scott	Winnipeg, Manitoba
Kelly Scott	Jeanna Schraeder	Sasha Carter	Jacquie Armstrong	Kelowna, British Columbia
Barb Spencer	Darcy Robertson	Vanessa Foster	Barb Enright	Winnipeg, Manitoba
Wang Bingyu	Liu Yin	Yue Qingshuang	Zhou Yan	Harbin, China
Crystal Webster	Lori Olson-Johns	Samantha Preston	Stephanie Malekoff	Calgary, Alberta
Georgina Wheatcroft	Stephanie Jackson	Sarah Wark	Kristen Windsor	New Westminster, British Columbia

== Results ==
=== A Event ===
Round of 16
(British Columbia) Georgina Wheatcroft	7
(British Columbia) Marla Mallett	5
(Manitoba) Kerri Flett	3
(Switzerland) Mirjam Ott	4
(Alberta) Cathy King	3
(Manitoba) Barb Spencer	5
(Nova Scotia) Jill Mouzar	6
(Alberta) Cheryl Bernard	7
(Manitoba) Holly Scott	5
(Alberta) Heather Rankin	7
(Alberta) Bobbie Sauder	6
(Ontario) Sherry Middaugh	5
(Russia) Liudmila Privivkova	5
(Denmark) Angelina Jensen	4
(Alberta) Megan Kirk	7
(Manitoba) Jennifer Jones	4

Quarterfinals
(British Columbia) Georgina Wheatcroft	6
(Switzerland) Mirjam Ott	8
(Alberta) Barb Spencer	2
(Alberta) Cheryl Bernard	7
(Alberta) Heather Rankin	3
(Alberta) Bobbie Sauder	5
(Russia) Liudmila Privivkova	3
(Alberta) Megan Kirk	4

Semifinals
(Switzerland) Mirjam Ott	5
(Alberta) Cheryl Bernard	6
(Alberta) Bobbie Sauder	8
(Alberta) Megan Kirk	6

Qualifier 1
(Alberta) Cheryl Bernard	7
(Alberta) Bobbie Sauder	1

Round of 16
(Manitoba) Chelsea Carey	10
(Alberta) Crystal Webster	2
(Alberta) Diane Foster	5
(Saskatchewan) Stefanie Lawton	4
(Alberta) Heather Nedohin	0
(Saskatchewan) Amber Holland	6
(Northwest Territories) Kerry Galusha	7
(China) Wang Bingyu	6
(Japan) Moe Meguro	1
(British Columbia) Kelly Scott	8
(New Brunswick) Andrea Kelly	5
(Saskatchewan) Michelle Englot	4
(Saskatchewan) Sherry Anderson	6
(Quebec) Ève Bélisle	7
(Alberta) June Campbell	2
(Alberta) Shannon Kleibrink	6

Quarterfinals
(Manitoba) Chelsea Carey	6
(Alberta) Diane Foster	7
(Saskatchewan) Amber Holland	7
(Northwest Territories) Kerry Galusha	5
(British Columbia) Kelly Scott	4
(New Brunswick) Andrea Kelly	5
(Quebec) Ève Bélisle	6
(Alberta) Shannon Kleibrink	5

Semifinals
(Alberta) Diane Foster	1
(Saskatchewan) Amber Holland	7
(New Brunswick) Andrea Kelly	2
(Quebec) Ève Bélisle	4

Qualifier 2
(Saskatchewan) Amber Holland	5
(Quebec) Ève Bélisle	6

=== B Event ===
Round of 16
(British Columbia) Marla Mallett	1
(Manitoba) Kerri Flett	9
(Nova Scotia) Jill Mouzar	6
(Alberta) Cathy King	5

Quarterfinals
(Alberta) Shannon Kleibrink	2
(Manitoba) Kerri Flett	8
(British Columbia) Kelly Scott	9
(Nova Scotia) Jill Mouzar	1

Semifinals
(Manitoba) Kerri Flett	7
(Alberta) Diane Foster	4
(British Columbia) Kelly Scott	3
(Alberta) Megan Kirk	8

Finals
(Manitoba) Kerri Flett	6
(Alberta) Megan Kirk	4

Round of 16
(Manitoba) Holly Scott	4
(Ontario) Sherry Middaugh	9
(Denmark) Angelina Jensen	1
(Manitoba) Jennifer Jones	8

Quarterfinals
(Northwest Territories) Kerry Galusha	2
(Ontario) Sherry Middaugh	7
(Manitoba) Chelsea Carey	2
(Manitoba) Jennifer Jones	8

Semifinals
(Ontario) Sherry Middaugh	6
(Manitoba) Jennifer Jones	5

Finals
(Ontario) Sherry Middaugh	7
(Alberta) Bobbie Sauder	4
Qualifier 3
(Manitoba) Kerri Flett	8
(Ontario) Sherry Middaugh	7

Round of 16
(Alberta) Crystal Webster	6
(Saskatchewan) Stefanie Lawton	5
(Alberta) Heather Nedohin	5
(China) Wang Bingyu	7

Quarterfinals
(Russia) Liudmila Privivkova	2
(Alberta) Crystal Webster	5
(Alberta) Heather Rankin	5
(China) Wang Bingyu	6

Semifinals
(Alberta) Crystal Webster	4
(New Brunswick) Andrea Kelly	3
(China) Wang Bingyu	7
(Switzerland) Mirjam Ott	5

Finals
(Alberta) Crystal Webster	5
(China) Wang Bingyu	4

Round of 16
(Japan) Moe Meguro	8
(Saskatchewan) Michelle Englot	4
(Saskatchewan) Sherry Anderson	4
(Alberta) June Campbell	7

Quarterfinals
(Manitoba) Barb Spencer	6
(Japan) Moe Meguro	5
(British Columbia) Georgina Wheatcroft	7
(Alberta) June Campbell	3

Semifinals
(Manitoba) Barb Spencer	3
(British Columbia) Georgina Wheatcroft	4

Finals
(British Columbia) Georgina Wheatcroft	2
(Saskatchewan) Amber Holland	7
Qualifier 4
(Alberta) Crystal Webster	3
(Saskatchewan) Amber Holland	5

=== C Event ===
Round of 16
(British Columbia) Marla Mallett	5
(Alberta) Cathy King	10
(Manitoba) Holly Scott	3
(Denmark) Angelina Jensen	4

Quarterfinals
(New Brunswick) Andrea Kelly	2
(Alberta) Cathy King	5
(Switzerland) Mirjam Ott	6
(Denmark) Angelina Jensen	1

Semifinals
(Alberta) Cathy King	8
(Switzerland) Mirjam Ott	6

Qualifier 5
(Alberta) Cathy King	7
(Ontario) Sherry Middaugh	5

Round of 16
(Northwest Territories) Kerry Galusha	3
(Manitoba) Chelsea Carey	7

Quarterfinals
(Alberta) Shannon Kleibrink	7
(Nova Scotia) Jill Mouzar	2
(Manitoba) Barb Spencer	5
(Manitoba) Chelsea Carey	3

Semifinals
(Alberta) Shannon Kleibrink	6
(British Columbia) Georgina Wheatcroft	2
(Manitoba) Barb Spencer	4
(China) Wang Bingyu	6

Qualifier 6
(Alberta) Shannon Kleibrink	3
(China) Wang Bingyu	8

Round of 16
(Japan) Moe Meguro	6
(Alberta) June Campbell	3

Quarterfinals
(Manitoba) Jennifer Jones	6
(Japan) Moe Meguro	4
(Russia) Liudmila Privivkova	5
(Alberta) Heather Rankin	4

Semifinals
(Manitoba) Jennifer Jones	6
(Alberta) Megan Kirk	4
(Russia) Liudmila Privivkova	10
(Alberta) Bobbie Sauder	8

Qualifier 7
(Manitoba) Jennifer Jones	5
(Russia) Liudmila Privivkova	4

Round of 16
(Saskatchewan) Stefanie Lawton	8
(Alberta) Heather Nedohin	2
(Saskatchewan) Michelle Englot	4
(Saskatchewan) Sherry Anderson	7

Quarterfinals
(Alberta) Diane Foster	4
(Saskatchewan) Stefanie Lawton	7
(British Columbia) Kelly Scott	5
(Saskatchewan) Sherry Anderson	7

Semifinals
(Saskatchewan) Stefanie Lawton	7
(Saskatchewan) Sherry Anderson	4

Qualifier 8
(Saskatchewan) Stefanie Lawton	5
(Alberta) Crystal Webster	4

=== Playoffs ===
Quarterfinals
(Alberta) Cheryl Bernard	1
(China) Wang Bingyu	6
(Saskatchewan) Amber Holland	3
(Alberta) Cathy King	6
(Quebec) Ève Bélisle	2
(Manitoba) Jennifer Jones	4
(Manitoba) Kerri Flett	6
(Saskatchewan) Stefanie Lawton	5

Semifinals
(China) Wang Bingyu	8
(Alberta) Cathy King	3
(Manitoba) Jennifer Jones	6
(Manitoba) Kerri Flett	4

Finals
(China) Wang Bingyu	4
(Manitoba) Jennifer Jones	7
