= 2010 Scotties Tournament of Hearts =

- Host city: Sault Ste. Marie, Ontario
- Arena: Essar Centre
- Dates: January 30-February 7
- Attendance: 49,436
- Winner: Team Canada
- Curling club: St. Vital CC, Winnipeg, Manitoba
- Skip: Jennifer Jones
- Third: Cathy Overton-Clapham
- Second: Jill Officer
- Lead: Dawn Askin
- Alternate: Jennifer Clark-Rouire
- Coach: Janet Arnott
- Finalist: Prince Edward Island (Kathy O'Rourke)

The 2010 Scotties Tournament of Hearts, the Canadian women's national curling championship, was held from January 30 to February 7 at the Essar Centre in Sault Ste. Marie, Ontario.

The event was described as having a weaker field than normal, as many of the usual provincial champions did not qualify. The event featured only two teams that have won the Scotties before: Jennifer Jones who qualified as last year's champion, and Kelly Scott of British Columbia. Making her first trip to the Scotties as a skip is Saskatchewan's Amber Holland, who won the 2008 Players' Championships. Ontario will be represented by Krista McCarville who won a bronze medal at the 2009 Canadian Olympic Curling Trials. Making their second trips to the Scotties as skips are Quebec's Ève Bélisle, and Nova Scotia's Nancy McConnery. New Brunswick will be represented by former Canadian Junior champion Andrea Kelly who is making her third appearance at the event. Newfoundland and Labrador will be represented former Canadian Mixed Champion Shelley Nichols, while P.E.I. will also be represented by a Canadian Mixed champion in Kathy O'Rourke. Making their debuts as skips are Alberta's Val Sweeting, Manitoba's Jill Thurston and the Territories' Sharon Cormier.

== Teams ==
The teams were listed as follows:

| Team Canada | Alberta | British Columbia |
|---|---|---|
| St. Vital CC, Winnipeg Skip: Jennifer Jones; Third: Cathy Overton-Clapham; Second: Jill Officer; Lead: Dawn Askin; Alternate: Jennifer Clark-Rouire | Saville SC, Edmonton Skip: Val Sweeting; Third: Megan Einarson; Second: Whitney More; Lead: Lindsay Makichuk; Alternate: Leslie Rogers | Kelowna CC, Kelowna Skip: Kelly Scott; Third: Jeanna Schraeder; Second: Sasha Carter; Lead: Jacquie Armstrong; Alternate: Shannon Aleksic |
| Manitoba | New Brunswick | Newfoundland and Labrador |
| Deer Lodge CC, Winnipeg Skip: Jill Thurston; Third: Kirsten Phillips; Second: Leslie Wilson; Lead: Raunora Westcott; Alternate: Kendra Georges | Capital WC, Fredericton Skip: Andrea Kelly; Third: Denise Nowlan; Second: Jillian Babin; Lead: Lianne Sobey; Alternate: Jodie DeSolla | St. John's CC, St. John's Skip: Shelley Nichols; Third: Stephanie LeDrew; Second: Rhonda Rogers; Lead: Colette Lemon; Alternate: Michelle Jewer |
| Nova Scotia | Ontario | Prince Edward Island |
| Dartmouth CC, Dartmouth Skip: Nancy McConnery; Third: Jennifer Crouse; Second: Sheena Gilman; Lead: Jill Thomas; Alternate: Carole MacLean | Fort William Curling Club, Thunder Bay Skip: Krista McCarville; Third: Tara George; Second: Ashley Miharija; Lead: Kari MacLean; Alternate: Sarah Lang | Charlottetown CC, Charlottetown Fourth: Erin Carmody; Third: Geri-Lynn Ramsay; Skip: Kathy O'Rourke; Lead: Tricia Affleck; Alternate: Shelly Bradley |
| Quebec | Saskatchewan | Northwest Territories/Yukon |
| TMR CC, Mount Royal; CC Etchemin, Saint-Romuald Skip: Ève Bélisle; Third: Brenda Nicholls; Second: Martine Comeau; Lead: Julie Rainville; Alternate: France Charette | Kronau CC, Kronau Skip: Amber Holland; Third: Kim Schneider; Second: Tammy Schneider; Lead: Heather Kalenchuk; Alternate: Jolene Campbell | Yellowknife CC, Yellowknife Skip: Sharon Cormier; Third: Tara Naugler; Second: Megan Cormier; Lead: Danielle Ellis; Alternate: Dawn Moses |

== Map of teams ==
Team Canada Provincial Winners

== Round robin standings ==
Final Round Robin standings

Key
| Teams to Playoffs |
| Teams to Tiebreaker |

| Locale | Skip | W | L | W–L | PF | PA | EW | EL | BE | SE | S% |
|---|---|---|---|---|---|---|---|---|---|---|---|
| Prince Edward Island | Kathy O'Rourke | 8 | 3 | 1–0 | 79 | 73 | 47 | 43 | 10 | 16 | 76% |
| Canada | Jennifer Jones | 8 | 3 | 0–1 | 80 | 66 | 46 | 45 | 8 | 11 | 84% |
| British Columbia | Kelly Scott | 7 | 4 | 1–1 (Note: British Columbia won the tiebreaker over both Ontario and Manitoba by virtue of a pre-event draw challenge since head-to-head results were not able to break the tie.) | 76 | 60 | 52 | 46 | 7 | 15 | 79% |
| Manitoba | Jill Thurston | 7 | 4 | 1–1 | 84 | 68 | 53 | 45 | 5 | 22 | 76% |
| Ontario | Krista McCarville | 7 | 4 | 1–1 | 80 | 61 | 43 | 45 | 9 | 12 | 74% |
| Saskatchewan | Amber Holland | 6 | 5 | – | 64 | 71 | 47 | 55 | 14 | 12 | 75% |
| Quebec | Ève Bélisle | 5 | 6 | 1–0 | 64 | 71 | 43 | 45 | 10 | 9 | 79% |
| New Brunswick | Andrea Kelly | 5 | 6 | 0–1 | 72 | 75 | 43 | 46 | 12 | 7 | 75% |
| Alberta | Val Sweeting | 4 | 7 | 1–1 | 67 | 76 | 42 | 47 | 8 | 9 | 71% |
| Northwest Territories/Yukon | Sharon Cormier | 4 | 7 | 1–1 | 72 | 75 | 50 | 49 | 7 | 14 | 70% |
| Newfoundland and Labrador | Shelley Nichols | 4 | 7 | 1–1 | 73 | 77 | 45 | 46 | 5 | 19 | 68% |
| Nova Scotia | Nancy McConnery | 1 | 10 | – | 53 | 84 | 40 | 52 | 9 | 8 | 71% |

== Round Robin results ==
All draw times are listed in Eastern Time (UTC−05:00).

=== Draw 1 ===
Saturday, January 30, 3:00 pm

| Sheet A | 1 | 2 | 3 | 4 | 5 | 6 | 7 | 8 | 9 | 10 | Final |
|---|---|---|---|---|---|---|---|---|---|---|---|
| Prince Edward Island (O'Rourke) | 0 | 0 | 0 | 1 | 1 | 2 | 2 | 1 | 3 | X | 10 |
| Saskatchewan (Holland)🔨 | 0 | 1 | 2 | 0 | 0 | 0 | 0 | 0 | 0 | X | 3 |

| Sheet B | 1 | 2 | 3 | 4 | 5 | 6 | 7 | 8 | 9 | 10 | Final |
|---|---|---|---|---|---|---|---|---|---|---|---|
| Northwest Territories/Yukon (Cormier) | 0 | 1 | 0 | 1 | 0 | 0 | 0 | X | X | X | 2 |
| Newfoundland and Labrador (Nichols) 🔨 | 2 | 0 | 4 | 0 | 1 | 4 | 1 | X | X | X | 12 |

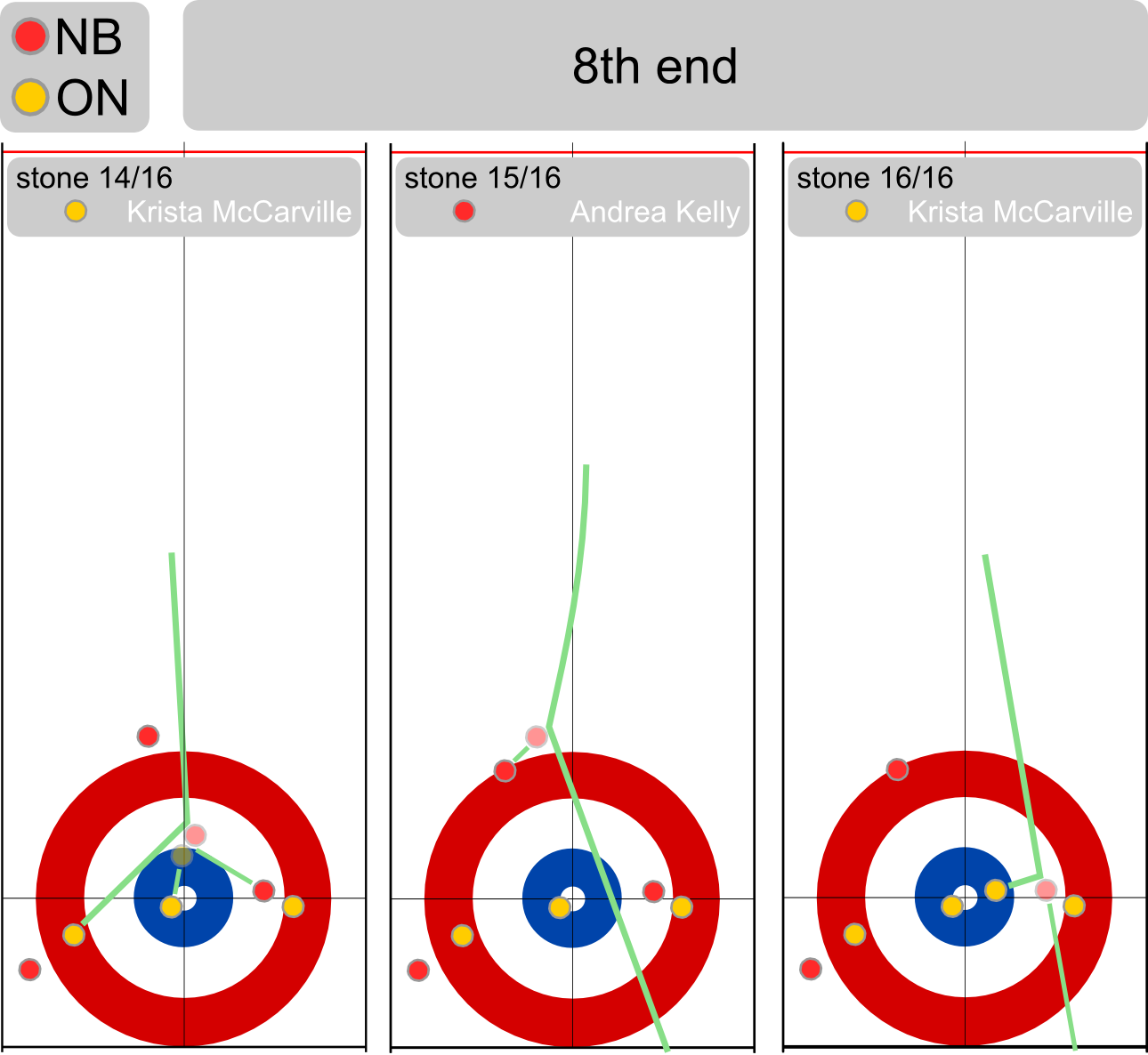

| Sheet C | 1 | 2 | 3 | 4 | 5 | 6 | 7 | 8 | 9 | 10 | Final |
|---|---|---|---|---|---|---|---|---|---|---|---|
| New Brunswick (Kelly) | 0 | 0 | 0 | 1 | 0 | 0 | 1 | 0 | X | X | 2 |
| Ontario (McCarville) 🔨 | 0 | 2 | 1 | 0 | 1 | 1 | 0 | 4 | X | X | 9 |

| Sheet D | 1 | 2 | 3 | 4 | 5 | 6 | 7 | 8 | 9 | 10 | 11 | Final |
|---|---|---|---|---|---|---|---|---|---|---|---|---|
| Quebec (Bélisle) | 0 | 1 | 0 | 0 | 1 | 0 | 0 | 2 | 0 | 2 | 2 | 8 |
| Nova Scotia (McConnery)🔨 | 1 | 0 | 1 | 1 | 0 | 1 | 1 | 0 | 1 | 0 | 0 | 6 |

=== Draw 2 ===
Saturday, January 30, 7:30 pm

| Sheet A | 1 | 2 | 3 | 4 | 5 | 6 | 7 | 8 | 9 | 10 | Final |
|---|---|---|---|---|---|---|---|---|---|---|---|
| Nova Scotia (McConnery) 🔨 | 0 | 0 | 0 | 0 | 0 | 2 | 0 | X | X | X | 2 |
| Northwest Territories/Yukon (Cormier) | 1 | 1 | 1 | 3 | 1 | 0 | 1 | X | X | X | 8 |

| Sheet B | 1 | 2 | 3 | 4 | 5 | 6 | 7 | 8 | 9 | 10 | Final |
|---|---|---|---|---|---|---|---|---|---|---|---|
| Manitoba (Thurston) 🔨 | 0 | 2 | 0 | 0 | 1 | 0 | 2 | 0 | 0 | X | 5 |
| Canada (Jones) | 0 | 0 | 1 | 3 | 0 | 2 | 0 | 1 | 3 | X | 10 |

| Sheet C | 1 | 2 | 3 | 4 | 5 | 6 | 7 | 8 | 9 | 10 | Final |
|---|---|---|---|---|---|---|---|---|---|---|---|
| British Columbia (Scott) 🔨 | 1 | 0 | 0 | 0 | 0 | 0 | 0 | 3 | 0 | 1 | 5 |
| Alberta (Sweeting) | 0 | 0 | 1 | 1 | 0 | 2 | 1 | 0 | 1 | 0 | 6 |

| Sheet D | 1 | 2 | 3 | 4 | 5 | 6 | 7 | 8 | 9 | 10 | Final |
|---|---|---|---|---|---|---|---|---|---|---|---|
| New Brunswick (Kelly) 🔨 | 0 | 3 | 1 | 0 | 3 | 0 | 1 | 0 | 0 | X | 8 |
| Prince Edward Island (O'Rourke) | 3 | 0 | 0 | 2 | 0 | 3 | 0 | 1 | 2 | X | 11 |

=== Draw 3 ===
Sunday, January 31, 10:30 am

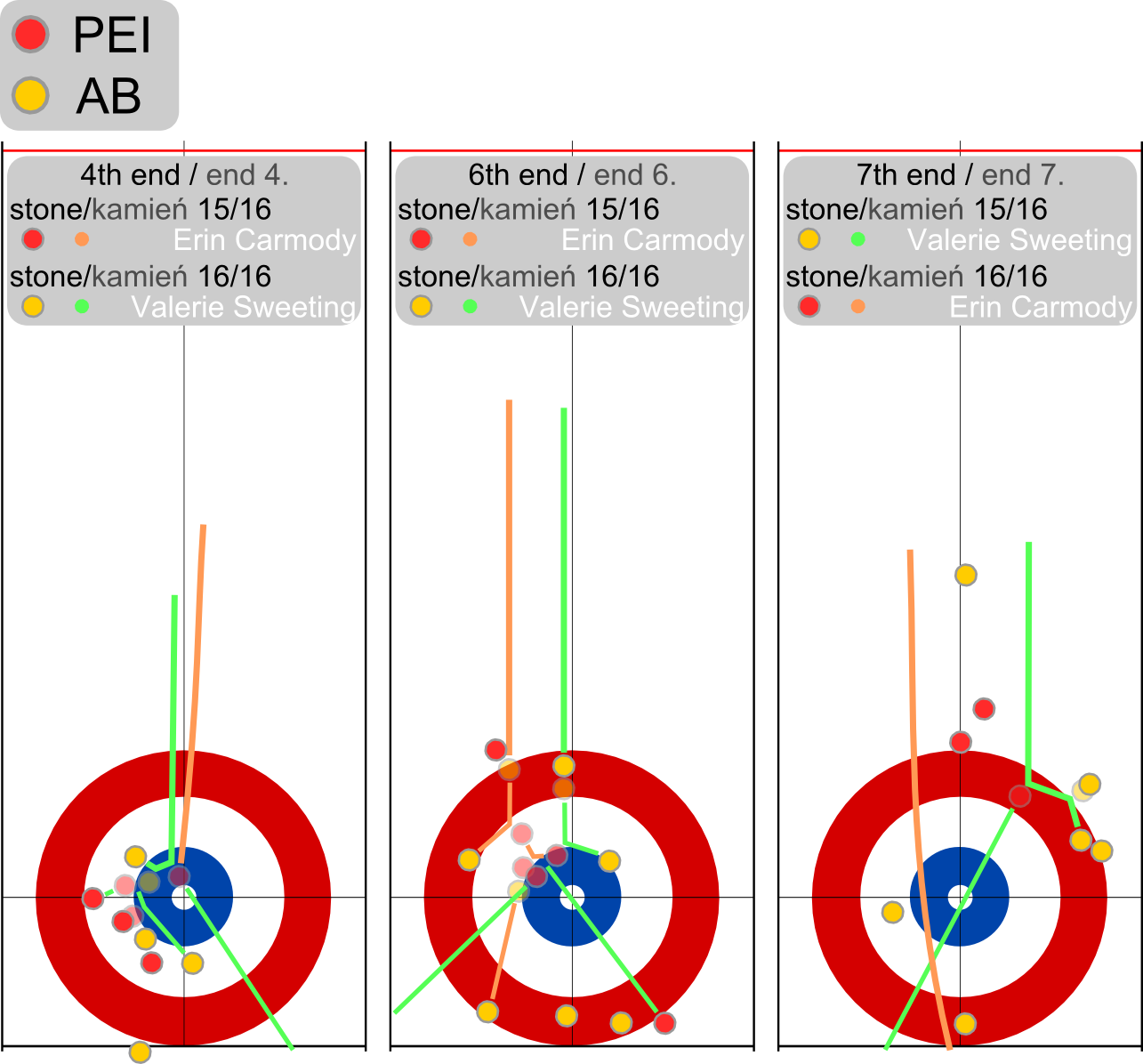

| Sheet A | 1 | 2 | 3 | 4 | 5 | 6 | 7 | 8 | 9 | 10 | Final |
|---|---|---|---|---|---|---|---|---|---|---|---|
| Canada (Jones)🔨 | 0 | 0 | 0 | 0 | 0 | 4 | 0 | 1 | 0 | X | 5 |
| New Brunswick (Kelly) | 1 | 0 | 0 | 0 | 1 | 0 | 1 | 0 | 1 | X | 4 |

| Sheet B | 1 | 2 | 3 | 4 | 5 | 6 | 7 | 8 | 9 | 10 | Final |
|---|---|---|---|---|---|---|---|---|---|---|---|
| Prince Edward Island (O'Rourke) | 0 | 0 | 1 | 0 | 1 | 0 | 0 | X | X | X | 2 |
| Alberta (Sweeting) 🔨 | 1 | 0 | 0 | 2 | 0 | 6 | 4 | X | X | X | 13 |

| Sheet C | 1 | 2 | 3 | 4 | 5 | 6 | 7 | 8 | 9 | 10 | Final |
|---|---|---|---|---|---|---|---|---|---|---|---|
| Nova Scotia (McConnery)🔨 | 0 | 1 | 0 | 0 | 0 | 1 | 0 | 1 | X | X | 3 |
| Manitoba (Thurston) | 1 | 0 | 1 | 1 | 2 | 0 | 2 | 0 | X | X | 7 |

| Sheet D | 1 | 2 | 3 | 4 | 5 | 6 | 7 | 8 | 9 | 10 | Final |
|---|---|---|---|---|---|---|---|---|---|---|---|
| Northwest Territories/Yukon (Cormier) | 0 | 0 | 1 | 0 | 1 | 0 | 0 | 2 | 1 | 1 | 6 |
| British Columbia (Scott)🔨 | 1 | 1 | 0 | 3 | 0 | 0 | 2 | 0 | 0 | 0 | 7 |

=== Draw 4 ===
Sunday, January 31, 3:00 pm

| Sheet A | 1 | 2 | 3 | 4 | 5 | 6 | 7 | 8 | 9 | 10 | Final |
|---|---|---|---|---|---|---|---|---|---|---|---|
| Manitoba (Thurston) | 0 | 3 | 0 | 1 | 1 | 0 | 4 | 0 | 2 | X | 11 |
| Newfoundland and Labrador (Nichols) 🔨 | 2 | 0 | 1 | 0 | 0 | 1 | 0 | 2 | 0 | X | 6 |

| Sheet B | 1 | 2 | 3 | 4 | 5 | 6 | 7 | 8 | 9 | 10 | Final |
|---|---|---|---|---|---|---|---|---|---|---|---|
| Quebec (Bélisle)🔨 | 0 | 0 | 1 | 1 | 0 | 1 | 0 | 0 | 1 | 0 | 4 |
| British Columbia (Scott) | 0 | 0 | 0 | 0 | 2 | 0 | 2 | 1 | 0 | 1 | 6 |

| Sheet C | 1 | 2 | 3 | 4 | 5 | 6 | 7 | 8 | 9 | 10 | Final |
|---|---|---|---|---|---|---|---|---|---|---|---|
| Canada (Jones) 🔨 | 0 | 1 | 0 | 2 | 0 | 0 | 2 | 0 | 2 | X | 7 |
| Saskatchewan (Holland) | 0 | 0 | 1 | 0 | 0 | 1 | 0 | 1 | 0 | X | 3 |

| Sheet D | 1 | 2 | 3 | 4 | 5 | 6 | 7 | 8 | 9 | 10 | Final |
|---|---|---|---|---|---|---|---|---|---|---|---|
| Ontario (McCarville)🔨 | 0 | 2 | 0 | 0 | 2 | 0 | 1 | 0 | 0 | 2 | 7 |
| Alberta (Sweeting) | 1 | 0 | 0 | 2 | 0 | 1 | 0 | 1 | 1 | 0 | 6 |

=== Draw 5 ===
Sunday, January 31, 7:30 pm

| Sheet A | 1 | 2 | 3 | 4 | 5 | 6 | 7 | 8 | 9 | 10 | Final |
|---|---|---|---|---|---|---|---|---|---|---|---|
| Ontario (McCarville) | 0 | 3 | 0 | 5 | 0 | 2 | 1 | 1 | X | X | 12 |
| Quebec (Bélisle) 🔨 | 2 | 0 | 2 | 0 | 2 | 0 | 0 | 0 | X | X | 6 |

| Sheet B | 1 | 2 | 3 | 4 | 5 | 6 | 7 | 8 | 9 | 10 | Final |
|---|---|---|---|---|---|---|---|---|---|---|---|
| New Brunswick (Kelly) 🔨 | 0 | 2 | 0 | 0 | 4 | 0 | 2 | 0 | 2 | X | 10 |
| Nova Scotia (McConnery) | 1 | 0 | 0 | 1 | 0 | 2 | 0 | 2 | 0 | X | 6 |

| Sheet C | 1 | 2 | 3 | 4 | 5 | 6 | 7 | 8 | 9 | 10 | Final |
|---|---|---|---|---|---|---|---|---|---|---|---|
| Prince Edward Island (O'Rourke) 🔨 | 0 | 1 | 0 | 2 | 1 | 0 | 0 | 3 | 0 | 3 | 10 |
| Northwest Territories/Yukon (Cormier) | 2 | 0 | 1 | 0 | 0 | 1 | 1 | 0 | 2 | 0 | 7 |

| Sheet D | 1 | 2 | 3 | 4 | 5 | 6 | 7 | 8 | 9 | 10 | Final |
|---|---|---|---|---|---|---|---|---|---|---|---|
| Saskatchewan (Holland) 🔨 | 0 | 1 | 0 | 2 | 0 | 0 | 2 | 1 | 1 | 1 | 8 |
| Newfoundland and Labrador (Nichols) | 0 | 0 | 2 | 0 | 1 | 2 | 0 | 0 | 0 | 0 | 5 |

=== Draw 6 ===
Monday, February 1, 10:30 am

| Sheet B | 1 | 2 | 3 | 4 | 5 | 6 | 7 | 8 | 9 | 10 | Final |
|---|---|---|---|---|---|---|---|---|---|---|---|
| Saskatchewan (Holland) 🔨 | 1 | 1 | 0 | 2 | 1 | 0 | 0 | 1 | 0 | 1 | 7 |
| Ontario (McCarville) | 0 | 0 | 1 | 0 | 0 | 1 | 3 | 0 | 1 | 0 | 6 |

| Sheet C | 1 | 2 | 3 | 4 | 5 | 6 | 7 | 8 | 9 | 10 | Final |
|---|---|---|---|---|---|---|---|---|---|---|---|
| Quebec (Bélisle) 🔨 | 2 | 0 | 0 | 2 | 1 | 0 | 3 | 1 | X | X | 9 |
| Newfoundland and Labrador (Nichols) | 0 | 0 | 2 | 0 | 0 | 1 | 0 | 0 | X | X | 3 |

=== Draw 7 ===
Monday, February 1, 3:00 pm

| Sheet A | 1 | 2 | 3 | 4 | 5 | 6 | 7 | 8 | 9 | 10 | Final |
|---|---|---|---|---|---|---|---|---|---|---|---|
| British Columbia (Scott) 🔨 | 1 | 3 | 0 | 0 | 1 | 1 | 0 | 2 | X | X | 8 |
| New Brunswick (Kelly) | 0 | 0 | 1 | 1 | 0 | 0 | 1 | 0 | X | X | 3 |

| Sheet B | 1 | 2 | 3 | 4 | 5 | 6 | 7 | 8 | 9 | 10 | Final |
|---|---|---|---|---|---|---|---|---|---|---|---|
| Canada (Jones) | 0 | 1 | 0 | 1 | 0 | 0 | 1 | 1 | 0 | X | 4 |
| Northwest Territories/Yukon (Cormier) 🔨 | 1 | 0 | 4 | 0 | 1 | 2 | 0 | 0 | 2 | X | 10 |

| Sheet C | 1 | 2 | 3 | 4 | 5 | 6 | 7 | 8 | 9 | 10 | Final |
|---|---|---|---|---|---|---|---|---|---|---|---|
| Alberta (Sweeting) | 1 | 0 | 0 | 2 | 0 | 2 | 0 | 2 | 0 | 1 | 8 |
| Nova Scotia (McConnery) 🔨 | 0 | 1 | 0 | 0 | 2 | 0 | 1 | 0 | 1 | 0 | 5 |

| Sheet D | 1 | 2 | 3 | 4 | 5 | 6 | 7 | 8 | 9 | 10 | Final |
|---|---|---|---|---|---|---|---|---|---|---|---|
| Manitoba (Thurston) | 0 | 0 | 1 | 0 | 1 | 0 | 0 | 2 | 2 | 0 | 6 |
| Prince Edward Island (O'Rourke) 🔨 | 0 | 1 | 0 | 0 | 0 | 1 | 2 | 0 | 0 | 3 | 7 |

=== Draw 8 ===
Monday, February 1, 7:30 pm

| Sheet A | 1 | 2 | 3 | 4 | 5 | 6 | 7 | 8 | 9 | 10 | Final |
|---|---|---|---|---|---|---|---|---|---|---|---|
| Newfoundland and Labrador (Nichols) | 1 | 0 | 0 | 2 | 2 | 1 | 1 | 1 | 0 | X | 8 |
| Canada (Jones) 🔨 | 0 | 2 | 1 | 0 | 0 | 0 | 0 | 0 | 1 | X | 4 |

| Sheet B | 1 | 2 | 3 | 4 | 5 | 6 | 7 | 8 | 9 | 10 | Final |
|---|---|---|---|---|---|---|---|---|---|---|---|
| Alberta (Sweeting) | 0 | 0 | 0 | 0 | 0 | 1 | 0 | X | X | X | 1 |
| Quebec (Bélisle) 🔨 | 0 | 2 | 0 | 1 | 1 | 0 | 5 | X | X | X | 9 |

| Sheet C | 1 | 2 | 3 | 4 | 5 | 6 | 7 | 8 | 9 | 10 | 11 | Final |
|---|---|---|---|---|---|---|---|---|---|---|---|---|
| Saskatchewan (Holland) | 0 | 0 | 0 | 1 | 1 | 0 | 0 | 2 | 1 | 2 | 0 | 7 |
| Manitoba (Thurston) 🔨 | 0 | 2 | 0 | 0 | 0 | 2 | 3 | 0 | 0 | 0 | 2 | 9 |

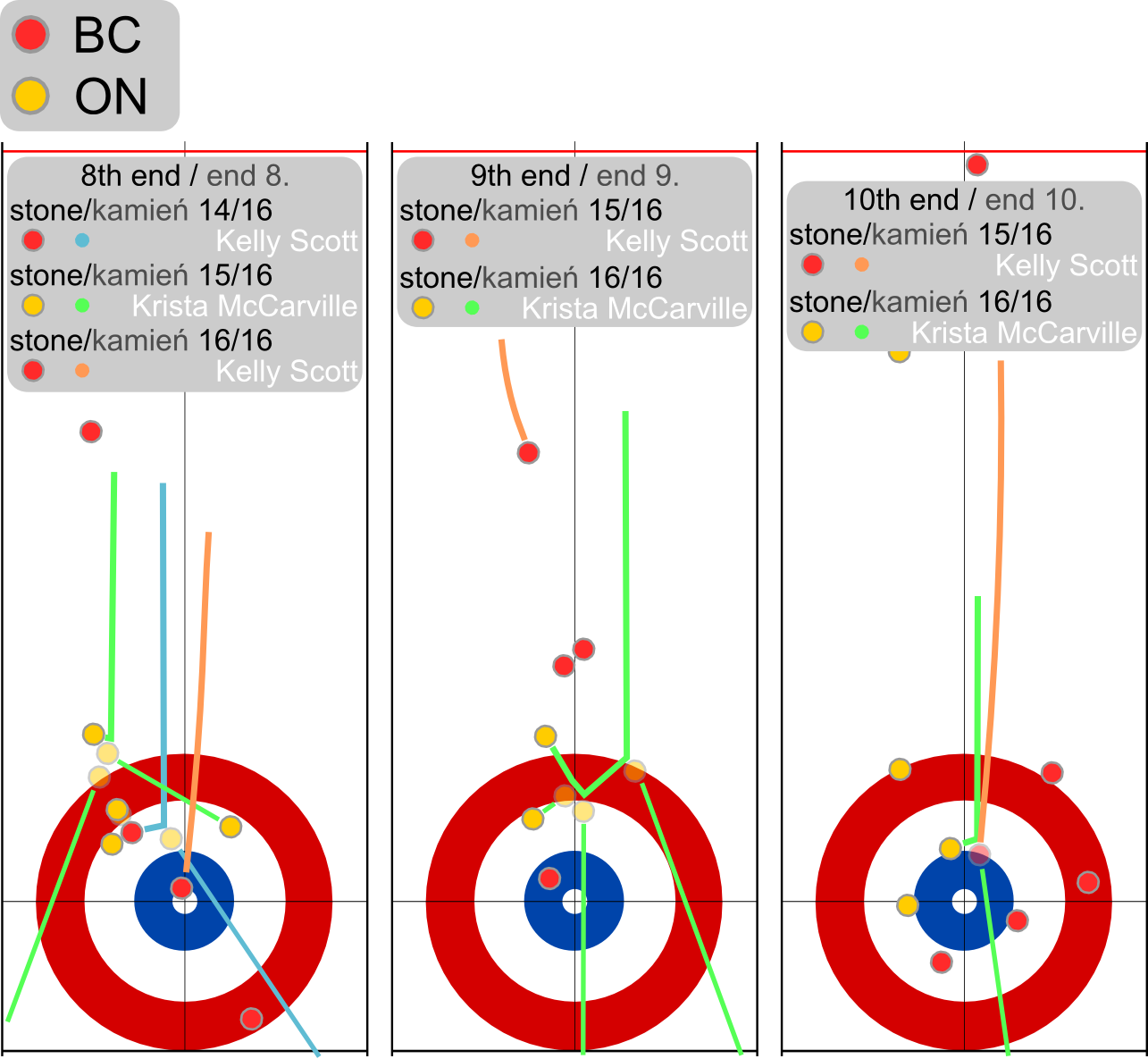

| Sheet D | 1 | 2 | 3 | 4 | 5 | 6 | 7 | 8 | 9 | 10 | Final |
|---|---|---|---|---|---|---|---|---|---|---|---|
| British Columbia (Scott) 🔨 | 0 | 1 | 0 | 1 | 0 | 1 | 0 | 2 | 1 | 0 | 6 |
| Ontario (McCarville) | 1 | 0 | 2 | 0 | 1 | 0 | 1 | 0 | 0 | 2 | 7 |

=== Draw 9 ===
Tuesday, February 2, 10:30 am

| Sheet A | 1 | 2 | 3 | 4 | 5 | 6 | 7 | 8 | 9 | 10 | Final |
|---|---|---|---|---|---|---|---|---|---|---|---|
| Prince Edward Island (O'Rourke) 🔨 | 1 | 0 | 0 | 2 | 3 | 0 | 1 | 0 | 0 | X | 7 |
| Nova Scotia (McConnery) | 0 | 0 | 1 | 0 | 0 | 1 | 0 | 1 | 1 | X | 4 |

| Sheet B | 1 | 2 | 3 | 4 | 5 | 6 | 7 | 8 | 9 | 10 | Final |
|---|---|---|---|---|---|---|---|---|---|---|---|
| British Columbia (Scott) 🔨 | 0 | 1 | 0 | 2 | 1 | 0 | 1 | 0 | 1 | 1 | 7 |
| Manitoba (Thurston) | 1 | 0 | 1 | 0 | 0 | 2 | 0 | 1 | 0 | 0 | 5 |

| Sheet C | 1 | 2 | 3 | 4 | 5 | 6 | 7 | 8 | 9 | 10 | 11 | Final |
|---|---|---|---|---|---|---|---|---|---|---|---|---|
| Northwest Territories/Yukon (Cormier) | 0 | 2 | 1 | 0 | 0 | 0 | 1 | 0 | 0 | 1 | 0 | 5 |
| New Brunswick (Kelly) 🔨 | 1 | 0 | 0 | 2 | 0 | 1 | 0 | 1 | 0 | 0 | 2 | 7 |

| Sheet D | 1 | 2 | 3 | 4 | 5 | 6 | 7 | 8 | 9 | 10 | Final |
|---|---|---|---|---|---|---|---|---|---|---|---|
| Alberta (Sweeting) 🔨 | 2 | 0 | 0 | 0 | 1 | 2 | 0 | 1 | 1 | 0 | 7 |
| Canada (Jones) | 0 | 1 | 2 | 2 | 0 | 0 | 3 | 0 | 0 | 1 | 9 |

=== Draw 10 ===
Tuesday, February 2, 3:00 pm

| Sheet A | 1 | 2 | 3 | 4 | 5 | 6 | 7 | 8 | 9 | 10 | Final |
|---|---|---|---|---|---|---|---|---|---|---|---|
| Alberta (Sweeting) | 0 | 0 | 2 | 1 | 0 | 0 | 0 | 0 | 1 | X | 4 |
| Manitoba (Thurston) 🔨 | 1 | 1 | 0 | 0 | 1 | 2 | 1 | 1 | 0 | X | 7 |

| Sheet B | 1 | 2 | 3 | 4 | 5 | 6 | 7 | 8 | 9 | 10 | Final |
|---|---|---|---|---|---|---|---|---|---|---|---|
| Ontario (McCarville) 🔨 | 0 | 0 | 4 | 2 | 0 | 1 | 1 | 0 | 0 | X | 8 |
| Newfoundland and Labrador (Nichols) | 0 | 1 | 0 | 0 | 2 | 0 | 0 | 1 | 1 | X | 5 |

| Sheet C | 1 | 2 | 3 | 4 | 5 | 6 | 7 | 8 | 9 | 10 | Final |
|---|---|---|---|---|---|---|---|---|---|---|---|
| British Columbia (Scott) | 1 | 0 | 1 | 0 | 2 | 1 | 0 | 0 | 2 | 0 | 7 |
| Canada (Jones) 🔨 | 0 | 4 | 0 | 2 | 0 | 0 | 2 | 1 | 0 | 1 | 10 |

| Sheet D | 1 | 2 | 3 | 4 | 5 | 6 | 7 | 8 | 9 | 10 | Final |
|---|---|---|---|---|---|---|---|---|---|---|---|
| Quebec (Bélisle) | 0 | 0 | 2 | 0 | 2 | 0 | 1 | 0 | 0 | X | 5 |
| Saskatchewan (Holland) 🔨 | 0 | 1 | 0 | 3 | 0 | 1 | 0 | 1 | 2 | X | 8 |

=== Draw 11 ===
Tuesday, February 2, 7:30 pm

| Sheet A | 1 | 2 | 3 | 4 | 5 | 6 | 7 | 8 | 9 | 10 | Final |
|---|---|---|---|---|---|---|---|---|---|---|---|
| Quebec (Bélisle) 🔨 | 1 | 1 | 0 | 1 | 0 | 1 | 0 | 2 | 0 | 0 | 6 |
| Northwest Territories/Yukon (Cormier) | 0 | 0 | 2 | 0 | 1 | 0 | 1 | 0 | 1 | 0 | 5 |

| Sheet B | 1 | 2 | 3 | 4 | 5 | 6 | 7 | 8 | 9 | 10 | Final |
|---|---|---|---|---|---|---|---|---|---|---|---|
| New Brunswick (Kelly) | 0 | 0 | 2 | 0 | 0 | 2 | 1 | 2 | 0 | 1 | 8 |
| Saskatchewan (Holland) 🔨 | 3 | 0 | 0 | 1 | 2 | 0 | 0 | 0 | 1 | 0 | 7 |

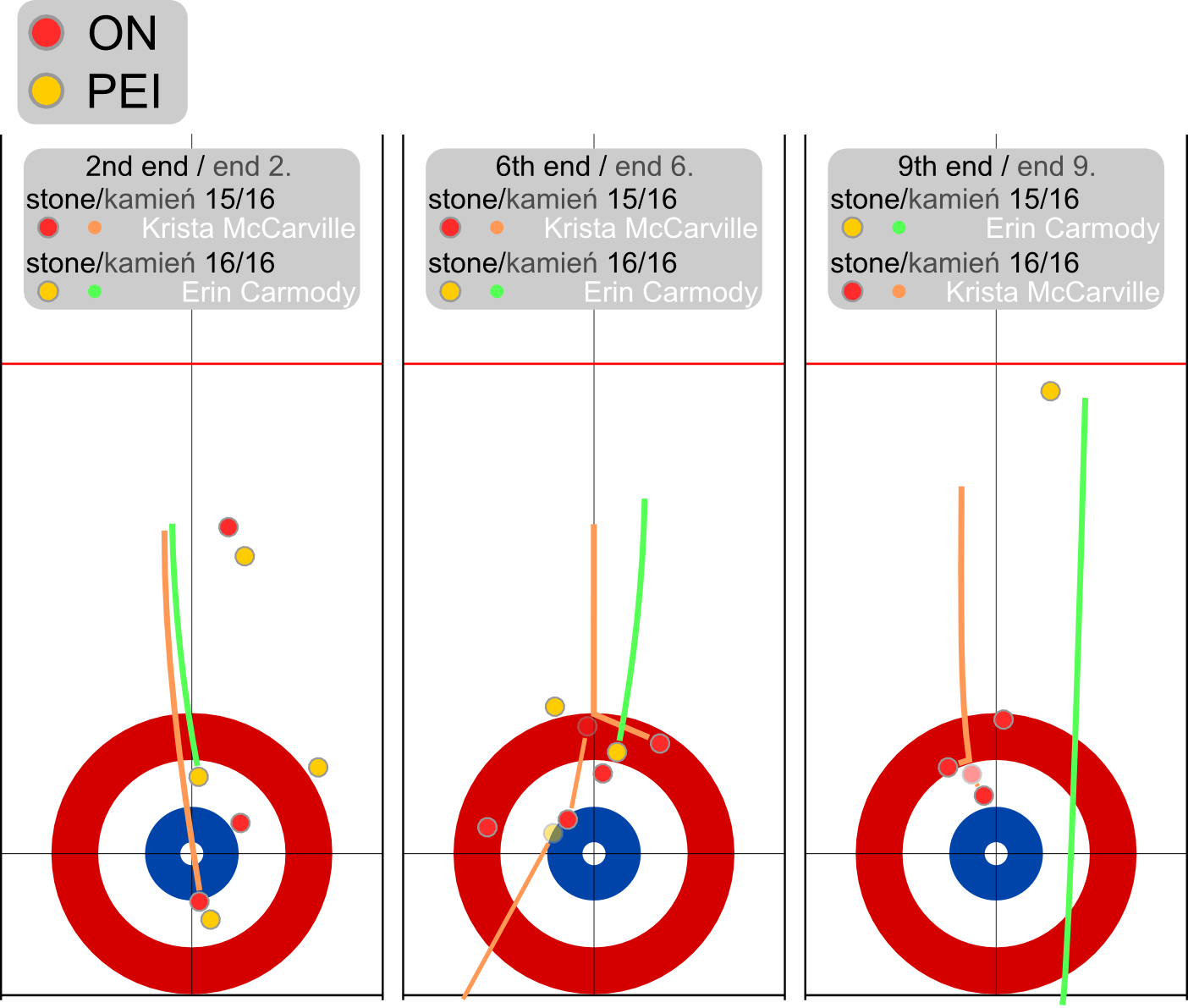

| Sheet C | 1 | 2 | 3 | 4 | 5 | 6 | 7 | 8 | 9 | 10 | Final |
|---|---|---|---|---|---|---|---|---|---|---|---|
| Ontario (McCarville) | 0 | 2 | 1 | 0 | 1 | 2 | 0 | 0 | 3 | X | 9 |
| Prince Edward Island (O'Rourke) 🔨 | 0 | 0 | 0 | 1 | 0 | 0 | 0 | 2 | 0 | X | 3 |

| Sheet D | 1 | 2 | 3 | 4 | 5 | 6 | 7 | 8 | 9 | 10 | Final |
|---|---|---|---|---|---|---|---|---|---|---|---|
| Nova Scotia (McConnery) | 0 | 0 | 0 | 3 | 1 | 0 | 1 | 0 | 1 | 1 | 7 |
| Newfoundland and Labrador (Nichols) 🔨 | 1 | 1 | 1 | 0 | 0 | 2 | 0 | 1 | 0 | 0 | 6 |

=== Draw 12 ===
Wednesday, February 3, 9:30 am

| Sheet A | 1 | 2 | 3 | 4 | 5 | 6 | 7 | 8 | 9 | 10 | Final |
|---|---|---|---|---|---|---|---|---|---|---|---|
| Saskatchewan (Holland) | 0 | 0 | 2 | 0 | 0 | 1 | 0 | 1 | 0 | 1 | 5 |
| British Columbia (Scott) 🔨 | 0 | 1 | 0 | 1 | 1 | 0 | 1 | 0 | 0 | 0 | 4 |

| Sheet B | 1 | 2 | 3 | 4 | 5 | 6 | 7 | 8 | 9 | 10 | Final |
|---|---|---|---|---|---|---|---|---|---|---|---|
| Quebec (Bélisle) | 0 | 2 | 0 | 0 | 1 | 1 | 0 | 0 | X | X | 4 |
| Canada (Jones) 🔨 | 4 | 0 | 1 | 2 | 0 | 0 | 1 | 1 | X | X | 9 |

| Sheet C | 1 | 2 | 3 | 4 | 5 | 6 | 7 | 8 | 9 | 10 | Final |
|---|---|---|---|---|---|---|---|---|---|---|---|
| Newfoundland and Labrador (Nichols) 🔨 | 3 | 0 | 2 | 0 | 4 | 1 | 1 | X | X | X | 11 |
| Alberta (Sweeting) | 0 | 2 | 0 | 2 | 0 | 0 | 0 | X | X | X | 4 |

| Sheet D | 1 | 2 | 3 | 4 | 5 | 6 | 7 | 8 | 9 | 10 | Final |
|---|---|---|---|---|---|---|---|---|---|---|---|
| Ontario (McCarville) 🔨 | 2 | 0 | 0 | 0 | 0 | 0 | 2 | 1 | 0 | X | 5 |
| Manitoba (Thurston) | 0 | 1 | 2 | 1 | 3 | 2 | 0 | 0 | 1 | X | 10 |

=== Draw 13 ===
Wednesday, February 3, 2:00 pm

| Sheet A | 1 | 2 | 3 | 4 | 5 | 6 | 7 | 8 | 9 | 10 | Final |
|---|---|---|---|---|---|---|---|---|---|---|---|
| New Brunswick (Kelly) 🔨 | 0 | 0 | 0 | 3 | 0 | 2 | 1 | 0 | 1 | 0 | 7 |
| Newfoundland and Labrador (Nichols) | 1 | 2 | 1 | 0 | 2 | 0 | 0 | 1 | 0 | 2 | 9 |

| Sheet B | 1 | 2 | 3 | 4 | 5 | 6 | 7 | 8 | 9 | 10 | Final |
|---|---|---|---|---|---|---|---|---|---|---|---|
| Northwest Territories/Yukon (Cormier) | 0 | 2 | 1 | 0 | 1 | 0 | 1 | 0 | 2 | X | 7 |
| Ontario (McCarville) 🔨 | 2 | 0 | 0 | 0 | 0 | 1 | 0 | 2 | 0 | X | 5 |

| Sheet C | 1 | 2 | 3 | 4 | 5 | 6 | 7 | 8 | 9 | 10 | Final |
|---|---|---|---|---|---|---|---|---|---|---|---|
| Nova Scotia (McConnery) | 0 | 0 | 0 | 1 | 0 | 0 | 1 | 0 | 0 | X | 2 |
| Saskatchewan (Holland) 🔨 | 0 | 0 | 2 | 0 | 2 | 0 | 0 | 0 | 1 | X | 5 |

| Sheet D | 1 | 2 | 3 | 4 | 5 | 6 | 7 | 8 | 9 | 10 | Final |
|---|---|---|---|---|---|---|---|---|---|---|---|
| Prince Edward Island (O'Rourke) | 1 | 0 | 0 | 2 | 0 | 1 | 1 | 1 | 0 | X | 6 |
| Quebec (Bélisle) 🔨 | 0 | 1 | 0 | 0 | 1 | 0 | 0 | 0 | 1 | X | 3 |

=== Draw 14 ===
Wednesday, February 3, 6:30 pm

| Sheet A | 1 | 2 | 3 | 4 | 5 | 6 | 7 | 8 | 9 | 10 | Final |
|---|---|---|---|---|---|---|---|---|---|---|---|
| Canada (Jones) 🔨 | 0 | 1 | 0 | 2 | 0 | 1 | 1 | 0 | 0 | 0 | 5 |
| Prince Edward Island (O'Rourke) | 0 | 0 | 1 | 0 | 2 | 0 | 0 | 2 | 2 | 2 | 9 |

| Sheet B | 1 | 2 | 3 | 4 | 5 | 6 | 7 | 8 | 9 | 10 | 11 | Final |
|---|---|---|---|---|---|---|---|---|---|---|---|---|
| Nova Scotia (McConnery) | 2 | 0 | 1 | 0 | 1 | 0 | 1 | 2 | 0 | 0 | 0 | 7 |
| British Columbia (Scott) 🔨 | 0 | 0 | 0 | 2 | 0 | 2 | 0 | 0 | 2 | 1 | 1 | 8 |

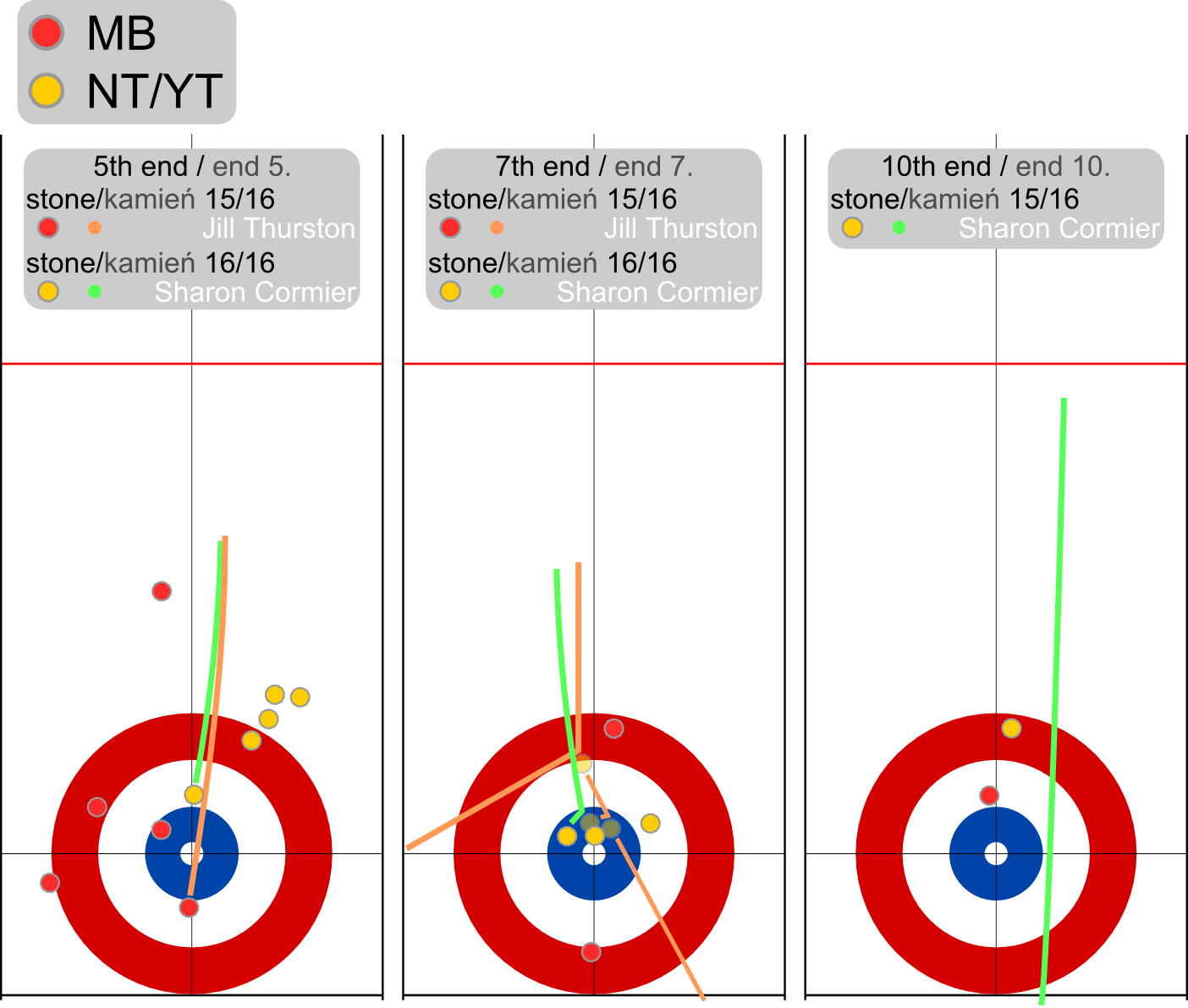

| Sheet C | 1 | 2 | 3 | 4 | 5 | 6 | 7 | 8 | 9 | 10 | Final |
|---|---|---|---|---|---|---|---|---|---|---|---|
| Manitoba (Thurston) 🔨 | 0 | 1 | 0 | 1 | 2 | 1 | 0 | 2 | 0 | 1 | 8 |
| Northwest Territories/Yukon (Cormier) | 1 | 0 | 1 | 0 | 0 | 0 | 3 | 0 | 1 | 0 | 6 |

| Sheet D | 1 | 2 | 3 | 4 | 5 | 6 | 7 | 8 | 9 | 10 | Final |
|---|---|---|---|---|---|---|---|---|---|---|---|
| Alberta (Sweeting) | 0 | 0 | 1 | 0 | 1 | 0 | 1 | 0 | 0 | X | 3 |
| New Brunswick (Kelly) 🔨 | 1 | 0 | 0 | 2 | 0 | 3 | 0 | 2 | 1 | X | 9 |

=== Draw 15 ===
Thursday, February 4, 10:30 am

| Sheet A | 1 | 2 | 3 | 4 | 5 | 6 | 7 | 8 | 9 | 10 | Final |
|---|---|---|---|---|---|---|---|---|---|---|---|
| Nova Scotia (McConnery) | 0 | 1 | 0 | 0 | 0 | 0 | 1 | 0 | 1 | X | 3 |
| Ontario (McCarville) 🔨 | 1 | 0 | 1 | 0 | 0 | 4 | 0 | 1 | 0 | X | 7 |

| Sheet B | 1 | 2 | 3 | 4 | 5 | 6 | 7 | 8 | 9 | 10 | Final |
|---|---|---|---|---|---|---|---|---|---|---|---|
| Newfoundland and Labrador (Nichols) | 0 | 0 | 1 | 0 | 2 | 1 | 0 | 0 | 1 | X | 5 |
| Prince Edward Island (O'Rourke) 🔨 | 3 | 1 | 0 | 3 | 0 | 0 | 0 | 2 | 0 | X | 9 |

| Sheet C | 1 | 2 | 3 | 4 | 5 | 6 | 7 | 8 | 9 | 10 | Final |
|---|---|---|---|---|---|---|---|---|---|---|---|
| New Brunswick (Kelly) | 0 | 0 | 0 | 0 | 1 | 0 | 3 | 0 | 1 | 0 | 5 |
| Quebec (Bélisle) 🔨 | 0 | 0 | 0 | 1 | 0 | 3 | 0 | 1 | 0 | 1 | 6 |

| Sheet D | 1 | 2 | 3 | 4 | 5 | 6 | 7 | 8 | 9 | 10 | Final |
|---|---|---|---|---|---|---|---|---|---|---|---|
| Saskatchewan (Holland) | 0 | 2 | 1 | 0 | 1 | 0 | 1 | 0 | 0 | X | 5 |
| Northwest Territories/Yukon (Cormier) 🔨 | 3 | 0 | 0 | 1 | 0 | 2 | 0 | 1 | 2 | X | 9 |

=== Draw 16 ===
Thursday, February 4, 3:00 pm

| Sheet A | 1 | 2 | 3 | 4 | 5 | 6 | 7 | 8 | 9 | 10 | 11 | Final |
|---|---|---|---|---|---|---|---|---|---|---|---|---|
| Northwest Territories/Yukon (Cormier) | 0 | 0 | 0 | 2 | 1 | 0 | 2 | 1 | 0 | 1 | 0 | 7 |
| Alberta (Sweeting) 🔨 | 0 | 0 | 3 | 0 | 0 | 1 | 0 | 0 | 3 | 0 | 2 | 9 |

| Sheet B | 1 | 2 | 3 | 4 | 5 | 6 | 7 | 8 | 9 | 10 | Final |
|---|---|---|---|---|---|---|---|---|---|---|---|
| Manitoba (Thurston) | 1 | 0 | 1 | 0 | 1 | 0 | 2 | 0 | 1 | 0 | 6 |
| New Brunswick (Kelly) 🔨 | 0 | 1 | 0 | 4 | 0 | 2 | 0 | 1 | 0 | 1 | 9 |

| Sheet C | 1 | 2 | 3 | 4 | 5 | 6 | 7 | 8 | 9 | 10 | Final |
|---|---|---|---|---|---|---|---|---|---|---|---|
| Prince Edward Island (O'Rourke) 🔨 | 1 | 0 | 2 | 0 | 1 | 0 | 1 | 0 | 0 | X | 5 |
| British Columbia (Scott) | 0 | 3 | 0 | 2 | 0 | 2 | 0 | 1 | 2 | X | 10 |

| Sheet D | 1 | 2 | 3 | 4 | 5 | 6 | 7 | 8 | 9 | 10 | Final |
|---|---|---|---|---|---|---|---|---|---|---|---|
| Canada (Jones) 🔨 | 1 | 1 | 0 | 5 | 0 | 0 | 1 | 3 | X | X | 11 |
| Nova Scotia (McConnery) | 0 | 0 | 1 | 0 | 2 | 1 | 0 | 0 | X | X | 4 |

=== Draw 17 ===
Thursday, February 4, 7:30 pm

| Sheet A | 1 | 2 | 3 | 4 | 5 | 6 | 7 | 8 | 9 | 10 | Final |
|---|---|---|---|---|---|---|---|---|---|---|---|
| Manitoba (Thurston) | 1 | 3 | 1 | 3 | 0 | 0 | 0 | 2 | X | X | 10 |
| Quebec (Bélisle) 🔨 | 0 | 0 | 0 | 0 | 2 | 1 | 1 | 0 | X | X | 4 |

| Sheet B | 1 | 2 | 3 | 4 | 5 | 6 | 7 | 8 | 9 | 10 | Final |
|---|---|---|---|---|---|---|---|---|---|---|---|
| Saskatchewan (Holland) | 0 | 1 | 2 | 0 | 0 | 2 | 0 | 1 | 0 | 1 | 7 |
| Alberta (Sweeting) 🔨 | 1 | 0 | 0 | 1 | 1 | 0 | 1 | 0 | 2 | 0 | 6 |

| Sheet C | 1 | 2 | 3 | 4 | 5 | 6 | 7 | 8 | 9 | 10 | Final |
|---|---|---|---|---|---|---|---|---|---|---|---|
| Canada (Jones) | 0 | 2 | 0 | 2 | 0 | 0 | 0 | 1 | 0 | 1 | 6 |
| Ontario (McCarville) 🔨 | 1 | 0 | 1 | 0 | 0 | 1 | 0 | 0 | 2 | 0 | 5 |

| Sheet D | 1 | 2 | 3 | 4 | 5 | 6 | 7 | 8 | 9 | 10 | Final |
|---|---|---|---|---|---|---|---|---|---|---|---|
| Newfoundland and Labrador (Nichols) | 0 | 1 | 0 | 0 | 0 | 0 | 0 | 1 | 0 | X | 2 |
| British Columbia (Scott) 🔨 | 1 | 0 | 1 | 1 | 1 | 0 | 2 | 0 | 2 | X | 8 |

== Tiebreaker ==
Friday, February 5, 3:00 pm

| Sheet C | 1 | 2 | 3 | 4 | 5 | 6 | 7 | 8 | 9 | 10 | Final |
|---|---|---|---|---|---|---|---|---|---|---|---|
| Ontario (McCarville) 🔨 | 0 | 3 | 0 | 2 | 0 | 3 | 2 | X | X | X | 10 |
| Manitoba (Thurston) | 0 | 0 | 2 | 0 | 1 | 0 | 0 | X | X | X | 3 |

Player percentages
| Ontario | | Manitoba | |
|---|---|---|---|
| Kari MacLean | 82% | Raunora Westcott | 96% |
| Ashley Miharija | 93% | Leslie Wilson | 91% |
| Tara George | 86% | Kirsten Phillips | 59% |
| Krista McCarville | 79% | Jill Thurston | 68% |
| Total | 85% | Total | 79% |

== Playoffs ==
Page playoff system
1 | Prince Edward Island | 5
2 | Canada | 8
3 | British Columbia | 4
4 | Ontario | 6

Semifinal
1 | Prince Edward Island | 10
4 | Ontario | 6

Final
2 | Canada | 8
1 | Prince Edward Island | 7

=== 1 vs. 2 ===
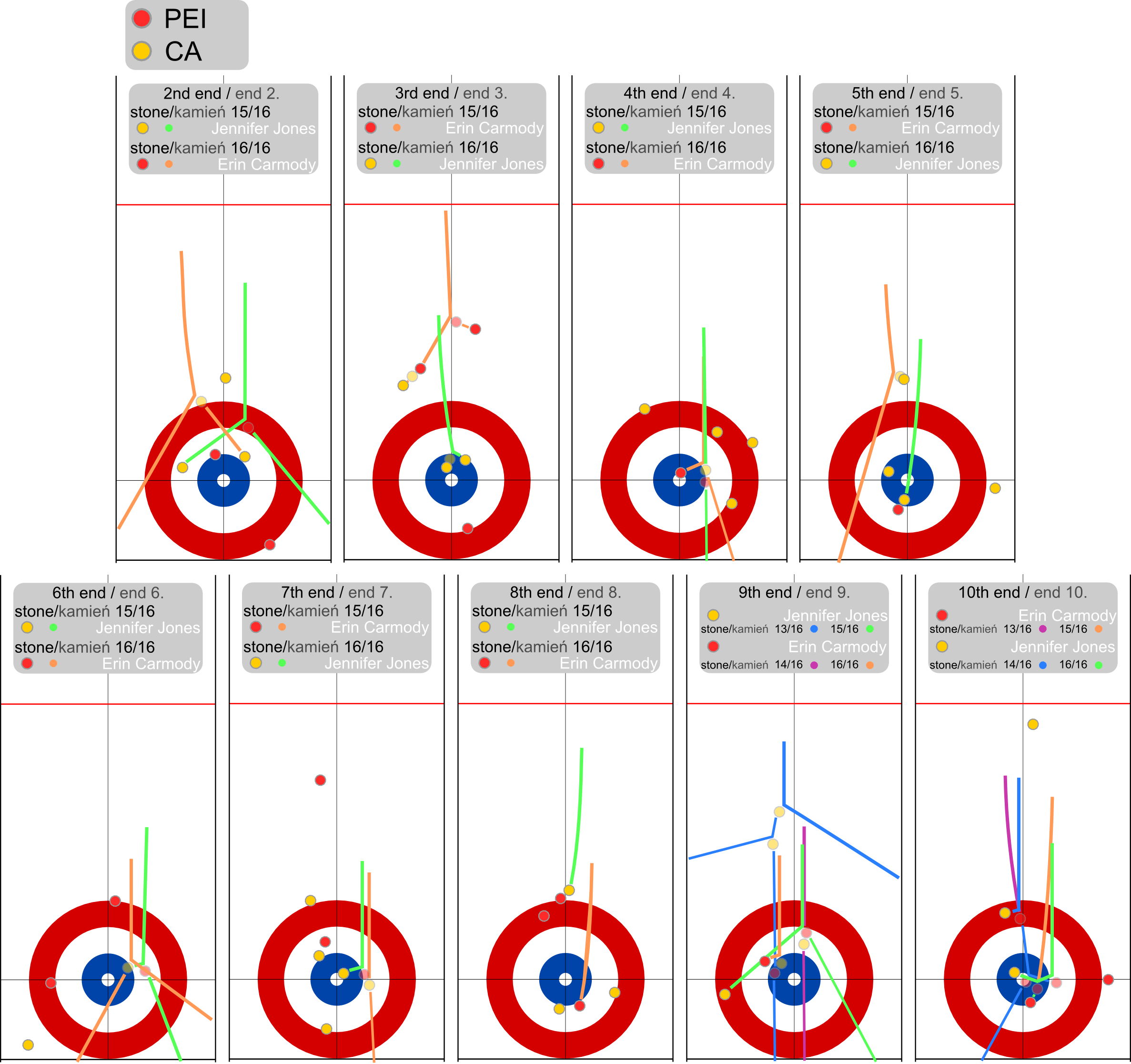

Friday, February 5, 7:30 pm

| Sheet C | 1 | 2 | 3 | 4 | 5 | 6 | 7 | 8 | 9 | 10 | Final |
|---|---|---|---|---|---|---|---|---|---|---|---|
| Prince Edward Island (O'Rourke) 🔨 | 0 | 1 | 0 | 1 | 0 | 2 | 0 | 0 | 1 | 0 | 5 |
| Canada (Jones) | 0 | 0 | 2 | 0 | 2 | 0 | 2 | 1 | 0 | 1 | 8 |

Player percentages
| Prince Edward Island | | Canada | |
|---|---|---|---|
| Tricia Affleck | 84% | Dawn Askin | 73% |
| Kathy O'Rourke | 84% | Jill Officer | 86% |
| Geri-Lynn Ramsay | 76% | Cathy Overton-Clapham | 80% |
| Erin Carmody | 60% | Jennifer Jones | 78% |
| Total | 76% | Total | 79% |

=== 3 vs. 4 ===
Saturday, February 6, 1:00 pm

| Team | 1 | 2 | 3 | 4 | 5 | 6 | 7 | 8 | 9 | 10 | Final |
|---|---|---|---|---|---|---|---|---|---|---|---|
| British Columbia (Scott) 🔨 | 1 | 0 | 1 | 0 | 1 | 0 | 0 | 1 | 0 | X | 4 |
| Ontario (McCarville) | 0 | 1 | 0 | 2 | 0 | 0 | 2 | 0 | 1 | X | 6 |

Player percentages
| British Columbia | | Ontario | |
|---|---|---|---|
| Jacquie Armstrong | 80% | Kari MacLean | 85% |
| Sasha Carter | 84% | Ashley Miharija | 81% |
| Jeanna Schraeder | 70% | Tara George | 73% |
| Kelly Scott | 71% | Krista McCarville | 88% |
| Total | 76% | Total | 82% |

=== Semifinal ===
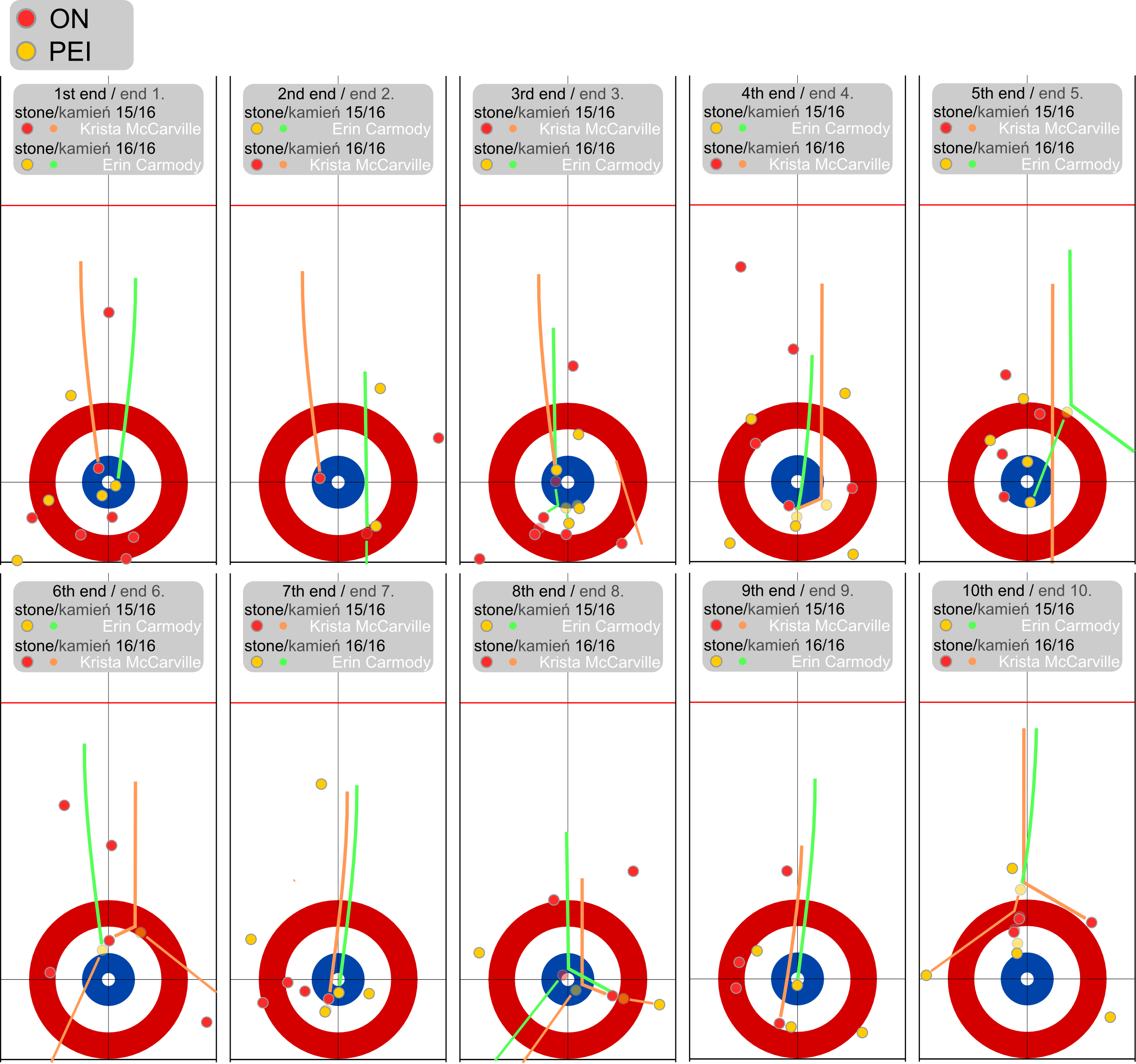

Saturday, February 6, 7:00 pm

| Sheet C | 1 | 2 | 3 | 4 | 5 | 6 | 7 | 8 | 9 | 10 | Final |
|---|---|---|---|---|---|---|---|---|---|---|---|
| Prince Edward Island (O'Rourke) 🔨 | 2 | 0 | 3 | 0 | 2 | 0 | 1 | 0 | 1 | 1 | 10 |
| Ontario (McCarville) | 0 | 1 | 0 | 1 | 0 | 2 | 0 | 2 | 0 | 0 | 6 |

Player percentages
| Prince Edward Island | | Ontario | |
|---|---|---|---|
| Tricia Affleck | 84% | Kari MacLean | 90% |
| Kathy O'Rourke | 75% | Ashley Miharija | 70% |
| Geri-Lynn Ramsay | 65% | Tara George | 73% |
| Erin Carmody | 93% | Krista McCarville | 70% |
| Total | 79% | Total | 76% |

=== Final ===
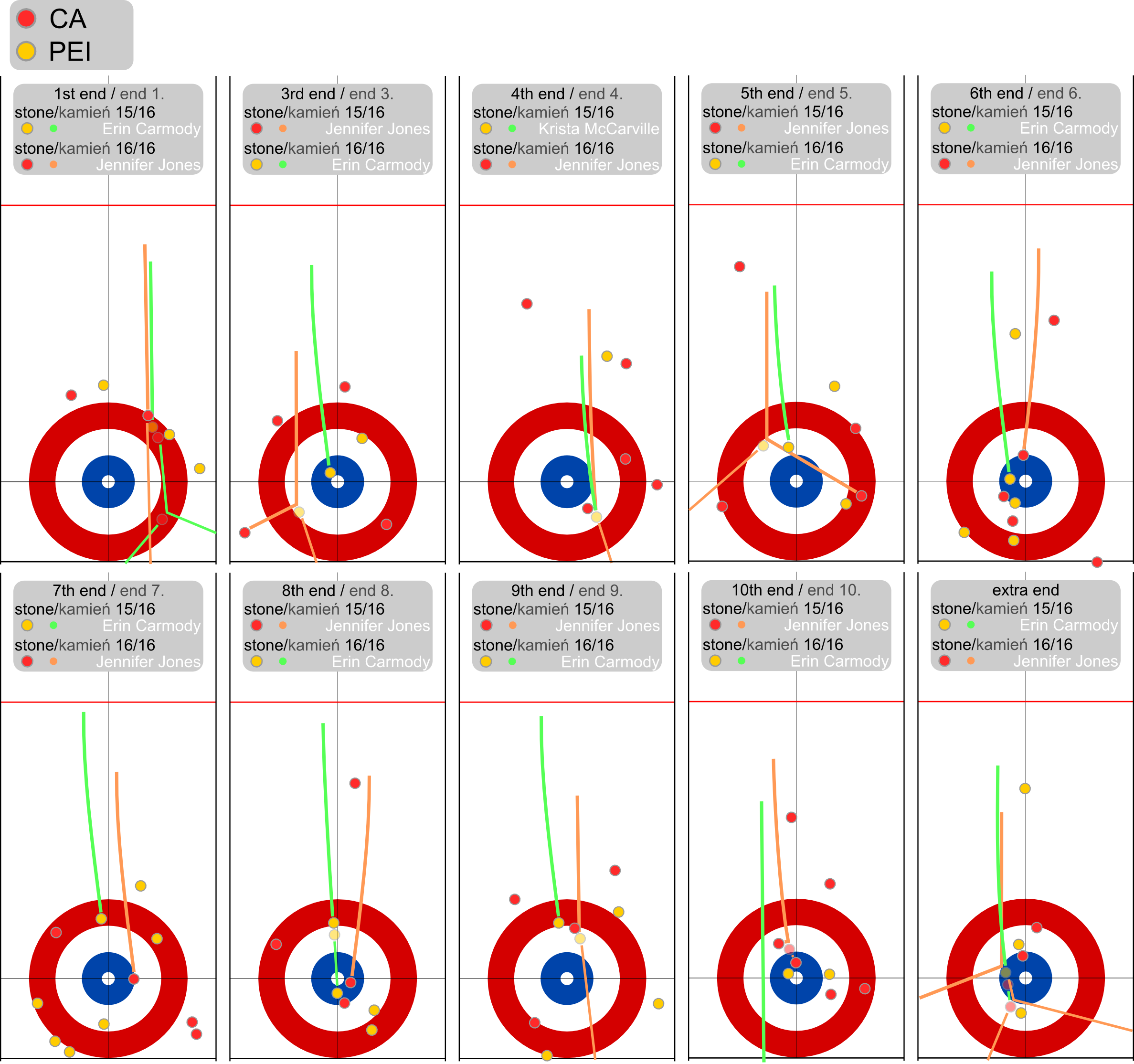

Sunday, February 7, 2:30 pm

| Sheet C | 1 | 2 | 3 | 4 | 5 | 6 | 7 | 8 | 9 | 10 | 11 | Final |
|---|---|---|---|---|---|---|---|---|---|---|---|---|
| Canada (Jones) 🔨 | 1 | 0 | 0 | 2 | 0 | 0 | 1 | 1 | 2 | 0 | 1 | 8 |
| Prince Edward Island (O'Rourke) | 0 | 0 | 2 | 0 | 2 | 2 | 0 | 0 | 0 | 1 | 0 | 7 |

Player percentages
| Canada | | Prince Edward Island | |
|---|---|---|---|
| Dawn Askin | 89% | Tricia Affleck | 89% |
| Jill Officer | 69% | Kathy O'Rourke | 84% |
| Cathy Overton-Clapham | 73% | Geri-Lynn Ramsay | 78% |
| Jennifer Jones | 81% | Erin Carmody | 78% |
| Total | 78% | Total | 82% |

== Statistics ==
=== Top 5 Player percentages ===
Key
| First All-Star Team |
| Second All-Star Team |

| Leads | % |
|---|---|
| (Canada) Dawn Askin | 87 |
| (British Columbia) Jacquie Armstrong | 82 |
| (Saskatchewan) Heather Kalenchuk | 82 |
| (Prince Edward Island) Tricia Affleck | 80 |
| (Quebec) Julie Rainville | 80 |

| Seconds | % |
|---|---|
| (Canada) Jill Officer | 81 |
| (British Columbia) Sasha Carter | 80 |
| (Manitoba) Leslie Wilson | 78 |
| (Northern Ontario) Ashley Miharija | 76 |
| (New Brunswick) Jillian Babin | 76 |

| Thirds | % |
|---|---|
| (Canada) Cathy Overton-Clapham | 81 |
| (British Columbia) Jeanna Schraeder | 77 |
| (Quebec) Brenda Nicholls | 75 |
| (Manitoba) Kirsten Phillips | 75 |
| (Newfoundland and Labrador) Stephanie LeDrew | 81 |

| Skips | % |
|---|---|
| (British Columbia) Kelly Scott | 79 |
| (Canada) Jennifer Jones | 76 |
| (Northern Ontario) Krista McCarville | 75 |
| (Saskatchewan) Amber Holland | 74 |
| (Manitoba) Jill Thurston | 73 |

== Awards ==
=== All-Star teams ===
First Team
| Position | Name | Team |
|---|---|---|
| Skip | Kelly Scott | British Columbia |
| Third | Cathy Overton-Clapham | Canada |
| Second | Jill Officer | Canada |
| Lead | Dawn Askin | Canada |

Second Team
| Position | Name | Team |
|---|---|---|
| Skip | Jennifer Jones | Canada |
| Third | Jeanna Schraeder | British Columbia |
| Second | Sasha Carter | British Columbia |
| Lead | Jacquie Armstrong | British Columbia |

=== Marj Mitchell Sportsmanship Award ===
The Marj Mitchell Sportsmanship Award was presented to the player chosen by their fellow peers as the curler that most exemplified sportsmanship and dedication to curling during the annual Scotties Tournament of Hearts.

| Name | Position | Team |
|---|---|---|
| Kelly Scott (2) | Skip | British Columbia |

=== Sandra Schmirler Most Valuable Player Award ===
The Sandra Schmirler Most Valuable Player Award was awarded to the top player in the playoff round by members of the media in the Scotties Tournament of Hearts.

| Name | Position | Team |
|---|---|---|
| Erin Carmody | Fourth | Prince Edward Island |

=== Joan Mead Builder Award ===
The Joan Mead Builder Award recognizes a builder in the sport of curling named in the honour of the late CBC curling producer Joan Mead.

| Name | Contribution(s) |
|---|---|
| Anne Merklinger | Curler, curling organizer |

=== Shot of the Week Award ===
The Shot of the Week Award was awarded to the curler who had been determined with the most outstanding shot during the tournament as voted on by TSN commentators.

| Name | Position | Team |
|---|---|---|
| Krista McCarville | Skip | Ontario |

== Provincial and territorial playdowns ==
- 2010 Alberta Scotties Tournament of Hearts
- 2010 British Columbia Scotties Tournament of Hearts
- 2010 Manitoba Scotties Tournament of Hearts
- 2010 New Brunswick Scotties Tournament of Hearts
- 2010 Newfoundland and Labrador Scotties Tournament of Hearts
- 2010 Nova Scotia Scotties Tournament of Hearts
- 2010 Ontario Scotties Tournament of Hearts
- 2010 Prince Edward Island Scotties Tournament of Hearts
- 2010 Quebec Scotties Tournament of Hearts
- 2010 Saskatchewan Scotties Tournament of Hearts
- (Northwest Territories) 2010 NWT/Yukon Scotties Tournament of Hearts
