= 2010 Saskatchewan Scotties Tournament of Hearts =

The 2010 Saskatchewan Scotties Tournament of Hearts is the 2010 edition of the Saskatchewan provincial women's curling championship. It was held January 6–10. Play began at the Kindersley Curling Club in Kindersley, Saskatchewan. However, due to a fire at the Kindersley Complex on January 8, the Scotties tournament play had been suspended January 8 until January 9. The remainder of the games were held at the Eston Curling Club in Eston, Saskatchewan. The winning team represented Saskatchewan at the 2010 Scotties Tournament of Hearts in Sault Ste. Marie, Ontario.

== Teams ==
Skip	Third	Second	Lead	Club
Sherry Anderson	Kim Hodson	Heather Walsh	Donna Gignac	Granite Curling Club, Saskatoon
Jolene Campbell	Rene Miettinen	Tanya Craig	Michelle McIvor	Tartan Curling Club, Regina
Chantelle Eberle	Nancy Inglis	Allison Slupski	Debbie Lozinski	Tartan Curling Club, Regina
Michelle Englot	Deanna Doig	Roberta Materi	Cindy Simmons	Tartan Curling Club, Regina
Patty Hersikorn	Jill Shumay	Allison Gerhardt	Shelley Madsen	Nutana Curling Club, Saskatoon
Amber Holland	Kim Schneider	Tammy Schneider	Heather Kalenchuk	Kronau Curling Club, Kronau
Cathy Inglis	Susan Hoffart	Denise Hersikorn	Terri Clark	Caledonian Curling Club, Regina
Susan Lang	Linda Burnham	Donna Ell	Patty Bell	Caledonian Curling Club, Regina
Stefanie Lawton	Marliese Kasner	Sherri Singler	Lana Vey	Nutana Curling Club, Saskatoon
Cindy Ricci	Natalie Bloomfield	Tamara Kapell	Kristy Johnston	Lampman Curling Club, Lampman
Robyn Silvernagle	Sasha Yole	Dayna Demmans	Kendra Syrota	Meadow Lake Curling Club, Meadow Lake
Tracy Streifel	Heather Torrie	Kristen Smith	Christine Paradis	Nutana Curling Club, Saskatoon

== Standings ==
=== Pool A ===
Skip	W	L
Holland	5	0
Eberle	3	2
Campbell	2	3
Inglis	2	3
Silvernagle	2	3
Ricci	1	4

- Holland 10-1 Inglis
- Eberle 7-3 Campbell
- Inglis 9-8 Ricci
- Silvernagle 8-6 Eberle (11)
- Ricci 10-3 Campbell
- Holland 9-1 Silvernagle
- Campbell 7-6 Inglis
- Holland 6-4 Eberle
- Holland 6-5 Ricci
- Campbell 8-6 Silvernagle
- Eberle 8-3 Ricci
- Inglis 7-5 Silvernagle
- Holland 11-0 Campbell
- Eberle 12-6 Inglis
- Silvernagle 10-1 Ricci

=== Pool B ===
Skip	W	L
Anderson	4	1
Lawton	4	1
Englot	3	2
Hersikorn	3	2
Lang	1	4
Streifel	0	5

- Lawton 8-7 Streifel (11)
- Englot 6-5 Anderson
- Englot 10-2 Lang
- Hersikorn 8-5 Streifel
- Anderson 9-3 Hersikorn
- Lawton 9-1 Lang
- Anderson 9-4 Streifel
- Lawton 6-5 Englot
- Lawton 5-3 Hersikorn
- Anderson 9-5 Lang
- Hersikorn 9-7 Englot
- Lang 7-5 Streifel
- Englot 12-6 Streifel
- Anderson 6-3 Lawton
- Hersikorn 9-7 Lang

== Playoffs ==
Page playoff system
A1	Amber Holland	4
B1	Sherry Anderson	9
A2	Chantelle Eberle	2
B2	Stefanie Lawton	9

Semifinal
A1	Amber Holland	8
B2	Stefanie Lawton	6

Final
B1	Sherry Anderson	6
A1	Amber Holland	9

=== A1 vs. B1 ===
January 10, 9:00 AM

Team	1	2	3	4	5	6	7	8	9	10	Final
Holland	1	0	1	0	1	0	1	0	0	X	4
Anderson	0	1	0	3	0	2	0	1	2	X	9

=== A2 vs. B2 ===
January 10, 9:00 AM

Team	1	2	3	4	5	6	7	8	9	10	Final
Eberle	0	0	0	1	0	1	0	X	X	X	2
Lawton	0	2	0	0	1	0	6	X	X	X	9

=== Semifinal ===
January 10, 2:00 PM

Team	1	2	3	4	5	6	7	8	9	10	Final
Holland	2	2	0	1	1	0	1	0	1	X	8
Lawton	0	0	2	0	0	2	0	2	0	X	6

=== Final ===
January 10, 7:00 PM

Team	1	2	3	4	5	6	7	8	9	10	Final
Anderson	1	0	1	0	2	0	2	0	0	X	6
Holland	0	1	0	3	0	2	0	1	2	X	9
