= Amber Holland =

Canadian curler (born 1974)

- Curler
- Born: July 10, 1974 (age 52); Yorkton, Saskatchewan

Team
- Curling club: Sutherland CC, Saskatoon, SK
- Skip: Amber Holland
- Third: Jill Shumay
- Second: Sherri Singler
- Lead: Ternna Derdall

Curling career
- Member Association: Saskatchewan
- Hearts: 9 (1999, 2006, 2010, 2011, 2012, 2017, 2021, 2022, 2024)
- World Championship: 1 (2011)
- Top CTRS ranking: 2nd (2010–11)
- Grand Slam victories: 1 (2008 Players')
Medal record
Curling
World Championships
Silver medal – second place	2011 Esbjerg
Scotties Tournament of Hearts
Gold medal – first place	2011 Charlottetown
World Junior Championships
Silver medal – second place	1993 Grindelwald

Amber Holland (born July 10, 1974) is a Canadian curler from Loreburn, Saskatchewan. Holland skipped Saskatchewan's team to a national women's championship in 2011 by defeating defending champion Jennifer Jones in the Scotties Tournament of Hearts and won a silver medal at the 2011 Capital One World Women's Curling Championship. She also won a national championship at the junior level in 1992, and captured a silver medal at the World Junior Curling Championships in 1993 after losing in the final.

Holland currently coaches the Kerry Galusha rink.

== Curling career ==
=== 1992–2010 ===
Holland's first experience curling at the national level came at the 1992 Canadian Junior Curling Championships in Vernon, British Columbia, where she skipped her Saskatchewan team to a national championship. Her teammates at the event included Angela Street, Tracy Beach and Cindy Street. Holland and her rink represented Canada at the 1993 World Junior Curling Championships, where they captured the silver medal.

After beginning play on the women's circuit after her junior career was finished in 1993, Holland did not have immediate success. She has played in Saskatchewan's provincial playdowns ten times, but did not appear at the Scotties Tournament of Hearts until 1999, when she served as an alternate for her former junior teammate Cindy Street. She also served as an alternate for Tracy Streifel's team at the 2006 event. Holland competed in Canada's Olympic curling trials in 2001 and 2005. She skipped her own entry in 2001, and played as an alternate with Sherry Anderson's rink in 2005.

Holland's 2011 championship rink of third Kim Schneider, second (and Kim's sister) Tammy Schneider and lead Heather Kalenchuk got together in 2005. In 2008 they won the World Curling Tour Players' Championships. The team was coached by Merv Fonger and the alternate was Jolene Campbell.

=== 2010–2012 ===
On January 10, 2010, Holland advanced to her first Scotties Tournament of Hearts as a skip by defeating Sherry Anderson 9-6 in the final of the Saskatchewan championship in Eston. Skipping team Saskatchewan, Holland's rink finished the 2010 Scotties Tournament of Hearts with a 6-5 record, out of the playoffs. Holland captured the Ford Hot Shot skills competition at the 2010 tournament, defeating Ontario lead Kari MacLean to win a two-year lease on a 2010 Ford Taurus.

Holland and her rink again represented Saskatchewan at the 2011 Scotties Tournament of Hearts. They started the round robin portion of the tournament with an eight-game winning streak, and finished in first place overall. Holland played defending champion Jennifer Jones in the final. The final was tied at seven heading into the final end. Holland stole a single point to win after Jones missed her final shot. After the tournament, Holland was awarded the Sandra Schmirler Most Valuable Player Award. Sandra Schmirler skipped the last team from Saskatchewan that won the national championship in 1997. At the 2012 Scotties Tournament of Hearts, Holland and her team would have a difficult time, finishing round robin with a 6-5 record. They would not make the playoffs, marking the first time since 2008 Team Canada would not be in the playoffs.

After seven years of playing with her Canadian Championship winning team, Holland announced that she would leave her squad (Kim Schneider, Tammy Schneider, Heather Kalenchuk). Holland told her team she wanted to go in another direction. Kalenchuk decided to step away from the game for a few years. Kim Schneider moved to play with Deanna Doig, and Tammy Schneider did not curl competitively during the 2012-13 season. This split left the four players ineligible for $72,000 worth of federal funding earned from winning the 2011 Scotties Tournament of Hearts, and they will forfeit their spot earned in the 2013 Olympic Curling Pre-Trials.

=== 2012–2014 ===
For the 2012/2013 curling season, Holland formed a new team consisting of longtime alternate Jolene Campbell at third, Brooklyn Lemon at second, and Dailene Sivertson, who previously played for Kelly Scott, at lead. Holland's new lineup finished 3rd at the 2013 Saskatchewan Scotties Tournament of Hearts and did not advance to the final 8 in any of the 4 Grand Slam events entered. Their best World Curling Tour event was 3rd place at the 2013 Pomeroy Inn & Suites Prairie Showdown. Following the season, the team made a minor lineup change, with Lemon and Sivertson switching places.

In the 2013–14 curling season, the team played in the 2013 Canadian Olympic Curling Pre-Trials, where they lost all three of their matches. They played in three slams in the season, missing the playoffs in all three events. At the 2014 Saskatchewan Scotties Tournament of Hearts, Holland led her rink to a 3–2 round robin record, but lost in their second tiebreaker match.

=== 2014–2015 ===
Holland began the 2014–15 curling season with a new lineup of Cathy Overton-Clapham, Sasha Carter and Chelsey Matson. The team played in three Slams that year, making it to the semifinals at the 2014 Curlers Corner Autumn Gold Curling Classic.

=== 2017–2020 ===
Holland did not return to competitive curling until 2017, with a new team consisting of Sherri Singler, Laura Strong and Debbie Lozinski. In their first season together, the team played in the 2018 Saskatchewan Scotties Tournament of Hearts, going 2–6. In 2018, the team added Cindy Ricci at third, replacing Singler. The team fared much better at the 2019 Saskatchewan Scotties Tournament of Hearts, going 5–3 in the round robin, before losing in the 3 vs. 4 game to Kristen Streifel. In the 2019–20 curling season, the team played in two Slams. At the 2020 Saskatchewan Scotties Tournament of Hearts, the team were knocked out in the C event after winning just two games.

=== 2020–present ===
In 2020, Kim Schneider re-joined the Holland rink at third, and Karlee Korchinski replaced Strong at second. There were no provincials in 2021 due to the COVID-19 pandemic, however Holland was invited to join the Saskatchewan team at the 2021 Scotties Tournament of Hearts. The team, which was skipped by Sherry Anderson finished with a 6–6 record. The following year, Team Holland won the 2021 DeKalb Superspiel. At the 2022 Saskatchewan Scotties Tournament of Hearts, the team made the playoffs, where they won the C1 vs C2 game before losing in the semifinal to the eventual winner, Penny Barker. The Barker rink invited Holland to be the team's alternate at the 2022 Scotties Tournament of Hearts, where they finished with a 4–4 record. At the end of the season, Team Holland played in the 2022 Champions Cup, where they failed to make the playoffs.

== Teams ==
Season	Skip	Third	Second	Lead
1991–92	Amber Holland	Angela Street	Tracy Beach	Cindy Street
1992–93	Amber Holland	Angela Street	Tracy Beach	Cindy Street
1997–98	Amber Holland	Kay Montgomery	Patty Bell	Lisa Lewis
1998–99	Amber Holland	Kay Montgomery	Karen Purdy	Patty Bell
1999–00	Amber Holland	Kay Montgomery	Karen Purdy	Patty Bell
2000–01	Amber Holland	Kay Montgomery	Karen Purdy	Patty Bell
2002–03	Amber Holland	Kay Montgomery	Karen Purdy	Patty Bell
2003–04	Amber Holland	Karen Purdy	Carla Mack	Patty Bell
2004–05	Amber Holland	Karen Purdy	Carla Mack	Patty Bell
2005–06	Amber Holland	Kim Schneider	Tammy Schneider	Heather Seeley
2006–07	Amber Holland	Kim Schneider	Tammy Schneider	Heather Seeley
2007–08	Amber Holland	Kim Schneider	Tammy Schneider	Heather Seeley
2008–09	Amber Holland	Kim Schneider	Tammy Schneider	Heather Seeley
2009–10	Amber Holland	Kim Schneider	Tammy Schneider	Heather Kalenchuk
2010–11	Amber Holland	Kim Schneider	Tammy Schneider	Heather Kalenchuk
2011–12	Amber Holland	Kim Schneider	Tammy Schneider	Heather Kalenchuk
2012–13	Amber Holland	Jolene Campbell	Brooklyn Lemon	Dailene Sivertson
2013–14	Amber Holland	Jolene Campbell	Dailene Sivertson	Brooklyn Lemon
2014–15	Amber Holland	Cathy Overton-Clapham	Sasha Carter	Chelsey Matson
2017–18	Amber Holland	Sherri Singler	Laura Strong	Debbie Lozinski
2018–19	Amber Holland	Cindy Ricci	Laura Strong	Debbie Lozinski
2019–20	Amber Holland	Cindy Ricci	Laura Strong	Debbie Lozinski
2020–21	Amber Holland	Kim Schneider	Karlee Korchinski	Debbie Lozinski
2021–22	Amber Holland	Kim Schneider	Karlee Korchinski	Debbie Lozinski
2022–23	Amber Holland	Kim Schneider	Karlee Korchinski	Debbie Lozinski
2023–24	Amber Holland	Kim Schneider	Jill Springer	Debbie Lozinski
2024–25	Amber Holland	Jill Shumay	Sherri Singler	Ternna Derdall

== Personal life ==
Holland started curling when she was 11. She served as the technical director for the Saskatchewan Curling Association from 1997 to 2009. In 2009, she was appointed executive director of the organization. She currently works as an administration and marketing manager for Harbor Golf Club.

== Grand Slam record ==
Key
C	Champion
F	Lost in Final
SF	Lost in Semifinal
QF	Lost in Quarterfinals
R16	Lost in the round of 16
Q	Did not advance to playoffs
T2	Played in Tier 2 event
DNP	Did not participate in event
N/A	Not a Grand Slam event that season

Event	2005–06	2006–07	2007–08	2008–09	2009–10	2010–11	2011–12	2012–13	2013–14	2014–15	2015–16	2016–17	2017–18	2018–19	2019–20	2020–21	2021–22
Masters	N/A	N/A	N/A	N/A	N/A	N/A	N/A	Q	DNP	DNP	DNP	DNP	DNP	DNP	Q	N/A	DNP
Tour Challenge	N/A	N/A	N/A	N/A	N/A	N/A	N/A	N/A	N/A	N/A	DNP	DNP	T2	DNP	Q	N/A	N/A
Canadian Open	N/A	N/A	N/A	N/A	N/A	N/A	N/A	N/A	N/A	Q	DNP	DNP	DNP	DNP	DNP	N/A	N/A
Players'	Q	DNP	C	Q	DNP	DNP	DNP	DNP	DNP	DNP	DNP	DNP	DNP	DNP	N/A	DNP	DNP
Champions Cup	N/A	N/A	N/A	N/A	N/A	N/A	N/A	N/A	N/A	N/A	DNP	DNP	DNP	DNP	N/A	DNP	Q

=== Former events ===
Event	2006–07	2007–08	2008–09	2009–10	2010–11	2011–12	2012–13	2013–14	2014–15
Autumn Gold	Q	QF	Q	QF	Q	Q	Q	Q	SF
Colonial Square	N/A	N/A	N/A	N/A	N/A	N/A	R16	Q	Q
Manitoba Liquor & Lotteries	Q	Q	Q	QF	Q	Q	Q	Q	N/A
Sobeys Slam	N/A	Q	Q	N/A	QF	N/A	N/A	N/A	N/A
Wayden Transportation	Q	DNP	Q	N/A	N/A	N/A	N/A	N/A	N/A
