= Tammy Schneider =

Canadian curler (born 1982)

- Curler
- Born: November 2, 1982 (age 44); Regina, Saskatchewan

Team
- Skip: Kim Schneider
- Third: Tammy Schneider
- Second: Michelle McIvor
- Lead: Shelby Hubick

Curling career
- Hearts: 3 (2010, 2011, 2012)
- World Championship: 1 (2011)
- Top CTRS ranking: 2nd (2010-11)
- Grand Slam victories: 1: (Players, 2008)
Medal record
Curling
World Championships
Silver medal – second place	2011 Esbjerg
Scotties Tournament of Hearts
Gold medal – first place	2011 Charlottetown
World Junior Championships
Gold medal – first place	2003 Flims

Tammy Schneider (born November 12, 1982, in Regina, Saskatchewan) is a Canadian curler from Kronau, Saskatchewan. She currently plays third for her sister, Kim.

== Career ==
=== Juniors ===
Schneider grew up in the small village of Kronau, Saskatchewan, outside of Regina. She and her sister and teammate Kim were the daughters of 1990 provincial champion lead Larry Schneider.

In 1998, Schneider won a silver medal at the Saskatchewan Winter Games. Schneider played in three Saskatchewan junior championships, but never won. In 2003, she was invited to play as the alternate for team Canada at the 2003 World Junior Curling Championships. Schneider played in just one match, but the team (skipped by Marliese Miller won a gold medal. In 2004 and 2005 she would play in the University national championships.

=== 2004–2012 ===
After juniors, Schneider played for Cindy Street, playing in the 2004 and 2005 women's provincial championship. For the 2005/06 season Schneider would leave to play with Amber Holland.

In 2008, the team won their only Grand Slam event, the 2008 Players' Championships.

In 2009 the team would earn a spot in the Canadian Olympic Curling Trials, after defeating Marie-France Larouche in the C Qualifier. The team would finish round robin with a 4–3 record, tied for third place. They would lose the second tiebreaker to Krista McCarville in an extra end.

Together the team played in their first Saskatchewan Scotties Tournament of Hearts in 2008 and again in 2009. They would not find success until the 2010 Saskatchewan Scotties Tournament of Hearts, when they would finally break through and represent Saskatchewan at the 2010 Scotties Tournament of Hearts. They would miss the playoffs, finishing with a 6–5 record. The team would repeat as Saskatchewan champions in 2011. At the 2011 Scotties Tournament of Hearts, the team would finish round robin first with a 9–2 and advance to the playoffs. They would lose the 1-2 game to team Canada, before winning the semi-final, over team Ontario. In the final, they would again face team Canada (Jennifer Jones), and this time would come out victorious, stealing the win in the 10th end, winning the Canadian Championship. This was the first time since 1997, that a team from Saskatchewan would win the National Championship. Together the team would win a silver medal at the 2011 Capital One World Women's Curling Championship.

Returning to the Scotties in 2012, the team was looking to repeat and win their second Canadian Championship, however they would finish the tournament with a disappointing 6–5 round robin record, failing to reach the playoffs. This was the first time since 2008, Team Canada did not reach the playoffs.

After seven years of playing with her Canadian Championship winning team, Holland announced that she would leave her squad. Holland told her team she wants to go in another direction. Heather Kalenchuk has since decided to step away from the game for a few years, leaving Tammy and her sister Kim Schneider pondering their curling future. This departure by Holland left the four players ineligible for $72,000 worth of federal funding earned from winning the 2011 Scotties Tournament of Hearts, and they will forfeit their spot earned in the Olympic Curling Pre-Trials.

== Personal life ==
Schneider is an office administrator at DSI Contracting.

== Sources ==
- Extra End Magazine 2009-10, pg 56
- Curling runs in the family - Regina Leader-Post
- Hollandcurlingteam.com
- Canada's Olympic women's candidates - Edmonton Journal
