= 2008 Players' Championship =

Grand Slam of Curling event

The 2008 Tylenol Players' Championship is the last Grand Slam event of both the World Curling Tour and Women's Curling Tour for the 2007–08 season. This was the sixteenth time the event has taken place, and the third time since it was switched to joint men's/women's format. The event was held at the Mile One Centre in St. John's, Newfoundland and Labrador April 15–20. Since the event is a part of the Olympic qualifying process in Canada, only Canadian teams were invited. The total purse for each event is $100,000.

2008 Winners: (Ontario) Glenn Howard (Saskatchewan) Amber Holland

Both of these teams were awarded 40 CTRS points for their feats at the tournament.

== Men's ==
=== Teams ===
Key: CTRS refers to the CCA rankings and WCT refers to the money list ranking on the World Curling Tour.

Skip	City	CTRS	WCT
(Nova Scotia) Shawn Adams	Halifax, Nova Scotia	13	10
(Manitoba) Kerry Burtnyk	Winnipeg, Manitoba	4	7
(Manitoba) Reid Carruthers	Winnipeg, Manitoba	16	16
(Quebec) Robert Desjardins	Chicoutimi, Quebec	22	37
(Alberta) Randy Ferbey	Edmonton, Alberta	8	6
(Quebec) Martin Ferland	Cap-de-la-Madeleine, Quebec	18	15
(Newfoundland and Labrador) Brad Gushue	St. John's, Newfoundland and Labrador	7	11
(Ontario) Mike Harris (Note: Mike Harris skipped the Peter Corner team, sans Peter Corner. Ranking is for Corner's team.)	Brampton, Ontario	14	14
(Ontario) Glenn Howard	Coldwater, Ontario	2	2
(Alberta) Kevin Koe	Edmonton, Alberta	3	3
(Alberta) Kevin Martin	Edmonton, Alberta	1	1
(British Columbia) Greg McAulay	Richmond, British Columbia	11	12
(Manitoba) Mike McEwen	Winnipeg, Manitoba	12	17
(Ontario) Wayne Middaugh	Toronto, Ontario	9	4
(Saskatchewan) Pat Simmons	Davidson, Saskatchewan	6	8
(Manitoba) Jeff Stoughton	Winnipeg, Manitoba	5	5

=== A event ===
Quarterfinals
1	(Alberta) Kevin Martin	8 (Note: Default win)
18	(Quebec) Martin Ferland	0
7	(Newfoundland and Labrador) Brad Gushue	5
11	(British Columbia) Greg McAulay	8
3	(Alberta) Kevin Koe	5
16	(Manitoba) Reid Carruthers	4
5	(Manitoba) Jeff Stoughton	2
12	(Manitoba) Mike McEwen	7

Semifinals
1	(Alberta) Kevin Martin	7
11	(British Columbia) Greg McAulay	2
3	(Alberta) Kevin Koe	7
12	(Manitoba) Mike McEwen	3

Qualifier 1
1	(Alberta) Kevin Martin	5
3	(Alberta) Kevin Koe	3

Quarterfinals
2	(Ontario) Glenn Howard	8
22	(Quebec) Robert Desjardins	4
8	(Alberta) Randy Ferbey	3
9	(Ontario) Wayne Middaugh	4
4	(Manitoba) Kerry Burtnyk	7
14	(Ontario) Mike Harris	3
6	(Saskatchewan) Pat Simmons	6
13	(Nova Scotia) Shawn Adams	4

Semifinals
2	(Ontario) Glenn Howard	6
9	(Ontario) Wayne Middaugh	4
4	(Manitoba) Kerry Burtnyk	6
6	(Saskatchewan) Pat Simmons	7

Qualifier 2
2	(Ontario) Glenn Howard	7
6	(Saskatchewan) Pat Simmons	4

=== B Event ===
Semifinals
18	(Quebec) Martin Ferland	3
7	(Newfoundland and Labrador) Brad Gushue	6
16	(Manitoba) Reid Carruthers	2
5	(Manitoba) Jeff Stoughton	6

Finals
7	(Newfoundland and Labrador) Brad Gushue	8
5	(Manitoba) Jeff Stoughton	5

Qualifier 3
7	(Newfoundland and Labrador) Brad Gushue	2
6	(Saskatchewan) Pat Simmons	7

Semifinals
22	(Quebec) Robert Desjardins	4
8	(Alberta) Randy Ferbey	7
14	(Ontario) Mike Harris	6
13	(Nova Scotia) Shawn Adams	7

Finals
8	(Alberta) Randy Ferbey	1
13	(Nova Scotia) Shawn Adams	5

Qualifier 4
13	(Nova Scotia) Shawn Adams	3
3	(Alberta) Kevin Koe	5

Semifinals
11	(British Columbia) Greg McAulay	3
12	(Manitoba) Mike McEwen	6
9	(Ontario) Wayne Middaugh	5
4	(Manitoba) Kerry Burtnyk	4

Qualifier 5
12	(Manitoba) Mike McEwen	2
9	(Ontario) Wayne Middaugh	5

=== C Event ===
Semifinals			Finals
			4	(Manitoba) Kerry Burtnyk	5
18	(Quebec) Martin Ferland	5	16	(Manitoba) Reid Carruthers	4
16	(Manitoba) Reid Carruthers	7

Qualifier 6
4	(Manitoba) Kerry Burtnyk	6
13	(Nova Scotia) Shawn Adams	5

Semifinals			Finals
			11	(British Columbia) Greg McAulay	10
22	(Quebec) Robert Desjardins	9	22	(Quebec) Robert Desjardins	3
14	(Ontario) Mike Harris	8

Qualifier 7
11	(British Columbia) Greg McAulay	6
7	(Newfoundland and Labrador) Brad Gushue	5

Semifinals			Qualifier 8
			12	(Manitoba) Mike McEwen	3
5	(Manitoba) Jeff Stoughton	2	8	(Alberta) Randy Ferbey	5
8	(Alberta) Randy Ferbey	9

=== Championship ===
Quarterfinals
Q2	(Ontario) Glenn Howard	8
Q7	(British Columbia) Greg McAulay	2
Q3	(Saskatchewan) Pat Simmons	7
Q5	(Ontario) Wayne Middaugh	2
Q1	(Alberta) Kevin Martin	5
Q8	(Alberta) Randy Ferbey	4
Q4	(Alberta) Kevin Koe	6
Q6	(Manitoba) Kerry Burtnyk	2

Semifinals
Q2	(Ontario) Glenn Howard	5
Q3	(Saskatchewan) Pat Simmons	3
Q1	(Alberta) Kevin Martin	6
Q4	(Alberta) Kevin Koe	1

Finals
Q2	(Ontario) Glenn Howard	7
Q1	(Alberta) Kevin Martin	1

== Women's ==
=== Teams ===
Key: CTRS refers to the CCA rankings and WCT refers to the money list ranking on the Women's World Curling Tour.

Skip	City	CTRS	WCT
(Saskatchewan) Sherry Anderson	Saskatoon, Saskatchewan	8	8
(Quebec) Ève Bélisle	Montreal, Quebec	18	10
(Alberta) Cheryl Bernard	Calgary, Alberta	6	6
(Saskatchewan) Michelle Englot	Regina, Saskatchewan	7	9
(Saskatchewan) Amber Holland	Kronau, Saskatchewan	17	30
(Manitoba) Jennifer Jones	Winnipeg, Manitoba	1	2
(Alberta) Cathy King	Edmonton, Alberta	9	11
(Alberta) Shannon Kleibrink	Calgary, Alberta	2	1
(Saskatchewan) Stefanie Lawton	Saskatoon, Saskatchewan	4	4
(Ontario) Krista McCarville	Thunder Bay, Ontario	11	13
(Ontario) Sherry Middaugh	Coldwater, Ontario	5	5
(Alberta) Kristie Moore	Edmonton, Alberta	14	12
(Alberta) Heather Rankin	Calgary, Alberta	10	16
(Ontario) Julie Reddick (Note: Team was skipped by Mary-Anne Arsenault in place of Reddick.)	Brantford, Ontario	15	20
(British Columbia) Kelly Scott	Kelowna, British Columbia	3	3
(Newfoundland and Labrador) Heather Strong	St. John's, Newfoundland and Labrador	13	27

=== A event ===
Quarterfinals
2	(Alberta) Shannon Kleibrink	3
17	(Saskatchewan) Amber Holland	7
7	(Saskatchewan) Michelle Englot	11
10	(Alberta) Heather Rankin	7
3	(British Columbia) Kelly Scott	7
15	(Ontario) Julie Reddick	4
6	(Alberta) Cheryl Bernard	3
11	(Ontario) Krista McCarville	5

Semifinals
17	(Saskatchewan) Amber Holland	4
7	(Saskatchewan) Michelle Englot	7
3	(British Columbia) Kelly Scott	5
11	(Ontario) Krista McCarville	7

Qualifier 1
7	(Saskatchewan) Michelle Englot	6
11	(Ontario) Krista McCarville	3

Quarterfinals
1	(Manitoba) Jennifer Jones	3
18	(Quebec) Ève Bélisle	6
8	(Saskatchewan) Sherry Anderson	6
9	(Alberta) Cathy King	5
4	(Saskatchewan) Stefanie Lawton	5
14	(Alberta) Kristie Moore	3
5	(Ontario) Sherry Middaugh	6
13	(Newfoundland and Labrador) Heather Strong	5

Semifinals
18	(Quebec) Ève Bélisle	5
8	(Saskatchewan) Sherry Anderson	6
4	(Saskatchewan) Stefanie Lawton	7
5	(Ontario) Sherry Middaugh	8

Qualifier 2
8	(Saskatchewan) Sherry Anderson	7
5	(Ontario) Sherry Middaugh	2

=== B Event ===
Semifinals
10	(Alberta) Heather Rankin	4
2	(Alberta) Shannon Kleibrink	2
15	(Ontario) Julie Reddick	4
6	(Alberta) Cheryl Bernard	5

Finals
10	(Alberta) Heather Rankin	7
6	(Alberta) Cheryl Bernard	9

Qualifier 3
6	(Alberta) Cheryl Bernard	6
5	(Ontario) Sherry Middaugh	4

Semifinals
1	(Manitoba) Jennifer Jones	5
9	(Alberta) Cathy King	6
14	(Alberta) Kristie Moore	8
13	(Newfoundland and Labrador) Heather Strong	2

Finals
9	(Alberta) Cathy King	7
14	(Alberta) Kristie Moore	5

Qualifier 4
9	(Alberta) Cathy King	5
11	(Ontario) Krista McCarville	4

Semifinals
17	(Saskatchewan) Amber Holland	5
3	(British Columbia) Kelly Scott	4
18	(Quebec) Ève Bélisle	7
4	(Saskatchewan) Stefanie Lawton	5

Qualifier 5
17	(Saskatchewan) Amber Holland	4
18	(Quebec) Ève Bélisle	6

=== C Event ===
Semifinals			Finals
			4	(Saskatchewan) Stefanie Lawton	9
2	(Alberta) Shannon Kleibrink	9	2	(Alberta) Shannon Kleibrink	4
15	(Ontario) Julie Reddick	3

Qualifier 6
4	(Saskatchewan) Stefanie Lawton	4
11	(Ontario) Krista McCarville	5

Semifinals			Finals
			3	(British Columbia) Kelly Scott	3
1	(Manitoba) Jennifer Jones	7	1	(Manitoba) Jennifer Jones	5
13	(Newfoundland and Labrador) Heather Strong	6

Qualifier 7
1	(Manitoba) Jennifer Jones	5
5	(Ontario) Sherry Middaugh	7

Semifinals			Qualifier 8
			17	(Saskatchewan) Amber Holland	6
10	(Alberta) Heather Rankin	6	10	(Alberta) Heather Rankin	4
14	(Alberta) Kristie Moore	5

=== Championship ===
Quarterfinals
Q1	(Saskatchewan) Michelle Englot	6
Q8	(Saskatchewan) Amber Holland	8
Q4	(Alberta) Cathy King	7
Q5	(Quebec) Ève Bélisle	8
Q2	(Saskatchewan) Sherry Anderson	7
Q6	(Ontario) Krista McCarville	8
Q3	(Alberta) Cheryl Bernard	5
Q7	(Ontario) Sherry Middaugh	3

Semifinals
Q8	(Saskatchewan) Amber Holland	6
Q5	(Quebec) Ève Bélisle	4
Q6	(Ontario) Krista McCarville	7
Q3	(Alberta) Cheryl Bernard	2

Finals
Q8	(Saskatchewan) Amber Holland	6
Q6	(Ontario) Krista McCarville	4
