= Kim Schneider =

Canadian curler (born 1984)

- Curler
- Born: August 21, 1984 (age 42); Regina, Saskatchewan

Team
- Curling club: Kronau CC, Kronau, Saskatchewan
- Skip: Amber Holland
- Third: Kim Schneider
- Second: Jill Springer
- Lead: Debbie Lozinski

Curling career
- Member Association: Saskatchewan
- Hearts: 4 (2010, 2011, 2012, 2018)
- World Championship: 1 (2011)
- Top CTRS ranking: 2nd (2010–11)
- Grand Slam victories: 1 (2008 Players')
Medal record
Women's curling
World Championships
Silver medal – second place	2011 Esbjerg
Scotties Tournament of Hearts
Gold medal – first place	2011 Charlottetown

Kim Dawn Schneider (born August 21, 1984) is a Canadian curler. She currently plays third on Team Amber Holland.

== Career ==
=== Juniors ===
Born in Regina, Saskatchewan, Schneider grew up in the small village of Kronau, Saskatchewan outside of Regina. She and her sister and teammate Tammy were the daughters of 1990 provincial champion lead Larry Schneider.

In 2003 and 2004, Schneider played in the Saskatchewan junior championships, but never won.

=== 2005–2012 ===
After juniors, Schneider teamed up with Amber Holland, along with her sister Tammy Schneider and Heather Kalenchuk.

In 2008, the team won their only Grand Slam event, the 2008 Players' Championships.

In 2009 the team would earn a spot in the Canadian Olympic Curling Trials, after defeating Marie-France Larouche in the C Qualifier. The team would finish round robin with a 4-3 record, tied for third place. They would lose the second tiebreaker to Krista McCarville in an extra end.

Together the team played in their first Saskatchewan Scotties Tournament of Hearts in 2008 and again in 2009. They would not find success until the 2010 Saskatchewan Scotties Tournament of Hearts, when they would finally break through and represent Saskatchewan at the 2010 Scotties Tournament of Hearts. They would miss the playoffs, finishing with a 6–5 record. The team would repeat as Saskatchewan champions in 2011. At the 2011 Scotties Tournament of Hearts, the team would finish round robin first with a 9–2 and advance to the playoffs. They would lose the 1-2 game to team Canada, before winning the semi-final, over team Ontario. In the final, they would again face team Canada (Jennifer Jones), and this time would come out victorious, stealing the win in the 10th end, winning the Canadian Championship. This was the first time since 1997, that a team from Saskatchewan would win the National Championship. Together the team would win a silver medal at the 2011 Capital One World Women's Curling Championship.

Returning to the Scotties in 2012, the team was looking to repeat and win their second Canadian Championship, however they would finish the tournament with a disappointing 6–5 round robin record, failing to reach the playoffs. This was the first time since 2008, Team Canada did not reach the playoffs.

After seven years of playing with her Canadian Championship winning team, Holland announced that she would leave her squad. Holland told her team she wants to go in another direction. Heather Kalenchuk has since decided to step away from the game for a few years, leaving Kim and her sister Tammy Schneider pondering their curling future. This departure by Holland left the four players ineligible for $72,000 worth of federal funding earned from winning the 2011 Scotties Tournament of Hearts, and they will forfeit their spot earned in the Olympic Curling Pre-Trials.

=== 2012–current ===
Following the breakup of the Holland team, Schneider would team up with Deanna Doig, playing third for a new squad consisting of Colleen Ackerman and Michelle McIvor.

== Personal life ==
Schneider is a recreation therapist with Hopes home.

== Sources ==
- Extra End Magazine 2009-10, pg 56
- Curling runs in the family - Regina Leader-Post
- Hollandcurlingteam.com
- Canada's Olympic women's candidates - Edmonton Journal
