= Heather Kalenchuk =

Canadian curler (born 1984)

- Curler
- Born: Heather Seeley; March 14, 1984 (age 42); Edmonton, Alberta

Curling career
- Hearts: 3 (2010, 2011, 2012)
- World Championship: 1 (2011)
- Top CTRS ranking: 2nd (2010-11)
- Grand Slam victories: 1: (Players, 2008)
Medal record
Curling
World Championships
| Silver medal – second place | 2011 Esbjerg |
Scotties Tournament of Hearts
| Gold medal – first place | 2011 Charlottetown |

Heather Mary Yvonne Kalenchuk (born Heather Seeley, March 14, 1984) is a Canadian curler from Regina, Saskatchewan. She previously played lead for Amber Holland.

== Career ==
=== Juniors ===
Born in Edmonton, Alberta, Kalenchuk won the 2002 provincial high school mixed championship. In 2003, 2004 and 2005, she played in the provincial junior championship, but did not win. In 2005 and 2007, Kalenchuk played at the University national championships.

=== 2005–2012 ===
In 2008, the team won their only Grand Slam event, the 2008 Players' Championships.

In 2009 the team would earn a spot in the Canadian Olympic Curling Trials, after defeating Marie-France Larouche in the C Qualifier. The team would finish round robin with a 4–3 record, tied for third place. They would lose the second tiebreaker to Krista McCarville in an extra end.

Together the team played in their first Saskatchewan Scotties Tournament of Hearts in 2008 and again in 2009. They would not find success until the 2010 Saskatchewan Scotties Tournament of Hearts, when they would finally break through and represent Saskatchewan at the 2010 Scotties Tournament of Hearts. They would miss the playoffs, finishing with a 6–5 record. The team would repeat as Saskatchewan champions in 2011. At the 2011 Scotties Tournament of Hearts, the team would finish round robin first with a 9-2 and advance to the playoffs. They would lose the 1–2 game to team Canada, before winning the semi-final, over team Ontario. In the final, they would again face team Canada (Jennifer Jones), and this time would come out victorious, stealing the win in the 10th end, winning the Canadian Championship. This was the first time since 1997, that a team from Saskatchewan would win the National Championship. Together the team would win a silver medal at the 2011 Capital One World Women's Curling Championship.

Returning to the Scotties in 2012, the team was looking to repeat and win their second Canadian Championship, however they would finish the tournament with a disappointing 6-5 round robin record, failing to reach the playoffs. This was the first time since 2008, Team Canada did not reach the playoffs.

After seven years of playing with her Canadian Championship winning team, Holland announced that she would leave her squad. Holland told her team she wants to go in another direction. Kalenchuk has since decided to step away from the game for a few years, leaving Kim Schneider and her sister Tammy Schneider pondering their curling future. This departure by Holland left the four players ineligible for $72,000 worth of federal funding earned from winning the 2011 Scotties Tournament of Hearts, and they will forfeit their spot earned in the Olympic Curling Pre-Trials.

== Personal life ==
Kalenchuk is a French Immersion High School Teacher at Archbishop M.C. O'Neill High School.
