= 2018 Curlers Corner Autumn Gold Curling Classic =

Canadian curling sports event

- Host city: Calgary, Alberta
- Arena: Calgary Curling Club
- Dates: October 5–8
- Winner: (Manitoba) Team Einarson
- Curling club: Gimli CC, Gimli
- Skip: Kerri Einarson
- Third: Val Sweeting
- Second: Shannon Birchard
- Lead: Briane Meilleur
- Finalist: (Manitoba) Jennifer Jones

The 2018 Curlers Corner Autumn Gold Curling Classic was held from October 5 to 8 at the Calgary Curling Club in Calgary, Alberta. The event was a triple knockout format, and the purse for the event was CAD$50,000, with the winning team receiving $13,000.

Kerri Einarson from Gimli defeated the reigning Canadian champion Jennifer Jones rink from Winnipeg in the final. The win gave Einarson and her team their 4th World Curling Tour win of the 2018-19 curling season.

== Teams ==
The teams are listed as follows:

Skip	Third	Second	Lead	Locale
Sherry Anderson	Nancy Martin	Meaghan Frerichs	Alyssa Jenkins	Saskatoon, Saskatchewan
Corryn Brown	Erin Pincott	Dezaray Hawes	Ashley Klymchuk	Kamloops, British Columbia
Chelsea Carey	Sarah Wilkes	Dana Ferguson	Rachelle Brown	Edmonton, Alberta
Cory Christensen	Vicky Persinger	Jenna Martin	Madison Bear	Chaska, United States
Janais DeJong	Delia DeJong	Amy Janko	Morgan Watchorn	Sexsmith, Alberta
Kerri Einarson	Val Sweeting	Shannon Birchard	Briane Meilleur	Gimli, Manitoba
Kourtney Fesser	Natalie Yanko	Krista Fesser	Karlee Korchinski	Saskatoon, Saskatchewan
Allison Flaxey	Kate Cameron	Taylor McDonald	Raunora Westcott	Winnipeg, Manitoba
Tracy Fleury	Selena Njegovan	Liz Fyfe	Kristin MacCuish	East St. Paul, Manitoba
Satsuki Fujisawa	Chinami Yoshida	Yumi Suzuki	Yurika Yoshida	Kitami, Japan
Gim Un-chi	Um Min-ji	Seol Ye-eun	Kim Su-ji	Gyeonggi-do, South Korea
Amber Holland	Cindy Ricci	Laura Strong	Debbie Lozinski	Regina, Saskatchewan
Rachel Homan	Emma Miskew	Joanne Courtney	Lisa Weagle	Ottawa, Ontario
Jennifer Jones	Kaitlyn Lawes	Jocelyn Peterman	Dawn McEwen	Winnipeg, Manitoba
Sherry Just	Hanna Anderson	Ellen Redlick	Megan Anderson	Saskatoon, Saskatchewan
Junko Nishimuro (Fourth)	Tori Koana (Skip)	Yuna Kotani	Mao Ishigaki	Fujiyoshida, Japan
Alina Kovaleva	Anastasia Bryzgalova	Uliana Vasilyeva	Ekaterina Kuzmina	Saint Petersburg, Russia
Jiang Yilun (Fourth)	Liu Sijia (Skip)	Dong Ziqi	Jiang Xindi	Harbin, China
Jodi Marthaller	Jody McNabb	Nicole Larson	Valerie Ekelund	Lethbridge, Alberta
Chiaki Matsumura	Ikue Kitazawa	Seina Nakajima	Hasumi Ishigooka	Nagano, Japan
Morgan Muise	Lyndsay Allen	Sarah Evans	Sara Gartner-Frey	Calgary, Alberta
Darcy Robertson	Karen Klein	Vanessa Foster	Theresa Cannon	Winnipeg, Manitoba
Kelsey Rocque	Danielle Schmiemann	Rebecca Konschuh	Jesse Iles	Edmonton, Alberta
Casey Scheidegger	Cary-Anne McTaggart	Jessie Haughian	Kristie Moore	Lethbridge, Alberta
Robyn Silvernagle	Stefanie Lawton	Jessie Hunkin	Kara Thevenot	North Battleford, Saskatchewan
Jamie Sinclair	Alexandra Carlson	Sarah Anderson	Monica Walker	Chaska, United States
Kayla Skrlik	Ashton Skrlik	Hope Sunley	Brenna Bilassy	Calgary, Alberta
Ocean Smart	Robyn Gerrard	Candace Reed	Trina Ball	Edmonton, Alberta
Kaitlin Stubbs	Lesley Pyne	Jody Sutherland	Sarah More	Calgary, Alberta
Karla Thompson	Holly Donaldson	Cassie Savage	Megan Daniels	Kamloops / Vancouver, British Columbia
Rhonda Varnes	Holly Scott	Larisa Murray	Claire Tully	Edmonton, Alberta
Laura Walker	Cathy Overton-Clapham	Lori Olson-Johns	Laine Peters	Edmonton, Alberta

== Knockout bracket ==
=== A event ===
First Knockout
(Manitoba) Jennifer Jones	6
(Alberta) Morgan Muise	1
(Alberta) Jodi Marthaller	6
(Saskatchewan) Robyn Silvernagle	3
(Alberta) Chelsea Carey	8
(Saskatchewan) Sherry Anderson	2
(Manitoba) Kerri Einarson	8
(Alberta) Janais DeJong	1
(Alberta) Laura Walker	7
(Alberta) Ocean Smart	1
(Alberta) Kelsey Rocque	4
(Japan) Tori Koana	8
(United States) Jamie Sinclair	7
(Alberta) Kayla Skrlik	4
(United States) Cory Christensen	7
(Saskatchewan) Amber Holland	8

Quarterfinals
(Manitoba) Jennifer Jones	9
(Alberta) Jodi Marthaller	4
(Alberta) Chelsea Carey	1
(Manitoba) Kerri Einarson	7
(Alberta) Laura Walker	8
(Japan) Tori Koana	7
(United States) Jamie Sinclair	6
(Saskatchewan) Amber Holland	5

Semifinals
(Manitoba) Jennifer Jones	2
(Manitoba) Kerri Einarson	8
(Alberta) Laura Walker	6
(United States) Jamie Sinclair	3

Qualifier 1
(Manitoba) Kerri Einarson	6
(Alberta) Laura Walker	9

First Knockout
(Ontario) Rachel Homan	8
(Saskatchewan) Sherry Just	5
(Japan) Chiaki Matsumura	3
(Russia) Alina Kovaleva	8
(Manitoba) Darcy Robertson	8
(British Columbia) Karla Thompson	7
(Manitoba) Allison Flaxey	7
(Saskatchewan) Kourtney Fesser	6
(Manitoba) Tracy Fleury	6
(Alberta) Kaitlin Stubbs	2
(South Korea) Gim Un-chi	6
(Alberta) Rhonda Varnes	5
(Japan) Satsuki Fujisawa	6
(China) Liu Sijia	4
(Alberta) Casey Scheidegger	4
(British Columbia) Corryn Brown	3

Quarterfinals
(Ontario) Rachel Homan	4
(Russia) Alina Kovaleva	7
(Manitoba) Darcy Robertson	3
(Manitoba) Allison Flaxey	7
(Manitoba) Tracy Fleury	5
(South Korea) Gim Un-chi	2
(Japan) Satsuki Fujisawa	2
(Alberta) Casey Scheidegger	7

Semifinals
(Russia) Alina Kovaleva	6
(Manitoba) Allison Flaxey	3
(Manitoba) Tracy Fleury	2
(Alberta) Casey Scheidegger	7

Qualifier 2
(Russia) Alina Kovaleva	4
(Alberta) Casey Scheidegger	7

=== B event ===
Second Knockout
(Alberta) Morgan Muise	2
(Saskatchewan) Robyn Silvernagle	8
(Alberta) Janais DeJong	7
(Saskatchewan) Sherry Anderson	2

Quarterfinals
(Japan) Satsuki Fujisawa	5
(Saskatchewan) Robyn Silvernagle	3
(South Korea) Gim Un-chi	6
(Alberta) Janais DeJong	5

Semifinals
(Japan) Satsuki Fujisawa	6
(Manitoba) Allison Flaxey	5
(South Korea) Gim Un-chi	6
(United States) Jamie Sinclair	5

To Qualifier 3
(Japan) Satsuki Fujisawa	8
(South Korea) Gim Un-chi	6
Qualifier 3
(Japan) Satsuki Fujisawa	2
(Ontario) Rachel Homan	7

Second Knockout
(Alberta) Ocean Smart	1
(Alberta) Kelsey Rocque	6
(Alberta) Kayla Skrlik	0
(United States) Cory Christensen	6

Quarterfinals
(Manitoba) Darcy Robertson	3
(Alberta) Kelsey Rocque	7
(Ontario) Rachel Homan	7
(United States) Cory Christensen	4

Semifinals
(Alberta) Kelsey Rocque	3
(Ontario) Rachel Homan	10

To Qualifier 3
(Ontario) Rachel Homan	6
(Manitoba) Kerri Einarson	5

Second Knockout
(Saskatchewan) Sherry Just	3
(Japan) Chiaki Matsumura	7
(British Columbia) Karla Thompson	6
(Saskatchewan) Kourtney Fesser	1

Quarterfinals
(Saskatchewan) Amber Holland	2
(Japan) Chiaki Matsumura	3
(Japan) Tori Koana	6
(British Columbia) Karla Thompson	7

Semifinals
(Japan) Chiaki Matsumura	4
(Manitoba) Tracy Fleury	6
(British Columbia) Karla Thompson	1
(Manitoba) Jennifer Jones	7

To Qualifier 4
(Manitoba) Tracy Fleury	4
(Manitoba) Jennifer Jones	3
Qualifier 4
(Manitoba) Tracy Fleury	6
(Russia) Alina Kovaleva	4

Second Knockout
(Alberta) Kaitlin Stubbs	2
(Alberta) Rhonda Varnes	7
(China) Liu Sijia	3
(British Columbia) Corryn Brown	6

Quarterfinals
(Alberta) Chelsea Carey	6
(Alberta) Rhonda Varnes	4
(Alberta) Jodi Marthaller	3
(British Columbia) Corryn Brown	8

Semifinals
(Alberta) Chelsea Carey	11
(British Columbia) Corryn Brown	4

To Qualifier 4
(Alberta) Chelsea Carey	3
(Russia) Alina Kovaleva	6

=== C event ===
Third Knockout
(Alberta) Morgan Muise	6
(Saskatchewan) Sherry Anderson	5
(Alberta) Ocean Smart	2
(Alberta) Kayla Skrlik	6

Quarterfinals
(Japan) Chiaki Matsumura	7
(Alberta) Morgan Muise	1
(British Columbia) Karla Thompson	5
(Alberta) Kayla Skrlik	4

Semifinals
(Japan) Chiaki Matsumura	5
(British Columbia) Karla Thompson	4

Qualifier 5
(Japan) Chiaki Matsumura	6
(Japan) Satsuki Fujisawa	7

Third Knockout
(Manitoba) Darcy Robertson	7
(United States) Cory Christensen	3

Quarterfinals
(Saskatchewan) Robyn Silvernagle	7
(Alberta) Janais DeJong	5
(British Columbia) Corryn Brown	7
(Manitoba) Darcy Robertson	5

Semifinals
(Saskatchewan) Robyn Silvernagle	4
(Alberta) Chelsea Carey	5
(British Columbia) Corryn Brown	3
(Manitoba) Jennifer Jones	9

Qualifier 6
(Alberta) Chelsea Carey	6
(Manitoba) Jennifer Jones	8

Third Knockout
(Alberta) Rhonda Varnes	5
(Alberta) Jodi Marthaller	3

Quarterfinals
(Alberta) Kelsey Rocque	9
(Alberta) Rhonda Varnes	1
(Saskatchewan) Amber Holland	4
(Japan) Tori Koana	8

Semifinals
(Alberta) Kelsey Rocque	7
(South Korea) Gim Un-chi	8
(Japan) Tori Koana	2
(Manitoba) Kerri Einarson	4

Qualifier 7
(South Korea) Gim Un-chi	3
(Manitoba) Kerri Einarson	7

Third Knockout
(Saskatchewan) Sherry Just	9
(Saskatchewan) Kourtney Fesser	2
(Alberta) Kaitlin Stubbs	2
(China) Liu Sijia	8

Quarterfinals
(Manitoba) Allison Flaxey	6
(Saskatchewan) Sherry Just	7
(United States) Jamie Sinclair	6
(China) Liu Sijia	4

Semifinals
(Saskatchewan) Sherry Just	3
(United States) Jamie Sinclair	8

Qualifier 8
(United States) Jamie Sinclair	4
(Russia) Alina Kovaleva	7

== Knockout results ==
All draw times listed in Mountain Time (UTC−07:00).

=== Draw 1 ===
Friday, October 5, 9:30 am

Team	1	2	3	4	5	6	7	8	Final
(Manitoba) Jennifer Jones 🔨	2	1	2	1	0	X	X	X	6
(Alberta) Morgan Muise	0	0	0	0	1	X	X	X	1

Team	1	2	3	4	5	6	7	8	Final
(Alberta) Jodi Marthaller 🔨	0	2	0	1	0	0	3	X	6
(Saskatchewan) Robyn Silvernagle	1	0	1	0	1	0	0	X	3

Team	1	2	3	4	5	6	7	8	Final
(Alberta) Chelsea Carey 🔨	0	2	0	2	0	3	1	X	8
(Saskatchewan) Sherry Anderson	0	0	1	0	1	0	0	X	2

Team	1	2	3	4	5	6	7	8	Final
(Manitoba) Kerri Einarson 🔨	2	0	0	0	2	2	2	X	8
(Alberta) Janais DeJong	0	1	0	0	0	0	0	X	1

Team	1	2	3	4	5	6	7	8	Final
(Alberta) Laura Walker 🔨	1	2	0	0	0	0	4	X	7
(Alberta) Ocean Smart	0	0	0	1	0	0	0	X	1

Team	1	2	3	4	5	6	7	8	Final
(Alberta) Kelsey Rocque	0	2	1	0	0	1	0	X	4
(Japan) Tori Koana 🔨	1	0	0	2	4	0	1	X	8

Team	1	2	3	4	5	6	7	8	Final
(United States) Jamie Sinclair 🔨	1	3	0	0	1	0	2	X	7
(Alberta) Kayla Skrlik	0	0	1	2	0	1	0	X	4

Team	1	2	3	4	5	6	7	8	Final
(United States) Cory Christensen 🔨	0	2	0	1	0	2	2	0	7
(Saskatchewan) Amber Holland	0	0	3	0	2	0	0	3	8

=== Draw 2 ===
Friday, October 5, 1:15 pm

Team	1	2	3	4	5	6	7	8	Final
(Ontario) Rachel Homan	0	2	0	3	0	1	1	1	8
(Saskatchewan) Sherry Just 🔨	2	0	2	0	1	0	0	0	5

Team	1	2	3	4	5	6	7	8	Final
(Japan) Chiaki Matsumura	0	0	2	0	1	0	X	X	3
(Russia) Alina Kovaleva 🔨	2	1	0	2	0	3	X	X	8

Team	1	2	3	4	5	6	7	8	9	Final
(Manitoba) Darcy Robertson 🔨	2	1	0	2	0	1	1	0	1	8
(British Columbia) Karla Thompson	0	0	2	0	4	0	0	1	0	7

Team	1	2	3	4	5	6	7	8	Final
(Manitoba) Allison Flaxey	0	0	2	0	1	1	2	1	7
(Saskatchewan) Kourtney Fesser 🔨	0	3	0	3	0	0	0	0	6

Team	1	2	3	4	5	6	7	8	Final
(Manitoba) Tracy Fleury	2	0	1	0	2	0	1	X	6
(Alberta) Kaitlin Stubbs 🔨	0	1	0	1	0	0	0	X	2

Team	1	2	3	4	5	6	7	8	Final
(South Korea) Gim Un-chi 🔨	2	0	1	0	1	0	1	1	6
(Alberta) Rhonda Varnes	0	2	0	2	0	1	0	0	5

Team	1	2	3	4	5	6	7	8	Final
(Japan) Satsuki Fujisawa	0	1	0	0	0	2	2	1	6
(China) Liu Sijia 🔨	1	0	0	2	1	0	0	0	4

Team	1	2	3	4	5	6	7	8	Final
(Alberta) Casey Scheidegger 🔨	1	2	0	1	0	0	0	X	4
(British Columbia) Corryn Brown	0	0	1	0	1	1	0	X	3

=== Draw 3 ===
Friday, October 5, 5:15 pm

Team	1	2	3	4	5	6	7	8	Final
(Manitoba) Jennifer Jones 🔨	2	0	1	0	2	1	1	2	9
(Alberta) Jodi Marthaller	0	2	0	2	0	0	0	0	4

Team	1	2	3	4	5	6	7	8	Final
(Alberta) Chelsea Carey	0	1	0	0	0	X	X	X	1
(Manitoba) Kerri Einarson 🔨	1	0	2	2	2	X	X	X	7

Team	1	2	3	4	5	6	7	8	Final
(Alberta) Laura Walker	0	3	0	2	0	1	0	2	8
(Japan) Tori Koana 🔨	1	0	1	0	2	0	3	0	7

Team	1	2	3	4	5	6	7	8	Final
(United States) Jamie Sinclair 🔨	1	0	1	1	1	0	2	0	6
(Saskatchewan) Amber Holland	0	1	0	0	0	3	0	1	5

Team	1	2	3	4	5	6	7	8	Final
(Alberta) Morgan Muise	0	0	1	0	1	0	X	X	2
(Saskatchewan) Robyn Silvernagle 🔨	2	3	0	2	0	1	X	X	8

Team	1	2	3	4	5	6	7	8	Final
(Alberta) Janais DeJong	0	3	0	1	3	X	X	X	7
(Saskatchewan) Sherry Anderson 🔨	2	0	0	0	0	X	X	X	2

Team	1	2	3	4	5	6	7	8	Final
(Alberta) Ocean Smart	0	1	0	0	X	X	X	X	1
(Alberta) Kelsey Rocque 🔨	2	0	2	2	X	X	X	X	6

Team	1	2	3	4	5	6	7	8	Final
(Alberta) Kayla Skrlik	0	0	0	X	X	X	X	X	0
(United States) Cory Christensen 🔨	3	1	2	X	X	X	X	X	6

=== Draw 4 ===
Friday, October 5, 9:00 pm

Team	1	2	3	4	5	6	7	8	Final
(Ontario) Rachel Homan	0	1	0	1	1	1	0	0	4
(Russia) Alina Kovaleva 🔨	3	0	1	0	0	0	0	3	7

Team	1	2	3	4	5	6	7	8	Final
(Manitoba) Darcy Robertson 🔨	0	1	0	1	0	0	1	0	3
(Manitoba) Allison Flaxey	0	0	1	0	2	0	0	4	7

Team	1	2	3	4	5	6	7	8	Final
(Manitoba) Tracy Fleury 🔨	0	1	1	0	2	1	0	X	5
(South Korea) Gim Un-chi	0	0	0	1	0	0	1	X	2

Team	1	2	3	4	5	6	7	8	Final
(Japan) Satsuki Fujisawa	0	1	0	0	0	1	0	X	2
(Alberta) Casey Scheidegger 🔨	1	0	2	1	1	0	2	X	7

Team	1	2	3	4	5	6	7	8	Final
(Saskatchewan) Sherry Just 🔨	0	0	0	2	0	1	0	X	3
(Japan) Chiaki Matsumura	0	1	1	0	4	0	1	X	7

Team	1	2	3	4	5	6	7	8	Final
(British Columbia) Karla Thompson	0	0	2	1	1	2	X	X	6
(Saskatchewan) Kourtney Fesser 🔨	1	0	0	0	0	0	X	X	1

Team	1	2	3	4	5	6	7	8	Final
(Alberta) Kaitlin Stubbs 🔨	0	0	0	2	0	0	X	X	2
(Alberta) Rhonda Varnes	1	1	2	0	1	2	X	X	7

Team	1	2	3	4	5	6	7	8	Final
(China) Liu Sijia 🔨	1	0	1	0	0	1	X	X	3
(British Columbia) Corryn Brown	0	3	0	2	1	0	X	X	6

=== Draw 5 ===
Saturday, October 6, 9:00 am

Team	1	2	3	4	5	6	7	8	Final
(Manitoba) Jennifer Jones	0	0	0	0	1	1	0	X	2
(Manitoba) Kerri Einarson 🔨	0	3	1	2	0	0	2	X	8

Team	1	2	3	4	5	6	7	8	Final
(Alberta) Laura Walker	0	2	0	1	0	1	2	X	6
(United States) Jamie Sinclair 🔨	1	0	1	0	1	0	0	X	3

Team	1	2	3	4	5	6	7	8	Final
(Japan) Satsuki Fujisawa 🔨	0	2	0	1	1	0	0	1	5
(Saskatchewan) Robyn Silvernagle	0	0	1	0	0	2	0	0	3

Team	1	2	3	4	5	6	7	8	Final
(South Korea) Gim Un-chi	0	1	0	2	1	0	0	2	6
(Alberta) Janais DeJong 🔨	1	0	1	0	0	2	1	0	5

Team	1	2	3	4	5	6	7	8	Final
(Manitoba) Darcy Robertson	0	0	0	2	0	1	0	X	3
(Alberta) Kelsey Rocque 🔨	2	1	1	0	2	0	1	X	7

Team	1	2	3	4	5	6	7	8	Final
(Ontario) Rachel Homan 🔨	1	0	3	0	0	3	0	X	7
(United States) Cory Christensen	0	1	0	0	2	0	1	X	4

=== Draw 6 ===
Saturday, October 6, 12:45 pm

Team	1	2	3	4	5	6	7	8	Final
(Russia) Alina Kovaleva	0	2	1	0	0	3	0	X	6
(Manitoba) Allison Flaxey 🔨	1	0	0	0	1	0	1	X	3

Team	1	2	3	4	5	6	7	8	Final
(Manitoba) Tracy Fleury	0	0	2	0	0	0	0	X	2
(Alberta) Casey Scheidegger 🔨	0	1	0	0	2	1	3	X	7

Team	1	2	3	4	5	6	7	8	Final
(Saskatchewan) Amber Holland	0	0	0	1	1	0	0	0	2
(Japan) Chiaki Matsumura 🔨	0	1	0	0	0	1	1	0	3

Team	1	2	3	4	5	6	7	8	Final
(Japan) Tori Koana	0	1	0	2	0	2	1	0	6
(British Columbia) Karla Thompson 🔨	2	0	1	0	3	0	0	1	7

Team	1	2	3	4	5	6	7	8	Final
(Alberta) Chelsea Carey 🔨	1	0	2	1	0	1	0	1	6
(Alberta) Rhonda Varnes	0	1	0	0	1	0	2	0	4

Team	1	2	3	4	5	6	7	8	Final
(Alberta) Jodi Marthaller 🔨	1	0	1	0	0	1	0	X	3
(British Columbia) Corryn Brown	0	1	0	1	4	0	2	X	8

=== Draw 7 ===
Saturday, October 6, 4:30 pm

Team	1	2	3	4	5	6	7	8	Final
(Manitoba) Kerri Einarson 🔨	0	0	1	2	1	0	2	0	6
(Alberta) Laura Walker	1	1	0	0	0	4	0	3	9

Team	1	2	3	4	5	6	7	8	Final
(Japan) Satsuki Fujisawa 🔨	1	3	0	0	1	1	0	0	6
(Manitoba) Allison Flaxey	0	0	3	0	0	0	1	1	5

Team	1	2	3	4	5	6	7	8	Final
(South Korea) Gim Un-chi	0	2	0	1	0	1	0	2	6
(United States) Jamie Sinclair 🔨	1	0	1	0	1	0	2	0	5

Team	1	2	3	4	5	6	7	8	Final
(Alberta) Kelsey Rocque	0	1	0	2	0	0	X	X	3
(Ontario) Rachel Homan 🔨	2	0	2	0	3	3	X	X	10

Team	1	2	3	4	5	6	7	8	Final
(Manitoba) Darcy Robertson	2	3	1	0	0	1	0	X	7
(United States) Cory Christensen 🔨	0	0	0	1	1	0	1	X	3

Team	1	2	3	4	5	6	7	8	Final
(Alberta) Rhonda Varnes 🔨	1	0	0	0	1	1	0	2	5
(Alberta) Jodi Marthaller	0	1	1	1	0	0	0	0	3

Team	1	2	3	4	5	6	7	8	Final
(Alberta) Kaitlin Stubbs	0	1	0	1	0	0	X	X	2
(China) Liu Sijia 🔨	1	0	2	0	4	1	X	X	8

=== Draw 8 ===
Saturday, October 6, 8:15 pm

Team	1	2	3	4	5	6	7	8	Final
(Russia) Alina Kovaleva	0	0	1	0	2	0	1	X	4
(Alberta) Casey Scheidegger 🔨	0	1	0	3	0	3	0	X	7

Team	1	2	3	4	5	6	7	8	Final
(Japan) Chiaki Matsumura	0	0	2	0	0	1	1	0	4
(Manitoba) Tracy Fleury 🔨	0	1	0	3	1	0	0	1	6

Team	1	2	3	4	5	6	7	8	Final
(British Columbia) Karla Thompson	0	0	0	1	0	X	X	X	1
(Manitoba) Jennifer Jones 🔨	2	3	0	0	2	X	X	X	7

Team	1	2	3	4	5	6	7	8	Final
(Alberta) Chelsea Carey 🔨	4	0	2	0	2	3	X	X	11
(British Columbia) Corryn Brown	0	2	0	2	0	0	X	X	4

Team	1	2	3	4	5	6	7	8	9	Final
(Alberta) Morgan Muise 🔨	0	0	0	0	2	1	2	0	1	6
(Saskatchewan) Sherry Anderson	1	1	0	1	0	0	0	2	0	5

Team	1	2	3	4	5	6	7	8	Final
(Alberta) Ocean Smart	0	0	0	1	0	0	1	0	2
(Alberta) Kayla Skrlik 🔨	2	1	0	0	1	1	0	1	6

Team	1	2	3	4	5	6	7	8	Final
(Saskatchewan) Sherry Just 🔨	0	4	2	2	0	1	X	X	9
(Saskatchewan) Kourtney Fesser	0	0	0	0	2	0	X	X	2

=== Draw 9 ===
Sunday, October 7, 9:00 am

Team	1	2	3	4	5	6	7	8	Final
(Japan) Satsuki Fujisawa 🔨	2	2	0	1	0	0	2	1	8
(South Korea) Gim Un-chi	0	0	1	0	3	2	0	0	6

Team	1	2	3	4	5	6	7	8	Final
(Ontario) Rachel Homan 🔨	1	0	2	0	1	1	0	1	6
(Manitoba) Kerri Einarson	0	2	0	1	0	0	2	0	5

Team	1	2	3	4	5	6	7	8	9	Final
(Saskatchewan) Robyn Silvernagle 🔨	1	0	0	2	0	2	0	0	2	7
(Alberta) Janais DeJong	0	2	0	0	1	0	1	1	0	5

Team	1	2	3	4	5	6	7	8	9	Final
(British Columbia) Corryn Brown	1	0	0	2	0	2	0	0	2	7
(Manitoba) Darcy Robertson 🔨	0	2	0	0	1	0	1	1	0	5

Team	1	2	3	4	5	6	7	8	Final
(Alberta) Kelsey Rocque 🔨	3	3	1	0	2	X	X	X	9
(Alberta) Rhonda Varnes	0	0	0	1	0	X	X	X	1

Team	1	2	3	4	5	6	7	8	Final
(Saskatchewan) Amber Holland	2	0	1	0	1	0	0	X	4
(Japan) Tori Koana 🔨	0	2	0	2	0	3	1	X	8

Team	1	2	3	4	5	6	7	8	Final
(United States) Jamie Sinclair 🔨	1	0	0	0	1	1	0	3	6
(China) Liu Sijia	0	1	0	1	0	0	2	0	4

=== Draw 10 ===
Sunday, October 7, 12:45 pm

Team	1	2	3	4	5	6	7	8	Final
(Manitoba) Tracy Fleury	0	1	1	0	0	1	0	1	4
(Manitoba) Jennifer Jones 🔨	1	0	0	0	1	0	1	0	3

Team	1	2	3	4	5	6	7	8	9	Final
(Alberta) Chelsea Carey	0	0	1	0	1	0	0	1	0	3
(Russia) Alina Kovaleva 🔨	0	1	0	1	0	0	1	0	3	6

Team	1	2	3	4	5	6	7	8	Final
(Japan) Satsuki Fujisawa	0	1	0	0	1	0	0	X	2
(Ontario) Rachel Homan 🔨	2	0	0	3	0	1	1	X	7

Team	1	2	3	4	5	6	7	8	Final
(Japan) Chiaki Matsumura 🔨	2	1	0	4	X	X	X	X	7
(Alberta) Morgan Muise	0	0	1	0	X	X	X	X	1

Team	1	2	3	4	5	6	7	8	Final
(British Columbia) Karla Thompson	0	1	0	2	0	1	0	1	5
(Alberta) Kayla Skrlik 🔨	1	0	1	0	1	0	1	0	4

Team	1	2	3	4	5	6	7	8	9	Final
(Manitoba) Allison Flaxey	0	2	0	2	0	1	0	1	0	6
(Saskatchewan) Sherry Just 🔨	1	0	1	0	1	0	3	0	1	7

=== Draw 11 ===
Sunday, October 7, 4:30 pm

Team	1	2	3	4	5	6	7	8	Final
(Manitoba) Tracy Fleury	0	0	2	0	0	3	0	1	6
(Russia) Alina Kovaleva 🔨	1	0	0	1	1	0	1	0	4

Team	1	2	3	4	5	6	7	8	Final
(Japan) Chiaki Matsumura 🔨	2	0	1	0	1	0	0	1	5
(British Columbia) Karla Thompson	0	2	0	1	0	1	0	0	4

Team	1	2	3	4	5	6	7	8	Final
(Saskatchewan) Robyn Silvernagle	1	0	0	0	1	0	2	0	4
(Alberta) Chelsea Carey 🔨	0	2	0	1	0	1	0	1	5

Team	1	2	3	4	5	6	7	8	Final
(British Columbia) Corryn Brown 🔨	1	0	0	0	0	2	0	X	3
(Manitoba) Jennifer Jones	0	2	1	1	2	0	3	X	9

Team	1	2	3	4	5	6	7	8	9	Final
(Alberta) Kelsey Rocque	0	1	0	0	2	2	0	2	0	7
(South Korea) Gim Un-chi 🔨	3	0	2	1	0	0	1	0	1	8

Team	1	2	3	4	5	6	7	8	Final
(Japan) Tori Koana 🔨	0	0	1	0	0	1	0	X	2
(Manitoba) Kerri Einarson	1	1	0	0	1	0	1	X	4

Team	1	2	3	4	5	6	7	8	Final
(Saskatchewan) Sherry Just	0	1	0	1	0	1	X	X	3
(United States) Jamie Sinclair 🔨	3	0	2	0	3	0	X	X	8

=== Draw 12 ===
Sunday, October 7, 8:15 pm

Team	1	2	3	4	5	6	7	8	Final
(Japan) Chiaki Matsumura 🔨	1	0	1	0	2	0	0	2	6
(Japan) Satsuki Fujisawa	0	2	0	2	0	2	1	0	7

Team	1	2	3	4	5	6	7	8	Final
(Alberta) Chelsea Carey 🔨	1	0	0	2	0	3	0	0	6
(Manitoba) Jennifer Jones	0	2	1	0	1	0	3	1	8

Team	1	2	3	4	5	6	7	8	Final
(South Korea) Gim Un-chi	0	0	1	0	0	2	0	X	3
(Manitoba) Kerri Einarson 🔨	0	2	0	1	1	0	3	X	7

Team	1	2	3	4	5	6	7	8	Final
(United States) Jamie Sinclair	0	1	0	1	0	2	X	X	4
(Russia) Alina Kovaleva 🔨	2	0	4	0	1	0	X	X	7

== Playoffs ==
Quarterfinals
A1	(Alberta) Laura Walker	3
C2	(Manitoba) Jennifer Jones	6
C1	(Japan) Satsuki Fujisawa	2
B2	(Manitoba) Tracy Fleury	7
B1	(Ontario) Rachel Homan	7
C4	(Russia) Alina Kovaleva	5
C3	(Manitoba) Kerri Einarson	5
A2	(Alberta) Casey Scheidegger	4

Semifinals
C2	(Manitoba) Jennifer Jones	8
B2	(Manitoba) Tracy Fleury	6
B1	(Ontario) Rachel Homan	4
C3	(Manitoba) Kerri Einarson	7

Final
C2	(Manitoba) Jennifer Jones	5
C3	(Manitoba) Kerri Einarson	7

=== Quarterfinals ===
Monday, October 8, 9:00 am

Sheet 2	1	2	3	4	5	6	7	8	Final
(Japan) Satsuki Fujisawa	1	0	0	0	1	0	0	X	2
(Manitoba) Tracy Fleury 🔨	0	3	0	1	0	1	2	X	7

Sheet 3	1	2	3	4	5	6	7	8	Final
(Alberta) Laura Walker 🔨	1	0	0	0	1	0	1	X	3
(Manitoba) Jennifer Jones	0	1	1	1	0	3	0	X	6

Sheet 6	1	2	3	4	5	6	7	8	Final
(Manitoba) Kerri Einarson	0	0	1	0	0	1	1	2	5
(Alberta) Casey Scheidegger 🔨	0	2	0	1	1	0	0	0	4

Sheet 7	1	2	3	4	5	6	7	8	Final
(Ontario) Rachel Homan 🔨	1	0	0	3	0	2	0	1	7
(Russia) Alina Kovaleva	0	0	2	0	2	0	1	0	5

=== Semifinals ===
Monday, October 8, 12:15 pm

Sheet 4	1	2	3	4	5	6	7	8	Final
(Ontario) Rachel Homan 🔨	0	1	0	2	0	1	0	X	4
(Manitoba) Kerri Einarson	0	0	3	0	1	0	3	X	7

Sheet 6	1	2	3	4	5	6	7	8	Final
(Manitoba) Jennifer Jones	0	2	0	2	0	3	0	1	8
(Manitoba) Tracy Fleury 🔨	2	0	1	0	1	0	2	0	6

=== Final ===
Monday, October 8, 3:30 pm

Sheet 5	1	2	3	4	5	6	7	8	Final
(Manitoba) Jennifer Jones 🔨	0	1	1	0	2	0	1	0	5
(Manitoba) Kerri Einarson	2	0	0	2	0	2	0	1	7
