= 2017 Colonial Square Ladies Classic =

- Host city: Saskatoon, Saskatchewan
- Arena: Nutana Curling Club
- Dates: Sept. 22-25
- Winner: (Manitoba) Shannon Birchard
- Curling club: St. Vital CC, Winnipeg
- Skip: Shannon Birchard
- Third: Nicole Sigvaldason
- Second: Sheyna Andries
- Lead: Mariah Mondor
- Finalist: (Manitoba) Jennifer Jones

The 2017 Colonial Square Ladies Classic was held from September 22 to 25 at the Nutana Curling Club in Saskatoon, Saskatchewan, as part of the 2017–18 World Curling Tour. The event was in a Triple Knockout format.

== Teams ==
The teams are listed as follows:

Skip	Third	Second	Lead	Locale
Sherry Anderson	Kourtney Fesser	Krista Fesser	Karlee Korchinski	Saskatoon, Saskatchewan
Brett Barber	Alyssa Despins	Kristin Ochitwa	Robyn Despins	Biggar, Saskatchewan
Shannon Birchard	Nicole Sigvaldason	Sheyna Andries	Mariah Mondor	Winnipeg, Manitoba
Chantelle Eberle	Christie Gamble	Larisa Murray	Haylee Jamieson	Regina, Saskatchewan
Allison Flaxey	Clancy Grandy	Lynn Kreviazuk	Morgan Court	Caledon, Ontario
Shalon Fleming	Chelsey Peterson	Becca Anderson	Carla Anaka	Regina, Saskatchewan
Satsuki Fujisawa	Chinami Yoshida	Yumi Suzuki	Yurika Yoshida	Kitami, Japan
Gim Un-chi	Um Min-ji	Seol Ye-eun	Yeom Yoon-jung	Uijeongbu, South Korea
Claire Hamilton	Gina Aitken	Rachael Halliday	Rachel Hannen	Edinburgh, Scotland
Anna Hasselborg	Sara McManus	Agnes Knochenhauer	Sofia Mabergs	Sundbyberg, Sweden
Amber Holland	Sherri Singler	Laura Strong	Debbie Lozinski	Regina, Saskatchewan
Ashley Howard	Carly Howard	Kim Schneider	Ashley Williamson	Regina, Saskatchewan
Jennifer Jones	Kaitlyn Lawes	Jill Officer	Dawn McEwen	Winnipeg, Manitoba
Nancy Martin	Alyssa Jenkins	Meaghan Frerichs	Teresa Waterfield	Saskatoon, Saskatchewan
Robyn Silvernagle	Jolene Campbell	Dayna Demers	Kara Thevenot	North Battleford, Saskatchewan
Rhonda Varnes	Jenna Loder	Katherine Doerksen	Danielle Robinson	Winnipeg, Manitoba

== Knockout Draw Brackets ==
The draw is listed as follows:

=== A Event ===
Knockout 1		Semifinals		Qualifier 1
(Manitoba) Jennifer Jones	11
(Saskatchewan) Brett Barber	2	(Manitoba) Jennifer Jones	7
(Saskatchewan) Robyn Silvernagle	5	(Saskatchewan) Robyn Silvernagle	2
(Saskatchewan) Nancy Martin	4			(Manitoba) Jennifer Jones	2
(Japan) Satsuki Fujisawa	5			(Manitoba) Shannon Birchard	4
(Saskatchewan) Ashley Howard	7	(Saskatchewan) Ashley Howard	1
(Manitoba) Shannon Birchard	7	(Manitoba) Shannon Birchard	6
(Saskatchewan) Amber Holland	3

Quarterfinals		Semifinals		Qualifier 2
(Sweden) Anna Hasselborg	7
(Saskatchewan) Shalon Fleming	1	(Sweden) Anna Hasselborg	7
(Manitoba) Rhonda Varnes	5	(Saskatchewan) Sherry Anderson	5
(Saskatchewan) Sherry Anderson	7			(Sweden) Anna Hasselborg	5
(Ontario) Allison Flaxey	7			(Ontario) Allison Flaxey	3
(Scotland) Claire Hamilton	6	(Ontario) Allison Flaxey	5
(South Korea) Gim Un-chi	6	(South Korea) Gim Un-chi	4
(Saskatchewan) Chantelle Eberle	5

=== B Event ===
Quarterfinals		Semifinals		Qualifier 3
(Saskatchewan) Brett Barber	5
(Saskatchewan) Nancy Martin	4	(Saskatchewan) Brett Barber	2
(Japan) Satsuki Fujisawa	5	(Japan) Satsuki Fujisawa	8
(Saskatchewan) Amber Holland	4			(Japan) Satsuki Fujisawa	5
				(Ontario) Allison Flaxey	4

Quarterfinals		Semifinals		Qualifier 4
(Saskatchewan) Shalon Flemming	5
(Manitoba) Rhonda Varnes	4	(Saskatchewan) Shalon Flemming	2
(Scotland) Claire Hamilton	5	(Scotland) Claire Hamilton	6
(Saskatchewan) Chantelle Eberle	4			(Scotland) Claire Hamilton	1
				(Manitoba) Jennifer Jones	8

Semifinals		Qualifier 5
(Saskatchewan) Robyn Silvernagle	6
(Saskatchewan) Ashley Howard	5	(Saskatchewan) Robyn Silvernagle	5
(Saskatchewan) Sherry Anderson	2	(South Korea) Gim Un-chi	4
(South Korea) Gim Un-chi	5

=== C Event ===
Quarterfinals		Semifinals		Qualifier 6
(Saskatchewan) Nancy Martin	5
(Saskatchewan) Amber Holland	6	(Saskatchewan) Amber Holland	6
		(Saskatchewan) Sherry Anderson	5
				(Scotland) Claire Hamilton	3
				(Saskatchewan) Amber Holland	8

Quarterfinals		Semifinals		Qualifier 7
(Manitoba) Rhonda Varnes	7
(Saskatchewan) Chantelle Eberle	4	(Manitoba) Rhonda Varnes	1
		(Saskatchewan) Ashley Howard	6
				(Saskatchewan) Ashley Howard	3
				(Ontario) Allison Flaxey	7

Semifinals		Qualifier 8
(Saskatchewan) Brett Barber	2
(Saskatchewan) Shalon Flemming	11	(Saskatchewan) Shalon Flemming	2
		(South Korea) Gim Un-chi	7

== Playoffs ==
Quarterfinals
(Sweden) Anna Hasselborg	6
(Saskatchewan) Amber Holland	1
(Japan) Satsuki Fujisawa	4
(Manitoba) Jennifer Jones	6
(Manitoba) Shannon Birchard	8
(South Korea) Gim Un-chi	2
(Saskatchewan) Robyn Silvernagle	5
(Ontario) Allison Flaxey	7

Semifinals
(Sweden) Anna Hasselborg	2
(Manitoba) Jennifer Jones	5
(Manitoba) Shannon Birchard	7
(Ontario) Allison Flaxey	5

Final
(Manitoba) Jennifer Jones	6
(Manitoba) Shannon Birchard	8
