= 2017 Boundary Ford Curling Classic =

World Curling Tour event

- Host city: Lloydminster, Saskatchewan
- Arena: Lloydminster Curling Club
- Dates: November 24 –27
- Winner: (Saskatchewan) Robyn Silvernagle
- Curling club: Twin Rivers Curling Club, North Battleford, Saskatchewan
- Skip: Robyn Silvernagle
- Third: Jolene Campbell
- Second: Dayna Demers
- Lead: Kara Thevenot
- Finalist: (Saskatchewan) Chantelle Eberle

The 2017 Boundary Ford Curling Classic was held from November 24 to 27 at the Lloydminster Curling Club in Lloydminster, Saskatchewan as part of the 2017–18 World Curling Tour. The event was held in a triple knockout format.

== Teams ==
Teams are listed as follows:

Skip	Third	Second	Lead	Locale
Brett Barber	Alyssa Despins	Kristen Ochitwa	Robyn Despins	Biggar, Saskatchewan
Chantelle Eberle	Christie Gamble	Larisa Murray	Haylee Jameson	Regina, Saskatchewan
Sara England	Shelby Brandt	Stasia Wisniewski	Mackenzie Schwartz	Regina, Saskatchewan
Rachel Fritzler	Jenna Hope	Jessica Mitchell	Ashley Lang	Saskatoon, Saskatchewan
Teryn Hamilton	Vanessa Murray	Krista Shortridge	Kristen Krassman	Calgary, Alberta
Krysta Hilker	Katie Morrissey	Kim Louitt	Heather Steele	Edmonton, Alberta
Lindsay Makichuk	Jennifer Van Wieren	Jen Person	Tiffany Steuber	Edmonton, Alberta
Jodi Marthaller	Jody McNabb	Nicole Larson	Valerie Ekelund	Lethbridge, Alberta
Nancy Martin	Alyssa Jenkins	Meaghan Frerichs	Teresa Waterfield	Saskatoon, Saskatchewan
Deanne Nichol	Karynn Flory	Brittany Zelmer	Jennifer Sheehan	Edmonton, Alberta
Holly Scott	Megan Anderson	Candace Read	Trina Ball	Edmonton, Alberta
Mandy Selzer	Erin Barnhart	Sherry Just	Donda-Lee Deis	Balgonie, Saskatchewan
Robyn Silvernagle	Jolene Campbell	Dayna Demers	Kara Thevenot	North Battleford, Saskatchewan
Nola Zingel	Heather Kuntz	Jill Watson	Melissa Butler	Lloydminster, Alberta

== Knockout results ==
The draw is listed as follows:

=== A event ===
First Knockout		Semifinals		Qualifier 1
(Saskatchewan) Brett Barber	10
(Saskatchewan) Rachel Fritzler	2	(Saskatchewan) Robyn Silvernagle	4
(Saskatchewan) Nancy Martin	7	(Saskatchewan) Brett Barber	8
(Alberta) Nola Zingel	2			(Saskatchewan) Brett Barber	8
(Alberta) Krysta Hikker	3			(Alberta) Holly Scott	2
(Alberta) Holly Scott	8	(Saskatchewan) Nancy Martin	4
		(Alberta) Holly Scott	10

First Knockout		Semifinals		Qualifier 2
(Alberta) Lindsay Makichuk	7
(Saskatchewan) Sara England	5	(Saskatchewan) Chantelle Eberle	11
(Alberta) Jodi Marthaller	11	(Alberta) Lindsay Makichuk	4
(Alberta) Teryn Hamilton	5			(Saskatchewan) Chantelle Eberle	8
(Saskatchewan) Mandy Selzer	5			(Alberta) Deanne Nichol	7
(Alberta) Deanne Nichol	8	(Alberta) Jodi Marthaller	5
		(Alberta) Deanne Nichol	10

=== B event ===
Second Knockout		Semifinals		Qualifier 3
(Alberta) Nola Zingel	7
(Alberta) Krysta Hikker	4	(Alberta) Nola Zingel	6
		(Saskatchewan) Rachel Fritzler	9
				(Saskatchewan) Rachel Fritzler	8
				(Alberta) Deanne Nichol	6

Second Knockout		Semifinals		Qualifier 4
(Alberta) Teryn Hamilton	5
(Saskatchewan) Mandy Selzer	7	(Saskatchewan) Mandy Selzer	4
		(Saskatchewan) Robyn Silvernagle	10
				(Saskatchewan) Robyn Silvernagle	9
				(Alberta) Holly Scott	3

Second Knockout		Qualifier 5
(Saskatchewan) Nancy Martin	10
(Saskatchewan) Sara England	2	(Saskatchewan) Nancy Martin	7
(Alberta) Lindsay Makichuk	7	(Alberta) Jodi Marthaller	6
(Alberta) Jodi Marthaller	8

=== C event ===
Third Knockout		Qualifier 6
(Alberta) Lindsay Makichuk	6
(Alberta) Krysta Hikker	9	(Alberta) Krysta Hikker	10
		(Alberta) Jodi Marthaller	4

Third Knockout		Qualifier 7
(Saskatchewan) Sara England	3
(Alberta) Teryn Hamilton	10	(Alberta) Teryn Hamilton	4
		(Alberta) Holly Scott	7

Third Knockout		Qualifier 8
(Alberta) Nola Zingel	4
(Saskatchewan) Mandy Selzer	7	(Saskatchewan) Mandy Selzer	10
		(Alberta) Deanne Nichol	3

== Playoffs ==
Quarterfinals
(Saskatchewan) Brett Barber	9
(Saskatchewan) Mandy Selzer	10
(Saskatchewan) Robyn Silvernagle	10
(Saskatchewan) Nancy Martin	4
(Saskatchewan) Chantelle Eberle	6
(Alberta) Holly Scott	5
(Saskatchewan) Rachel Fritzler	8
(Alberta) Krysta Hikker	7

Semifinals
(Saskatchewan) Mandy Selzer	5
(Saskatchewan) Robyn Silvernagle	8
(Saskatchewan) Chantelle Eberle	8
(Saskatchewan) Rachel Fritzler	2

Final
(Saskatchewan) Robyn Silvernagle	6
(Saskatchewan) Chantelle Eberle	4

=== Final ===
Sunday, November 26

Team	1	2	3	4	5	6	7	8	9	10	Final
(Saskatchewan) Robyn Silvernagle	1	1	0	1	0	0	0	2	1	X	6
(Saskatchewan) Chantelle Eberle	0	0	1	0	0	1	2	0	0	X	4
