= 2016 Saskatchewan Scotties Tournament of Hearts =

The 2016 Viterra Saskatchewan Scotties Tournament of Hearts, the provincial women's curling championship of Saskatchewan was held January 27 to 31 at the Prince Albert Golf & Curling Club in Prince Albert. The winning Jolene Campbell team represented Saskatchewan at the 2016 Scotties Tournament of Hearts in Grande Prairie, Alberta.

== Teams ==
The teams are listed as follows:

Skip	Third	Second	Lead	Club(s)
Sherry Anderson	Jessica Hanson	Elyse Lafrance	Brie Spilchen	Nutana Curling Club, Saskatoon
Penny Barker	Deanna Doig	Melissa Hoffman	Danielle Sicinski	Moose Jaw Ford Curling Centre, Moose Jaw
Jolene Campbell	Ashley Howard	Callan Hamon	Ashley Williamson	Highland Curling Club, Regina
Kelsey Dutton	Kaitlyn Bowman	Chelsey Peterson	Ashley Resler	Swift Current Curling Club, Swift Current
Michelle Englot	Candace Chisholm	Stephanie Schmidt	Brooklyn Lemon	Highland Curling Club, Regina
Nancy Inglis	Carla Anaka	Jade Ivan	Brandi Clarke	Callie Curling Club, Regina
Stefanie Lawton	Trish Paulsen	Sherri Singler	Marliese Kasner	Nutana Curling Club, Saskatoon
Nancy Martin	Taryn Schachtel	Sherry Just	Jinaye Yanota	Martensville Curling Club, Martensville
Cindy Ricci	Kristie Moore (skip)	Larisa Murray	Debbie Lozinski	Callie Curling Club, Regina
Kim Schneider	Laura Strong	Natalie Bloomfield	Kristy Johnson	Kronau Curling Club, Kronau
Mandy Selzer	Erin Selzer	Kristen Mitchell	Megan Selzer	Balgonie Curling Club, Balgonie
Robyn Silvernagle	Dayna Demers	Cristina Goertzen	Kara Kilden	Twin Rivers Curling Club, North Battleford

== Round robin standings ==
Key
Teams to Playoffs	Teams to Tiebreakers

Pool A	W	L
Lawton	5	0
Campbell	4	1
Moore	3	2
Inglis	2	3
Martin	1	4
Schneider	0	5

Pool B	W	L
Silvernagle	4	1
Anderson	3	2
Englot	3	2
Barker	3	2
Dutton	2	3
Selzer	0	5

== Scores ==
=== January 27 ===
Draw 1

- Dutton 5-3 Selzer
- Inglis 8-2 Martin

Draw 2

- Englot 7-4 Barker
- Campbell 6-5 Moore
- Lawton 9-5 Schneider
- Silvernagle 6-5 Anderson

=== January 28 ===
Draw 3

- Campbell 10-2 Inglis
- Martin 8-3 Schneider
- Dutton 10-3 Anderson
- Barker 8-3 Selzer

Draw 4

- Silvernagle 9-1 Selzer
- Lawton 8-4 Inglis
- Moore 7-6 Martin
- Englot 7-3 Dutton

=== January 29 ===
Draw 5

- Lawton 8-5 Martin
- Silvernagle 5-3 Dutton
- Englot 6-3 Selzer
- Moore 6-4 Inglis

Draw 6

- Silvernagle 10-8 Englot
- Anderson 7-6 Barker
- Lawton 7-3 Moore
- Campbell 10-2 Schneider

Draw 7

- Anderson 11-10 Selzer
- Inglis 5-2 Schneider
- Campbell 8-7 Martin
- Barker 10-1 Dutton

=== January 30 ===
Draw 8

- Moore 7-3 Schneider
- Anderson 7-2 Englot
- Barker 8-7 Silvernagle
- Lawton 7-1 Campbell

== Tiebreakers ==
Tiebreaker 1			Tiebreaker 2
			1	Anderson	5
2	Englot	8	2	Englot	7
3	Barker	1

== Playoffs ==
Page playoff system
A1	Stefanie Lawton	5
B1	Robyn Silvernagle	4
A2	Jolene Campbell	7
B2	Michelle Englot	5

Semifinal
B1	Robyn Silvernagle	4
A2	Jolene Campbell	6

Final
A1	Stefanie Lawton	4
A2	Jolene Campbell	7

=== A1 vs B1 ===
Saturday, January 30, 7:30pm

Team	1	2	3	4	5	6	7	8	9	10	Final
Stefanie Lawton	0	1	0	0	2	0	0	0	0	2	5
Robyn Silvernagle	0	0	0	1	0	1	1	1	0	0	4

=== A2 vs B2 ===
Sunday, January 31, 10:00 am

Team	1	2	3	4	5	6	7	8	9	10	Final
Jolene Campbell	1	0	1	1	0	2	0	1	0	1	7
Michelle Englot	0	1	0	0	2	0	1	0	1	0	5

=== Semifinal ===
Sunday, January 31, 1:00 pm

Team	1	2	3	4	5	6	7	8	9	10	Final
Jolene Campbell	0	1	0	0	3	0	0	1	0	1	6
Robyn Silvernagle	0	0	1	1	0	2	0	0	0	0	4

=== Final ===
Sunday, January 31, 6:00 pm

Team	1	2	3	4	5	6	7	8	9	10	Final
Stefanie Lawton	0	1	0	0	1	0	0	2	0	X	4
Jolene Campbell	0	0	3	2	0	1	0	0	1	X	7

2016 Saskatchewan Scotties Tournament of Hearts

Jolene Campbell
1st Saskatchewan Provincial Championship title
