= Dayna Demmans =

Canadian curler

- Curler
- Born: October 31, 1986 (age 40); Meadow Lake, Saskatchewan

Team
- Curling club: Highland CC, Regina, SK
- Skip: Sarah Daniels
- Third: Abby Ackland
- Second: Calissa Daly
- Lead: Dayna Demmans

Curling career
- Member Association: Saskatchewan (2009–2013; 2014–2022; 2025–2026); Alberta (2013–2014; 2022–2024); British Columbia (2026–present)
- Hearts: 1 (2026)
- Top CTRS ranking: 15th (2025–26)

Dayna Demmans, previously known as Dayna Demers (born October 31, 1986) is a Canadian curler from Meadow Lake, Saskatchewan. She currently plays lead on Team Sarah Daniels.

== Career ==
Demmans spent the majority of her early career playing with Robyn Silvernagle. In 2010, the pair won their first women's tour event at the Cornerstone Credit Union Ladies Cash Bonspiel. That same year, they played in their first Saskatchewan Scotties Tournament of Hearts, finishing fifth in their pool with a 2–3 record. Two years later, they finished 3–2 in their pool, however, missed out on the playoffs due to a head-to-head tiebreaker loss.

In 2013, Demmans began playing for the Jessie Kaufman rink out of Alberta. With third Tiffany Steuber and lead Stephanie Enright, the team won the inaugural Avonair Cash Spiel and finished runner-up at the Boundary Ford Curling Classic and the Shamrock Shotgun. They also played in the 2013 Curlers Corner Autumn Gold Curling Classic, which at the time was a Grand Slam of Curling event. Despite their success throughout the season, the team had mixed results at the 2014 Alberta Scotties Tournament of Hearts, ultimately missing the playoffs with a 4–3 record.

The following season, Demmans returned to Saskatchewan where she played for Jolene Campbell. This arrangement only lasted one season with the team failing to qualify for the provincial championship. Demmans then rejoined Silvernagle at third with new front-enders Cristina Goertzen and Kara Kilden. In their first season together, the team had a strong run at the 2016 Saskatchewan Scotties Tournament of Hearts, finishing first in their pool to earn a spot in the 1 vs. 2 game. They then lost to Stefanie Lawton before dropping the semifinal to Jolene Campbell, ending their run. The following year, the team again had an impressive showing at the provincial championship, taking the top seed through the round robin with a 7–1 record. They then defeated Lawton in the 1 vs. 2 game to advance to the final where they were defeated 10–7 by Penny Barker.

For the 2017–18 season, the team brought on Jolene Campbell as their new third, shifting Demmans to second. On tour, they won the Boundary Ford Curling Classic and reached the playoffs at the 2017 GSOC Tour Challenge Tier 2 and the 2017 Colonial Square Ladies Classic. Heading into the 2018 Saskatchewan Scotties Tournament of Hearts as one of the favorites, the team again topped the round robin with a 7–1 record and then beat Chantelle Eberle in the 1 vs. 2 game. Facing Sherry Anderson in the championship game, Team Silvernagle fell 7–6 in an extra end, losing their second straight provincial championship final. After the season, the team disbanded, with Demmans and Campbell joining the newly formed Kristen Streifel rink for the 2018–19 season.

Playing a limited schedule, Team Streifel reached the playoffs in every event they played in their first season together, notably making the semifinals of the 2018 Tour Challenge Tier 2. In the new year, Demmans herself would miss the 2019 Saskatchewan Scotties Tournament of Hearts due to maternity leave. With spare Callan Hamon, her team finished in third place after a semifinal loss to Sherry Anderson. Back together the following season, the team was unable to maintain their consistency from the year before, ultimately failing to qualify in every tour event and finishing 2–3 in the newly formatted triple knockout of the provincial championship.

After Team Streifel broke up following the season, Demmans joined the newly formed Robyn Silvernagle rink alongside Kristen Streifel, Jessie Hunkin and Becca Hebert. Due to the COVID-19 pandemic in Canada, the qualification process for the 2021 Canadian Olympic Curling Trials had to be modified to qualify enough teams for the championship. In these modifications, Curling Canada created the 2021 Canadian Curling Pre-Trials Direct-Entry Event, an event where eight teams would compete to try to earn one of two spots into the 2021 Canadian Olympic Curling Pre-Trials. Team Silvernagle qualified for the Pre-Trials Direct-Entry Event as the third seed. The team qualified for the playoffs through the B Event, giving them two chances to secure a spot in the Pre-Trials. They then, however, lost 10–8 to Kerry Galusha and 8–6 to Jill Brothers, finishing third and not advancing. On tour, the team qualified for three straight quarterfinals at the Boundary Ford Curling Classic, the SaskTour Women's Moose Jaw event and the Red Deer Curling Classic. In December 2021, they won the Swift Current Women's Spiel, defeating Michelle Englot 8–3 in the championship game. In the new year, Team Silvernagle competed in the 2022 Saskatchewan Scotties Tournament of Hearts where they entered as the third seeds. They qualified for the playoffs through the C Event before being eliminated by Amber Holland in the 3 vs. 4 page playoff game. After this, Robyn Silvernagle left the team and Jessie Hunkin took over skipping duties with the team now playing out of Alberta.

In their third event, Team Hunkin reached the semifinals of the Prestige Hotels & Resorts Curling Classic, losing to Ikue Kitazawa. They then played in the 2022 Tour Challenge Tier 2 where after dropping their opening game, they ran the table to reach the final. There, they were defeated 8–2 by Clancy Grandy. After two more quarterfinal appearances, the team played in the 2023 Alberta Scotties Tournament of Hearts where they finished in fifth place with a 3–4 record. Third Kristen Streifel then left the team and was replaced by Jessie Haughian. To begin the 2023–24 season, the team had three consecutive quarterfinal appearances. Their best finish came at the Saville Grand Prix with a semifinal loss to Selena Sturmay. At the 2024 Alberta Scotties Tournament of Hearts, the team bettered their performance with a 4–3 record but did not qualify for the playoffs based on their draw-to-the-button total.

After two seasons in Alberta, Demmans returned to Saskatchewan to play for Jolene Campbell. With Rachel Erickson and Abby Ackland, the team began at the 2024 PointsBet Invitational which they qualified for through CTRS points. In the opening round, they lost 8–5 to Kate Cameron. On tour, they only reached the playoffs once at the Martensville International where they made the semifinals. They also played in the 2024 Tour Challenge Tier 2, however, finished 1–3. Although they struggled throughout the tour season, Team Campbell turned things around at the 2025 Viterra Prairie Pinnacle, going 7–1 through the round robin and earning a spot in the 1 vs. 2 game where they beat Nancy Martin. Facing Martin again in the final, the team was unable to overcome an early four-point deficit, losing 8–7 and finishing second. Ackland then left the rink and was replaced by Robyn Silvernagle for the 2025–26 season. On tour, the team made one final in Moose Jaw and qualified in four other events. At provincials, they finished second through the round robin with a 6–2 record but then knocked off the previously undefeated Ashley Thevenot 10–7 to qualify for the championship game. There, after losing the final in 2017, 2018 and 2025, Demmans won her first provincial championship as the team beat Jana Tisdale 4–3.

== Personal life ==
Demmans is employed as a dental hygienist and is also a personal trainer. She is engaged and has three children. She previously attended the University of Saskatchewan and the Canadian Institute of Dental Hygiene.

== Teams ==
Season	Skip	Third	Second	Lead
2009–10	Robyn Silvernagle	Sasha Yole	Dayna Demmans	Kendra Syrota
2010–11	Robyn Silvernagle	Sasha Yole	Dayna Demmans	Cristina Goertzen
2011–12	Robyn Silvernagle	Kelsey Waker	Dayna Demmans	Cristina Goertzen
2012–13	Brett Barber	Robyn Silvernagle	Kailena Bay	Dayna Demers
2013–14	Jessie Kaufman	Tiffany Steuber	Dayna Demers	Stephanie Enright
2014–15	Jolene Campbell	Teejay Haichert	Dayna Demers	Kelsey Waker
2015–16	Robyn Silvernagle	Dayna Demers	Cristina Goertzen	Kara Kilden
2016–17	Robyn Silvernagle	Dayna Demers	Cristina Goertzen	Kara Thevenot
2017–18	Robyn Silvernagle	Jolene Campbell	Dayna Demers	Kara Thevenot
2018–19	Kristen Streifel	Jolene Campbell	Dayna Demers	Breanne Knapp
2019–20	Kristen Streifel	Kelly Schafer	Kalynn Park	Dayna Demers
2020–21	Robyn Silvernagle	Kristen Streifel	Jessie Hunkin	Dayna Demers
2021–22	Robyn Silvernagle	Kristen Streifel	Jessie Hunkin	Dayna Demers
2022–23	Jessie Hunkin	Kristen Streifel	Becca Hebert	Dayna Demers
2023–24	Jessie Hunkin	Jessie Haughian	Becca Hebert	Dayna Demmans
2024–25	Jolene Campbell	Abby Ackland	Rachel Erickson	Dayna Demmans
2025–26	Jolene Campbell	Robyn Silvernagle	Rachel Big Eagle	Dayna Demmans
2026–27	Sarah Daniels	Abby Ackland	Calissa Daly	Dayna Demmans
