= 2019 Players' Championship =

Grand Slam of Curling event

- Host city: Toronto, Ontario
- Arena: Mattamy Athletic Centre
- Dates: April 9–14
- Men's winner: (Alberta) Team Bottcher
- Skip: Brendan Bottcher
- Third: Darren Moulding
- Second: Brad Thiessen
- Lead: Karrick Martin
- Finalist: (Alberta) Kevin Koe
- Women's winner: (Manitoba) Team Einarson
- Skip: Kerri Einarson
- Third: Val Sweeting
- Second: Shannon Birchard
- Lead: Briane Meilleur
- Finalist: (Sweden) Anna Hasselborg

The 2019 Players' Championship was held from April 9 to 14 at the Mattamy Athletic Centre in Toronto, Ontario. It was the seventh Grand Slam event of the 2018–19 curling season.

In the men's final, Brendan Bottcher defeated Kevin Koe 6–1. Team Bottcher was playing in their third straight Grand Slam final. In the women's final, Kerri Einarson defeated Anna Hasselborg 5–4 in an extra end. It was the second final that Team Einarson played in that season.

== Qualification ==
The top 12 ranked men's and women's teams on the World Curling Tour's Year-to-Date ranking as of March 11 qualified for the event.

=== Men ===
Top Year-to-Date men's teams as of March 11:

1. (Alberta) Kevin Koe
2. (Ontario) Brad Jacobs
3. (Alberta) Brendan Bottcher
4. (Scotland) Bruce Mouat
5. (Sweden) Niklas Edin
6. (Ontario) John Epping
7. (Newfoundland and Labrador) Brad Gushue
8. (Scotland) Ross Paterson
9. (Ontario) Glenn Howard
10. (Saskatchewan) Matt Dunstone
11. (Switzerland) Peter de Cruz
12. (Manitoba) Reid Carruthers

=== Women ===
Top Year-to-Date women's teams as of March 11:

1. (Ontario) Rachel Homan
2. (Sweden) Anna Hasselborg
3. (Manitoba) Kerri Einarson
4. (Switzerland) Silvana Tirinzoni
5. (Manitoba) Jennifer Jones
6. (Alberta) Chelsea Carey
7. (Japan) Satsuki Fujisawa
8. (Manitoba) Tracy Fleury
9. (Saskatchewan) Robyn Silvernagle
10. (Alberta) Casey Scheidegger
11. (Russia) ~~Alina Kovaleva~~
12. (Japan) Sayaka Yoshimura
13. (Switzerland) Elena Stern

== Men ==
=== Teams ===
The teams are listed as follows:

Skip	Third	Second	Lead	Locale
Brendan Bottcher	Darren Moulding	Brad Thiessen	Karrick Martin	Edmonton, Alberta
Mike McEwen	Reid Carruthers	Derek Samagalski	Colin Hodgson	Winnipeg, Manitoba
Benoît Schwarz (fourth)	Sven Michel	Peter de Cruz (skip)	Valentin Tanner	Geneva, Switzerland
Matt Dunstone	Braeden Moskowy	Catlin Schneider	Dustin Kidby	Regina, Saskatchewan
Niklas Edin	Oskar Eriksson	Rasmus Wranå	Christoffer Sundgren	Karlstad, Sweden
John Epping	Matt Camm	Brent Laing	Craig Savill	Toronto, Ontario
Brad Gushue	Mark Nichols	Brett Gallant	Geoff Walker	St. John's, Newfoundland and Labrador
Glenn Howard	Scott Howard	David Mathers	Tim March	Penetanguishene, Ontario
Brad Jacobs	Ryan Fry	E.J. Harnden	Ryan Harnden	Sault Ste. Marie, Ontario
Kevin Koe	B.J. Neufeld	Colton Flasch	Ben Hebert	Calgary, Alberta
Bruce Mouat	Grant Hardie	Bobby Lammie	Hammy McMillan Jr.	Edinburgh, Scotland
Ross Paterson	Kyle Waddell	Duncan Menzies	Michael Goodfellow	Glasgow, Scotland

=== Round-robin standings ===
Final round-robin standings

Key
Teams to playoffs
Teams to tiebreakers

Pool A	W	L	PF	PA	SO
(Ontario) Glenn Howard	3	2	22	21	3
(Sweden) Niklas Edin	3	2	27	21	5
(Alberta) Kevin Koe	3	2	29	22	11
(Scotland) Ross Paterson	2	3	21	26	4
(Scotland) Bruce Mouat	2	3	24	34	9
(Manitoba) Team Carruthers	2	3	25	24	10

Pool B	W	L	PF	PA	SO
(Ontario) Brad Jacobs	4	1	33	19	1
(Newfoundland and Labrador) Brad Gushue	4	1	31	18	6
(Alberta) Brendan Bottcher	3	2	27	27	7
(Switzerland) Peter de Cruz	2	3	30	26	2
(Ontario) John Epping	2	3	13	25	8
(Saskatchewan) Matt Dunstone	0	5	13	32	

=== Round-robin results ===
All draw times are listed in Eastern Daylight Time (UTC-4).

==== Draw 1 ====
Tuesday, April 9, 7:00 pm

Sheet D	1	2	3	4	5	6	7	8	Final
(Ontario) Brad Jacobs 🔨	1	0	2	2	1	0	X	X	6
(Saskatchewan) Matt Dunstone	0	1	0	0	0	1	X	X	2

Sheet E	1	2	3	4	5	6	7	8	Final
(Newfoundland and Labrador) Brad Gushue 🔨	0	2	1	0	0	0	1	X	4
(Ontario) John Epping	0	0	0	0	1	0	0	X	1

==== Draw 2 ====
Wednesday, April 10, 8:30 am

Sheet A	1	2	3	4	5	6	7	8	Final
(Sweden) Niklas Edin	3	3	0	5	X	X	X	X	11
(Scotland) Bruce Mouat 🔨	0	0	2	0	X	X	X	X	2

Sheet C	1	2	3	4	5	6	7	8	Final
(Alberta) Brendan Bottcher	2	0	2	0	2	0	0	0	6
(Switzerland) Peter de Cruz 🔨	0	1	0	2	0	2	0	0	5

Sheet D	1	2	3	4	5	6	7	8	Final
(Scotland) Ross Paterson	0	0	2	0	0	1	0	X	3
(Manitoba) Team Carruthers 🔨	0	2	0	0	2	0	2	X	6

==== Draw 3 ====
Wednesday, April 10, 12:00 pm

Sheet B	1	2	3	4	5	6	7	8	Final
(Ontario) John Epping 🔨	1	0	0	2	0	1	0	1	5
(Saskatchewan) Matt Dunstone	0	1	0	0	1	0	1	0	3

Sheet C	1	2	3	4	5	6	7	8	Final
(Alberta) Kevin Koe	0	2	0	0	1	0	2	0	5
(Ontario) Glenn Howard 🔨	1	0	0	2	0	2	0	1	6

==== Draw 4 ====
Wednesday, April 10, 4:00 pm

Sheet B	1	2	3	4	5	6	7	8	Final
(Newfoundland and Labrador) Brad Gushue	1	0	2	0	0	2	0	2	7
(Switzerland) Peter de Cruz 🔨	0	1	0	1	0	0	3	0	5

Sheet C	1	2	3	4	5	6	7	8	Final
(Sweden) Niklas Edin	1	1	0	1	0	0	2	1	6
(Scotland) Ross Paterson 🔨	0	0	1	0	1	2	0	0	4

Sheet E	1	2	3	4	5	6	7	8	Final
(Ontario) Brad Jacobs 🔨	0	1	0	0	3	0	3	X	7
(Alberta) Brendan Bottcher	1	0	1	0	0	2	0	X	4

==== Draw 5 ====
Wednesday, April 10, 8:00 pm

Sheet B	1	2	3	4	5	6	7	8	9	Final
(Scotland) Bruce Mouat	0	0	3	0	0	1	0	2	0	6
(Ontario) Glenn Howard 🔨	3	0	0	1	0	0	2	0	1	7

Sheet E	1	2	3	4	5	6	7	8	Final
(Alberta) Kevin Koe 🔨	2	0	0	1	1	2	0	1	7
(Manitoba) Team Carruthers	0	0	3	0	0	0	3	0	6

==== Draw 6 ====
Thursday, April 11, 8:30 am

Sheet A	1	2	3	4	5	6	7	8	Final
(Ontario) Brad Jacobs 🔨	0	0	3	3	X	X	X	X	6
(Ontario) John Epping	0	0	0	0	X	X	X	X	0

Sheet D	1	2	3	4	5	6	7	8	Final
(Alberta) Brendan Bottcher	0	0	2	0	1	0	X	X	3
(Newfoundland and Labrador) Brad Gushue 🔨	1	1	0	3	0	3	X	X	8

Sheet E	1	2	3	4	5	6	7	8	Final
(Saskatchewan) Matt Dunstone	0	1	0	0	X	X	X	X	1
(Switzerland) Peter de Cruz 🔨	1	0	4	3	X	X	X	X	8

==== Draw 7 ====
Thursday, April 11, 12:00 pm

Sheet A	1	2	3	4	5	6	7	8	Final
(Ontario) Glenn Howard	0	0	0	2	0	0	0	X	2
(Manitoba) Team Carruthers 🔨	0	1	0	0	0	1	2	X	4

Sheet E	1	2	3	4	5	6	7	8	Final
(Scotland) Bruce Mouat	0	2	0	1	0	0	2	0	5
(Scotland) Ross Paterson 🔨	2	0	3	0	0	1	0	1	7

==== Draw 8 ====
Thursday, April 11, 4:00 pm

Sheet A	1	2	3	4	5	6	7	8	Final
(Alberta) Brendan Bottcher 🔨	3	0	0	2	0	1	0	1	7
(Saskatchewan) Matt Dunstone	0	1	1	0	1	0	3	0	6

Sheet C	1	2	3	4	5	6	7	8	Final
(Ontario) Brad Jacobs	1	0	1	0	4	0	0	1	7
(Newfoundland and Labrador) Brad Gushue 🔨	0	1	0	2	0	0	3	0	6

==== Draw 9 ====
Thursday, April 11, 8:00 pm

Sheet B	1	2	3	4	5	6	7	8	Final
(Ontario) John Epping 🔨	2	0	0	1	1	0	0	2	6
(Switzerland) Peter de Cruz	0	1	1	0	0	2	1	0	5

Sheet D	1	2	3	4	5	6	7	8	Final
(Alberta) Kevin Koe 🔨	2	0	2	0	2	X	X	X	6
(Sweden) Niklas Edin	0	1	0	1	0	X	X	X	2

==== Draw 10 ====
Friday, April 12, 8:30 am

Sheet D	1	2	3	4	5	6	7	8	9	Final
(Scotland) Bruce Mouat	1	1	0	1	0	2	0	0	1	6
(Manitoba) Team Carruthers 🔨	0	0	3	0	1	0	0	1	0	5

==== Draw 11 ====
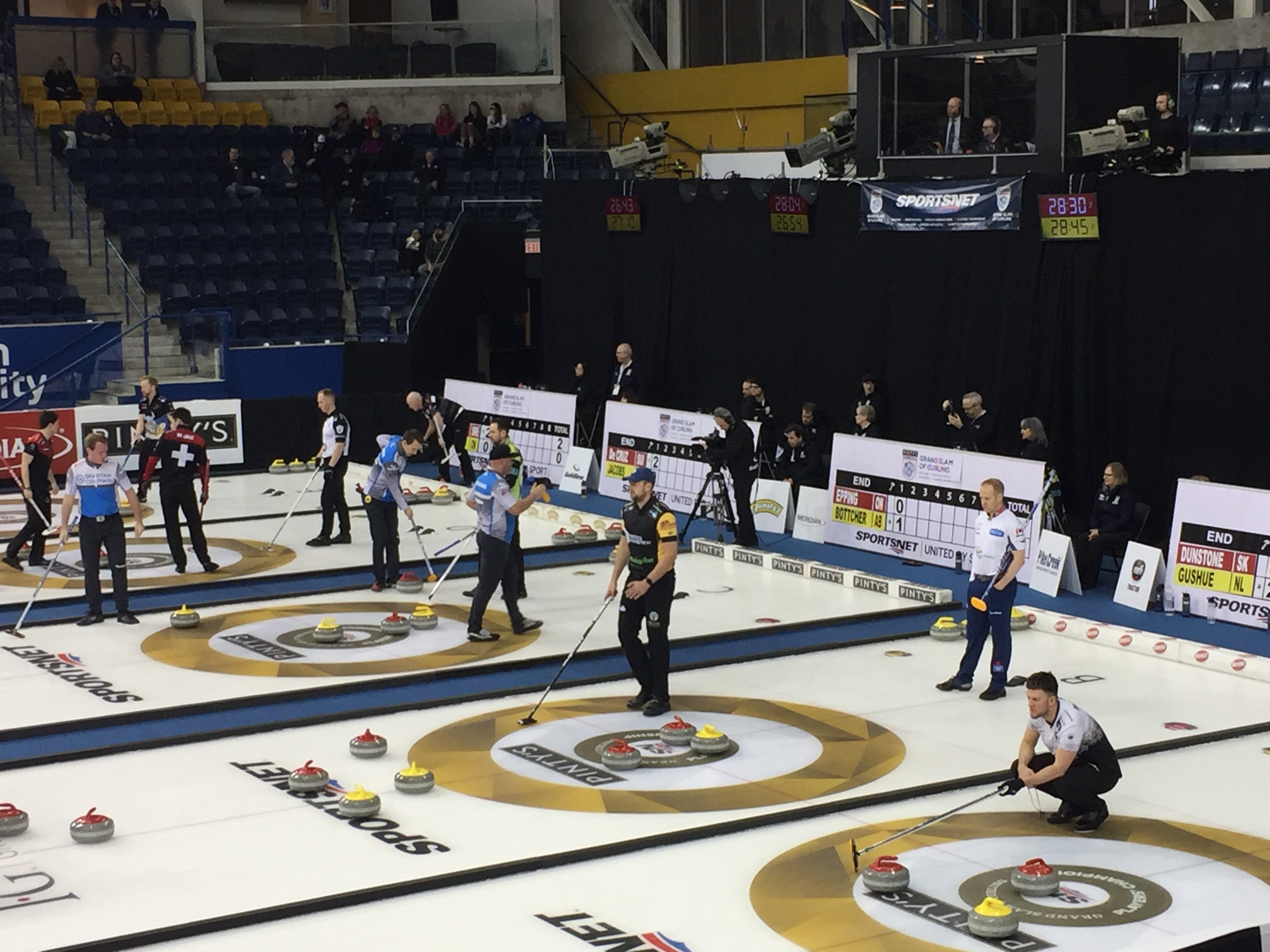
Draw 11 action

Friday, April 12, 12:00 pm

Sheet A	1	2	3	4	5	6	7	8	Final
(Alberta) Kevin Koe 🔨	4	0	2	1	0	X	X	X	7
(Scotland) Ross Paterson	0	2	0	0	1	X	X	X	3

Sheet B	1	2	3	4	5	6	7	8	Final
(Newfoundland and Labrador) Brad Gushue 🔨	2	0	2	1	1	X	X	X	6
(Saskatchewan) Matt Dunstone	0	1	0	0	0	X	X	X	1

Sheet C	1	2	3	4	5	6	7	8	Final
(Alberta) Brendan Bottcher 🔨	1	0	0	2	2	2	X	X	7
(Ontario) John Epping	0	1	0	0	0	0	X	X	1

Sheet D	1	2	3	4	5	6	7	8	Final
(Ontario) Brad Jacobs	0	2	0	0	3	0	0	1	6
(Switzerland) Peter de Cruz 🔨	2	0	1	2	0	1	1	0	7

Sheet E	1	2	3	4	5	6	7	8	Final
(Sweden) Niklas Edin 🔨	2	0	0	0	0	0	0	X	2
(Ontario) Glenn Howard	0	1	0	0	1	2	1	X	5

==== Draw 13 ====
Friday, April 12, 8:00 pm

Sheet B	1	2	3	4	5	6	7	8	Final
(Sweden) Niklas Edin 🔨	2	0	3	0	0	1	0	X	6
(Manitoba) Team Carruthers	0	2	0	2	0	0	0	X	4

Sheet C	1	2	3	4	5	6	7	8	Final
(Alberta) Kevin Koe 🔨	0	0	3	0	0	1	0	0	4
(Scotland) Bruce Mouat	1	0	0	1	1	0	0	2	5

Sheet D	1	2	3	4	5	6	7	8	Final
(Ontario) Glenn Howard 🔨	0	0	0	2	0	0	0	X	2
(Scotland) Ross Paterson	0	2	1	0	0	1	0	X	4

=== Tiebreakers ===
Saturday, April 13, 8:30 am

Sheet C	1	2	3	4	5	6	7	8	Final
(Scotland) Ross Paterson 🔨	1	1	0	0	2	0	1	X	5
(Ontario) John Epping	0	0	1	0	0	1	0	X	2

Player percentages
(Scotland) Team Paterson		(Ontario) Team Epping	
Michael Goodfellow	91%	Craig Savill	85%
Duncan Menzies	96%	Brent Laing	78%
Kyle Waddell	95%	Matt Camm	84%
Ross Paterson	93%	John Epping	90%
Total	94%	Total	84%

Sheet D	1	2	3	4	5	6	7	8	Final
(Scotland) Bruce Mouat	0	1	0	1	0	0	0	X	2
(Manitoba) Team Carruthers 🔨	2	0	1	0	1	2	1	X	7

Player percentages
(Scotland) Team Mouat		(Manitoba) Team Carruthers	
Hammy McMillan Jr.	95%	Colin Hodgson	87%
Bobby Lammie	77%	Derek Samagalski	85%
Grant Hardie	95%	Reid Carruthers	84%
Bruce Mouat	69%	Mike McEwen	94%
Total	84%	Total	87%

Saturday, April 13, 12:00 pm

Sheet E	1	2	3	4	5	6	7	8	Final
(Switzerland) Peter de Cruz 🔨	0	2	2	1	0	1	0	1	7
(Manitoba) Team Carruthers	2	0	0	0	0	0	2	0	4

Player percentages
(Switzerland) Team de Cruz		(Manitoba) Team Carruthers	
Valentin Tanner	86%	Colin Hodgson	92%
Peter de Cruz	91%	Derek Samagalski	83%
Sven Michel	74%	Reid Carruthers	77%
Benoît Schwarz	86%	Mike McEwen	87%
Total	84%	Total	85%

=== Playoffs ===
Quarterfinals
1	(Ontario) Brad Jacobs	5
8	(Scotland) Ross Paterson	6
4	(Sweden) Niklas Edin	5
5	(Alberta) Brendan Bottcher	7
2	(Newfoundland and Labrador) Brad Gushue	6
7	(Switzerland) Peter de Cruz	7
3	(Ontario) Glenn Howard	3
6	(Alberta) Kevin Koe	7

Semifinals
8	(Scotland) Ross Paterson	4
5	(Alberta) Brendan Bottcher	7
7	(Switzerland) Peter de Cruz	8
6	(Alberta) Kevin Koe	9

Final
5	(Alberta) Brendan Bottcher	6
6	(Alberta) Kevin Koe	1

==== Quarterfinals ====
Saturday, April 13, 4:00 pm

Sheet A	1	2	3	4	5	6	7	8	Final
(Sweden) Niklas Edin 🔨	1	0	0	3	0	1	0	0	5
(Alberta) Brendan Bottcher	0	2	1	0	1	0	2	1	7

Player percentages
(Sweden) Team Edin		(Alberta) Team Bottcher	
Christoffer Sundgren	84%	Karrick Martin	90%
Rasmus Wranå	77%	Brad Thiessen	83%
Oskar Eriksson	77%	Darren Moulding	78%
Niklas Edin	70%	Brendan Bottcher	93%
Total	77%	Total	86%

Sheet B	1	2	3	4	5	6	7	8	9	Final
(Newfoundland and Labrador) Brad Gushue 🔨	0	1	0	2	0	1	0	2	0	6
(Switzerland) Peter de Cruz	0	0	3	0	1	0	2	0	1	7

Player percentages
(Newfoundland and Labrador) Team Gushue		(Switzerland) Team de Cruz	
Geoff Walker	97%	Valentin Tanner	90%
Brett Gallant	83%	Peter de Cruz	89%
Mark Nichols	79%	Sven Michel	84%
Brad Gushue	86%	Benoît Schwarz	86%
Total	87%	Total	87%

Sheet C	1	2	3	4	5	6	7	8	Final
(Ontario) Glenn Howard	0	1	0	0	2	0	X	X	3
(Alberta) Kevin Koe 🔨	2	0	2	0	0	3	X	X	7

Player percentages
(Ontario) Team Howard		(Alberta) Team Koe	
Tim March	84%	Ben Hebert	94%
David Mathers	81%	Colton Flasch	84%
Scott Howard	78%	B. J. Neufeld	79%
Glenn Howard	71%	Kevin Koe	85%
Total	79%	Total	85%

Sheet D	1	2	3	4	5	6	7	8	9	Final
(Ontario) Brad Jacobs 🔨	1	1	0	1	0	0	0	2	0	5
(Scotland) Ross Paterson	0	0	1	0	2	1	1	0	1	6

Player percentages
(Ontario) Team Jacobs		(Scotland) Team Paterson	
Ryan Harnden	86%	Michael Goodfellow	100%
E. J. Harnden	74%	Duncan Menzies	81%
Ryan Fry	82%	Kyle Waddell	94%
Brad Jacobs	84%	Ross Paterson	88%
Total	82%	Total	91%

==== Semifinals ====
Saturday, April 13, 8:00 pm

Sheet C	1	2	3	4	5	6	7	8	Final
(Scotland) Ross Paterson	0	0	0	1	0	3	0	X	4
(Alberta) Brendan Bottcher 🔨	0	0	2	0	2	0	3	X	7

Player percentages
(Scotland) Team Paterson		(Alberta) Team Bottcher	
Michael Goodfellow	95%	Karrick Martin	95%
Duncan Menzies	78%	Brad Thiessen	79%
Kyle Waddell	91%	Darren Moulding	95%
Ross Paterson	64%	Brendan Bottcher	92%
Total	82%	Total	90%

Sheet D	1	2	3	4	5	6	7	8	9	Final
(Switzerland) Peter de Cruz	1	0	2	0	0	3	0	2	0	8
(Alberta) Kevin Koe 🔨	0	3	0	0	2	0	3	0	1	9

Player percentages
(Switzerland) Team de Cruz		(Alberta) Team Koe	
Valentin Tanner	94%	Ben Hebert	92%
Peter de Cruz	92%	Colton Flasch	92%
Sven Michel	77%	B. J. Neufeld	82%
Benoît Schwarz	82%	Kevin Koe	83%
Total	86%	Total	87%

==== Final ====
Sunday, April 14, 12:00 pm

Sheet C	1	2	3	4	5	6	7	8	Final
(Alberta) Brendan Bottcher	1	0	0	0	1	0	0	4	6
(Alberta) Kevin Koe 🔨	0	0	1	0	0	0	0	0	1

Player percentages
(Alberta) Team Bottcher		(Alberta) Team Koe	
Karrick Martin	87%	Ben Hebert	91%
Brad Thiessen	73%	Colton Flasch	83%
Darren Moulding	87%	B. J. Neufeld	82%
Brendan Bottcher	100%	Kevin Koe	81%
Total	86%	Total	84%

== Women ==
=== Teams ===
The teams are listed as follows:

Skip	Third	Second	Lead	Alternate	Locale
Chelsea Carey	Sarah Wilkes	Dana Ferguson	Rachel Brown		Calgary, Alberta
Kerri Einarson	Val Sweeting	Shannon Birchard	Briane Meilleur		Gimli, Manitoba
Tracy Fleury	Selena Njegovan	Taylor McDonald (Note: Taylor McDonald replaced Team Fleury's second, Liz Fyfe, who was due to give birth.)	Kristin MacCuish		East St. Paul, Manitoba
Satsuki Fujisawa	Chinami Yoshida	Yumi Suzuki	Yurika Yoshida		Kitami, Japan
Anna Hasselborg	Sara McManus	Agnes Knochenhauer	Sofia Mabergs		Sundbyberg, Sweden
Rachel Homan	Emma Miskew	Joanne Courtney	Lisa Weagle	Laura Walker (Note: Laura Walker was added on Friday to replace Team Homan's second, Joanne Courtney, who was feeling fatigued due to her pregnancy.)	Ottawa, Ontario
Jennifer Jones	Kaitlyn Lawes	Jocelyn Peterman	Dawn McEwen		Winnipeg, Manitoba
Casey Scheidegger	Cary-Anne McTaggart	Jessie Haughian	Kristie Moore		Lethbridge, Alberta
Robyn Silvernagle	Stefanie Lawton	Jessie Hunkin	Kara Thevenot		North Battleford, Saskatchewan
Briar Hürlimann (fourth)	Elena Stern (skip)	Lisa Gisler	Céline Koller		Brig, Switzerland
Alina Pätz (fourth)	Silvana Tirinzoni (skip)	Esther Neuenschwander	Melanie Barbezat		Aarau, Switzerland
Sayaka Yoshimura	Kaho Onodera	Anna Ohmiya	Yumie Funayama		Sapporo, Japan

=== Round-robin standings ===
Final round-robin standings

Key
Teams to playoffs
Teams to tiebreakers

Pool A	W	L	PF	PA	SO
(Manitoba) Tracy Fleury	4	1	29	24	7
(Saskatchewan) Robyn Silvernagle	4	1	26	24	8
(Manitoba) Jennifer Jones	3	2	25	21	3
(Ontario) Rachel Homan	2	3	23	27	5
(Switzerland) Silvana Tirinzoni	1	4	25	22	9
(Switzerland) Elena Stern	1	4	19	29	11

Pool B	W	L	PF	PA	SO
(Sweden) Anna Hasselborg	5	0	36	16	4
(Alberta) Casey Scheidegger	3	2	27	23	6
(Alberta) Chelsea Carey	2	3	19	33	1
(Manitoba) Kerri Einarson	2	3	23	22	2
(Japan) Satsuki Fujisawa	2	3	26	30	10
(Japan) Sayaka Yoshimura	1	4	21	28	

=== Round-robin results ===
All draw times are listed in Eastern Daylight Time (UTC-4).

==== Draw 1 ====
Tuesday, April 9, 7:00 pm

Sheet A	1	2	3	4	5	6	7	8	9	Final
(Ontario) Rachel Homan 🔨	0	2	0	1	0	0	1	0	0	4
(Saskatchewan) Robyn Silvernagle	0	0	1	0	0	1	0	2	1	5

Sheet B	1	2	3	4	5	6	7	8	Final
(Manitoba) Kerri Einarson	0	0	0	2	0	2	0	2	6
(Japan) Satsuki Fujisawa 🔨	0	1	1	0	1	0	1	0	4

==== Draw 2 ====
Wednesday, April 10, 8:30 am

Sheet B	1	2	3	4	5	6	7	8	Final
(Sweden) Anna Hasselborg 🔨	2	0	2	0	2	0	2	X	8
(Japan) Sayaka Yoshimura	0	1	0	1	0	2	0	X	4

Sheet E	1	2	3	4	5	6	7	8	Final
(Manitoba) Jennifer Jones 🔨	0	4	2	1	0	X	X	X	7
(Switzerland) Elena Stern	1	0	0	0	1	X	X	X	2

==== Draw 3 ====
Wednesday, April 10, 12:00 pm

Sheet A	1	2	3	4	5	6	7	8	9	Final
(Switzerland) Silvana Tirinzoni	0	0	2	0	0	1	0	1	0	4
(Manitoba) Tracy Fleury 🔨	0	2	0	0	0	0	2	0	1	5

Sheet E	1	2	3	4	5	6	7	8	Final
(Alberta) Chelsea Carey 🔨	2	0	0	1	0	X	X	X	3
(Alberta) Casey Scheidegger	0	3	2	0	3	X	X	X	8

==== Draw 4 ====
Wednesday, April 10, 4:00 pm

Sheet A	1	2	3	4	5	6	7	8	Final
(Sweden) Anna Hasselborg 🔨	1	0	2	1	0	0	1	X	5
(Manitoba) Kerri Einarson	0	1	0	0	1	0	0	X	2

Sheet D	1	2	3	4	5	6	7	8	Final
(Ontario) Rachel Homan 🔨	2	0	1	0	1	0	3	X	7
(Switzerland) Elena Stern	0	1	0	1	0	1	0	X	3

==== Draw 5 ====
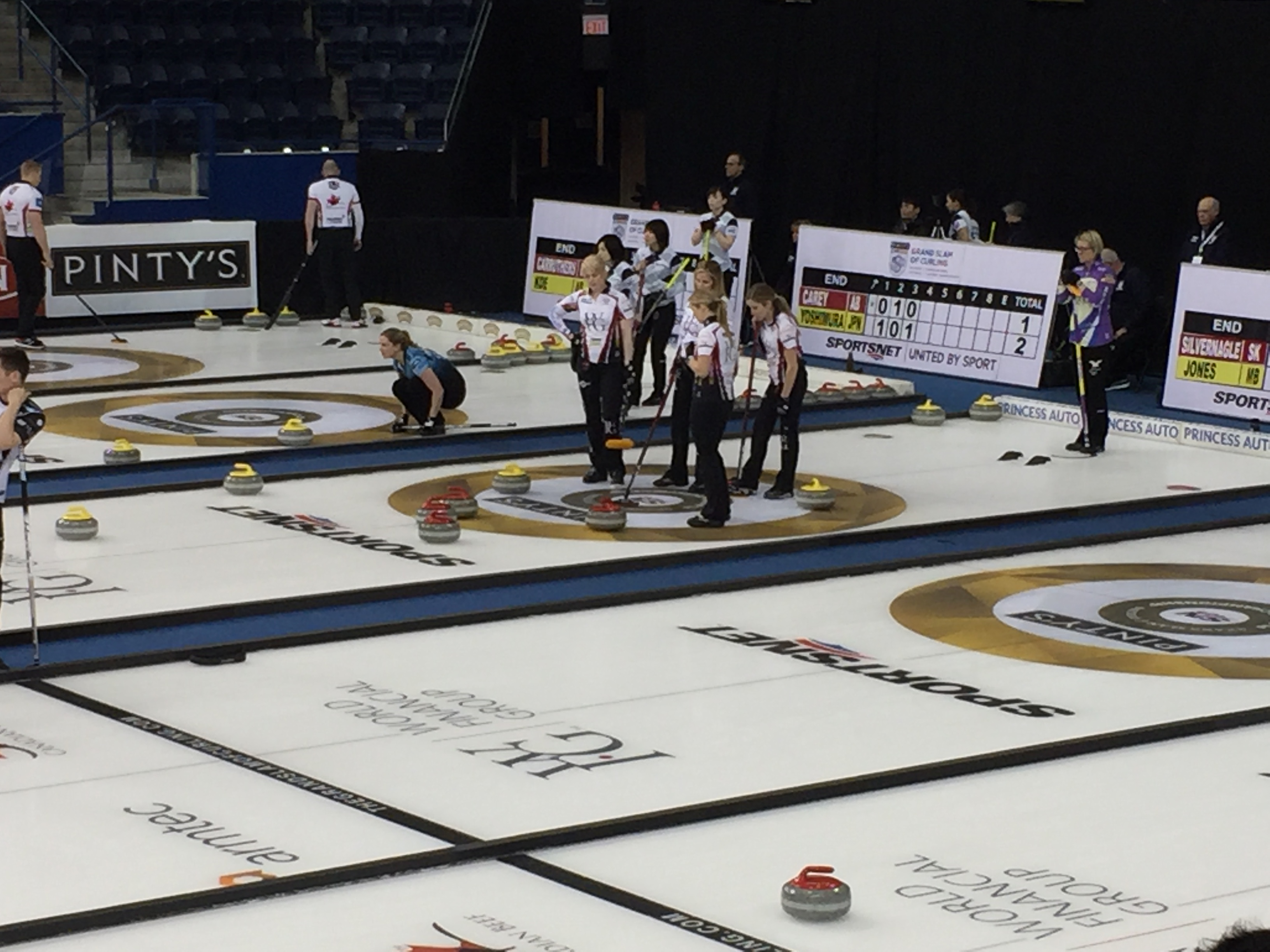
Draw 5 action; Team Jennifer Jones discussing a shot

Wednesday, April 10, 8:00 pm

Sheet A	1	2	3	4	5	6	7	8	Final
(Japan) Satsuki Fujisawa	0	2	0	0	1	1	0	X	4
(Alberta) Casey Scheidegger 🔨	1	0	0	3	0	0	5	X	9

Sheet C	1	2	3	4	5	6	7	8	Final
(Manitoba) Jennifer Jones	0	0	0	3	0	1	0	0	4
(Saskatchewan) Robyn Silvernagle 🔨	2	1	1	0	1	0	1	1	7

Sheet D	1	2	3	4	5	6	7	8	Final
(Alberta) Chelsea Carey 🔨	0	1	0	0	1	1	0	1	4
(Japan) Sayaka Yoshimura	1	0	1	0	0	0	1	0	3

==== Draw 6 ====
Thursday, April 11, 8:30 am

Sheet B	1	2	3	4	5	6	7	8	Final
(Ontario) Rachel Homan	0	2	0	2	0	4	0	X	8
(Manitoba) Tracy Fleury 🔨	1	0	2	0	1	0	1	X	5

Sheet C	1	2	3	4	5	6	7	8	Final
(Switzerland) Silvana Tirinzoni 🔨	1	0	1	0	0	0	1	X	3
(Switzerland) Elena Stern	0	2	0	0	2	1	0	X	5

==== Draw 7 ====
Thursday, April 11, 12:00 pm

Sheet B	1	2	3	4	5	6	7	8	Final
(Japan) Sayaka Yoshimura	0	0	1	0	1	0	1	0	3
(Alberta) Casey Scheidegger 🔨	0	2	0	1	0	1	0	1	5

Sheet C	1	2	3	4	5	6	7	8	Final
(Alberta) Chelsea Carey 🔨	0	2	0	0	0	2	0	2	6
(Manitoba) Kerri Einarson	0	0	1	1	0	0	2	0	4

Sheet D	1	2	3	4	5	6	7	8	Final
(Sweden) Anna Hasselborg 🔨	0	1	0	4	1	0	0	1	7
(Japan) Satsuki Fujisawa	0	0	1	0	0	2	0	0	3

==== Draw 8 ====
Thursday, April 11, 4:00 pm

Sheet B	1	2	3	4	5	6	7	8	9	Final
(Saskatchewan) Robyn Silvernagle	0	0	2	0	0	1	0	1	1	5
(Switzerland) Elena Stern 🔨	0	2	0	1	0	0	1	0	0	4

Sheet D	1	2	3	4	5	6	7	8	Final
(Manitoba) Jennifer Jones 🔨	0	0	0	1	0	2	1	0	4
(Manitoba) Tracy Fleury	1	1	1	0	1	0	0	1	5

Sheet E	1	2	3	4	5	6	7	8	Final
(Ontario) Rachel Homan	0	1	0	0	0	X	X	X	1
(Switzerland) Silvana Tirinzoni 🔨	1	0	4	2	2	X	X	X	9

==== Draw 9 ====
Thursday, April 11, 8:00 pm

Sheet A	1	2	3	4	5	6	7	8	9	Final
(Manitoba) Kerri Einarson 🔨	2	0	0	0	1	0	0	1	0	4
(Japan) Sayaka Yoshimura	0	1	0	1	0	1	1	0	1	5

Sheet C	1	2	3	4	5	6	7	8	Final
(Sweden) Anna Hasselborg	0	1	2	1	0	1	0	1	6
(Alberta) Casey Scheidegger 🔨	1	0	0	0	1	0	1	0	3

Sheet E	1	2	3	4	5	6	7	8	Final
(Alberta) Chelsea Carey 🔨	0	1	0	0	0	1	0	X	2
(Japan) Satsuki Fujisawa	1	0	3	1	0	0	3	X	8

==== Draw 10 ====
Friday, April 12, 8:30 am

Sheet B	1	2	3	4	5	6	7	8	9	Final
(Manitoba) Jennifer Jones 🔨	0	1	0	1	0	1	1	0	1	5
(Switzerland) Silvana Tirinzoni	0	0	1	0	2	0	0	1	0	4

Sheet C	1	2	3	4	5	6	7	8	Final
(Japan) Satsuki Fujisawa	0	2	1	2	0	1	0	1	7
(Japan) Sayaka Yoshimura 🔨	2	0	0	0	2	0	2	0	6

Sheet E	1	2	3	4	5	6	7	8	Final
(Manitoba) Tracy Fleury 🔨	1	0	2	0	0	2	0	2	7
(Saskatchewan) Robyn Silvernagle	0	1	0	0	2	0	0	0	3

==== Draw 12 ====
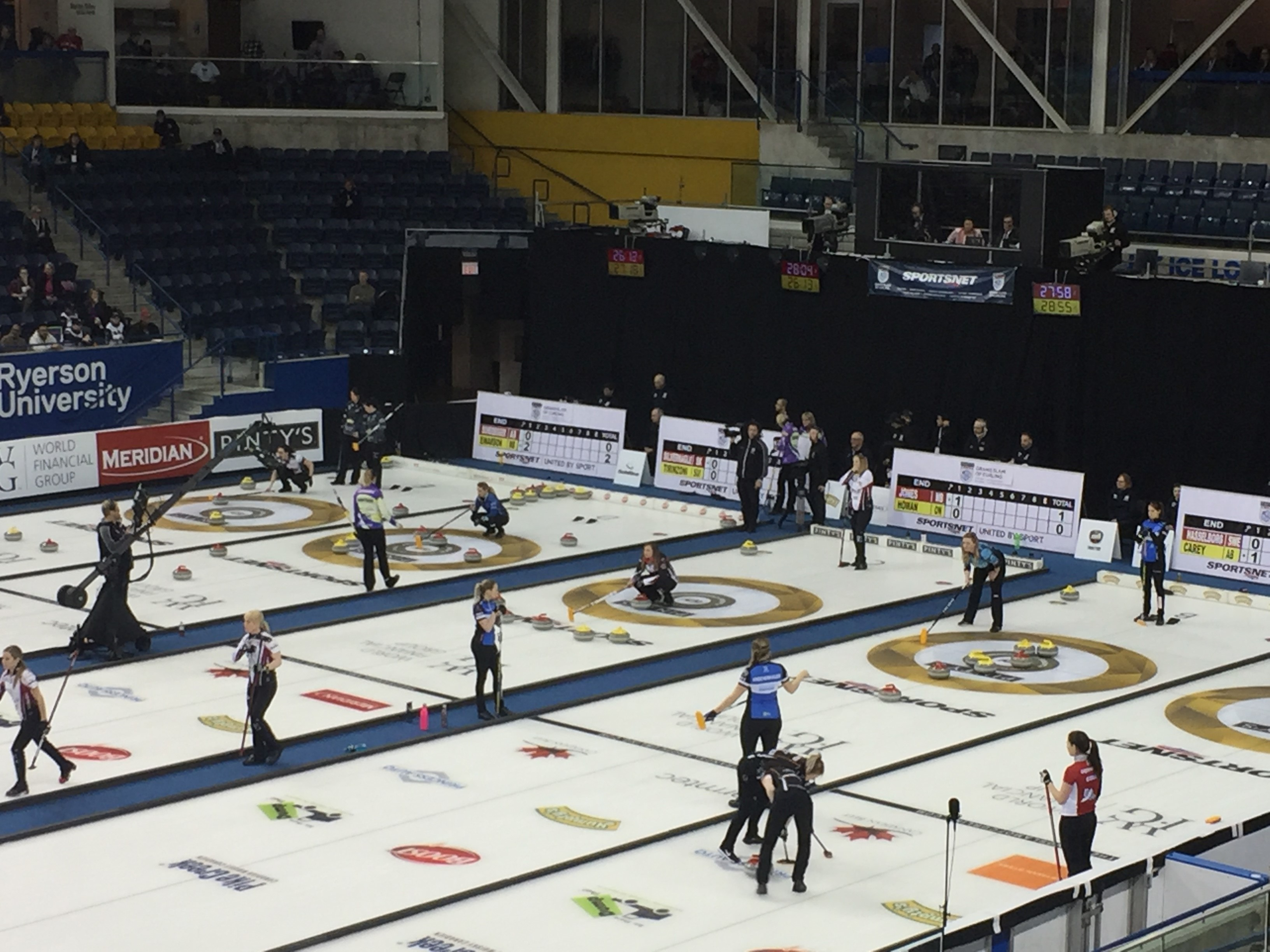
Draw 12 action

Friday, April 12, 4:00 pm

Sheet A	1	2	3	4	5	6	7	8	Final
(Manitoba) Tracy Fleury	2	0	1	2	1	0	0	1	7
(Switzerland) Elena Stern 🔨	0	3	0	0	0	1	1	0	5

Sheet B	1	2	3	4	5	6	7	8	Final
(Sweden) Anna Hasselborg	0	3	0	3	0	4	X	X	10
(Alberta) Chelsea Carey 🔨	1	0	2	0	1	0	X	X	4

Sheet C	1	2	3	4	5	6	7	8	Final
(Ontario) Rachel Homan	0	1	0	1	0	0	1	0	3
(Manitoba) Jennifer Jones 🔨	1	0	1	0	1	1	0	1	5

Sheet D	1	2	3	4	5	6	7	8	9	Final
(Switzerland) Silvana Tirinzoni	0	0	1	1	0	2	0	1	0	5
(Saskatchewan) Robyn Silvernagle 🔨	0	1	0	0	2	0	1	0	1	6

Sheet E	1	2	3	4	5	6	7	8	Final
(Manitoba) Kerri Einarson 🔨	2	1	0	2	0	2	X	X	7
(Alberta) Casey Scheidegger	0	0	1	0	1	0	X	X	2

=== Tiebreaker ===
Friday, April 12, 8:00 pm

Sheet A	1	2	3	4	5	6	7	8	Final
(Ontario) Rachel Homan 🔨	0	1	0	2	0	1	1	0	5
(Japan) Satsuki Fujisawa	0	0	2	0	2	0	0	2	6

Player percentages
(Ontario) Team Homan		(Japan) Team Fujisawa	
Lisa Weagle	77%	Yurika Yoshida	88%
Laura Walker	74%	Yumi Suzuki	81%
Emma Miskew	80%	Chinami Yoshida	86%
Rachel Homan	78%	Satsuki Fujisawa	86%
Total	77%	Total	85%

=== Playoffs ===
Quarterfinals
1	(Sweden) Anna Hasselborg	5
8	(Japan) Satsuki Fujisawa	4
4	(Manitoba) Jennifer Jones	5
5	(Alberta) Casey Scheidegger	6
2	(Manitoba) Tracy Fleury	4
7	(Manitoba) Kerri Einarson	6
3	(Saskatchewan) Robyn Silvernagle	5
6	(Alberta) Chelsea Carey	4

Semifinals
1	(Sweden) Anna Hasselborg	5
5	(Alberta) Casey Scheidegger	4
7	(Manitoba) Kerri Einarson	7
3	(Saskatchewan) Robyn Silvernagle	4

Final
1	(Sweden) Anna Hasselborg	4
7	(Manitoba) Kerri Einarson	5

==== Quarterfinals ====
Saturday, April 13, 12:00 pm

Sheet A	1	2	3	4	5	6	7	8	Final
(Manitoba) Tracy Fleury 🔨	0	1	0	0	0	2	0	1	4
(Manitoba) Kerri Einarson	1	0	0	2	1	0	2	0	6

Player percentages
(Manitoba) Team Fleury		(Manitoba) Team Einarson	
Kristin MacCuish	97%	Briane Meilleur	91%
Taylor McDonald	82%	Shannon Birchard	87%
Selena Njegovan	71%	Val Sweeting	85%
Tracy Fleury	79%	Kerri Einarson	82%
Total	82%	Total	86%

Sheet B	1	2	3	4	5	6	7	8	Final
(Manitoba) Jennifer Jones	0	0	1	0	2	0	2	0	5
(Alberta) Casey Scheidegger 🔨	2	1	0	2	0	1	0	0	6

Player percentages
(Manitoba) Team Jones		(Alberta) Team Scheidegger	
Dawn McEwen	91%	Kristie Moore	79%
Jocelyn Peterman	92%	Jessie Haughian	95%
Kaitlyn Lawes	80%	Cary-Anne McTaggart	71%
Jennifer Jones	75%	Casey Scheidegger	85%
Total	85%	Total	82%

Sheet C	1	2	3	4	5	6	7	8	Final
(Saskatchewan) Robyn Silvernagle 🔨	0	2	0	0	1	0	0	2	5
(Alberta) Chelsea Carey	0	0	0	1	0	2	1	0	4

Player percentages
(Saskatchewan) Team Silvernagle		(Alberta) Team Carey	
Kara Thevenot	87%	Rachelle Brown	77%
Jessie Hunkin	93%	Dana Ferguson	69%
Stefanie Lawton	83%	Sarah Wilkes	85%
Robyn Silvernagle	75%	Chelsea Carey	81%
Total	84%	Total	78%

Sheet D	1	2	3	4	5	6	7	8	Final
(Sweden) Anna Hasselborg 🔨	2	0	0	2	0	0	0	1	5
(Japan) Satsuki Fujisawa	0	0	1	0	1	1	1	0	4

Player percentages
(Sweden) Team Hasselborg		(Japan) Team Fujisawa	
Sofia Mabergs	84%	Yurika Yoshida	75%
Agnes Knochenhauer	87%	Yumi Suzuki	70%
Sara McManus	84%	Chinami Yoshida	82%
Anna Hasselborg	82%	Satsuki Fujisawa	73%
Total	84%	Total	75%

==== Semifinals ====
Saturday, April 13, 8:00 pm

Sheet A	1	2	3	4	5	6	7	8	9	Final
(Sweden) Anna Hasselborg 🔨	1	0	0	2	0	1	0	0	1	5
(Alberta) Casey Scheidegger	0	0	1	0	1	0	1	1	0	4

Player percentages
(Sweden) Team Hasselborg		(Alberta) Team Scheidegger	
Sofia Mabergs	84%	Kristie Moore	87%
Agnes Knochenhauer	87%	Jessie Haughian	76%
Sara McManus	79%	Cary-Anne McTaggart	80%
Anna Hasselborg	78%	Casey Scheidegger	80%
Total	82%	Total	81%

Sheet B	1	2	3	4	5	6	7	8	Final
(Manitoba) Kerri Einarson	0	0	2	0	2	0	3	X	7
(Saskatchewan) Robyn Silvernagle 🔨	1	0	0	1	0	2	0	X	4

Player percentages
(Manitoba) Team Einarson		(Saskatchewan) Team Silvernagle	
Briane Meilleur	67%	Kara Thevenot	82%
Shannon Birchard	68%	Jessie Hunkin	59%
Val Sweeting	69%	Stefanie Lawton	79%
Kerri Einarson	76%	Robyn Silvernagle	51%
Total	70%	Total	68%

==== Final ====
Sunday, April 14, 4:00 pm

Sheet C	1	2	3	4	5	6	7	8	9	Final
(Sweden) Anna Hasselborg 🔨	0	0	2	0	1	0	0	1	0	4
(Manitoba) Kerri Einarson	0	1	0	1	0	2	0	0	1	5

Player percentages
(Sweden) Team Hasselborg		(Manitoba) Team Einarson	
Sofia Mabergs	78%	Briane Meilleur	85%
Agnes Knochenhauer	85%	Shannon Birchard	85%
Sara McManus	94%	Val Sweeting	90%
Anna Hasselborg	81%	Kerri Einarson	83%
Total	85%	Total	86%
