= Briane Harris =

Canadian curler (born 1992)

- Curler
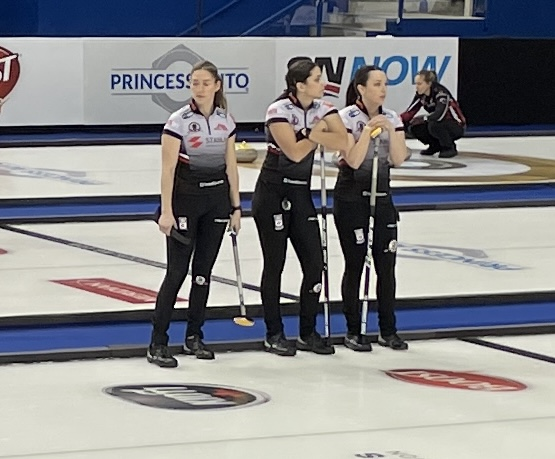
- Harris (left), Shannon Birchard, and Val Sweeting at the 2022 Players' Championship
- Born: March 11, 1992 (age 34); Winnipeg, Manitoba

Team
- Curling club: Gimli CC, Gimli, MB; Petersfield CC; Petersfield, MB
- Mixed doubles partner: Kyle Doering

Curling career
- Member Association: Manitoba
- Hearts: 6 (2016, 2018, 2020, 2021, 2022, 2023)
- World Championship: 3 (2021, 2022, 2023)
- Pan Continental Championship: 2 (2022, 2023)
- Top CTRS ranking: 1st (2019–20, 2022–23)
- Grand Slam victories: 4 (2019 Players', 2021 Players', 2022 Champions Cup, 2022 Masters)
Medal record
Women's curling
Representing Canada
World Championships
Bronze medal – third place	2022 Prince George
Bronze medal – third place	2023 Sandviken
Pan Continental Championships
Bronze medal – third place	2022 Calgary
Scotties Tournament of Hearts
Gold medal – first place	2021 Calgary
Gold medal – first place	2022 Thunder Bay
Gold medal – first place	2023 Kamloops
Representing Manitoba
Scotties Tournament of Hearts
Gold medal – first place	2020 Moose Jaw

Briane Harris (born March 11, 1992, as Briane Meilleur) is a Canadian curler from Petersfield, Manitoba.

Harris was a member of the Kerri Einarson rink from 2018 until being suspended from competitive curling in 2024 due to testing positive for Ligandrol, which she was found to have not been responsible for. With Einarson, Harris is a four-time Scotties Tournament of Hearts champion, winning the title in 2020, 2021, 2022 and 2023. She has also won four Grand Slam of Curling events with the Einarson rink.

== Career ==
Harris had a fairly successful junior career playing third for Breanne Knapp, winning the Manitoba junior title in 2010 and 2011 and competing in the 2010 and 2011 Canadian Junior Curling Championships. She won the bronze medal in 2011.

She began her senior career as a skip in the 2011–12 season, and played in her first Grand Slam, the 2011 Manitoba Lotteries Women's Curling Classic.

After playing for several different teams, she began to skip her own rink again in the 2016–17 and 2017–18 season. She competed in the 2017 Road to the Roar Canadian Olympic Curling Pre-Trials with Breanne Knapp, Janelle Vachon, and Sarah Neufeld, but the team missed out on a chance to qualify for the trials following losses to Julie Tippin and Krista McCarville.

For the 2018–19 season, Harris joined Kerri Einarson's new team as the lead. The team gained some attention for being made up entirely of former skips. They began the season by winning three straight World Curling Tour events in three weeks: the 2018 Stu Sells Oakville Tankard, the inaugural Morris SunSpiel and then the Mother Club Fall Curling Classic with a fourth win at the Curlers Corner Autumn Gold Classic in October. In December, the team lost in the finals of the 2018 Canada Cup and 2018 National. Their strong play during the early part of the season earned them enough points to put team Einarson in the Wild Card game at the 2019 Scotties Tournament of Hearts. However the team lost to the lower ranked Casey Scheidegger rink. The team would rebound to have a strong finish at the end of the season, winning the 2019 Players' Championship and losing in the final of the 2019 Champions Cup.

Team Einarson had two playoff finishes at the first two Slams of the 2019–20 season, losing to Anna Hasselborg in the quarterfinal of the Masters and once again to Hasselborg in the final of the Tour Challenge. The team did not have the same success at the Canada Cup as they did in 2018, finishing with a 2–4 record. However, at the 2020 Manitoba Scotties Tournament of Hearts, her team succeeded. They finished the round robin and championship round with a 7–1 record which qualified them for the final. In the final, they defeated Jennifer Jones. It was Harris' first Manitoba Scotties Tournament of Hearts provincial title. Team Einarson represented Manitoba at the 2020 Scotties Tournament of Hearts, where they continued their success. They finished first in the round robin with a 9–2 record and then won the 1 vs. 2 page playoff game, qualifying them for the final. Harris would win her first Canadian Championship when they defeated Rachel Homan 8–7 in and extra end. The team was set to represent Canada at the 2020 World Women's Curling Championship before the event got cancelled due to the COVID-19 pandemic. The Scotties would be their last event of the season as both the Players' Championship and the Champions Cup Grand Slam events were also cancelled due to the pandemic.

Team Einarson returned to the Scotties Tournament of Hearts in 2021 as Team Canada. They went 7–1 in the round robin, with their only loss coming against Ontario's Rachel Homan. This qualified them for the championship round. There, they won three games and lost one to Manitoba's Jennifer Jones. They advanced to the playoffs as the second seed, defeating Alberta's Laura Walker 9–3 in the semifinal. In the final, they defeated Homan to win their second consecutive Scotties gold. A month later, Harris was back in the Calgary bubble to compete with Mark Nichols at the 2021 Canadian Mixed Doubles Curling Championship. The pair failed to qualify for the playoffs, posting a 3–3 round robin record. Harris returned to the bubble for a third time in April 2021, along with her women's team to play in the two only Grand Slam events of the abbreviated season. The team made it to the semifinals of the 2021 Champions Cup where they lost to Team Homan, but got their revenge at the 2021 Players' Championship a week later, where they beat Homan in the final. The following week, Team Einarson represented Canada at the 2021 World Women's Curling Championship. The team had a slow start to the event, falling to 1–5 after their first six games. They turned things around, however, winning six of their seven remaining round robin games to qualifying for the playoffs. They then faced Sweden's Anna Hasselborg in the qualification game, which they lost 8–3.

The Einarson rink had a slow start to the 2021–22 season, failing to win any of their first five tour events. Their best finish came at the 2021 Sherwood Park Women's Curling Classic where they lost in the final to Tracy Fleury. The team reached the quarterfinals of the 2021 Masters, however, then missed the playoffs at the 2021 National. At the 2021 Canadian Olympic Curling Trials, the team went through the round robin with a 4–4 record. This earned them a spot in the first tiebreaker, where they defeated Casey Scheidegger 8–6. They then faced Krista McCarville in the second tiebreaker, where they lost 4–3 and were eliminated. The team's next event was the 2022 Scotties Tournament of Hearts in Thunder Bay, Ontario. Through the round robin, the defending Scotties champions posted a perfect 8–0 record, earning a spot in the playoffs. They then lost in the seeding round to New Brunswick's Andrea Crawford, meaning they would have to win three straight games to defend their championship title. In the playoffs, the team won the 3 vs. 4 page playoff against Team Fleury and then defeated New Brunswick's Crawford in the semifinal to reach the Scotties final where they would face Northern Ontario's McCarville rink. After controlling the entire game, Team Einarson sealed the victory with a steal of one in the tenth end. With the win, they became just the fourth team to win three consecutive Scotties titles. They then went on to represent Canada at the 2022 World Women's Curling Championship, where they fared much better than in 2021. The team finished the round robin tied for second place with a 9–3 record, however, due to their draw shot challenge, finished third overall. This placed them in the qualification game where they defeated Denmark's Madeleine Dupont to advance to the semifinal. There, they took on South Korea's Kim Eun-jung. After taking control in the seventh end, South Korea stole the ninth and tenth ends to hand the Canadian team a 9–6 loss. They were able to rebound in the bronze medal game with an 8–7 victory over Sweden's Anna Hasselborg. Team Einarson wrapped up their season at the final two Slams of the season. At the 2022 Players' Championship, they made it all the way to the final where they were defeated by the Hasselborg rink. At the 2022 Champions Cup, the team secured their third Grand Slam title as a foursome with a 10–6 victory over Gim Eun-ji.

The 2022–23 season began for Team Einarson at the 2022 PointsBet Invitational single elimination event where they entered as the top seeded team. After defeating Tracey Larocque and Kelsey Rocque, they lost 9–5 to the new Jennifer Jones rink in the semifinal. The team next played in the first Slam of the year, the 2022 National, where they lost 7–3 to Silvana Tirinzoni in the event final. They also reached the final of the 2022 Tour Challenge where they lost 8–4 to Rachel Homan. Team Einarson was chosen to represent Canada at the 2022 Pan Continental Curling Championships where they qualified for the playoffs as the second seeds with a 7–1 record. They then lost 6–5 to Japan in the semifinal but rebounded to beat the United States in the bronze medal game. The team won their fourth Grand Slam together by going undefeated to claim the 2022 Masters. In December, they travelled to Japan to compete in the 2022 Karuizawa International Curling Championships where they lost in the final to Kim Eun-jung. In the new year, Team Einarson made it to another Slam final where they lost 5–3 to Satsuki Fujisawa. Returning to the 2023 Scotties Tournament of Hearts as Team Canada, the team again went undefeated through the round robin but lost in the page seeding game to Manitoba's Jones. They then won both the 3 vs. 4 game and the semifinal over Nova Scotia and Northern Ontario respectively to reach another national final where they again faced Jones. After trading singles, Team Canada stole two in the fifth end to open a two-point lead. They secured their record tying fourth Scotties title with a score of five in the ninth end. The team then advanced to the 2023 World Women's Curling Championship where they reached the playoffs again with a 7–5 record. After defeating Japan in the qualification game, they lost in the semifinals for a second year in a row, 8–5 to Norway. They won another bronze medal after an 8–5 win over Sweden. Team Einarson reached the semifinals of the 2023 Players' Championship where they fell 10–3 to Isabella Wranå. Harris missed the team's last event of the season, the 2023 Champions Cup, as she was on maternity leave. She was replaced by Dawn McEwen and Team Einarson lost 6–5 to Team Homan in the championship game.

Team Einarson reached the quarterfinals in their first event of the 2023–24 season, falling to Serena Gray-Withers at the 2023 Saville Shootout. The team then played in the 2023 PointsBet Invitational where they lost in the final to Team Homan. For the second year in a row, they were chosen to represent Canada at the 2023 Pan Continental Curling Championships. The team did not have a great week, however, losing both the semifinal and bronze medal game to finish fourth. In Grand Slam play, Team Einarson failed to reach any finals for the first time since forming. They had three semifinal finishes and one quarterfinal appearance before missing the playoffs at the 2024 Players' Championship, breaking their streak of qualifying at the previous twelve Slams.

=== Suspension ===
A few hours prior to the first draw of the 2024 Scotties Tournament of Hearts, Curling Canada announced that Harris was deemed "ineligible" to play in the tournament without going into any more detail. She was replaced by alternate Krysten Karwacki. Despite the disturbance, Team Einarson managed a 7–1 record through the round robin to qualify for the championship round. Once there, however, they lost both their games to Team Homan and Manitoba's Kate Cameron, eliminating them from contention and ending their chance of a record setting fifth straight Scotties title. Following the event, in March, it was revealed that Harris had been provisionally suspended for up to four years for testing positive for Ligandrol, a banned substance. Harris claimed she was unknowingly exposed to the substance, and planned to appeal the decision to the Court of Arbitration for Sport.

On January 14, 2025, the Court of Arbitration for Sport decided that Harris was eligible to return to competition, stating that "she bears no fault or negligence for the violation and 'no period of ineligibility' is imposed". She was represented by Dr. Emir Crowne and Amanda Fowler.

During her suspension, Harris could not curl competitively. When she was ruled eligible to play, she did not join Team Einarson at the 2025 Scotties. In March, it was announced that she was leaving the team and joining Team Kate Cameron as third.

== Personal life ==
Harris formerly worked as a CAD Technician for EuroCraft Office Furnishings. She married Tory Harris in August 2022 and has two sons.

== Teams ==
Season	Skip	Third	Second	Lead
2011–12	Briane Meilleur	Krysten Karwacki	Amy Agnew	Meagan Grenkow
2012–13	Selena Kaatz	Briane Meilleur	Kristin MacCuish	Katherine Doerksen
2013–14	Breanne Knapp	Katherine Doerksen	Briane Meilleur	Krysten Karwacki
2014–15	Jill Thurston	Brette Richards	Briane Meilleur	Krysten Karwacki
2015–16	Cathy Overton-Clapham	Briane Meilleur	Katherine Doerksen	Krysten Karwacki
2016–17	Briane Meilleur	Rhonda Varnes	Janelle Vachon	Sarah Neufeld
2017–18	Briane Meilleur	Breanne Knapp	Janelle Vachon	Sarah Neufeld
2018–19	Kerri Einarson	Val Sweeting	Shannon Birchard	Briane Meilleur
2019–20	Kerri Einarson	Val Sweeting	Shannon Birchard	Briane Meilleur
2020–21	Kerri Einarson	Val Sweeting	Shannon Birchard	Briane Meilleur
2021–22	Kerri Einarson	Val Sweeting	Shannon Birchard	Briane Meilleur
2022–23	Kerri Einarson	Val Sweeting	Shannon Birchard	Briane Harris
2023–24	Kerri Einarson	Val Sweeting	Shannon Birchard	Briane Harris
2025–26	Kate Cameron	Briane Harris	Taylor McDonald	Mackenzie Elias
