= Kara Thevenot =

Canadian curler

- Curler
- Born: Kara Kilden; December 4, 1988 (age 37); Saskatoon, Saskatchewan

Team
- Curling club: Twin Rivers CC, North Battleford, SK
- Skip: Robyn Silvernagle
- Third: Kelly Schafer
- Second: Chaelynn Kitz
- Lead: Kara Thevenot

Curling career
- Member Association: Saskatchewan
- Hearts: 3 (2019, 2020, 2023)
- Top CTRS ranking: 6th (2018–19)
Medal record
Women's curling
Representing Saskatchewan
Scotties Tournament of Hearts
Bronze medal – third place	2019 Sydney

Kara Thevenot (English: /ˈtɛvənoʊ/, French: [tevəno]; born December 4, 1988, as Kara Kilden) is a Canadian curler from Prince Albert, Saskatchewan. She currently plays lead on Team Robyn Silvernagle. She is a three-time Saskatchewan Scotties Tournament of Hearts champion, winning the title in 2019, 2020 and 2023.

== Career ==
Thevenot joined the Robyn Silvernagle rink in 2015. Before joining, she played with skips Samantha Yachiw, Brandee Borne and Nancy Martin. In their first season together, the new team found some success winning the qualifier and coming third overall in the 2016 Saskatchewan Scotties Tournament of Hearts. The next year, Thevenot's team lost the final of the 2017 Saskatchewan Scotties Tournament of Hearts to Penny Barker. After winning the 2017 Boundary Ford Curling Classic, The Silvernagle rink once again lost the Saskatchewan Scotties final, this time in an extra end against Sherry Anderson.

For the 2018–19 curling season, Thevenot and Silvernagle added veteran third Stefanie Lawton and second Jessie Hunkin to their team. Silvernagle's team had a strong start to the season, winning the 2018 Red Deer Curling Classic and Saskatchewan Women's Curling Tour events in Humboldt and Saskatoon. With the 2019 Canadian Open being held in North Battleford, her rink qualified for her first Grand Slam event as the sponsor's exemption. Her team qualified for the playoffs with a 3–1 record in the triple knockout format, before losing to Silvana Tirinzoni in the quarterfinal.

After losing the final twice, Team Silvernagle won the 2019 Saskatchewan Scotties Tournament of Hearts with a steal in the final end against Sherry Anderson, her first provincial title. Representing Saskatchewan at the 2019 Scotties Tournament of Hearts, the team went 8–3 in the round robin and championship pools, before eventually losing the semi-final to Ontario and winning the bronze medal. The rink had semi-final finish at the 2019 Players' Championship and a quarterfinal finish at the 2019 Champions Cup to finish off their season.

Team Silvernagle missed the playoffs in the first two Slams of the 2019–20 season, the Masters and the Tour Challenge. She also competed in her first Canada Cup where her team finished with a 1–5 record. They defended their provincial title at the 2020 Saskatchewan Scotties Tournament of Hearts when they once again bested Sherry Anderson in the final. At the 2020 Scotties Tournament of Hearts, Team Silvernagle led Saskatchewan to a 6–5 record, finishing in fifth. It would be the team's last event of the season as both the Players' Championship and the Champions Cup Grand Slam events were cancelled due to the COVID-19 pandemic. On March 11, 2020, it was announced that Team Silvernagle would be parting ways with Thevenot.

After taking a few seasons off from competitive curling, Thevenot returned for the 2022–23 season as lead for Silvernagle. The team also included Kelly Schafer and Sherry Just with the goal of representing Saskatchewan at the 2023 Scotties Tournament of Hearts. They entered the last chance qualifier for the provincial championship only having had one practice as a team. After losing their first game, they rattled off five straight victories to qualify for 2023 Saskatchewan Scotties Tournament of Hearts in Estevan. There, they continued to build momentum with wins over many higher ranked teams to qualify for the playoffs through the B side. After dropping the 1 vs. 2 game to Nancy Martin, Team Silvernagle bounced back to beat Sherry Anderson in the semifinal to qualify for the provincial final. Facing Team Martin once again, Team Silvernagle took the lead in the second end and never trailed en route to an 8–4 victory and the 2023 Saskatchewan provincial championship title. This qualified Thevenot for her third Scotties which was held in Kamloops, British Columbia. The team struggled at the national championship, finishing 2–6 through the round robin with wins over Alberta's Kayla Skrlik and Nunavut's Brigitte MacPhail.

== Personal life ==
Thevenot works as a sales agronomist with Lake County Co-op. She is married and has two children.

== Teams ==
Season	Skip	Third	Second	Lead
2009–10	Samantha Yachiw	Brett Barber	Kara Kilden	Krista White
2010–11	Brandee Borne	Julie Vandenameele	Kara Kilden	Andrea Rudulier
2011–12	Brandee Borne	Kara Kilden	Andrea Rudulier	Jen Buettner
2012–13	Nancy Martin	Kara Kilden	Lindsay Bertschi	Krista White
2015–16	Robyn Silvernagle	Dayna Demers	Cristina Goertzen	Kara Kilden
2016–17	Robyn Silvernagle	Dayna Demers	Cristina Goertzen	Kara Thevenot
2017–18	Robyn Silvernagle	Jolene Campbell	Dayna Demers	Kara Thevenot
2018–19	Robyn Silvernagle	Stefanie Lawton	Jessie Hunkin	Kara Thevenot
2019–20	Robyn Silvernagle	Stefanie Lawton	Jessie Hunkin	Kara Thevenot
2022–23	Robyn Silvernagle	Kelly Schafer	Sherry Just	Kara Thevenot
2023–24	Robyn Silvernagle	Kelly Schafer	Chaelynn Kitz	Kara Thevenot
