= Sherry Just =

Canadian curler

- Curler
- Born: June 17, 1986 (age 40); Winnipeg, Manitoba

Team
- Curling club: Prince Albert G&CC, Prince Albert, SK
- Mixed doubles partner: Kyle Cherpin

Curling career
- Member Association: Manitoba (2010–2011); Saskatchewan (2011–present)
- Hearts: 1 (2023)
- Top CTRS ranking: 46th (2018–19)

Sherry Just (born June 17, 1986) is a Canadian curler from Prince Albert, Saskatchewan.

== Career ==
=== Women's ===
Just began competing on the World Curling Tour during the 2010–11 season. After the season, she moved to Saskatchewan. She qualified for the playoffs at the 2012 DEKALB Superspiel, losing in the quarterfinals. She also played in the Colonial Square Ladies Classic Grand Slam of Curling event in 2013 and 2014 but failed to qualify on both occasions.

She played in her first Saskatchewan Scotties Tournament of Hearts in 2016 as second for Nancy Martin. They finished 1–4, failing to advance. She returned the following season, playing third for Brett Barber. After going 4–4 through the round robin, they lost the tiebreaker to eventual winners Penny Barker. Some of her notable finishes on tour include semifinal finishes at the 2017 Boundary Ford Curling Classic and the 2018 Medicine Hat Charity Classic. At the 2019 Saskatchewan Scotties Tournament of Hearts, she skipped her own team to a 4–4 finish.

=== Mixed doubles ===
Aside from her women's team, Just also plays Mixed doubles curling. In 2016, she played with Derek Samagalski at the 2016 Canadian Mixed Doubles Curling Trials, finishing 3–4. She played with Ryan Deis at the 2017 and 2018 Canadian Mixed Doubles Curling Championship, reaching the quarterfinals in 2017. She also played with Tyrel Griffith at the 2018 Canadian Mixed Doubles Curling Olympic Trials, going 3–5.

== Personal life ==
Just is employed as the executive director and occupational therapist at the Saskatchewan Society of Occupational Therapists. She studied at the University of Manitoba.

== Teams ==
Season	Skip	Third	Second	Lead
2010–11	Sherry Just	Ashley Surminski	Cheryl Ormonde	Heather Carson
2011–12	Sherry Just	Melissa Klebeck	Sharlene Clarke	Alysha Shillington
2012–13	Sherry Just	Alyssa Kostyk	Sharlene Clarke	Jenna Hope
2013–14	Sherry Just	Alyssa Kostyk	Jenna Hope	Sharlene Clarke
2014–15	Sherry Just	Amanda Labach	Michelle Chabot	Jessica Mitchell
2015–16	Nancy Martin	Taryn Schachtel	Sherry Just	Jinaye Yanota
2016–17	Brett Barber	Sherry Just	Robyn Despins	Rachel Fritzer
2017–18	Mandy Selzer	Erin Barnhart	Sherry Just	Donda-Lee Deis
2018–19	Sherry Just	Megan Anderson	Ellen Redlick	Hanna Anderson
2019–20	Sherry Just	Deborah Hawkshaw	Jade Goebel	Dallas Gould
2020–21	Sherry Just	Deborah Hawkshaw	Sarah Hoag	Alison Ingram
2021–22	Sherry Just	Holly Scott	Alison Ingram	Deborah Hawkshaw
2022–23	Robyn Silvernagle	Kelly Schafer	Sherry Just	Kara Thevenot
2023–24	Sherry Just	Abbey Johnson	Kailee Popowich	Hanna Anderson
2025–26	Sherry Just	Jenna Enge	Jade Kerr	Jasmine Kerr
