= Jessie Hunkin =

Canadian curler

- Curler
- Born: Jessica Kaufman; August 24, 1988 (age 38); Edmonton, Alberta

Team
- Curling club: Avonair CC, Edmonton, AB
- Skip: Robyn Silvernagle
- Third: Jessie Hunkin
- Second: Jessie Haughian
- Lead: Kristie Moore

Curling career
- Member Association: Alberta (2008–2018; 2022–present); Saskatchewan (2018–2022)
- Hearts: 2 (2019, 2020)
- Top CTRS ranking: 6th (2018-19)
Medal record
Women's curling
Representing Saskatchewan
Scotties Tournament of Hearts
Bronze medal – third place	2019 Sydney

Jessica "Jessie" Hunkin (born August 24, 1988, née Kaufman) is a Canadian curler from Parkland County, Alberta. She currently plays third on Team Robyn Silvernagle.

== Career ==
Until joining the Robyn Silvernagle rink in 2018, Hunkin skipped or threw last stones one of the top teams in Alberta. Since forming her rink in 2008, she has won four WCT events: the 2010 Meyers Norris Penny Charity Classic, the 2011 Boundary Ford Curling Classic, the 2012 Iron Trail Motors Shoot-Out and the 2013 Avonair Cash Spiel. Her team were also runners up at the 2010 Red Deer Curling Classic, the 2013 Shamrock Shotgun and the Boundary Ford Curling Classic.

Hunkin played in her first Grand Slam event at the 2011 Players' Championship where her team won just one game, failing to qualify for the playoffs. The next season, she played in two Grand Slam events. At the 2011 Curlers Corner Autumn Gold Curling Classic she won just won match before being eliminated and at the 2011 Manitoba Lotteries Women's Curling Classic her team failed to win a single game. The next season, Team Hunkin did much better at the 2012 Curlers Corner Autumn Gold Curling Classic where they won four matches, before being eliminated in a qualifier game against Laura Crocker. At the 2012 Manitoba Lotteries Women's Curling Classic the team won three games before being eliminated and at the 2012 The Masters Grand Slam of Curling she won just one game.

Provincially, Hunkin has played in two provincial championships. At the 2011 Alberta Scotties Tournament of Hearts she and her team were eliminated after winning two matches. The 2012 Alberta Scotties Tournament of Hearts was much more successful for the team. They won the A qualifier, by winning four straight games, and then they won their first page playoff match up against Heather Nedohin. However, Nedohin won her semi-final and faced off against Hunkin in the provincial final, and prevailed, beating her 8-5 and going on to win the national championship and a bronze medal at the world championships. At the following season's provincial Tournament of Hearts, her rink would be eliminated from contention after a 3–3 record.

In 2013, Tiffany Steuber joined the team as skip, but threw third stones. The team began the 2013-14 Grand Slam season by being eliminated after losing their first three games at the 2013 Curlers Corner Autumn Gold Curling Classic. At the 2014 Alberta Scotties Tournament of Hearts, the team won four games, but were eliminated in the C event.

In 2014, Hunkin formed a new team with Crystal Webster skipping and throwing third stones. They played in two slams, the 2014 Curlers Corner Autumn Gold Curling Classic, where they won two games and the 2014 Colonial Square Ladies Classic, where they won three games, failing to make the playoffs in either event. At the 2015 Alberta Scotties Tournament of Hearts, they would make it as far as the C2 qualifier final before being eliminated.

In 2015, Hunkin formed yet another new team, this time with her returning to skipping. While her rink didn't play in any slams, they did play in the 2016 Alberta Scotties Tournament of Hearts. There, Hunkin led to her team into the playoffs, where she lost in the semifinal to Chelsea Carey. That same year, Hunkin and Brock Virtue won the Alberta Mixed Doubles Championship, and played in the 2016 Canadian Mixed Doubles Curling Trials. There, the pair went 3–4 in pool play, missing the playoffs.

Hunkin wouldn't return to the Alberta Scotties until 2018. Her team would go through the event without a single win. After that season, Hunkin joined the Robyn Silvernagle Saskatchewan-based rink as the team's second. The team had a strong start to the season, winning the 2018 Red Deer Curling Classic and Saskatchewan Women's Curling Tour events in Humboldt and Saskatoon. With the 2019 Canadian Open being held in North Battleford, the Silvernagle rink qualified for the event as the sponsor's exemption. The team qualified for the playoffs with a 3–1 record in the triple knockout format, before losing to Silvana Tirinzoni in the quarter-final.

The Silvernagle rink won the 2019 Saskatchewan Scotties Tournament of Hearts with a steal in the final end against Sherry Anderson. Representing Saskatchewan at the 2019 Scotties Tournament of Hearts, the rink went 8–3 in the round robin and championship pools, before eventually losing the semi-final to Ontario and winning the bronze medal. The team had semi-final and quarterfinal finishes at the 2019 Players' Championship and the 2019 Champions Cup respectively.

Team Silvernagle missed the playoffs in the first two Slams of the 2019–20 season, the Masters and the Tour Challenge. She also competed in her first Canada Cup where her team finished with a 1–5 record. They defended their provincial title at the 2020 Saskatchewan Scotties Tournament of Hearts when they once again bested Sherry Anderson in the final. At the 2020 Scotties Tournament of Hearts, Team Silvernagle led Saskatchewan to a 6–5 record, finishing in fifth. It would be the team's last event of the season as both the Players' Championship and the Champions Cup Grand Slam events were cancelled due to the COVID-19 pandemic. On March 11, 2020, the team announced that Lawton would be stepping back from competitive curling and Thevenot would be leaving the team. Five days later, Silvernagle and Hunkin announced that Kristen Streifel and Dayna Demers would be joining them for the following season.

Due to the COVID-19 pandemic in Saskatchewan, the 2021 Saskatchewan Scotties Tournament of Hearts was cancelled. Despite being the defending provincial champions, Team Silvernagle did not retain three out of four team members from the previous season and could therefore not qualify as the provincial representatives. Team Sherry Anderson was then invited to represent Saskatchewan at the 2021 Scotties Tournament of Hearts, as they had the most points from the 2019–20 and 2020–21 seasons combined, which they accepted. This ended the abbreviated 2020–21 season for the newly formed Silvernagle rink.

On maternity leave, Robyn Silvernagle did not play with the team for their first few events of the 2021–22 season. Hunkin took over skipping duties during this time, with Becca Hebert coming in to throw second. Due to the COVID-19 pandemic in Canada, the qualification process for the 2021 Canadian Olympic Curling Trials had to be modified to qualify enough teams for the championship. In these modifications, Curling Canada created the 2021 Canadian Curling Pre-Trials Direct-Entry Event, an event where eight teams would compete to try to earn one of two spots into the 2021 Canadian Olympic Curling Pre-Trials. Team Silvernagle qualified for the Pre-Trials Direct-Entry Event as the third seed. The team qualified for the playoffs through the B Event, giving them two chances to secure a spot in the Pre-Trials. They then, however, lost 10–8 to Kerry Galusha and 8–6 to Jill Brothers, finishing third and not advancing. With Silvernagle back in the lineup, the team qualified for three straight quarterfinals at the Boundary Ford Curling Classic, the SaskTour Women's Moose Jaw event and the Red Deer Curling Classic. In December 2021, they won the Swift Current Women's Spiel, defeating Michelle Englot 8–3 in the championship game. In the new year, Team Silvernagle competed in the 2022 Saskatchewan Scotties Tournament of Hearts where they entered as the third seeds. They qualified for the playoffs through the C Event before being eliminated by Amber Holland in the 3 vs. 4 page playoff game. Robyn Silvernagle left the team following the season with Hunkin becoming the full-time skip for the 2022–23 season.

In their third event, Team Hunkin reached the semifinals of the Prestige Hotels & Resorts Curling Classic, losing to Ikue Kitazawa. They then played in the 2022 Tour Challenge Tier 2 where after dropping their opening game, they ran the table to reach the final. There, they were defeated 8–2 by Clancy Grandy. After two more quarterfinal appearances, the team played in the 2023 Alberta Scotties Tournament of Hearts where they finished in fifth place with a 3–4 record. Kristen Streifel then left the team and was replaced by Jessie Haughian. To begin the 2023–24 season, the team had three consecutive quarterfinal appearances. Their best finish came at the Saville Grand Prix with a semifinal loss to Selena Sturmay. At the 2024 Alberta Scotties Tournament of Hearts, the team bettered their performance with a 4–3 record but did not qualify for the playoffs based on their draw-to-the-button total.

== Personal life ==
Hunkin is married and is a manager at Olson Curling Inc.
