= Robyn Silvernagle =

Canadian curler

- Curler
- Born: May 20, 1987 (age 39); Biggar, Saskatchewan, Canada

Team
- Curling club: Twin Rivers CC, North Battleford, SK
- Skip: Skylar Ackerman
- Third: Robyn Silvernagle
- Second: Rachel Big Eagle
- Lead: Mary Little

Curling career
- Member Association: Saskatchewan (2005–2024; 2025–Present); Alberta (2024–2025)
- Hearts: 4 (2019, 2020, 2023, 2026)
- Top CTRS ranking: 6th (2018-19)
Medal record
Women's curling
Representing Saskatchewan
Scotties Tournament of Hearts
Bronze medal – third place	2019 Sydney

Robyn Silvernagle (born May 20, 1987) is a Canadian curler from Bushell Park, Saskatchewan. She currently is the third on Team Skylar Ackerman. She is a three-time Saskatchewan Scotties Tournament of Hearts champion, winning the title in 2019, 2020 and 2023.

== Career ==
Silvernagle represented Saskatchewan at the 2005 Canadian Junior Curling Championships, finishing the event with a 7–5 record and missing the playoffs.

Silvernagle has skipped her own team since the 2009–10 curling season. Her team won the 2010 Cornerstone Credit Union Ladies Cash Bonspiel. After joining Brett Barber's rink as a third for the 2012–13 curling season and then the Brenda Goertzen rink as fourth during the 2014–15 curling season, Silvernagle skipped her own team for the 2015–16 curling season. Her new team found some success winning the qualifier and coming third overall in the 2016 Saskatchewan Scotties Tournament of Hearts. The next year Silvernagle's team lost the final of the 2017 Saskatchewan Scotties Tournament of Hearts to Penny Barker. After winning the 2017 Boundary Ford Curling Classic, Silvernagle once again lost the Saskatchewan Scotties final, this time in an extra end against Sherry Anderson.

For the 2018–19 curling season, Silvernagle and lead Kara Thevenot added veteran third Stefanie Lawton and second Jessie Hunkin to their team. Silvernagle's team had a strong start to the season, winning the 2018 Red Deer Curling Classic and Saskatchewan Women's Curling Tour events in Humboldt and Saskatoon. With the 2019 Canadian Open being held in North Battleford, Silvernagle qualified for her first Grand Slam event as the sponsor's exemption. Silvernagle qualified for the playoffs with a 3–1 record in the triple knockout format, before losing to Silvana Tirinzoni in the quarter-final.

Silvernagle won the 2019 Saskatchewan Scotties Tournament of Hearts with a steal in the final end against Sherry Anderson, her first provincial title. Representing Saskatchewan at the 2019 Scotties Tournament of Hearts, Silvernagle went 8–3 in the round robin and championship pools, before eventually losing the semi-final to Ontario and winning the bronze medal. The rink had semi-final and quarterfinal finishes at the 2019 Players' Championship and the 2019 Champions Cup respectively.

Team Silvernagle missed the playoffs in the first two Slams of the 2019–20 season, the Masters and the Tour Challenge. She also competed in her first Canada Cup where her team finished with a 1–5 record. They defended their provincial title at the 2020 Saskatchewan Scotties Tournament of Hearts when they once again bested Sherry Anderson in the final. At the 2020 Scotties Tournament of Hearts, Team Silvernagle led Saskatchewan to a 6–5 record, finishing in fifth. It would be the team's last event of the season as both the Players' Championship and the Champions Cup Grand Slam events were cancelled due to the COVID-19 pandemic. On March 11, 2020, the team announced that Lawton would be stepping back from competitive curling and Thevenot would be leaving the team. Five days later, Silvernagle and Hunkin announced that Kristen Streifel and Dayna Demers would be joining them for the following season.

Due to the COVID-19 pandemic in Saskatchewan, the 2021 Saskatchewan Scotties Tournament of Hearts was cancelled. Despite being the defending provincial champions, Team Silvernagle did not retain three out of four team members from the previous season and could therefore not qualify as the provincial representatives. Team Sherry Anderson was then invited to represent Saskatchewan at the 2021 Scotties Tournament of Hearts, as they had the most points from the 2019–20 and 2020–21 seasons combined, which they accepted. This ended the abbreviated 2020–21 season for the newly formed Silvernagle rink.

On maternity leave, Silvernagle did not play with her team for the first few events of the 2021–22 season. Jessie Hunkin took over skipping duties during this time, with Becca Hebert coming in to throw second. Due to the COVID-19 pandemic in Canada, the qualification process for the 2021 Canadian Olympic Curling Trials had to be modified to qualify enough teams for the championship. In these modifications, Curling Canada created the 2021 Canadian Curling Pre-Trials Direct-Entry Event, an event where eight teams would compete to try to earn one of two spots into the 2021 Canadian Olympic Curling Pre-Trials. Team Silvernagle qualified for the Pre-Trials Direct-Entry Event as the third seed. The team qualified for the playoffs through the B Event, giving them two chances to secure a spot in the Pre-Trials. They then, however, lost 10–8 to Kerry Galusha and 8–6 to Jill Brothers, finishing third and not advancing. With Silvernagle back in the lineup, the team qualified for three straight quarterfinals at the Boundary Ford Curling Classic, the SaskTour Women's Moose Jaw event and the Red Deer Curling Classic. In December 2021, they won the Swift Current Women's Spiel, defeating Michelle Englot 8–3 in the championship game. In the new year, Team Silvernagle competed in the 2022 Saskatchewan Scotties Tournament of Hearts where they entered as the third seeds. They qualified for the playoffs through the C Event before being eliminated by Amber Holland in the 3 vs. 4 page playoff game. The team disbanded following the provincial championship.

While initially taking a step back for the 2022–23 season, Silvernagle formed a new team with Kelly Schafer, Sherry Just and longtime teammate Kara Thevenot with the goal of representing Saskatchewan at the 2023 Scotties Tournament of Hearts. They entered the last chance qualifier for the provincial championship only having had one practice as a team. After losing their first game, they rattled off five straight victories to qualify for 2023 Saskatchewan Scotties Tournament of Hearts in Estevan. There, they continued to build momentum with wins over many higher ranked teams to qualify for the playoffs through the B side. After dropping the 1 vs. 2 game to Nancy Martin, Team Silvernagle bounced back to beat Sherry Anderson in the semifinal to qualify for the provincial final. Facing Team Martin once again, Team Silvernagle took the lead in the second end and never trailed en route to an 8–4 victory and the 2023 Saskatchewan provincial championship title. This qualified Silvernagle for her third Scotties which was held in Kamloops, British Columbia. The team struggled at the national championship, finishing 2–6 through the round robin with wins over Alberta's Kayla Skrlik and Nunavut's Brigitte MacPhail.

Silvernagle would then join Jolene Campbell, Rachel Erickson and Dayna Demmans for the 2025–26 season. On tour, the team made one final in Moose Jaw and qualified in four other events. At provincials, they finished second through the round robin with a 6–2 record but then knocked off the previously undefeated Ashley Thevenot 10–7 to qualify for the championship game. Team Campbell would win their first provincial championship as a team, beating Jana Tisdale 4–3 in the final.

== Personal life ==
Silvernagle is married to Chad Guidinger and is the owner of Dazu Salon. She has three children.

== Grand Slam record ==
Key
C	Champion
F	Lost in Final
SF	Lost in Semifinal
QF	Lost in Quarterfinals
R16	Lost in the round of 16
Q	Did not advance to playoffs
T2	Played in Tier 2 event
DNP	Did not participate in event
N/A	Not a Grand Slam event that season

Event	2018–19	2019–20	2020–21	2021–22	2022–23	2023–24
Tour Challenge	DNP	Q	N/A	N/A	DNP	T2 (Note: Silvernagle spared for Becca Hebert on Team Jessie Hunkin.)
The National	DNP	QF	N/A	DNP	DNP	DNP
Masters	DNP	Q	N/A	DNP	DNP	DNP
Canadian Open	QF	DNP	N/A	N/A	DNP	DNP
Players'	SF	N/A	DNP	DNP	DNP	DNP
Champions Cup	QF	N/A	DNP	DNP	DNP	N/A

== Teams ==
Season	Skip	Third	Second	Lead
2009–10	Robyn Silvernagle	Sasha Yole	Dayna Demers	Kendra Syrota
2010–11	Robyn Silvernagle	Sasha Yole	Dayna Demers	Kara Thevenot
2011–12	Robyn Silvernagle	Kelsey Waker	Dayna Demers	Kara Thevenot
2012–13	Brett Barber	Robyn Silvernagle	Kailena McDonald	Dayna Demers
2014–15	Robyn Silvernagle (Fourth)	Brenda Goertzen (Skip)	Cristina Goertzen	Anita Silvernagle
2015–16	Robyn Silvernagle	Dayna Demers	Cristina Goertzen	Kara Thevenot
2016–17	Robyn Silvernagle	Dayna Demers	Cristina Goertzen	Kara Thevenot
2017–18	Robyn Silvernagle	Jolene Campbell	Dayna Demers	Kara Thevenot
2018–19	Robyn Silvernagle	Stefanie Lawton	Jessie Hunkin	Kara Thevenot
2019–20	Robyn Silvernagle	Stefanie Lawton	Jessie Hunkin	Kara Thevenot
2020–21	Robyn Silvernagle	Kristen Streifel	Jessie Hunkin	Dayna Demers
2021–22	Robyn Silvernagle	Kristen Streifel	Jessie Hunkin	Dayna Demers
2022–23	Robyn Silvernagle	Kelly Schafer	Sherry Just	Kara Thevenot
2023–24	Robyn Silvernagle	Kelly Schafer	Chaelynn Kitz	Kara Thevenot
2024–25	Robyn Silvernagle	Jessie Hunkin	Jessie Haughian	Kristie Moore
2025–26	Jolene Campbell	Robyn Silvernagle	Rachel Big Eagle	Dayna Demmans
2026–27	Skylar Ackerman	Robyn Silvernagle	Rachel Big Eagle	Mary Little
