= Boundary Ford Curling Classic =

World Curling Tour event

- Established: 2007
- Host city: Lloydminster, Saskatchewan
- Arena: Lloydminster Golf and Curling Centre
- Purse: $16,400
- 2021 champion: (South Korea) Gim Un-chi

Location in Canada

The Boundary Ford Curling Classic is an annual bonspiel, or curling tournament, that takes place every November at the Lloydminster Golf and Curling Centre in Lloydminster, Saskatchewan. The tournament, started in 2007 as part of the women's World Curling Tour, is held in a triple knockout format.

== Women's winners ==
Year	Winning skip	Runner up skip	Purse (CAD)	Winner's share
2007	(Alberta) Faye White	(Alberta) Chana Martineau	$22,000	$6,500
2008	(Alberta) Kristie Moore	(Alberta) Andrea McCutcheon	$30,000	$8,000
2009	(Alberta) Heather Nedohin	(Alberta) Heather Rankin	$32,000	$7,000
2010	(Alberta) Shannon Kleibrink	(Alberta) Heather Nedohin	$25,600	$7,000
2011	(Alberta) Jessie Kaufman	(Alberta) Dana Ferguson	$32,000	$8,000
2012	(Alberta) Renée Sonnenberg	(Alberta) Casey Scheidegger	$32,000	$8,000
2013	(Saskatchewan) Amber Holland	(Alberta) Jessie Kaufman	$32,000	$8,000
2014	(Alberta) Chelsea Carey	(Saskatchewan) Jolene Campbell	$24,000	$7,000
2015	(Alberta) Casey Scheidegger	(Saskatchewan) Brett Barber	$20,200	$5,000
2016	(Saskatchewan) Sherry Anderson	(Saskatchewan) Chantelle Eberle	$23,200	$6,500
2017	(Saskatchewan) Robyn Silvernagle	(Saskatchewan) Chantelle Eberle	$18,000	$5,000
2018	(Saskatchewan) Sherry Anderson	(China) Liu Sijia	$23,200	$6,500
2019	(South Korea) Kim Min-ji	(South Korea) Gim Un-chi	$27,000	$8,000
2020	Cancelled			
2021	(South Korea) Gim Un-chi	(South Korea) Kim Hye-rin	$16,400	$4,200
