= GSOC Invitational =

Annual Grand Slam of Curling event

- Established: 2015
- 2026 host city: Victoria, British Columbia
- 2026 arena: Save-On-Foods Memorial Centre
- Purse: CAD$200,000

Current champions (2026)
- Men: (Switzerland) Yannick Schwaller
- Women: (Manitoba) Kerri Einarson

Current edition
- 2026 GSOC Invitational

The GSOC Invitational, previously known as the Tour Challenge until 2026, is a bonspiel, or curling tournament, which is one of the Grand Slam of Curling events. It was first introduced into the Grand Slam lineup starting in the 2015–16 curling season.

Until 2026, the event featured a men's and women's draw, and was split into two tiers of 16 teams each, Tier 1 and Tier 2. The top 16 teams on the World Curling Federation team ranking qualify for the Tier 1 event, while the next top 16 teams qualify for the Tier 2 event. The winning team at the Tier 2 event qualifies for another Grand Slam, the Canadian Open. For the 2025 edition of the Tour Challenge, the Tier 2 event was replaced with a GSOC Jr. U25 Tour Challenge Event, to showcase the future of the sport and support the transition of teams from juniors to men's/women's play. From 2022 to 2023, the format consisted of four pools, where each team played all four of their games against the four teams of another pool. The top 8 teams overall made the playoffs. In 2023, tiebreakers were dropped. In 2024, the event became a triple knockout event for the first time. In 2025, the Tier 1 event, as well as the U25 event, returned to the pool format, with each team playing the three other teams in their pool. The Tier 1 event also includes a cross over game.

Starting in 2026, the qualification process was different with the Tier 1 and 2 events being disbanded, and there only being one men's and women's event with 16 teams each. 12 open invites being sent out, with the four remaining spots chosen through the newly created GSOC Satellite Event series. The winners of four select tour events received the final invitations to the Invitational. In the event that the winning team was already qualified, the next highest finishing team at the event was invited until the spot was filled.

== Past champions ==
=== Men ===
==== Tier 1 ====
Starting in 2026, there was only one event which became the official GSOC championship

Year	Winning team	Runner-up team	Location	Purse
2015	(Alberta) Kevin Koe, Marc Kennedy, Brent Laing, Ben Hebert	(Newfoundland and Labrador) Brad Gushue, Mark Nichols, Brett Gallant, Geoff Walker	Paradise, Newfoundland and Labrador	$100,000
2016	(Sweden) Niklas Edin, Oskar Eriksson, Rasmus Wranå, Christoffer Sundgren	(Scotland) Kyle Smith, Thomas Muirhead, Kyle Waddell, Cammy Smith	Cranbrook, British Columbia	$100,000
2017	(Newfoundland and Labrador) Brad Gushue, Mark Nichols, Brett Gallant, Geoff Walker	(Norway) Steffen Walstad, Markus Høiberg, Magnus Nedregotten, Magnus Vågberg	Regina, Saskatchewan	$100,000
2018	(Ontario) Brad Jacobs, Ryan Fry, E. J. Harnden, Ryan Harnden	(Alberta) Brendan Bottcher, Darren Moulding, Bradley Thiessen, Karrick Martin	Thunder Bay, Ontario	$100,000
2019	(Ontario) Brad Jacobs, Marc Kennedy, E. J. Harnden, Ryan Harnden	(Newfoundland and Labrador) Brad Gushue, Mark Nichols, Brett Gallant, Geoff Walker	Westville Road, Nova Scotia	$120,000
2020	Cancelled			
2021	Cancelled			
2022	(Sweden) Niklas Edin, Oskar Eriksson, Rasmus Wranå, Christoffer Sundgren	(Manitoba) Matt Dunstone, B. J. Neufeld, Colton Lott, Ryan Harnden	Grande Prairie, Alberta	$120,000
2023	(Italy) Joël Retornaz, Amos Mosaner, Sebastiano Arman, Mattia Giovanella	(Alberta) Brendan Bottcher, Marc Kennedy, Brett Gallant, Ben Hebert	Niagara Falls, Ontario	$175,000
2024	(Scotland) Bruce Mouat, Grant Hardie, Bobby Lammie, Hammy McMillan Jr.	(Newfoundland and Labrador) Brad Gushue, Mark Nichols, E. J. Harnden, Geoff Walker	Charlottetown, Prince Edward Island	$175,000
2025	(Scotland) Bruce Mouat, Grant Hardie, Bobby Lammie, Hammy McMillan Jr.	(Manitoba) Matt Dunstone, Colton Lott, E. J. Harnden, Ryan Harnden	Nisku, Alberta	$175,000
2026	(Switzerland) Benoît Schwarz-van Berkel, Yannick Schwaller (skip), Sven Michel, Pablo Lachat-Couchepin	(Norway) Magnus Ramsfjell, Steffen Walstad, Bendik Ramsfjell, Mathias Brænden	Victoria, British Columbia	$200,000

==== Tier 2 ====
Year	Winning team	Runner-up team	Purse
2015	(British Columbia) Jim Cotter, Ryan Kuhn, Tyrel Griffith, Rick Sawatsky	(Ontario) Mark Kean, Bowie Abbis-Mills, Spencer Nuttall, Fraser Reid	$50,000
2016	(Ontario) Greg Balsdon, Jonathan Beuk, David Staples, Scott Chadwick	(Ontario) Glenn Howard, Richard Hart, David Mathers, Scott Howard	$50,000
2017	(Manitoba) Jason Gunnlaugson, Alex Forrest, Ian McMillan, Connor Njegovan	(Manitoba) William Lyburn, Richard Daneault, Jared Kolomaya, Braden Zawada	$50,000
2018	(Saskatchewan) Kirk Muyres, Kevin Marsh, Dan Marsh, Dallan Muyres	(Ontario) Scott McDonald, Jonathan Beuk, Don Bowser, Scott Chadwick	$50,000
2019	(United States) Korey Dropkin, Joe Polo, Mark Fenner, Thomas Howell	(Manitoba) Tanner Horgan, Colton Lott, Kyle Doering, Tanner Lott	$50,000
2020	Cancelled		
2021	Cancelled		
2022	(United States) Korey Dropkin, Andrew Stopera, Mark Fenner, Thomas Howell	(Alberta) Aaron Sluchinski, Jeremy Harty, Kerr Drummond, Dylan Webster	$50,000
2023	(United States) Daniel Casper, Luc Violette, Ben Richardson, Chase Sinnett	(Japan) Yusuke Morozumi, Yuta Matsumura, Ryotaro Shukuya, Masaki Iwai, Kosuke Morozumi	$60,000
2024	(Saskatchewan) Rylan Kleiter, Joshua Mattern, Matthew Hall, Trevor Johnson	(Norway) Magnus Ramsfjell, Martin Sesaker, Bendik Ramsfjell, Gaute Nepstad	$60,000

==== U25 ====
Year	Winning team	Runner-up team	Purse
2025	(Japan) Takumi Maeda, Hiroki Maeda, Uryu Kamikawa, Gakuto Tokoro	(Ontario) Jordan McNamara, Colton Daly, Jacob Clarke, Brenden Laframboise	$60,000

=== Women ===
==== Tier 1 ====
Starting in 2026, there was only one event which became the official GSOC championship

Year	Winning team	Runner-up team	Location	Purse
2015	(Switzerland) Silvana Tirinzoni, Manuela Siegrist, Esther Neuenschwander, Marlene Albrecht	(Ontario) Rachel Homan, Emma Miskew, Joanne Courtney, Lisa Weagle	Paradise, Newfoundland and Labrador	$100,000
2016	(Alberta) Val Sweeting, Lori Olson-Johns, Dana Ferguson, Rachelle Brown	(Manitoba) Michelle Englot, Kate Cameron, Leslie Wilson-Westcott, Raunora Westcott	Cranbrook, British Columbia	$100,000
2017	(Alberta) Val Sweeting, Lori Olson-Johns, Dana Ferguson, Rachelle Brown	(Sweden) Anna Hasselborg, Sara McManus, Agnes Knochenhauer, Sofia Mabergs	Regina, Saskatchewan	$100,000
2018	(Ontario) Rachel Homan, Emma Miskew, Joanne Courtney, Lisa Weagle	(Manitoba) Tracy Fleury, Selena Njegovan, Liz Fyfe, Kristin MacCuish	Thunder Bay, Ontario	$100,000
2019	(Sweden) Anna Hasselborg, Sara McManus, Agnes Knochenhauer, Sofia Mabergs	(Manitoba) Kerri Einarson, Val Sweeting, Shannon Birchard, Briane Meilleur	Westville Road, Nova Scotia	$120,000
2020	Cancelled			
2021	Cancelled			
2022	(Ontario) Rachel Homan, Tracy Fleury (skip), Emma Miskew, Sarah Wilkes	(Manitoba) Kerri Einarson, Val Sweeting, Shannon Birchard, Briane Harris	Grande Prairie, Alberta	$120,000
2023	(Manitoba) Jennifer Jones, Karlee Burgess, Emily Zacharias, Lauren Lenentine	(Manitoba) Kaitlyn Lawes, Selena Njegovan, Jocelyn Peterman, Kristin MacCuish	Niagara Falls, Ontario	$175,000
2024	(Manitoba) Kerri Einarson, Val Sweeting, Dawn McEwen, Krysten Karwacki	(Ontario) Rachel Homan, Tracy Fleury, Emma Miskew, Sarah Wilkes	Charlottetown, Prince Edward Island	$175,000
2025	(Ontario) Rachel Homan, Tracy Fleury, Emma Miskew, Sarah Wilkes, Rachelle Brown	(Switzerland) Alina Pätz, Silvana Tirinzoni (Skip), Carole Howald, Selina Witschonke	Nisku, Alberta	$175,000
2026	(Manitoba) Kerri Einarson, Shannon Birchard, Karlee Burgess, Jocelyn Peterman	(South Korea) Kim Kyeong-ae, Kim Min-seo, Shim Yu-jeong, Kim Ji-soo	Victoria, British Columbia	$200,000

==== Tier 2 ====
Year	Winning team	Runner-up team	Purse
2015	(Manitoba) Kerri Einarson, Selena Kaatz, Liz Fyfe, Kristin MacCuish	(Saskatchewan) Amber Holland, Cindy Ricci, Larisa Murray, Debbie Lozinski	$50,000
2016	(Ontario) Jacqueline Harrison, Janet Murphy, Stephanie Matheson, Melissa Foster	(Ontario) Krista McCarville, Kendra Lilly, Ashley Sippala, Sarah Potts	$50,000
2017	(Manitoba) Kerri Einarson, Selena Kaatz, Liz Fyfe, Kristin MacCuish	(Alberta) Chelsea Carey, Cathy Overton-Clapham, Jocelyn Peterman, Laine Peters	$50,000
2018	(Switzerland) Briar Hürlimann, Elena Stern (skip), Lisa Gisler, Céline Koller	(Japan) Sayaka Yoshimura, Kaho Onodera, Anna Ohmiya, Yumie Funayama	$50,000
2019	(South Korea) Kim Min-ji, Ha Seung-youn, Kim Hye-rin, Kim Su-jin, Yang Tae-i	(Ontario) Jestyn Murphy, Carly Howard, Stephanie Matheson, Grace Holyoke	$50,000
2020	Cancelled		
2021	Cancelled		
2022	(British Columbia) Clancy Grandy, Kayla MacMillan, Lindsay Dubue, Sarah Loken	(Alberta) Jessie Hunkin, Kristen Streifel, Becca Hebert, Dayna Demers	$50,000
2023	(South Korea) Kim Eun-jung, Kim Kyeong-ae, Kim Cho-hi, Kim Seon-yeong, Kim Yeong-mi	(Denmark) Madeleine Dupont, Mathilde Halse, Jasmin Lander, My Larsen, Denise Dupont	$60,000
2024	(Nova Scotia) Christina Black, Jill Brothers, Marlee Powers, Karlee Everist	(Japan) Sayaka Yoshimura, Yuna Kotani, Kaho Onodera, Anna Ohmiya, Mina Kobayashi	$60,000

==== U25 ====
Year	Winning team	Runner-up team	Purse
2025	(Alberta) Serena Gray-Withers, Catherine Clifford, Lindsey Burgess, Zoe Cinnamon	(Japan) Yuina Miura, Kohane Tsuruga, Rin Suzuki, Hana Ikeda	$60,000
