= 2016 GSOC Tour Challenge =

Grand Slam of Curling event

- Host city: Cranbrook, British Columbia
- Arena: Western Financial Place & Cranbrook Memorial Arena
- Dates: November 8–13
- Men's winner: (Sweden) Team Edin
- Curling club: Karlstads Curlingklubb, Karlstad
- Skip: Niklas Edin
- Third: Oskar Eriksson
- Second: Rasmus Wranå
- Lead: Christoffer Sundgren
- Finalist: (Scotland) Kyle Smith
- Women's winner: (Alberta) Team Sweeting
- Curling club: Saville Community SC, Edmonton
- Skip: Val Sweeting
- Third: Lori Olson-Johns
- Second: Dana Ferguson
- Lead: Rachelle Brown
- Finalist: (Manitoba) Michelle Englot

The 2016 GSOC Tour Challenge was held from November 8 to 13 at the Western Financial Place and the Cranbrook Memorial Arena in Cranbrook, British Columbia. This was the second Grand Slam of the 2016–17 curling season.

The men's tier 1 final was the first ever men's Grand Slam final to feature two non-Canadian teams, as Sweden's Niklas Edin rink defeated Scotland's Kyle Smith team. Val Sweeting defeated Michelle Englot in the women's tier 1 final to win her second grand slam event.

The tier 2 winners Greg Balsdon and Jacqueline Harrison qualified for the 2017 Meridian Canadian Open later in the season.

== Men ==
=== Tier 1 ===
==== Teams ====
Skip	Third	Second	Lead	Locale
Brendan Bottcher	Pat Simmons	Bradley Thiessen	Karrick Martin	Edmonton, Alberta
Reid Carruthers	Braeden Moskowy	Derek Samagalski	Colin Hodgson	Winnipeg, Manitoba
Niklas Edin	Oskar Eriksson	Rasmus Wranå	Christoffer Sundgren	Karlstad, Sweden
John Epping	Mathew Camm	Patrick Janssen	Tim March	Toronto, Ontario
Brad Jacobs	Ryan Fry	E. J. Harnden	Ryan Harnden	Sault Ste. Marie, Ontario
Kevin Koe	Marc Kennedy	Brent Laing	Ben Hebert	Calgary, Alberta
Steve Laycock	Kirk Muyres	Colton Flasch	Dallan Muyres	Saskatoon, Saskatchewan
Mike McEwen	B. J. Neufeld	Matt Wozniak	Denni Neufeld	Winnipeg, Manitoba
Jim Cotter (Fourth)	John Morris (Skip)	Tyrel Griffith	Rick Sawatsky	Vernon, British Columbia
David Murdoch	Greg Drummond	Scott Andrews	Michael Goodfellow	Stirling, Scotland
Mark Nichols	Adam Spencer	Brett Gallant	Geoff Walker	St. John's, Newfoundland and Labrador
John Shuster	Tyler George	Matt Hamilton	John Landsteiner	(United States) Duluth, Minnesota
Kyle Smith	Thomas Muirhead	Kyle Waddell	Cammy Smith	Stirling, Scotland
Charley Thomas	Nathan Connolly	Brandon Klassen	Craig Savill	Edmonton, Alberta
Thomas Ulsrud	Torger Nergård	Christoffer Svae	Håvard Vad Petersson	Oslo, Norway

==== Round-robin standings ====
Final round-robin standings

Key
Teams to Playoffs
Teams to Tiebreakers

Pool A	W	L	PF	PA
(Newfoundland and Labrador) Mark Nichols	3	1	30	18
(Scotland) Kyle Smith	3	1	24	21
(Manitoba) Reid Carruthers	2	2	19	21
(Ontario) John Epping	1	3	17	25
(Alberta) Charley Thomas	1	3	22	27

Pool B	W	L	PF	PA
(British Columbia) John Morris	4	0	31	14
(Norway) Thomas Ulsrud	2	2	21	22
(Ontario) Brad Jacobs	2	2	22	21
(Alberta) Kevin Koe	1	3	19	30
(Scotland) David Murdoch	1	3	23	29

Pool C	W	L	PF	PA
(Manitoba) Mike McEwen	3	1	23	17
(Saskatchewan) Steve Laycock	2	2	23	26
(Sweden) Niklas Edin	2	2	19	24
(United States) John Shuster	2	2	23	19
(Alberta) Brendan Bottcher	1	3	18	20

=== Round-robin results ===
==== Draw 1 ====
Tuesday, November 8, 7:00 pm

Sheet D	1	2	3	4	5	6	7	8	Final
(Manitoba) Reid Carruthers 🔨	0	3	0	0	2	0	0	2	7
(Alberta) Charley Thomas	1	0	3	1	0	1	0	0	6

Sheet E	1	2	3	4	5	6	7	8	Final
(Alberta) Kevin Koe 🔨	0	0	2	1	0	1	0	X	4
(British Columbia) John Morris	1	2	0	0	2	0	3	X	8

==== Draw 2 ====
Wednesday, November 9, 8:30 am

Sheet C	1	2	3	4	5	6	7	8	Final
(Saskatchewan) Steve Laycock 🔨	1	0	2	1	0	2	0	3	9
(Sweden) Niklas Edin	0	1	0	0	3	0	2	0	6

Sheet D	1	2	3	4	5	6	7	8	Final
(Scotland) David Murdoch	0	1	0	1	0	2	0	X	4
(Norway) Thomas Ulsrud 🔨	1	0	2	0	2	0	3	X	8

==== Draw 3 ====
Wednesday, November 9, 1:00 pm

Sheet A	1	2	3	4	5	6	7	8	Final
(Newfoundland and Labrador) Mark Nichols 🔨	1	0	3	0	5	0	X	X	9
(Scotland) Kyle Smith	0	1	0	2	0	1	X	X	4

Sheet B	1	2	3	4	5	6	7	8	Final
(Alberta) Brendan Bottcher	0	2	0	0	0	1	0	2	5
(United States) John Shuster 🔨	1	0	2	0	2	0	1	0	6

==== Draw 4 ====
Wednesday, November 9, 4:30 pm

Sheet A	1	2	3	4	5	6	7	8	Final
(Ontario) Brad Jacobs	0	0	1	2	0	0	2	0	5
(British Columbia) John Morris 🔨	2	1	0	0	2	0	0	1	6

Sheet B	1	2	3	4	5	6	7	8	Final
(Manitoba) Mike McEwen 🔨	0	0	2	0	1	0	3	X	6
(Sweden) Niklas Edin	0	0	0	1	0	1	0	X	2

Sheet C	1	2	3	4	5	6	7	8	Final
(Ontario) John Epping	1	0	0	0	1	0	X	X	2
(Manitoba) Reid Carruthers 🔨	0	3	1	1	0	3	X	X	8

==== Draw 5 ====
Wednesday, November 9, 8:00 pm

Sheet A	1	2	3	4	5	6	7	8	Final
(Newfoundland and Labrador) Mark Nichols	1	0	1	0	5	1	X	X	8
(Alberta) Charley Thomas 🔨	0	2	0	2	0	0	X	X	4

Sheet B	1	2	3	4	5	6	7	8	Final
(Saskatchewan) Steve Laycock 🔨	0	0	2	1	0	1	0	2	6
(United States) John Shuster	1	1	0	0	1	0	2	0	5

Sheet C	1	2	3	4	5	6	7	8	9	Final
(Alberta) Kevin Koe 🔨	1	0	0	2	0	1	1	0	1	6
(Norway) Thomas Ulsrud	0	0	2	0	2	0	0	1	0	5

==== Draw 6 ====
Thursday, November 10, 8:30 am

Sheet B	1	2	3	4	5	6	7	8	Final
(Scotland) Kyle Smith	0	2	0	2	0	2	X	X	6
(Manitoba) Reid Carruthers 🔨	0	0	0	0	1	0	X	X	1

==== Draw 7 ====
Thursday, November 10, 1:00 pm

Sheet A	1	2	3	4	5	6	7	8	Final
(Ontario) Brad Jacobs 🔨	1	0	1	0	5	0	0	1	8
(Scotland) David Murdoch	0	1	0	1	0	2	1	0	5

Sheet B	1	2	3	4	5	6	7	8	Final
(Manitoba) Mike McEwen 🔨	3	0	0	2	0	0	1	X	6
(Alberta) Brendan Bottcher	0	1	1	0	1	0	0	X	3

Sheet C	1	2	3	4	5	6	7	8	Final
(Ontario) John Epping 🔨	0	1	0	2	0	0	1	0	4
(Alberta) Charley Thomas	0	0	1	0	0	1	0	3	5

==== Draw 8 ====
Thursday, November 10, 4:30 pm

Sheet B	1	2	3	4	5	6	7	8	Final
(British Columbia) John Morris 🔨	1	4	1	0	0	3	X	X	9
(Norway) Thomas Ulsrud	0	0	0	1	1	0	X	X	2

Sheet D	1	2	3	4	5	6	7	8	9	Final
(Sweden) Niklas Edin	0	0	1	0	3	0	1	0	1	6
(United States) John Shuster 🔨	1	1	0	1	0	1	0	1	0	5

==== Draw 9 ====
Thursday, November, 8:00 pm

Sheet C	1	2	3	4	5	6	7	8	Final
(Alberta) Kevin Koe 🔨	0	1	0	3	0	1	0	0	5
(Scotland) David Murdoch	1	0	1	0	2	0	2	5	11

Sheet D	1	2	3	4	5	6	7	8	9	Final
(Newfoundland and Labrador) Mark Nichols	1	0	1	0	2	0	1	1	0	6
(Ontario) John Epping 🔨	0	2	0	1	0	3	0	0	1	7

Sheet E	1	2	3	4	5	6	7	8	Final
(Manitoba) Mike McEwen 🔨	0	2	0	1	0	1	5	X	9
(Saskatchewan) Steve Laycock	1	0	1	0	1	0	0	X	5

==== Draw 10 ====
Friday, November 11, 8:30 am

Sheet B	1	2	3	4	5	6	7	8	Final
(Alberta) Charley Thomas 🔨	2	2	0	0	1	0	2	0	7
(Scotland) Kyle Smith	0	0	2	3	0	1	0	2	8

==== Draw 11 ====
Friday, November 11, 1:00 pm

Sheet B	1	2	3	4	5	6	7	8	Final
(Newfoundland and Labrador) Mark Nichols 🔨	3	1	0	1	1	0	1	X	7
(Manitoba) Reid Carruthers	0	0	2	0	0	1	0	X	3

Sheet D	1	2	3	4	5	6	7	8	Final
(Saskatchewan) Steve Laycock	0	0	1	0	2	0	0	X	3
(Alberta) Brendan Bottcher 🔨	1	1	0	2	0	0	2	X	6

Sheet E	1	2	3	4	5	6	7	8	Final
(Ontario) Brad Jacobs	2	0	0	0	1	0	0	X	3
(Norway) Thomas Ulsrud 🔨	0	1	1	1	0	1	2	X	6

==== Draw 12 ====
Friday, November 11, 4:30 pm

Sheet B	1	2	3	4	5	6	7	8	Final
(Manitoba) Mike McEwen	0	1	0	1	0	X	X	X	2
(United States) John Shuster 🔨	2	0	1	0	4	X	X	X	7

Sheet D	1	2	3	4	5	6	7	8	Final
(British Columbia) John Morris	0	1	2	0	3	2	X	X	8
(Scotland) David Murdoch 🔨	1	0	0	2	0	0	X	X	3

==== Draw 13 ====
Friday, November 11, 8:00 pm

Sheet B	1	2	3	4	5	6	7	8	Final
(Ontario) John Epping	0	0	0	1	0	2	1	X	4
(Scotland) Kyle Smith 🔨	2	1	1	0	2	0	0	X	6

Sheet C	1	2	3	4	5	6	7	8	Final
(Alberta) Kevin Koe 🔨	2	0	0	1	0	1	0	X	4
(Ontario) Brad Jacobs	0	2	0	0	2	0	2	X	6

Sheet D	1	2	3	4	5	6	7	8	Final
(Alberta) Brendan Bottcher	0	0	1	1	1	0	0	1	4
(Sweden) Niklas Edin 🔨	2	0	0	0	0	2	1	0	5

=== Tiebreakers ===
Saturday, November 12, 8:00 am

Sheet B	1	2	3	4	5	6	7	8	Final
(Ontario) Brad Jacobs 🔨	0	0	1	0	0	0	2	0	3
(Sweden) Niklas Edin	0	1	0	0	0	3	0	2	6

Player percentages
(Ontario) Team Jacobs		(Sweden) Team Edin	
Ryan Harnden	91%	Christoffer Sundgren	83%
E.J. Harnden	78%	Rasmus Wranå	81%
Ryan Fry	85%	Oskar Eriksson	91%
Brad Jacobs	83%	Niklas Edin	95%
Total	84%	Total	87%

Sheet C	1	2	3	4	5	6	7	8	Final
(United States) John Shuster	0	0	1	0	0	0	X	X	1
(Norway) Thomas Ulsrud 🔨	0	2	0	2	1	1	X	X	6

Player percentages
(United States) Team Shuster		(Norway) Team Ulsrud	
John Landsteiner	89%	Håvard Vad Petersson	91%
Matt Hamilton	78%	Christoffer Svae	62%
Tyler George	82%	Torger Nergård	77%
John Shuster	69%	Thomas Ulsrud	89%
Total	79%	Total	80%

==== Playoffs ====
Quarterfinals
1	(British Columbia) John Morris	1
8	(Sweden) Niklas Edin	9
4	(Newfoundland and Labrador) Mark Nichols	9
5	(Saskatchewan) Steve Laycock	3
2	(Manitoba) Mike McEwen	3
7	(Norway) Thomas Ulsrud	6
3	(Scotland) Kyle Smith	7
6	(Manitoba) Reid Carruthers	5

Semifinals
8	(Sweden) Niklas Edin	6
4	(Newfoundland and Labrador) Mark Nichols	4
7	(Norway) Thomas Ulsrud	5
3	(Scotland) Kyle Smith	6

Final
8	(Sweden) Niklas Edin	7
3	(Scotland) Kyle Smith	3

===== Quarterfinals =====
Saturday November 12, 4:00pm

Sheet A	1	2	3	4	5	6	7	8	Final
(British Columbia) John Morris 🔨	1	0	0	0	0	0	X	X	1
(Sweden) Niklas Edin	0	0	0	3	0	6	X	X	9

Player percentages
(British Columbia) Team Morris		(Sweden) Team Edin	
Rick Sawatsky	87%	Christoffer Sundgren	81%
Tyrel Griffith	71%	Rasmus Wranå	93%
John Morris	90%	Oskar Eriksson	88%
Jim Cotter	73%	Niklas Edin	94%
Total	80%	Total	89%

Sheet B	1	2	3	4	5	6	7	8	Final
(Newfoundland and Labrador) Mark Nichols 🔨	2	0	0	1	0	2	4	X	9
(Saskatchewan) Steve Laycock	0	1	1	0	1	0	0	X	3

Player percentages
(Newfoundland and Labrador) Team Nichols		(Saskatchewan) Team Laycock	
Geoff Walker	89%	Dallan Muyres	70%
Brett Gallant	80%	Colton Flasch	80%
Adam Spencer	76%	Kirk Muyres	78%
Mark Nichols	78%	Steve Laycock	64%
Total	81%	Total	73%

Sheet C	1	2	3	4	5	6	7	8	Final
(Manitoba) Mike McEwen 🔨	0	1	0	0	0	2	0	X	3
(Norway) Thomas Ulsrud	1	0	0	3	1	0	1	X	6

Player percentages
(Manitoba) Team McEwen		(Norway) Team Ulsrud	
Denni Neufeld	89%	Håvard Vad Petersson	74%
Matt Wozniak	76%	Christoffer Svae	66%
B.J. Neufeld	80%	Torger Nergård	88%
Mike McEwen	62%	Thomas Ulsrud	91%
Total	77%	Total	80%

Sheet D	1	2	3	4	5	6	7	8	Final
(Scotland) Kyle Smith 🔨	1	0	3	0	1	2	0	0	7
(Manitoba) Reid Carruthers	0	2	0	1	0	0	1	1	5

Player percentages
(Scotland) Team Smith		(Manitoba) Team Carruthers	
Cammy Smith	81%	Colin Hodgson	94%
Kyle Waddell	97%	Derek Samagalski	73%
Thomas Muirhead	83%	Braeden Moskowy	83%
Kyle Smith	84%	Reid Carruthers	83%
Total	86%	Total	83%

===== Semifinals =====
Saturday November 12, 8:00pm

Sheet A	1	2	3	4	5	6	7	8	Final
(Sweden) Niklas Edin	0	0	0	0	2	1	0	3	6
(Newfoundland and Labrador) Mark Nichols 🔨	0	2	0	1	0	0	1	0	4

Player percentages
(Sweden) Team Edin		(Newfoundland and Labrador) Team Nichols	
Christoffer Sundgren	84%	Geoff Walker	82%
Rasmus Wranå	78%	Brett Gallant	83%
Oskar Eriksson	74%	Adam Spencer	71%
Niklas Edin	78%	Mark Nichols	86%
Total	78%	Total	80%

Sheet D	1	2	3	4	5	6	7	8	9	Final
(Norway) Thomas Ulsrud	0	0	0	2	0	2	0	1	0	5
(Scotland) Kyle Smith 🔨	2	0	1	0	1	0	1	0	1	6

Player percentages
(Norway) Team Ulsrud		(Scotland) Team Smith	
Håvard Vad Petersson	92%	Cammy Smith	76%
Christoffer Svae	79%	Kyle Waddell	86%
Torger Nergård	96%	Thomas Muirhead	66%
Thomas Ulsrud	82%	Kyle Smith	97%
Total	87%	Total	81%

===== Final =====
Sunday November 13, 1:30pm

Sheet C	1	2	3	4	5	6	7	8	Final
(Sweden) Niklas Edin	0	2	1	0	3	0	1	X	7
(Scotland) Kyle Smith 🔨	1	0	0	1	0	1	0	X	3

Player percentages
(Sweden) Team Edin		(Scotland) Team Smith	
Christoffer Sundgren	94%	Cammy Smith	85%
Rasmus Wranå	72%	Kyle Waddell	67%
Oskar Eriksson	86%	Thomas Muirhead	51%
Niklas Edin	95%	Kyle Smith	81%
Total	87%	Total	71%

=== Tier 2 ===
==== Round-robin standings ====
Final round-robin standings

Key
Teams to Playoffs
Teams to Tiebreakers

Pool A	W	L
(Ontario) Glenn Howard	4	0
(United States) Craig Brown	3	1
(British Columbia) Tyler Tardi	2	2
(Quebec) Jean-Michel Ménard	1	3
(British Columbia) Andrew Bilesky	0	4

Pool B	W	L
(British Columbia) Dean Joanisse	3	1
(Scotland) Tom Brewster	3	1
(Ontario) Mark Bice	2	2
(British Columbia) Stephen Schneider	1	3
(Manitoba) William Lyburn	1	3

Pool C	W	L
(Ontario) Greg Balsdon	4	0
(United States) Brady Clark	2	2
(Scotland) Bruce Mouat	2	2
(British Columbia) Sean Geall	1	3
(Manitoba) Jason Gunnlaugson	1	3

==== Tiebreakers ====
- (Ontario) Mark Bice 7–4 (Scotland) Bruce Mouat

==== Playoffs ====
Quarterfinals
1	(Ontario) Greg Balsdon	5
8	(Ontario) Mark Bice	4
4	(Scotland) Tom Brewster	2
5	(British Columbia) Dean Joanisse	5
2	(Ontario) Glenn Howard	4
7	(United States) Brady Clark	3
3	(United States) Craig Brown	5
6	(British Columbia) Tyler Tardi	4

Semifinals
1	(Ontario) Greg Balsdon	4
5	(British Columbia) Dean Joanisse	2
2	(Ontario) Glenn Howard	5
3	(United States) Craig Brown	2

Final
1	(Ontario) Greg Balsdon	5
2	(Ontario) Glenn Howard	4

== Women ==
=== Tier 1 ===
==== Teams ====
Skip	Third	Second	Lead	Locale
Chelsea Carey	Amy Nixon	Jocelyn Peterman	Laine Peters	Calgary, Alberta
Kerri Einarson	Selena Kaatz	Liz Fyfe	Kristin MacCuish	Winnipeg, Manitoba
Michelle Englot	Kate Cameron	Leslie Wilson-Westcott	Raunora Westcott	Winnipeg, Manitoba
Allison Flaxey	Clancy Grandy	Lynn Kreviazuk	Morgan Court	Caledon, Ontario
Tracy Fleury	Crystal Webster	Jennifer Wylie	Amanda Gates	Sudbury, Ontario
Anna Hasselborg	Sara McManus	Agnes Knochenhauer	Sofia Mabergs	Sundbyberg, Sweden
Rachel Homan	Emma Miskew	Joanne Courtney	Lisa Weagle	Ottawa, Ontario
Jennifer Jones	Kaitlyn Lawes	Jill Officer	Dawn McEwen	Winnipeg, Manitoba
Sherry Middaugh	Jo-Ann Rizzo	Lee Merklinger	Leigh Armstrong	Coldwater, Ontario
Ayumi Ogasawara	Yumie Funayama	Kaho Onodera	Anna Ohmiya	Sapporo, Japan
Alina Pätz	Nadine Lehmann	Marisa Winkelhausen	Nicole Schwägli	Zürich, Switzerland
Kelsey Rocque	Laura Crocker	Taylor McDonald	Jennifer Gates	Edmonton, Alberta
Cissi Östlund (Fourth)	Christina Bertrup	Maria Wennerström	Margaretha Sigfridsson (Skip)	Skellefteå, Sweden
Val Sweeting	Lori Olson-Johns	Dana Ferguson	Rachelle Brown	Edmonton, Alberta
Silvana Tirinzoni	Manuela Siegrist	Esther Neuenschwander	Marlene Albrecht	Zürich, Switzerland

==== Round-robin standings ====
Final round-robin standings

Key
Teams to Playoffs
Teams to Tiebreakers

Pool A	W	L	PF	PA
(Ontario) Rachel Homan	4	0	30	12
(Ontario) Tracy Fleury	2	2	20	22
(Japan) Ayumi Ogasawara	2	2	18	19
(Alberta) Kelsey Rocque	2	2	24	21
(Manitoba) Kerri Einarson	0	4	15	33

Pool B	W	L	PF	PA
(Alberta) Val Sweeting	3	1	26	18
(Manitoba) Jennifer Jones	3	1	24	21
(Sweden) Anna Hasselborg	2	2	25	24
(Switzerland) Alina Pätz	1	3	17	22
(Ontario) Sherry Middaugh	1	3	15	22

Pool C	W	L	PF	PA
(Ontario) Allison Flaxey	4	0	30	20
(Manitoba) Michelle Englot	2	2	22	23
(Alberta) Chelsea Carey	2	2	21	23
(Switzerland) Silvana Tirinzoni	2	2	21	21
(Sweden) Margaretha Sigfridsson	0	4	22	29

=== Round-robin results ===
==== Draw 1 ====
Tuesday, November 8, 7:00 pm

Sheet A	1	2	3	4	5	6	7	8	Final
(Alberta) Val Sweeting	1	0	2	1	0	1	0	0	5
(Ontario) Sherry Middaugh 🔨	0	2	0	0	2	0	1	2	7

Sheet B	1	2	3	4	5	6	7	8	Final
(Alberta) Kelsey Rocque 🔨	3	0	0	2	3	0	X	X	8
(Japan) Ayumi Ogasawara	0	0	1	0	0	1	X	X	2

Sheet E	1	2	3	4	5	6	7	8	Final
(Alberta) Chelsea Carey 🔨	1	0	0	1	0	1	0	X	3
(Ontario) Allison Flaxey	0	3	2	0	0	0	4	X	9

==== Draw 2 ====
Wednesday, November 9, 8:30 am

Sheet A	1	2	3	4	5	6	7	8	Final
(Ontario) Tracy Fleury 🔨	1	0	2	1	0	1	1	1	7
(Manitoba) Kerri Einarson	0	2	0	0	1	0	0	0	3

Sheet B	1	2	3	4	5	6	7	8	Final
(Manitoba) Michelle Englot	0	0	2	4	0	2	0	0	8
(Sweden) Margaretha Sigfridsson 🔨	0	1	0	0	4	0	1	1	7

==== Draw 3 ====
Wednesday, November 9, 1:00 pm

Sheet A	1	2	3	4	5	6	7	8	Final
(Manitoba) Jennifer Jones 🔨	0	2	0	2	0	1	0	X	5
(Ontario) Sherry Middaugh	0	0	1	0	1	0	1	X	3

Sheet B	1	2	3	4	5	6	7	8	9	Final
(Switzerland) Silvana Tirinzoni 🔨	1	0	1	0	2	0	1	2	0	7
(Ontario) Allison Flaxey	0	3	0	3	0	1	0	0	1	8

Sheet E	1	2	3	4	5	6	7	8	Final
(Switzerland) Alina Pätz 🔨	1	0	0	2	0	0	2	0	5
(Sweden) Anna Hasselborg	0	0	1	0	3	0	0	3	7

==== Draw 4 ====
Wednesday, November 9, 4:30 pm

Sheet C	1	2	3	4	5	6	7	8	Final
(Alberta) Kelsey Rocque	0	0	2	0	2	0	0	X	4
(Ontario) Tracy Fleury 🔨	1	1	0	1	0	2	2	X	7

Sheet D	1	2	3	4	5	6	7	8	Final
(Ontario) Rachel Homan 🔨	0	0	3	1	0	1	1	X	6
(Japan) Ayumi Ogasawara	0	1	0	0	2	0	0	X	3

==== Draw 5 ====
Wednesday, November 9, 8:00 pm

Sheet B	1	2	3	4	5	6	7	8	Final
(Alberta) Chelsea Carey 🔨	0	0	2	0	1	1	0	1	5
(Manitoba) Michelle Englot	1	1	0	3	0	0	2	0	7

Sheet C	1	2	3	4	5	6	7	8	Final
(Alberta) Val Sweeting	0	1	1	0	3	2	2	X	9
(Sweden) Anna Hasselborg 🔨	1	0	0	2	0	0	0	X	3

==== Draw 6 ====
Thursday, November 10, 8:30 am

Sheet B	1	2	3	4	5	6	7	8	9	Final
(Manitoba) Jennifer Jones	1	1	0	1	1	0	0	0	1	5
(Switzerland) Alina Pätz 🔨	0	0	2	0	0	0	1	1	0	4

Sheet A	1	2	3	4	5	6	7	8	Final
(Ontario) Rachel Homan	2	2	2	0	0	1	X	X	7
(Alberta) Kelsey Rocque 🔨	0	0	0	1	0	0	X	X	1

==== Draw 7 ====
Thursday, November 10, 1:00 pm

Sheet A	1	2	3	4	5	6	7	8	Final
(Switzerland) Silvana Tirinzoni	1	0	0	0	0	1	0	X	2
(Alberta) Chelsea Carey 🔨	0	1	1	1	2	0	1	X	6

Sheet B	1	2	3	4	5	6	7	8	Final
(Japan) Ayumi Ogasawara	0	0	2	2	0	4	X	X	8
(Manitoba) Kerri Einarson 🔨	0	1	0	0	1	0	X	X	2

==== Draw 8 ====
Thursday, November 10, 4:30 pm

Sheet B	1	2	3	4	5	6	7	8	9	Final
(Sweden) Margaretha Sigfridsson	0	1	0	2	2	2	0	0	0	7
(Ontario) Allison Flaxey 🔨	2	0	3	0	0	0	1	1	2	9

Sheet C	1	2	3	4	5	6	7	8	Final
(Ontario) Sherry Middaugh	0	0	1	0	0	0	0	X	1
(Sweden) Anna Hasselborg 🔨	0	1	0	2	0	1	3	X	7

Sheet D	1	2	3	4	5	6	7	8	Final
(Ontario) Rachel Homan 🔨	1	1	0	2	0	4	2	X	10
(Ontario) Tracy Fleury	0	0	1	0	2	0	0	X	3

==== Draw 9 ====
Thursday, November 10, 8:00 pm

Sheet C	1	2	3	4	5	6	7	8	Final
(Switzerland) Silvana Tirinzoni	2	0	0	4	0	0	0	1	7
(Manitoba) Michelle Englot 🔨	0	1	0	0	0	2	1	0	4

Sheet E	1	2	3	4	5	6	7	8	9	Final
(Manitoba) Jennifer Jones 🔨	2	0	1	0	0	0	0	2	0	5
(Alberta) Val Sweeting	0	1	0	1	1	1	1	0	1	6

==== Draw 10 ====
Friday, November 11, 8:30 am

Sheet B	1	2	3	4	5	6	7	8	Final
(Alberta) Chelsea Carey	3	0	1	1	1	1	0	0	7
(Sweden) Margaretha Sigfridsson 🔨	0	2	0	0	0	0	2	1	5

Sheet C	1	2	3	4	5	6	7	8	Final
(Ontario) Rachel Homan	1	0	2	0	0	3	0	1	7
(Manitoba) Kerri Einarson 🔨	0	3	0	1	0	0	1	0	5

Sheet D	1	2	3	4	5	6	7	8	Final
(Ontario) Tracy Fleury 🔨	0	1	0	0	1	0	1	0	3
(Japan) Ayumi Ogasawara	2	0	0	1	0	1	0	1	5

Sheet C	1	2	3	4	5	6	7	8	Final
(Ontario) Sherry Middaugh	1	2	0	0	0	1	0	0	4
(Switzerland) Alina Pätz 🔨	0	0	3	0	0	0	1	1	5

==== Draw 11 ====
Friday, November 11, 1:00 pm

Sheet A	1	2	3	4	5	6	7	8	Final
(Ontario) Allison Flaxey 🔨	1	0	0	0	2	1	0	0	4
(Manitoba) Michelle Englot	0	2	0	0	0	0	1	0	3

Sheet E	1	2	3	4	5	6	7	8	9	Final
(Manitoba) Jennifer Jones 🔨	1	0	3	0	1	0	3	0	1	9
(Sweden) Anna Hasselborg	0	2	0	3	0	1	0	2	0	8

==== Draw 12 ====
Friday, November 11, 4:30 pm

Sheet B	1	2	3	4	5	6	7	8	Final
(Switzerland) Alina Pätz	0	1	0	0	1	1	0	0	3
(Alberta) Val Sweeting 🔨	1	0	0	2	0	0	1	2	6

Sheet C	1	2	3	4	5	6	7	8	Final
(Alberta) Kelsey Rocque	3	0	3	0	1	0	4	X	11
(Manitoba) Kerri Einarson 🔨	0	2	0	2	0	1	0	X	5

Sheet D	1	2	3	4	5	6	7	8	Final
(Switzerland) Silvana Tirinzoni 🔨	0	1	0	1	1	1	0	1	5
(Sweden) Margaretha Sigfridsson	1	0	1	0	0	0	1	0	3

=== Tiebreakers ===
Friday, November 11, 8:00 pm

Sheet A	1	2	3	4	5	6	7	8	Final
(Sweden) Anna Hasselborg	1	0	0	0	2	0	0	3	6
(Japan) Ayumi Ogasawara 🔨	0	1	0	0	0	0	1	0	2

Player percentages
(Sweden) Team Hasselborg		(Japan) Team Ogasawara	
Sofia Mabergs	41%	Anna Ohmiya	65%
Agnes Knochenhauer	74%	Kaho Onodera	49%
Sara McManus	83%	Yumie Funayama	44%
Anna Hasselborg	88%	Ayumi Ogasawara	74%
Total	71%	Total	58%

Sheet D	1	2	3	4	5	6	7	8	Final
(Manitoba) Michelle Englot 🔨	0	1	1	3	0	1	1	X	7
(Alberta) Chelsea Carey	1	0	0	0	1	0	0	X	2

Player percentages
(Manitoba) Team Englot		(Alberta) Team Carey	
Raunora Westcott	93%	Laine Peters	84%
Leslie Wilson-Westcott	81%	Jocelyn Peterman	83%
Kate Cameron	64%	Amy Nixon	65%
Michelle Englot	77%	Chelsea Carey	60%
Total	79%	Total	73%

Saturday, November 12, 8:00 am

Sheet E	1	2	3	4	5	6	7	8	Final
(Switzerland) Silvana Tirinzoni 🔨	0	0	0	1	0	0	0	X	1
(Alberta) Kelsey Rocque	0	1	2	0	1	1	2	X	7

Player percentages
(Switzerland) Team Tirinzoni		(Alberta) Team Rocque	
Marlene Albrecht	91%	Jen Gates	75%
Esther Neuenschwander	85%	Taylor McDonald	82%
Manuela Siegrist	61%	Laura Crocker	54%
Silvana Tirinzoni	55%	Kelsey Rocque	84%
Total	73%	Total	74%

==== Playoffs ====
Quarterfinals
1	(Ontario) Allison Flaxey	5
8	(Alberta) Kelsey Rocque	3
4	(Alberta) Val Sweeting	7
5	(Ontario) Tracy Fleury	5
2	(Ontario) Rachel Homan	5
7	(Manitoba) Michelle Englot	7
3	(Manitoba) Jennifer Jones	5
6	(Sweden) Anna Hasselborg	7

Semifinals
1	(Ontario) Allison Flaxey	2
4	(Alberta) Val Sweeting	9
7	(Manitoba) Michelle Englot	6
6	(Sweden) Anna Hasselborg	5

Final
4	(Alberta) Val Sweeting	8
7	(Manitoba) Michelle Englot	4

===== Quarterfinals =====
Saturday November 12, 12:00 pm

Team	1	2	3	4	5	6	7	8	Final
(Ontario) Allison Flaxey 🔨	0	1	0	0	0	3	1	0	5
(Alberta) Kelsey Rocque	0	0	0	1	1	0	0	1	3

Player percentages
(Ontario) Team Flaxey		(Alberta) Team Rocque	
Morgan Court	92%	Jen Gates	84%
Lynn Kreviazuk	72%	Taylor McDonald	73%
Clancy Grandy	73%	Laura Crocker	76%
Allison Flaxey	75%	Kelsey Rocque	71%
Total	78%	Total	76%

Team	1	2	3	4	5	6	7	8	Final
(Alberta) Val Sweeting 🔨	1	0	1	0	2	0	1	2	7
(Ontario) Tracy Fleury	0	1	0	1	0	3	0	0	5

Player percentages
(Alberta) Team Sweeting		(Ontario) Team Fleury	
Rachelle Brown	67%	Amanda Gates	74%
Dana Ferguson	52%	Jennifer Wylie	64%
Lori Olson-Johns	77%	Crystal Webster	65%
Val Sweeting	71%	Tracy Fleury	72%
Total	67%	Total	69%

Team	1	2	3	4	5	6	7	8	Final
(Ontario) Rachel Homan 🔨	2	0	1	0	0	2	0	0	5
(Manitoba) Michelle Englot	0	3	0	0	1	0	2	1	7

Player percentages
(Ontario) Team Homan		(Manitoba) Team Englot	
Lisa Weagle	83%	Raunora Westcott	79%
Joanne Courtney	83%	Leslie Wilson-Westcott	81%
Emma Miskew	72%	Kate Cameron	76%
Rachel Homan	84%	Michelle Englot	73%
Total	80%	Total	77%

Team	1	2	3	4	5	6	7	8	Final
(Manitoba) Jennifer Jones 🔨	2	0	0	0	2	0	1	0	5
(Sweden) Anna Hasselborg	0	1	1	1	0	1	0	3	7

Player percentages
(Manitoba) Team Jones		(Sweden) Team Hasselborg	
Dawn McEwen	80%	Sofia Mabergs	79%
Jill Officer	83%	Agnes Knochenhauer	86%
Kaitlyn Lawes	74%	Sara McManus	91%
Jennifer Jones	65%	Anna Hasselborg	87%
Total	76%	Total	86%

===== Semifinals =====
Saturday November 12, 8:00pm

Team	1	2	3	4	5	6	7	8	Final
(Ontario) Allison Flaxey 🔨	0	0	0	0	2	0	X	X	2
(Alberta) Val Sweeting	2	1	4	1	0	1	X	X	9

Player percentages
(Ontario) Team Flaxey		(Alberta) Team Sweeting	
Morgan Court	70%	Rachelle Brown	67%
Lynn Kreviazuk	68%	Dana Ferguson	90%
Clancy Grandy	71%	Lori Olson-Johns	62%
Allison Flaxey	36%	Val Sweeting	83%
Total	61%	Total	76%

Team	1	2	3	4	5	6	7	8	9	Final
(Manitoba) Michelle Englot	0	0	2	0	3	0	0	0	1	6
(Sweden) Anna Hasselborg 🔨	0	1	0	1	0	2	0	1	0	5

Player percentages
(Manitoba) Team Englot		(Sweden) Team Hasselborg	
Raunora Westcott	82%	Sofia Mabergs	81%
Leslie Wilson-Westcott	72%	Agnes Knochenhauer	85%
Kate Cameron	75%	Sara McManus	79%
Michelle Englot	76%	Anna Hasselborg	84%
Total	76%	Total	82%

===== Final =====
Sunday November 13, 10:00am

Team	1	2	3	4	5	6	7	8	Final
(Alberta) Val Sweeting 🔨	0	1	1	1	2	0	3	X	8
(Manitoba) Michelle Englot	2	0	0	0	0	2	0	X	4

Player percentages
(Alberta) Team Sweeting		(Manitoba) Team Englot	
Rachelle Brown	68%	Raunora Westcott	74%
Dana Ferguson	67%	Leslie Wilson-Westcott	69%
Lori Olson-Johns	93%	Kate Cameron	75%
Val Sweeting	73%	Michelle Englot	70%
Total	75%	Total	72%

=== Tier 2 ===
==== Round-robin standings ====
Final round-robin standings

Key
Teams to Playoffs
Teams to Tiebreakers

Pool A	W	L
(Ontario) Krista McCarville	4	0
(British Columbia) Karla Thompson	2	2
(British Columbia) Diane Gushulak	2	2
(United States) Cory Christensen	2	2
(Saskatchewan) Stefanie Lawton	0	4

Pool B	W	L
(United States) Nina Roth	4	0
(Alberta) Casey Scheidegger	2	2
(Ontario) Jacqueline Harrison	2	2
(British Columbia) Marla Mallett	1	3
(British Columbia) Corryn Brown	1	3

Pool C	W	L
(Manitoba) Joelle Brown	4	0
(Alberta) Shannon Kleibrink	3	1
(Scotland) Hannah Fleming	2	2
(Northwest Territories) Kerry Galusha	1	3
(Ontario) Julie Tippin	0	4

==== Tiebreakers ====
- (Ontario) Jacqueline Harrison 6–4 (Scotland) Hannah Fleming
- (United States) Cory Christensen 2–5 (British Columbia) Diane Gushulak

==== Playoffs ====
Quarterfinals
1	(Ontario) Krista McCarville	8
8	(British Columbia) Diane Gushulak	6
4	(Alberta) Shannon Kleibrink	6
5	(Alberta) Casey Scheidegger	5
2	(United States) Nina Roth	3
7	(Ontario) Jacqueline Harrison	6
3	(Manitoba) Joelle Brown	7
6	(British Columbia) Karla Thompson	8

Semifinals
1	(Ontario) Krista McCarville	7
4	(Alberta) Shannon Kleibrink	5
7	(Ontario) Jacqueline Harrison	6
6	(British Columbia) Karla Thompson	5

Final
1	(Ontario) Krista McCarville	4
7	(Ontario) Jacqueline Harrison	5
