= 2017 GSOC Tour Challenge =

Grand Slam of Curling event

- Host city: Regina, Saskatchewan
- Arena: The Co-operators Centre, Evraz Place
- Dates: September 5–10
- Men's winner: (Newfoundland and Labrador) Team Gushue
- Curling club: Bally Haly G&CC, St. John's, NL
- Skip: Brad Gushue
- Third: Mark Nichols
- Second: Brett Gallant
- Lead: Geoff Walker
- Finalist: (Norway) Steffen Walstad
- Women's winner: (Alberta) Team Sweeting
- Curling club: Saville Community SC, Edmonton, AB
- Skip: Val Sweeting
- Third: Lori Olson-Johns
- Second: Dana Ferguson
- Lead: Rachelle Brown
- Finalist: (Sweden) Anna Hasselborg

The 2017 GSOC Tour Challenge was held from September 5 to 10 at the Co-operators Centre at Evraz Place in Regina, Saskatchewan. This was the first Grand Slam of the 2017–18 curling season.

There were two tiers in each of the men's and women's events.

The winning tier 1 teams get a direct bye into the 2018 Humpty's Champions Cup, the last grand slam event of the season. The winning tier 2 teams get a bye into the 2017 Masters, the next grand slam event of the season.

On the men's side, the defending World Champion Brad Gushue rink from St. John's, Newfoundland defeated the defending Norwegian champion Steffen Walstad rink in the final. It would be Gushue's 8th career grand slam win. Team Gushue went undefeated in the tournament and took home $20,000 for the win.

On the women's side, the defending Tour Challenge champion Val Sweeting from Edmonton, Alberta rink made it two in a row when they defeated the Swedish Anna Hasselborg rink in the final, also taking home $20,000. It was Sweeting's third career Slam title.

== Men ==
=== Tier 1 ===
==== Teams ====
Skip	Third	Second	Lead	Locale
Reid Carruthers	Braeden Moskowy	Derek Samagalski	Colin Hodgson	Winnipeg, Manitoba
Benoît Schwarz	Claudio Pätz	Peter de Cruz (skip)	Valentin Tanner	Geneva, Switzerland
Niklas Edin	Oskar Eriksson	Rasmus Wranå	Christoffer Sundgren	Karlstad, Sweden
John Epping	Mat Camm	Pat Janssen	Tim March	Toronto, Ontario
Brad Gushue	Mark Nichols	Brett Gallant	Geoff Walker	St. John's, Newfoundland and Labrador
Glenn Howard	Glen Muirhead (Note: Muirhead replaced Richard Hart.)	David Mathers	Scott Howard	Penetanguishene, Ontario
Brad Jacobs	Ryan Fry	E. J. Harnden	Ryan Harnden	Sault Ste. Marie, Ontario
Kevin Koe	Marc Kennedy	Brent Laing	Ben Hebert	Calgary, Alberta
Steve Laycock	Kirk Muyres	Matt Dunstone	Dallan Muyres	Saskatoon, Saskatchewan
Heath McCormick	Christopher Plys	Korey Dropkin	Thomas Howell	(United States) Blaine, Minnesota
Jim Cotter	John Morris (skip)	Catlin Schneider (Note: Schneider replaced Rick Sawatsky, who was injured.)	Tyrel Griffith	Vernon, British Columbia
John Shuster	Tyler George	Matt Hamilton	John Landsteiner	(United States) Duluth, Minnesota
Pat Simmons	Colton Lott	Kyle Doering	Rob Gordon	Winnipeg, Manitoba
Kyle Smith	Thomas Muirhead	Kyle Waddell	Cammy Smith	Stirling, Scotland
Steffen Walstad	Markus Høiberg	Magnus Nedregotten	Magnus Vågberg	Oppdal, Norway

==== Round-robin standings ====
Key
Teams to Playoffs

Pool A	W	L	PF	PA
(Newfoundland and Labrador) Brad Gushue	4	0	22	6
(United States) John Shuster	3	1	22	21
(Ontario) Glenn Howard	1	3	10	21
(Alberta) Kevin Koe	1	3	14	14
(Switzerland) Peter de Cruz	1	3	12	17

Pool B	W	L	PF	PA
(Ontario) John Epping	4	0	30	18
(Manitoba) Pat Simmons	3	1	30	18
(Sweden) Niklas Edin	2	2	26	22
(United States) Heath McCormick	1	3	15	27
(Scotland) Kyle Smith	0	4	15	31

Pool C	W	L	PF	PA
(Norway) Steffen Walstad	4	0	23	15
(Ontario) Brad Jacobs	3	1	29	21
(Saskatchewan) Steve Laycock	2	2	23	27
(Manitoba) Reid Carruthers	1	3	24	28
(British Columbia) John Morris	0	4	16	23

==== Playoffs ====
Quarterfinals
1	(Newfoundland and Labrador) Brad Gushue	7
8	(Saskatchewan) Steve Laycock	5
4	(Ontario) Brad Jacobs	10
5	(United States) John Shuster	8
2	(Ontario) John Epping	4
7	(Sweden) Niklas Edin	5
3	(Norway) Steffen Walstad	11
6	(Manitoba) Pat Simmons	4

Semifinals
1	(Newfoundland and Labrador) Brad Gushue	5
4	(Ontario) Brad Jacobs	2
7	(Sweden) Niklas Edin	5
3	(Norway) Steffen Walstad	6

Final
1	(Newfoundland and Labrador) Brad Gushue	9
3	(Norway) Steffen Walstad	1

===== Quarterfinals =====
Saturday, Sept 9, 3:30pm

Team	1	2	3	4	5	6	7	8	9	Final
(Newfoundland and Labrador) Brad Gushue 🔨	0	0	0	2	0	1	0	2	2	7
(Saskatchewan) Steve Laycock	0	2	1	0	1	0	1	0	0	5

Team	1	2	3	4	5	6	7	8	9	Final
(Ontario) Brad Jacobs 🔨	5	0	1	1	0	0	1	0	2	10
(United States) John Shuster	0	2	0	0	1	3	0	2	0	8

Team	1	2	3	4	5	6	7	8	Final
(Ontario) John Epping	0	0	0	0	2	1	1	0	4
(Sweden) Niklas Edin 🔨	0	2	1	1	0	0	0	1	5

Team	1	2	3	4	5	6	7	8	Final
(Norway) Steffen Walstad 🔨	1	0	0	2	0	3	5	X	11
(Manitoba) Pat Simmons	0	2	1	0	1	0	0	X	4

===== Semifinals =====
Saturday, Sept 9, 8:00pm

Team	1	2	3	4	5	6	7	8	Final
(Newfoundland and Labrador) Brad Gushue 🔨	0	0	1	0	3	0	0	1	5
(Ontario) Brad Jacobs	0	0	0	1	0	0	1	0	2

Team	1	2	3	4	5	6	7	8	Final
(Sweden) Niklas Edin	0	1	0	1	0	2	0	1	5
(Norway) Steffen Walstad 🔨	1	0	3	0	2	0	0	0	6

===== Final =====
Sunday, Sept 10, 10:30am

Sheet C	1	2	3	4	5	6	7	8	Final
(Newfoundland and Labrador) Brad Gushue 🔨	2	3	0	0	3	1	X	X	9
(Norway) Steffen Walstad	0	0	0	1	0	0	X	X	1

Player percentages
(Newfoundland and Labrador) Team Gushue		(Norway) Team Walstad	
Geoff Walker	88%	Magnus Vågberg	86%
Brett Gallant	92%	Magnus Nedregotten	84%
Mark Nichols	99%	Markus Hoiberg	51%
Brad Gushue	97%	Steffen Walstad	72%
Total	94%	Total	73%

=== Tier 2 ===
==== Round-robin standings ====
Key
Teams to Playoffs

Pool A	W	L
(United States) Craig Brown	3	1
(Manitoba) William Lyburn	3	1
(Manitoba) Jason Gunnlaugson	3	1
(Scotland) Greg Drummond	1	3
(Saskatchewan) Jason Jacobson	0	4

Pool B	W	L
(Saskatchewan) Carl deConinck Smith	3	1
(China) Liu Rui	3	1
(Ontario) Greg Balsdon	3	1
(Saskatchewan) Colton Flasch	1	3
(Ontario) Dayna Deruelle	0	4

Pool C	W	L
(Alberta) Brendan Bottcher	4	0
(Saskatchewan) Josh Heidt	3	1
(Alberta) Charley Thomas	2	2
(Saskatchewan) Adam Casey	1	3
(Saskatchewan) Jason Ackerman	0	4

==== Playoffs ====
Quarterfinals
1	(Alberta) Brendan Bottcher	8
8	(Ontario) Greg Balsdon	4
4	(Manitoba) William Lyburn	5
5	(China) Liu Rui	4
2	(United States) Craig Brown	3
7	(Saskatchewan) Carl deConinck Smith	5
3	(Manitoba) Jason Gunnlaugson	6
6	(Saskatchewan) Josh Heidt	5

Semifinals
1	(Alberta) Brendan Bottcher	6
4	(Manitoba) William Lyburn	7
7	(Saskatchewan) Carl deConinck Smith	6
3	(Manitoba) Jason Gunnlaugson	7

Final
4	(Manitoba) William Lyburn	7
3	(Manitoba) Jason Gunnlaugson	8

== Women ==
=== Tier 1 ===
==== Teams ====
Skip	Third	Second	Lead	Locale
Michelle Englot	Kate Cameron	Leslie Wilson-Westcott	Raunora Westcott	Winnipeg, Manitoba
Allison Flaxey	Clancy Grandy	Lynn Kreviazuk	Morgan Court	Caledon, Ontario
Tracy Fleury	Crystal Webster	Jenna Walsh	Amanda Gates	Sudbury, Ontario
Jacqueline Harrison	Janet Murphy	Stephanie Matheson	Nicole Westlund Stewart	Mississauga, Ontario
Anna Hasselborg	Sara McManus	Agnes Knochenhauer	Sofia Mabergs	Sundbyberg, Sweden
Rachel Homan	Emma Miskew	Joanne Courtney	Lisa Weagle	Ottawa, Ontario
Jennifer Jones	Kaitlyn Lawes	Jill Officer	Dawn McEwen	Winnipeg, Manitoba
Sherry Middaugh	Jo-Ann Rizzo	Lee Merklinger	Leigh Armstrong	Coldwater, Ontario
Eve Muirhead	Anna Sloan	Vicki Adams	Lauren Gray	Stirling, Scotland
Alina Pätz	Nadine Lehmann	Marisa Winkelhausen	Nicole Schwägli	Zürich, Switzerland
Casey Scheidegger	Cary-Anne McTaggart	Jessie Scheidegger	Kristie Moore	Lethbridge, Alberta
Val Sweeting	Lori Olson-Johns	Dana Ferguson	Rachelle Brown	Edmonton, Alberta
Julie Tippin	Chantal Duhaime	Rachelle Vink	Tess Bobbie	Woodstock, Ontario
Silvana Tirinzoni	Manuela Siegrist	Esther Neuenschwander	Marlene Albrecht	Zürich, Switzerland
Wang Bingyu	Zhou Yan	Liu Jinli	Ma Jingyi	Harbin, China

==== Round-robin standings ====
Key
Teams to Playoffs
Teams to Tiebreakers

Pool A	W	L	PF	PA
(Alberta) Val Sweeting	4	0	23	18
(Ontario) Jacqueline Harrison	2	2	17	18
(Scotland) Eve Muirhead	2	2	15	17
(China) Wang Bingyu	1	3	20	21
(Ontario) Rachel Homan	1	3	18	19

Pool B	W	L	PF	PA
(Switzerland) Alina Pätz	4	0	29	13
(Manitoba) Jennifer Jones	3	1	18	15
(Ontario) Allison Flaxey	1	3	4	14
(Alberta) Casey Scheidegger	1	3	17	15
(Ontario) Sherry Middaugh	1	3	11	16

Pool C	W	L	PF	PA
(Switzerland) Silvana Tirinzoni	3	1	19	10
(Sweden) Anna Hasselborg	3	1	23	22
(Manitoba) Michelle Englot	2	2	23	20
(Ontario) Julie Tippin	2	2	20	21
(Ontario) Tracy Fleury	0	4	12	27

==== Tiebreaker ====
Team	1	2	3	4	5	6	7	8	Final
(Ontario) Julie Tippin	0	1	1	1	0	0	1	0	4
(Scotland) Eve Muirhead 🔨	2	0	0	0	0	2	0	1	5

==== Playoffs ====
Quarterfinals
1	(Switzerland) Alina Pätz	3
8	(Scotland) Eve Muirhead	5
4	(Switzerland) Silvana Tirinzoni	4
5	(Sweden) Anna Hasselborg	8
2	(Alberta) Val Sweeting	8
7	(Manitoba) Michelle Englot	5
3	(Manitoba) Jennifer Jones	7
6	(Ontario) Jacqueline Harrison	6

Semifinals
8	(Scotland) Eve Muirhead	5
5	(Sweden) Anna Hasselborg	6
2	(Alberta) Val Sweeting	6
3	(Manitoba) Jennifer Jones	5

Final
5	(Sweden) Anna Hasselborg	5
2	(Alberta) Val Sweeting	6

===== Quarterfinals =====
Saturday, Sept 9, 11:30am

Sheet B	1	2	3	4	5	6	7	8	Final
(Manitoba) Jennifer Jones 🔨	3	1	2	0	1	0	0	1	8
(Ontario) Jacqueline Harrison	0	0	0	1	0	2	2	0	5

Sheet C	1	2	3	4	5	6	7	8	Final
(Switzerland) Silvana Tirinzoni 🔨	1	0	1	0	1	1	0	X	4
(Sweden) Anna Hasselborg	0	2	0	2	0	0	3	X	7

Sheet D	1	2	3	4	5	6	7	8	Final
(Alberta) Val Sweeting 🔨	2	0	0	0	3	0	3	X	8
(Manitoba) Michelle Englot	0	0	1	2	0	2	0	X	5

Sheet E	1	2	3	4	5	6	7	8	Final
(Switzerland) Alina Pätz 🔨	2	0	0	0	0	0	1	0	3
(Scotland) Eve Muirhead	0	0	2	0	0	2	0	1	5

===== Semifinals =====
Saturday, Sept. 9, 8:00pm

Team	1	2	3	4	5	6	7	8	Final
(Scotland) Eve Muirhead	0	1	0	1	0	0	1	2	5
(Sweden) Anna Hasselborg 🔨	2	0	1	0	1	2	0	0	6

Team	1	2	3	4	5	6	7	8	Final
(Alberta) Val Sweeting 🔨	1	0	2	0	0	3	0	0	6
(Manitoba) Jennifer Jones	0	1	0	0	1	0	2	1	5

===== Final =====
Sunday, Sept 10, 2:30pm

Sheet C	1	2	3	4	5	6	7	8	Final
(Sweden) Anna Hasselborg	3	0	1	0	1	0	0	0	5
(Alberta) Val Sweeting 🔨	0	1	0	1	0	3	0	1	6

Player percentages
(Sweden) Team Hasselborg		(Alberta) Team Sweeting	
Sofia Mabergs	83%	Rachelle Brown	90%
Agnes Knochenhauer	81%	Dana Ferguson	75%
Sara McManus	97%	Lori Olson-Johns	62%
Anna Hasselborg	69%	Val Sweeting	71%
Total	83%	Total	74%

=== Tier 2 ===
==== Round-robin standings ====
Key
Teams to Playoffs
Teams to Tiebreakers

Pool A	W	L
(Manitoba) Kerri Einarson	3	1
(South Korea) Kim Eun-jung	2	2
(Saskatchewan) Nancy Martin	2	2
(Alberta) Nadine Scotland	2	2
(United States) Nina Roth	1	3

Pool B	W	L
(Alberta) Chelsea Carey	3	1
(United States) Jamie Sinclair	3	1
(Saskatchewan) Stefanie Lawton	2	2
(Alberta) Kelsey Rocque	2	2
(Saskatchewan) Amber Holland (Note: Holland replaced Penny Barker.)	0	4

Pool C	W	L
(Russia) Anna Sidorova	3	1
(Switzerland) Binia Feltscher	3	1
(Scotland) Hannah Fleming	2	2
(Saskatchewan) Robyn Silvernagle	2	2
(Saskatchewan) Chantelle Eberle	0	4

==== Tiebreakers ====
- (Saskatchewan) Silvernagle 5-4 Martin (Saskatchewan)
- (South Korea) Kim 5-6 Rocque (Alberta)
- (Scotland) Fleming 5-6 Lawton (Saskatchewan)
- (Alberta) Scotland 5-7 Silvernagle (Saskatchewan)

==== Playoffs ====
Quarterfinals
1	(Manitoba) Kerri Einarson	6
8	(Saskatchewan) Robyn Silvernagle	4
4	(Russia) Anna Sidorova	5
5	(Switzerland) Binia Feltscher	8
2	(Alberta) Chelsea Carey	8
7	(Alberta) Kelsey Rocque	5
3	(United States) Jamie Sinclair	5
6	(Saskatchewan) Stefanie Lawton	4

Semifinals
1	(Manitoba) Kerri Einarson	9
5	(Switzerland) Binia Feltscher	1
2	(Alberta) Chelsea Carey	11
3	(United States) Jamie Sinclair	3

Final
1	(Manitoba) Kerri Einarson	7
2	(Alberta) Chelsea Carey	4
