= Rachelle Brown =

Canadian curler (born 1986)

- Curler
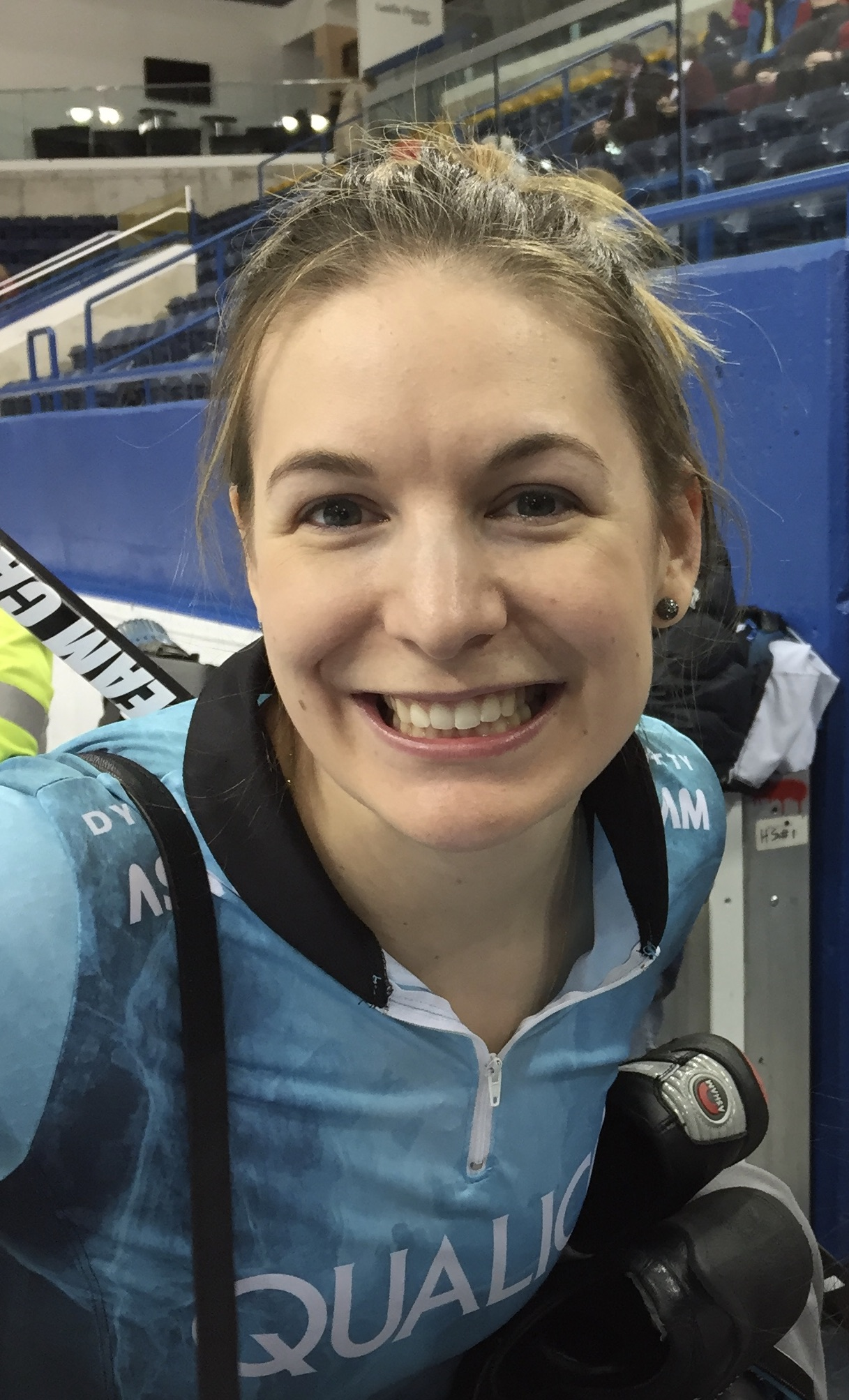
- Brown in April 2019
- Born: Rachel Pidherny; July 9, 1986 (age 40); Smithers, British Columbia

Team
- Curling club: Saville Community SC, Edmonton, AB
- Skip: Rachel Homan
- Third: Tracy Fleury
- Second: Emma Miskew
- Lead: Sarah Wilkes
- Alternate: Rachelle Brown

Curling career
- Member Association: Alberta (2011–2024); Ontario (2024–Present)
- Hearts: 7 (2014, 2015, 2019, 2020, 2021, 2024, 2025)
- World Championship: 3 (2019, 2024, 2025)
- Pan Continental Championship: 3 (2022, 2024, 2025)
- Olympic: 1 (2026)
- Top CTRS ranking: 2nd (2014–15)
- Grand Slam victories: 4 (2014 Masters, 2016 Tour Challenge, 2017 Tour Challenge, 2023 Champions Cup)
Medal record
Women's curling
Representing Canada
Olympic Games
Bronze medal – third place	2026 Milano Cortina	Team
World Curling Championships
Gold medal – first place	2024 Sydney
Gold medal – first place	2025 Uijeongbu
Pan Continental Curling Championships
Gold medal – first place	2024 Lacombe
Silver medal – second place	2025 Virginia
Bronze medal – third place	2022 Calgary
Scotties Tournament of Hearts
Gold medal – first place	2025 Thunder Bay
Representing Ontario
Canadian Olympic Curling Trials
Gold medal – first place	2025 Halifax
Scotties Tournament of Hearts
Gold medal – first place	2024 Calgary
Representing Alberta
Scotties Tournament of Hearts
Gold medal – first place	2019 Sydney
Silver medal – second place	2014 Montreal
Silver medal – second place	2015 Moose Jaw
Bronze medal – third place	2021 Calgary

Rachel "Rachelle" Brown (born July 9, 1986 as Rachel Pidherny) is a Canadian curler from Edmonton, Alberta. She is currently the alternate on Team Rachel Homan. With team Homan, she won the bronze medal at 2026 Winter Olympics.

== Career ==
Born in Smithers, British Columbia, Brown moved to Edmonton c. 2006. As a university curler, she represented the University of Alberta at four CIS/CCA Curling Championships. Brown first represented her new province at the 2009 Canadian Mixed Curling Championship, playing lead for Team Alberta, skipped by Tom Appelman. The team had a less than successful tournament, going 3–8, but Brown had the best percentage among leads in the tournament, and was named to the First All-Star team.

Brown played for a number of skips before joining the Sweeting rink in 2011. She played with Joanne Delanoy from 2008 to 2009, Diane Foster and Casey Scheidegger from 2009 to 2010 and for Bobbie Sauder and Dana Ferguson from 2010 to 2011. Brown played in her first provincial championships in 2011 with Ferguson, finishing fourth. With Team Sweeting, they had a 3–4 record, failing to qualify for the playoffs at the 2013 Canadian Olympic Curling Trials. Also in the 2013–14 season, the rink had two quarterfinal appearances at Grand Slams, at the 2013 Curlers Corner Autumn Gold Curling Classic and the 2013 Colonial Square Ladies Classic. They continued their success that season by going undefeated at the 2014 Alberta Scotties Tournament of Hearts, where her team beat Cheryl Bernard in the final. Team Sweeting then represented Alberta at the national championships, the 2014 Scotties Tournament of Hearts. At the Hearts, Ferguson and her Alberta team had a 8–3 record following the round robin. This put them into the playoffs where she had to beat Saskatchewan's Stefanie Lawton and Manitoba's Chelsea Carey to get to the final. They did this successfully, but lost to Ontario's Rachel Homan 8–6 to win the silver medal.

After the 2013–14 season, third Joanne Courtney left the team to play for the Homan rink, the same team they had lost to in the 2014 Scotties final. She would be replaced by Andrea Crawford, who left the team early in the season when things weren't working out. With Cathy Overton-Clapham playing third as their spare, they won their first slam at the 2014 Masters of Curling. With Lori Olson-Johns as their new full-time third, they also made it to the semifinals at two slams and the quarterfinals at one other. They also won the 2014 Canada Cup of Curling, seeking their revenge over Homan in the final. The team would win the 2015 Alberta Scotties Tournament of Hearts, earning the team a berth at the 2015 Scotties Tournament of Hearts. There, Sweeting led the rink to a 9–2 round robin record, good enough for second place, behind Team Manitoba, skipped by Jennifer Jones. They would go on to lose to Manitoba in the 1 vs. 2 game, but rebounded in the semifinal, beating Saskatchewan (skipped by Stefanie Lawton), before losing to Jones again in the final.

The team found less success in their next season. They won just one tour event (the 2015 HDF Insurance Shoot-Out), though they still made the playoff in 5 of the 6 slams of the season, including making it to the finals of the 2015 Masters, where they lost to Homan. The team would not represent Alberta at the Scotties, as they would lose in the finals of the 2016 Alberta Scotties Tournament of Hearts to the Chelsea Carey rink, who would end up winning the national title.

In the 2016–17 season, the Sweeting rink would again make the playoffs in five of the six slams, including winning the 2016 Tour Challenge and losing in the final of the 2017 Players' Championship. The team again lost in the finals of the 2017 Alberta Scotties Tournament of Hearts, this time losing to Shannon Kleibrink. The next season, Team Sweeting defended their title by winning the 2017 Tour Challenge. Team Sweeting played in the 2017 Canadian Olympic Curling Trials, going 4–4, just missing the playoffs. The Sweeting team then turned their attention to the 2018 Alberta Scotties Tournament of Hearts, where she lost in the 3 vs. 4 game. In addition to winning the Tour Challenge, the Sweeting team would make the playoffs in one more slam that season, the 2017 Boost National. The team announced they would be splitting up after the season ended.

After the season, Brown stayed with Dana Ferguson and the duo joined the Carey team at front end including Chelsea Carey and Sarah Wilkes, playing out of The Glencoe Club in Calgary. Leading up to Alberta provincials, the team had two playoff appearances at Grand Slam of Curling events including a semifinal finish at the Masters. Team Carey qualified for the 2019 Alberta Scotties Tournament of Hearts as the CTRS leaders from the tour season. They qualified for the playoffs as the "A Qualifier" after defeating Casey Scheidegger's rink 7–2. They defeated the Kelsey Rocque rink in the A vs. B playoff game 10–2 and would go on to beat them in the final 8–3 after Carey made a double for four in the ninth end. Representing Alberta at the 2019 Scotties Tournament of Hearts, they went 7–0 through the round robin and finished the championship pool with a 9–2 record which made them the number one seed going into the playoffs. Alberta defeated Saskatchewan's Robyn Silvernagle rink in the 1 vs. 2 game 11–7 and would face Ontario's Rachel Homan rink in the final. Team Carey made history when they came back from a 1–5 deficit to win the championship 8–6 with a total of five stolen points and two missed draws by Homan in the 10th and 11th ends. At the 2019 World Women's Curling Championship, the team struggled and were the first Canadian women's team not to make the playoffs at the championship in twenty years. They finished the season with a quarterfinal finish at the 2019 Players' Championship and by missing the playoffs at the 2019 Champions Cup.

Team Carey did not have a strong start to the Grand Slam season, only making the playoffs at one of the first four events, the National. They had a strong week at the 2019 Canada Cup going 4–2 through the round robin, qualifying for the playoffs. In the semifinal, they lost to the Tracy Fleury rink 9–4. At the 2020 Scotties Tournament of Hearts, Team Carey led Team Canada to a 5–6 record, missing the playoffs and settling for seventh place. It would be the team's last event of the season as both the Players' Championship and the Champions Cup Grand Slam events were cancelled due to the COVID-19 pandemic. On March 13, 2020, Wilkes announced she would be parting ways with the team. Three days later, both Ferguson and Brown announced they would be leaving and the team officially disbanded. On March 21, Kelsey Rocque and Danielle Schmiemann announced they would be adding Ferguson and Brown to their team for the 2020–21 season.

Due to the pandemic, most of the tour events during the 2020–21 season were cancelled. Team Rocque played only one competitive game together during the entire season at the Okotoks Ladies Classic in November. After the first draw, the event was cancelled due to a province-wide shutdown in Alberta. Due to the COVID-19 pandemic in Alberta, the 2021 provincial championship was also cancelled. As the reigning provincials champions, Team Laura Walker were chosen to represent Alberta at the 2021 Scotties Tournament of Hearts. However, due to many provinces cancelling their provincial championships as a result of the COVID-19 pandemic in Canada, Curling Canada added three Wild Card teams to the national championship, which were based on the CTRS standings from the 2019–20 season. Team Rocque was one of the top three non-qualified teams, but they did not retain at least three of their four players from the previous season, meaning they could not qualify for the national championship. Walker's regular lead Nadine Scotland, who was three-months pregnant, opted not to play in the tournament, which was being held in a "bubble" due to the pandemic, so Brown and teammate Dana Ferguson were invited to join the Walker rink at lead and alternate respectively. At the Scotties, the team finished with a 9–3 round robin record, tied for third with Manitoba, skipped by Jennifer Jones. Alberta beat Manitoba in the tiebreaker, but lost in the semifinal against the defending champion Team Canada rink, skipped by Kerri Einarson, settling for the bronze medal.

In their first event of the 2021–22 season, Team Rocque reached the quarterfinals of the 2021 Alberta Curling Series: Saville Shoot-Out. Due to the pandemic, the qualification process for the 2021 Canadian Olympic Curling Trials had to be modified to qualify enough teams for the championship. In these modifications, Curling Canada created the 2021 Canadian Curling Trials Direct-Entry Event, an event where five teams would compete to try to earn one of three spots into the 2021 Canadian Olympic Curling Trials. Team Rocque qualified for the Trials Direct-Entry Event due to their CTRS ranking from the 2019–20 season. At the event, the team went 3–1 through the round robin, enough to secure their spot at the Olympic Trials. Next, Team Rocque played in both the 2021 Masters and the 2021 National Grand Slam events. After failing to reach the playoffs at the Masters, the team made it all the way to the semifinals of the National where they were defeated by Tracy Fleury. A few weeks later, they competed in the Olympic Trials, held November 20 to 28 in Saskatoon, Saskatchewan. At the event, the team began by losing five of their first six games. They then won their final two games, which included a victory over Kerri Einarson, to finish in seventh place with a 3–5 record. Team Rocque then competed in the 2022 Alberta Scotties Tournament of Hearts, where they posted a 6–1 record through the round robin. This created a three-way tie between Rocque, Laura Walker and the Casey Scheidegger rink, however, as Walker had to best draw shot challenge between the three rinks, they advanced directly to the final. In the semifinal, Team Rocque fell 10–7 to Team Scheidegger, eliminating them from contention. On March 21, 2022, the team announced that they would be staying together despite the Olympic quadrennial coming to an end.

Team Rocque began the 2022–23 season at the 2022 Saville Shoot-Out where they missed the playoffs with a 3–2 record. The team next played in the 2022 PointsBet Invitational. They defeated Christina Black in the first round before losing to Kerri Einarson in the quarterfinals. Team Rocque were invited to compete in the 2022 Tour Challenge Tier 2 event where they qualified for the playoffs with a 3–1 record. They then lost to Clancy Grandy 7–4 in the quarterfinals. After winning the last chance qualifier in Rimbey, the team qualified for the 2023 Alberta Scotties Tournament of Hearts. There, Team Rocque had mixed results, ultimately missing the playoffs with a 4–3 record. The team announced on February 6, 2023, that they would be parting ways. At the end of the season, Brown spared for Sarah Wilkes on Team Homan who was on maternity leave. With the team, she played in two Grand Slams, the 2023 Players' Championship and the 2023 Champions Cup. After missing the playoffs, Team Homan won the Champions Cup, giving Brown her fourth Slam title.

At the start of the 2023–24 season, Brown spared as lead on Team Clancy Grandy for three events, replacing Sarah Loken who was injured. They made it to the quarterfinals of the 2023 PointsBet Invitational before missing the playoffs at the 2023 Players Open and the 2023 Tour Challenge Slam event.

In January 2024, Team Homan named Brown as their alternate for the 2024 Scotties Tournament of Hearts. At the Hearts, the team went undefeated, winning all eleven of their games, including the final, where they beat Jennifer Jones 5–4. It was Jones' last Hearts, as she decided to retire prior to the event. With the Scotties win, the team went on to represent Canada at the 2024 World Women's Curling Championship. At the Worlds, the team had an unmatched 11–1 round robin record which included ending Switzerland and Silvana Tirinzoni's 42 game winning streak at the Women's Worlds, which dated back to the 2021 Worlds. Their only defeat came against South Korea (skipped by Gim Eun-ji) in the last draw, a meaningless game for the team, as they had clinched first place and a bye to the semifinals. Team Canada faced-off against the Koreans again in the semifinals, and this time beat them, 9–7. This put them into the final, where they faced off against the four-time defending World Champion Tirinzoni team. Heading into the ninth end of the game, the team was down 5–4 to the Swiss, but Homan made a split of a rock in the 12-foot on her last to score three, giving her team a 7–5 lead. Switzerland conceded the game in the 10th after deciding they didn't have a shot to tie the game.

Brown, as the alternate for the Homan rink, would complete their bid to represent Canada at the 2026 Winter Olympics by winning the 2025 Canadian Olympic Curling Trials, winning both games against Christina Black in the best-of-three final, marking Brown's first Olympic appearance.

== Personal life ==
Brown currently works as a public service worker. She was formerly a teacher with Black Gold Regional Schools. She is married, and has one child. Her name appears as "Rachel" on her birth certificate, but she grew up spelling (and pronouncing) her name as "Rachelle", as that is what her mother intended on naming her.
