= Val Sweeting =

Canadian curler (born 1987)

- Curler
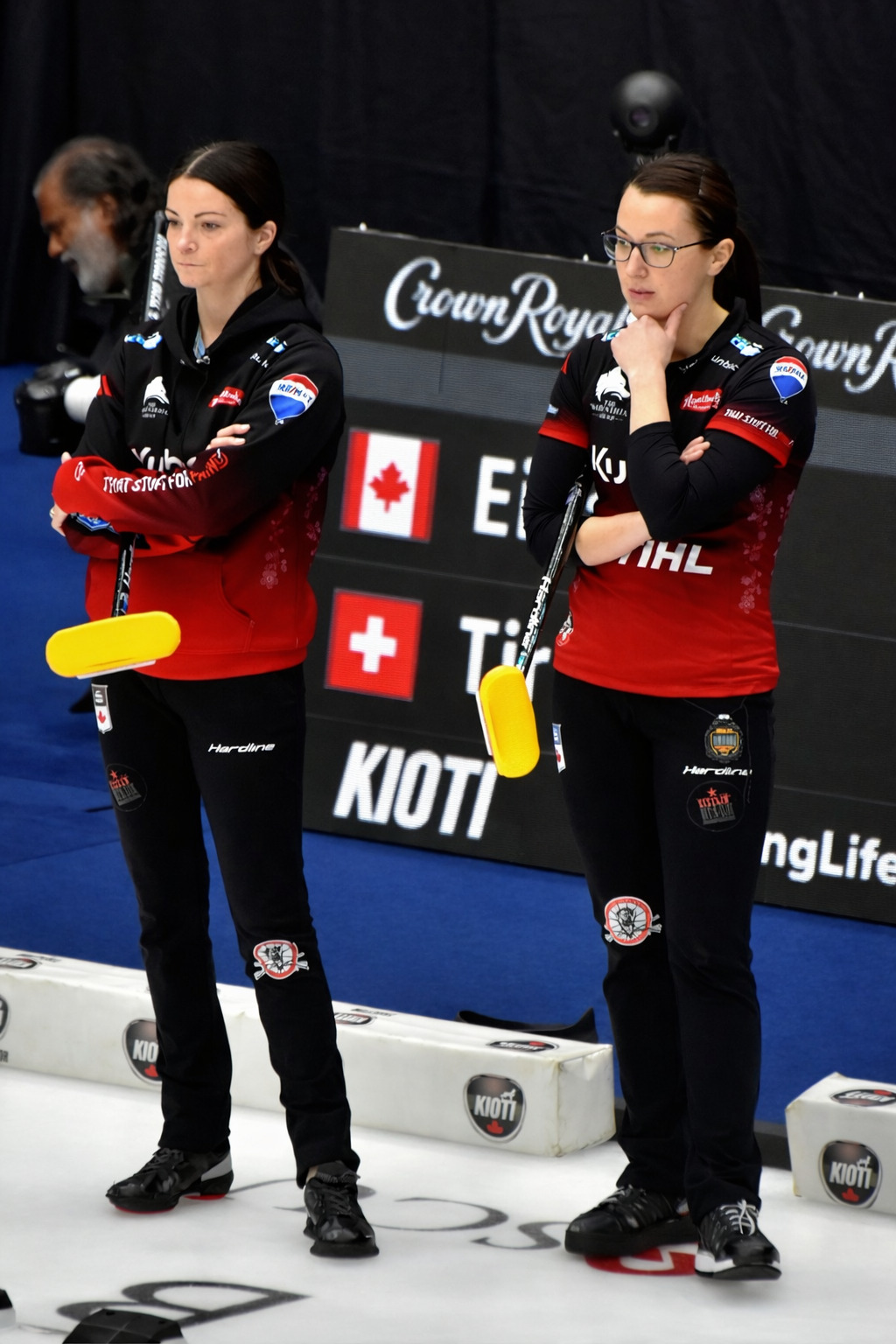
- Sweeting (right) with Einarson at the 2026 Players' Championship in Steinbach, Manitoba.
- Born: Valerie Sweeting; July 9, 1987 (age 39); Redvers, Saskatchewan, Canada

Team
- Curling club: Gimli CC, Gimli, MB; Saville Community SC; Edmonton, AB
- Skip: Val Sweeting
- Fourth: Kayla MacMillan
- Second: Lindsay Dubue
- Lead: Lauren Lenentine

Curling career
- Member Association: Saskatchewan (2007–2009); Alberta (2009–2018); Manitoba (2018–2026); British Columbia (2026–present)
- Hearts: 10 (2010, 2014, 2015, 2020, 2021, 2022, 2023, 2024, 2025, 2026)
- World Championship: 4 (2021, 2022, 2023, 2026)
- Pan Continental Championship: 2 (2022, 2023)
- Top CTRS ranking: 1st (2019–20, 2022–23)
- Grand Slam victories: 8 (2014 Masters, 2016 Tour Challenge, 2017 Tour Challenge, 2019 Players', 2021 Players', 2022 Champions Cup, 2022 Masters, 2024 Tour Challenge)
Medal record
Women's curling
Representing Canada
World Championships
Silver medal – second place	2026 Calgary
Bronze medal – third place	2022 Prince George
Bronze medal – third place	2023 Sandviken
Pan Continental Championships
Bronze medal – third place	2022 Calgary
Scotties Tournament of Hearts
Gold medal – first place	2021 Calgary
Gold medal – first place	2022 Thunder Bay
Gold medal – first place	2023 Kamloops
Gold medal – first place	2026 Mississauga
Representing Alberta
Canadian Mixed Doubles Olympics Trials
Silver medal – second place	2018 Portage la Prairie
Scotties Tournament of Hearts
Silver medal – second place	2014 Montreal
Silver medal – second place	2015 Moose Jaw
Representing Manitoba
Canadian Olympic Curling Trials
Bronze medal – third place	2025 Halifax
Scotties Tournament of Hearts
Gold medal – first place	2020 Moose Jaw
Silver medal – second place	2025 Thunder Bay

Valerie Sweeting (born July 9, 1987 in Redvers, Saskatchewan) is a Canadian curler from Lottie Lake, Alberta She currently throws third stones and skips Team Kayla MacMillan. From 2018 to 2026, she played third on Team Kerri Einarson with whom she won five Scotties Tournament of Hearts (2020, 2021, 2022, 2023, 2026). Sweeting also skipped Alberta to a silver medal at the 2014 and 2015 national championships.

== Career ==
Sweeting grew up in Maryfield, Saskatchewan. In 2007, Sweeting played third for Hailey Surik's junior rink out of Saskatoon, Saskatchewan. The team represented Saskatchewan at the 2007 Canadian Junior Curling Championships. After posting an 8–4 record, they lost to Manitoba in a tiebreaker match.

After juniors, Sweeting moved to Alberta where she formed her own team with Megan Anderson at third, Carly Quigley at second and Whitney Eckstrand at lead. In 2010, in her very first provincial championship, Sweeting surprised many by defeating former World championship bronze medalist Cathy King and Olympic bronze medalist Shannon Kleibrink to capture the provincial crown. She would be the youngest skip ever to represent Alberta at the national Scotties Tournament of Hearts. At the 2010 Scotties Tournament of Hearts, she skipped her province to a 4–7 record.

Sweeting played in her first Grand Slam event later in the season. Ranked 44th going into the 2010 Players' Championship, she won three straight games after losing to Kleibrink, qualifying her for the playoffs. She then lost in the quarterfinal to Stefanie Lawton.

After the 2009–10 season, Sweeting re-jigged her team's lineup, adding Leslie Rogers at third, replacing Quigley. The team had a less eventful season in 2010–11, including winning just one game at the 2011 Alberta Scotties Tournament of Hearts. After the season, Sweeting brought in a new front-end of Joanne Courtney and Rachelle Pidherny. The team improved on the year before, and finished in fourth place at the 2012 Alberta Scotties Tournament of Hearts. Following the season, Sweeting added Dana Ferguson at third position, replacing Rogers.

In the 2012–13 season, Sweeting's rink narrowly missed the playoffs at the 2013 Alberta Scotties Tournament of Hearts, but the team was able to gain enough CTRS points to qualify for the 2013 Canadian Olympic Pre-Trials. The team was one of the qualifiers in the event, giving them the right to play in the 2013 Canadian Olympic Curling Trials. At the trials, Sweeting led her rink to a 3–4 record, failing to qualify for the playoffs. Also in the 2013–14 season, the rink had two quarterfinal appearances at Grand Slams, at the 2013 Curlers Corner Autumn Gold Curling Classic and the 2013 Colonial Square Ladies Classic. Sweeting continued her success that season by going undefeated at the 2014 Alberta Scotties Tournament of Hearts, where her team beat Cheryl Bernard in the final. Sweeting then represented Alberta once again at the national championships, the 2014 Scotties Tournament of Hearts. At the Hearts, Sweeting led Alberta to an 8–3 finish following the round robin. This put her into the playoffs, where she beat Saskatchewan's Stefanie Lawton and Manitoba's Chelsea Carey to advance to the final. There, she lost to Ontario's Rachel Homan 8–6 to win the silver medal.

After the 2013–14 season, Sweeting's third Joanne Courtney left the team to play for the Homan rink, whom they had lost to in the 2014 Scotties final. She would be replaced by Andrea Crawford, who left the team early in the season when things weren't working out. With Cathy Overton-Clapham playing third as their spare, they won their first slam at the 2014 Masters of Curling. With Lori Olson-Johns as their new full-time third, they also made it to the semifinals at two slams and the quarterfinals at one other. They also won the 2014 Canada Cup of Curling, defeating Homan in the final. The team would win the 2015 Alberta Scotties Tournament of Hearts, earning the team a berth at the 2015 Scotties Tournament of Hearts. There, Sweeting led her rink to a 9–2 round robin record, good enough for second place, behind Team Manitoba, skipped by Jennifer Jones. They would go on to lose to Manitoba in the 1 vs. 2 game, but rebounded in the semifinal, beating Saskatchewan (skipped by Stefanie Lawton), before losing to Jones again in the final.

The team found less success in their next season. They won just one tour event (the 2015 HDF Insurance Shoot-Out), though they still made the playoffs in five of the six slams of the season, including making it to the finals of the 2015 Masters, where they lost to Homan. The team would not represent Alberta at the Scotties, as they lost in the finals of the 2016 Alberta Scotties Tournament of Hearts to the Chelsea Carey rink, who would end up winning the national title.

In the 2016–17 season, the Sweeting rink made the playoffs in five of the six slams, including winning the 2016 GSOC Tour Challenge and losing in the final of the 2017 Players' Championship. The team again lost in the finals of the 2017 Alberta Scotties Tournament of Hearts, this time losing to Shannon Kleibrink. The next season, Sweeting defended her title by winning the 2017 GSOC Tour Challenge. Sweeting played in the 2017 Canadian Olympic Curling Trials, going 4–4, just missing the playoffs. Her dreams of making the Olympics would not be over though, as she teamed up with Brad Gushue to play in the 2018 Canadian Mixed Doubles Curling Olympic Trials. The pair went 5–3 in the round robin, but rallied off three straight victories in the playoffs to make it to the finals. There, they lost to John Morris and Kaitlyn Lawes. Sweeting then turned her attention to the 2018 Alberta Scotties Tournament of Hearts, where she lost in the 3 vs. 4 game. In addition to winning the Tour Challenge, the Sweeting team made the playoffs in one more slam that season, the 2017 Boost National.

In February 2018, it was announced that the Sweeting team would be breaking up with Sweeting joining the all-skip squad of Kerri Einarson, Shannon Birchard and Briane Meilleur for the 2018–19 season. Sweeting would play third on the team. They began the season by winning three straight World Curling Tour events in three weeks: the 2018 Stu Sells Oakville Tankard, the inaugural Morris SunSpiel and then the Mother Club Fall Curling Classic with a fourth win at the Curlers Corner Autumn Gold Classic in October. In December, the team lost in the finals of the 2018 Canada Cup and 2018 National. Their strong play during the early part of the season earned them enough points to put team Einarson in the Wild Card game at the 2019 Scotties Tournament of Hearts. However, the team lost to the lower-ranked Casey Scheidegger rink. The team would rebound to have a strong finish at the end of the season, winning the 2019 Players' Championship and losing in the final of the 2019 Champions Cup.

Team Einarson had two playoff finishes at the first two Slams of the 2019–20 season, losing to Anna Hasselborg in the quarterfinal of the Masters and once again to Hasselborg in the final of the Tour Challenge. The team did not have the same success at the Canada Cup as they did in 2018, finishing with a 2–4 record. However, at the 2020 Manitoba Scotties Tournament of Hearts, her team succeeded. They finished the round robin and championship round with a 7–1 record, which qualified them for the final. There, they defeated Jennifer Jones. It was Sweeting's first Manitoba Scotties Tournament of Hearts provincial title. Team Einarson represented Manitoba at the 2020 Scotties Tournament of Hearts, where they continued their success. They finished first in the round robin with a 9–2 record and then won the 1 vs. 2 page playoff game, qualifying them for the final. Sweeting won her first Canadian Championship when they defeated Rachel Homan 8–7 in and extra end. Sweeting was named the All-Star Third for the tournament. The team was set to represent Canada at the 2020 World Women's Curling Championship before the event was cancelled due to the COVID-19 pandemic. The Scotties would be their last event of the season as both the Players' Championship and the Champions Cup Grand Slam events were also cancelled due to the pandemic.

Team Einarson returned to the Scotties Tournament of Hearts in 2021 as Team Canada. They went 7–1 in the round robin, with their only loss coming against Ontario's Rachel Homan. This qualified them for the championship round. There, they won three games and lost one to Manitoba's Jennifer Jones. They advanced to the playoffs as the second seed, defeating Alberta's Laura Walker 9–3 in the semifinal. In the final, they defeated Homan to win their second consecutive Scotties gold. Sweeting was named the First Team All-Star third for the second year in a row. A month later, Sweeting was back in the Calgary bubble to compete with Marc Kennedy at the 2021 Canadian Mixed Doubles Curling Championship. The pair qualified for the playoffs with a 5–1 record before losing to Lisa Weagle and John Epping in the round of 12, eliminating them from contention. Sweeting returned to the bubble for a third time in April 2021, along with her women's team to play in the two only Grand Slam events of the abbreviated season. The team made it to the semifinals of the 2021 Champions Cup where they lost to Team Homan, but got their revenge at the 2021 Players' Championship a week later, where they beat Homan in the final. The following week, Team Einarson represented Canada at the 2021 World Women's Curling Championship. The team had a slow start to the event, falling to 1–5 after their first six games. They turned things around, however, winning six of their seven remaining round robin games to qualifying for the playoffs. They then faced Sweden's Anna Hasselborg in the qualification game, which they lost 8–3.

The Einarson rink had a slow start to the 2021–22 season, failing to win any of their first five tour events. Their best finish came at the 2021 Sherwood Park Women's Curling Classic where they lost in the final to Tracy Fleury. The team reached the quarterfinals of the 2021 Masters, however, then missed the playoffs at the 2021 National. At the 2021 Canadian Olympic Curling Trials, the team went through the round robin with a 4–4 record. This earned them a spot in the first tiebreaker, where they defeated Casey Scheidegger 8–6. They then faced Krista McCarville in the second tiebreaker, where they lost 4–3 and were eliminated. The team's next event was the 2022 Scotties Tournament of Hearts in Thunder Bay, Ontario. Through the round robin, the defending Scotties champions posted a perfect 8–0 record, earning a spot in the playoffs. They then lost in the seeding round to New Brunswick's Andrea Crawford, meaning they would have to win three straight games to defend their championship title. In the playoffs, the team won the 3 vs. 4 page playoff against Team Fleury and then defeated New Brunswick's Crawford in the semifinal to reach the Scotties final where they would face Northern Ontario's McCarville rink. After controlling the entire game, Team Einarson sealed the victory with a steal of one in the tenth end. With the win, they became just the fourth team to win three consecutive Scotties titles. They then went on to represent Canada at the 2022 World Women's Curling Championship, where they fared much better than in 2021. The team finished the round robin tied for second place with a 9–3 record, however, due to their draw shot challenge, finished third overall. This placed them in the qualification game where they defeated Denmark's Madeleine Dupont to advance to the semifinal. There, they took on South Korea's Kim Eun-jung. After taking control in the seventh end, South Korea stole the ninth and tenth ends to hand the Canadian team a 9–6 loss. They were able to rebound in the bronze medal game with an 8–7 victory over Sweden's Anna Hasselborg. Team Einarson wrapped up their season at the final two Slams of the season. At the 2022 Players' Championship, they made it all the way to the final where they were defeated by the Hasselborg rink. At the 2022 Champions Cup, the team secured their third Grand Slam title as a foursome with a 10–6 victory over Gim Eun-ji.

The 2022–23 season began for Team Einarson at the 2022 PointsBet Invitational single elimination event where they entered as the top seeded team. After defeating Tracey Larocque and Kelsey Rocque, they lost 9–5 to the new Jennifer Jones rink in the semifinal. The team next played in the first Slam of the year, the 2022 National, where they lost 7–3 to Silvana Tirinzoni in the event final. They also reached the final of the 2022 Tour Challenge where they lost 8–4 to Rachel Homan. Team Einarson was chosen to represent Canada at the 2022 Pan Continental Curling Championships where they qualified for the playoffs as the second seeds with a 7–1 record. They then lost 6–5 to Japan in the semifinal but rebounded to beat the United States in the bronze medal game. The team won their fourth Grand Slam together by going undefeated to claim the 2022 Masters. In December, they travelled to Japan to compete in the 2022 Karuizawa International Curling Championships where they lost in the final to Kim Eun-jung. In the new year, Team Einarson made it to another Slam final where they lost 5–3 to Satsuki Fujisawa. Returning to the 2023 Scotties Tournament of Hearts as Team Canada, the team again went undefeated through the round robin but lost in the page seeding game to Manitoba's Jones. They then won both the 3 vs. 4 game and the semifinal over Nova Scotia and Northern Ontario respectively to reach another national final where they again faced Jones. After trading singles, Team Canada stole two in the fifth end to open a two-point lead. They secured their record tying fourth Scotties title with a score of five in the ninth end. The team then advanced to the 2023 World Women's Curling Championship where they reached the playoffs again with a 7–5 record. After defeating Japan in the qualification game, they lost in the semifinals for a second year in a row, 8–5 to Norway. They won another bronze medal after an 8–5 win over Sweden. Team Einarson reached the semifinals of the 2023 Players' Championship where they fell 10–3 to Isabella Wranå. They finished their season at the 2023 Champions Cup where they lost 6–5 to Team Homan in the championship game.

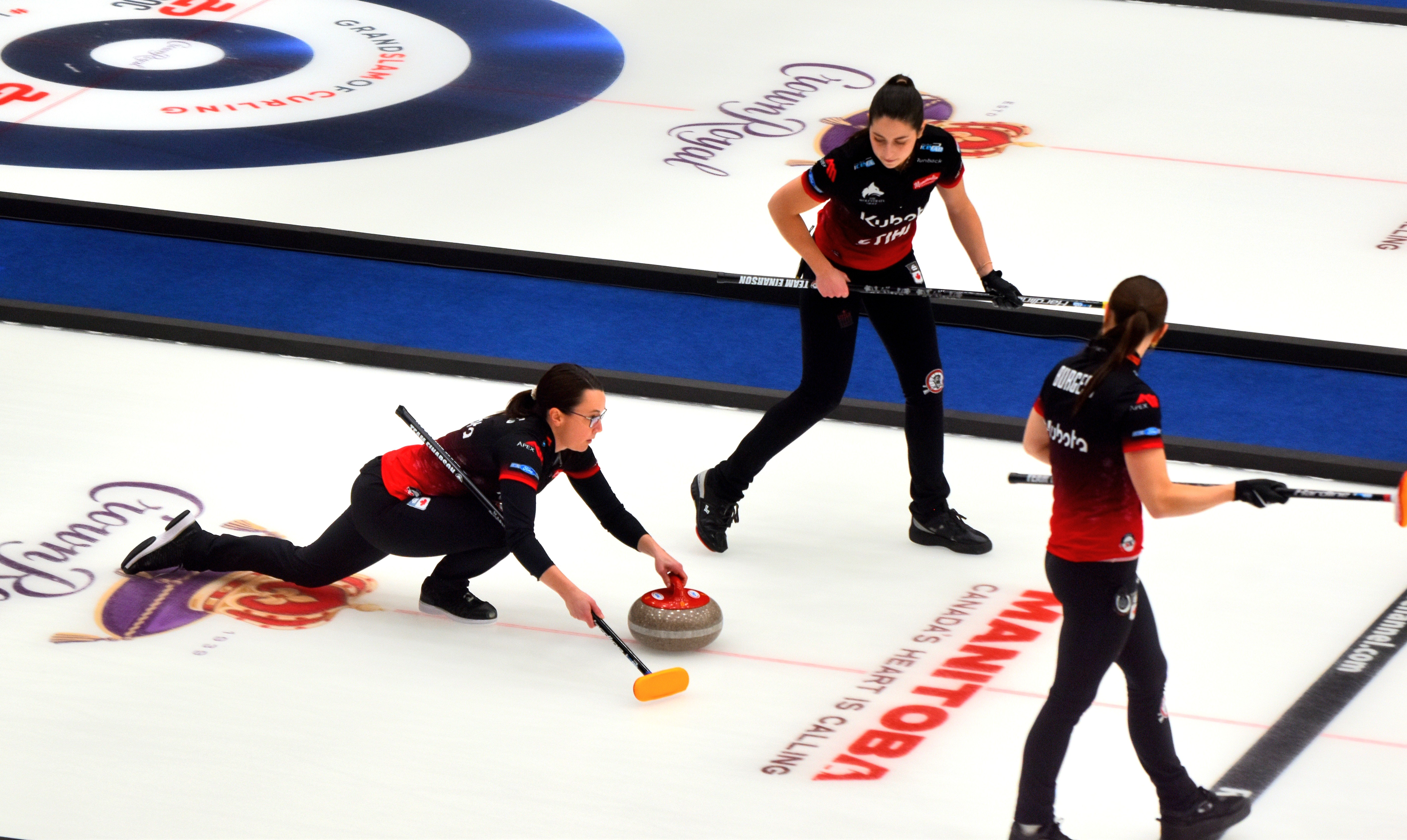
Sweeting throws a rock in the final of the 2026 Players' Championship against Silvana Tirinzoni in Steinbach, Manitoba.

Team Einarson reached the quarterfinals in their first event of the 2023–24 season, falling to Serena Gray-Withers at the 2023 Saville Shootout. The team then played in the 2023 PointsBet Invitational where they lost in the final to Team Homan. For the second year in a row, they were chosen to represent Canada at the 2023 Pan Continental Curling Championships. The team did not have a great week, however, losing both the semifinal and bronze medal game to finish fourth. In Grand Slam play, Team Einarson failed to reach any finals for the first time since forming. They had three semifinal finishes and one quarterfinal appearance before missing the playoffs at the 2024 Players' Championship, breaking their streak of qualifying at the previous twelve Slams. A few hours prior to the first draw of the 2024 Scotties Tournament of Hearts, Curling Canada announced that the team's lead Briane Harris was deemed "ineligible" to play in the tournament without going into any more detail. She was replaced by alternate Krysten Karwacki. Despite the disturbance, Team Einarson managed a 7–1 record through the round robin to qualify for the championship round. Once there, however, they lost both their games to Team Homan and Manitoba's Kate Cameron, eliminating them from contention and ending their chance of a record setting fifth straight Scotties title. Following the event, in March, it was revealed that Harris had been provisionally suspended for up to four years for testing positive for Ligandrol, a banned substance. She will be appealing the decision to the Court of Arbitration for Sport. Harris was also replaced by Karwacki for the Players' Championship at the end of the season.

Team Einarson announced that for the 2024-25 curling season, Karwacki would join the team as a lead full-time, and Harris had left the team. The new Einarson rink had a strong start to the season, winning the first Grand Slam event of the season, the 2024 Tour Challenge. However, halfway through the season, Birchard announced she would miss the remainder of the season due to a knee injury, and was replaced by Karlee Burgess as second for the remained of the season. At the 2025 Scotties Tournament of Hearts, Einarson would finish in second place, losing to Team Homan 6-1 in the final. At the end of the season, after Birchard recovered from her injury, Einarson announced for the 2025-26 curling season that Birchard would remain as second, with Burgess throwing lead stones, and Karwacki being the alternate. In their first event of the season, Einarson would win the 2025 Saville Shootout, beating Gim Eun-ji in the final. Einarson would then compete at the 2025 Canadian Olympic Curling Trials, finishing the round robin with a 6–1 record, qualifying for the playoffs. Einarson would then lose to Nova Scotia's Christina Black 6–3 in the semifinals, finishing in 3rd place. Team Einarson would rebound by winning the 2026 Scotties Tournament of Hearts, beating Manitoba's Kaitlyn Lawes 4–3 in the final, and represent Canada at the 2026 World Women's Curling Championship. There, they would go on to win the silver medal, losing to Switzerland's Xenia Schwaller 7–5 in the final.

== Personal life ==
Sweeting is a graduate of the University of Saskatchewan. She is currently the owner of Sweeting Wellness Company. She has one son.

== Grand Slam record ==
Key
C	Champion
F	Lost in Final
SF	Lost in Semifinal
QF	Lost in Quarterfinals
R16	Lost in the round of 16
Q	Did not advance to playoffs
T2	Played in Tier 2 event
DNP	Did not participate in event
N/A	Not a Grand Slam event that season

Event	2009–10	2010–11	2011–12	2012–13	2013–14	2014–15	2015–16	2016–17	2017–18	2018–19	2019–20	2020–21	2021–22	2022–23	2023–24	2024–25	2025–26	2026–27
Invitational	N/A	N/A	N/A	N/A	N/A	N/A	Q	C	C	SF	F	N/A	N/A	F	SF	C	QF	Q
Masters	N/A	N/A	N/A	Q	DNP	C	F	Q	Q	Q	QF	N/A	QF	C	SF	QF	Q	DNP
National	N/A	N/A	N/A	N/A	N/A	N/A	SF	QF	QF	F	Q	N/A	Q	F	QF	SF	Q	DNP
Open	N/A	N/A	N/A	N/A	N/A	SF	QF	SF	Q	Q	QF	N/A	N/A	F	SF	QF	QF	DNP
Players'	QF	DNP	DNP	DNP	Q	SF	QF	F	DNP	C	N/A	C	F	SF	Q	Q	F	
Champions Cup	N/A	N/A	N/A	N/A	N/A	N/A	QF	QF	Q	F	N/A	SF	C	F	N/A	N/A	N/A	N/A

=== Former events ===
Event	2009–10	2010–11	2011–12	2012–13	2013–14	2014–15
Colonial Square	N/A	N/A	N/A	Q	QF	QF
Autumn Gold	DNP	Q	Q	Q	QF	Q
Manitoba Liquor & Lotteries	DNP	DNP	Q	Q	Q	N/A
Sobeys Slam	N/A	Q	N/A	N/A	N/A	N/A

== Teams ==
Season	Skip	Third	Second	Lead
2009–10	Val Sweeting	Megan Anderson	Carley Quigley-O'Brien	Whitney Eckstrand
2010–11	Val Sweeting	Leslie Hammond	Megan Anderson	Whitney Eckstrand
2011–12	Val Sweeting	Leslie Hammond	Joanne Courtney	Rachelle Brown
2012–13	Val Sweeting	Dana Ferguson	Joanne Courtney	Rachelle Brown
2013–14	Val Sweeting	Joanne Courtney	Dana Ferguson	Rachelle Brown
2014–15	Val Sweeting	Lori Olson-Johns	Dana Ferguson	Rachelle Brown
2015–16	Val Sweeting	Lori Olson-Johns	Dana Ferguson	Rachelle Brown
2016–17	Val Sweeting	Lori Olson-Johns	Dana Ferguson	Rachelle Brown
2017–18	Val Sweeting	Lori Olson-Johns	Dana Ferguson	Rachelle Brown
2018–19	Kerri Einarson	Val Sweeting	Shannon Birchard	Briane Meilleur
2019–20	Kerri Einarson	Val Sweeting	Shannon Birchard	Briane Meilleur
2020–21	Kerri Einarson	Val Sweeting	Shannon Birchard	Briane Meilleur
2021–22	Kerri Einarson	Val Sweeting	Shannon Birchard	Briane Meilleur
2022–23	Kerri Einarson	Val Sweeting	Shannon Birchard	Briane Harris
2023–24	Kerri Einarson	Val Sweeting	Shannon Birchard	Briane Harris
2024–25	Kerri Einarson	Val Sweeting	Shannon Birchard	Krysten Karwacki
2024–25	Kerri Einarson	Val Sweeting	Karlee Burgess	Krysten Karwacki
2025–26	Kerri Einarson	Val Sweeting	Shannon Birchard	Karlee Burgess
2026–27	Kayla MacMillan (Fourth)	Val Sweeting (Skip)	Lindsay Dubue	Lauren Lenentine
