= Joanne Courtney =

Canadian curler

- Curler
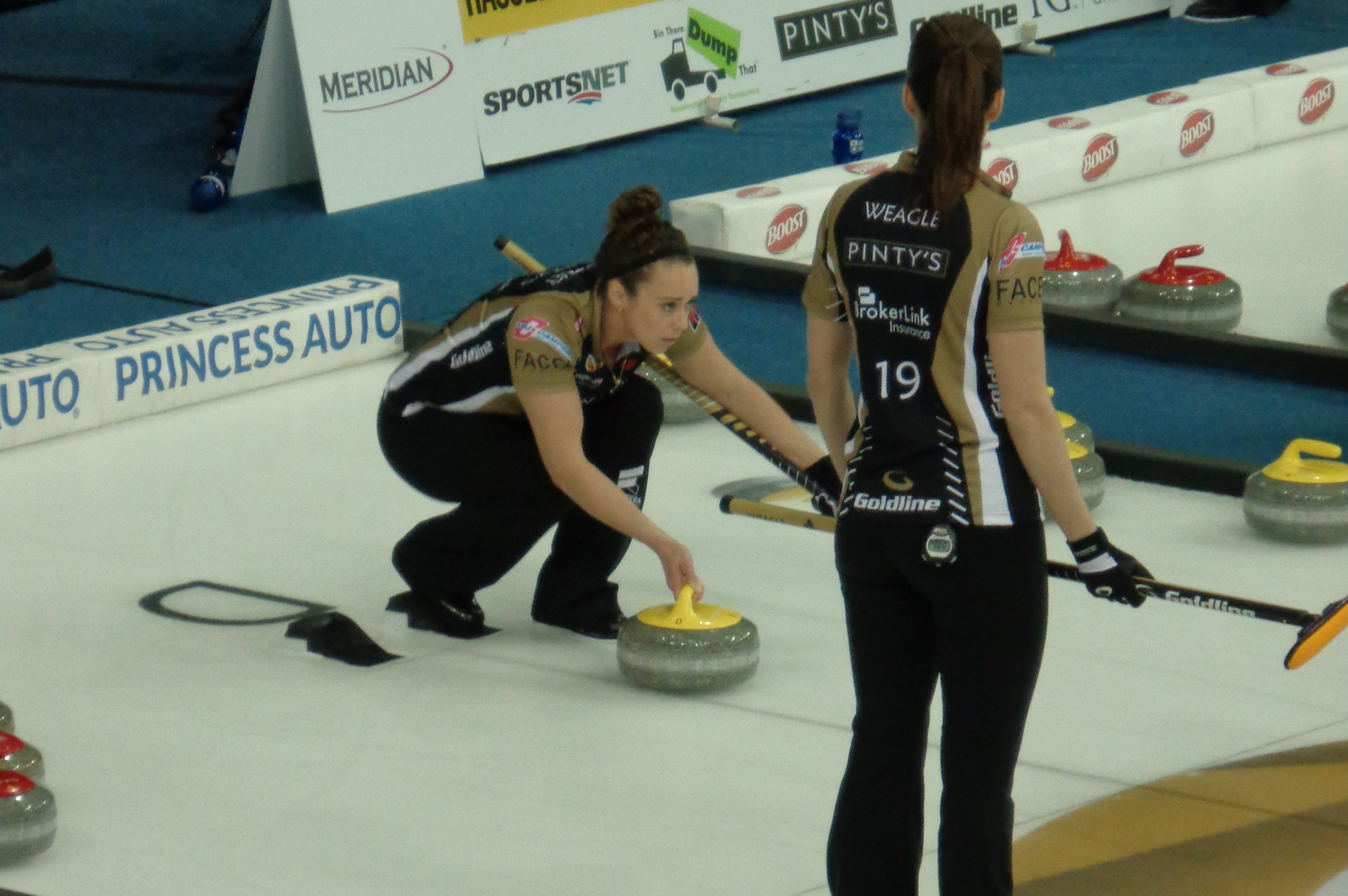
- Courtney at the 2018 WCT Arctic Cup
- Born: Joanne Taylor; March 7, 1989 (age 37); Edmonton, Alberta

Team
- Curling club: Ottawa CC, Ottawa, ON; Lacombe CC, Lacombe, AB

Curling career
- Member Association: Alberta (2006–2014); Ontario (2014–2022)
- Hearts: 7 (2014, 2015, 2017, 2019, 2020, 2021, 2022)
- World Championship: 1 (2017)
- World Mixed Doubles Championship: 1 (2017)
- Olympic: 1 (2018)
- Top CTRS ranking: 1st (2015–16, 2016–17, 2018–19)
- Grand Slam victories: 8 (2015 Masters, 2015 National, 2015 Canadian Open, 2018 Champions Cup, 2018 Tour Challenge, 2018 National, 2019 Canadian Open, 2021 Champions Cup)
Medal record
Women's curling
Representing Canada
World Curling Championships
Gold medal – first place	2017 Beijing
World Mixed Doubles Championship
Silver medal – second place	2017 Lethbridge
Scotties Tournament of Hearts
Bronze medal – third place	2015 Moose Jaw
Representing Alberta
Scotties Tournament of Hearts
Silver medal – second place	2014 Montreal
Canadian Mixed Doubles Championship
Gold medal – first place	2017 Saskatoon
Bronze medal – third place	2018 Leduc
Representing Ontario
Canadian Olympic Curling Trials
Gold medal – first place	2017 Ottawa
Scotties Tournament of Hearts
Gold medal – first place	2017 St Catharines
Silver medal – second place	2019 Sydney
Silver medal – second place	2020 Moose Jaw
Silver medal – second place	2021 Calgary

Joanne Margaret Courtney (born March 7, 1989, as Joanne Taylor) is a Canadian curler from Edmonton, Alberta. From 2014 to 2022, she was a member of the Rachel Homan rink which won the 2017 World Women's Curling Championship and represented Canada at the 2018 Winter Olympics.

In 2023, she became a curling analyst for TSN, with the 2023 Scotties Tournament of Hearts becoming the first event she covered for the network. She also covered curling for the CBC during the 2022 Winter Olympics.

== Career ==
=== Alberta playing for Sweeting ===
Courtney played third for Val Sweeting. She gained recognition in the curling world for her aggressive sweeping style together with Rachelle Pidherny. Though Courtney threw third rocks, she did not hold the broom for the skip, but instead brushed with the front end. Dana Ferguson, the team's second, served as vice-skip for Sweeting.

=== Move to Ontario ===
It was announced that Courtney would join the Rachel Homan rink for the 2014–15 season, replacing Alison Kreviazuk at second position. The team did not win any Slam events their first season, losing in the finals of the 2014 Curlers Corner Autumn Gold Curling Classic (against Jennifer Jones) and the 2014 Canadian Open of Curling (against Eve Muirhead). Courtney lost in the final of the 2014 Canada Cup of Curling against former teammate Val Sweeting. As defending champions, the team represented Team Canada at the 2015 Scotties Tournament of Hearts. The team nearly missed the playoffs but won their last round-robin game against Tracy Horgan to finish the round robin in 4th place with a 7–4 record. In the playoffs they would lose to Saskatchewan's Stefanie Lawton in the 3 vs. 4 game, but rebounded in the bronze medal game in a re-match against the Lawton rink, beating them 7–5. That season, the team would win one World Curling Tour event, the Pomeroy Inn & Suites Prairie Showdown held in March. That season, the team also won the inaugural 2016 Women's All-Star Curling Skins Game, taking home $52,000.

The team found much more success in the 2015–16 curling season, but were still wrought with some disappointment. They began the season with a win in the Stu Sells Oakville Tankard, followed by a loss in the first Slam, the 2015 GSOC Tour Challenge against Switzerland's Silvana Tirinzoni. The team then went on to win six Tour events in a row, the Stockholm Ladies Cup, the Curlers Corner Autumn Gold Curling Classic (no longer a Slam), the 2015 Masters of Curling, the 2015 National, the 2015 Canada Cup of Curling and the 2015 Canadian Open of Curling, amassing a huge lead in both the World Curling Tour Order of Merit and Money standings in the process. After this impressive run, the team's success seemed to dry-up. They were upset in the finals of the 2016 Ontario Scotties Tournament of Hearts against their club mates, the Jenn Hanna team, meaning the World #1 ranked Homan team would not be able to play in the national championships that year. The team was invited to play in the 2016 Elite 10 men's Grand Slam event, making history in the process. The team would only win one game in the event though, beating Charley Thomas' team. The team ended the season losing against Jennifer Jones in the final of the 2016 Humpty's Champions Cup. The Homan rink's success over the course of the season meant the team would end the season ranked number one in the world in both the Women's money list and order of merit standings.

The 2016–17 curling season was one of Courtney's best season to date. Her team began the season winning their first event, the 2016 AMJ Campbell Shorty Jenkins Classic. They followed this up by winning the 2016 Canad Inns Women's Classic the following month. A week later, the team lost in the final of the 2016 Masters of Curling against the Allison Flaxey rink. A month later, they lost in the final of the 2016 Canada Cup of Curling. In playdown play, the rink struggled in the round robin of the 2017 Ontario Scotties Tournament of Hearts, losing two games, and finishing second behind Jacqueline Harrison. However, they won both their playoff matches, including defeating Harrison in the final, qualifying the team to represent Ontario at that year's Scotties. Team Homan defeated Manitoba's Michelle Englot to win the 2017 Scotties, her third Scotties title in four years. She won in an extra end in what many considered to be one of the most exciting Scotties finals ever. Both teams went 10–1 in the round robin, with Homan's lone loss coming at Englot's expense. Englot beat Homan once again in the 1 vs. 2 game, forcing Homan to beat Northern Ontario (Krista McCarville) in the semifinal to force the re-match against Englot. At the 2017 world championship in Beijing the Homan rink became only the third in tournament history to go unbeaten in round-robin play, joining fellow Canadian Colleen Jones from 2003 and Sweden's Anette Norberg from 2005. She ended up going unbeaten right to the end, the only team to do so to date, winning the gold medal by beating Anna Sidorova (for the 3rd consecutive time with wins in the round robin, 1–2 playoff game, and final) 8–3 for the gold medal, her first world title and completing her medal set at worlds. The Homan rink finished the season by winning the 2017 Humpty's Champions Cup.

=== Olympic run (2017–2018) ===
Courtney began the 2017-18 curling season by winning the 2017 Prestige Hotels & Resorts Curling Classic and then the Curlers Corner Autumn Gold Curling Classic the following week. Courtney and her team won the 2017 Canadian Olympic Curling Trials in her hometown of Ottawa, defeating previously unbeaten Chelsea Carey. The Homan rink had lost just one game in the tournament, against Carey in the round robin. After her Trials win, the Homan rink began to struggle. The team would then go on to play at the 2018 Winter Olympics where they started disastrously. Losing to the team from Denmark meant that Canada was 0-3 for the first time ever at an Olympics. The game against Denmark was marked with controversy when Denmark burned a rock as it was coming to a rest. Rather than letting the rock be adjusted Courtney's skip Homan removed the stone. Joan McCusker commentating for CBC at the Olympics said of Homan's move that "I think that was a rash move to take it off. They should have left it in play. It doesn't look good on you." Courtney and team would win their next three to stay in the fight for the medals but would lose their next two, with their fifth loss against Eve Muirhead officially eliminating them from medal contention. This made Homan's team the first Canadian Olympic curlers to not play for or win a medal. They won the final event of the year, the 2018 Humpty's Champions Cup.

=== Post Olympics (2018–2020) ===
Team Homan's 2018-19 curling season began by winning the first leg of the Curling World Cup, defeating Sweden's Anna Hasselborg in the final. Hasselborg got the best of Homan the following month, beating her in the final of the 2018 Masters. Homan then went on to win the next grand slam event, the 2018 Tour Challenge, defeating Tracy Fleury in the final. The Homan rink struggled at the 2018 Canada Cup, going 5–2 in the round robin, and losing in the semifinal to Jennifer Jones. The team rebounded a week later to win the 2018 National, beating Kerri Einarson in the final. The next month, Courtney won her third Grand Slam of the season, the 2019 Meridian Canadian Open, defeating Silvana Tirinzoni in the final. Homan and her rink played in the 2019 Ontario Scotties Tournament of Hearts, having missed the previous year's event due to the Olympics and having won the 2017 Scotties). At the event, the team lost just one game en route to Courtney's third Ontario provincial title. However, controversy brewed due to an incident of bullying aimed at Courtney's skip Homan. A "number of curlers" at the event voted for her to win the tournament's sportsmanship award to protest the fact that the team had two members (herself and Homan) living in Alberta (teams are only allowed one "import" player from out of province, however, Homan maintains a residence in Ontario and is exempted from requirements as she is a full-time student at the University of Alberta). At the 2019 Scotties Tournament of Hearts her team finished the round robin at 5-2 as third seed. The team qualified for the final beating Northern Ontario's Krista McCarville and Saskatchewan's Robyn Silvernagle but eventually finished as runner up, losing the final to Alberta's Chelsea Carey in an extra end despite leading 5–1 in the fourth end. At the 2019 Players' Championship, the team struggled and ended up missing the playoffs after posting a 2-3 round robin record and losing the tie-breaker to Satsuki Fujisawa. They finished off the season with a semi-final finish at the 2019 Champions Cup.

Courtney missed the teams first event of the 2019–20 season, the 2019 AMJ Campbell Shorty Jenkins Classic. Team Homan had a semi-final finish with spare Lindsay Dubue. She returned for the 2019 Colonial Square Ladies Classic, where the team would win the event. The team would appear in another final in mid-October at the 2019 Canad Inns Women's Classic where they lost to Elena Stern. They missed the playoffs at all four Slams of the season as both the Players' Championship and the Champions Cup were cancelled due to the COVID-19 pandemic. Team Homan would win the first spot in the 2021 Canadian Olympic Curling Trials by defeating Tracy Fleury in the final of the 2019 Canada Cup. The team went undefeated at the 2020 Ontario Scotties Tournament of Hearts, defeating Hollie Duncan in the final. At the 2020 Scotties Tournament of Hearts they would win their second straight silver medal, losing the final this year to Manitoba's Kerri Einarson.

=== Sarah Wilkes joins the team (2021–present) ===
Team Homan announced on March 12, 2020, that the team was parting ways with longtime lead Lisa Weagle. On March 17, 2020, the team announced they would be adding Sarah Wilkes as their new second, with Courtney moving to lead.

The 2021 Ontario provincial playdowns were cancelled due to the COVID-19 pandemic in Ontario. As the 2020 provincial champions, Homan's team was chosen to represent Ontario at the 2021 Scotties Tournament of Hearts in Calgary. Up to that point, they had only played in one tour game the entire season in the Okotoks Ladies Classic in November, before that event was cancelled due to a province-wide shutdown in Alberta. At the Scotties, they had a successful round robin, with a 7–1 record, including a win against defending champion Kerri Einarson. They entered the championship pool as the first seed, where they won three games and lost one to Manitoba's Jennifer Jones. Because of their earlier win against Einarson, Homan's team received a bye to the final. There, they lost 9–7 to Einarson after Homan missed a freeze in the last end, resulting in Einarson not needing to throw her last rock. Courtney was named Second Team All-Star lead for the tournament. A month later, Courtney was back in the Calgary bubble to compete with Darren Moulding at the 2021 Canadian Mixed Doubles Curling Championship. Halfway through the event, Darren Moulding experienced back spasms, forcing the pair to pull out of the competition. They had won all of their games up until that point. Courtney returned to the bubble a third time in April 2021 with Team Homan to play in the two only Grand Slam events of the abbreviated season. At the first Slam, the 2021 Champions Cup, the team defeated Silvana Tirinzoni to win the event. A week later, they played in the 2021 Players' Championship, where they lost in the final to Team Einarson in a re-match of the Scotties final.

Team Homan made it to the quarterfinals of their first slam of the year, the 2021 Masters, where they were beaten by Alina Kovaleva. Two weeks later, they played in the 2021 National, where they were eliminated in the quarters again, this time by Anna Hasselborg. Next for Team Homan was the 2021 Canadian Olympic Curling Trials where they attempted to qualify for the Olympics again. The team, however, did not have a successful week, finishing with a 2–6 record. Team Homan's record over the season was not good enough to give them an automatic qualifying spot at the 2022 Ontario Scotties Tournament of Hearts, forcing them to play in an open qualifier. The team did qualify at the Open Qualifier, but the Ontario Scotties were postponed due to new COVID-19 regulations put into place by the province, shutting down sports event. With the postponement of the Ontario Scotties, CurlON announced that they would be selecting Team Hollie Duncan over Team Homan to represent Ontario if Homan was selected to represent Canada in the mixed doubles event at the 2022 Olympics (as the Trials had been cancelled). However, if Homan wasn't selected, then CurlON would select Team Homan to play in the Scotties instead. This plan of action was considered confusion and disappointing to the teams involved. Homan would end up being selected to represent Canada at the Olympics, giving Team Duncan the right to represent Ontario at the 2022 Scotties. However, the rest of Team Homan qualified for the Scotties as Team Wild Card #3. For the Tournament of Hearts, Courtney, Emma Miskew and Sarah Wilkes added Allison Flaxey to their lineup. At the championship, the team finished with a 4–4 round robin record, not advancing to the playoff round. Team Homan had to wait until April 2022 to play in the postponed Ontario Hearts, which they ended up winning, beating Carly Howard in the final. The team wrapped up their season with the two final slams, making it to the semifinals at the 2022 Players' Championship where they lost to Anna Hasselborg, and the quarters of the 2022 Champions Cup, where they lost to Kerri Einarson.

In March 2022, Courtney announced she would be stepping back from competitive curling.

=== Mixed doubles ===
In addition to playing women's curling, Courtney won the 2017 Canadian Mixed Doubles Curling Trials with partner Reid Carruthers. The pair would go on to represent Canada at the 2017 World Mixed Doubles Curling Championship where they won the silver medal.

== Personal life ==
Courtney is employed as a registered nurse at the University of Alberta Hospital. She graduated from the University of Alberta in 2011 with a bachelor's degree in Nursing. She is married to Mark Courtney, and they have a son and daughter. Her parents are Ryan and Ellen Taylor.

== Teams ==
Season	Skip	Third	Second	Lead
2010–11	Crystal Webster	Lori Olson-Johns	Joanne Courtney	Samantha Preston
2011–12	Val Sweeting	Leslie Hammond	Joanne Courtney	Rachelle Brown
2012–13	Val Sweeting	Dana Ferguson	Joanne Courtney	Rachelle Brown
2013–14	Val Sweeting	Joanne Courtney	Dana Ferguson	Rachelle Brown
2014–15	Rachel Homan	Emma Miskew	Joanne Courtney	Lisa Weagle
2015–16	Rachel Homan	Emma Miskew	Joanne Courtney	Lisa Weagle
2016–17	Rachel Homan	Emma Miskew	Joanne Courtney	Lisa Weagle
2017–18	Rachel Homan	Emma Miskew	Joanne Courtney	Lisa Weagle
2018–19	Rachel Homan	Emma Miskew	Joanne Courtney	Lisa Weagle
2019–20	Rachel Homan	Emma Miskew	Joanne Courtney	Lisa Weagle
2020–21	Rachel Homan	Emma Miskew	Sarah Wilkes	Joanne Courtney
2021–22	Rachel Homan	Emma Miskew	Sarah Wilkes	Joanne Courtney
