= Lori Olson-Johns =

Canadian curler

- Curler
- Born: Lori Olson; November 24, 1976 (age 49); Toronto, Ontario, Canada

Team
- Curling club: Saville Community SC, Edmonton, AB

Curling career
- Member Association: Alberta (1992–2019); Manitoba (2022)
- Hearts: 4 (2005, 2006, 2015, 2022)
- Top CTRS ranking: 2nd (2014–15)
- Grand Slam victories: 2 (2016 Tour Challenge, 2017 Tour Challenge)
Medal record
Women's curling
Representing Alberta
Scotties Tournament of Hearts
Silver medal – second place	2015 Moose Jaw

Lori Olson (born on November 24, 1976), better known as Lori Olson-Johns is a Canadian curler from Edmonton, Alberta. From 2014 to 2018, she played third for Val Sweeting and, with Sweeting, finished runner-up at the 2015 Scotties Tournament of Hearts and won two grand slam events (the 2016 and 2017 Tour Challenge).

== Curling career ==
=== 1992–2000 ===
Olson-Johns is a three-time Alberta junior champion. Her first national experience was playing second stones for Rhonda Sinclair at the 1992 Canadian Junior Curling Championships. The team would finish round robin with a 7–4 record, finding themselves in a tiebreaker. They would end up losing the tiebreaker to Quebec's Janique Berthelot. In 1995, Olson-Johns would return to the championships, playing third for Jodi Lee. The team finished round robin with a 5–6 record. Her final junior appearance was at the 1997 Canadian Juniors, this time playing third stones for Kristie Moore. The team had a rough go, finishing round robin with a 3–9 record.

In 1998 Olson-Johns participated in her first Alberta Women's Provincial Championships, returning again in 1999 and 2000.

=== 2000–2010 ===
Olson-Johns continued to compete in Alberta Women's Provincial Championships but did not see success until 2005, when she played third for skip Cathy King. They won the Alberta championship and went on to the 2005 Scott Tournament of Hearts, where they finished the round robin at 6–5, and lost the first of two tie breakers to Ontario's Jenn Hanna. Her team once again won the 2006 and finished with a 6–5 record, this time not qualifying for a tie breaker. In 2009 playing third for Calgary's Crystal Webster, Olson-Johns participated in the Canadian Olympic Pre-Trials, where they were the first women's team to qualify for the Olympic Trials, however they would only finish with a 2–5 record.

=== 2011–2014 ===
At the end of the 2010–11 season, Olson-Johns joined Calgary skip Cheryl Bernard as her new second. After the newly revamped team failed to qualify for the playoffs at the 2012 Alberta Scotties Tournament of Hearts, Bernard decided to drop Olson-Johns from the team, due to her living in Edmonton which made it difficult for the team to practice together. However two months after this decision, it was announced that Olson-Johns would remain on the team, and lead Jennifer Sadleir would be replaced by Shannon Aleksic, following off-ice issues. The team failed to reach the provincial championship, losing out in the last chance event. Despite this, they stuck together for the 2013–14 season, in hopes of reaching the Olympic games. They began the season well, winning the Good Times Bonspiel on the World Curling Tour. Entering the 2013 Canadian Olympic Curling Pre-Trials, they were ranked fourth. The team lost their first two games in the triple knockout event before winning three straight sudden death matches to qualify for the playoffs. They faced Val Sweeting in the playoff game to advance to the qualifier, which they lost, ending their chances of reaching the games. They ended their season at the 2014 Alberta Scotties Tournament of Hearts, where they would lose to the Sweeting rink in the final. After the season, Bernard announced her retirement from competitive curling.

=== 2014–2018 ===
Without a team for the new Olympic quadrennial, Olson-Johns considered taking a year off from curling before she got a call from the Sweeting rink in November asking if she would like to join their team as third. Team Sweeting had a successful first few events, making it to the semifinals at two slams and the quarterfinals at another. They also won the 2014 Canada Cup of Curling, defeating Homan in the final. The team would also win the 2015 Alberta Scotties Tournament of Hearts, earning the team a berth at the 2015 Scotties Tournament of Hearts. There, Alberta finished the round robin in second place with a 9–2 record, behind Team Manitoba, skipped by Jennifer Jones. They would go on to lose to Manitoba in the 1 vs. 2 game, but rebounded in the semifinal, beating Saskatchewan (skipped by Stefanie Lawton), before losing to Jones again in the final.

The team found less success in their next season. They won just one tour event (the 2015 HDF Insurance Shoot-Out), though they still made the playoffs in five of the six slams of the season, including making it to the finals of the 2015 Masters, where they lost to Homan. The team would not represent Alberta at the Scotties, as they lost in the finals of the 2016 Alberta Scotties Tournament of Hearts to the Chelsea Carey rink, who would end up winning the national title.

In the 2016–17 season, the Sweeting rink made the playoffs in five of the six slams, including winning the 2016 Tour Challenge and losing in the final of the 2017 Players' Championship. The team's success throughout the slam circuit earned them the Rogers Grand Slam Cup and the $75,000 bonus. The team again lost in the finals of the 2017 Alberta Scotties Tournament of Hearts, this time losing to Shannon Kleibrink. The next season, Team Sweeting defended their title by winning the 2017 GSOC Tour Challenge. The Sweeting rink also played in the 2017 Canadian Olympic Curling Trials, going 4–4, just missing the playoffs. Team Sweeting then turned their attention to the 2018 Alberta Scotties Tournament of Hearts, where she lost in the 3 vs. 4 game. After the season, the Sweeting rink announced they would be splitting up.

=== 2018–present ===
For the 2018–19 season, Olson-Johns joined a new team skipped by Laura Walker with Cathy Overton-Clapham at third and Laine Peters at lead. They played in four of seven slam events, qualifying in three of them. At the 2019 Alberta Scotties Tournament of Hearts, they were knocked out in the C Final 9–2 by Jodi Marthaller. She did however get to play in the 2019 Champions Cup as second for Jennifer Jones, replacing Jocelyn Peterman who was competing at the 2019 World Mixed Doubles Curling Championship. They made the quarterfinals, where they lost to Rachel Homan.

== Personal life ==
As of 2018, she was married and has two children. She is a Physical Education teacher at Bellerose Composite High School in St. Albert, Canada.
