= Masters (curling) =

Annual Grand Slam of Curling event

- Established: 2002
- 2026 host city: Medicine Hat, Alberta
- 2026 arena: Co-op Place
- Men's purse: CAD $175,000
- Women's purse: CAD $175,000

Current champions (2026)
- Men: (Manitoba) Matt Dunstone
- Women: (Sweden) Isabella Wranå

Current edition
- 2026 GSOC Masters

The Masters is a Grand Slam event on the men's and women's curling tour. It is the first Grand Slam event and first major on the tour.

The event is one of the original men's Grand Slams, which began on the World Curling Tour in the 2001–02 season. It was re-named the World Cup of Curling from 2009 to 2011. In 2011, it amalgamated with the women's Sun Life Classic, which added a women's event to the Masters. The first incarnation of the event with both men and women was held in 2012 at the Wayne Gretzky Sports Centre and the Brantford Golf & Country Club in Brantford, Ontario.

A "Tier 2" event was added in September 2025.

The event is currently sponsored by AMJ Campbell, a moving company.

== Previous event names ==
=== Sun Life Classic ===
- Grandview Chain and Cable Cashspiel (2005)
- Tim Hortons Invitational Classic (2006)
- McDonald's Invitational (men's) / Sun Life Invitational (women's) (2007)
- SunLife Financial Invitational Classic (2008)
- Sun Life Classic (2009–2011)

=== Masters/World Cup ===
- Kia Masters of Curling: 2002
- M&M Meat Shops Masters of Curling: 2003–2004
- Masters of Curling: Feb. 2006
- Home Hardware Masters of Curling: Dec. 2006-Jan. 2008
- Masters of Curling: Nov. 2008
- Grey Power World Cup of Curling: 2009–2010
- GP Car and Home World Cup of Curling: 2011
- Rogers Masters of Curling: 2012
- Masters of Curling: 2013–15
- WFG Masters: 2016
- Masters of Curling: 2017
- Canadian Beef Masters: 2018
- Masters: 2019–2021
- WFG Masters: 2022–2025 (January)
- AMJ Masters: 2025 (September)
- P&H Masters: 2026

== Past champions ==
=== Masters/World Cup ===
==== Men (Tier 1) ====
Year	Winning team	Runner-up team	Location	Purse
2002	(Saskatchewan) Bruce Korte, Darrell McKee, Roger Korte, Rory Golanowski	(Manitoba) Jeff Stoughton, Jon Mead, Garry Van Den Berghe, Doug Armstrong	Gander, Newfoundland and Labrador	$100,000
2003 (Jan.)	(Alberta) Kevin Martin, Don Walchuk, Carter Rycroft, Don Bartlett	(Manitoba) Vic Peters, Mark Olson, Chris Neufeld, Steve Gould	Sudbury, Ontario	$100,000
2003 (Dec.)	(Ontario) Wayne Middaugh, Graeme McCarrel, Joe Frans, Scott Bailey	(Manitoba) Jeff Stoughton, Jon Mead, Garry Van Den Berghe, Steve Gould	Sudbury, Ontario	$100,000
2004	(Manitoba) Jeff Stoughton, Jon Mead, Garry Van Den Berghe, Steve Gould	(Saskatchewan) Pat Simmons, Jeff Sharp, Chris Haichert, Ben Hebert	Humboldt, Saskatchewan	$100,000
2006 (Feb.)	(Alberta) David Nedohin, Randy Ferbey (skip), Scott Pfeifer, Marcel Rocque	(Alberta) Kevin Martin, Don Walchuk, Carter Rycroft, Don Bartlett	St. John's, Newfoundland and Labrador	$100,000
2006 (Dec.)	(Ontario) Glenn Howard, Richard Hart, Brent Laing, Craig Savill	(Alberta) David Nedohin, Randy Ferbey (skip), Scott Pfeifer, Marcel Rocque	Waterloo, Ontario	$100,000
2008 (Jan.)	(Ontario) Glenn Howard, Richard Hart, Brent Laing, Craig Savill	(Alberta) Blake MacDonald, Kevin Koe (skip), Carter Rycroft, Nolan Thiessen	Saskatoon, Saskatchewan	$100,000
2008 (Nov.)	(Ontario) Glenn Howard, Richard Hart, Brent Laing, Craig Savill	(Alberta) Blake MacDonald, Kevin Koe (skip), Carter Rycroft, Nolan Thiessen	Waterloo, Ontario	$100,000
2009	(Ontario) Glenn Howard, Richard Hart, Brent Laing, Craig Savill	(Alberta) Kevin Koe, Blake MacDonald, Carter Rycroft, Nolan Thiessen	Mississauga, Ontario	$100,000
2010	(Manitoba) Mike McEwen, B. J. Neufeld, Matt Wozniak, Denni Neufeld	(Manitoba) Jeff Stoughton, Jon Mead,^{1} Reid Carruthers, Steve Gould	Windsor, Ontario	$100,000
2011	(Ontario) Glenn Howard, Wayne Middaugh, Brent Laing, Craig Savill	(Ontario) John Epping, Scott Bailey, Scott Howard, David Mathers	Sault Ste. Marie, Ontario	$100,000
2012	(Alberta) Kevin Koe, Pat Simmons, Carter Rycroft, Nolan Thiessen	(British Columbia) Jim Cotter, Jason Gunnlaugson, Tyrel Griffith, Rick Sawatsky	Brantford, Ontario	$100,000
2013	(Ontario) Glenn Howard, Wayne Middaugh, Brent Laing, Craig Savill	(Alberta) Kevin Martin, David Nedohin, Marc Kennedy, Ben Hebert	Abbotsford, British Columbia	$100,000
2014	(Newfoundland and Labrador) Brad Gushue, Mark Nichols, Brett Gallant, Geoff Walker	(Manitoba) Mike McEwen, B. J. Neufeld, Matt Wozniak, Denni Neufeld	Selkirk, Manitoba	$100,000
2015	(Manitoba) Mike McEwen, B. J. Neufeld, Matt Wozniak, Denni Neufeld	(British Columbia) Jim Cotter, Ryan Kuhn, Tyrel Griffith, Rick Sawatsky	Truro, Nova Scotia	$100,000
2016	(Sweden) Niklas Edin, Oskar Eriksson, Rasmus Wranå, Christoffer Sundgren	(Ontario) Brad Jacobs, Ryan Fry, E. J. Harnden, Ryan Harnden	Okotoks, Alberta	$125,000
2017	(Newfoundland and Labrador) Brad Gushue, Mark Nichols, Brett Gallant, Geoff Walker	(Sweden) Niklas Edin, Oskar Eriksson, Rasmus Wranå, Christoffer Sundgren	Lloydminster, Saskatchewan	$125,000
2018	(Ontario) John Epping, Mathew Camm, Brent Laing, Craig Savill	(Alberta) Kevin Koe, B. J. Neufeld, Colton Flasch, Ben Hebert	Truro, Nova Scotia	$125,000
2019	(Saskatchewan) Matt Dunstone, Braeden Moskowy, Catlin Schneider, Dustin Kidby	(Newfoundland and Labrador) Brad Gushue, Mark Nichols, Brett Gallant, Geoff Walker	North Bay, Ontario	$150,000
2020	Cancelled			
2021	(Scotland) Bruce Mouat, Grant Hardie, Bobby Lammie, Hammy McMillan Jr.	(Ontario) Brad Jacobs, Marc Kennedy, E. J. Harnden, Ryan Harnden	Oakville, Ontario	$150,000
2022	(Italy) Joël Retornaz, Amos Mosaner, Sebastiano Arman, Mattia Giovanella	(Scotland) Bruce Mouat, Grant Hardie, Bobby Lammie, Hammy McMillan Jr.	Oakville, Ontario	$150,000
2023	(Italy) Joël Retornaz, Amos Mosaner, Sebastiano Arman, Mattia Giovanella	(Scotland) Ross Whyte, Robin Brydone, Duncan McFadzean, Euan Kyle	Saskatoon, Saskatchewan	$200,000
2025 (Jan.)	(Scotland) Ross Whyte, Robin Brydone, Duncan McFadzean, Euan Kyle	(Alberta) Brad Jacobs, Marc Kennedy, Brett Gallant, Ben Hebert	Guelph, Ontario	$200,000
2025 (Sep.)	(Manitoba) Matt Dunstone, Colton Lott, E. J. Harnden, Ryan Harnden	(Scotland) Ross Whyte, Robin Brydone, Craig Waddell, Euan Kyle	London, Ontario	$175,000
2026	(Manitoba) Matt Dunstone, Colton Lott, Colton Flasch, Ryan Harnden	(Scotland) Bruce Mouat, Robin Brydone, Bobby Lammie, Hammy McMillan Jr.	Medicine Hat, Alberta	$175,000

Notes

1. Greg Balsdon subbed in for Mead in the final game.

==== Men (Tier 2) ====
Year	Winning team	Runner-up team	Location	Purse
2025 (Sep.)	(United States) Daniel Casper, Luc Violette, Ben Richardson, Aidan Oldenburg, Rich Ruohonen	(Alberta) Kevin Koe, Aaron Sluchinski, Tyler Tardi, Karrick Martin	London, Ontario	$60,000

==== Women (Tier 1) ====
Year	Winning team	Runner-up team	Location	Purse
2012	(Ontario) Rachel Homan, Emma Miskew, Alison Kreviazuk, Lisa Weagle	(Manitoba) Chelsea Carey, Kristy McDonald, Kristen Foster, Lindsay Titheridge	Brantford, Ontario	$50,000
2013	(Ontario) Rachel Homan, Emma Miskew, Alison Kreviazuk, Lisa Weagle	(Scotland) Eve Muirhead, Anna Sloan, Vicki Adams, Claire Hamilton	Abbotsford, British Columbia	$100,000
2014	(Alberta) Val Sweeting, Cathy Overton-Clapham, Dana Ferguson, Rachelle Brown	(Sweden) Maria Prytz, Christina Bertrup, Maria Wennerström, Margaretha Sigfridsson (skip)	Selkirk, Manitoba	$100,000
2015	(Ontario) Rachel Homan, Emma Miskew, Joanne Courtney, Lisa Weagle	(Alberta) Val Sweeting, Lori Olson-Johns, Dana Ferguson, Rachelle Brown	Truro, Nova Scotia	$100,000
2016	(Ontario) Allison Flaxey, Clancy Grandy, Lynn Kreviazuk, Morgan Court	(Ontario) Rachel Homan, Emma Miskew, Joanne Courtney, Lisa Weagle	Okotoks, Alberta	$125,000
2017	(Manitoba) Jennifer Jones, Kaitlyn Lawes, Jill Officer, Dawn McEwen	(Manitoba) Kerri Einarson, Selena Kaatz, Liz Fyfe, Kristin MacCuish	Lloydminster, Saskatchewan	$125,000
2018	(Sweden) Anna Hasselborg, Sara McManus, Agnes Knochenhauer, Sofia Mabergs	(Ontario) Rachel Homan, Emma Miskew, Joanne Courtney, Lisa Weagle	Truro, Nova Scotia	$125,000
2019	(Manitoba) Tracy Fleury, Selena Njegovan, Liz Fyfe, Kristin MacCuish	(Japan) Sayaka Yoshimura, Kaho Onodera, Anna Ohmiya, Yumie Funayama	North Bay, Ontario	$150,000
2020	Cancelled			
2021	(Manitoba) Tracy Fleury, Selena Njegovan, Liz Fyfe, Kristin MacCuish	(Manitoba) Jennifer Jones, Kaitlyn Lawes, Jocelyn Peterman, Dawn McEwen, Lisa Weagle	Oakville, Ontario	$150,000
2022	(Manitoba) Kerri Einarson, Val Sweeting, Shannon Birchard, Briane Harris	(Ontario) Rachel Homan, Tracy Fleury (skip), Emma Miskew, Sarah Wilkes	Oakville, Ontario	$150,000
2023	(Ontario) Rachel Homan, Tracy Fleury, Emma Miskew, Sarah Wilkes	(Switzerland) Alina Pätz, Silvana Tirinzoni (skip), Selina Witschonke, Carole Howald	Saskatoon, Saskatchewan	$200,000
2025 (Jan.)	(Sweden) Anna Hasselborg, Sara McManus, Agnes Knochenhauer, Sofia Mabergs	(Ontario) Rachel Homan, Tracy Fleury, Emma Miskew, Sarah Wilkes	Guelph, Ontario	$200,000
2025 (Sep.)	(Ontario) Rachel Homan, Tracy Fleury, Emma Miskew, Sarah Wilkes	(Switzerland) Alina Pätz, Silvana Tirinzoni (skip), Carole Howald, Selina Witschonke	London, Ontario	$175,000
2026	(Sweden) Isabella Wranå, Almida de Val, Moa Dryburgh, Maria Larsson	(Japan) Miku Nihira, Momoha Tabata, Sae Yamamoto, Mikoto Nakajima	Medicine Hat, Alberta	$175,000

==== Women (Tier 2) ====
Year	Winning team	Runner-up team	Location	Purse
2025 (Sep.)	(Japan) Ikue Kitazawa, Seina Nakajima, Minori Suzuki, Hasumi Ishigooka	(Scotland) Rebecca Morrison, Jennifer Dodds, Sophie Sinclair, Sophie Jackson (skip)	London, Ontario	$60,000

=== Sun Life Classic ===
The Sun Life Classic was an annual WCT event (but not a Grand Slam event) held every November at the Paris Curling Club, Brant Curling Club and the Brantford Golf & Country Club in the Brantford, Ontario area.

Past champions are listed as follows:

==== Men ====
Year	Winning skip	Runner-up skip	Purse
2005	(Ontario) Kirk Ziola	(Ontario) Jim Lyle	
2006	(Quebec) Dwayne Fowler	(Newfoundland and Labrador) Brad Gushue	35,000
2007	(Ontario) Glenn Howard	(Ontario) Kirk Ziola	53,000
2008	(Ontario) Glenn Howard	(Quebec) Jean-Michel Ménard	47,000
2009	(Manitoba) Mike McEwen	(Quebec) Martin Ferland	50,000
2010	(Manitoba) Mike McEwen	(Newfoundland and Labrador) Brad Gushue	50,000
2011	(Sweden) Niklas Edin	(Switzerland) Sven Michel	50,000

==== Women ====
Year	Winning skip	Runner-up skip	Purse
2007	(Ontario) Julie Hastings	(Ontario) Krista McCarville	32,000
2008	(Quebec) Marie-France Larouche	(Ontario) Jacqueline Harrison	47,000
2009	(Ontario) Jo-Ann Rizzo	(Alberta) Shannon Kleibrink	50,000
2010	(Manitoba) Jennifer Jones	(British Columbia) Kelly Scott	50,000
2011	(Ontario) Sherry Middaugh	(Wisconsin) Erika Brown	50,000
