= 2010 Sun Life Classic =

2010 Sun Life Financial Invitational Curling Classic
- Host city: Brantford & Paris, Ontario
- Arena: Brant Curling Club, Brantford Golf and Country Club & Paris Curling Club
- Dates: Nov. 19-22
- Men's winner: Team McEwen
- Curling club: Assiniboine Memorial CC, Winnipeg, Manitoba
- Skip: Mike McEwen
- Third: B. J. Neufeld
- Second: Matt Wozniak
- Lead: Denny Neufeld
- Finalist: Team Gusuhue
- Women's winner: Team Jennifer Jones
- Curling club: St. Vital CC, Winnipeg, Manitoba
- Skip: Jennifer Jones
- Third: Kaitlyn Lawes
- Second: Jill Officer
- Lead: Dawn Askin
- Finalist: Team Kelly Scott

The 2010 Sun Life Financial Invitational Curling Classic was held November 19–22 at the Brantford Golf and Country Club and Brant Curling Club in Brantford, Ontario and the Paris Curling Club in Paris, Ontario. It was held on Week 11 of the 2010-11 World Curling Tour season. The total purse for both the men's and women's events was CAD$50,000.

Jennifer Jones won the women's event over rival Kelly Scott in the final, 6–4. Mike McEwen won the men's event, beating Randy Ferbey 7–5 in the final.

== Men's ==
=== Teams ===
- (Ontario) Greg Balsdon
- (Ontario) Jonathan Beuk
- (Ontario) Mark Bice
- (Ontario) Peter Corner
- (Ontario) John Epping
- (United States) Pete Fenson
- (Quebec) Martin Ferland
- (Ontario) Darcy Garbedian
- (United States) Tyler George
- (Ontario) Gerry Geurts
- (Newfoundland and Labrador) Brad Gushue
- (Ontario) Mike Harris
- (Ontario) Jake Higgs
- (Ontario) Glenn Howard
- (Ontario) Brad Jacobs
- (Ontario) Mike Jakubo
- (Ontario) Mark Kean
- (Ontario) Rob Lobel
- (Ontario) Dale Matchett
- (United States) Heath McCormick
- (Manitoba) Mike McEwen
- (Quebec) Jean-Michel Ménard
- (Ontario) Wayne Middaugh
- (Ontario) Matt Paul
- (Ontario) Howard Rajala
- (Ontario) Nick Rizzo
- (Ontario) Brendan Taylor
- (Ontario) Wayne Tuck, Jr.

=== Playoffs ===
Quarterfinals
(Ontario) Epping	2
(Newfoundland and Labrador) Gushue	8
(Ontario) Middaugh	3
(Ontario) Bice	7
(Ontario) Jacobs	6
(Ontario) Kean	7
(Manitoba) McEwen	5
(Quebec) Ferland	1

Semifinals
(Newfoundland and Labrador) Gushue	7
(Ontario) Bice	1
(Ontario) Kean	2
(Manitoba) McEwen	5

Finals
(Newfoundland and Labrador) Gushue	5
(Manitoba) McEwen	7

== Women's ==
=== Teams ===
- (Ontario) Cathy Auld
- (Ontario) Denna Bagshaw
- (Quebec) Ève Bélisle
- (Prince Edward Island) Suzanne Birt
- (United States) Erika Brown
- (Ontario) Kathy Brown
- (Ontario) Chrissy Cadorin
- (Ontario) Alison Goring
- (Ontario) Jacqueline Harrison
- (Ontario) Julie Hastings
- (Saskatchewan) Amber Holland
- (Ontario) Rachel Homan
- (Ontario) Tracy Horgan
- (Manitoba) Jennifer Jones
- (United States) Patti Lank
- (Quebec) Marie-France Larouche
- (Ontario) Carrie Lindner
- (Ontario) Colleen Madonia
- (Ontario) Lauren Mann
- (Ontario) Heather Marshall
- (Ontario) Krista McCarville
- (Ontario) Sherry Middaugh
- (Newfoundland and Labrador) Shelley Nichols
- (Ontario) Brit O'Neill
- (Manitoba) Cathy Overton-Clapham
- (United States) Allison Pottinger
- (Manitoba) Brette Richards
- (British Columbia) Kelly Scott
- (Saskatchewan) Robyn Silvernagle
- (Newfoundland and Labrador) Heather Strong
- (Ontario) Kirsten Wall

=== Playoffs ===
Quarterfinals
(Ontario) Middaugh	3
(Ontario) Wall	9
(Saskatchewan) Holland	2
(Manitoba) Jones	7
(British Columbia) Scott	7
(Ontario) Horgan	6
(Ontario) McCarville	5
(Ontario) Homan	4

Semifinals
(Ontario) Wall	3
(Manitoba) Jones	7
(British Columbia) Scott	6
(Ontario) McCarville	5

Finals
(Manitoba) Jones	6
(British Columbia) Scott	4
