= 2011 Sun Life Classic =

2011 Sun Life Financial Invitational Curling Classic
- Host city: Brantford & Paris, Ontario
- Arena: Brant Curling Club; Brantford Golf and Country Club; Paris Curling Club
- Dates: Nov. 17–21
- Men's winner: (Sweden) Niklas Edin
- Curling club: Karlstads CK, Karlstad
- Skip: Niklas Edin
- Third: Sebastian Kraupp
- Second: Fredrik Lindberg
- Lead: Viktor Kjäll
- Finalist: (Switzerland) Sven Michel
- Women's winner: (Ontario) Sherry Middaugh
- Curling club: Coldwater & District CC, Coldwater
- Skip: Sherry Middaugh
- Third: Jo-Ann Rizzo
- Second: Lee Merklinger
- Lead: Leigh Armstrong
- Finalist: (Wisconsin) Erika Brown

The 2011 Sun Life Financial Invitational Curling Classic was held from November 17 to 21 at the Brantford Golf and Country Club and Brant Curling Club in Brantford, Ontario and the Paris Curling Club in Paris, Ontario. It was held during Week 12 of the 2011–12 World Curling Tour season. The total purse for both the men's and women's events was CAD$50,000.

== Men ==
=== Teams ===
Skip	Third	Second	Lead	Locale
Chad Allen	Travis Fanset	Jay Allen	Jim Clayton	Brantford, Ontario
Greg Balsdon	Chris Ciasnocha	Tyler Morgan	Jamie Farnell	Kingston, Ontario
Mark Bice	Codey Maus	Steve Bice	Jamie Danbrook	Sarnia, Ontario
Robert Brewer	Al Belec	Dusty Jakomait	Greg McLellan	Sault Ste. Marie, Ontario
Matthew Camm	Peter Steski	Andrew Hamilton	Ed Cyr	Ottawa, Ontario
Peter Corner	Graeme McCarrel	Joe Frans	Darryl Prebble	Brampton, Ontario
Benoit Schwarz (fourth)	Peter de Cruz (skip)	Gilles Vuille	Valentin Tanner	Switzerland
Matt Dumontelle	Jordan Chandler	Kyle Chandler	Gavan Jamieson	Sudbury, Ontario
Niklas Edin	Sebastian Kraupp	Fredrik Lindberg	Viktor Kjäll	Karlstad, Sweden
John Epping	Scott Bailey	Scott Howard	David Mathers	Toronto, Ontario
Michael Fournier	Dwayne Fowler	Simon Lejour	Yannick Lejour	Montreal, Quebec
Tyler George	Chris Plys	Rich Ruohonen	Aanders Brorson	Duluth, Minnesota
Brad Gushue	Ryan Fry	Geoff Walker	Adam Casey	St. John's, Newfoundland and Labrador
David Hamblin	Kevin Hambin	Kyle Einarson	Mike Neufeld	Morris, Manitoba
Mike Harris	Jim Wilson	Scott Foster	Ken McDermott	Oakville, Ontario
Brent Ross (fourth)	Jake Higgs (skip)	Jonathan Beuk	Bill Buchanan	Harriston, Ontario
Glenn Howard	Wayne Middaugh	Brent Laing	Craig Savill	Coldwater, Ontario
Brad Jacobs	E. J. Harnden	Ryan Harnden	Scott Seabrook	Sault Ste. Marie, Ontario
Mark Kean	Andrew Clayton	Patrick Janssen	Tim March	Toronto, Ontario
Kevin Koe	Pat Simmons	Carter Rycroft	Nolan Thiessen	Edmonton, Alberta
Kevin Martin	John Morris	Marc Kennedy	Ben Hebert	Edmonton, Alberta
Dale Matchett	Ryan Werenich	Jeff Gorda	Shawn Kaufman	Bradford, Ontario
Heath McCormick	Bill Stopera	Martin Sather	Dean Gemmell	(New York (state)) New York City, New York
Mike McEwen	B. J. Neufeld	Matt Wozniak	Denni Neufeld	Winnipeg, Manitoba
Jean-Michel Ménard	Martin Crête	Éric Sylvain	Philippe Ménard	Gatineau/Lévis, Quebec
Sven Michel	Claudio Pätz	Sandro Trolliet	Simon Gempeler	Adelboden, Switzerland
Braeden Moskowy	Kirk Muyres	D.J. Kidby	Dustin Kidby	Regina, Saskatchewan
Dan Petryk (fourth)	Steve Petryk (skip)	Colin Hodgson	Brad Chyz	Calgary, Alberta
Greg Richardson	Paul Winford	Dan Baird	Craig Simms	Ottawa, Ontario
Robert Rumfeldt	Adam Spencer	Scott Hodgson	Greg Robinson	Guelph, Ontario
Rasmus Stjerne	Johnny Frederiksen	Mikkel Poulsen	Troels Harry	Hvidovre, Denmark
Wayne Tuck, Jr.	Craig Kochan	Scott McDonald	Paul Moffatt	Toronto, Ontario

=== Knockout results ===
==== A event ====
First Knockout
(Manitoba) Mike McEwen	7
(Manitoba) David Hamblin	4
(Alberta) Steve Petryk	5
(Ontario) Peter Corner	0
(Ontario) John Epping	6
(Ontario) Mike Harris	8
(Switzerland) Peter de Cruz	7
(Newfoundland and Labrador) Brad Gushue	4
(Sweden) Niklas Edin	6
(Ontario) Greg Richardson	1
(Switzerland) Sven Michel	9
(Ontario) Dale Matchette	4
(Saskatchewan) Braeden Moskowy	6
(Quebec) Jean-Michel Ménard	7
(New York (state)) Heath McCormick	11
(Alberta) Kevin Koe	8

Quarterfinals
(Manitoba) Mike McEwen	7
(Alberta) Steve Petryk	1
(Ontario) Mike Harris	3
(Switzerland) Peter de Cruz	5
(Sweden) Niklas Edin	1
(Switzerland) Sven Michel	6
(Quebec) Jean-Michel Ménard	5
(New York (state)) Heath McCormick	7

Semifinals
(Manitoba) Mike McEwen	3
(Switzerland) Peter de Cruz	6
(Switzerland) Sven Michel	8
(New York (state)) Heath McCormick	2

Qualifier 1
(Switzerland) Peter de Cruz	2
(Switzerland) Sven Michel	8

First Knockout
(Ontario) Glenn Howard	6
(Ontario) Robert Brewer	2
(Minnesota) Tyler George	4
(Ontario) Matt Dumontelle	2
(Ontario) Mark Kean	5
(Ontario) Matthew Camm	3
(Denmark) Rasmus Stjerne	7
(Ontario) Brad Jacobs	5
(Ontario) Wayne Tuck, Jr.	1
(Ontario) Robert Rumfeldt	8
(Ontario) Jake Higgs	8
(Ontario) Chad Allen	3
(Ontario) Greg Balsdon	0
(Ontario) Mark Bice	6
(Quebec) Michael Fournier	3
(Alberta) Kevin Martin	8

Quarterfinals
(Ontario) Glenn Howard	8
(Minnesota) Tyler George	7
(Ontario) Mark Kean	6
(Denmark) Rasmus Stjerne	9
(Ontario) Robert Rumfeldt	4
(Ontario) Jake Higgs	10
(Ontario) Mark Bice	4
(Alberta) Kevin Martin	3

Semifinals
(Ontario) Glenn Howard	5
(Denmark) Rasmus Stjerne	7
' (Ontario) Jake Higgs	6
(Ontario) Mark Bice	3

Qualifier 2
(Denmark) Rasmus Stjerne	8
(Ontario) Jake Higgs	3

==== B event ====
Second Knockout
(Manitoba) David Hamblin	7
(Ontario) Peter Corner	6
(Ontario) John Epping	8
(Newfoundland and Labrador) Brad Gushue	3

Quarterfinals
(Sweden) Niklas Edin	8
(Manitoba) David Hamblin	1
(Quebec) Jean-Michel Ménard	7
(Ontario) John Epping	10

Semifinals
(Ontario) Glenn Howard	6
(Sweden) Niklas Edin	3
(Ontario) Mark Bice	6
(Ontario) John Epping	9

To Qualifier 3
(Ontario) Glenn Howard	6
(Ontario) John Epping	3

Second Knockout
(Ontario) Greg Richardson	7
(Ontario) Dale Matchette	5
(Saskatchewan) Braeden Moskowy	0
(Alberta) Kevin Koe	7

Quarterfinals
(Minnesota) Tyler George	7
(Ontario) Greg Richardson	2
(Ontario) Mark Kean	4
(Alberta) Kevin Koe	7

Semifinals
(Minnesota) Tyler George	3
(Alberta) Kevin Koe	9

To Qualifier 3
(Switzerland) Peter de Cruz	2
(Alberta) Kevin Koe	8
Qualifier 3
(Ontario) Glenn Howard	4
(Alberta) Kevin Koe	2

Second Knockout
(Ontario) Robert Brewer	8
(Ontario) Matt Dumontelle	4
(Ontario) Matthew Camm	3
(Ontario) Brad Jacobs	6

Quarterfinals
(Ontario) Robert Rumfeldt	6
(Ontario) Robert Brewer	1
(Alberta) Kevin Martin	3
(Ontario) Brad Jacobs	0

Semifinals
(Manitoba) Mike McEwen	7
(Ontario) Robert Rumfeldt	2
(New York (state)) Heath McCormick	3
(Alberta) Kevin Martin	6

To Qualifier 4
(Manitoba) Mike McEwen	7
(Alberta) Kevin Martin	1

Second Knockout
(Ontario) Wayne Tuck, Jr.	5
(Ontario) Chad Allen	4
(Ontario) Greg Balsdon	9
(Quebec) Michael Fournier	2

Quarterfinals
(Alberta) Steve Petryk	7
(Ontario) Wayne Tuck, Jr.	2
(Ontario) Mike Harris	4
(Ontario) Greg Balsdon	8

Semifinals
(Alberta) Steve Petryk	1
(Ontario) Greg Balsdon	7

To Qualifier 4
(Ontario) Jake Higgs	4
(Ontario) Greg Balsdon	6
Qualifier 4
(Manitoba) Mike McEwen	8
(Ontario) Greg Balsdon	2

==== C event ====
Third Knockout
(Ontario) Peter Corner	5
(Newfoundland and Labrador) Brad Gushue	6
(Ontario) Brad Jacobs	7
(Ontario) Robert Brewer	2

Quarterfinals
(New York (state)) Heath McCormick	4
(Newfoundland and Labrador) Brad Gushue	6
(Alberta) Steve Petryk	2
(Ontario) Brad Jacobs	7

Semifinals
(Newfoundland and Labrador) Brad Gushue	4
(Ontario) Brad Jacobs	8

Qualifier 5
(Alberta) Kevin Koe	5
(Ontario) Brad Jacobs	2

Third Knockout
(Ontario) Dale Matchette	5
(Saskatchewan) Braeden Moskowy	6

Quarterfinals
(Ontario) Mike Harris	4
(Ontario) Wayne Tuck, Jr.	6
(Sweden) Niklas Edin	8
(Saskatchewan) Braeden Moskowy	6

Semifinals
(Switzerland) Peter de Cruz	6
(Ontario) Wayne Tuck, Jr.	2
(Alberta) Kevin Martin	3
(Sweden) Niklas Edin	5

Qualifier 6
(Switzerland) Peter de Cruz	5
(Sweden) Niklas Edin	6

Third Knockout
(Quebec) Michael Fournier	6
(Ontario) Chad Allen	5
(Quebec) Jean-Michel Ménard	5
(Manitoba) David Hamblin	4

Quarterfinals
(Minnesota) Tyler George	7
(Quebec) Michael Fournier	6
(Ontario) Robert Rumfeldt	5
(Quebec) Jean-Michel Ménard	3

Semifinals
(Minnesota) Tyler George	1
(Ontario) Robert Rumfeldt	8

Qualifier 7
(Ontario) Greg Balsdon	9
(Ontario) Robert Rumfeldt	4

Third Knockout
(Ontario) Matthew Camm	3
(Ontario) Matt Dumontelle	4

Quarterfinals
(Ontario) Mark Kean	7
(Ontario) Greg Richardson	3
(Ontario) Mark Bice	8
(Ontario) Matt Dumontelle	3

Semifinals
(Ontario) John Epping	7
(Ontario) Mark Kean	8
(Ontario) Jake Higgs	7
(Ontario) Mark Bice	3

Qualifier 8
(Ontario) Mark Kean	9
(Ontario) Jake Higgs	6

=== Playoffs ===
Quarterfinal
(Switzerland) Sven Michel	8
(Ontario) Mark Kean	2
(Manitoba) Mike McEwen	6
(Alberta) Kevin Koe	3
(Ontario) Glenn Howard	3
(Sweden) Niklas Edin	5
(Denmark) Rasmus Stjerne	6
(Ontario) Greg Balsdon	2

Semifinal
(Switzerland) Sven Michel	6
(Manitoba) Mike McEwen	5
(Sweden) Niklas Edin	5
(Denmark) Rasmus Stjerne	3

Final
(Switzerland) Sven Michel	2
(Sweden) Niklas Edin	7

== Women ==
=== Teams ===
Skip	Third	Second	Lead	Locale
Cathy Auld	Janet Murphy	Stephanie Gray	Melissa Foster	Mississauga, Ontario
Cheryl Bernard	Susan O'Connor	Lori Olson-Johns	Jennifer Sadleir	Calgary, Alberta
Suzanne Birt	Shelly Bradley	Robyn MacPhee	Leslie MacDougall	Charlottetown, Prince Edward Island
Leslie Bishop	Stephanie LeDrew	Courtney Davies	Kate Hamer	Sarnia, Ontario
Erika Brown	Debbie McCormick	Ann Swisshelm	Jessica Schultz	Madison, Wisconsin
Chrissy Cadorin	Brit O'Neill	Jenn Minchin	Jasmine Thurston	Glendale, Ontario
Chelsea Carey	Kristy McDonald	Kristen Foster	Lindsay Titheridge	Morden, Manitoba
Laura Crocker	Sarah Wilkes	Jen Gates	Clancy Grandy	Waterloo, Ontario
Lisa Farnell	Erin Morrissey	Kim Brown	Ainsley Galbraith	Chaffeys Locks, Ontario
Julie Hastings	Christy Trombley	Stacey Smith	Katrina Collins	Thornhill, Ontario
Amber Holland	Kim Schneider	Tammy Schneider	Heather Kalenchuk	Kronau, Saskatchewan
Jennifer Jones	Kaitlyn Lawes	Joëlle Sabourin	Dawn Askin	Winnipeg, Manitoba
Andrea Kelly	Rebecca Atkinson	Jillian Babin	Jodie de Solla	Oromocto, New Brunswick
Shannon Kleibrink	Amy Nixon	Bronwen Webster	Chelsey Matson	Calgary, Alberta
Patti Lank	Nina Spatola	Caitlin Maroldo	Mackenzie Lank	(New York (state)) Lewiston, New York
Marie-France Larouche	Brenda Nicholls	Amélie Blais	Anne-Marie Filteau	Lévis, Quebec
Stefanie Lawton	Sherry Anderson	Sherri Singler	Marliese Kasner	Saskatoon, Saskatchewan
Jackie Lockhart	Karen Kennedy	Kay Adams	Sarah Macintyre	Edinburgh, Scotland
Krista McCarville	Ashley Miharija	Liz Armstrong	Sarah Lang	Thunder Bay, Ontario
Sherry Middaugh	Jo-Ann Rizzo	Lee Merklinger	Leigh Armstrong	Coldwater, Ontario
Eve Muirhead	Anna Sloan	Vicki Adams	Claire Hamilton	Perth, Scotland
Heather Nedohin	Beth Iskiw	Jessica Mair	Laine Peters	Edmonton, Alberta
Allison Nimik	Lori Eddy	Kimberly Tuck	Julie Columbus	Elmvale, Ontario
Cathy Overton-Clapham	Jenna Loder	Ashley Howard	Breanne Meakin	Winnipeg, Manitoba
Cassandra Potter	Jamie Haskell	Jackie Lemke	Steph Sambor	St. Paul, Minnesota
Allison Pottinger	Nicole Joraanstad	Natalie Nicholson	Tabitha Peterson	St. Paul, Minnesota
Julie Reddick	Carrie Lindner	Megan Balsdon	Laura Hickey	Toronto, Ontario
Kelly Scott	Dailene Sivertson	Sasha Carter	Jacquie Armstrong	Kelowna, British Columbia
Robyn Silvernagle	Kelsey Dutton	Dayna Demmans	Cristina Goertzen	Meadow Lake, Saskatchewan
Heather Smith-Dacey	Danielle Parsons	Blisse Comstock	Teri Lake	Halifax, Nova Scotia
Heather Strong	Laura Strong	Jen Cunningham	Stephanie Corab	(Newfoundland and Labrador) St. John's, Newfoundland
Kirsten Wall	Hollie Nicol	Danielle Inglis	Jill Mouzar	Toronto, Ontario

=== Knockout results ===
==== A event ====
First Knockout
(Manitoba) Jennifer Jones	2
(Newfoundland and Labrador) Heather Strong	7
(Ontario) Lisa Farnell	6
(Ontario) Cathy Auld	3
(Manitoba) Cathy Overton-Clapham	4
(Scotland) Jackie Lockhart	6
(Ontario) Leslie Bishop	0
(Scotland) Eve Muirhead	7
(Manitoba) Chelsea Carey	7
(Ontario) Chrissy Cadorin	6
(Minnesota) Allison Pottinger	7
(British Columbia) Kelly Scott	6
(Ontario) Kirsten Wall	8
(Ontario) Laura Crocker	4
(Minnesota) Cassandra Potter	9
(Saskatchewan) Stefanie Lawton	5

Quarterfinals
(Newfoundland and Labrador) Heather Strong	7
(Ontario) Lisa Farnell	6
(Scotland) Jackie Lockhart	2
(Scotland) Eve Muirhead	7
(Manitoba) Chelsea Carey	4
(Minnesota) Allison Pottinger	2
(Ontario) Kirsten Wall	7
(Minnesota) Cassandra Potter	3

Semifinals
(Newfoundland and Labrador) Heather Strong	1
(Scotland) Eve Muirhead	8
(Manitoba) Chelsea Carey	5
(Ontario) Kirsten Wall	3

Qualifier 1
(Scotland) Eve Muirhead	5
(Manitoba) Chelsea Carey	4

First Knockout
(Saskatchewan) Amber Holland	4
(Saskatchewan) Robyn Silvernagle	6
(New York (state)) Patti Lank	5
(Ontario) Allison Nimik	8
(Ontario) Krista McCarville	9
(Wisconsin) Erika Brown	8
(Ontario) Julie Reddick	3
(Alberta) Heather Nedohin	4
(Ontario) Sherry Middaugh	5
(Quebec) Marie-France Larouche	4
(Nova Scotia) Heather Smith-Dacey	4
(Alberta) Cheryl Bernard	7
(Ontario) Julie Hastings	11
(Prince Edward Island) Suzanne Birt	3
(New Brunswick) Andrea Kelly	2
(Alberta) Shannon Kleibrink	8

Quarterfinals
(Saskatchewan) Robyn Silvernagle	4
(Ontario) Allison Nimik	5
(Ontario) Krista McCarville	4
(Alberta) Heather Nedohin	2
(Ontario) Sherry Middaugh	7
(Alberta) Cheryl Bernard	5
(Ontario) Julie Hastings	6
(Alberta) Shannon Kleibrink	5

Semifinals
(Ontario) Allison Nimik	2
(Ontario) Krista McCarville	8
(Ontario) Sherry Middaugh	6
(Ontario) Julie Hastings	2

Qualifier 2
(Ontario) Krista McCarville	7
(Ontario) Sherry Middaugh	8

==== B event ====
Second Knockout
(Manitoba) Jennifer Jones	6
(Ontario) Cathy Auld	2
(Manitoba) Cathy Overton-Clapham	2
(Ontario) Leslie Bishop	8

Quarterfinals
(Minnesota) Allison Pottinger	2
(Manitoba) Jennifer Jones	8
(Minnesota) Cassandra Potter	2
(Ontario) Leslie Bishop	8

Semifinals
(Ontario) Allison Nimik	1
(Manitoba) Jennifer Jones	6
(Ontario) Julie Hastings	7
(Ontario) Leslie Bishop	10

To Qualifier 3
(Manitoba) Jennifer Jones	8
(Ontario) Leslie Bishop	2

Second Knockout
(Ontario) Chrissy Cadorin	3
(British Columbia) Kelly Scott	6
(Ontario) Laura Crocker	7
(Saskatchewan) Stefanie Lawton	6

Quarterfinals
(Saskatchewan) Robyn Silvernagle	5
(British Columbia) Kelly Scott	2
(Alberta) Heather Nedohin	9
(Ontario) Laura Crocker	3

Semifinals
(Saskatchewan) Robyn Silvernagle	4
(Alberta) Heather Nedohin	9

To Qualifier 3
(Manitoba) Chelsea Carey	5
(Alberta) Heather Nedohin	3
Qualifier 3
(Manitoba) Jennifer Jones	7
(Manitoba) Chelsea Carey	2

Second Knockout
(Saskatchewan) Amber Holland	6
(New York (state)) Patti Lank	3
(Wisconsin) Erika Brown	8
(Ontario) Julie Reddick	1

Quarterfinals
(Alberta) Cheryl Bernard	6
(Saskatchewan) Amber Holland	4
(Alberta) Shannon Kleibrink	3
(Wisconsin) Erika Brown	5

Semifinals
(Newfoundland and Labrador) Heather Strong	5
(Alberta) Cheryl Bernard	4
(Ontario) Kirsten Wall	5
(Wisconsin) Erika Brown	7

To Qualifier 4
(Newfoundland and Labrador) Heather Strong	1
(Wisconsin) Erika Brown	9

Second Knockout
(Quebec) Marie-France Larouche	1
(Nova Scotia) Heather Smith-Dacey	4
(Prince Edward Island) Suzanne Birt	4
(New Brunswick) Andrea Kelly	11

Quarterfinals
(Ontario) Lisa Farnell	1
(Nova Scotia) Heather Smith-Dacey	7
(Scotland) Jackie Lockhart	6
(New Brunswick) Andrea Kelly	3

Semifinals
(Nova Scotia) Heather Smith-Dacey	4
(Scotland) Jackie Lockhart	6

To Qualifier 4
(Ontario) Krista McCarville	9
(Scotland) Jackie Lockhart	4
Qualifier 4
(Wisconsin) Erika Brown	5
(Ontario) Krista McCarville	6

==== C event ====
Third Knockout
(Manitoba) Cathy Overton-Clapham	6
(Ontario) Cathy Auld	4
(Alberta) Shannon Kleibrink	10
(Saskatchewan) Amber Holland	9

Quarterfinals
(Ontario) Kirsten Wall	5
(Manitoba) Cathy Overton-Clapham	4
(Nova Scotia) Heather Smith-Dacey	6
(Alberta) Shannon Kleibrink	4

Semifinals
(Ontario) Kirsten Wall	5
(Nova Scotia) Heather Smith-Dacey	8

Qualifier 5
(Manitoba) Chelsea Carey	5
(Nova Scotia) Heather Smith-Dacey	7

Third Knockout
(Ontario) Chrissy Cadorin	6
(Saskatchewan) Stefanie Lawton	5

Quarterfinals
(New Brunswick) Andrea Kelly	3
(Ontario) Lisa Farnell	4
(Ontario) Allison Nimik	8
(Ontario) Chrissy Cadorin	5

Semifinals
(Alberta) Heather Nedohin	7
(Ontario) Lisa Farnell	5
(Ontario) Leslie Bishop	0
(Ontario) Allison Nimik	7

Qualifier 6
(Alberta) Heather Nedohin	3
(Ontario) Allison Nimik	6

Third Knockout
(Prince Edward Island) Suzanne Birt	6
(Quebec) Marie-France Larouche	2
(Minnesota) Allison Pottinger	4
(Minnesota) Cassandra Potter	7

Quarterfinals
(Saskatchewan) Robyn Silvernagle	2
(Prince Edward Island) Suzanne Birt	8
(Alberta) Cheryl Bernard	4
(Minnesota) Cassandra Potter	7

Semifinals
(Prince Edward Island) Suzanne Birt	7
(Minnesota) Cassandra Potter	2

Qualifier 7
(Wisconsin) Erika Brown	7
(Prince Edward Island) Suzanne Birt	1

Third Knockout
(New York (state)) Patti Lank	7
(Ontario) Julie Reddick	2

Quarterfinals
(British Columbia) Kelly Scott	5
(Ontario) Laura Crocker	7
(Ontario) Julie Hastings	5
(New York (state)) Patti Lank	8

Semifinals
(Newfoundland and Labrador) Heather Strong	6
(Ontario) Laura Crocker	7
(Scotland) Jackie Lockhart	5
(New York (state)) Patti Lank	6

Qualifier 8
(Ontario) Laura Crocker	7
(New York (state)) Patti Lank	6

=== Playoffs ===
Quarterfinal
(Scotland) Eve Muirhead	2
(Wisconsin) Erika Brown	8
(Ontario) Krista McCarville	3
(Nova Scotia) Heather Smith-Dacey	4
(Manitoba) Jennifer Jones	7
(Ontario) Allison Nimik	2
(Ontario) Sherry Middaugh	7
(Ontario) Laura Crocker	3

Semifinal
(Wisconsin) Erika Brown	6
(Nova Scotia) Heather Smith-Dacey	5
(Manitoba) Jennifer Jones	4
(Ontario) Sherry Middaugh	8

Final
(Wisconsin) Erika Brown	3
(Ontario) Sherry Middaugh	8
