= 2010–11 curling season =

- Sport: Curling

Seasons
- ← 2009–10 2011–12 →

The 2010–11 curling season began in September 2010 and ended in April 2011.

Note: In events with two genders, the men's tournament winners will be listed before the women's tournament winners.

== CCA-sanctioned events ==
Season of Champions events in bold; other CCA-sanctioned events in regular typeface.

Event	Winning skip	Runner-up skip
Canadian Mixed Curling Championship; Morris, Manitoba, Nov. 13-20	Prince Edward Island	Manitoba
The Dominion Curling Club Championship; Charlottetown, Prince Edward Island, Nov. 23-28	Saskatchewan	Ontario
The Dominion Curling Club Championship; Charlottetown, Prince Edward Island, Nov. 23-28	Alberta	Saskatchewan
**Canada Cup of Curling**; Medicine Hat, Alberta, Dec. 1-5	(Ontario) Glenn Howard	(Alberta) Kevin Martin
**Canada Cup of Curling**; Medicine Hat, Alberta, Dec. 1-5	(Saskatchewan) Stefanie Lawton	(Alberta) Cheryl Bernard
**Continental Cup of Curling**; St. Albert, Alberta, Jan. 13-16	(Canada) (United States) North America	(United Nations) World
Universiade; Erzurum, Turkey, Jan. 27-Feb. 6	South Korea	Switzerland
Universiade; Erzurum, Turkey, Jan. 27-Feb. 6	Great Britain	Russia
**Canadian Junior Curling Championships**; Calgary, Alberta, Jan. 29-Feb. 6	Saskatchewan	Ontario
**Canadian Junior Curling Championships**; Calgary, Alberta, Jan. 29-Feb. 6	(Saskatchewan) Trish Paulsen	(Alberta) Nadine Chyz
Canada Winter Games; Halifax, Nova Scotia, Feb. 13-26	Ontario	Saskatchewan
Canada Winter Games; Halifax, Nova Scotia, Feb. 13-26	British Columbia	Alberta
**Tournament of Hearts**; Charlottetown, Prince Edward Island, Feb. 19-27	Saskatchewan	Canada
World Wheelchair Curling Championship; Prague, Czech Republic, Feb. 21-Mar.1	Canada	Scotland
**Tim Hortons Brier**; London, Ontario, Mar. 5-13	Manitoba	Ontario
World Junior Curling Championships; Perth, Scotland, Mar. 5-13	Sweden	Switzerland
World Junior Curling Championships; Perth, Scotland, Mar. 5-13	Scotland	Canada
CIS/CCA University Championships; St. John's, Newfoundland and Labrador, Mar. 9-13	(Newfoundland and Labrador) Memorial Sea-Hawks	Manitoba Bisons
CIS/CCA University Championships; St. John's, Newfoundland and Labrador, Mar. 9-13	(Ontario) Laurier Golden Hawks	(Ontario) Brock Badgers
Canadian Senior Curling Championships; Digby, Nova Scotia, Mar. 19-26	Manitoba	Alberta
Canadian Senior Curling Championships; Digby, Nova Scotia, Mar. 19-26	New Brunswick	Ontario
World Women's Curling Championship; Esbjerg, Denmark, Mar. 19-27	Sweden	Canada
Canadian Wheelchair Curling Championship; Edmonton, Alberta, Mar. 20-27	Manitoba	Alberta
Canadian Masters Curling Championships; Winnipeg, Manitoba, Mar. 30-Apr. 5	British Columbia	Manitoba
Canadian Masters Curling Championships; Winnipeg, Manitoba, Mar. 30-Apr. 5	Manitoba	British Columbia
**World Men's Curling Championship**; Regina, Saskatchewan, Apr. 2-10	Canada	Scotland
World Mixed Doubles Curling Championship; St. Paul, Minnesota, Apr. 15-24	Switzerland	Russia
World Senior Curling Championships; St. Paul, Minnesota, Apr. 15-24	Canada	United States
World Senior Curling Championships; St. Paul, Minnesota, Apr. 15-24	Canada	Sweden

== Other events ==
Event	Winning skip		Runner-up skip
European Mixed Curling Championship; Howwood, Scotland, September 20–28	Scotland		Switzerland
World Wheelchair Curling Championship Qualification; Lohja, Finland, Nov. 7-12	China		Russia
Pacific Curling Championships; Uiseong, South Korea, Nov. 16-23	China		South Korea
Pacific Curling Championships; Uiseong, South Korea, Nov. 16-23	South Korea		China
European Curling Championships; Champéry, Switzerland, Dec. 3-11	A	Norway	Denmark
European Curling Championships; Champéry, Switzerland, Dec. 3-11	A	Sweden	Scotland
European Curling Championships; Champéry, Switzerland, Dec. 3-11	B	Italy	Latvia
European Curling Championships; Champéry, Switzerland, Dec. 3-11	B	Czech Republic	Italy
European Junior Curling Challenge; Prague, Czech Republic, Jan. 3-8	Czech Republic		Russia
European Junior Curling Challenge; Prague, Czech Republic, Jan. 3-8	Norway		Germany
Pacific Junior Curling Championships; Naseby, New Zealand, Jan. 9-16	China		South Korea
Pacific Junior Curling Championships; Naseby, New Zealand, Jan. 9-16	Japan		South Korea
TSN Curling Skins Game; Rama, Ontario, Jan. 22-23	(Alberta) Kevin Martin		(Scotland) David Murdoch
Karuizawa International Curling Championship; Karuizawa, Nagano, Japan, Jan. 26-30	(Japan) Yusuke Morozumi		(United States) Tyler George
Karuizawa International Curling Championship; Karuizawa, Nagano, Japan, Jan. 26-30	(Canada) Jennifer Jones		(Japan) Satsuki Fujisawa
Winter Deaflympics; Vysoké Tatry, Slovakia, Feb. 19-26	Event cancelled		

== World Curling Tour ==
Grand Slam events in bold.

=== Men's events ===
Week	Event	Winning skip	Runner-up skip
1	Baden Masters; Baden, Switzerland, September 10–12	(Switzerland) Thomas Lips	(Newfoundland and Labrador) Brad Gushue
2	AMJ Campbell Shorty Jenkins Classic; Brockville, Ontario, September 16–19	(Quebec) Jean-Michel Ménard	(Ontario) Brad Jacobs
2	The Shoot-Out; Edmonton, September 16–19	(Alberta) Don Walchuk	(Alberta) Ted Appelman
3	Radisson Blu Oslo Cup; Oslo, September 23–26	(Sweden) Niklas Edin	(Norway) Thomas Ulsrud
3	World Financial Group Classic; Calgary, September 24–27	(Alberta) Dean Ross	(Alberta) Don Walchuk
4	Swiss Cup Basel; Basel, Oct. 1-4	(Germany) Andy Kapp	(Switzerland) Christof Schwaller
4	Horizon Laser Vision Center Classic; Regina, Saskatchewan, Oct. 1-4	(Saskatchewan) Randy Bryden	(Saskatchewan) Carl deConinck Smith
4	Twin Anchors Invitational; Vernon, British Columbia, Oct. 1-4	(Alberta) Kevin Koe	(Russia) Andrey Drozdov
5	Manitoba Lotteries Men's Fall Classic; Brandon, Manitoba, Oct. 8-11	(Saskatchewan) Scott Bitz	(Manitoba) Vic Peters
5	Westcoast Curling Classic; New Westminster, British Columbia, Oct. 8-11	(Alberta) Kevin Martin	(Alberta) Kevin Koe
6	St. Paul Cash Spiel; St. Paul, Minnesota, Oct. 15-17	(Minnesota) Tyler George	(Ontario) Bryan Burgess
6	Meyers Norris Penny Charity Classic; Medicine Hat, Alberta, Oct. 15-18	(Saskatchewan) Pat Simmons	(Alberta) Ted Appelman
7	Challenge Casino Lac Leamy; Gatineau, Quebec, Oct. 21-24	(Quebec) Serge Reid	(Quebec) Jean-Michel Ménard
7	Bern Open; Bern, Switzerland, Oct. 22-24	(Switzerland) Thomas Lips	(Scotland) Hammy McMillan
7	Canad Inns Prairie Classic; Portage la Prairie, Manitoba, Oct. 22-25	(Manitoba) Mike McEwen	(Manitoba) Jeff Stoughton
8	Cactus Pheasant Classic; Brooks, Alberta, Oct. 28-31	(Alberta) Kevin Martin	(Ontario) Wayne Middaugh
9	**Grey Power World Cup of Curling**; Windsor, Ontario, Nov. 3-7	(Manitoba) Mike McEwen	(Manitoba) Jeff Stoughton
9	Red Deer Curling Classic; Red Deer, Alberta, Nov. 5-8	(British Columbia) Jason Montgomery	(Alberta) Brent Bawel
10	Whites Drug Store Classic; Swan River, Manitoba, Nov. 11-14	(Alberta) Kevin Martin	(Saskatchewan) Darrell McKee
10	Lucerne Curling Trophy; Lucerne, Switzerland, Nov. 11-14	(Germany) Andy Kapp	(Scotland) Tom Brewster
11	Skookum WCT Cash Spiel; Whitehorse, Yukon, Nov. 18-21	(Alberta) Kevin Koe	(British Columbia) Greg McAulay
11	Wainwright Roaming Buffalo Classic; Wainwright, Alberta, Nov. 19-22	(Alberta) Robert Schlender	(Alberta) Jamie Fletcher
11	Interlake Pharmacy Classic; Stonewall, Manitoba, Nov. 19-22	(Manitoba) Reid Carruthers	(Manitoba) David Bohn
11	Sun Life Classic; Brantford, Ontario, Nov. 19-22	(Manitoba) Mike McEwen	(Newfoundland and Labrador) Brad Gushue
12	Challenge Casino de Charlevoix; Clermont, Quebec, Nov. 25-28	(Manitoba) Mike McEwen	(Quebec) Serge Reid
12	Seattle Cash Spiel; Seattle, Washington, Nov. 26-28	(Alberta) Brad Hannah	(Washington (state)) Leon Romaniuk
12	Edinburgh International; Edinburgh, Scotland, Nov. 26-28	(Scotland) Graham Shaw	(Scotland) Hammy McMillan
12	Labatt Crown of Curling; Kamloops, British Columbia, Nov. 26-29	(British Columbia) Bob Ursel	(Alberta) Steve Petryk
12	Point Optical Curling Classic; Saskatoon, Saskatchewan, Nov. 26-29	(Manitoba) Dave Elias	(Saskatchewan) Randy Bryden
13	Dauphin Clinic Pharmacy Classic; Dauphin, Manitoba, Dec. 3-6	(Manitoba) Rae Kujanpaa	(Saskatchewan) Brent Gedak
13	Laphroaig Scotch Open; Madison, Wisconsin, Dec. 3-5	(Minnesota) Todd Birr	(Wisconsin) Matt Hamilton
15	**The Swiss Chalet National**; Vernon, British Columbia, Dec. 15-19	(Alberta) Kevin Martin	(Manitoba) Jeff Stoughton
15	Curl Mesabi Cash Spiel; Eveleth, Minnesota, Dec. 17-19	(Ontario) Jeff Currie	(Minnesota) John Benton
17	Ramada Perth Masters; Perth, Scotland, Jan. 6-9	(Manitoba) Mike McEwen	(Scotland) Duncan Fernie
19	**BDO Canadian Open of Curling**; Oshawa, Ontario, Jan. 26-30	(Manitoba) Mike McEwen	(Ontario) Glenn Howard
27	DEKALB Superspiel; Morris, Manitoba, Mar. 17-21	(Alberta) Kevin Koe	(Manitoba) Mike McEwen
29	Victoria Curling Classic Invitational; Victoria, British Columbia, Mar. 31-Apr. 3	(Ontario) Glenn Howard	(Alberta) Brock Virtue
30	**GP Car and Home Players' Championship**; Grande Prairie, Alberta, Apr. 12-18	(Alberta) Kevin Martin	(Sweden) Niklas Edin

=== Women's events ===
Week	Event	Winning skip	Runner-up skip
2	AMJ Campbell Shorty Jenkins Classic; Brockville, Ontario, September 16–19	(Ontario) Rachel Homan	(Ontario) Tracy Horgan
2	The Shoot-Out; Edmonton, September 16–19	(Alberta) Heather Nedohin	(Alberta) Cathy King
3	Radisson SAS Oslo Cup; Oslo, September 23–26	(Switzerland) Mirjam Ott	(Sweden) Anna Hasselborg
3	Schmirler Curling Classic; Regina, Saskatchewan, September 24–27	(Saskatchewan) Amber Holland	(Ontario) Sherry Middaugh
4	Twin Anchors Invitational; Vernon, British Columbia, September 30-Oct. 3	(Alberta) Cheryl Bernard	(Russia) Liudmila Privivkova
5	RE/MAX Masters Basel; Basel, Switzerland, Oct. 8-10	(Germany) Andrea Schöpp	(Sweden) Anna Hasselborg
5	**Curlers Corner Autumn Gold Curling Classic**; Calgary, Oct. 8-11	(China) Wang Bingyu	(Alberta) Desirée Owen
6	Meyers Norris Penny Charity Classic; Medicine Hat, Alberta, Oct. 15-18	(Alberta) Jessie Kaufman	(Scotland) Eve Muirhead
7	Grasshopper Women's Masters; Zürich, Switzerland, Oct. 22-24	(Switzerland) Mirjam Ott	(Russia) Liudmila Privivkova
7	**Manitoba Lotteries Women's Curling Classic**; Winnipeg, Manitoba, Oct. 22-25	(Manitoba) Chelsea Carey	(Manitoba) Cathy Overton-Clapham
8	Colonial Square Ladies Classic; Saskatoon, Oct. 29-Nov. 1	(Saskatchewan) Stefanie Lawton	(Manitoba) Jennifer Jones
9	Royal LePage OVCA Women's Fall Classic; Kemptville, Ontario, Nov. 4-7	(Ontario) Christine McCrady	(Ontario) Tracy Horgan
9	Stockholm Ladies Cup; Stockholm, Sweden, Nov. 4-7	(Switzerland) Mirjam Ott	(Sweden) Anna Hasselborg
9	Red Deer Curling Classic; Red Deer, Alberta, Nov. 5-8	(Alberta) Shannon Kleibrink	(Alberta) Jessie Kaufman
10	**Sobeys Slam**; New Glasgow, Nova Scotia, Nov. 11-14	(Manitoba) Jennifer Jones	(Manitoba) Chelsea Carey
11	Interlake Pharmacy Classic; Stonewall, Manitoba, Nov. 19-22	(Manitoba) Shauna Streich	(Manitoba) Jill Thurston
11	Sun Life Classic; Brantford, Ontario, Nov. 19-22	(Manitoba) Jennifer Jones	(British Columbia) Kelly Scott
12	Labatt Crown of Curling; Kamloops, British Columbia, Nov. 26-29	(British Columbia) Allison MacInnes	(British Columbia) Marla Mallett
12	Boundary Ford Curling Classic; Lloydminster, Alberta, Nov. 26-29	(Alberta) Shannon Kleibrink	(Alberta) Heather Nedohin
12	International ZO Women's Tournament; Wetzikon, Switzerland, Nov. 26-28	(Switzerland) Mirjam Ott	(Switzerland) Binia Feltscher
17	International Bernese Ladies Cup; Bern, Switzerland, Jan. 14-16	(Denmark) Lene Nielsen	(Japan) Shinobu Aota
18	Glynhill Ladies International; Glasgow, Scotland, Jan. 21-23	(Sweden) Anna Hasselborg	(Switzerland) Mirjam Ott
27	DEKALB Superspiel; Morris, Manitoba, Mar. 17-21	(Manitoba) Chelsea Carey	(Manitoba) Michelle Montford
29	Victoria Curling Classic Invitational; Victoria, British Columbia, Mar. 31-Apr. 3	(Manitoba) Jennifer Jones	(Alberta) Shannon Kleibrink
30	**GP Car and Home Players' Championship**; Grande Prairie, Alberta, Apr. 12-18	(Manitoba) Jennifer Jones	(Ontario) Rachel Homan

== WCT Order of Merit rankings ==
Men

Year-end Standings
#	Skip	Points
1	(Alberta) Kevin Martin	540.090
2	(Ontario) Glenn Howard	458.120
3	(Manitoba) Mike McEwen	388.030
4	(Alberta) Kevin Koe	386.160
5	(Manitoba) Jeff Stoughton	342.128
6	(Newfoundland and Labrador) Brad Gushue	338.762
7	(Norway) Thomas Ulsrud	325.530
8	(Sweden) Niklas Edin	290.370
9	(British Columbia) Bob Ursel	212.830
10	(Ontario) Dale Matchett	182.180

Women

Year-end Standings
#	Skip	Points
1	(Manitoba) Jennifer Jones	481.075
2	(Saskatchewan) Amber Holland	326.000
3	(Alberta) Cheryl Bernard	314.060
4	(Alberta) Shannon Kleibrink	288.520
5	(Switzerland) Mirjam Ott	253.310
6	(Saskatchewan) Stefanie Lawton	243.951
7	(British Columbia) Kelly Scott	226.610
8	(Alberta) Heather Nedohin	213.821
9	(Scotland) Eve Muirhead	210.513
10	(China) Wang Bingyu	196.760

== WCT Money List ==
Men

Year-end Standings
#	Skip	$ (CAD)
1	(Manitoba) Mike McEwen	127,490
2	(Alberta) Kevin Martin	125,500
3	(Ontario) Glenn Howard	85,900
4	(Alberta) Kevin Koe	84,000
5	(Manitoba) Jeff Stoughton	75,250
6	(Saskatchewan) Pat Simmons	51,800
7	(Sweden) Niklas Edin	47,727
8	(Manitoba) Rob Fowler	41,750
9	(British Columbia) Bob Ursel	34,250
10	(Newfoundland and Labrador) Brad Gushue	33,348

Women

Year-end Standings
#	Skip	$ (CAD)
1	(Manitoba) Jennifer Jones	76,069
2	(Manitoba) Chelsea Carey	43,000
3	(Alberta) Heather Nedohin	40,100
4	(Switzerland) Mirjam Ott	36,282
5	(Alberta) Shannon Kleibrink	34,400
6	(Saskatchewan) Stefanie Lawton	29,200
7	(Scotland) Eve Muirhead	27,338
8	(Ontario) Rachel Homan	27,300
9	(Alberta) Desirée Owen	24,400
10	(Alberta) Jessie Kaufman	23,900

== Cyber attack on curling websites ==
On January 14, 2011, four major curling websites (CurlingZone, World Curling Tour, Ontario Curling Tour, and Canadian Curling Reporters) went offline in an apparent cyber attack by hackers from China and Korea. The problem was found to be missing databases of painstakingly documented curling information dating back two years from primary and secondary backup systems. For many weeks, the four websites and any content supported by CurlingZone's software were unable to be accessed. The proprietors of the websites were forced to request the help of data recovery services to recover the lost data, which includes information on thousands of curling events both major, like the Olympics season, and minor. As a result of these presumed cyber attacks, the websites were switched to a new server and reloaded with whatever information was available at the time.

Capital One, the sponsor of the Grand Slam of Curling, the World Curling Championships, and various teams and bonspiels, stated a few days after the incident that they would match donations to CurlingZone to help the recovery effort and encouraged other curling-related businesses to donate money. However, people involved with CurlingZone and The Curling News expressed concern that much of the data is irrecoverable and may have disappeared forever. As of March, the websites are up and running, but the content from last year and many years preceding it are still missing.

In another event, the websites of U.S. and world curling governing bodies were attacked by sites in China and Korea. The attacks may be related to the attacks on the four major curling websites.

== The Dominion MA Cup ==
The Dominion MA Cup presented by TSN was created for the first time for the 2010-11 season. The Cup is awarded to the Canadian Curling Association Member Association (MA) who has had the most success during the season in the CCA sanctioned events. Events include the Canadian Mixed, Men's & Women's Juniors, the Scotties, the Brier, Men's & Women's Seniors and the national Wheelchair championship.

The inaugural title will go to both Alberta and Saskatchewan. Both MAs finished with the highest number of points, in a tie. The tie breaking procedure is the best record between the two MAs in round robin games, but the two MAs split their season series 4-4.

Alberta did not win any national titles; it was runner up in three events, and finished in the top six in all events. Saskatchewan, on the other hand, won both junior events and the Scotties. Manitoba finished third, having also won three events (the Brier, the men's seniors, the national wheelchairs).

The Governors Cup was also awarded, to the Member Association who has seen the most improvement. It was given to New Brunswick.

Points are awarded based on placement in each of the events, with the top association receiving 14 points, then the second place team with 13, etc.

=== Final standings ===
Rank	Member Association	CMCC	CWJCC	CMJCC	Scotties	Brier	CWSCC	CMSCC	CWhCC	Total Pts.	Avg. Pts
T1	Alberta	9	13	9	8	11	11	13	13	87	10.875
T1	Saskatchewan	7	14	14	14	7	12	11	8	87	10.875
3	Manitoba	13	12	8	6	14	4	14	14	85	10.625
4	Ontario	11	6	13	11	13	13	9	6	82	10.250
5	Nova Scotia	12	4	10	12	9	10	7	12	76	9.500
6	New Brunswick	10	9	11	4	6	14	3	n/a	57	8.143
7	British Columbia	8	11	3	10	8	8	6	11	65	8.125
8	Northern Ontario	6	8	7	n/a	10	7	8	10	56	8.000
9	Prince Edward Island	14	10	5	9	3	9	5	n/a	55	7.857
10	Newfoundland and Labrador	3	5	12	3	12	6	12	5	58	7.250
11	Quebec	4	3	2	7	5	3	10	7	41	5.125
12	Northwest Territories	5	2	4	5	4	5	2	n/a	27	3.857
13	Yukon	2	7	6	2	2	2	4	n/a	25	3.571
14	Nunavut	n/a	n/a	n/a	n/a	n/a	n/a	n/a	n/a	0	0.000

== Capital One Cup ==
The Capital One Cup is a season-long competition that awards curling teams point values for their participation in Capital One Grand Slam of Curling events. At the end of the season, the men's and women's teams with the top three point values are awarded purse totalling CAD$170,000. The top-ranked team is awarded $50,000, the second-ranked team $25,000, and the third-ranked team $10,000.

The points are allocated as follows:

Rank	Point Value	
Rank	GPWC, National, BDO Autumn, Manitoba, Sobeys	GPPC
1st	12 points	24 points
2nd	9 points	18 points
3rd/4th	7 points	14 points
5th-8th	5 points	10 points
Qualifying	1 point per win	2 points per win

Men

#	Team	GPWC	National	BDO	GPPC	Total
1	(Alberta) Kevin Martin	5	12	5	24	46
2	(Manitoba) Mike McEwen	12	5	12	10	39
3	(Ontario) Glenn Howard	7	7	9	14	37
4	(Manitoba) Jeff Stoughton	9	9	7	10	35
5	(Sweden) Niklas Edin	5	5	–	18	28
5	(Alberta) Kevin Koe	5	2	7	14	28
6	(Manitoba) Rob Fowler	7	–	5	10	22
7	(Ontario) Wayne Middaugh	3	7	2	–	12
7	(Saskatchewan) Pat Simmons	3	2	5	2	12
8	(Saskatchewan) Braeden Moskowy	–	–	–	10	10
9	(Newfoundland and Labrador) Randy Ferbey (Gushue)	5	2	1	–	8
9	(British Columbia) Bob Ursel	2	5	1	–	8
10	(Ontario) John Epping	–	2	2	2	6
10	(Ontario) Brad Jacobs	2	–	–	4	6
10	(Alberta) Don Walchuk	–	5	1	–	6
11	(Ontario) Dale Matchett	–	–	5	–	5
11	(Norway) Thomas Ulsrud	3	–	2	–	5
12	(Ontario) Jake Higgs	2	–	2	–	4
12	(Alberta) Steve Petryk	–	–	–	4	4
12	(Alberta) Robert Schlender	–	–	–	4	4
13	(Manitoba) Kevin Park	2	1	–	–	3
14	(Ontario) Mathew Camm	–	–	–	2	2
14	(Ontario) Peter Corner	–	–	2	–	2
14	(British Columbia) Sean Geall	–	2	–	–	2
14	(British Columbia) Jason Montgomery	–	2	–	–	2
15	(Alberta) Brent Bawel	–	1	–	0	1
16	(Alberta) Brock Virtue	–	–	–	0	0

Women

#	Team	Autumn	Manitoba	Sobeys	GPPC	Total
1	(Manitoba) Jennifer Jones	7	5	12	24	48
2	(Manitoba) Chelsea Carey	2	12	9	10	33
3	(Alberta) Heather Nedohin	7	7	–	14	28
4	(Scotland) Eve Muirhead	3	–	7	14	24
5	(Ontario) Rachel Homan	–	1	2	18	21
6	(Alberta) Cheryl Bernard	5	4	–	10	19
6	(Alberta) Desirée Owen	9	–	–	10	19
6	(Saskatchewan) Stefanie Lawton	5	7	5	2	19
7	(Manitoba) Cathy Overton-Clapham	2	9	7	0	18
8	(Alberta) Shannon Kleibrink	5	–	–	10	15
9	(China) Wang Bingyu	12	2	–	–	14
10	(Saskatchewan) Amber Holland	4	4	5	–	13
11	(United States) Erika Brown	3	4	5	–	12
12	(Ontario) Sherry Middaugh	–	5	3	2	10
13	(Alberta) Valerie Sweeting	4	–	4	–	8
13	(Sweden) Stina Viktorsson	–	4	–	4	8
14	(Alberta) Crystal Webster	3	–	–	4	7
15	(Saskatchewan) Michelle Englot	4	2	–	–	6
15	(British Columbia) Kelly Scott	1	5	–	–	6
16	(Manitoba) Kelly Einarson	–	3	2	–	5
16	(Prince Edward Island) Kathy O'Rourke	–	–	5	–	5
16	(Alberta) Heather Rankin	5	–	–	–	5
16	(Alberta) Renee Sonnenberg	–	5	–	–	5
17	(Ontario) Jacqueline Harrison	–	–	4	–	4
17	(Switzerland) Mirjam Ott	–	–	–	4	4
17	(United States) Allison Pottinger	3	1	–	–	4
17	(Alberta) Casey Scheidegger	4	–	–	–	4
18	(Alberta) Lisa Eyamie	–	3	–	–	3
18	(Nova Scotia) Colleen Jones	–	1	2	–	3
18	(Saskatchewan) Cindy Ricci	1	–	2	–	3
18	(Manitoba) Barb Spencer	–	3	–	–	3
18	(Newfoundland and Labrador) Heather Strong	–	–	3	–	3
18	(Ontario) Kirsten Wall	–	–	3	–	3
19	(Manitoba) Lisa Blixhavn	–	2	–	–	2
19	(Nova Scotia) Marie Christianson	–	–	2	–	2
19	(Saskatchewan) Chantell Eberle	–	2	–	–	2
19	(Manitoba) Karen Fallis	–	2	–	–	2
19	(Manitoba) Kerri Flett	2	–	–	–	2
19	(Alberta) Jessie Kaufman	–	–	–	2	2
19	(Manitoba) Karen Harvey	–	2	–	–	2
19	(New Brunswick) Andrea Kelly	2	–	–	–	2
19	(United States) Patti Lank	–	1	1	–	2
19	(Newfoundland and Labrador) Shelley Nichols	–	–	2	–	2
19	(Nova Scotia) Sarah Rhyno	–	–	2	–	2
19	(Manitoba) Jill Thurston	–	2	–	–	2
19	(Alberta) Faye White	2	–	–	–	2
20	(Alberta) June Campbell	1	–	–	–	1
20	(Northwest Territories) Kerry Galusha	1	–	–	–	1
20	(Manitoba) Deb McCreanor	–	1	–	–	1
20	(Nova Scotia) Colleen Pinkney	–	–	1	–	1
20	(Russia) Liudmila Privivkova	1	–	–	–	1
20	(Alberta) Bobbie Sauder	1	–	–	–	1
20	(Manitoba) Holly Scott	–	1	–	–	1
20	(British Columbia) Adina Tasaka	1	–	–	–	1

== Notable team changes ==
=== Retirements ===
- **Richard Hart**, longtime third for Glenn Howard, retired from high-performance curling due to considerations regarding his career. Hart was the 1998 Olympic silver medallist as third under Mike Harris, and the 2007 Brier winner and 2007 World Champion as third under Howard. He also was the six-time Ontario provincial champion with Howard and won eight Grand Slams with Howard.
- (Alberta) **Blake MacDonald**, longtime third and fourth for Kevin Koe, retired from high-performance curling due to his work schedule and family commitments. MacDonald was the 2010 Brier winner and 2010 World Champion with Koe, and also won the 2008 Canada Cup of Curling with Koe.
- (Prince Edward Island) **Kathy O'Rourke** retired from curling after her team announced that they would break up. O'Rourke was a former Canadian Mixed champion and has represented PEI at 6 Scotties, including the 2010 Scotties, where she and her team were the runner-up to Jennifer Jones.

=== Careers on hiatus ===
- (Newfoundland and Labrador) **Mark Nichols**, longtime third for Brad Gushue, announced that he would be taking a hiatus from high-performance curling for the 2011–12 curling season in order to spend more time with his family. Nichols was the 2006 Olympic gold medallist as third under Russ Howard and the 2007 Brier runner-up as third under Gushue.

=== Team line-up changes ===
Teams listed by skip, new teammates listed in bold

- (Alberta) Cheryl Bernard: Following the breakup of Bernard's Olympic silver medal-winning team of Susan O'Connor, Carolyn Darbyshire, and Cori Morris, Bernard and longtime third O'Connor will join new teammates **Lori Olson-Johns** and **Jennifer Sadlier** at second and lead, respectively. Darbyshire will remain as alternate, while Morris has joined another team. Bernard's new second Olson-Johns has curled with Crystal Webster and Cathy King, while new lead Sadlier is a former junior provincial champion and has experience playing in provincial championships.
- (Newfoundland and Labrador) Brad Gushue: Following Nichols' announcement of his hiatus from curling, Gushue promoted Manitoba native Ryan Fry to the third position and added **Geoff Walker** of Alberta and **Adam Casey** of PEI as his second and lead, respectively. Fry has been on the Gushue rink since the 2008–09 curling season; Walker and Casey were successful junior curlers.
- (Ontario) Glenn Howard: Following the departure of Richard Hart, former teammate **Wayne Middaugh** will take the third position in Howard's team. Middaugh is a two-time world champion and former teammate of Glenn Howard. Middaugh served as the substitute for Hart on the Howard rink during the 2010 Canada Cup of Curling, which Howard won.
- (Alberta) Kevin Koe: Following the departure of Blake MacDonald, Saskatchewan native **Pat Simmons** will replace MacDonald at the third position. Simmons has represented Saskatchewan at five Briers, including four consecutive appearances from 2005–2008.
- (Manitoba) Cathy Overton-Clapham: After one season together, lead Raunora Westcott and second Leslie Wilson have left the team. **Jenna Loder** and **Ashley Howard** have joined the team at third and second, while Breanne Meakin, who remains with Overton-Clapham, moves from third to lead.
- Serge Reid: Reid announced in a tweet that **Pierre Charette** will be joining his team as skip, throwing lead stones. Charette is a former Quebec provincial champion and Brier runner-up and is known for being the only curler to play all five positions at the Brier.
- (Alberta) Crystal Webster: Following the breakup of Kathy O'Rourke's PEI Scotties team, **Erin Carmody** and **Geri-Lynn Ramsay** announced that they would be joining forces with Webster, whose third Lori Olson-Johns had left to join the Cheryl Bernard rink. The PEI Scotties team skipped by O'Rourke, which had Carmody throwing fourth stones and Ramsay throwing third stones, finished as runner-up to the Jennifer Jones rink at the 2010 Scotties.

== See also ==
- World Curling Tour Home
- Season of Champions Home

Preceded by 2009–10	2010–11 curling season September 2010 – April 2011	Succeeded by 2011–12
