= 2015 The Masters Grand Slam of Curling =

Grand Slam of Curling event

- Host city: Truro, Nova Scotia
- Arena: Rath Eastlink Community Centre
- Dates: Oct. 27 – Nov. 1
- Men's winner: (Manitoba) Team McEwen
- Curling club: Fort Rouge CC, Winnipeg
- Skip: Mike McEwen
- Third: B. J. Neufeld
- Second: Matt Wozniak
- Lead: Denni Neufeld
- Finalist: (British Columbia) Jim Cotter
- Women's winner: (Ontario) Team Homan
- Curling club: Ottawa CC, Ottawa
- Skip: Rachel Homan
- Third: Emma Miskew
- Second: Joanne Courtney
- Lead: Lisa Weagle
- Finalist: (Alberta) Val Sweeting

The 2015 Masters Grand Slam of Curling was held from October 27 to November 1 at the Rath Eastlink Community Centre in Truro, Nova Scotia. This was the second Grand Slam Grand Slam of the 2015–16 curling season.

== Men ==
=== Teams ===
Skip	Third	Second	Lead	Locale
Shawn Adams	Mark Dacey	Craig Savill	Andrew Gibson	Halifax, Nova Scotia
Brendan Bottcher	Tom Appelman	Bradley Thiessen	Karrick Martin	Edmonton, Alberta
Reid Carruthers	Braeden Moskowy	Derek Samagalski	Colin Hodgson	West St. Paul, Manitoba
Jim Cotter	Ryan Kuhn	Tyrel Griffith	Rick Sawatsky	Kelowna/Vernon, British Columbia
Niklas Edin	Oskar Eriksson	Kristian Lindström	Christoffer Sundgren	Karlstad, Sweden
John Epping	Mathew Camm	Patrick Janssen	Tim March	Toronto, Ontario
Brad Gushue	Mark Nichols	Brett Gallant	Geoff Walker	Newfoundland and Labrador
Glenn Howard	Wayne Middaugh	Richard Hart	Scott Howard	Penetanguishene, Ontario
Brad Jacobs	Ryan Fry	E. J. Harnden	Ryan Harnden	Sault Ste. Marie, Ontario
Kevin Koe	Marc Kennedy	Brent Laing	Ben Hebert	Calgary, Alberta
Steve Laycock	Kirk Muyres	Colton Flasch	Dallan Muyres	Saskatoon, Saskatchewan
Mike McEwen	B. J. Neufeld	Matt Wozniak	Denni Neufeld	Winnipeg, Manitoba
David Murdoch	Greg Drummond	Scott Andrews	Michael Goodfellow	Stirling, Scotland
Pat Simmons	John Morris	Carter Rycroft	Nolan Thiessen	Calgary, Alberta
Thomas Ulsrud	Torger Nergård	Christoffer Svae	Håvard Vad Petersson	Oslo, Norway

=== Round-robin standings ===
Final round-robin standings

Key
Teams to Playoffs
Teams to Tiebreakers

Pool A	W	L
(Alberta) Kevin Koe	4	0
(Manitoba) Mike McEwen	3	1
(Saskatchewan) Steve Laycock	2	2
(Alberta) Pat Simmons	1	3
(Nova Scotia) Shawn Adams	0	4

Pool B	W	L
(British Columbia) Jim Cotter	3	1
(Ontario) Brad Jacobs	3	1
(Manitoba) Reid Carruthers	2	2
(Alberta) Brendan Bottcher	1	3
(Norway) Thomas Ulsrud	1	3

Pool C	W	L
(Newfoundland and Labrador) Brad Gushue	4	0
(Sweden) Niklas Edin	2	2
(Ontario) Glenn Howard	2	2
(Ontario) John Epping	1	3
(Scotland) David Murdoch	1	3

=== Round-robin results ===
All draw times are listed in Atlantic Daylight Time (UTC−3).

==== Draw 1 ====
Tuesday, October 27, 7:00 pm

Sheet C	1	2	3	4	5	6	7	8	Final
(Alberta) Pat Simmons 🔨	1	0	1	1	0	1	1	2	7
(Nova Scotia) Shawn Adams	0	2	0	0	1	0	0	0	3

Sheet D	1	2	3	4	5	6	7	8	Final
(Newfoundland and Labrador) Brad Gushue 🔨	0	1	1	0	1	1	0	X	4
(Ontario) John Epping	0	0	0	1	0	0	1	X	2

==== Draw 2 ====
Wednesday, October 28, 8:30 am

Sheet A	1	2	3	4	5	6	7	8	Final
(Ontario) Brad Jacobs 🔨	2	0	0	1	0	1	0	X	4
(Norway) Thomas Ulsrud	0	0	1	0	1	0	0	X	2

Sheet B	1	2	3	4	5	6	7	8	Final
(Alberta) Brendan Bottcher 🔨	0	0	1	0	0	2	1	1	5
(Manitoba) Reid Carruthers	0	1	0	1	2	0	0	0	4

==== Draw 3 ====
Wednesday, October 28, 12:00 pm

Sheet A	1	2	3	4	5	6	7	8	Final
(Alberta) Kevin Koe	0	1	1	0	3	0	2	3	10
(Alberta) Pat Simmons 🔨	3	0	0	1	0	1	0	0	5

Sheet C	1	2	3	4	5	6	7	8	Final
(Manitoba) Mike McEwen 🔨	0	2	2	1	0	2	X	X	7
(Saskatchewan) Steve Laycock	0	0	0	0	1	0	X	X	1

Sheet D	1	2	3	4	5	6	7	8	Final
(Ontario) Glenn Howard 🔨	1	1	0	0	0	4	0	1	7
(Scotland) David Murdoch	0	0	2	1	1	0	1	0	5

==== Draw 4 ====
Wednesday, October 28, 3:30 pm

Sheet B	1	2	3	4	5	6	7	8	Final
(Sweden) Niklas Edin	0	0	2	0	0	4	1	X	7
(Ontario) John Epping 🔨	0	1	0	0	1	0	0	X	2

Sheet D	1	2	3	4	5	6	7	8	Final
(Norway) Thomas Ulsrud 🔨	1	0	1	0	2	0	0	0	4
(British Columbia) Jim Cotter	0	2	0	2	0	0	1	3	8

==== Draw 5 ====
Wednesday, October 28, 7:00 pm

Sheet B	1	2	3	4	5	6	7	8	Final
(Newfoundland and Labrador) Brad Gushue 🔨	2	0	2	0	1	0	1	X	6
(Ontario) Glenn Howard	0	2	0	0	0	1	0	X	3

Sheet D	1	2	3	4	5	6	7	8	Final
(Manitoba) Mike McEwen	1	0	0	1	0	1	0	4	7
(Nova Scotia) Shawn Adams 🔨	0	1	1	0	1	0	1	0	4

Sheet E	1	2	3	4	5	6	7	8	9	Final
(Ontario) Brad Jacobs 🔨	0	1	0	2	0	2	0	1	0	6
(Manitoba) Reid Carruthers	0	0	1	0	2	0	3	0	1	7

==== Draw 6 ====
Thursday, October 29, 8:30 am

Sheet C	1	2	3	4	5	6	7	8	Final
(Ontario) John Epping 🔨	3	2	0	0	2	0	X	X	7
(Scotland) David Murdoch	0	0	2	0	0	1	X	X	3

==== Draw 7 ====
Thursday, October 29, 12:00 pm

Sheet A	1	2	3	4	5	6	7	8	Final
(Sweden) Niklas Edin 🔨	0	2	0	1	1	0	0	1	5
(Ontario) Glenn Howard	0	0	1	0	0	2	1	0	4

Sheet B	1	2	3	4	5	6	7	8	Final
(Manitoba) Mike McEwen 🔨	2	0	2	0	0	4	X	X	8
(Alberta) Pat Simmons	0	1	0	0	1	0	X	X	2

Sheet C	1	2	3	4	5	6	7	8	9	Final
(Alberta) Brendan Bottcher	1	0	1	0	1	0	0	1	0	4
(British Columbia) Jim Cotter 🔨	0	1	0	2	0	1	0	0	1	5

Sheet D	1	2	3	4	5	6	7	8	Final
(Alberta) Kevin Koe 🔨	1	0	2	0	2	0	0	2	7
(Saskatchewan) Steve Laycock	0	2	0	1	0	3	0	0	6

==== Draw 8 ====
Thursday, October 29, 3:30 pm

Sheet B	1	2	3	4	5	6	7	8	Final
(Manitoba) Reid Carruthers 🔨	1	0	2	0	1	0	0	3	7
(Norway) Thomas Ulsrud	0	2	0	1	0	2	1	0	6

==== Draw 9 ====
Thursday, October 29, 7:00 pm

Sheet B	1	2	3	4	5	6	7	8	Final
(Alberta) Kevin Koe 🔨	1	1	1	0	2	0	1	X	6
(Nova Scotia) Shawn Adams	0	0	0	1	0	1	0	X	2

Sheet C	1	2	3	4	5	6	7	8	Final
(Newfoundland and Labrador) Brad Gushue 🔨	0	1	0	0	2	1	2	X	6
(Sweden) Niklas Edin	0	0	1	1	0	0	0	X	2

Sheet D	1	2	3	4	5	6	7	8	Final
(Ontario) Brad Jacobs	0	0	0	2	3	0	1	X	6
(Alberta) Brendan Bottcher 🔨	0	1	0	0	0	2	0	X	3

==== Draw 10 ====
Friday, October 30, 8:30 am

Sheet A	1	2	3	4	5	6	7	8	9	Final
(Manitoba) Reid Carruthers	0	0	2	0	0	0	0	1	0	3
(British Columbia) Jim Cotter 🔨	1	1	0	0	0	1	0	0	1	4

Sheet D	1	2	3	4	5	6	7	8	Final
(Sweden) Niklas Edin	0	0	0	1	0	X	X	X	1
(Scotland) David Murdoch 🔨	2	2	1	0	1	X	X	X	6

Sheet E	1	2	3	4	5	6	7	8	9	Final
(Saskatchewan) Steve Laycock	0	1	0	2	1	0	1	0	1	6
(Nova Scotia) Shawn Adams 🔨	1	0	2	0	0	1	0	1	0	5

==== Draw 11 ====
Friday, October 30, 12:00 pm

Sheet E	1	2	3	4	5	6	7	8	Final
(Alberta) Brendan Bottcher 🔨	1	0	3	1	0	0	2	0	7
(Norway) Thomas Ulsrud	0	4	0	0	1	2	0	3	10

==== Draw 12 ====
Friday, October 30, 3:30 pm

Sheet A	1	2	3	4	5	6	7	8	Final
(Newfoundland and Labrador) Brad Gushue 🔨	0	2	0	1	0	2	2	X	7
(Scotland) David Murdoch	0	0	2	0	1	0	0	X	3

Sheet B	1	2	3	4	5	6	7	8	Final
(Ontario) Brad Jacobs 🔨	0	1	0	1	1	0	3	X	6
(British Columbia) Jim Cotter	0	0	2	0	0	1	0	X	3

Sheet C	1	2	3	4	5	6	7	8	Final
(Saskatchewan) Steve Laycock	2	0	0	3	1	1	X	X	7
(Alberta) Pat Simmons 🔨	0	0	1	0	0	0	X	X	1

Sheet D	1	2	3	4	5	6	7	8	Final
(Manitoba) Mike McEwen	0	1	0	1	0	2	0	0	4
(Alberta) Kevin Koe 🔨	1	0	1	0	1	0	1	1	5

Sheet E	1	2	3	4	5	6	7	8	Final
(Ontario) John Epping	0	1	1	1	0	1	0	X	4
(Ontario) Glenn Howard 🔨	1	0	0	0	3	0	4	X	8

=== Tiebreaker ===
Saturday, October 31, 9:00 am

Team	1	2	3	4	5	6	7	8	Final
(Saskatchewan) Steve Laycock 🔨	0	1	0	2	0	2	1	X	6
(Ontario) Glenn Howard	0	0	2	0	1	0	0	X	3

Player percentages
(Saskatchewan) Team Laycock		(Ontario) Team Howard	
Dallan Muyres	98%	Scott Howard	89%
Colton Flasch	99%	Richard Hart	88%
Kirk Muyres	100%	Wayne Middaugh	93%
Steve Laycock	90%	Glenn Howard	76%
Total	97%	Total	87%

=== Playoffs ===
Quarterfinals
1	(Newfoundland and Labrador) Brad Gushue	2
8	(Saskatchewan) Steve Laycock	5
4	(British Columbia) Jim Cotter	8
5	(Ontario) Brad Jacobs	1
2	(Alberta) Kevin Koe	7
7	(Sweden) Niklas Edin	5
3	(Manitoba) Mike McEwen	7
6	(Manitoba) Reid Carruthers	4

Semifinals
8	(Saskatchewan) Steve Laycock	3
4	(British Columbia) Jim Cotter	8
2	(Alberta) Kevin Koe	4
3	(Manitoba) Mike McEwen	5

Final
4	(British Columbia) Jim Cotter	3
3	(Manitoba) Mike McEwen	5

==== Quarterfinals ====
Saturday, October 31, 1:00 pm

Team	1	2	3	4	5	6	7	8	Final
(Newfoundland and Labrador) Brad Gushue 🔨	0	0	0	1	0	0	1	0	2
(Saskatchewan) Steve Laycock	0	1	0	0	2	0	0	2	5

Player percentages
(Newfoundland and Labrador) Team Gushue		(Saskatchewan) Team Laycock	
Geoff Walker	99%	Dallan Muyres	94%
Brett Gallant	75%	Colton Flasch	84%
Mark Nichols	90%	Kirk Muyres	97%
Brad Gushue	70%	Steve Laycock	89%
Total	86%	Total	91%

Team	1	2	3	4	5	6	7	8	Final
(British Columbia) Jim Cotter 🔨	0	1	0	0	3	1	3	X	8
(Ontario) Brad Jacobs	0	0	0	1	0	0	0	X	1

Player percentages
(British Columbia) Team Cotter		(Ontario) Team Jacobs	
Rick Sawatsky	92%	Ryan Harnden	92%
Tyrel Griffith	82%	E. J. Harnden	99%
Ryan Kuhn	91%	Ryan Fry	73%
Jim Cotter	87%	Brad Jacobs	68%
Total	88%	Total	83%

Team	1	2	3	4	5	6	7	8	Final
(Alberta) Kevin Koe 🔨	0	1	0	1	0	2	0	3	7
(Sweden) Niklas Edin	2	0	1	0	1	0	1	0	5

Player percentages
(Alberta) Team Koe		(Sweden) Team Edin	
Ben Hebert	92%	Christoffer Sundgren	91%
Brent Laing	91%	Kristian Lindström	87%
Marc Kennedy	77%	Oskar Eriksson	93%
Kevin Koe	78%	Niklas Edin	84%
Total	85%	Total	89%

Team	1	2	3	4	5	6	7	8	Final
(Manitoba) Mike McEwen 🔨	2	0	0	3	0	2	0	X	7
(Manitoba) Reid Carruthers	0	0	1	0	2	0	1	X	4

Player percentages
(Manitoba) Team McEwen		(Manitoba) Team Carruthers	
Denni Neufeld	86%	Colin Hodgson	90%
Matt Wozniak	97%	Derek Samagalski	78%
B. J. Neufeld	88%	Braeden Moskowy	85%
Mike McEwen	88%	Reid Carruthers	83%
Total	90%	Total	84%

==== Semifinals ====
Sunday, November 1, 9:00 am

Team	1	2	3	4	5	6	7	8	Final
(Saskatchewan) Steve Laycock	0	0	0	2	0	1	0	X	3
(British Columbia) Jim Cotter 🔨	1	1	1	0	4	0	1	X	8

Player percentages
(Saskatchewan) Team Laycock		(British Columbia) Team Cotter	
Dallan Muyres	94%	Rick Sawatsky	92%
Colton Flasch	88%	Tyrel Griffith	90%
Kirk Muyres	53%	Ryan Kuhn	80%
Steve Laycock	67%	Jim Cotter	85%
Total	75%	Total	87%

Team	1	2	3	4	5	6	7	8	Final
(Alberta) Kevin Koe 🔨	0	2	0	1	0	0	0	1	4
(Manitoba) Mike McEwen	1	0	1	0	0	3	0	0	5

Player percentages
(Alberta) Team Koe		(Manitoba) Team McEwen	
Ben Hebert	93%	Denni Neufeld	93%
Brent Laing	85%	Matt Wozniak	84%
Marc Kennedy	85%	B. J. Neufeld	77%
Kevin Koe	76%	Mike McEwen	92%
Total	85%	Total	86%

==== Final ====
Sunday, November 1, 1:00 pm

Sheet C	1	2	3	4	5	6	7	8	Final
(British Columbia) Jim Cotter 🔨	1	0	0	1	0	0	1	0	3
(Manitoba) Mike McEwen	0	1	1	0	0	2	0	1	5

Player percentages
(British Columbia) Team Cotter		(Manitoba) Team McEwen	
Rick Sawatsky	91%	Denni Neufeld	87%
Tyrel Griffith	72%	Matt Wozniak	72%
Ryan Kuhn	84%	B. J. Neufeld	77%
Jim Cotter	80%	Mike McEwen	99%
Total	82%	Total	83%

== Women ==
=== Teams ===
Skip	Third	Second	Lead	Locale
Mary-Anne Arsenault	Christina Black	Jane Snyder	Jennifer Baxter	Halifax, Nova Scotia
Kerri Einarson	Selena Kaatz	Liz Fyfe	Kristin MacCuish	Winnipeg, Manitoba
Binia Feltscher	Irene Schori	Franziska Kaufmann	Christine Urech	Flims, Switzerland
Tracy Fleury	Crystal Webster	Jenna Walsh	Amanda Gates	Sudbury, Ontario
Rachel Homan	Emma Miskew	Joanne Courtney	Lisa Weagle	Ottawa, Ontario
Jennifer Jones	Kaitlyn Lawes	Jill Officer	Dawn McEwen	Winnipeg, Manitoba
Kim Eun-jung	Kim Kyeong-ae	Kim Seon-yeong	Kim Yeong-mi	Uiseong, South Korea
Kristy McDonald	Kate Cameron	Leslie Wilson-Westcott	Raunora Westcott	Winnipeg, Manitoba
Sherry Middaugh	Jo-Ann Rizzo	Lee Merklinger	Leigh Armstrong	Coldwater, Ontario
Eve Muirhead	Anna Sloan	Vicki Adams	Sarah Reid	Stirling, Scotland
Alina Pätz	Nadine Lehmann	Marisa Winkelhausen	Nicole Schwägli	Zürich, Switzerland
Anna Sidorova	Margarita Fomina	Alexandra Raeva	Alina Kovaleva	Moscow, Russia
Maria Prytz (fourth)	Christina Bertrup	Maria Wennerström	Margaretha Sigfridsson (skip)	Sundsvall, Sweden
Val Sweeting	Lori Olson-Johns	Dana Ferguson	Rachelle Brown	Edmonton, Alberta
Silvana Tirinzoni	Manuela Siegrist	Esther Neuenschwander	Marlene Albrecht	Aarau, Switzerland

=== Round-robin standings ===
Final round-robin standings

Key
Teams to Playoffs
Teams to Tiebreakers

Pool A	W	L
(Ontario) Rachel Homan	4	0
(Switzerland) Silvana Tirinzoni	3	1
(South Korea) Kim Eun-jung	2	2
(Ontario) Tracy Fleury	1	3
(Sweden) Margaretha Sigfridsson	0	4

Pool B	W	L
(Nova Scotia) Mary-Anne Arsenault	3	1
(Russia) Anna Sidorova	3	1
(Manitoba) Jennifer Jones	2	2
(Ontario) Sherry Middaugh	1	3
(Switzerland) Alina Pätz	1	3

Pool C	W	L
(Alberta) Val Sweeting	3	1
(Manitoba) Kristy McDonald	3	1
(Manitoba) Kerri Einarson	2	2
(Scotland) Eve Muirhead	1	3
(Switzerland) Binia Feltscher	1	3

=== Round-robin results ===
All draw times are listed in Atlantic Daylight Time (UTC−3).

==== Draw 1 ====
Tuesday, October 27, 7:00 pm

Sheet A	1	2	3	4	5	6	7	8	Final
(Switzerland) Silvana Tirinzoni 🔨	0	0	4	2	1	0	0	0	7
(Sweden) Margaretha Sigfridsson	1	2	0	0	0	1	1	1	6

Sheet B	1	2	3	4	5	6	7	8	Final
(Scotland) Eve Muirhead	1	2	0	0	1	0	1	1	6
(Manitoba) Kerri Einarson 🔨	0	0	2	2	0	3	0	0	7

Sheet E	1	2	3	4	5	6	7	8	Final
(Russia) Anna Sidorova	0	2	0	0	0	1	0	0	3
(Nova Scotia) Mary-Anne Arsenault 🔨	1	0	2	0	0	0	1	1	5

==== Draw 2 ====
Wednesday, October 28, 8:30 am

Sheet C	1	2	3	4	5	6	7	8	Final
(Switzerland) Binia Feltscher	0	2	0	1	0	2	0	0	5
(Manitoba) Kristy McDonald 🔨	1	0	3	0	2	0	1	4	11

Sheet D	1	2	3	4	5	6	7	8	Final
(Manitoba) Jennifer Jones 🔨	2	0	4	0	1	0	1	2	10
(Ontario) Sherry Middaugh	0	2	0	1	0	2	0	0	5

==== Draw 3 ====
Wednesday, October 28, 12:00 pm

Sheet B	1	2	3	4	5	6	7	8	Final
(Switzerland) Alina Pätz 🔨	0	0	0	0	0	X	X	X	0
(Russia) Anna Sidorova	1	1	1	3	1	X	X	X	7

Sheet E	1	2	3	4	5	6	7	8	Final
(Ontario) Rachel Homan	1	0	1	0	3	0	2	X	7
(Ontario) Tracy Fleury 🔨	0	0	0	1	0	1	0	X	2

==== Draw 4 ====
Wednesday, October 28, 3:30 pm

Sheet A	1	2	3	4	5	6	7	8	Final
(Alberta) Val Sweeting 🔨	0	2	1	0	1	0	3	X	7
(Manitoba) Kerri Einarson	0	0	0	1	0	3	0	X	4

Sheet C	1	2	3	4	5	6	7	8	Final
(Ontario) Sherry Middaugh	0	2	0	3	1	3	X	X	9
(Nova Scotia) Mary-Anne Arsenault 🔨	1	0	1	0	0	0	X	X	2

Sheet E	1	2	3	4	5	6	7	8	Final
(Sweden) Margaretha Sigfridsson 🔨	1	0	0	0	0	X	X	X	1
(South Korea) Kim Eun-jung	0	1	3	1	4	X	X	X	9

==== Draw 5 ====
Wednesday, October 28, 7:00 pm

Sheet A	1	2	3	4	5	6	7	8	Final
(Scotland) Eve Muirhead 🔨	1	2	0	1	0	0	0	1	5
(Manitoba) Kristy McDonald	0	0	1	0	2	0	1	0	4

Sheet C	1	2	3	4	5	6	7	8	Final
(Ontario) Rachel Homan 🔨	0	1	0	1	0	2	0	1	5
(Switzerland) Silvana Tirinzoni	0	0	1	0	2	0	0	0	3

==== Draw 6 ====
Thursday, October 29, 8:30 am

Sheet B	1	2	3	4	5	6	7	8	Final
(South Korea) Kim Eun-jung 🔨	0	3	0	2	0	2	0	X	7
(Ontario) Tracy Fleury	0	0	1	0	1	0	1	X	3

Sheet D	1	2	3	4	5	6	7	8	Final
(Alberta) Val Sweeting 🔨	2	0	4	2	0	X	X	X	8
(Switzerland) Binia Feltscher	0	1	0	0	1	X	X	X	2

==== Draw 7 ====
Thursday, October 29, 12:00 pm

Sheet E	1	2	3	4	5	6	7	8	Final
(Manitoba) Jennifer Jones 🔨	0	2	0	0	2	3	2	X	9
(Switzerland) Alina Pätz	0	0	1	1	0	0	0	X	2

==== Draw 8 ====
Thursday, October 29, 3:30 pm

Sheet A	1	2	3	4	5	6	7	8	Final
(Ontario) Rachel Homan 🔨	1	0	0	1	0	2	0	1	5
(Sweden) Margaretha Sigfridsson	0	2	1	0	0	0	0	0	3

Sheet C	1	2	3	4	5	6	7	8	Final
(Manitoba) Kristy McDonald	0	0	1	0	2	2	0	1	6
(Manitoba) Kerri Einarson 🔨	0	1	0	1	0	0	1	0	3

Sheet D	1	2	3	4	5	6	7	8	Final
(Russia) Anna Sidorova	0	0	0	1	0	2	1	1	5
(Ontario) Sherry Middaugh 🔨	0	2	0	0	1	0	0	0	3

Sheet E	1	2	3	4	5	6	7	8	Final
(Switzerland) Silvana Tirinzoni	0	2	0	0	2	1	1	X	6
(Ontario) Tracy Fleury 🔨	1	0	1	1	0	0	0	X	3

==== Draw 9 ====
Thursday, October 29, 7:00 pm

Sheet A	1	2	3	4	5	6	7	8	Final
(Switzerland) Alina Pätz 🔨	0	0	3	0	0	0	0	0	3
(Nova Scotia) Mary-Anne Arsenault	0	0	0	1	0	1	1	1	4

Sheet E	1	2	3	4	5	6	7	8	Final
(Scotland) Eve Muirhead 🔨	1	0	1	0	1	0	2	0	5
(Switzerland) Binia Feltscher	0	1	0	2	0	1	0	2	6

==== Draw 10 ====
Friday, October 30, 8:30 am

Sheet B	1	2	3	4	5	6	7	8	Final
(Manitoba) Jennifer Jones	0	1	0	1	0	1	0	X	3
(Nova Scotia) Mary-Anne Arsenault 🔨	1	0	2	0	2	0	3	X	8

Sheet C	1	2	3	4	5	6	7	8	Final
(Scotland) Eve Muirhead	0	0	0	2	0	0	0	0	2
(Alberta) Val Sweeting 🔨	0	1	0	0	1	1	0	2	5

==== Draw 11 ====
Friday, October 30, 12:00 pm

Sheet A	1	2	3	4	5	6	7	8	Final
(Switzerland) Silvana Tirinzoni 🔨	0	0	3	1	0	4	X	X	8
(South Korea) Kim Eun-jung	0	0	0	0	1	0	X	X	1

Sheet B	1	2	3	4	5	6	7	8	Final
(Switzerland) Alina Pätz	0	2	0	1	0	2	0	X	5
(Ontario) Sherry Middaugh 🔨	2	0	1	0	0	0	1	X	4

Sheet C	1	2	3	4	5	6	7	8	Final
(Sweden) Margaretha Sigfridsson 🔨	1	0	0	0	0	2	0	X	3
(Ontario) Tracy Fleury	0	0	1	3	1	0	3	X	8

Sheet D	1	2	3	4	5	6	7	8	9	Final
(Switzerland) Binia Feltscher	0	1	0	1	0	1	0	1	0	4
(Manitoba) Kerri Einarson 🔨	0	0	1	0	1	0	2	0	2	6

==== Draw 13 ====
Friday, October 30, 7:30 pm

Sheet B	1	2	3	4	5	6	7	8	Final
(Ontario) Rachel Homan 🔨	0	1	1	0	4	0	X	X	6
(South Korea) Kim Eun-jung	0	0	0	1	0	1	X	X	2

Sheet C	1	2	3	4	5	6	7	8	9	Final
(Manitoba) Jennifer Jones	0	0	0	0	1	0	3	2	0	6
(Russia) Anna Sidorova 🔨	1	1	1	2	0	1	0	0	1	7

Sheet D	1	2	3	4	5	6	7	8	Final
(Alberta) Val Sweeting 🔨	1	0	0	1	0	0	1	0	3
(Manitoba) Kristy McDonald	0	1	0	0	0	2	0	1	4

=== Tiebreaker ===
Saturday, October 31, 9:00 am

Team	1	2	3	4	5	6	7	8	Final
(Manitoba) Jennifer Jones	3	0	3	0	3	X	X	X	9
(South Korea) Kim Eun-jung 🔨	0	1	0	1	0	X	X	X	2

Player percentages
(Manitoba) Team Jones		(South Korea) Team Kim	
Dawn McEwen	84%	Kim Yeong-mi	85%
Jill Officer	83%	Kim Seon-yeong	87%
Kaitlyn Lawes	87%	Kim Kyeong-ae	88%
Jennifer Jones	92%	Kim Eun-jung	42%
Total	86%	Total	75%

=== Playoffs ===
Quarterfinals
1	(Ontario) Rachel Homan	8
8	(Manitoba) Jennifer Jones	4
4	(Nova Scotia) Mary-Anne Arsenault	2
5	(Manitoba) Kristy McDonald	5
2	(Switzerland) Silvana Tirinzoni	7
7	(Manitoba) Kerri Einarson	10
3	(Alberta) Val Sweeting	7
6	(Russia) Anna Sidorova	3

Semifinals
1	(Ontario) Rachel Homan	8
5	(Manitoba) Kristy McDonald	5
7	(Manitoba) Kerri Einarson	3
3	(Alberta) Val Sweeting	5

Final
1	(Ontario) Rachel Homan	6
3	(Alberta) Val Sweeting	4

==== Quarterfinals ====
Saturday, October 31, 6:00 pm

Team	1	2	3	4	5	6	7	8	Final
(Ontario) Rachel Homan 🔨	0	2	0	3	0	0	0	3	8
(Manitoba) Jennifer Jones	0	0	1	0	1	1	1	0	4

Player percentages
(Ontario) Team Homan		(Manitoba) Team Jones	
Lisa Weagle	71%	Dawn McEwen	85%
Joanne Courtney	81%	Jill Officer	69%
Emma Miskew	87%	Kaitlyn Lawes	86%
Rachel Homan	90%	Jennifer Jones	81%
Total	82%	Total	80%

Team	1	2	3	4	5	6	7	8	Final
(Nova Scotia) Mary-Anne Arsenault	0	0	0	0	2	0	0	0	2
(Manitoba) Kristy McDonald 🔨	0	1	0	2	0	0	1	1	5

Player percentages
(Nova Scotia) Team Arsenault		(Manitoba) Team McDonald	
Jennifer Baxter	84%	Raunora Westcott	94%
Kim Kelly	89%	Leslie Wilson-Westcott	73%
Christina Black	78%	Kate Cameron	83%
Mary-Anne Arsenault	72%	Kristy McDonald	90%
Total	81%	Total	85%

Team	1	2	3	4	5	6	7	8	Final
(Switzerland) Silvana Tirinzoni 🔨	1	0	5	0	1	0	0	0	7
(Manitoba) Kerri Einarson	0	4	0	2	0	1	1	2	10

Player percentages
(Switzerland) Team Tirinzoni		(Manitoba) Team Einarson	
Marlene Albrecht	85%	Kristin MacCuish	86%
Esther Neuenschwander	80%	Liz Fyfe	65%
Manuela Siegrist	77%	Selena Kaatz	51%
Silvana Tirinzoni	58%	Kerri Einarson	72%
Total	75%	Total	69%

Team	1	2	3	4	5	6	7	8	Final
(Alberta) Val Sweeting	0	1	0	2	0	2	2	X	7
(Russia) Anna Sidorova 🔨	1	0	1	0	1	0	0	X	3

Player percentages
(Alberta) Team Sweeting		(Russia) Team Sidorova	
Rachelle Brown	88%	Alina Kovaleva	92%
Dana Ferguson	58%	Alexandra Raeva	74%
Lori Olson-Johns	80%	Margarita Fomina	75%
Val Sweeting	95%	Anna Sidorova	72%
Total	80%	Total	78%

==== Semifinals ====
Sunday, November 1, 9:00 am

Team	1	2	3	4	5	6	7	8	Final
(Ontario) Rachel Homan 🔨	4	0	1	0	0	2	0	1	8
(Manitoba) Kristy McDonald	0	1	0	1	1	0	2	0	5

Player percentages
(Ontario) Team Homan		(Manitoba) Team McDonald	
Lisa Weagle	76%	Raunora Westcott	84%
Joanne Courtney	95%	Leslie Wilson-Westcott	79%
Emma Miskew	88%	Kate Cameron	68%
Rachel Homan	84%	Kristy McDonald	–
Total	86%	Total	78%

Team	1	2	3	4	5	6	7	8	Final
(Manitoba) Kerri Einarson	0	1	0	1	0	0	1	X	3
(Alberta) Val Sweeting 🔨	2	0	2	0	1	0	0	X	5

Player percentages
(Manitoba) Team Einarson		(Alberta) Team Sweeting	
Kristin MacCuish	80%	Rachelle Brown	82%
Liz Fyfe	75%	Dana Ferguson	87%
Selena Kaatz	75%	Lori Olson-Johns	84%
Kerri Einarson	75%	Val Sweeting	81%
Total	76%	Total	84%

==== Final ====
Sunday, November 1, 6:00 pm

Sheet C	1	2	3	4	5	6	7	8	Final
(Ontario) Rachel Homan 🔨	0	2	0	1	0	2	1	0	6
(Alberta) Val Sweeting	0	0	1	0	1	0	0	2	4

Player percentages
(Ontario) Team Homan		(Alberta) Team Sweeting	
Lisa Weagle	90%	Rachelle Brown	93%
Joanne Courtney	87%	Dana Ferguson	81%
Emma Miskew	94%	Lori Olson-Johns	81%
Rachel Homan	99%	Val Sweeting	81%
Total	93%	Total	84%
