= 2010 Swiss Cup Basel =

Curling event held in October 2010 in Arlesheim, Switzerland

- Host city: Arlesheim, Switzerland
- Arena: Curlingzentrum Region Basel, Arlesheim
- Dates: Oct. 1-4
- Winner: (Germany) Andy Kapp
- Curling club: CC Füssen
- Skip: Andy Kapp
- Third: Daniel Herberg
- Second: Andreas Lang
- Lead: Markus Messenzehl
- Finalist: (Switzerland) Christof Schwaller

The 2010 Swiss Cup Basel was held October 1–4 in Arlesheim, Switzerland. It was one of three events held during Week 4 of the 2010-11 curling season on the World Curling Tour, and the third overall event of the newly dubbed European Curling Champions Tour.

The event format is a 32-team triple knockout with eight teams qualifying into a single-elimination playoff round. The total purse for the event is 45,900 Swiss francs (CHF).

== Teams ==
- (Switzerland) Beno Arnold
- (Switzerland) Alexander Attinger
- (Scotland) Tom Brewster
- (Sweden) Per Carlsén
- (Italy) Giorgio Da Rin
- (Switzerland) Peter de Cruz
- (Norway) Thomas Due
- (France) Thomas Dufour
- (Sweden) Niklas Edin
- (Switzerland) Pascal Eicher
- (Sweden) Oskar Eriksson
- (Scotland) Ally Fraser
- (Switzerland) Kevin Froidevaux
- (Switzerland) Pascal Hess
- (Germany) Andy Kapp
- (Switzerland) Thomas Lips
- (Switzerland) Jean-Nicholas Longchamp
- (Switzerland) Dominic Märki
- (Scotland) David Murdoch
- (Hungary) György Nagy
- (Netherlands) Mark Neeleman
- (Germany) Daniel Neuner
- (Switzerland) Claudio Pescia
- (Finland) Tomi Rantamäki
- (Italy) Joel Retornaz
- (Switzerland) Manuel Ruch
- (Switzerland) Christof Schwaller
- (Czech Republic) David Sik
- (Norway) Thomas Ulsrud
- (Czech Republic) Michal Vojtus
- (Switzerland) Patrick Vuille
- (Switzerland) Bernhard Werthemann

== Draw ==
=== A Event ===
Round of 16
(Scotland) David Murdoch	6
(Switzerland) Beno Arnold	4
(Switzerland) Thomas Lips	2
(Sweden) Oskar Eriksson	7
(Switzerland) Patrick Vuille	6
(Germany) Daniel Neuner	2
(Italy) Joel Retornaz	4
(Switzerland) Dominic Märki	5
(Sweden) Niklas Edin	5
(Switzerland) Kevin Froidevaux	6
(France) Thomas Dufour	1
(Switzerland) J. Longchamp	7
(Switzerland) Manuel Ruch	7
(Czech Republic) Michal Vojtus	6
(Switzerland) Claudio Pescia	9
(Norway) Thomas Due	5

Quarter-finals
(Scotland) David Murdoch	10
(Sweden) Oskar Eriksson	2
(Switzerland) Patrick Vuille	5
(Switzerland) Dominic Märki	4
(Switzerland) Kevin Froidevaux	3
(Switzerland) J. Longchamp	8
(Switzerland) Manuel Ruch	2
(Switzerland) Claudio Pescia	6

Semi-finals
(Scotland) David Murdoch	2
(Switzerland) Patrick Vuille	11
(Switzerland) J. Longchamp	3
(Switzerland) Claudio Pescia	6

To Quarterfinal 1
(Switzerland) Patrick Vuille	3
(Switzerland) Claudio Pescia	6

Round of 16
(Germany) Andy Kapp	8
(Hungary) György Nagy	4
(Switzerland) Pascal Hess	5
(Netherlands) Mark Neeleman	4
(Scotland) Tom Brewster	3
(Switzerland) Pascal Eicher	5
(Sweden) Per Carlsén	9
(Switzerland) Alexander Attinger	3
(Finland) Tomi Rantamäki	5
(Switzerland) Peter de Cruz	1
(Norway) Thomas Ulsrud	8
(Italy) Giorgio Da Rin	4
(Switzerland) Christof Schwaller	8
(Czech Republic) David Sik	2
(Scotland) Ally Fraser	5
(Switzerland) B. Werthemann	7

Quarter-finals
(Germany) Andy Kapp	6
(Switzerland) Pascal Hess	3
(Switzerland) Pascal Eicher	2
(Sweden) Per Carlsén	8
(Finland) Tomi Rantamäki	2
(Norway) Thomas Ulsrud	7
(Switzerland) Christof Schwaller	8
(Switzerland) B. Werthemann	4

Semi-finals
(Germany) Andy Kapp	6
(Sweden) Per Carlsén	7
(Norway) Thomas Ulsrud	4
(Switzerland) Christof Schwaller	7

To Quarterfinal 4
(Sweden) Per Carlsén	5
(Switzerland) Christof Schwaller	7

=== B Event ===
Round of 16
(Switzerland) Beno Arnold	6
(Switzerland) Thomas Lips	5
(Germany) Daniel Neuner	6
(Italy) Joel Retornaz	5
(Sweden) Niklas Edin	7
(France) Thomas Dufour	3
(Czech Republic) Michal Vojtus	4
(Norway) Thomas Due	6

Quarterfinals
(Switzerland) Beno Arnold	6
(Germany) Daniel Neuner	5
(Sweden) Niklas Edin	7
(Norway) Thomas Due	3

Semifinals
(Switzerland) Beno Arnold	7
(Germany) Andy Kapp	9
(Sweden) Niklas Edin	5
(Norway) Thomas Ulsrud	7

To Quarterfinal 2 Match
(Germany) Andy Kapp	5
(Norway) Thomas Ulsrud	4
To Quarterfinal 2
(Germany) Andy Kapp	6
(Switzerland) Patrick Vuille	5

Quarterfinals		Semifinals		To Quarterfinal 2 Match
				(Switzerland) Patrick Vuille	10
(Switzerland) Pascal Hess	6			(Finland) Tomi Rantamäki	4
(Switzerland) Pascal Eicher	3	(Switzerland) Pascal Hess	3
(Finland) Tomi Rantamäki	7	(Finland) Tomi Rantamäki	7
(Switzerland) B. Werthemann	4

Round of 16
(Hungary) György Nagy	9
(Netherlands) Mark Neeleman	1
(Scotland) Tom Brewster	6
(Switzerland) Alexander Attinger	3
(Switzerland) Peter De Cruz	7
(Italy) Giorgio Da Rin	3
(Czech Republic) David Sik	4
(Scotland) Ally Fraser	7

Quarterfinals
(Hungary) György Nagy	4
(Scotland) Tom Brewster	7
(Switzerland) Peter De Cruz	3
(Scotland) Ally Fraser	6

Semifinals
(Scotland) Tom Brewster	4
(Scotland) David Murdoch	3
(Scotland) Ally Fraser	4
(Switzerland) J. Longchamp	6

To Quarterfinal 3 Match
(Scotland) Tom Brewster	6
(Switzerland) J. Longchamp	5
To Quarterfinal 3
(Scotland) Tom Brewster	7
(Sweden) Per Carlsén	2

Quarterfinals		Semifinals		To Quarterfinal 3 Match
				(Sweden) Per Carlsén	6
(Sweden) Oskar Eriksson	8			(Sweden) Oskar Eriksson	4
(Switzerland) Dominic Märki	7	(Sweden) Oskar Eriksson	7
(Switzerland) Kevin Froidevaux	6	(Switzerland) Manuel Ruch	6
(Switzerland) Manuel Ruch	8

=== C Event ===
Round of 16
(Switzerland) Thomas Lips	6
(Italy) Joel Retornaz	4
(France) Thomas Dufour	1
(Czech Republic) Michal Vojtus	6

Quarterfinals
(Switzerland) Pascal Eicher	2
(Switzerland) Thomas Lips	8
(Switzerland) B. Werthemann	5
(Czech Republic) Michal Vojtus	3

Semifinals
(Switzerland) Thomas Lips	6
(Switzerland) B. Werthemann	5

To Quarterfinal 3
(Switzerland) Thomas Lips	6
(Switzerland) Patrick Vuille	2

Round of 16
(Germany) Daniel Neuner	7
(Norway) Thomas Due	6

Quarterfinals
(Scotland) David Murdoch	8
(Scotland) Ally Fraser	3
(Switzerland) Pascal Hess	6
(Germany) Daniel Neuner	5

Semifinals
(Norway) Thomas Ulsrud	6
(Scotland) David Murdoch	3
(Sweden) Oskar Eriksson	6
(Switzerland) Pascal Hess	8

To Quarterfinal 4
(Norway) Thomas Ulsrud	4
(Switzerland) Pascal Hess	2

Round of 16
(Hungary) György Nagy	4
(Switzerland) Peter de Cruz	6

Quarterfinals
(Switzerland) Manuel Ruch	6
(Switzerland) Peter de Cruz	3
(Switzerland) Beno Arnold	3
(Sweden) Niklas Edin	8

Semifinals
(Finland) Tomi Rantamäki	1
(Switzerland) Manuel Ruch	6
(Switzerland) J. Longchamp	3
(Sweden) Niklas Edin	5

To Quarterfinal 2
(Switzerland) Manuel Ruch	3
(Sweden) Niklas Edin	7

Round of 16
(Netherlands) Mark Neeleman	4
(Switzerland) Alexander Attinger	6
(Italy) Giorgio Da Rin	3
(Czech Republic) David Sik	10

Quarterfinals
(Switzerland) Dominik Märki	2
(Switzerland) Alexander Attinger	3
(Switzerland) Kevin Froidevaux	4
(Czech Republic) David Sik	3

Semifinals
(Switzerland) Alexander Attinger	6
(Switzerland) Kevin Froidevaux	5

To Quarterfinal 1
(Switzerland) Alexander Attinger	7
(Sweden) Per Carlsén	4

=== Playoffs ===
Quarterfinals
(Switzerland) Claudio Pescia	4
(Switzerland) Alexander Attinger	6
(Germany) Andy Kapp	7
(Sweden) Niklas Edin	2
(Scotland) Tom Brewster	3
(Switzerland) Thomas Lips	5
(Switzerland) Christof Schwaller	6
(Norway) Thomas Ulsrud	5

Semifinals
(Switzerland) Alexander Attinger	4
(Germany) Andy Kapp	6
(Switzerland) Thomas Lips	3
(Switzerland) Christof Schwaller	8

Final
(Germany) Andy Kapp	6
(Switzerland) Christof Schwaller	5

==== Quarterfinals ====
Sunday, October 3, 15:45 CET

Sheet A	1	2	3	4	5	6	7	8	Final
(Scotland) Tom Brewster	0	1	0	1	0	0	1	0	3
(Switzerland) Thomas Lips	1	0	1	0	0	2	0	1	5

Sheet B	1	2	3	4	5	6	7	8	Final
(Switzerland) Christof Schwaller	2	0	2	0	1	0	0	1	6
(Norway) Thomas Ulsrud	0	1	0	2	0	0	2	0	5

Sheet C	1	2	3	4	5	6	7	8	Final
(Switzerland) Claudio Pescia	0	2	1	0	1	0	0	0	4
(Switzerland) Alexander Attinger	0	0	0	1	0	2	1	2	6

Sheet D	1	2	3	4	5	6	7	8	Final
(Germany) Andy Kapp	0	2	4	0	1	0	X	X	7
(Sweden) Niklas Edin	0	0	0	1	0	1	X	X	2

==== Semifinals ====
Monday, October 4, 08:15 CET

Sheet A	1	2	3	4	5	6	7	8	Final
(Switzerland) Alexander Attinger	2	0	0	2	0	0	0	X	4
(Germany) Andy Kapp	0	0	1	0	2	1	2	X	6

Sheet C	1	2	3	4	5	6	7	8	Final
(Switzerland) Thomas Lips	0	0	0	2	0	1	0	X	3
(Switzerland) Christof Schwaller	1	1	4	0	1	0	1	X	8

==== Finals ====
Monday, October 4, 12:15 CET

Sheet C	1	2	3	4	5	6	7	8	Final
(Germany) Andy Kapp	0	1	0	4	0	0	0	1	6
(Switzerland) Christof Schwaller	0	0	1	0	0	3	1	0	5

== Payout ==
Place	Winnings
Champion	CHF 13,000
Runner-up	CHF 9,000
Semifinalist	CHF 4,500
Quarterfinalist	CHF 1,800
Loser of C-Qualifier	CHF 800
All other teams	CHF 150 per win
