= 2011 Canadian Mixed Curling Championship =

- Host city: Morris, Manitoba
- Arena: Morris Curling Club
- Dates: November 13–20, 2010
- Attendance: 9,148
- Winner: Prince Edward Island
- Curling club: Charlottetown CC, Charlottetown, PEI
- Skip: Robert Campbell
- Third: Rebecca Jean MacPhee
- Second: Robbie Doherty
- Lead: Jackie Reid
- Finalist: Manitoba

The 2011 Canadian Mixed Curling Championship was held November 13–20, 2010 at the Morris Curling Club in Morris, Manitoba. Prince Edward Island won its third mixed title, defeating Manitoba in the final. P.E.I. skip Robert Campbell won his second Mixed championship.

Morris was the smallest community to ever host a Canadian national curling championship.

== Teams ==
The event had many past champions involved. Alberta was skipped by Tim Krassman, who won the event with Dean Ross in 2008. Nova Scotia was skipped by Paul Flemming, who won the event in 1999 and 2003. PEI was skipped by Robert Campbell, who won the event in 1989.

The event also included 1987 Canadian Junior champion Charlie Sullivan of New Brunswick and five-time Territorial champion Steve Moss.

Locale	Skip	Third	Second	Lead	Club
Alberta	Tim Krassman	Holly Stroh	Jeff Bodin	Vicki Sjolie	Medicine Hat CC, Medicine Hat
British Columbia	Tom Buchy	Lori Buchy	Dave Toffolo	Robyn Toffolo	Kimberley CC, Kimberley
Manitoba	Terry McNamee	Lana Hunter	Allan Lawn	Lisa Blixhavn	Hamiota CC, Hamiota
New Brunswick	Charlie Sullivan	Becky Atkinson	Kevin Boyle	Jane Boyle	Riverside CC, Rothesay
Newfoundland and Labrador	Gary Wensman	Marcie Brown	Paul Mouland	Steph Casmey	Carol CC, Labrador City
Northern Ontario	Craig Kochan	Liz Kingston	Colin Koivula	Alissa Begin	Fort William CC, Thunder Bay
Northwest Territories/Yukon	Steve Moss	Kalie Dobson	Brian Kelln	Danielle Ellis	Yellowknife CC, Yellowknife
Nova Scotia	Paul Flemming	Kelly MacIntosh	Glen MacLeod	Theresa Breen	Mayflower CC, Halifax
Ontario	Chris Gardner	Erin Morrissey	Brad Kidd	Kim Brown	Arnprior CC, Arnprior
Prince Edward Island	Robert Campbell	Rebecca Jean MacPhee	Robbie Doherty	Jackie Reid	Charlottetown CC, Charlottetown
Quebec	Simon Hébert	Amélie Blais	Nicolas Marceau	Vicky Tremblay	CC Etchemin, Saint-Romuald
Saskatchewan	Steven Slupski	Allison Slupski	Derek Owens	Danielle Sicinski	Hillcrest CC, Moose Jaw

== Standings ==
Team	W	L
Prince Edward Island	10	1
Nova Scotia	9	2
Manitoba	7	4
Ontario	7	4
New Brunswick	7	4
Alberta	6	5
British Columbia	4	7
Saskatchewan	4	7
Northern Ontario	4	7
Northwest Territories/Yukon	3	8
Quebec	3	8
Newfoundland and Labrador	2	9

== Results ==
Draw 1, November 13, 18:30

Sheet A	1	2	3	4	5	6	7	8	9	10	Final
Saskatchewan (Slupski)	0	0	0	0	1	1	0	X	X	X	2
Manitoba (McNamee) 🔨	1	0	3	2	0	0	4	X	X	X	10

Sheet B	1	2	3	4	5	6	7	8	9	10	Final
Ontario (Gardner)	2	0	1	0	0	3	0	0	3	X	9
Quebec (Hebert) 🔨	0	1	0	1	1	0	0	1	0	X	4

Sheet C	1	2	3	4	5	6	7	8	9	10	Final
Newfoundland and Labrador (Wensman)	0	0	0	1	0	1	2	0	1	X	5
Prince Edward Island (Campbell) 🔨	2	0	1	0	2	0	0	2	0	X	7

Sheet D	1	2	3	4	5	6	7	8	9	10	Final
Northwest Territories/Yukon (Moss)	0	0	0	1	0	0	2	1	0	X	4
New Brunswick (Sullivan) 🔨	0	2	0	0	1	1	0	0	2	X	6

Draw 2, November 14, 09:30

Sheet B	1	2	3	4	5	6	7	8	9	10	Final
Nova Scotia (Flemming)	0	3	0	1	1	0	1	1	0	X	7
Newfoundland and Labrador (Wensman) 🔨	0	0	1	0	0	1	0	0	1	X	3

Sheet C	1	2	3	4	5	6	7	8	9	10	Final
New Brunswick (Sullivan) 🔨	0	1	0	0	3	0	1	0	3	X	8
Saskatchewan (Slupski)	0	0	2	1	0	1	0	1	0	X	5

Sheet D	1	2	3	4	5	6	7	8	9	10	Final
Alberta (Krassman)	0	2	1	0	1	0	0	0	1	X	5
Northern Ontario (Kochan) 🔨	1	0	0	1	0	1	1	3	0	X	7

Draw 3, November 14, 14:00

Sheet A	1	2	3	4	5	6	7	8	9	10	Final
British Columbia (Buchy) 🔨	0	1	2	1	0	0	0	0	1	0	5
Nova Scotia (Flemming)	0	0	0	0	2	2	1	2	0	1	8

Sheet B	1	2	3	4	5	6	7	8	9	10	Final
Northern Ontario (Kochan)	0	0	0	0	1	0	1	0	1	X	3
Prince Edward Island (Campbell) 🔨	0	2	0	1	0	1	0	1	0	X	5

Sheet C	1	2	3	4	5	6	7	8	9	10	Final
Quebec (Hebert)	1	0	2	0	0	0	0	0	1	X	4
Alberta (Krassman) 🔨	0	1	0	2	2	0	0	2	0	X	7

Sheet D	1	2	3	4	5	6	7	8	9	10	Final
Manitoba (McNamee) 🔨	1	0	2	0	1	1	1	0	0	X	6
Ontario (Gardner)	0	1	0	1	0	0	0	0	0	X	2

Draw 4, November 14, 18:30

Sheet A	1	2	3	4	5	6	7	8	9	10	Final
Newfoundland and Labrador (Wensman) 🔨	0	1	0	0	0	0	0	X	X	X	1
New Brunswick (Sullivan)	2	0	0	0	0	3	2	X	X	X	7

Sheet B	1	2	3	4	5	6	7	8	9	10	Final
Northwest Territories/Yukon (Moss)	0	2	0	0	1	1	0	2	0	X	6
Manitoba (McNamee) 🔨	2	0	3	1	0	0	2	0	3	X	11

Sheet C	1	2	3	4	5	6	7	8	9	10	Final
Ontario (Gardner)	0	0	2	1	1	0	4	0	3	X	11
British Columbia (Buchy) 🔨	1	1	0	0	0	2	0	1	0	X	5

Draw 5, November 15, 9:30

Sheet A	1	2	3	4	5	6	7	8	9	10	Final
Manitoba (McNamee) 🔨	0	0	0	1	0	0	2	0	3	2	8
Prince Edward Island (Campbell)	1	0	0	0	0	2	0	2	0	0	5

Sheet B	1	2	3	4	5	6	7	8	9	10	Final
Quebec (Hebert)	0	0	2	0	0	1	0	X	X	X	3
British Columbia (Buchy) 🔨	1	4	0	0	3	0	1	X	X	X	9

Sheet C	1	2	3	4	5	6	7	8	9	10	Final
Northern Ontario (Kochan)	0	0	0	0	2	0	2	1	1	0	6
Newfoundland and Labrador (Wensman) 🔨	1	1	1	1	0	2	0	0	0	1	7

Sheet D	1	2	3	4	5	6	7	8	9	10	11	Final
New Brunswick (Sullivan) 🔨	0	2	0	0	0	1	0	0	0	1	1	5
Nova Scotia (Flemming)	0	0	1	1	0	0	0	1	1	0	0	4

Draw 6, November 15, 14:00

Sheet A	1	2	3	4	5	6	7	8	9	10	Final
Nova Scotia (Flemming) 🔨	2	2	0	3	0	0	0	2	X	X	9
Saskatchewan (Slupski)	0	0	1	0	1	2	0	0	X	X	4

Sheet B	1	2	3	4	5	6	7	8	9	10	Final
Alberta (Krassman) 🔨	2	1	0	0	1	0	2	0	0	5	11
New Brunswick (Sullivan)	0	0	1	0	0	3	0	3	0	0	7

Sheet C	1	2	3	4	5	6	7	8	9	10	Final
Prince Edward Island (Campbell) 🔨	0	3	0	0	0	3	0	2	2	X	10
Quebec (Hebert)	0	0	1	1	2	0	1	0	0	X	5

Sheet D	1	2	3	4	5	6	7	8	9	10	Final
Ontario (Gardner)	0	1	0	0	5	0	1	0	0	X	7
Northwest Territories/Yukon (Moss) 🔨	0	0	0	1	0	2	0	0	2	X	5

Draw 7, November 15, 18:30

Sheet A	1	2	3	4	5	6	7	8	9	10	11	Final
Northwest Territories/Yukon (Moss)	1	0	1	1	1	0	0	0	1	0	2	7
Northern Ontario (Kochan) 🔨	0	1	0	0	0	1	0	1	0	2	0	5

Sheet B	1	2	3	4	5	6	7	8	9	10	Final
Newfoundland and Labrador (Wensman) 🔨	2	0	0	2	0	0	1	0	1	0	6
Ontario (Gardner)	0	0	3	0	2	1	0	1	0	1	8

Sheet C	1	2	3	4	5	6	7	8	9	10	Final
Saskatchewan (Slupski)	2	0	1	1	0	0	0	2	1	0	7
Alberta (Krassman) 🔨	0	2	0	0	2	0	0	0	0	1	5

Sheet D	1	2	3	4	5	6	7	8	9	10	Final
British Columbia (Buchy)	0	2	0	1	0	1	0	1	0	X	5
Manitoba (McNamee) 🔨	2	0	2	0	2	0	1	0	1	X	8

Draw 8, November 16, 9:30

Sheet A	1	2	3	4	5	6	7	8	9	10	Final
Saskatchewan (Slupski) 🔨	3	0	0	0	1	0	1	0	X	X	5
Ontario (Gardner)	0	2	1	2	0	3	0	2	X	X	10

Sheet B	1	2	3	4	5	6	7	8	9	10	Final
New Brunswick (Sullivan) 🔨	2	0	0	1	0	1	1	1	0	0	6
Northern Ontario (Kochan)	0	1	0	0	2	0	0	0	1	1	5

Sheet C	1	2	3	4	5	6	7	8	9	10	Final
Quebec (Hebert) 🔨	0	1	0	0	3	3	0	1	X	X	8
Manitoba (McNamee)	0	0	1	1	0	0	1	0	X	X	3

Sheet D	1	2	3	4	5	6	7	8	9	10	Final
Northwest Territories/Yukon (Moss)	0	0	0	1	0	0	0	1	X	X	2
Alberta (Krassman) 🔨	1	2	0	0	1	1	3	0	X	X	8

Draw 9, November 16, 14:00

Sheet A	1	2	3	4	5	6	7	8	9	10	Final
Northern Ontario (Kochan)	1	0	1	2	2	0	2	0	0	X	8
British Columbia (Buchy) 🔨	0	1	0	0	0	1	0	2	1	X	5

Sheet B	1	2	3	4	5	6	7	8	9	10	Final
Ontario (Gardner)	2	1	1	0	0	0	2	0	0	0	6
Prince Edward Island (Campbell) 🔨	0	0	0	1	1	1	0	2	1	1	7

Sheet C	1	2	3	4	5	6	7	8	9	10	Final
Alberta (Krassman)	0	2	0	1	0	2	0	1	0	X	6
Nova Scotia (Flemming) 🔨	1	0	3	0	5	0	1	0	2	X	12

Sheet D	1	2	3	4	5	6	7	8	9	10	Final
Manitoba (McNamee) 🔨	1	0	4	1	0	2	1	X	X	X	9
Newfoundland and Labrador (Wensman)	0	2	0	0	0	0	0	X	X	X	2

Draw 10, November 16, 18:30

Sheet A	1	2	3	4	5	6	7	8	9	10	Final
Prince Edward Island (Campbell) 🔨	1	0	0	2	0	1	0	0	0	5	9
New Brunswick (Sullivan)	0	2	0	0	2	0	1	1	0	0	6

Sheet B	1	2	3	4	5	6	7	8	9	10	Final
British Columbia (Buchy) 🔨	2	1	0	3	0	1	0	2	1	X	10
Saskatchewan (Slupski)	0	0	2	0	2	0	1	0	0	X	5

Sheet C	1	2	3	4	5	6	7	8	9	10	Final
Newfoundland and Labrador (Wensman) 🔨	3	0	1	1	0	2	0	1	0	X	8
Northwest Territories/Yukon (Moss)	0	3	0	0	3	0	2	0	3	X	11

Sheet D	1	2	3	4	5	6	7	8	9	10	Final
Nova Scotia (Flemming) 🔨	2	2	1	0	1	1	2	X	X	X	9
Quebec (Hebert)	0	0	0	1	0	0	0	X	X	X	1

Draw 11, November 17, 9:30

Sheet A	1	2	3	4	5	6	7	8	9	10	Final
Quebec (Hebert)	0	0	3	0	1	0	0	1	1	0	6
Northwest Territories/Yukon (Moss) 🔨	2	1	0	1	0	1	1	0	0	2	8

Sheet B	1	2	3	4	5	6	7	8	9	10	Final
Manitoba (McNamee) 🔨	0	1	2	0	0	0	2	0	2	0	7
Alberta (Krassman)	0	0	0	1	1	0	0	2	0	1	5

Sheet C	1	2	3	4	5	6	7	8	9	10	Final
Ontario (Gardner)	1	0	2	0	1	0	1	3	0	1	9
Northern Ontario (Kochan) 🔨	0	1	0	2	0	3	0	0	1	0	7

Sheet D	1	2	3	4	5	6	7	8	9	10	Final
Prince Edward Island (Campbell) 🔨	1	0	0	0	3	0	2	0	2	0	8
British Columbia (Buchy)	0	2	1	1	0	0	0	2	0	1	7

Draw 12, November 17, 14:00

Sheet A	1	2	3	4	5	6	7	8	9	10	Final
Alberta (Krassman)	1	2	1	1	1	1	0	X	X	X	7
Newfoundland and Labrador (Wensman) 🔨	0	0	0	0	0	0	1	X	X	X	1

Sheet B	1	2	3	4	5	6	7	8	9	10	Final
Nova Scotia (Flemming) 🔨	2	0	0	2	0	1	0	4	X	X	9
Northwest Territories/Yukon (Moss)	0	1	0	0	1	0	1	0	X	X	3

Sheet C	1	2	3	4	5	6	7	8	9	10	Final
British Columbia (Buchy)	0	1	0	1	0	0	0	X	X	X	2
New Brunswick (Sullivan) 🔨	2	0	3	0	0	2	2	X	X	X	9

Sheet D	1	2	3	4	5	6	7	8	9	10	Final
Northern Ontario (Kochan)	0	1	0	0	0	X	X	X	X	X	1
Saskatchewan (Slupski) 🔨	4	0	3	2	1	X	X	X	X	X	10

Draw 13, November 17, 18:30

Sheet A	1	2	3	4	5	6	7	8	9	10	Final
Nova Scotia (Flemming) 🔨	2	0	0	2	0	0	0	1	0	1	6
Manitoba (McNamee)	0	1	1	0	1	0	1	0	0	0	4

Sheet B	1	2	3	4	5	6	7	8	9	10	Final
Newfoundland and Labrador (Wensman)	0	0	0	2	0	3	0	2	0	0	7
Quebec (Hebert) 🔨	0	0	1	0	2	0	1	0	1	1	6

Sheet C	1	2	3	4	5	6	7	8	9	10	Final
Saskatchewan (Slupski) 🔨	0	1	0	2	0	0	0	0	2	0	5
Prince Edward Island (Campbell)	1	0	1	0	2	1	1	0	0	1	7

Sheet D	1	2	3	4	5	6	7	8	9	10	11	Final
New Brunswick (Sullivan) 🔨	1	0	0	1	1	0	2	0	0	1	0	6
Ontario (Gardner)	0	1	1	0	0	2	0	1	1	0	1	7

Draw 14, November 18, 9:30

Sheet A	1	2	3	4	5	6	7	8	9	10	11	Final
Ontario (Gardner)	0	1	1	0	3	0	1	1	0	1	0	8
Alberta (Krassman) 🔨	3	0	0	1	0	3	0	0	1	0	1	9

Sheet B	1	2	3	4	5	6	7	8	9	10	Final
Prince Edward Island (Campbell) 🔨	2	1	0	0	1	0	1	1	0	0	6
Nova Scotia (Flemming)	0	0	1	0	0	1	0	0	1	1	4

Sheet C	1	2	3	4	5	6	7	8	9	10	Final
Northwest Territories/Yukon (Moss)	0	0	2	0	1	0	1	X	X	X	4
British Columbia (Buchy) 🔨	3	4	0	2	0	2	0	X	X	X	11

Sheet D	1	2	3	4	5	6	7	8	9	10	Final
Newfoundland and Labrador (Wensman)	0	1	0	0	0	1	0	2	0	X	4
Saskatchewan (Slupski) 🔨	2	0	1	1	1	0	2	0	1	X	8

Draw 15, November 18, 14:00

Sheet A	1	2	3	4	5	6	7	8	9	10	Final
British Columbia (Buchy) 🔨	1	0	3	1	2	0	X	X	X	X	7
Newfoundland and Labrador (Wensman)	0	1	0	0	0	1	X	X	X	X	2

Sheet B	1	2	3	4	5	6	7	8	9	10	Final
Saskatchewan (Slupski)	0	3	0	2	0	5	1	X	X	X	11
Northwest Territories/Yukon (Moss) 🔨	1	0	1	0	2	0	0	X	X	X	4

Sheet C	1	2	3	4	5	6	7	8	9	10	Final
Manitoba (McNamee) 🔨	1	0	0	0	1	0	0	0	2	0	4
New Brunswick (Sullivan)	0	0	0	2	0	0	1	0	0	2	5

Sheet D	1	2	3	4	5	6	7	8	9	10	Final
Quebec (Hebert)	0	0	0	2	0	1	0	0	X	X	3
Northern Ontario (Kochan) 🔨	0	1	1	0	3	0	1	3	X	X	9

Draw 16, November 18, 18:30

Sheet A	1	2	3	4	5	6	7	8	9	10	Final
New Brunswick (Sullivan) 🔨	0	1	0	0	0	0	0	0	0	0	1
Quebec (Hebert)	1	0	0	0	0	0	0	1	0	1	3

Sheet B	1	2	3	4	5	6	7	8	9	10	11	Final
Northern Ontario (Kochan)	0	0	2	0	0	3	0	2	0	0	1	8
Manitoba (McNamee) 🔨	1	0	0	2	1	0	2	0	0	1	0	7

Sheet C	1	2	3	4	5	6	7	8	9	10	Final
Nova Scotia (Flemming) 🔨	0	0	2	1	0	0	0	2	2	X	7
Ontario (Gardner)	1	1	0	0	0	0	2	0	0	X	4

Sheet D	1	2	3	4	5	6	7	8	9	10	11	Final
Alberta (Krassman)	0	0	1	0	0	1	0	2	0	1	0	5
Prince Edward Island (Campbell) 🔨	0	1	0	1	1	0	1	0	1	0	1	6

Draw 17, November 19, 9:00

Sheet A	1	2	3	4	5	6	7	8	9	10	Final
Prince Edward Island (Campbell) 🔨	2	0	5	0	0	2	0	X	X	X	9
Northwest Territories/Yukon (Moss)	0	1	0	1	2	0	1	X	X	X	5

Sheet B	1	2	3	4	5	6	7	8	9	10	Final
British Columbia (Buchy)	0	0	1	0	1	0	X	X	X	X	2
Alberta (Krassman) 🔨	2	1	0	3	0	3	X	X	X	X	9

Sheet C	1	2	3	4	5	6	7	8	9	10	Final
Northern Ontario (Kochan)	1	0	0	1	0	2	0	0	0	X	4
Nova Scotia (Flemming) 🔨	0	1	1	0	1	0	1	1	2	X	7

Sheet D	1	2	3	4	5	6	7	8	9	10	Final
Saskatchewan (Slupski)	0	1	0	1	0	2	0	0	X	X	4
Quebec (Hebert) 🔨	2	0	1	0	2	0	2	3	X	X	10

== Playoffs ==
Tie breaker #1
Ontario	9
New Brunswick	3

Tie breaker #2
Manitoba	7
Ontario	6

Semi final
Nova Scotia	3
Manitoba	8

Final
Prince Edward Island	4
Manitoba	3

Tie breaker #1, November 19, 14:30

Team	1	2	3	4	5	6	7	8	9	10	Final
Ontario (Gardner)	0	0	0	2	1	0	5	0	1	X	9
New Brunswick (Sullivan) 🔨	0	1	0	0	0	1	0	1	0	X	3

Tiebreaker #2, November 19, 19:00

Team	1	2	3	4	5	6	7	8	9	10	Final
Manitoba (McNamee) 🔨	0	1	0	0	2	0	0	2	0	2	7
Ontario (Gardner)	1	0	0	1	0	2	1	0	1	0	6

Semi-final, November 20, 9:00

Team	1	2	3	4	5	6	7	8	9	10	Final
Nova Scotia (Flemming) 🔨	1	0	0	1	0	1	0	0	0	X	3
Manitoba (McNamee)	0	0	2	0	1	0	3	1	1	X	8

Final, November 20, 13:30

Team	1	2	3	4	5	6	7	8	9	10	Final
Manitoba (McNamee)	0	0	0	0	1	0	0	1	1	0	3
Prince Edward Island (Campbell) 🔨	0	1	1	0	0	0	1	0	0	1	4
