= Brantford Golf & Country Club =

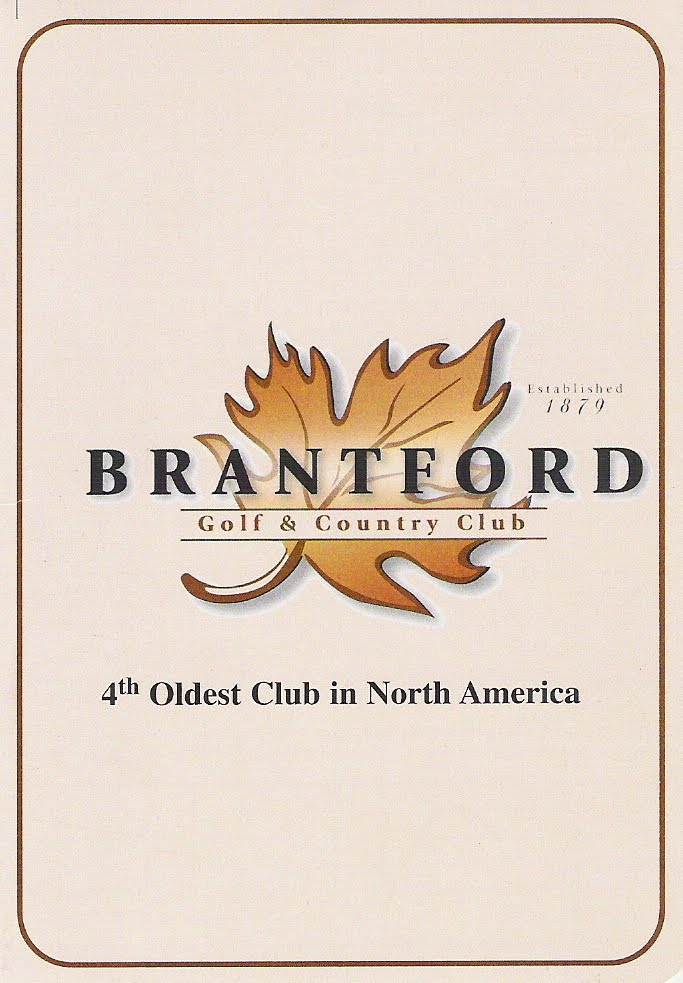
- Front of Scorecard
- Interactive map of Brantford Golf & Country Club
- 43°09′37″N 80°17′50″W

Club information
- Location: Brantford, Ontario, Canada
- Established: 1879
- Type: Private
- Total holes: 18
- Website: brantfordgolfandcountryclub.com
- Designed by: Nicol Thompson, George Cumming, and Stanley Thompson
- Par: 72
- Length: 6602 yards
- Course record: David Hearn 61 (2015)

The Brantford Golf & Country Club is a private golf course and former curling club located in Brantford, Ontario, Canada. It is the fourth oldest golf club in North America having been founded in 1879. The course is ranked 46 in 2010 Scoregolf Top 100 Courses in Canada.

== Course history ==
The first course consisted of four holes and was located at what was known as Vinegar Hill. Sometime after 1883 with the popularity of golf growing, the course was moved to Glenmount which is located north of Henry Street and east of West Street. The property was occupied by Arrowdale Golf Club until 2020.

In 1906, the course moved to the current site which is located next to Glenhyrst Art Gallery and along the Grand River. The course consisted of 9-holes until 1919 when the membership decided to purchase an additional 69 acres to expand to 18-holes.

The 18 holes were principally designed by Nicol Thompson and George Cumming while Stanley Thompson oversaw the project. The course comprised three par-3 holes, three par-5 holes and the remaining holes being par-4. The course stretched 6,300 yards.

A major redesign was approved in December 1960. C.E Robinson headed the redesign. The course was lengthened to about 6,800 yards, greens were replaced, fairway bunkers were added and the stream was re-routed and widened to create water hazards.

Renovation of the course under the direction of Rod Whitman and Keith Cutten commenced in 2021 and was completed in 2023.

== Curling ==
After 62 years, the club decided to discontinue its curling operations in 2024, amidst criticism from the local curling community. The club had hosted the annual Stu Sells Brantford Nissan Classic.

== Major tournaments ==
Year	Tournament	Winner	Score
1970	Canadian PGA Championship	Al Balding	282
1979	Canadian Amateur Championship	Rafael Alarcon	282

== Annual tournaments ==
- Walter Gretzky CNIB Golf Classic
- The Great Lakes Tour Moe Norman Cup

== Notable members ==
- David Hearn
- Alena Sharp
- Moe Norman
- Nicole Vandermade
- Jennifer Kirby
