= 2022 PointsBet Invitational =

- Host city: Fredericton, New Brunswick
- Arena: Willie O'Ree Place
- Dates: September 21–25
- Men's winner: (Manitoba) Team Carruthers
- Curling club: Morris CC, Morris
- Skip: Reid Carruthers
- Third: Jason Gunnlaugson
- Second: Derek Samagalski
- Lead: Connor Njegovan
- Coach: Rob Meakin
- Finalist: (Manitoba) Matt Dunstone
- Women's winner: (Manitoba) Team Jones
- Curling club: St. Vital CC, Winnipeg & Altona CC, Altona
- Skip: Jennifer Jones
- Third: Karlee Burgess
- Second: Mackenzie Zacharias
- Lead: Lauren Lenentine
- Alternate: Emily Zacharias
- Coach: Glenn Howard
- Finalist: (Alberta) Team Scheidegger

The 2022 PointsBet Invitational curling tournament was held from September 21 to 25 at the Willie O'Ree Place in Fredericton, New Brunswick. The event featured thirty-two Canadian teams and was the first major event of the "Season of Champions" of the 2022–23 season. It was played in a single-elimination tournament with the winning men's and women's teams of Reid Carruthers and Jennifer Jones receiving $50,000 each.

== Qualification ==
The top 12 ranked men's and women's Canadian teams on the revamped World Curling Federation's world team rankings qualified for the event. A local men's and women's team also qualified, which was selected by the host committee. Additionally, the reigning men's and women's champions of the 2022 Canadian Junior Curling Championships received a berth, along with the reigning men's and women's champions of the 2021 Canadian Curling Club Championships. The final spot was decided by a fan vote.

=== Men ===
Top world team ranking men's teams:

1. (Newfoundland and Labrador) Brad Gushue
2. (Alberta) Brendan Bottcher
3. (Manitoba) Matt Dunstone
4. (Alberta) Kevin Koe
5. (Manitoba) Reid Carruthers
6. (Ontario) Glenn Howard
7. (Saskatchewan) Colton Flasch
8. (Ontario) ~~Tanner Horgan~~
9. (Ontario) John Epping
10. (Manitoba) Mike McEwen
11. (Saskatchewan) ~~Kody Hartung~~
12. (Alberta) Karsten Sturmay
13. (Quebec) Félix Asselin
14. (Manitoba) Braden Calvert

Host team:

- (New Brunswick) Jack Smeltzer

Junior champions:

- (Ontario) Landan Rooney

Club champions:

- (Nova Scotia) Nick Deagle

=== Women ===
Top world team ranking women's teams:

1. (Manitoba) Kerri Einarson
2. (Manitoba) Kaitlyn Lawes
3. (Ontario) Tracy Fleury
4. (Manitoba) Chelsea Carey
5. (Manitoba) Jennifer Jones
6. (Ontario) ~~Krista McCarville~~
7. (Alberta) Casey Scheidegger
8. (Ontario) Hollie Duncan
9. (Alberta) Kelsey Rocque
10. (Nova Scotia) Christina Black
11. (Saskatchewan) Penny Barker
12. (Northwest Territories) Kerry Galusha
13. (New Brunswick) ~~Andrea Kelly~~
14. (Alberta) Selena Sturmay

Host team:

- (New Brunswick) Andrea Kelly

Junior champions:

- (Nova Scotia) Emily Deschenes

Club champions:

- (Ontario) Tracy Larocque

=== Fan vote ===
A fan vote was held from August 22 to 24 to determine the final men's and women's teams competing at the event.

==== Men ====
Team	%
(Newfoundland and Labrador) Greg Smith	42.8
(New Brunswick) James Grattan	37.4
(Nova Scotia) Paul Flemming	10.0
(Saskatchewan) Dallan Muyres	9.7

==== Women ====
Team	%
(Prince Edward Island) Suzanne Birt	48.8
(Saskatchewan) Nancy Martin	35.9
(Quebec) Laurie St-Georges	13.2
(New Brunswick) Jaclyn Crandall	2.1

== Men ==
=== Teams ===
The teams are listed as follows:

Skip	Third	Second	Lead	Alternate	Locale
Félix Asselin	Martin Crête	Émile Asselin	Jean-François Trépanier		Dollard-des-Ormeaux, Quebec
Brendan Bottcher	Marc Kennedy	Brett Gallant	Ben Hebert		Calgary, Alberta
Braden Calvert	Kyle Kurz	Ian McMillan	Rob Gordon		Winnipeg, Manitoba
Reid Carruthers	Jason Gunnlaugson	Derek Samagalski	Connor Njegovan		Morris, Manitoba
Nick Deagle	Jason vanVonderen	Rob Phillips	Ryan Sperry		Bridgewater, Nova Scotia
Matt Dunstone	B. J. Neufeld	Colton Lott	Ryan Harnden		Winnipeg, Manitoba
John Epping	Mat Camm	Pat Janssen	Scott Chadwick		Toronto, Ontario
Colton Flasch	Catlin Schneider	Kevin Marsh	Dan Marsh		Saskatoon, Saskatchewan
Brad Gushue	Mark Nichols	E. J. Harnden	Geoff Walker		St. John's, Newfoundland and Labrador
Glenn Howard	Scott Howard	David Mathers	Tim March		Penetanguishene, Ontario
Kevin Koe	Tyler Tardi	Brad Thiessen	Karrick Martin		Calgary, Alberta
Mike McEwen	Ryan Fry	Jonathan Beuk	Brent Laing		Toronto, Ontario
Landan Rooney	Scott Mitchell	Jacob Jones	Austin Snyder	Connor Deane	Whitby, Ontario
Jack Smeltzer	Michael Donovan	Trevor Crouse	Mitchell Small	Carter Small	Fredericton, New Brunswick
Greg Smith	Adam Boland	Chris Ford	Zach Young		St. John's, Newfoundland and Labrador
Karsten Sturmay	J. D. Lind	Kyle Doering	Glenn Venance		Edmonton, Alberta

=== Bracket ===
Round of 16
1	(Newfoundland and Labrador) Brad Gushue	8
16	(Nova Scotia) Nick Deagle	4
8	(Ontario) John Epping	7
9	(Ontario) Mike McEwen	4
5	(Manitoba) Reid Carruthers	11
12	(Manitoba) Braden Calvert	2
4	(Alberta) Kevin Koe	13
13	(New Brunswick) Jack Smeltzer	4
6	(Ontario) Glenn Howard	11
11	(Quebec) Félix Asselin	2
3	(Manitoba) Matt Dunstone	15
14	(Newfoundland and Labrador) Greg Smith	2
7	(Saskatchewan) Colton Flasch	6
10	(Alberta) Karsten Sturmay	5
2	(Alberta) Brendan Bottcher	11
15	(Ontario) Landan Rooney	3

Quarterfinals
1	(Newfoundland and Labrador) Brad Gushue	8
8	(Ontario) John Epping	4
5	(Manitoba) Reid Carruthers	8
4	(Alberta) Kevin Koe	6
6	(Ontario) Glenn Howard	7
3	(Manitoba) Matt Dunstone	8
7	(Saskatchewan) Colton Flasch	3
2	(Alberta) Brendan Bottcher	10

Semifinals
1	(Newfoundland and Labrador) Brad Gushue	4
5	(Manitoba) Reid Carruthers	5
3	(Manitoba) Matt Dunstone	9
2	(Alberta) Brendan Bottcher	5

Final
5	(Manitoba) Reid Carruthers	8
3	(Manitoba) Matt Dunstone	4

=== Knockout results ===
All draw times listed in Atlantic Time (UTC-03:00).

==== Round of 16 ====
Wednesday, September 21, 7:00 pm

Sheet A	1	2	3	4	5	6	7	8	9	10	Final
(Ontario) Glenn Howard 🔨	0	2	2	1	0	2	0	4	X	X	11
(Quebec) Félix Asselin	0	0	0	0	1	0	1	0	X	X	2

Sheet B	1	2	3	4	5	6	7	8	9	10	Final
(Manitoba) Matt Dunstone 🔨	0	3	2	0	3	0	3	4	X	X	15
(Newfoundland and Labrador) Greg Smith	0	0	0	1	0	1	0	0	X	X	2

Sheet C	1	2	3	4	5	6	7	8	9	10	Final
(Alberta) Brendan Bottcher	0	2	0	3	0	3	1	2	X	X	11
(Ontario) Landan Rooney 🔨	1	0	1	0	1	0	0	0	X	X	3

Sheet D	1	2	3	4	5	6	7	8	9	10	11	Final
(Saskatchewan) Colton Flasch	0	0	1	0	0	1	1	0	0	2	1	6
(Alberta) Karsten Sturmay 🔨	0	1	0	0	1	0	0	2	1	0	0	5

Thursday, September 22, 7:00 pm

Sheet A	1	2	3	4	5	6	7	8	9	10	Final
(Alberta) Kevin Koe	0	3	2	0	4	2	0	2	X	X	13
(New Brunswick) Jack Smeltzer 🔨	2	0	0	1	0	0	1	0	X	X	4

Sheet B	1	2	3	4	5	6	7	8	9	10	Final
(Manitoba) Reid Carruthers 🔨	0	0	2	0	2	1	2	4	X	X	11
(Manitoba) Braden Calvert	0	0	0	2	0	0	0	0	X	X	2

Sheet C	1	2	3	4	5	6	7	8	9	10	Final
(Newfoundland and Labrador) Brad Gushue 🔨	3	1	0	2	0	0	0	2	0	X	8
(Nova Scotia) Nick Deagle	0	0	1	0	2	0	0	0	1	X	4

Sheet D	1	2	3	4	5	6	7	8	9	10	Final
(Ontario) John Epping 🔨	3	0	1	0	1	0	1	1	0	X	7
(Ontario) Mike McEwen	0	2	0	1	0	1	0	0	0	X	4

==== Quarterfinals ====
Friday, September 23, 4:00 pm

Sheet A	1	2	3	4	5	6	7	8	9	10	Final
(Saskatchewan) Colton Flasch	0	0	2	0	0	0	1	0	X	X	3
(Alberta) Brendan Bottcher 🔨	2	1	0	2	0	2	0	3	X	X	10

Sheet B	1	2	3	4	5	6	7	8	9	10	Final
(Newfoundland and Labrador) Brad Gushue	0	0	4	0	0	1	0	2	1	X	8
(Ontario) John Epping 🔨	0	1	0	0	1	0	2	0	0	X	4

Sheet C	1	2	3	4	5	6	7	8	9	10	11	Final
(Ontario) Glenn Howard 🔨	1	0	2	0	1	0	0	1	0	2	0	7
(Manitoba) Matt Dunstone	0	2	0	2	0	1	0	0	2	0	1	8

Sheet D	1	2	3	4	5	6	7	8	9	10	Final
(Manitoba) Reid Carruthers 🔨	0	0	1	0	2	0	0	2	0	3	8
(Alberta) Kevin Koe	1	2	0	1	0	1	0	0	1	0	6

==== Semifinals ====
Saturday, September 24, 4:00 pm

Sheet B	1	2	3	4	5	6	7	8	9	10	Final
(Manitoba) Matt Dunstone	0	3	0	0	2	0	1	0	2	1	9
(Alberta) Brendan Bottcher 🔨	1	0	1	0	0	2	0	1	0	0	5

Sheet C	1	2	3	4	5	6	7	8	9	10	11	Final
(Newfoundland and Labrador) Brad Gushue	0	1	0	0	1	0	1	0	0	1	0	4
(Manitoba) Reid Carruthers 🔨	0	0	1	2	0	0	0	1	0	0	1	5

==== Final ====
Sunday, September 25, 3:30 pm

Sheet C	1	2	3	4	5	6	7	8	9	10	Final
(Manitoba) Reid Carruthers 🔨	1	0	0	2	0	2	1	0	2	X	8
(Manitoba) Matt Dunstone	0	0	1	0	1	0	0	2	0	X	4

Player percentages
(Manitoba) Team Carruthers		(Manitoba) Team Dunstone	
Connor Njegovan	88%	Ryan Harnden	97%
Derek Samagalski	97%	Colton Lott	83%
Jason Gunnlaugson	89%	B. J. Neufeld	89%
Reid Carruthers	94%	Matt Dunstone	92%
Total	92%	Total	90%

== Women ==
=== Teams ===
The teams are listed as follows:

Skip	Third	Second	Lead	Alternate	Locale
Penny Barker	Christie Gamble	Jenna Enge	Danielle Sicinski		Moose Jaw, Saskatchewan
Suzanne Birt	Colleen Jones (Note: Colleen Jones spared for Marie Christianson.)	Meaghan Hughes	Michelle Shea	Sinead Dolan	Montague, Prince Edward Island
Christina Black	Jenn Baxter	Karlee Everist	Shelley Barker		Halifax, Nova Scotia
Chelsea Carey	Jolene Campbell	Liz Fyfe	Rachel Erickson		Winnipeg, Manitoba
Emily Deschenes	Lauren Ferguson	Alison Umlah	Cate Fitzgerald	Taylour Stevens	Halifax, Nova Scotia
Hollie Duncan	Julie Tippin (Note: Julie Tippin spared for Megan Balsdon.)	Rachelle Strybosch	Tess Guyatt		Woodstock, Ontario
Kerri Einarson	Val Sweeting	Shannon Birchard	Briane Harris		Gimli, Manitoba
Jo-Ann Rizzo (Fourth)	Sarah Koltun	Margot Flemming	Kerry Galusha (Skip)		Yellowknife, Northwest Territories
Rachel Homan (Fourth)	Tracy Fleury (Skip)	Emma Miskew	Sarah Wilkes		Ottawa, Ontario
Jennifer Jones	Karlee Burgess	Mackenzie Zacharias	Lauren Lenentine	Emily Zacharias	Winnipeg & Altona, Manitoba
Andrea Kelly	Sylvie Quillian	Jill Brothers	Katie Forward		Fredericton, New Brunswick
Tracey Larocque	Samantha Morris	Corie Adamson	Abby Burgess (Note: Abby Burgess spared for Rebecca Carr.)		Thunder Bay, Ontario
Kaitlyn Lawes	Selena Njegovan	Jocelyn Peterman	Kristin MacCuish		Winnipeg, Manitoba
Kelsey Rocque	Danielle Schmiemann	Dana Ferguson	Rachelle Brown		Edmonton, Alberta
Kristie Moore (Note: Kristie Moore spared for Casey Scheidegger.)	Kate Hogan	Jessie Haughian	Taylor McDonald		Lethbridge, Alberta
Selena Sturmay	Kira Brunton (Note: Kira Brunton spared for Abby Marks.)	Kate Goodhelpsen	Calissa Daly (Note: Calissa Daly spared for Paige Papley.)		Edmonton, Alberta

=== Knockout bracket ===
Round of 16
1	(Manitoba) Kerri Einarson	12
16	(Ontario) Tracey Larocque	3
8	(Alberta) Kelsey Rocque	8
9	(Nova Scotia) Christina Black	6
5	(Manitoba) Jennifer Jones	9
12	(New Brunswick) Andrea Kelly	5
4	(Manitoba) Chelsea Carey	6
13	(Alberta) Selena Sturmay	10
6	(Alberta) Team Scheidegger	8
11	(Northwest Territories) Kerry Galusha	7
3	(Ontario) Tracy Fleury	8
14	(Prince Edward Island) Suzanne Birt	4
7	(Ontario) Hollie Duncan	9
10	(Saskatchewan) Penny Barker	10
2	(Manitoba) Kaitlyn Lawes	10
15	(Nova Scotia) Emily Deschenes	8

Quarterfinals
1	(Manitoba) Kerri Einarson	10
8	(Alberta) Kelsey Rocque	5
5	(Manitoba) Jennifer Jones	11
13	(Alberta) Selena Sturmay	9
6	(Alberta) Team Scheidegger	7
3	(Ontario) Tracy Fleury	6
10	(Saskatchewan) Penny Barker	4
2	(Manitoba) Kaitlyn Lawes	9

Semifinals
1	(Manitoba) Kerri Einarson	5
5	(Manitoba) Jennifer Jones	9
6	(Alberta) Team Scheidegger	8
2	(Manitoba) Kaitlyn Lawes	7

Final
5	(Manitoba) Jennifer Jones	7
6	(Alberta) Team Scheidegger	4

=== Knockout results ===
All draw times listed in Atlantic Time (UTC-03:00).

==== Round of 16 ====
Wednesday, September 21, 2:00 pm

Sheet A	1	2	3	4	5	6	7	8	9	10	Final
(Manitoba) Chelsea Carey	0	2	0	1	0	0	0	2	1	0	6
(Alberta) Selena Sturmay 🔨	1	0	2	0	0	2	1	0	0	4	10

Sheet B	1	2	3	4	5	6	7	8	9	10	Final
(Manitoba) Jennifer Jones 🔨	1	0	1	3	0	1	0	0	3	X	9
(New Brunswick) Andrea Kelly	0	2	0	0	1	0	1	1	0	X	5

Sheet C	1	2	3	4	5	6	7	8	9	10	Final
(Manitoba) Kerri Einarson 🔨	2	1	1	1	0	2	0	1	4	X	12
(Ontario) Tracey Larocque	0	0	0	0	2	0	1	0	0	X	3

Sheet D	1	2	3	4	5	6	7	8	9	10	Final
(Alberta) Kelsey Rocque	0	1	0	1	0	3	0	2	0	1	8
(Nova Scotia) Christina Black 🔨	1	0	1	0	1	0	3	0	0	0	6

Thursday, September 22, 2:00 pm

Sheet A	1	2	3	4	5	6	7	8	9	10	Final
(Alberta) Team Scheidegger 🔨	1	2	0	1	0	1	0	2	0	1	8
(Northwest Territories) Kerry Galusha	0	0	4	0	0	0	1	0	2	0	7

Sheet B	1	2	3	4	5	6	7	8	9	10	Final
(Ontario) Tracy Fleury 🔨	2	1	2	0	1	1	0	1	0	X	8
(Prince Edward Island) Suzanne Birt	0	0	0	2	0	0	1	0	1	X	4

Sheet C	1	2	3	4	5	6	7	8	9	10	Final
(Manitoba) Kaitlyn Lawes 🔨	2	2	0	0	3	1	0	1	0	1	10
(Nova Scotia) Emily Deschenes	0	0	2	2	0	0	2	0	2	0	8

Sheet D	1	2	3	4	5	6	7	8	9	10	Final
(Ontario) Hollie Duncan 🔨	3	0	0	3	2	0	0	0	1	0	9
(Saskatchewan) Penny Barker	0	1	2	0	0	2	1	1	0	3	10

==== Quarterfinals ====
Friday, September 23, 11:00 am

Sheet A	1	2	3	4	5	6	7	8	9	10	Final
(Saskatchewan) Penny Barker	1	0	1	0	0	2	0	0	X	X	4
(Manitoba) Kaitlyn Lawes 🔨	0	3	0	0	2	0	1	3	X	X	9

Sheet B	1	2	3	4	5	6	7	8	9	10	Final
(Manitoba) Kerri Einarson 🔨	2	0	2	0	2	0	0	2	2	X	10
(Alberta) Kelsey Rocque	0	1	0	1	0	3	0	0	0	X	5

Sheet C	1	2	3	4	5	6	7	8	9	10	11	Final
(Alberta) Team Scheidegger 🔨	0	2	0	0	1	1	0	0	2	0	1	7
(Ontario) Tracy Fleury	0	0	3	1	0	0	0	1	0	1	0	6

Sheet D	1	2	3	4	5	6	7	8	9	10	Final
(Manitoba) Jennifer Jones 🔨	4	2	0	2	0	2	0	1	0	0	11
(Alberta) Selena Sturmay	0	0	1	0	2	0	3	0	2	1	9

==== Semifinals ====
Saturday, September 24, 11:00 am

Sheet B	1	2	3	4	5	6	7	8	9	10	Final
(Alberta) Team Scheidegger	0	1	0	1	0	0	3	1	0	2	8
(Manitoba) Kaitlyn Lawes 🔨	1	0	2	0	2	1	0	0	1	0	7

Sheet C	1	2	3	4	5	6	7	8	9	10	Final
(Manitoba) Kerri Einarson	0	0	2	0	0	1	0	1	1	0	5
(Manitoba) Jennifer Jones 🔨	0	1	0	2	1	0	1	0	0	4	9

==== Final ====
Sunday, September 25, 10:30 am

Sheet C	1	2	3	4	5	6	7	8	9	10	Final
(Manitoba) Jennifer Jones 🔨	0	2	0	2	0	1	0	2	0	X	7
(Alberta) Team Scheidegger	0	0	1	0	1	0	1	0	1	X	4

Player percentages
(Manitoba) Team Jones		(Alberta) Team Scheidegger	
Lauren Lenentine	97%	Taylor McDonald	92%
Mackenzie Zacharias	85%	Jessie Haughian	79%
Karlee Burgess	88%	Kate Hogan	74%
Jennifer Jones	93%	Kristie Moore	74%
Total	90%	Total	80%

== Celebrity invitational ==
The event also held two celebrity exhibition games following the 'Elite 8' portion of the tournament. The teams consisted of:

- Brendan Bottcher, B. J. Neufeld, Briane Harris and actor Patrick Roach
- Jennifer Jones, Kevin Koe, and hockey players Marc Methot and Shayne Corson
- Mark Nichols, Val Sweeting, soccer player Stephanie Labbé and rapper Classified
- Kaitlyn Lawes, Ben Hebert, cyclist Georgia Simmerling and sprinter Donovan Bailey
