= Deanna Doig =

Canadian curler

- Curler
- Born: March 13, 1972 (age 54); Bethune, Saskatchewan

Team
- Curling club: Moose Jaw Ford CC; Moose Jaw, SK
- Skip: Nancy Martin
- Third: Chaelynn Stewart
- Second: Kadriana Lott
- Lead: Deanna Doig

Curling career
- Member Association: Alberta (2005–2008); Saskatchewan (2008–present)
- Hearts: 2 (2017, 2025)
- Top CTRS ranking: 8th (2008–09)
- Grand Slam victories: 1 (2008 Casinos of Winnipeg Classic)

Deanna Doig (born March 13, 1972, in Bethune, Saskatchewan) is a Canadian curler from Emerald Park, Saskatchewan. She currently plays lead on Team Nancy Martin.

== Career ==
Doig has been active on the World Curling Tour since the 2005–06 season, when she joined the Heather Rankin rink as her third. In their first season, the team played in the 2006 Canada Cup of Curling, finishing with a 1–4 record. The next season, the team played in several Grand Slam events, making the quarterfinals at the 2006 Trail Appliances Autumn Gold Curling Classic. The following season, the team played made it to the quarterfinals of the 2007 Casinos of Winnipeg Classic and went 0–5 at the 2008 Canada Cup of Curling.

In 2008, Doig joined the Michelle Englot rink as her third. The team would win Doig's lone career Grand Slam title at the 2008 Casinos of Winnipeg Classic. They also made it to the quarterfinals at the 2008 Wayden Transportation Ladies Classic. The team played in the 2009 Canada Cup of Curling, losing in the playoffs after posting a 3–2 round robin record. The next season the team played at the 2009 Canadian Olympic Trials qualifier, losing all three of their games. The next season Doig was moved to the lead position on the team. The team found little success that season and disbanded at its conclusion.

In 2011, Doig began skipping her own team. She played in the 2012 Colonial Square Ladies Classic with teammates Kim Schneider, Colleen Ackerman and Michelle McIvor, Doig's first Slam as a skip. She would win just one match, failing to make the playoffs.

Doig joined the newly formed Penny Barker rink in 2013 with Tamara Haberstock at second and Sarah Slywka at lead. They played in the 2013 Colonial Square Ladies Classic, where her team made it all the way to the quarterfinals. They began the 2014–15 season by playing in the 2014 Colonial Square Ladies Classic, failing to advance to the playoffs. They were however able to win two Saskatchewan Curling Tour events, qualifying her rink for the 2015 Saskatchewan Scotties Tournament of Hearts, where they finished 2–3. The next season, her rink of Barker, Hoffmann and Sicinski finished 3–3 at the 2016 Saskatchewan Scotties Tournament of Hearts, once again failing to advance.

Team Barker won the 2017 Saskatchewan Scotties Tournament of Hearts the following season despite entering the tournament as an underdog. Her team finished 4–4 through the round robin before winning the tiebreaker and three straight playoff games to claim the title. She defeated heavily favored teams Stefanie Lawton in the semifinal and Robyn Silvernagle in the final by scoring four in the tenth end. At the 2017 Scotties Tournament of Hearts, they were one of two teams making their debut appearance at the Hearts and it showed as they finished the round robin with a 1–10 record, only defeating Nova Scotia's Mary Mattatall.

With her Saskatchewan Scotties championship rink, Doig and her team had a good start to the 2017–18 season, winning the DEKALB Superspiel on the World Curling Tour. They also finished runner-up at the Medicine Hat Charity Classic and won two Saskatchewan Curling Tour events. She would not defend her provincial title however, losing in the 3 vs. 4 page playoff game at the 2018 Saskatchewan Scotties Tournament of Hearts to Sherry Anderson, who went on to win the event. The rink added Christie Gamble to the lineup for the 2018–19 season, replacing Schneider. They qualified for the 2019 Saskatchewan Scotties Tournament of Hearts, but failed to advance to the playoffs after a 4–4 round robin record. The team stayed intact the following season and won three more Saskatchewan Tour events. Their successful results qualified them for the 2020 Saskatchewan Scotties Tournament of Hearts, which was held in a triple knockout format this year. They qualified for the playoffs through the C side before losing to the Sherry Anderson rink in 3 vs. 4 game, like in 2018.

== Personal life ==
Doig is employed as the director of Canadian Field Operations for SouthBow. She is married and has two children.

== Teams ==
Season	Skip	Third	Second	Lead
2005–06	Heather Rankin	Deanna Doig	Samantha Preston	Nicole Jacques
2006–07	Heather Rankin	Deanna Doig	Heather Moulding	Terri Clark
2007–08	Heather Rankin	Deanna Doig	Heather Moulding	Kyla MacLachlan
2008–09	Michelle Englot	Deanna Doig	Roberta Materi	Cindy Simmons
2009–10	Michelle Englot	Deanna Doig	Roberta Materi	Cindy Simmons
2010–11	Michelle Englot	Lana Vey	Roberta Materi	Deanna Doig
2011–12	Deanna Doig	Colleen Ackerman	Carla Sawicki	Carla Anaka
2012–13	Deanna Doig	Kim Schneider	Colleen Ackerman	Michelle McIvor
2013–14	Penny Barker	Deanna Doig	Tamara Haberstock	Sarah Slywka
2014–15	Penny Barker	Deanna Doig	Amanda Craigle	Danielle Sicinski
2015–16	Penny Barker	Deanna Doig	Melissa Hoffman	Danielle Sicinski
2016–17	Penny Barker	Deanna Doig	Lorraine Schneider	Danielle Sicinski
2017–18	Penny Barker	Deanna Doig	Lorraine Schneider	Danielle Sicinski
2018–19	Penny Barker	Deanna Doig	Christie Gamble	Danielle Sicinski
2019–20	Penny Barker	Deanna Doig	Christie Gamble	Danielle Sicinski
2023–24	Nancy Martin	Deanna Doig	Nancy Inglis	Cathy Inglis
2024–25	Nancy Martin	Chaelynn Stewart	Kadriana Lott	Deanna Doig
