= Danielle Sicinski =

Canadian curler

- Curler
- Born: November 30, 1982 (age 43); Langenburg, Saskatchewan

Team
- Curling club: Moose Jaw Ford CC, Moose Jaw, SK
- Skip: Penny Barker
- Third: Lindsay Bertsch
- Second: Taryn Holtby
- Lead: Danielle Sicinski

Curling career
- Member Association: Saskatchewan
- Hearts: 2 (2017, 2022)
- Top CTRS ranking: 12th (2021–22)

Danielle Sicinski (born November 30, 1982) is a Canadian curler from Moose Jaw, Saskatchewan. She currently plays lead on Team Penny Barker. With Barker, Sicinski has won two Saskatchewan Scotties Tournament of Hearts provincial titles in 2017 and 2022.

== Career ==
Sicinski joined the Barker rink in 2009 for the 2009–10 season. After a few slow seasons, she played in her first Grand Slam of Curling event at the 2012 Colonial Square Ladies Classic. Her then rink of Barker, third Susan Lang, and second Melissa Hoffman lost all three of their games in the triple knock-out tournament. They also played in the 2011 and 2013 Saskatchewan Scotties Tournament of Hearts. At the 2011 Saskatchewan Scotties Tournament of Hearts, her team of Barker, third Amanda Craigie and lead Tamara Haberstock finished the event with a 1–4 record. At the 2013 event, they finished with a 2–3 record.

After taking a year off competitive curling during the 2013–14 season, Sicinski rejoined the Barker rink for the 2014–15 season. They began the season by playing in the 2014 Colonial Square Ladies Classic, failing to advance to the playoffs. They were however able to win two Saskatchewan Curling Tour events, qualifying them for the 2015 Saskatchewan Scotties Tournament of Hearts, where they finished 2–3. The next season, her rink of Barker, Deanna Doig and Hoffmann finished 3–3 at the 2016 Saskatchewan Scotties Tournament of Hearts, once again failing to advance.

Sicinski and her team won the 2017 Saskatchewan Scotties Tournament of Hearts the following season despite entering the tournament as an underdog. Her team finished 4–4 through the round robin before winning the tiebreaker and three straight playoff games to claim the title. They defeated heavily favored teams Stefanie Lawton in the semifinal and Robyn Silvernagle in the final by scoring four in the tenth end. At the 2017 Scotties Tournament of Hearts, they were one of two teams making their debut appearance at the hearts and it showed as they finished the round robin with a 1–10 record, only defeating Nova Scotia's Mary Mattatall.

With her Saskatchewan Scotties championship, Sicinski's rink had a good start to the 2017–18 season, winning the DEKALB Superspiel on the World Curling Tour. They also finished runner-up at the Medicine Hat Charity Classic and won two Saskatchewan Curling Tour events. They would not defend their provincial title however, losing in the 3 vs. 4 page playoff game at the 2018 Saskatchewan Scotties Tournament of Hearts to Sherry Anderson, who went on to win the event. The rink added Christie Gamble to the lineup for the 2018–19 season, replacing Schneider. They qualified for the 2019 Saskatchewan Scotties Tournament of Hearts, but failed to advance to the playoffs after a 4–4 round robin record. The team stayed intact the following season and won three more Saskatchewan Tour events. Their successful results qualified them for the 2020 Saskatchewan Scotties Tournament of Hearts, which was held in a triple knockout format this year. They qualified for the playoffs through the C side before losing to the Sherry Anderson rink in 3 vs. 4 game, like in 2018.

Following the departure of Deanna Doig, Team Barker added Jenna Enge to their lineup as their new second, moving Christie Gamble up to third on the team. Due to the COVID-19 pandemic in Saskatchewan, the 2021 Saskatchewan Scotties Tournament of Hearts was cancelled. Team Sherry Anderson was invited to represent Saskatchewan at the 2021 Scotties Tournament of Hearts, as they had the most points from the 2019–20 and 2020–21 seasons combined, which they accepted. This ended the abbreviated 2020–21 season for the Barker rink.

With their successful results over the past few seasons, Team Barker had enough points to qualify for the 2021 Canadian Olympic Curling Pre-Trials. There, the team finished with a 3–3 record, just shy of qualifying for the playoff round. On the Saskatchewan tour, the team picked up tour wins at the SaskTour Women's Moose Jaw and the SaskTour Women's Weyburn. Team Barker entered the 2022 Saskatchewan Scotties Tournament of Hearts as the second ranked team, only behind Team Chelsea Carey. In the triple knockout event, the team lost the A Qualifier game to the Carey rink before defeating Amber Holland in the B Qualifier. This qualified them for the 1 vs. 2 page playoff game which they would drop to the Carey rink. Following a win in the semifinal against Team Holland, Barker faced Carey for the third time in the championship in the provincial final. This time, Team Barker would win the match 7–5, winning the provincial title and qualifying for the 2022 Scotties Tournament of Hearts as Team Saskatchewan. At the Hearts, the Barker rink finished the round robin with a 4–4 record, just missing out on the championship round.

Team Barker had a successful 2022–23 season tour season, allowing them to easily qualify for the 2023 Saskatchewan Scotties Tournament of Hearts. To start the season, the team played in the inaugural PointsBet Invitational where after an opening game win against Hollie Duncan, they dropped their quarterfinal game to Kaitlyn Lawes. On the Saskatchewan tour, the team won three events: the Moose Jaw SaskTour Spiel, the Regina Highland SWCT Event and the SaskTour Women's Players Championship. They also had a strong showing at the 2022 Western Showdown, reaching the quarterfinals where they lost to world champions Team Silvana Tirinzoni. Despite their tour dominance in their home province, they were not able to defend their provincial title, finishing 2–3 through the triple knockout. The following season was not as successful for the team as they were unable to win any tour titles. However, their multiple quarterfinal finishes earned them enough points to qualify directly for the 2024 Saskatchewan Scotties Tournament of Hearts. In the round robin, the team had a 3–2 record which earned them a spot in the final four. Facing Michelle Englot in the 3 vs. 4 game, they lost 9–6 and were eliminated from contention. After the season, the team disbanded.

== Personal life ==
Sicinski is employed as a chartered accountant. She is married to fellow curler Derek Owens, and has a daughter. She attended the University of Regina.

== Teams ==
Season	Skip	Third	Second	Lead
2005–06	Cathy Inglis	Carla Rockochy	Denise Hersikorn	Danielle Sicinski
2009–10	Penny Barker	Laura Greffard	Tamara Haberstock	Danielle Sicinski
2010–11	Penny Barker	Amanda Craigle	Danielle Sicinski	Tamara Haberstock
2011–12	Penny Barker	Amanda Craigle	Danielle Sicinski	Tamara Haberstock
2012–13	Penny Barker	Susan Lang	Melissa Hoffman	Danielle Sicinski
2014–15	Penny Barker	Deanna Doig	Amanda Craigle	Danielle Sicinski
2015–16	Penny Barker	Deanna Doig	Melissa Hoffman	Danielle Sicinski
2016–17	Penny Barker	Deanna Doig	Lorraine Schneider	Danielle Sicinski
2017–18	Penny Barker	Deanna Doig	Lorraine Schneider	Danielle Sicinski
2018–19	Penny Barker	Deanna Doig	Christie Gamble	Danielle Sicinski
2019–20	Penny Barker	Deanna Doig	Christie Gamble	Danielle Sicinski
2020–21	Penny Barker	Christie Gamble	Jenna Enge	Danielle Sicinski
2021–22	Penny Barker	Christie Gamble	Jenna Enge	Danielle Sicinski
2022–23	Penny Barker	Christie Gamble	Jenna Enge	Danielle Sicinski
2023–24	Penny Barker	Christie Gamble	Jenna Enge	Danielle Sicinski
2024–25	Penny Barker	Lindsay Bertsch	Taryn Schachtel	Danielle Sicinski
2025–26	Penny Barker	Lindsay Bertsch	Taryn Schachtel	Danielle Sicinski
2026–27	Penny Barker	Lindsay Bertsch	Taryn Holtby	Danielle Sicinski
