= 2013 Colonial Square Ladies Classic =

- Host city: Saskatoon, Saskatchewan
- Arena: Nutana Curling Club
- Dates: November 15–18
- Winner: (Manitoba) Jennifer Jones
- Curling club: St. Vital CC, Winnipeg
- Skip: Jennifer Jones
- Third: Kaitlyn Lawes
- Second: Jill Officer
- Lead: Dawn McEwen
- Finalist: (Switzerland) Michèle Jäggi

The 2013 Colonial Square Ladies Classic was held from November 15 to 18 at the Nutana Curling Club in Saskatoon, Saskatchewan. It was the fourth of five women's Grand Slam events of the 2013–14 World Curling Tour. The event was held in a triple knockout format with 32 teams and the purse for the event was CAD$50,000. Winnipeg's Jennifer Jones would win the event, defeating Switzerland's Michèle Jäggi in the final. The win would be Jones' second Grand Slam win of the year.

== Teams ==
Skip	Third	Second	Lead	Locale
Mary-Anne Arsenault	Kim Kelly	Christie Gamble	Jennifer Baxter	Halifax, Nova Scotia
Penny Barker	Deanna Doig	Tamara Haberstock	Sarah Slywka	Regina, Saskatchewan
Kate Cameron	Erika Sigurdson	Sheyna Andries	Lindsay Baldock	Stonewall, Manitoba
Chelsea Carey	Kristy McDonald	Kristen Foster	Lindsay Titheridge	Winnipeg, Manitoba
Chantelle Eberle	Cindy Ricci	Nancy Inglis	Debbie Lozinski	Regina, Saskatchewan
Kerri Einarson	Selena Kaatz	Liz Fyfe	Kristin MacCuish	Gimli, Manitoba
Michelle Englot	Candace Chisholm	Roberta Materi	Kristy Johnson	Regina, Saskatchewan
Allison Flaxey	Katie Cottrill	Lynn Kreviazuk	Morgan Court	Listowel, Ontario
Teryn Hamilton	Hayley Furst	Jody Keim	Heather Hansen	Calgary, Alberta
Amber Holland	Jolene Campbell	Dailene Sivertson	Brooklyn Lemon	Regina, Saskatchewan
Rachel Homan	Emma Miskew	Alison Kreviazuk	Lisa Weagle	Ottawa, Ontario
Michèle Jäggi	Marisa Winkelhausen	Stéphanie Jäggi	Melanie Barbezat	Bern, Switzerland
Jennifer Jones	Kaitlyn Lawes	Jill Officer	Dawn McEwen	Winnipeg, Manitoba
Sherry Just	Alyssa Despins	Jenna Harrison	Sharlene Clarke	Saskatoon, Saskatchewan
Kim Eun-jung	Kim Kyeong-ae	Kim Seon-yeong	Kim Yeong-mi	Gyeong Buk, South Korea
Shannon Kleibrink	Bronwen Webster	Kalynn Park	Chelsey Matson	Calgary, Alberta
Stefanie Lawton	Sherry Anderson	Sherri Singler	Marliese Kasner	Saskatoon, Saskatchewan
Nancy Martin	Sharon Fleming	Lindsey Sunderland	Michelle Chabot	Saskatoon, Saskatchewan
Breanne Meakin	Katherine Doerksen	Briane Meilleur	Krysten Karwacki	Winnipeg, Manitoba
Morgan Muise	Teandra Friesen	Kristin Ochitwa	Sharla Kruger	Saskatoon, Saskatchewan
Larissa Murray	Amanda Craigie	Leah Mihalicz	Nicole Lang	Regina, Saskatchewan
Heather Nedohin	Beth Iskiw	Jessica Mair	Laine Peters	Edmonton, Alberta
Trish Paulsen	Kari Kennedy	Sarah Collin	Kari Paulsen	Saskatoon, Saskatchewan
Mandy Selzer	Erin Selzer	Kristen Mitchell	Megan Selzer	Balgonie, Saskatchewan
Jill Shumay	Kara Johnston	Taryn Holtby	Jinaye Ayrey	Saskatoon, Saskatchewan
Renée Sonnenberg	Lawnie MacDonald	Cary-Anne McTaggart	Rona Pasika	Grande Prairie, Alberta
Ros Stewart	Patty Hersikorn	Kailena McDonald	Andrea Rudulier	Saskatoon, Saskatchewan
Valerie Sweeting	Dana Ferguson	Joanne Courtney	Rachelle Pidherny	Edmonton, Alberta
Lana Vey	Alexandra Williamson	Natalie Bloomfield	Ashley Williamson	Regina, Saskatchewan
Crystal Webster	Cathy Overton-Clapham	Geri-Lynn Ramsay	Samantha Preston	Calgary, Alberta

== Playoffs ==
Quarterfinals
(Alberta) Valerie Sweeting	4
(Manitoba) Jennifer Jones	6
(South Korea) Kim Eun-jung	4
(Alberta) Renée Sonnenberg	9
(Switzerland) Michèle Jäggi	7
(Saskatchewan) Penny Barker	0
(Ontario) Allison Flaxey	8
(Manitoba) Breanne Meakin	3

Semifinals
(Manitoba) Jennifer Jones	7
(Alberta) Renée Sonnenberg	3
(Switzerland) Michèle Jäggi	5
(Ontario) Allison Flaxey	4

Final
(Manitoba) Jennifer Jones	7
(Switzerland) Michèle Jäggi	3
