= 2020 Saskatchewan Scotties Tournament of Hearts =

2020 Viterra Scotties Women's Provincial Championship
- Host city: Melville, Saskatchewan
- Arena: Horizone Credit Union Centre
- Dates: January 24–28
- Winner: Team Silvernagle
- Curling club: Twin Rivers CC, North Battleford
- Skip: Robyn Silvernagle
- Third: Stefanie Lawton
- Second: Jessie Hunkin
- Lead: Kara Thevenot
- Coach: Lesley McEwan
- Finalist: Sherry Anderson

The 2020 Viterra Saskatchewan Scotties Tournament of Hearts, the provincial women's curling championship for Saskatchewan, was held from January 24–28 at the Horizone Credit Union Centre in Melville, Saskatchewan. The winning Robyn Silvernagle rink represented Saskatchewan on home turf at the 2020 Scotties Tournament of Hearts in Moose Jaw, Saskatchewan and finished with a 6–5 record.

== Teams ==
The teams are listed as follows:

| Skip | Third | Second | Lead | Alternate | Club |
|---|---|---|---|---|---|
| Sherry Anderson | Nancy Martin | Meaghan Frerichs | Chaelynn Kitz | | Nutana Curling Club |
| Penny Barker | Deanna Doig | Christie Gamble | Danielle Sicinski | | Moose Jaw Ford Curling Centre |
| Michelle Englot | Sara England | Shelby Brandt | Nicole Bender | | Highland Curling Club |
| Shalon Fleming | Candace Newkirk | Sherilee Orsted | Jasmine Kerr | | Highland Curling Club |
| Amber Holland | Cindi Ricci | Laura Strong | Deb Lozinski | | Callie Curling Club |
| Ashley Howard | Kourtney Fesser | Krista Fesser | Kaylin Skinner | | Sutherland Curling Club |
| Loraine Schneider | Larisa Murray | Ashley Williamson | Jill de Gooijer | | Highland Curling Club |
| Mandy Selzer | Erin Barnhart | Megan Selzer | Sarah Slywka | | Highland Curling Club |
| Robyn Silvernagle | Stefanie Lawton | Jessie Hunkin | Kara Thevenot | | Twin Rivers Curling Club |
| Kelly Schafer (Fourth) | Kristen Streifel (Skip) | Amélie Blais | Dayna Demers | Jolene Campbell | Swift Current Curling Club |
| Jana Tisdale | Krista Ellingson | Ellen Redlick | Brett Day | | Nutana Curling Club |
| Rae Ann Williamson | Alexandra Williamson | Chantel Martin | Amanda Kuzyk | | Highland Curling Club |

== Knockout brackets ==
=== A event ===
First Knockout
Kristen Streifel | 7
Jana Tisdale | 6
Michelle Englot | 3
Mandy Selzer | 2
Ashley Howard | 3
Rae Ann Williamson | 9
Lorraine Schneider | 8
Shalon Fleming | 9

Quarterfinals
Sherry Anderson | 6
Kristen Streifel | 5
Amber Holland | 7
Michelle Englot | 9
Penny Barker | 10
Rae Ann Williamson | 7
Robyn Silvernagle | 8
Shalon Fleming | 2

Semifinals
Sherry Anderson | 5
Michelle Englot | 8
Penny Barker | 5
Robyn Silvernagle | 7

A Qualifier
Michelle Englot | 6
Robyn Silvernagle | 7

=== B event ===
Second Knockout
Amber Holland | 7
Jana Tisdale | 2
Rae Ann Williamson | 2
Mandy Selzer | 9
Shalon Fleming | 5
Ashley Howard | 10
Kristen Streifel | 9
Lorraine Schneider | 3

Quarterfinals
Amber Holland | 5
Penny Barker | 8
Mandy Selzer | 1
Sherry Anderson | 9
Ashley Howard | 9
Kristen Streifel | 8

Semifinals
Penny Barker | 6
Sherry Anderson | 7
Ashley Howard | 11
Michelle Englot | 8

B Qualifier
Sherry Anderson | 8
Ashley Howard | 9

=== C event ===
Third Knockout (Top Half)
Jana Tisdale | 3
Rae Ann Williamson | 9

Semifinals
Rae Ann Williamson | 10
Michelle Englot | 6
Kristen Streifel | 8
Penny Barker | 9

C Qualifier
Rae Ann Williamson | 2
Penny Barker | 9

| Third Knockout (Bottom Half) | | Semifinals | | C Qualifier |
| Shalon Fleming | 1 |
| Amber Holland | 12 | Amber Holland | 6 |
| Lorraine Schneider | 6 | Mandy Selzer | 7 |
| Mandy Selzer | 10 | | | Mandy Selzer | 5 |
| | | | | Sherry Anderson | 6 |

== Knockout results ==
All draws are listed in Central Time (UTC−06:00).

=== Draw 1 ===
Friday, January 24, 2:00 pm

| Sheet 1 | 1 | 2 | 3 | 4 | 5 | 6 | 7 | 8 | 9 | 10 | Final |
|---|---|---|---|---|---|---|---|---|---|---|---|
| Michelle Englot | 1 | 1 | 0 | 0 | 0 | 1 | 0 | 0 | 0 | X | 3 |
| Mandy Selzer | 0 | 0 | 0 | 1 | 0 | 0 | 0 | 0 | 1 | X | 2 |

| Sheet 2 | 1 | 2 | 3 | 4 | 5 | 6 | 7 | 8 | 9 | 10 | 11 | Final |
|---|---|---|---|---|---|---|---|---|---|---|---|---|
| Loraine Schneider | 0 | 1 | 0 | 5 | 0 | 0 | 0 | 1 | 0 | 1 | 0 | 8 |
| Shalon Fleming | 0 | 0 | 2 | 0 | 1 | 2 | 1 | 0 | 2 | 0 | 1 | 9 |

| Sheet 3 | 1 | 2 | 3 | 4 | 5 | 6 | 7 | 8 | 9 | 10 | Final |
|---|---|---|---|---|---|---|---|---|---|---|---|
| Ashley Howard | 2 | 0 | 0 | 0 | 0 | 0 | 2 | 0 | 0 | X | 3 |
| Rae Ann Williamson | 0 | 0 | 2 | 1 | 1 | 1 | 0 | 2 | 2 | X | 9 |

| Sheet 4 | 1 | 2 | 3 | 4 | 5 | 6 | 7 | 8 | 9 | 10 | Final |
|---|---|---|---|---|---|---|---|---|---|---|---|
| Kristen Streifel | 0 | 3 | 0 | 2 | 0 | 0 | 0 | 1 | 0 | 1 | 7 |
| Jana Tisdale | 1 | 0 | 2 | 0 | 0 | 0 | 2 | 0 | 1 | 0 | 6 |

=== Draw 2 ===
Friday, January 24, 7:30 pm

| Sheet 1 | 1 | 2 | 3 | 4 | 5 | 6 | 7 | 8 | 9 | 10 | 11 | Final |
|---|---|---|---|---|---|---|---|---|---|---|---|---|
| Penny Barker | 0 | 1 | 0 | 0 | 0 | 2 | 2 | 0 | 2 | 0 | 3 | 10 |
| Rae Ann Williamson | 1 | 0 | 0 | 2 | 2 | 0 | 0 | 1 | 0 | 1 | 0 | 7 |

| Sheet 2 | 1 | 2 | 3 | 4 | 5 | 6 | 7 | 8 | 9 | 10 | Final |
|---|---|---|---|---|---|---|---|---|---|---|---|
| Sherry Anderson | 0 | 0 | 0 | 3 | 1 | 0 | 0 | 1 | 0 | 1 | 6 |
| Kristen Streifel | 0 | 2 | 1 | 0 | 0 | 0 | 1 | 0 | 1 | 0 | 5 |

| Sheet 3 | 1 | 2 | 3 | 4 | 5 | 6 | 7 | 8 | 9 | 10 | Final |
|---|---|---|---|---|---|---|---|---|---|---|---|
| Robyn Silvernagle | 2 | 0 | 2 | 0 | 1 | 2 | 0 | 1 | X | X | 8 |
| Shalon Fleming | 0 | 0 | 0 | 1 | 0 | 0 | 1 | 0 | X | X | 2 |

| Sheet 4 | 1 | 2 | 3 | 4 | 5 | 6 | 7 | 8 | 9 | 10 | Final |
|---|---|---|---|---|---|---|---|---|---|---|---|
| Amber Holland | 0 | 0 | 0 | 3 | 2 | 0 | 0 | 0 | 2 | 0 | 7 |
| Michelle Englot | 0 | 1 | 1 | 0 | 0 | 3 | 0 | 3 | 0 | 1 | 9 |

=== Draw 3 ===
Saturday, January 25, 9:00 am

| Sheet 3 | 1 | 2 | 3 | 4 | 5 | 6 | 7 | 8 | 9 | 10 | Final |
|---|---|---|---|---|---|---|---|---|---|---|---|
| Sherry Anderson | 0 | 1 | 0 | 1 | 0 | 0 | 2 | 0 | 1 | 0 | 5 |
| Michelle Englot | 1 | 0 | 0 | 0 | 2 | 1 | 0 | 2 | 0 | 2 | 8 |

| Sheet 4 | 1 | 2 | 3 | 4 | 5 | 6 | 7 | 8 | 9 | 10 | Final |
|---|---|---|---|---|---|---|---|---|---|---|---|
| Penny Barker | 1 | 0 | 3 | 0 | 0 | 0 | 1 | 0 | 0 | 0 | 5 |
| Robyn Silvernagle | 0 | 1 | 0 | 2 | 2 | 1 | 0 | 0 | 0 | 1 | 7 |

=== Draw 4 ===
Saturday, January 25, 3:00 pm

| Sheet 1 | 1 | 2 | 3 | 4 | 5 | 6 | 7 | 8 | 9 | 10 | Final |
|---|---|---|---|---|---|---|---|---|---|---|---|
| Amber Holland | 1 | 0 | 1 | 0 | 3 | 1 | 0 | 1 | X | X | 7 |
| Jana Tisdale | 0 | 0 | 0 | 1 | 0 | 0 | 1 | 0 | X | X | 2 |

| Sheet 2 | 1 | 2 | 3 | 4 | 5 | 6 | 7 | 8 | 9 | 10 | Final |
|---|---|---|---|---|---|---|---|---|---|---|---|
| Shalon Fleming | 0 | 1 | 0 | 1 | 0 | 1 | 0 | 2 | 0 | X | 5 |
| Ashley Howard | 0 | 0 | 2 | 0 | 3 | 0 | 4 | 0 | 1 | X | 10 |

| Sheet 3 | 1 | 2 | 3 | 4 | 5 | 6 | 7 | 8 | 9 | 10 | Final |
|---|---|---|---|---|---|---|---|---|---|---|---|
| Rae Ann Williamson | 0 | 0 | 0 | 1 | 0 | 1 | 0 | 0 | X | X | 2 |
| Mandy Selzer | 2 | 0 | 1 | 0 | 1 | 0 | 3 | 2 | X | X | 9 |

| Sheet 4 | 1 | 2 | 3 | 4 | 5 | 6 | 7 | 8 | 9 | 10 | Final |
|---|---|---|---|---|---|---|---|---|---|---|---|
| Kristen Streifel | 3 | 0 | 0 | 2 | 0 | 3 | 0 | 1 | X | X | 9 |
| Loraine Schneider | 0 | 1 | 0 | 0 | 1 | 0 | 1 | 0 | X | X | 3 |

=== Draw 5 ===
Saturday, January 25, 7:30 pm

| Sheet 1 | 1 | 2 | 3 | 4 | 5 | 6 | 7 | 8 | 9 | 10 | 11 | Final |
|---|---|---|---|---|---|---|---|---|---|---|---|---|
| Ashley Howard | 0 | 2 | 0 | 1 | 0 | 0 | 2 | 1 | 2 | 0 | 1 | 9 |
| Kristen Streifel | 2 | 0 | 2 | 0 | 1 | 1 | 0 | 0 | 0 | 2 | 0 | 8 |

| Sheet 2 | 1 | 2 | 3 | 4 | 5 | 6 | 7 | 8 | 9 | 10 | Final |
|---|---|---|---|---|---|---|---|---|---|---|---|
| Michelle Englot | 0 | 1 | 0 | 1 | 0 | 0 | 1 | 2 | 1 | 0 | 6 |
| Robyn Silvernagle | 0 | 0 | 3 | 0 | 2 | 1 | 0 | 0 | 0 | 1 | 7 |

| Sheet 3 | 1 | 2 | 3 | 4 | 5 | 6 | 7 | 8 | 9 | 10 | Final |
|---|---|---|---|---|---|---|---|---|---|---|---|
| Amber Holland | 0 | 0 | 0 | 0 | 2 | 0 | 1 | 0 | 2 | 0 | 5 |
| Penny Barker | 0 | 1 | 1 | 1 | 0 | 1 | 0 | 2 | 0 | 2 | 8 |

| Sheet 4 | 1 | 2 | 3 | 4 | 5 | 6 | 7 | 8 | 9 | 10 | Final |
|---|---|---|---|---|---|---|---|---|---|---|---|
| Mandy Selzer | 0 | 1 | 0 | 0 | 0 | 0 | X | X | X | X | 1 |
| Sherry Anderson | 2 | 0 | 3 | 1 | 1 | 2 | X | X | X | X | 9 |

=== Draw 6 ===
Sunday, January 26, 10:00 am

| Sheet 1 | 1 | 2 | 3 | 4 | 5 | 6 | 7 | 8 | 9 | 10 | Final |
|---|---|---|---|---|---|---|---|---|---|---|---|
| Shalon Fleming | 0 | 0 | 0 | 1 | 0 | X | X | X | X | X | 1 |
| Amber Holland | 3 | 4 | 2 | 0 | 3 | X | X | X | X | X | 12 |

| Sheet 2 | 1 | 2 | 3 | 4 | 5 | 6 | 7 | 8 | 9 | 10 | Final |
|---|---|---|---|---|---|---|---|---|---|---|---|
| Jana Tisdale | 2 | 0 | 0 | 0 | 0 | 1 | 0 | 0 | X | X | 3 |
| Rae Ann Williamson | 0 | 3 | 0 | 1 | 1 | 0 | 2 | 2 | X | X | 9 |

| Sheet 3 | 1 | 2 | 3 | 4 | 5 | 6 | 7 | 8 | 9 | 10 | Final |
|---|---|---|---|---|---|---|---|---|---|---|---|
| Loraine Schneider | 0 | 0 | 1 | 0 | 2 | 0 | 2 | 0 | 1 | X | 6 |
| Mandy Selzer | 2 | 2 | 0 | 1 | 0 | 4 | 0 | 1 | 0 | X | 10 |

=== Draw 7 ===
Sunday, January 26, 3:00 pm

| Sheet 1 | 1 | 2 | 3 | 4 | 5 | 6 | 7 | 8 | 9 | 10 | Final |
|---|---|---|---|---|---|---|---|---|---|---|---|
| Penny Barker | 1 | 0 | 0 | 1 | 2 | 0 | 0 | 0 | 2 | 0 | 6 |
| Sherry Anderson | 0 | 0 | 1 | 0 | 0 | 1 | 1 | 3 | 0 | 1 | 7 |

| Sheet 3 | 1 | 2 | 3 | 4 | 5 | 6 | 7 | 8 | 9 | 10 | Final |
|---|---|---|---|---|---|---|---|---|---|---|---|
| Ashley Howard | 2 | 0 | 2 | 0 | 4 | 0 | 2 | 0 | 1 | X | 11 |
| Michelle Englot | 0 | 3 | 0 | 1 | 0 | 2 | 0 | 2 | 0 | X | 8 |

=== Draw 8 ===
Sunday, January 26, 7:30 pm

| Sheet 1 | 1 | 2 | 3 | 4 | 5 | 6 | 7 | 8 | 9 | 10 | Final |
|---|---|---|---|---|---|---|---|---|---|---|---|
| Rae Ann Williamson | 2 | 0 | 2 | 0 | 1 | 1 | 0 | 0 | 2 | 2 | 10 |
| Michelle Englot | 0 | 2 | 0 | 1 | 0 | 0 | 2 | 1 | 0 | 0 | 6 |

| Sheet 2 | 1 | 2 | 3 | 4 | 5 | 6 | 7 | 8 | 9 | 10 | Final |
|---|---|---|---|---|---|---|---|---|---|---|---|
| Sherry Anderson | 2 | 0 | 1 | 0 | 1 | 0 | 1 | 0 | 3 | X | 8 |
| Ashley Howard | 0 | 1 | 0 | 2 | 0 | 4 | 0 | 2 | 0 | X | 9 |

| Sheet 3 | 1 | 2 | 3 | 4 | 5 | 6 | 7 | 8 | 9 | 10 | Final |
|---|---|---|---|---|---|---|---|---|---|---|---|
| Kristen Streifel | 1 | 0 | 1 | 0 | 1 | 0 | 2 | 0 | 3 | 0 | 8 |
| Penny Barker | 0 | 2 | 0 | 1 | 0 | 3 | 0 | 2 | 0 | 1 | 9 |

| Sheet 4 | 1 | 2 | 3 | 4 | 5 | 6 | 7 | 8 | 9 | 10 | Final |
|---|---|---|---|---|---|---|---|---|---|---|---|
| Amber Holland | 1 | 1 | 2 | 0 | 0 | 0 | 1 | 0 | 1 | 0 | 6 |
| Mandy Selzer | 0 | 0 | 0 | 1 | 1 | 2 | 0 | 2 | 0 | 1 | 7 |

=== Draw 9 ===
Monday, January 27, 1:00 pm

| Sheet 3 | 1 | 2 | 3 | 4 | 5 | 6 | 7 | 8 | 9 | 10 | Final |
|---|---|---|---|---|---|---|---|---|---|---|---|
| Mandy Selzer | 0 | 0 | 0 | 1 | 0 | 0 | 1 | 0 | 3 | 0 | 5 |
| Sherry Anderson | 0 | 0 | 2 | 0 | 0 | 1 | 0 | 2 | 0 | 1 | 6 |

| Sheet 4 | 1 | 2 | 3 | 4 | 5 | 6 | 7 | 8 | 9 | 10 | Final |
|---|---|---|---|---|---|---|---|---|---|---|---|
| Rae Ann Williamson | 0 | 0 | 0 | 1 | 1 | 0 | X | X | X | X | 2 |
| Penny Barker | 3 | 2 | 1 | 0 | 0 | 3 | X | X | X | X | 9 |

== Playoffs ==
Page playoff system
A | Robyn Silvernagle | 7
B | Ashley Howard | 6
C1 | Penny Barker | 2
C2 | Sherry Anderson | 10

Semifinal
B | Ashley Howard | 5
C2 | Sherry Anderson | 7

Final
A | Robyn Silvernagle | 8
C2 | Sherry Anderson | 5

=== A vs. B ===
Monday, January 27, 7:30 pm

| Sheet 2 | 1 | 2 | 3 | 4 | 5 | 6 | 7 | 8 | 9 | 10 | Final |
|---|---|---|---|---|---|---|---|---|---|---|---|
| Robyn Silvernagle | 1 | 0 | 0 | 1 | 0 | 0 | 2 | 1 | 0 | 2 | 7 |
| Ashley Howard | 0 | 0 | 2 | 0 | 2 | 1 | 0 | 0 | 1 | 0 | 6 |

=== C1 vs. C2 ===
Monday, January 27, 7:30 pm

| Sheet 1 | 1 | 2 | 3 | 4 | 5 | 6 | 7 | 8 | 9 | 10 | Final |
|---|---|---|---|---|---|---|---|---|---|---|---|
| Penny Barker | 0 | 1 | 0 | 0 | 1 | 0 | 0 | X | X | X | 2 |
| Sherry Anderson | 2 | 0 | 3 | 3 | 0 | 0 | 2 | X | X | X | 10 |

=== Semifinal ===
Tuesday, January 28, 9:30 am

| Sheet 2 | 1 | 2 | 3 | 4 | 5 | 6 | 7 | 8 | 9 | 10 | Final |
|---|---|---|---|---|---|---|---|---|---|---|---|
| Ashley Howard | 0 | 1 | 1 | 0 | 1 | 0 | 2 | 0 | 0 | 0 | 5 |
| Sherry Anderson | 0 | 0 | 0 | 1 | 0 | 2 | 0 | 2 | 1 | 1 | 7 |

=== Final ===
Tuesday, January 28, 2:30 pm

| Sheet 3 | 1 | 2 | 3 | 4 | 5 | 6 | 7 | 8 | 9 | 10 | Final |
|---|---|---|---|---|---|---|---|---|---|---|---|
| Robyn Silvernagle | 0 | 1 | 0 | 3 | 0 | 0 | 1 | 1 | 0 | 2 | 8 |
| Sherry Anderson | 0 | 0 | 2 | 0 | 1 | 0 | 0 | 0 | 2 | 0 | 5 |

2020 Saskatchewan Scotties Tournament of Hearts

Robyn Silvernagle
2nd Saskatchewan Provincial Championship title
