= 2018 Saskatchewan Scotties Tournament of Hearts =

2018 Viterra Saskatchewan Scotties Tournament of Hearts
- Host city: Melfort, Saskatchewan
- Arena: Northern Lights Palace
- Dates: January 2–7
- Winner: Team Anderson
- Curling club: Nutana CC, Saskatoon
- Skip: Sherry Anderson
- Third: Kourtney Fesser
- Second: Krista Fesser
- Lead: Karlee Korchinski
- Finalist: Robyn Silvernagle

The 2018 Viterra Saskatchewan Scotties Tournament of Hearts, the provincial women's curling championship for Saskatchewan, was held from January 2–7 at the Northern Lights Palace in Melfort, Saskatchewan. The winning Sherry Anderson team represented Saskatchewan at the 2018 Scotties Tournament of Hearts.

Candace Chisholm, skip of the Chisholm rink won the Marj Mitchell Award for sportsmanship and competitiveness.

== Qualification Process ==
Qualification method	Berths	Qualifying team
CTRS leaders	3	Penny Barker; Chantelle Eberle; Robyn Silvernagle
SWCT Champion	1	Nancy Martin
SWCT Runner-Up	1	Ashley Howard
Challenge Round	2	Amber Holland; Sherry Anderson
Last Chance	2	Candace Chisholm; Stefanie Lawton

- Nancy Martin Is Playing In The Mixed Doubles Trials She Will Be Replaced By Taryn Schactel

== Teams ==
The teams are listed as follows:

Skip	Third	Second	Lead	Club(s)
Sherry Anderson	Kourtney Fesser	Krista Fesser	Karlee Korchinski	Nutana Curling Club, Saskatoon
Penny Barker	Deanna Doig	Lorraine Schneider	Danielle Sicinski	Moose Jaw Ford Curling Centre, Moose Jaw
Candace Chisholm	Lana Vey	Natalie Bloomfield	Kristy Johnson	Carlyle Curling Club, Carlyle
Chantelle Eberle	Christie Gamble	Larisa Murray	Haylee Jameson	Callie Curling Club, Regina
Amber Holland	Sherri Singler	Laura Strong	Deb Lozinski	Callie Curling Club, Regina
Ashley Howard	Carly Howard	Kim Schneider	Ashley Williamson	Highland Curling Club, Regina
Stefanie Lawton	Stephanie Schmidt	Cristina Goertzen	Brooklyn Lemon	Nutana Curling Club, Saskatoon
Taryn Schactel	Alyssa Jenkins	Meaghan Frerichs	Teresa Waterfield	Nutana Curling Club, Saskatoon
Robyn Silvernagle	Jolene Campbell	Dayna Demers	Kara Thevenot	Twin Rivers Curling Club, North Battleford

== Round robin standings ==
Key
Teams to Playoffs
Teams to Tiebreakers

	W	L
Robyn Silvernagle	7	1
Chantelle Eberle	6	2
Sherry Anderson	4	4
Stefanie Lawton	4	4
Penny Barker	4	4
Candace Chisholm	3	5
Ashley Howard	3	5
Team Martin	3	5
Amber Holland	2	6

== Round Robin Results ==
=== Draw 1 ===
Tuesday, January 2, 2:00

Sheet 1	1	2	3	4	5	6	7	8	9	10	Final
Chantelle Eberle	2	2	0	1	0	0	2	1	0	X	8
Robyn Silvernagle	0	0	1	0	0	2	0	0	2	X	5

Sheet 2	1	2	3	4	5	6	7	8	9	10	Final
Penny Barker	0	2	0	1	1	2	1	0	0	1	8
Team Martin	1	0	1	0	0	0	0	1	2	0	5

Sheet 3	1	2	3	4	5	6	7	8	9	10	Final
Stefanie Lawton	0	2	1	0	1	0	1	1	0	0	6
Ashley Howard	1	0	0	1	0	1	0	0	2	0	5

Sheet 4	1	2	3	4	5	6	7	8	9	10	Final
Candace Chisholm	0	0	1	0	0	0	1	0	2	0	4
Sherry Anderson	0	1	0	1	1	0	0	2	0	1	6

=== Draw 2 ===
Tuesday, January 2, 7:30

Sheet 1	1	2	3	4	5	6	7	8	9	10	Final
Stefanie Lawton	1	0	1	1	1	3	X	X	X	X	7
Team Martin	0	0	0	0	0	0	X	X	X	X	0

Sheet 2	1	2	3	4	5	6	7	8	9	10	Final
Ashley Howard	0	6	0	0	1	1	0	2	X	X	10
Sherry Anderson	0	0	0	1	0	0	3	0	X	X	4

Sheet 3	1	2	3	4	5	6	7	8	9	10	Final
Amber Holland	0	1	0	1	1	1	0	1	0	X	5
Chantelle Eberle	1	0	2	0	0	0	1	0	3	X	7

Sheet 4	1	2	3	4	5	6	7	8	9	10	11	Final
Robyn Silvernagle	1	0	0	2	0	0	0	0	0	0	1	4
Penny Barker	0	0	0	0	0	0	1	0	1	1	0	3

=== Draw 3 ===
January 3, 11:00am

Sheet 1	1	2	3	4	5	6	7	8	9	10	Final
Amber Holland	3	0	0	0	1	0	1	0	1	0	6
Ashley Howard	0	1	0	1	0	1	0	3	0	1	7

Sheet 2	1	2	3	4	5	6	7	8	9	10	11	Final
Candace Chisholm	1	1	0	1	0	0	1	0	0	2	0	6
Robyn Silvernagle	0	0	1	0	2	0	0	1	2	0	1	7

Sheet 3	1	2	3	4	5	6	7	8	9	10	Final
Team Martin	1	1	0	3	0	0	0	0	0	X	5
Sherry Anderson	0	0	5	0	1	1	0	1	1	X	9

Sheet 4	1	2	3	4	5	6	7	8	9	10	Final
Chantelle Eberle	0	0	0	0	0	1	0	2	0	X	3
Stefanie Lawton	0	1	1	1	1	0	2	0	2	X	8

=== Draw 4 ===
January 3, 4:00pm

Sheet 1	1	2	3	4	5	6	7	8	9	10	Final
Sherry Anderson	0	0	1	0	0	0	1	0	2	0	4
Robyn Silvernagle	0	1	0	1	0	0	0	2	0	3	7

Sheet 2	1	2	3	4	5	6	7	8	9	10	Final
Amber Holland	2	0	2	0	2	2	1	X	X	X	9
Stefanie Lawton	0	1	0	2	0	0	0	X	X	X	3

Sheet 3	1	2	3	4	5	6	7	8	9	10	Final
Penny Barker	0	2	0	1	0	1	1	0	1	X	6
Candace Chisholm	3	0	2	0	1	0	0	2	0	X	8

Sheet 4	1	2	3	4	5	6	7	8	9	10	Final
Ashley Howard	2	0	0	0	1	0	0	1	0	X	4
Team Martin	0	0	0	2	0	1	4	0	1	X	8

=== Draw 5 ===
January 3, 9:00pm

Sheet 1	1	2	3	4	5	6	7	8	9	10	Final
Amber Holland	1	0	0	1	0	1	0	0	2	0	5
Team Martin	0	1	1	0	2	0	1	0	0	1	6

Sheet 2	1	2	3	4	5	6	7	8	9	10	Final
Candace Chisholm	1	0	0	3	0	0	1	0	3	X	8
Ashley Howard	0	0	0	0	2	0	0	3	0	X	5

Sheet 3	1	2	3	4	5	6	7	8	9	10	Final
Chantelle Eberle	0	2	1	0	3	0	3	X	X	X	9
Sherry Anderson	0	0	0	1	0	1	0	X	X	X	2

Sheet 4	1	2	3	4	5	6	7	8	9	10	11	Final
Penny Barker	2	1	0	1	0	0	0	1	2	0	1	8
Stefanie Lawton	0	0	3	0	0	1	2	0	0	1	0	7

=== Draw 6 ===
January 4, 3:00pm

Sheet 1	1	2	3	4	5	6	7	8	9	10	Final
Penny Barker	1	0	0	1	1	0	0	2	0	1	6
Ashley Howard	0	0	0	0	0	2	0	0	1	0	3

Sheet 2	1	2	3	4	5	6	7	8	9	10	Final
Chantelle Eberle	0	0	1	1	1	1	0	1	2	X	7
Team Martin	1	0	0	0	0	0	2	0	0	X	3

Sheet 3	1	2	3	4	5	6	7	8	9	10	Final
Stefanie Lawton	1	0	0	2	0	0	0	X	X	X	3
Robyn Silvernagle	0	3	2	0	0	3	1	X	X	X	9

Sheet 4	1	2	3	4	5	6	7	8	9	10	Final
Candace Chisholm	0	1	0	2	2	2	1	X	X	X	8
Amber Holland	0	0	1	0	0	0	0	X	X	X	1

=== Draw 7 ===
January 4, 8:30pm

Sheet 1	1	2	3	4	5	6	7	8	9	10	Final
Candace Chisholm	0	0	1	0	1	1	0	0	2	0	5
Chantelle Eberle	0	2	0	2	0	0	0	1	0	1	6

Sheet 2	1	2	3	4	5	6	7	8	9	10	Final
Stefanie Lawton	0	1	0	1	0	1	0	1	0	X	4
Sherry Anderson	2	0	3	0	1	0	1	0	1	X	8

Sheet 3	1	2	3	4	5	6	7	8	9	10	Final
Penny Barker	0	1	3	0	0	1	0	1	1	X	7
Amber Holland	0	0	0	2	0	0	2	0	0	X	4

Sheet 4	1	2	3	4	5	6	7	8	9	10	Final
Team Martin	0	0	0	0	1	0	0	2	0	X	3
Robyn Silvernagle	1	1	0	2	0	0	1	0	1	X	6

=== Draw 8 ===
January 5, 3:00pm

Sheet 1	1	2	3	4	5	6	7	8	9	10	Final
Penny Barker	0	1	1	0	1	0	1	0	0	X	4
Sherry Anderson	1	0	0	3	0	2	0	1	1	X	8

Sheet 2	1	2	3	4	5	6	7	8	9	10	Final
Amber Holland	0	0	1	0	0	0	1	0	2	1	5
Robyn Silvernagle	1	1	0	2	1	0	0	1	0	0	6

Sheet 3	1	2	3	4	5	6	7	8	9	10	Final
Candace Chisholm	0	1	0	1	1	0	0	X	X	X	3
Team Martin	2	0	2	0	0	3	2	X	X	X	9

Sheet 4	1	2	3	4	5	6	7	8	9	10	Final
Chantelle Eberle	0	2	0	2	0	1	0	1	0	X	6
Ashley Howard	2	0	1	0	2	0	1	0	3	X	9

=== Draw 9 ===
January 5, 8:30pm

Sheet 1	1	2	3	4	5	6	7	8	9	10	Final
Candace Chisholm	0	1	0	2	2	0	1	0	1	0	7
Stefanie Lawton	1	0	2	0	0	2	0	2	0	1	8

Sheet 2	1	2	3	4	5	6	7	8	9	10	Final
Penny Barker	1	3	0	0	0	0	1	0	0	X	5
Chantelle Eberle	0	0	0	3	1	1	0	1	3	X	9

Sheet 3	1	2	3	4	5	6	7	8	9	10	Final
Ashley Howard	0	2	0	2	0	0	0	0	0	X	4
Robyn Silvernagle	1	0	2	0	0	2	0	0	1	X	6

Sheet 4	1	2	3	4	5	6	7	8	9	10	Final
Amber Holland	1	0	2	0	1	0	2	0	1	X	7
Sherry Anderson	0	1	0	0	0	1	0	1	0	X	3

== Tiebreaker ==
January 6, 2:00pm

Sheet 1	1	2	3	4	5	6	7	8	9	10	Final
Stefanie Lawton	1	0	0	1	0	0	1	0	0	0	3
Penny Barker	0	1	0	0	1	1	0	0	0	1	4

== Playoffs ==
Page playoff system
1	Robyn Silvernagle	8
2	Chantelle Eberle	2
3	Sherry Anderson	4
4	Penny Barker	3

Semifinal
2	Chantelle Eberle	5
3	Sherry Anderson	6

Final
1	Robyn Silvernagle	6
3	Sherry Anderson	7

=== 1 vs. 2 ===
January 6, 8:00pm

Sheet 3	1	2	3	4	5	6	7	8	9	10	Final
Robyn Silvernagle	0	0	0	0	3	1	0	1	3	X	8
Chantelle Eberle	0	0	0	0	0	0	2	0	0	X	2

=== 3 vs. 4 ===
January 6, 8:00pm

Sheet 1	1	2	3	4	5	6	7	8	9	10	Final
Sherry Anderson	1	0	0	0	1	0	0	0	0	2	4
Penny Barker	0	0	0	2	0	0	0	0	1	0	3

=== Semifinal ===
January 7, 1:00pm

Sheet 2	1	2	3	4	5	6	7	8	9	10	11	Final
Chantelle Eberle	0	1	0	0	1	0	1	0	1	1	0	5
Sherry Anderson	0	0	3	0	0	1	0	1	0	0	1	6

=== Final ===
January 7, 5:00pm

Sheet 3	1	2	3	4	5	6	7	8	9	10	11	Final
Robyn Silvernagle	2	0	0	0	2	0	1	0	0	1	0	6
Sherry Anderson	0	0	1	1	0	1	0	2	1	0	1	7

2018 Saskatchewan Scotties Tournament of Hearts

Sherry Anderson
7th Saskatchewan Provincial Championship title
