= Penny Barker =

Canadian curler (born 1985)

- Curler
- Born: Penny Roy; September 25, 1985 (age 41); Moose Jaw, Saskatchewan

Team
- Curling club: Moose Jaw Ford CC; Moose Jaw, SK
- Skip: Penny Barker
- Third: Lindsay Bertsch
- Second: Taryn Holtby
- Lead: Danielle Sicinski

Curling career
- Member Association: Saskatchewan
- Hearts: 2 (2017, 2022)
- Top CTRS ranking: 12th (2021–22)
Medal record
Women's curling
Representing Canada
World Junior Championships
Silver medal – second place	2006 Jeonju

Penny Barker (born Penny Roy on September 25, 1985) is a curler from Moose Jaw, Saskatchewan. She currently skips her own team out of the Moose Jaw Ford Curling Centre in Moose Jaw. She is a two-time Saskatchewan Scotties Tournament of Hearts provincial champion, winning the event in 2017 and 2022.

== Career ==
=== Juniors ===
Barker was the alternate on the Mandy Selzer rink that represented Canada at the 2006 World Junior Curling Championships. The team won the silver medal that year. She represented the University of Regina at five Canadian university championships, including winning a silver in 2007.

=== Women's ===
Barker began skipping a women's team in 2007, after playing third for Karen Purdy in the 2006–07 season. Barker played in her first Grand Slam of Curling event at the 2012 Colonial Square Ladies Classic. Her then rink of third Susan Lang, second Melissa Hoffman and lead Danielle Sicinski lost all three of their games in the triple knock-out tournament. Barker formed a new team in 2013 with Deanna Doig at third, Tamara Haberstock at second and Sarah Slywka at lead. They played in the 2013 Colonial Square Ladies Classic, where her team made it all the way to the quarterfinals. Barker also played in the 2011 and 2013 Saskatchewan Scotties Tournament of Hearts. At the 2011 Saskatchewan Scotties Tournament of Hearts, her team of third Amanda Craigie, second Sicinski and lead Haberstock finished the event with a 1–4 record. At the 2013 event, Barker and her team of Lang, Hoffman and Sicinski finished with a 2–3 record.

Barker began the 2014–15 season by playing in the 2014 Colonial Square Ladies Classic, failing to advance to the playoffs. She was however able to win two Saskatchewan Curling Tour events, qualifying her rink for the 2015 Saskatchewan Scotties Tournament of Hearts, where they finished 2–3. The next season, her rink of Doig, Hoffmann and Sicinski finished 3–3 at the 2016 Saskatchewan Scotties Tournament of Hearts, once again failing to advance.

Barker won the 2017 Saskatchewan Scotties Tournament of Hearts the following season despite entering the tournament as an underdog. Her team finished 4–4 through the round robin before winning the tiebreaker and three straight playoff games to claim the title. She defeated heavily favored teams Stefanie Lawton in the semifinal and Robyn Silvernagle in the final by scoring four in the tenth end. At the 2017 Scotties Tournament of Hearts, they were one of two teams making their debut appearance at the hearts and it showed as they finished the round robin with a 1–10 record, only defeating Nova Scotia's Mary Mattatall.

With her Saskatchewan Scotties championship rink Doig, Schneider and Sicinski, Barker had a good start to the 2017–18 season, winning the DEKALB Superspiel on the World Curling Tour. They also finished runner-up at the Medicine Hat Charity Classic and won two Saskatchewan Curling Tour events. She would not defend her provincial title however, losing in the 3 vs. 4 page playoff game at the 2018 Saskatchewan Scotties Tournament of Hearts to Sherry Anderson, who went on to win the event. The rink added Christie Gamble to the lineup for the 2018–19 season, replacing Schneider. They qualified for the 2019 Saskatchewan Scotties Tournament of Hearts, but failed to advance to the playoffs after a 4–4 round robin record. The team stayed intact the following season and won three more Saskatchewan Tour events. Their successful results qualified them for the 2020 Saskatchewan Scotties Tournament of Hearts, which was held in a triple knockout format this year. They qualified for the playoffs through the C side before losing to the Sherry Anderson rink in 3 vs. 4 game, like in 2018.

Following the departure of Deanna Doig, Team Barker added Jenna Enge to their lineup as their new second, moving Christie Gamble up to third on the team. Due to the COVID-19 pandemic in Saskatchewan, the 2021 Saskatchewan Scotties Tournament of Hearts was cancelled. Team Sherry Anderson was invited to represent Saskatchewan at the 2021 Scotties Tournament of Hearts, as they had the most points from the 2019–20 and 2020–21 seasons combined, which they accepted. This ended the abbreviated 2020–21 season for the Barker rink.

With their successful results over the past few seasons, Team Barker had enough points to qualify for the 2021 Canadian Olympic Curling Pre-Trials. There, the team finished with a 3–3 record, just shy of qualifying for the playoff round. On the Saskatchewan tour, the team picked up tour wins at the SaskTour Women's Moose Jaw and the SaskTour Women's Weyburn. Team Barker entered the 2022 Saskatchewan Scotties Tournament of Hearts as the second ranked team, only behind Team Chelsea Carey. In the triple knockout event, the team lost the A Qualifier game to the Carey rink before defeating Amber Holland in the B Qualifier. This qualified them for the 1 vs. 2 page playoff game which they would drop to the Carey rink. Following a win in the semifinal against Team Holland, Barker faced Carey for the third time in the championship in the provincial final. This time, Team Barker would win the match 7–5, winning the provincial title and qualifying for the 2022 Scotties Tournament of Hearts as Team Saskatchewan. At the Hearts, Barker led her team to a 4–4 round robin record, just missing out on the championship round.

Team Barker had a successful 2022–23 season tour season, allowing them to easily qualify for the 2023 Saskatchewan Scotties Tournament of Hearts. To start the season, the team played in the inaugural PointsBet Invitational where after an opening game win against Hollie Duncan, they dropped their quarterfinal game to Kaitlyn Lawes. On the Saskatchewan tour, the team won three events: the Moose Jaw SaskTour Spiel, the Regina Highland SWCT Event and the SaskTour Women's Players Championship. They also had a strong showing at the 2022 Western Showdown, reaching the quarterfinals where they lost to world champions Team Silvana Tirinzoni. Despite their tour dominance in their home province, they were not able to defend their provincial title, finishing 2–3 through the triple knockout. The following season was not as successful for the team as they were unable to win any tour titles. However, their multiple quarterfinal finishes earned them enough points to qualify directly for the 2024 Saskatchewan Scotties Tournament of Hearts. In the round robin, the team had a 3–2 record which earned them a spot in the final four. Facing Michelle Englot in the 3 vs. 4 game, they lost 9–6 and were eliminated from contention. After the season, the team disbanded.

== Personal life ==
Barker is employed as an actuarial statistician, and is the director of actuarial services pricing at SGI Canada. She is married and has two children.

== Grand Slam record ==
Key
C	Champion
F	Lost in Final
SF	Lost in Semifinal
QF	Lost in Quarterfinals
R16	Lost in the round of 16
Q	Did not advance to playoffs
T2	Played in Tier 2 event
DNP	Did not participate in event
N/A	Not a Grand Slam event that season

=== Former events ===
Event	2012–13	2013–14	2014–15
Colonial Square	Q	QF	Q

== Teams ==
Season	Skip	Third	Second	Lead
2009–10	Penny Barker	Laura Greffard	Tamara Haberstock	Danielle Sicinski
2010–11	Penny Barker	Amanda Craigle	Danielle Sicinski	Tamara Haberstock
2011–12	Penny Barker	Amanda Craigle	Danielle Sicinski	Tamara Haberstock
2012–13	Penny Barker	Susan Lang	Melissa Hoffman	Danielle Sicinski
2013–14	Penny Barker	Deanna Doig	Tamara Haberstock	Sarah Slywka
2014–15	Penny Barker	Deanna Doig	Amanda Craigle	Danielle Sicinski
2015–16	Penny Barker	Deanna Doig	Melissa Hoffman	Danielle Sicinski
2016–17	Penny Barker	Deanna Doig	Lorraine Schneider	Danielle Sicinski
2017–18	Penny Barker	Deanna Doig	Lorraine Schneider	Danielle Sicinski
2018–19	Penny Barker	Deanna Doig	Christie Gamble	Danielle Sicinski
2019–20	Penny Barker	Deanna Doig	Christie Gamble	Danielle Sicinski
2020–21	Penny Barker	Christie Gamble	Jenna Enge	Danielle Sicinski
2021–22	Penny Barker	Christie Gamble	Jenna Enge	Danielle Sicinski
2022–23	Penny Barker	Christie Gamble	Jenna Enge	Danielle Sicinski
2023–24	Penny Barker	Christie Gamble	Jenna Enge	Danielle Sicinski
2024–25	Penny Barker	Lindsay Bertsch	Taryn Schachtel	Danielle Sicinski
2025–26	Penny Barker	Lindsay Bertsch	Taryn Schachtel	Danielle Sicinski
2026–27	Penny Barker	Lindsay Bertsch	Taryn Holtby	Danielle Sicinski
