= Christie Gamble =

Canadian curler

- Curler
- Born: Christie Lang; May 22, 1986 (age 40); Regina, Saskatchewan, Canada

Team
- Curling club: Callie CC, Regina, SK
- Skip: Christie Gamble
- Third: Jenna Enge
- Second: Jade Kerr
- Lead: Jasmine Kerr

Curling career
- Member Association: Quebec (2009–2010); Nova Scotia (2010–2017); Saskatchewan (2017–present)
- Hearts: 1 (2022)
- Top CTRS ranking: 12th (2021–22)

Christie Gamble (born May 22, 1986, as Christie Lang) is a Canadian curler from Regina, Saskatchewan. She currently skips her own team. While playing third for Penny Barker, Gamble won the 2022 Saskatchewan Scotties Tournament of Hearts and went on to compete at the 2022 Scotties Tournament of Hearts.

== Career ==
Before moving to Nova Scotia, Gamble played with the Saskia Hollands rink out of Lacolle, Quebec. The team played in the 2010 Quebec Scotties Tournament of Hearts, losing in the 3 vs. 4 page playoff game. She then moved to Nova Scotia and joined the Marie Christianson rink. The team failed to qualify for the provincial championship, so Gamble moved on and joined Team Sarah Rhyno. The team qualified for the 2012 Nova Scotia Scotties Tournament of Hearts, but finished in last place in the provincial championship with a 2–5 record. The following season, the team played in their first Grand Slam of Curling event at the 2012 Colonial Square Ladies Classic where they went 1–3. After failing to qualify for the 2013 Nova Scotia Scotties Tournament of Hearts, Gamble again changed teams, joining the Mary-Anne Arsenault rink as their second, replacing Colleen Jones. The new Team Arsenault found some success on tour, finishing runner-up at both the StuSells Toronto Tankard and the Dave Jones Molson Mayflower Cashspiel. Team Arsenault also played in the 2013 Colonial Square Ladies Classic, finishing with a 4–3 record. At the 2014 Nova Scotia Scotties Tournament of Hearts, the team lost 9–8 to Kelly MacIntosh in the semifinal.

After taking a season off, Gamble created her own team for the 2015–16 season with Brigitte MacPhail, Kaitlyn Veitch and Mary Mattatall. The team did not have a great season on tour, failing to qualify for the playoffs in any of their five events. They finished with a 3–4 record at the 2016 Nova Scotia Scotties Tournament of Hearts. The team fared much better the following season on tour, reaching the final of the Jim Sullivan Curling Classic and the quarterfinals of the New Scotland Clothing Ladies Cashspiel. Despite their tour season, Team Gamble finished with a 2–5 record at the 2017 Nova Scotia Scotties Tournament of Hearts. Following the season, Gamble moved to Saskatchewan and joined the Chantelle Eberle rink at third.

Team Eberle had relative success during the 2017–18 season, qualifying for the playoffs in five of their eight events. This included winning the Highland SWCT Event and finishing runner-up at both the Boundary Ford Curling Classic and the Saskatoon Nutana SWCT Event. The team also played in the 2017 GSOC Tour Challenge, but finished with a winless 0–4 record. At the 2018 Saskatchewan Scotties Tournament of Hearts, Team Eberle finished in second place through the round robin with a 6–2 record. They then lost both the 1 vs. 2 page playoff game and the semifinal. Gamble joined Team Penny Barker at the conclusion of the season which also included third Deanna Doig and lead Danielle Sicinski.

Following a disappointing 2018–19 season, Team Barker had a very successful 2019–20 season which included winning three Saskatchewan tour events. The team won the Highland SWCT Event, the Saskatoon Nutana SWCT Event and the Moose Jaw SWCT Event. They also qualified for the playoffs in the Regina Callie Rockoberfest and the Boundary Ford Curling Classic. Their results qualified them for the 2020 Saskatchewan Scotties Tournament of Hearts, which was held in a triple knockout format this year. They qualified for the playoffs through the C side before losing to the Sherry Anderson rink in 3 vs. 4 game.

Following the departure of Deanna Doig, Team Barker added Jenna Enge to their lineup as their new second, moving Gamble up to third on the team. Due to the COVID-19 pandemic in Saskatchewan, the 2021 Saskatchewan Scotties Tournament of Hearts was cancelled. Team Sherry Anderson was invited to represent Saskatchewan at the 2021 Scotties Tournament of Hearts, as they had the most points from the 2019–20 and 2020–21 seasons combined, which they accepted. This ended the abbreviated 2020–21 season for the Barker rink.

With their results over the previous few seasons, Team Barker had enough points to qualify for the 2021 Canadian Olympic Curling Pre-Trials. There, the team finished with a 3–3 record, just shy of qualifying for the playoff round. On the Saskatchewan tour, the team picked up tour wins at the SaskTour Women's Moose Jaw and the SaskTour Women's Weyburn. Team Barker entered the 2022 Saskatchewan Scotties Tournament of Hearts as the second ranked team, only behind Team Chelsea Carey. In the triple knockout event, the team lost the A Qualifier game to the Carey rink before defeating Amber Holland in the B Qualifier. This qualified them for the 1 vs. 2 page playoff game which they would drop to the Carey rink. Following a win in the semifinal against Team Holland, Barker faced Carey for the third time in the championship in the provincial final. This time, Team Barker would win the match 7–5, winning the provincial title and qualifying for the 2022 Scotties Tournament of Hearts as Team Saskatchewan. At the Hearts, the Barker rink finished the round robin with a 4–4 record, just missing out on the championship round.

Team Barker had a successful 2022–23 season tour season, allowing them to easily qualify for the 2023 Saskatchewan Scotties Tournament of Hearts. To start the season, the team played in the inaugural PointsBet Invitational where after an opening game win against Hollie Duncan, they dropped their quarterfinal game to Kaitlyn Lawes. On the Saskatchewan tour, the team won three events: the Moose Jaw SaskTour Spiel, the Regina Highland SWCT Event and the SaskTour Women's Players Championship. They also had a strong showing at the 2022 Western Showdown, reaching the quarterfinals where they lost to world champions Team Silvana Tirinzoni. Despite their tour dominance in their home province, they were not able to defend their provincial title, finishing 2–3 through the triple knockout. The following season was not as successful for the team as they were unable to win any tour titles. However, their multiple quarterfinal finishes earned them enough points to qualify directly for the 2024 Saskatchewan Scotties Tournament of Hearts. In the round robin, the team had a 3–2 record which earned them a spot in the final four. Facing Michelle Englot in the 3 vs. 4 game, they lost 9–6 and were eliminated from contention. After the season, the team disbanded.

== Personal life ==
Gamble is employed as the vice president in sales and marketing at Greenwave Innovations. She is married to fellow curler Tyler Gamble and has two children, Brynn and Harvey. Her father Mark Lang won the 2002 SaskTel Tankard and is the coach of her team. Her brother Matt Lang won the 2011 Canadian Junior Curling Championships and represented Canada at the 2011 World Junior Curling Championships.

== Teams ==
Season	Skip	Third	Second	Lead
2009–10	Saskia Hollands	Christie Lang	France Charette	Candide Hébert
2010–11	Marie Christianson	Christie Lang	Jane Snyder	Anna Sampson
2011–12	Sarah Rhyno	Jenn Brine	Christie Lang	Shelley Barker
2012–13	Sarah Rhyno	Jenn Brine	Christie Lang	Kaitlin Fralic
2013–14	Mary-Anne Arsenault	Kim Kelly	Christie Gamble	Jenn Baxter
2015–16	Christie Gamble	Brigitte MacPhail	Kaitlyn Veitch	Mary Mattatall
2016–17	Christie Gamble	Brigitte MacPhail	Kaitlyn Veitch	Michelle Lang
2017–18	Chantelle Eberle	Christie Gamble	Larisa Murray	Haylee Jameson
2018–19	Penny Barker	Deanna Doig	Christie Gamble	Danielle Sicinski
2019–20	Penny Barker	Deanna Doig	Christie Gamble	Danielle Sicinski
2020–21	Penny Barker	Christie Gamble	Jenna Enge	Danielle Sicinski
2021–22	Penny Barker	Christie Gamble	Jenna Enge	Danielle Sicinski
2022–23	Penny Barker	Christie Gamble	Jenna Enge	Danielle Sicinski
2023–24	Penny Barker	Christie Gamble	Jenna Enge	Danielle Sicinski
2024–25	Jenna Enge	Brett Barber	Christie Gamble	Amélie Blais
2025–26	Nancy Martin	Chaelynn Stewart	Kadriana Lott	Christie Gamble
2026–27	Christie Gamble	Jenna Enge	Jade Kerr	Jasmine Kerr
