= 2014 Colonial Square Ladies Classic =

- Host city: Saskatoon, Saskatchewan
- Arena: Nutana Curling Club
- Dates: November 7–10
- Winner: (Scotland) Eve Muirhead
- Curling club: Dunkeld CC, Pitlochry
- Skip: Eve Muirhead
- Third: Anna Sloan
- Second: Vicki Adams
- Lead: Sarah Reid
- Finalist: (Ontario) Sherry Middaugh

The 2014 Colonial Square Ladies Classic was held from November 7 to 10 at the Nutana Curling Club in Saskatoon, Saskatchewan as part of the 2014–15 World Curling Tour. This was the third Grand Slam event on the women's World Curling Tour. The event was held in a triple-knockout format, and the purse was CAD$47,000, of which the winner, Eve Muirhead, received CAD$12,000. In the final, Muirhead defeated Sherry Middaugh of Ontario, scoring a game-winning deuce in the last end to make the final score 5–4.

== Teams ==
The teams are listed as follows:

Skip	Third	Second	Lead	Locale
Sherry Anderson	Sherri Singler	Marliese Kasner	Stephanie Schmidt	Saskatoon, Saskatchewan
Brett Barber	Samantha Yachiw	Meaghan Frerichs	Kaitlyn Bowman	Biggar, Saskatchewan
Penny Barker	Deanna Doig	Amanda Craigie	Danielle Sicinski	Moose Jaw, Saskatchewan
Chantelle Eberle	Cindy Ricci	Larisa Murray	Debbie Lozinski	Regina, Saskatchewan
Michelle Englot	Candace Chisholm	Ashley Howard	Kristy Johnson	Regina, Saskatchewan
Allison Flaxey	Katie Cottrill	Kristen Foster	Morgan Court	Listowel, Ontario
Shalon Fleming	Ashley Green	Marsha Munro	Michelle Chabot	Regina, Saskatchewan
Rachel Fritzler	Ashley Quick	Amy Merkosky	Alyssa Johns	Regina, Saskatchewan
Jessica Hanson	Kourtney Fesser	Krista Fesser	Brie Spilchen	Saskatoon, Saskatchewan
Janet Harvey	Cherie-Ann Sheppard	Kristin Napier	Carey Kirby	Winnipeg, Manitoba
Anna Hasselborg	Karin Rudström	Agnes Knochenhauer	Zandra Flyg	Gävle, Sweden
Michèle Jäggi	Michelle Gribi	Stéphanie Jäggi	Vera Camponovo	Bern, Switzerland
Kim Su-ji	Park Jeong-hwa	Woo Su-bin	Kim Hye-in	(South Korea) Seoul, Korea
Sarah Koltun	Chelsea Duncan	Patty Wallingham	Jenna Duncan	Whitehorse, Yukon
Kristy McDonald	Kate Cameron	Leslie Wilson-Westcott	Raunora Westcott	Winnipeg, Manitoba
Sherry Middaugh	Jo-Ann Rizzo	Lee Merklinger	Lori Eddy	Coldwater, Ontario
Eve Muirhead	Anna Sloan	Vicki Adams	Sarah Reid	Stirling, Scotland
Alina Pätz	Nadine Lehmann	Marisa Winkelhausen	Nicole Schwägli	Baden, Switzerland
Trish Paulsen	Kari Kennedy	Jenna Loder	Kari Paulsen	Saskatoon, Saskatchewan
Chelsey Peterson	Rebecca Gustafson	Brittany Wilhelm	Katie Methot	Saskatchewan
Nina Roth	Jamie Sinclair	Becca Hamilton	Tabitha Peterson	(United States) Blaine, Minnesota
Mandy Selzer	Erin Selzer	Kristen Mitchell	Sarah Slywka	Balgonie, Saskatchewan
Jill Shumay	Nancy Martin	Taryn Schachtel	Jinaye Ayrey	Maidstone, Saskatchewan
Aileen Sormunen	Tara Peterson	Vicky Persinger	Monica Walker	(United States) Blaine, Minnesota
Heather Strong	Amber Holland	Laura Strong	Carla Anaka	St. John's, Newfoundland and Labrador
Valerie Sweeting	Lori Olson-Johns	Dana Ferguson	Rachelle Pidherny	Edmonton, Alberta
Jill Thurston	Brette Richards	Briane Meilleur	Blaine de Jager	Winnipeg, Manitoba
Silvana Tirinzoni	Manuela Siegrist	Esther Neuenschwander	Marlene Albrecht	Aarau, Switzerland
Lana Vey	Alexandra Williamson	Natalie Bloomfield	Ashley Williamson	Regina, Saskatchewan
Jessie Kaufman (fourth)	Crystal Webster (skip)	Geri-Lynn Ramsay	Rebecca Konschuh	Calgary, Alberta

== Knockout Draw Brackets ==
The draw is listed as follows:

=== A Event ===
First Knockout
(Manitoba) Janet Harvey	2
(Saskatchewan) Lana Vey	6
(Ontario) Allison Flaxey	5
(Newfoundland and Labrador) Heather Strong	6
(Switzerland) Michèle Jäggi	4
(Saskatchewan) Mandy Selzer	3
(Ontario) Sherry Middaugh	7
(South Korea) Kim Su-ji	2
(United States) Nina Roth	4
(Saskatchewan) Jessica Hanson	6
(Sweden) Anna Hasselborg	10
(Saskatchewan) Penny Barker	1
(Saskatchewan) Sherry Anderson	10
(Saskatchewan) Shalon Fleming	2

Quarterfinals
(Scotland) Eve Muirhead	5
(Saskatchewan) Lana Vey	3
(Newfoundland and Labrador) Heather Strong	7
(Switzerland) Michèle Jäggi	3
(Ontario) Sherry Middaugh	7
(Saskatchewan) Jessica Hanson	4
(Sweden) Anna Hasselborg	3
(Saskatchewan) Sherry Anderson	4

Semifinals
(Scotland) Eve Muirhead	6
(Newfoundland and Labrador) Heather Strong	4
(Ontario) Sherry Middaugh	5
(Saskatchewan) Sherry Anderson	6

Qualifier 1
(Scotland) Eve Muirhead	6
(Saskatchewan) Sherry Anderson	4

First Knockout
(Switzerland) Silvana Tirinzoni	6
(Saskatchewan) Chelsey Peterson	5
(Alberta) Crystal Webster	8
(Saskatchewan) Trish Paulsen	3
(Manitoba) Kristy McDonald	3
(Yukon) Sarah Koltun	6
(Manitoba) Jill Thurston	7
(Saskatchewan) Jill Shumay	6
(Alberta) Valerie Sweeting	6
(Saskatchewan) Rachel Fritzler	2
(Saskatchewan) Michelle Englot	9
(Saskatchewan) Brett Barber	3
(Saskatchewan) Chantelle Eberle	5
(United States) Aileen Sormunen	6
(Switzerland) Alina Pätz	6
(Saskatchewan) Sherry Just	4

Quarterfinals
(Switzerland) Silvana Tirinzoni	6
(Alberta) Crystal Webster	7
(Yukon) Sarah Koltun	4
(Manitoba) Jill Thurston	6
(Alberta) Valerie Sweeting	4
(Saskatchewan) Michelle Englot	3
(United States) Aileen Sormunen	6
(Switzerland) Alina Pätz	5

Semifinals
(Alberta) Crystal Webster	7
(Manitoba) Jill Thurston	5
(Alberta) Valerie Sweeting	6
(United States) Aileen Sormunen	5

Qualifier 2
(Alberta) Crystal Webster	3
(Alberta) Valerie Sweeting	5

=== B Event ===
Second Knockout
(Ontario) Allison Flaxey	8
(Saskatchewan) Mandy Selzer	4
(South Korea) Kim Su-ji	3
(United States) Nina Roth	8
(Saskatchewan) Penny Barker	6
(Saskatchewan) Shalon Fleming	1

Quarterfinals
(Manitoba) Janet Harvey	3
(Ontario) Allison Flaxey	8
(United States) Nina Roth	6
(Saskatchewan) Penny Barker	3

Semifinals
(Ontario) Allison Flaxey	4
(Manitoba) Jill Thurston	7
(United States) Nina Roth	2
(United States) Aileen Sormunen	5

To Qualifier 3
(Manitoba) Jill Thurston	7
(United States) Aileen Sormunen	5
Qualifier 3
(Manitoba) Jill Thurston	4
(Saskatchewan) Sherry Anderson	2

Second Knockout		Semifinals		To Qualifier 3
(Switzerland) Silvana Tirinzoni	4
(Yukon) Sarah Koltun	8	(Yukon) Sarah Koltun	5
(Saskatchewan) Michelle Englot	6	(Saskatchewan) Michelle Englot	6
(Switzerland) Alina Pätz	5			(Saskatchewan) Michelle Englot	2
				(Saskatchewan) Sherry Anderson	6

Second Knockout		Semifinals		To Qualifier 4
(Saskatchewan) Lana Vey	3
(Switzerland) Michèle Jäggi	6	(Switzerland) Michèle Jäggi	4
(Saskatchewan) Jessica Hanson	4	(Sweden) Anna Hasselborg	6
(Sweden) Anna Hasselborg	6			(Sweden) Anna Hasselborg	8
				(Alberta) Crystal Webster	3

Second Knockout
(Saskatchewan) Chelsey Peterson	2
(Saskatchewan) Trish Paulsen	7
(Manitoba) Kristy McDonald	7
(Saskatchewan) Jill Shumay	2
(Saskatchewan) Rachel Fritzler	6
(Saskatchewan) Brett Barber	8
(Saskatchewan) Chantelle Eberle	9
(Saskatchewan) Sherry Just	1

Quarterfinals
(Saskatchewan) Trish Paulsen	2
(Manitoba) Kristy McDonald	5
(Saskatchewan) Brett Barber	1
(Saskatchewan) Chantelle Eberle	7

Semifinals
(Newfoundland and Labrador) Heather Strong	4
(Manitoba) Kristy McDonald	2
(Ontario) Sherry Middaugh	6
(Saskatchewan) Chantelle Eberle	5

To Qualifier 4
(Newfoundland and Labrador) Heather Strong	4
(Ontario) Sherry Middaugh	8
Qualifier 4
(Sweden) Anna Hasselborg	6
(Ontario) Sherry Middaugh	5

=== C Event ===
Second Knockout		Semifinals		Qualifier 5
(Switzerland) Michèle Jäggi	1
(Saskatchewan) Mandy Selzer	6	(Saskatchewan) Mandy Selzer	4
(Manitoba) Kristy McDonald	5	(Manitoba) Kristy McDonald	5
(Saskatchewan) Chantelle Eberle	3			(Manitoba) Kristy McDonald	6
				(Saskatchewan) Sherry Anderson	5

Third Knockout
(South Korea) Kim Su-ji	6
(Saskatchewan) Shalon Fleming	0
(Manitoba) Janet Harvey	1
(Saskatchewan) Penny Barker	8

Quarterfinals
(South Korea) Kim Su-ji	5
(Switzerland) Silvana Tirinzoni	7
(Switzerland) Alina Pätz	7
(Saskatchewan) Penny Barker	4

Semifinals
(Switzerland) Silvana Tirinzoni	7
(Alberta) Crystal Webster	2
(Switzerland) Alina Pätz	7
(Newfoundland and Labrador) Heather Strong	2

Qualifier 6
(Switzerland) Silvana Tirinzoni	5
(Switzerland) Alina Pätz	3

Third Knockout
(Saskatchewan) Trish Paulsen	5
(Saskatchewan) Brett Barber	3
(Saskatchewan) Chelsey Peterson	4
(Saskatchewan) Jill Shumay	9

Quarterfinals
(Saskatchewan) Lana Vey	4
(Saskatchewan) Trish Paulsen	7
(Saskatchewan) Jessica Hanson	8
(Saskatchewan) Jill Shumay	6

Semifinals
(Saskatchewan) Trish Paulsen	4
(United States) Aileen Sormunen	5
(Saskatchewan) Jessica Hanson	6
(Saskatchewan) Michelle Englot	7

Qualifier 7
(United States) Aileen Sormunen	4
(Saskatchewan) Michelle Englot	2

Third Knockout
(Saskatchewan) Rachel Fritzler	7
(Saskatchewan) Sherry Just	5

Quarterfinals
(Ontario) Allison Flaxey	3
(United States) Nina Roth	8
(Yukon) Sarah Koltun	7
(Saskatchewan) Rachel Fritzler	2

Semifinals
(United States) Nina Roth	7
(Yukon) Sarah Koltun	4

Qualifier 8
(United States) Nina Roth	5
(Ontario) Sherry Middaugh	6

== Playoffs ==
Quarterfinals
(Scotland) Eve Muirhead	5
(Manitoba) Kristy McDonald	4
(Sweden) Anna Hasselborg	2
(Switzerland) Silvana Tirinzoni	4
(Alberta) Valerie Sweeting	1
(United States) Aileen Sormunen	5
(Manitoba) Jill Thurston	5
(Ontario) Sherry Middaugh	6

Semifinals
(Scotland) Eve Muirhead	7
(Switzerland) Silvana Tirinzoni	1
(United States) Aileen Sormunen	6
(Ontario) Sherry Middaugh	7

Final
(Scotland) Eve Muirhead	5
(Ontario) Sherry Middaugh	4

=== Quarterfinals ===
Monday, November 10, 9:00 am

Team	1	2	3	4	5	6	7	8	Final
(Scotland) Eve Muirhead 🔨	1	0	0	1	0	1	1	1	5
(Manitoba) Kristy McDonald	0	1	1	0	2	0	0	0	4

Team	1	2	3	4	5	6	7	8	Final
(Sweden) Anna Hasselborg 🔨	1	0	0	0	1	0	0	X	2
(Switzerland) Silvana Tirinzoni	0	0	1	0	0	2	1	X	4

Team	1	2	3	4	5	6	7	8	Final
(Alberta) Valerie Sweeting 🔨	0	0	0	0	0	1	0	X	1
(United States) Aileen Sormunen	1	0	2	0	1	0	1	X	5

Team	1	2	3	4	5	6	7	8	Final
(Manitoba) Jill Thurston 🔨	0	1	0	2	0	1	0	1	5
(Ontario) Sherry Middaugh	1	0	1	0	2	0	2	0	6

=== Semifinals ===
Monday, November 10, 12:00 pm

Team	1	2	3	4	5	6	7	8	Final
(Scotland) Eve Muirhead 🔨	2	0	0	5	X	X	X	X	7
(Switzerland) Silvana Tirinzoni	0	0	1	0	X	X	X	X	1

Team	1	2	3	4	5	6	7	8	Final
(United States) Aileen Sormunen	0	2	0	1	1	0	2	0	6
(Ontario) Sherry Middaugh 🔨	2	0	3	0	0	1	0	1	7

=== Final ===
Monday, November 10, 3:00 pm

Team	1	2	3	4	5	6	7	8	Final
(Scotland) Eve Muirhead 🔨	0	2	0	0	0	1	0	2	5
(Ontario) Sherry Middaugh	0	0	0	2	0	0	2	0	4
