= 2017 Saskatchewan Scotties Tournament of Hearts =

- Host city: Melville, Saskatchewan
- Arena: Horizon Credit Union Centre
- Dates: January 24–29
- Winner: Team Barker
- Curling club: Moose Jaw Ford CC, Moose Jaw
- Skip: Penny Barker
- Third: Deanna Doig
- Second: Lorraine Schneider
- Lead: Danielle Sicinski
- Finalist: Robyn Silvernagle

The 2017 Viterra Saskatchewan Scotties Tournament of Hearts, the provincial women's curling championship of Saskatchewan was held from January 24–29 at the Horizon Credit Union Centre in Melville. The winning Penny Barker team represented Saskatchewan at the 2017 Scotties Tournament of Hearts in St. Catharines, Ontario.

Moose Jaw's Penny Barker won her first provincial women's title, sealing the victory after a hit for four points in the final, defeating North Battleford's Robyn Silvernagle. The Barker rink was ranked 7th going into the tournament, and only made the playoffs after winning a tiebreaker match. She then won three straight playoff games to claim the title. The 2017 Scotties Tournament of Hearts will be the first national championship for all four members of the Barker rink. The team is the first Moose Jaw-based team to win the provincial title since 1999.

Dayna Demers, third for the Silvernagle rink won the Marj Mitchell Award for sportsmanship and competitiveness.

== Teams ==
Notably absent from the 2017 Saskatchewan Scotties is the defending champion Jolene Campbell rink. She failed to qualify for provincials after a 1-3 record at the "last chance" event. The top seed in the event was the Chantelle Eberle rink, who was ranked 38th on the World Curling Tour money list. The top Saskatchewan team on the WCT money list was 4-time provincial champion Sherry Anderson who got the second seed. The event also included 4-time provincial champion Stefanie Lawton.

The teams are listed as follows:

Skip	Third	Second	Lead	Club(s)
Sherry Anderson	Jessica Hanson	Krista Fesser	Brie Spilchen	Nutana Curling Club, Saskatoon
Brett Barber	Sherry Just	Colleen Ackerman	Rachel Fritzler	Biggar Curling Club, Biggar
Penny Barker	Deanna Doig	Lorraine Schneider	Danielle Sicinski	Moose Jaw Ford Curling Centre, Moose Jaw
Chantelle Eberle	Kristie Moore	Larisa Murray	Debbie Lozinski	Callie Curling Club, Regina
Stefanie Lawton	Beth Iskiw	Sherri Singler	Jessica Illes	Nutana Curling Club, Saskatoon
Nancy Martin	Ashley Quick	Meaghan Frerichs	Teresa Waterfield	Nutana Curling Club, Saskatoon
Mandy Selzer	Erin Selzer	Megan Selzer	Sarah Slywka	Balgonie Curling Club, Balgonie
Robyn Silvernagle	Dayna Demers	Cristina Goertzen	Kara Thevenot	Twin Rivers Curling Club, North Battleford
Kim Schneider	Shalon Flemming	Natalie Bloomfield	Kristy Johnson	Kronau Curling Club, Kronau

== Round-robin standings ==
Key
Teams to Playoffs
Teams to Tiebreakers

	W	L
Silvernagle	7	1
Lawton	6	2
Martin	5	3
Barker	4	4
Barber	4	4
Eberle	3	5
Anderson	3	5
Selzer	3	5
Schneider	1	7

== Scores ==
Draw 1

- Silvernagle 7-6 Anderson
- Eberle 8-5 Selzer
- Lawton 9-5 Martin
- Barber 7-6 Schneider

Draw 2

- Selzer 10-5 Martin
- Lawton 10-7 Barber
- Barker 9-8 Anderson
- Silvernagle 6-4 Eberle

Draw 3

- Lawton 8-6 Barker
- Silvernagle 6-5 Schneider
- Barber 4-3 Selzer
- Martin 8-7 Anderson

Draw 4

- Silvernagle 9-1 Barber
- Martin 6-4 Barker
- Eberle 10-3 Schneider
- Selzer 5-4 Lawton

Draw 5

- Barker 9-3 Selzer
- Lawton 8-4 Schneider
- Barber 12-4 Anderson
- Martin 6-5 Eberle

Draw 6

- Lawton 8-3 Eberle
- Anderson 9-5 Selzer
- Martin 5-3 Silvernagle
- Schneider 8-7 Barker

Draw 7

- Anderson 8-3 Schneider
- Barber 7-6 Martin
- Barker 7-4 Eberle
- Silvernagle 7-6 Selzer

Draw 8

- Eberle 11-4 Barber
- Silvernagle 6-5 Barker
- Selzer 11-6 Schneider
- Lawton 10-7 Anderson

Draw 9

- Martin 9-5 Schneider
- Anderson 10-4 Eberle
- Silvernagle 8-2 Lawton
- Barker 8-6 Barber

Tiebreaker

- Barker 9-3 Barber

== Playoffs ==
Page playoff system
1	Robyn Silvernagle	9
2	Stefanie Lawton	7
3	Nancy Martin	6
4	Penny Barker	8

Semifinal
2	Stefanie Lawton	6
4	Penny Barker	8

Final
1	Robyn Silvernagle	7
4	Penny Barker	10

=== 1 vs. 2 ===
Saturday, January 28, 8:00pm

Sheet 3	1	2	3	4	5	6	7	8	9	10	11	Final
Stefanie Lawton	0	1	0	0	0	1	3	0	0	2	0	7
Robyn Silvernagle	1	0	2	1	2	0	0	1	0	0	2	9

=== 3 vs. 4 ===
Saturday, January 28, 8:00pm

Sheet 3	1	2	3	4	5	6	7	8	9	10	Final
Penny Barker	0	1	0	0	0	1	0	3	1	2	8
Nancy Martin	1	0	0	1	0	0	4	0	0	0	6

=== Semifinal ===
Sunday, January 29, 1:00pm

Sheet 2	1	2	3	4	5	6	7	8	9	10	Final
Penny Barker	0	1	0	0	0	3	0	0	1	3	8
Stefanie Lawton	2	0	0	0	1	0	2	1	0	0	6

=== Final ===
Sunday, January 29, 6:00pm

Sheet 3	1	2	3	4	5	6	7	8	9	10	Final
Penny Barker	1	2	1	0	1	0	0	1	0	4	10
Robyn Silvernagle	0	0	0	2	0	1	1	0	3	0	7

2017 Saskatchewan Scotties Tournament of Hearts

Penny Barker
1st Saskatchewan Provincial Championship title
