= 2022 Saskatchewan Scotties Tournament of Hearts =

2022 Viterra Scotties Women's Provincial Championship
- Host city: Assiniboia, Saskatchewan
- Arena: Assiniboia Curling Club
- Dates: January 5–9
- Winner: Team Barker
- Curling club: Moose Jaw Ford CC, Moose Jaw
- Skip: Penny Barker
- Third: Christie Gamble
- Second: Jenna Enge
- Lead: Danielle Sicinski
- Coach: Mark Lang
- Finalist: Chelsea Carey

The 2022 Viterra Saskatchewan Scotties Tournament of Hearts, the provincial women's curling championship for Saskatchewan, was held from January 5 to 9 at the Assiniboia Curling Club in Assiniboia, Saskatchewan. The winning Penny Barker team represented Saskatchewan at the 2022 Scotties Tournament of Hearts in Thunder Bay, Ontario.

== Qualification process ==
| Qualification method | Berths | Qualifying team(s) |
|---|---|---|
| Sask CTRS Leaders | 4 | Penny Barker; Michelle Englot; Brett Barber; Jessica Mitchell |
| CTRS Leaders | 4 | Chelsea Carey; Amber Holland; Robyn Silvernagle; Sherry Anderson |
| Last Chance Qualifier | 4 | Ashley Howard; Lorraine Schneider; Stasia Wisniewski; Krista Ellingson |

== Teams ==
The teams are listed as follows:

| Skip | Third | Second | Lead | Alternate | Club |
|---|---|---|---|---|---|
| Sherry Anderson | Nancy Martin | Chaelynn Kitz | Breanne Knapp | | Martensville CC, Martensville |
| Brett Barber | Alyssa Kostyk | Krystal Englot | Mackenzie Schwartz | | Biggar CC, Biggar |
| Penny Barker | Christie Gamble | Jenna Enge | Danielle Sicinski | | Moose Jaw Ford CC, Moose Jaw |
| Chelsea Carey | Jolene Campbell | Stephanie Schmidt | Jennifer Armstrong | Rachel Erickson | Highland CC, Regina |
| Krista Ellingson | Charity McLeod | Ellen Redlick | Brett Day | | Nutana CC, Saskatoon |
| Michelle Englot | Sara England | Shelby Brandt | Nicole Bender | | Highland CC, Regina |
| Amber Holland | Kim Schneider | Karlee Korchinski | Debbie Lozinski | | Kronau CC, Kronau |
| Ashley Howard | Kourtney Fesser | Krista Fesser | Kaylin Skinner | | Sutherland CC, Saskatoon |
| Jessica Mitchell | Jenna Hope | Meaghan Frerichs | Teresa Waterfield | | Sutherland CC, Saskatoon |
| Lorraine Schneider | Larisa Murray | Ashley Williamson | Jill de Gooijer | | Highland CC, Regina |
| Robyn Silvernagle | Kristen Streifel | Jessie Hunkin | Dayna Demers | | Twin Rivers CC, North Battleford |
| Stasia Wisniewski | Chantel Martin | Amanda Kuzyk | Sheri Martin | | Highland CC, Regina |

== Knockout brackets ==
=== A event ===
First Knockout | Qualifier 1
Chelsea Carey | 11
Jessica Mitchell | 8 | Jessica Mitchell | 4
Ashley Howard | 3 | Chelsea Carey | 10
Amber Holland | 4
Amber Holland | 8
Michelle Englot | 8 | Michelle Englot | 4
Krista Ellingson | 1 | Chelsea Carey | 6
Penny Barker | 4
Penny Barker | 8
Brett Barber | 5 | Brett Barber | 6
Lorraine Schneider | 4 | Penny Barker | 6
Sherry Anderson | 5
Robyn Silvernagle | 7
Sherry Anderson | 11 | Sherry Anderson | 10
Stasia Wisniewski | 6

=== B event ===
Second Knockout | Qualifier 2
Ashley Howard | 7
Michelle Englot | 3 | Ashley Howard | 7
Sherry Anderson | 5
Ashley Howard | 4
Krista Ellingson | 9 | Amber Holland | 6
Brett Barber | 8 | Krista Ellingson | 6
Amber Holland | 8
Amber Holland | 7
Lorraine Schneider | 5 | Penny Barker | 8
Robyn Silvernagle | 7 | Robyn Silvernagle | 9
Stasia Wisniewski | 6 | Stasia Wisniewski | 7
Jessica Mitchell | 2 | Robyn Silvernagle | 4
Penny Barker | 6

=== C event ===
Third Knockout | Qualifier 3
Michelle Englot | 7
Brett Barber | 2 | Michelle Englot | 6
Robyn Silvernagle | 11
Robyn Silvernagle | 7
Ashley Howard | 6
Stasia Wisniewski | 3
Ashley Howard | 10

| Third Knockout | | | | Qualifier 4 |
| Lorraine Schneider | 3 |
| Sherry Anderson | 10 | Sherry Anderson | 7 |
| Jessica Mitchell | 7 | Jessica Mitchell | 5 |
| Krista Ellingson | 6 | | | Sherry Anderson | 6 |
| | | | | Amber Holland | 7 |

== Knockout results ==
All draw times listed in Central Time (UTC−06:00).

=== Draw 1 ===
Wednesday, January 5, 7:30 pm

| Sheet 1 | 1 | 2 | 3 | 4 | 5 | 6 | 7 | 8 | 9 | 10 | Final |
|---|---|---|---|---|---|---|---|---|---|---|---|
| Sherry Anderson | 0 | 3 | 0 | 0 | 3 | 0 | 2 | 0 | 3 | X | 11 |
| Stasia Wisniewski | 0 | 0 | 2 | 1 | 0 | 2 | 0 | 1 | 0 | X | 6 |

| Sheet 2 | 1 | 2 | 3 | 4 | 5 | 6 | 7 | 8 | 9 | 10 | Final |
|---|---|---|---|---|---|---|---|---|---|---|---|
| Jessica Mitchell | 0 | 0 | 0 | 1 | 0 | 1 | 0 | 3 | 3 | X | 8 |
| Ashley Howard | 1 | 0 | 0 | 0 | 1 | 0 | 1 | 0 | 0 | X | 3 |

| Sheet 3 | 1 | 2 | 3 | 4 | 5 | 6 | 7 | 8 | 9 | 10 | Final |
|---|---|---|---|---|---|---|---|---|---|---|---|
| Brett Barber | 0 | 0 | 0 | 0 | 0 | 1 | 3 | 0 | 0 | 1 | 5 |
| Lorraine Schneider | 0 | 1 | 0 | 0 | 1 | 0 | 0 | 2 | 0 | 0 | 4 |

| Sheet 4 | 1 | 2 | 3 | 4 | 5 | 6 | 7 | 8 | 9 | 10 | Final |
|---|---|---|---|---|---|---|---|---|---|---|---|
| Michelle Englot | 1 | 0 | 1 | 1 | 2 | 0 | 1 | 2 | X | X | 8 |
| Krista Ellingson | 0 | 0 | 0 | 0 | 0 | 1 | 0 | 0 | X | X | 1 |

=== Draw 2 ===
Thursday, January 6, 9:00 am

| Sheet 1 | 1 | 2 | 3 | 4 | 5 | 6 | 7 | 8 | 9 | 10 | Final |
|---|---|---|---|---|---|---|---|---|---|---|---|
| Penny Barker | 2 | 0 | 0 | 2 | 2 | 0 | 0 | 0 | 2 | X | 8 |
| Brett Barber | 0 | 2 | 1 | 0 | 0 | 1 | 1 | 1 | 0 | X | 6 |

| Sheet 2 | 1 | 2 | 3 | 4 | 5 | 6 | 7 | 8 | 9 | 10 | Final |
|---|---|---|---|---|---|---|---|---|---|---|---|
| Amber Holland | 2 | 0 | 0 | 1 | 0 | 1 | 1 | 0 | 2 | 1 | 8 |
| Michelle Englot | 0 | 1 | 0 | 0 | 1 | 0 | 0 | 2 | 0 | 0 | 4 |

| Sheet 3 | 1 | 2 | 3 | 4 | 5 | 6 | 7 | 8 | 9 | 10 | Final |
|---|---|---|---|---|---|---|---|---|---|---|---|
| Robyn Silvernagle | 0 | 2 | 0 | 3 | 0 | 1 | 0 | 1 | 0 | 0 | 7 |
| Sherry Anderson | 1 | 0 | 2 | 0 | 2 | 0 | 2 | 0 | 2 | 1 | 10 |

| Sheet 4 | 1 | 2 | 3 | 4 | 5 | 6 | 7 | 8 | 9 | 10 | Final |
|---|---|---|---|---|---|---|---|---|---|---|---|
| Chelsea Carey | 0 | 2 | 0 | 4 | 0 | 2 | 3 | X | X | X | 11 |
| Jessica Mitchell | 1 | 0 | 2 | 0 | 1 | 0 | 0 | X | X | X | 4 |

=== Draw 3 ===
Thursday, January 6, 3:00 pm

| Sheet 1 | 1 | 2 | 3 | 4 | 5 | 6 | 7 | 8 | 9 | 10 | Final |
|---|---|---|---|---|---|---|---|---|---|---|---|
| Ashley Howard | 0 | 2 | 1 | 0 | 2 | 1 | 1 | X | X | X | 7 |
| Michelle Englot | 1 | 0 | 0 | 2 | 0 | 0 | 0 | X | X | X | 3 |

| Sheet 3 | 1 | 2 | 3 | 4 | 5 | 6 | 7 | 8 | 9 | 10 | Final |
|---|---|---|---|---|---|---|---|---|---|---|---|
| Krista Ellingson | 2 | 0 | 1 | 1 | 0 | 1 | 0 | 2 | 0 | 2 | 9 |
| Brett Barber | 0 | 2 | 0 | 0 | 2 | 0 | 2 | 0 | 2 | 0 | 8 |

=== Draw 4 ===
Thursday, January 6, 7:30 pm

| Sheet 1 | 1 | 2 | 3 | 4 | 5 | 6 | 7 | 8 | 9 | 10 | Final |
|---|---|---|---|---|---|---|---|---|---|---|---|
| Chelsea Carey | 1 | 0 | 2 | 3 | 1 | 0 | 3 | 0 | X | X | 10 |
| Amber Holland | 0 | 1 | 0 | 0 | 0 | 1 | 0 | 2 | X | X | 4 |

| Sheet 2 | 1 | 2 | 3 | 4 | 5 | 6 | 7 | 8 | 9 | 10 | Final |
|---|---|---|---|---|---|---|---|---|---|---|---|
| Penny Barker | 0 | 0 | 3 | 0 | 2 | 0 | 0 | 0 | 0 | 1 | 6 |
| Sherry Anderson | 0 | 1 | 0 | 1 | 0 | 1 | 1 | 0 | 1 | 0 | 5 |

| Sheet 3 | 1 | 2 | 3 | 4 | 5 | 6 | 7 | 8 | 9 | 10 | Final |
|---|---|---|---|---|---|---|---|---|---|---|---|
| Stasia Wisniewski | 0 | 1 | 1 | 1 | 2 | 0 | 0 | 0 | 1 | X | 6 |
| Jessica Mitchell | 0 | 0 | 0 | 0 | 0 | 0 | 1 | 1 | 0 | X | 2 |

| Sheet 4 | 1 | 2 | 3 | 4 | 5 | 6 | 7 | 8 | 9 | 10 | Final |
|---|---|---|---|---|---|---|---|---|---|---|---|
| Lorraine Schneider | 0 | 1 | 0 | 1 | 0 | 2 | 0 | 1 | 0 | 0 | 5 |
| Robyn Silvernagle | 0 | 0 | 2 | 0 | 1 | 0 | 1 | 0 | 2 | 1 | 7 |

=== Draw 5 ===
Friday, January 7, 10:00 am

| Sheet 2 | 1 | 2 | 3 | 4 | 5 | 6 | 7 | 8 | 9 | 10 | Final |
|---|---|---|---|---|---|---|---|---|---|---|---|
| Krista Ellingson | 1 | 0 | 2 | 2 | 1 | 0 | 0 | 0 | 0 | 0 | 6 |
| Amber Holland | 0 | 1 | 0 | 0 | 0 | 1 | 2 | 1 | 1 | 2 | 8 |

| Sheet 4 | 1 | 2 | 3 | 4 | 5 | 6 | 7 | 8 | 9 | 10 | Final |
|---|---|---|---|---|---|---|---|---|---|---|---|
| Ashley Howard | 0 | 2 | 0 | 0 | 0 | 2 | 2 | 1 | 0 | X | 7 |
| Sherry Anderson | 1 | 0 | 0 | 1 | 2 | 0 | 0 | 0 | 1 | X | 5 |

=== Draw 6 ===
Friday, January 7, 3:00 pm

| Sheet 2 | 1 | 2 | 3 | 4 | 5 | 6 | 7 | 8 | 9 | 10 | Final |
|---|---|---|---|---|---|---|---|---|---|---|---|
| Robyn Silvernagle | 1 | 0 | 0 | 1 | 3 | 0 | 2 | 0 | 0 | 2 | 9 |
| Stasia Wisniewski | 0 | 1 | 2 | 0 | 0 | 2 | 0 | 2 | 0 | 0 | 7 |

| Sheet 3 | 1 | 2 | 3 | 4 | 5 | 6 | 7 | 8 | 9 | 10 | Final |
|---|---|---|---|---|---|---|---|---|---|---|---|
| Chelsea Carey | 0 | 0 | 3 | 0 | 1 | 0 | 0 | 1 | 0 | 2 | 7 |
| Penny Barker | 2 | 0 | 0 | 1 | 0 | 1 | 0 | 0 | 0 | 0 | 4 |

| Sheet 4 | 1 | 2 | 3 | 4 | 5 | 6 | 7 | 8 | 9 | 10 | Final |
|---|---|---|---|---|---|---|---|---|---|---|---|
| Michelle Englot | 1 | 1 | 1 | 1 | 0 | 1 | 0 | 2 | X | X | 7 |
| Brett Barber | 0 | 0 | 0 | 0 | 1 | 0 | 1 | 0 | X | X | 2 |

=== Draw 7 ===
Friday, January 7, 7:30 pm

| Sheet 1 | 1 | 2 | 3 | 4 | 5 | 6 | 7 | 8 | 9 | 10 | Final |
|---|---|---|---|---|---|---|---|---|---|---|---|
| Robyn Silvernagle | 1 | 0 | 1 | 0 | 1 | 0 | 0 | 1 | 0 | 0 | 4 |
| Penny Barker | 0 | 1 | 0 | 1 | 0 | 2 | 0 | 0 | 0 | 2 | 6 |

| Sheet 2 | 1 | 2 | 3 | 4 | 5 | 6 | 7 | 8 | 9 | 10 | Final |
|---|---|---|---|---|---|---|---|---|---|---|---|
| Lorraine Schneider | 0 | 1 | 0 | 1 | 0 | 1 | 0 | 0 | X | X | 3 |
| Sherry Anderson | 4 | 0 | 2 | 0 | 1 | 0 | 1 | 2 | X | X | 10 |

| Sheet 3 | 1 | 2 | 3 | 4 | 5 | 6 | 7 | 8 | 9 | 10 | Final |
|---|---|---|---|---|---|---|---|---|---|---|---|
| Ashley Howard | 0 | 0 | 0 | 0 | 1 | 1 | 1 | 0 | 1 | X | 4 |
| Amber Holland | 0 | 1 | 1 | 1 | 0 | 0 | 0 | 3 | 0 | X | 6 |

| Sheet 4 | 1 | 2 | 3 | 4 | 5 | 6 | 7 | 8 | 9 | 10 | Final |
|---|---|---|---|---|---|---|---|---|---|---|---|
| Jessica Mitchell | 0 | 2 | 0 | 0 | 2 | 0 | 2 | 0 | 0 | 1 | 7 |
| Krista Ellingson | 0 | 0 | 1 | 1 | 0 | 1 | 0 | 2 | 1 | 0 | 6 |

=== Draw 8 ===
Saturday, January 8, 10:00 am

| Sheet 1 | 1 | 2 | 3 | 4 | 5 | 6 | 7 | 8 | 9 | 10 | Final |
|---|---|---|---|---|---|---|---|---|---|---|---|
| Sherry Anderson | 0 | 0 | 3 | 0 | 1 | 0 | 2 | 0 | 0 | 1 | 7 |
| Jessica Mitchell | 0 | 0 | 0 | 2 | 0 | 1 | 0 | 1 | 1 | 0 | 5 |

| Sheet 2 | 1 | 2 | 3 | 4 | 5 | 6 | 7 | 8 | 9 | 10 | Final |
|---|---|---|---|---|---|---|---|---|---|---|---|
| Amber Holland | 0 | 2 | 1 | 0 | 2 | 1 | 0 | 0 | 1 | 0 | 7 |
| Penny Barker | 2 | 0 | 0 | 2 | 0 | 0 | 1 | 1 | 0 | 2 | 8 |

| Sheet 3 | 1 | 2 | 3 | 4 | 5 | 6 | 7 | 8 | 9 | 10 | Final |
|---|---|---|---|---|---|---|---|---|---|---|---|
| Michelle Englot | 1 | 0 | 2 | 0 | 2 | 0 | 1 | 0 | 0 | X | 6 |
| Robyn Silvernagle | 0 | 1 | 0 | 3 | 0 | 2 | 0 | 2 | 3 | X | 11 |

| Sheet 4 | 1 | 2 | 3 | 4 | 5 | 6 | 7 | 8 | 9 | 10 | Final |
|---|---|---|---|---|---|---|---|---|---|---|---|
| Stasia Wisniewski | 0 | 1 | 0 | 0 | 2 | 0 | 0 | X | X | X | 3 |
| Ashley Howard | 2 | 0 | 0 | 5 | 0 | 2 | 1 | X | X | X | 10 |

=== Draw 9 ===
Saturday, January 8, 3:00 pm

| Sheet 2 | 1 | 2 | 3 | 4 | 5 | 6 | 7 | 8 | 9 | 10 | Final |
|---|---|---|---|---|---|---|---|---|---|---|---|
| Robyn Silvernagle | 0 | 0 | 0 | 2 | 2 | 0 | 1 | 0 | 1 | 1 | 7 |
| Ashley Howard | 0 | 2 | 0 | 0 | 0 | 1 | 0 | 3 | 0 | 0 | 6 |

| Sheet 3 | 1 | 2 | 3 | 4 | 5 | 6 | 7 | 8 | 9 | 10 | 11 | Final |
|---|---|---|---|---|---|---|---|---|---|---|---|---|
| Sherry Anderson | 0 | 1 | 0 | 3 | 1 | 0 | 1 | 0 | 0 | 0 | 0 | 6 |
| Amber Holland | 1 | 0 | 1 | 0 | 0 | 1 | 0 | 1 | 1 | 1 | 1 | 7 |

== Playoffs ==
Page playoff system
A | Chelsea Carey | 10
B | Penny Barker | 9
C1 | Robyn Silvernagle | 5
C2 | Amber Holland | 6

Semifinal
B | Penny Barker | 4
C2 | Amber Holland | 3

Final
A | Chelsea Carey | 5
B | Penny Barker | 7

=== A vs. B ===
Saturday, January 8, 7:30 pm

| Sheet 3 | 1 | 2 | 3 | 4 | 5 | 6 | 7 | 8 | 9 | 10 | Final |
|---|---|---|---|---|---|---|---|---|---|---|---|
| Chelsea Carey | 2 | 0 | 1 | 2 | 0 | 3 | 0 | 1 | 0 | 1 | 10 |
| Penny Barker | 0 | 2 | 0 | 0 | 2 | 0 | 2 | 0 | 3 | 0 | 9 |

=== C1 vs. C2 ===
Saturday, January 8, 7:30 pm

| Sheet 1 | 1 | 2 | 3 | 4 | 5 | 6 | 7 | 8 | 9 | 10 | Final |
|---|---|---|---|---|---|---|---|---|---|---|---|
| Robyn Silvernagle | 0 | 0 | 0 | 1 | 0 | 0 | 2 | 1 | 1 | 0 | 5 |
| Amber Holland | 0 | 2 | 0 | 0 | 2 | 1 | 0 | 0 | 0 | 1 | 6 |

=== Semifinal ===
Sunday, January 9, 10:00 am

| Sheet 2 | 1 | 2 | 3 | 4 | 5 | 6 | 7 | 8 | 9 | 10 | 11 | Final |
|---|---|---|---|---|---|---|---|---|---|---|---|---|
| Penny Barker | 0 | 0 | 1 | 1 | 0 | 0 | 0 | 1 | 0 | 0 | 1 | 4 |
| Amber Holland | 0 | 1 | 0 | 0 | 0 | 1 | 0 | 0 | 1 | 0 | 0 | 3 |

=== Final ===
Sunday, January 9, 3:00 pm

| Sheet 3 | 1 | 2 | 3 | 4 | 5 | 6 | 7 | 8 | 9 | 10 | Final |
|---|---|---|---|---|---|---|---|---|---|---|---|
| Chelsea Carey | 0 | 2 | 0 | 0 | 0 | 1 | 1 | 0 | 1 | X | 5 |
| Penny Barker | 1 | 0 | 2 | 1 | 1 | 0 | 0 | 2 | 0 | X | 7 |

2022 Saskatchewan Scotties Tournament of Hearts

Penny Barker
2nd Saskatchewan Provincial Championship title
