= 2006 Trail Appliances Autumn Gold Curling Classic =

World Curling Tour event

The 2006 Trail Appliances Autumn Gold Curling Classic was the 29th annual edition of the event. It marked the first Grand Slam event of the Women's World Curling Tour. It was also the first ever women's Grand Slam event to be held, as it was the first season for the women's Grand Slam. It joined the Wayden Transportation Classic, the Casinos of Winnipeg Classic and the Players' Championship as the four women's Slams of the 2006–07 curling season. The event was held October 6-9 at the Calgary Curling Club in Calgary, Alberta. The total purse for the event was $51,000 with $14,000 going to the winning team of Kelly Scott, Jeanna Schraeder, Sasha Carter and Renee Simons. The defending Canadian champion Scott rink beat Crystal Webster's rink, 8–5 in the final. This snapped a six-game winning steak for Team Webster, who lost the game after giving up steals of two and three in the seventh and eighth ends, respectively. With the loss, Webster's team took home $11,000.

== Teams ==
The teams are listed as follows:

Skip	Third	Second	Lead	Locale
Sherry Anderson	Kim Hodson	Heather Walsh	Donna Gignac	Delisle, Saskatchewan
Glenys Bakker	Allison Earl	Shannon Nimmo	Barb Davies	Calgary, Alberta
Cheryl Bernard	Susan O'Connor	Carolyn Darbyshire	Cori Bartel	Calgary, Alberta
Renelle Bryden	Nancy Smith	Jody McNabb	Shannon Mattheis	Calgary, Alberta
Diane Foster	Andrea Wilson	Jane Shupe	Jacqueline Brett	Calgary, Alberta
LaDawn Funk	Lori Bellows	Laurelle Funk	Tamara Krause	Calgary, Alberta
Brittany Gregor	Hayley Pattison	Katrine Fisette	Heather Hansen	Calgary, Alberta
Jenn Hanna	Chrissy Cadorin	Joelle Sabourin	Stephanie Hanna	Ottawa, Ontario
Janet Harvey	Jill Thurston	Cherie-Ann Loder	Carey Burgess	Winnipeg, Manitoba
Amber Holland	Kim Schneider	Tammy Schneider	Heather Kalenchuk	Regina, Saskatchewan
Kristy Jenion	Lisa Blixhavn	Leslie Wilson-Westcott	Raunora Westcott	Winnipeg, Manitoba
Jennifer Jones	Cathy Overton-Clapham	Jill Officer	Dana Allerton	Winnipeg, Manitoba
Andrea Kelly	Kristen MacDiarmid	Jodie DeSolla	Lianne Sobey	Perth-Andover, New Brunswick
Cathy King	Lori Olson-Johns	Raylene Rocque	Diane Dealy	Edmonton, Alberta
Shannon Kleibrink	Amy Nixon	Bronwen Saunders	Christine Keshen	Calgary, Alberta
Kerry Koe	Monique Gagnier	Kelli Turpin	Dawn Moses	Yellowknife, Northwest Territories
Stefanie Lawton	Marliese Kasner	Sherri Singler	Chelsey Matson	Saskatoon, Saskatchewan
Sheila Heath	Judy Pendergast	Deb Pendergast	Terry Loschuk (skip)	Calgary, Alberta
Kyla MacLachlan	Lindsay Blyth	Donna Phillips	Susan Wright	Calgary, Alberta
Moe Meguro	Mari Motohashi	Sakurako Terada	Mayo Yamaura	Aomori, Japan
Sherry Middaugh	Kim Moore	Kate Hamer	Andra Aldred	Coldwater, Ontario
Karen Porritt	Janice Blair	Susan Beleja	Alison Harvey	Winnipeg, Manitoba
Ludmila Privivkova	Nkeiruka Ezekh	Yana Nekrasova	Ekaterina Galkina	Moscow, Russia
Heather Rankin	Deanna Doig	Heather Jensen	Terri Clark	Calgary, Alberta
Jo-Ann Rizzo	Julie Reddick	Leigh Armstrong	Stephanie Leachman	Brantford, Ontario
Heather Nedohin	Deb Santos (skip)	Kristie Moore	Kate Horne	Edmonton, Alberta
Krista Scharf	Tara George	Tiffany Stubbings	Lorraine Lang	Thunder Bay, Ontario
Kelly Scott	Jeanna Schraeder	Sasha Carter	Renee Simons	Kelowna, British Columbia
Renee Sonnenberg	Nikki Smith	Twyla Bruce	Tina McDonald	Grande Prairie, Alberta
Barb Spencer	Chelsea Carey	Kristin Loder	Barb Mehling	Winnipeg, Manitoba
Wang Bingyu	Liu Yin	Yue Qingshuang	Zhou Yan	Harbin, China
Crystal Webster	Desiree Robertson	Samantha Preston	Stephanie Jordan	Grande Prairie, Alberta

== Results ==
=== A Event ===
Round of 16
(British Columbia) Kelly Scott	7
(New Brunswick) Andrea Kelly	2
(Alberta) Glenys Bakker	7
(Manitoba) Janet Harvey	4
(Russia) Liudmila Privivkova	8
(Alberta) Cheryl Bernard	7
(Alberta) Brittany Gregor	5
(Alberta) Kyla MacLachlan	8
(Alberta) Diane Foster	9
(Alberta) LaDawn Funk	7
(Saskatchewan) Stefanie Lawton	6
(Manitoba) Karen Porritt	5
(Ontario) Jo-Ann Rizzo	7
(Alberta) Renelle Bryden	6
(Alberta) Renee Sonnenberg	10
(Alberta) Cathy King	9

Quarterfinals
(British Columbia) Kelly Scott	W
(Alberta) Glenys Bakker
(Russia) Liudmila Privivkova	W
(Alberta) Kyla MacLachlan
(Alberta) Diane Foster
(Saskatchewan) Stefanie Lawton	W
(Ontario) Jo-Ann Rizzo	W
(Alberta) Renee Sonnenberg

Semifinals
(British Columbia) Kelly Scott	W
(Russia) Liudmila Privivkova
(Saskatchewan) Stefanie Lawton
(Ontario) Jo-Ann Rizzo	W

Qualifier 1
(British Columbia) Kelly Scott	W
(Ontario) Jo-Ann Rizzo

Round of 16
(Manitoba) Jennifer Jones	5
(Alberta) Heather Rankin	9
(Manitoba) Kristy Jenion	6
(China) Wang Bingyu	9
(Ontario) Sherry Middaugh	8
(Saskatchewan) Sherry Anderson	5
(Ontario) Krista Scharf	2
(Alberta) Crystal Webster	10
(Alberta) Deb Santos	8
(Alberta) Terry Loschuk	3
(Ontario) Jenn Hanna	2
(Northwest Territories) Kerry Koe	10
(Saskatchewan) Amber Holland	9
(Japan) Moe Meguro	5
(Manitoba) Barb Spencer	9
(Alberta) Shannon Kleibrink	6

Quarterfinals
(Alberta) Heather Rankin
(China) Wang Bingyu	W
(Ontario) Sherry Middaugh
(Alberta) Crystal Webster	W
(Alberta) Deb Santos
(Northwest Territories) Kerry Koe	W
(Saskatchewan) Amber Holland	W
(Manitoba) Barb Spencer

Semifinals
(China) Wang Bingyu
(Alberta) Crystal Webster	W
(Northwest Territories) Kerry Koe
(Saskatchewan) Amber Holland	W

Qualifier 2
(Alberta) Crystal Webster	W
(Saskatchewan) Amber Holland

=== B Event ===
Round of 32
(New Brunswick) Andrea Kelly
(Manitoba) Janet Harvey	W
(Alberta) Brittany Gregor
(Alberta) Cheryl Bernard	W
(Alberta) LaDawn Funk	W
(Manitoba) Karen Porritt
(Alberta) Renelle Bryden
(Alberta) Cathy King	W

Round of 16
(Alberta) Diane Foster
(Manitoba) Janet Harvey	W
(Alberta) Renee Sonnenberg
(Alberta) Cheryl Bernard	W
(Alberta) Glenys Bakker	W
(Alberta) LaDawn Funk
(Alberta) Kyla MacLachlan
(Alberta) Cathy King	W

Quarterfinals
(Manitoba) Janet Harvey
(China) Wang Bingyu	W
(Alberta) Cheryl Bernard	W
(Northwest Territories) Kerry Koe
(Alberta) Glenys Bakker
(Alberta) Cathy King	W

Semifinals
(China) Wang Bingyu
(Alberta) Cheryl Bernard	W
(Alberta) Cathy King	W
(Saskatchewan) Amber Holland

Qualifier 3
(Alberta) Cheryl Bernard	W
(Alberta) Cathy King

Round of 32
(Manitoba) Jennifer Jones	W
(Manitoba) Kristy Jenion
(Saskatchewan) Sherry Anderson
(Ontario) Krista Scharf	W
(Alberta) Terry Loschuk	W
(Ontario) Jenn Hanna
(Japan) Moe Meguro
(Alberta) Shannon Kleibrink	W

Round of 16
(Alberta) Deb Santos	W
(Manitoba) Jennifer Jones
(Manitoba) Barb Spencer
(Ontario) Krista Scharf	W
(Alberta) Heather Rankin	W
(Alberta) Terry Loschuk
(Ontario) Sherry Middaugh
(Alberta) Shannon Kleibrink	W

Quarterfinals
(Alberta) Deb Santos	W
(Russia) Liudmila Privivkova
(Ontario) Krista Scharf	W
(Saskatchewan) Stefanie Lawton
(Alberta) Heather Rankin
(Alberta) Shannon Kleibrink	W

Semifinals
(Alberta) Deb Santos	W
(Ontario) Krista Scharf
(Alberta) Shannon Kleibrink	W
(British Columbia) Kelly Scott

Qualifier 4
(Alberta) Deb Santos
(Alberta) Shannon Kleibrink	W

=== C Event ===
Round of 16
(New Brunswick) Andrea Kelly	W
(Alberta) Brittany Gregor
(Manitoba) Jennifer Jones	W
(Manitoba) Barb Spencer

Quarterfinals
(Russia) Liudmila Privivkova	W
(New Brunswick) Andrea Kelly
(Alberta) Heather Rankin	W
(Manitoba) Jennifer Jones

Semifinals
(Russia) Liudmila Privivkova
(Alberta) Heather Rankin	W

Qualifier 5
(Alberta) Heather Rankin	W
(Alberta) Cathy King

Round of 16
(Manitoba) Karen Porritt	W
(Alberta) Renelle Bryden

Quarterfinals
(Alberta) Terry Loschuk
(Ontario) Sherry Middaugh	W
(Saskatchewan) Stefanie Lawton	W
(Manitoba) Karen Porritt

Semifinals
(Ontario) Sherry Middaugh	W
(Saskatchewan) Amber Holland
(Saskatchewan) Stefanie Lawton	W
(China) Wang Bingyu

Qualifier 6
(Ontario) Sherry Middaugh	W
(Saskatchewan) Stefanie Lawton

Round of 16
(Manitoba) Kristy Jenion	W
(Saskatchewan) Sherry Anderson

Quarterfinals
(Northwest Territories) Kerry Koe	W
(Manitoba) Kristy Jenion
(Alberta) LaDawn Funk
(Alberta) Kyla MacLachlan	W

Semifinals
(Northwest Territories) Kerry Koe
(British Columbia) Kelly Scott	W
(Alberta) Kyla MacLachlan
(Ontario) Krista Scharf	W

Qualifier 7
(British Columbia) Kelly Scott	W
(Ontario) Krista Scharf

Round of 16
(Alberta) Diane Foster
(Alberta) Renee Sonnenberg	W
(Ontario) Jenn Hanna	W
(Japan) Moe Meguro

Quarterfinals
(Alberta) Glenys Bakker
(Alberta) Renee Sonnenberg	W
(Manitoba) Janet Harvey
(Ontario) Jenn Hanna	W

Semifinals
(Alberta) Renee Sonnenberg
(Ontario) Jenn Hanna	W

Qualifier 8
(Ontario) Jenn Hanna
(Alberta) Deb Santos	W

== Playoffs ==
Quarterfinals
(Ontario) Jo-Ann Rizzo	5
(British Columbia) Kelly Scott	6
(Alberta) Cheryl Bernard	7
(Ontario) Sherry Middaugh	5
(Alberta) Crystal Webster	12
(Alberta) Heather Rankin	3
(Alberta) Shannon Kleibrink	8
(Alberta) Deb Santos	7

Semifinals
(British Columbia) Kelly Scott	9
(Alberta) Cheryl Bernard	3
(Alberta) Crystal Webster	9
(Alberta) Shannon Kleibrink	3

Finals
(British Columbia) Kelly Scott	8
(Alberta) Crystal Webster	5
