= 2008 Trail Appliances Curling Classic =

The 2008 Trail Appliances Autumn Gold Curling Classic was held October 10-13 at the Calgary Curling Club in Calgary, Alberta. It was the first Grand Slam event of the 2008-09 Women's World Curling Tour.

== Teams ==
Skip	Third	Second	Lead	Rank	Home city
Sherry Anderson	Kim Hodson	Heather Walsh	Donna Gignac	NR	(Saskatchewan) Saskatoon
Ève Bélisle	Brenda Nicholls	Martine Comeau	Julie Rainville	12	(Quebec) Montreal
Cheryl Bernard	Susan O'Connor	Carolyn Darbyshire	Cori Bartel	14	(Alberta) Calgary
Allison Earl	Shannon Nimmo	June Campbell	Sheri Pickering	35	(Alberta) Calgary
Michelle Englot	Deanna Doig	Roberta Materi	Cindy Simmons	NR	(Saskatchewan) Regina
Diane Foster	Glenys Bakker	Jennifer Coutts	Lisa Otto	NR	(Alberta) Calgary
Cathy Auld (fourth)	Cheryl McPherson	Jennifer Issler	Alison Goring (skip)	NR	(Ontario) Thornhill
Brittany Gregor	Lindsay Blyth	Lindsay Reid	Katrine Fisette	NR	(Alberta) Calgary
Amber Holland	Kim Schneider	Tammy Schneider	Heather Seeley	NR	(Saskatchewan) Kronau
Kristy Jenion	Karen Klein	Theresa Cannon	Jillian Sandison	NR	(Manitoba) Winnipeg
Jennifer Jones	Cathy Overton-Clapham	Jill Officer	Dawn Askin	NR	(Manitoba) Winnipeg
Cathy King	Lori Olson	Raylene Rocque	Tracy Bush	19	(Alberta) Edmonton
Megan Kirk	Jodi Marthaller	Nicole Jacques	Lace Dupont	35	(Alberta) Lethbridge
Shannon Kleibrink	Amy Nixon	Bronwen Webster	Chelsey Bell	1	(Alberta) Calgary
Stefanie Lawton	Marliese Kasner	Sherri Singler	Lana Vey	NR	(Saskatchewan) Saskatoon
Christina Cadorin (fourth)	Colleen Madonia (skip)	Janet Murphy	Kate Hamer	NR	(Ontario) Mississauga
Moe Meguro	Mari Motohashi	Mayo Yamaura	Kotomi Ishizaki	NR	(Japan) Aomori
Sherry Middaugh	Kirsten Wall	Kim Moore	Andra Harmark	15	(Ontario) Coldwater
Heather Nedohin (fourth)	Kristie Moore (skip)	Beth Iskiw	Pam Appelman	48	(Alberta) Edmonton
Jill Mouzar	Heather Smith-Dacey	Kristen MacDiarmid	Teri Lake	NR	(Nova Scotia) Halifax
Karen Porritt	Janice Blair	Susan Baleja	Alison Harvey	NR	(Manitoba) Winnipeg
Ludmila Privivkova	Olga Jarkova	Nkeiruka Ezekh	Ekaterina Galkina	NR	(Russia) Moscow
Heather Rankin	Lisa Eyamie	Heather Moulding	Kyla MacLachlan	8	(Alberta) Calgary
Julie Reddick	Jo-Ann Rizzo	Leigh Armstrong	Stephanie Leachman	18	(Ontario) Brantford
Kelly Scott	Jeanna Schraeder	Sasha Carter	Renee Simons	5	(British Columbia) Kelowna
Renée Sonnenberg	Nikki Smith	Twyla Bruce	Cary-Anne Sallows	24	(Alberta) Grande Prairie
Barb Spencer	Darcy Robertson	Brette Richards	Barb Enright	NR	(Manitoba) Winnipeg
Kaileigh Straith	Kristen Williamson	Leslie Wilson	Raunora Westcott	NR	(Manitoba) Winnipeg
Liu Yin (fourth)	Wang Bingyu (skip)	Yue Qingshuang	Zhou Yan	2	(China) Harbin
Crystal Webster	Desirée Owen	Samantha Preston	Stephanie Malekoff	23	(Alberta) Grande Prairie
Georgina Wheatcroft	Stephanie Jackson	Niki Hatter	Kristen Windsor	NR	(British Columbia) New Westminster
Faye White	Karalee Swab	Michelle Ries	Cindy Westgard	35	(Alberta) Edmonton

=== Playoffs ===
Quarterfinals
(Alberta) Cheryl Bernard	5
(Manitoba) Barb Spencer	4
(Saskatchewan) Stefanie Lawton	7
(Saskatchewan) Sherry Anderson	0
(Ontario) Sherry Middaugh	9
(Alberta) Kristie Moore	4
(Alberta) Heather Rankin	4
(Alberta) Shannon Kleibrink	8

Semifinals
(Alberta) Cheryl Bernard	8
(Saskatchewan) Stefanie Lawton	1
(Ontario) Sherry Middaugh	2
(Alberta) Shannon Kleibrink	8

Finals
(Alberta) Cheryl Bernard	2
(Alberta) Shannon Kleibrink	8
