= 2009 Alberta Scotties Tournament of Hearts =

- Host city: Sylvan Lake, Alberta
- Arena: Medican Multiplex
- Dates: January 28-February 1, 2009
- Winner: Team Bernard
- Curling club: Calgary Curling Club & Calgary Winter Club
- Skip: Cheryl Bernard
- Third: Susan O'Connor
- Second: Carolyn Darbyshire
- Lead: Cori Bartel
- Finalist: Heather Nedohin

The 2009 Alberta Scotties Tournament of Hearts, Alberta's women's provincial curling championship, was held January 28 - February 1 at the Medican Multiplex in Sylvan Lake. The winning Cheryl Bernard team represented team Alberta at the 2009 Scotties Tournament of Hearts in Victoria, British Columbia.

== Teams ==
Skip	Third	Second	Lead	Club(s)
Cheryl Bernard	Susan O'Connor	Carolyn Darbyshire	Cori Bartel	Calgary Curling Club and Calgary Winter Club, Calgary
Brandee Borne	Nicky Kaufman	Tana Martin	Kate Horne	Saville Sports Centre, Edmonton
Delia DeJong	Norma Huitt	Stephanie Walker	Belle Thomas	Sexsmith Curling Club, Sexsmith
Megan Kirk	Jodi Mathaller	Nicole Jacques	Lace Dupont	Lethbridge Curling Club, Lethbridge
Shannon Kleibrink	Amy Nixon	Bronwen Webster	Chelsey Bell	Calgary Winter Club, Calgary
Tiffany McKeeman	Nola Zingel	Heather Kuntz	Michelle Corbell	Lloydminster Curling Club, Lloydminster
Heather Nedohin	Beth Iskiw	Kristie Moore	Pamela Appelman	Saville Sports Centre, Edmonton
Tiffany Odegard	Jennifer Pinkster	Lisa Miller	Melissa Pierce	Crestwood Curling Club, Edmonton
Heather Rankin	Lisa Eyamie	Heather Moulding	Kyla MacLachlan	Calgary Winter Club, Calgary
Leslie Rogers	Allison Nimik	Teryn Hamilton	Lauren Turnquist	Cochrane Curling Club, Cochrane
Renee Sonnenberg	Nikki Smith	Twyla Bruce	Cary-Anne Swallows	Grande Prairie Curling Club, Grande Prairie
Crystal Webster	Desiree Owen	Samantha Preston	Stephanie Malekoff	Calgary Winter Club, Calgary

== Draw Brackets ==
=== A Event ===
Round of 16
Megan Kirk	6
Leslie Rogers	7
Heather Rankin	10
Delia DeJong	6
Heather Nedohin	6
Tiffany McKeeman	4
Tiffany Odegard	5
Brandee Borne	6

Quarterfinals
Shannon Kleibrink	7
Leslie Rogers	6
Crystal Webster	7
Heather Rankin	4
Renee Sonnenberg	11
Heather Nedohin	5
Cheryl Bernard	11
Brandee Borne	7

Semifinals
Shannon Kleibrink	9
Crystal Webster	8
Renee Sonnenberg	5
Cheryl Bernard	8

A Qualifier
Shannon Kleibrink	6
Cheryl Bernard	8

=== B Event ===
Round of 16
Megan Kirk	8
Heather Rankin	6
Heather Nedohin	8
Delia DeJong	1
Tiffany McKeeman	5
Brandee Borne	8
Tiffany Odegard	6
Leslie Rogers	9

Quarterfinals
Renee Sonnenberg	8
Megan Kirk	12
Crystal Webster	6
Heather Nedohin	7
Brandee Borne	8
Leslie Rogers	10

Semifinals
Megan Kirk	5
Heather Nedohin	12
Shannon Kleibrink	8
Leslie Rogers	0

B Qualifier
Heather Nedohin	6
Shannon Kleibrink	8

=== C Event ===
Quarterfinals		Semifinals		C Qualifier
		Leslie Rogers	6
Heather Rankin	8	Heather Rankin	3
Delia DeJong	5			Leslie Rogers	8
				Megan Kirk	3
		Brandee Borne	6
		Megan Kirk	7

Quarterfinals		Semifinals		C Qualifier
Tiffany McKeeman	2
Renee Sonnenberg	7	Renee Sonnenberg	7
Tiffany Odegard	5	Crystal Webster	8
Crystal Webster	9			Crystal Webster	6
				Heather Nedohin	7

== Results ==
=== Draw 1 ===
January 28, 1300

Sheet A	1	2	3	4	5	6	7	8	9	10	Final
Heather Nedohin	0	2	0	1	0	0	0	2	0	1	6
Tiffany McKeeman 🔨	1	0	1	0	0	2	0	0	0	0	4

Sheet B	1	2	3	4	5	6	7	8	9	10	Final
Heather Rankin 🔨	0	2	0	1	0	2	0	1	0	4	10
Delia DeJong	1	0	1	0	2	0	1	0	1	0	6

Sheet C	1	2	3	4	5	6	7	8	9	10	Final
Megan Kirk	0	0	1	0	2	1	0	1	0	1	6
Leslie Rogers 🔨	1	3	0	1	0	0	1	0	1	0	7

Sheet D	1	2	3	4	5	6	7	8	9	10	11	Final
Tiffany Odegard	0	0	0	0	0	0	2	0	1	2	0	5
Brandee Borne 🔨	0	0	0	0	2	2	0	1	0	0	1	6

=== Draw 2 ===
January 28, 1830

Sheet A	1	2	3	4	5	6	7	8	9	10	Final
Heather Rankin	0	0	0	2	0	1	0	1	X	X	4
Crystal Webster	1	1	0	0	3	0	2	0	X	X	7

Sheet B	1	2	3	4	5	6	7	8	9	10	11	Final
Shannon Kleibrink	0	0	3	0	0	0	1	0	2	0	1	7
Leslie Rogers	0	1	0	0	3	0	0	1	0	1	0	6

Sheet C	1	2	3	4	5	6	7	8	9	10	11	Final
Brandee Borne	0	1	0	0	2	1	0	0	2	1	0	7
Cheryl Bernard	1	0	0	1	0	0	4	1	0	0	4	11

Sheet D	1	2	3	4	5	6	7	8	9	10	Final
Renee Sonnenberg	0	1	0	4	2	0	2	0	2	X	11
Heather Nedohin	2	0	1	0	0	1	0	1	0	X	5

=== Draw 3 ===
January 29, 0830

Sheet B	1	2	3	4	5	6	7	8	9	10	Final
Renee Sonnenberg 🔨	1	0	2	0	1	0	1	0	0	0	5
Cheryl Bernard	0	1	0	2	0	2	0	1	1	1	8

Sheet D	1	2	3	4	5	6	7	8	9	10	Final
Shannon Kleibrink	2	4	0	0	2	0	0	0	0	1	9
Crystal Webster 🔨	0	0	1	1	0	1	2	2	1	0	8

=== Draw 4 ===
January 28, 1330

Sheet A	1	2	3	4	5	6	7	8	9	10	Final
Tiffany Odegard 🔨	2	0	2	0	1	0	0	1	0	X	6
Leslie Rogers	0	3	0	1	0	2	1	0	2	X	9

Sheet B	1	2	3	4	5	6	7	8	9	10	Final
Tiffany McKeeman 🔨	1	0	1	0	2	0	0	0	1	X	5
Brandee Borne	0	1	0	2	0	0	3	2	0	X	8

Sheet C	1	2	3	4	5	6	7	8	9	10	Final
Heather Nedohin 🔨	2	1	0	2	2	1	X	X	X	X	8
Delia DeJong	0	0	1	0	0	0	X	X	X	X	1

Sheet D	1	2	3	4	5	6	7	8	9	10	Final
Megan Kirk 🔨	1	0	0	0	2	2	0	3	0	X	8
Heather Rankin	0	2	1	0	0	0	2	0	1	X	6

=== Draw 5 ===
January 29, 1830

Sheet A	1	2	3	4	5	6	7	8	9	10	Final
Megan Kirk 🔨	4	0	0	2	0	3	0	2	1	X	12
Renee Sonnenberg	0	4	1	0	1	0	2	0	0	X	8

Sheet B	1	2	3	4	5	6	7	8	9	10	11	Final
Heather Nedohin	0	0	2	1	0	2	0	0	0	1	1	7
Crystal Webster 🔨	0	2	0	0	1	0	2	1	0	0	0	6

Sheet C	1	2	3	4	5	6	7	8	9	10	Final
Shannon Kleibrink	0	2	0	2	0	1	0	0	1	0	6
Cheryl Bernard 🔨	1	0	2	0	1	0	1	1	0	2	8

Sheet D	1	2	3	4	5	6	7	8	9	10	Final
Brandee Borne 🔨	1	1	0	0	1	0	0	3	2	0	8
Leslie Rogers	0	0	0	4	0	2	2	0	0	2	10

=== Draw 6 ===
January 30, 0830

Sheet A	1	2	3	4	5	6	7	8	9	10	Final
Heather Rankin 🔨	1	0	2	0	0	4	0	0	1	X	8
Delia DeJong	0	2	0	1	1	0	0	1	0	X	5

Sheet C	1	2	3	4	5	6	7	8	9	10	Final
Tiffany Odegard 🔨	1	0	2	0	0	0	0	2	0	X	5
Crystal Webster	0	2	0	2	1	1	1	0	2	X	9

Sheet D	1	2	3	4	5	6	7	8	9	10	Final
Tiffany McKeeman	0	0	1	0	0	1	0	0	X	X	2
Renee Sonnenberg 🔨	2	1	0	1	1	0	1	1	X	X	7

=== Draw 7 ===
January 30, 1330

Sheet B	1	2	3	4	5	6	7	8	9	10	Final
Leslie Rogers	0	0	0	0	0	0	X	X	X	X	0
Shannon Kleibrink 🔨	2	1	0	2	2	1	X	X	X	X	8

Sheet D	1	2	3	4	5	6	7	8	9	10	Final
Megan Kirk 🔨	3	0	0	0	1	1	0	X	X	X	5
Heather Nedohin	0	1	3	3	0	0	5	X	X	X	12

=== Draw 8 ===
January 30, 1830

Sheet A	1	2	3	4	5	6	7	8	9	10	Final
Brandee Borne 🔨	1	0	0	1	0	2	0	1	0	1	6
Megan Kirk	0	1	0	0	2	0	2	0	2	0	7

Sheet B	1	2	3	4	5	6	7	8	9	10	11	Final
Renee Sonnenberg 🔨	0	1	0	3	0	0	0	2	0	1	0	7
Crystal Webster	0	0	2	0	3	0	1	0	1	0	1	8

Sheet C	1	2	3	4	5	6	7	8	9	10	11	Final
Heather Nedohin	0	0	0	1	0	2	0	2	1	0	0	6
Shannon Kleibrink 🔨	2	0	0	0	1	0	1	0	0	2	2	8

Sheet D	1	2	3	4	5	6	7	8	9	10	Final
Leslie Rogers 🔨	0	0	0	0	1	2	0	1	2	X	6
Heather Rankin	1	0	0	0	0	0	2	0	0	X	3

=== Draw 9 ===
January 31, 1300

Sheet C	1	2	3	4	5	6	7	8	9	10	Final
Leslie Rogers 🔨	1	2	0	2	1	0	0	2	X	X	8
Megan Kirk	0	0	1	0	0	1	1	0	X	X	3

Sheet D	1	2	3	4	5	6	7	8	9	10	11	Final
Crystal Webster 🔨	2	0	2	0	0	1	0	1	0	0	0	6
Heather Nedohin	0	1	0	1	0	0	2	0	1	1	1	7

== Playoffs ==
Page playoff system
A	Cheryl Bernard	8
B	Shannon Kleibrink	5
C1	Leslie Rogers	1
C2	Heather Nedohin	7

Semifinal
B	Shannon Kleibrink	7
C2	Heather Nedohin	8

Final
A	Cheryl Bernard	9
C2	Heather Nedohin	7

=== C1 vs. C2 ===
January 31, 1830

Sheet A	1	2	3	4	5	6	7	8	9	10	Final
Leslie Rogers	0	0	0	0	1	0	0	0	X	X	1
Heather Nedohin 🔨	1	0	0	1	0	2	1	2	X	X	7

=== A vs. B ===
January 31, 1830

Sheet C	1	2	3	4	5	6	7	8	9	10	Final
Cheryl Bernard 🔨	0	2	0	2	0	3	0	0	1	X	8
Shannon Kleibrink	0	0	1	0	1	0	2	1	0	X	5

=== Semi-final ===
February 1, 0930

Sheet B	1	2	3	4	5	6	7	8	9	10	Final
Shannon Kleibrink 🔨	0	1	0	2	0	1	2	0	1	0	7
Heather Nedohin	0	0	4	0	1	0	0	2	0	1	8

=== Final ===
February 1, 1400

Sheet C	1	2	3	4	5	6	7	8	9	10	11	Final
Cheryl Bernard 🔨	0	0	2	1	0	0	2	2	0	0	2	9
Heather Nedohin	0	2	0	0	1	0	0	0	3	1	0	7
