= 2010 Alberta Scotties Tournament of Hearts =

- Host city: Calgary, Alberta
- Arena: Calgary Curling Club
- Dates: January 6–10, 2010
- Winner: Team Sweeting
- Curling club: Saville Sports Centre, Edmonton
- Skip: Val Sweeting
- Third: Megan Einarson
- Second: Whitney More
- Lead: Lindsay Makichuk
- Finalist: Shannon Kleibrink

The 2010 Alberta Scotties Tournament of Hearts was the 2010 edition of the Alberta provincial women's curling championship. It was held January 6–10 at the Calgary Curling Club in Calgary, Alberta. The winning team represented Alberta at the 2010 Scotties Tournament of Hearts in Sault Ste. Marie, Ontario.

== Teams ==
Skip	Vice	Second	Lead	Club
Jodi Busche	Sandy Treit	Teri Crocker	Aisha Veiner	Dawson Creek Curling Club, Dawson Creek (British Columbia)
Delia DeJong	Jenilee Goertzen	Stephanie Walker	Robyn Falkner	Granite Curling Club, Edmonton
Brenda Doroshuk	Dana Ferguson	Michelle Mouzar	Jolene Tyne	Saville Sports Centre, Edmonton
Cathy King	Kaitlyn Lawes	Raylene Rocque	Tracey Bush	Saville Sports Centre, Edmonton
Megan Kirk	Jodi Mathaller	Nicole Bawel	Lace Dupont	Lethbridge Curling Club, Lethbridge
Shannon Kleibrink	Amy Nixon	Bronwen Webster	Chelsey Bell	Calgary Winter Club, Calgary
Heather Nedohin	Beth Iskiw	Jessica Mair	Pamela Appelman	Saville Sports Centre, Edmonton
Tiffany Odegard	Jennifer Pinkster	Lisa Miller	Melissa Pierce	Crestwood Curling Club, Edmonton
Leslie Rogers	Allison Nimik	Teryn Hamilton	Lauren Turnquist	Cochrane Curling Club, Cochrane
Renee Sonnenberg	Desiree Owen	Cary-Anne Swallows	Michelle Taraback	Grande Prairie Curling Club, Grande Prairie
Val Sweeting	Megan Einarson	Whitney More	Lindsay Makichuk	Saville Sports Centre, Edmonton
Crystal Webster	Lori Olson-Johns	Samantha Preston	Stephanie Malekoff	Calgary Winter Club, Calgary

== Draw Brackets ==
=== A Event ===
Round of 16
Rogers	12
Sweeting	3
Sonnenberg	7
Dorushuk	4
Odegard	3
Busche	11
Kirk	10
DeJong	5

Quarterfinals
Kleibrink	6
Rogers	5
King	4
Sonnenberg	2
Nedohin	6
Busche	3
Webster	11
Kirk	3

Semifinals
Kleibrink	10
King	8
Nedohin	8
Webster	3

A Qualifier
Kleibrink	8
Nedohin	5

=== B Event ===
Round of 16
Sonnenberg	6
Sweeting	8
Busche	5
Doroshuk	4
Kirk	1
Odegard	8
Rogers	8
DeJong	7

Quarterfinals
Webster	5
Sweeting	7
King	10
Busche	4
Odegard	7
Rogers	8

Semifinals
Sweeting	2
King	11
Rogers	7
Nedohin	5

B Qualifier
King	6
Rogers	5

=== C Event ===
Quarterfinals		Semifinals		C Qualifier
		Sonnenberg	6
Sonnenberg	8	Nedohin	4
Doruschuk	3			Sonnenberg	3
				Sweeting	6
		Odegard	1
		Sweeting	9

Quarterfinals		Semifinals		C Qualifier
Webster	7
Kirk	6	Webster	9
DeJong	10	DeJong	3
Busche	6			Webster	5
				Rogers	6

== Playoffs ==
Page playoff system
A	Shannon Kleibrink	5
B	Cathy King	4
C1	Val Sweeting	9
C2	Leslie Rogers	7

Semifinal
B	Cathy King	3
C2	Val Sweeting	8

Final
A	Shannon Kleibrink	7
C2	Val Sweeting	9

=== A vs. B ===
January 9, 8:30pm

Team	1	2	3	4	5	6	7	8	9	10	Final
Shannon Kleibrink	1	0	0	1	1	0	2	0	0	X	5
Cathy King	0	0	1	0	0	1	0	1	1	X	4

=== C1 vs. C2 ===
January 9, 8:30pm

Sheet A	1	2	3	4	5	6	7	8	9	10	Final
Leslie Rogers	1	0	2	0	1	0	1	1	1	X	7
Val Sweeting	0	2	0	3	0	4	0	0	0	X	9

=== Semi-final ===
January 10, 9:30am

Team	1	2	3	4	5	6	7	8	9	10	Final
Cathy King	0	0	0	1	0	0	0	2	0	X	3
Val Sweeting	0	0	0	0	2	3	1	0	2	X	8

=== Final ===
January 10, 2:00pm

Team	1	2	3	4	5	6	7	8	9	10	11	Final
Shannon Kleibrink	0	0	1	0	2	0	2	0	0	2	0	7
Val Sweeting	0	1	0	2	0	2	0	2	0	0	2	9
