= Autumn Gold Curling Classic =

- Established: 1978
- Host city: Okotoks, Alberta
- Arena: Okotoks Curling Club
- Purse: CAD $45,000
- 2026 champion: (Alberta) Selena Sturmay

Current edition
- 2026 Autumn Gold Curling Classic

Location in Canada

The Autumn Gold Curling Classic is an annual women's curling tour event held, normally held at the Calgary Curling Club in Calgary, Alberta.

The first Autumn Gold Classic was held in 1978, and at the time only had a total purse of $10,500, with the winning team receiving $4,000. At the time, it had the largest purse for a women's curling tournament in Canada. Its main sponsor in 1978 was JoAnne's Fashions.

The event began seeing international teams in 1987, thanks in part to the sport being added as a demonstration event at the 1988 Winter Olympics.

The 1996 and 2000 events were qualifiers for the 1997 and 2001 Canadian Olympic Curling Trials respectively.

The 2001 event was the first televised tournament on the Women's World Curling Tour, with the semifinals and finals shown on WTSN.

It was the first World Curling Tour Grand Slam event of the season from 2006 to 2014, but is no longer considered a Slam. It was never operated by the Grand Slam of Curling, but teams did accumulate points toward the Capital One Cup/Rogers Grand Slam Cup.

Between 2004 and 2018, the total prize money given out has been in excess of $50,000. In 2019, the purse was $44,000, with the winning team receiving $12,000.

The 2010 Classic saw the first non-Canadian team to win a Grand Slam event, the Wang Bingyu rink from China.

In 2024, Korea's Team Gim Eun-ji became the first rink to win three consecutive titles at the event, also winning in 2022 and 2023. They extended their record to four consecutive titles by winning again in 2025.

The 2025 event was held at the Okotoks Curling Club in Okotoks, Alberta for the first time.

== Sponsors ==
- JoAnne's Fashions (1978–1980)
- Labatt (1985–1990)
- Husky Oil (1991–2002)
- Trail Appliances (2003–2009)
- Curlers Corner (2010–2024)

== Past champions ==
Past champions are as follows:

Year	Winning team	Runner up team	Purse (CAD)
1978	(Saskatchewan) Dorenda Schoenhals, Pat Hamilton, Janet Crimp, Susan Hicks	(Saskatchewan) Marj Mitchell, Kendra Richards, Nancy Kerr, Wendy Leach	$10,500
1979	(Saskatchewan) Crystal Brunas, Anita Ford, Randi Kelly, Nelda McDonald	(Alberta) Susan Seitz, Judy Erickson, Myrna McKay, Pat Greenfield	$12,000
1980	(British Columbia) Kerrylyn Richard, Marion Radcliffe, Marlene Wilcox, Jan Fawdry	(Alberta) Joan Hart, Elly Nally, Sheila Cahoon, Sandy Turner	$14,000
1981	(Saskatchewan) Kathy Fahlman, Brenda Campbell, Jan Betker, Sheila Ell	(Alberta) Linda Saunders, Shelley Vejprava, Connie Barrett, Kim Sloan	$15,000
1982	(Alberta) Ruby Sowinski, Deb Lewis, Penny Ryan, Bonnie Bower	(Saskatchewan) Kathy Fahlman	$15,000
1983	(Saskatchewan) Emily Farnham, Joyce McKee, Doreen Thomas, Linda Nugent	(Alberta) Judy Lukowich	$15,000
1984	(Alberta) Sandy Turner, Peggy Harper, Darlene Tucker, Debby Mazuren	(Saskatchewan) Marilyn Cheyne, Brenda Sisson, Lorie Kehler, Trixie Rhystephanick	$15,000
1985	(Ontario) Marilyn Bodogh-Darte, Kathy Young, Christine Jurgenson, Jan Augustyn	(Alberta) Sandy Turner	$20,000
1986	(Ontario) Marilyn Bodogh-Darte, Lorraine Lang, Christine Jurgenson, Jan Augustyn	(Saskatchewan) Kathy Fahlman	$20,000
1987	(British Columbia) Jan Wiltzen, Sue Garvey, Gailya Wasylk, Val Lahucik	(Alberta) Sandra Risebrough, Levonne Louie, Heather Loat, Brenda Rogers	$20,000
1988	(Saskatchewan) Michelle Schneider, Joan Stricker, Lorie Kehler, Leanne Eberle	(Alberta) Carol Davis	$20,000
1989	(British Columbia) Kerrylyn Richard, Penny Ryan, Sandra Jenkins, Iris Nielson	(Alberta) Sandy Turner	$22,000
1990	(Alberta) Cheryl Bernard, Allison Rizos, Bev Kellerman, Sue Fulkerth	(Alberta) Linda Wild	$22,000
1991	(Saskatchewan) Sandra Peterson, Jan Betker, Joan McCusker, Marcia Schiml	(Alberta) Diane Foster	$22,000
1992	(Saskatchewan) Michelle Schneider, Kathy Fahlman, Patti Grant, Lorie Kehler	(Alberta) Deb Shermack-Santos	$25,000
1993	(Saskatchewan) Sherry Scheirich, Colleen Zielke, Sandra Mulroney, Lynn Bell	(Alberta) Glenys Bakker	$26,000
1994	(Saskatchewan) Michelle Schneider, Atina Ford, Sandi McNabb, Cindy Ford	(Sweden) Elisabet Johansson	$26,000
1995	(Sweden) Elisabet Gustafson, Katarina Nyberg, Louise Marmont, Elisabeth Persson	(Alberta) Glenys Bakker	$28,800
1996	(Alberta) Shannon Kleibrink, Glenys Bakker, Shannon Nimmo, Joanne Wright	(British Columbia) Kelley Owen	$41,000
1997	(Alberta) Heather Rankin, Carolyn Darbyshire, Sally Shigehiro, Margo Wright	(Alberta) Cheryl Kullman	$33,000
1998	(Ontario) Kim Gellard, Sherry Scheirich, Lisa Savage, Allison Ross	(Saskatchewan) Amber Holland	$38,000
1999	(Alberta) Cathy Borst, Glenys Bakker, Brenda Bohmer, Kate Horne	(Alberta) Bronwen Saunders, Evelyn Lamontagne, Tara Runquist, Brenda Turcotte	$33,000
2000	(Saskatchewan) Amber Holland, Kay Montgomery, Karen Purdy, Pat Bell	(Saskatchewan) Shannon Kleibrink, Jan Betker, Joan McCusker, Marcia Gudereit	$47,500
2001	(Alberta) Cathy King, Lawnie MacDonald, Brenda Bohmer, Kate Horne	(Alberta) Cheryl Bernard, Susan O'Connor, Barb Davies, Karen Ruus	$33,000
2002	(Alberta) Heather Nedohin, Atina Johnston, Lawnie MacDonald, Rona Pasika	(Alberta) Cheryl Bernard, Susan O'Connor, Barb Davies, Karen Ruus	$48,000
2003	(Saskatchewan) Sherry Anderson, Kim Hodson, Sandra Mulroney, Donna Gignac	(Alberta) Cathy King, Lori Olson, Jackie Brett, Raylynn McCaffery	$46,000
2004	(Saskatchewan) Stefanie Lawton, Marliese Kasner, Sherri Singler, Chelsey Bell	(Alberta) Cheryl Bernard, Susan O'Connor, Jody McNabb, Karen Ruus	$55,000
2005	(Ontario) Jenn Hanna, Joëlle Sabourin, Dawn Askin, Stephanie Hanna	(Saskatchewan) Jan Betker, Sherry Linton, Joan McCusker, Marcia Gudereit	$55,000
2006	(British Columbia) Kelly Scott, Jeanna Schraeder, Sasha Carter, Renee Simons	(Alberta) Crystal Webster, Desirée Robertson, Samantha Preston, Stephanie Jordan	$51,000
2007	(Manitoba) Jennifer Jones, Cathy Overton-Clapham, Jill Officer, Dawn Askin	(Alberta) Shannon Kleibrink, Amy Nixon, Bronwen Saunders, Chelsey Bell	$56,000
2008	(Alberta) Shannon Kleibrink, Amy Nixon, Bronwen Webster, Chelsey Bell	(Alberta) Cheryl Bernard, Susan O'Connor, Carolyn Darbyshire, Cori Bartel	$56,000
2009	(Manitoba) Jennifer Jones, Cathy Overton-Clapham, Jill Officer, Dawn Askin	(China) Wang Bingyu, Liu Yin, Yue Qingshuang, Zhou Yan	$56,000
2010	(China) Wang Bingyu, Liu Yin, Yue Qingshuang, Sun Yue	(Alberta) Desirée Owen, Kalynn Park, Cary-Anne Sallows, Stephanie Malekoff	$52,000
2011	(Manitoba) Cathy Overton-Clapham, Jenna Loder, Ashley Howard, Breanne Meakin	(Alberta) Amy Nixon, Bronwen Webster, Carolyn Darbyshire, Chelsey Matson	$60,000
2012	(Ontario) Sherry Middaugh, Jo-Ann Rizzo, Lee Merklinger, Leigh Armstrong	(Ontario) Rachel Homan, Emma Miskew, Alison Kreviazuk, Lisa Weagle	$54,000
2013	(Scotland) Eve Muirhead, Anna Sloan, Vicki Adams, Claire Hamilton	(China) Wang Bingyu, Liu Yin, Yue Qingshuang, Zhou Yan	$50,000
2014	(Manitoba) Jennifer Jones, Kaitlyn Lawes, Jill Officer, Dawn McEwen	(Ontario) Rachel Homan, Emma Miskew, Joanne Courtney, Lisa Weagle	$50,000
2015	(Ontario) Rachel Homan, Emma Miskew, Joanne Courtney, Lisa Weagle	(Alberta) Chelsea Carey, Amy Nixon, Jocelyn Peterman, Laine Peters	$50,000
2016	(Alberta) Casey Scheidegger, Cary-Anne McTaggart, Jessie Scheidegger, Stephanie Enright	(Manitoba) Jennifer Jones, Kaitlyn Lawes, Jill Officer, Dawn McEwen	$50,000
2017	(Ontario) Rachel Homan, Emma Miskew, Joanne Courtney, Lisa Weagle	(United States) Nina Roth, Tabitha Peterson, Aileen Geving, Becca Hamilton	$50,000
2018	(Manitoba) Kerri Einarson, Val Sweeting, Shannon Birchard, Briane Meilleur	(Manitoba) Jennifer Jones, Kaitlyn Lawes, Jocelyn Peterman, Dawn McEwen	$50,000
2019	(Manitoba) Kerri Einarson, Val Sweeting, Shannon Birchard, Briane Meilleur	(Alberta) Cheryl Bernard, Cary-Anne McTaggart, Jessie Haughian, Kristie Moore	$44,000
2020	Cancelled due to the COVID-19 pandemic in Alberta		
2021	(United States) Tabitha Peterson, Nina Roth, Becca Hamilton, Tara Peterson	(Japan) Satsuki Fujisawa, Chinami Yoshida, Yumi Suzuki, Yurika Yoshida	$44,000
2022	(South Korea) Gim Eun-ji, Kim Min-ji, Kim Su-ji, Seol Ye-eun, Seol Ye-ji	(Switzerland) Michèle Jäggi, Irene Schori, Stefanie Berset, Sarah Müller, Lara Stocker	$44,000
2023	(South Korea) Gim Eun-ji, Kim Min-ji, Kim Su-ji, Seol Ye-eun, Seol Ye-ji	(Japan) Misaki Tanaka (Fourth), Miori Nakamura (Skip), Haruka Kihara, Hiyori Ichinohe	$45,000
2024	(South Korea) Gim Eun-ji, Kim Min-ji, Kim Su-ji, Seol Ye-eun, Seol Ye-ji	(China) Wang Rui, Han Yu, Dong Ziqi, Jiang Jiayi, Su Tingyu	$45,000
2025	(South Korea) Gim Eun-ji, Kim Min-ji, Kim Su-ji, Seol Ye-ji, Seol Ye-eun	(British Columbia) Taylor Reese-Hansen, Megan McGillivray, Kim Bonneau, Julianna Mackenzie	$45,000
2026	(Alberta) Selena Sturmay, Danielle Schmiemann, Dezaray Hawes, Paige Papley	(South Korea) Kim Min-ji (Fourth), Gim Eun-ji (Skip), Kim Su-ji, Seol Ye-eun, Seol Ye-ji	$45,000
