= Amy Nixon =

Canadian curler (born 1977)

- Curler
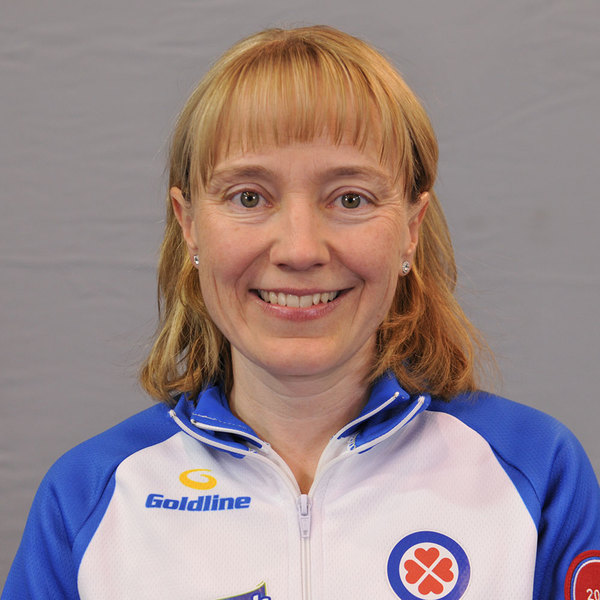
- Born: September 29, 1977 (age 49); Saskatoon, Saskatchewan, Canada

Team
- Curling club: Calgary CC, Calgary, AB

Curling career
- Hearts: 6 (2004, 2008, 2011, 2012, 2016, 2017)
- World Championship: 2 (2012, 2016)
- Grand Slam victories: 2 (Autumn Gold, 2008; Casinos of Winnipeg, 2007)
Medal record
Curling
Winter Olympics
Bronze medal – third place	2006 Turin
World Championships
Bronze medal – third place	2012 Lethbridge
Scotties Tournament of Hearts
Gold medal – first place	2012 Red Deer
Gold medal – first place	2016 Grande Prairie
Silver medal – second place	2008 Regina
Bronze medal – third place	2017 St. Catharines
Canadian Olympic Curling Trials
Gold medal – first place	2005 Halifax
Silver medal – second place	2009 Edmonton

Amy Lee Nixon (born September 29, 1977) is a Canadian retired curler and lawyer from Calgary, Alberta. She was a member of the bronze medal-winning 2006 Winter Olympic women's curling team, skipped by Shannon Kleibrink. Nixon was also the chair of the board of governors of Curling Canada from 2021 to 2022.

== Curling career ==
Nixon began curling competitively at fourteen. Her first notable success was being a gold medal-winning skip at the Saskatchewan Winter Games in 1994, which she followed up with a 10th-place finish at the 1995 Canada Games. She would later move to Alberta, where she was the runner-up at the 1998 provincial junior championship, losing the Alberta final to Bronwen Saunders.

Nixon was a member of the Shannon Kleibrink mixed curling team that represented Alberta at the 2003 Canadian Mixed Curling Championship. It was the first time ever that a woman (Kleibrink) skipped a team at the Canadian Mixed. The team had Nixon (who threw second stones), hold the broom for Kleibrink's shots, allowing both male team members to sweep Kleibrink's stones, a unique advantage for the team. At the 2003 Mixed, the team made it to the final, where they lost to Nova Scotia's Paul Flemming rink.

Nixon joined Kleibrink's women's team in 2003. The team found success in their first season together, winning the Alberta Hearts, and representing Alberta at the 2004 Scott Tournament of Hearts, where they went 6–5.

As a third for Kleibrink, Nixon shared in several successes in the women's game, including winning the Canada Cup in 2005 and 2009, and the 2005 Canadian Olympic Curling Trials. The team represented Canada at the 2006 Winter Olympics in Turin, where they won the bronze medal. In addition to the 2004 Hearts, the team also represented Alberta at the 2008 Scotties Tournament of Hearts, where they were runners-up and at the 2011 Scotties Tournament of Hearts, finishing with a 6–5 record.

After the Kleibrink rink lost in the B final of the 2012 Alberta Scotties Tournament of Hearts, Nixon was added as the alternate on the winning Heather Nedohin team after the event. The team represented Alberta at the 2012 Scotties Tournament of Hearts, which they won. They then went on to represent Canada at the 2012 World Women's Curling Championship, where they won the bronze medal. At the end of the 2011–2012 curling season, Nixon announced she would leave team Kleibrink, effective at the end of the 2012 Pomeroy Inn & Suites Prairie Showdown, to form her own team.

After a few seasons skipping her own team, and one season playing for Nedohin, Nixon joined the Chelsea Carey rink in 2015. The team won the 2016 Alberta Hearts and the 2016 Scotties Tournament of Hearts for Alberta. They then represented Canada at the 2016 World Women's Curling Championship, where they finished in 4th place. As defending champions, they represented Team Canada at the 2017 Scotties Tournament of Hearts. There, they ended up finishing third. After the event, Nixon announced her retirement from competitive curling.

She was inducted into the Canadian Curling Hall of Fame in 2024.

== Personal life ==
At the age of four she moved with her family to Regina, Saskatchewan, where she grew up. She moved to Calgary in 1995, where she now resides. Nixon is an alumnus of the University of Calgary with three degrees in kinesiology, women's studies and law. She was admitted to the Alberta bar in November 2006. Nixon has been employed at Mount Royal University since 2011, and has been the General Counsel and University Secretary there since 2021. She is married to Mike Westlund and has one child. Nixon's father, Daryl, was the coach of the 2006 Olympic women's curling team.

Nixon was elected as Chair of Curling Canada's Board of Governors in June 2021, replacing Mitch Minken who stepped down for personal reasons. She was re-elected a few months later to begin a full one-year term.

== Grand Slam record ==
Key
C	Champion
F	Lost in Final
SF	Lost in Semifinal
QF	Lost in Quarterfinals
R16	Lost in the round of 16
Q	Did not advance to playoffs
T2	Played in Tier 2 event
DNP	Did not participate in event
N/A	Not a Grand Slam event that season

Event	2006–07	2007–08	2008–09	2009–10	2010–11	2011–12	2012–13	2013–14	2014–15	2015–16	2016–17
Tour Challenge	N/A	N/A	N/A	N/A	N/A	N/A	N/A	N/A	N/A	Q	Q
Masters	N/A	N/A	N/A	N/A	N/A	N/A	DNP	DNP	Q	DNP	QF
The National	N/A	N/A	N/A	N/A	N/A	N/A	N/A	N/A	N/A	Q	DNP
Canadian Open	N/A	N/A	N/A	N/A	N/A	N/A	N/A	N/A	SF	SF	Q
Players'	Q	Q	F	QF	QF	DNP	DNP	DNP	QF	DNP	DNP
Champions Cup	N/A	N/A	N/A	N/A	N/A	N/A	N/A	N/A	N/A	Q	DNP

=== Former events ===
Event	2006–07	2007–08	2008–09	2009–10	2010–11	2011–12	2012–13
Wayden Transportation	SF	QF	Q	N/A	N/A	N/A	N/A
Sobeys Slam	N/A	SF	Q	N/A	DNP	N/A	N/A
Autumn Gold	SF	F	C	Q	QF	F	Q
Manitoba Lotteries	SF	C	Q	DNP	DNP	DNP	DNP
Colonial Square Ladies Classic	N/A	N/A	N/A	N/A	N/A	N/A	Q

== Teams ==
Season	Skip	Third	Second	Lead	Events
2003–04	Shannon Kleibrink	Amy Nixon	Glenys Bakker	Stephanie Marchand	2004 ASTOH, STOH
2004–05	Shannon Kleibrink	Amy Nixon	Glenys Bakker	Christine Keshen	
2005–06	Shannon Kleibrink	Amy Nixon	Glenys Bakker	Christine Keshen	2005 COCT, 2006 OG
2007–08	Shannon Kleibrink	Amy Nixon	Bronwen Saunders	Chelsey Bell	2008 ASTOH, STOH
2008–09	Shannon Kleibrink	Amy Nixon	Bronwen Webster	Chelsey Bell	2009 ASTOH
2009–10	Shannon Kleibrink	Amy Nixon	Bronwen Webster	Chelsey Matson	2010 ASTOH
2010–11	Shannon Kleibrink	Amy Nixon	Bronwen Webster	Chelsey Matson	2011 ASTOH, STOH
2011–12 (Note: Nixon played with Kleibrink as third at the 2012 Alberta Scotties, but played as the alternate for Nedohin at the National Scotties.)	Shannon Kleibrink	Amy Nixon	Bronwen Webster	Chelsey Matson	2012 ASTOH, STOH
2012–13	Amy Nixon	Nadine Chyz	Whitney Eckstrand	Tracy Bush	
2013–14	Amy Nixon	Nadine Chyz	Whitney Eckstrand	Heather Rogers	
2014–15	Heather Nedohin	Amy Nixon	Jocelyn Peterman	Laine Peters	2015 ASTOH
2015–16	Chelsea Carey	Amy Nixon	Jocelyn Peterman	Laine Peters	2016 ASTOH, STOH, WCC
