= Valeria Spälty =

Swiss curler

Medal record

Curling

Olympic Games
Silver medal – second place	2006 Turin	Team

World Championships
Bronze medal – third place	2008 Vernon	Team

European Championships
Gold medal – first place	2008 Örnsköldsvik	A Group
Silver medal – second place	2004 Sofia	A Group
Silver medal – second place	2005 Garmisch-Partenkirchen	A Group
Bronze medal – third place	2006 Basel	A Group

Valeria Spälty (born 24 June 1983 in Glarus) is a Swiss curler. She won the silver medal at the 2006 Winter Olympics as the second of the team skipped by Mirjam Ott.

Spälty started curling in 1992. She is right-handed.

Since 2007 Spälty and Mirjam Ott have been playing for the Curling Club Davos with two other players. With this team Spälty won the bronze medal in 2006 at the Europeans in Basel, SUI and finished in fourth place at the 2007 European Curling Championships. In March 2008 they won the bronze medal at the 2008 Vernon World Championships.

Spälty has played in 86 Games at Junior Worlds, Worlds, Europeans and Olympic Games.

She is studying Sport science, Psychology and Education at the University of Berne.

== Teams ==
Season	Skip	Third	Second	Lead	Events
2002–03	Valeria Spälty	Jaqueline Greiner	Petra Feldmann	Ursina Punchera	2002 WJCC (5th)
2003–04	Valeria Spälty	Jaqueline Greiner	Petra Feldmann	Ursina Punchera	
2004–05	Mirjam Ott	Binia Feltscher-Beeli	Valeria Spälty	Michele Moser	2004 ECC (silver) , 2005 WWCC (7th), 2005 Olympic Trials (gold)
2005–06	Mirjam Ott	Binia Feltscher-Beeli	Valeria Spälty	Michele Moser	2005 ECC (silver) , 2006 OG (silver) , 2006 National (gold)
2006–07	Mirjam Ott	Binia Feltscher-Beeli	Valeria Spälty	Janine Greiner	2006 ECC (bronze)
2007–08	Mirjam Ott	Carmen Schäfer	Valeria Spälty	Janine Greiner	2007 ECC (4th), 2008 WWCC (bronze) , 2008 National (gold)
2008–09	Mirjam Ott	Carmen Schäfer	Valeria Spälty	Janine Greiner	2008 ECC (gold) , 2009 WWCC (5th), 2009 National (gold)
