= Canad Inns Women's Classic =

World Curling Tour event

- Established: 2004
- Host city: Portage la Prairie, Manitoba
- Arena: Portage Curling Club
- Purse: CAD $60,000
- 2019 champion: (Switzerland) Elena Stern

Current edition
- 2019 Canad Inns Women's Classic

Location in Canada

The Canad Inns Women's Classic is an event on the women's World Curling Tour. It is held at the Portage Curling Club in Portage la Prairie, Manitoba.

The event was formerly the second Grand Slam event of the season on the women's World Curling Tour. It was formerly held in October at the Fort Rouge Curling Club in Winnipeg, Manitoba. It became a Grand Slam event in 2006, but was removed from the Grand Slam after the 2013–14 curling season. Since 2009, the total prize money to be given out has been $60,000. The event was also known as the "Casinos of Winnipeg Women's Curling Classic" before 2009 and the "Manitoba Lotteries Women's Curling Classic" from 2009 to 2012.

== Champions ==
Year	Winning team	Runner-up team	Purse (CAD)	Winners share
2004	(Alberta) Cheryl Bernard, Susan O'Connor, Jody McNabb, Karen Ruus	(Alberta) Shannon Kleibrink, Amy Nixon, Glenys Bakker, Sandra Jenkins	$50,000	$14,000
2005	(Manitoba) Jennifer Jones, Cathy Overton-Clapham, Jill Officer, Georgina Wheatcroft	(Alberta) Shannon Kleibrink, Amy Nixon, Glenys Bakker, Christine Keshen	$45,000	$14,000
2006	(Saskatchewan) Sherry Anderson, Kim Hodson, Heather Walsh, Donna Gignac	(Manitoba) Jennifer Jones, Cathy Overton-Clapham, Jill Officer, Dana Allerton, Janet Arnott	$45,000	$14,000
2007	(Alberta) Shannon Kleibrink, Amy Nixon, Bronwen Saunders, Chelsey Bell	(Manitoba) Jennifer Jones, Cathy Overton-Clapham, Jill Officer, Dawn Askin	$50,000	$15,000
2008	(Saskatchewan) Michelle Englot, Deanna Doig, Roberta Materi, Cindy Simmons	(British Columbia) Kelly Scott, Jeanna Schraeder, Sasha Carter, Renee Simons	$62,000	$16,000
2009	(British Columbia) Kelly Scott, Jeanna Schraeder, Sasha Carter, Jacquie Armstrong	(Manitoba) Jennifer Jones, Cathy Overton-Clapham, Jill Officer, Dawn Askin	$60,000	$15,000
2010	(Manitoba) Chelsea Carey, Kristy Jenion, Kristen Foster, Lindsay Titheridge	(Manitoba) Cathy Overton-Clapham, Breanne Meakin, Leslie Wilson, Raunora Westcott	$60,000	$15,400
2011	(Alberta) Renée Sonnenberg, Lawnie MacDonald, Kristie Moore, Rona Pasika	(Alberta) Heather Nedohin, Beth Iskiw, Jessica Mair, Laine Peters	$60,000	$15,500
2012	(Saskatchewan) Stefanie Lawton, Sherry Anderson, Sherri Singler, Marliese Kasner	(Ontario) Rachel Homan, Emma Miskew, Alison Kreviazuk, Lisa Weagle	$60,000	$15,500
2013	(Manitoba) Jennifer Jones, Kaitlyn Lawes, Jill Officer, Dawn McEwen	(Manitoba) Jill Thurston, Brette Richards, Brandi Richards, Blaine de Jager	$60,000	$15,400
2014	(Manitoba) Jennifer Jones, Kaitlyn Lawes, Jill Officer, Dawn McEwen	(Manitoba) Jill Thurston, Brette Richards, Briane Meilleur, Blaine de Jager	$60,000	$15,300
2015	(South Korea) Kim Eun-jung, Kim Kyeong-ae, Kim Seon-yeong, Kim Yeong-mi	(Manitoba) Jennifer Jones, Kaitlyn Lawes, Jill Officer, Dawn McEwen	$60,000	$15,400
2016	(Ontario) Rachel Homan, Emma Miskew, Joanne Courtney, Lisa Weagle	(Japan) Chiaki Matsumura, Emi Shimizu, Ikue Kitazawa, Hasumi Ishigooka	$60,000	$15,500
2017	(United States) Nina Roth, Tabitha Peterson, Aileen Geving, Becca Hamilton	(Sweden) Anna Hasselborg, Sara McManus, Agnes Knochenhauer, Sofia Mabergs	$60,000	$15,500
2018	(Alberta) Chelsea Carey, Sarah Wilkes, Dana Ferguson, Breanne Knapp	(Manitoba) Kerri Einarson, Val Sweeting, Shannon Birchard, Briane Meilleur	$60,000	$15,500
2019	(Switzerland) Briar Hürlimann (Fourth), Elena Stern (Skip), Lisa Gisler, Céline Koller	(Ontario) Rachel Homan, Emma Miskew, Joanne Courtney, Lisa Weagle	$60,000	$15,000
2020	Event cancelled due to the COVID-19 pandemic			

== Results ==
=== 2006 Casinos of Winnipeg Classic ===
Playoffs

Quarterfinals
(Alberta) Shannon Kleibrink	8
(United States) Cassie Johnson	1
(Saskatchewan) Sherry Anderson	9
(Alberta) Deb Santos	5
(Manitoba) Darcy Robertson	5
(Saskatchewan) Stefanie Lawton	8
(Manitoba) Jennifer Jones	5
(British Columbia) Kelley Law	3

Semifinals
(Alberta) Shannon Kleibrink	2
(Saskatchewan) Sherry Anderson	5
(Saskatchewan) Stefanie Lawton	4
(Manitoba) Jennifer Jones	9

Finals
(Saskatchewan) Sherry Anderson	6
(Manitoba) Jennifer Jones	1

=== 2007 Casinos of Winnipeg Classic ===
Playoffs

Quarterfinals
(Alberta) Cheryl Bernard	7
(Alberta) Heather Rankin	5
(United States) Debbie McCormick	5
(Manitoba) Jennifer Jones	8
(Alberta) Shannon Kleibrink	7
(Manitoba) Maureen Bonar	2
(Alberta) Cathy King	3
(Ontario) Krista McCarville	8

Semifinals
(Manitoba) Jennifer Jones	9
(Alberta) Cheryl Bernard	3
(Alberta) Shannon Kleibrink	5
(Ontario) Krista McCarville	4

Finals
(Manitoba) Jennifer Jones	5
(Alberta) Shannon Kleibrink	6
