= Shannon Kleibrink =

Canadian curler and Olympic medalist

- Curler
- Born: Shannon Getty; October 7, 1968 (age 58); Norquay, Saskatchewan, Canada

Curling career
- Hearts: 5 (1993, 2004, 2008, 2011, 2017)
- Top CTRS ranking: 1st (2004–05, 2008–09)
- Grand Slam victories: 2 (Autumn Gold, 2008; Casinos of Winnipeg, 2007
Medal record
Women's curling
Representing Canada
Winter Olympics
Bronze medal – third place	2006 Turin
Representing Alberta
Scotties Tournament of Hearts
Silver medal – second place	2008 Regina
Canadian Olympic Curling Trials
Gold medal – first place	2005 Halifax
Silver medal – second place	2009 Edmonton
Silver medal – second place	1997 Brandon

Shannon Kleibrink (born October 7, 1968 in Norquay, Saskatchewan) is a Canadian retired curler from Okotoks, Alberta. She and her team of third Amy Nixon, second Glenys Bakker, lead Christine Keshen and alternate Sandra Jenkins represented Canada at the 2006 Winter Olympics in Turin, Italy. They won a bronze medal.

== Career ==
As a junior curler, Kleibrink lost in the final of the 1987 junior provincial championships, and in the Alberta final to qualify for the Canada Winter Games, both to LaDawn Funk.

After losing in the final of the 1991 Alberta Scott Tournament of Hearts, Kleibrink won the 1993 provincial title, defeating Funk in the final. This qualified her to represent Alberta at the 1993 Scott Tournament of Hearts, Canada's national curling championship. There, her team of Sandra Jenkins, Sally Shigehiro and Joanne Wright finished 6-5. Kleibrink didn't qualify for the Scotts again until 2004, but in the meantime she made it to the final of the 1997 Olympic Trials. At the trials, where the winner played for Canada at the 1998 Winter Olympics, Kleibrink lost in the final to Sandra Schmirler. In 2004 Kleibrink became the first woman to win a Canadian Mixed Curling Championship as skip. She was also the first woman to skip a team at the mixed, when she did so the previous year, where she lost in the final. Only a few weeks later, Kleibrink and her women's team won the 2004 Alberta Scott Tournament of Hearts, defeating the defending champion Deb Santos team in the final, 6–5. At the 2004 Scott Tournament of Hearts, Kleibrink and her team of Amy Nixon, Glenys Bakker and Stephanie Marchand finished 6–5, out of the playoffs.

In 2005, Kleibrink won that year's Canada Cup where she beat Jan Betker in the final. Later on that year, Kleibrink qualified for the Olympics, when they beat Kelly Scott's team from Kelowna, British Columbia at the 2005 Canadian Olympic trials. Kleibrink's team began the tournament at 1-3 before winning seven straight games to qualify. In the final end of the championship game, Kleibrink scored 3 points to win the match 8–7. At the 2006 Olympics in Italy, Kleibrink's rink finished the round robin with a 6–3 record, qualifying for the playoffs. After losing the semifinals to Switzerland's Mirjam Ott, they played Norway's Dordi Nordby in the bronze medal game. Against Norway, Canada immediately started strong in the first end after Nordby, the Norwegian skip missed her rock on a heavy freeze attempt and Kleibrink made her last rock to score four. Canada and the Kleibrink rink never looked back, scoring four more points in the fifth end en route to winning the game 11-5, playing 75% as a team and winning the bronze medal for Canada.

Kleibrink would return to the national level 2008, winning the Alberta Scotties Tournament of Hearts by defeating Renée Sonnenberg in the final, coming back from a 5–1 deficit to win 7–6. This qualified her team to represent Alberta at the 2008 Scotties Tournament of Hearts in Regina, Saskatchewan, where she represented Alberta for a third time. There, she had her best career showing at the Hearts. They finished in first place after the round robin with a 10–1 record. They then defeated Sherry Middaugh of Ontario to advance to the finals for the first time. However, she was defeated in the championship game by Jennifer Jones of Manitoba.

The following year, Kleibrink's team lost to Heather Nedohin's rink in the 2009 Alberta Scotties Tournament of Hearts semi-final, failing to return to that year's national championships. However, Kleibrink did see some success, having won the 2009 Canada Cup of Curling, defeating Marie-France Larouche in the final. In addition, Kleibrink earned a direct berth into the 2009 Canadian Olympic Curling Trials to be held in Edmonton. At the Olympic Trials, Kleibrink missed out on her bid to return to the Olympics, losing in the final to Cheryl Bernard. Kleibrink failed to make it to the Scotties once again, losing to Valerie Sweeting in the 2010 Alberta Scotties Tournament of Hearts final.

It was announced at the 2011 Canada Cup of Curling, that following the event, Bronwen Webster, who is pregnant, will sit out the rest of the season and be replaced by Carolyn McRorie, who had filled in for Kleibrink earlier in the season, and Matson, who did not participate in the Canada Cup for family obligations.

For the 2012/2013 season, Kleibrink will add Kalynn Park to her lineup at second position. Kleibrink's longtime third Amy Nixon decided to leave and form her own rink. Bronwen Webster will move up to play third and Chelsey Matson will remain at lead. Park joined the team at the end of the 2011/2012 season, playing in one tournament, the 2012 Victoria Curling Classic Invitational, at the third position. For the 2015/2016 season, Kleibrink has added Sarah Wilkes and Alison Kotylak to her team.

After the 2017-18 season, Kleibrink announced her retirement from competitive curling.

== Personal life ==
Kleibrink works a real estate agent with CIR Realty. She is married to Richard Kleibrink and has two children. She currently coaches the Kayla Skrlik rink, and formerly coached her son, Kyler.

== Grand Slam record ==
Key
C	Champion
F	Lost in Final
SF	Lost in Semifinal
QF	Lost in Quarterfinals
R16	Lost in the round of 16
Q	Did not advance to playoffs
T2	Played in Tier 2 event
DNP	Did not participate in event
N/A	Not a Grand Slam event that season

Event	2005–06	2006–07	2007–08	2008–09	2009–10	2010–11	2011–12	2012–13	2013–14	2014–15
Masters	N/A	N/A	N/A	N/A	N/A	N/A	N/A	QF	DNP	DNP
Players'	SF	Q	Q	F	QF	QF	DNP	Q	DNP	DNP

=== Former events ===
Event	2006–07	2007–08	2008–09	2009–10	2010–11	2011–12	2012–13	2013–14	2014–15
Autumn Gold	SF	F	C	Q	QF	F	SF	Q	Q
Colonial Squares	N/A	N/A	N/A	N/A	N/A	N/A	QF	Q	DNP
Wayden Transportation	SF	QF	Q	N/A	N/A	N/A	N/A	N/A	N/A
Sobeys Slam	N/A	SF	Q	N/A	DNP	N/A	N/A	N/A	N/A
Manitoba Liquor & Lotteries	SF	C	Q	DNP	DNP	DNP	SF	Q	N/A
