= 2007 Trail Appliances Autumn Gold Curling Classic =

The 2007 Trail Appliances Autumn Gold Curling Classic was the 30th annual edition of the event. It marked the first Grand Slam event of the Women's World Curling Tour. It was held October 5-8 at the Calgary Curling Club in Calgary, Alberta. The total purse for the event was $56,000 with $14,000 going to the winning team of Jennifer Jones, Cathy Overton-Clapham, Jill Officer and Dawn Askin. They beat Shannon Kleibrink's rink in the final.

== Participating teams (skips) ==
- (Saskatchewan) Sherry Anderson
- (Alberta) Glenys Bakker
- (Alberta) Cheryl Bernard
- (Alberta) Renelle Bryden
- (Alberta) Diane Foster
- (Alberta) Brittany Gregor
- (Ontario) Jenn Hanna
- (Saskatchewan) Amber Holland
- (Nova Scotia) Colleen Jones
- (Manitoba) Jennifer Jones
- (New Brunswick) Andrea Kelly
- (Alberta) Cathy King
- (Alberta) Shannon Kleibrink
- (Saskatchewan) Stefanie Lawton
- (Alberta) Terry Loschuk
- (Ontario) Colleen Madonia
- (Saskatchewan) Jolene McIvor
- (Japan) Moe Meguro
- (Ontario) Sherry Middaugh
- (Alberta) Kristie Moore
- (Switzerland) Mirjam Ott
- (Russia) Ludmila Privivkova
- (Alberta) Heather Rankin
- (Ontario) Julie Reddick
- (Manitoba) Darcy Robertson
- (Alberta) Deb Santos
- (British Columbia) Kelly Scott
- (Alberta) Rhonda Skillen
- (Alberta) Renée Sonnenberg
- (Manitoba) Shauna Streich
- (China) Wang Bingyu
- (Alberta) Crystal Webster

== Playoffs ==
Quarterfinals
(Russia) Ludmila Privivkova	4
(Saskatchewan) Amber Holland	3
(Alberta) Shannon Kleibrink	7
(Alberta) Brittany Gregor	5
(Manitoba) Jennifer Jones	8
(British Columbia) Kelly Scott	2
(Saskatchewan) Stefanie Lawton	4
(Switzerland) Mirjam Ott	5

Semifinals
(Russia) Ludmila Privivkova	3
(Alberta) Shannon Kleibrink	8
(Manitoba) Jennifer Jones	5
(Switzerland) Mirjam Ott	4

Finals
(Alberta) Shannon Kleibrink	3
(Manitoba) Jennifer Jones	6
