= Curling at the 2006 Winter Olympics =

Curling at the XX Olympic Winter Games
- Venue: Pinerolo Palaghiaccio
- Dates: 13–24 February 2006
- Competitors: 100 from 13 nations

Men's curling at the XX Olympic Winter Games

Medalists
1st place, gold medalist(s)		Canada
2nd place, silver medalist(s)		Finland
3rd place, bronze medalist(s)		United States

Women's curling at the XX Olympic Winter Games

Medalists
1st place, gold medalist(s)		Sweden
2nd place, silver medalist(s)		Switzerland
3rd place, bronze medalist(s)		Canada

Curling at the 2006 Winter Olympics was held in the town of Pinerolo, Italy from February 13 to February 24. It proved to be the sleeper hit in terms of television ratings in Italy. According to a CBC feature, curling at the 2006 Winter Games drew 5 million viewers, eclipsing ice hockey and figure skating. This, and the success of the Italian men's curling team created a surge of interest in curling within Italy, where there was no previous tradition of the sport and only a few hundred players.

== Summary ==
Days before the 2006 Winter Games began, the IOC confirmed that the curling competition at the 1924 Winter Olympics was an official event, and not a demonstration event as many authoritative sources had previously claimed. However, the IOC itself had never done so. This official confirmation was the culmination of an investigative campaign begun by the Glasgow-based newspaper The Herald, on behalf of the families of the eight Scots who won the first curling Olympic gold medal in Chamonix, France in 1924. The winning team was selected by the Royal Caledonian Curling Club, Perth, the mother club of curling.

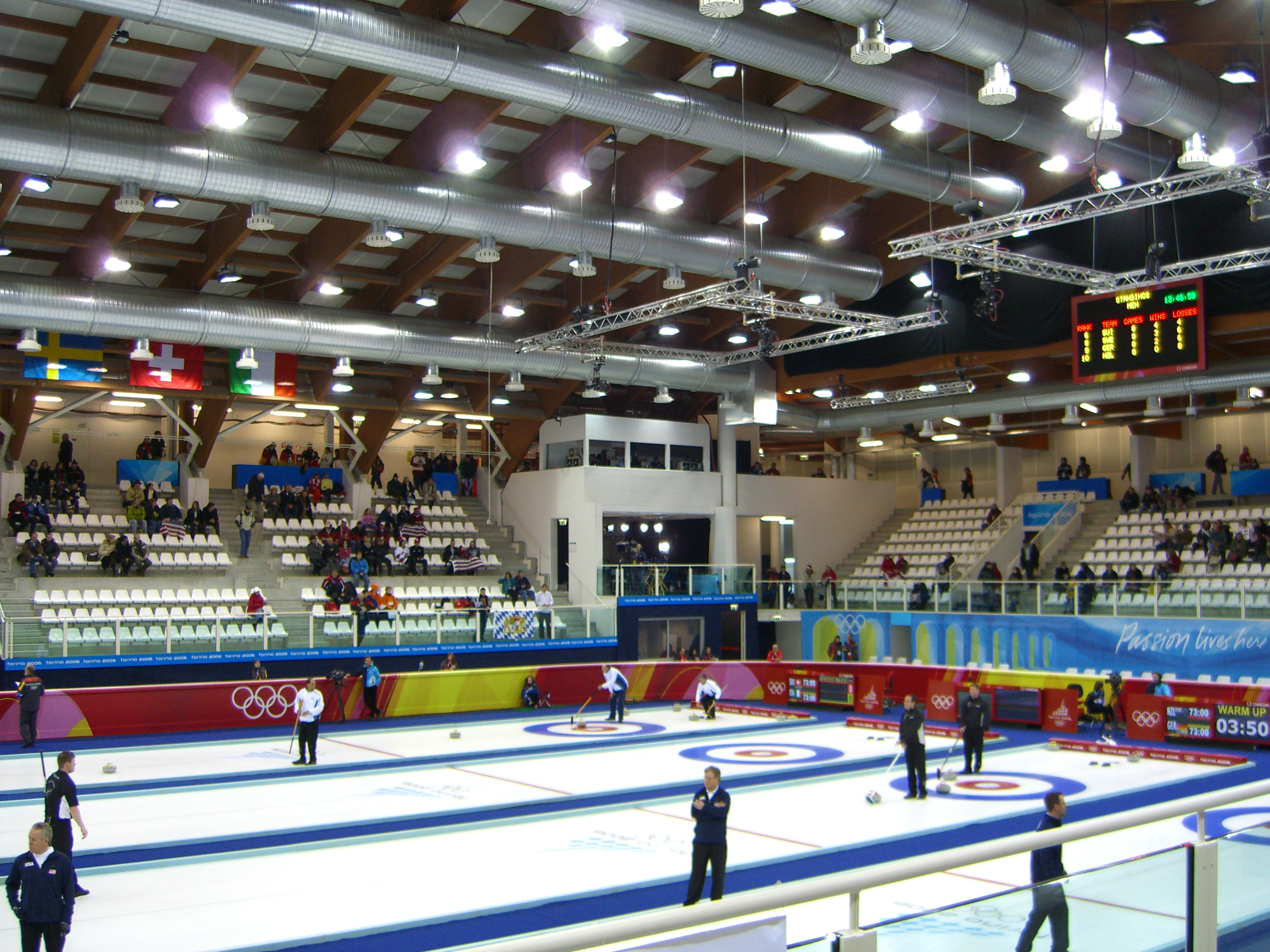
The curling arena of Pinerolo

Defending champion skips Rhona Martin of Great Britain & Northern Ireland and Pål Trulsen of Norway returned to defend their gold medals. Joining Martin on the women's side were 2005 World champion Anette Norberg of Sweden, 2002 World Junior champion Cassandra Johnson of the United States of America, two-time world champion Dordi Nordby of Norway, 1996 European champion Mirjam Ott of Switzerland, 2004 Canadian Mixed champion Shannon Kleibrink of Canada, 2005 European Junior Challenge champion Ludmila Privivkova of Russia, three time Pacific Curling champion Ayumi Onodera of Japan, 1994 European champion Dorthe Holm of Denmark, and for the host country, 2003 World Junior bronze medalist Diana Gaspari from Italy.

Joining Trulsen on the men's side was 2001 World Junior Champion Brad Gushue of Canada with the help of two-time World champion Russ Howard calling the shots, former World Junior champion and European champion David Murdoch of Great Britain, two-time European champion Andy Kapp of Germany, 2000 European champion and 2005 European mixed champion Markku Uusipaavalniemi of Finland, 1993 World Championship bronze medalist Pete Fenson of the United States of America, 1997 World Junior champion Ralph Stöckli of Switzerland, three-time Pacific Curling champion Sean Becker of New Zealand, three-time World Champion Peja Lindholm of Sweden, and the host Italian team skipped by Joel Retornaz.

Fixtures and results
Women's: Teams - Standings - Schedule - Percentages - Final standings
Draw 1 2 3 4 5 6 7 8 9 10 11 12
Semi-finals - Bronze medal game - Gold medal game
Men's: Teams - Standings - Schedule - Percentages - Final standings
Draw 1 2 3 4 5 6 7 8 9 10 11 12
Semi-finals - Bronze medal game - Gold medal game
Olympic qualifying
External links

== Men's ==
=== Men's tournament ===
Medal	Team
Gold	Brad Gushue, Mark Nichols, Russ Howard, Jamie Korab, and Mike Adam; Canada
Silver	Markku Uusipaavalniemi, Wille Mäkelä, Kalle Kiiskinen, Teemu Salo, and Jani Sullanmaa; Finland
Bronze	Pete Fenson, Shawn Rojeski, Joseph Polo, John Shuster, and Scott Baird; United States

=== Teams ===
Nation	Skip	Third	Second	Lead	Alternate	Club
Canada	Brad Gushue	Mark Nichols	Russ Howard*	Jamie Korab	Mike Adam	St. John's CC, St. John's
Finland	Markku Uusipaavalniemi	Wille Mäkelä	Kalle Kiiskinen	Teemu Salo	Jani Sullanmaa	Oulunkylä Curling, Helsinki
Germany	Andy Kapp	Uli Kapp	Oliver Axnick	Holger Höhne	Andreas Kempf	CC Füssen, Füssen
Great Britain	David Murdoch	Ewan MacDonald	Warwick Smith	Euan Byers	Craig Wilson	Lockerbie CC, Lockerbie
Italy	Joel Retornaz	Fabio Alvera	Gian Paolo Zandegiacomo	Marco Mariani	Antonio Menardi	CC Dolomiti, Cortina d'Ampezzo
New Zealand	Sean Becker	Hans Frauenlob	Dan Mustapic	Lorne De Pape	Warren Dobson	Ranfurly CC, Ranfurly
Norway	Pål Trulsen	Lars Vågberg	Flemming Davanger	Bent Ånund Ramsfjell	Torger Nergård	Stabekk CC, Oslo
Sweden	Peja Lindholm	Tomas Nordin	Magnus Swartling	Peter Narup	Anders Kraupp	Östersunds CK, Östersund
Switzerland	Ralph Stöckli	Claudio Pescia	Pascal Sieber	Marco Battilana	Simon Strübin	St Galler Bär CC, Zürich
United States	Pete Fenson	Shawn Rojeski	Joseph Polo	John Shuster	Scott Baird	Bemidji CC, Bemidji

* – Calls the game as a skip normally would
× – The Olympics have recorded the skip as Russ Howard, however the team internally considers that Brad Gushue is skip. It is a team formed by Brad Gushue.

=== Standings ===
Nation	Skip	W	L	PF	PA	Ends won	Ends lost	Blank ends	Stolen ends	Shot pct.
Finland	Markku Uusipaavalniemi	7	2	53	40	32	31	23	9	78%
Canada	Brad Gushue	6	3	66	46	47	31	9	23	80%
United States	Pete Fenson	6	3	66	47	36	33	16	13	80%
Great Britain	David Murdoch	6	3	59	49	36	31	17	12	81%
Norway	Pål Trulsen	5	4	57	47	33	32	17	9	78%
Switzerland	Ralph Stöckli	5	4	56	45	31	34	18	10	76%
Italy	Joël Retornaz	4	5	47	66	37	38	10	7	70%
Germany	Andy Kapp	3	6	53	55	34	34	17	12	77%
Sweden	Peja Lindholm	3	6	45	68	31	40	12	4	78%
New Zealand	Sean Becker	0	9	37	76	28	41	12	6	69%

=== Schedule ===
==== Draw 1 - Monday, February 13, 0900 ====
Note: in the following, the hammers denote the team that has the last stone in the first end.

Team	1	2	3	4	5	6	7	8	9	10	Final
New Zealand (Becker)	0	0	0	1	0	1	0	1	0	0	3
Sweden (Lindholm) 🔨	0	0	1	0	3	0	1	0	1	0	6

Team	1	2	3	4	5	6	7	8	9	10	Final
Italy (Retornaz) 🔨	1	0	2	0	1	0	1	0	0	0	5
Great Britain (Murdoch)	0	3	0	2	0	1	0	0	0	1	7

Team	1	2	3	4	5	6	7	8	9	10	Final
Norway (Trulsen)	1	0	0	2	0	2	0	0	X	X	5
United States (Fenson) 🔨	0	2	1	0	3	0	0	5	X	X	11

Team	1	2	3	4	5	6	7	8	9	10	Final
Finland (Uusipaavalniemi)	0	1	0	1	0	0	0	0	0	X	2
Switzerland (Stöckli) 🔨	2	0	1	0	0	1	2	0	1	X	7

==== Draw 2 - Monday, February 13, 1900 ====
Team	1	2	3	4	5	6	7	8	9	10	Final
Germany (Kapp)	2	0	2	0	0	0	0	1	0	X	5
Canada (Gushue) 🔨	0	2	0	3	1	1	1	0	2	X	10

Team	1	2	3	4	5	6	7	8	9	10	Final
Finland (Uusipaavalniemi)	0	0	0	2	0	0	0	1	0	1	4
United States (Fenson) 🔨	0	2	0	0	0	1	0	0	0	0	3

Team	1	2	3	4	5	6	7	8	9	10	Final
Great Britain (Murdoch) 🔨	0	1	4	0	0	0	3	0	2	X	10
New Zealand (Becker)	1	0	0	0	2	1	0	1	0	X	5

Team	1	2	3	4	5	6	7	8	9	10	Final
Italy (Retornaz)	0	0	1	0	0	1	0	2	0	1	5
Sweden (Lindholm) 🔨	0	2	0	1	0	0	2	0	2	0	7

==== Draw 3 - Tuesday, February 14, 1400 ====
Team	1	2	3	4	5	6	7	8	9	10	Final
Norway (Trulsen)	0	0	0	0	1	0	0	3	3	X	7
Switzerland (Stöckli) 🔨	0	0	0	1	0	1	0	0	0	X	2

Team	1	2	3	4	5	6	7	8	9	10	11	Final
Canada (Gushue) 🔨	1	0	1	0	1	0	1	0	3	0	0	7
Sweden (Lindholm)	0	2	0	1	0	1	0	1	0	2	1	8

Team	1	2	3	4	5	6	7	8	9	10	11	Final
Germany (Kapp)	0	1	2	0	1	0	0	4	0	0	0	8
Italy (Retornaz) 🔨	1	0	0	2	0	2	0	0	2	1	1	9

Team	1	2	3	4	5	6	7	8	9	10	Final
United States (Fenson)	0	2	2	0	2	1	0	3	X	X	10
New Zealand (Becker) 🔨	2	0	0	0	0	0	2	0	X	X	4

==== Draw 4 - Wednesday, February 15, 0900 ====
Team	1	2	3	4	5	6	7	8	9	10	Final
Finland (Uusipaavalniemi) 🔨	0	0	2	0	0	0	2	0	0	2	6
New Zealand (Becker)	0	2	0	0	1	1	0	1	0	0	5

Team	1	2	3	4	5	6	7	8	9	10	Final
Sweden (Lindholm)	1	0	1	1	0	1	0	0	X	X	4
Norway (Trulsen) 🔨	0	4	0	0	2	0	2	1	X	X	9

Team	1	2	3	4	5	6	7	8	9	10	Final
Canada (Gushue)	1	1	0	3	0	1	1	0	2	X	9
Great Britain (Murdoch) 🔨	0	0	2	0	1	0	0	2	0	X	5

==== Draw 5 - Wednesday, February 15, 1900 ====
Team	1	2	3	4	5	6	7	8	9	10	Final
United States (Fenson)	0	0	0	0	2	0	2	0	0	1	5
Italy (Retornaz) 🔨	0	0	1	1	0	2	0	1	1	0	6

Team	1	2	3	4	5	6	7	8	9	10	Final
Great Britain (Murdoch)	0	0	0	1	0	0	2	0	2	1	6
Norway (Trulsen) 🔨	0	1	0	0	0	1	0	1	0	0	3

Team	1	2	3	4	5	6	7	8	9	10	Final
Canada (Gushue) 🔨	1	0	0	1	1	1	1	1	0	1	7
Switzerland (Stöckli)	0	1	3	0	0	0	0	0	1	0	5

Team	1	2	3	4	5	6	7	8	9	10	Final
Germany (Kapp) 🔨	0	0	1	0	0	2	0	1	1	0	5
Finland (Uusipaavalniemi)	0	0	0	0	1	0	0	0	0	1	2

==== Draw 6 - Thursday, February 16, 1400 ====
Team	1	2	3	4	5	6	7	8	9	10	Final
Great Britain (Murdoch)	0	0	0	2	0	2	1	0	2	0	7
Germany (Kapp) 🔨	0	0	2	0	0	0	0	2	0	2	6

Team	1	2	3	4	5	6	7	8	9	10	Final
Switzerland (Stöckli) 🔨	2	0	0	0	2	0	1	3	0	1	9
New Zealand (Becker)	0	2	0	1	0	2	0	0	2	0	7

Team	1	2	3	4	5	6	7	8	9	10	Final
United States (Fenson)	0	2	0	2	0	1	0	1	2	2	10
Sweden (Lindholm) 🔨	2	0	2	0	1	0	1	0	0	0	6

Team	1	2	3	4	5	6	7	8	9	10	Final
Norway (Trulsen)	0	0	1	1	1	0	0	0	2	0	5
Canada (Gushue) 🔨	2	1	0	0	0	0	1	1	0	1	6

==== Draw 7 - Friday, February 17, 0900 ====
Team	1	2	3	4	5	6	7	8	9	10	Final
Italy (Retornaz)	0	0	2	0	1	0	0	X	X	X	3
Norway (Trulsen) 🔨	0	2	0	4	0	1	4	X	X	X	11

Team	1	2	3	4	5	6	7	8	9	10	Final
Sweden (Lindholm)	0	2	0	2	0	0	0	0	X	X	4
Finland (Uusipaavalniemi)	3	0	2	0	0	1	3	2	X	X	11

Team	1	2	3	4	5	6	7	8	9	10	Final
Switzerland (Stöckli)	2	0	0	0	0	2	0	0	4	0	8
Germany (Kapp) 🔨	0	0	0	1	1	0	1	0	0	1	5

==== Draw 8 - Friday, February 17, 1900 ====
Team	1	2	3	4	5	6	7	8	9	10	Final
Sweden (Lindholm)	0	0	2	0	0	0	0	X	X	X	2
Great Britain (Murdoch) 🔨	2	2	0	3	0	0	1	X	X	X	8

Team	1	2	3	4	5	6	7	8	9	10	Final
United States (Fenson) 🔨	0	0	2	0	0	1	1	0	2	1	7
Switzerland (Stöckli)	0	0	0	0	1	0	0	2	0	0	3

Team	1	2	3	4	5	6	7	8	9	10	Final
Finland (Uusipaavalniemi) 🔨	0	0	3	0	0	0	4	1	0	0	8
Canada (Gushue)	2	0	0	0	1	1	0	0	2	1	7

Team	1	2	3	4	5	6	7	8	9	10	11	Final
New Zealand (Becker)	0	1	0	1	0	0	1	0	1	1	0	5
Italy (Retornaz) 🔨	0	0	2	0	2	0	0	1	0	0	1	6

==== Draw 9 - Saturday, February 18, 1400 ====
Team	1	2	3	4	5	6	7	8	9	10	Final
Germany (Kapp)	0	0	1	0	1	0	2	0	1	X	5
United States (Fenson) 🔨	2	1	0	0	0	2	0	3	0	0	8

Team	1	2	3	4	5	6	7	8	9	10	11	Final
Canada (Gushue)	0	0	1	0	0	1	1	0	2	1	0	6
Italy (Retornaz) 🔨	2	1	0	1	1	0	0	1	0	0	1	7

Team	1	2	3	4	5	6	7	8	9	10	Final
Switzerland (Stöckli) 🔨	2	0	0	0	0	0	1	2	0	0	5
Great Britain (Murdoch)	0	1	1	0	1	0	0	0	2	1	6

Team	1	2	3	4	5	6	7	8	9	10	Final
Finland (Uusipaavalniemi) 🔨	1	0	0	1	3	0	1	0	0	1	7
Norway (Trulsen)	0	0	1	0	0	1	0	1	0	0	3

==== Draw 10 - Sunday, February 19, 0900 ====
Team	1	2	3	4	5	6	7	8	9	10	Final
Norway (Trulsen)	0	2	0	0	3	0	1	0	2	1	9
New Zealand (Becker) 🔨	1	0	1	0	0	2	0	2	0	0	6

Team	1	2	3	4	5	6	7	8	9	10	Final
Germany (Kapp)	0	0	0	1	0	4	1	0	0	1	7
Sweden (Lindholm) 🔨	0	1	0	0	2	0	0	1	1	0	5

Team	1	2	3	4	5	6	7	8	9	10	Final
Italy (Retornaz) 🔨	0	1	0	1	1	0	1	0	0	0	4
Finland (Uusipaavalniemi)	1	0	2	0	0	2	0	0	1	1	7

Team	1	2	3	4	5	6	7	8	9	10	Final
Great Britain (Murdoch)	0	1	0	2	1	0	0	1	2	1	8
United States (Fenson) 🔨	2	0	4	0	0	1	2	0	0	0	9

==== Draw 11 - Sunday, February 19, 1900 ====
Team	1	2	3	4	5	6	7	8	9	10	Final
Great Britain (Murdoch) 🔨	0	0	0	0	1	0	0	0	1	X	2
Finland (Uusipaavalniemi)	0	0	3	0	0	1	1	0	0	X	5

Team	1	2	3	4	5	6	7	8	9	10	Final
New Zealand (Becker) 🔨	0	0	0	0	1	0	0	X	X	X	1
Canada (Gushue)	1	1	0	1	0	3	3	X	X	X	9

Team	1	2	3	4	5	6	7	8	9	10	Final
Sweden (Lindholm) 🔨	0	0	2	0	0	1	0	0	0	X	3
Switzerland (Stöckli)	0	1	0	0	2	0	1	3	1	X	8

Team	1	2	3	4	5	6	7	8	9	10	Final
Norway (Trulsen) 🔨	0	0	1	0	0	2	0	1	0	1	5
Germany (Kapp)	0	1	0	0	1	0	0	0	0	0	2

==== Draw 12 - Monday, February 20, 1400 ====
Team	1	2	3	4	5	6	7	8	9	10	Final
Switzerland (Stöckli) 🔨	4	0	1	0	3	2	X	X	X	X	10
Italy (Retornaz)	0	1	0	1	0	0	X	X	X	X	2

Team	1	2	3	4	5	6	7	8	9	10	Final
New Zealand (Becker)	0	1	0	0	0	0	X	X	X	X	1
Germany (Kapp) 🔨	2	0	3	2	2	1	X	X	X	X	10

Team	1	2	3	4	5	6	7	8	9	10	Final
Canada (Gushue) 🔨	0	0	0	2	0	0	0	2	1	1	6
United States (Fenson)	1	0	0	0	1	0	1	0	0	0	3

==== Semi-finals - Wednesday, February 22, 1900 ====
1 vs. 4

In a close game, where both teams played extremely well, the game came down to the last rock of the tenth end. Finland (1) had the hammer, and skip Markku Uusipaavalniemi had to put a rock right on the button to win the game. It was either that or a difficult hit and roll off a British (4) rock in the four-foot frozen to a Finnish rock. British skip David Murdoch had an excellent raise hit and roll to make the freeze on his last rock, but it was no match for Markku's draw—giving Finland the win.

Team	1	2	3	4	5	6	7	8	9	10	Final
Finland (Uusipaavalniemi) 🔨	0	1	0	0	0	2	0	0	0	1	4
Great Britain (Murdoch)	0	0	0	0	1	0	1	0	1	0	3

Player percentages
Finland		Great Britain	
Teemu Salo	84%	Euan Byers	89%
Kalle Kiiskinen	94%	Warwick Smith	89%
Wille Mäkelä	78%	Ewan MacDonald	89%
Markku Uusipaavalniemi	88%	David Murdoch	80%
Total	86%	Total	87%

2 vs. 3

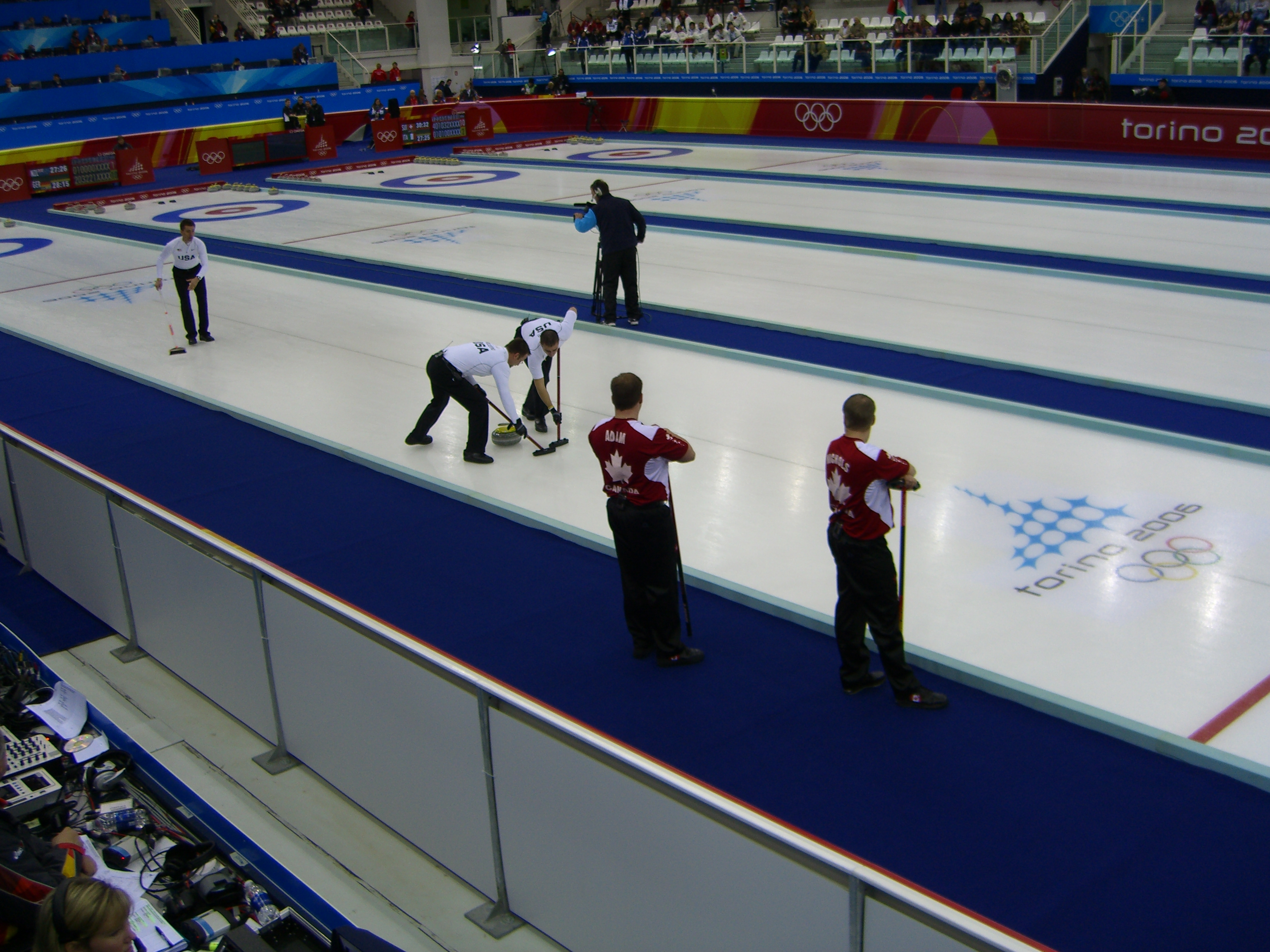
Semi-final USA vs. Canada

In the other semi-final, Canada (2) outplayed the Americans (3) for most of the game propelling them to victory. The Americans kept it close for most of the game, always within a few points until the ninth end. With Canada having the hammer, USA skip Pete Fenson had a difficult draw to beat out four Canadian stones and get buried but half of the rock was left out in the open. Canada's skip Brad Gushue peeled off Fenson's rock on his last, giving Gushue five points, at which point the American team conceded.

Team	1	2	3	4	5	6	7	8	9	10	Final
Canada (Gushue) 🔨	0	2	0	2	0	2	0	0	5	X	11
United States (Fenson)	1	0	1	0	1	0	0	2	0	X	5

Player percentages
Canada		United States	
Jamie Korab	71%	John Shuster	79%
Russ Howard	82%	Joseph Polo	79%
Mark Nichols	94%	Shawn Rojeski	63%
Brad Gushue	83%	Pete Fenson	79%
Total	82%	Total	75%

==== Bronze medal game - Friday, February 24, 1300 ====
US skip Pete Fenson got the victory after hitting a British stone in the open on his last shot of the game, giving him the only point he needed in the 8–6 victory. The momentum for the Americans began in the third end however, when the Americans scored a three-ender. David Murdoch, the British skip tried to draw to the button on top of two American stones, but was a few inches short, leaving the rock in the open. It was easily tapped out by Fenson giving the Americans three points, and they never trailed after that point, going on to win the country's first Olympic curling medal. The game was interrupted by a streaker wearing a rubber chicken, prompting one of the British players to joke, "Are you Scottish?"

Team	1	2	3	4	5	6	7	8	9	10	Final
United States (Fenson) 🔨	1	0	3	0	0	2	0	1	0	1	8
Great Britain (Murdoch)	0	1	0	1	0	0	3	0	1	0	6

Player percentages
Great Britain		United States	
Euan Byers	94%	John Shuster	75%
Warwick Smith	85%	Joseph Polo	95%
Ewan MacDonald	88%	Shawn Rojeski	94%
David Murdoch	79%	Pete Fenson	83%
Total	86%	Total	87%

==== Gold medal game - Friday, February 24, 1730 ====
After Finland skip Markku Uusipaavalniemi missed an opportunity with the hammer in the 1st end, scoring only two points instead of three (0-2), Canada dominated and scored two points with the hammer in the 2nd end (2-2) before stealing the next two ends with a point in each (4-2). Finland finally won a point with the hammer in the 5th end to reduce the deficit (4-3), but numerous Finnish mistakes led to Canada's scoring six points in the 6th end (10-3), which effectively won the match and secured the gold medal. Brad Gushue of Canada actually had the chance to score an unusual seventh point with the hammer, but his draw shot had too much weight and together with some furious sweeping at the house by the Finland skip, it passed through the house. As it is, six is very unusual as well, and Gushue blamed the miss on nerves.

However, Gushue's miss was of little consequence due to Canada's lead. By this time, Finland wanted to concede, but had to carry on until the 8th end before being allowed to do so. They finished 10–4 with no points in the 7th end and one point in the 8th end. It was Canada's first gold medal in men's curling after winning silver at Nagano in 1998 and Salt Lake City in 2002. School children in Newfoundland and Labrador, where four of the five Canadians are from, had the afternoon off from school to watch the game. Those four Newfoundlanders were the first to ever win a gold medal at the Olympics. Mark Nichols, Canada's third, played phenomenally with a 97% shooting percentage. His raise-triple take-out in the sixth end was a major factor in Canada's scoring the six-point rarity.

Team	1	2	3	4	5	6	7	8	9	10	Final
Finland (Uusipaavalniemi) 🔨	2	0	0	0	1	0	0	1	X	X	4
Canada (Gushue)	0	2	1	1	0	6	0	0	X	X	10

Player percentages
Canada		Finland	
Jamie Korab	88%	Teemu Salo	86%
Russ Howard	75%	Kalle Kiiskinen	80%
Mark Nichols	97%	Wille Mäkelä	53%
Brad Gushue	72%	Markku Uusipaavalniemi	57%
Total	83%	Total	69%

=== Round robin final player percentages ===
Minimum 6 games. Five best players from each position

Lead	Nation	%
Euan Byers	Great Britain	84
Holger Höhne	Germany	83
Jamie Korab	Canada	83
Bent Ånund Ramsfjell	Norway	83
Peter Narup	Sweden	82

Second	Nation	%
Warwick Smith	Great Britain	85
Magnus Swartling	Sweden	81
Joe Polo	United States	80
Russ Howard	Canada	79
Oliver Axnick	Germany	76
Flemming Davanger	Norway	76

Third	Nation	%
Shawn Rojeski	United States	83
Uli Kapp	Germany	80
Ewan MacDonald	Great Britain	78
Wille Mäkelä	Finland	78
Mark Nichols	Canada	77

Skip	Nation	%
Markku Uusipaavalniemi	Finland	81
Brad Gushue	Canada	77
Ralph Stöckli	Switzerland	77
Pål Trulsen	Norway	77
David Murdoch	Great Britain	76

=== Final standings ===
Rank	Country	Skip	W	L
1st place, gold medalist(s)	Canada	Brad Gushue	8	3
2nd place, silver medalist(s)	Finland	Markku Uusipaavalniemi	8	3
3rd place, bronze medalist(s)	United States	Pete Fenson	7	4
4	(United Kingdom) Great Britain	David Murdoch	6	5
5	Norway	Pål Trulsen	5	4
5	Switzerland	Ralph Stöckli	5	4
7	Italy	Joël Retornaz	4	5
8	Germany	Andy Kapp	3	6
9	Sweden	Peja Lindholm	3	6
10	New Zealand	Sean Becker	0	9

== Women's ==
=== Women's tournament ===
Medal	Team
Gold	Anette Norberg, Eva Lund, Cathrine Lindahl, Anna Svärd, and Ulrika Bergman; Sweden
Silver	Mirjam Ott, Binia Beeli, Valeria Spälty, Michèle Moser, and Manuela Kormann; Switzerland
Bronze	Shannon Kleibrink, Amy Nixon, Glenys Bakker, Christine Keshen, and Sandra Jenkins; Canada

=== Teams ===
Nation	Skip	Third	Second	Lead	Alternate	Club
Canada	Shannon Kleibrink	Amy Nixon	Glenys Bakker	Christine Keshen	Sandra Jenkins	Calgary Winter Club, Calgary
Denmark	Dorthe Holm	Denise Dupont	Lene Nielsen	Malene Krause	Maria Poulsen	Hvidovre CC, Hvidovre
Great Britain	Rhona Martin	Jackie Lockhart	Kelly Wood	Lynn Cameron	Deborah Knox	Greenacres CC, Howwood
Italy	Diana Gaspari	Giulia Lacedelli	Rosa Pompanin	Violetta Caldart	Eleonora Alvera	New Wave CC, Cortina d'Ampezzo
Japan	Ayumi Onodera	Yumie Hayashi	Mari Motohashi	Moe Meguro	Sakurako Terada	Aomori CC, Aomori
Norway	Dordi Nordby	Marianne Haslum	Marianne Rørvik	Camilla Holth	Charlotte Hovring	Snarøen CC, Bærum
Russia	Ludmila Privivkova	Nkeiruka Ezekh	Olga Jarkova	Ekaterina Galkina	Yana Nekrasova	Сombined team
Sweden	Anette Norberg	Eva Lund	Cathrine Lindahl	Anna Svärd	Ulrika Bergman	Härnösands CK Härnösand
Switzerland	Mirjam Ott	Binia Beeli	Valeria Spälty	Michèle Moser	Manuela Kormann	Flims CC, Flims
United States	Cassandra Johnson	Jamie Johnson	Jessica Schultz	Maureen Brunt	Courtney George	Bemidji CC, Bemidji

=== Standings ===
Nation	Skip	W	L	PF	PA	Ends won	Ends lost	Blank ends	Stolen ends	Shot pct.
Sweden	Anette Norberg	7	2	61	54	41	36	14	11	79%
Switzerland	Mirjam Ott	7	2	74	44	37	32	11	10	75%
Canada	Shannon Kleibrink	6	3	68	51	39	32	16	10	75%
Norway	Dordi Nordby	6	3	73	54	45	32	5	16	73%
Great Britain	Rhona Martin	5	4	55	54	31	35	17	6	76%
Russia	Ludmila Privivkova	5	4	57	60	41	36	14	11	77%
Japan	Ayumi Onodera	4	5	53	59	36	35	16	11	72%
United States	Cassandra Johnson	2	7	58	66	34	38	11	9	73%
Denmark	Dorthe Holm	2	7	47	69	27	42	12	3	72%
Italy	Diana Gaspari	1	8	44	79	33	43	9	4	66%

=== Schedule ===
==== Draw 1 - Monday, February 13, 1400 ====
Note: hammers denote the team that had the last stone in the first end.

Team	1	2	3	4	5	6	7	8	9	10	Final
Norway (Nordby)	0	1	0	0	3	0	3	2	1	1	11
United States (Johnson) 🔨	2	0	1	1	0	2	0	0	0	0	6

Team	1	2	3	4	5	6	7	8	9	10	Final
Canada (Kleibrink)	0	0	0	2	0	0	2	0	1	0	5
Sweden (Norberg) 🔨	0	0	2	0	2	0	0	2	0	1	7

Team	1	2	3	4	5	6	7	8	9	10	Final
Switzerland (Ott)	0	0	4	0	2	0	3	2	X	X	11
Italy (Gaspari) 🔨	1	0	0	2	0	1	0	0	X	X	4

Team	1	2	3	4	5	6	7	8	9	10	Final
Great Britain (Martin) 🔨	0	1	0	0	0	1	0	0	0	1	3
Denmark (Holm)	0	0	0	0	1	0	0	1	0	0	2

==== Draw 2 - Tuesday, February 14, 0900 ====
Team	1	2	3	4	5	6	7	8	9	10	Final
Russia (Privivkova) 🔨	1	0	0	0	0	1	2	0	0	3	7
Japan (Onodera)	0	0	1	1	2	0	0	1	0	0	5

Team	1	2	3	4	5	6	7	8	9	10	Final
Switzerland (Ott)	0	0	0	2	1	0	1	0	0	0	4
Great Britain (Martin) 🔨	0	0	2	0	0	1	0	1	0	1	5

Team	1	2	3	4	5	6	7	8	9	10	Final
Norway (Nordby) 🔨	0	0	0	2	1	1	0	0	2	4	10
Sweden (Norberg)	0	0	1	0	0	0	1	1	0	0	3

Team	1	2	3	4	5	6	7	8	9	10	Final
United States (Johnson)	0	0	1	0	2	0	2	0	X	X	5
Canada (Kleibrink) 🔨	5	1	0	1	0	3	0	1	X	X	11

==== Draw 3 - Tuesday, February 14, 1900 ====
Team	1	2	3	4	5	6	7	8	9	10	Final
Italy (Gaspari)	0	3	0	1	0	2	0	1	0	0	7
Denmark (Holm) 🔨	1	0	1	0	4	0	3	0	1	0	10

Team	1	2	3	4	5	6	7	8	9	10	11	Final
United States (Johnson) 🔨	2	0	0	0	1	0	1	0	1	0	0	5
Japan (Onodera)	0	0	2	1	0	0	0	2	0	0	1	6

Team	1	2	3	4	5	6	7	8	9	10	Final
Canada (Kleibrink)	0	0	1	0	0	2	0	2	0	1	6
Russia (Privivkova) 🔨	0	0	0	1	1	0	1	0	2	0	5

Team	1	2	3	4	5	6	7	8	9	10	Final
Norway (Nordby)	0	1	0	0	0	1	0	X	X	X	2
Switzerland (Ott) 🔨	2	0	1	1	1	0	4	X	X	X	9

==== Draw 4 - Wednesday, February 15, 1400 ====
Team	1	2	3	4	5	6	7	8	9	10	Final
Sweden (Norberg) 🔨	1	2	2	0	1	0	0	1	0	1	8
Great Britain (Martin)	0	0	0	2	0	2	0	0	2	0	6

Team	1	2	3	4	5	6	7	8	9	10	Final
Italy (Gaspari) 🔨	1	0	1	0	1	0	1	0	0	2	6
Russia (Privivkova)	0	1	0	1	0	1	0	0	1	0	4

Team	1	2	3	4	5	6	7	8	9	10	Final
Japan (Onodera) 🔨	0	0	0	0	0	2	0	2	0	X	4
Norway (Nordby)	1	0	0	3	1	0	2	0	2	X	9

Team	1	2	3	4	5	6	7	8	9	10	Final
Denmark (Holm)	0	0	1	0	0	2	0	0	0	0	3
United States (Johnson) 🔨	0	1	0	1	2	0	0	1	1	2	8

==== Draw 5 - Thursday, February 16, 0900 ====
Team	1	2	3	4	5	6	7	8	9	10	Final
Canada (Kleibrink) 🔨	0	1	0	0	2	0	1	0	1	0	5
Switzerland (Ott)	0	0	0	3	0	0	0	2	0	1	6

Team	1	2	3	4	5	6	7	8	9	10	Final
Japan (Onodera)	0	1	2	1	0	0	0	1	0	0	5
Denmark (Holm) 🔨	1	0	0	0	3	2	0	0	2	1	9

Team	1	2	3	4	5	6	7	8	9	10	Final
Russia (Privivkova)	0	2	0	0	2	0	0	0	0	0	4
Great Britain (Martin) 🔨	2	0	4	1	0	0	0	0	2	1	10

Team	1	2	3	4	5	6	7	8	9	10	Final
Sweden (Norberg)	0	0	2	0	3	0	1	0	1	1	8
Italy (Gaspari) 🔨	0	1	0	1	0	1	0	1	0	0	4

==== Draw 6 - Thursday, February 16, 1900 ====
Team	1	2	3	4	5	6	7	8	9	10	11	Final
Sweden (Norberg) 🔨	0	1	0	0	0	0	1	1	0	1	1	5
United States (Johnson)	0	0	1	0	1	0	0	0	2	0	0	4

Team	1	2	3	4	5	6	7	8	9	10	Final
Denmark (Holm)	0	0	1	1	0	0	0	X	X	X	2
Switzerland (Ott) 🔨	0	3	0	0	1	3	3	X	X	X	10

Team	1	2	3	4	5	6	7	8	9	10	Final
Canada (Kleibrink)	0	2	0	2	0	1	0	3	2	0	10
Norway (Nordby) 🔨	1	0	2	0	2	0	1	0	0	2	8

==== Draw 7 - Friday, February 17, 1400 ====
Team	1	2	3	4	5	6	7	8	9	10	11	Final
United States (Johnson)	0	0	2	0	0	0	2	0	0	3	0	7
Russia (Privivkova) 🔨	0	2	0	1	1	2	0	1	0	0	1	8

Team	1	2	3	4	5	6	7	8	9	10	11	Final
Norway (Nordby)	1	0	1	0	2	0	0	2	0	1	2	9
Italy (Gaspari) 🔨	0	2	0	1	0	1	2	0	1	0	0	7

Team	1	2	3	4	5	6	7	8	9	10	Final
Great Britain (Martin)	0	0	0	0	2	0	0	1	0	X	3
Canada (Kleibrink) 🔨	0	2	1	1	0	0	1	0	4	X	9

Team	1	2	3	4	5	6	7	8	9	10	Final
Switzerland (Ott)	2	0	1	0	0	1	0	2	0	1	7
Sweden (Norberg) 🔨	0	1	0	2	0	0	2	0	4	0	9

==== Draw 8 - Saturday, February 18, 0900 ====
Team	1	2	3	4	5	6	7	8	9	10	Final
Great Britain (Martin) 🔨	0	0	2	0	2	0	2	0	2	1	9
Italy (Gaspari)	0	1	0	2	0	1	0	1	0	0	5

Team	1	2	3	4	5	6	7	8	9	10	Final
Russia (Privivkova)	0	0	1	0	1	0	0	1	0	1	4
Switzerland (Ott) 🔨	1	2	0	1	0	0	3	0	0	0	7

Team	1	2	3	4	5	6	7	8	9	10	Final
Sweden (Norberg)	0	2	0	0	2	2	4	0	X	X	10
Denmark (Holm) 🔨	1	0	3	0	0	0	0	1	X	X	5

Team	1	2	3	4	5	6	7	8	9	10	Final
Japan (Onodera) 🔨	0	0	2	1	0	0	1	0	0	1	5
Canada (Kleibrink)	0	0	0	0	0	1	0	1	0	0	2

==== Draw 9 - Saturday, February 18, 1900 ====
Team	1	2	3	4	5	6	7	8	9	10	11	Final
Japan (Onodera) 🔨	1	2	0	0	2	0	0	1	0	1	0	7
Sweden (Norberg)	0	0	0	2	0	2	1	0	2	0	1	8

Team	1	2	3	4	5	6	7	8	9	10	Final
Great Britain (Martin)	0	0	3	0	0	0	1	0	0	X	4
Norway (Nordby) 🔨	2	0	0	1	1	1	0	1	2	X	8

Team	1	2	3	4	5	6	7	8	9	10	Final
Italy (Gaspari)	0	0	0	0	3	0	X	X	X	X	3
United States (Johnson) 🔨	0	2	3	2	0	4	X	X	X	X	11

==== Draw 10 - Sunday, February 19, 1400 ====
Team	1	2	3	4	5	6	7	8	9	10	Final
Switzerland (Ott)	0	2	2	0	0	1	0	1	0	3	9
United States (Johnson) 🔨	2	0	0	1	2	0	2	0	1	0	8

Team	1	2	3	4	5	6	7	8	9	10	Final
Italy (Gaspari)	0	0	0	2	0	1	1	0	0	X	4
Canada (Kleibrink) 🔨	1	2	2	0	2	0	0	2	2	X	11

Team	1	2	3	4	5	6	7	8	9	10	Final
Great Britain (Martin)	0	0	0	1	0	3	0	1	0	X	5
Japan (Onodera) 🔨	0	2	1	0	3	0	1	0	3	X	10

Team	1	2	3	4	5	6	7	8	9	10	Final
Russia (Privivkova) 🔨	1	1	0	2	1	0	1	2	0	1	9
Denmark (Holm)	0	0	2	0	0	2	0	0	3	0	7

==== Draw 11 - Monday, February 20, 0900 ====
Team	1	2	3	4	5	6	7	8	9	10	Final
Sweden (Norberg) 🔨	0	0	0	2	0	0	0	1	0	1	4
Russia (Privivkova)	0	1	0	0	1	1	1	0	2	0	6

Team	1	2	3	4	5	6	7	8	9	10	Final
Denmark (Holm)	0	0	1	0	0	0	X	X	X	X	1
Norway (Nordby) 🔨	3	1	0	1	1	2	X	X	X	X	8

Team	1	2	3	4	5	6	7	8	9	10	Final
Italy (Gaspari) 🔨	1	0	0	1	0	1	1	0	0	0	4
Japan (Onodera)	0	1	0	0	1	0	0	2	0	2	6

==== Draw 12 - Monday, February 20, 1900 ====
Team	1	2	3	4	5	6	7	8	9	10	Final
Denmark (Holm) 🔨	2	0	3	0	0	0	1	0	2	0	8
Canada (Kleibrink)	0	3	0	3	0	1	0	1	0	1	9

Team	1	2	3	4	5	6	7	8	9	10	Final
Switzerland (Ott) 🔨	1	2	0	4	0	0	0	4	X	X	11
Japan (Onodera)	0	0	2	0	1	1	1	0	X	X	5

Team	1	2	3	4	5	6	7	8	9	10	Final
Norway (Nordby)	0	2	0	1	0	2	0	2	1	0	8
Russia (Privivkova) 🔨	2	0	1	0	3	0	3	0	0	1	10

Team	1	2	3	4	5	6	7	8	9	10	Final
United States (Johnson)	0	1	0	3	0	0	X	X	X	X	4
Great Britain (Martin) 🔨	2	0	4	0	3	1	X	X	X	X	10

==== Semi-finals - Wednesday, February 22, 1400 ====
1 vs. 4
In a close game, Sweden's Anette Norberg (1) edged out Norway's Dordi Nordby (4). The turning point of the game came in the eighth end when Sweden scored the only steal of the game. From this point on the Swedish team was ahead. Anette Norberg curled 85% while Dordi Nordby struggled, which was the difference in the game.

Team	1	2	3	4	5	6	7	8	9	10	Final
Sweden (Norberg)	0	0	1	0	1	0	1	1	0	1	5
Norway (Nordby) 🔨	1	0	0	1	0	1	0	0	1	0	4

Player percentages
Sweden		Norway	
Anna Svärd	86%	Camilla Holth	71%
Cathrine Lindahl	79%	Marianne Rørvik	86%
Eva Lund	93%	Marianne Haslum	79%
Anette Norberg	86%	Dordi Nordby	68%
Total	86%	Total	76%

2 vs. 3
In the other semi-final, Canada's Shannon Kleibrink team (3) faced off against Mirjam Ott of Switzerland (2). After Ott scored 3 in the third end getting a split off a rock in front of the house, Kleibrink was unable to mount a comeback. The Swiss team managed to keep in the lead for the rest of the game. Mirjam Ott curling 88% in the game ensured victory for the Swiss team, while Shannon Kleibrink struggled at 66%.

Team	1	2	3	4	5	6	7	8	9	10	Final
Switzerland (Ott)	0	0	3	0	1	1	0	2	0	0	7
Canada (Kleibrink) 🔨	0	1	0	1	0	0	2	0	1	0	5

Player percentages
Switzerland		Canada	
Michèle Moser	74%	Christine Keshen	84%
Valeria Spälty	70%	Glenys Bakker	61%
Binia Beeli	70%	Amy Nixon	65%
Mirjam Ott	88%	Shannon Kleibrink	66%
Total	75%	Total	69%

==== Bronze medal game - Thursday, February 23, 1300 ====
Canada scored four in the first end after Dordi Nordby, the Norwegian skip flopped her rock over on a heavy freeze attempt and was removed by Shannon Kleibrink, the Canadian skip on her last rock. With three other Canadian rocks in the house, Canada scored four. Canada never looked back, scoring four more points in the fifth end en route to an 11-5 thrashing of Norway.

Team	1	2	3	4	5	6	7	8	9	10	Final
Norway (Nordby)	0	0	1	1	0	2	0	1	X	X	5
Canada (Kleibrink) 🔨	4	1	0	0	4	0	2	0	X	X	11

Player percentages
Canada		Norway	
Christine Keshen	83%	Camilla Holth	92%
Glenys Bakker	73%	Marianne Rørvik	70%
Amy Nixon	80%	Marianne Haslum	72%
Shannon Kleibrink	66%	Dordi Nordby	56%
Total	75%	Total	73%

==== Gold medal game - Thursday, February 23, 1730 ====
Sweden held the lead for much of the game, but saw the Swiss team start to claw back late in the game. In the 8th end, a decision by Swedish skip Anette Norberg to hit an unthreatening rock out of the house on her last rock instead of a guard was followed by a great raise of a Swiss rock on to a small corner of the button by Swiss skip Mirjam Ott. This brought the Swiss within one point of a tie. They continued to claw back, and after ten ends the game was tied, so they had to go to another. In the 11th end, the Swiss played a good end, leaving Anette Norberg a difficult double take-out on her last rock to win the gold medal. Norberg was successful, leaving her stone in the house to win the game, and the gold medal, 7–6.

Team	1	2	3	4	5	6	7	8	9	10	11	Final
Sweden (Norberg) 🔨	0	2	0	1	0	1	1	0	1	0	1	7
Switzerland (Ott)	0	0	2	0	0	0	0	2	0	2	0	6

Player percentages
Sweden		Switzerland	
Anna Svärd	61%	Michèle Moser	83%
Cathrine Lindahl	82%	Valeria Spälty	66%
Eva Lund	69%	Binia Beeli	80%
Anette Norberg	83%	Mirjam Ott	85%
Total	74%	Total	78%

=== Round robin final player percentages ===
Minimum 6 games. Five best players from each position

Lead	Nation	%
Christine Keshen	Canada	81
Lynn Cameron	Great Britain	79
Malene Krause	Denmark	79
Ekaterina Galkina	Russia	78
Anna Svärd	Sweden	78

Second	Nation	%
Nkeirouka Ezekh	Russia	79
Valeria Spälty	Switzerland	79
Cathrine Lindahl	Sweden	78
Mari Motohashi	Japan	73
Lene Nielsen	Denmark	72
Marianne Rørvik	Norway	72
Kelly Wood	Great Britain	72

Third	Nation	%
Eva Lund	Sweden	80
Marianne Haslum	Norway	78
Binia Beeli	Switzerland	77
Yumie Hayashi	Japan	77
Olga Jarkova	Russia	75

Skip	Nation	%
Anette Norberg	Sweden	79
Shannon Kleibrink	Canada	76
Rhona Martin	Great Britain	75
Mirjam Ott	Switzerland	75
Dordi Nordby	Norway	72

=== Final standings ===
Rank	Country	Skip	W	L
1st place, gold medalist(s)	Sweden	Anette Norberg	9	2
2nd place, silver medalist(s)	Switzerland	Mirjam Ott	8	3
3rd place, bronze medalist(s)	Canada	Shannon Kleibrink	7	4
4	Norway	Dordi Nordby	6	5
5	(United Kingdom) Great Britain	Rhona Martin	5	4
5	Russia	Ludmila Privivkova	5	4
7	Japan	Ayumi Onodera	4	5
8	United States	Cassandra Johnson	2	7
9	Denmark	Dorthe Holm	2	7
10	Italy	Diana Gaspari	1	8

== Olympic qualifying ==
=== Canada ===
The Canadian Olympic trials took place December 3–11, 2005 in Halifax, Nova Scotia.

==== Women ====
Team	W	L
Kelly Scott	7	2
Shannon Kleibrink	6	3
Stefanie Lawton	6	3
Sherry Middaugh	6	3
Sherry Anderson	5	4
Jennifer Jones	5	4
Jan Betker	4	5
Colleen Jones	3	6
Jo-Ann Rizzo	2	7
Marie-France Larouche	1	8

Tie-Breaker

- Lawton 9-4 Middaugh

Playoffs

- Semi-Final: Kleibrink 5-4 Lawton
- Final: Kleibrink 8-7 Scott

==== Men ====
Team	W	L
Brad Gushue	8	1
Jeff Stoughton	7	2
John Morris	6	3
Glenn Howard	5	4
Pat Ryan	5	4
Kevin Martin	4	5
Randy Ferbey	4	5
Shawn Adams	3	6
Mark Dacey	3	6
Jay Peachey	0	9

Playoffs

- Semi-Final: Stoughton 8-6 Morris
- Final: Gushue 8-7 Stoughton

=== Germany ===
The German Olympic trials were held on three weekends as part of a triple round-robin with no playoffs. The first weekend was played in Schwenningen on February 20–22 The second in Hamburg on March 3–6 and the third weekend was played in Baden-Hills on March 11–13. Only the men's teams qualified for the Olympics.

Final standings

Team	W	L
Andy Kapp	8	2
Andy Lang	6	5
Christopher Bartsch	5	5
Sebastian Stock	4	6
Christian Baumann	3	8

=== Switzerland ===
The Swiss Olympic trials were held March 3–6, 2005 in Bern.

==== Women ====
Team	W	L
Mirjam Ott	3	0
Luzia Ebnöther	2	1
Silvana Tirinzoni	1	2
Nicole Strausak	0	3

Playoffs

- 1 vs. 2: (best of 3) Ott 9-3 Ebnöther; Ebnöther 4-5 Ott
- 3 vs. 4: (best of 3) Trinzoni 5-11 Strausak; Strausak 2-8 Trinzoni; Trinzoni 8-9 Strausak
- Semi-final: (best of 3) Ebnöther 3-7 Strausak; Strausak 4-8 Ebnöther; Ebnöther 10-5 Strausak
- Final: (best of 3) Ott 7-4 Ebnöther; Ebnöther 9-3 Ott; Ott 8-7 Ebnöther (EE)

==== Men ====
Team	W	L
Ralph Stöckli	4	0
Andreas Schwaller	1	3
Bernhard Wethermann	1	3

Playoffs

- Final: (best of 5) Stöckli 6-8 Schwaller; Schwaller 5-3 Stöckli; Stöckli 7-5 Schwaller; Schwaller 3-8 Stöckli; Stöckli 6-4 Schwaller

=== United States ===
The U.S. Olympic trials were held February 19–26, 2005 in McFarland, Wisconsin. They double as the qualifying tournament to the 2005 Ford World Men's Curling Championship and the 2005 Ford World Women's Curling Championship.
Results:

==== Women ====
Team	W	L
Cassandra Johnson	9	0
Debbie McCormick	8	1
Patti Lank	7	2
Aileen Sormunen	5	4
Amy Wright	5	4
Norma O'Leary	4	5
Caitlin Maroldo	3	6
Lori Karst	2	7
Nancy Richard	1	8
Katie Schmitt	1	8

Tie-breaker

- Sormunen 13-10 Wright

Playoffs

- 3 vs. 4: Lank (3) 9-4 Sormunen (4)
- 1 vs. 2: McCormick (2) 8-6 Johnson (1)
- Semi-final: Johnson 8-7 Lank
- Final: Johnson 5-4 McCormick

==== Men ====
Team	W	L
Pete Fenson	7	2
Craig Brown	6	3
Scott Baird	6	3
Brady Clark	6	3
Rich Ruohonen	5	4
Craig Disher	5	4
Greg Eigner	3	6
Jason Larway	3	6
Ben Tucker	3	6
Wes Johnson	1	8

Tie-breaker

- Brown 9-2 Clark
- Brown 11-8 Baird

Playoffs

- 3 vs. 4: Clark (4) 5-4 Baird (3)
- 1 vs. 2: Fenson (1) 9-3 Brown (2)
- Semi-final: Brown 7-6 Clark
- Final: Fenson 7-3 Brown

=== Japan ===
The Japanese Olympic trials were held November 23, 2005 in Tokoro, Hokkaidō. Two teams, from Nagano (skipped by Yukako Tsuchiya) and Aomori (skipped by Ayumi Onodera) were eligible, with Aomori having the championship team. Therefore, Nagano had to win two games against Aomori to win, while Aomori needed to win either of the games.

==== Women ====
Playoffs

- Game 1: Onodera 5-2 Tsuchiya
- Game 2: Not needed

=== Other nations ===
The teams for most of the other nations were selected by a committee, usually by the governing body of the sport in that nation. The countries qualified based on a point system based on World Championship results. Note that these tables show the results of the Scotland team, at the Olympics, Scotland, as a country of the United Kingdom and a non-sovereign entity, competes under the name "Great Britain". The same point system of 12 points for the winner was used in 2005 World Championships even though the event was expanded to 12 teams from 10.

Men's

Nation	2003	2004	2005	Total
Canada	12	8	12	32.0
Norway	8	7	7	22.0
Scotland	4.5	6	10	20.5
Sweden	6	12	2	20.0
Germany	1.5	10	8	19.5
Switzerland	10	4.5	4	18.5
Finland	7	-	5.5	12.5
United States	3	2	5.5	10.5
New Zealand	-	4.5	3	7.5
Italy (host)	-	-	0	0.0
Denmark	4.5	2	0	6.5
France	-	2	-	2.0
South Korea	1.5	-	-	1.5
Australia	-	-	1	1.0

Women's

Nation	2003	2004	2005	Total
United States	12	7	10	29.0
Canada	10	12	7	29.0
Sweden	8	5	12	25.5
Norway	7	10	8	25.0
Switzerland	6	8	3.5	17.5
Scotland	3	6	5	14.0
Russia	3	-	6	9.0
Japan	3	4	1.5	8.5
Denmark	3	2.5	1.5	7.0
Italy (host)	3	2.5	0	5.5
China	-	-	3.5	3.5
Finland	-	1	0	1.0
