= 2005 Canada Cup of Curling =

2005 Strauss Canada Cup of Curling
- Host city: Kamloops, British Columbia
- Arena: Sport Mart Place
- Dates: March 15-20, 2005
- Attendance: 29,466
- Men's winner: (Alberta) Kevin Martin
- Curling club: Saville Sports Centre, Edmonton
- Skip: Kevin Martin
- Third: Don Walchuk
- Second: Carter Rycroft
- Lead: Don Bartlett
- Finalist: (Alberta) Randy Ferbey
- Women's winner: (Alberta) Shannon Kleibrink
- Curling club: Calgary Winter Club, Calgary
- Skip: Shannon Kleibrink
- Third: Amy Nixon
- Second: Glenys Bakker
- Lead: Christine Keshen
- Finalist: (Saskatchewan) Jan Betker

The 2005 Strauss Canada Cup of Curling was held March 15–20, 2005, at Sport Mart Place in Kamloops, British Columbia. The winning teams received berths into the 2005 Canadian Olympic Curling Trials.

Future Olympic champion Kevin Martin won the men's event, while 2006 Olympic bronze medalist Shannon Kleibrink won the women's event, which aided her path to reach the Olympics. She had already qualified for the Trials, so the runner-up Jan Betker rink earned a berth.

The total purse for the event was $180,000. Martin's team won $37,750, while Team Kleibrink took home $37,250.

While it was the third edition of the Canada Cup, the 2005 event was the first to be a part of Curling Canada's Season of Champions programme.

== Men's event ==
=== Teams ===
Skip	Third	Second	Lead	Locale
Kerry Burtnyk	Ken Tresoor	Rob Fowler	Keith Fenton	(Manitoba) Assiniboine Memorial Curling Club, Winnipeg
Mark Dacey	Bruce Lohnes	Rob Harris	Andrew Gibson	(Nova Scotia) Mayflower Curling Club, Halifax
David Nedohin	Randy Ferbey (skip)	Scott Pfeifer	Marcel Rocque	(Alberta) Granite Curling Club, Edmonton
Brad Gushue	Mark Nichols	Keith Ryan	Jamie Korab	(Newfoundland and Labrador) St. John's Curling Club, St. John's
Mike Harris	John Base	Phil Loevenmark	Trevor Wall	(Ontario) Oakville Curling Club, Oakville
Kevin Martin	Don Walchuk	Carter Rycroft	Don Bartlett	(Alberta) Saville Sports Centre, Edmonton
John Morris	Kevin Koe	Marc Kennedy	Paul Moffatt	(Alberta) Innisfail Curling Club, Innisfail
Jim Cotter	Pat Ryan (skip)	Kevin MacKenzie	Rick Sawatsky	(British Columbia) Kelowna Curling Club, Kelowna
Jeff Stoughton	Jon Mead	Garry VanDenBerghe	Steve Gould	(Manitoba) Charleswood Curling Club, Winnipeg
Wayne Tuck Jr.	Jason Boyce	Matt Paul	Jason Curtis	(Ontario) Brant Curling Club, Brantford

=== Preliminary round ===
Key
Teams to Playoffs
Teams to Tiebreaker

Group A	W	L
(Alberta) Randy Ferbey	4	1
(Manitoba) Jeff Stoughton	4	1
(Ontario) Mike Harris	3	2
(Newfoundland and Labrador) Brad Gushue	1	4
(British Columbia) Pat Ryan	0	5

Group B	W	L
(Alberta) Kevin Martin	5	0
(Manitoba) Kerry Burtnyk	3	2
(Alberta) John Morris	3	2
(Nova Scotia) Mark Dacey	2	3
(Ontario) Wayne Tuck Jr.	0	5

=== Tiebreaker ===
- Burtnyk 7, Morris 6

=== Playoffs ===
Page playoff system
A1	Ferbey	7
B1	Martin	5
A2	Stoughton	7
B2	Burtnyk	5

Semifinal
B1	Martin	8
A2	Stoughton	7

Final
A1	Ferbey	5
B1	Martin	6

== Women's event ==
=== Teams ===
Skip	Third	Second	Lead	Locale
Cheryl Bernard	Susan O'Connor	Jody McNabb	Karen Ruus	(Alberta) Calgary Winter Club, Calgary
Jan Betker	Sherry Linton	Joan McCusker	Marcia Gudereit	(Saskatchewan) Callie Curling Club, Regina
Michelle Englot	Jolene McIvor	Michelle McIvor	Cindy Simmons	(Saskatchewan) Davidson Curling Club, Davidson
Colleen Jones	Kim Kelly	Mary-Anne Arsenault	Nancy Delahunt	(Nova Scotia) Mayflower Curling Club, Halifax
Shannon Kleibrink	Amy Nixon	Glenys Bakker	Christine Keshen	(Alberta) Calgary Winter Club, Calgary
Marie-France Larouche	Karo Gagnon	Annie Lemay	Véronique Grégoire	(Quebec) Club de curling Victoria, Sainte-Foy & Club de curling Etchemin, Saint-Romuald
Anne Merklinger	Theresa Breen	Susan Froud	Audrey Reddick	(Ontario) Rideau Curling Club, Ottawa
Jo-Ann Rizzo	Cheryl McPherson	Kimberly Tuck	Sara Gatchell	(Ontario) Brant Curling Club, Brantford
Kelly Scott	Jeanna Schraeder	Sasha Carter	Renee Simons	(British Columbia) Kelowna Curling Club, Kelowna
Heather Smith-Dacey	Kim Hodson	Laine Peters	Allyson Burgess	(Nova Scotia) Mayflower Curling Club, Halifax

=== Preliminary round ===
Key
Teams to Playoffs
Teams to Tiebreaker

Group A	W	L
(Ontario) Anne Merklinger	4	1
(Alberta) Shannon Kleibrink	3	2
(Nova Scotia) Colleen Jones	3	2
(Nova Scotia) Heather Smith-Dacey	2	3
(Quebec) Marie-France Larouche	1	4

Group B	W	L
(Saskatchewan) Jan Betker	5	0
(Ontario) Jo-Ann Rizzo	4	1
(Saskatchewan) Michelle Englot	2	3
(British Columbia) Kelly Scott	1	4
(Alberta) Cheryl Bernard	0	5

=== Tie breaker ===
- Kleibrink 8, Jones 1

=== Playoffs ===
Page playoff system
A1	Merklinger	7
B1	Betker	8
A2	Kleibrink	9
B2	Rizzo	1

Semifinal
A2	Kleibrink	6
A1	Merklinger	5

Final
A2	Kleibrink	7
B1	Betker	6
