= Michèle Moser =

Swiss curler

Medal record

Representing Switzerland

Women's Curling

Olympic Games
Silver medal – second place	2006 Turin	Team

European Championships
Silver medal – second place	2004 Sofia	
Silver medal – second place	2005 Garmisch-Partenkirchen	

World Junior Championships
Gold medal – first place	1999 Östersund	

Michèle Moser (born 14 February 1979 as Michèle Knobel) is a Swiss curler and Olympic medalist. She received a silver medal at the 2006 Winter Olympics in Turin.
