= Christine Keshen =

Canadian curler

- Curler
- Born: February 6, 1978 (age 48); Invermere, British Columbia

Curling career
- Olympic: 1 (2006)
Medal record
Women's Curling
Representing Canada
Bronze medal – third place	2006 Turin	Team

Christine Keshen (born February 6, 1978) is a Canadian curler from Invermere, British Columbia.

She played lead for Team Canada, skipped by Shannon Kleibrink at the 2006 Winter Olympics. She won the bronze medal in the event. Keshen joined the team in 2005, and helped them win the Canada Cup of Curling in 2005 and the 2005 Canadian Olympic Curling Trials. At the Olympics, Keshen had the best percentage of any female player at the games with 81% after round-robin play.

Keshen posed nude for Ana Arce's "Fire on Ice" 2007 Team Sponsorship Calendar to promote women's curling.
