= Desirée Owen =

Canadian curler

Personal information
- Born: Desirée Robertson; April 24, 1984 (age 42) Grande Prairie, Alberta
Medal record
Women's curling
Representing Alberta
Arctic Winter Games
Gold medal – first place	2000 Whitehorse

Desirée Owen (née Robertson) is a curler from Grande Prairie, Alberta.

== Career ==
Owen won two provincial junior titles- in 2003 and in 2005. At the 2003 Canadian Junior Curling Championships, her Alberta team lost to Saskatchewan's Marliese Kasner (then Miller) in the semi-final.. In 2005, her team posted an undefeated record after the round robin, but ended up losing to New Brunswick's Andrea Kelly in the final.

Owen played third for Crystal Webster until she took the 2009-10 curling season off to have a baby. She did however play for the team as an alternate at the 2009 Canadian Olympic Curling Trials. Owen now skips her own team.

While Owen has never played at the Tournament of Hearts, she has had some success on the Women's World Curling Tour. Her first bonspiel win was the DEKALB Superspiel in 2009 with Webster. She has made it to two Grand Slam finals. In 2006, she lost to Kelly Scott at the 2006 Trail Appliances Autumn Gold Curling Classic. She made it to the final at the same event in 2010 as a skip, but lost again, this time to China's Wang Bingyu.
