= Carolyn McRorie =

Canadian curler

- Curler
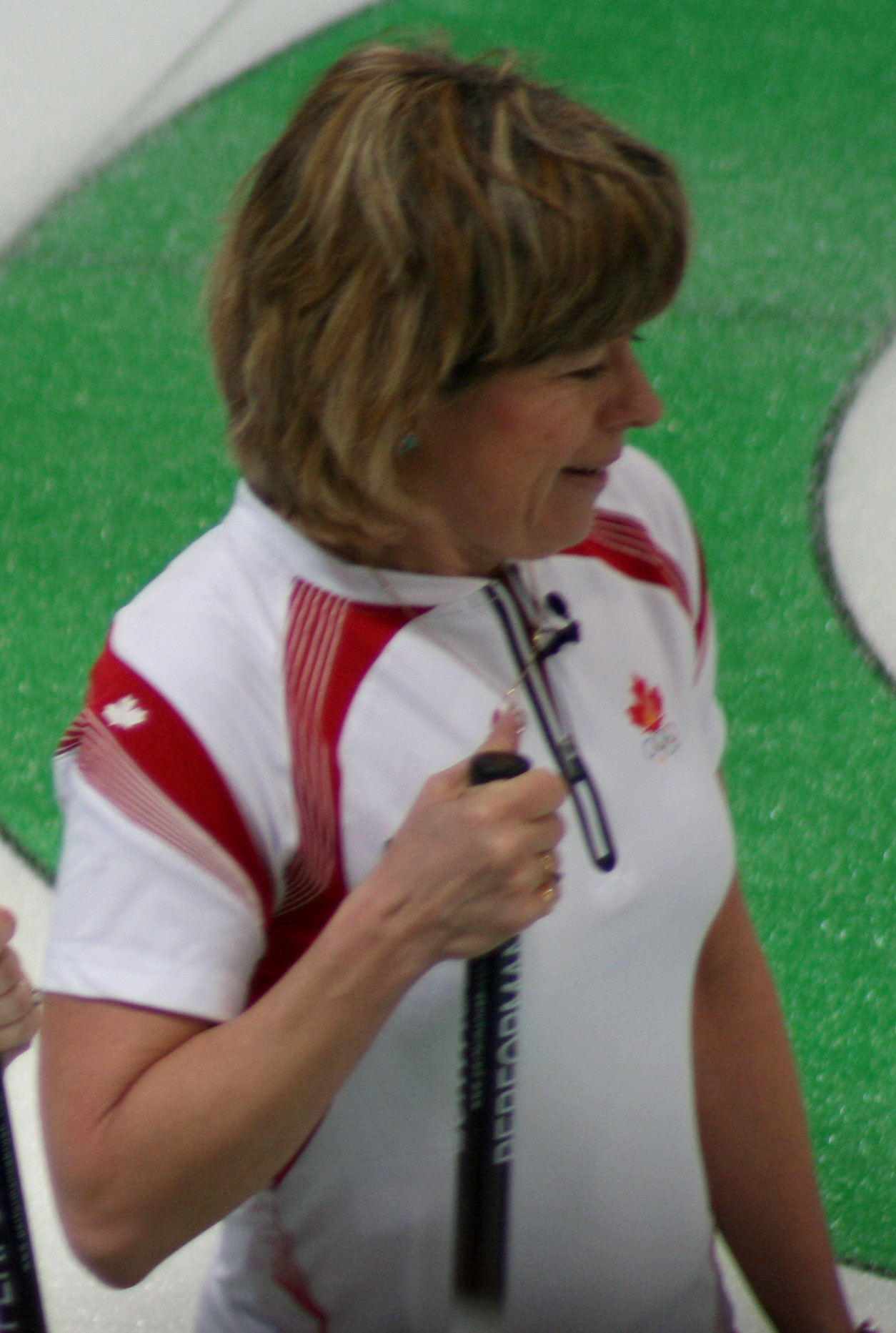
- Born: Carolyn Darbyshire; December 6, 1963 (age 62); Arborg, Manitoba, Canada

Team
- Curling club: Calgary CC, Calgary, Alberta
- Skip: Cheryl Bernard
- Third: Carolyn McRorie
- Second: Laine Peters
- Lead: Karen Ruus

Curling career
- Hearts: 3 (1985, 2007, 2009)
- Top CTRS ranking: 4th (2006–07, 2007–08, 2008–09)
- Grand Slam victories: 1 (Players': 2010)
Medal record
Curling
Representing Canada
Winter Olympics
Silver medal – second place	2010 Vancouver
Canadian Olympic Curling Trials
Gold medal – first place	2009 Edmonton

Carolyn Darbyshire-McRorie (born December 6, 1963) is a Canadian curler from Calgary, Alberta. She played second for Cheryl Bernard from 2005–2011, winning the silver medal in 2010 Winter Olympics. She is currently the coach of the New Zealand national men's team, skipped by Anton Hood. She also coaches the Bayly Scoffin rink.

== Career ==
Darbyshire-McRorie joined Bernard's team in 2005 after playing for Renelle Bryden. She has since won two provincial championships as a member of the team (2007 and 2009).

Darbyshire-McRorie played third for Heather Fowlie (Rankin) at the 2001 Canadian Olympic Curling Trials, and finished with a 4–5 record. As a member of team Bernard, Darbyshire-McRorie once again made it to the trials in 2009.

McRorie is known for her distinctive "Manitoba tuck" delivery while using a corn broom while delivering the rock.

On February 8, 2011, it was announced that the Bernard team would disband at the end of the 2010–2011 season. Carolyn has formed a team for the 2011/2012 season, She will skip the team with Marcy Balderston at third, Raylene Rocque, who previously played for Cathy King and retired at the end of the 2009–2010 season, will join the team at the second position and Karen McNamee playing lead. She will also play alternate for Bernard when appropriate.

Although Darbyshire-McRorie has created a team for the 2011–12 season, she will be playing second stones for Shannon Kleibrink as of December 2011. The announcement was made during the 2011 Canada Cup of Curling. She will replace Bronwen Webster who is expecting her first child, and has decided to sit out the rest of the season.

== Personal life ==
McRorie currently owns Canadian Decal Installers. She is married, has a daughter and a stepson. She is of Métis heritage.

== Record as a coach of national teams ==
Year	Tournament, event	National team	Place
2018	2018–19 Curling World Cup – First Leg	China (women)	7
2018	2018 Pacific-Asia Curling Championships	China (women)	3rd place, bronze medalist(s)
2019	2018–19 Curling World Cup – Third Leg	China (women)	4
2019	2018–19 Curling World Cup grand final	China (women)	5
