= Bronwen Webster =

Canadian curler

- Curler
- Born: Bronwen Saunders; August 2, 1978 (age 48); Calgary, Alberta

Team
- Curling club: Calgary WC, Calgary

Curling career
- Hearts: 2 (2008, 2011)
- Grand Slam victories: 2 (Autumn Gold, 2008; Casinos of Winnipeg, 2007
Medal record
Women's curling
Representing Alberta
Scotties Tournament of Hearts
Silver medal – second place	2008 Regina
Canadian Olympic Curling Trials
Silver medal – second place	2009 Edmonton

Bronwen Webster (born Bronwen Saunders; August 2, 1978) is a Canadian curler from Alberta.

== Career ==
Webster won her provincial junior championship earning her a right to represent Alberta at the 1998 Canadian Junior Curling Championships. Her team finished with a 5-7 record.

After playing with Heather Rankin at the 2001 Olympic Trials, Webster would skip her own team again and play with Crystal Rumberg and participate in numerous Alberta Provincial Championships.

Webster joined the Olympic bronze-medalist Shannon Kleibrink rink in 2006 as the second on the team. Webster won her first provincial title as a member of the Kleibrink team in 2008.

She married Kevin Webster in August 2008.

At the 2011 Canada Cup of Curling, it was announced that Webster, who is expecting her first child, will sit out for the rest of the season following the event. She was replaced by Carolyn McRorie, who had previously filled in for Shannon Kleibrink at the beginning of the season, and Chelsea Matson who did not participate in the Canada Cup event.

Webster left the team in 2014.
