= Glenys Bakker =

Canadian curler (born 1962)

Olympic medal record

Women's Curling
| Bronze medal – third place | 2006 Turin | Curling |

Glenys Bakker (born August 27, 1962, in High River, Alberta) is a Canadian curler from Calgary, Alberta.

Bakker played second for Shannon Kleibrink's bronze medal-winning team at the 2006 Winter Olympics.

Bakker played for Shannon Kleibrink for most of her curling career. At the 1993 Scott Tournament of Hearts, Bakker was Kleibrink's Alternate. She was Kleibrink's third at the 1997 Canadian Olympic Trials where the team lost to Sandra Schmirler in the final. In 2004, she was Kleibrink's second at the 2004 Scott Tournament of Hearts where they finished with a 6–5 record. Also as Kleibrink's second, the team won the 2005 Canada Cup of Curling and won the 2005 Canadian Olympic Curling Trials getting a berth at the 2006 Olympics.

At the Olympics, Bakker struggled for most of tournament, and was the 8th best second at the games out of ten second's. She blamed her performance on her thyroid gland which had shut down.

In 2006, Bakker left Kleibrink's team, citing wanting to focus more on her family. After recovering from her health issues, Bakker formed a new team for the 2006–07 curling season with Allison Earl, Shannon Nimmo and Barb Davies.
