= Chelsey Matson =

Canadian curler

- Curler
- Born: September 1, 1982 (age 44); Regina, Saskatchewan, Canada

Curling career
- Hearts: 3 (2005, 2008, 2011)
- Grand Slam victories: 3 (Casinos of Winnipeg, 2007; Wayden Transportation Ladies Classic, 2006; Autumn Gold, 2008)
Medal record
Curling
World Junior Championships
Gold medal – first place	2003 Flims
Scotties Tournament of Hearts
Silver medal – second place	2008 Regina
Canadian Olympic Curling Trials
Silver medal – second place	2009 Edmonton
Bronze medal – third place	2005 Halifax

Chelsey Matson (née Bell) (born September 1, 1982) is a Canadian curler.

== Career ==
Matson was the long-time lead for Stefanie Lawton. She played for her at the 2001 Canadian Junior Curling Championships and at the 2005 Scott Tournament of Hearts. However, it was in 2003 when playing lead for Lawton's sister, Marliese Kasner that she won the Canadian and World Junior Curling Championships. She was named the all-star lead at the World Juniors that year.

Matson left the Lawton team in 2007 to play with Kleibrink. With Kleibrink, Bell has shared several successes, including winning the Casinos of Winnipeg Grand Slam in October 2007 and the 2008 Alberta Provincial Championship in January 2008.

== Personal life ==
Matson was born in Regina, Saskatchewan. Matson married in the summer of 2011.
