= 2025 Oslo Cup =

- Host city: Oslo, Norway
- Arena: Snarøya Curling Club
- Dates: August 28–31
- Men's winner: (United States) Team Shuster
- Curling club: Duluth CC, Duluth
- Skip: Chris Plys
- Third: Matt Hamilton
- Lead: Colin Hufman
- Coach: Theran Michaelis
- Finalist: (Sweden) Niklas Edin
- Women's winner: (Switzerland) Team Schwaller
- Curling club: GC Zurich, Zurich
- Skip: Xenia Schwaller
- Third: Selina Gafner
- Second: Fabienne Rieder
- Lead: Selina Rychiger
- Coach: Andreas Schwaller
- Finalist: (Norway) Torild Bjørnstad

The 2025 Oslo Cup was held from August 28 to 31 at the Snarøya Curling Club in Oslo, Norway. The event was held in a round robin format with a purse of NOK 112,000 on the men's side and NOK 78,000 on the women's side. It was the first event of the 2025–26 Nordic Curling Tour.

On the men's side, the John Shuster rink, skipped by Chris Plys and playing as three, won the United States' first Oslo Cup title, defeating Sweden's Niklas Edin 7–2 in a rematch of the 2018 Olympic final. Plys, with teammates Matt Hamilton and Colin Hufman, finished 4–1 through the round robin. They then beat Andreas Hårstad in the quarterfinals and Jan Iseli in the semifinal to qualify for the championship game. Conversely, Team Edin earned the eighth playoff seed with a 3–2 record before knocking off previously undefeated Cameron Bryce in the quarters and Mathias Genner in a semifinal rematch from the round robin. Yves Stocker and Orrin Carson rounded out the playoff field.

In the women's event, Xenia Schwaller's Swiss rink won 7–2 over Norway's Torild Bjørnstad in a battle of previously undefeated teams. Both teams earned a bye to the semifinals following 4–0 round robin records where they beat Dilşat Yıldız and Team Constantini respectively. Yıldız advanced to the semis with a 4–2 win over Moa Dryburgh in the quarterfinals while Constantini stole in an extra end to eliminate Marianne Rørvik.

== Men ==
=== Teams ===
The teams are listed as follows:

Skip	Third	Second	Lead	Alternate	Locale
Kjetil Bjørke	Herman Suther	Lasse Vinje	Håvard Lundhaug		Bygdøy, Norway
Cameron Bryce	Duncan Menzies	Scott Hyslop	Robin McCall		Kelso, Scotland
Grunde Buraas	Magnus Nedregotten	Magnus Lillebø	Harald Dæhlin		Lillehammer, Norway
Orrin Carson	Logan Carson	Archie Hyslop	Charlie Gibb		Dumfries, Scotland
James Craik	Fraser Swanston	Jake MacDonald	Rory Macnair		Forfar, Scotland
Niklas Edin	Oskar Eriksson	Rasmus Wranå	Christoffer Sundgren		Karlstad, Sweden
Mathias Genner	Jonas Backofen	Martin Reichel	Florian Mavec	Johann Karg	Kitzbühel, Austria
Andreas Hårstad	Willhelm Næss	Michael Mellemseter	Mathias Brænden		Oppdal, Norway
Max Winz (Fourth)	Jan Iseli (Skip)	Sandro Fanchini	Tom Winkelhausen		Solothurn, Switzerland
Lukáš Klíma	Marek Černovský	Martin Jurík	Lukáš Klípa	Radek Boháč	Prague, Czech Republic
Axel Landelius	Alexander Palm	Johan Engqvist	Alfons Johansson		Mjölby, Sweden
Markus Dale (Fourth)	Anders Mjøen (Skip)	Emil Sæther	Erland Loe		Oppdal, Norway
Fredrik Nyman	Patric Mabergs	Simon Olofsson	Johannes Patz		Sollefteå, Sweden
Magnus Ramsfjell	Martin Sesaker	Bendik Ramsfjell	Gaute Nepstad		Trondheim, Norway
Jonathan Vilandt (Fourth)	Jacob Schmidt (Skip)	Alexander Qvist	Kasper Jurlander Bøge	Mads Nørgaard	Hvidovre, Denmark
Chris Plys	Matt Hamilton	– (Note: Team Shuster played with three players. Chris Plys moved up to skip.)	Colin Hufman		(United States) Duluth, Minnesota
Yves Stocker	Kim Schwaller	Marco Hefti	Felix Eberhard		Zug, Switzerland
Sondre Svorkmo-Lundberg	Sigurd Svorkmo-Lundberg	Torstein Hoiholt-Vagsnes	Oscar Nydahl		Oppdal, Norway

=== Round robin standings ===
Final Round Robin Standings

Key
Teams to Playoffs

Pool A	W	L	PF	PA	DSC
(Scotland) Orrin Carson	4	1	31	22	4.33
(United States) Team Shuster	4	1	27	11	15.75
(Norway) Grunde Buraas	3	2	24	22	38.68
(Czech Republic) Lukáš Klíma	2	3	27	28	28.55
(Norway) Anders Mjøen	1	4	20	33	61.38
(Scotland) James Craik	1	4	17	30	10.75

Pool B	W	L	PF	PA	DSC
(Scotland) Cameron Bryce	5	0	32	19	29.00
(Switzerland) Yves Stocker	4	1	26	20	9.15
(Norway) Magnus Ramsfjell	3	2	31	17	5.88
(Sweden) Fredrik Nyman	2	3	26	26	30.78
(Denmark) Jacob Schmidt	1	4	21	27	18.15
(Norway) Sondre Svorkmo-Lundberg	0	5	14	41	60.53

Pool C	W	L	PF	PA	DSC
(Austria) Mathias Genner	4	1	27	21	28.78
(Norway) Andreas Hårstad	4	1	34	19	24.33
(Sweden) Niklas Edin	3	2	33	21	5.00
(Switzerland) Jan Iseli	3	2	24	15	2.35
(Sweden) Axel Landelius	1	4	24	33	2.30
(Norway) Kjetil Bjørke	0	5	12	45	53.85

=== Round robin results ===
All draw times are listed in Central European Summer Time (UTC+02:00).

==== Draw 1 ====
Thursday, August 28, 11:30 am

Sheet A	1	2	3	4	5	6	7	8	Final
(Norway) Anders Mjøen 🔨	0	3	0	2	0	0	1	0	6
(Scotland) Orrin Carson	1	0	2	0	2	1	0	2	8

Sheet B	1	2	3	4	5	6	7	8	Final
(United States) Team Shuster	0	2	3	0	2	1	X	X	8
(Scotland) James Craik 🔨	1	0	0	1	0	0	X	X	2

Sheet C	1	2	3	4	5	6	7	8	Final
(Czech Republic) Lukáš Klíma 🔨	2	3	0	0	2	1	0	X	8
(Norway) Grunde Buraas	0	0	1	3	0	0	1	X	5

Sheet D	1	2	3	4	5	6	7	8	Final
(Norway) Sondre Svorkmo-Lundberg	0	0	1	0	0	1	X	X	2
(Switzerland) Yves Stocker 🔨	4	1	0	0	1	0	X	X	6

==== Draw 2 ====
Thursday, August 28, 2:30 pm

Sheet A	1	2	3	4	5	6	7	8	Final
(Norway) Magnus Ramsfjell 🔨	1	3	2	0	0	3	X	X	9
(Denmark) Jacob Schmidt	0	0	0	1	1	0	X	X	2

Sheet B	1	2	3	4	5	6	7	8	Final
(Scotland) Cameron Bryce	0	0	0	2	0	3	0	X	5
(Sweden) Fredrik Nyman 🔨	0	0	1	0	1	0	0	X	2

Sheet C	1	2	3	4	5	6	7	8	Final
(Sweden) Axel Landelius	0	0	0	1	0	0	1	X	2
(Switzerland) Jan Iseli 🔨	0	1	3	0	2	0	0	X	6

Sheet D	1	2	3	4	5	6	7	8	Final
(Sweden) Niklas Edin 🔨	2	0	3	2	0	4	X	X	11
(Norway) Kjetil Bjørke	0	1	0	0	1	0	X	X	2

==== Draw 4 ====
Thursday, August 28, 6:00 pm

Sheet E	1	2	3	4	5	6	7	8	Final
(Norway) Andreas Hårstad	0	2	0	1	0	1	0	0	4
(Austria) Mathias Genner 🔨	1	0	0	0	1	0	2	1	5

Sheet F	1	2	3	4	5	6	7	8	Final
(Norway) Grunde Buraas 🔨	0	3	2	1	X	X	X	X	6
(Norway) Anders Mjøen	1	0	0	0	X	X	X	X	1

==== Draw 5 ====
Thursday, August 28, 8:30 pm

Sheet A	1	2	3	4	5	6	7	8	Final
(Sweden) Fredrik Nyman 🔨	1	0	4	0	1	3	X	X	9
(Norway) Sondre Svorkmo-Lundberg	0	2	0	0	0	0	X	X	2

Sheet B	1	2	3	4	5	6	7	8	Final
(Denmark) Jacob Schmidt	0	1	0	1	0	0	0	0	2
(Switzerland) Yves Stocker 🔨	2	0	1	0	0	0	0	1	4

Sheet C	1	2	3	4	5	6	7	8	Final
(Scotland) Cameron Bryce 🔨	0	1	0	0	1	0	1	2	5
(Norway) Magnus Ramsfjell	0	0	1	0	0	1	0	0	2

Sheet D	1	2	3	4	5	6	7	8	Final
(Czech Republic) Lukáš Klíma	0	1	0	0	0	1	0	0	2
(United States) Team Shuster 🔨	0	0	2	0	0	0	0	1	3

==== Draw 6 ====
Thursday, August 28, 9:00 pm

Sheet E	1	2	3	4	5	6	7	8	Final
(Scotland) James Craik	0	0	0	1	0	0	X	X	1
(Scotland) Orrin Carson 🔨	0	1	0	0	4	1	X	X	6

Sheet F	1	2	3	4	5	6	7	8	Final
(Austria) Mathias Genner	0	3	0	3	0	1	1	X	8
(Sweden) Axel Landelius 🔨	2	0	1	0	1	0	0	X	4

==== Draw 8 ====
Friday, August 29, 9:30 am

Sheet E	1	2	3	4	5	6	7	8	Final
(Norway) Kjetil Bjørke	0	0	1	0	1	X	X	X	2
(Switzerland) Jan Iseli 🔨	3	2	0	2	0	X	X	X	7

Sheet F	1	2	3	4	5	6	7	8	Final
(Norway) Andreas Hårstad	0	1	1	0	0	2	0	3	7
(Sweden) Niklas Edin 🔨	2	0	0	1	0	0	2	0	5

==== Draw 9 ====
Friday, August 29, 11:30 am

Sheet A	1	2	3	4	5	6	7	8	Final
(Norway) Anders Mjøen	0	1	0	2	1	0	1	2	7
(Scotland) James Craik 🔨	3	0	1	0	0	1	0	0	5

Sheet B	1	2	3	4	5	6	7	8	Final
(Norway) Magnus Ramsfjell	0	2	0	4	1	X	X	X	7
(Sweden) Fredrik Nyman 🔨	0	0	1	0	0	X	X	X	1

Sheet C	1	2	3	4	5	6	7	8	Final
(Switzerland) Yves Stocker 🔨	0	2	0	2	0	0	0	0	4
(Scotland) Cameron Bryce	0	0	0	0	2	2	1	1	6

Sheet D	1	2	3	4	5	6	7	8	Final
(Norway) Sondre Svorkmo-Lundberg 🔨	0	0	0	0	0	X	X	X	0
(Denmark) Jacob Schmidt	2	1	2	2	0	X	X	X	7

==== Draw 10 ====
Friday, August 29, 12:30 pm

Sheet E	1	2	3	4	5	6	7	8	Final
(United States) Team Shuster	1	2	1	0	3	X	X	X	7
(Norway) Grunde Buraas 🔨	0	0	0	1	0	X	X	X	1

Sheet F	1	2	3	4	5	6	7	8	Final
(Scotland) Orrin Carson 🔨	2	0	1	2	0	2	0	1	8
(Czech Republic) Lukáš Klíma	0	2	0	0	2	0	2	0	6

==== Draw 12 ====
Friday, August 29, 3:30 pm

Sheet E	1	2	3	4	5	6	7	8	Final
(Sweden) Niklas Edin 🔨	0	2	0	2	0	1	0	0	5
(Austria) Mathias Genner	1	0	3	0	1	0	0	1	6

Sheet F	1	2	3	4	5	6	7	8	Final
(Sweden) Axel Landelius 🔨	1	0	2	1	0	4	2	X	10
(Norway) Kjetil Bjørke	0	2	0	0	2	0	0	X	4

==== Draw 13 ====
Friday, August 29, 5:30 pm

Sheet A	1	2	3	4	5	6	7	8	9	Final
(Norway) Grunde Buraas	0	0	2	0	0	2	0	1	1	6
(Scotland) Orrin Carson 🔨	0	2	0	1	0	0	2	0	0	5

Sheet B	1	2	3	4	5	6	7	8	Final
(Czech Republic) Lukáš Klíma 🔨	1	0	1	0	1	X	X	X	3
(Scotland) James Craik	0	3	0	5	0	X	X	X	8

Sheet C	1	2	3	4	5	6	7	8	Final
(Norway) Magnus Ramsfjell 🔨	3	0	0	1	0	4	1	X	9
(Norway) Sondre Svorkmo-Lundberg	0	2	1	0	1	0	0	X	4

Sheet D	1	2	3	4	5	6	7	8	Final
(Switzerland) Jan Iseli	0	1	1	0	0	0	1	0	3
(Norway) Andreas Hårstad 🔨	2	0	0	1	1	0	0	1	5

==== Draw 14 ====
Friday, August 29, 6:00 pm

Sheet E	1	2	3	4	5	6	7	8	9	Final
(Sweden) Fredrik Nyman	0	3	0	2	0	0	0	1	0	6
(Switzerland) Yves Stocker 🔨	1	0	1	0	3	1	0	0	1	7

Sheet F	1	2	3	4	5	6	7	8	Final
(United States) Team Shuster 🔨	3	3	0	0	X	X	X	X	6
(Norway) Anders Mjøen	0	0	1	1	X	X	X	X	2

==== Draw 15 ====
Friday, August 29, 8:30 pm

Sheet A	1	2	3	4	5	6	7	8	9	Final
(Scotland) Cameron Bryce 🔨	2	0	2	1	0	0	0	0	1	6
(Denmark) Jacob Schmidt	0	1	0	0	1	1	1	1	0	5

==== Draw 16 ====
Saturday, August 30, 9:00 am

Sheet A	1	2	3	4	5	6	7	8	Final
(Sweden) Niklas Edin	0	3	1	0	0	3	0	X	7
(Sweden) Axel Landelius 🔨	1	0	0	1	0	0	2	X	4

Sheet B	1	2	3	4	5	6	7	8	Final
(Austria) Mathias Genner 🔨	0	0	1	0	0	0	X	X	1
(Switzerland) Jan Iseli	1	3	0	0	0	2	X	X	6

Sheet C	1	2	3	4	5	6	7	8	Final
(Norway) Andreas Hårstad	0	3	0	5	2	X	X	X	10
(Norway) Kjetil Bjørke 🔨	1	0	1	0	0	X	X	X	2

Sheet D	1	2	3	4	5	6	7	8	Final
(Scotland) Orrin Carson	0	0	0	1	0	0	2	1	4
(United States) Team Shuster 🔨	0	0	1	0	0	2	0	0	3

==== Draw 17 ====
Saturday, August 30, 9:30 am

Sheet E	1	2	3	4	5	6	7	8	Final
(Norway) Anders Mjøen	0	2	1	0	1	0	X	X	4
(Czech Republic) Lukáš Klíma 🔨	2	0	0	2	0	4	X	X	8

Sheet F	1	2	3	4	5	6	7	8	Final
(Scotland) James Craik 🔨	0	1	0	0	0	0	X	X	1
(Norway) Grunde Buraas	0	0	3	2	0	1	X	X	6

==== Draw 19 ====
Saturday, August 30, 1:00 pm

Sheet E	1	2	3	4	5	6	7	8	Final
(Norway) Sondre Svorkmo-Lundberg 🔨	3	1	0	1	0	0	1	0	6
(Scotland) Cameron Bryce	0	0	3	0	2	1	0	4	10

Sheet F	1	2	3	4	5	6	7	8	Final
(Denmark) Jacob Schmidt	0	0	0	2	0	3	0	0	5
(Sweden) Fredrik Nyman 🔨	0	3	0	0	4	0	0	1	8

==== Draw 20 ====
Saturday, August 30, 3:30 pm

Sheet A	1	2	3	4	5	6	7	8	9	Final
(Switzerland) Yves Stocker 🔨	0	1	0	1	0	0	2	0	1	5
(Norway) Magnus Ramsfjell	1	0	1	0	1	0	0	1	0	4

Sheet B	1	2	3	4	5	6	7	8	9	Final
(Sweden) Axel Landelius 🔨	1	0	1	0	1	0	0	1	0	4
(Norway) Andreas Hårstad	0	1	0	2	0	1	0	0	4	8

Sheet C	1	2	3	4	5	6	7	8	Final
(Norway) Kjetil Bjørke 🔨	0	2	0	0	0	0	0	0	2
(Austria) Mathias Genner	0	0	0	1	1	3	0	2	7

Sheet D	1	2	3	4	5	6	7	8	Final
(Switzerland) Jan Iseli 🔨	1	0	0	0	0	1	0	X	2
(Sweden) Niklas Edin	0	1	0	0	1	0	3	X	5

=== Playoffs ===
Quarterfinals
1	(Scotland) Cameron Bryce	3
8	(Sweden) Niklas Edin	8
4	(United States) Team Shuster	7
5	(Norway) Andreas Hårstad	6
2	(Scotland) Orrin Carson	5
7	(Switzerland) Jan Iseli	6
3	(Switzerland) Yves Stocker	2
6	(Austria) Mathias Genner	5

Semifinals
4	(United States) Team Shuster	7
7	(Switzerland) Jan Iseli	4
6	(Austria) Mathias Genner	2
8	(Sweden) Niklas Edin	4

Final
4	(United States) Team Shuster	7
8	(Sweden) Niklas Edin	2

==== Quarterfinals ====
Sunday, August 31, 9:00 am

Sheet A	1	2	3	4	5	6	7	8	Final
(United States) Team Shuster 🔨	3	0	1	0	1	0	2	0	7
(Norway) Andreas Hårstad	0	2	0	2	0	1	0	1	6

Sheet B	1	2	3	4	5	6	7	8	Final
(Switzerland) Yves Stocker 🔨	1	0	1	0	0	0	0	X	2
(Austria) Mathias Genner	0	1	0	2	0	1	1	X	5

Sheet C	1	2	3	4	5	6	7	8	Final
(Scotland) Orrin Carson 🔨	0	0	1	0	1	0	3	0	5
(Switzerland) Jan Iseli	0	0	0	3	0	2	0	1	6

Sheet D	1	2	3	4	5	6	7	8	Final
(Scotland) Cameron Bryce 🔨	1	0	0	2	0	0	X	X	3
(Sweden) Niklas Edin	0	2	3	0	0	3	X	X	8

==== Semifinals ====
Sunday, August 31, 12:00 pm

Sheet B	1	2	3	4	5	6	7	8	Final
(United States) Team Shuster 🔨	2	0	1	0	1	0	3	X	7
(Switzerland) Jan Iseli	0	1	0	1	0	2	0	X	4

Sheet C	1	2	3	4	5	6	7	8	Final
(Austria) Mathias Genner 🔨	1	0	0	0	0	0	1	X	2
(Sweden) Niklas Edin	0	2	0	0	1	1	0	X	4

==== Final ====
Sunday, August 31, 2:30 pm

Sheet B	1	2	3	4	5	6	7	8	Final
(United States) Team Shuster 🔨	2	0	0	2	2	1	X	X	7
(Sweden) Niklas Edin	0	0	2	0	0	0	X	X	2

== Women ==
=== Teams ===
The teams are listed as follows:

Skip	Third	Second	Lead	Alternate	Locale
Torild Bjørnstad	Nora Østgård	Ingeborg Forbregd	Eirin Mesloe		Oppdal, Norway
Giulia Zardini Lacedelli	Elena Mathis	Lucrezia Grande (Note: Lucrezia Grande and Rebecca Mariani spared for Stefania Constantini and Angela Romei. They played second and alternate respectively, while Giulia Zardini Lacedelli moved to skip and Elena Mathis played third.)	Marta Lo Deserto	Rebecca Mariani	Cortina d'Ampezzo, Italy
Moa Dryburgh	Thea Orefjord	Moa Tjärnlund	Maja Roxin		Sundbyberg, Sweden
Corrie Hürlimann	Marina Lörtscher	Stefanie Berset	Celine Schwizgebel		Zug, Switzerland
Michaela Baudyšová (Note: Karolína Špundová and Ežen Kolčevská spared for Anna Kubešková and Alžběta Zelingrová. They played third and lead respectively while Michaela Baudyšová moved to skip.)	Karolína Špundová	Aneta Müllerová	Ežen Kolčevská		Prague, Czech Republic
Verena Pflügler	Hannah Augustin	Johanna Höss	Teresa Treichl		Kitzbühel, Austria
Kristin Skaslien (Fourth)	Marianne Rørvik (Skip)	Mille Haslev Nordbye	Eilin Kjærland		Lillehammer, Norway
Xenia Schwaller	Selina Gafner	Fabienne Rieder	Selina Rychiger		Zurich, Switzerland
Liisa Turmann	Kerli Laidsalu	Erika Tuvike	Heili Grossmann		Tallinn, Estonia
Dilşat Yıldız	Öznur Polat	İclal Karaman	Berfin Şengül	İfayet Şafak Çalıkuşu	Erzurum, Turkey

=== Round robin standings ===
Final Round Robin Standings

Key
Teams to Playoffs

Pool A	W	L	PF	PA	DSC
(Switzerland) Xenia Schwaller	4	0	27	12	15.83
(Sweden) Moa Dryburgh	2	2	22	17	22.37
(Norway) Marianne Rørvik	2	2	16	22	54.30
(Estonia) Liisa Turmann	2	2	21	22	57.83
(Austria) Verena Pflügler	0	4	12	25	26.43

Pool B	W	L	PF	PA	DSC
(Norway) Torild Bjørnstad	4	0	29	14	16.30
(Italy) Team Constantini	3	1	22	17	0.00
(Turkey) Dilşat Yıldız	2	2	21	15	45.00
(Switzerland) Corrie Hürlimann	1	3	22	26	10.77
(Czech Republic) Team Kubešková	0	4	14	36	96.07

=== Round robin results ===
All draw times are listed in Central European Summer Time (UTC+02:00).

==== Draw 3 ====
Thursday, August 28, 5:30 pm

Sheet A	1	2	3	4	5	6	7	8	9	Final
(Sweden) Moa Dryburgh 🔨	1	0	1	0	1	0	1	1	0	5
(Estonia) Liisa Turmann	0	0	0	3	0	2	0	0	4	9

Sheet B	1	2	3	4	5	6	7	8	Final
(Italy) Team Constantini	0	1	0	0	1	0	1	X	3
(Norway) Torild Bjørnstad 🔨	2	0	1	1	0	3	0	X	7

Sheet C	1	2	3	4	5	6	7	8	Final
(Turkey) Dilşat Yıldız 🔨	0	2	1	1	0	3	0	X	7
(Czech Republic) Team Kubešková	0	0	0	0	1	0	1	X	2

Sheet D	1	2	3	4	5	6	7	8	Final
(Switzerland) Xenia Schwaller 🔨	0	1	1	0	2	0	3	X	7
(Norway) Marianne Rørvik	0	0	0	1	0	1	0	X	2

==== Draw 7 ====
Friday, August 29, 9:00 am

Sheet A	1	2	3	4	5	6	7	8	Final
(Austria) Verena Pflügler 🔨	0	0	0	0	1	0	1	X	2
(Switzerland) Xenia Schwaller	1	2	0	1	0	2	0	X	6

Sheet B	1	2	3	4	5	6	7	8	Final
(Norway) Marianne Rørvik	0	0	0	0	0	0	X	X	0
(Sweden) Moa Dryburgh 🔨	0	2	1	1	2	1	X	X	7

Sheet C	1	2	3	4	5	6	7	8	Final
(Switzerland) Corrie Hürlimann	0	0	1	0	2	1	0	X	4
(Italy) Team Constantini 🔨	0	2	0	3	0	0	3	X	8

Sheet D	1	2	3	4	5	6	7	8	Final
(Norway) Torild Bjørnstad 🔨	2	1	0	0	2	0	2	X	7
(Turkey) Dilşat Yıldız	0	0	1	1	0	1	0	X	3

==== Draw 11 ====
Friday, August 29, 2:30 pm

Sheet A	1	2	3	4	5	6	7	8	Final
(Czech Republic) Team Kubešková 🔨	0	0	2	0	2	0	0	X	4
(Switzerland) Corrie Hürlimann	3	2	0	3	0	2	4	X	14

Sheet B	1	2	3	4	5	6	7	8	Final
(Estonia) Liisa Turmann 🔨	2	0	1	1	0	2	0	X	6
(Austria) Verena Pflügler	0	0	0	0	2	0	1	X	3

Sheet C	1	2	3	4	5	6	7	8	Final
(Sweden) Moa Dryburgh	0	0	0	1	0	1	2	0	4
(Switzerland) Xenia Schwaller 🔨	4	0	1	0	1	0	0	1	7

Sheet D	1	2	3	4	5	6	7	8	Final
(Turkey) Dilşat Yıldız 🔨	0	0	2	0	1	0	0	0	3
(Italy) Team Constantini	0	1	0	1	0	1	0	2	5

==== Draw 15 ====
Friday, August 29, 8:30 pm

Sheet B	1	2	3	4	5	6	7	8	Final
(Norway) Marianne Rørvik 🔨	2	0	0	0	2	2	0	1	7
(Austria) Verena Pflügler	0	2	2	1	0	0	1	0	6

Sheet C	1	2	3	4	5	6	7	8	Final
(Norway) Torild Bjørnstad	2	0	1	0	2	0	1	X	6
(Switzerland) Corrie Hürlimann 🔨	0	1	0	1	0	1	0	X	3

==== Draw 18 ====
Saturday, August 30, 12:00 pm

Sheet A	1	2	3	4	5	6	7	8	Final
(Switzerland) Corrie Hürlimann 🔨	0	0	0	1	0	0	0	X	1
(Turkey) Dilşat Yıldız	2	1	2	0	1	1	1	X	8

Sheet B	1	2	3	4	5	6	7	8	Final
(Austria) Verena Pflügler	0	0	0	0	1	0	X	X	1
(Sweden) Moa Dryburgh 🔨	0	2	2	1	0	1	X	X	6

Sheet C	1	2	3	4	5	6	7	8	Final
(Czech Republic) Team Kubešková 🔨	0	1	0	2	1	0	1	X	5
(Norway) Torild Bjørnstad	1	0	7	0	0	1	0	X	9

Sheet D	1	2	3	4	5	6	7	8	Final
(Estonia) Liisa Turmann	0	0	0	1	0	1	X	X	2
(Norway) Marianne Rørvik 🔨	0	3	1	0	3	0	X	X	7

==== Draw 21 ====
Saturday, August 30, 4:30 pm

Sheet E	1	2	3	4	5	6	7	8	Final
(Switzerland) Xenia Schwaller	0	0	1	0	2	3	1	X	7
(Estonia) Liisa Turmann 🔨	1	1	0	2	0	0	0	X	4

Sheet F	1	2	3	4	5	6	7	8	Final
(Italy) Team Constantini 🔨	0	2	1	1	0	2	0	X	6
(Czech Republic) Team Kubešková	0	0	0	0	2	0	1	X	3

=== Playoffs ===
Quarterfinals
4	(Sweden) Moa Dryburgh	2
5	(Turkey) Dilşat Yıldız	4
3	(Italy) Team Constantini	7
6	(Norway) Marianne Rørvik	6

Semifinals
1	(Switzerland) Xenia Schwaller	5
5	(Turkey) Dilşat Yıldız	1
2	(Norway) Torild Bjørnstad	7
3	(Italy) Team Constantini	5

Final
1	(Switzerland) Xenia Schwaller	7
2	(Norway) Torild Bjørnstad	2

==== Quarterfinals ====
Sunday, August 31, 9:00 am

Sheet E	1	2	3	4	5	6	7	8	9	Final
(Italy) Team Constantini 🔨	1	0	0	2	2	0	0	1	1	7
(Norway) Marianne Rørvik	0	1	2	0	0	3	0	0	0	6

Sheet F	1	2	3	4	5	6	7	8	Final
(Sweden) Moa Dryburgh 🔨	1	0	0	0	1	0	0	X	2
(Turkey) Dilşat Yıldız	0	1	1	0	0	1	1	X	4

==== Semifinals ====
Sunday, August 31, 12:00 pm

Sheet A	1	2	3	4	5	6	7	8	Final
(Switzerland) Xenia Schwaller 🔨	2	1	0	0	2	0	X	X	5
(Turkey) Dilşat Yıldız	0	0	0	1	0	0	X	X	1

Sheet D	1	2	3	4	5	6	7	8	9	Final
(Norway) Torild Bjørnstad 🔨	1	0	1	1	0	0	2	0	2	7
(Italy) Team Constantini	0	1	0	0	2	1	0	1	0	5

==== Final ====
Sunday, August 31, 2:30 pm

Sheet C	1	2	3	4	5	6	7	8	Final
(Switzerland) Xenia Schwaller 🔨	2	0	2	0	0	0	3	X	7
(Norway) Torild Bjørnstad	0	1	0	1	0	0	0	X	2
