= Hannah Augustin =

Austrian curler

- Curler ♀
- Born: 24 January 1990 (age 36); Shoreview, Minnesota, United States

Team
- Curling club: Ottakringer Curlingclub, Vienna
- Mixed doubles partner: Martin Reichel

Curling career
- Member Association: Austria
- World Mixed Doubles Championship: 2 (2019, 2023)
- European Championship: 10 (2015, 2016, 2017, 2018, 2019, 2021, 2022, 2023, 2024, 2025)
- Other appearances: World Mixed Championship: 2 (2016, 2017)

Hannah Lucille Augustin (born 24 January 1990 in Shoreview, Minnesota, United States) is an Austrian female curler.

At the national level, she is a four-time Austrian women's champion curler, a two-time Austrian mixed champion, and a three-time Austrian mixed doubles champion curler.

== Teams ==
=== Women's ===
Season	Skip	Third	Second	Lead	Alternate	Coach	Events
United States
2011–12	Amy Anderson	Hannah Augustin	Ann Flis	Karen Volkman			
Austria
2015–16	Hannah Augustin	Marijke Reitsma	Elisabeth Trauner	Rebecca Rose Csenár	Anna Weghuber	Dick Henderson	ECC 2015 (20th)
2015–16	Hannah Augustin	Marijke Reitsma	Rebecca Csenár	Elisabeth Trauner			
2016–17	Constanze Ocker	Hannah Augustin	Marijke Reitsma	Elisabeth Trauner	Rebecca Csenár	Dick Henderson	ECC 2016 (21st)
2017–18	Hannah Augustin	Marijke Reitsma	Madelaine Reiner	Johanna Höß	Jill Witschen	Uli Kapp	ECC 2017 (25th)
2018–19	Constanze Ocker	Hannah Augustin	Marijke Reitsma	Jill Witschen	Johanna Höß	Bill Witschen, Juliane Hummelt	ECC 2018 (21st)
2019–20	Constanze Ocker	Hannah Augustin	Marijke Reitsma	Jill Witschen	Johanna Höß	Björn Schröder	ECC 2019 (21st)
2021–22	Hannah Augustin	Marijke Reitsma	Sara Haidinger	Johanna Höß	Teresa Treichl	Matthias Zobel	ECC 2021 (16th)
2022–23	Hannah Augustin (fourth)	Marijke Reitsma (skip)	Sara Haidinger	Johanna Höß	Verena Pfluegler	Jean Pierre Ruetsche	ECC 2022 (18th)
2023–24	Hannah Augustin (fourth)	Verena Pfluegler (skip)	Johanna Höß	Jill Witschen	Julia Kotek	Daniela Jentsch	ECC 2023 (17th)
2024–25	Hannah Augustin (fourth)	Verena Pfluegler (skip)	Teresa Treichl	Johanna Höß	Emma Müller	Daniela Jentsch	ECC 2024 (18th)
2025–26	Verena Pfluegler	Hannah Augustin	Astrid Pflügler	Johanna Höß	Jill Witschen	Brian Chick	ECC 2025 (14th)

=== Mixed ===
Season	Skip	Third	Second	Lead	Coach	Events
2016–17	Andreas Unterberger	Hannah Augustin	Gernot Higatzberger	Celine Moser		WMxCC 2016 (25th)
2017–18	Andreas Unterberger	Hannah Augustin	Gernot Higatzberger	Celine Moser	Sally Augustin	WMxCC 2017 (36th)

=== Mixed doubles ===
Season	Male	Female	Coach	Events
2018–19	Martin Reichel	Hannah Augustin	Björn Schröder	WMDCC 2019 (23rd)
2019–20	Martin Reichel	Hannah Augustin	Björn Schröder	WMDQ 2019 (5th)
2020–21	Martin Reichel	Hannah Augustin		
2022–23	Martin Reichel	Hannah Augustin	Björn Schröder	WMDQ 2022 (gold); WMDCC 2023 (17th)

== Personal life ==
Hannah Augustin attended McGill University and University of Salzburg.
