= Matthäus Hofer =

Austrian curler (born 2004)

- Curler ♂
- Born: 2004 (age 21–22); Kitzbühel, Austria

Team
- Curling club: Kitzbühel CC, Kitzbühel
- Skip: Mathias Genner
- Third: Jonas Backofen
- Second: Matthäus Hofer
- Lead: Martin Reichel
- Alternate: Johann Karg

Curling career
- Member Association: Austria
- World Championship: 1 (2025)
- European Championship: 2 (2025, 2026)
Medal record
Curling
Austrian Mixed Doubles Championship
Gold medal – first place	2023 Kitzbühel
Silver medal – second place	2022 Kitzbühel

Matthäus Hofer (born 2004 in Kitzbühel) is an Austrian male curler from Kitzbühel.

At the national level, he is an Austrian mixed doubles champion curler.

== Teams and events ==
=== Men's ===
Season	Skip	Third	Second	Lead	Alternate	Coach	Events
2020–21	Matthäus Hofer	Zott David	Johann Karg	Moritz Jöchl			AMCC 2020 (4th)
2021–22	Mathias Genner	Jonas Backofen	Martin Reichel	Lukas Kirchmair	Matthäus Hofer	Björn Schröder, Andreas Winkler	ECC-B 2021 (15th)
2021–22	Jonas Backofen (fourth)	Matthäus Hofer	Gernot Higatzberger (skip)	Moritz Jöchl	Johann Karg	Björn Schröder	POQE 2021 (7th)
2021–22	Matthäus Hofer	Johann Karg	Zott David	Moritz Jöchl			AMCC 2022 (4th)
2021–22	Matthäus Hofer	Johann Karg	Zott David	Moritz Jöchl		Christopher Noble	WJBCC 2022 (Dec) (10th)
2023–24	Matthäus Hofer	Johann Karg	Zott David	Moritz Jöchl		Greig Smith	WJBCC 2023 (10th)
2024–25	Matthäus Hofer	David Zott	Florian Kramlinger	Johannes Kramlinger	Christoph Neumayr	Daniela Jentsch, Johann Karg	WJBCC 2024 (13th)
2024–25	Mathias Genner	Jonas Backofen	Martin Reichel	Florian Mavec	Matthäus Hofer	Brian Chick	WCC 2025 (12th)

=== Mixed doubles ===
Season	Female	Male	Coach	Events
2019—20	Jill Witschen	Matthäus Hofer		AMDCC 2020 (6th)
2021—22	Astrid Pfluegler	Matthäus Hofer		AMDCC 2022 (silver)
2022—23	Astrid Pfluegler	Matthäus Hofer		AMDCC 2023 (gold)
2023—24	Astrid Pfluegler	Matthäus Hofer	Björn Schröder	WMDQE 2023 (13th)

== Personal life ==
As of 2025, he is a student. He started curling in 2014 at the age of 10.
