= Karina Toth =

Austrian curler

- Curler ♀
- Born: 27 September 1983 (age 43); Kitzbühel

Team
- Curling club: Kitzbühel CC, Kitzbühel
- Mixed doubles partner: Sebastian Wunderer

Curling career
- Member Association: Austria
- World Mixed Doubles Championship: 2 (2009, 2016)
- European Championship: 10 (2004, 2005, 2006, 2007, 2008, 2009, 2010, 2011, 2012, 2014)
- Other appearances: World Mixed Championship: 1 (2015), European Mixed Championship: 5 (2007, 2009, 2010, 2012, 2014)

Karina Toth (born 27 September 1983 in Kitzbühel) is an Austrian female curler.

At the national level, she is a ten-time Austrian women's champion curler, an eight-time Austrian mixed champion, and a two-time Austrian mixed doubles champion curler.

== Teams ==
=== Women's ===
Season	Skip	Third	Second	Lead	Alternate	Coach	Events
2004–05	Claudia Toth	Karina Toth	Theresa Egger	Rebecca Rose Seidl	Edeltraud Koudelka	Edeltraud Koudelka	ECC 2004 (11th)
2005–06	Claudia Toth	Karina Toth	Constanze Hummelt	Alexandra Brückmiller		Cindra Bishop	ECC 2005 (9th)
2006–07	Claudia Toth	Karina Toth	Alexandra Brückmiller	Constanze Hummelt		Cindra Bishop	ECC 2006 (11th)
2007–08	Claudia Toth	Karina Toth	Jasmin Seidl	Constanze Hummelt	Alexandra Brückmiller	Katja Weisser	ECC 2007 (9th)
2008–09	Karina Toth	Constanze Hummelt	Jasmin Seidl	Alexandra Brückmiller	Verena Hagenbuchner	Rodger Gustaf Schmidt	ECC 2008 (17th)
2009–10	Karina Toth	Jacqueline Greiner	Jasmin Seidl	Constanze Hummelt		Rodger Gustaf Schmidt	ECC 2009 (13th)
2010–11	Karina Toth	Constanze Hummelt	Marion Schön	Andrea Höfler	Tina Sauerstein	Rodger Gustaf Schmidt	ECC 2010 (13th)
2011–12	Karina Toth	Constanze Hummelt	Andrea Höfler	Tina Sauerstein		Rodger Gustaf Schmidt	ECC 2011 (15th)
2012–13	Karina Toth	Constanze Hummelt	Anna Weghuber	Marijke Reitsma		Andreas Winkler, Uli Kapp	ECC 2012 (13th)
2014–15	Karina Toth	Constanze Hummelt	Anna Weghuber	Andrea Höfler	Marijke Reitsma	Dick Henderson	ECC 2014 (14th)

=== Mixed ===
Season	Skip	Third	Second	Lead	Alternate	Coach	Events
2007–08	Andreas Unterberger (fourth)	Claudia Toth (skip)	Florian Huber	Karina Toth	Constanze Hummelt		EMxCC 2007 (4th)
2009–10	Karina Toth	Andreas Unterberger	Jacqueline Greiner	Florian Huber			EMxCC 2009 (10th)
2010–11	Claudia Toth	Florian Huber	Constanze Hummelt	Christian Roth	Karina Toth		EMxCC 2010 (6th)
2012–13	Karina Toth	Sebastian Wunderer	Constanze Hummelt	Mathias Genner			EmxCC 2012 (4th)
2014–15	Sebastian Wunderer (fourth)	Karina Toth (skip)	Mathias Genner	Andrea Höfler			EmxCC 2014 (13th)
2015–16	Karina Toth	Mathias Genner	Constanze Ocker	Martin Reichel		Uli Kapp	WMxCC 2015 (25th)

=== Mixed doubles ===
Season	Male	Female	Coach	Events
2008–09	Andreas Unterberger	Karina Toth		WMDCC 2009 (21st)
2015–16	Sebastian Wunderer	Karina Toth	Uli Kapp	WMDCC 2016 (11th)

== Personal life ==
Her older sister Claudia Fischer (born as Claudia Toth) is also a curler, they was teammates many years.
