= Austrian Mixed Curling Championship =

The Austrian Mixed Curling Championship (German: ÖCV Ergebnisse Staatsmeisterschafte, ÖSTM Mixed) is the national championship of mixed curling in Austria. Team are composed of two men and two women, playing in alternating positions up the team, meaning the lead and third must be of the same gender, and likewise the second and fourth players. The championship has been held annually since 2005. It is organized by the Austrian Curling Association (German: Österreichischer Curling Verband).

== List of champions and medallists ==
(Team line-up in order: skip (marked bold), third, second, lead, alternate(s), coach)

Year	Host city, arena, dates	Champion team	Runner-up	Bronze	Placement at Euros	Placement at Worlds
2005	Kitzbühel, Curlinghalle; 14—16 October	KCC 2 Herbert Dalik, Margit Dalik, Dominik Bertsch, Magdalena Holzer, alternate: Constanze Ocker (Hummelt)	KCC 1 Roland Koudelka, Margit Holzer, Rupert Holzer, Edeltraud Koudelka	CC Traun 1 Max Schagerl, Verena Schagerl (Hagenbuchner), Rainer Ammer, Jasmin Seidl	—	—
2007	Kitzbühel, Curlinghalle; 19—22 April	KCC 2 Andreas Unterberger, Claudia Toth, Florian Huber, Constanze Ocker (Hummelt)	KCC 1 Roland Koudelka, Margit Holzer, Rupert Holzer, Edeltraud Koudelka	CC Traun 1 Günter Dressler, Rebecca Csenar (Seidl), Christopher Csenar, Karin Dressler (Trauner)	4	—
2008	Kitzbühel, Curlinghalle; 17—20 April	CC Traun 1 Markus Schagerl, Verena Schagerl (Hagenbuchner), Rainer Ammer, Jasmin Seidl	CC Traun 2 Christopher Csenar, Rebecca Csenar (Seidl), Günter Dressler, Karin Dressler (Trauner)	KCC 1 Andreas Unterberger, Claudia Toth, Florian Huber, Constanze Ocker (Hummelt)	15	—
2009	Kitzbühel, Curlinghalle; 27 February — 1 March	KCC 1 Andreas Unterberger, Claudia Toth, Florian Huber, Constanze Ocker (Hummelt)	CC Traun 1 Markus Schagerl, Verena Schagerl (Hagenbuchner), Rainer Ammer, Jasmin Seidl	CC Traun 2 Günter Dressler, Karin Dressler (Trauner), Gerald Raab, Elisabeth Trauner	10	—
2010	Kitzbühel, Curlinghalle; 26—28 March	KCC 1 Karina Toth, Florian Huber, Constanze Ocker (Hummelt), Christian Roth, alternate: Claudia Fischer	CFÖ; Markus Forejtek, Tina Forejtek (Sauerstein), Marcus Schmitt, Liliana Schmitt	OCC 2 Peter Ponitzky, Andrea Purzner (Höfler), Felix Purzner, E. Stummerer, alternate: Markus Schmidt	6	—
2011	Kitzbühel, Curlinghalle; 11—13 February	KCC 1 Claudia Fischer, Christian Roth, Andrea Purzner (Höfler), Florian Huber	KCC 2 Karina Toth, Sebastian Wunderer, Constanze Ocker (Hummelt), Mathias Genner, alternate: Martin Reichel	CFÖ 2 Thomas Peichl, S. Peichl, Christian Los, B. Los	5	—
2012	Kitzbühel, Curlinghalle; 24—26 February	KCC 2 Karina Toth, Florian Huber, Constanze Ocker (Hummelt), Sebastian Wunderer, alternate: Mathias Genner	CFÖ 2 Markus Forejtek, Andrea Purzner (Höfler), Felix Purzner, Tina Forejtek (Sauerstein)	KCC 1 Claudia Fischer, Christian Roth, Marijke Reitsma, Nikolaus Gasteiger	4	—
2013	Kitzbühel, Curlinghalle; 28 February — 3 March	KCC 1 Karina Toth, Sebastian Wunderer, Constanze Ocker (Hummelt), Mathias Genner	KCC 3 Andreas Unterberger, Veronika Huber, Günter Huber, Anna Reiner, alternate: Edeltraud Koudelka	CC Traun 1 Markus Schagerl, Verena Schagerl (Hagenbuchner), Rainer Ammer, Anna Weghuber, alternate: Jasmin Seidl	13	—
2014	Kitzbühel, Curlinghalle; 20—23 March	KCC 1 Karina Toth, Sebastian Wunderer, Constanze Ocker (Hummelt), Mathias Genner	DCCL; Markus Schagerl, Verena Schagerl (Hagenbuchner), Rainer Ammer, Anna Weghuber	OCC 1 Martin Reichel, Andrea Purzner (Höfler), Felix Purzner, Marijke Reitsma	13	—
2015	Kitzbühel, Curlinghalle; 13—15 March	KCC 1 Karina Toth, Sebastian Wunderer, Constanze Ocker (Hummelt), Mathias Genner	DCCL; Markus Schagerl, Verena Schagerl (Hagenbuchner), Rainer Ammer, Anna Weghuber	OCC 1 Martin Reichel, Andrea Purzner (Höfler), Felix Purzner, Marijke Reitsma	—	25
2016	Kitzbühel, Curlinghalle; 4—6 March	KCC 1 Karina Toth, Sebastian Wunderer, Constanze Ocker (Hummelt), Mathias Genner	CFÖ; Markus Forejtek, M. Egretzberger, Tina Forejtek (Sauerstein), Martin Egretzberger	OCC; Gernot Higatzberger, Hannah Augustin, Hubert Gründhammer, Celine Moser	—	25
2017	Kitzbühel, Curlinghalle; 3—5 March	OCC; Andreas Unterberger, Hannah Augustin, Gernot Higatzberger, Celine Moser	DCCL; Markus Schagerl, Anna Weghuber, Björn Eichinger, Jasmin Seidl	KCC; Lukas Kirchmair, Sara Haidinger, Martin Seiwald, Chiara Puchinger	—	36
2018	Kitzbühel, Curlinghalle; 8—21 March	KCC 2 Veronika Huber, Jonas Backofen, Edeltraud Koudelka, Florian Mavec	KCC 1 Lukas Kirchmair, Chiara Puchinger, Martin Seiwald, Verena Pflügler	CC Traun; Günter Dressler, Karin Dressler (Trauner), Gerald Raab, Elisabeth Trauner	—	28
2019	Kitzbühel, Curlinghalle; 7—10 March	DCCL; Markus Schagerl, Verena Schager (Hagenbuchner), Björn Eichinger, Anna Weghuber	OCC; Andreas Unterberger, Hannah Augustin, Gernot Higatzberger, C. Kramlinger	KCC; Lukas Kirchmair, Chiara Puchinger, Martin Reichel, Iris Yudan	—	32
2020	Kitzbühel, Curlinghalle; 5—8 March	OCC; Andreas Unterberger, Hannah Augustin, Gernot Higatzberger, Astrid Pflügler	KCC 1 Karina Toth, Sebastian Wunderer, Constanze Ocker (Hummelt), Martin Reichel	KCC 2 Florian Mavec, Jill Witschen, Sean Purcell, Johanna Höss	—	—
2021	not held because COVID-19					

== See also ==
- Austrian Men's Curling Championship
- Austrian Women's Curling Championship
- Austrian Mixed Doubles Curling Championship
- Austrian Junior Curling Championships
