= Florian Mavec =

Austrian curler

- Curler ♂
- Born: 2001 (age 24–25); St. Johann in Tirol, Austria

Team
- Curling club: Kitzbühel CC, Kitzbühel
- Skip: Mathias Genner
- Third: Jonas Backofen
- Second: Martin Reichel
- Lead: Florian Mavec

Curling career
- Member Association: Austria
- World Championship: 1 (2025)
- European Championship: 2 (2024, 2026)
Medal record
Curling
Austrian Men's Championship
Silver medal – second place	2018 Kitzbühel
Silver medal – second place	2022 Kitzbühel
Gold medal – first place	2023 Kitzbühel
Gold medal – first place	2024 Prag
Austrian Mixed Championship
Gold medal – first place	2018 Kitzbühel
Bronze medal – third place	2020 Kitzbühel

Florian Mavec (born 2001 in St. Johann in Tirol) is an Austrian male curler from Vienna.

At the national level, he is a 2018 Austrian mixed champion curler.

== Teams and events ==
=== Men's ===
Season	Skip	Third	Second	Lead	Alternate	Coach	Events
2016–17	Martin Seiwald	Florian Mavec	Jonas Backofen	Damir Srebric	Konstantin Kammerhofer	Boris Seidl	WJBCC 2017 (20th)
2017–18	Martin Seiwald (fourth)	Jonas Backofen	Damir Srebric	Florian Mavec (skip)	Sean Purcell	Boris Seidl	WJBCC 2018 (22nd)
2018–19	Jonas Backofen	Martin Seiwald	Sean Purcell	Florian Mavec	Thomas Wittischlaeger	Boris Seidl	WJBCC 2019 (Jan) (21st)
2019–20	Sebastian Wunderer	Martin Reichel	Martin Seiwald	Florian Mavec	Jonas Backofen	Björn Schröder	ECC-B 2019 (21st)
2019–20	Jonas Backofen (fourth)	Florian Mavec (skip)	Martin Seiwald	Sean Purcell	Thomas Wittischlaeger	Björn Schröder, Gernot Higatzberger	WJBCC 2019 (Dec) (15th)
2022–23	Mathias Genner	Jonas Backofen	Martin Reichel	Florian Mavec	Philipp Nothegger	Björn Schröder, Andreas Winkler	ECC-B 2022 (17th)
2023–24	Mathias Genner	Jonas Backofen	Martin Reichel	Florian Mavec	Moritz Jöchl	Björn Schröder, Daniela Jentsch	ECC-B 2023 (12th)
2024–25	Mathias Genner	Jonas Backofen	Martin Reichel	Florian Mavec	Johann Karg	Björn Schröder	ECC 2024 (7th)
2024–25	Mathias Genner	Jonas Backofen	Martin Reichel	Florian Mavec	Matthäus Hofer	Brian Chick	WCC 2025 (12th)

=== Mixed ===
Season	Skip	Third	Second	Lead	Events
2017–18	Veronika Huber	Jonas Backofen	Edeltraud Koudelka	Florian Mavec	AmxCC 2018 (gold)
2019–20	Florian Mavec	Jill Witschen	Sean Purcell	Johanna Höss	AmxCC 2020 (bronze)

== Personal life ==
As of 2025 he is a student. He started curling in 2013 at the age of 12.
