= 2023 World Mixed Doubles Qualification Event =

- Host city: Dumfries, Scotland
- Arena: Dumfries Ice Bowl
- Dates: December 2–7
- Qualifiers: Germany; France; New Zealand; China

The 2023 World Mixed Doubles Qualification Event was held from December 2 to 7 at the Dumfries Ice Bowl in Dumfries, Scotland. The top four placing teams (Germany, France, New Zealand, and China) qualified for the 2024 World Mixed Doubles Curling Championship in Östersund, Sweden.

== Teams ==
The teams are as follows:

Austria	Belgium	Brazil	China
Female: Astrid Pflügler; Male: Matthäus Hofer	Female: Caro Van Oosterwyck; Male: Jeroen Spruyt	Female: Fabiana Cristina De Souza Campos; Male: Felipe Augusto Ribeiro Pires	Female: Yang Ying; Male: Tian Jiafeng
Chinese Taipei	England	Finland	France
Female: Amanda Chou; Male: Brendon Liu	Female: Lina Opel; Male: Michael Opel	Female: Lotta Immonen; Male: Markus Sipilä	Female: Kseniya Shevchuk; Male: Wilfrid Coulot
Germany	Guyana	Hong Kong	Hungary
Female: Lena Kapp; Male: Sixten Totzek	Female: Farzana Hussain; Male: Rayad Husain	Female: Ling-Yue Hung; Male: Jason Chang	Female: Csilla Halász; Male: Gabor Ezsöl
India	Ireland	Jamaica	Kyrgyzstan
Female: Namini Chaudhari; Male: P. N. Raju	Female: Alison Fyfe; Male: John Wilson	Female: Madeleine Spurgeon; Male: Ian Robertson	Female: Keremet Asanbaeva; Male: Beksultan Myrzabaev
Latvia	Lithuania	Mexico	New Zealand
Female: Santa Blumberga-Bērziņa; Male: Andris Bremanis	Female: Lina Janulevičiūtė; Male: Donatas Kiudys	Female: Estefana Quintero; Male: Ismael Abreu	Female: Courtney Smith; Male: Anton Hood
Poland	Portugal	Slovakia	Slovenia
Female: Adela Walczak; Male: Andrzej Augustyniak	Female: Antonieta Martins Ethier; Male: Vitor Santos	Female: Silvia Sýkorová; Male: Marek Sýkora	Female: Liza Gregori; Male: Simon Langus
Ukraine	Wales		
Female: Diana Moskalenko; Male: Artem Suhak	Female: Laura Beever; Male: Garry Coombs		

== Round robin standings ==
Final Round Robin Standings

Key
Teams to Playoffs

Group A	W	L	W–L	DSC
Germany	6	0	–	98.00
Ireland	4	2	–	59.63
India	3	3	2–0	115.20
Latvia	3	3	1–1	36.37
Ukraine	3	3	0–2	75.20
Chinese Taipei	2	4	–	81.44
Kyrgyzstan	0	6	–	186.57

Group B	W	L	W–L	DSC
China	5	1	1–0	48.17
France	5	1	0–1	46.31
Poland	4	2	–	67.98
Austria	3	3	–	33.89
Jamaica	2	4	–	48.17
Portugal	1	5	1–0	57.47
Wales	1	5	0–1	115.68

Group C	W	L	W–L	DSC
Hungary	5	0	–	65.46
Hong Kong	3	2	1–0	63.43
Guyana	3	2	0–1	83.72
England	2	3	1–0	91.38
Mexico	2	3	0–1	104.42
Slovenia	0	5	–	122.44

Group D	W	L	W–L	DSC
Finland	5	0	–	31.86
New Zealand	3	2	1–0	63.72
Belgium	3	2	0–1	91.56
Lithuania	2	3	1–0	69.11
Slovakia	2	3	0–1	33.92
Brazil	0	5	–	120.26

Group A Round Robin Summary Table
Pos.	Country	Chinese Taipei	Germany	India		Kyrgyzstan	Latvia	Ukraine	Record
6	Chinese Taipei	—	5–9	5–2	7–11	12–5	4–9	5–6	2–4
1	Germany	9–5	—	10–4	11–2	13–2	12–0	8–3	6–0
3	India	2–5	4–10	—	7–9	14–3	10–9	8–2	3–3
2	Ireland	11–7	2–11	9–7	—	9–3	8–5	5–7	4–2
7	Kyrgyzstan	5–12	2–13	3–14	3–9	—	7–11	7–13	0–6
4	Latvia	9–4	0–12	9–10	5–8	11–7	—	9–8	3–3
5	Ukraine	6–5	3–8	2–8	7–5	13–7	8–9	—	3–3

Group B Round Robin Summary Table
Pos.	Country	Austria	China	France	Jamaica	Poland	Portugal	Wales	Record
4	Austria	—	3–10	3–8	9–4	8–5	9–7	5–7	3–3
1	China	10–3	—	6–1	10–2	L–W	9–6	13–1	5–1
2	France	8–3	1–6	—	8–6	12–3	9–7	8–2	5–1
5	Jamaica	4–9	2–10	6–8	—	2–10	11–2	12–5	2–4
3	Poland	5–8	W–L	3–12	10–2	—	7–6	6–5	4–2
6	Portugal	7–9	6–9	7–9	2–11	6–7	—	9–8	1–5
7	Wales	7–5	1–13	2–8	5–12	5–6	8–9	—	1–5

Group C Round Robin Summary Table
Pos.	Country	England	Guyana	Hong Kong	Hungary	Mexico	Slovenia	Record
4	England	—	7–8	5–7	7–9	9–8	7–4	2–3
3	Guyana	8–7	—	4–13	4–9	9–4	10–3	3–2
2	Hong Kong	7–5	13–4	—	5–9	4–7	10–6	3–2
1	Hungary	9–7	9–4	9–5	—	11–4	8–2	5–0
5	Mexico	8–9	4–9	7–4	4–11	—	9–6	2–3
6	Slovenia	4–7	3–10	6–10	2–8	6–9	—	0–5

Group D Round Robin Summary Table
Pos.	Country	Belgium	Brazil	Finland	Lithuania	New Zealand	Slovakia	Record
3	Belgium	—	14–0	3–9	9–4	3–9	7–6	3–2
6	Brazil	0–14	—	0–11	2–9	2–10	4–8	0–5
1	Finland	9–3	11–0	—	6–3	7–6	8–4	5–0
4	Lithuania	4–9	9–2	3–6	—	6–8	11–2	2–3
2	New Zealand	9–3	10–2	6–7	8–6	—	3–8	3–2
5	Slovakia	6–7	8–4	4–8	2–11	8–3	—	2–3

== Round robin results ==
All draw times are listed in Greenwich Mean Time (UTC+00:00).

=== Draw 1 ===
Saturday, December 2, 17:00

Sheet A	1	2	3	4	5	6	7	8	Final
Finland 🔨	1	0	1	1	1	1	2	2	9
Belgium	0	3	0	0	0	0	0	0	3

Sheet C	1	2	3	4	5	6	7	8	Final
England	0	0	1	1	2	0	1	X	5
Hong Kong 🔨	4	1	0	0	0	2	0	X	7

Sheet B	1	2	3	4	5	6	7	8	Final
Hungary	0	2	2	1	0	2	1	X	8
Slovenia 🔨	1	0	0	0	1	0	0	X	2

Sheet F	1	2	3	4	5	6	7	8	Final
Slovakia 🔨	0	2	0	0	0	0	X	X	2
Lithuania	2	0	2	2	3	2	X	X	11

=== Draw 2 ===
Saturday, December 2, 20:30

Sheet A	1	2	3	4	5	6	7	8	9	Final
Latvia	0	1	1	0	0	3	0	3	1	9
Ukraine 🔨	1	0	0	2	1	0	4	0	0	8

Sheet C	1	2	3	4	5	6	7	8	Final
India 🔨	4	2	2	0	2	4	0	X	14
Kyrgyzstan	0	0	0	2	0	0	1	X	3

Sheet E	1	2	3	4	5	6	7	8	Final
Germany	2	0	4	0	4	1	X	X	11
Ireland 🔨	0	0	0	2	0	0	X	X	2

Sheet B	1	2	3	4	5	6	7	8	Final
France	0	0	0	4	1	1	0	3	9
Portugal 🔨	1	2	1	0	0	0	3	0	7

Sheet D	1	2	3	4	5	6	7	8	Final
Poland	0	3	0	0	0	2	0	0	5
Austria 🔨	3	0	1	1	1	0	1	1	8

Sheet F	1	2	3	4	5	6	7	8	Final
Wales	0	0	0	0	1	0	X	X	1
China 🔨	4	3	1	2	0	3	X	X	13

=== Draw 3 ===
Sunday, December 3, 9:00

Sheet A	1	2	3	4	5	6	7	8	Final
England 🔨	0	0	1	1	1	3	0	1	7
Slovenia	1	1	0	0	0	0	2	0	4

Sheet D	1	2	3	4	5	6	7	8	Final
Guyana 🔨	0	1	2	1	1	0	3	1	9
Mexico	1	0	0	0	0	3	0	0	4

Sheet C	1	2	3	4	5	6	7	8	Final
New Zealand 🔨	0	2	1	2	0	3	2	X	10
Brazil	1	0	0	0	1	0	0	X	2

Sheet E	1	2	3	4	5	6	7	8	Final
Slovakia 🔨	0	1	0	0	4	0	1	0	6
Belgium	1	0	1	2	0	2	0	1	7

=== Draw 4 ===
Sunday, December 3, 12:30

Sheet A	1	2	3	4	5	6	7	8	Final
Germany 🔨	1	1	4	0	3	2	2	X	13
Kyrgyzstan	0	0	0	2	0	0	0	X	2

Sheet C	1	2	3	4	5	6	7	8	Final
Latvia 🔨	1	0	0	3	0	1	0	0	5
Ireland	0	2	2	0	1	0	2	1	8

Sheet E	1	2	3	4	5	6	7	8	Final
India	0	0	0	0	0	1	1	X	2
Chinese Taipei 🔨	1	1	1	1	1	0	0	X	5

Sheet B	1	2	3	4	5	6	7	8	Final
Austria 🔨	0	0	0	0	2	0	1	X	3
France	2	1	2	1	0	2	0	X	8

Sheet D	1	2	3	4	5	6	7	8	Final
Jamaica	0	0	0	0	2	0	X	X	2
Poland 🔨	4	1	2	1	0	2	X	X	10

Sheet F	1	2	3	4	5	6	7	8	Final
China 🔨	0	1	2	2	0	3	0	1	9
Portugal	2	0	0	0	3	0	1	0	6

=== Draw 5 ===
Sunday, December 3, 16:00

Sheet A	1	2	3	4	5	6	7	8	Final
Mexico	1	0	0	4	2	0	0	X	7
Hong Kong 🔨	0	1	1	0	0	1	1	X	4

Sheet D	1	2	3	4	5	6	7	8	Final
Hungary 🔨	0	0	1	1	2	0	5	0	9
England	1	2	0	0	0	2	0	2	7

Sheet B	1	2	3	4	5	6	7	8	9	Final
Lithuania 🔨	0	1	0	2	0	2	1	0	0	6
New Zealand	1	0	1	0	3	0	0	1	2	8

Sheet F	1	2	3	4	5	6	7	8	Final
Brazil	0	0	0	0	0	0	X	X	0
Finland 🔨	2	1	1	2	2	3	X	X	11

=== Draw 6 ===
Sunday, December 3, 19:30

Sheet A	1	2	3	4	5	6	7	8	Final
Ukraine 🔨	0	0	0	1	0	0	1	X	2
India	1	1	2	0	2	2	0	X	8

Sheet C	1	2	3	4	5	6	7	8	Final
Kyrgyzstan	0	2	0	1	1	0	1	X	5
Chinese Taipei 🔨	3	0	5	0	0	4	0	X	12

Sheet E	1	2	3	4	5	6	7	8	Final
Latvia	0	0	0	0	0	0	X	X	0
Germany 🔨	2	1	2	3	2	2	X	X	12

Sheet B	1	2	3	4	5	6	7	8	Final
Poland	0	4	0	2	2	0	1		W
China 🔨	3	0	1	0	0	2	0	/	L

Sheet D	1	2	3	4	5	6	7	8	Final
Wales 🔨	0	3	1	1	2	0	0	1	8
Portugal	4	0	0	0	0	3	2	0	9

Sheet F	1	2	3	4	5	6	7	8	Final
Jamaica	2	1	0	0	0	1	0	X	4
Austria 🔨	0	0	4	2	1	0	2	X	9

- China forfeited the game as they ran out of time during the eighth end.

=== Draw 7 ===
Monday, December 4, 9:00

Sheet A	1	2	3	4	5	6	7	8	Final
Jamaica	1	0	0	0	4	1	0	0	6
France 🔨	0	1	1	3	0	0	2	1	8

Sheet C	1	2	3	4	5	6	7	8	9	Final
Poland 🔨	0	0	0	2	1	0	2	0	1	6
Wales	1	1	1	0	0	1	0	1	0	5

Sheet E	1	2	3	4	5	6	7	8	Final
Austria 🔨	0	0	0	2	0	1	0	X	3
China	1	3	1	0	1	0	4	X	10

Sheet B	1	2	3	4	5	6	7	8	Final
Ukraine 🔨	0	0	1	1	1	0	3	0	6
Chinese Taipei	1	1	0	0	0	1	0	2	5

Sheet D	1	2	3	4	5	6	7	8	Final
Germany 🔨	2	0	5	1	0	2	X	X	10
India	0	1	0	0	3	0	X	X	4

Sheet F	1	2	3	4	5	6	7	8	Final
Ireland 🔨	2	0	0	1	3	0	3	X	9
Kyrgyzstan	0	1	1	0	0	1	0	X	3

=== Draw 8 ===
Monday, December 4, 12:30

Sheet C	1	2	3	4	5	6	7	8	Final
Slovenia	2	0	0	0	0	1	X	X	3
Guyana 🔨	0	4	1	3	2	0	X	X	10

Sheet E	1	2	3	4	5	6	7	8	Final
Hong Kong	0	3	1	0	0	0	1	0	5
Hungary 🔨	1	0	0	1	1	3	0	3	9

Sheet D	1	2	3	4	5	6	7	8	Final
Lithuania	1	0	0	1	0	0	1	X	3
Finland 🔨	0	1	1	0	3	1	0	X	6

Sheet F	1	2	3	4	5	6	7	8	Final
Belgium	0	0	0	0	2	1	0	X	3
New Zealand 🔨	3	1	1	2	0	0	2	X	9

=== Draw 9 ===
Monday, December 4, 16:00

Sheet A	1	2	3	4	5	6	7	8	Final
Portugal 🔨	0	2	0	1	1	1	0	1	6
Poland	1	0	2	0	0	0	4	0	7

Sheet C	1	2	3	4	5	6	7	8	Final
China 🔨	4	0	3	0	1	2	X	X	10
Jamaica	0	1	0	1	0	0	X	X	2

Sheet E	1	2	3	4	5	6	7	8	Final
France 🔨	1	0	2	2	0	2	1	X	8
Wales	0	1	0	0	1	0	0	X	2

Sheet B	1	2	3	4	5	6	7	8	Final
Kyrgyzstan	0	0	4	0	3	0	0	0	7
Latvia 🔨	2	1	0	2	0	4	1	1	11

Sheet D	1	2	3	4	5	6	7	8	Final
Ireland 🔨	1	0	0	2	0	0	2	0	5
Ukraine	0	1	1	0	2	2	0	1	7

Sheet F	1	2	3	4	5	6	7	8	Final
Chinese Taipei 🔨	0	3	0	0	1	1	0	X	5
Germany	1	0	2	2	0	0	4	X	9

=== Draw 10 ===
Monday, December 4, 19:30

Sheet A	1	2	3	4	5	6	7	8	Final
Brazil	0	0	1	0	1	1	1	0	4
Slovakia 🔨	1	1	0	4	0	0	0	2	8

Sheet C	1	2	3	4	5	6	7	8	Final
Lithuania 🔨	0	0	0	1	1	0	2	X	4
Belgium	3	1	2	0	0	3	0	X	9

Sheet E	1	2	3	4	5	6	7	8	Final
Finland	0	2	0	2	0	2	0	1	7
New Zealand 🔨	2	0	2	0	1	0	1	0	6

Sheet B	1	2	3	4	5	6	7	8	Final
England	0	2	0	1	0	4	0	2	9
Mexico 🔨	1	0	4	0	1	0	2	0	8

Sheet D	1	2	3	4	5	6	7	8	9	Final
Hong Kong 🔨	0	2	1	1	1	0	1	0	4	10
Slovenia	1	0	0	0	0	2	0	3	0	6

Sheet F	1	2	3	4	5	6	7	8	Final
Hungary 🔨	0	0	0	4	2	1	2	X	9
Guyana	1	2	1	0	0	0	0	X	4

=== Draw 11 ===
Tuesday, December 5, 9:00

Sheet A	1	2	3	4	5	6	7	8	Final
Chinese Taipei	0	3	2	1	1	0	0	0	7
Ireland 🔨	5	0	0	0	0	2	1	3	11

Sheet C	1	2	3	4	5	6	7	8	Final
Portugal 🔨	0	3	1	0	0	2	1	0	7
Austria	1	0	0	2	4	0	0	2	9

Sheet E	1	2	3	4	5	6	7	8	Final
Kyrgyzstan	3	0	2	2	0	0	0	X	7
Ukraine 🔨	0	6	0	0	3	1	3	X	13

Sheet B	1	2	3	4	5	6	7	8	Final
Wales 🔨	0	0	2	0	2	1	0	X	5
Jamaica	2	2	0	5	0	0	3	X	12

Sheet D	1	2	3	4	5	6	7	8	Final
China	1	0	2	0	1	1	1	X	6
France 🔨	0	0	0	1	0	0	0	X	1

Sheet F	1	2	3	4	5	6	7	8	9	Final
India	0	0	3	1	0	2	2	1	1	10
Latvia 🔨	4	2	0	0	3	0	0	0	0	9

=== Draw 12 ===
Tuesday, December 5, 12:30

Sheet B	1	2	3	4	5	6	7	8	Final
Hong Kong 🔨	2	3	0	0	3	0	5	X	13
Guyana	0	0	1	1	0	2	0	X	4

Sheet E	1	2	3	4	5	6	7	8	Final
Brazil 🔨	0	1	0	0	0	1	X	X	2
Lithuania	1	0	3	2	3	0	X	X	9

Sheet C	1	2	3	4	5	6	7	8	Final
Finland	1	0	3	0	2	0	2	X	8
Slovakia 🔨	0	2	0	1	0	1	0	X	4

Sheet F	1	2	3	4	5	6	7	8	Final
Slovenia	0	2	1	0	0	0	3	0	6
Mexico 🔨	1	0	0	1	1	3	0	3	9

=== Draw 13 ===
Tuesday, December 5, 16:00

Sheet A	1	2	3	4	5	6	7	8	Final
Austria	1	1	0	0	3	0	0	0	5
Wales 🔨	0	0	1	2	0	1	2	1	7

Sheet C	1	2	3	4	5	6	7	8	Final
Ukraine 🔨	0	0	2	1	0	0	0	X	3
Germany	1	1	0	0	3	2	1	X	8

Sheet E	1	2	3	4	5	6	7	8	Final
Portugal	0	0	2	0	0	0	0	X	2
Jamaica 🔨	1	1	0	1	4	2	2	X	11

Sheet B	1	2	3	4	5	6	7	8	Final
Ireland 🔨	1	0	2	2	2	2	0	X	9
India	0	5	0	0	0	0	2	X	7

Sheet D	1	2	3	4	5	6	7	8	Final
Chinese Taipei	0	1	0	0	2	0	1	X	4
Latvia 🔨	2	0	2	2	0	3	0	X	9

Sheet F	1	2	3	4	5	6	7	8	Final
France	2	0	4	2	0	4	X	X	12
Poland 🔨	0	1	0	0	2	0	X	X	3

=== Draw 14 ===
Tuesday, December 5, 19:30

Sheet B	1	2	3	4	5	6	7	8	Final
Belgium 🔨	5	1	1	2	2	3	X	X	14
Brazil	0	0	0	0	0	0	X	X	0

Sheet D	1	2	3	4	5	6	7	8	Final
New Zealand	0	0	0	1	0	2	0	X	3
Slovakia 🔨	3	2	1	0	1	0	1	X	8

Sheet C	1	2	3	4	5	6	7	8	Final
Mexico	0	2	0	1	0	1	0	X	4
Hungary 🔨	3	0	3	0	3	0	2	X	11

Sheet E	1	2	3	4	5	6	7	8	Final
Guyana 🔨	0	2	0	2	0	3	0	1	8
England	1	0	2	0	3	0	1	0	7

== Playoffs ==
=== A Bracket ===
Qualifier 1
A1	Germany	11
C2	Hong Kong	2
A1	Germany	7
B1	China	5
B1	China	7
D2	New Zealand	2

Qualifier 2
C1	Hungary	4
B2	France	7
B2	France	7
D1	Finland	4
D1	Finland	10
A2	Ireland	7

=== B Bracket ===
			Qualifier 3
			D1	Finland	5
C2	Hong Kong	6	D2	New Zealand	6
D2	New Zealand	10

			Qualifier 4
			B1	China	9
C1	Hungary	8	C1	Hungary	3
A2	Ireland	7

=== A Event ===
==== Semifinals ====
Wednesday, December 6, 10:00

Sheet B	1	2	3	4	5	6	7	8	Final
Germany 🔨	4	2	1	0	3	1	X	X	11
Hong Kong	0	0	0	2	0	0	X	X	2

Sheet C	1	2	3	4	5	6	7	8	Final
Hungary 🔨	0	0	1	0	1	0	2	0	4
France	1	1	0	1	0	2	0	2	7

Sheet D	1	2	3	4	5	6	7	8	Final
China 🔨	2	1	1	1	0	0	2	X	7
New Zealand	0	0	0	0	1	1	0	X	2

Sheet E	1	2	3	4	5	6	7	8	Final
Finland	1	0	3	0	4	0	0	2	10
Ireland 🔨	0	1	0	2	0	3	1	0	7

==== Finals ====
Wednesday, December 6, 15:00

Sheet C	1	2	3	4	5	6	7	8	Final
Germany	0	2	0	1	0	3	0	1	7
China 🔨	1	0	2	0	1	0	1	0	5

Sheet D	1	2	3	4	5	6	7	8	Final
France 🔨	0	1	1	2	0	2	0	1	7
Finland	1	0	0	0	2	0	1	0	4

=== B Event ===
==== Semifinals ====
Wednesday, December 6, 15:00

Sheet B	1	2	3	4	5	6	7	8	Final
Hungary	0	3	0	0	2	0	0	3	8
Ireland 🔨	1	0	2	1	0	1	2	0	7

Sheet E	1	2	3	4	5	6	7	8	Final
Hong Kong	0	1	0	0	0	5	0	X	6
New Zealand 🔨	3	0	1	1	1	0	4	X	10

==== Finals ====
Thursday, December 7, 10:00

Sheet C	1	2	3	4	5	6	7	8	9	Final
Finland	0	0	1	0	1	0	3	0	0	5
New Zealand 🔨	1	2	0	0	0	1	0	1	1	6

Sheet D	1	2	3	4	5	6	7	8	Final
China 🔨	2	0	2	1	0	4	0	X	9
Hungary	0	1	0	0	1	0	1	X	3
