= Jonas Backofen =

Austrian curler

- Curler ♂
- Born: 2001 (age 24–25); Leipzig, Germany

Team
- Curling club: Kitzbühel CC, Kitzbühel
- Skip: Mathias Genner
- Third: Jonas Backofen
- Second: Matthäus Hofer
- Lead: Martin Reichel
- Alternate: Johann Karg

Curling career
- Member Association: Austria
- World Championship: 1 (2025)
- European Championship: 3 (2024, 2025, 2026)
Medal record
Curling
Austrian Men's Championship
Silver medal – second place	2018 Kitzbühel
Silver medal – second place	2022 Kitzbühel
Austrian Mixed Championship
Gold medal – first place	2018 Kitzbühel

Jonas Backofen (born 2001 in Leipzig, Germany) is an Austrian male curler from Fieberbrunn.

At the national level, he is a 2018 Austrian mixed champion curler.

== Teams and events ==
=== Men's ===
Season	Skip	Third	Second	Lead	Alternate	Coach	Events
2015–16	Mathias Genner	Niklas Haas	Martin Seiwald	Damir Srebric	Jonas Backofen	Boris Seidl	WJBCC 2016 (20th)
2016–17	Martin Seiwald	Florian Mavec	Jonas Backofen	Damir Srebric	Konstantin Kammerhofer	Boris Seidl	WJBCC 2017 (20th)
2017–18	Martin Seiwald (fourth)	Jonas Backofen	Damir Srebric	Florian Mavec (skip)	Sean Purcell	Boris Seidl	WJBCC 2018 (22nd)
2018–19	Jonas Backofen	Martin Seiwald	Sean Purcell	Florian Mavec	Thomas Wittischlaeger	Boris Seidl	WJBCC 2019 (Jan) (21st)
2019–20	Sebastian Wunderer	Martin Reichel	Martin Seiwald	Florian Mavec	Jonas Backofen	Björn Schröder	ECC-B 2019 (21st)
2019–20	Jonas Backofen (fourth)	Florian Mavec (skip)	Martin Seiwald	Sean Purcell	Thomas Wittischlaeger	Björn Schröder, Gernot Higatzberger	WJBCC 2019 (Dec) (15th)
2021–22	Mathias Genner	Jonas Backofen	Martin Reichel	Lukas Kirchmair	Matthäus Hofer	Björn Schröder, Andreas Winkler	ECC-B 2021 (15th)
2021–22	Jonas Backofen (fourth)	Matthäus Hofer	Gernot Higatzberger (skip)	Moritz Jöchl	Johann Karg	Björn Schröder	POQE 2021 (7th)
2022–23	Mathias Genner	Jonas Backofen	Martin Reichel	Florian Mavec	Philipp Nothegger	Björn Schröder, Andreas Winkler	ECC-B 2022 (17th)
2023–24	Mathias Genner	Jonas Backofen	Martin Reichel	Florian Mavec	Moritz Jöchl	Björn Schröder, Daniela Jentsch	ECC 2023 (12th)
2024–25	Mathias Genner	Jonas Backofen	Martin Reichel	Florian Mavec	Johann Karg	Björn Schröder	ECC 2024 (7th)
2024–25	Mathias Genner	Jonas Backofen	Martin Reichel	Florian Mavec	Matthäus Hofer	Brian Chick	WCC 2025 (12th)

=== Mixed ===
Season	Skip	Third	Second	Lead	Events
2015–16	Verena Pflügler	Jonas Backofen	Chiara Puchinger	Niklas Haas	AmxCC 2016 (6th)
2017–18	Veronika Huber	Jonas Backofen	Edeltraud Koudelka	Florian Mavec	AmxCC 2018 (gold)

== Personal life ==
As of 2025 he is a sales project manager. He started curling in 2018 at the age of 17.
