= Austrian Women's Curling Championship =

The Austrian Women's Curling Championship (German: ÖCV Ergebnisse Staatsmeisterschafte, ÖSTM Damen) is the national championship of women's curling in Austria. It has been held annually since 1982. It is organized by the Austrian Curling Association (German: Österreichischer Curling Verband).

== List of champions and medallists ==
(Team line-up in order: skip (marked bold), third, second, lead, alternate(s), coach)

Year	Host city, arena, dates	Champion team	Runner-up	Bronze	Placement at Euros	Placement at Worlds
1982	Oberstdorf, Curlinghalle	KCC (Kitzbühel Curling Club), team «Unterbergerstuben» Marianne Gartner, Edeltraud Koudelka, Monica Hölzl, Herta Küchenmeister	KCC, team «Sportalm» Antje Karrer, Susanne Wieser, Uta Ferlisi, Sigried Bachler	KCC, team «Kitzbühel III» Juliane Hummelt, Ingrid Märker, Gertraud Küchl, Monika Mochny	8	—
1983	Innsbruck, Olympia-Eisstadion	KCC, team «Unterbergerstuben» Marianne Gartner, Edeltraud Koudelka, Monica Hölzl, Herta Küchenmeister	KCC, team «Blau Rot» Eva Nägele, Gertraud Küchl, Ingrid Märker, Christine Nägele	KCC, team «Sportalm» Antje Karrer, Susanne Wieser, Monika Mochny, Sigried Bachler	14	10
1984	Stuttgart, Curlinghalle	KCC, team «Unterbergerstuben» Edeltraud Koudelka, Christine Nägele, Monica Hölzl, Herta Küchenmeister, alternate: Ingrid Märker	KCC, team «Kobra» Susanne Wieser, Monika Mochny, Friederike Stiglechner, Anna Egger	KCC, team «Innsbruck» Inge Lamprecht, Elke Lamprecht, A. Maier, M. Pale, alternate: B. Wolf	7	—
1985	Kitzbühel, Zelthalle Kunsteisbahn	KCC, team «Tyrolia» Edeltraud Koudelka, Christine Nägele, Veronika Hölzl, Ingrid Märker	KCC, team «Kitzbühel» Eva Nägele, Antje Karrer, Gertraud Küchl, Herta Küchenmeister	CC Salzburg; Juliane Hummelt, Babsi Anselmi, Anna Lainer, Jutta Kober	7	—
1986	Stuttgart, Curlinghalle	CC Salzburg; Juliane Hummelt, Andrea v. Malberg, Jutta Kober, Ursula Selischkar	?	?	12	—
1987	Kitzbühel, Curlinghalle	CC Salzburg; Juliane Hummelt, Andrea v. Malberg, ?, Jutta Kober	?	?	7	—
1988	Kitzbühel, Curlinghalle	CC Innsbruck; Inge Lamprecht, Elke Lamprecht, Jutta Kober, Karin Egger	?	?	9	—
1989	Kitzbühel, Curlinghalle	KCC, team «Kitex» Christine Nägele, Eva Nägele, Monica Hölzl, Margit Dalik	?	?	12	—
1990	Kitzbühel, Curlinghalle	CC Innsbruck; Inge Lamprecht, Elke Lamprecht, Jutta Tanner, Maria Graf	KCC, team «Tyrolia» Veronika Huber, Edeltraud Koudelka, Anna Egger, Ingrid Märker	CC Salzburg; Juliane Hummelt, Gundula Schmidt, Barbara Legerer, Regine Falkensteiner	9	—
1991	Kitzbühel, Curlinghalle	KCC, team «Tyrolia» Veronika Huber, Edeltraud Koudelka, Anna Egger, Margit Holzer	CC Innsbruck; Inge Lamprecht, Elke Lamprecht, Maria Graf, Marion Seidl	CC Salzburg; Juliane Hummelt, Gundula Schmidt, Barbara Legerer, Regine Falkensteiner	9	9
1992	Kitzbühel, Curlinghalle; 21—23 February	KCC, team «Tyrolia» Veronika Huber, Edeltraud Koudelka, Margit Holzer, Anna Egger, alternate: Ingrid Märker	CC Salzburg; Juliane Hummelt, Gundula Schmidt, Barbara Legerer, B. Jandls	?	10	—
1993	Kitzbühel, Curlinghalle	CC Innsbruck; Inge Lamprecht, Elke Lamprecht, Heidi Morgenthaler, Maria Graf	KCC, team «Tyrolia» Edeltraud Koudelka, Margit Holzer, Anna Egger, Elke Koudelka	?	10	—
1994	Kitzbühel, Curlinghalle	KCC, team «Tyrolia» Edeltraud Koudelka, Margit Holzer, Anna Egger, Elke Koudelka	KCC, team «Huber» Veronika Huber, Eva Nägele, Margit Dalik, Ingrid Märker, alternate: Monica Hölz	CC Innsbruck; Inge Lamprecht, Elke Lamprecht, Heidi Morgenthaler, Maria Graf	9	—
Women's championship was not held in 1995—2003
2004	Traun, Eissportzentrum; 5—8 February	KCC; Edeltraud Koudelka, Margit Holzer, M. Obermoser, Margit Dalik	CC Traun; P. Dorn, Verena Hagenbuchner, H. Mustafa, D. Kirchmair, alternate: R. Seidl	?	11	—
2005	Kitzbühel, Curlinghalle; 10—13 February	KCC, team «Kitzbühel I» Claudia Toth, Karina Toth, Martina Egger, Constanze Hummelt, alternate: Alexandra Bruckmiller	CC Traun; Verena Hagenbuchner, H. Mustafa, Jasmin Seidl, P. Dorn	KCC, team «Kitzbühel II» Edeltraud Koudelka, Margit Holzer, Ch. Hochfilzer, K. Sammer, alternate: S. Zöhrer	9	—
2006	Traun, Eissportzentrum; 2—5 February	KCC, team «Kitzbühel I» Claudia Toth, Karina Toth, Martina Egger, Constanze Hummelt, alternate: Alexandra Bruckmiller	KCC, team «Kitzbühel II» Eva Nägele, Edeltraud Koudelka, Margit Dalik, Elke Dieterer	CC Traun; Verena Hagenbuchner, H. Mustafa, Jasmin Seidl, P. Dorn	11	—
2007	Kitzbühel, Curlinghalle; 8—11 February	KCC, team «Kitzbühel I» Claudia Toth, Karina Toth, Martina Egger, Constanze Hummelt, alternate: Alexandra Bruckmiller	KCC, team «Kitzbühel II» Margit Holzer, Edeltraud Koudelka, Margit Dalik, M. Holzer (??)	Viena CC; Veronika Polnitzky, A. König, A. Hasner, I. Kunz	9	—
2008	Traun, Eissportzentrum; 4—6 January	KCC, team «Kitzbühel I» Karina Toth, Constanze Hummelt, Alexandra Bruckmiller, Jasmin Seidl	KCC, team «Kitzbühel II» Edeltraud Koudelka, Heidlinde Gasteiger, Anna Reiner, Monica Hölz	KCC, team «Kitzbühel III» Veronika Huber, Maria Wendling, Christina Toth, Linde Bauer	17	—
2009	Sankt Pölten, Traisenpark Eissportzentrum; 7—10 May	KCC, team «Kitzbühel I» Karina Toth, Constanze Hummelt, Alexandra Bruckmiller, Jasmin Seidl	CC Traun; Verena Hagenbuchner, K. Trauner, H. Mustafa, Elisabeth Trauner	CFÖ; T. Sauerstein, U. Klein, S. Peichl, Rebecca Seidl	13	—
2010	Vienna, Wiener Stadthalle Vogelweidplatz; 25—28 February	KCC, team «Kitzbühel I» Karina Toth, J. Greiner, Claudia Toth, Constanze Hummelt	CFÖ; Tina Sauerstein, U. Klein, S. Peichl, B. Los, alternate: Liliana Schmitt	OCC; Rebecca Csenar, Andrea Höfler, Anna Weghuber, E. Stummerer, alternate: M. Egretzberger	13	—
2011	Kitzbühel, Sportpark; 24—27 March	KCC; Karina Toth, Constanze Hummelt, Andrea Höfler, Camilla Schnabel	CFÖ; Tina Sauerstein, S. Peichl, Liliana Schmitt, Marijke Reitsma	?	15	—
2012	Traun, Eissportzentrum; 2—5 February	OCC; Andrea Höfler, Tina Sauerstein, Liliana Schmitt, Veronika Polnitzky	KCC, team «Kitzbühel I» Karina Toth, Constanze Hummelt, Camilla Schnabel, Irina Brettbacher	CC Traun, team «Traun 1» Verena Hagenbuchner, Jasmin Seidl, Karin Dressler, Anna Weghuber	13	—
2013	? 2—5 May	KCC, team «Kitzbühel I» Karina Toth, Constanze Hummelt, Marijke Reitsma, L. Hagleitner	CC Traun; Verena Schagerl, Jasmin Seidl, Anna Weghuber, Ulrike Foraschik	CFÖ; Andrea Höfler, Tina Sauerstein, Liliana Schmitt, M. Egretzberger	14	—
2014	? 3—6 April	KCC, team «Kitzbühel I» Karina Toth, Constanze Hummelt, Marijke Reitsma, Hannah Augustin	KCC, team «Kitzbühel II» Veronika Huber, Edeltraud Koudelka, Anna Reiner, Heidlinde Gasteiger	CC Traun; Verena Schagerl, Jasmin Seidl, Anna Weghuber, Ulrike Foraschik	14	—
2015	Kitzbühel, Curlinghalle Sportpark; 8—12 April	DCCL; Anna Weghuber, Jasmin Seidl, Verena Schagerl, Andrea Höfler, alternate: Hannah Augustin	KCC, team «Kitzbühel I» Karina Toth, Veronika Huber, Edeltraud Koudelka, Anna Reiner	CC Traun; Rebecca Csenar, Elisabeth Trauner, Heidemarie Wallner, Karin Dressler	20	—
2016	Sankt Pölten, Eishalle; 1—3 April	CC Traun; Hannah Augustin, Elisabeth Trauner, Rebecca Csenar, Liliana Schmitt	DCCL; Anna Weghuber, Verena Schagerl, T. Forejtek, Ch. Auzinger	?	21	—
2017	? 25—28 March	DCCL; Hannah Augustin, Anna Weghuber, Marijke Reitsma, Jill Witschen	CCT; Karin Dressler, Jasmin Seidl, J. Seidl, Rebecca Csenar	?	25	—
2018	Kitzbühel, Sportpark; 22—25 March	DCCL; Anna Weghuber, Karina Toth, Verena Schagerl, Jill Witschen	KCC; Celine Moser, Sara Haidinger, Chiara Puchinger, Verena Pflügler, alternate: Astrid Pflügler	OCC; Constanze Hummelt, Hannah Augustin, Marijke Reitsma, Johanna Hoess	21	—
2019	Traun, Eissportzentrum; 24—27 January	DCCL; Anna Weghuber, Verena Schagerl, Nicole Hummelt, Jill Witschen, alternate: L. Resch	KCC; Constanze Ocker, Hannah Augustin, Marijke Reitsma, Johanna Hoess	CC Traun; Karin Dressler, Rebecca Csenar, Elisabeth Trauner, Jasmin Seidl	21	—
2020	Kitzbühel, Curlinghalle Sportpark; 9—22 October	(??) teams from men's championship shown in source			—	—
2021	not held because COVID-19					

== See also ==
- Austrian Men's Curling Championship
- Austrian Mixed Curling Championship
- Austrian Mixed Doubles Curling Championship
