= Markus Schagerl =

Austrian curler and coach

- Curler ♂
- Born: 27 March 1981 (age 45)

Team
- Curling club: CC Traun, Danube CC (Linz)
- Mixed doubles partner: Anna Weghuber

Curling career
- Member Association: Austria
- World Mixed Doubles Championship: 2 (2015, 2018)
- European Championship: 2 (2003, 2007)
- Other appearances: European Mixed Championship: 2 (2006, 2008)

Markus Schagerl (born 27 March 1981) is an Austrian curler and curling coach.

At the national level, he is a four-time Austrian men's champion curler, two-time Austrian mixed champion curler, and one-time Austrian mixed doubles champion curler.

== Teams ==
=== Men's ===
Season	Skip	Third	Second	Lead	Alternate	Coach	Events
2003–04	Harald Fendt	Markus Schagerl	Andreas Schlögel	Peter Mondl	Markus Schlögel		ECC 2003 (17th)
2007–08	Markus Schagerl	Boris Seidl	Michael Skokan	Manuel Seidl	Armin Kvas	Rodger Gustaf Schmidt	ECC 2007 (20th)
2008–09	Markus Schagerl	Armin Kvas	Boris Seidl	Manuel Seidl			
2010–11	Markus Schagerl	Armin Kvas	Manuel Seidl	Gunter Dressler			

=== Mixed ===
Season	Skip	Third	Second	Lead	Alternate	Coach	Events
2006–07	Markus Schagerl	Verena Hagenbuchner	Rainer M.M. Ammer	Jasmin Seidl			EMxCC 2006 (15th)
2008–09	Markus Schagerl	Verena Hagenbuchner	Rainer M.M. Ammer	Jasmin Seidl	Armin Kvas	Karin Trauner	EMxCC 2008 (15th)

=== Mixed doubles ===
Season	Male	Female	Coach	Events
2014–15	Markus Schagerl	Anna Weghuber	Manfred Weghuber	WMDCC 2015 (26th)
2017–18	Markus Schagerl	Anna Weghuber	Uli Kapp, Philipp Gahleitner	WMDCC 2018 (32nd)

== Record as a coach of national teams ==
Year	Tournament, event	National team	Place
2006	2006 European Junior Curling Challenge	Austria (junior men)	9
2006	2006 European Junior Curling Challenge	Austria (junior women)	6
