= 2014 World Junior Curling Championships =

- Host city: Flims, Switzerland
- Arena: Waldhaus Arena
- Dates: February 26 – March 5
- Men's winner: Switzerland
- Curling club: CBA Bern, Bern
- Skip: Yannick Schwaller
- Fourth: Reto Keller
- Second: Romano Meier
- Lead: Patrick Witschonke
- Alternate: Michael Probst
- Finalist: Scotland (Kyle Smith)
- Women's winner: Canada
- Curling club: Saville SC, Edmonton
- Skip: Kelsey Rocque
- Third: Keely Brown
- Second: Taylor McDonald
- Lead: Claire Tully
- Alternate: Alison Kotylak
- Finalist: South Korea (Kim Kyeong-ae)

The 2014 World Junior Curling Championships were held from February 26 to March 5 at the Waldhaus Arena in Flims, Switzerland.

== Men ==
=== Teams ===
The teams are listed as follows:

Country	Skip	Third	Second	Lead	Alternate
Austria	Sebastian Wunderer	Mathias Genner	Martin Reichel	Philipp Nothegger	Lukas Kirchmair
Canada	Braden Calvert	Kyle Kurz	Lucas Van Den Bosch	Brendan Wilson	Matt Dunstone
China	Shao Zhilin	Wang Jinbo	Ling Zhi	Liang Shuming	Zhang Tianyu
Italy	Amos Mosaner	Daniele Ferrazza	Sebastiano Arman	Roberto Arman	Marco Onnis
Norway	Eirik Mjøen	Markus Skogvold	Wilhelm Naess	Gaute Nepstad	Martin Sesaker
Russia	Sergey Glukhov	Artur Ali	Dmitrii Mironov	Timur Gadzhikhanov	Alexandr Kuzmin
Scotland	Kyle Smith	Thomas Muirhead	Kyle Waddell	Cammy Smith	Duncan Menzies
Sweden	Fredrik Nyman	Simon Granbom	Johannes Patz	Victor Martinsson	Max Bäck
Switzerland	Reto Keller (fourth)	Yannick Schwaller (skip)	Patrick Witschonke	Michael Probst	Romano Meier
United States	Jake Vukich	Evan McAuley	Luc Violette	Kyle Lorvick	Alex Fenson

=== Round-robin standings ===
Final Round Robin Standings

Key
Teams to Playoffs
Teams to Tiebreaker

Country	Skip	W	L
Norway	Eirik Mjøen	7	2
Scotland	Kyle Smith	6	3
Canada	Braden Calvert	6	3
Italy	Amos Mosaner	6	3
Switzerland	Yannick Schwaller	6	3
Sweden	Fredrik Nyman	5	4
Russia	Sergey Glukhov	4	5
Austria	Sebastian Wunderer	3	6
United States	Jake Vukich	2	7
China	Shao Zhilin	0	9

=== Round-robin results ===
==== Draw 1 ====
Wednesday, February 26, 12:00

Sheet A	1	2	3	4	5	6	7	8	9	10	Final
Russia (Glukhov)	1	0	0	0	2	0	0	2	0	3	8
Canada (Calvert) 🔨	0	0	2	1	0	1	0	0	2	0	6

Sheet B	1	2	3	4	5	6	7	8	9	10	Final
Scotland (Smith) 🔨	0	3	0	0	2	0	0	1	3	X	9
Austria (Wunderer)	1	0	1	0	0	2	0	0	0	X	4

Sheet C	1	2	3	4	5	6	7	8	9	10	Final
United States (Vukich)	0	0	1	0	0	0	1	0	0	X	2
Switzerland (Schwaller) 🔨	2	0	0	2	0	0	0	1	1	X	6

Sheet D	1	2	3	4	5	6	7	8	9	10	Final
Italy (Mosaner) 🔨	0	3	1	1	0	0	1	0	3	X	9
Sweden (Nyman)	0	0	0	0	1	0	0	2	0	X	3

Sheet E	1	2	3	4	5	6	7	8	9	10	Final
China (Shao) 🔨	0	1	0	0	1	0	1	0	1	X	4
Norway (Mjøen)	2	0	0	2	0	1	0	3	0	X	8

==== Draw 2 ====
Wednesday, February 26, 20:00

Sheet A	1	2	3	4	5	6	7	8	9	10	Final
Austria (Wunderer)	0	1	0	3	0	0	X	X	X	X	4
Italy (Mosaner) 🔨	5	0	3	0	3	1	X	X	X	X	12

Sheet B	1	2	3	4	5	6	7	8	9	10	Final
Canada (Calvert) 🔨	1	0	1	0	2	0	0	0	1	0	5
Sweden (Nyman)	0	2	0	2	0	0	0	0	0	2	6

Sheet C	1	2	3	4	5	6	7	8	9	10	Final
China (Shao) 🔨	0	0	0	0	1	0	0	2	X	X	3
Russia (Glukhov)	2	1	3	1	0	2	0	0	X	X	9

Sheet D	1	2	3	4	5	6	7	8	9	10	Final
Norway (Mjøen) 🔨	2	0	1	0	2	0	1	0	2	X	8
Switzerland (Schwaller)	0	1	0	1	0	1	0	1	0	X	4

Sheet E	1	2	3	4	5	6	7	8	9	10	Final
Scotland (Smith) 🔨	2	0	1	0	2	0	0	2	X	X	7
United States (Vukich)	0	0	0	1	0	0	1	0	X	X	2

==== Draw 3 ====
Thursday, February 27, 14:00

Sheet A	1	2	3	4	5	6	7	8	9	10	Final
Switzerland (Schwaller) 🔨	2	0	2	0	1	0	1	0	2	X	8
Scotland (Smith)	0	1	0	3	0	1	0	1	0	X	6

Sheet B	1	2	3	4	5	6	7	8	9	10	Final
Russia (Glukhov)	0	0	0	0	1	0	1	0	0	X	2
Norway (Mjøen) 🔨	1	0	2	0	0	0	0	1	0	X	4

Sheet C	1	2	3	4	5	6	7	8	9	10	Final
Canada (Calvert)	0	0	1	1	1	0	1	2	0	2	8
Italy (Mosaner) 🔨	0	3	0	0	0	2	0	0	2	0	7

Sheet D	1	2	3	4	5	6	7	8	9	10	Final
United States (Vukich)	0	1	0	2	0	2	0	0	1	X	6
China (Shao) 🔨	0	0	1	0	2	0	1	0	0	X	4

Sheet E	1	2	3	4	5	6	7	8	9	10	Final
Austria (Wunderer) 🔨	0	0	2	0	1	2	0	1	0	1	7
Sweden (Nyman)	1	1	0	1	0	0	2	0	0	0	5

==== Draw 4 ====
Friday, February 28, 8:00

Sheet A	1	2	3	4	5	6	7	8	9	10	Final
Sweden (Nyman) 🔨	1	0	1	0	1	2	4	X	X	X	9
China (Shao)	0	1	0	1	0	0	0	X	X	X	2

Sheet B	1	2	3	4	5	6	7	8	9	10	Final
United States (Vukich) 🔨	0	1	0	2	1	2	0	1	0	X	7
Italy (Mosaner)	0	0	2	0	0	0	1	0	1	X	4

Sheet C	1	2	3	4	5	6	7	8	9	10	11	Final
Norway (Mjøen) 🔨	0	0	1	0	0	3	0	2	0	0	1	7
Austria (Wunderer)	0	0	0	0	1	0	3	0	1	1	0	6

Sheet D	1	2	3	4	5	6	7	8	9	10	Final
Switzerland (Schwaller)	0	2	0	2	0	0	0	1	1	2	8
Russia (Glukhov) 🔨	2	0	2	0	0	1	2	0	0	0	7

Sheet E	1	2	3	4	5	6	7	8	9	10	Final
Canada (Calvert)	0	0	0	1	0	2	0	2	0	X	5
Scotland (Smith) 🔨	1	1	2	0	2	0	1	0	3	X	10

==== Draw 5 ====
Friday, February 28, 16:00

Sheet A	1	2	3	4	5	6	7	8	9	10	Final
United States (Vukich)	0	0	0	2	0	0	2	0	1	0	5
Austria (Wunderer) 🔨	1	0	1	0	0	2	0	1	0	1	6

Sheet B	1	2	3	4	5	6	7	8	9	10	Final
China (Shao) 🔨	1	0	1	0	1	0	0	1	0	X	4
Canada (Calvert)	0	2	0	2	0	0	3	0	1	X	8

Sheet C	1	2	3	4	5	6	7	8	9	10	Final
Russia (Glukhov)	1	0	0	1	0	0	1	0	0	X	3
Sweden (Nyman) 🔨	0	2	1	0	1	1	0	1	2	X	8

Sheet D	1	2	3	4	5	6	7	8	9	10	Final
Scotland (Smith)	2	0	1	2	0	0	0	0	1	0	6
Norway (Mjøen) 🔨	0	2	0	0	0	0	3	1	0	1	7

Sheet E	1	2	3	4	5	6	7	8	9	10	Final
Italy (Mosaner)	0	0	2	0	2	0	1	2	0	1	8
Switzerland (Schwaller) 🔨	0	2	0	3	0	1	0	0	0	0	6

==== Draw 6 ====
Saturday, March 1, 9:00

Sheet A	1	2	3	4	5	6	7	8	9	10	Final
China (Shao) 🔨	0	1	0	2	0	1	0	0	0	X	4
Switzerland (Schwaller)	1	0	1	0	2	0	1	1	1	X	7

Sheet B	1	2	3	4	5	6	7	8	9	10	Final
Austria (Wunderer)	0	1	0	0	1	0	2	0	X	X	4
Russia (Glukhov) 🔨	2	0	2	1	0	3	0	1	X	X	9

Sheet C	1	2	3	4	5	6	7	8	9	10	Final
Italy (Mosaner) 🔨	1	0	1	0	0	1	0	0	2	0	5
Scotland (Smith)	0	2	0	1	1	0	1	0	0	1	6

Sheet D	1	2	3	4	5	6	7	8	9	10	11	Final
Sweden (Nyman) 🔨	2	0	0	1	1	0	1	0	2	0	1	8
United States (Vukich)	0	1	2	0	0	1	0	1	0	2	0	7

Sheet E	1	2	3	4	5	6	7	8	9	10	Final
Norway (Mjøen) 🔨	0	1	0	1	1	0	0	1	0	1	5
Canada (Calvert)	0	0	0	0	0	2	2	0	2	0	6

==== Draw 7 ====
Saturday, March 1, 19:00

Sheet A	1	2	3	4	5	6	7	8	9	10	Final
Scotland (Smith) 🔨	2	0	0	0	1	0	1	2	0	0	6
Sweden (Nyman)	0	0	0	2	0	2	0	0	2	3	9

Sheet B	1	2	3	4	5	6	7	8	9	10	Final
Norway (Mjøen)	0	0	3	1	0	1	0	3	0	1	9
United States (Vukich) 🔨	0	3	0	0	1	0	2	0	2	0	8

Sheet C	1	2	3	4	5	6	7	8	9	10	Final
Switzerland (Schwaller)	0	0	1	0	0	1	0	0	X	X	2
Canada (Calvert) 🔨	0	2	0	2	0	0	2	1	X	X	7

Sheet D	1	2	3	4	5	6	7	8	9	10	Final
China (Shao)	0	1	0	1	0	2	0	0	1	2	7
Austria (Wunderer) 🔨	3	0	1	0	1	0	3	0	0	0	8

Sheet E	1	2	3	4	5	6	7	8	9	10	11	12	Final
Russia (Glukhov) 🔨	1	1	1	0	1	0	1	0	1	0	0	0	6
Italy (Mosaner)	0	0	0	1	0	2	0	1	0	2	0	2	8

==== Draw 8 ====
Sunday, March 2, 12:00

Sheet A	1	2	3	4	5	6	7	8	9	10	Final
Canada (Calvert) 🔨	3	0	1	0	3	1	X	X	X	X	8
United States (Vukich)	0	0	0	1	0	0	X	X	X	X	1

Sheet B	1	2	3	4	5	6	7	8	9	10	Final
Italy (Mosaner) 🔨	2	1	1	0	3	1	X	X	X	X	8
China (Shao)	0	0	0	1	0	0	X	X	X	X	1

Sheet C	1	2	3	4	5	6	7	8	9	10	Final
Sweden (Nyman) 🔨	2	0	1	0	2	0	3	0	1	0	9
Norway (Mjøen)	0	3	0	1	0	1	0	2	0	3	10

Sheet D	1	2	3	4	5	6	7	8	9	10	Final
Russia (Glukhov)	0	0	0	2	0	1	0	0	0	X	3
Scotland (Smith) 🔨	1	1	1	0	1	0	0	0	1	X	5

Sheet E	1	2	3	4	5	6	7	8	9	10	Final
Switzerland (Schwaller) 🔨	2	0	2	0	0	3	3	X	X	X	10
Austria (Wunderer)	0	1	0	0	1	0	0	X	X	X	2

==== Draw 9 ====
Sunday, March 2, 20:00

Sheet A	1	2	3	4	5	6	7	8	9	10	Final
Italy (Mosaner)	0	1	0	1	0	0	1	0	0	1	4
Norway (Mjøen) 🔨	0	0	0	0	2	0	0	1	0	0	3

Sheet B	1	2	3	4	5	6	7	8	9	10	Final
Sweden (Nyman) 🔨	1	0	2	0	0	2	0	1	0	0	6
Switzerland (Schwaller)	0	1	0	1	2	0	2	0	4	1	11

Sheet C	1	2	3	4	5	6	7	8	9	10	Final
Scotland (Smith) 🔨	0	1	0	3	0	0	5	X	X	X	9
China (Shao)	1	0	4	0	1	0	0	X	X	X	6

Sheet D	1	2	3	4	5	6	7	8	9	10	Final
Austria (Wunderer)	0	0	1	0	0	0	X	X	X	X	1
Canada (Calvert) 🔨	2	1	0	0	4	2	X	X	X	X	9

Sheet E	1	2	3	4	5	6	7	8	9	10	11	Final
United States (Vukich) 🔨	0	2	0	1	0	1	0	1	0	2	0	7
Russia (Glukhov)	1	0	0	0	2	0	3	0	1	0	1	8

=== Tiebreaker ===
Monday, March 3, 14:00

Team	1	2	3	4	5	6	7	8	9	10	Final
Italy (Mosaner) 🔨	1	0	0	0	1	0	0	0	1	0	3
Switzerland (Schwaller)	0	1	0	2	0	0	0	0	0	1	4

=== Playoffs ===
Page playoff system
1	Norway	5
2	Scotland	8
3	Canada	5
4	Switzerland	6

Semifinal
1	Norway	2
4	Switzerland	10

Final
2	Scotland	5
4	Switzerland	6

Bronze-medal game
1	Norway	7
3	Canada	5

==== 1 vs. 2 ====
Tuesday, March 4, 12:00

Sheet B	1	2	3	4	5	6	7	8	9	10	Final
Norway (Mjøen) 🔨	0	1	0	1	0	1	0	2	0	X	5
Scotland (Smith)	0	0	3	0	1	0	2	0	2	X	8

==== 3 vs. 4 ====
Tuesday, March 4, 12:00

Sheet A	1	2	3	4	5	6	7	8	9	10	11	Final
Canada (Calvert) 🔨	0	0	1	0	0	0	0	2	0	2	0	5
Switzerland (Schwaller)	0	0	0	2	0	1	0	0	2	0	1	6

==== Semifinal ====
Tuesday, March 4, 18:00

Sheet C	1	2	3	4	5	6	7	8	9	10	Final
Norway (Mjøen) 🔨	0	1	0	0	0	0	0	1	X	X	2
Switzerland (Schwaller)	0	0	2	0	4	1	3	0	X	X	10

==== Bronze-medal game ====
Wednesday, March 5, 13:00

Team	1	2	3	4	5	6	7	8	9	10	Final
Norway (Mjøen) 🔨	0	2	2	0	0	0	1	0	0	2	7
Canada (Calvert)	0	0	0	0	1	0	0	2	2	0	5

==== Final ====
Wednesday, March 5, 13:00

Team	1	2	3	4	5	6	7	8	9	10	Final
Scotland (Smith) 🔨	1	0	0	1	0	0	1	0	1	1	5
Switzerland (Schwaller)	0	2	1	0	2	1	0	0	0	0	6

== Women ==
=== Teams ===
The teams are listed as follows:

Country	Skip	Third	Second	Lead	Alternate
Canada	Kelsey Rocque	Keely Brown	Taylor McDonald	Claire Tully	Alison Kotylak
Czech Republic	Iveta Janatová (fourth)	Zuzana Hájková (skip)	Alžběta Baudyšová	Klára Svatoňová	Eliška Srnská
Denmark	Christine Svensen	Isabella Clemmensen	Julie Dall Høgh	Charlotte Clemmensen	Sara Rasmussen
Italy	Veronica Zappone	Elisa Charlotte Patono	Martina Bronsino	Arianna Losano	Angela Romei
Russia	Julia Portunova (fourth)	Alina Kovaleva (skip)	Uliana Vasilyeva	Anastasiia Bryzgalova	Anastasia Moskaleva
Scotland	Gina Aitken	Naomi Brown	Rowena Kerr	Rachel Hannen	Mhairi Baird
South Korea	Kim Kyeong-ae	Kim Seon-yeong	Kim Ji-hyeon	Oh Eun-jin	Koo Young-eun
Sweden	Isabella Wranå	Jennie Wåhlin	Fanny Sjöberg	Elin Lövstrand	Almida de Val
Switzerland	Briar Hürlimann (fourth)	Corina Mani (skip)	Rahel Thoma	Tamara Michel	Elena Stern
United States	Cory Christensen	Mackenzie Lank	Anna Bauman	Anna Hopkins	Tina Persinger

=== Round-robin standings ===
Final Round Robin Standings

Key
Teams to Playoffs
Teams to Tiebreaker

Country	Skip	W	L
South Korea	Kim Kyeong-ae	7	2
Canada	Kelsey Rocque	7	2
Russia	Alina Kovaleva	6	3
Switzerland	Corina Mani	6	3
Sweden	Isabella Wranå	6	3
United States	Cory Christensen	5	4
Czech Republic	Zuzana Hájková	3	6
Scotland	Gina Aitken	3	6
Italy	Veronica Zappone	2	7
Denmark	Christine Svensen	0	9

=== Round-robin results ===
==== Draw 1 ====
Wednesday, February 26, 8:00

Sheet A	1	2	3	4	5	6	7	8	9	10	11	Final
Scotland (Aitken) 🔨	0	0	1	0	3	0	0	1	1	1	0	7
South Korea (Kim)	1	0	0	2	0	4	0	0	0	0	3	10

Sheet B	1	2	3	4	5	6	7	8	9	10	11	Final
Canada (Rocque)	1	1	0	0	0	0	1	2	0	1	1	7
Czech Republic (Hájková) 🔨	0	0	0	1	0	4	0	0	1	0	0	6

Sheet C	1	2	3	4	5	6	7	8	9	10	Final
Italy (Zappone)	0	0	1	0	2	0	1	0	1	X	5
Russia (Kovaleva) 🔨	3	1	0	2	0	1	0	2	0	X	9

Sheet D	1	2	3	4	5	6	7	8	9	10	11	Final
Switzerland (Mani) 🔨	0	0	3	0	0	1	0	1	1	0	1	7
United States (Christensen)	0	0	0	3	1	0	0	0	0	2	0	6

Sheet E	1	2	3	4	5	6	7	8	9	10	Final
Denmark (Svensen) 🔨	0	0	3	0	0	0	1	0	1	0	5
Sweden (Wranå)	0	0	0	2	0	1	0	2	0	1	6

==== Draw 2 ====
Wednesday, February 26, 16:00

Sheet A	1	2	3	4	5	6	7	8	9	10	Final
Czech Republic (Hájková)	0	0	2	0	0	2	0	0	2	X	6
Switzerland (Mani) 🔨	3	1	0	1	1	0	1	2	0	X	9

Sheet B	1	2	3	4	5	6	7	8	9	10	Final
South Korea (Kim)	0	1	0	1	0	1	0	X	X	X	3
United States (Christensen) 🔨	3	0	3	0	4	0	6	X	X	X	16

Sheet C	1	2	3	4	5	6	7	8	9	10	Final
Denmark (Svensen)	1	0	3	0	1	0	0	2	0	0	7
Scotland (Aitken) 🔨	0	1	0	2	0	0	2	0	2	1	8

Sheet D	1	2	3	4	5	6	7	8	9	10	Final
Sweden (Wranå) 🔨	0	1	0	0	0	1	0	2	0	X	4
Russia (Kovaleva)	1	0	0	1	1	0	2	0	1	X	6

Sheet E	1	2	3	4	5	6	7	8	9	10	Final
Canada (Rocque) 🔨	1	0	0	2	0	0	0	3	0	2	8
Italy (Zappone)	0	2	1	0	1	0	1	0	1	0	6

==== Draw 3 ====
Thursday, February 27, 9:00

Sheet A	1	2	3	4	5	6	7	8	9	10	Final
Russia (Kovaleva)	0	0	0	0	3	0	1	1	0	1	6
Canada (Rocque) 🔨	1	0	0	0	0	2	0	0	1	0	4

Sheet B	1	2	3	4	5	6	7	8	9	10	Final
Scotland (Aitken) 🔨	1	0	0	0	1	0	0	1	0	0	3
Sweden (Wranå)	0	0	2	0	0	1	0	0	0	1	4

Sheet C	1	2	3	4	5	6	7	8	9	10	11	Final
South Korea (Kim)	0	1	0	0	2	0	2	0	2	0	1	8
Switzerland (Mani) 🔨	2	0	1	0	0	2	0	1	0	1	0	7

Sheet D	1	2	3	4	5	6	7	8	9	10	Final
Italy (Zappone)	1	0	2	1	0	0	2	1	0	1	8
Denmark (Svensen) 🔨	0	2	0	0	1	1	0	0	2	0	6

Sheet E	1	2	3	4	5	6	7	8	9	10	Final
Czech Republic (Hájková) 🔨	2	0	0	1	0	1	0	0	0	X	4
United States (Christensen)	0	0	2	0	2	0	0	2	3	X	9

==== Draw 4 ====
Thursday, February 27, 19:00

Sheet A	1	2	3	4	5	6	7	8	9	10	Final
United States (Christensen) 🔨	0	2	0	0	2	1	3	X	X	X	8
Denmark (Svensen)	1	0	0	1	0	0	0	X	X	X	2

Sheet B	1	2	3	4	5	6	7	8	9	10	Final
Italy (Zappone)	0	0	0	0	1	2	0	0	1	0	4
Switzerland (Mani) 🔨	0	0	0	2	0	0	2	2	0	1	7

Sheet C	1	2	3	4	5	6	7	8	9	10	Final
Sweden (Wranå)	0	0	0	0	0	2	0	0	X	X	2
Czech Republic (Hájková) 🔨	1	0	0	1	3	0	1	1	X	X	7

Sheet D	1	2	3	4	5	6	7	8	9	10	11	Final
Russia (Kovaleva) 🔨	0	0	1	0	1	0	0	2	0	1	2	7
Scotland (Aitken)	0	0	0	2	0	1	2	0	0	0	0	5

Sheet E	1	2	3	4	5	6	7	8	9	10	11	Final
South Korea (Kim) 🔨	0	1	0	2	0	0	1	0	2	0	2	8
Canada (Rocque)	0	0	2	0	1	1	0	1	0	1	0	6

==== Draw 5 ====
Friday, February 28, 12:00

Sheet A	1	2	3	4	5	6	7	8	9	10	Final
Italy (Zappone)	0	0	1	0	0	1	1	0	1	2	6
Czech Republic (Hájková) 🔨	0	1	0	0	2	0	0	1	0	0	4

Sheet B	1	2	3	4	5	6	7	8	9	10	Final
Denmark (Svensen)	0	2	0	1	0	1	0	0	1	0	5
South Korea (Kim) 🔨	2	0	1	0	2	0	1	2	0	1	9

Sheet C	1	2	3	4	5	6	7	8	9	10	Final
Scotland (Aitken)	1	0	1	0	1	0	2	0	2	X	7
United States (Christensen) 🔨	0	1	0	1	0	1	0	1	0	X	4

Sheet D	1	2	3	4	5	6	7	8	9	10	Final
Canada (Rocque)	0	1	0	2	1	0	0	4	X	X	8
Sweden (Wranå) 🔨	0	0	2	0	0	0	1	0	X	X	3

Sheet E	1	2	3	4	5	6	7	8	9	10	11	Final
Switzerland (Mani) 🔨	1	0	1	1	0	3	0	0	2	0	1	9
Russia (Kovaleva)	0	2	0	0	2	0	2	0	0	2	0	8

==== Draw 6 ====
Friday, February 28, 20:00

Sheet A	1	2	3	4	5	6	7	8	9	10	Final
Denmark (Svensen) 🔨	1	0	0	1	0	1	0	1	0	X	4
Russia (Kovaleva)	0	1	1	0	2	0	3	0	3	X	10

Sheet B	1	2	3	4	5	6	7	8	9	10	11	Final
Czech Republic (Hájková)	0	1	0	1	1	0	2	0	1	0	1	7
Scotland (Aitken) 🔨	0	0	3	0	0	1	0	1	0	1	0	6

Sheet C	1	2	3	4	5	6	7	8	9	10	Final
Switzerland (Mani)	0	1	0	0	0	2	0	2	0	X	5
Canada (Rocque) 🔨	2	0	2	1	1	0	1	0	1	X	8

Sheet D	1	2	3	4	5	6	7	8	9	10	Final
United States (Christensen)	0	2	1	0	5	0	0	3	X	X	11
Italy (Zappone) 🔨	0	0	0	1	0	2	1	0	X	X	4

Sheet E	1	2	3	4	5	6	7	8	9	10	11	Final
Sweden (Wranå)	0	1	0	1	0	2	0	0	0	1	1	6
South Korea (Kim) 🔨	1	0	1	0	0	0	2	1	0	0	0	5

==== Draw 7 ====
Saturday, March 1, 14:00

Sheet A	1	2	3	4	5	6	7	8	9	10	Final
Canada (Rocque) 🔨	0	2	0	1	0	3	0	0	2	X	8
United States (Christensen)	0	0	1	0	1	0	1	1	0	X	4

Sheet B	1	2	3	4	5	6	7	8	9	10	Final
Sweden (Wranå)	0	1	0	1	1	1	2	2	X	X	8
Italy (Zappone) 🔨	0	0	1	0	0	0	0	0	X	X	1

Sheet C	1	2	3	4	5	6	7	8	9	10	11	Final
Russia (Kovaleva)	0	0	1	1	0	0	0	2	0	1	0	5
South Korea (Kim) 🔨	0	1	0	0	1	1	1	0	1	0	2	7

Sheet D	1	2	3	4	5	6	7	8	9	10	Final
Denmark (Svensen) 🔨	0	1	0	1	0	1	1	2	0	1	7
Czech Republic (Hájková)	2	0	1	0	2	0	0	0	3	0	8

Sheet E	1	2	3	4	5	6	7	8	9	10	Final
Scotland (Aitken)	0	0	0	1	0	0	0	0	2	0	2
Switzerland (Mani) 🔨	0	0	1	0	0	0	0	0	0	2	3

==== Draw 8 ====
Sunday, March 2, 8:00

Sheet A	1	2	3	4	5	6	7	8	9	10	Final
South Korea (Kim) 🔨	0	1	0	2	0	1	2	0	0	1	7
Italy (Zappone)	0	0	2	0	1	0	0	1	1	0	5

Sheet B	1	2	3	4	5	6	7	8	9	10	Final
Switzerland (Mani)	1	0	3	0	1	0	3	1	0	1	10
Denmark (Svensen) 🔨	0	1	0	2	0	2	0	0	3	0	8

Sheet C	1	2	3	4	5	6	7	8	9	10	Final
United States (Christensen) 🔨	1	0	0	0	0	2	0	0	0	X	3
Sweden (Wranå)	0	0	2	0	1	0	4	1	1	X	9

Sheet D	1	2	3	4	5	6	7	8	9	10	Final
Scotland (Aitken) 🔨	0	1	1	0	1	0	1	0	2	0	6
Canada (Rocque)	0	0	0	2	0	3	0	1	0	1	7

Sheet E	1	2	3	4	5	6	7	8	9	10	Final
Russia (Kovaleva) 🔨	0	1	2	0	2	2	0	0	X	X	7
Czech Republic (Hájková)	0	0	0	1	0	0	0	1	X	X	2

==== Draw 9 ====
Sunday, March 2, 16:00

Sheet A	1	2	3	4	5	6	7	8	9	10	Final
Switzerland (Mani)	0	0	2	0	0	1	0	1	1	1	6
Sweden (Wranå) 🔨	0	2	0	1	2	0	2	0	0	0	7

Sheet B	1	2	3	4	5	6	7	8	9	10	Final
United States (Christensen) 🔨	2	0	1	0	1	0	1	0	2	1	8
Russia (Kovaleva)	0	3	0	2	0	1	0	1	0	0	7

Sheet C	1	2	3	4	5	6	7	8	9	10	Final
Canada (Rocque)	3	0	0	1	0	1	0	7	X	X	12
Denmark (Svensen) 🔨	0	1	2	0	1	0	1	0	X	X	5

Sheet D	1	2	3	4	5	6	7	8	9	10	Final
Czech Republic (Hájková)	0	0	1	0	0	2	0	0	3	0	6
South Korea (Kim) 🔨	1	1	0	0	2	0	3	0	0	1	8

Sheet E	1	2	3	4	5	6	7	8	9	10	Final
Italy (Zappone) 🔨	0	0	1	0	1	0	3	0	2	0	7
Scotland (Aitken)	0	0	0	1	0	4	0	1	0	2	8

=== Tiebreaker ===
Monday, March 3, 14:00

Team	1	2	3	4	5	6	7	8	9	10	Final
Sweden (Wranå) 🔨	0	1	0	2	0	2	2	0	0	0	7
Switzerland (Mani)	0	0	1	0	2	0	0	1	1	1	6

=== Playoffs ===
Page playoff system
1	South Korea	6
2	Canada	7
3	Russia	4
4	Sweden	5

Semifinal
1	South Korea	7
4	Sweden	4

Final
2	Canada	6
1	South Korea	4

Bronze-medal game
4	Sweden	4
3	Russia	11

==== 1 vs. 2 ====
Tuesday, March 4, 12:00

Sheet B	1	2	3	4	5	6	7	8	9	10	Final
South Korea (Kim) 🔨	0	0	0	1	0	2	0	1	2	0	6
Canada (Rocque)	0	0	1	0	2	0	2	0	0	2	7

==== 3 vs. 4 ====
Tuesday, March 4, 12:00

Sheet C	1	2	3	4	5	6	7	8	9	10	11	Final
Russia (Kovaleva) 🔨	0	1	0	0	0	0	0	2	0	1	0	4
Sweden (Wranå)	0	0	1	0	0	1	1	0	1	0	1	5

==== Semifinal ====
Tuesday, March 4, 18:00

Sheet A	1	2	3	4	5	6	7	8	9	10	Final
South Korea (Kim) 🔨	0	3	0	0	1	1	0	0	0	2	7
Sweden (Wranå)	0	0	1	1	0	0	0	2	0	0	4

==== Bronze-medal game ====
Wednesday, March 5, 9:00

Team	1	2	3	4	5	6	7	8	9	10	Final
Sweden (Wranå) 🔨	0	2	0	1	0	0	1	0	X	X	4
Russia (Kovaleva)	0	0	5	0	2	1	0	3	X	X	11

==== Final ====
Wednesday, March 5, 9:00

Team	1	2	3	4	5	6	7	8	9	10	Final
Canada (Rocque) 🔨	1	0	0	0	1	0	2	2	0	X	6
South Korea (Kim)	0	1	0	1	0	1	0	0	1	X	4
