= Martin Reichel (curler) =

Austrian curler

- Curler ♂
- Born: 31 May 1994 (age 32); Kitzbühel, Austria

Team
- Curling club: Kitzbühel CC, Kitzbühel
- Skip: Mathias Genner
- Third: Jonas Backofen
- Second: Matthäus Hofer
- Lead: Martin Reichel
- Alternate: Johann Karg
- Mixed doubles partner: Hannah Augustin

Curling career
- Member Association: Austria
- World Championship: 1 (2025)
- European Championship: 3 (2024, 2025, 2026)
Medal record
Curling
Austrian Men's Championship
Gold medal – first place	2014 ?
Gold medal – first place	2015 Kitzbühel
Gold medal – first place	2016 Sankt Pölten
Gold medal – first place	2017 Linz
Gold medal – first place	2018 Kitzbühel
Gold medal – first place	2019 Traun
Gold medal – first place	2020 Kitzbühel
Gold medal – first place	2022 Kitzbühel
Silver medal – second place	2013 ?
Austrian Mixed Championship
Silver medal – second place	2011 Kitzbühel
Silver medal – second place	2020 Kitzbühel
Bronze medal – third place	2014 Kitzbühel
Bronze medal – third place	2015 Kitzbühel
Bronze medal – third place	2019 Kitzbühel
Austrian Mixed Doubles Championship
Gold medal – first place	2019 Kitzbühel
Gold medal – first place	2020 Kitzbühel
Gold medal – first place	2022 Kitzbühel
Bronze medal – third place	2019 Kitzbühel
European Junior Challenge
Gold medal – first place	2014 Lohja

Martin Reichel (born 31 May 1994 in Kitzbühel) is an Austrian male curler from Vienna.

At the national level, he is an eight-time Austrian men's champion curler and a three-time Austrian mixed doubles champion curler.

He competed on 2012 Winter Youth Olympics (finished 14th in mixed curling and 5th in mixed doubles).

== Teams and events ==
=== Men's ===
Season	Skip	Third	Second	Lead	Alternate	Coach	Events
2009–10	Sebastian Wunderer (fourth)	Markus Pirker (skip)	Mathias Genner	Philipp Nothegger	Martin Reichel		EJCC 2010 (12th)
2010–11	Sebastian Wunderer	Mathias Genner	Lukas Kirchmair	Martin Reichel	Christoph Steiner	Katja Weisser	EJCC 2011 (10th)
2011–12	Sebastian Wunderer	Mathias Genner	Martin Reichel	Lukas Kirchmair	Philipp Nothegger	Katja Weisser	EJCC 2012 (9th)
2012–13	Sebastian Wunderer	Mathias Genner	Martin Reichel	Lukas Kirchmair	Philipp Nothegger	Christian Roth	EJCC 2013 (6th)
2012–13	Andreas Unterberger	Mathias Genner	Hubert Gründhammer	Günter Huber	Martin Reichel		AMCC 2013 (silver)
2013–14	Sebastian Wunderer	Mathias Genner	Martin Reichel	Lukas Kirchmair	Philipp Nothegger	Christian Roth	EJCC 2014 (gold)
2013–14	Sebastian Wunderer	Mathias Genner	Martin Reichel	Philipp Nothegger	Lukas Kirchmair	Christian Roth	WJCC 2014 (8th)
2013–14	Sebastian Wunderer	Mathias Genner	Martin Reichel	Philipp Nothegger	Lukas Kirchmair		AMCC 2014 (gold)
2014–15	Sebastian Wunderer	Mathias Genner	Martin Reichel	Markus Forejtek	Felix Purzner	Christian Roth	ECC-B 2014 (16th)
2014–15	Sebastian Wunderer	Mathias Genner	Martin Reichel	Lukas Kirchmair	Philipp Nothegger	Christian Roth	EJCC 2015 2015 (4th)
2014–15	Sebastian Wunderer	Mathias Genner	Martin Reichel	Philipp Nothegger	Lukas Kirchmair		AMCC 2015 (gold)
2015–16	Sebastian Wunderer	Mathias Genner	Martin Reichel	Lukas Kirchmair	Philipp Nothegger	Christian Roth	ECC-B 2015 (12th)
2015–16	Sebastian Wunderer	Mathias Genner	Martin Reichel	Philipp Nothegger	Lukas Kirchmair		AMCC 2016 (gold)
2016–17	Sebastian Wunderer	Mathias Genner	Martin Reichel	Philipp Nothegger	Markus Forejtek	Uli Kapp	ECC-B 2016 (8th)
2016–17	Sebastian Wunderer	Mathias Genner	Martin Reichel	Philipp Nothegger	Lukas Kirchmair		AMCC 2017 (gold)
2017–18	Sebastian Wunderer	Mathias Genner	Martin Reichel	Philipp Nothegger	Markus Forejtek	Uli Kapp	ECC-B 2017 (9th)
2017–18	Sebastian Wunderer	Mathias Genner	Martin Reichel	Philipp Nothegger	Lukas Kirchmair		AMCC 2018 (gold)
2018–19	Sebastian Wunderer	Mathias Genner	Martin Reichel	Lukas Kirchmair	Philipp Nothegger	Björn Schröder	ECC-B 2018 (18th)
2018–19	Sebastian Wunderer	Mathias Genner	Martin Reichel	Philipp Nothegger	Lukas Kirchmair		AMCC 2019 (gold)
2019–20	Sebastian Wunderer	Martin Reichel	Martin Seiwald	Florian Mavec	Jonas Backofen	Björn Schröder	ECC-B 2019 (21st)
2019–20	Sebastian Wunderer	Mathias Genner	Martin Reichel	Lukas Kirchmair	Philipp Nothegger		AMCC 2020 (gold)
2021–22	Mathias Genner	Jonas Backofen	Martin Reichel	Lukas Kirchmair	Matthäus Hofer	Björn Schröder, Andreas Winkler	ECC-B 2021 (15th)
2021–22	Mathias Genner	Jonas Backofen	Martin Reichel	Lukas Kirchmair			AMCC 2022 (gold)
2022–23	Mathias Genner	Jonas Backofen	Martin Reichel	Florian Mavec	Philipp Nothegger	Björn Schröder, Andreas Winkler	ECC-B 2022 (17th)
2023–24	Mathias Genner	Jonas Backofen	Martin Reichel	Florian Mavec	Moritz Jöchl	Björn Schröder, Daniela Jentsch	ECC-B 2023 (12th)
2024–25	Mathias Genner	Jonas Backofen	Martin Reichel	Florian Mavec	Johann Karg	Björn Schröder	ECC 2024 (7th)
2024–25	Mathias Genner	Jonas Backofen	Martin Reichel	Florian Mavec	Matthäus Hofer	Brian Chick	WCC 2025 (12th)

=== Mixed ===
Season	Skip	Third	Second	Lead	Alternate	Coach	Events
2010–11	Karina Toth	Sebastian Wunderer	Constanze Ocker	Mathias Genner	Martin Reichel		AmxCC 2011 (silver)
2011–12	Mathias Genner	Camilla Schnabel	Martin Reichel	Irena Brettbacher		Katja Schweizer	WYOG 2012 (14th)
2013–14	Martin Reichel	Andrea Purzner	Felix Purzner	Marijke Reitsma			AmxCC 2014 (bronze)
2014–15	Martin Reichel	Andrea Purzner	Felix Purzner	Marijke Reitsma			AmxCC 2015 (bronze)
2015–16	Karina Toth	Mathias Genner	Constanze Ocker	Martin Reichel		Uli Kapp	WMxCC 2015 (25th)
2018–19	Lukas Kirchmair	Chiara Puchinger	Martin Reichel	Iris Yudan			AmxCC 2019 (bronze)
2019–20	Karina Toth	Sebastian Wunderer	Constanze Ocker	Martin Reichel			AmxCC 2020 (silver)

=== Mixed doubles ===
Season	Female	Male	Coach	Events
2011–12	(Canada) Corryn Brown	(Austria) Martin Reichel	Katja Schweizer	WYOG 2012 (5th)
2015–16	Marijke Reitsma	Martin Reichel		AMDCC 2016 (bronze)
2018–19	Hannah Augustin	Martin Reichel	Björn Schröder (WMDCC)	AMDCC 2019 (gold); WMDCC 2019 (23rd)
2019–20	Hannah Augustin	Martin Reichel	Björn Schröder (WMDQE)	WMDQE 2019 (5th); AMDCC 2020 (gold)
2020–21	Hannah Augustin	Martin Reichel		
2021–22	Hannah Augustin	Martin Reichel		AMDCC 2022 (gold)
2022–23	Hannah Augustin	Martin Reichel	Björn Schröder	WMDCC 2023 (17th)

== Personal life ==
As of 2025, he is a scientific researcher. He started curling in 2005 at the age of 11.
