= Sebastian Wunderer =

Austrian curler

- Curler ♂
- Born: 29 October 1993 (age 33); Kitzbühel

Team
- Curling club: Kitzbühel CC, Kitzbühel
- Mixed doubles partner: Karina Toth

Curling career
- Member Association: Austria
- World Mixed Doubles Championship: 1 (2016)
- European Championship: 7 (2013, 2014, 2015, 2016, 2017, 2018, 2019)
- Other appearances: European Mixed Championship: 3 (2012, 2013, 2014), World Junior Championships: 1 (2014), European Junior Challenge: 5 (2010, 2011, 2012, 2013, 2014, 2015)

Sebastian Wunderer (born 29 October 1993 in Kitzbühel) is an Austrian male curler.

At the national level, he is seven-time Austrian men's champion curler, five-time Austrian mixed champion, and a one-time Austrian mixed doubles champion curler.

== Teams ==
=== Men's ===
Season	Skip	Third	Second	Lead	Alternate	Coach	Events
2009–10	Sebastian Wunderer (fourth)	Markus Pirker (skip)	Mathias Genner	Philipp Nothegger	Martin Reichel		EJCC 2010 (12th)
2010–11	Sebastian Wunderer	Mathias Genner	Lukas Kirchmair	Martin Reichel	Christoph Steiner	Katja Weisser	EJCC 2011 (10th)
2011–12	Sebastian Wunderer	Mathias Genner	Martin Reichel	Lukas Kirchmair	Philipp Nothegger	Katja Weisser	EJCC 2012 (9th)
2012–13	Sebastian Wunderer	Mathias Genner	Martin Reichel	Lukas Kirchmair	Philipp Nothegger	Christian Roth	EJCC 2013 (6th)
2013–14	Markus Forejtek	Martin Egretzberger	Marcus Schmitt	Felix Purzner	Sebastian Wunderer	Christian Roth	ECC 2013 (20th)
2013–14	Sebastian Wunderer	Mathias Genner	Martin Reichel	Lukas Kirchmair	Philipp Nothegger	Christian Roth	EJCC 2014 (gold)
2013–14	Sebastian Wunderer	Mathias Genner	Martin Reichel	Philipp Nothegger	Lukas Kirchmair	Christian Roth	WJCC 2014 (8th)
2014–15	Sebastian Wunderer	Mathias Genner	Martin Reichel	Markus Forejtek	Felix Purzner	Christian Roth	ECC 2014 (16th)
2014–15	Sebastian Wunderer	Mathias Genner	Martin Reichel	Lukas Kirchmair	Philipp Nothegger	Christian Roth	EJCC 2015 2015 (4th)
2015–16	Sebastian Wunderer	Mathias Genner	Martin Reichel	Lukas Kirchmair	Philipp Nothegger	Christian Roth	ECC 2015 (12th)
2016–17	Sebastian Wunderer	Mathias Genner	Martin Reichel	Philipp Nothegger	Markus Forejtek	Uli Kapp	ECC 2016 (8th)
2017–18	Sebastian Wunderer	Mathias Genner	Martin Reichel	Philipp Nothegger	Markus Forejtek	Uli Kapp	ECC 2017 (9th)
2018–19	Sebastian Wunderer	Mathias Genner	Martin Reichel	Lukas Kirchmair	Philipp Nothegger	Björn Schröder	ECC 2018 (18th)
2019–20	Sebastian Wunderer	Martin Reichel	Martin Seiwald	Florian Mavec	Jonas Backofen	Björn Schröder	ECC 2019 (21st)

=== Mixed ===
Season	Skip	Third	Second	Lead	Events
2012–13	Karina Toth	Sebastian Wunderer	Constanze Hummelt	Mathias Genner	EmxCC 2012 (4th)
2013–14	Sebastian Wunderer	Constanze Hummelt	Mathias Genner	Andrea Höfler	EmxCC 2013 (13th)
2014–15	Sebastian Wunderer (fourth)	Karina Toth (skip)	Mathias Genner	Andrea Höfler	EmxCC 2014 (13th)

=== Mixed doubles ===
Season	Male	Female	Coach	Events
2015–16	Sebastian Wunderer	Karina Toth	Uli Kapp	WMDCC 2016 (11th)
