= Austrian Mixed Doubles Curling Championship =

National championship of mixed doubles curling

The Austrian Mixed Doubles Curling Championship (German: ÖSTM Mixed Doubles) is the national championship of mixed doubles curling (one man and one woman) in Austria. It has been held annually since the 2008–2009 season. The championships are organized by the Austrian Curling Association (German: Österreichischer Curling Verband).

== List of champions and medallists ==
Team line-ups in order: female, male.

Season, dates	Host city, arena	Champion	Runner-up	Bronze	Placement at Worlds
2008—09; 28—31 August	Kitzbühel, Sportpark	KCC 1 Karina Toth / Andreas Unterberger	KCC 2 Alexandra Bruckmiller / Florian Huber	CC Traun 1 Jasmin Seidl / Manuel Seidl	21
2009—10	championship not held				15
2010—11; 10—12 September	Kitzbühel, Sportpark	CFÖ 3 Sonja Peichl / Thomas Peichl	CFÖ 2 Tina Sauerstein / Markus Forejtek	VCC 1 Eva Zepeski / ?? Marx	21
2011—12; 9—11 September	Kitzbühel, Sportpark	KCC 1 Claudia Toth / Christian Roth	CFÖ 2 Tina Sauerstein / Markus Forejtek	CFÖ 3 Traudi Koudelka / Marcus Schmitt	3rd place, bronze medalist(s)
2012—13; 9—11 November	Kitzbühel, Sportpark	KCC 3 Claudia Toth / Christian Roth	KCC 2 Karina Toth / Sebastian Wunderer	CFÖ 2 Tina Sauerstein / Markus Forejtek	8
2013—14; 7—10 November	Kitzbühel, Sportpark	KCC 3 Claudia Fischer / Christian Roth	KCC 2 Karina Toth / Sebastian Wunderer	CCT 1 Jasmin Seidl / Max Schagerl	8
2014—15; 26—28 October	Kitzbühel, Sportpark	KCC 3 Claudia Fischer / Christian Roth	KCC 2 Traudi Koudelka / Andreas Unterberger	OCC 2 Veronika Huber / Hartwig Zimmerl	26
2015—16; 15—17 January	Kitzbühel, Sportpark	KCC 2 Karina Toth / Sebastian Wunderer	KCC 1 Claudia Fischer / Christian Roth	KCC 4 Marijke Reitsma / Martin Reichel	11
2016—17; 13—15 January	?	DCCL; Anna Weghuber / Max Schagerl	KCC; Claudia Fischer / Christian Roth	OCC 2 Hannah Augustin / Gernot Higatzberger	24
2017—18; 8—10 December	Kitzbühel, Sportpark	KCC 1 Celine Moser / Andreas Unterberger	KCC 2 Sara Haidinger / Lukas Kirchmair	OCC 2 Hannah Augustin / Gernot Higatzberger	32
2018—19; 6—9 December	Kitzbühel, Sportpark	OCC; Hannah Augustin / Martin Reichel	KCC; Celine Moser / Andreas Unterberger	CC Steyr; Viktoria Scheiblehner / Gernot Higatzberger	23
2019—20; 30 January — 2 February	Kitzbühel, Sportpark	KCC 1 Hannah Augustin / Martin Reichel	KCC 3 Marijke Reitsma / Martin Seiwald	KCC 4 Karina Toth / Sebastian Wunderer	—

"KCC" — Kitzbühel Curling Club

== See also ==
- Austrian Men's Curling Championship
- Austrian Women's Curling Championship
- Austrian Mixed Curling Championship
- Austrian Junior Curling Championships
