= Claudia Fischer =

Austrian curler

- Skip (formerly) ♀
- Born: Claudia Toth; May 24, 1981 (age 45); Austria

Team
- Mixed doubles partner: Christian Roth

Curling career
- Member Association: Austria
- World Mixed Doubles Championship: 2012, 2013, 2014
- European Championship: 2004, 2005, 2006, 2007

Claudia Fischer (born 24 May 1981 as Claudia Toth) was the Austrian national women's curling team skip, or captain, from 2004 to 2007.

She has played in four European Championships, skipping her Austrian team to an 11th-place finish in 2004, 9th place in 2005, 11th place in 2006 and 9th place in 2007.

Since then, Fischer has played in several international mixed events, including winning a bronze medal at the 2012 World Mixed Doubles Curling Championship with Christian Roth. Fischer and Roth represented Austria at the 2013 and 2014 Mixed Doubles World Championships as well, finishing 8th place on both occasions.

== Personal life ==
Her younger sister Karina Toth is also a curler, they remained teammates for many years.

She attended the Bundesgymnasium/Bundesoberstufenrealgymnasium St. Johann in Tirol, Austria, from 1991 to 1999.

In 2005, she posed nude in a calendar to promote women's curling.

== See also ==
- Ana Arce
- Daniela Jentsch
- Melanie Robillard
- Kasia Selwand
- Lynsay Ryan
