= 2011 Red Deer Curling Classic =

- Host city: Red Deer, Alberta
- Arena: Red Deer Curling Club
- Dates: November 4–7, 2011
- Men's winner: (Alberta) Jamie King
- Curling club: Calgary CC, Calgary
- Skip: Jamie King
- Fourth: Warren Hassall
- Second: Todd Brick
- Lead: Sean Morris
- Finalist: (Northwest Territories) Jamie Koe
- Women's winner: (Switzerland) Silvana Tirinzoni
- Skip: Silvana Tirinzoni
- Third: Irene Schori
- Second: Esther Neuenschwander
- Lead: Sandra Gantenbein
- Finalist: (British Columbia) Kelley Law

The 2011 Red Deer Curling Classic was held from November 4 to 7 at the Red Deer Curling Club in Red Deer, Alberta as part of the 2011–12 World Curling Tour. The purse for the men's event was CAD$32,000, while the purse for the women's event was CAD$34,000. Both events were held in a triple knockout format.

== Men ==
=== Teams ===
Skip	Third	Second	Lead	Locale
Tom Appelman	Adam Enright	Brandon Klassen	Nathan Connolly	Edmonton, Alberta
Rob Armitage	Randy Ponich	Trevor Sparks	Keith Glover	Red Deer, Alberta
Brent Bawel	Mike Jantzen	Sean O'Connor	Hardi Sulimma	Calgary, Alberta
Matthew Blandford	Tom Sallows	Mike Westlund	Chris Sanford	Cold Lake, Alberta
Warren Cross	Dean Darwent	Kyle Richard	Colin Huber	Edmonton, Alberta
Albert Gerdung	Vance Elder (skip)	Darren Grierson	Trevor Slupski	Brooks, Alberta
Brad Heidt	Mitch Heidt	Josh Heidt	Regis Neumeier	Kindersley, Saskatchewan
Glen Kennedy	Dustin Eckstrand	Steve Meadows	Kris Meadows	Edmonton, Alberta
Warren Hassall (fourth)	Jamie King (skip)	Todd Brick	Sean Morris	Edmonton/Calgary, Alberta
Jamie Koe	Chris Schille	Braeden Moskowy	D.J Kidby	Yellowknife, Northwest Territories
Liu Rui	Xu Xiaoming	Zang Jialiang	Ba Dexin	Harbin, China
Scott Manners	Tyler Lang	Ryan Deis	Mike Armstrong	North Battleford, Saskatchewan
Leon Moch	Delvin Moch	Kevin Aberle	Donny Zahn	Medicine Hat, Alberta
Jason Montgomery	Mike Wood	Miles Craig	William Duggan	Duncan, British Columbia
Darren Moulding	Scott Cruickshank	Shaun Planaden	Kyle Iverson	Red Deer, Alberta
Kevin Park	Shane Park	Aaron Sluchinski	Justin Sluchinski	Edmonton, Alberta
Claudio Pescia	Sven Iten	Reto Seiler	Rainer Kobler	St. Gallen, Switzerland
Dan Petryk (fourth)	Steve Petryk (skip)	Colin Hodgson	Brad Chyz	Calgary, Alberta
Dean Ross	Don DeLair	Chris Blackwell	Steve Jensen	Calgary, Alberta
Christof Schwaller	Alexander Attinger	Robert Hürlimann	Felix Attinger	Switzerland
Randie Shen	Brendon Liu	Nicolas Hsu	Jan-Quinn Yu	Taipei City, Chinese Taipei
Brock Virtue	J. D. Lind	Dominic Daemen	Matthew Ng	Calgary, Alberta
Wade White	Kevin Tym	Dan Holowaychuk	George White	Edmonton, Alberta
Darren Nelson (fourth)	Brad Wood (skip)	Darin Gerow	Cal Jackson	Vernon, British Columbia

=== Knockout results ===
==== A event ====
First Knockout
(British Columbia) Jason Montgomery	3
(Alberta) Vance Elder	6
(China) Liu Rui	6
(Alberta) Darren Moulding	3
(Alberta) Dean Ross	4
(Alberta) Jamie King	5
(Alberta) Wade White	4
(Switzerland) Christof Schwaller	3

Semifinals
(Alberta) Vance Elder	5
(China) Liu Rui	8
(Alberta) Jamie King	6
(Alberta) Wade White	4

Qualifier 1
(China) Liu Rui	6
(Alberta) Jamie King	7

First Knockout
(Alberta) Steve Petryk	8
(Alberta) Glen Kennedy	7
(Saskatchewan) Brad Heidt	6
(Alberta) Leon Moch	5
(British Columbia) Brad Wood	2
(Alberta) Warren Cross	7
(Alberta) Kevin Park	9
(Switzerland) Claudio Pescia	3

Semifinals
(Alberta) Steve Petryk	7
(Saskatchewan) Brad Heidt	2
(Alberta) Warren Cross	5
(Alberta) Kevin Park	9

Qualifier 2
(Alberta) Steve Petryk	5
(Alberta) Kevin Park	7

First Knockout
(Alberta) Brent Bawel	4
(Saskatchewan) Scott Manners	3
(Alberta) Rob Armitage	8
(Chinese Taipei) Randie Shen	1
(Alberta) Tom Appelman	6
(Alberta) Matthew Blandford	2
(Northwest Territories) Jamie Koe	2
(Alberta) Brock Virtue	4

Semifinals
(Alberta) Brent Bawel	4
(Alberta) Rob Armitage	8
(Alberta) Tom Appelman	3
(Alberta) Brock Virtue	6

Qualifier 3
(Alberta) Rob Armitage	3
(Alberta) Brock Virtue	8

==== B event ====
Second Knockout
(British Columbia) Jason Montgomery	7
(Alberta) Darren Moulding	1
(Alberta) Dean Ross	5
(Switzerland) Christof Schwaller	7

Quarterfinals
(Alberta) Brent Bawel	5
(British Columbia) Jason Montgomery	4
(Alberta) Tom Appelman	8
(Switzerland) Christof Schwaller	6

Semifinals
(Alberta) Brent Bawel	4
(Alberta) Tom Appelman	2

Qualifier 4
(Alberta) Brent Bawel	5
(Alberta) Steve Petryk	4

Second Knockout
(Alberta) Glen Kennedy	5
(Alberta) Leon Moch	2
(British Columbia) Brad Wood	3
(Switzerland) Claudio Pescia	6

Quarterfinals
(Alberta) Vance Elder	8
(Alberta) Glen Kennedy	3
(Alberta) Wade White	5
(Switzerland) Claudio Pescia	7

Semifinals
(Alberta) Vance Elder	8
(Switzerland) Claudio Pescia	6

Qualifier 5
(Alberta) Vance Elder	7
(Alberta) Rob Armitage	5

Second Knockout
(Saskatchewan) Scott Manners	5
(Chinese Taipei) Randie Shen	6
(Alberta) Matthew Blandford	3
(Northwest Territories) Jamie Koe	6

Quarterfinals
(Saskatchewan) Brad Heidt	9
(Chinese Taipei) Randie Shen	8
(Alberta) Warren Cross	3
(Northwest Territories) Jamie Koe	6

Semifinals
(Saskatchewan) Brad Heidt	3
(Northwest Territories) Jamie Koe	5

Qualifier 6
(Northwest Territories) Jamie Koe	4
(China) Liu Rui	7

==== C event ====
Third Knockout
(Alberta) Glen Kennedy	8
(Alberta) Wade White	7
(Chinese Taipei) Randie Shen	2
(Alberta) Warren Cross	4

Quarterfinals
(British Columbia) Jason Montgomery	5
(Switzerland) Christof Schwaller	6
(Alberta) Glen Kennedy	3
(Saskatchewan) Brad Heidt	7
(Alberta) Tom Appelman	6
(Alberta) Warren Cross	3

Semifinals
(Switzerland) Christof Schwaller	6
(Saskatchewan) Brad Heidt	8
(Alberta) Tom Appelman	6
(Alberta) Rob Armitage	2

Qualifier 7
(Saskatchewan) Brad Heidt	2
(Alberta) Tom Appelman	7

Third Knockout
(Alberta) Darren Moulding	4
(Alberta) Dean Ross	5
(Alberta) Leon Moch	7
(British Columbia) Brad Wood	5
(Saskatchewan) Scott Manners	6
(Alberta) Matthew Blandford	8

Quarterfinals
(Alberta) Dean Ross	8
(Switzerland) Claudio Pescia	2
(Alberta) Leon Moch	8
(Alberta) Matthew Blandford	2

Semifinals
(Northwest Territories) Jamie Koe	7
(Alberta) Dean Ross	2
(Alberta) Steve Petryk	9
(Alberta) Leon Moch	4

Qualifier 8
(Northwest Territories) Jamie Koe	7
(Alberta) Steve Petryk	6

=== Playoffs ===
Quarterfinal
(Alberta) Jamie King	7
(China) Liu Rui	6
(Alberta) Brent Bawel	6
(Alberta) Vance Elder	5
(Alberta) Kevin Park	4
(Alberta) Tom Appelman	6
(Alberta) Brock Virtue	1
(Northwest Territories) Jamie Koe	7

Semifinal
(Alberta) Jamie King	6
(Alberta) Brent Bawel	5
(Alberta) Tom Appelman	6
(Northwest Territories) Jamie Koe	7

Final
(Alberta) Jamie King	6
(Northwest Territories) Jamie Koe	4

== Women ==
=== Teams ===
Skip	Third	Second	Lead	Locale
Brett Barber	Kailena Bay	Allison Cameron	Krista White	Biggar, Saskatchewan
Cheryl Bernard	Susan O'Connor	Lori Olson-Johns	Jennifer Sadleir	Calgary, Alberta
Chelsea Carey	Kristy Jenion	Kristen Foster	Lindsay Titheridge	Morden, Manitoba
Nadine Chyz	Rebecca Pattison	Whitney More	Kimberly Anderson	Calgary, Alberta
Delia DeJong	Jessica Monk	Amy Janko	Aisha Veiner	Grande Prairie, Alberta
Glenys Bakker (fourth)	Heather Jensen	Brenda Doroshuk (skip)	Carly Quigley	Calgary, Alberta
Tanilla Doyle	Lindsay Amudsen-Meyer	Janice Bailey	Christina Faulkner	Calgary, Alberta
Lisa Eyamie	Maria Bushell	Jodi Marthaller	Kyla MacLachlan	Calgary, Alberta
Kerry Galusha	Sharon Cormier	Wendy Miller	Shona Barbour	Yellowknife, Northwest Territories
Amber Holland	Kim Schneider	Tammy Schneider	Heather Kalenchuk	Kronau, Saskatchewan
Rachel Homan	Emma Miskew	Alison Kreviazuk	Lisa Weagle	Ottawa, Ontario
Jennifer Jones	Kaitlyn Lawes	Joëlle Sabourin	Dawn Askin	Winnipeg, Manitoba
Jessie Kaufman	Nicky Kaufman	Amanda Coderre	Stephanie Enright	Edmonton, Alberta
Shannon Kleibrink	Amy Nixon	Bronwen Webster	Chelsey Matson	Calgary, Alberta
Kelley Law	Shannon Aleksic	Kirsten Fox	Dawn Suliak	New Westminster, British Columbia
Allison MacInnes	Grace MacInnes	Diane Gushulak	Amanda Guido	Kamloops, British Columbia
Heather Nedohin	Beth Iskiw	Jessica Mair	Laine Peters	Edmonton, Alberta
Allison Nimik	Lori Eddy	Kimberly Tuck	Julie Columbus	Elmvale, Ontario
Tiffany Odegard	Andrea McCutcheon	Jennifer Van Wieren	Heather Kushnir	Edmonton, Alberta
Ayumi Ogasawara	Yumie Funayama	Kaho Onodera	Chinami Yoshida	Sapporo, Japan
Mirjam Ott	Carmen Schäfer	Carmen Küng	Janine Greiner	Switzerland
Cathy Overton-Clapham	Jenna Loder	Ashley Howard	Breanne Meakin	Winnipeg, Manitoba
Desirée Owen	Cary-Anne Sallows	Lindsay Makichuk	Stephanie Malekoff	Grande Prairie, Alberta
Sheri Pickering	Cheyanne Creasser	Karen Schiml	Donna Phillips	Calgary, Alberta
Casey Scheidegger	Kalynn Park	Jessie Scheidegger	Joelle Horn	Lethbridge, Alberta
Kelly Scott	Dailene Sivertson	Sasha Carter	Jacquie Armstrong	Kelowna, British Columbia
Michele Smith (fourth)	Heather Armstrong	Shana Snell (skip)	Alanna Blackwell	Calgary, Alberta
Renée Sonnenberg	Lawnie MacDonald	Kristie Moore	Rona Pasika	Grande Prairie, Alberta
Valerie Sweeting	Leslie Rogers	Joanne Taylor	Rachelle Pidherny	Edmonton, Alberta
Jill Thurston	Kerri Einarson	Kendra Georges	Sarah Wazney	Winnipeg, Manitoba
Silvana Tirinzoni	Irene Schori	Esther Neuenschwander	Sandra Gantenbein	Switzerland
Crystal Webster	Erin Carmody	Geri-Lynn Ramsay	Samantha Preston	Calgary, Alberta

=== Knockout results ===
==== A event ====
First Knockout
(Alberta) Casey Scheidegger	5
(Alberta) Jessie Kaufman	2
(Japan) Ayumi Ogasawara	4
(Alberta) Cheryl Bernard	5
(Manitoba) Chelsea Carey	5
(British Columbia) Kelley Law	7
(Alberta) Shana Snell	3
(Alberta) Renée Sonnenberg	10
(Alberta) Brenda Doroshuk	2
(Switzerland) Mirjam Ott	9
(Alberta) Shannon Kleibrink	9
(Alberta) Delia DeJong	2
(Ontario) Rachel Homan	7
(Alberta) Tiffany Odegard	0
(Saskatchewan) Brett Barber	3
(Manitoba) Cathy Overton-Clapham	11

Quarterfinals
(Alberta) Casey Scheidegger	3
(Alberta) Cheryl Bernard	5
(British Columbia) Kelley Law	6
(Alberta) Renée Sonnenberg	4
(Switzerland) Mirjam Ott	6
(Alberta) Shannon Kleibrink	5
(Ontario) Rachel Homan	8
(Manitoba) Cathy Overton-Clapham	3

Semifinals
(Alberta) Cheryl Bernard	4
(British Columbia) Kelley Law	7
(Switzerland) Mirjam Ott	5
(Ontario) Rachel Homan	7

Qualifier 1
(British Columbia) Kelley Law	6
(Ontario) Rachel Homan	8

First Knockout
(Ontario) Allison Nimik	6
(British Columbia) Allison MacInnes	8
(Alberta) Lisa Eyamie	6
(Manitoba) Jennifer Jones	3
(Alberta) Tanilla Doyle	5
(Saskatchewan) Amber Holland	4
(Northwest Territories) Kerry Galusha	4
(Alberta) Heather Nedohin	5
(Switzerland) Silvana Tirinzoni	7
(Alberta) Valerie Sweeting	2
(Alberta) Nadine Chyz	8
(British Columbia) Kelly Scott	3
(Alberta) Crystal Webster	6
(Manitoba) Jill Thurston	2
(Alberta) Desiree Owen	8
(Alberta) Sheri Pickering	2

Quarterfinals
(British Columbia) Allison MacInnes	6
(Alberta) Lisa Eyamie	5
(Alberta) Tanilla Doyle	6
(Alberta) Heather Nedohin	5
(Switzerland) Silvana Tirinzoni	5
(Alberta) Nadine Chyz	2
(Alberta) Crystal Webster	7
(Alberta) Desiree Owen	6

Semifinals
(British Columbia) Allison MacInnes	6
(Alberta) Tanilla Doyle	1
(Switzerland) Silvana Tirinzoni	7
(Alberta) Crystal Webster	2

Qualifier 2
(British Columbia) Allison MacInnes	5
(Switzerland) Silvana Tirinzoni	7

==== B event ====
Second Knockout
(Alberta) Jessie Kaufman	10
(Japan) Ayumi Ogasawara	1
(Alberta) Shana Snell	8
(Manitoba) Chelsea Carey	4

Quarterfinals
(Alberta) Desiree Owen	2
(Alberta) Jessie Kaufman	9
(Alberta) Nadine Chyz	9
(Alberta) Shana Snell	4

Semifinals
(Alberta) Jessie Kaufman	5
(Alberta) Tanilla Doyle	3
(Alberta) Nadine Chyz	0
(Switzerland) Mirjam Ott	9

To Qualifier 3
(Alberta) Jessie Kaufman	5
(Switzerland) Mirjam Ott	7

Second Knockout
(Alberta) Brenda Doroshuk	6
(Alberta) Delia DeJong	5
(Alberta) Tiffany Odegard	7
(Saskatchewan) Brett Barber	8

Quarterfinals
(Alberta) Heather Nedohin	5
(Alberta) Brenda Doroshuk	3
(Alberta) Lisa Eyamie	7
(Saskatchewan) Brett Barber	3

Semifinals
(Alberta) Heather Nedohin	4
(Alberta) Lisa Eyamie	3

To Qualifier 3
(Alberta) Heather Nedohin	3
(British Columbia) Kelley Law	8
Qualifier 3
(Switzerland) Mirjam Ott	6
(British Columbia) Kelley Law	5

Second Knockout
(Ontario) Allison Nimik	3
(Manitoba) Jennifer Jones	8
(Saskatchewan) Amber Holland	8
(Northwest Territories) Kerry Galusha	5

Quarterfinals
(Manitoba) Cathy Overton-Clapham	3
(Manitoba) Jennifer Jones	4
(Alberta) Shannon Kleibrink	8
(Saskatchewan) Amber Holland	10

Semifinals
(Manitoba) Jennifer Jones	8
(Alberta) Crystal Webster	2
(Saskatchewan) Amber Holland	4
(Alberta) Cheryl Bernard	5

To Qualifier 4
(Manitoba) Jennifer Jones	8
(Alberta) Cheryl Bernard	3

Second Knockout
(Alberta) Valerie Sweeting	5
(British Columbia) Kelly Scott	6
(Manitoba) Jill Thurston	12
(Alberta) Sheri Pickering	1

Quarterfinals
(Alberta) Renée Sonnenberg	4
(British Columbia) Kelly Scott	3
(Alberta) Casey Scheidegger	8
(Manitoba) Jill Thurston	1

Semifinals
(Alberta) Renée Sonnenberg	5
(Alberta) Casey Scheidegger	4

To Qualifier 4
(Alberta) Renée Sonnenberg	9
(British Columbia) Allison MacInnes	8
Qualifier 4
(Manitoba) Jennifer Jones	9
(Alberta) Renée Sonnenberg	4

==== C-Event ====
Third Knockout
(Japan) Ayumi Ogasawara	1
(Manitoba) Chelsea Carey	7
(Alberta) Delia DeJong	5
(Alberta) Tiffany Odegard	8

Quarterfinals
(Alberta) Crystal Webster	2
(Manitoba) Chelsea Carey	7
(Saskatchewan) Amber Holland	9
(Alberta) Tiffany Odegard	4

Semifinals
(Manitoba) Chelsea Carey	5
(Saskatchewan) Amber Holland	7

Qualifier 5
(Saskatchewan) Amber Holland	4
(British Columbia) Kelley Law	9

Third Knockout
(Alberta) Brenda Doroshuk	2
(Saskatchewan) Brett Barber	8

Quarterfinals
(Alberta) Desiree Owen	4
(Alberta) Shana Snell	2
(Alberta) Casey Scheidegger	10
(Saskatchewan) Brett Barber	3

Semifinals
(Alberta) Desiree Owen	6
(British Columbia) Allison MacInnes	1
(Alberta) Casey Scheidegger	7
(Alberta) Cheryl Bernard	1

Qualifier 6
(Alberta) Desiree Owen	5
(Alberta) Casey Scheidegger	1

Third Knockout
(British Columbia) Kelly Scott	3
(Manitoba) Jill Thurston	8

Quarterfinals
(Alberta) Lisa Eyamie	2
(Manitoba) Jill Thurston	8
(Manitoba) Cathy Overton-Clapham	6
(Alberta) Shannon Kleibrink	4

Semifinals
(Manitoba) Jill Thurston	2
(Alberta) Jessie Kaufman	7
(Manitoba) Cathy Overton-Clapham	5
(Alberta) Heather Nedohin	4

Qualifier 7
(Alberta) Jessie Kaufman	8
(Manitoba) Cathy Overton-Clapham	3

Third Knockout
(Ontario) Allison Nimik	2
(Northwest Territories) Kerry Galusha	7
(Alberta) Valerie Sweeting	5
(Alberta) Sheri Pickering	4

Quarterfinals
(Alberta) Tanilla Doyle	6
(Northwest Territories) Kerry Galusha	8
(Alberta) Nadine Chyz	4
(Alberta) Valerie Sweeting	6

Semifinals
(Northwest Territories) Kerry Galusha	4
(Alberta) Valerie Sweeting	7

Qualifier 8
(Alberta) Valerie Sweeting	2
(Alberta) Renée Sonnenberg	6

=== Playoffs ===
Quarterfinal
(Ontario) Rachel Homan	8
(Alberta) Desiree Owen	5
(Manitoba) Jennifer Jones	3
(British Columbia) Kelley Law	4
(Switzerland) Silvana Tirinzoni	6
(Alberta) Jessie Kaufman	5
(Switzerland) Mirjam Ott	4
(Alberta) Renée Sonnenberg	7

Semifinal
(Ontario) Rachel Homan	4
(British Columbia) Kelley Law	6
(Switzerland) Silvana Tirinzoni	4
(Alberta) Renée Sonnenberg	3

Final
(British Columbia) Kelley Law	3
(Switzerland) Silvana Tirinzoni	6
