= 2012 Red Deer Curling Classic =

- Host city: Red Deer, Alberta
- Arena: Red Deer Curling Club
- Dates: November 2–5
- Men's winner: (Alberta) Team Bottcher
- Curling club: Saville Sports Centre, Edmonton
- Skip: Brendan Bottcher
- Third: Micky Lizmore
- Second: Bradley Thiessen
- Lead: Karrick Martin
- Finalist: (Alberta) Kevin Koe
- Women's winner: (Manitoba) Team Carey
- Curling club: Morden Curling Club, Morden
- Skip: Chelsea Carey
- Third: Kristy McDonald
- Second: Kristen Foster
- Lead: Lindsay Titheridge
- Finalist: (Manitoba) Kaitlyn Lawes

The 2012 Red Deer Curling Classic was held from November 2 to 5 at the Red Deer Curling Club in Red Deer, Alberta as part of the 2012–13 World Curling Tour. The event was held in a triple knockout format. The purse for the men's event was CAD$33,000, of which the winner, Brendan Bottcher, received CAD$9,000. The purse for the women's event was CAD$36,000, of which the winner, Chelsea Carey, received CAD$9,500. Bottcher defeated Kevin Koe in the men's final with a score of 6–3, while Carey defeated Kaitlyn Lawes, who was skipping in place of Jennifer Jones, in the women's final with a score of 7–3.

== Men ==
=== Teams ===
The teams are listed as follows:

Skip	Third	Second	Lead	Locale
Tom Appelman	Brent Bawel	Ted Appelman	Brendan Melnyk	Edmonton, Alberta
Rob Armitage	Keith Glover	Randy Ponich	Wilf Edgar	Red Deer, Alberta
Matthew Blandford	Evan Asmussen	Brent Hamilton	Brad Chyz	Calgary, Alberta
Brendan Bottcher	Micky Lizmore	Bradley Thiessen	Karrick Martin	Edmonton, Alberta
Nathan Connolly	Brandon Klassen	Adam Enright	Parker Konschuh	Edmonton, Alberta
Warren Cross	Dean Darwent	Jim Wallbank	Chad Jones	Edmonton, Alberta
Josh Heidt	Brock Montgomery	Matt Lang	Dustin Kidby	Kerrobert, Saskatchewan
Joel Jordison	Jason Ackerman	Brent Goeres	Curtis Horwath	Moose Jaw, Saskatchewan
Jamie Koe	Tom Naugler	Brad Chorostkowski	Rob Borden	Yellowknife, Northwest Territories
Kevin Koe	Pat Simmons	Carter Rycroft	Nolan Thiessen	Edmonton, Alberta
Liu Rui	Xu Xiaoming	Zang Jialiang	Ba Dexin	Harbin, China
Scott Manners	Tyler Lang	Ryan Deis	Mike Armstrong	North Battleford, Saskatchewan
Rick McKague	Jim Moats	Doug McNish	Paul Strandlund	Edmonton, Alberta
Sven Michel	Claudio Pätz	Sandro Trolliet	Simon Gempeler	Adelboden, Switzerland
Leon Moch	Delvin Moch	Kyle Wagner	Greg Sjolie	Medicine Hat, Alberta
Darren Moulding	Scott Cruickshank	Shaun Planaden	Kyle Iverson	Calgary, Alberta
Sean O'Connor	Rob Johnson	Ryan O'Connor	Dan Bubola	Calgary, Alberta
Kevin Park	Shane Park	Josh Burns	Eric Richard	Edmonton, Alberta
Dan Petryk (fourth)	Steve Petryk (skip)	Roland Robinson	Thomas Usselman	Calgary, Alberta
Randie Shen	Brendon Liu	Nicolas Hsu	Justin Hsu	Taipei, Chinese Taipei
Justin Sluchinski	Aaron Sluchinski	Dylan Webster	Craig Bourgonje	Airdrie, Alberta
Charley Thomas	J. D. Lind	Dominic Daemen	Matthew Ng	Calgary, Alberta
Brock Virtue	Braeden Moskowy	Chris Schille	D. J Kidby	Regina, Saskatchewan
Wade White	Kevin Tym	Dan Holowaychuk	George White	Edmonton, Alberta
Jeremy Hodges (fourth)	Matt Willerton (skip)	Craig MacAlpine	Chris Evernden	Edmonton, Alberta
Kevin Yablonski	Vance Elder	Harrison Boss	Matthew McDonald	Calgary, Alberta
Zou Dejia	Chen Lu'an	Ji Yangsong	Li Guangxu	Harbin, China

=== Knockout results ===
==== A event ====
First Knockout
(Alberta) Tom Appelman	6
(Saskatchewan) Josh Heidt	4
(British Columbia) Tyler Perepolkin	1
(China) Liu Rui	7
(Alberta) Matthew Blandford	5
(Switzerland) Sven Michel	4
(Alberta) Rick McKague	0
(Alberta) Charley Thomas	6
(Alberta) Brendan Bottcher	7
(Alberta) Rob Armitage	3
(Saskatchewan) Joel Jordison	5
(Alberta) Justin Sluchinski	4

Quarterfinals
(Alberta) Tom Appelman	7
(China) Liu Rui	6
(Alberta) Matthew Blandford	7
(Alberta) Charley Thomas	5
(Alberta) Brendan Bottcher	4
(Saskatchewan) Joel Jordison	5
(Alberta) Nathan Connolly	3
(Alberta) Kevin Koe	6

Semifinals
(Alberta) Tom Appelman	6
(Alberta) Matthew Blandford	8
(Saskatchewan) Joel Jordison	3
(Alberta) Kevin Koe	5

Qualifier 1
(Alberta) Matthew Blandford	1
(Alberta) Kevin Koe	5

First Knockout
(Alberta) Warren Cross	8
(China) Zou Dejia	5
(Saskatchewan) Scott Manners	5
(Alberta) Sean O'Connor	7
(Alberta) Kevin Park	7
(Saskatchewan) Brock Virtue	4
(Alberta) Wade White	5
(Chinese Taipei) Randie Shen	4
(Alberta) Leon Moch	6
(Northwest Territories) Jamie Koe	5
(Alberta) Darren Moulding	4
(Alberta) Steve Petryk	2

Quarterfinals
(Alberta) Warren Cross	3
(Alberta) Sean O'Connor	5
(Alberta) Kevin Park	4
(Alberta) Wade White	7
(Alberta) Leon Moch	4
(Alberta) Darren Moulding	7
(Alberta) Matt Willerton	8
(Alberta) Kevin Yablonski	3

Semifinals
(Alberta) Sean O'Connor	5
(Alberta) Wade White	7
(Alberta) Darren Moulding	4
(Alberta) Matt Willerton	7

Qualifier 2
(Alberta) Wade White	5
(Alberta) Matt Willerton	2

==== B event ====
Second Knockout
(Saskatchewan) Josh Heidt	4
(British Columbia) Tyler Perepolkin	7
(Alberta) Rick McKague	6
(Switzerland) Sven Michel	3

Quarterfinals
(Alberta) Nathan Connolly	1
(British Columbia) Tyler Perepolkin	4
(Alberta) Brendan Bottcher	5
(Alberta) Rick McKague	1

Semifinals
(British Columbia) Tyler Perepolkin	4
(Alberta) Sean O'Connor	7
(Alberta) Brendan Bottcher	7
(Alberta) Darren Moulding	5

To Qualifier 3
(Alberta) Sean O'Connor	4
(Alberta) Brendan Bottcher	7
Qualifier 3
(Alberta) Brendan Bottcher	7
(Alberta) Matthew Blandford	1

Second Knockout		Semifinals		To Qualifier 3
(Alberta) Rob Armitage	6
(Alberta) Justin Sluchinski	3	(Alberta) Rob Armitage	2
(Alberta) Charley Thomas	6	(China) Liu Rui	9
(China) Liu Rui	8			(China) Liu Rui	4
				(Alberta) Matthew Blandford	8

Second Knockout
(China) Zou Dejia	4
(Saskatchewan) Scott Manners	7
(Saskatchewan) Brock Virtue	3
(Chinese Taipei) Randie Shen	2

Quarterfinals
(Alberta) Leon Moch	3
(Saskatchewan) Scott Manners	5
(Alberta) Kevin Yablonski	1
(Saskatchewan) Brock Virtue	4

Semifinals
(Saskatchewan) Scott Manners	3
(Alberta) Tom Appelman	5
(Saskatchewan) Brock Virtue	2
(Saskatchewan) Joel Jordison	7

To Qualifier 4
(Alberta) Tom Appelman	5
(Saskatchewan) Joel Jordison	3
Qualifier 4
(Alberta) Tom Appelman	2
(Alberta) Matt Willerton	5

Second Knockout		Semifinals		To Qualifier 4
(Alberta) Warren Cross	3
(Alberta) Kevin Park	9	(Alberta) Kevin Park	9
(Northwest Territories) Jamie Koe	4	(Alberta) Steve Petryk	6
(Alberta) Steve Petryk	8			(Alberta) Kevin Park	4
				(Alberta) Matt Willerton	8

==== C event ====
Third Knockout
(Saskatchewan) Josh Heidt	1
(Switzerland) Sven Michel	8

Quarterfinals
(Alberta) Justin Sluchinski	3
(Switzerland) Sven Michel	6
(Saskatchewan) Scott Manners	8
(Saskatchewan) Brock Virtue	4

Semifinals
(Switzerland) Sven Michel	5
(Saskatchewan) Scott Manners	6

Qualifier 5
(Saskatchewan) Scott Manners	1
(Alberta) Matthew Blandford	7

Third Knockout
(British Columbia) Tyler Perepolkin	7
(Alberta) Kevin Yablonski	2
(Alberta) Rob Armitage	9
(Alberta) Steve Petryk	1

Semifinals
(British Columbia) Tyler Perepolkin	9
(China) Liu Rui	3
(Alberta) Rob Armitage	8
(Alberta) Sean O'Connor	2

Qualifier 6
(British Columbia) Tyler Perepolkin	6
(Alberta) Rob Armitage	7

Third Knockout
(Alberta) Darren Moulding	7
(Alberta) Leon Moch	3
(Alberta) Nathan Connolly	4
(Alberta) Warren Cross	3

Semifinals
(Alberta) Darren Moulding	7
(Alberta) Kevin Park	8
(Alberta) Nathan Connolly	4
(Saskatchewan) Joel Jordison	5

Qualifier 7
(Alberta) Kevin Park	5
(Saskatchewan) Joel Jordison	3

Third Knockout
(China) Zou Dejia	6
(Chinese Taipei) Randie Shen	3

Quarterfinals
(Northwest Territories) Jamie Koe	2
(China) Zou Dejia	5
(Alberta) Rick McKague	4
(Alberta) Charley Thomas	5

Semifinals
(China) Zou Dejia	10
(Alberta) Charley Thomas	5

Qualifier 8
(China) Zou Dejia	3
(Alberta) Tom Appelman	6

=== Playoffs ===
Quarterfinals
(Alberta) Kevin Koe	4
(Alberta) Rob Armitage	1
(Alberta) Matt Willerton	1
(Alberta) Matthew Blandford	10
(Alberta) Wade White	5
(Alberta) Kevin Park	3
(Alberta) Brendan Bottcher	5
(Alberta) Tom Appelman	2

Semifinals
(Alberta) Kevin Koe	8
(Alberta) Matthew Blandford	3
(Alberta) Wade White	1
(Alberta) Brendan Bottcher	7

Final
(Alberta) Kevin Koe	3
(Alberta) Brendan Bottcher	6

== Women ==
=== Teams ===
The teams are listed as follows:

Skip	Third	Second	Lead	Locale
Brett Barber	Robyn Silvernagle	Kailena Bay	Dayna Demmans	Regina, Saskatchewan
Cheryl Bernard	Susan O'Connor	Lori Olson-Johns	Shannon Aleksic	Calgary, Alberta
Chelsea Carey	Kristy McDonald	Kristen Foster	Lindsay Titheridge	Winnipeg, Manitoba
Laura Crocker	Sarah Wilkes	Rebecca Pattison	Jen Gates	Edmonton, Alberta
Deanna Doig	Kim Schneider	Colleen Ackerman	Michelle McIvor	Kronau, Saskatchewan
Tanilla Doyle	Joelle Horn	Lindsay Amundsen-Meyer	Christina Faulkner	Edmonton, Alberta
Lisa Eyamie	Maria Bushell	Jodi Marthaller	Valerie Hamende	High River, Alberta
Tiffany Game	Vanessa Pouliot	Jennifer Van Wieren	Melissa Pierce	Edmonton, Alberta
Michèle Jäggi	Marisa Winkelhausen	Stéphanie Jäggi	Malanie Barbezät	Bern, Switzerland
Heather Jensen	Shana Snell	Heather Rogers	Carly Quigley	Airdrie, Alberta
Kaitlyn Lawes	Kirsten Wall	Jill Officer	Dawn Askin	Winnipeg, Manitoba
Shannon Kleibrink	Bronwen Webster	Kalynn Park	Chelsey Matson	Calgary, Alberta
Allison MacInnes	Grace MacInnes	Diane Gushulak	Jacalyn Brown	Kamloops, British Columbia
Lindsay Makichuk	Amy Janko	Jessica Monk	Kristina Hadden	Edmonton, Alberta
Amy Nixon	Nadine Chyz	Whitney Eckstrand	Tracy Bush	Calgary/Red Deer, Alberta
Ayumi Ogasawara	Yumie Funayama	Kaho Onodera	Michiko Tomabechi	Sapporo, Japan
Mirjam Ott	Carmen Schäfer	Carmen Küng	Janine Greiner	Davos, Switzerland
Trish Paulsen	Kari Kennedy	Sarah Collins	Kari Paulsen	Saskatoon, Saskatchewan
Jocelyn Peterman	Brittany Tran	Rebecca Konschuh	Kristine Anderson	Red Deer, Alberta
Marilou Richter	Darah Provencal	Jessie Sanderson	Sandra Comadina	New Westminster, British Columbia
Leslie Rogers	Suzanne Walker	Jenilee Goertzen	Kelsey Latawiec	Edmonton, Alberta
Anna Sidorova	Ludmila Privivkova	Margarita Fomina	Ekaterina Galkina	Moscow, Russia
Manuela Siegrist	Alina Pätz	Nadine Lehmann	Nicole Dünki	Basel, Switzerland
Renée Sonnenberg	Lawnie MacDonald	Cary-Anne Sallows	Rona Pasika	Edmonton, Alberta
Barb Spencer	Katie Spencer	Ainsley Champagne	Raunora Westcott	Winnipeg, Manitoba
Tiffany Steuber	Megan Anderson	Lisa Miller	Cindy Westgard	Edmonton, Alberta
Valerie Sweeting	Dana Ferguson	Joanne Taylor	Rachelle Pidherny	Edmonton, Alberta
Jill Thurston	Kristen Phillips	Brette Richards	Kendra Georges	Winnipeg, Manitoba
Silvana Tirinzoni	Marlene Albrecht	Esther Neuenschwander	Sandra Gantenbein	Aarau, Switzerland
Crystal Webster	Erin Carmody	Geri-Lynn Ramsay	Samantha Preston	Calgary, Alberta
Holly Whyte	Heather Steele	Cori Dunbar	Jamie Forth	Edmonton, Alberta
Kelly Wood	Teejay Haichert	Kelsey Dutton	Janelle Tyler	Swift Current, Saskatchewan

=== Knockout results ===
==== A event ====
First Knockout
(Alberta) Tiffany Game	6
(Manitoba) Chelsea Carey	7
(Switzerland) Mirjam Ott	4
(Alberta) Tanilla Doyle	5
(Russia) Anna Sidorova	2
(Alberta) Crystal Webster	7
(British Columbia) Marilou Richter	4
(Saskatchewan) Brett Barber	3
(Alberta) Laura Crocker	5
(Alberta) Lisa Eyamie	4
(Alberta) Renée Sonnenberg	7
(Switzerland) Michèle Jäggi	4
(Alberta) Valerie Sweeting	5
(Japan) Ayumi Ogasawara	7
(Alberta) Amy Nixon	4
(Saskatchewan) Deanna Doig	6

Quarterfinals
(Manitoba) Chelsea Carey	6
(Alberta) Tanilla Doyle	3
(Alberta) Crystal Webster	3
(British Columbia) Marilou Richter	4
(Alberta) Laura Crocker	3
(Alberta) Renée Sonnenberg	7
(Japan) Ayumi Ogasawara	7
(Saskatchewan) Deanna Doig	0

Semifinals
(Manitoba) Chelsea Carey	6
(British Columbia) Marilou Richter	5
(Alberta) Renée Sonnenberg	8
(Japan) Ayumi Ogasawara	0

Qualifier 1
(Manitoba) Chelsea Carey	6
(Alberta) Renée Sonnenberg	4

First Knockout
(Alberta) Lindsay Makichuk	0
(Manitoba) Kaitlyn Lawes	7
(British Columbia) Allison MacInnes	2
(Alberta) Tiffany Steuber	9
(Alberta) Shannon Kleibrink	4
(Switzerland) Manuela Siegrist	5
(Alberta) Jocelyn Peterman	7
(Saskatchewan) Trish Paulsen	6
(Alberta) Heather Jensen	7
(Manitoba) Jill Thurston	5
(Switzerland) Silvana Tirinzoni	5
(Alberta) Holly Whyte	3
(Alberta) Leslie Rogers	3
(Manitoba) Barb Spencer	8
(Alberta) Cheryl Bernard	2
(Saskatchewan) Kelly Wood	5

Quarterfinals
(Manitoba) Kaitlyn Lawes	7
(Alberta) Tiffany Steuber	3
(Switzerland) Manuela Siegrist	3
(Alberta) Jocelyn Peterman	7
(Alberta) Heather Jensen	4
(Switzerland) Silvana Tirinzoni	5
(Manitoba) Barb Spencer	7
(Saskatchewan) Kelly Wood	2

Semifinals
(Manitoba) Kaitlyn Lawes	9
(Alberta) Jocelyn Peterman	3
(Switzerland) Silvana Tirinzoni	6
(Manitoba) Barb Spencer	5

Qualifier 2
(Manitoba) Kaitlyn Lawes	4
(Switzerland) Silvana Tirinzoni	3

==== B event ====
Second Knockout
(Alberta) Tiffany Game	6
(Switzerland) Mirjam Ott	4
(Saskatchewan) Brett Barber	0
(Russia) Anna Sidorova	9

Quarterfinals
(Saskatchewan) Kelly Wood	10
(Alberta) Tiffany Game	2
(Alberta) Heather Jensen	4
(Russia) Anna Sidorova	7

Semifinals
(Saskatchewan) Kelly Wood	5
(Alberta) Jocelyn Peterman	6
(Russia) Anna Sidorova	9
(Japan) Ayumi Ogasawara	1

To Qualifier 3
(Alberta) Jocelyn Peterman	0
(Russia) Anna Sidorova	7
Qualifier 3
(Russia) Anna Sidorova	3
(Switzerland) Manuela Siegrist	4

Second Knockout
(Alberta) Lisa Eyamie	6
(Switzerland) Michèle Jäggi	5
(Alberta) Valerie Sweeting	9
(Alberta) Amy Nixon	4

Quarterfinals
(Switzerland) Manuela Siegrist	7
(Alberta) Lisa Eyamie	5
(Alberta) Tiffany Steuber	2
(Alberta) Valerie Sweeting	7

Semifinals
(Switzerland) Manuela Siegrist	7
(Alberta) Valerie Sweeting	3

To Qualifier 3
(Switzerland) Manuela Siegrist	6
(Alberta) Renée Sonnenberg	5

Second Knockout
(Alberta) Lindsay Makichuk	2
(British Columbia) Allison MacInnes	7
(Alberta) Shannon Kleibrink	7
(Saskatchewan) Trish Paulsen	5

Quarterfinals
(Saskatchewan) Deanna Doig	6
(British Columbia) Allison MacInnes	5
(Alberta) Laura Crocker	6
(Alberta) Shannon Kleibrink	3

Semifinals
(Saskatchewan) Deanna Doig	7
(Manitoba) Barb Spencer	2
(Alberta) Laura Crocker	6
(British Columbia) Marilou Richter	0

To Qualifier 4
(Saskatchewan) Deanna Doig	5
(Alberta) Laura Crocker	6
Qualifier 4
(Alberta) Laura Crocker	4
(Switzerland) Silvana Tirinzoni	2

Second Knockout
(Manitoba) Jill Thurston	8
(Alberta) Holly Whyte	2
(Alberta) Leslie Rogers	3
(Alberta) Cheryl Bernard	4

Quarterfinals
(Alberta) Crystal Webster	8
(Manitoba) Jill Thurston	4
(Alberta) Tanilla Doyle	3
(Alberta) Cheryl Bernard	5

Semifinals
(Alberta) Crystal Webster	5
(Alberta) Cheryl Bernard	4

To Qualifier 4
(Alberta) Crystal Webster	6
(Switzerland) Silvana Tirinzoni	7

==== C event ====
Third Knockout
(Switzerland) Mirjam Ott	7
(Saskatchewan) Brett Barber	2
(Switzerland) Michèle Jäggi	6
(Alberta) Amy Nixon	1

Quarterfinals
(Manitoba) Barb Spencer	4
(Switzerland) Mirjam Ott	6
(British Columbia) Marilou Richter	7
(Switzerland) Michèle Jäggi	8

Semifinals
(Switzerland) Mirjam Ott	8
(Switzerland) Michèle Jäggi	6

Qualifier 5
(Switzerland) Mirjam Ott	6
(Russia) Anna Sidorova	5

Third Knockout
(Alberta) Lisa Eyamie	8
(Alberta) Tiffany Steuber	5

Quarterfinals
(Alberta) Tiffany Game	4
(Alberta) Heather Jensen	7
(Alberta) Cheryl Bernard	4
(Alberta) Lisa Eyamie	3

Semifinals
(Alberta) Heather Jensen	8
(Alberta) Crystal Webster	7
(Alberta) Cheryl Bernard	6
(Saskatchewan) Deanna Doig	5

Qualifier 6
(Alberta) Heather Jensen	3
(Alberta) Cheryl Bernard	5

Third Knockout
(Manitoba) Jill Thurston	6
(Alberta) Tanilla Doyle	4

Quarterfinals
(Alberta) Valerie Sweeting	7
(Manitoba) Jill Thurston	5
(British Columbia) Allison MacInnes	5
(Alberta) Shannon Kleibrink	7

Semifinals
(Alberta) Valerie Sweeting	5
(Alberta) Jocelyn Peterman	4
(Alberta) Shannon Kleibrink	6
(Alberta) Renée Sonnenberg	4

Qualifier 7
(Alberta) Valerie Sweeting	7
(Alberta) Shannon Kleibrink	4

Third Knockout
(Alberta) Lindsay Makichuk	3
(Saskatchewan) Trish Paulsen	7
(Alberta) Holly Whyte	5
(Alberta) Leslie Rogers	7

Quarterfinals
(Saskatchewan) Kelly Wood	3
(Saskatchewan) Trish Paulsen	6
(Japan) Ayumi Ogasawara	1
(Alberta) Leslie Rogers	8

Semifinals
(Saskatchewan) Trish Paulsen	5
(Alberta) Leslie Rogers	4

Qualifier 8
(Saskatchewan) Trish Paulsen	5
(Switzerland) Silvana Tirinzoni	6

=== Playoffs ===
Quarterfinals
(Manitoba) Chelsea Carey	6
(Alberta) Cheryl Bernard	3
(Alberta) Laura Crocker	5
(Switzerland) Mirjam Ott	6
(Manitoba) Kaitlyn Lawes	7
(Alberta) Valerie Sweeting	1
(Switzerland) Manuela Siegrist	5
(Switzerland) Silvana Tirinzoni	4

Semifinals
(Manitoba) Chelsea Carey	5
(Switzerland) Mirjam Ott	4
(Manitoba) Kaitlyn Lawes	7
(Switzerland) Manuela Siegrist	1

Final
(Manitoba) Chelsea Carey	7
(Manitoba) Kaitlyn Lawes	3
