= Austrian Men's Curling Championship =

The Austrian Men's Curling Championship (German: ÖCV Ergebnisse Staatsmeisterschafte, ÖSTM Herren) is the national championship of men's curling in Austria. It has been held annually since 1982. It is organized by the Austrian Curling Association (German: Österreichischer Curling Verband).

== List of champions and medallists ==
(Team line-up in order: skip (marked bold), third, second, lead, alternate(s), coach)

Year	Host city, arena	Champion team	Runner-up	Bronze	Placement at Euros	Placement at Worlds
1982	Oberstdorf, Curlinghalle	KCC (Kitzbühel Curling Club), team «Karhu» Jakob Küchl, Roland Koudelka, Günther Mochny, Otto Hölzl	CC Sillian, team «Videoton» Josef Gasteiger, Konrad Wieser, Thomas Wieser, Christian Wieser	KCC, team «Trend» Günther Märker, Herbert Dalik, Adolf Bachler, Walter Rossi	11	—
1983	Innsbruck, Olympia-Eisstadion	KCC, team «Sportalm» Artur Fabi, Günther Märker, Manfred Fabi, Dieter Küchenmeister	KCC, team «Karhu» Jakob Küchl, Roland Koudelka, Günther Mochny, Ernst Egger	CC Aurach; Alois Kreidl, Alois Mitterer-Egger, Georg Mitterer, Anton Koidl	12	9
1984	Stuttgart, Curlinghalle	KCC, team «Karhu» Günther Märker, Roland Koudelka, Günther Mochny, Ernst Egger, alternate: Jakob Küchl	CC Sillian; Alois Kreidl, Josef Gasteiger, Werner Jesacher, Thomas Novak	KCC, team «Tyrolia» Artur Fabi, Konrad Wieser, Manfred Fabi, Dieter Küchenmeister, alternate: Christian Wieser	14	10
1985	Kitzbühel, Zelthalle Kunsteisbahn	KCC, team «Tyrolia 1» Konrad Wieser, Thomas Wieser, Christian Wieser, Herwig Ritter	KCC, team «RDW» Günther Märker, Joachim Märker, Rupert Holzer, Roland Keuschnigg	KCC, team «Seppis Pub» Ludwig Karrer, Adolf Bachler, Walter Rossi, Josef Niederacher	10	—
1986	Stuttgart, Curlinghalle	KCC, team «Tyrolia» Konrad Wieser, Thomas Wieser, Christian Wieser, Herwig Ritter	?	?	9	—
1987	Kitzbühel, Curlinghalle	KCC, team «Head» Alois Kreidl, Günther Mochny, Dieter Küchenmeister, Stefan Salinger	?	?	9	—
1988	Kitzbühel, Curlinghalle	KCC, team «Head» Alois Kreidl, Günther Mochny, Dieter Küchenmeister, Stefan Salinger	?	?	9	—
1989	Kitzbühel, Curlinghalle	KCC, team «Head» Alois Kreidl, Thomas Wieser, Dieter Küchenmeister, Stefan Salinger	?	?	7	—
1990	Kitzbühel, Curlinghalle	KCC, team «Head» Alois Kreidl, Thomas Wieser, Dieter Küchenmeister, Stefan Salinger	KCC, team «Dalik» Herbert Dalik, Dieter Gfreiner, Peter Egger, Rupert Holzer	CC Wien 1 Manfred Hartl, Helmuth Schmidt, Thomas Derharschnig, Robert Deschka	12	—
1991	Kitzbühel, Curlinghalle	KCC, team «Seppis Pub» Jakob Küchl, Roland Koudelka, Ludwig Karrer, Adolf Bachler	KCC, team «Head» Alois Kreidl, Thomas Wieser, Stefan Salinger, Joachin Märker	KCC, team «Hasegg» Richard Obermoser, Franz Huber, Walter Egger, Wilfried Obermoser	10	—
1992; 13—16 feb.	Kitzbühel, Curlinghalle	KCC, team «Hypobank» Erich Schnederle, Bernard Embacher, Franz Huber, Florian Unterrainer	KCC, team «Head» Alois Kreidl, Thomas Wieser, Stefan Salinger, Dieter Küchenmeister	KCC, team «Dalik» Herbert Dalik, Dieter Gfreiner, Rupert Holzer, Peter Egger	16	—
1993	Kitzbühel, Curlinghalle	KCC, team «Head» Alois Kreidl, Thomas Wieser, Stefan Salinger, Roland Koudelka	KCC, team «Märker» Günther Märker, Joachim Märker, Mario Schipflinger, Markus Nothegger, alternate: Werner Wanker	KCC, team «Dalik» Herbert Dalik, Dieter Gfreiner, Peter Egger, Rupert Holzer	13	—
1994	Kitzbühel, Curlinghalle	KCC, team «Head» Alois Kreidl, Thomas Wieser, Stefan Salinger, Richard Obermoser	KCC, team «Dalik» Dieter Gfreiner, Peter Egger, Rupert Holzer, Walter Egger	KCC, team «Märker» Günther Märker, Joachim Märker, Markus Neumayr, Markus Nothegger	12	—
1995	Kitzbühel, Curlinghalle	KCC, team «Head» Alois Kreidl, Thomas Wieser, Stefan Salinger, Richard Obermoser	KCC, team «Juniors» Joachim Märker, Markus Neumayr, Mario Schipflinger, Markus Nothegger	KCC, team «Highlanders» Günther Märker, Werner Wanker, Oswald Hopfensberger, Martin Schweigl	10	—
1996	Kitzbühel, Curlinghalle	KCC, team «Kreidl» Alois Kreidl, Stefan Salinger, Richard Obermoser, Franz Huber	KCC, team «Küchl» Jakob Küchl, Roland Koudelka, Wolfgang Schober, Walter Egger	KCC, team «Märker» Günther Märker, Joachim Märker, Oswald Hopfensberger, Werner Wanker	9	—
1997	Kitzbühel, Curlinghalle	KCC, team «Kreidl» Alois Kreidl, Stefan Salinger, Franz Huber, Richard Obermoser	?	?	14	—
1998	Kitzbühel, Curlinghalle	KCC, team «Highlanders» Günther Märker, Joachim Märker, Oswald Hopfensberger, Werner Wanker	KCC, team «Generali» Alois Kreidl, Stefan Salinger, Richard Obermoser, Franz Huber	CC St. Johann; Bernard Embacher, Markus Hutter, Ewald Dandler, Florian Unterrainer	16	—
1999	Kitzbühel, Curlinghalle	KCC, team «Generali» Alois Kreidl, Stefan Salinger, Franz Huber, Werner Wanker	KCC, team «EM-Team 98» Joachim Märker, Markus Neumayr, Markus Nothegger, Thomas Krassnig	KCC, team «Junioren» Marco Reiner, Andreas Unterberger, Nikolaus Gasteiger, Manfred Sommer	15	—
2000	Kitzbühel, Curlinghalle	KCC, team «Generali» Alois Kreidl, Stefan Salinger, Franz Huber, Werner Wanker	KCC, team «Reiner» Marco Reiner, Andreas Unterberger, Nikolaus Gasteiger, Sylivester Kontur	CC St. Johann; Bernard Embacher, Markus Hutter, Ewald Dandler, Florian Unterrainer	15	—
2001	Kitzbühel, Curlinghalle	KCC, team «Generali» Alois Kreidl, Stefan Salinger, Andreas Unterberger, Werner Wanker	?	?	11	—
2002	Sankt Pölten, Traisenpark Eissportzentrum	KCC 1, team «Generali» Alois Kreidl, Stefan Salinger, Andreas Unterberger, Werner Wanker	CC St. Johann; Bernard Embacher, Markus Hutter, Ewald Dandler, Florian Unterrainer	KCC 2 Herbert Dalik, Dieter Gfreiner, Franz Huber, Richard Obermoser	10	10
2003	Kitzbühel, Curlinghalle	KCC 2, team «Zirl» Herbert Dalik, Dieter Gfreiner, Richard Obermoser, Franz Huber, alternate: Rupert Holzer	CC St. Margarethen 2 Harald Fendt, Andreas Schlögel, Peter Mondl, Max Schlögel	KCC, team «Generali» Alois Kreidl, Stefan Salinger, Andreas Unterberger, Werner Wanker	.	—
2004	Traun, Eissportzentrum	KCC 1 Alois Kreidl, Stefan Salinger, Andreas Unterberger, Werner Wanker	CC Traun; Markus Schagerl, Boris Seidl, Michael Katzenmayer, Manuel Seidl	CC St. Margarethen 2 Hubert Hierner, Franz Fendt, Josef Leputsch, Karl Hierner	15	—
2005	Kitzbühel, Curlinghalle	KCC 1 Alois Kreidl, Stefan Salinger, Andreas Unterberger, Werner Wanker, alternate: Nikolaus Gasteiger	CC St. Margarethen 2 Hubert Hierner, Franz Fendt, Josef Leputsch, Karl Hierner	CC Traun 1 Markus Schagerl, Boris Seidl, Michael Katzenmayer, Manuel Seidl	19	—
2006; 2—5 feb.	Traun, Eissportzentrum	CC St. Margarethen 1 Harald Fendt, Peter Mondl, Andreas Schlögel, Max Schlögel	CC Traun 1 Markus Schagerl, Boris Seidl, Michael Katzenmayer, Manuel Seidl	KCC 1 Alois Kreidl, Stefan Salinger, Nikolaus Gasteiger, Werner Wanker	23	—
2007; 8—11 feb.	Kitzbühel, Curlinghalle	KCC 1 Alois Kreidl, Richard Obermoser, Werner Wanker, Nikolaus Gasteiger	CC Traun 1 Markus Schagerl, Boris Seidl, Michael Skokan, Manuel Seidl, alternate: Armin Kvas	CC St. Margarethen 1 Harald Fendt, Andreas Schlögel, Peter Mondl, Max Schlögel	20	—
2008; 4—6 jan.	Traun, Eissportzentrum	KCC 1 Alois Kreidl, Stefan Salinger, Max Ehammer, Hubert Gründhammer, alternate: Florian Lintner	CC Traun 1 Markus Schagerl, Boris Seidl, Michael Skokan, Manuel Seidl, alternate: Elio Seidl	KCC 2 Andreas Unterberger, Florian Huber, Dominik Bertsch, Georg Hummelt	24	—
2009; 7—10 may	Sankt Pölten, Traisenpark Eissportzentrum	KCC 2 Andreas Unterberger, Harald Fendt, Florian Huber, Dominik Bertsch	KCC 1 Alois Kreidl, Stefan Salinger, Max Ehammer, Hubert Gründhammer, alternate: Florian Lintner	OCC; Simon Fleischanderl, Christopher Csenar, Gerald Raab, Christian Raab, alternate: Josef Affenzeller	19	—
2010; 25—28 feb.	Vienna, Wiener Stadthalle Vogelweidplatz	KCC 2 Alois Kreidl, Stefan Salinger, Max Ehammer, Hubert Gründhammer	OCC; Christopher Csenar, Gerald Raab, Christian Raab, Josef Affenzeller	CC Traun 1 Markus Schagerl, Michael Skokan, Ernst Hoffmann, Georg Haindrich	19	—
2011; 24—27 mar.	Kitzbühel, Sportpark	KCC 1 Alois Kreidl, Stefan Salinger, Max Ehammer, Hubert Gründhammer, alternate: Günter Huber	CFÖ; Andreas Unterberger, Markus Forejtek, Marcus Schmitt, Martin Egretzberger, alternate: Christian Sokele	KCC 1 Harald Fendt, Christian Roth, Florian Huber, Dominik Bertsch	15	—
2012; 2—5 feb.	Traun, Eissportzentrum	CFÖ; Andreas Unterberger, Markus Forejtek, Marcus Schmitt, Martin Egretzberger, alternate: Christian Sokele	OCC; Christopher Csenar, Gerald Raab, Christian Raab, Josef Affenzeller, alternate: Peter Polnitzky	CC Traun 2 Ronald Niederhauser, Christoph Steiner, Günter Dressler, Thomas Gugubauer, alternate: Klaus Hoffmann	21	—
2013; 2—5 may	?	CC Traun 1 Michael Skokan, Rainer Ammer, Boris Seidl, Manuel Seidl, alternate: Armin Kvas	KCC 1 Andreas Unterberger, Mathias Genner, Hubert Gründhammer, Günter Huber, alternate: Martin Reichel	CFÖ; Markus Forejtek, Martin Egretzberger, Marcus Schmitt, Christian Sokele	20	—
2014; 3—6 apr.	?	KCC 2 Sebastian Wunderer, Mathias Genner, Martin Reichel, Philipp Nothegger, alternate: Lukas Kirchmair	CFÖ; Markus Forejtek, Martin Egretzberger, Marcus Schmitt, Thomas Peichl	CC Traun 1 Rainer Ammer, Boris Seidl, Manuel Seidl, Michael Skokan, alternate: Armin Kvas	16	—
2015; 8—12 apr.	Kitzbühel, Curlinghalle Sportpark	KCC 2 Sebastian Wunderer, Mathias Genner, Martin Reichel, Philipp Nothegger, alternate: Lukas Kirchmair	CC Traun; Manuel Seidl, Boris Seidl, Hannes Auer, Georg Haindrich	OCC 2 Christopher Csenar, Gerald Raab, Florian Huber, Josef Affenzeller, alternate: Peter Polnitzky	12	—
2016; 1—3 apr.	Sankt Pölten, Eishalle	KCC 1 Sebastian Wunderer, Mathias Genner, Martin Reichel, Philipp Nothegger, alternate: Lukas Kirchmair	CFÖ; Markus Forejtek, Martin Egretzberger, Marcus Schmitt, Thomas Peichl, alternate: Felix Purzner	KCC 2 Alois Kreidl, Stefan Salinger, Hubert Gründhammer, Richard Obermoser, alternate: Günter Huber	8	—
2017; 23—26 mar.	Linz	KCC 1 Sebastian Wunderer, Mathias Genner, Martin Reichel, Philipp Nothegger, alternate: Lukas Kirchmair	KCC 2 Alois Kreidl, Stefan Salinger, Hubert Gründhammer, Max Ehammer, alternate: Günter Huber	OCC 2 Andreas Unterberger, Gernot Higatzberger, Stefan Markus, Hartwig Zimmerl, alternate: Florian Weidle	9	—
2018; 22—25 mar.	Kitzbühel, Sportpark	KCC 1 Sebastian Wunderer, Mathias Genner, Martin Reichel, Philipp Nothegger, alternate: Lukas Kirchmair	KCC 4 Florian Mavec, Jonas Backofen, Martin Seiwald, Jean Purcell	CFÖ; Markus Forejtek, Martin Egretzberger, Marcus Schmitt, Oliver Schöner	18	—
2019; 24—27 jan.	Traun, Eissportzentrum	KCC; Sebastian Wunderer, Mathias Genner, Martin Reichel, Philipp Nothegger, alternate: Lukas Kirchmair	OCC; Andreas Unterberger, Gernot Higatzberger, Stefan Markus, Hartwig Zimmerl, alternate: Hubert Gründhammer	CC Traun; Manuel Seidl, Boris Seidl, Elio Seidl, Georg Haindrich, alternate: Damir Srebric	21	—
2020; 9—22 oct.	Kitzbühel, Curlinghalle Sportpark	KCC; Sebastian Wunderer, Mathias Genner, Martin Reichel, Lukas Kirchmair, alternate: Philipp Nothegger	CFÖ; Markus Forejtek, Martin Egretzberger, Marcus Schmitt, Oliver Schöner	OCC; Andreas Unterberger, Gernot Higatzberger, Stefan Markus, Hartwig Zimmerl	—	—
2021	not held because COVID-19					

== See also ==
- Austrian Women's Curling Championship
- Austrian Mixed Curling Championship
- Austrian Mixed Doubles Curling Championship
- Austrian Junior Curling Championships
