= Günther Märker =

Austrian curler

- Curler ♂

Team
- Curling club: Kitzbühel CC, Kitzbühel

Curling career
- Member Association: Austria
- World Championship: 2 (1983, 1984)
Medal record
Curling
Austrian Men's Championship
Gold medal – first place	1983 Innsbruck
Gold medal – first place	1984 Stuttgart
Gold medal – first place	1998 Kitzbühel
Silver medal – second place	1985 Kitzbühel
Silver medal – second place	1993 Kitzbühel
Bronze medal – third place	1982 Oberstdorf
Bronze medal – third place	1994 Kitzbühel
Bronze medal – third place	1995 Kitzbühel
Bronze medal – third place	1996 Kitzbühel

Günther Märker (born c. 1942) is an Austrian male curler.

At the national level, he is a three-time Austrian men's champion curler.

At the time on the 1983 World Championship, he was employed as an insurance agent.

== Teams ==
Season	Skip	Third	Second	Lead	Alternate	Events
1981–82	Günther Märker	Herbert Dalik	Adolf Bachler	Walter Rossi		AMCC 1982 (bronze)
1982–83	Arthur Fabi	Günther Märker	Manfred Fabi	Dieter Küchenmeister		AMCC 1983 (gold); WCC 1983 (9th)
1983–84	Günther Märker	Roland Koudelka	Günther Mochny	Ernst Egger	Jakob Küchl (AMCC), Günther Hummelt (WCC)	AMCC 1984 (gold); WCC 1984 (10th)
1984–85	Günther Märker	Joachim Märker	Rupert Holzer	Roland Keuschnigg		AMCC 1985 (silver)
1992–93	Günther Märker	Joachim Märker	Mario Schipflinger	Markus Nothegger	Werner Wanker	AMCC 1993 (silver)
1993–94	Günther Märker	Joachim Märker	Markus Neumayr	Markus Nothegger		AMCC 1994 (bronze)
1994–95	Günther Märker	Werner Wanker	Oswald Hopfensberger	Martin Schweigl		AMCC 1995 (bronze)
1995–96	Günther Märker	Joachim Märker	Oswald Hopfensberger	Werner Wanker		AMCC 1996 (bronze)
1997–98	Günther Märker	Joachim Märker	Oswald Hopfensberger	Werner Wanker		AMCC 1998 (gold)
