= Annina von Planta =

Swiss curler

- Curler ♀

Team
- Curling club: Bern CC, Bern

Curling career
- Member Association: Switzerland
- European Championship: 1 (1996)
Medal record
Curling
European Championships
Gold medal – first place	1996 Copenhagen
Swiss Women's Championship
Gold medal – first place	1997

Annina von Planta is a former Swiss curler. She played lead on the Swiss rink, skipped by Mirjam Ott that won the 1996 European Curling Championship.

== Teams ==
Season	Skip	Third	Second	Lead	Alternate	Coach	Events
1996–97	Mirjam Ott	Marianne Flotron	Franziska von Känel	Caroline Balz	Annina von Planta	Erika Müller	ECC 1996 (gold)
1996–97	Mirjam Ott	Manuela Kormann	Franziska von Känel	Caroline Balz	Marianne Flotron, Annina von Planta		SWCC 1997 (gold)
