= Manfred Fabi =

Austrian curler

- Curler ♂

Team
- Curling club: Kitzbühel CC, Kitzbühel

Curling career
- Member Association: Austria
- World Championship: 1 (1983)
- European Championship: 1 (1981)
Medal record
Curling
Austrian Men's Championship
Gold medal – first place	1983 Innsbruck
Bronze medal – third place	1984 Stuttgart

Manfred Fabi (born c. 1953) is an Austrian male curler.

At the national level, he is a 1983 Austrian men's champion curler.

His father Arthur was the skip of his team.

== Teams ==
Season	Skip	Third	Second	Lead	Alternate	Events
1981–82	Arthur Fabi	Ludwig Karrer	Manfred Fabi	Dieter Küchenmeister		ECC 1981 (11th)
1981–82	Arthur Fabi	Manfred Fabi	Ludwig Karrer	Dieter Küchenmeister		AMCC 1982 (4th)
1982–83	Arthur Fabi	Günther Märker	Manfred Fabi	Dieter Küchenmeister		AMCC 1983 (gold); WCC 1983 (9th)
1983–84	Arthur Fabi	Konrad Wieser	Manfred Fabi	Dieter Küchenmeister	Christian Wieser	AMCC 1984 (bronze)
1984–85	Arthur Fabi	Alois Kreidl	Manfred Fabi	Dieter Küchenmeister		AMCC 1985 (5th)
