= 2012 Canadian Senior Curling Championships – Men's tournament =

2012 Canadian Senior Curling Championships Men's tournament
- Host city: Abbotsford, British Columbia
- Arena: Abbotsford Recreation Centre
- Dates: March 17–25
- Winner: Alberta
- Curling club: Red Deer Curling Centre, Red Deer
- Skip: Rob Armitage
- Third: Randy Ponich
- Second: Wilf Edgar
- Lead: Keith Glover
- Finalist: Newfoundland and Labrador (Glenn Goss)

The men's tournament of the 2012 Canadian Senior Curling Championships was held from March 17 to 25.

== Qualifying round ==
Four associations did not automatically qualify to the championships, and participated in a qualifying round held at the Langley Curling Club in Langley, British Columbia. Two qualification spots were awarded to the winners of a double knockout round.

=== Teams ===
The teams are listed as follows:

Province	Skip	Third	Second	Lead	Locale
New Brunswick	Mark Armstrong	John Guy Boudreau	Terry Roach	Bill Gates	Riverside Country Club, Rothesay
Northwest Territories	Glen Hudy	Brian Kelin	Ben McDonald	Ritch Klakowitch	Yellowknife Curling Centre, Yellowknife
Yukon	George Hilderman	Gord Zealand	Pat Molloy	Bob Walker	Whitehorse Curling Club, Whitehorse

*Nunavut did not enter a team in the qualifying round.

=== Knockout brackets ===
Semifinals			Qualifier 1
2	Yukon	L
3	Northwest Territories	W	3	Northwest Territories	L
			1	New Brunswick	W

Qualifier 2
2	Yukon	W
3	Northwest Territories	L

=== Knockout results ===
All times listed are in Pacific Standard Time.

==== First knockout ====
Thursday, March 15, 9:00 am

Sheet 1	Final
Yukon (Hilderman)	L
Northwest Territories (Hudy)	W

Thursday, March 15, 2:00 pm

Sheet 4	Final
Northwest Territories (Hudy)	L
New Brunswick (Armstrong)	W

==== Second knockout ====
Thursday, March 15, 7:00 pm

Sheet 5	Final
Yukon (Hilderman)	W
Northwest Territories (Hudy)	L

== Teams ==
The teams are listed as follows:

Province	Skip	Third	Second	Lead	Locale
Alberta	Rob Armitage	Randy Ponich	Wilf Edgar	Keith Glover	Red Deer Curling Centre, Red Deer
British Columbia	Brian Windsor (fourth)	Dennis Graber (skip)	Garnet Boese	David Johnston	Prince George Curling Club, Prince George
Manitoba	Kelly Robertson	Doug Armour	Peter Prokopowich	Bob Scales	Neepawa Curling Club, Neepawa
New Brunswick	Mark Armstrong	John Guy Boudreau	Terry Roach	Bill Gates	Riverside Country Club, Rothesay
Newfoundland and Labrador	Geoff Cunningham (fourth)	Glenn Goss (skip)	Rob Thomas	Gary Tiller	RE/MAX Centre, St. John's
Northern Ontario	Robbie Gordon	Ron Henderson	Dion Dumontelle	Doug Hong	Sudbury Curling Club, Sudbury
Nova Scotia	Dave McCusker	Mike Hemsworth	John Flinn	Scott Moulton	Mayflower Curling Club, Halifax
Ontario	Brian Lewis	Jeff McCrady	Steve Doty	Graham Sinclair	Ottawa Curling Club, Ottawa
Prince Edward Island	Charlie Wilkinson	Ken McGregor	Phil McInnis	Bill Doherty	Charlottetown Curling Club, Charlottetown
Quebec	Pierre Charette	Richard Faguy	Louis Biron	Maurice Cayouette	Buckingham Curling Club, Buckingham
Saskatchewan	Eugene Hritzuk	Brent Kolodziejski	Verne Anderson	Dave Folk	Nutana Curling Club, Saskatoon
Yukon	George Hilderman	Gord Zealand	Pat Molloy	Bob Walker	Whitehorse Curling Club, Whitehorse

== Round-robin standings ==
Final round-robin standings

Key
Teams to Playoffs

Province	Skip	W	L
Alberta	Rob Armitage	10	1
Newfoundland and Labrador	Glenn Goss	8	3
Ontario	Brian Lewis	8	3
British Columbia	Dennis Graber	7	4
Northern Ontario	Robbie Gordon	7	4
Manitoba	Kelly Robertson	6	5
Quebec	Pierre Charette	5	6
Saskatchewan	Eugene Hritzuk	5	6
New Brunswick	Mark Armstrong	4	7
Nova Scotia	Dave McCusker	3	8
Prince Edward Island	Charlie Wilkinson	2	9
Yukon	George Hilderman	1	10

== Round-robin results ==
All times listed are in Pacific Standard Time.

=== Draw 2 ===
Saturday, March 17, 1:30 pm

Sheet A	1	2	3	4	5	6	7	8	9	10	Final
Newfoundland and Labrador (Goss)	1	0	1	1	0	2	0	4	X	X	9
Quebec (Charette)	0	0	0	0	3	0	1	0	X	X	4

Sheet B	1	2	3	4	5	6	7	8	9	10	Final
Alberta (Armitage)	3	0	1	0	3	2	1	0	X	X	10
Prince Edward Island (Wilkinson)	0	1	0	1	0	0	0	2	X	X	4

Sheet C	1	2	3	4	5	6	7	8	9	10	Final
Nova Scotia (McCusker)	1	0	0	2	2	0	0	0	1	0	6
Northern Ontario (Gordon)	0	1	2	0	0	2	0	0	0	2	7

Sheet D	1	2	3	4	5	6	7	8	9	10	Final
Yukon (Hilderman)	0	0	1	0	0	1	0	0	0	X	2
British Columbia (Graber)	1	1	0	2	1	0	1	1	1	X	8

Sheet E	1	2	3	4	5	6	7	8	9	10	Final
Manitoba (Robertson)	0	0	0	3	1	0	0	3	0	1	8
Ontario (Lewis)	0	1	0	0	0	2	0	0	2	0	5

Sheet F	1	2	3	4	5	6	7	8	9	10	Final
Saskatchewan (Hritzuk)	0	0	2	0	2	1	0	5	X	X	10
New Brunswick (Armstrong)	0	1	0	1	0	0	1	0	X	X	3

=== Draw 4 ===
Sunday, March 18, 9:00 am

Sheet A	1	2	3	4	5	6	7	8	9	10	Final
Yukon (Hilderman)	0	1	0	0	1	0	1	0	2	0	5
Manitoba (Robertson)	2	0	0	1	0	1	0	2	0	1	7

Sheet B	1	2	3	4	5	6	7	8	9	10	Final
British Columbia (Graber)	0	3	0	2	4	0	0	1	0	0	10
Nova Scotia (McCusker)	1	0	1	0	0	1	2	0	2	0	7

Sheet C	1	2	3	4	5	6	7	8	9	10	Final
Saskatchewan (Hritzuk)	0	0	1	0	0	0	1	0	2	1	5
Newfoundland and Labrador (Goss)	1	0	0	2	0	2	0	2	0	0	7

Sheet D	1	2	3	4	5	6	7	8	9	10	Final
Prince Edward Island (Wilkinson)	0	1	0	0	0	1	0	0	2	X	4
New Brunswick (Armstrong)	1	0	0	1	1	0	5	0	0	X	8

Sheet E	1	2	3	4	5	6	7	8	9	10	Final
Alberta (Armitage)	0	1	0	0	0	2	0	4	0	1	8
Quebec (Charette)	1	0	1	0	1	0	1	0	1	0	5

Sheet F	1	2	3	4	5	6	7	8	9	10	11	Final
Northern Ontario (Gordon)	0	3	0	0	1	0	0	0	0	1	0	5
Ontario (Lewis)	0	0	1	0	0	1	2	1	0	0	1	6

=== Draw 5 ===
Sunday, March 18, 1:30 pm

Sheet A	1	2	3	4	5	6	7	8	9	10	Final
British Columbia (Graber)	0	0	0	2	0	2	0	0	1	X	5
Prince Edward Island (Wilkinson)	1	1	1	0	3	0	2	1	0	X	9

Sheet B	1	2	3	4	5	6	7	8	9	10	Final
Saskatchewan (Hritzuk)	1	0	0	0	0	0	2	1	X	X	4
Quebec (Charette)	0	2	1	3	1	1	0	0	X	X	8

Sheet D	1	2	3	4	5	6	7	8	9	10	Final
Manitoba (Robertson)	1	0	1	0	0	1	0	2	0	0	5
Northern Ontario (Gordon)	0	1	0	0	1	0	2	0	0	2	6

=== Draw 6 ===
Sunday, March 18, 7:00 pm

Sheet C	1	2	3	4	5	6	7	8	9	10	Final
Yukon (Hilderman)	1	0	1	0	1	0	0	1	X	X	4
Ontario (Lewis)	0	3	0	3	0	0	3	0	X	X	9

Sheet E	1	2	3	4	5	6	7	8	9	10	Final
Nova Scotia (McCusker)	0	0	1	2	0	1	0	1	1	X	6
New Brunswick (Armstrong)	2	0	0	0	0	0	1	0	0	X	3

Sheet F	1	2	3	4	5	6	7	8	9	10	Final
Newfoundland and Labrador (Goss)	0	1	0	0	3	0	0	0	0	X	4
Alberta (Armitage)	1	0	2	0	0	3	0	2	1	X	9

=== Draw 7 ===
Monday, March 19, 8:00 am

Sheet A	1	2	3	4	5	6	7	8	9	10	Final
Quebec (Charette)	2	1	0	1	0	0	1	0	2	X	7
Northern Ontario (Gordon)	0	0	0	0	1	0	0	1	0	X	2

Sheet C	1	2	3	4	5	6	7	8	9	10	Final
Manitoba (Robertson)	2	0	2	1	0	2	0	0	3	X	10
Prince Edward Island (Wilkinson)	0	2	0	0	1	0	0	2	0	X	5

Sheet E	1	2	3	4	5	6	7	8	9	10	Final
Saskatchewan (Hritzuk)	0	0	0	0	1	1	0	1	2	0	5
British Columbia (Graber)	0	0	0	2	0	0	2	0	0	2	6

=== Draw 8 ===
Monday, March 19, 12:00 pm

Sheet B	1	2	3	4	5	6	7	8	9	10	Final
New Brunswick (Armstrong)	1	0	0	0	1	0	2	0	X	X	4
Alberta (Armitage)	0	3	2	1	0	2	0	2	X	X	10

Sheet D	1	2	3	4	5	6	7	8	9	10	Final
Ontario (Lewis)	1	0	2	0	1	0	0	1	0	X	5
Newfoundland and Labrador (Goss)	0	2	0	3	0	1	2	0	2	X	10

Sheet F	1	2	3	4	5	6	7	8	9	10	Final
Nova Scotia (McCusker)	0	3	0	1	0	1	1	2	1	X	9
Yukon (Hilderman)	1	0	1	0	1	0	0	0	0	X	3

=== Draw 9 ===
Monday, March 19, 4:30 pm

Sheet D	1	2	3	4	5	6	7	8	9	10	Final
British Columbia (Graber)	0	0	0	2	2	0	2	0	3	0	9
Quebec (Charette)	0	2	2	0	0	1	0	1	0	1	7

Sheet E	1	2	3	4	5	6	7	8	9	10	Final
Northern Ontario (Gordon)	0	2	0	0	2	0	0	1	1	0	6
Prince Edward Island (Wilkinson)	0	0	1	0	0	0	1	0	0	0	2

Sheet F	1	2	3	4	5	6	7	8	9	10	Final
Manitoba (Robertson)	0	0	0	1	0	1	0	X	X	X	2
Saskatchewan (Hritzuk)	2	4	1	0	4	0	0	X	X	X	11

=== Draw 10 ===
Monday, March 19, 8:30 pm

Sheet A	1	2	3	4	5	6	7	8	9	10	Final
New Brunswick (Armstrong)	0	1	0	1	0	2	0	1	0	X	5
Ontario (Lewis)	3	0	2	0	3	0	1	0	3	X	12

Sheet B	1	2	3	4	5	6	7	8	9	10	Final
Newfoundland and Labrador (Goss)	0	2	0	3	0	0	1	0	3	X	9
Yukon (Hilderman)	1	0	1	0	2	1	0	2	0	X	7

Sheet C	1	2	3	4	5	6	7	8	9	10	Final
Alberta (Armitage)	0	0	2	2	1	0	2	0	2	X	9
Nova Scotia (McCusker)	0	2	0	0	0	1	0	1	0	X	4

=== Draw 11 ===
Tuesday, March 20, 9:00 am

Sheet D	1	2	3	4	5	6	7	8	9	10	Final
Saskatchewan (Hritzuk)	2	1	1	1	1	3	1	X	X	X	10
Prince Edward Island (Wilkinson)	0	0	0	0	0	0	0	X	X	X	0

Sheet E	1	2	3	4	5	6	7	8	9	10	Final
Quebec (Charette)	1	1	0	2	0	2	0	0	4	X	10
Manitoba (Robertson)	0	0	1	0	3	0	1	2	0	X	7

Sheet F	1	2	3	4	5	6	7	8	9	10	11	Final
British Columbia (Graber)	0	0	0	0	0	0	1	1	1	0	2	5
Northern Ontario (Gordon)	1	0	0	0	1	0	0	0	0	1	0	3

=== Draw 12 ===
Tuesday, March 20, 1:30 pm

Sheet A	1	2	3	4	5	6	7	8	9	10	Final
Alberta (Armitage)	1	0	2	0	0	3	1	0	2	X	9
Yukon (Hilderman)	0	1	0	1	0	0	0	3	0	X	5

Sheet B	1	2	3	4	5	6	7	8	9	10	Final
Nova Scotia (McCusker)	0	0	0	1	1	1	0	0	1	X	4
Ontario (Lewis)	0	2	1	0	0	0	3	1	0	X	7

Sheet C	1	2	3	4	5	6	7	8	9	10	Final
Newfoundland and Labrador (Goss)	1	0	2	1	2	2	0	1	0	X	9
New Brunswick (Armstrong)	0	3	0	0	0	0	1	0	1	X	5

=== Draw 13 ===
Tuesday, March 20, 6:30 pm

Sheet B	1	2	3	4	5	6	7	8	9	10	Final
Manitoba (Robertson)	0	1	0	1	0	1	0	0	X	X	3
British Columbia (Graber)	1	0	2	0	2	0	2	2	X	X	9

Sheet C	1	2	3	4	5	6	7	8	9	10	Final
Northern Ontario (Gordon)	0	1	1	0	0	3	0	1	1	X	7
Saskatchewan (Hritzuk)	1	0	0	3	0	0	1	0	0	X	5

Sheet F	1	2	3	4	5	6	7	8	9	10	Final
Quebec (Charette)	2	3	2	2	1	0	0	X	X	X	10
Prince Edward Island (Wilkinson)	0	0	0	0	0	1	0	X	X	X	1

=== Draw 14 ===
Wednesday, March 21, 9:00 am

Sheet A	1	2	3	4	5	6	7	8	9	10	Final
Nova Scotia (McCusker)	0	0	0	0	0	0	2	0	0	X	2
Newfoundland and Labrador (Goss)	0	1	1	1	1	1	0	2	1	X	8

Sheet D	1	2	3	4	5	6	7	8	9	10	Final
New Brunswick (Armstrong)	0	0	2	0	0	1	2	0	0	1	6
Yukon (Hilderman)	0	1	0	1	1	0	0	1	1	0	5

Sheet E	1	2	3	4	5	6	7	8	9	10	Final
Ontario (Lewis)	0	2	0	1	0	3	0	1	X	X	7
Alberta (Armitage)	0	0	0	0	1	0	2	0	X	X	3

=== Draw 16 ===
Wednesday, March 21, 6:30 pm

Sheet A	1	2	3	4	5	6	7	8	9	10	11	Final
Ontario (Lewis)	1	0	0	1	0	2	0	0	1	1	0	6
British Columbia (Graber)	0	1	1	0	2	0	1	1	0	0	1	7

Sheet B	1	2	3	4	5	6	7	8	9	10	Final
Quebec (Charette)	0	1	0	1	1	0	1	0	0	X	4
New Brunswick (Armstrong)	2	0	2	0	0	1	0	0	4	X	9

Sheet C	1	2	3	4	5	6	7	8	9	10	Final
Prince Edward Island (Wilkinson)	2	0	1	0	0	1	0	2	0	1	7
Yukon (Hilderman)	0	1	0	2	0	0	1	0	2	0	6

Sheet D	1	2	3	4	5	6	7	8	9	10	Final
Nova Scotia (McCusker)	0	1	0	2	0	0	1	0	1	0	5
Saskatchewan (Hritzuk)	1	0	1	0	1	0	0	2	0	1	6

Sheet E	1	2	3	4	5	6	7	8	9	10	Final
Newfoundland and Labrador (Goss)	0	2	0	0	0	0	1	1	X	X	4
Northern Ontario (Gordon)	3	0	1	0	3	1	0	0	X	X	8

Sheet F	1	2	3	4	5	6	7	8	9	10	Final
Alberta (Armitage)	2	0	0	0	2	0	0	2	0	1	7
Manitoba (Robertson)	0	1	0	0	0	2	1	0	1	0	5

=== Draw 18 ===
Thursday, March 22, 1:30 pm

Sheet A	1	2	3	4	5	6	7	8	9	10	Final
Northern Ontario (Gordon)	0	0	2	0	3	0	2	2	0	X	9
New Brunswick (Armstrong)	0	1	0	1	0	2	0	0	1	X	5

Sheet B	1	2	3	4	5	6	7	8	9	10	Final
Ontario (Lewis)	0	2	0	2	0	2	0	2	0	1	9
Saskatchewan (Hritzuk)	1	0	1	0	1	0	2	0	1	0	6

Sheet C	1	2	3	4	5	6	7	8	9	10	Final
British Columbia (Graber)	0	0	1	0	0	0	0	1	0	X	2
Alberta (Armitage)	1	0	0	2	0	2	1	0	1	X	7

Sheet D	1	2	3	4	5	6	7	8	9	10	Final
Newfoundland and Labrador (Goss)	1	0	0	1	0	0	0	0	1	0	3
Manitoba (Robertson)	0	1	1	0	0	0	1	1	0	2	6

Sheet E	1	2	3	4	5	6	7	8	9	10	Final
Prince Edward Island (Wilkinson)	0	0	0	0	0	1	0	X	X	X	1
Nova Scotia (McCusker)	2	2	1	3	1	0	2	X	X	X	11

Sheet F	1	2	3	4	5	6	7	8	9	10	Final
Yukon (Hilderman)	0	2	1	0	1	0	0	1	0	1	6
Quebec (Charette)	0	0	0	1	0	2	0	0	1	0	4

=== Draw 20 ===
Friday, March 23, 9:00 am

Sheet A	1	2	3	4	5	6	7	8	9	10	Final
Saskatchewan (Hritzuk)	0	1	0	2	1	0	0	2	1	X	7
Alberta (Armitage)	1	0	2	0	0	3	3	0	0	X	9

Sheet B	1	2	3	4	5	6	7	8	9	10	Final
Yukon (Hilderman)	0	0	0	1	1	0	0	1	0	X	3
Northern Ontario (Gordon)	3	1	1	0	0	1	1	0	1	X	6

Sheet C	1	2	3	4	5	6	7	8	9	10	Final
New Brunswick (Armstrong)	0	0	1	0	2	1	0	X	X	X	4
Manitoba (Robertson)	0	3	0	4	0	0	2	X	X	X	9

Sheet D	1	2	3	4	5	6	7	8	9	10	Final
Quebec (Charette)	1	3	1	3	0	2	0	X	X	X	10
Nova Scotia (McCusker)	0	0	0	0	2	0	1	X	X	X	3

Sheet E	1	2	3	4	5	6	7	8	9	10	Final
British Columbia (Graber)	1	0	0	0	2	0	0	1	0	X	4
Newfoundland and Labrador (Goss)	0	2	0	1	0	2	1	0	1	X	7

Sheet F	1	2	3	4	5	6	7	8	9	10	Final
Prince Edward Island (Wilkinson)	0	1	0	1	0	0	0	X	X	X	2
Ontario (Lewis)	2	0	3	0	3	2	1	X	X	X	11

=== Draw 22 ===
Friday, March 23, 6:30 pm

Sheet A	1	2	3	4	5	6	7	8	9	10	Final
Manitoba (Robertson)	0	2	0	3	0	2	0	0	1	0	8
Nova Scotia (McCusker)	0	0	2	0	1	0	0	1	0	0	4

Sheet B	1	2	3	4	5	6	7	8	9	10	Final
Prince Edward Island (Wilkinson)	0	0	0	0	2	0	2	0	1	0	5
Newfoundland and Labrador (Goss)	0	1	1	0	0	1	0	2	0	1	6

Sheet C	1	2	3	4	5	6	7	8	9	10	Final
Ontario (Lewis)	0	1	1	0	2	0	1	1	3	X	9
Quebec (Charette)	0	0	0	1	0	2	0	0	0	X	3

Sheet D	1	2	3	4	5	6	7	8	9	10	Final
Northern Ontario (Gordon)	0	1	0	1	0	1	0	1	0	1	5
Alberta (Armitage)	0	0	1	0	1	0	3	0	2	0	7

Sheet E	1	2	3	4	5	6	7	8	9	10	Final
Yukon (Hilderman)	0	0	0	1	0	1	0	X	X	X	2
Saskatchewan (Hritzuk)	0	1	0	0	4	0	4	X	X	X	9

Sheet F	1	2	3	4	5	6	7	8	9	10	Final
New Brunswick (Armstrong)	0	1	1	0	0	5	0	1	0	1	9
British Columbia (Graber)	0	0	0	1	0	0	2	0	4	0	7

== Playoffs ==
Semifinal			Final
			1	Alberta	5
2	Newfoundland and Labrador	10	2	Newfoundland and Labrador	2
3	Ontario	4

=== Semifinal ===
Saturday, March 24, 7:00 pm

Sheet D	1	2	3	4	5	6	7	8	9	10	Final
Newfoundland and Labrador (Goss)	0	4	1	1	0	1	0	3	X	X	10
Ontario (Lewis)	0	0	0	0	2	0	2	0	X	X	4

=== Final ===
Sunday, March 25, 11:00 am

Sheet D	1	2	3	4	5	6	7	8	9	10	Final
Alberta (Armitage)	0	2	0	0	1	2	0	0	0	X	5
Newfoundland and Labrador (Goss)	0	0	1	0	0	0	0	1	0	X	2

2012 Canadian Senior Men's Curling Championship Winner
(Alberta)
Alberta
7th title
