= Dieter Küchenmeister =

Austrian curler and sports executive (1935–2011)

- Curler ♂
- Born: 13 October 1935; Chemnitz, Germany
- Died: 22 September 2011 (aged 75); Kitzbühel, Austria

Team
- Curling club: Kitzbühel CC, Kitzbühel

Curling career
- Member Association: Austria
- World Championship: 1 (1983)
- European Championship: 10 (1981, 1987, 1988, 1989, 1990, 1993, 1994, 1995, 1996, 1997)
Medal record
Curling
Austrian Men's Championship
| Gold medal – first place | 1983 Innsbruck |
| Gold medal – first place | 1987 Kitzbühel |
| Gold medal – first place | 1988 Kitzbühel |
| Gold medal – first place | 1989 Kitzbühel |
| Gold medal – first place | 1990 Kitzbühel |
| Silver medal – second place | 1992 Kitzbühel |
| Bronze medal – third place | 1984 Stuttgart |

Hellmuth Dieter Küchenmeister (13 October 1935 – 22 September 2011) was an Austrian male curler and sports executive.

At the national level, he is a five-time Austrian men's champion curler.

In the 1950s and 1960s, he was an ice hockey player for EC Kitzbühel, winning silver and bronze medals at the Austrian championship.

As a sports executive, he was co-founder of Austrian Curling Federation in 1980, long-time president of Kitzbühel Curling Club and long-time director of the Austrian Open Kitzbühel international tennis tournament.

== Teams ==
| Season | Skip | Third | Second | Lead | Alternate | Events |
|---|---|---|---|---|---|---|
| 1981–82 | Arthur Fabi | Ludwig Karrer | Manfred Fabi | Dieter Küchenmeister | | ECC 1981 (11th) |
| 1981–82 | Arthur Fabi | Manfred Fabi | Ludwig Karrer | Dieter Küchenmeister | | AMCC 1982 (4th) |
| 1982–83 | Arthur Fabi | Günther Märker | Manfred Fabi | Dieter Küchenmeister | | AMCC 1983 (gold); WCC 1983 (9th) |
| 1983–84 | Arthur Fabi | Konrad Wieser | Manfred Fabi | Dieter Küchenmeister | Christian Wieser | AMCC 1984 (bronze) |
| 1984–85 | Arthur Fabi | Alois Kreidl | Manfred Fabi | Dieter Küchenmeister | | AMCC 1985 (5th) |
| 1986–87 | Alois Kreidl | Günther Mochny | Dieter Küchenmeister | Stefan Salinger | | AMCC 1987 (gold) |
| 1987–88 | Alois Kreidl | Günther Mochny | Dieter Küchenmeister | Stefan Salinger | | ECC 1987 (9th); AMCC 1988 (gold) |
| 1988–89 | Alois Kreidl | Günther Mochny | Dieter Küchenmeister | Stefan Salinger | | ECC 1988 (9th) |
| 1988–89 | Alois Kreidl | Thomas Wieser | Dieter Küchenmeister | Stefan Salinger | | AMCC 1989 (gold) |
| 1989–90 | Alois Kreidl | Thomas Wieser | Dieter Küchenmeister | Stefan Salinger | | ECC 1989 (7th) |
| 1990–91 | Alois Kreidl | Günther Mochny | Dieter Küchenmeister | Stefan Salinger | | ECC 1990 (12th) |
| 1991–92 | Alois Kreidl | Thomas Wieser | Stefan Salinger | Dieter Küchenmeister | | AMCC 1992 (silver) |
| 1993–94 | Alois Kreidl | Ronald Koudelka | Stefan Salinger | Richard Obermoser | Dieter Küchenmeister | ECC 1993 (13th) |
| 1994–95 | Alois Kreidl | Thomas Wieser | Stefan Salinger | Richard Obermoser | Dieter Küchenmeister | ECC 1994 (12th) |
| 1995–96 | Alois Kreidl | Stefan Salinger | Richard Obermoser | Franz Huber | Dieter Küchenmeister | ECC 1995 (10th) |
| 1996–97 | Alois Kreidl | Stefan Salinger | Richard Obermoser | Franz Huber | Dieter Küchenmeister | ECC 1996 (9th) |
| 1997–98 | Alois Kreidl | Stefan Salinger | Franz Huber | Richard Obermoser | Dieter Küchenmeister | ECC 1997 (14th) |
