= Marianne Flotron =

Swiss curler

- Curler ♀

Team
- Curling club: Bern CC, Bern

Curling career
- Member Association: Switzerland
- World Championship: 2 (1987, 1997)
- European Championship: 3 (1989, 1992, 1996)
Medal record
Curling
World Championships
Bronze medal – third place	1987 Chicago
European Championships
Gold medal – first place	1996 Copenhagen
Silver medal – second place	1989 Engelberg
Swiss Women's Championship
Gold medal – first place	1987
Gold medal – first place	1997

Marianne Flotron is a former Swiss curler.

She is a former European champion (1996).

She started curling in 1979.

== Teams ==
Season	Skip	Third	Second	Lead	Alternate	Coach	Events
1984	Marianne Flotron	Beatrice Arnold	Beatrice Frei	Jacky Zenhäusern			SJCC 1984 (gold)
1984	Marianne Flotron	Beatrice Arnold	Beatrice Frei	Diana Meichtry			EJCC 1984 (4th)
1986	Marianne Flotron	Sandra Burkhard	Beatrice Frei	Gisela Peter			SJCC 1986 (gold); EJCC 1986 (gold)
1986–87	Marianne Flotron	Gisela Peter	Beatrice Frei	Caroline Rück			SWCC 1987 (gold); WCC 1987 (bronze)
1989–90	Marianne Flotron	Daniela Sartori	Esther Christen	Caroline Rück			ECC 1989 (silver)
1992–93	Marianne Flotron	Tatjana Stadler	Nicole Oetliker	Esther Christen			ECC 1992 (6th)
1996–97	Mirjam Ott	Marianne Flotron	Franziska von Känel	Caroline Balz	Annina von Planta	Erika Müller	ECC 1996 (gold)
1996–97	Mirjam Ott	Manuela Kormann	Franziska von Känel	Caroline Balz	Marianne Flotron		SWCC 1997 (gold); WCC 1997 (8th)
