= Roland Koudelka =

Austrian curler and coach

- Curler ♂
- Born: 15 April 1938
- Died: 16 December 2016 (aged 78)

Team
- Curling club: Kitzbühel CC, Kitzbühel

Curling career
- Member Association: Austria
- World Championship: 1 (1984)
- European Championship: 4 (1982, 1991, 1993, 2004)
Medal record
Curling
Austrian Men's Championship
Gold medal – first place	1982 Oberstdorf
Gold medal – first place	1984 Stuttgart
Gold medal – first place	1991 Kitzbühel
Gold medal – first place	1993 Kitzbühel
Silver medal – second place	1983 Innsbruck
Silver medal – second place	1996 Kitzbühel

Roland Koudelka (15 April 1938 – 16 December 2016) was an Austrian curler and curling coach.

At the national level, he was a four-time Austrian men's champion and a two-time silver medallist of Austrian mixed championship.

He was married to fellow Austrian champion curler and coach Edeltraud "Traudi" Koudelka.

== Teams ==
=== Men's ===
Season	Skip	Third	Second	Lead	Alternate	Coach	Events
1981–82	Jakob Küchl	Roland Koudelka	Günther Mochny	Otto Hölzl			AMCC 1982 (gold)
1982–83	Günther Mochny	Roland Koudelka	Arthur Fabi	Jakob Küchl			ECC 1982 (11th)
1982–83	Jakob Küchl	Roland Koudelka	Günther Mochny	Ernst Egger			AMCC 1983 (silver)
1983–84	Günther Märker	Roland Koudelka	Günther Mochny	Ernst Egger	Jakob Küchl (AMCC), Günther Hummelt (WCC)		AMCC 1984 (gold); WCC 1984 (10th)
1990–91	Jakob Küchl	Roland Koudelka	Ludwig Karrer	Adolf Bachler			AMCC 1991 (gold)
1991–92	Jakob Küchl	Roland Koudelka	Richard Obermoser	Adolf Bachler			ECC 1991 (10th)
1992–93	Alois Kreidl	Thomas Wieser	Stefan Salinger	Roland Koudelka			AMCC 1993 (gold)
1993–94	Alois Kreidl	Roland Koudelka	Stefan Salinger	Richard Obermoser	Dieter Küchenmeister		ECC 1993 (13th)
1995–96	Jakob Küchl	Roland Koudelka	Wolfgang Schober	Walter Egger			AMCC 1996 (silver)
2004–05	Alois Kreidl	Stefan Salinger	Nikolaus Gasteiger	Werner Wanker	Roland Koudelka	Roland Koudelka	ECC 2004 (15th)

=== Mixed ===
Season	Skip	Third	Second	Lead	Events
2005–06	Roland Koudelka	Margit Holzer	Rupert Holzer	Edeltraud Koudelka	AMxCC 2005 (silver)
2006–07	Roland Koudelka	Margit Holzer	Rupert Holzer	Edeltraud Koudelka	AMxCC 2007 (silver)
2007–08	Roland Koudelka	Edeltraud Koudelka	Richard Obermoser	Heidlinde Gasteiger	AMxCC 2008 (5th)

== Record as a coach of national teams ==
Year	Tournament, event	National team	Place
1995	1995 European Curling Championships	Austria (women)	8
1996	1995 European Curling Championships	Austria (women)	11
2004	2004 European Curling Championships	Austria (men)	15
