= Red Deer Curling Classic =

- Established: 1992
- Host city: Red Deer, Alberta
- Arena: Red Deer Curling Club
- Men's purse: $46,000
- Women's purse: $39,000

Current champions (2026)
- Men: (Saskatchewan) Tyler Tardi
- Women: (Japan) Miyu Ueno

Location in Canada

The Red Deer Curling Classic is an annual bonspiel, or curling tournament, that takes place at the Red Deer Curling Club in Red Deer, Alberta. The tournament is held in a triple-knockout format. The men's tournament started in 1992 as a skins tournament. The women's tournament started in 1999 as a separate event held a few weeks earlier and merged with the men's event in 2007. The event was held as a World Curling Tour event until 2019 and has been held nearly every year since 2007. Curlers from Alberta have dominated the event on both sides since its inception. The event counts toward the Canadian Team Ranking System, which hands out points based on performances at CTRS events and deals with qualification to the Canadian Olympic Curling Trials.

The 2018 edition of the event made headlines for the ejection of Team Jamie Koe for "unacceptable behaviour", which included arriving to compete while clearly intoxicated.

== Event names ==
=== Men's ===
- 1992: Wheaton Chev-Olds Skins Invitational
- 1993: Scottsville Skins Game
- 1994–1995: Scottsville Classic
- 1996–2004: Terroco Classic
- 2005–2006: Meyers Norris Penny Cash Spiel

=== Women's ===
- 1999–2000: Parkland Savings Ladies Classic
- 2001–2006: Community Savings Ladies Classic

=== Combined ===
- 2007–2019: Red Deer Curling Classic
- 2021: Vesta Energy Curling Classic
- 2022: Prism Flow Red Deer Curling Classic
- 2023: Pumps and Pressure Red Deer Curling Classic
- 2024–present: Red Deer Curling Classic

== Past champions ==
Only skip's name is displayed.

=== Men ===
Year	Winning team	Runner up team	Purse (CAD)
1992	(Alberta) Lowell Peterman	(Alberta) Ed Lukowich	$18,600
1993	(Alberta) Mickey Pendergast	(Alberta) Marv Wirth	$17,500
1994	(Alberta) Adrian Bakker	(Saskatchewan) Gary Scheirich	$25,000
1995	(Alberta) Kevin Martin	(Alberta) Lorne Howard	$25,000
1996	(Alberta) Ken Hunka	(Alberta) Tracy Telford	$25,000
1997	(Alberta) Ken Hunka	(Alberta) Rob Schlender	$25,000
1998	(Alberta) Brent MacDonald	(Alberta) Terry Meek	$25,000
1999	(Alberta) Terry Meek	(Alberta) Brad Hannah	$28,200
2000	(Alberta) James Pahl	(Saskatchewan) Adrian Bakker	$45,000
2001	(Alberta) Jamie King	(Alberta) Brent MacDonald	$45,000
2002	(Alberta) Adrian Bakker	(British Columbia) Craig Lepine	$45,000
2003	(Alberta) Shane Park	(Alberta) Ted Appelman	$45,000
2004	(Alberta) Mark Johnson	(Alberta) Rob Schlender	$45,000
2005	(Alberta) Mark Johnson	(Alberta) Darren Moulding	$32,000
2006	(Alberta) Jamie King	(Alberta) Mark Johnson	$36,000
2007	(Alberta) Kurt Balderston	(Alberta) Rob Armitage	$32,000
2008	(Alberta) Ted Appelman	(Alberta) Dan Petryk	$26,800
2009	(Alberta) Randy Ferbey	(Alberta) Rob Armitage	$32,000
2010	(British Columbia) Jason Montgomery	(Alberta) Brent Bawel	$32,000
2011	(Alberta) Jamie King	(Northwest Territories) Jamie Koe	$32,000
2012	(Alberta) Brendan Bottcher	(Alberta) Kevin Koe	$33,000
2013	(Saskatchewan) Brock Virtue	(British Columbia) Jeff Richard	$38,000
2014	(Saskatchewan) Josh Heidt	(Alberta) Brock Virtue	$41,000
2015	(Alberta) Mick Lizmore	(Saskatchewan) Jason Ackerman	$39,000
2016	(Alberta) Kevin Koe	(Alberta) Ted Appelman	$39,000
2017	(Alberta) Brendan Bottcher	(Alberta) Ted Appelman	$39,000
2018	(Saskatchewan) Kody Hartung	(Alberta) Brendan Bottcher	$35,000
2019	(Alberta) James Pahl	(British Columbia) Tyler Tardi	$35,000
2020	Cancelled		
2021	(Alberta) Ryan Jacques	(Saskatchewan) Colton Flasch	$35,000
2022	(Manitoba) Matt Dunstone	(Alberta) Kevin Koe	$35,000
2023	(Alberta) Kevin Koe	(Saskatchewan) Rylan Kleiter	$35,000
2024	(Manitoba) Matt Dunstone	(Ontario) John Epping	$46,000
2025	(Alberta) Evan van Amsterdam	(Japan) Tsuyoshi Yamaguchi	$46,000
2026	(Saskatchewan) Tyler Tardi	(Alberta) Kevin Koe	$46,000

=== Women ===
Year	Winning team	Runner up team	Purse (CAD)
1999	(Saskatchewan) Sherry Anderson	(Alberta) Shannon Kleibrink	$30,000
2000	(Saskatchewan) Sherry Anderson	(Saskatchewan) Michelle Ridgway	$30,000
2001	(Saskatchewan) Amber Holland	(Alberta) Glenys Bakker	$30,000
2002	(Alberta) Heather Nedohin	(Alberta) Cheryl Bernard	$30,000
2003	(British Columbia) Kelly Scott	(Alberta) Renelle Bryden	$30,000
2004	(Alberta) Renelle Bryden	(Alberta) Shannon Kleibrink	$30,000
2005	(Alberta) Cathy King	(Alberta) Lawnie MacDonald	$30,000
2006	(Saskatchewan) Sherry Anderson	(British Columbia) Patti Knezevic	$30,000
2007	(Manitoba) Jennifer Jones	(Alberta) Kristie Moore	$32,000
2008	(Alberta) Cheryl Bernard	(Alberta) Shannon Kleibrink	$32,000
2009	(Manitoba) Jennifer Jones	(Alberta) Shannon Kleibrink	$33,000
2010	(Alberta) Shannon Kleibrink	(Alberta) Jessie Kaufman	$34,000
2011	(Switzerland) Silvana Tirinzoni	(British Columbia) Kelley Law	$34,000
2012	(Manitoba) Chelsea Carey	(Manitoba) Kaitlyn Lawes	$36,000
2013	(Switzerland) Binia Feltscher-Beeli	(Alberta) Kristie Moore	$38,000
2014	(Switzerland) Alina Pätz	(Saskatchewan) Trish Paulsen	$39,000
2015	(Alberta) Kelsey Rocque	(Switzerland) Alina Pätz	$31,000
2016	(Alberta) Nadine Chyz	(Scotland) Hannah Fleming	$29,000
2017	(Alberta) Delia DeJong	(Japan) Satsuki Fujisawa	$30,000
2018	(Saskatchewan) Robyn Silvernagle	(China) Mei Jie	$35,000
2019	(United States) Jamie Sinclair	(British Columbia) Brette Richards	$35,000
2020	Cancelled		
2021	(Japan) Satsuki Fujisawa	(South Korea) Gim Eun-ji	$35,000
2022	(Ontario) Tracy Fleury	(Alberta) Casey Scheidegger	$35,000
2023	(Ontario) Rachel Homan	(Alberta) Selena Sturmay	$35,000
2024	(Japan) Miku Nihira	(Japan) Satsuki Fujisawa	$39,000
2025	(Switzerland) Silvana Tirinzoni	(Japan) Miku Nihira	$39,000
2026	(Japan) Miyu Ueno	(Alberta) Kayla Skrlik	$39,000
