= Franziska von Känel =

Swiss curler

- Curler ♀

Team
- Curling club: Bern CC, Bern

Curling career
- Member Association: Switzerland
- World Championship: 1 (1997)
- European Championship: 1 (1996)
Medal record
Curling
European Championships
Gold medal – first place	1996 Copenhagen
Swiss Women's Championship
Gold medal – first place	1997
World Junior Curling Championships
Silver medal – second place	1988 Chamonix

Franziska von Känel is a former Swiss curler. She played second on the Swiss rink, skipped by Mirjam Ott that won the 1996 European Curling Championship. She was also a member of the Ott-led Swiss team at the 1997 World Women's Curling Championship which finished 8th.

== Teams ==
Season	Skip	Third	Second	Lead	Alternate	Coach	Events
1986–87	Marianne Amstutz	Sandra Bracher	Franziska von Känel	Stephanie Walter			SJCC 1987 (gold); EJCC 1987 (bronze)
1987–88	Marianne Amstutz	Sandra Bracher	Stephanie Walter	Franziska von Känel			WJCC 1988 (silver)
1996–97	Mirjam Ott	Marianne Flotron	Franziska von Känel	Caroline Balz	Annina von Planta	Erika Müller	ECC 1996 (gold)
1996–97	Mirjam Ott	Manuela Kormann	Franziska von Känel	Caroline Balz	Marianne Flotron		SWCC 1997 (gold); WCC 1997 (8th)
