= Richard Obermoser =

Austrian male curler

- Curler ♂

Team
- Curling club: Kitzbühel CC, Kitzbühel

Curling career
- Member Association: Austria
- World Championship: 1 (2002)
- European Championship: 6 (1991, 1993, 1994, 1995, 1996, 1997)

Richard Obermoser is an Austrian male curler.

== Teams ==
Season	Skip	Third	Second	Lead	Alternate	Events
1991–92	Jakob Küchl	Roland Koudelka	Richard Obermoser	Adolf Bachler		ECC 1991 (10th)
1993–94	Alois Kreidl	Roland Koudelka	Stefan Salinger	Richard Obermoser	Dieter Küchenmeister	ECC 1993 (13th)
1994–95	Alois Kreidl	Thomas Wieser	Stefan Salinger	Richard Obermoser	Dieter Küchenmeister	ECC 1994 (12th)
1995–96	Alois Kreidl	Stefan Salinger	Richard Obermoser	Franz Huber	Dieter Küchenmeister	ECC 1995 (10th)
1996–97	Alois Kreidl	Stefan Salinger	Richard Obermoser	Franz Huber	Dieter Küchenmeister	ECC 1996 (9th)
1997–98	Alois Kreidl	Stefan Salinger	Franz Huber	Richard Obermoser	Dieter Küchenmeister	ECC 1997 (14th)
2001–02	Alois Kreidl	Stefan Salinger	Andreas Unterberger	Werner Wanker	Richard Obermoser	WCC 2002 (10th)
