= Werner Wanker =

Austrian curler

Werner Wanker (born 8 April 1958) is an Austrian curler. He is the first thrower in the Kitzbühl CC team, which has often represented Austria in international competitions, and also "Österreichischer Curling Staatsmeister 2004".

At the national level, he is six-time Austrian men's champion curler.

== Teams ==
Season	Skip	Third	Second	Lead	Alternate	Coach	Events
1999–00	Alois Kreidl	Stefan Salinger	Franz Huber	Werner Wanker			ECC 1999 (15th)
2000–01	Alois Kreidl	Stefan Salinger	Andreas Unterberger	Werner Wanker			ECC 2000 (15th)
2001–02	Alois Kreidl	Stefan Salinger	Andreas Unterberger	Werner Wanker	Richard Obermoser (WCC)		ECC 2001 (11th); WCC 2002 (10th)
2002–03	Alois Kreidl	Stefan Salinger	Andreas Unterberger	Werner Wanker			ECC 2002 (10th)
2004–05	Alois Kreidl	Stefan Salinger	Nikolaus Gasteiger	Werner Wanker	Ronald Koudelka	Ronald Koudelka	ECC 2004 (15th)
2005–06	Alois Kreidl	Stefan Salinger	Nikolaus Gasteiger	Werner Wanker			ECC 2005 (19th)
