= Alois Kreidl =

Austrian curler (born 1960)

- Curler ♂
- Born: 25 March 1960 (age 66)

Team
- Curling club: Kitzbühel CC, Kitzbühel

Curling career
- Member Association: Austria
- World Championship: 1 (2002)
- European Championship: 17 (1983, 1987, 1988, 1989, 1990, 1993, 1994, 1995, 1996, 1997, 1999, 2000, 2001, 2002, 2004, 2005, 2008)

Alois Kreidl (born 25 March 1960) is an Austrian male curler.

At the national level, he is 19-time Austrian men's champion curler.

== Teams ==
Season	Skip	Third	Second	Lead	Alternate	Coach	Events
1983–84	Jakob Küchl	Günther Mochny	Alois Kreidl	Konrad Weiser			ECC 1983 (12th)
1987–88	Alois Kreidl	Günther Mochny	Dieter Küchenmeister	Stefan Salinger			ECC 1987 (9th)
1988–89	Alois Kreidl	Günther Mochny	Dieter Küchenmeister	Stefan Salinger			ECC 1988 (9th)
1989–90	Alois Kreidl	Thomas Wieser	Dieter Küchenmeister	Stefan Salinger			ECC 1989 (7th)
1990–91	Alois Kreidl	Günther Mochny	Dieter Küchenmeister	Stefan Salinger			ECC 1990 (12th)
1993–94	Alois Kreidl	Ronald Koudelka	Stefan Salinger	Richard Obermoser	Dieter Küchenmeister		ECC 1993 (13th)
1994–95	Alois Kreidl	Thomas Wieser	Stefan Salinger	Richard Obermoser	Dieter Küchenmeister		ECC 1994 (12th)
1995–96	Alois Kreidl	Stefan Salinger	Richard Obermoser	Franz Huber	Dieter Küchenmeister		ECC 1995 (10th)
1996–97	Alois Kreidl	Stefan Salinger	Richard Obermoser	Franz Huber	Dieter Küchenmeister		ECC 1996 (9th)
1997–98	Alois Kreidl	Stefan Salinger	Franz Huber	Richard Obermoser	Dieter Küchenmeister		ECC 1997 (14th)
1999–00	Alois Kreidl	Stefan Salinger	Franz Huber	Werner Wanker			ECC 1999 (15th)
2000–01	Alois Kreidl	Stefan Salinger	Andreas Unterberger	Werner Wanker			ECC 2000 (15th)
2001–02	Alois Kreidl	Stefan Salinger	Andreas Unterberger	Werner Wanker	Richard Obermoser (WCC)		ECC 2001 (11th); WCC 2002 (10th)
2002–03	Alois Kreidl	Stefan Salinger	Andreas Unterberger	Werner Wanker			ECC 2002 (10th)
2004–05	Alois Kreidl	Stefan Salinger	Nikolaus Gasteiger	Werner Wanker	Ronald Koudelka	Ronald Koudelka	ECC 2004 (15th)
2005–06	Alois Kreidl	Stefan Salinger	Nikolaus Gasteiger	Werner Wanker			ECC 2005 (19th)
2008–09	Alois Kreidl	Stefan Salinger	Max Ehammer	Hubert Gründhammer	Florian Lintner	Katja Weisser	ECC 2008 (24th)
