= Andreas Unterberger =

Austrian male curler and coach

- Curler ♂

Team
- Curling club: Kitzbühel CC, Kitzbühel

Curling career
- Member Association: Austria
- World Championship: 1 (2002)
- World Mixed Doubles Championship: 1 (2009)
- European Championship: 6 (2000, 2001, 2002, 2009, 2011, 2012)
- Other appearances: World Mixed Championship: 3 (2016, 2017, 2019), European Mixed Championship: 2 (2007, 2009)

Andreas Unterberger is an Austrian male curler and curling coach.

== Teams ==
=== Men's ===
Season	Skip	Third	Second	Lead	Alternate	Coach	Events
2000–01	Alois Kreidl	Stefan Salinger	Andreas Unterberger	Werner Wanker			ECC 2000 (15th)
2001–02	Alois Kreidl	Stefan Salinger	Andreas Unterberger	Werner Wanker	Richard Obermoser (WCC)		ECC 2001 (11th); WCC 2002 (10th)
2002–03	Alois Kreidl	Stefan Salinger	Andreas Unterberger	Werner Wanker			ECC 2002 (10th)
2009–10	Harald Fendt	Andreas Unterberger	Florian Huber	Dominik Bertsch	Christian Roth	Rodger Gustaf Schmidt	ECC 2009 (19th)
2011–12	Andreas Unterberger	Markus Forejtek	Marcus Schmitt	Martin Egretzberger	Christian Sokele	Rodger Gustaf Schmidt	ECC 2011 (15th)
2012–13	Andreas Unterberger	Markus Forejtek	Marcus Schmitt	Martin Egretzberger	Felix Purzner	Christian Roth, Uli Kapp	ECC 2012 (21st)

=== Mixed ===
Season	Skip	Third	Second	Lead	Alternate	Coach	Events
2007–08	Andreas Unterberger (fourth)	Claudia Toth (skip)	Florian Huber	Karina Toth	Constanze Hummelt		EMxCC 2007 (4th)
2009–10	Karina Toth	Andreas Unterberger	Jacqueline Greiner	Florian Huber			EMxCC 2009 (10th)
2016–17	Andreas Unterberger	Hannah Augustin	Gernot Higatzberger	Celine Moser			WMxCC 2016 (25th)
2017–18	Andreas Unterberger	Hannah Augustin	Gernot Higatzberger	Celine Moser		Sally Augustin	WMxCC 2017 (36th)
2019–20	Andreas Unterberger	Jill Witschen	Gernot Higatzberger	Johanna Höss		Björn Schröder	WMxCC 2019 (32nd)

=== Mixed doubles ===
Season	Male	Female	Events
2008–09	Andreas Unterberger	Karina Toth	WMDCC 2009 (21st)

== Record as a coach of national teams ==
Year	Tournament, event	National team	Place
2011	2011 European Curling Championships (group C)	Slovenia (men)	33 (total); 9 (group C)
2011	2011 European Curling Championships (group C)	Slovenia (women)	24 (total); 6 (group C)
2013	2013 World Senior Curling Championships	Austria (senior women)	2nd place, silver medalist(s)
2013	2013 European Curling Championships (group C)	Slovenia (men)	28 (total); 4 (group C)
2013	2013 European Curling Championships (group C)	Slovenia (women)	19 (total); (silver) (group C)
2014	2014 World Senior Curling Championships	Austria (senior women)	13
2016	2016 World Junior B Curling Championships	Austria (junior women)	21
