= Adolf Bachler =

Austrian ice hockey player

- Born: 29 April 1938 Kitzbühel, Austria
- Died: 17 May 2017 (aged 79)
- Position: Forward
- Played for: EC Kitzbühel
- National team: Austria

Adolf "Adi" Bachler (29 April 1938 – 17 May 2017) was an Austrian ice hockey forward. He played his entire professional career with EC Kitzbühel and was a regular member of the Austrian national team during the 1960s.

Bachler earned 42 caps for Austria and competed in multiple Ice Hockey World Championships. He was also part of the Austrian squad at the 1964 Winter Olympics held in Innsbruck.

After retiring from competition, Bachler contributed to youth development in Austrian ice hockey, serving as a coach and mentor.
