= Mirjam Ott =

Swiss curler (born 1972)

- Curler
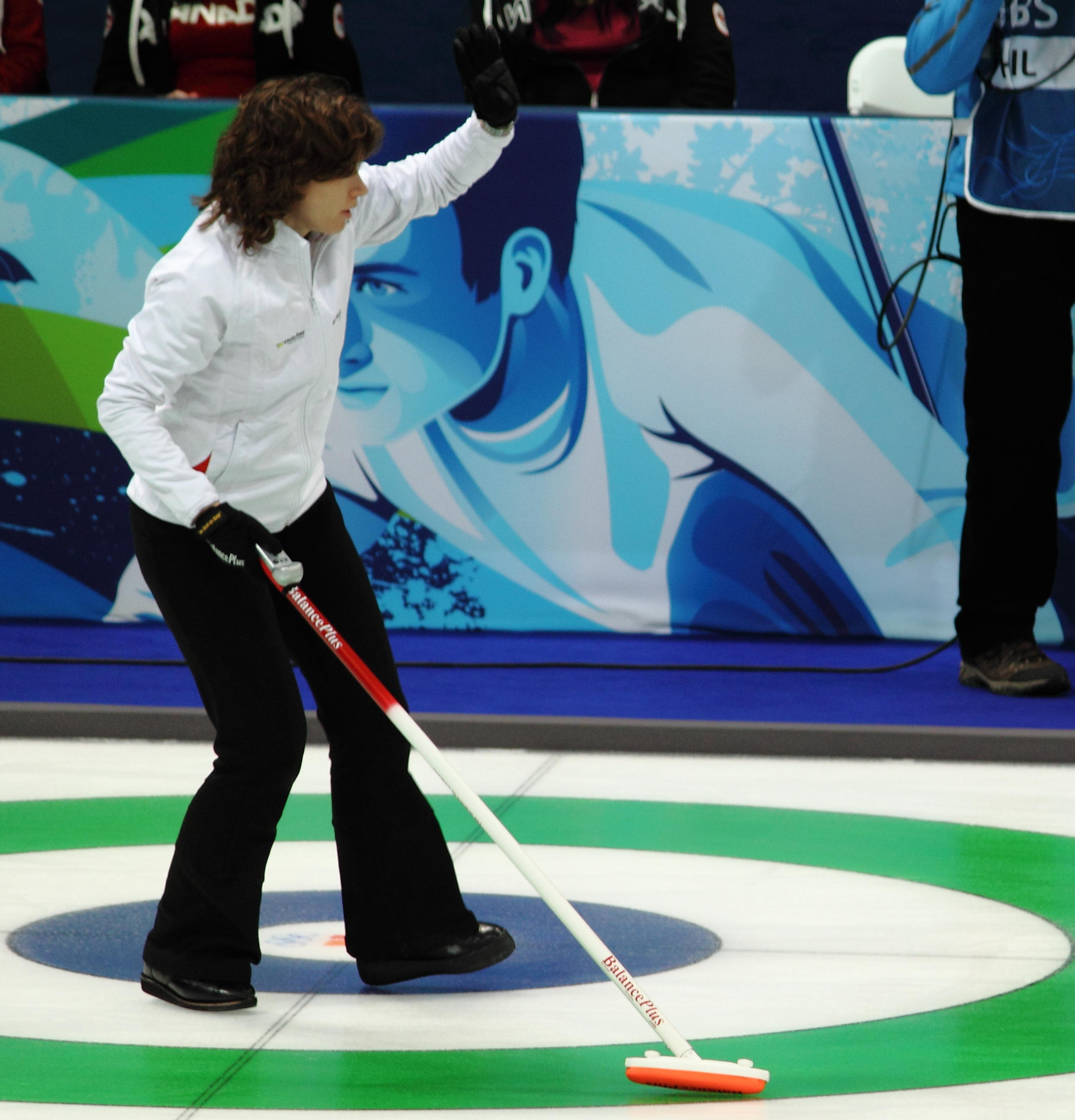
- Ott at the 2010 Winter Olympics
- Born: 27 January 1972 (age 54); Bern, Switzerland

Curling career
- Member Association: Switzerland
- World Championship: 7 (1997, 2005, 2007, 2008, 2009, 2011, 2012)
- European Championship: 11 (1996, 2001, 2004, 2005, 2006, 2007, 2008, 2009, 2010, 2012, 2013)
- Olympic: 4 (2002, 2006, 2010, 2014)
Medal record
Women's curling
Representing Switzerland
Winter Olympics
Silver medal – second place	2002 Salt Lake City
Silver medal – second place	2006 Turin
World Championships
Gold medal – first place	2012 Lethbridge
Bronze medal – third place	2008 Vernon
European Championships
Gold medal – first place	1996 Copenhagen
Gold medal – first place	2008 Örnsköldsvik
Silver medal – second place	2004 Sofia
Silver medal – second place	2005 Garmisch-Partenkirchen
Silver medal – second place	2009 Aberdeen
Bronze medal – third place	2001 Vierumäki
Bronze medal – third place	2006 Basel
Bronze medal – third place	2010 Champéry
Bronze medal – third place	2013 Stavanger

Mirjam Ott (born 27 January 1972 in Bern) is a retired Swiss curler from Laax, Switzerland. She is two-time Olympic silver medalist (2002, 2006), 2012 World champion and two-time European champion (1996, 2008). During her career, she represents Switzerland at four Winter Olympics, seven World Championships and eleven European Championships in total.

== Career ==
Ott won the Olympic silver medal twice; in the 2002 Olympic Games in Salt Lake City (with skip Luzia Ebnöther) and 2006 in Turin (as skip herself), making her the first woman with two Olympic medals in curling. In 2008 the team won the European Championship in Sweden. At the 2010 Vancouver Olympic Games, her team finished a disappointing fourth place, as Ott's touch completely deserted her late in the semi-final and bronze medal matches. Ott won the 2012 World Women's Curling Championship after defeating Sweden's Margaretha Sigfridsson in the final. This is the first World Women's Championship title for Switzerland in 29 years.

At the 2014 Sochi Olympic Games, Ott skipped her team to a second consecutive fourth-place finish at the Olympic Winter Games. Switzerland were beaten 6-5 by Great Britain in the Bronze Medal match. She retired following the 2013–14 season.

After retirement, she coached the team skipped by Alina Pätz to win the 2015 World Women's Curling Championship. She is also the coach of the team skipped by Silvana Tirinzoni at 2025 World Women's Curling Championship and 2026 Winter Olympics. The team won silver medal in both events.

== Teams ==
Season	Skip	Third	Second	Lead
1996–97	Mirjam Ott	Marianne Flotron; Manuela Kormann	Franziska von Känel	Caroline Balz
2001–02	Luzia Ebnöther	Mirjam Ott	Tanya Frei	Nadia Röthlisberger; Laurence Bidaud
2004–05	Mirjam Ott	Binia Beeli	Brigitte Schori	Michèle Knobel
2005–06	Mirjam Ott	Binia Beeli	Valeria Spälty	Michèle Moser
2006–07	Mirjam Ott	Binia Feltscher-Beeli	Valeria Spälty	Janine Greiner
2007–08	Mirjam Ott	Carmen Schäfer	Valeria Spälty	Janine Greiner
2008–09	Mirjam Ott	Carmen Schäfer	Valeria Spälty	Janine Greiner
2009–10	Mirjam Ott	Carmen Schäfer	Carmen Küng	Janine Greiner
2010–11	Mirjam Ott	Carmen Schäfer	Carmen Küng	Janine Greiner
2011–12	Mirjam Ott	Carmen Schäfer	Carmen Küng	Janine Greiner
2012–13	Mirjam Ott	Carmen Schäfer	Carmen Küng	Janine Greiner
2013–14	Mirjam Ott	Carmen Schäfer	Carmen Küng	Janine Greiner

== Grand Slam record ==
Key
C	Champion
F	Lost in Final
SF	Lost in Semifinal
QF	Lost in Quarterfinals
R16	Lost in the round of 16
Q	Did not advance to playoffs
T2	Played in Tier 2 event
DNP	Did not participate in event
N/A	Not a Grand Slam event that season

Event	2005–06	2006–07	2007–08	2008–09	2009–10	2010–11	2011–12	2012–13	2013–14
Autumn Gold	N/A	DNP	SF	DNP	Q	DNP	DNP	DNP	DNP
Manitoba Liquor & Lotteries	N/A	DNP	DNP	DNP	Q	DNP	DNP	DNP	Q
Masters	N/A	N/A	N/A	N/A	N/A	N/A	N/A	Q	SF
Colonial Square	N/A	N/A	N/A	N/A	N/A	N/A	N/A	Q	DNP
Players'	Q	DNP	DNP	DNP	DNP	Q	DNP	Q	DNP
