= Red Deer Curling Club =

The Red Deer Curling Club is a curling club in Red Deer, Alberta.

The club was founded ca. 1900s. The club has been operating out of its current location, the Pidherney Curling Centre (formerly the Red Deer Curling Centre) since 1953. Plans are underway to move to a larger, 12-sheet building.

The club is located on 43rd Street in the central part of the city.

The club hosts the annual Red Deer Curling Classic on the World Curling Tour every November.

The club has sent one team to the Brier, in 1931 when Robert Welliver, Joseph LaFrance, Jack Fulton and George Lindsay represented Alberta. They finished 4-5 (5th place). In 2011, the club won the men's side of the 2011 The Dominion Curling Club Championship.
