= 1996 European Curling Championships =

- Host city: Copenhagen, Denmark
- Arena: Hvidovre Ice Rink
- Dates: November 30–December 7
- Men's winner: Scotland
- Curling club: Castle Kennedy CC, Stranraer
- Skip: Hammy McMillan
- Third: Norman Brown
- Second: Mike Hay
- Lead: Brian Binnie
- Alternate: Peter Loudon
- Coach: Hew Chalmers
- Finalist: Sweden
- Women's winner: Switzerland
- Curling club: Bern CC, Bern
- Skip: Mirjam Ott
- Third: Marianne Flotron
- Second: Franziska von Känel
- Lead: Caroline Balz
- Alternate: Margaretha Lindahl
- Coach: Annina von Planta
- Finalist: Sweden

The 1996 European Curling Championships were held from November 30 to December 7 at the Hvidovre Ice Rink in Copenhagen, Denmark.

== Men's ==
=== A Tournament ===
==== Group A ====
Team	Skip	W	L
Scotland	Hammy McMillan	5	0
Germany	Daniel Herberg	3	2
Finland	Markku Uusipaavalniemi	3	2
Denmark	Ulrik Schmidt	2	3
Italy	Claudio Pescia	1	4
France	Jan Henri Ducroz	1	4

==== Group B ====
Team	Skip	W	L
Sweden	Lars-Åke Nordström	5	0
Switzerland	Felix Luchsinger	3	2
England	Martyn Deakin	3	2
Norway	Tormod Andreassen	2	3
Austria	Alois Kreidl	2	3
Bulgaria	Bojidar Momerin	0	5

=== B Tournament ===
==== Group A ====
Team	Skip	W	L
Netherlands	Floris van Imhoff	4	1
Luxembourg	Hanjörg Bless	4	1
Wales	John Hunt	4	1
Czech Republic	Radek Klima	2	3
Russia	Alehander Kolesnikov	1	4
Hungary	Barna Kereszi	0	5

=== Playoffs ===
Quarterfinal
A1	Scotland	10
B4	Norway	7
B2	Switzerland	5
A3	Finland	4
B1	Sweden	9
A4	Denmark	1
A2	Germany	7
B3	England	1

Semi-final
A1	Scotland	8
B2	Switzerland	7
B1	Sweden	7
A2	Germany	3

Final
A1	Scotland	10
B1	Sweden	3

Bronze medal
B2	Switzerland	8
A2	Germany	7

== Women's ==
=== Group A ===
Team	Skip	W	L
Germany	Andrea Schöpp	5	0
Norway	Dordi Nordby	4	1
Denmark	Dorthe Holm	2	3
Italy	Giulia Lacedelli	2	3
Austria	Edeltraud Koudelka	1	4
England	Janice Manson	1	4

=== Group B ===
Team	Skip	W	L
Scotland	Rhona Martin	5	0
Switzerland	Mirjam Ott	4	1
Sweden	Elisabet Gustafson	3	2
Finland	Jaana Jokela	2	3
Czech Republic	Eva Petráková	1	4
Russia	Tatiana Smirnova	0	5

=== B Tournament ===
==== Group A ====
Team	Skip	W	L
France	Nadia Bénier	6	0
Luxembourg	Karen Wauters	4	2
Bulgaria	Roumiana Alanassova	2	4
Netherlands	Beatrice Miltenburg	0	6

=== Playoffs ===
Quarterfinal
A1	Germany	11
B4	Finland	2
B2	Switzerland	6
A3	Denmark	3
B3	Sweden	9
A2	Norway	3
B1	Scotland	6
B-A1	France	4

Semi-final
A1	Germany	3
B2	Switzerland	8
B3	Sweden	8
B1	Scotland	4

Final
B2	Switzerland	7
B3	Sweden	4

Bronze medal
A1	Germany	6
B1	Scotland	4
