= Rob Armitage =

Canadian curler (1957–2022)

- Curler
- Born: September 27, 1957
- Died: November 28, 2022 (aged 65)
Medal record
Men's curling
Representing Canada
World Senior Curling Championships
Gold medal – first place	2013 Fredericton

Robert Benjamin Armitage (né Herlein; September 27, 1957 – November 28, 2022) was a Canadian curler.

== Early life ==
Armitage was born in 1957, the son of Magdalena (Maggie) and Aloysius (Lloyd) Herlein. The family lived in Red Deer, Alberta when his father was killed in a car accident in 1961, and the family temporarily moved to Fusilier, Saskatchewan before moving back to Red Deer a few months later. His mother remarried in 1965 to her new husband Glen Armitage. His mother was killed at a train crossing in 1969, and Glen adopted Rob and his siblings in 1970, which resulted in Rob's surname changing to Armitage. Glen remarried later that year.

Armitage played many sports in his youth, including badminton, Canadian football, rugby, broomball, slow pitch baseball, and fastball in addition to curling. He continued to play baseball as an adult.

== Career ==
Armitage qualified for 12 provincial men's championships in his career, but never won the event. His first trip was in 1979 playing for Roger Hovland, and his final provincial was in 2010. He underwent knee surgery in 2005 which resulted in him "winding down" his competitive men's career.

Armitage and his rink of Randy Ponich, Wilf Edgar and Keith Glover were Alberta Senior champions in 2012, and represented the province at the 2012 Canadian Senior Curling Championships. They went 10-1 after round robin play, finishing first over all. The rink beat Newfoundland and Labrador's Glenn Goss team in the final. They then went undefeated in winning the 2013 World Senior Curling Championships.

Before winning the Alberta seniors in 2012, Armitage had never won a provincial championship of any kind, having never gotten by the likes of "Ed Lukowich, Pat Ryan, Kevin Martin, Randy Ferbey, (or) Kevin Koe in provincial men's play.

Armitage last curled on the World Curling Tour in 2015-16. Armitage began curling on the Tour in 1999, starting out as a third for Lowell Peterman. Armitage skipped his own team from 2001, except for 4 events during the 2005-06 season where he played third for Chris Schille.

In 2018, Armitage won the Canadian Masters Curling Championships playing third for Mickey Pendergast.

In addition to his success at the Seniors and Masters levels, Armitage won a Canadian Cattlemen's curling championship in 1997.

== Personal life ==
Armitage married Heather Blair in 1993. He worked in Red Deer as a Heavy Equipment Operator, and later became a landlord. When he was younger he also worked as a paver, in the oilfield, and as a feed-lot operator. Armitage died from pancreatic cancer on November 28, 2022, at the age of 65.
