= Manuela Kormann =

Swiss curler (born 1976)

Medal record

Curling

Olympic Games
Silver medal – second place	2006 Turin	

European Championships
Silver medal – second place	2005 Garmisch-Partenkirchen	
Bronze medal – third place	2006 Basel	

European Mixed Championship
Gold medal – first place	2011 Tårnby	

Manuela Kormann (born 7 December 1976 in Bern; also known as Manuela Netzer-Kormann) is a Swiss curler. She is a national coach with the Swiss Curling Association. She won a silver medal at 2006 Winter Olympics as the alternate of the team skipped by Mirjam Ott.

Kormann started playing curling in 1986. During her career, she plays in third position or as a skip and is right-handed.
