= 2025 European Curling Championships =

Competition in Finland and Sweden

2025 Le Gruyère AOP European Curling Championships
- Host city: Lohja, Finland (A divisions); Lahti, Finland (B divisions); Östersund, Sweden (C divisions)
- Arena: Kisakallio Sports Institute (A divisions); Pajulahti Sports Centre (B divisions); Östersund Curling Club (C divisions)
- Dates: November 22–29 (A & B divisions); April 26 – May 1 (C division)
- Men's winner: Sweden
- Curling club: Karlstads CK, Karlstad
- Skip: Niklas Edin
- Third: Oskar Eriksson
- Second: Rasmus Wranå
- Lead: Christoffer Sundgren
- Alternate: Simon Olofsson
- Coach: Alexander Lindström
- Finalist: Switzerland (Schwaller)
- Women's winner: Sweden
- Curling club: Sundbybergs CK, Sundbyberg
- Skip: Anna Hasselborg
- Third: Sara McManus
- Second: Agnes Knochenhauer
- Lead: Sofia Scharback
- Alternate: Johanna Heldin
- Coach: Kristian Lindström
- Finalist: Scotland (Jackson)

The 2025 Le Gruyère AOP European Curling Championships were held from November 22 to 29 in Finland, with the A division being held at the Kisakallio Sports Institute in Lohja, and the B division being held at the Pajulahti Sports Centre in Nastola, Lahti. The C division competition was held earlier in the year from April 26 to May 1 at the Östersund Curling Club in Östersund, Sweden. The Swedish teams won gold in both the men's and the women's tournaments.

The tournaments also served as European qualifiers for the 2026 World Curling Championships. The top eight men's teams qualified for the 2026 World Men's Curling Championship and the top seven women's teams qualified for the 2026 World Women's Curling Championship.

The reigning champions of the 2024 women's edition, Silvana Tirinzoni's Swiss team, were not able to defend their back-to-back title after finishing third at the 2024 Swiss Women's Curling Championships, which also served as the sole Swiss qualifying tournament for the European Championships.

This marked the last edition of the B and C Divisions of the European Curling Championships, with World Curling announcing that it will be replaced through the implementation of the new World Curling Championship B and C Divisions, starting in the 2026–27 curling season. The European Curling Championships will continue with a championship featuring the top ten European Member Associations from the previous season’s World Championships.

== Medallists ==
A Division	Gold	Silver	Bronze
Men	Sweden; Niklas Edin; Oskar Eriksson; Rasmus Wranå; Christoffer Sundgren; Simon Olofsson	Switzerland; Benoît Schwarz-van Berkel (Fourth); Yannick Schwaller (Skip); Sven Michel; Pablo Lachat-Couchepin; Kim Schwaller	Scotland; Bruce Mouat; Grant Hardie; Bobby Lammie; Hammy McMillan Jr. Kyle Waddell
Women	Sweden; Anna Hasselborg; Sara McManus; Agnes Knochenhauer; Sofia Scharback; Johanna Heldin	Scotland; Rebecca Morrison (Fourth); Jennifer Dodds; Sophie Sinclair; Sophie Jackson (Skip); Fay Henderson	Switzerland; Corrie Hürlimann; Marina Lörtscher; Stefanie Berset; Celine Schwizgebel; Melina Bezzola

B Division	Gold	Silver	Bronze
Men	Belgium; Jeroen Spruyt (Fourth); Timothy Verreycken (Skip); Tuur Vermeiren; Tom Goethals; Christophe Devis	Spain; Sergio Vez; Nicholas Shaw; Eduardo de Paz; Luis Gómez	Turkey; Uğurcan Karagöz; Muhammet Demirel; Mehmet Bayramoglu; Serkan Karagöz; Selahattin Eșer
Women	Latvia; Evelīna Barone; Rēzija Ieviņa; Katrina Gaidule; Daina Barone; Betija Gulbe	Estonia; Liisa Turmann (Fourth); Kerli Laidsalu (Skip); Erika Tuvike; Heili Grossmann	England; Lisa Farnell; Anna Fowler; Angharad Ward; Naomi Robinson

C Division	Gold	Silver	Bronze
Men	Latvia; Ritvars Gulbis; Janis Klive; Aivars Avotins; Sandris Buholcs	Slovenia; Tomas Tišler; Jure Čulić; Frédéric Rouge; Gašper Uršič; Jakob Omerzel	Liechtenstein; Lukas Matt; Peter Prasch; Mauro Liesch; Harald Sprenger; Christian Sprenger
Women	Slovakia; Gabriela Kajanová; Silvia Sýkorová; Daniela Matulová; Linda Haferová; Greta Kapolková	Israel; Elana Sone; Andrea Stark; Helen Pokras; Ada Neznamov; Elena Solodkaya	Spain; Leyre Viela; Elena Viela; Nerea Viela; Izaro de Ocariz; Olga Khromchenkova

== Men ==
=== A division ===
==== Qualification ====
The following nations qualified to participate in the 2025 European Curling Championship:

Event	Vacancies	Qualified
2024 European Curling Championships A Division	8	Germany; Scotland; Norway; Switzerland; Sweden; Italy; Austria; Czech Republic
2024 European Curling Championships B Division	2	Denmark; Poland
TOTAL	10	

==== Teams ====
The teams are listed as follows:

Austria	Czech Republic	Denmark	Germany	Italy
Skip: Mathias Genner; Third: Jonas Backofen; Second: Matthäus Hofer; Lead: Johann Karg; Alternate: Martin Reichel	Skip: Lukáš Klíma; Third: Marek Černovský; Second: Martin Jurík; Lead: Lukáš Klípa; Alternate: Radek Boháč	Fourth: Jonathan Vilandt; Skip: Jacob Schmidt; Second: Mads Nørgaard; Lead: Alexander Qvist; Alternate: Kasper Jurlander Bøge	Skip: Marc Muskatewitz; Third: Benjamin Kapp; Second: Felix Messenzehl; Lead: Johannes Scheuerl; Alternate: Mario Trevisiol	Skip: Joël Retornaz; Third: Amos Mosaner; Second: Sebastiano Arman; Lead: Mattia Giovanella; Alternate: Alberto Pimpini
Norway	Poland	Scotland	Sweden	Switzerland
Skip: Magnus Ramsfjell; Third: Martin Sesaker; Second: Bendik Ramsfjell; Lead: Gaute Nepstad; Alternate: Wilhelm Næss	Skip: Konrad Stych; Third: Krzysztof Domin; Second: Marcin Ciemiński; Lead: Bartosz Łobaza; Alternate: Maksym Grzelka	Skip: Bruce Mouat; Third: Grant Hardie; Second: Bobby Lammie; Lead: Hammy McMillan Jr. Alternate: Kyle Waddell	Skip: Niklas Edin; Third: Oskar Eriksson; Second: Rasmus Wranå; Lead: Christoffer Sundgren; Alternate: Simon Olofsson	Fourth: Benoît Schwarz-van Berkel; Skip: Yannick Schwaller; Second: Sven Michel; Lead: Pablo Lachat-Couchepin; Alternate: Kim Schwaller

==== Round robin standings ====
Final Round Robin Standings

Key
Teams to Playoffs and Qualified for the 2026 World Men's Curling Championship
Teams Qualified for the 2026 World Men's Curling Championship

Country	Skip	W	L	W–L	PF	PA	EW	EL	BE	SE	S%	DSC
Scotland	Bruce Mouat	9	0	–	75	39	46	26	4	15	87.8%	16.756
Switzerland	Yannick Schwaller	7	2	–	73	49	38	33	4	9	89.5%	19.450
Italy	Joël Retornaz	6	3	2–0	71	53	41	36	6	10	86.0%	22.169
Sweden	Niklas Edin	6	3	1–1	58	48	40	30	3	15	88.0%	22.463
Germany	Marc Muskatewitz	6	3	0–2	65	46	36	33	8	10	86.2%	28.688
Czech Republic	Lukáš Klíma	4	5	–	60	64	32	32	4	5	83.7%	29.419
Poland	Konrad Stych	3	6	–	50	64	32	37	4	7	77.9%	41.756
Norway	Magnus Ramsfjell	2	7	1–0	49	63	32	45	0	6	80.0%	39.325
Denmark	Jacob Schmidt	2	7	0–1	39	70	31	39	7	5	76.0%	34.819
Austria	Mathias Genner	0	9	–	35	77	24	39	6	2	76.1%	47.550

Round Robin Summary Table
Pos.	Country	Austria	Czech Republic	Denmark	Germany	Italy	Norway	Poland	Scotland	Sweden	Switzerland	Record
10	Austria	—	7–8	4–6	2–8	1–10	7–9	3–12	4–7	5–7	2–10	0–9
6	Czech Republic	8–7	—	6–7	6–9	9–8	6–4	9–2	5–10	2–7	9–10	4–5
9	Denmark	6–4	7–6	—	2–10	5–7	3–8	5–7	4–9	4–10	3–9	2–7
5	Germany	8–2	9–6	10–2	—	7–9	7–3	6–5	7–8	3–5	8–6	6–3
3	Italy	10–1	8–9	7–5	9–7	—	9–4	9–6	5–8	6–4	8–9	6–3
8	Norway	9–7	4–6	8–3	3–7	4–9	—	8–9	4–7	5–9	5–8	2–7
7	Poland	12–3	2–9	7–5	5–6	6–9	9–8	—	2–7	4–8	3–9	3–6
1	Scotland	7–4	10–5	9–4	8–7	8–5	7–4	7–2	—	11–4	8–4	9–0
4	Sweden	7–5	7–2	10–4	5–3	4–6	9–5	8–4	4–11	—	4–8	6–3
2	Switzerland	10–2	10–9	9–3	6–8	9–8	8–4	9–3	4–8	8–4	—	7–2

==== Round robin results ====
All draw times are listed in Eastern European Summer Time (UTC+03:00).

===== Draw 1 =====
Saturday, November 22, 2:30 pm

Sheet A	1	2	3	4	5	6	7	8	9	10	Final
Norway (Ramsfjell) 🔨	0	0	1	1	0	0	0	2	0	X	4
Italy (Retornaz)	2	1	0	0	2	1	1	0	2	X	9

Sheet B	1	2	3	4	5	6	7	8	9	10	Final
Germany (Muskatewitz)	0	1	0	2	0	2	0	0	2	0	7
Scotland (Mouat) 🔨	2	0	1	0	1	0	1	1	0	2	8

Sheet C	1	2	3	4	5	6	7	8	9	10	Final
Switzerland (Schwaller)	0	0	0	3	0	2	1	0	2	X	8
Sweden (Edin) 🔨	1	0	1	0	1	0	0	1	0	X	4

Sheet D	1	2	3	4	5	6	7	8	9	10	Final
Czech Republic (Klíma) 🔨	2	0	0	2	0	0	0	3	0	1	8
Austria (Genner)	0	0	2	0	0	0	4	0	1	0	7

Sheet E	1	2	3	4	5	6	7	8	9	10	Final
Poland (Stych)	0	1	1	0	3	0	1	1	0	X	7
Denmark (Schmidt) 🔨	0	0	0	2	0	2	0	0	1	X	5

===== Draw 2 =====
Sunday, November 23, 9:00 am

Sheet A	1	2	3	4	5	6	7	8	9	10	Final
Scotland (Mouat) 🔨	1	1	0	3	0	0	1	0	0	4	10
Czech Republic (Klíma)	0	0	1	0	0	2	0	1	1	0	5

Sheet B	1	2	3	4	5	6	7	8	9	10	Final
Italy (Retornaz) 🔨	3	2	1	3	0	1	X	X	X	X	10
Austria (Genner)	0	0	0	0	1	0	X	X	X	X	1

Sheet C	1	2	3	4	5	6	7	8	9	10	Final
Poland (Stych) 🔨	0	2	0	1	0	3	0	2	0	1	9
Norway (Ramsfjell)	1	0	2	0	2	0	2	0	1	0	8

Sheet D	1	2	3	4	5	6	7	8	9	10	Final
Denmark (Schmidt) 🔨	0	1	0	0	2	0	1	0	X	X	4
Sweden (Edin)	3	0	2	0	0	3	0	2	X	X	10

Sheet E	1	2	3	4	5	6	7	8	9	10	Final
Germany (Muskatewitz)	2	0	2	1	0	0	1	1	1	0	8
Switzerland (Schwaller) 🔨	0	1	0	0	4	0	0	0	0	1	6

===== Draw 3 =====
Sunday, November 23, 7:00 pm

Sheet A	1	2	3	4	5	6	7	8	9	10	Final
Sweden (Edin) 🔨	0	2	1	0	0	1	0	0	1	0	5
Germany (Muskatewitz)	1	0	0	0	0	0	0	1	0	1	3

Sheet B	1	2	3	4	5	6	7	8	9	10	Final
Norway (Ramsfjell)	0	2	1	0	3	0	2	X	X	X	8
Denmark (Schmidt) 🔨	1	0	0	1	0	1	0	X	X	X	3

Sheet C	1	2	3	4	5	6	7	8	9	10	11	Final
Italy (Retornaz) 🔨	0	2	0	2	0	1	0	0	0	3	0	8
Czech Republic (Klíma)	0	0	2	0	3	0	1	1	1	0	1	9

Sheet D	1	2	3	4	5	6	7	8	9	10	Final
Switzerland (Schwaller) 🔨	0	2	2	0	2	0	2	1	X	X	9
Poland (Stych)	1	0	0	1	0	1	0	0	X	X	3

Sheet E	1	2	3	4	5	6	7	8	9	10	Final
Scotland (Mouat) 🔨	0	2	1	1	0	2	0	1	0	X	7
Austria (Genner)	0	0	0	0	2	0	1	0	1	X	4

===== Draw 4 =====
Monday, November 24, 12:00 pm

Sheet A	1	2	3	4	5	6	7	8	9	10	Final
Austria (Genner)	0	1	0	0	0	2	0	X	X	X	3
Poland (Stych) 🔨	1	0	0	4	3	0	4	X	X	X	12

Sheet B	1	2	3	4	5	6	7	8	9	10	11	Final
Switzerland (Schwaller) 🔨	0	2	0	2	2	0	2	0	1	0	1	10
Czech Republic (Klíma)	0	0	3	0	0	1	0	2	0	3	0	9

Sheet C	1	2	3	4	5	6	7	8	9	10	Final
Denmark (Schmidt)	0	0	0	0	3	0	1	0	X	X	4
Scotland (Mouat) 🔨	1	2	0	2	0	2	0	2	X	X	9

Sheet D	1	2	3	4	5	6	7	8	9	10	Final
Sweden (Edin) 🔨	1	1	1	1	0	1	1	0	2	1	9
Norway (Ramsfjell)	0	0	0	0	3	0	0	2	0	0	5

Sheet E	1	2	3	4	5	6	7	8	9	10	Final
Italy (Retornaz) 🔨	1	0	0	2	0	2	0	2	0	2	9
Germany (Muskatewitz)	0	1	0	0	2	0	3	0	1	0	7

===== Draw 5 =====
Monday, November 24, 8:00 pm

Sheet A	1	2	3	4	5	6	7	8	9	10	Final
Switzerland (Schwaller)	1	0	0	1	0	2	0	0	0	X	4
Scotland (Mouat) 🔨	0	0	3	0	2	0	2	0	1	X	8

Sheet B	1	2	3	4	5	6	7	8	9	10	Final
Poland (Stych) 🔨	2	0	1	0	1	1	0	0	1	X	6
Italy (Retornaz)	0	3	0	2	0	0	2	2	0	X	9

Sheet C	1	2	3	4	5	6	7	8	9	10	Final
Norway (Ramsfjell)	0	1	0	2	0	3	1	0	0	2	9
Austria (Genner) 🔨	2	0	1	0	2	0	0	1	1	0	7

Sheet D	1	2	3	4	5	6	7	8	9	10	Final
Germany (Muskatewitz)	0	3	1	0	1	0	5	X	X	X	10
Denmark (Schmidt) 🔨	1	0	0	0	0	1	0	X	X	X	2

Sheet E	1	2	3	4	5	6	7	8	9	10	Final
Czech Republic (Klíma)	0	0	0	1	0	0	1	0	X	X	2
Sweden (Edin) 🔨	1	1	0	0	0	3	0	2	X	X	7

===== Draw 6 =====
Tuesday, November 25, 2:00 pm

Sheet A	1	2	3	4	5	6	7	8	9	10	Final
Poland (Stych) 🔨	2	0	1	0	0	0	0	1	0	X	4
Sweden (Edin)	0	2	0	1	1	1	1	0	2	X	8

Sheet B	1	2	3	4	5	6	7	8	9	10	Final
Scotland (Mouat) 🔨	1	0	2	0	2	0	0	1	1	X	7
Norway (Ramsfjell)	0	2	0	1	0	1	0	0	0	X	4

Sheet C	1	2	3	4	5	6	7	8	9	10	Final
Czech Republic (Klíma)	0	0	1	1	0	2	0	2	0	X	6
Germany (Muskatewitz) 🔨	0	1	0	0	3	0	3	0	2	X	9

Sheet D	1	2	3	4	5	6	7	8	9	10	Final
Austria (Genner)	0	1	0	0	1	0	X	X	X	X	2
Switzerland (Schwaller) 🔨	3	0	1	2	0	4	X	X	X	X	10

Sheet E	1	2	3	4	5	6	7	8	9	10	Final
Denmark (Schmidt)	0	0	1	0	2	0	0	1	1	0	5
Italy (Retornaz) 🔨	1	1	0	2	0	2	0	0	0	1	7

===== Draw 7 =====
Wednesday, November 26, 9:00 am

Sheet A	1	2	3	4	5	6	7	8	9	10	Final
Germany (Muskatewitz)	0	0	2	2	0	4	X	X	X	X	8
Austria (Genner) 🔨	0	1	0	0	1	0	X	X	X	X	2

Sheet B	1	2	3	4	5	6	7	8	9	10	Final
Denmark (Schmidt)	1	0	0	0	1	0	0	1	0	X	3
Switzerland (Schwaller) 🔨	0	2	2	0	0	1	1	0	3	X	9

Sheet C	1	2	3	4	5	6	7	8	9	10	Final
Sweden (Edin) 🔨	0	1	0	1	0	0	1	1	0	0	4
Italy (Retornaz)	0	0	1	0	0	2	0	0	1	2	6

Sheet D	1	2	3	4	5	6	7	8	9	10	Final
Poland (Stych)	0	0	2	0	0	0	0	0	X	X	2
Scotland (Mouat) 🔨	2	1	0	0	2	0	1	1	X	X	7

Sheet E	1	2	3	4	5	6	7	8	9	10	Final
Norway (Ramsfjell)	0	0	0	1	1	1	0	1	0	X	4
Czech Republic (Klíma) 🔨	0	1	2	0	0	0	2	0	1	X	6

===== Draw 8 =====
Wednesday, November 26, 7:00 pm

Sheet A	1	2	3	4	5	6	7	8	9	10	Final
Italy (Retornaz) 🔨	0	2	0	0	1	0	3	0	2	0	8
Switzerland (Schwaller)	0	0	2	0	0	2	0	2	0	3	9

Sheet B	1	2	3	4	5	6	7	8	9	10	Final
Czech Republic (Klíma) 🔨	2	0	3	0	0	3	1	X	X	X	9
Poland (Stych)	0	1	0	0	1	0	0	X	X	X	2

Sheet C	1	2	3	4	5	6	7	8	9	10	Final
Austria (Genner)	0	2	0	0	1	0	1	0	0	0	4
Denmark (Schmidt) 🔨	0	0	1	0	0	1	0	1	1	2	6

Sheet D	1	2	3	4	5	6	7	8	9	10	Final
Norway (Ramsfjell) 🔨	0	1	0	1	0	1	0	0	0	X	3
Germany (Muskatewitz)	1	0	1	0	3	0	0	1	1	X	7

Sheet E	1	2	3	4	5	6	7	8	9	10	Final
Sweden (Edin)	0	1	0	3	0	0	0	0	X	X	4
Scotland (Mouat) 🔨	2	0	2	0	1	1	1	4	X	X	11

===== Draw 9 =====
Thursday, November 27, 2:00 pm

Sheet A	1	2	3	4	5	6	7	8	9	10	11	Final
Czech Republic (Klíma) 🔨	0	1	0	0	0	2	0	2	0	1	0	6
Denmark (Schmidt)	0	0	1	1	2	0	1	0	1	0	1	7

Sheet B	1	2	3	4	5	6	7	8	9	10	Final
Austria (Genner)	0	0	1	0	2	0	0	0	2	X	5
Sweden (Edin) 🔨	0	2	0	3	0	1	0	1	0	X	7

Sheet C	1	2	3	4	5	6	7	8	9	10	Final
Germany (Muskatewitz) 🔨	2	0	2	0	0	0	2	0	0	0	6
Poland (Stych)	0	2	0	1	0	0	0	0	1	1	5

Sheet D	1	2	3	4	5	6	7	8	9	10	Final
Scotland (Mouat)	0	0	3	0	1	1	0	1	0	2	8
Italy (Retornaz) 🔨	0	1	0	1	0	0	2	0	1	0	5

Sheet E	1	2	3	4	5	6	7	8	9	10	Final
Switzerland (Schwaller) 🔨	2	0	2	1	0	0	3	0	X	X	8
Norway (Ramsfjell)	0	2	0	0	1	0	0	1	X	X	4

==== Playoffs ====
Semifinals
1	Scotland	5
4	Sweden	8
2	Switzerland	8
3	Italy	7

Gold medal game
4	Sweden	5
2	Switzerland	4
Bronze medal game
1	Scotland	9
3	Italy	3

===== Semifinals =====
Friday, November 28, 9:00 am

Sheet A	1	2	3	4	5	6	7	8	9	10	Final
Switzerland (Schwaller) 🔨	0	2	0	0	2	0	1	1	0	2	8
Italy (Retornaz)	1	0	2	0	0	2	0	0	2	0	7

Player percentages
Switzerland		Italy	
Pablo Lachat-Couchepin	93%	Mattia Giovanella	98%
Sven Michel	89%	Sebastiano Arman	93%
Yannick Schwaller	95%	Amos Mosaner	93%
Benoît Schwarz-van Berkel	76%	Joël Retornaz	79%
Total	88%	Total	91%

Sheet D	1	2	3	4	5	6	7	8	9	10	Final
Scotland (Mouat) 🔨	1	0	0	1	0	2	0	1	0	0	5
Sweden (Edin)	0	1	1	0	1	0	2	0	2	1	8

Player percentages
Scotland		Sweden	
Hammy McMillan Jr.	96%	Christoffer Sundgren	94%
Bobby Lammie	83%	Rasmus Wranå	85%
Grant Hardie	90%	Oskar Eriksson	85%
Bruce Mouat	75%	Niklas Edin	93%
Total	86%	Total	89%

===== Bronze medal game =====
Friday, November 28, 7:00 pm

Sheet C	1	2	3	4	5	6	7	8	9	10	Final
Scotland (Mouat) 🔨	0	2	0	1	0	3	0	3	X	X	9
Italy (Retornaz)	1	0	0	0	1	0	1	0	X	X	3

Player percentages
Scotland		Italy	
Hammy McMillan Jr.	97%	Mattia Giovanella	91%
Bobby Lammie	88%	Sebastiano Arman	80%
Grant Hardie	100%	Amos Mosaner	77%
Bruce Mouat	91%	Joël Retornaz	77%
Total	94%	Total	81%

===== Gold medal game =====
Saturday, November 29, 3:00 pm

Team	1	2	3	4	5	6	7	8	9	10	11	Final
Sweden (Edin)	1	0	0	0	1	0	1	0	1	0	1	5
Switzerland (Schwaller) 🔨	0	0	0	0	0	1	0	1	0	2	0	4

Player percentages
Sweden		Switzerland	
Christoffer Sundgren	92%	Pablo Lachat-Couchepin	89%
Rasmus Wranå	88%	Sven Michel	93%
Oskar Eriksson	83%	Yannick Schwaller	85%
Niklas Edin	86%	Benoît Schwarz-van Berkel	80%
Total	87%	Total	87%

==== Player percentages ====
Round robin only

Leads	%
(Sweden) Christoffer Sundgren	93.3
(Italy) Mattia Giovanella	92.8
(Switzerland) Pablo Lachat-Couchepin	91.3
(Germany) Johannes Scheuerl	91.1
(Czech Republic) Lukáš Klípa	89.8

Seconds	%
(Switzerland) Sven Michel	90.8
(Sweden) Rasmus Wranå	89.1
(Scotland) Bobby Lammie	85.7
(Italy) Sebastiano Arman	84.8
(Germany) Felix Messenzehl	82.3

Thirds	%
(Scotland) Grant Hardie	88.5
(Switzerland) Yannick Schwaller (Skip)	88.0
(Sweden) Oskar Eriksson	87.3
(Germany) Benjamin Kapp	87.0
(Czech Republic) Marek Černovský	83.2

Skips	%
(Scotland) Bruce Mouat	89.0
(Switzerland) Benoît Schwarz-van Berkel (Fourth)	87.6
(Italy) Joël Retornaz	84.6
(Germany) Marc Muskatewitz	84.5
(Sweden) Niklas Edin	82.4

==== Final standings ====
Key
Teams Advance to the 2026 World Men's Curling Championship

Place	Team
1st place, gold medalist(s)	Sweden
2nd place, silver medalist(s)	Switzerland
3rd place, bronze medalist(s)	Scotland
4	Italy
5	Germany
6	Czech Republic
7	Poland
8	Norway
9	Denmark
10	Austria

=== B division ===
==== Teams ====
The teams are listed as follows:

Belgium	England	Estonia	Finland
Fourth: Jeroen Spruyt; Skip: Timothy Verreycken; Second: Tuur Vermeiren; Lead: Tom Goethals; Alternate: Christophe Devis	Skip: Rob Retchless; Third: Jotham Sugden; Second: Scott Gibson; Lead: Andrew Woolston; Alternate: Jonathan Havercroft	Skip: Eduard Veltsman; Third: Mihhail Vlassov; Second: Janis Kiziridi; Lead: Igor Dzendzeljuk; Alternate: Konstantin Dotsenko	Skip: Kalle Kiiskinen; Third: Jani Sullanmaa; Second: Iiro Sipola; Lead: Paavo Kuosmanen; Alternate: Teemu Salo
France	Hungary	Ireland	Israel
Fourth: Quentin Morard; Skip: Eddy Mercier; Second: Yannick Valvassori; Lead: Killian Gaudin	Fourth: Balazs Foti; Skip: Gabor Ezsol; Second: Tamas Szabad; Lead: Balazs Varga; Alternate: Gyorgy Deak	Skip: John Wilson; Third: Kyle Paradis; Second: James Russell; Lead: Craig Whyte	Skip: Alex Pokras; Third: Dimitri Abanin; Second: Aaron Horowitz; Lead: Doron Berger
Latvia	Netherlands	Slovakia	Slovenia
Skip: Martins Truksans; Third: Ritvars Gulbis; Second: Janis Klive; Lead: Sandris Buholcs; Alternate: Aivars Avotins	Skip: Simon Spits; Third: Bart Klomp; Second: Floris Ros; Lead: Hessel Janssens; Alternate: Hessel Prins	Skip: Pavol Pitoňák; Third: František Pitoňák; Second: Tomáš Pitoňák; Lead: Peter Pitoňák; Alternate: Marek Pitoňák	Skip: Tomas Tišler; Third: Jure Čulić; Second: Frédéric Rouge; Lead: Jakob Omerzel; Alternate: Simon Langus
Spain	Turkey	Ukraine	Wales
Skip: Sergio Vez; Third: Nicholas Shaw; Second: Eduardo de Paz; Lead: Luis Gómez	Skip: Uğurcan Karagöz; Third: Muhammet Demirel; Second: Mehmet Bayramoglu; Lead: Serkan Karagöz; Alternate: Selahattin Eșer	Skip: Eduard Nikolov; Third: Yaroslav Shchur; Second: Artem Suhak; Lead: Vladyslav Koval	Skip: James Pougher; Third: Rhys Phillips; Second: Gary Coombs; Lead: Simon Pougher; Alternate: Martin Lloyd

==== Round robin standings ====
Final Round Robin Standings

Key
Teams to Playoffs

Group A	Skip	W	L	W–L	DSC
Belgium	Timothy Verreycken	7	0	–	57.350
Spain	Sergio Vez	6	1	–	42.750
Finland	Kalle Kiiskinen	5	2	–	40.025
Ireland	John Wilson	4	3	–	48.017
Hungary	Gabor Ezsol	2	5	1–0	41.517
Netherlands	Simon Spits	2	5	0–1	50.875
Slovakia	Pavol Pitoňák	1	6	1–0	78.067
Israel	Alex Pokras	1	6	0–1	78.592

Group B	Skip	W	L	W–L	DSC
Turkey	Uğurcan Karagöz	6	1	1–0	65.783
England	Rob Retchless	6	1	0–1	69.922
Ukraine	Eduard Nikolov	4	3	1–0	42.867
Latvia	Martins Truksans	4	3	0–1	71.483
Slovenia	Tomas Tišler	2	5	2–1; 1–0	42.950
Wales	James Pougher	2	5	2–1; 0–1	45.792
Estonia	Eduard Veltsman	2	5	1–2; 1–0	32.500
France	Eddy Mercier	2	5	1–2; 0–1	59.542

Group A Round Robin Summary Table
Pos.	Country	Belgium	Finland	Hungary		Israel	Netherlands	Slovakia	Spain	Record
1	Belgium	—	9–5	9–2	11–4	13–2	10–4	12–2	7–3	7–0
3	Finland	5–9	—	9–2	10–4	9–1	11–5	9–5	8–9	5–2
5	Hungary	2–9	2–9	—	6–11	5–10	8–6	11–8	7–8	2–5
4	Ireland	4–11	4–10	11–6	—	9–8	5–4	12–8	6–7	4–3
8	Israel	2–13	1–9	10–5	8–9	—	2–8	6–7	2–12	1–6
6	Netherlands	4–10	5–11	6–8	4–5	8–2	—	6–4	3–7	2–5
7	Slovakia	2–12	5–9	8–11	8–12	7–6	4–6	—	4–10	1–6
2	Spain	3–7	9–8	8–7	7–6	12–2	7–3	10–4	—	6–1

Group B Round Robin Summary Table
Pos.	Country	England	Estonia	France	Latvia	Slovenia	Turkey	Ukraine	Wales	Record
2	England	—	9–7	7–4	10–5	10–2	4–8	6–5	11–2	6–1
7	Estonia	7–9	—	8–6	7–8	6–8	2–7	10–3	5–8	2–5
8	France	4–7	6–8	—	7–9	10–2	5–7	6–2	5–6	2–5
4	Latvia	5–10	8–7	9–7	—	8–7	5–10	6–7	8–4	4–3
5	Slovenia	2–10	8–6	2–10	7–8	—	8–10	4–10	9–5	2–5
1	Turkey	8–4	7–2	7–5	10–5	10–8	—	3–7	9–3	6–1
3	Ukraine	5–6	3–10	2–6	7–6	10–4	7–3	—	10–2	4–3
6	Wales	2–11	8–5	6–5	4–8	5–9	3–9	2–10	—	2–5

==== Playoffs ====
Qualification games
B2	England	8
A3	Finland	10
A2	Spain	6
B3	Ukraine	5

Semifinals
A1	Belgium	9
A3	Finland	7
B1	Turkey	1
A2	Spain	8

Gold medal game
A1	Belgium	8
A2	Spain	5
Bronze medal game
A3	Finland	9
B1	Turkey	10

===== Qualification games =====
Friday, November 28, 6:00 pm

Sheet A	1	2	3	4	5	6	7	8	9	10	Final
England (Retchless) 🔨	2	1	0	1	1	0	2	0	1	0	8
Finland (Kiiskinen)	0	0	3	0	0	2	0	3	0	2	10

Sheet B	1	2	3	4	5	6	7	8	9	10	Final
Spain (Vez) 🔨	0	2	0	0	0	1	0	2	0	1	6
Ukraine (Nikolov)	0	0	2	0	0	0	1	0	2	0	5

===== Semifinals =====
Saturday, November 29, 9:00 am

Team	1	2	3	4	5	6	7	8	9	10	Final
Belgium (Verreycken) 🔨	3	0	0	2	0	0	0	4	0	X	9
Finland (Kiiskinen)	0	1	1	0	1	1	1	0	2	X	7

Team	1	2	3	4	5	6	7	8	9	10	Final
Turkey (Karagöz) 🔨	0	0	1	0	0	0	0	0	X	X	1
Spain (Vez)	0	0	0	1	3	2	1	1	X	X	8

===== Bronze medal game =====
Saturday, November 29, 2:30 pm

Sheet E	1	2	3	4	5	6	7	8	9	10	11	Final
Finland (Kiiskinen)	0	1	0	0	1	0	5	0	1	1	0	9
Turkey (Karagöz) 🔨	2	0	2	2	0	1	0	2	0	0	1	10

===== Gold medal game =====
Saturday, November 29, 2:30 pm

Sheet D	1	2	3	4	5	6	7	8	9	10	Final
Belgium (Verreycken) 🔨	0	0	0	1	0	2	0	2	0	3	8
Spain (Vez)	0	0	1	0	2	0	1	0	1	0	5

==== Final standings ====
Place	Team
1st place, gold medalist(s)	Belgium
2nd place, silver medalist(s)	Spain
3rd place, bronze medalist(s)	Turkey
4	Finland
5	England
5	Ukraine
7	Ireland
8	Latvia
9	Hungary
10	Slovenia
11	Wales
12	Netherlands
13	Estonia
14	Slovakia
15	France
16	Israel

=== C Division ===
==== Teams ====
The teams are listed as follows:

Andorra	Bosnia and Herzegovina	Croatia	Georgia	Latvia
Skip: Josep Garcia; Third: Enric Morral; Second: César Mialdea; Lead: Valentín Ortiz	Skip: Mak Dorić; Third: Vladan Savić; Second: Bojan Malis; Lead: Bojan Macar; Alternate: Sinisa Karisik	Skip: Alberto Skendrović; Third: Bojan Gabrić; Second: Davor Dzepina; Lead: Ivan Kapović; Alternate: Zvonimir Lovrić	Skip: Gocha Jeiranashvili; Third: Davit Minasiani; Second: Kakha Kurtanidze; Lead: Eduard Kalandadze; Alternate: Irakil Khechuashvili	Skip: Ritvars Gulbis; Third: Janis Klive; Second: Aivars Avotins; Lead: Sandris Buholcs
Liechtenstein	Romania	Serbia	Slovenia	
Skip: Lukas Matt; Third: Peter Prasch; Second: Mauro Liesch; Lead: Harald Sprenger; Alternate: Christian Sprenger	Skip: Allen Coliban; Third: Cristian Matau; Second: Bogdan Colceriu; Lead: Tudor Mihalca	Skip: Đorđe Nešković; Third: Filip Stojanović; Second: Goran Ungurović; Lead: Viktor Savicević	Skip: Tomas Tišler; Third: Jure Čulić; Second: Frédéric Rouge; Lead: Gašper Uršič; Alternate: Jakob Omerzel	

==== Round robin standings ====
Final Round Robin Standings

Key
Teams to Playoffs

Country	Skip	W	L	W–L	DSC
Slovenia	Tomas Tisler	7	1	1–0	39.02
Latvia	Ritvars Gulbis	7	1	0–1	44.20
Serbia	Đorđe Nešković	5	3	1–0	159.22
Liechtenstein	Lukas Matt	5	3	0–1	128.19
Andorra	Josep Garcia	4	4	–	137.20
Bosnia and Herzegovina	Mak Dorić	3	5	1–0	160.25
Romania	Allen Coliban	3	5	0–1	73.69
Croatia	Alberto Skendrović	2	6	–	87.19
Georgia	Gocha Jeiranashvili	0	8	–	181.39

Round Robin Summary Table
Pos.	Country	Andorra	Bosnia and Herzegovina	Croatia	Georgia	Latvia	Liechtenstein	Romania	Serbia	Slovenia	Record
5	Andorra	—	7–5	9–4	13–0	4–8	5–6	3–7	9–3	2–10	4–4
6	Bosnia and Herzegovina	5–7	—	6–5	11–4	2–8	7–8	8–4	7–8	2–11	3–5
8	Croatia	4–9	5–6	—	15–2	0–19	3–8	8–2	3–7	2–13	2–6
9	Georgia	0–13	4–11	2–15	—	0–26	6–12	1–13	2–12	1–18	0–8
2	Latvia	8–4	8–2	19–0	26–0	—	13–2	12–2	9–3	6–8	7–1
4	Liechtenstein	6–5	8–7	8–3	12–6	2–13	—	7–6	4–5	5–8	5–3
7	Romania	7–3	4–8	2–8	13–1	2–12	6–7	—	3–5	8–3	3–5
3	Serbia	3–9	8–7	7–3	12–2	3–9	5–4	5–3	—	2–7	5–3
1	Slovenia	10–2	11–2	13–2	18–1	8–6	8–5	3–8	7–2	—	7–1

==== Playoffs ====
Semifinals
1	Slovenia	11
4	Liechtenstein	3
2	Latvia	12
3	Serbia	0

Gold medal game
1	Slovenia	6
2	Latvia	10
Bronze medal game
4	Liechtenstein	7
3	Serbia	4

===== Semifinals =====
Thursday, May 1, 10:00

Sheet C	1	2	3	4	5	6	7	8	Final
Slovenia (Tišler) 🔨	4	0	2	1	4	0	X	X	11
Liechtenstein (Matt)	0	2	0	0	0	1	X	X	3

Sheet E	1	2	3	4	5	6	7	8	Final
Latvia (Gulbis) 🔨	4	3	1	1	1	2	X	X	12
Serbia (Nešković)	0	0	0	0	0	0	X	X	0

===== Bronze medal game =====
Thursday, May 1, 15:00

Sheet B	1	2	3	4	5	6	7	8	Final
Liechtenstein (Matt)	1	0	0	1	1	0	2	2	7
Serbia (Nešković) 🔨	0	1	2	0	0	1	0	0	4

===== Gold medal game =====
Thursday, May 1, 15:00

Sheet D	1	2	3	4	5	6	7	8	Final
Slovenia (Tišler)	1	2	0	2	0	1	0	X	6
Latvia (Gulbis) 🔨	0	0	2	0	4	0	4	X	10

==== Final standings ====
Key
Promoted to 2025 B division

Place	Team
1st place, gold medalist(s)	Latvia
2nd place, silver medalist(s)	Slovenia
3rd place, bronze medalist(s)	Liechtenstein
4	Serbia
5	Andorra
6	Bosnia and Herzegovina
7	Romania
8	Croatia
9	Georgia

== Women ==
=== A division ===
==== Qualification ====
The following nations qualified to participate in the 2025 European Curling Championship:

Event	Vacancies	Qualified
2024 European Curling Championships A Division	8	Switzerland; Sweden; Scotland; Italy; Denmark; Turkey; Norway; Lithuania
2024 European Curling Championships B Division	2	Czech Republic; Germany
TOTAL	10	

==== Teams ====
The teams are listed as follows:

Czech Republic	Denmark	Germany	Italy	Lithuania
Skip: Anna Kubešková; Third: Michaela Baudyšová; Second: Aneta Müllerová; Lead: Klara Pařízková; Alternate: Karolína Špundová	Skip: Madeleine Dupont; Third: Mathilde Halse; Second: Jasmin Holtermann; Lead: Denise Dupont; Alternate: My Larsen	Fourth: Kim Sutor; Third: Emira Abbes; Second: Zoé Antes; Skip: Sara Messenzehl; Alternate: Joy Sutor	Skip: Stefania Constantini; Third: Elena Mathis; Second: Angela Romei; Lead: Giulia Zardini Lacedelli; Alternate: Marta Lo Deserto	Skip: Virginija Paulauskaitė; Third: Olga Dvojeglazova; Second: Miglė Kiudytė; Lead: Rūta Blažienė; Alternate: Justina Zalieckienė
Norway	Scotland	Sweden	Switzerland	Turkey
Fourth: Kristin Skaslien; Skip: Marianne Rørvik; Second: Mille Haslev Nordbye; Lead: Eilin Kjærland; Alternate: Ingeborg Forbregd	Fourth: Rebecca Morrison; Third: Jennifer Dodds; Second: Sophie Sinclair; Skip: Sophie Jackson; Alternate: Fay Henderson	Skip: Anna Hasselborg; Third: Sara McManus; Second: Agnes Knochenhauer; Lead: Sofia Scharback; Alternate: Johanna Heldin	Skip: Corrie Hürlimann; Third: Marina Lörtscher; Second: Stefanie Berset; Lead: Celine Schwizgebel; Alternate: Melina Bezzola	Skip: Dilşat Yıldız; Third: Öznur Polat; Second: İclal Karaman; Lead: Berfin Şengül; Alternate: İfayet Şafak Çalıkuşu

==== Round robin standings ====
Final Round Robin Standings

Key
Teams to Playoffs and Qualified for the 2026 World Women's Curling Championship
Teams Qualified for the 2026 World Women's Curling Championship

Country	Skip	W	L	W–L	PF	PA	EW	EL	BE	SE	S%	DSC
Sweden	Anna Hasselborg	8	1	–	66	43	38	31	7	9	85.0%	23.625
Switzerland	Corrie Hürlimann	6	3	–	64	52	36	38	9	6	81.0%	34.225
Scotland	Sophie Jackson	5	4	2–1; 1–0	47	55	34	36	5	10	79.6%	42.256
Norway	Marianne Rørvik	5	4	2–1; 0–1	57	50	39	32	7	10	79.8%	31.600
Denmark	Madeleine Dupont	5	4	1–2; 1–0	60	53	39	37	2	10	81.7%	47.806
Turkey	Dilşat Yıldız	5	4	1–2; 0–1	63	42	37	27	10	15	81.4%	44.663
Italy	Stefania Constantini	4	5	–	49	55	35	36	8	10	83.7%	39.575
Lithuania	Virginija Paulauskaitė	3	6	1–0	56	66	37	37	2	7	68.2%	57.388
Germany	Sara Messenzehl	3	6	0–1	46	60	33	39	3	4	72.8%	44.381
Czech Republic	Anna Kubešková	1	8	–	46	77	32	41	3	6	72.6%	51.113

Round Robin Summary Table
Pos.	Country	Czech Republic	Denmark	Germany	Italy	Lithuania	Norway	Scotland	Sweden	Switzerland	Turkey	Record
10	Czech Republic	—	4–10	8–11	7–6	3–11	4–7	3–8	6–7	5–7	6–12	1–8
5	Denmark	10–4	—	9–3	5–6	8–4	6–8	4–8	4–9	8–7	6–4	5–4
9	Germany	11–8	3–9	—	3–5	5–8	6–5	5–6	4–8	4–8	5–3	3–6
7	Italy	6–7	6–5	5–3	—	8–7	2–9	9–2	3–7	4–8	6–7	4–5
8	Lithuania	11–3	4–8	8–5	7–8	—	6–9	5–6	3–9	10–5	2–13	3–6
4	Norway	7–4	8–6	5–6	9–2	9–6	—	5–8	4–7	5–6	5–4	5–4
3	Scotland	8–3	8–4	6–5	2–9	6–5	8–5	—	6–7	3–8	0–9	5–4
1	Sweden	7–6	9–4	8–4	7–3	9–3	7–4	7–6	—	5–10	7–3	8–1
2	Switzerland	7–5	7–8	8–4	8–4	5–10	6–5	8–3	10–5	—	5–8	6–3
6	Turkey	12–6	4–6	3–5	7–6	13–2	4–5	9–0	3–7	8–5	—	5–4

==== Round robin results ====
All draw times are listed in Eastern European Summer Time (UTC+03:00).

===== Draw 1 =====
Saturday, November 22, 9:00 am

Sheet A	1	2	3	4	5	6	7	8	9	10	Final
Czech Republic (Kubešková)	0	2	0	1	0	1	0	0	X	X	4
Denmark (Dupont) 🔨	2	0	2	0	1	0	3	2	X	X	10

Sheet B	1	2	3	4	5	6	7	8	9	10	Final
Switzerland (Hürlimann) 🔨	0	2	0	2	0	0	5	0	1	X	10
Sweden (Hasselborg)	0	0	2	0	1	1	0	1	0	X	5

Sheet C	1	2	3	4	5	6	7	8	9	10	Final
Italy (Constantini)	0	3	0	2	1	1	0	1	0	0	8
Lithuania (Paulauskaitė) 🔨	1	0	1	0	0	0	2	0	2	1	7

Sheet D	1	2	3	4	5	6	7	8	9	10	Final
Scotland (Jackson)	0	0	0	0	0	0	X	X	X	X	0
Turkey (Yıldız) 🔨	3	1	1	2	1	1	X	X	X	X	9

Sheet E	1	2	3	4	5	6	7	8	9	10	11	Final
Norway (Rørvik) 🔨	0	0	1	0	1	0	2	0	0	1	0	5
Germany (Messenzehl)	0	0	0	0	0	2	0	3	0	0	1	6

===== Draw 2 =====
Saturday, November 22, 7:30 pm

Sheet A	1	2	3	4	5	6	7	8	9	10	Final
Sweden (Hasselborg) 🔨	0	1	0	1	0	3	0	1	0	1	7
Scotland (Jackson)	0	0	3	0	1	0	1	0	1	0	6

Sheet B	1	2	3	4	5	6	7	8	9	10	Final
Denmark (Dupont)	0	0	0	2	0	2	0	1	1	X	6
Turkey (Yıldız) 🔨	0	0	0	0	2	0	2	0	0	X	4

Sheet C	1	2	3	4	5	6	7	8	9	10	Final
Norway (Rørvik) 🔨	0	2	0	2	0	0	2	1	0	X	7
Czech Republic (Kubešková)	0	0	1	0	1	1	0	0	1	X	4

Sheet D	1	2	3	4	5	6	7	8	9	10	Final
Germany (Messenzehl) 🔨	1	0	1	0	2	0	0	1	0	X	5
Lithuania (Paulauskaitė)	0	2	0	1	0	3	1	0	1	X	8

Sheet E	1	2	3	4	5	6	7	8	9	10	Final
Switzerland (Hürlimann)	0	0	1	1	0	0	2	0	2	2	8
Italy (Constantini) 🔨	0	1	0	0	1	1	0	1	0	0	4

===== Draw 3 =====
Sunday, November 23, 2:00 pm

Sheet A	1	2	3	4	5	6	7	8	9	10	Final
Lithuania (Paulauskaitė)	0	1	0	3	0	0	1	0	2	3	10
Switzerland (Hürlimann) 🔨	1	0	2	0	1	0	0	1	0	0	5

Sheet B	1	2	3	4	5	6	7	8	9	10	Final
Czech Republic (Kubešková)	1	0	1	2	0	3	0	0	0	1	8
Germany (Messenzehl) 🔨	0	2	0	0	3	0	3	2	1	0	11

Sheet C	1	2	3	4	5	6	7	8	9	10	Final
Denmark (Dupont)	0	0	0	1	1	0	0	2	0	0	4
Scotland (Jackson) 🔨	1	2	1	0	0	1	1	0	1	1	8

Sheet D	1	2	3	4	5	6	7	8	9	10	Final
Italy (Constantini)	0	0	0	2	0	0	0	X	X	X	2
Norway (Rørvik) 🔨	2	2	1	0	2	1	1	X	X	X	9

Sheet E	1	2	3	4	5	6	7	8	9	10	Final
Sweden (Hasselborg) 🔨	0	0	1	0	1	2	0	0	0	3	7
Turkey (Yıldız)	0	0	1	0	0	0	1	1	0	0	3

===== Draw 4 =====
Monday, November 24, 8:00 am

Sheet A	1	2	3	4	5	6	7	8	9	10	11	Final
Turkey (Yıldız)	0	0	0	1	0	2	0	0	0	1	0	4
Norway (Rørvik) 🔨	1	0	0	0	2	0	0	1	0	0	1	5

Sheet B	1	2	3	4	5	6	7	8	9	10	Final
Italy (Constantini) 🔨	2	3	0	0	0	1	1	2	X	X	9
Scotland (Jackson)	0	0	0	2	0	0	0	0	X	X	2

Sheet C	1	2	3	4	5	6	7	8	9	10	Final
Germany (Messenzehl)	0	1	0	0	3	0	0	0	0	X	4
Sweden (Hasselborg) 🔨	1	0	1	2	0	0	2	0	2	X	8

Sheet D	1	2	3	4	5	6	7	8	9	10	Final
Lithuania (Paulauskaitė) 🔨	1	0	3	0	2	2	2	1	X	X	11
Czech Republic (Kubešková)	0	1	0	2	0	0	0	0	X	X	3

Sheet E	1	2	3	4	5	6	7	8	9	10	Final
Denmark (Dupont) 🔨	0	2	2	0	1	0	0	0	3	0	8
Switzerland (Hürlimann)	0	0	0	1	0	2	1	2	0	1	7

===== Draw 5 =====
Monday, November 24, 4:00 pm

Sheet A	1	2	3	4	5	6	7	8	9	10	Final
Italy (Constantini) 🔨	1	0	1	0	0	0	1	X	X	X	3
Sweden (Hasselborg)	0	3	0	1	1	2	0	X	X	X	7

Sheet B	1	2	3	4	5	6	7	8	9	10	Final
Norway (Rørvik) 🔨	1	0	2	1	0	1	0	0	3	0	8
Denmark (Dupont)	0	2	0	0	2	0	0	1	0	1	6

Sheet C	1	2	3	4	5	6	7	8	9	10	Final
Czech Republic (Kubešková) 🔨	1	0	0	4	0	0	0	1	0	X	6
Turkey (Yıldız)	0	3	1	0	2	1	1	0	4	X	12

Sheet D	1	2	3	4	5	6	7	8	9	10	Final
Switzerland (Hürlimann) 🔨	2	0	0	1	0	1	0	3	1	X	8
Germany (Messenzehl)	0	1	0	0	2	0	1	0	0	X	4

Sheet E	1	2	3	4	5	6	7	8	9	10	Final
Scotland (Jackson)	0	0	1	2	0	1	0	2	0	X	6
Lithuania (Paulauskaitė) 🔨	1	1	0	0	1	0	1	0	1	X	5

===== Draw 6 =====
Tuesday, November 25, 9:00 am

Sheet A	1	2	3	4	5	6	7	8	9	10	Final
Norway (Rørvik) 🔨	2	0	1	0	0	1	1	0	4	X	9
Lithuania (Paulauskaitė)	0	1	0	2	0	0	0	3	0	X	6

Sheet B	1	2	3	4	5	6	7	8	9	10	Final
Sweden (Hasselborg) 🔨	0	2	0	3	0	1	0	1	0	0	7
Czech Republic (Kubešková)	0	0	2	0	1	0	1	0	1	1	6

Sheet C	1	2	3	4	5	6	7	8	9	10	Final
Scotland (Jackson)	0	1	0	1	0	1	0	X	X	X	3
Switzerland (Hürlimann) 🔨	0	0	1	0	5	0	2	X	X	X	8

Sheet D	1	2	3	4	5	6	7	8	9	10	Final
Turkey (Yıldız)	0	0	0	0	2	0	1	0	3	1	7
Italy (Constantini) 🔨	0	0	0	2	0	3	0	1	0	0	6

Sheet E	1	2	3	4	5	6	7	8	9	10	Final
Germany (Messenzehl) 🔨	1	0	0	0	0	2	0	X	X	X	3
Denmark (Dupont)	0	2	3	2	1	0	1	X	X	X	9

===== Draw 7 =====
Tuesday, November 25, 7:00 pm

Sheet A	1	2	3	4	5	6	7	8	9	10	Final
Switzerland (Hürlimann) 🔨	0	0	0	0	1	1	0	0	3	0	5
Turkey (Yıldız)	0	2	1	2	0	0	1	1	0	1	8

Sheet B	1	2	3	4	5	6	7	8	9	10	Final
Germany (Messenzehl)	0	0	0	1	0	0	1	0	0	1	3
Italy (Constantini) 🔨	1	1	0	0	1	1	0	0	1	0	5

Sheet C	1	2	3	4	5	6	7	8	9	10	Final
Lithuania (Paulauskaitė) 🔨	0	0	0	1	0	1	0	2	0	0	4
Denmark (Dupont)	0	1	1	0	2	0	2	0	1	1	8

Sheet D	1	2	3	4	5	6	7	8	9	10	Final
Norway (Rørvik) 🔨	0	1	0	0	1	0	1	0	1	0	4
Sweden (Hasselborg)	0	0	2	1	0	0	0	2	0	2	7

Sheet E	1	2	3	4	5	6	7	8	9	10	Final
Czech Republic (Kubešková)	0	0	0	0	0	2	0	1	0	X	3
Scotland (Jackson) 🔨	0	0	1	0	2	0	2	0	3	X	8

===== Draw 8 =====
Wednesday, November 26, 2:00 pm

Sheet A	1	2	3	4	5	6	7	8	9	10	Final
Denmark (Dupont) 🔨	1	0	1	0	0	1	1	0	1	0	5
Italy (Constantini)	0	1	0	1	1	0	0	1	0	2	6

Sheet B	1	2	3	4	5	6	7	8	9	10	Final
Scotland (Jackson) 🔨	2	1	1	0	0	1	0	2	0	1	8
Norway (Rørvik)	0	0	0	2	0	0	2	0	1	0	5

Sheet C	1	2	3	4	5	6	7	8	9	10	Final
Turkey (Yıldız) 🔨	0	0	0	0	0	1	0	1	0	1	3
Germany (Messenzehl)	0	0	2	1	0	0	1	0	1	0	5

Sheet D	1	2	3	4	5	6	7	8	9	10	Final
Czech Republic (Kubešková) 🔨	1	0	1	1	0	1	0	1	0	0	5
Switzerland (Hürlimann)	0	2	0	0	0	0	3	0	0	2	7

Sheet E	1	2	3	4	5	6	7	8	9	10	Final
Lithuania (Paulauskaitė) 🔨	0	1	0	1	0	1	X	X	X	X	3
Sweden (Hasselborg)	2	0	5	0	2	0	X	X	X	X	9

===== Draw 9 =====
Thursday, November 27, 9:00 am

Sheet A	1	2	3	4	5	6	7	8	9	10	Final
Scotland (Jackson) 🔨	2	1	0	0	0	1	0	1	0	1	6
Germany (Messenzehl)	0	0	1	0	1	0	2	0	1	0	5

Sheet B	1	2	3	4	5	6	7	8	9	10	Final
Turkey (Yıldız) 🔨	2	2	0	4	0	5	X	X	X	X	13
Lithuania (Paulauskaitė)	0	0	1	0	1	0	X	X	X	X	2

Sheet C	1	2	3	4	5	6	7	8	9	10	11	Final
Switzerland (Hürlimann) 🔨	0	0	0	0	1	0	2	0	2	0	1	6
Norway (Rørvik)	0	0	0	2	0	1	0	1	0	1	0	5

Sheet D	1	2	3	4	5	6	7	8	9	10	Final
Sweden (Hasselborg) 🔨	0	2	0	2	0	1	0	3	1	X	9
Denmark (Dupont)	0	0	1	0	1	0	2	0	0	X	4

Sheet E	1	2	3	4	5	6	7	8	9	10	Final
Italy (Constantini) 🔨	0	1	1	0	0	2	0	0	2	0	6
Czech Republic (Kubešková)	0	0	0	0	2	0	0	2	0	3	7

==== Playoffs ====
Semifinals
1	Sweden	7
4	Norway	6
2	Switzerland	5
3	Scotland	8

Gold medal game
1	Sweden	7
3	Scotland	5
Bronze medal game
4	Norway	4
2	Switzerland	8

===== Semifinals =====
Thursday, November 27, 7:00 pm

Sheet B	1	2	3	4	5	6	7	8	9	10	Final
Switzerland (Hürlimann) 🔨	0	2	0	0	1	0	0	2	0	0	5
Scotland (Jackson)	0	0	2	1	0	2	2	0	0	1	8

Player percentages
Switzerland		Scotland	
Celine Schwizgebel	89%	Sophie Jackson	95%
Stefanie Berset	75%	Sophie Sinclair	91%
Marina Lörtscher	74%	Jennifer Dodds	90%
Corrie Hürlimann	73%	Rebecca Morrison	86%
Total	78%	Total	91%

Sheet D	1	2	3	4	5	6	7	8	9	10	Final
Sweden (Hasselborg) 🔨	1	0	2	0	1	0	0	0	3	0	7
Norway (Rørvik)	0	2	0	0	0	1	0	2	0	1	6

Player percentages
Sweden		Norway	
Sofia Scharback	93%	Eilin Kjærland	74%
Agnes Knochenhauer	91%	Mille Haslev Nordbye	80%
Sara McManus	85%	Marianne Rørvik	80%
Anna Hasselborg	84%	Kristin Skaslien	71%
Total	88%	Total	76%

===== Bronze medal game =====
Friday, November 28, 2:00 pm

Sheet C	1	2	3	4	5	6	7	8	9	10	Final
Norway (Rørvik)	0	0	0	2	0	1	0	0	1	X	4
Switzerland (Hürlimann) 🔨	0	0	3	0	2	0	2	1	0	X	8

Player percentages
Norway		Switzerland	
Eilin Kjærland	88%	Celine Schwizgebel	91%
Mille Haslev Nordbye	75%	Stefanie Berset	82%
Marianne Rørvik	81%	Marina Lörtscher	85%
Kristin Skaslien	76%	Corrie Hürlimann	94%
Total	80%	Total	88%

===== Gold medal game =====
Saturday, November 29, 10:00 am

Sheet C	1	2	3	4	5	6	7	8	9	10	Final
Sweden (Hasselborg) 🔨	0	0	1	0	2	0	2	0	2	0	7
Scotland (Jackson)	0	0	0	1	0	2	0	1	0	1	5

Player percentages
Sweden		Scotland	
Sofia Scharback	78%	Sophie Jackson	91%
Agnes Knochenhauer	86%	Sophie Sinclair	74%
Sara McManus	78%	Jennifer Dodds	76%
Anna Hasselborg	96%	Rebecca Morrison	79%
Total	84%	Total	80%

==== Player percentages ====
Round robin only

Leads	%
(Italy) Giulia Zardini Lacedelli	92.2
(Sweden) Sofia Scharback	87.0
(Denmark) Denise Dupont	85.3
(Turkey) Berfin Şengül	85.2
(Norway) Eilin Kjærland	84.6

Seconds	%
(Sweden) Agnes Knochenhauer	84.4
(Switzerland) Stefanie Berset	81.4
(Denmark) Jasmin Holtermann	80.7
(Italy) Angela Romei	80.5
(Norway) Mille Haslev Nordbye	80.0

Thirds	%
(Switzerland) Marina Lörtscher	84.5
(Sweden) Sara McManus	83.2
(Denmark) Mathilde Halse	82.6
(Italy) Elena Mathis	82.3
(Norway) Marianne Rørvik (Skip)	82.2

Skips	%
(Sweden) Anna Hasselborg	85.1
(Turkey) Dilşat Yıldız	83.0
(Italy) Stefania Constantini	79.8
(Denmark) Madeleine Dupont	78.1
(Switzerland) Corrie Hürlimann	78.1

==== Final standings ====
Key
Teams Advance to the 2026 World Women's Curling Championship

Place	Team
1st place, gold medalist(s)	Sweden
2nd place, silver medalist(s)	Scotland
3rd place, bronze medalist(s)	Switzerland
4	Norway
5	Denmark
6	Turkey
7	Italy
8	Lithuania
9	Germany
10	Czech Republic

=== B division ===
==== Teams ====
The teams are listed as follows:

Austria	England	Estonia	Finland	Hungary
Skip: Verena Pflügler; Third: Hannah Augustin; Second: Astrid Pflügler; Lead: Johanna Höss; Alternate: Jill Witschen	Skip: Lisa Farnell; Third: Anna Fowler; Second: Angharad Ward; Lead: Naomi Robinson	Fourth: Liisa Turmann; Skip: Kerli Laidsalu; Second: Erika Tuvike; Lead: Heili Grossmann	Skip: Tiina Kautonen; Third: Ella Eivola; Second: Susanna Santti; Lead: Mariia Kiiskinen; Alternate: Laura Kitti	Fourth: Linda Joó; Third: Orsolya Toth-Csoesz; Second: Laura Lauchsz; Skip: Vera Kalocsai-van Dorp; Alternate: Hanna Orbán
Latvia	Netherlands	Poland	Slovakia	Slovenia
Skip: Evelīna Barone; Third: Rēzija Ieviņa; Second: Katrina Gaidule; Lead: Daina Barone; Alternate: Betija Gulbe	Fourth: Vanessa Tonoli; Skip: Lisenka Bomas; Second: Anandi Bomas; Lead: Marit van Valkenhoef; Alternate: Linde Nas	Skip: Aneta Lipinska; Third: Ewa Nogly; Second: Marta Leszczyńska; Lead: Magdalena Kolodziej; Alternate: Julia Dyderska	Skip: Gabriela Kajanová; Third: Silvia Sýkorová; Second: Daniela Matulová; Lead: Linda Haferová; Alternate: Greta Kapolková	Fourth: Marusa Gorisek; Third: Nadja Pipan; Skip: Ajda Zavrtanik-Drglin; Lead: Liza Gregori; Alternate: Nina Kremzar

Note: Israel had initially secured promotion to the B Division by winning the silver medal at the C Division event held earlier in the year. However, as Finland was hosting the B Division event, they were granted a place in the division, resulting in Israel remaining in the C Division.

==== Round robin standings ====
Final Round Robin Standings

Key
Teams to Playoffs

Country	Skip	W	L	W–L	DSC
Latvia	Evelīna Barone	8	1	–	32.481
Estonia	Kerli Laidsalu	6	3	–	47.813
Austria	Verena Pflügler	5	4	1–0	93.681
England	Lisa Farnell	5	4	0–1	57.369
Poland	Aneta Lipinska	4	5	3–1; 1–0	63.675
Slovenia	Ajda Zavrtanik-Drglin	4	5	3–1; 0–1	55.263
Slovakia	Gabriela Kajanová	4	5	2–2	109.188
Hungary	Vera Kalocsai-van Dorp	4	5	1–3; 1–0	50.606
Netherlands	Lisenka Bomas	4	5	1–3; 0–1	60.875
Finland	Tiina Julkunen	1	8	–	119.444

Round Robin Summary Table
Pos.	Country	Austria	England	Estonia	Finland	Hungary	Latvia	Netherlands	Poland	Slovakia	Slovenia	Record
3	Austria	—	9–6	2–10	9–3	7–10	1–10	4–9	12–9	10–4	11–5	5–4
4	England	6–9	—	8–5	10–9	3–9	6–8	8–6	6–3	4–8	9–6	5–4
2	Estonia	10–2	5–8	—	12–0	11–3	6–5	6–9	4–9	8–3	8–6	6–3
10	Finland	3–9	9–10	0–12	—	2–11	3–12	2–11	9–7	4–8	5–11	1–8
8	Hungary	10–7	9–3	3–11	11–2	—	7–12	9–3	6–8	4–7	8–10	4–5
1	Latvia	10–1	8–6	5–6	12–3	12–7	—	8–5	7–5	9–2	12–5	8–1
9	Netherlands	9–4	6–8	9–6	11–2	3–9	5–8	—	7–8	9–1	5–7	4–5
5	Poland	9–12	3–6	9–4	7–9	8–6	5–7	8–7	—	8–12	8–6	4–5
7	Slovakia	4–10	8–4	3–8	8–4	7–4	2–9	1–9	12–8	—	6–7	4–5
6	Slovenia	5–11	6–9	6–8	11–5	10–8	5–12	7–5	6–8	7–6	—	4–5

==== Playoffs ====
Semifinals
1	Latvia	7
4	England	6
2	Estonia	6
3	Austria	2

Gold medal game
1	Latvia	9
2	Estonia	6
Bronze medal game
4	England	10
3	Austria	3

===== Semifinals =====
Saturday, November 29, 9:00 am

Sheet C	1	2	3	4	5	6	7	8	9	10	11	Final
Latvia (Barone) 🔨	0	2	0	1	2	1	0	0	0	0	1	7
England (Farnell)	0	0	0	0	0	0	3	1	1	1	0	6

Sheet D	1	2	3	4	5	6	7	8	9	10	Final
Estonia (Laidsalu) 🔨	0	3	0	0	0	0	2	0	1	X	6
Austria (Pflügler)	0	0	0	0	0	1	0	1	0	X	2

===== Bronze medal game =====
Saturday, November 29, 2:30 pm

Sheet B	1	2	3	4	5	6	7	8	9	10	Final
England (Farnell) 🔨	1	0	0	5	0	2	1	1	X	X	10
Austria (Pflügler)	0	1	1	0	1	0	0	0	X	X	3

===== Gold medal game =====
Saturday, November 29, 2:30 pm

Sheet C	1	2	3	4	5	6	7	8	9	10	Final
Latvia (Barone) 🔨	2	0	0	0	2	0	2	0	2	1	9
Estonia (Laidsalu)	0	2	1	0	0	2	0	1	0	0	6

==== Final standings ====
Place	Team
1st place, gold medalist(s)	Latvia
2nd place, silver medalist(s)	Estonia
3rd place, bronze medalist(s)	England
4	Austria
5	Poland
6	Slovenia
7	Slovakia
8	Hungary
9	Netherlands
10	Finland

=== C Division ===
==== Teams ====
The teams are listed as follows:

Belgium	Finland	Israel	Luxembourg
Fourth: Danielle Berus; Third: Mirte Michiels; Skip: Kim Catteceur; Lead: Elisabeth Rossie; Alternate: Valerie Ziegler	Skip: Jenni Backman; Third: Susanna Santti; Second: Valentina Lemettinen; Lead: Emilia Nordström; Alternate: Elina Virtäla	Skip: Elana Sone; Third: Andrea Stark; Second: Helen Pokras; Lead: Ada Neznamov; Alternate: Elena Solodkaya	Skip: Virginie Hansen; Third: Shiori Kuboki; Second: Betty Spurgeon; Lead: Maja Bjerg-Petersen; Alternate: Carole Remesch
Slovakia	Spain	Ukraine	
Skip: Gabriela Kajanová; Third: Silvia Sýkorová; Second: Daniela Matulová; Lead: Linda Haferová; Alternate: Greta Kapolková	Skip: Leyre Viela; Third: Elena Viela; Second: Nerea Viela; Lead: Izaro de Ocariz; Alternate: Olga Khromchenkova	Skip: Yaroslava Kalinichenko; Third: Diana Moskalenko; Second: Oleksandra Kononenko; Lead: Anastasiia Mosol	

==== Round Robin Standings ====
Final Round Robin Standings

Key
Teams to Playoffs

Country	Skip	W	L	W–L	DSC
Ukraine	Yaroslava Kalinichenko	5	1	1–0	98.71
Slovakia	Gabriela Kajanová	5	1	0–1	102.86
Spain	Leyre Viela	4	2	1–0	71.57
Israel	Elana Sone	4	2	0–1	78.35
Finland	Jenni Backman	2	4	–	61.99
Belgium	Kim Catteceur	1	5	–	70.43
Luxembourg	Virginie Hansen	0	6	–	112.06

Round Robin Summary Table
Pos.	Country	Belgium	Finland	Israel	Luxembourg	Slovakia	Spain	Ukraine	Record
6	Belgium	—	3–10	3–6	7–5	1–5	6–7	4–12	1–5
5	Finland	10–3	—	3–8	8–1	7–10	4–7	2–6	2–4
4	Israel	6–3	8–3	—	7–5	5–8	4–6	9–3	4–2
7	Luxembourg	5–7	1–8	5–7	—	3–9	0–14	3–10	0–6
2	Slovakia	5–1	10–7	8–5	9–3	—	7–4	3–5	5–1
3	Spain	7–6	7–4	6–4	14–0	4–7	—	2–9	4–2
1	Ukraine	12–4	6–2	3–9	10–3	5–3	9–2	—	5–1

==== Playoffs ====
Semifinals
1	Ukraine	4
4	Israel	7
2	Slovakia	6
3	Spain	5

Gold medal game
4	Israel	2
2	Slovakia	9
Bronze medal game
1	Ukraine	3
3	Spain	7

===== Semifinals =====
Thursday, May 1, 10:00

Sheet B	1	2	3	4	5	6	7	8	Final
Slovakia (Kajanová) 🔨	0	2	2	0	0	0	1	1	6
Spain (Viela)	0	0	0	1	3	1	0	0	5

Sheet D	1	2	3	4	5	6	7	8	Final
Ukraine (Kalinichenko) 🔨	0	0	0	1	1	1	0	1	4
Israel (Sone)	1	2	2	0	0	0	2	0	7

===== Bronze medal game =====
Thursday, May 1, 15:00

Sheet E	1	2	3	4	5	6	7	8	Final
Ukraine (Kalinichenko) 🔨	0	0	1	1	0	0	1	X	3
Spain (Viela)	3	1	0	0	1	2	0	X	7

===== Gold medal game =====
Thursday, May 1, 15:00

Sheet C	1	2	3	4	5	6	7	8	Final
Slovakia (Kajanová) 🔨	2	2	0	0	2	0	3	X	9
Israel (Sone)	0	0	0	1	0	1	0	X	2

==== Final standings ====
Key
Promoted to 2025 B division

Place	Team
1st place, gold medalist(s)	Slovakia
2nd place, silver medalist(s)	Israel
3rd place, bronze medalist(s)	Spain
4	Ukraine
5	Finland
6	Belgium
7	Luxembourg
