= 2024 Mercure Perth Masters =

- Host city: Perth, Scotland
- Arena: Dewars Centre
- Dates: 4–7 January
- Men's winner: (Scotland) Team Mouat
- Curling club: Gogar Park CC, Edinburgh
- Skip: Bruce Mouat
- Third: Grant Hardie
- Second: Bobby Lammie
- Lead: Hammy McMillan Jr.
- Coach: Michael Goodfellow
- Finalist: (Scotland) Ross Whyte
- Women's winner: (Canada) Team Grandy
- Curling club: Vancouver CC, Vancouver
- Skip: Clancy Grandy
- Third: Kayla MacMillan
- Second: Lindsay Dubue
- Lead: Sarah Loken
- Coach: Katie Witt
- Finalist: (Scotland) Jackie Lockhart

The 2024 Mercure Perth Masters were held from 4 to 7 January at the Dewars Centre in Perth, Scotland. The total purse for the event was £17,000 on the men's side and £10,000 on the women's side.

== Men ==
=== Teams ===
The teams are listed as follows:

Skip	Third	Second	Lead	Alternate	Locale
Michael Brunner	Anthony Petoud	Romano Meier	Andreas Gerlach		Bern, Switzerland
Cameron Bryce	Duncan Menzies	Luke Carson	Robin McCall		Border, Scotland
Orrin Carson	Logan Carson	Archie Hyslop	Charlie Gibb		Stirling, Scotland
James Craik	Mark Watt	Angus Bryce	Blair Haswell		Forfar, Scotland
Ross Craik	Scott Hyslop	Struan Carson	Jack Carrick		Stirling, Scotland
Marco Hösli	Philipp Hösli	Simon Gloor	Justin Hausherr		Glarus, Switzerland
Lukas Høstmælingen	Grunde Buraas	Magnus Lillebø	Tinius Haslev Nordbye		Oslo, Norway
Manuel Jermann	Yannick Jermann	Kenjo von Allmen	Simon Hanhart		Arlesheim, Switzerland
Lukáš Klíma	Marek Černovský	Martin Jurík	Lukáš Klípa	Radek Boháč	Prague, Czech Republic
Axel Landelius	Alfons Johansson	Johan Engqvist	Alexander Palm		Mjölby, Sweden
Yusuke Morozumi	Yuta Matsumura	Ryotaro Shukuya	Masaki Iwai	Kosuke Morozumi	Karuizawa, Japan
Bruce Mouat	Grant Hardie	Bobby Lammie	Hammy McMillan Jr.		Stirling, Scotland
Glen Muirhead	Thomas Muirhead	Callum Kinnear	–		Perth, Scotland
Eduard Nikolov	Yaroslav Shchur	Artem Suhak	Vladyslav Koval	Artem Hasynets	Kyiv, Ukraine
Magnus Ramsfjell	Martin Sesaker	Bendik Ramsfjell	Gaute Nepstad		Trondheim, Norway
Rob Retchless	Jotham Sugden	Scott Gibson	Jonathan Havercroft	Felix Price	Preston, England
Alberto Pimpini (Fourth)	Fabio Ribotta (Skip)	Simone Gonin	Fabrizio Gallo		Pinerolo, Italy
Andrin Schnider	Dean Hürlimann	Marco Hefti	Nicola Stoll		Schaffhausen, Switzerland
David Šik	Tomáš Maček	Kryštof Tabery	Libor Čeloud		Prague, Czech Republic
Floris Ros (Fourth)	Hessel Janssens	Simon Spits (Skip)	Bart Klomp		Zoetermeer, Netherlands
Yves Stocker	Kim Schwaller	Felix Eberhard	Tom Winkelhausen		Zug, Switzerland
Sixten Totzek	Joshua Sutor	Magnus Sutor	Jan-Luca Häg		Füssen, Germany
Kyle Waddell	Craig Waddell	Mark Taylor	Gavin Barr		Hamilton, Scotland
Ross Whyte	Robin Brydone	Duncan McFadzean	Euan Kyle		Stirling, Scotland

=== Round robin standings ===
Final Round Robin Standings

Key
Teams to Playoffs

Pool A	W	L	PF	PA
(Switzerland) Michael Brunner	4	1	34	21
(Scotland) Bruce Mouat	4	1	31	20
(Germany) Sixten Totzek	3	2	32	36
(Switzerland) Marco Hösli	2	3	29	32
(Scotland) Ross Craik	1	4	20	32
(Italy) Fabio Ribotta	1	4	23	28

Pool B	W	L	PF	PA
(Scotland) Ross Whyte	5	0	34	12
(Switzerland) Yves Stocker	4	1	32	27
(Scotland) Glen Muirhead	3	2	26	20
(Czech Republic) Lukáš Klíma	2	3	20	22
(Sweden) Axel Landelius	1	4	21	34
(Ukraine) Eduard Nikolov	0	5	16	34

Pool C	W	L	PF	PA
(Norway) Magnus Ramsfjell	5	0	36	11
(Scotland) Cameron Bryce	3	2	32	22
(Japan) Yusuke Morozumi	3	2	27	21
(Switzerland) Andrin Schnider	2	3	28	29
(Scotland) Orrin Carson	1	4	23	37
(Czech Republic) David Šik	1	4	14	40

Pool D	W	L	PF	PA
(Norway) Lukas Høstmælingen	4	1	28	22
(Scotland) Kyle Waddell	4	1	39	20
(Scotland) James Craik	4	1	31	17
(England) Rob Retchless	2	3	25	27
(Switzerland) Manuel Jermann	1	4	17	30
(Netherlands) Simon Spits	0	5	14	38

=== Round robin results ===
All draw times are listed in Greenwich Mean Time (UTC+00:00).

==== Draw 2 ====
Thursday, 4 January, 5:30 pm

Sheet B	1	2	3	4	5	6	7	8	Final
(Scotland) Bruce Mouat	2	0	3	4	1	X	X	X	10
(Germany) Sixten Totzek	0	1	0	0	0	X	X	X	1

Sheet C	1	2	3	4	5	6	7	8	Final
(Switzerland) Marco Hösli	1	0	2	0	1	1	0	2	7
(Italy) Fabio Ribotta	0	2	0	1	0	0	3	0	6

Sheet D	1	2	3	4	5	6	7	8	Final
(Switzerland) Michael Brunner	1	0	0	1	2	3	X	X	7
(Scotland) Ross Craik	0	1	1	0	0	0	X	X	2

Sheet E	1	2	3	4	5	6	7	8	Final
(Scotland) Ross Whyte	2	2	0	1	0	0	1	X	6
(Czech Republic) Lukáš Klíma	0	0	1	0	0	1	0	X	2

Sheet F	1	2	3	4	5	6	7	8	Final
(Scotland) Glen Muirhead	0	1	0	1	3	1	0	X	6
(Ukraine) Eduard Nikolov	1	0	1	0	0	0	2	X	4

Sheet G	1	2	3	4	5	6	7	8	Final
(Switzerland) Yves Stocker	0	0	0	2	3	3	0	X	8
(Sweden) Axel Landelius	1	1	3	0	0	0	2	X	7

==== Draw 3 ====
Thursday, 4 January, 8:00 pm

Sheet A	1	2	3	4	5	6	7	8	Final
(Norway) Magnus Ramsfjell	0	1	1	1	0	2	0	1	6
(Switzerland) Andrin Schnider	0	0	0	0	1	0	3	0	4

Sheet B	1	2	3	4	5	6	7	8	Final
(Japan) Yusuke Morozumi	2	1	4	2	X	X	X	X	9
(Czech Republic) David Šik	0	0	0	0	X	X	X	X	0

Sheet C	1	2	3	4	5	6	7	8	Final
(Scotland) Cameron Bryce	2	0	4	4	X	X	X	X	10
(Scotland) Orrin Carson	0	1	0	0	X	X	X	X	1

Sheet D	1	2	3	4	5	6	7	8	Final
(Netherlands) Simon Spits	1	0	1	0	0	1	0	X	3
(England) Rob Retchless	0	0	0	4	2	0	2	X	8

Sheet E	1	2	3	4	5	6	7	8	Final
(Scotland) James Craik	0	1	0	1	0	1	0	X	3
(Norway) Lukas Høstmælingen	2	0	1	0	2	0	2	X	7

Sheet F	1	2	3	4	5	6	7	8	Final
(Scotland) Kyle Waddell	0	0	1	1	2	4	X	X	8
(Switzerland) Manuel Jermann	0	1	0	0	0	0	X	X	1

==== Draw 4 ====
Friday, 5 January, 8:00 am

Sheet A	1	2	3	4	5	6	7	8	Final
(Scotland) Ross Whyte	3	0	0	4	3	X	X	X	10
(Sweden) Axel Landelius	0	0	1	0	0	X	X	X	1

Sheet B	1	2	3	4	5	6	7	8	Final
(Scotland) Glen Muirhead	0	1	0	1	2	0	1	X	5
(Czech Republic) Lukáš Klíma	0	0	1	0	0	1	0	X	2

Sheet C	Final
(Switzerland) Yves Stocker	8
(Ukraine) Eduard Nikolov	6

Sheet D	1	2	3	4	5	6	7	8	Final
(Scotland) Bruce Mouat	0	0	0	1	0	3	1	1	6
(Italy) Fabio Ribotta	0	0	2	0	1	0	0	0	3

Sheet E	1	2	3	4	5	6	7	8	9	Final
(Switzerland) Michael Brunner	0	0	0	2	0	3	1	0	3	9
(Germany) Sixten Totzek	0	0	2	0	2	0	0	2	0	6

Sheet F	1	2	3	4	5	6	7	8	Final
(Switzerland) Marco Hösli	1	0	5	0	3	0	X	X	9
(Scotland) Ross Craik	0	1	0	2	0	1	X	X	4

==== Draw 5 ====
Friday, 5 January, 10:45 am

Sheet C	1	2	3	4	5	6	7	8	Final
(Netherlands) Simon Spits	0	0	0	1	0	1	0	X	2
(Norway) Lukas Høstmælingen	0	2	1	0	2	0	3	X	8

Sheet D	1	2	3	4	5	6	7	8	Final
(Japan) Yusuke Morozumi	1	0	1	0	3	0	2	X	7
(Switzerland) Andrin Schnider	0	2	0	2	0	1	0	X	5

Sheet E	1	2	3	4	5	6	7	8	Final
(Scotland) Kyle Waddell	0	1	1	3	0	1	0	1	7
(England) Rob Retchless	1	0	0	0	2	0	1	0	4

Sheet F	1	2	3	4	5	6	7	8	Final
(Norway) Magnus Ramsfjell	2	0	3	2	1	X	X	X	8
(Scotland) Orrin Carson	0	3	0	0	0	X	X	X	3

Sheet G	1	2	3	4	5	6	7	8	Final
(Scotland) James Craik	2	2	1	2	X	X	X	X	7
(Switzerland) Manuel Jermann	0	0	0	0	X	X	X	X	0

Sheet H	1	2	3	4	5	6	7	8	Final
(Scotland) Cameron Bryce	2	0	0	0	3	2	2	X	9
(Czech Republic) David Šik	0	1	1	1	0	0	0	X	3

==== Draw 6 ====
Friday, 5 January, 2:00 pm

Sheet A	1	2	3	4	5	6	7	8	9	Final
(Scotland) Glen Muirhead	1	1	0	0	0	0	0	2	0	4
(Switzerland) Yves Stocker	0	0	1	1	0	2	0	0	1	5

Sheet B	1	2	3	4	5	6	7	8	Final
(Ukraine) Eduard Nikolov	0	0	0	1	X	X	X	X	1
(Scotland) Ross Whyte	4	1	2	0	X	X	X	X	7

Sheet C	1	2	3	4	5	6	7	8	Final
(Czech Republic) Lukáš Klíma	1	0	2	1	1	0	0	X	5
(Sweden) Axel Landelius	0	1	0	0	0	1	1	X	3

Sheet F	1	2	3	4	5	6	7	8	Final
(Germany) Sixten Totzek	1	0	4	0	0	3	0	X	8
(Italy) Fabio Ribotta	0	1	0	1	2	0	1	X	5

Sheet G	1	2	3	4	5	6	7	8	Final
(Switzerland) Michael Brunner	0	0	3	1	1	2	X	X	7
(Switzerland) Marco Hösli	1	2	0	0	0	0	X	X	3

Sheet H	1	2	3	4	5	6	7	8	Final
(Scotland) Ross Craik	0	0	1	0	2	X	X	X	3
(Scotland) Bruce Mouat	2	1	0	2	0	X	X	X	5

==== Draw 7 ====
Friday, 5 January, 4:30 pm

Sheet A	1	2	3	4	5	6	7	8	Final
(Netherlands) Simon Spits	3	0	1	0	1	0	1	0	6
(Scotland) Kyle Waddell	0	2	0	2	0	1	0	2	7

Sheet B	1	2	3	4	5	6	7	8	Final
(England) Rob Retchless	0	1	0	0	0	1	0	X	2
(Scotland) James Craik	1	0	1	1	1	0	2	X	6

Sheet D	1	2	3	4	5	6	7	8	Final
(Norway) Lukas Høstmælingen	1	0	1	0	3	1	0	X	6
(Switzerland) Manuel Jermann	0	1	0	1	0	0	1	X	3

Sheet E	1	2	3	4	5	6	7	8	9	Final
(Switzerland) Andrin Schnider	0	2	0	2	0	2	0	1	1	8
(Scotland) Orrin Carson	1	0	2	0	3	0	1	0	0	7

Sheet F	1	2	3	4	5	6	7	8	Final
(Japan) Yusuke Morozumi	0	2	0	0	1	0	0	X	3
(Scotland) Cameron Bryce	1	0	0	2	0	1	4	X	8

Sheet G	1	2	3	4	5	6	7	8	Final
(Czech Republic) David Šik	1	0	0	0	0	X	X	X	1
(Norway) Magnus Ramsfjell	0	1	2	2	4	X	X	X	9

==== Draw 8 ====
Saturday, 6 January, 8:30 am

Sheet A	1	2	3	4	5	6	7	8	Final
(Scotland) Orrin Carson	0	0	0	1	0	0	1	0	2
(Japan) Yusuke Morozumi	2	0	1	0	1	1	0	1	6

Sheet B	1	2	3	4	5	6	7	8	9	Final
(Switzerland) Marco Hösli	0	2	0	1	0	0	0	2	0	5
(Scotland) Bruce Mouat	1	0	1	0	1	2	0	0	1	6

Sheet C	1	2	3	4	5	6	7	8	Final
(Scotland) Kyle Waddell	0	1	1	0	1	0	3	0	6
(Scotland) James Craik	2	0	0	3	0	1	0	1	7

Sheet D	1	2	3	4	5	6	7	8	Final
(Scotland) Cameron Bryce	0	0	1	0	0	X	X	X	1
(Norway) Magnus Ramsfjell	1	1	0	3	2	X	X	X	7

Sheet E	1	2	3	4	5	6	7	8	Final
(Switzerland) Yves Stocker	2	0	0	1	0	0	2	0	5
(Scotland) Ross Whyte	0	2	1	0	0	1	0	2	6

Sheet F	1	2	3	4	5	6	7	8	Final
(Czech Republic) David Šik	0	0	2	0	0	1	1	1	5
(Switzerland) Andrin Schnider	1	0	0	1	1	0	0	0	3

Sheet G	1	2	3	4	5	6	7	8	Final
(Switzerland) Manuel Jermann	2	0	1	2	2	X	X	X	7
(Netherlands) Simon Spits	0	1	0	0	0	X	X	X	1

Sheet H	1	2	3	4	5	6	7	8	Final
(England) Rob Retchless	0	0	2	0	0	1	0	X	3
(Norway) Lukas Høstmælingen	0	2	0	1	1	0	1	X	5

==== Draw 9 ====
Saturday, 6 January, 11:15 am

Sheet A	1	2	3	4	5	6	7	8	Final
(Ukraine) Eduard Nikolov	1	1	0	0	0	0	X	X	2
(Czech Republic) Lukáš Klíma	0	0	2	2	2	1	X	X	7

Sheet D	1	2	3	4	5	6	7	8	Final
(Sweden) Axel Landelius	0	0	2	1	0	1	0	X	4
(Scotland) Glen Muirhead	2	2	0	0	2	0	2	X	8

Sheet F	1	2	3	4	5	6	7	8	Final
(Scotland) Ross Craik	0	0	4	0	3	0	0	0	7
(Germany) Sixten Totzek	1	1	0	2	0	1	2	1	8

Sheet H	1	2	3	4	5	6	7	8	Final
(Italy) Fabio Ribotta	0	1	1	2	0	0	2	X	6
(Switzerland) Michael Brunner	0	0	0	0	2	1	0	X	3

==== Draw 10 ====
Saturday, 6 January, 2:45 pm

Sheet A	1	2	3	4	5	6	7	8	Final
(Switzerland) Manuel Jermann	1	0	0	3	0	1	1	X	6
(England) Rob Retchless	0	3	1	0	4	0	0	X	8

Sheet C	1	2	3	4	5	6	7	8	Final
(Switzerland) Andrin Schnider	1	1	0	0	1	0	3	2	8
(Scotland) Cameron Bryce	0	0	1	2	0	1	0	0	4

Sheet D	1	2	3	4	5	6	7	8	Final
(Scotland) Orrin Carson	1	2	0	2	0	1	0	4	10
(Czech Republic) David Šik	0	0	2	0	2	0	1	0	5

Sheet E	1	2	3	4	5	6	7	8	Final
(Norway) Magnus Ramsfjell	0	0	2	2	1	0	1	X	6
(Japan) Yusuke Morozumi	0	1	0	0	0	1	0	X	2

Sheet G	1	2	3	4	5	6	7	8	Final
(Norway) Lukas Høstmælingen	0	2	0	0	0	X	X	X	2
(Scotland) Kyle Waddell	0	0	4	3	4	X	X	X	11

Sheet H	1	2	3	4	5	6	7	8	Final
(Scotland) James Craik	0	4	3	1	0	X	X	X	8
(Netherlands) Simon Spits	0	0	0	0	2	X	X	X	2

==== Draw 11 ====
Saturday, 6 January, 5:30 pm

Sheet A	1	2	3	4	5	6	7	8	Final
(Italy) Fabio Ribotta	0	1	0	0	1	1	0	0	3
(Scotland) Ross Craik	1	0	0	0	0	0	2	1	4

Sheet B	1	2	3	4	5	6	7	8	Final
(Scotland) Ross Whyte	0	1	0	1	0	2	0	1	5
(Scotland) Glen Muirhead	0	0	1	0	1	0	1	0	3

Sheet C	1	2	3	4	5	6	7	8	Final
(Germany) Sixten Totzek	1	0	2	0	3	0	1	2	9
(Switzerland) Marco Hösli	0	2	0	1	0	2	0	0	5

Sheet E	1	2	3	4	5	6	7	8	Final
(Sweden) Axel Landelius	2	0	2	0	2	0	0	X	6
(Ukraine) Eduard Nikolov	0	1	0	1	0	1	0	X	3

Sheet F	1	2	3	4	5	6	7	8	Final
(Scotland) Bruce Mouat	1	1	0	1	0	1	X	X	4
(Switzerland) Michael Brunner	0	0	3	0	5	0	X	X	8

Sheet H	1	2	3	4	5	6	7	8	Final
(Czech Republic) Lukáš Klíma	0	1	1	0	0	0	2	0	4
(Switzerland) Yves Stocker	2	0	0	0	2	1	0	1	6

=== Playoffs ===
Quarterfinals
A1	(Switzerland) Michael Brunner	5
C2	(Scotland) Cameron Bryce	3
B1	(Scotland) Ross Whyte	6
B2	(Switzerland) Yves Stocker	4
(Pairings are reseeded after the first round)
C1	(Norway) Magnus Ramsfjell	2
D2	(Scotland) Kyle Waddell	6
D1	(Norway) Lukas Høstmælingen	6
A2	(Scotland) Bruce Mouat	7

Semifinals
B1	(Scotland) Ross Whyte	6
D2	(Scotland) Kyle Waddell	2
A1	(Switzerland) Michael Brunner	2
A2	(Scotland) Bruce Mouat	6

Final
B1	(Scotland) Ross Whyte	3
A2	(Scotland) Bruce Mouat	4

==== Quarterfinals ====
Sunday, 7 January, 8:00 am

Sheet B	1	2	3	4	5	6	7	8	Final
(Norway) Magnus Ramsfjell	1	0	1	0	0	0	X	X	2
(Scotland) Kyle Waddell	0	2	0	1	1	2	X	X	6

Sheet D	1	2	3	4	5	6	7	8	Final
(Switzerland) Michael Brunner	2	1	0	0	0	1	1	X	5
(Scotland) Cameron Bryce	0	0	1	1	1	0	0	X	3

Sheet E	1	2	3	4	5	6	7	8	Final
(Scotland) Ross Whyte	0	1	0	1	0	1	0	3	6
(Switzerland) Yves Stocker	1	0	2	0	0	0	1	0	4

Sheet F	1	2	3	4	5	6	7	8	Final
(Norway) Lukas Høstmælingen	1	0	1	1	0	0	3	0	6
(Scotland) Bruce Mouat	0	4	0	0	2	0	0	1	7

==== Semifinals ====
Sunday, 7 January, 11:00 am

Sheet C	1	2	3	4	5	6	7	8	Final
(Scotland) Ross Whyte	0	0	1	1	0	2	0	2	6
(Scotland) Kyle Waddell	0	0	0	0	2	0	0	0	2

Sheet E	1	2	3	4	5	6	7	8	Final
(Switzerland) Michael Brunner	1	0	0	1	0	0	0	X	2
(Scotland) Bruce Mouat	0	0	3	0	0	2	1	X	6

==== Final ====
Sunday, 7 January, 3:30 pm

Sheet D	1	2	3	4	5	6	7	8	9	Final
(Scotland) Ross Whyte	0	1	0	0	0	2	0	0	0	3
(Scotland) Bruce Mouat	1	0	0	1	0	0	0	1	1	4

== Women ==
=== Teams ===
The teams are listed as follows:

Skip	Third	Second	Lead	Alternate	Locale
Torild Bjørnstad	Nora Østgård	Ingeborg Forbregd	Eilin Kjærland		Oppdal, Norway
Lucy Blair	Karlyn Lyon	Amy Mitchell	Susie Smith		Stirling, Scotland
Clancy Grandy	Kayla MacMillan	Lindsay Dubue	Sarah Loken		Vancouver, British Columbia, Canada
Fay Henderson	Hailey Duff	Amy MacDonald	Katie McMillan		Stirling, Scotland
Corrie Hürlimann	Celine Schwizgebel	Sarah Müller	Marina Lörtscher		Zug, Switzerland
Danielle Inglis	Kira Brunton	Calissa Daly	Cassandra de Groot		Ottawa, Ontario, Canada
Yaroslava Kalinichenko	Diana Moskalenko	Anastasiia Mosol	Marharyta Lytvynenko		Kyiv, Ukraine
Jackie Lockhart	Mairi Milne	Wendy Johnston	Katie Loudon		Perth, Scotland
Rebecca Morrison	Jennifer Dodds	Gina Aitken	Sophie Jackson	Sophie Sinclair	Stirling, Scotland
Robyn Munro	Lisa Davie	Holly Wilkie-Milne	Laura Watt		Stirling, Scotland
Fran Stretton	Morna Aitken				Perth, Scotland

=== Round robin standings ===
Final Round Robin Standings

Key
Teams to Playoffs

Pool A	W	L	PF	PA
(Scotland) Rebecca Morrison	5	0	36	8
(Canada) Clancy Grandy	4	1	35	15
(Scotland) Jackie Lockhart	3	2	34	19
(Norway) Torild Bjørnstad	2	3	23	24
(Scotland) Fran Stretton	1	4	14	40
(Ukraine) Yaroslava Kalinichenko	0	5	10	46

Pool B	W	L	PF	PA
(Canada) Danielle Inglis	4	0	36	14
(Scotland) Robyn Munro	3	1	26	23
(Scotland) Lucy Blair	2	2	25	26
(Switzerland) Corrie Hürlimann	1	3	16	31
(Scotland) Fay Henderson	0	4	16	25

=== Round robin results ===
All draw times are listed in Greenwich Mean Time (UTC+00:00).

==== Draw 1 ====
Thursday, 4 January, 1:00 pm

Sheet B	1	2	3	4	5	6	7	8	Final
(Switzerland) Corrie Hürlimann	0	0	0	3	0	0	X	X	3
(Scotland) Lucy Blair	2	4	0	0	3	1	X	X	10

Sheet E	1	2	3	4	5	6	7	8	Final
(Scotland) Rebecca Morrison	5	1	2	0	3	0	X	X	11
(Scotland) Fran Stretton	0	0	0	1	0	1	X	X	2

Sheet G	1	2	3	4	5	6	7	8	Final
(Canada) Clancy Grandy	0	3	1	0	3	3	3	X	13
(Ukraine) Yaroslava Kalinichenko	0	0	0	1	0	0	0	X	1

==== Draw 2 ====
Thursday, 4 January, 5:30 pm

Sheet A	1	2	3	4	5	6	7	8	Final
(Scotland) Jackie Lockhart	1	1	2	2	2	X	X	X	8
(Norway) Torild Bjørnstad	0	0	0	0	0	X	X	X	0

Sheet H	1	2	3	4	5	6	7	8	Final
(Scotland) Robyn Munro	0	0	0	2	0	3	0	0	5
(Canada) Danielle Inglis	0	0	3	0	1	0	3	1	8

==== Draw 3 ====
Thursday, 4 January, 8:00 pm

Sheet G	1	2	3	4	5	6	7	8	Final
(Switzerland) Corrie Hürlimann	1	0	0	0	0	1	0	2	4
(Scotland) Fay Henderson	0	1	0	0	0	0	2	0	3

Sheet H	1	2	3	4	5	6	7	8	Final
(Canada) Clancy Grandy	1	0	2	2	3	1	X	X	9
(Scotland) Fran Stretton	0	1	0	0	0	0	X	X	1

==== Draw 4 ====
Friday, 5 January, 8:00 am

Sheet G	1	2	3	4	5	6	7	8	Final
(Scotland) Robyn Munro	0	1	2	0	2	1	0	2	8
(Scotland) Lucy Blair	1	0	0	2	0	0	2	0	5

Sheet H	1	2	3	4	5	6	7	8	Final
(Scotland) Jackie Lockhart	3	0	1	3	0	0	4	X	11
(Ukraine) Yaroslava Kalinichenko	0	1	0	0	1	1	0	X	3

==== Draw 5 ====
Friday, 5 January, 10:45 am

Sheet A	1	2	3	4	5	6	7	8	Final
(Scotland) Fay Henderson	0	0	0	0	2	0	X	X	2
(Canada) Danielle Inglis	2	0	2	2	0	1	X	X	7

Sheet B	1	2	3	4	5	6	7	8	Final
(Scotland) Fran Stretton	0	0	0	0	1	2	0	X	3
(Norway) Torild Bjørnstad	4	1	1	1	0	0	1	X	8

==== Draw 6 ====
Friday, 5 January, 2:00 pm

Sheet D	1	2	3	4	5	6	7	8	Final
(Switzerland) Corrie Hürlimann	0	0	3	0	0	2	0	0	5
(Scotland) Robyn Munro	1	1	0	2	0	0	1	1	6

Sheet E	1	2	3	4	5	6	7	8	Final
(Canada) Clancy Grandy	2	0	2	0	1	1	0	1	7
(Scotland) Jackie Lockhart	0	1	0	1	0	0	2	0	4

==== Draw 7 ====
Friday, 5 January, 4:30 pm

Sheet C	1	2	3	4	5	6	7	8	Final
(Ukraine) Yaroslava Kalinichenko	0	0	0	0	0	0	X	X	0
(Scotland) Rebecca Morrison	2	1	1	1	1	1	X	X	7

==== Draw 9 ====
Saturday, 6 January, 11:15 am

Sheet C	1	2	3	4	5	6	7	8	Final
(Norway) Torild Bjørnstad	1	1	0	1	0	0	0	0	3
(Canada) Clancy Grandy	0	0	1	0	1	2	0	1	5

Sheet E	1	2	3	4	5	6	7	8	Final
(Scotland) Jackie Lockhart	0	1	1	0	0	0	1	0	3
(Scotland) Rebecca Morrison	2	0	0	0	2	1	0	1	6

Sheet G	1	2	3	4	5	6	7	8	Final
(Canada) Danielle Inglis	0	2	2	4	0	4	X	X	12
(Switzerland) Corrie Hürlimann	1	0	0	0	3	0	X	X	4

==== Draw 10 ====
Saturday, 6 January, 2:45 pm

Sheet B	1	2	3	4	5	6	7	8	Final
(Scotland) Lucy Blair	0	1	0	0	3	2	0	1	7
(Scotland) Fay Henderson	1	0	2	1	0	0	2	0	6

Sheet F	1	2	3	4	5	6	7	8	Final
(Ukraine) Yaroslava Kalinichenko	1	0	0	1	0	0	1	1	4
(Scotland) Fran Stretton	0	1	1	0	1	2	0	0	5

==== Draw 11 ====
Saturday, 6 January, 5:30 pm

Sheet G	1	2	3	4	5	6	7	8	Final
(Scotland) Rebecca Morrison	0	0	2	0	2	1	1	X	6
(Norway) Torild Bjørnstad	0	0	0	2	0	0	0	X	2

==== Draw 12 ====
Saturday, 6 January, 9:00 pm

Sheet B	1	2	3	4	5	6	7	8	Final
(Scotland) Rebecca Morrison	2	1	0	2	1	X	X	X	6
(Canada) Clancy Grandy	0	0	1	0	0	X	X	X	1

Sheet D	1	2	3	4	5	6	7	8	Final
(Norway) Torild Bjørnstad	1	1	3	0	5	X	X	X	10
(Ukraine) Yaroslava Kalinichenko	0	0	0	2	0	X	X	X	2

Sheet E	1	2	3	4	5	6	7	8	Final
(Canada) Danielle Inglis	0	3	0	4	2	X	X	X	9
(Scotland) Lucy Blair	0	0	3	0	0	X	X	X	3

Sheet F	1	2	3	4	5	6	7	8	Final
(Scotland) Fay Henderson	0	1	1	0	2	0	0	1	5
(Scotland) Robyn Munro	3	0	0	2	0	1	1	0	7

Sheet G	1	2	3	4	5	6	7	8	Final
(Scotland) Fran Stretton	1	0	0	2	0	0	0	X	3
(Scotland) Jackie Lockhart	0	2	2	0	2	1	1	X	8

=== Playoffs ===
Quarterfinals
B2	(Scotland) Robyn Munro	4
A3	(Scotland) Jackie Lockhart	10
A2	(Canada) Clancy Grandy	7
B3	(Scotland) Lucy Blair	0

Semifinals
A1	(Scotland) Rebecca Morrison	2
A3	(Scotland) Jackie Lockhart	7
B1	(Canada) Danielle Inglis	4
A2	(Canada) Clancy Grandy	7

Final
A3	(Scotland) Jackie Lockhart	3
A2	(Canada) Clancy Grandy	8

==== Quarterfinals ====
Sunday, 7 January, 8:00 am

Sheet C	1	2	3	4	5	6	7	8	Final
(Scotland) Robyn Munro	1	0	2	0	0	1	0	0	4
(Scotland) Jackie Lockhart	0	2	0	1	0	0	3	4	10

Sheet G	1	2	3	4	5	6	7	8	Final
(Canada) Clancy Grandy	1	1	2	2	1	X	X	X	7
(Scotland) Lucy Blair	0	0	0	0	0	X	X	X	0

==== Semifinals ====
Sunday, 7 January, 11:00 am

Sheet D	1	2	3	4	5	6	7	8	Final
(Scotland) Rebecca Morrison	0	0	2	0	0	0	0	X	2
(Scotland) Jackie Lockhart	0	1	0	3	1	1	1	X	7

Sheet F	1	2	3	4	5	6	7	8	Final
(Canada) Danielle Inglis	1	0	2	0	0	1	0	X	4
(Canada) Clancy Grandy	0	3	0	0	3	0	1	X	7

==== Final ====
Sunday, 7 January, 2:00 pm

Sheet E	1	2	3	4	5	6	7	8	Final
(Scotland) Jackie Lockhart	0	1	0	2	0	X	X	X	3
(Canada) Clancy Grandy	2	0	3	0	3	X	X	X	8
