= Jotham Sugden =

English curler (born 2001)

- Curler ♂
- Born: 6 August 2001 (age 25); Warwick, England

Team
- Skip: Rob Retchless
- Third: Jotham Sugden
- Second: Scott Gibson
- Lead: Jonathan Havercroft
- Coach: David Ramsay

Curling career
- Member Association: England
- European Championship: 1 (2024)
- Other appearances: European Curling Championships B-Division: 1 (2023)
Medal record
Men's curling
Representing England
European B Championships
Gold medal – first place	2023 Perth

Jotham "Joe" Sugden (born 6 August 2001) is an English curler. He is currently the vice-skip of the English men's curling team.

At the national level, he is a two-time English men's champion curler (2023, 2024).

== Teams ==
Season	Skip	Third	Second	Lead	Alternate	Coach	Events
2017–2018	Jake Barker	Jotham Sugden	Ben Holley	Felix Price		Oliver Kendall, Jonathan Havercroft	WJBCC 2018 (19th)
2018–2019	Jotham Sugden	Felix Price	Archer Woods	Harry Pinnell		Jonathan Havercroft	WJBCC 2019 (Jan) (5th)
2019–2020	Jotham Sugden	Felix Price	Archer Woods	Harry Pinnell		Jonathan Havercroft, James Burman	WJBCC 2019 (Dec) (14th)
2021–22	Jotham Sugden	Felix Price	Archer Woods	Harry Pinnell			EngMCC 2022 (silver)
2022–23	Rob Retchless	Jotham Sugden	Jonathan Havercroft	Harry Pinnell		David Ramsay	EngMCC 2023 (gold)
2023–24	Rob Retchless	Jotham Sugden	Scott Gibson	Jonathan Havercroft	Felix Price	David Ramsay	ECC B 2023 (gold) , EngMCC 2024 (gold)
2024–25	Rob Retchless	Jotham Sugden	Scott Gibson	Jonathan Havercroft	Colin Mouat	David Ramsay	ECC 2024 (10th)
