= Rob Retchless =

English curler

- Curler
- Born: October 2, 1984 (age 42); Quebec, Canada

Team
- Skip: Rob Retchless
- Third: Jotham Sugden
- Second: Scott Gibson
- Lead: Jonathan Havercroft
- Mixed doubles partner: Ashley Waye
- Coach: David Ramsay

Curling career
- Member Association: Quebec (1998-2008); Ontario (2008–2019); England (2019–present)
- European Championship: 1 (2024)
- Other appearances: 2 (2018 Ontario Tankard, 2019 Ontario Tankard)
Medal record
Men's curling
English Championship
Silver medal – second place	2020 Dumfries
Gold medal – first place	2023 Dumfries
Gold medal – first place	2024 Dumfries

Rob Retchless (born October 2, 1984) is an English–Canadian curler. He is currently the skip of the English men's curling team.

At the national level, he is a two-time English men's champion curler (2023, 2024).

Retchless is a graduate of Queen's University at Kingston. He works as a software engineering director at Wolters Kluwer. He is eligible to curl for England by birthright. He began curling for England while still living in Toronto. He is currently living in Europe.

== Teams ==
=== Men's ===
Season	Skip	Third	Second	Lead	Alternate	Coach	Events
Canada
2006-07	Claude Brazeau Jr.	Martin Roy	Rob Retchless	Adam Osseyrane			
2007-08	Ghyslain Richard	Rob Retchless	Daniel Camber	David Leroux			
2008-09	Garth Mitchell	Rob Retchless	Geoffrey Johnson	Dave Pallen			
2009-10	Tim Morrison	Cary Luner	Rob Retchless	Bruce Scott			
2010-11	Garth Mitchell	Rob Retchless	Geoffrey Johnson	Brendon Lavell			
2011-12	Garth Mitchell	Rob Retchless	Geoffrey Johnson	Terence Yip			
2012-13	Ian Robertson	Guy Racette	Rob Retchless	Rob Ainsley			
2013-14	Rob Retchless	Punit Sthankiya	Dave Ellis	Rob Ainsley			(gold) Ingersoll Clash
2014-15	Rob Retchless	Punit Sthankiya	Dave Ellis	Rob Ainsley			
2015–16	Rob Retchless	Connor Duhaime	Dave Ellis	Punit Sthankiya	Rob Ainsley		
2016–17	Rob Retchless	Alex Champ	Scott Clinton	Justin Sim			
2017–18	Rob Retchless	Alex Champ	Terry Arnold	Scott Clinton			2018 Ontario Tankard (9th)
2018–19	Rob Retchless	Alex Champ	Terry Arnold	Scott Clinton			2019 Ontario Tankard (8th)
England
2019–20	Rob Retchless	Greg Dunn	Jonathan Havercroft	James Burman	Ian Gasson	Andy Broder	English Men's Curling Championship (silver)
2022–23	Rob Retchless	Jotham Sugden	Jonathan Havercroft	Harry Pinnell		David Ramsay	EngMCC 2023 (gold)
2023–24	Rob Retchless	Jotham Sugden	Scott Gibson	Jonathan Havercroft	Felix Price	David Ramsay	ECC B 2023 (gold) , EngMCC 2024 (gold)
2024–25	Rob Retchless	Jotham Sugden	Scott Gibson	Jonathan Havercroft	Colin Mouat	David Ramsay	ECC 2024 (10th)

=== Mixed doubles ===
Rob Retchless and his wife, Ashley Waye, have been mixed doubles partners since 2012, winning Ontario Provincial Silver in 2013.

=== Junior Men's ===
Season	Skip	Third	Second	Lead	Alternate	Coach	Events
1998-99	Rob Retchless	Daniel Camber	Josh Bronson	Ray Mathers		Louise Retchless	Quebec Winter Games (9th)
1999-00	Rob Retchless	Josh Bronson	Daniel Camber	Jamie Retchless		Andrew Retchless	
2000-01	Rob Retchless	Josh Bronson	Daniel Camber	Jamie Retchless		Andrew Retchless	
2001-02	Rob Retchless	Josh Bronson	Daniel Camber	Jamie Retchless		Andrew Retchless	Quebec Junior Men's Provincials (Silver)
2002-03	Rob Retchless	Josh Bronson	Daniel Camber	Jamie Retchless		Andrew Retchless	
2003-04	Rob Retchless	Jamie Retchless	Daniel Camber	Josh Bronson		Andrew Retchless	Quebec Junior Men's Provincials (Silver)
2004-05	Rob Retchless	Jamie Retchless	Daniel Camber	David Leroux		Andrew Retchless	Quebec Junior Men's Provincials (Bronze)
