= Newfoundland and Labrador Women's Curling Championship =

- Established: 1961
- 2026 host city: St. John's, Newfoundland and Labrador
- 2026 arena: RE/MAX Centre
- 2026 champion: Mackenzie Mitchell

Current edition
- 2026 Newfoundland and Labrador Women's Curling Championship

The Newfoundland and Labrador Women's Curling Championship, formerly the Newfoundland and Labrador Scotties Tournament of Hearts is the Newfoundland and Labrador provincial women's curling tournament. The tournament is run by the Newfoundland and Labrador Curling Association. The winning team represents Newfoundland and Labrador at the Scotties Tournament of Hearts.

== Past winners ==
Year	Team	Curling club
2026	Mackenzie Mitchell, Jessica Wiseman, Kristina Adams, Stacie Curtis	St. John's Curling Club
2025	Brooke Godsland, Erin Porter, Sarah McNeil Lamswood, Camille Burt	St. John's Curling Club
2024	Stacie Curtis, Erica Curtis, Julie Hynes, Camille Burt	St. John's Curling Club
2023	Stacie Curtis, Erica Curtis, Julie Hynes, Camille Burt	St. John's Curling Club
2022	Cancelled due to the COVID-19 pandemic in Newfoundland and Labrador. Team Hill (Sarah Hill, Kelli Sharpe, Beth Hamilton, Adrienne Mercer) represented province at Scotties.	
2021	Sarah Hill, Beth Hamilton, Lauren Barron, Adrienne Mercer	St. John's Curling Club
2020	Erica Curtis, Erin Porter, Julie Devereaux, Beth Hamilton	St. John's Curling Club
2019	Kelli Sharpe, Stephanie Guzzwell, Beth Hamilton, Michelle Jewer	St. John's Curling Club
2018	Stacie Curtis, Erin Porter, Julie Devereaux, Erica Trickett	St. John's Curling Club
2017	Stacie Curtis, Erin Porter, Julie Devereaux, Erica Trickett	St. John's Curling Club
2016	Stacie Curtis, Erin Porter, Julie Devereaux, Carrie Vautour	St. John's Curling Club
2015	Heather Strong, Stephanie Korab, Jessica Cunningham, Kathryn Cooper	Bally Haly Golf & Curling Club
2014	Heather Strong, Laura Strong, Jessica Cunningham, Kathryn Cooper	Bally Haly Golf & Curling Club
2013	Stacie Devereaux, Erin Porter, Lauren Wasylkiw, Heather Martin	Bally Haly Golf & Curling Club
2012	Heather Strong, Laura Strong, Jenn Cunningham, Stephanie Korab	Bally Haly Golf & Curling Club
2011	Stacie Devereaux, Stephanie Guzzwell, Sarah Paul, Heather Martin	Bally Haly Golf & Curling Club
2010	Shelley Nichols, Steph LeDrew, Rhonda Rogers, Collette Lemon	St. John's Curling Club
2009	Heather Strong, Cathy Cunningham, Laura Strong, Peg Ross	St. John's Curling Club
2008	Heather Strong, Cathy Cunningham, Laura Strong, Peg Ross	St. John's Curling Club
2007	Heather Strong, Shelley Nichols, Laura Strong, Susan O'Leary	St. John's Curling Club
2006	Heather Strong, Shelley Nichols, Laura Strong, Susan O'Leary	St. John's Curling Club
2005	Heather Strong, Laura Strong, Beth Hamilton, Susan O'Leary	St. John's Curling Club
2004	Cathy Cunningham, Peg Ross, Kathy Kerr, Heather Martin	St. John's Curling Club
2003	Cathy Cunningham, Peg Ross, Kathy Kerr, Heather Martin	St. John's Curling Club
2002	Cathy Cunningham, Peg Ross, Kathy Kerr, Heather Martin	St. John's Curling Club
2001	Heather Strong, Laura Strong, Susan O'Leary, Michele Baker	St. John's Curling Club
2000	Heather Strong, Kelli Sharpe, Susan Wright, Michele Renouf	St. John's Curling Club
1999	Heather Strong, Kelli Sharpe, Susan Wright, Michele Renouf	St. John's Curling Club
1998	Heather Strong, Kelli Sharpe, Michele Renouf, Karen Thomas	St. John's Curling Club
1997	Laura Phillips, Cathy Cunningham, Kathy Kerr, Heather Martin	St. John's Curling Club
1996	Laura Phillips, Cathy Cunningham, Kathy Kerr, Heather Martin	St. John's Curling Club
1995	Laura Phillips, Cathy Cunningham, Kathy Kerr, Heather Martin	St. John's Curling Club
1994	Laura Phillips, Cathy Cunningham, Kathy Kerr, Heather Martin	St. John's Curling Club
1993	Maria Thomas, Cathy Cunningham, Kathy Kerr, Cathy Brophy	St. John's Curling Club
1992	Sue Anne Bartlett, Marcie Brown, Helen Nichols, Kathy Combden	Carol Curling Club
1991	Cathy Cunningham, Maria Thomas, Kathryn O'Driscoll, Susan Wright	St. John's Curling Club
1990	Sue Anne Bartlett, Patricia Dwyer, Debra Porter, Wendy Chaulk	Carol Curling Club
1989	Laura Phillips, Diane Ryan, Sandra Sparrow, Karen Thomas	St. John's Curling Club
1988	Maria Thomas, Cathy Cunningham, Peg Ross, Cathy Efford	St. John's Curling Club
1987	Cindy Crocker, Andrea Bowering, Gail Burry, Kathryn O'Driscoll	St. John's Curling Club
1986	Sue Anne Bartlett, Patricia Dwyer, Joyce Narduzzi, Debra Porter	Carol Curling Club
1985	Sue Anne Bartlett, Patricia Dwyer, Margaret Knickle, Debra Herbert	Carol Curling Club
1984	Catharine Barker, Anita Kelly, Elizabeth James, Lillian Howse	Grand Falls Curling Club
1983	Ruby Crocker, Rene Crocker, Barbara Pinsent, Sandra Brawley	Carol Curling Club
1982	Lori Quinn, Diane Ryan, Mary Lou Wall, Karen McIntee	Corner Brook Curling Club
1981	Sue Anne Bartlett, Patricia Dwyer, Joyce Narduzzi, Jo Ann Bepperling	Carol Curling Club
1980	Sue Anne Bartlett, Patricia Dwyer, Beverly Whitten, Mavis Pike	Carol Curling Club
1979	Sue Anne Bartlett, Patricia Dwyer, Joyce Narduzzi, Mavis Pike	Carol Curling Club
1978	Sue Anne Bartlett, Patricia Dwyer, Joyce Butt, Mavis Pike	Carol Curling Club
1977	Karen Cole, Jean Burden, Shirley Burgess, Frances Burges	St. John's Curling Club
1976	Sue Anne Bartlett, Patricia Dwyer, Frances Hiscock, Mavis Pike	Carol Curling Club
1975	Gail Hiscock, Elsie May, Ruby Henry, Ruth Carter	Bally Haly Golf & Curling Club
1974	Sue Anne Bartlett, Ann Bright, Frances Hiscock, Mavis Pike	Carol Curling Club
1973	Ann Bowering, Joan Pope, Jean Burden, Chris Cathcart	St. John's Curling Club
1972	Sue Anne Bartlett, Ann Bright, Frances Hiscock, Mavis Pike	Carol Curling Club
1971	Sue Anne Bartlett, Ann Bright, Frances Hiscock, Mavis Pike	Carol Curling Club
1970	Violet Pike, Gladys Clarke, Caroline Ball, Lillian Howse	Grand Falls Curling Club
1969	Violet Pike, Caroline Ball, Doreen Parker, Mary Rockwood	Grand Falls Curling Club
1968	Jeanette Blair, Christine Mills, Elsie May, Ruth Carter	St. John's Curling Club
1967	Violet Pike, Gladys Clarke, Caroline Ball, Joanne Goodyear	Grand Falls Curling Club
1966	Violet Pike, Gladys Clarke, Caroline Ball, Joanne Goodyear	Grand Falls Curling Club
1965	Bobbie Fortune, Florence Stoddard, Pat Cameron, Elsie Farquhar	Goose Bay Curling Club
1964	Marjorie Rockwell, Jeanette Blair, Elsie May, Kay Knight	St. John's Curling Club
1963	Violet Pike, Margaret Ryan, Joan Baker, Ruby Tittemore	Grand Falls Curling Club
1962	Marjorie Rockwell, Olive Wylie, Mary Dunne, Margaret Elton	St. John's Curling Club
1961	Violet Pike, Margaret Ryan, Joan Baker, Ruby Tittemore	Grand Falls Curling Club
