= 2010 Newfoundland and Labrador Scotties Tournament of Hearts =

- Host city: St. John's, Newfoundland and Labrador
- Arena: ReMax Centre
- Dates: January 6–10, 2010
- Winner: Team Nichols
- Curling club: ReMax Centre, St. John's
- Skip: Shelley Nichols
- Third: Steph LeDrew
- Second: Rhonda Rogers
- Lead: Colette Lemon
- Finalist: Heather Strong

The 2010 Newfoundland and Labrador Scotties Tournament of Hearts was held January 6-10 at the ReMax Centre in St. John's, Newfoundland and Labrador. The winning team, led by Shelley Nichols, represented Newfoundland and Labrador at the 2010 Scotties Tournament of Hearts in Sault Ste. Marie, Ontario.

== Teams ==
Skip	Third	Second	Lead	Club
Stacie Devereaux	Stephanie Guzzwell	Sarah Paul	Heather Martin	Bally Haly Golf and Curling Club, St. John's
Susan Hannan	Amy MacIntyre	Paula French	Lacey Seamone	ReMax Centre, St. John's
Cindy Miller	Beth Hamilton	Noelle Thomas	Adrienne Mercer	Bally Haly Golf and Curling Club, St. John's
Shelley Nichols	Steph LeDrew	Rhonda Rogers	Colette Lemon	ReMax Centre, St. John's
Laura Phillips	Dianne Ryan	Marian Dawe	Jeanette Hodder	ReMax Centre, St. John's
Heather Strong	Cathy Cunningham	Laura Strong	Peg Goss	ReMax Centre, St. John's

== Standings ==
Skip (Club)	W	L	PF	PA	Ends Won	Ends Lost	Blank Ends	Stolen Ends
Shelley Nichols (Bally Haly)	5	0	45	30	25	19	1	7
Stacie Devereaux (Bally Haly)	4	1	45	24	20	16	4	4
Heather Strong (ReMax)	3	2	39	27	22	16	3	7
Laura Phillips (ReMax)	2	3	34	36	20	21	4	4
Cindy Miller (Bally Haly)	1	4	17	38	14	22	6	4
Susan Hannan (ReMax)	0	5	19	44	15	22	4	6

== Results ==
=== Draw 1 ===
January 6, 1:30 PM

Sheet 1	1	2	3	4	5	6	7	8	9	10	Final
Phillips	0	1	0	2	0	2	0	1	0	X	6
Strong	1	0	3	0	2	0	1	0	3	X	10

Sheet 2	1	2	3	4	5	6	7	8	9	10	Final
Nichols	3	0	2	0	0	1	3	2	X	X	11
Hannan	0	2	0	1	1	0	0	0	X	X	4

Sheet 3	1	2	3	4	5	6	7	8	9	10	Final
Devereaux	0	3	0	1	3	0	5	X	X	X	12
Miller	0	0	1	0	0	1	0	X	X	X	3

=== Draw 2 ===
January 6, 7:30 PM

Sheet 1	1	2	3	4	5	6	7	8	9	10	Final
Phillips	0	2	0	0	2	0	2	0	3	0	9
Nichols	3	0	2	2	0	1	0	1	0	1	10

Sheet 2	1	2	3	4	5	6	7	8	9	10	Final
Hannan	0	1	1	0	2	0	0	0	0	0	4
Miller	0	0	0	1	0	1	1	1	1	2	7

Sheet 3	1	2	3	4	5	6	7	8	9	10	Final
Strong	0	1	0	3	0	0	0	2	0	X	6
Devereaux	2	0	2	0	0	2	0	0	2	X	8

=== Draw 3 ===
January 7, 9:30 AM

Sheet 1	1	2	3	4	5	6	7	8	9	10	Final
Strong	0	0	2	1	0	3	1	1	X	X	8
Miller	0	1	0	0	1	0	0	0	X	X	2

Sheet 2	1	2	3	4	5	6	7	8	9	10	Final
Nichols	1	2	0	0	2	0	1	0	2	X	8
Devereaux	0	0	2	1	0	2	0	1	0	X	6

Sheet 3	1	2	3	4	5	6	7	8	9	10	Final
Phillips	2	0	0	0	0	1	1	0	0	4	8
Hannan	0	0	0	1	1	0	0	2	2	0	6

=== Draw 4 ===
January 7, 3:30 PM

Sheet 1	1	2	3	4	5	6	7	8	9	10	Final
Strong	2	0	0	3	1	2	X	X	X	X	8
Hannan	0	1	1	0	0	0	X	X	X	X	2

Sheet 2	1	2	3	4	5	6	7	8	9	10	Final
Nichols	0	2	0	0	1	1	2	0	1	X	7
Miller	2	0	0	1	0	0	0	1	0	X	4

Sheet 3	1	2	3	4	5	6	7	8	9	10	Final
Phillips	2	0	0	0	1	0	1	0	X	X	4
Devereaux	0	1	1	2	0	3	0	2	X	X	9

=== Draw 5 ===
January 8, 9:30 AM

Sheet 1	1	2	3	4	5	6	7	8	9	10	Final
Hannan	0	0	1	0	1	1	0	X	X	X	3
Devereaux	0	2	0	4	0	0	4	X	X	X	10

Sheet 2	1	2	3	4	5	6	7	8	9	10	Final
Phillips	1	0	0	1	1	2	0	2	X	X	7
Miller	0	0	0	0	0	0	1	0	X	X	1

Sheet 3	1	2	3	4	5	6	7	8	9	10	Final
Strong	0	0	1	2	0	1	0	2	1	X	7
Nichols	2	2	0	0	2	0	3	0	0	X	9

== Playoffs ==
Semifinal			Final 1			Final 2
						1	Shelley Nichols	9
2	Stacie Devereaux	3				3	Heather Strong	8
3	Heather Strong	10	1	Shelley Nichols	3
			3	Heather Strong	6

=== Semifinal ===
January 8, 7:30 PM

Team	1	2	3	4	5	6	7	8	9	10	Final
Stacie Devereaux	0	0	2	0	0	1	0	0	0	X	3
Heather Strong	1	1	0	2	1	0	2	1	2	X	10

=== Final ===
January 9, 1:00 PM

Team	1	2	3	4	5	6	7	8	9	10	Final
Shelley Nichols	0	1	0	1	0	0	0	1	0	X	3
Heather Strong	0	0	1	0	1	2	1	0	1	X	6

=== Final 2 ===
January 9, 7:30 PM

Team	1	2	3	4	5	6	7	8	9	10	11	Final
Shelley Nichols**	0	1	2	0	3	0	0	1	0	1	1	9
Heather Strong	1	0	0	2	0	2	1	0	2	0	0	8

** Nichols must be beaten twice
