= 2014 Newfoundland and Labrador Scotties Tournament of Hearts =

- Host city: St. John's, Newfoundland and Labrador
- Arena: RE/MAX Centre
- Dates: January 8–12
- Winner: Heather Strong
- Curling club: Bally Haly G&CC, St. John's
- Skip: Heather Strong
- Third: Laura Strong
- Second: Jessica Cunningham
- Lead: Kathryn Cooper
- Finalist: Shelley Nichols

The 2014 Newfoundland and Labrador Scotties Tournament of Hearts, the provincial women's curling championship for Newfoundland and Labrador, was held from January 8 to 12 at the RE/MAX Centre in St. John's, Newfoundland and Labrador. The winning Heather Strong team represented Newfoundland and Labrador at the 2014 Scotties Tournament of Hearts in Montreal.

== Teams ==
Skip	Third	Second	Lead	Club
Stacie Devereaux	Erin Porter	Marie Christianson	Noelle Thomas-Kennell	Bally Haly Golf & Curling Club, St. John's
Stephanie Guzzwell	Sarah Paul	Cindy Miller	Carrie Vautour	St. John's Curling Club, St. John's
Beth Hamilton	Jillian Waite	Lauren Wasylkiw	Adrienne Mercer	Bally Haly Golf & Curling Club, St. John's
Shelley Nichols	Michelle Jewer	Kelli Turpin	Rhonda Whalen	St. John's Curling Club, St. John's
Heather Strong	Laura Strong	Jessica Cunningham	Kathryn Cooper	Bally Haly Golf & Curling Club, St. John's

== Round-robin standings ==
Final round-robin standings

Key
Teams to Final

Skip (Club)	W	L
Heather Strong (Bally Haly)	3	1
Shelley Nichols (St. John's)	3	1
Beth Hamilton (Bally Haly)	2	2
Stacie Devereaux (Bally Haly)	1	3
Stephanie Guzzwell (St. John's)	1	3

== Round-robin results ==
=== Draw 1 ===
Wednesday, January 8, 5:00 pm

Team	1	2	3	4	5	6	7	8	9	10	Final
Heather Strong	0	3	0	0	2	0	2	3	X	X	10
Beth Hamilton	0	0	1	1	0	0	0	0	X	X	2

Team	1	2	3	4	5	6	7	8	9	10	Final
Stacie Devereaux	0	0	2	0	0	1	0	0	2	X	5
Shelley Nichols	0	2	0	2	1	0	3	1	0	X	9

=== Draw 2 ===
Thursday, January 9, 9:00 am

Team	1	2	3	4	5	6	7	8	9	10	Final
Heather Strong	0	0	0	1	2	4	0	0	1	X	8
Stephanie Guzzwell	1	1	0	0	0	0	1	1	0	X	4

Team	1	2	3	4	5	6	7	8	9	10	11	Final
Stacie Devereaux	0	1	0	0	4	0	1	0	0	0	0	6
Beth Hamilton	0	0	1	1	0	1	0	0	2	1	1	7

=== Draw 3 ===
Thursday, January 9, 2:30 pm

Team	1	2	3	4	5	6	7	8	9	10	Final
Stacie Devereaux	1	0	0	0	1	0	1	0	1	1	5
Stephanie Guzzwell	0	0	2	2	0	1	0	1	0	0	6

Team	1	2	3	4	5	6	7	8	9	10	Final
Shelley Nichols	0	1	0	1	2	1	0	2	0	X	7
Beth Hamilton	1	0	1	0	0	0	1	0	2	X	5

=== Draw 4 ===
Friday, January 10, 2:00 pm

Team	1	2	3	4	5	6	7	8	9	10	Final
Stacie Devereaux	0	2	1	0	0	0	4	0	1	1	9
Heather Strong	0	0	0	1	1	2	0	3	0	0	7

Team	1	2	3	4	5	6	7	8	9	10	Final
Shelley Nichols	1	0	0	1	1	0	1	1	0	0	5
Stephanie Guzzwell	0	0	1	0	0	1	0	0	1	1	4

=== Draw 5 ===
Friday, January 10, 7:30 pm

Team	1	2	3	4	5	6	7	8	9	10	11	Final
Shelley Nichols	0	0	0	1	1	0	2	1	0	0	0	5
Heather Strong	2	0	1	0	0	1	0	0	0	1	1	6

Team	1	2	3	4	5	6	7	8	9	10	Final
Beth Hamilton	1	0	1	1	3	0	0	0	3	X	9
Stephanie Guzzwell	0	1	0	0	0	2	1	1	0	X	5

== Final ==
Saturday, January 11, 1:30 pm

Team	1	2	3	4	5	6	7	8	9	10	Final
Shelley Nichols	0	1	2	0	0	0	0	0	0	X	3
Heather Strong	1	0	0	2	0	0	1	3	3	X	10

2014 Newfoundland and Labrador Scotties Tournament of Hearts

Heather Strong
11th Newfoundland and Labrador Provincial Championship title
