= 2015 Newfoundland and Labrador Scotties Tournament of Hearts =

- Host city: St. John's, Newfoundland and Labrador
- Arena: Bally Haly Golf & Curling Club
- Dates: January 15–18
- Winner: Heather Strong
- Curling club: Bally Haly G&CC, St. John's
- Skip: Heather Strong
- Third: Stephanie Korab
- Second: Jessica Cunningham
- Lead: Kathryn Cooper
- Finalist: Stephanie Guzzwell

The 2015 Newfoundland and Labrador Scotties Tournament of Hearts, the provincial women's curling championship of Newfoundland and Labrador was held January 15–18 at the Bally Haly Golf & Curling Club in St. John's, Newfoundland and Labrador. The winning team was the Heather Strong rink from the host Bally Haly Club, and she and her team represented Newfoundland and Labrador at the 2015 Scotties Tournament of Hearts in Moose Jaw, Saskatchewan.

== Teams ==
Skip	Third	Second	Lead	Club(s)
Marie Christianson	Erin Porter	Lauren Wasylkiw	Erica Trickett	Re/Max Curling Centre, St. John's
Stacie Curtis	Carolyn Suley	Julie Devereaux	Nicole Noseworthy	Re/Max Curling Centre, St. John's
Stephanie Guzzwell	Sarah Paul	Carrie Vautour	Cindy Miller	Re/Max Curling Centre, St. John's
Heather Strong	Stephanie Korab	Jessica Cunningham	Kathryn Cooper	Bally Haly Golf & Curling Club, St. John's
Kelli Turpin	Michelle Jewer	Beth Hamilton	Rhonda Whelan	Re/Max Curling Centre, St. John's

== Round-robin standings ==
Final round-robin standings

Key
Teams to Final

Skip	W	L
Heather Strong (Bally Haly)	4	0
Stephanie Guzzwell (RE/MAX)	3	1
Marie Christianson (RE/MAX)	2	2
Kelli Turpin (RE/MAX)	1	3
Stacie Curtis (RE/MAX)	0	4

== Round-robin results ==
=== Draw 1 ===
Thursday, January 15, 8:30 pm

Team	1	2	3	4	5	6	7	8	9	10	Final
Heather Strong	0	0	2	0	1	1	0	1	3	X	8
Stephanie Guzzwell	0	1	0	1	0	0	1	0	0	X	3

Team	1	2	3	4	5	6	7	8	9	10	Final
Stacie Curtis	0	3	0	0	0	0	0	1	0	0	4
Kelli Turpin	1	0	2	0	1	0	0	0	1	2	7

=== Draw 2 ===
Friday, January 16, 3:00 pm

Team	1	2	3	4	5	6	7	8	9	10	Final
Heather Strong	0	0	0	2	0	2	0	0	2	0	6
Marie Christianson	1	0	0	0	1	0	0	2	0	1	5

Team	1	2	3	4	5	6	7	8	9	10	11	Final
Stephanie Guzzwell	1	0	0	1	0	2	0	1	0	0	1	6
Stacie Curtis	0	0	1	0	1	0	2	0	0	1	0	5

=== Draw 3 ===
Friday, January 16, 8:30 pm

Team	1	2	3	4	5	6	7	8	9	10	Final
Stacie Curtis	0	0	1	0	1	0	3	0	0	X	5
Marie Christianson	0	1	0	2	0	2	0	5	1	X	11

Team	1	2	3	4	5	6	7	8	9	10	11	Final
Stephanie Guzzwell	0	0	1	2	0	0	3	1	0	0	1	8
Kelli Turpin	0	2	0	0	0	1	0	0	3	1	0	7

=== Draw 4 ===
Saturday, January 17, 9:30 am

Team	1	2	3	4	5	6	7	8	9	10	Final
Heather Strong	2	0	0	2	0	1	1	1	2	X	9
Stacie Curtis	0	1	0	0	3	0	0	0	0	X	4

Team	1	2	3	4	5	6	7	8	9	10	Final
Marie Christianson	2	0	2	1	0	2	1	X	X	X	8
Kelli Turpin	0	1	0	0	1	0	0	X	X	X	2

=== Draw 5 ===
Saturday, January 17, 3:00 pm

Team	1	2	3	4	5	6	7	8	9	10	Final
Heather Strong	3	0	2	1	1	0	2	X	X	X	9
Kelli Turpin	0	1	0	0	0	1	0	X	X	X	2

Team	1	2	3	4	5	6	7	8	9	10	Final
Stephanie Guzzwell	1	1	1	1	0	2	0	1	1	X	8
Marie Christianson	0	0	0	0	2	0	1	0	0	X	3

== Finals ==
The final round between the top two teams at the end of the round robin followed the double knockout rule, which states that the first team in the finals to have two losses in the event would be knocked out of contention. Since Strong had no losses, Guzzwell would have had to defeat her twice in order to secure the title.

=== Game 1 ===
Sunday, January 18, 9:30 am

Team	1	2	3	4	5	6	7	8	9	10	Final
Heather Strong	2	0	0	0	0	2	0	1	3	X	8
Stephanie Guzzwell	0	0	0	0	2	0	1	0	0	X	3

2015 Newfoundland and Labrador Scotties Tournament of Hearts

Heather Strong
12th Newfoundland and Labrador Provincial Championship title
