= 2016 Newfoundland and Labrador Scotties Tournament of Hearts =

2016 championship

- Host city: St. John's, Newfoundland and Labrador
- Arena: Re/Max Centre
- Dates: January 28–30
- Winner: Stacie Curtis
- Curling club: St. John's Curling Club, St. John's
- Skip: Stacie Curtis
- Third: Erin Porter
- Second: Julie Devereaux
- Lead: Carrie Vautour

The 2016 Newfoundland and Labrador Scotties Tournament of Hearts, the women's provincial curling championship for Newfoundland and Labrador, was held from January 28 to 30 at the Re/Max Centre (the St. John's Curling Club) in St. John's, Newfoundland and Labrador. The winning Stacie Curtis team represented Newfoundland and Labrador at the 2016 Scotties Tournament of Hearts in Grande Prairie, Alberta.

== Teams ==
Teams are as follows:

Skip	Vice	Second	Lead	Club
Stacie Curtis	Erin Porter	Julie Devereaux	Carrie Vautour	St. John's Curling Club, St. John's
Shelley Hardy	Michelle Jewer	Kelli Turpin	Rhonda Whalen	St. John's Curling Club, St. John's
Heather Strong	Stephanie Guzzwell	Sarah Paul	Kathryn Cooper	St. John's Curling Club, St. John's

== Round-robin standings ==
Skip	W	L
Curtis	4	0
Hardy	1	2
Strong	0	3

No playoff was necessary, as Team Curtis went through the round robin undefeated.

== Round-robin results ==
=== January 28 ===
Draw 1

- Curtis 7-5 Strong

Draw 2

- Curtis 8-6 Hardy

=== January 29 ===
Draw 3

- Hardy 10-3 Strong

Draw 4

- Curtis 7-4 Strong

=== January 30 ===
Draw 5

- Curtis 7-1 Hardy

Draw 6

- Hardy vs. Strong (not played)

2016 Newfoundland and Labrador Scotties Tournament of Hearts

Stacie Curtis
3rd Newfoundland and Labrador Provincial Championship title
