= 2011 Newfoundland and Labrador Scotties Tournament of Hearts =

- Host city: St. John's, Newfoundland and Labrador
- Arena: Bally Haly G&CC
- Dates: January 19–23, 2011
- Winner: Team Devereaux
- Curling club: Bally Haly G&CC, St. John's
- Skip: Stacie Devereaux
- Third: Stephanie Guzzwell
- Second: Sarah Paul
- Lead: Heather Martin
- Finalist: Shelley Nichols

The 2011 Newfoundland and Labrador Scotties Tournament of Hearts was held January 19–23, 2011 at the Bally Haly Golf and Curling Club in St. John's, Newfoundland and Labrador, Canada. The winning team of Stacie Devereaux represented Newfoundland and Labrador at the 2011 Scotties Tournament of Hearts in Charlottetown, Prince Edward Island, where they finished the round robin with a record of 1-10.

== Teams ==
Skip	Vice	Second	Lead	Club
Stacie Devereaux	Stephanie Guzzwell	Sarah Paul	Heather Martin	Bally Haly Golf and Curling Club, St. John's
Michelle Jewer	Keli Turpin	Jill Waite	Leslie Ann Walsh	St. John's Curling Club, St. John's
Cindy Miller	Alysha Renouf	Noelle Thomas-Kennell	Stephanie Davis	Bally Haly Golf and Curling Club, St. John's
Shelley Nichols	Steph LeDrew	Rhonda Rogers	Colette Lemon	Bally Haly Golf and Curling Club, St. John's
Laura Phillips	Dianne Ryan	Marian Dawe	Jeanette Hodder	St. John's Curling Club, St. John's
Heather Strong	Laura Strong	Jenn Cunningham	Stephanie Korab	Bally Haly Golf and Curling Club, St. John's

== Standings ==
Skip (Club)	W	L	PF	PA	Ends Won	Ends Lost	Blank Ends	Stolen Ends
Stacie Devereaux (Bally Haly)	5	0	43	28	23	19	5	2
Heather Strong (Bally Haly)	4	1	32	25	20	17	8	4
Shelley Nichols (Bally Haly)	3	2	34	28	21	19	5	3
Cindy Miller (Bally Haly)	2	3	37	27	23	19	5	5
Laura Phillips (St. John's)	1	4	21	39	14	22	2	1
Michelle Jewer (St. John's)	0	5	21	42	18	24	1	2

== Results ==
- All Times Are Local (NT)

=== Draw 1 ===
January 19, 7:00 PM

Sheet 1	1	2	3	4	5	6	7	8	9	10	Final
Strong	0	0	0	0	1	0	2	0	2	0	5
Devereaux	0	0	0	1	0	2	0	3	0	1	7

Sheet 2	1	2	3	4	5	6	7	8	9	10	Final
Miller	0	1	1	0	2	0	0	2	2	X	8
Jewer	1	0	0	1	0	1	0	0	0	X	3

Sheet 3	1	2	3	4	5	6	7	8	9	10	Final
Phillips	0	1	1	0	0	1	0	0	X	X	3
Nichols	0	0	0	2	1	0	4	2	X	X	9

=== Draw 2 ===
January 20, 9:00 AM

Sheet 1	1	2	3	4	5	6	7	8	9	10	Final
Strong	0	0	0	2	2	0	1	0	0	1	6
Nichols	0	1	1	0	0	1	0	2	0	0	5

Sheet 2	1	2	3	4	5	6	7	8	9	10	Final
Jewer	0	1	0	2	0	2	0	1	0	X	6
Phillips	1	0	3	0	3	0	1	0	2	X	10

Sheet 3	1	2	3	4	5	6	7	8	9	10	Final
Miller	2	0	1	0	0	3	1	0	1	0	8
Devereaux	0	1	0	2	0	0	0	5	0	1	9

=== Draw 3 ===
January 20, 7:00 PM

Sheet 1	1	2	3	4	5	6	7	8	9	10	Final
Miller	0	2	1	3	2	1	X	X	X	X	9
Phillips	1	0	0	0	0	0	X	X	X	X	1

Sheet 2	1	2	3	4	5	6	7	8	9	10	Final
Jewer	0	1	0	1	0	1	1	0	1	X	5
Strong	2	0	1	0	1	0	0	3	0	X	7

Sheet 3	1	2	3	4	5	6	7	8	9	10	Final
Devereaux	0	0	2	0	3	0	1	0	4	X	10
Nichols	0	1	0	1	0	1	0	2	0	X	5

=== Draw 4 ===
January 21, 1:00 PM

Sheet 1	1	2	3	4	5	6	7	8	9	10	Final
Jewer	0	0	2	1	0	0	0	1	0	X	4
Devereaux	1	1	0	0	3	1	1	0	2	X	9

Sheet 2	1	2	3	4	5	6	7	8	9	10	11	Final
Miller	0	1	0	1	0	0	2	1	0	1	0	6
Nichols	2	0	1	0	0	1	0	0	2	0	1	7

Sheet 3	1	2	3	4	5	6	7	8	9	10	Final
Strong	0	0	2	0	1	3	1	X	X	X	7
Phillips	1	0	0	1	0	0	0	X	X	X	2

=== Draw 5 ===
January 21, 7:00PM

Sheet 1	1	2	3	4	5	6	7	8	9	10	Final
Devereaux	0	2	0	1	0	2	0	1	0	2	8
Phillips	1	0	1	0	1	0	2	0	2	0	7

Sheet 2	1	2	3	4	5	6	7	8	9	10	Final
Miller	0	0	0	2	0	0	2	0	2	0	6
Strong	0	2	0	0	2	1	0	1	0	1	7

Sheet 3	1	2	3	4	5	6	7	8	9	10	Final
Jewer	0	1	0	1	0	1	0	X	X	X	3
Nichols	1	0	2	0	2	0	3	X	X	X	8

== Playoffs ==
SemiFinal			Final 1			Final 2
						1	Devereaux
2	Strong	5				1	Devereaux
3	Nichols	7	1	Devereaux	9
			3	Nichols	8

=== Semifinal ===
January 22, 12:00 PM

Sheet 2	1	2	3	4	5	6	7	8	9	10	Final
Strong	0	0	1	0	2	0	1	1	0	0	5
Nichols	0	0	0	1	0	2	0	0	3	1	7

=== Final 1 ===
January 23, 9:00 AM

Sheet 2	1	2	3	4	5	6	7	8	9	10	Final
Devereaux	2	0	2	0	1	1	0	3	0	0	9
Nichols	0	2	0	1	0	0	1	0	2	2	8

=== Final 2 ===
January 23, 2:00 PM

Sheet 2	1	2	3	4	5	6	7	8	9	10	Final
Devereaux**											0
Devereaux											0

**Devereaux must be beaten twice
