= 2012 Newfoundland and Labrador Scotties Tournament of Hearts =

Canadian curling competition

- Host city: St. John's, Newfoundland and Labrador.
- Arena: ReMax Centre
- Dates: January 18–22, 2012
- Winner: Team Strong
- Curling club: Bally Haly G&CC, St. John's
- Skip: Heather Strong
- Third: Laura Strong
- Second: Jessica Cunningham
- Lead: Stephanie Korab
- Finalist: Laura Phillips

The 2012 Newfoundland and Labrador Scotties Tournament of Hearts, Newfoundland and Labrador's women's provincial curling championship, was held from January 18 to 22 at the ReMax Centre in St. John's, Newfoundland and Labrador. The winning team, of Heather Strong, represented Newfoundland and Labrador at the 2012 Scotties Tournament of Hearts in Red Deer, Alberta, where they finished with a 4–7 record.

== Teams ==
Skip	Vice	Second	Lead	Club
Stacie Devereaux	Erin Porter	Alysha Renouf	Heather Martin	Bally Haly Golf and Curling Club, St. John's
Beth Hamilton	Sarah Paul	Jillian Waite	Adrienne Mercer	St. John's Curling Club, St. John's
Shelley Nichols	Michelle Jewer	Kelli Turpin	Colette Nichols	St. John's Curling Club, St. John's
Laura Phillips	Marian Templeton	Marian Dawe	Jeanette Hodder	St. John's Curling Club, St. John's
Heather Strong	Laura Strong	Jenn Cunningham	Stephanie Korab	Bally Haly Golf and Curling Club, St. John's

== Standings ==
Skip (Club)	W	L	PF	PA	Ends Won	Ends Lost	Blank Ends	Stolen Ends
Heather Strong (Bally Haly)	3	1	25	16	17	12	5	5
Laura Phillips (St. John's)	2	2	24	30	15	18	1	8
Stacie Devereaux (Bally Haly)	2	2	25	27	16	17	1	7
Shelley Nichols (St. John's)	2	2	28	23	21	15	4	7
Beth Hamilton (St. John's)	1	3	27	33	14	20	3	3

*Phillips placed second by virtue of a win over Nichols and Devereaux

== Results ==
All Times Are Local (Newfoundland Standard Time)

=== Draw 1 ===
January 18, 12:30 PM

Sheet 1	1	2	3	4	5	6	7	8	9	10	Final
Devereaux	1	0	0	0	0	0	1	0	X	X	2
Nichols	0	0	2	1	1	2	0	2	X	X	8

Sheet 2	1	2	3	4	5	6	7	8	9	10	Final
Strong	0	0	0	1	0	2	0	3	2	X	8
Hamilton	0	0	1	0	2	0	1	0	0	X	4

=== Draw 2 ===
January 18, 9:00 PM

Sheet 1	1	2	3	4	5	6	7	8	9	10	Final
Devereaux	0	0	2	0	1	0	0	1	1	X	5
Phillips	3	3	0	1	0	2	1	0	0	X	10

Sheet 2	1	2	3	4	5	6	7	8	9	10	Final
Nichols	0	0	0	1	0	0	1	0	2	0	4
Strong	0	2	0	0	0	1	0	1	0	1	5

=== Draw 3 ===
January 19, 1:30 PM

Sheet 1	1	2	3	4	5	6	7	8	9	10	Final
Devereaux	0	2	2	4	0	0	2	1	X	X	11
Hamilton	1	0	0	0	3	1	0	0	X	X	5

Sheet 2	1	2	3	4	5	6	7	8	9	10	Final
Nichols	2	0	0	0	2	0	0	1	1	1	7
Phillips	0	2	1	1	0	1	3	0	0	0	8

=== Draw 4 ===
January 19, 9:00 PM

Sheet 1	1	2	3	4	5	6	7	8	9	10	Final
Hamilton	4	0	0	0	0	0	1	3	2	X	10
Phillips	0	0	2	1	1	1	0	0	0	X	5

Sheet 2	1	2	3	4	5	6	7	8	9	10	Final
Devereaux	0	0	1	1	0	1	3	1	0	X	7
Strong	1	1	0	0	1	0	0	0	1	X	4

=== Draw 5 ===
January 20, 1:00PM

Sheet 1	1	2	3	4	5	6	7	8	9	10	Final
Strong	2	1	2	1	0	2	X	X	X	X	8
Phillips	0	0	0	0	1	0	X	X	X	X	1

Sheet 2	1	2	3	4	5	6	7	8	9	10	11	Final
Nichols	2	1	0	1	0	2	0	1	0	1	1	9
Hamilton	0	0	1	0	2	0	2	0	3	0	0	8

=== Tiebreaker ===
January 20, 7:30PM

Sheet 1	1	2	3	4	5	6	7	8	9	10	11	Final
Devereaux	0	1	0	0	1	1	0	3	0	0	1	7
Nichols	1	0	2	1	0	0	1	0	0	1	0	6

== Playoffs ==
Semifinal			Final
			1	Heather Strong	9
2	Laura Phillips	8	2	Laura Phillips	3
3	Stacie Devereaux	4

=== Semifinal ===
January 21, 1:00 PM

Sheet 2	1	2	3	4	5	6	7	8	9	10	Final
Phillips	0	2	1	1	2	0	0	0	2	X	8
Devereaux	0	0	0	0	0	1	2	1	0	X	4

=== Final ===
January 21, 7:30 PM

Sheet 2	1	2	3	4	5	6	7	8	9	10	Final
Strong	1	0	0	2	2	1	2	1	X	X	9
Philips	0	0	3	0	0	0	0	0	X	X	3

2012 Newfoundland and Labrador Scotties Tournament of Hearts

Heather Strong
Newfoundland and Labrador Provincial Championship title
