= 2013 Newfoundland and Labrador Scotties Tournament of Hearts =

- Host city: St. John's, Newfoundland and Labrador.
- Arena: Bally Haly Golf & Curling Club
- Dates: January 16–20
- Winner: Team Devereaux
- Curling club: Bally Haly G&CC, St. John's
- Skip: Stacie Devereaux
- Third: Erin Porter
- Second: Lauren Wasylkiw
- Lead: Heather Martin
- Coach: Craig Withycombe
- Finalist: Heather Strong

The 2013 Newfoundland and Labrador Scotties Tournament of Hearts women's provincial curling championship, was held January 16–20 at the Bally Haly Golf & Curling Club in St. John's, Newfoundland and Labrador. The winning Stacie Devereaux rink would go on to represent Newfoundland and Labrador at the 2013 Scotties Tournament of Hearts in Kingston, Ontario.

== Teams ==
Skip	Vice	Second	Lead	Club
Heather Strong	Laura Strong	Erica Trickett	Stephanie Korab	Bally Haly Golf & Curling Club, St. John's
Shelley Nichols	Michelle Jewer	Kelli Turpin	Rhonda Rogers	St. John's Curling Club, St. John's
Beth Hamilton	Sarah Paul	Jillian Waite	Adrienne Mercer	Bally Haly Golf & Curling Club, St. John's
Stacie Devereaux	Erin Porter	Lauren Wasylkiw	Heather Martin	Bally Haly Golf & Curling Club, St. John's
Laura Phillips	Wendy Chaulk	Marian Dawe	Jeannette Hodder	St. John's Curling Club, St. John's

== Standings ==
Skip (Club)	W	L	PF	PA	Ends Won	Ends Lost	Blank Ends
Stacie Devereaux (Bally Haly)	4	0	32	20	18	17	5
Heather Strong (Bally Haly)	3	1	31	22	19	14	4
Laura Phillips (St. John's)	1	3	22	36	15	17	3
Shelley Nichols (St. John's)	1	3	26	28	16	17	7
Beth Hamilton (Bally Haly)	1	3	23	28	16	19	7

== Results ==
All draw times listed in Newfoundland Standard Time Zone (UTC−03:30).

=== Draw 1 ===
January 16, 7:30 PM

Team	1	2	3	4	5	6	7	8	9	10	Final
Phillips	0	2	0	0	0	0	4	0	0	X	6
Nichols	4	0	2	1	0	1	0	2	1	X	11

Team	1	2	3	4	5	6	7	8	9	10	11	Final
Devereaux	0	0	1	0	2	0	0	1	0	2	1	7
Hamilton	0	0	0	2	0	1	2	0	1	0	0	6

=== Draw 2 ===
January 17, 2:00 PM

Team	1	2	3	4	5	6	7	8	9	10	Final
Phillips	0	0	1	0	2	0	1	0	X	X	4
Strong	1	2	0	1	0	4	0	0	X	X	8

Team	1	2	3	4	5	6	7	8	9	10	11	Final
Devereaux	0	0	0	0	2	0	0	1	0	2	1	6
Nichols	0	0	2	1	0	0	1	0	1	0	0	5

=== Draw 3 ===
January 17, 7:30 PM

Team	1	2	3	4	5	6	7	8	9	10	Final
Devereaux	0	2	1	0	1	0	0	2	0	3	9
Strong	1	0	0	1	0	1	1	0	1	0	5

Team	1	2	3	4	5	6	7	8	9	10	11	Final
Hamilton	0	0	1	1	1	0	0	1	1	0	1	6
Nichols	3	0	0	0	0	1	0	0	0	1	0	5

=== Draw 4 ===
January 18, 2:30 PM

Team	1	2	3	4	5	6	7	8	9	10	Final
Devereaux	0	0	3	0	1	0	4	2	X	X	10
Phillips	1	1	0	1	0	1	0	0	X	X	4

Team	1	2	3	4	5	6	7	8	9	10	Final
Hamilton	1	0	0	2	0	0	0	1	0	0	4
Strong	0	0	3	0	1	1	1	0	2	0	8

=== Draw 5 ===
January 18, 7:30PM

Team	1	2	3	4	5	6	7	8	9	10	Final
Hamilton	0	0	2	2	0	0	0	0	3	0	7
Phillips	0	1	0	0	2	2	1	1	0	1	8

Team	1	2	3	4	5	6	7	8	9	10	Final
Nicholls	0	1	0	1	0	0	0	3	0	X	5
Strong	2	0	2	0	2	0	2	0	2	X	10

== Playoffs ==
Due to Devereaux being undefeated, she must be beaten twice by Strong in order for Strong to win.

Final 1			Final 2
			1	Stacie Devereaux	8
1	Stacie Devereaux	5	2	Heather Strong	7
2	Heather Strong	10

=== Final 1 ===
January 19, 14:00

Team	1	2	3	4	5	6	7	8	9	10	Final
Devereaux	1	1	0	2	0	0	0	1	0	X	5
Strong	0	0	2	0	2	3	1	0	2	X	10

=== Final 2 ===
January 19, 19:30

Team	1	2	3	4	5	6	7	8	9	10	Final
Devereaux	0	3	0	0	1	1	0	0	3	0	8
Strong	1	0	2	0	0	0	0	3	0	1	7

2013 Newfoundland and Labrador Scotties Tournament of Hearts

Stacie Devereaux
2nd Newfoundland and Labrador Provincial Championship title
