= 2003 Scott Tournament of Hearts =

- Host city: Kitchener, Ontario
- Arena: Kitchener Memorial Auditorium
- Dates: February 15–23
- Attendance: 67,209
- Winner: Canada
- Curling club: Mayflower CC, Halifax
- Skip: Colleen Jones
- Third: Kim Kelly
- Second: Mary-Anne Waye
- Lead: Nancy Delahunt
- Alternate: Laine Peters
- Coach: Ken Bagnell
- Finalist: Newfoundland and Labrador (Cathy Cunningham)

The 2003 Scott Tournament of Hearts was held at the Kitchener Memorial Auditorium in Kitchener, Ontario from February 15 to 23. The Colleen Jones rink returned as Team Canada, going on to win their third straight Hearts, then representing Canada at the 2003 World Women's Curling Championship where they won silver.

== Teams ==
The teams were listed as follows:

Team Canada	Alberta	British Columbia
Mayflower CC, Halifax Skip: Colleen Jones; Third: Kim Kelly (Note: For Draw 18, Team Canada alternate Laine Peters threw second stones, second Mary-Anne Waye threw third stones, while third Kim Kelly sat out.); Second: Mary-Anne Waye (Note: Team Canada alternate Laine Peters threw second stones in Draw 8.); Lead: Nancy Delahunt; Alternate: Laine Peters	Avonair CC, Edmonton Skip: Deb Santos; Third: Jackie-Rae Greening; Second: Brenda Bohmer; Lead: Kate Horne; Alternate: Shannon Orsini	Golden Ears WC, Maple Ridge Skip: Toni Fister; Third: Teri Fister; Second: Denise Byers; Lead: Angela Strachan; Alternate: Jacquie Armstrong
Manitoba	New Brunswick	Newfoundland and Labrador
Fort Rouge CC, Winnipeg Skip: Barb Spencer; Third: Darcy Robertson; Second: Barb Enright; Lead: Faye Unrau; Alternate: Tanya Craig	Thistle St. Andrews CC, Saint John Skip: Heidi Hanlon; Third: Stacey Lacey (Note: Team New Brunswick alternate Sheri Stewart threw third stones in Draws 15 and 16.); Second: Jennifer Gogan; Lead: Judy Blanchard; Alternate: Sheri Stewart	St. John's CC, St. John's Skip: Cathy Cunningham; Third: Peg Goss; Second: Kathy Kerr; Lead: Heather Martin (Note: Team Newfoundland and Labrador alternate Anna-Mae Holden threw lead stones in Draws 8 and 9.); Alternate: Anna-Mae Holden
Nova Scotia	Ontario	Prince Edward Island
Mayflower CC, Halifax Skip: Nancy McConnery; Third: Colleen Pinkney; Second: Shelley MacNutt; Lead: Wendy Currie; Alternate: Karen Hennigar	Galt CC, Cambridge Skip: Anne Dunn; Third: Lindy Marchuk; Second: Gloria Campbell; Lead: Fran Todd; Alternate: Cheryl McPherson	Charlottetown CC, Charlottetown Skip: Suzanne Gaudet; Third: Rebecca Jean MacPhee; Second: Robyn MacPhee; Lead: Susan McInnis (Note: Team Prince Edward Island alternate Donna Butler threw lead stones in the last two ends of Draw 6.); Alternate: Donna Butler
Quebec	Saskatchewan	Northwest Territories/Yukon
CC Riverbend, Alma Skip: Nathalie Gagnon; Third: Karine Marchand; Second: Joëlle Belley; Lead: Julie Blackburn; Alternate: Ginette Simard	Caledonian CC, Regina Skip: Jan Betker; Third: Sherry Linton; Second: Joan McCusker; Lead: Marcia Gudereit; Alternate: Nancy Inglis	Yellowknife CC, Yellowknife Skip: Dawn Moses; Third: Sharon Cormier; Second: Tara Naugler (Note: For Draw 11, Team Northwest Territories/Yukon alternate Coralee Round threw second stones, second Tara Naugler threw lead stones, while lead Ann Lange sat out. Round would also throw second stones in Draw 13 with Naugler sitting out.); Lead: Ann Lange; Alternate: Coralee Round

== Map of teams ==
Team Canada Provincial Winners

== Round Robin standings ==
Final round robin standings

Key
Teams to Playoffs

Locale	Skip	W	L	W–L	PF	PA	EW	EL	BE	SE	S%
Prince Edward Island	Suzanne Gaudet	10	1	–	89	61	50	42	10	13	80%
Canada	Colleen Jones	8	3	–	81	60	49	41	14	10	79%
Saskatchewan	Jan Betker	7	4	–	75	59	43	47	13	9	79%
Newfoundland and Labrador	Cathy Cunningham	6	5	–	69	74	46	48	11	7	75%
New Brunswick	Heidi Hanlon	5	6	3–1	70	80	48	49	9	8	74%
Alberta	Deb Santos	5	6	2–2; 2–0	74	73	47	46	8	12	78%
Nova Scotia	Nancy McConnery	5	6	2–2; 1–1	74	79	45	51	7	6	73%
Quebec	Nathalie Gagnon	5	6	2–2; 0–2	66	75	45	50	10	10	71%
Ontario	Anne Dunn	5	6	1–3	67	66	48	47	8	14	75%
British Columbia	Toni Fister	4	7	1–0	62	75	42	50	10	9	73%
Manitoba	Barb Spencer	4	7	0–1	72	71	46	47	9	11	73%
Northwest Territories/Yukon	Dawn Moses	2	9	–	69	87	50	43	8	11	73%

== Round Robin results ==
All draw times are listed in Eastern Time (UTC−05:00).

=== Draw 1 ===
Saturday, February 15, 2:30 pm

Sheet A	1	2	3	4	5	6	7	8	9	10	11	Final
Canada (Jones) 🔨	0	2	0	0	0	3	0	2	0	0	1	8
Prince Edward Island (Gaudet)	0	0	0	0	2	0	2	0	2	1	0	7

Sheet B	1	2	3	4	5	6	7	8	9	10	Final
Saskatchewan (Betker) 🔨	1	2	0	2	1	0	1	0	1	X	8
New Brunswick (Hanlon)	0	0	1	0	0	1	0	1	0	X	3

Sheet C	1	2	3	4	5	6	7	8	9	10	Final
British Columbia (Fister)	0	0	0	1	0	1	0	0	X	X	2
Alberta (Santos) 🔨	2	1	1	0	1	0	2	1	X	X	8

Sheet D	1	2	3	4	5	6	7	8	9	10	Final
Ontario (Dunn)	0	1	2	2	1	3	0	0	1	X	10
Manitoba (Spencer) 🔨	2	0	0	0	0	0	2	1	0	X	5

=== Draw 2 ===
Saturday, February 15, 7:30 pm

Sheet A	1	2	3	4	5	6	7	8	9	10	Final
Alberta (Santos) 🔨	0	1	0	0	2	1	0	0	1	2	7
Saskatchewan (Betker)	1	0	3	0	0	0	1	1	0	0	6

Sheet B	1	2	3	4	5	6	7	8	9	10	Final
Nova Scotia (McConnery)	0	0	3	0	4	0	2	0	2	X	11
Northwest Territories/Yukon (Moses)	1	1	0	1	0	2	0	1	0	X	6

Sheet C	1	2	3	4	5	6	7	8	9	10	Final
Newfoundland and Labrador (Cunningham) 🔨	0	0	1	0	3	0	0	0	1	0	5
Quebec (Gagnon)	0	1	0	2	0	1	0	2	0	1	7

Sheet D	1	2	3	4	5	6	7	8	9	10	Final
British Columbia (Fister) 🔨	0	0	2	0	1	0	2	0	1	0	6
New Brunswick (Hanlon)	1	1	0	2	0	1	0	1	0	1	7

=== Draw 3 ===
Sunday, February 16, 9:30 am

Sheet B	1	2	3	4	5	6	7	8	9	10	11	Final
Manitoba (Spencer)	0	1	0	0	1	0	1	1	0	3	0	7
Canada (Jones)	1	0	0	2	0	2	0	0	2	0	1	8

Sheet C	1	2	3	4	5	6	7	8	9	10	Final
Ontario (Dunn) 🔨	0	0	1	0	0	0	1	0	X	X	2
Prince Edward Island (Gaudet)	0	2	0	2	1	2	0	0	X	X	7

=== Draw 4 ===
Sunday, February 16, 2:30 pm

Sheet A	1	2	3	4	5	6	7	8	9	10	Final
Northwest Territories/Yukon (Moses) 🔨	1	0	2	3	0	2	0	2	X	X	10
Newfoundland and Labrador (Cunningham)	0	3	0	0	1	0	1	0	X	X	5

Sheet B	1	2	3	4	5	6	7	8	9	10	Final
New Brunswick (Hanlon) 🔨	2	0	2	0	0	1	0	3	2	X	10
Alberta (Santos)	0	1	0	1	5	0	1	0	0	X	8

Sheet C	1	2	3	4	5	6	7	8	9	10	Final
Saskatchewan (Betker) 🔨	0	0	2	0	3	0	0	2	0	X	7
British Columbia (Fister)	0	1	0	1	0	1	0	0	1	X	4

Sheet D	1	2	3	4	5	6	7	8	9	10	11	Final
Nova Scotia (McConnery) 🔨	1	1	0	2	0	2	0	1	0	1	1	9
Quebec (Gagnon)	0	0	1	0	3	0	1	0	3	0	0	8

=== Draw 5 ===
Sunday, February 16, 7:30 pm

Sheet A	1	2	3	4	5	6	7	8	9	10	Final
Prince Edward Island (Gaudet) 🔨	2	0	2	2	0	3	0	1	X	X	10
Manitoba (Spencer)	0	2	0	0	2	0	1	0	X	X	5

Sheet B	1	2	3	4	5	6	7	8	9	10	Final
Newfoundland and Labrador (Cunningham) 🔨	1	0	0	1	0	3	0	1	0	1	7
Nova Scotia (McConnery)	0	1	0	0	2	0	1	0	2	0	6

Sheet C	1	2	3	4	5	6	7	8	9	10	Final
Quebec (Gagnon) 🔨	0	1	0	1	0	2	1	0	0	X	5
Northwest Territories/Yukon (Moses)	1	0	1	0	0	0	0	1	0	X	3

Sheet D	1	2	3	4	5	6	7	8	9	10	Final
Ontario (Dunn)	0	0	2	4	0	1	0	1	0	X	8
Canada (Jones) 🔨	1	0	0	0	2	0	1	0	2	X	6

=== Draw 6 ===
Monday, February 17, 9:30 am

Sheet A	1	2	3	4	5	6	7	8	9	10	Final
Ontario (Dunn) 🔨	1	0	2	0	2	0	0	1	1	X	7
British Columbia (Fister)	0	1	0	1	0	1	0	0	0	X	3

Sheet B	1	2	3	4	5	6	7	8	9	10	Final
Manitoba (Spencer) 🔨	1	0	1	1	0	0	3	0	1	1	8
Saskatchewan (Betker)	0	0	0	0	2	0	0	2	0	0	4

Sheet C	1	2	3	4	5	6	7	8	9	10	Final
Canada (Jones) 🔨	0	1	0	0	0	5	0	3	X	X	9
Alberta (Santos)	0	0	1	1	0	0	2	0	X	X	4

Sheet D	1	2	3	4	5	6	7	8	9	10	Final
Prince Edward Island (Gaudet) 🔨	2	0	0	0	2	0	4	1	0	X	9
New Brunswick (Hanlon)	0	2	1	0	0	1	0	0	2	X	6

=== Draw 7 ===
Monday, February 17, 2:30 pm

Sheet A	1	2	3	4	5	6	7	8	9	10	Final
Saskatchewan (Betker) 🔨	1	0	0	4	0	0	2	1	X	X	8
Quebec (Gagnon)	0	0	2	0	0	1	0	0	X	X	3

Sheet B	1	2	3	4	5	6	7	8	9	10	Final
British Columbia (Fister) 🔨	0	6	1	0	0	0	0	2	0	1	10
Northwest Territories/Yukon (Moses)	0	0	0	2	3	1	1	0	1	0	8

Sheet C	1	2	3	4	5	6	7	8	9	10	Final
New Brunswick (Hanlon) 🔨	1	1	0	1	0	1	0	3	0	0	7
Newfoundland and Labrador (Cunningham)	0	0	2	0	1	0	3	0	0	2	8

Sheet D	1	2	3	4	5	6	7	8	9	10	Final
Alberta (Santos) 🔨	1	0	0	1	2	0	1	0	4	X	9
Nova Scotia (McConnery)	0	0	1	0	0	1	0	3	0	X	5

=== Draw 8 ===
Monday, February 17, 7:30 pm

Sheet A	1	2	3	4	5	6	7	8	9	10	Final
Nova Scotia (McConnery) 🔨	0	2	0	3	0	2	0	0	1	X	8
Canada (Jones)	0	0	1	0	1	0	1	1	0	X	4

Sheet B	1	2	3	4	5	6	7	8	9	10	Final
Newfoundland and Labrador (Cunningham) 🔨	1	0	1	0	0	2	0	1	0	X	5
Prince Edward Island (Gaudet)	0	1	0	4	0	0	2	0	3	X	10

Sheet C	1	2	3	4	5	6	7	8	9	10	Final
Northwest Territories/Yukon (Moses) 🔨	2	0	1	0	1	1	0	2	1	1	9
Ontario (Dunn)	0	3	0	1	0	0	2	0	0	0	6

Sheet D	1	2	3	4	5	6	7	8	9	10	Final
Quebec (Gagnon) 🔨	2	0	0	0	3	2	0	1	0	1	9
Manitoba (Spencer)	0	1	1	1	0	0	2	0	1	0	6

=== Draw 9 ===
Tuesday, February 18, 9:30 am

Sheet A	1	2	3	4	5	6	7	8	9	10	11	Final
Northwest Territories/Yukon (Moses) 🔨	0	1	0	1	0	1	0	0	1	2	0	6
Prince Edward Island (Gaudet)	1	0	1	0	2	0	0	2	0	0	1	7

Sheet B	1	2	3	4	5	6	7	8	9	10	Final
Quebec (Gagnon) 🔨	0	1	0	1	0	1	0	1	0	X	4
Canada (Jones)	0	0	2	0	2	0	3	0	1	X	8

Sheet C	1	2	3	4	5	6	7	8	9	10	Final
Nova Scotia (McConnery) 🔨	2	0	0	2	0	2	0	2	0	X	8
Manitoba (Spencer)	0	2	1	0	1	0	1	0	2	X	7

Sheet D	1	2	3	4	5	6	7	8	9	10	Final
Newfoundland and Labrador (Cunningham) 🔨	0	2	1	1	0	0	0	0	0	X	4
Ontario (Dunn)	1	0	0	0	1	1	1	1	1	X	6

=== Draw 10 ===
Tuesday, February 18, 2:30 pm

Sheet A	1	2	3	4	5	6	7	8	9	10	Final
Manitoba (Spencer) 🔨	0	1	0	4	3	0	1	1	X	X	10
New Brunswick (Hanlon)	0	0	2	0	0	1	0	0	X	X	3

Sheet B	1	2	3	4	5	6	7	8	9	10	Final
Ontario (Dunn) 🔨	0	0	1	1	0	2	0	0	2	1	7
Alberta (Santos)	1	1	0	0	1	0	1	0	0	0	4

Sheet C	1	2	3	4	5	6	7	8	9	10	11	Final
Prince Edward Island (Gaudet) 🔨	2	1	0	0	1	1	0	1	0	0	1	7
Saskatchewan (Betker)	0	0	2	1	0	0	2	0	0	1	0	6

Sheet D	1	2	3	4	5	6	7	8	9	10	Final
Canada (Jones) 🔨	0	1	1	0	2	1	1	1	0	X	7
British Columbia (Fister)	1	0	0	1	0	0	0	0	2	X	4

=== Draw 11 ===
Tuesday, February 18, 7:30 pm

Sheet A	1	2	3	4	5	6	7	8	9	10	11	Final
Alberta (Santos) 🔨	1	0	0	0	1	0	1	2	0	2	0	7
Newfoundland and Labrador (Cunningham)	0	2	1	1	0	1	0	0	2	0	1	8

Sheet B	1	2	3	4	5	6	7	8	9	10	Final
New Brunswick (Hanlon) 🔨	0	1	1	0	0	0	0	1	1	3	7
Nova Scotia (McConnery)	0	0	0	1	1	1	2	0	0	0	5

Sheet C	1	2	3	4	5	6	7	8	9	10	11	Final
British Columbia (Fister) 🔨	1	1	0	3	0	1	1	0	0	0	1	8
Quebec (Gagnon)	0	0	1	0	2	0	0	2	1	1	0	7

Sheet D	1	2	3	4	5	6	7	8	9	10	Final
Saskatchewan (Betker) 🔨	2	0	0	3	0	0	2	3	X	X	10
Northwest Territories/Yukon (Moses)	0	1	0	0	2	1	0	0	X	X	4

=== Draw 12 ===
Wednesday, February 19, 9:30 am

Sheet A	1	2	3	4	5	6	7	8	9	10	Final
British Columbia (Fister) 🔨	2	1	1	0	1	0	3	0	1	X	9
Nova Scotia (McConnery)	0	0	0	2	0	2	0	1	0	X	5

Sheet B	1	2	3	4	5	6	7	8	9	10	Final
Saskatchewan (Betker) 🔨	0	2	0	0	2	0	1	0	1	0	6
Newfoundland and Labrador (Cunningham)	0	0	0	1	0	1	0	2	0	1	5

Sheet C	1	2	3	4	5	6	7	8	9	10	Final
Alberta (Santos) 🔨	3	0	2	0	2	0	2	0	0	X	9
Northwest Territories/Yukon (Moses)	0	1	0	1	0	2	0	2	1	X	7

Sheet D	1	2	3	4	5	6	7	8	9	10	11	Final
New Brunswick (Hanlon) 🔨	1	0	1	0	1	0	0	2	0	1	0	6
Quebec (Gagnon)	0	3	0	0	0	0	2	0	1	0	1	7

=== Draw 13 ===
Wednesday, February 19, 2:30 pm

Sheet A	1	2	3	4	5	6	7	8	9	10	Final
Quebec (Gagnon) 🔨	1	0	1	0	0	3	0	1	0	1	7
Ontario (Dunn)	0	2	0	2	1	0	1	0	0	0	6

Sheet B	1	2	3	4	5	6	7	8	9	10	Final
Northwest Territories/Yukon (Moses) 🔨	1	0	1	0	2	0	1	0	2	X	7
Manitoba (Spencer)	0	4	0	1	0	2	0	2	0	X	9

Sheet C	1	2	3	4	5	6	7	8	9	10	Final
Newfoundland and Labrador (Cunningham) 🔨	1	0	1	0	0	2	0	0	2	0	6
Canada (Jones)	0	2	0	1	0	0	0	1	0	1	5

Sheet D	1	2	3	4	5	6	7	8	9	10	Final
Nova Scotia (McConnery) 🔨	1	0	0	1	0	1	0	0	1	X	4
Prince Edward Island (Gaudet)	0	2	2	0	2	0	0	1	0	X	7

=== Draw 14 ===
Wednesday, February 19, 7:30 pm

Sheet A	1	2	3	4	5	6	7	8	9	10	Final
Canada (Jones) 🔨	1	0	2	1	2	0	0	1	1	X	8
Saskatchewan (Betker)	0	1	0	0	0	1	1	0	0	X	3

Sheet B	1	2	3	4	5	6	7	8	9	10	Final
Prince Edward Island (Gaudet) 🔨	2	0	2	0	2	2	0	1	X	X	9
British Columbia (Fister)	0	1	0	1	0	0	1	0	X	X	3

Sheet C	1	2	3	4	5	6	7	8	9	10	11	Final
Ontario (Dunn) 🔨	1	0	0	1	0	2	0	1	0	1	0	6
New Brunswick (Hanlon)	0	0	1	0	2	0	2	0	1	0	1	7

Sheet D	1	2	3	4	5	6	7	8	9	10	Final
Manitoba (Spencer) 🔨	0	2	0	0	1	1	0	0	1	1	6
Alberta (Santos)	0	0	0	1	0	0	2	1	0	0	4

=== Draw 15 ===
Thursday, February 20, 9:30 am

Sheet A	1	2	3	4	5	6	7	8	9	10	Final
New Brunswick (Hanlon) 🔨	1	1	0	0	3	0	0	3	0	X	8
Northwest Territories/Yukon (Moses)	0	0	2	0	0	2	1	0	1	X	6

Sheet B	1	2	3	4	5	6	7	8	9	10	Final
Alberta (Santos) 🔨	0	0	1	0	2	0	4	2	X	X	9
Quebec (Gagnon)	0	1	0	1	0	2	0	0	X	X	4

Sheet C	1	2	3	4	5	6	7	8	9	10	Final
Saskatchewan (Betker) 🔨	0	2	0	0	1	0	5	0	2	X	10
Nova Scotia (McConnery)	0	0	1	1	0	2	0	2	0	X	6

Sheet D	1	2	3	4	5	6	7	8	9	10	Final
British Columbia (Fister) 🔨	0	2	0	2	0	0	0	1	0	0	5
Newfoundland and Labrador (Cunningham)	0	0	1	0	0	2	1	0	0	2	6

=== Draw 16 ===
Thursday, February 20, 2:30 pm

Sheet A	1	2	3	4	5	6	7	8	9	10	Final
Prince Edward Island (Gaudet) 🔨	2	1	0	0	1	0	3	0	2	X	9
Alberta (Santos)	0	0	1	1	0	1	0	2	0	X	5

Sheet B	1	2	3	4	5	6	7	8	9	10	Final
Canada (Jones) 🔨	1	0	2	0	1	0	2	0	0	1	7
New Brunswick (Hanlon)	0	2	0	1	0	1	0	2	0	0	6

Sheet C	1	2	3	4	5	6	7	8	9	10	Final
Manitoba (Spencer) 🔨	0	0	0	2	0	0	2	0	0	X	4
British Columbia (Fister)	1	1	0	0	0	0	0	3	3	X	8

Sheet D	1	2	3	4	5	6	7	8	9	10	Final
Ontario (Dunn) 🔨	1	0	1	0	0	1	0	1	0	0	4
Saskatchewan (Betker)	0	1	0	2	0	0	2	0	1	1	7

=== Draw 17 ===
Thursday, February 20, 7:30 pm

Sheet A	1	2	3	4	5	6	7	8	9	10	Final
Newfoundland and Labrador (Cunningham) 🔨	1	0	3	0	1	1	0	3	1	X	10
Manitoba (Spencer)	0	2	0	1	0	0	2	0	0	X	5

Sheet B	1	2	3	4	5	6	7	8	9	10	Final
Nova Scotia (McConnery) 🔨	0	2	0	1	0	2	0	2	0	X	7
Ontario (Dunn)	0	0	1	0	1	0	2	0	1	X	5

Sheet C	1	2	3	4	5	6	7	8	9	10	Final
Quebec (Gagnon) 🔨	1	1	0	0	1	0	1	0	1	X	5
Prince Edward Island (Gaudet)	0	0	2	1	0	2	0	2	0	X	7

Sheet D	1	2	3	4	5	6	7	8	9	10	Final
Northwest Territories/Yukon (Moses) 🔨	1	0	1	0	0	1	0	0	0	X	3
Canada (Jones)	0	2	0	0	1	0	0	1	3	X	7

== Playoffs ==
Page playoff system
1	Prince Edward Island	3
2	Canada	6
3	Saskatchewan	6
4	Newfoundland and Labrador	8

Semifinal
1	Prince Edward Island	5
4	Newfoundland and Labrador	6

Final
2	Canada	9
4	Newfoundland and Labrador	7

=== 3 vs. 4 ===
Friday, February 21, 2:30 pm

Sheet C	1	2	3	4	5	6	7	8	9	10	Final
Saskatchewan (Betker) 🔨	0	0	2	0	3	0	1	0	0	0	6
Newfoundland and Labrador (Cunningham)	1	0	0	2	0	1	0	1	1	2	8

Player percentages
Saskatchewan		Newfoundland and Labrador	
Marcia Gudereit	79%	Heather Martin	83%
Joan McCusker	79%	Kathy Kerr	83%
Sherry Linton	86%	Peg Goss	75%
Jan Betker	74%	Cathy Cunningham	73%
Total	79%	Total	78%

=== 1 vs. 2 ===
Friday, February 21, 7:30 pm

Sheet C	1	2	3	4	5	6	7	8	9	10	Final
Prince Edward Island (Gaudet) 🔨	1	0	1	0	0	1	0	0	0	X	3
Canada (Jones)	0	2	0	0	2	0	1	0	1	X	6

Player percentages
Prince Edward Island		Canada	
Susan McInnis	94%	Nancy Delahunt	75%
Robyn MacPhee	89%	Mary-Anne Waye	70%
Rebecca Jean MacPhee	75%	Kim Kelly	83%
Suzanne Gaudet	62%	Colleen Jones	87%
Total	81%	Total	78%

=== Semifinal ===
Saturday, February 22, 7:30 pm

Sheet C	1	2	3	4	5	6	7	8	9	10	Final
Prince Edward Island (Gaudet) 🔨	0	0	1	0	1	1	0	2	0	0	5
Newfoundland and Labrador (Cunningham)	0	2	0	1	0	0	1	0	0	2	6

Player percentages
Prince Edward Island		Newfoundland and Labrador	
Susan McInnis	94%	Heather Martin	88%
Robyn MacPhee	85%	Kathy Kerr	93%
Rebecca Jean MacPhee	75%	Peg Goss	79%
Suzanne Gaudet	75%	Cathy Cunningham	89%
Total	82%	Total	87%

=== Final ===
Sunday, February 23, 2:00 pm

Sheet C	1	2	3	4	5	6	7	8	9	10	11	Final
Canada (Jones) 🔨	1	1	3	0	0	1	0	1	0	0	2	9
Newfoundland and Labrador (Cunningham)	0	0	0	2	2	0	2	0	0	1	0	7

Player percentages
Canada		Newfoundland and Labrador	
Nancy Delahunt	76%	Heather Martin	82%
Mary-Anne Waye	76%	Kathy Kerr	81%
Kim Kelly	82%	Peg Goss	73%
Colleen Jones	70%	Cathy Cunningham	77%
Total	76%	Total	78%

== Statistics ==
=== Top 5 Player Percentages ===
Round robin only; minimum 6 games

Key
First All-Star Team
Second All-Star Team

Leads	%
(Alberta) Kate Horne	85
(Saskatchewan) Marcia Gudereit	83
(Canada) Nancy Delahunt	82
(Newfoundland and Labrador) Heather Martin	82
(Prince Edward Island) Susan McInnis	80

Seconds	%
(Prince Edward Island) Robyn MacPhee	84
(Saskatchewan) Joan McCusker	81
(Ontario) Gloria Campbell	78
(British Columbia) Denise Byers	77
(Alberta) Brenda Bohmer	76

Thirds	%
(Prince Edward Island) Rebecca Jean MacPhee	80
(Canada) Kim Kelly	79
(Saskatchewan) Sherry Linton	79
(Manitoba) Darcy Robertson	77
(Alberta) Jackie-Rae Greening	75

Skips	%
(Canada) Colleen Jones	82
(Prince Edward Island) Suzanne Gaudet	77
(Ontario) Anne Dunn	75
(Saskatchewan) Jan Betker	75
(Alberta) Deb Santos	74

== Awards ==
=== All-Star teams ===
First Team
Position	Name	Team
Skip	Colleen Jones	Canada
Third	Sherry Linton	Saskatchewan
Second	Robyn MacPhee	Prince Edward Island
Lead	Nancy Delahunt	Canada

Second Team
Position	Name	Team
Skip	Suzanne Gaudet	Prince Edward Island
Third	Rebecca Jean MacPhee	Prince Edward Island
Second	Joan McCusker	Saskatchewan
Lead	Kate Horne	Alberta

=== Marj Mitchell Sportsmanship Award ===
The Marj Mitchell Sportsmanship Award was presented to the player chosen by their fellow peers as the curler that most exemplified sportsmanship and dedication to curling during the annual Scotties Tournament of Hearts.

Name	Position	Team
Anne Dunn	Skip	Ontario

=== Sandra Schmirler Most Valuable Player Award ===
The Sandra Schmirler Most Valuable Player Award was awarded to the top player in the playoff round by members of the media in the Scotties Tournament of Hearts.

Name	Position	Team
Colleen Jones (2)	Skip	Canada

Colleen Jones became the first curler to win consecutive and multiple MVP awards. She would later be joined by Kelly Scott (2007, 2008), Jennifer Jones (2009, 2015, 2018), Chelsea Carey (2016, 2019), Rachel Homan (2014, 2017, 2024, 2025), and Kerri Einarson (2020–23) as the only curlers to win the MVP award multiple times.

=== Joan Mead Builder Award ===
The Joan Mead Builder Award recognizes a builder in the sport of curling named in the honour of the late CBC curling producer Joan Mead.

Name	Contribution(s)
Vic Rauter	TSN broadcaster

=== Ford Hot Shots ===
The Ford Hot Shots was a skills competition preceding the round robin of the tournament. Each competitor had to perform a series of shots with each shot scoring between 0 and 5 points depending on where the stone came to rest. The winner of this edition of the event would win a two-year lease on a Ford Focus ZX5.

Winner	Runner-Up	Score
(Prince Edward Island) Suzanne Gaudet	(Alberta) Brenda Bohmer	21–10

=== Shot of the Week Award ===
The Shot of the Week Award was awarded to the curler who had been determined with the most outstanding shot during the tournament as voted on by TSN commentators.

Name	Position	Team
Cathy Cunningham	Skip	Newfoundland and Labrador
