= Heather Martin =

Canadian curler

- Curler
- Born: November 10, 1963 (age 63); Halifax, Nova Scotia

Team
- Curling club: St. John's CC, St. John's, NL

Curling career
- Hearts: 10 (1991, 1994, 1995, 1996, 1997, 2002, 2003, 2004, 2011, 2013)
Medal record
Curling
Scotties Tournament of Hearts
Silver medal – second place	2003 Kitchener
Bronze medal – third place	1997 Vancouver

Heather Martin (born November 10, 1963, in Halifax, Nova Scotia) is a Canadian curler from St. John's, Newfoundland and Labrador.

== Career ==
=== 1991–2000 ===
Martin's first Scotties appearance was in 1991, where she was an alternate for Cathy Cunningham. The team would finish 2-9 in round robin play. She would return to the Scott for four consecutive years, from 1994 to 1997 playing lead for Laura Phillips. From 1994 to 1996 the team would not make the playoffs, however, at the 1997 Scott Tournament of Hearts, they would finish round robin play with a 7–4 record advancing as far as the semi-final, where they would lose to Ontario's Alison Goring.

=== 2000–2004 ===
She would return to the Scott in 2002, 2003 and 2004, this time playing for lead for Cathy Cunningham. At the 2003 Scott Tournament of Hearts, the team would finish round robin play with a 6–5 record, which was enough to secure 4th place. They would go on to win the 3–4 page play off game, the semi-final, but would end up losing the final to Colleen Jones.

=== 2009–2013 ===
Starting in the 2009-2010 season Martin would join forces with Canadian Junior Champion Stacie Devereaux, once again playing lead stones. They would compete in the 2010 Newfoundland and Labrador Scotties Tournament of Hearts finishing round robin with a 4–2 record. They would lose the semifinal to Heather Strong. At the 2011 Newfoundland and Labrador Scotties Tournament of Hearts they would finish round robin undefeated at 5-0, defeating Shelley Nichols in the final. At the 2011 Scotties Tournament of Hearts the team would finish with a 1–10 round robin record. The team was less successful at the 2012 Newfoundland and Labrador Scotties Tournament of Hearts, losing in the Laura Philips rink in the semi-final. At the 2013 Newfoundland and Labrador Scotties Tournament of Hearts, the team won another provincial title and represented the province at the 2013 Scotties Tournament of Hearts. The team finished with a 2–9 record there. After the season, Martin retired.
