= Adrienne Mercer =

Canadian curler

- Curler
- Born: January 21, 1980 (age 46); St. John's, Newfoundland and Labrador

Team
- Curling club: RE/MAX Centre, St. John's, NL
- Skip: Sarah Boland
- Third: Kelli Sharpe
- Second: Beth Hamilton
- Lead: Adrienne Mercer
- Alternate: Laura Strong

Curling career
- Member Association: Newfoundland and Labrador
- Hearts: 2 (2021, 2022)
- Top CTRS ranking: 66th (2021–22)

Adrienne Mercer (born January 21, 1980) is a Canadian curler from St. John's, Newfoundland and Labrador. She currently plays lead on Team Sarah Boland.

== Career ==
Mercer played in the 2009 and 2010 Newfoundland and Labrador Scotties Tournament of Hearts with skip Cindy Miller, failing to qualify for the playoffs on both occasions. She played for Beth Hamilton in the 2012, 2013, 2014 and 2017 editions of the event, however, could not qualify for the playoffs in any of her appearances. She joined Team Sarah Hill for the 2020–21 season.

Due to the COVID-19 pandemic in Newfoundland and Labrador, many teams had to opt out of the 2021 Newfoundland and Labrador Scotties Tournament of Hearts as they could not commit to the quarantine process in order to compete in the 2021 Scotties Tournament of Hearts. This meant that only Team Hill and their clubmates Mackenzie Mitchell's rink entered the event. In the best-of-five series, Team Hill defeated Team Mitchell three games to one to earn the right to represent Newfoundland and Labrador at the 2021 Scotties in Calgary, Alberta. At the Tournament of Hearts, they finished with a 2–6 round robin record, with wins against New Brunswick's Melissa Adams and Nunavut's Lori Eddy.

The following season, the provincial championship was cancelled due to the pandemic. As the highest ranked team on the CTRS standings, Team Hill were appointed to represent Newfoundland and Labrador at the 2022 Scotties Tournament of Hearts in Thunder Bay, Ontario. The team once again finished the national championship with a 2–6 record, beating Nunavut's Brigitte MacPhail and upsetting Northern Ontario's Krista McCarville in their two victories.

== Personal life ==
Mercer is employed as a lawyer at McInnes Cooper. She is married to Michael Crawford and has one daughter, Claire.

== Teams ==
Season	Skip	Third	Second	Lead
2008–09	Cindy Miller	Beth Hamilton	Adrienne Mercer	Noelle Thomas
2009–10	Cindy Miller	Beth Hamilton	Noelle Thomas	Adrienne Mercer
2011–12	Beth Hamilton	Sarah Paul	Jillian Waite	Adrienne Mercer
2012–13	Beth Hamilton	Sarah Paul	Jillian Waite	Adrienne Mercer
2013–14	Beth Hamilton	Jillian Waite	Lauren Wasylkiw	Adrienne Mercer
2016–17	Beth Hamilton	Adrienne Mercer	Ashley Rumboldt	Heidi Trickett
2020–21	Sarah Hill	Beth Hamilton	Lauren Barron	Adrienne Mercer
2021–22	Sarah Hill	Kelli Sharpe	Beth Hamilton	Adrienne Mercer
2022–23	Sarah Hill	Kelli Sharpe	Beth Hamilton	Adrienne Mercer
2023–24	Sarah Boland	Kelli Sharpe	Beth Hamilton	Adrienne Mercer
2024–25	Sarah Boland	Kelli Sharpe	Beth Hamilton	Adrienne Mercer
