= Laura Strong =

Canadian curler

- Curler
- Born: Laura Strong; October 31, 1979 (age 47); St. John's, Newfoundland and Labrador, Canada

Team
- Curling club: Caledonian CC, Regina, SK
- Skip: Sarah Boland
- Third: Kelli Sharpe
- Second: Beth Hamilton
- Lead: Adrienne Mercer
- Alternate: Laura Strong

Curling career
- Member Association: Newfoundland and Labrador (1997–2014; 2024–present); Saskatchewan (2014–2020)
- Hearts: 8 (2001, 2005, 2006, 2007, 2008, 2009, 2012, 2014)
- Top CTRS ranking: 12th (2005–06)

Laura May Strong (born October 31, 1979, in St. John's, Newfoundland and Labrador) is a Canadian curler.

== Career ==
=== Juniors ===
Strong made her first national debut, playing lead for her sister, Heather Strong, at the 1997 Canadian Junior Curling Championships, representing Newfoundland. It would be a disappointing event for the Strong sisters, only finishing round robin with a 5–7 record.

In 1998 Strong would team up with Cindy Miller, playing lead stones. At the 1998 Canadian Junior Curling Championships, the team would finish round robin with a 2–10 record

Strong would return to the 1999 Canadian Junior Curling Championships, this time taking over as skip for the team. The change would not provide the team success, finishing in last place with a 2–10 record.

Strong's final junior appearance was at the 2000 Canadian Junior Curling Championships, where again the team failed to make the playoffs, finishing round robin with a 4–7 record.

=== Women's ===
==== Newfoundland and Labrador ====
In 2001, Strong would reunite with her sister, and together would represent Newfoundland and Labrador at the 2001 Scott Tournament of Hearts. This was Strong's first appearance at the event. Strong failed to make the playoffs, finishing round robin with a 4–7 record.

Strong would not qualify for another national championship until 2005, when her team would represent Newfoundland and Labrador at the 2005 Scott Tournament of Hearts. This was the team's worst showing to date. They finished round robin with a last place record of 1–10. In 2006 Strong and her sister would again qualify for the Scott Tournament of Hearts, this time she would finish round robin, tied for fourth place with a 7–4 record. The team would face Quebec's Ève Bélisle in the tiebreaker game, but would come up short, losing the match 2-8. Strong would make a third appearance in a row at the 2007 Scotties Tournament of Hearts. The team would again fail to qualify for the playoffs, finishing round robin with a 5–6 record.

In 2008, Strong and her sister would make changes to her team. They would add Cathy Cunningham and Peg Goss, two former rivals to the lineup. The team would again qualify for the 2008 Scotties Tournament of Hearts, Strong's fourth consecutive appearance. They would finish round robin tied for fourth place, where they would meet Manitoba's Jennifer Jones in the tiebreaker match. The team would eventually lose the match 3-6, missing out on the playoffs. The Strong sisters would qualify for their fifth consecutive trip to the Scotties Tournament of Hearts. Once again Strong would find herself in the middle of the pack after round robin play, finishing with a 5–6 record.

At the 2010 Newfoundland and Labrador Scotties Tournament of Hearts, the Strong sisters were both looking to capture a sixth consecutive provincial title, but this was not to be. The Strong's would lose the final to Shelley Nichols. Cunningham and Goss would retire from competitive curling following the season. In 2011, the Strong's would add Cunningham's daughter Jenn Cunningham and Stephanie Korab to the team. At the 2011 Newfoundland and Labrador Scotties Tournament of Hearts Strong would again make the playoffs, but lost the semi-final to Nichols.

At the 2012 Newfoundland and Labrador Scotties Tournament of Hearts Strong found success, finishing round robin in first place, and defeating Laura Phillips in the final. At the 2012 Scotties Tournament of Hearts, the team would have a disappointing run, finishing 4-7 in round robin play. The following season, Cunningham was replaced by Erica Trickett on the team. The team played in just one World Curling Tour event in the season, the 2012 ROGERS Masters of Curling, where they lost in the quarter-final. The team lost in the final of the 2013 Newfoundland and Labrador Scotties Tournament of Hearts. Following the season, the front-end of the team was replaced with Jessica Cunningham and Kathryn Cooper. While the team did not play in any World Curling Tour events, they did win the 2014 Newfoundland and Labrador Scotties Tournament of Hearts. The team represented their province at the 2014 Scotties Tournament of Hearts in Montreal, where the team finished with a 4–7 record.

==== Saskatchewan ====
In 2014, Strong joined the Nancy Inglis rink, based out of Regina, Saskatchewan. Strong would compete in her first Saskatchewan Scotties Tournament of Hearts in 2016, playing third for Kim Schneider. There, they would finish winless, going 0–5 after the round robin.

Strong would again qualify for the Saskatchewan provincial championship in 2018, playing this time for the former 2011 Canadian Women's Champion and World Silver Medalist, Amber Holland. However, they would have a weak showing, finishing last after round robin play with a 2–6 record. Team Holland would improve upon this performance the following year at the 2019 Saskatchewan Scotties Tournament of Hearts, where they would qualify for the playoffs with a 5–3 record. However, they would lose in the 3v4 game to Kristen Streifel, finishing in 4th. Strong would last compete with Holland at the 2020 Saskatchewan Scotties Tournament of Hearts, where they would fail to qualify for the playoffs, finishing the event with a 2–3 record.

==== Return to Newfoundland and Labrador ====
After taking a break from competitive curling, Strong would return to Newfoundland and Labrador at the 2025 Newfoundland and Labrador Women's Curling Championship, where she was the alternate for the Sarah Boland rink. There, they would finish the round robin with a 3–2 record, just missing the playoffs. The Boland rink would again compete at the 2026 Newfoundland and Labrador Women's Curling Championship, where they would finish third, losing to Mackenzie Mitchell 7–5 in the semifinal.

== Personal life ==
She is in a relationship with fellow curler Danielle Inglis.
