= List of curling clubs in Newfoundland and Labrador =

There are nine curling clubs in the Canadian province of Newfoundland and Labrador which are member associations of the Newfoundland and Labrador Curling Association:

- Bally Haly Golf & Curling Club - St. John's
- Caribou Curling Club - Stephenville
- Carol Curling Club - Labrador City
- Corner Brook Curling Association - Corner Brook
- Exploits Regional Curling Club - Grand Falls-Windsor
- Gander Curling Club - Gander
- Gateway Curling Club - Port aux Basques
- Goose Bay Curling Club - Goose Bay
- St. John's Curling Club - St. John's
