= 1997 Scott Tournament of Hearts =

Canadian women's curling championship

- Host city: Vancouver, British Columbia
- Arena: PNE Agrodome
- Dates: February 22– March 2
- Attendance: 35,390
- Winner: Saskatchewan
- Curling club: Caledonian CC, Regina
- Skip: Sandra Schmirler
- Third: Jan Betker
- Second: Joan McCusker
- Lead: Marcia Gudereit
- Alternate: Atina Ford
- Finalist: Ontario (Alison Goring)

The 1997 Scott Tournament of Hearts, the Canadian women's national curling championship, was held from February 22 to March 2, 1997 at the PNE Agrodome in Vancouver, British Columbia. The total attendance for the week was 35,390, which was the lowest since 1990.

Team Saskatchewan, who was skipped by Sandra Schmirler won the tournament after beating Alison Goring's Ontario rink in the final 8–5. This was Saskatchewan's tenth title overall (eleven including Team Canada) and the third and final one skipped by Schmirler before her death in 2000. At the time, Schmirler joined Connie Laliberte and Vera Pezer as the only skips to win three championships.

Schmirler's rink would go onto represent Canada at the 1997 Ford World Women's Curling Championship in Bern, Switzerland, which they also won. Additionally, they also qualified for the 1997 Canadian Olympic Curling Trials, which they qualified for the 1998 Winter Olympics where they captured the gold medal.

== Teams ==
The teams were listed as follows:

Team Canada	Alberta	British Columbia	Manitoba
St. Catharines CC, St. Catharines Skip: Marilyn Bodogh; Third: Kim Gellard; Second: Corie Beveridge; Lead: Jane Hooper Perroud; Alternate: Lisa Savage	Ottewell CC, Edmonton Skip: Cathy Borst; Third: Heather Godberson; Second: Brenda Bohmer; Lead: Kate Horne; Alternate: Lauren Rouse	Richmond CC, Richmond Skip: Kelley Owen; Third: Marla Geiger; Second: Sherry Fraser; Lead: Christine Jurgenson; Alternate: Lindsay Sparkes	Valour Road CC, Winnipeg Skip: Janet Harvey; Third: Debbie Jones-Walker; Second: Carol Harvey; Lead: Alison Harvey; Alternate: Karen Porritt
New Brunswick	Newfoundland	Nova Scotia	Ontario
Thistle St. Andrews CC, Saint John Skip: Heidi Hanlon; Third: Kathy Floyd (Note: Team New Brunswick alternate Sheri Stewart threw third stones in Draw 16.); Second: June Campbell; Lead: Jane Arseneau; Alternate: Sheri Stewart	St. John's CC, St. John's Skip: Laura Phillips; Third: Cathy Cunningham; Second: Kathy Kerr; Lead: Heather Martin; Alternate: Susan Wright	Mayflower CC, Halifax Skip: Colleen Jones; Third: Helen Radford; Second: Kim Kelly; Lead: Nancy Delahunt (Note: Team Nova Scotia alternate Mary Mattatall threw lead stones in Draw 17.); Alternate: Mary Mattatall	Bayview G&CC, Thornhill Skip: Alison Goring; Third: Lori Eddy; Second: Kim Moore; Lead: Mary Bowman; Alternate: Yvonne Smith
Prince Edward Island	Quebec	Saskatchewan	Northwest Territories/Yukon
Charlottetown CC, Charlottetown Skip: Rebecca Jean MacPhee; Third: Kim Dolan; Second: Marion MacAulay; Lead: Lou Ann Henry (Note: Team Prince Edward Island alternate Sandy Matheson threw lead stones in Draw 17.); Alternate: Sandy Matheson	Buckingham CC, Buckingham Skip: Chantal Osborne; Third: France Charette; Second: Joelle Sabourin; Lead: Sylvie Daniel; Alternate: Janique Berthelot	Caledonian CC, Regina Skip: Sandra Schmirler; Third: Jan Betker (Note: Team Saskatchewan alternate Atina Ford threw third stones in Draw 17.); Second: Joan McCusker; Lead: Marcia Gudereit; Alternate: Atina Ford	Yellowknife CC, Yellowknife Skip: Kelly Kaylo; Third: Sharon Cormier; Second: Wendy Ondrack; Lead: Debbie Moss; Alternate: Cheryl Burlington

== Map of teams ==
Team Canada Provincial Winners

== Round Robin standings ==
Final Round Robin standings

Key
Teams to Playoffs

Team	Skip	W	L	PF	PA	EW	EL	BE	SE	S%
Saskatchewan	Sandra Schmirler	9	2	83	46	47	38	8	13	83%
Ontario	Alison Goring	7	4	69	62	46	46	5	15	77%
Alberta	Cathy Borst	7	4	72	65	45	47	13	9	79%
Newfoundland	Laura Phillips	7	4	65	61	48	41	9	15	78%
Manitoba	Janet Harvey	6	5	69	67	49	46	3	11	75%
Canada	Marilyn Bodogh	5	6	67	83	43	53	1	9	78%
Prince Edward Island	Rebecca Jean MacPhee	5	6	67	71	42	48	4	8	74%
Quebec	Chantal Osborne	5	6	65	62	45	45	7	11	76%
New Brunswick	Heidi Hanlon	4	7	67	75	50	46	4	15	73%
Northwest Territories/Yukon	Kelly Kaylo	4	7	61	79	45	45	9	14	75%
Nova Scotia	Colleen Jones	4	7	65	72	49	46	4	13	76%
British Columbia	Kelley Owen	3	8	64	71	43	51	5	10	76%

== Round Robin results ==
All draw times are listed in Pacific Standard Time (UTC-08:00).

=== Draw 1 ===
Saturday, February 22, 12:30 pm

Sheet A	1	2	3	4	5	6	7	8	9	10	Final
Saskatchewan (Schmirler) 🔨	0	1	0	0	1	0	4	3	X	X	9
Canada (Bodogh)	0	0	1	0	0	1	0	0	X	X	2

Sheet B	1	2	3	4	5	6	7	8	9	10	Final
British Columbia (Owen) 🔨	1	0	0	0	0	0	2	0	0	0	3
Newfoundland (Phillips)	0	0	0	1	1	0	0	0	0	2	4

Sheet C	1	2	3	4	5	6	7	8	9	10	Final
Alberta (Borst) 🔨	0	2	0	0	1	0	0	0	0	1	4
Prince Edward Island (MacPhee)	0	0	1	0	0	0	1	0	0	0	2

Sheet D	1	2	3	4	5	6	7	8	9	10	Final
New Brunswick (Hanlon) 🔨	0	1	0	2	2	0	0	1	0	X	6
Quebec (Osborne)	0	0	2	0	0	1	0	0	1	X	4

=== Draw 2 ===
Saturday, February 22, 6:00 pm

Sheet A	1	2	3	4	5	6	7	8	9	10	Final
Alberta (Borst) 🔨	2	0	2	0	0	2	0	0	0	1	7
Newfoundland (Phillips)	0	1	0	2	2	0	1	0	0	0	6

Sheet B	1	2	3	4	5	6	7	8	9	10	Final
Manitoba (Harvey) 🔨	1	0	1	0	2	0	1	0	0	X	5
Ontario (Goring)	0	0	0	2	0	2	0	2	2	X	8

Sheet C	1	2	3	4	5	6	7	8	9	10	Final
Nova Scotia (Jones) 🔨	1	0	0	0	3	0	0	1	0	0	5
Northwest Territories/Yukon (Kaylo)	0	0	1	1	0	1	1	0	1	1	6

Sheet D	1	2	3	4	5	6	7	8	9	10	Final
British Columbia (Owen) 🔨	1	0	0	3	0	1	0	1	0	0	6
Canada (Bodogh)	0	2	1	0	2	0	1	0	1	2	9

=== Draw 3 ===
Sunday, February 23, 8:30 am

Sheet B	1	2	3	4	5	6	7	8	9	10	Final
Canada (Bodogh) 🔨	0	0	1	0	3	0	0	1	0	1	6
Northwest Territories/Yukon (Kaylo)	1	0	0	0	0	1	1	0	1	0	4

Sheet C	1	2	3	4	5	6	7	8	9	10	Final
Manitoba (Harvey) 🔨	1	0	0	2	0	0	1	0	4	X	8
New Brunswick (Hanlon)	0	0	1	0	0	2	0	1	0	X	4

=== Draw 4 ===
Sunday, February 23, 12:30 pm

Sheet A	1	2	3	4	5	6	7	8	9	10	Final
Quebec (Osborne) 🔨	0	0	0	1	0	4	1	0	1	X	7
Prince Edward Island (MacPhee)	0	0	0	0	1	0	0	2	0	X	3

Sheet B	1	2	3	4	5	6	7	8	9	10	11	Final
Nova Scotia (Jones) 🔨	1	1	1	1	1	0	0	1	0	0	1	7
Ontario (Goring)	0	0	0	0	0	2	2	0	1	1	0	6

Sheet C	1	2	3	4	5	6	7	8	9	10	11	Final
Newfoundland (Phillips) 🔨	1	0	0	2	0	0	1	0	0	2	1	7
Saskatchewan (Schmirler)	0	0	1	0	0	3	0	2	0	0	0	6

Sheet D	1	2	3	4	5	6	7	8	9	10	Final
Northwest Territories/Yukon (Kaylo) 🔨	0	1	0	0	1	1	2	0	0	0	5
Manitoba (Harvey)	0	0	2	0	0	0	0	1	1	0	4

=== Draw 5 ===
Sunday, February 23, 6:00 pm

Sheet A	1	2	3	4	5	6	7	8	9	10	Final
Saskatchewan (Schmirler) 🔨	2	0	4	0	6	X	X	X	X	X	12
Nova Scotia (Jones)	0	1	0	1	0	X	X	X	X	X	2

Sheet B	1	2	3	4	5	6	7	8	9	10	11	Final
New Brunswick (Hanlon) 🔨	1	0	1	0	0	2	0	1	2	0	0	7
Alberta (Borst)	0	2	0	2	1	0	1	0	0	1	3	10

Sheet C	1	2	3	4	5	6	7	8	9	10	Final
Ontario (Goring) 🔨	0	1	1	0	1	0	0	0	1	2	6
Quebec (Osborne)	0	0	0	1	0	1	1	1	0	0	4

Sheet D	1	2	3	4	5	6	7	8	9	10	Final
Prince Edward Island (MacPhee) 🔨	1	0	0	2	0	1	0	1	0	3	8
British Columbia (Owen)	0	0	2	0	2	0	2	0	1	0	7

=== Draw 6 ===
Monday, February 24, 8:30 am

Sheet A	1	2	3	4	5	6	7	8	9	10	Final
Ontario (Goring) 🔨	1	0	0	1	0	2	1	0	1	2	8
Alberta (Borst)	0	0	2	0	1	0	0	2	0	0	5

Sheet B	1	2	3	4	5	6	7	8	9	10	Final
Prince Edward Island (MacPhee) 🔨	1	2	0	0	0	0	1	0	2	2	8
Saskatchewan (Schmirler)	0	0	1	1	2	0	0	2	0	0	6

Sheet C	1	2	3	4	5	6	7	8	9	10	Final
British Columbia (Owen) 🔨	1	0	1	0	2	0	3	1	1	X	9
Nova Scotia (Jones)	0	1	0	2	0	1	0	0	0	X	4

Sheet D	1	2	3	4	5	6	7	8	9	10	Final
Quebec (Osborne) 🔨	0	0	1	0	1	1	1	0	0	1	5
Newfoundland (Phillips)	1	1	0	1	0	0	0	0	`	0	4

=== Draw 7 ===
Monday, February 24, 12:30 pm

Sheet A	1	2	3	4	5	6	7	8	9	10	Final
Newfoundland (Phillips) 🔨	2	0	0	0	1	0	1	3	2	X	9
Northwest Territories/Yukon (Kaylo) 🔨	0	0	5	0	0	1	0	0	0	X	6

Sheet B	1	2	3	4	5	6	7	8	9	10	Final
Saskatchewan (Schmirler) 🔨	0	2	1	0	0	2	0	2	0	2	9
Manitoba (Harvey)	1	0	0	1	1	0	1	0	2	0	6

Sheet C	1	2	3	4	5	6	7	8	9	10	Final
New Brunswick (Hanlon) 🔨	1	1	0	1	0	1	0	1	0	0	5
British Columbia (Owen)	0	0	2	0	1	0	1	0	1	1	6

Sheet D	1	2	3	4	5	6	7	8	9	10	Final
Alberta (Borst) 🔨	1	0	1	0	0	3	1	0	0	4	10
Canada (Bodogh)	0	1	0	1	1	0	0	4	0	0	7

=== Draw 8 ===
Monday, February 24, 6:00 pm

Sheet A	1	2	3	4	5	6	7	8	9	10	Final
Nova Scotia (Jones) 🔨	2	0	0	3	0	1	3	X	X	X	9
New Brunswick (Hanlon)	0	1	0	0	1	0	0	X	X	X	2

Sheet B	1	2	3	4	5	6	7	8	9	10	Final
Northwest Territories/Yukon (Kaylo) 🔨	1	0	0	1	0	1	0	2	0	X	5
Quebec (Osborne)	0	0	1	0	1	0	4	0	5	X	11

Sheet C	1	2	3	4	5	6	7	8	9	10	Final
Manitoba (Harvey) 🔨	1	0	0	2	0	2	1	1	0	1	8
Prince Edward Island (MacPhee)	0	2	1	0	3	0	0	0	1	0	7

Sheet D	1	2	3	4	5	6	7	8	9	10	Final
Canada (Bodogh) 🔨	1	0	0	2	0	0	2	0	0	X	5
Ontario (Goring)	0	1	2	0	1	1	0	2	1	X	8

=== Draw 9 ===
Tuesday, February 25, 8:30 am

Sheet A	1	2	3	4	5	6	7	8	9	10	Final
British Columbia (Owen) 🔨	0	1	0	1	0	2	0	1	0	0	5
Manitoba (Harvey)	1	0	1	0	1	0	2	0	0	2	7

Sheet B	1	2	3	4	5	6	7	8	9	10	11	Final
New Brunswick (Hanlon) 🔨	1	0	0	0	0	1	1	0	1	1	0	5
Saskatchewan (Schmirler)	0	0	2	1	1	0	0	1	0	0	2	7

Sheet C	1	2	3	4	5	6	7	8	9	10	Final
Northwest Territories/Yukon (Kaylo) 🔨	2	0	0	2	0	1	0	1	0	1	7
Alberta (Borst)	0	1	1	0	3	0	0	0	1	0	6

Sheet D	1	2	3	4	5	6	7	8	9	10	Final
Nova Scotia (Jones) 🔨	2	1	0	0	1	2	0	1	0	X	7
Prince Edward Island (MacPhee)	0	0	1	0	0	0	2	0	1	X	4

=== Draw 10 ===
Tuesday, February 25, 12:30 pm

Sheet A	1	2	3	4	5	6	7	8	9	10	Final
Prince Edward Island (MacPhee) 🔨	0	0	0	2	0	0	1	2	0	1	6
Northwest Territories/Yukon (Kaylo)	0	0	1	0	1	1	0	0	1	0	4

Sheet B	1	2	3	4	5	6	7	8	9	10	11	Final
Alberta (Borst) 🔨	2	0	0	0	1	0	0	2	0	0	1	6
Nova Scotia (Jones)	0	1	0	0	0	1	1	0	1	1	0	5

Sheet C	1	2	3	4	5	6	7	8	9	10	Final
Quebec (Osborne) 🔨	1	0	2	1	0	3	0	0	1	0	8
Canada (Bodogh)	0	1	0	0	3	0	2	1	0	2	9

Sheet D	1	2	3	4	5	6	7	8	9	10	Final
Newfoundland (Phillips) 🔨	0	0	1	0	1	0	2	0	0	X	4
Ontario (Goring)	0	1	0	1	0	1	0	2	2	X	7

=== Draw 11 ===
Tuesday, February 25, 6:00 pm

Sheet A	1	2	3	4	5	6	7	8	9	10	Final
Ontario (Goring) 🔨	0	0	0	1	0	0	1	0	X	X	2
British Columbia (Owen)	1	2	0	0	2	2	0	0	X	X	7

Sheet B	1	2	3	4	5	6	7	8	9	10	Final
Manitoba (Harvey) 🔨	2	0	0	1	0	2	0	0	0	0	5
Newfoundland (Phillips)	0	1	1	0	1	0	2	0	1	2	8

Sheet C	1	2	3	4	5	6	7	8	9	10	Final
Saskatchewan (Schmirler) 🔨	0	1	0	0	1	0	1	1	0	0	4
Quebec (Osborne)	0	0	1	0	0	2	0	0	0	0	3

Sheet D	1	2	3	4	5	6	7	8	9	10	Final
Canada (Bodogh) 🔨	3	0	1	0	0	0	0	2	0	X	6
New Brunswick (Hanlon)	0	3	0	2	1	1	2	0	2	X	11

=== Draw 12 ===
Wednesday, February 26, 8:30 am

Sheet A	1	2	3	4	5	6	7	8	9	10	Final
Manitoba (Harvey) 🔨	1	1	1	0	1	0	1	1	1	X	7
Canada (Bodogh)	0	0	0	3	0	1	0	0	0	X	4

Sheet B	1	2	3	4	5	6	7	8	9	10	11	Final
British Columbia (Owen) 🔨	0	0	0	1	0	3	0	0	0	2	0	6
Quebec (Osborne)	1	0	1	0	1	0	1	1	1	0	1	7

Sheet C	1	2	3	4	5	6	7	8	9	10	Final
Nova Scotia (Jones) 🔨	1	0	0	2	0	1	0	1	0	0	5
Newfoundland (Phillips)	0	0	1	0	2	0	1	0	1	1	6

Sheet D	1	2	3	4	5	6	7	8	9	10	Final
Ontario (Goring) 🔨	0	1	0	0	0	1	0	0	X	X	2
Saskatchewan (Schmirler)	0	0	3	0	2	0	1	1	X	X	7

=== Draw 13 ===
Wednesday, February 26, 12:30 pm

Sheet A	1	2	3	4	5	6	7	8	9	10	Final
New Brunswick (Hanlon) 🔨	0	3	0	1	2	2	0	1	0	X	9
Northwest Territories/Yukon (Kaylo)	2	0	2	0	0	0	2	0	1	X	7

Sheet B	1	2	3	4	5	6	7	8	9	10	Final
Prince Edward Island (MacPhee) 🔨	1	1	0	1	0	1	0	0	1	X	5
Ontario (Goring)	0	0	3	0	2	0	2	2	0	X	9

Sheet C	1	2	3	4	5	6	7	8	9	10	Final
Alberta (Borst) 🔨	1	0	0	2	1	0	1	0	1	X	6
Manitoba (Harvey)	0	0	2	0	0	1	0	1	0	X	4

Sheet D	1	2	3	4	5	6	7	8	9	10	Final
Quebec (Osborne) 🔨	0	0	0	2	0	0	1	0	2	0	5
Nova Scotia (Jones)	1	1	1	0	0	1	0	2	0	1	7

=== Draw 14 ===
Wednesday, February 26, 6:00 pm

Sheet A	1	2	3	4	5	6	7	8	9	10	Final
Newfoundland (Phillips) 🔨	1	0	0	1	1	1	0	0	2	X	6
New Brunswick (Hanlon)	0	1	1	0	0	0	1	1	0	X	4

Sheet B	1	2	3	4	5	6	7	8	9	10	Final
Northwest Territories/Yukon (Kaylo) 🔨	0	1	0	3	0	0	0	2	1	1	8
British Columbia (Owen)	0	0	1	0	3	1	2	0	0	0	7

Sheet C	1	2	3	4	5	6	7	8	9	10	Final
Canada (Bodogh) 🔨	2	0	0	0	1	1	0	0	X	X	4
Prince Edward Island (MacPhee)	0	2	1	2	0	0	3	3	X	X	11

Sheet D	1	2	3	4	5	6	7	8	9	10	Final
Saskatchewan (Schmirler) 🔨	2	1	0	2	1	2	0	1	X	X	9
Alberta (Borst)	0	0	1	0	0	0	1	0	X	X	2

=== Draw 15 ===
Thursday, February 27, 8:30 am

Sheet A	1	2	3	4	5	6	7	8	9	10	Final
Alberta (Borst) 🔨	1	0	2	0	1	1	0	0	0	0	5
Quebec (Osborne)	0	2	0	2	0	0	0	2	0	1	7

Sheet B	1	2	3	4	5	6	7	8	9	10	Final
Canada (Bodogh) 🔨	2	1	1	0	1	1	0	1	X	X	7
Newfoundland (Phillips)	0	0	0	1	0	0	1	0	X	X	2

Sheet C	1	2	3	4	5	6	7	8	9	10	Final
Ontario (Goring) 🔨	2	1	0	1	0	0	2	2	0	X	8
Northwest Territories/Yukon (Kaylo)	0	0	1	0	2	2	0	0	0	X	5

Sheet D	1	2	3	4	5	6	7	8	9	10	Final
Prince Edward Island (MacPhee) 🔨	1	0	2	0	2	0	0	2	0	X	7
New Brunswick (Hanlon)	0	1	0	1	0	1	1	0	2	X	6

=== Draw 16 ===
Thursday, February 27, 12:30 pm

Sheet A	1	2	3	4	5	6	7	8	9	10	11	Final
Saskatchewan (Schmirler) 🔨	1	0	1	0	2	1	0	0	0	0	1	6
British Columbia (Owen)	0	2	0	1	0	0	0	1	0	1	0	5

Sheet B	1	2	3	4	5	6	7	8	9	10	Final
Nova Scotia (Jones) 🔨	1	0	1	0	2	0	1	0	2	0	7
Canada (Bodogh)	0	1	0	2	0	3	0	1	0	1	8

Sheet C	1	2	3	4	5	6	7	8	9	10	Final
New Brunswick (Hanlon) 🔨	1	0	2	1	0	2	0	1	1	X	8
Ontario (Goring)	0	3	0	0	1	0	1	0	0	X	5

Sheet D	1	2	3	4	5	6	7	8	9	10	Final
Quebec (Osborne) 🔨	1	0	0	1	0	1	0	1	0	X	4
Manitoba (Harvey)	0	2	0	0	3	0	1	0	1	X	7

=== Draw 17 ===
Thursday, February 27, 6:00 pm

Sheet A	1	2	3	4	5	6	7	8	9	10	11	Final
Manitoba (Harvey) 🔨	1	0	2	0	0	2	0	0	2	0	1	8
Nova Scotia (Jones)	0	1	0	1	2	0	0	1	0	2	0	7

Sheet B	1	2	3	4	5	6	7	8	9	10	Final
Newfoundland (Phillips) 🔨	1	0	2	0	1	0	2	2	1	X	9
Prince Edward Island (MacPhee)	0	2	0	2	0	3	0	0	0	X	6

Sheet C	1	2	3	4	5	6	7	8	9	10	Final
British Columbia (Owen) 🔨	1	1	0	1	0	0	0	0	X	X	3
Alberta (Borst)	0	0	1	0	1	4	2	3	X	X	11

Sheet D	1	2	3	4	5	6	7	8	9	10	Final
Northwest Territories/Yukon (Kaylo) 🔨	0	1	0	1	0	1	0	1	0	X	4
Saskatchewan (Schmirler)	0	0	3	0	3	0	1	0	1	X	8

== Playoffs ==
Page playoffs
1	Saskatchewan	6
2	Ontario	5
3	Alberta	6
4	Newfoundland	7

Semifinal
2	Ontario	9
4	Newfoundland	4

Final
1	Saskatchewan	8
2	Ontario	5

=== 3 vs. 4 ===
Friday, February 28, 12:30 pm

Sheet B	1	2	3	4	5	6	7	8	9	10	11	Final
Alberta (Borst) 🔨	1	0	2	0	0	2	0	0	0	1	0	6
Newfoundland (Phillips)	0	1	0	1	1	0	1	1	1	0	1	7

Player percentages
Alberta		Newfoundland	
Kate Horne	84%	Heather Martin	85%
Brenda Bohmer	77%	Kathy Kerr	80%
Heather Godberson	82%	Cathy Cunningham	78%
Cathy Borst	63%	Laura Phillips	80%
Total	76%	Total	81%

=== 1 vs. 2 ===
Friday, February 28, 6:00 pm

Sheet C	1	2	3	4	5	6	7	8	9	10	Final
Saskatchewan (Schmirler) 🔨	0	1	0	2	1	0	0	2	0	X	6
Ontario (Goring)	1	0	2	0	0	1	0	0	1	X	5

Player percentages
Saskatchewan		Ontario	
Marcia Gudereit	84%	Mary Bowman	78%
Joan McCusker	86%	Kim Moore	83%
Jan Betker	75%	Lori Eddy	66%
Sandra Schmirler	76%	Alison Goring	76%
Total	80%	Total	76%

=== Semifinal ===
Saturday, March 1, 12:30 pm

Sheet B	1	2	3	4	5	6	7	8	9	10	Final
Ontario (Goring) 🔨	1	0	0	3	1	0	3	1	X	X	9
Newfoundland (Phillips)	0	2	1	0	0	1	0	0	X	X	4

Player percentages
Ontario		Newfoundland	
Mary Bowman	95%	Heather Martin	84%
Kim Moore	72%	Kathy Kerr	73%
Lori Eddy	78%	Cathy Cunningham	89%
Alison Goring	83%	Laura Phillips	47%
Total	82%	Total	73%

=== Final ===
Sunday, March 2, 10:30 am

Sheet B	1	2	3	4	5	6	7	8	9	10	Final
Saskatchewan (Schmirler) 🔨	1	2	0	1	0	0	2	0	2	X	8
Ontario (Goring)	0	0	2	0	2	0	0	1	0	X	5

Player percentages
Saskatchewan		Ontario	
Marcia Gudereit	92%	Mary Bowman	88%
Joan McCusker	84%	Kim Moore	83%
Jan Betker	79%	Lori Eddy	69%
Sandra Schmirler	71%	Alison Goring	67%
Total	81%	Total	77%

== Statistics ==
=== Top 5 player percentages ===
Final Round Robin Percentages

Key
First All-Star Team
Second All-Star Team

Leads	%
(Ontario) Jane Hooper Perroud	88
(Newfoundland and Labrador) Heather Martin	87
(Ontario) Mary Bowman	86
(Saskatchewan) Marcia Gudereit	85
(Quebec) Sylvie Daniel	83
(Alberta) Kate Horne	83

Seconds	%
(Saskatchewan) Joan McCusker	82
(Nova Scotia) Kim Kelly	81
(Ontario) Corie Beveridge	80
(Alberta) Brenda Bohmer	78
(Quebec) Joelle Sabourin	77
(Newfoundland and Labrador) Kathy Kerr	77
(British Columbia) Sherry Fraser	77

Thirds	%
(Saskatchewan) Jan Betker	85
(Alberta) Heather Godberson	83
(Prince Edward Island) Kim Dolan	77
(Ontario) Lori Eddy	77
(Newfoundland and Labrador) Cathy Cunningham	76

Skips	%
(Saskatchewan) Sandra Schmirler	80
(Manitoba) Janet Harvey	75
(Quebec) Chantal Osborne	74
(Canada) Marilyn Bodogh	73
(British Columbia) Kelley Owen	72
(Nova Scotia) Colleen Jones	72
(Newfoundland and Labrador) Laura Phillips	72
(Ontario) Alison Goring	72

== Awards ==
The all-star team and sportsmanship award winners were as follows.

=== All-Star teams ===
This was the first tournament in which a first and second all-star teams were selected. Team Saskatchewan members Sandra Schmirler (skip), Jan Betker (third), and Joan McCusker (second) became the first curlers to be selected to the all-star team on three separate occasions. Schmirler was previously selected in 1987 and 1993, Betker in 1987 and 1994, and McCusker in 1994 and 1995.

==== First Team ====
Position	Name	Team
Skip	Sandra Schmirler (3)	Saskatchewan
Third	Jan Betker (3)	Saskatchewan
Second	Joan McCusker (3)	Saskatchewan
Lead	Jane Hooper Perroud	Ontario

==== Second Team ====
Position	Name	Team
Skip	Alison Goring	Ontario
Third	Heather Godberson	Alberta
Second	Corie Beveridge	Canada
Lead	Heather Martin	Newfoundland

=== Diana Doe Award ===
The Scotties Tournament of Hearts Sportsmanship Award is presented to the curler who best embodies the spirit of curling at the Scotties Tournament of Hearts. The winner was selected in a vote by all players at the tournament.

Prior to 1998, the award was named after a notable individual in the curling community where the tournament was held that year. For this edition, the award was named after Diana Doe, who was a player and coached junior teams in Saskatchewan, Alberta, and British Columbia. She also was an executive of the British Columbia Curling Association, serving as president in 1989 and was a director of Curling Canada for many years.

Team Ontario skip Alison Goring became the first curler to receive the sportsmanship award on three occasions as she had won in 1991 and 1995.

Name	Team	Position
Alison Goring (3)	Ontario	Skip

=== Most Valuable Player Award ===
Starting in 1997, a curler was chosen by TSN commentators for their outstanding play during the playoff round.

Name	Team	Position
Marcia Gudereit	Saskatchewan	Lead

=== Ford Hot Shots ===
The Ford Hot Shots was a skills competition preceding the round robin of the tournament. Each competitor had to perform a series of shots with each shot scoring between 0 and 5 points depending on where the stone came to rest. The winner of this edition of the event would win a two-year lease on a Ford Contour.

Winner	Runner-Up	Score
(British Columbia) Sherry Fraser	(Saskatchewan) Jan Betker	18–17

=== Shot of the Week Award ===
Beginning with the 1997 tournament, the Shot of the Week Award was voted on by TSN commentators and presented to the curler who had been determined with the most outstanding shot during the championship.

Name	Team	Position
Sandra Schmirler	Saskatchewan	Skip
