= 2019 Newfoundland and Labrador Scotties Tournament of Hearts =

- Host city: St. John's, Newfoundland and Labrador
- Arena: Bally Haly Golf & Curling Club
- Dates: January 10–12
- Winner: Team Sharpe
- Curling club: Re/Max Centre, St. John's
- Skip: Kelli Sharpe
- Third: Stephanie Guzzwell
- Second: Beth Hamilton
- Lead: Carrie Vautour
- Coach: Leslie Anne Walsh
- Finalist: Cathlia Ward

The 2019 Newfoundland and Labrador Women's Curling Championship, the women's provincial curling championship for Newfoundland and Labrador, was held from January 10 to 12 at the Bally Haly Golf & Curling Club in St. John's, Newfoundland and Labrador. The winning Sharpe team represented Newfoundland and Labrador at the 2019 Scotties Tournament of Hearts in Sydney, Nova Scotia.

The event featured a brand new champion, as none of the skips that entered have won the provincial championship as a skip before.

== Teams ==
Teams are as follows:

Skip	Vice	Second	Lead	Club
Wendy Dunne	Jennifer Taylor	Andrea Heffernan	Carolyn Walters	Re/Max Centre, St. John's
Mackenzie Glynn	Katie Follett	Sarah Chaytor	Camille Burt	Re/Max Centre, St. John's
Sarah Hill	Lauren Barron	Sydney Parsons	Heidi Trickett	Re/Max Centre, St. John's
Kelli Sharpe	Stephanie Guzzwell	Beth Hamilton	Carrie Vautour	Re/Max Centre, St. John's
Erica Trickett	Erin Porter	Brooke Godsland	Julie Devereaux	Re/Max Centre, St. John's
Cathlia Ward	Jessica Cunningham	Cindy Miller	Noelle Thomas-Kennell	Re/Max Centre, St. John's

== Round-robin standings ==
Key
Teams to Playoffs

Skip	W	L
Sharpe	4	1
Ward	4	1
Trickett	3	2
Hill	2	3
Dunne	1	4
Glynn	1	4

== Round-robin results ==
=== January 10 ===
Draw 1

- Dunne 9-3 Glynn
- Ward 8-7 Trickett
- Sharpe 7-6 Hill

Draw 2

- Trickett 9-4 Hill
- Sharpe 8-2 Glynn
- Ward 11-5 Dunne

=== January 11 ===
Draw 3

- Sharpe 11-5 Dunne
- Ward 9-8 Hill
- Glynn 8-7 Trickett

=== January 12 ===
Draw 4

- Sharpe 8-2 Ward
- Trickett 8-3 Dunne
- Hill 8-4 Glynn

Draw 5

- Ward 9-8 Glynn
- Hill 11-6 Dunne
- Trickett 8-4 Sharpe

== Final ==
Sunday, January 13, 2:30pm

Sheet 2	1	2	3	4	5	6	7	8	9	10	Final
Cathlia Ward	0	0	0	0	1	0	2	0	1	0	4
Kelli Sharpe	0	0	0	1	0	1	0	1	0	2	5

2019 Newfoundland and Labrador Tournament of Hearts

Kelli Sharpe
4th Newfoundland and Labrador Provincial Championship title
