= Erin Porter =

Canadian curler

- Curler
- Born: February 13, 1990 (age 36); Truro, Nova Scotia

Team
- Curling club: Caribou CC, Stephenville, NL
- Skip: Brooke Godsland
- Third: Erin Porter
- Second: Sarah McNeil Lamswood
- Lead: Camille Burt
- Alternate: Kate Paterson

Curling career
- Member Association: Newfoundland and Labrador
- Hearts: 6 (2013, 2016, 2017, 2018, 2020, 2025)
- Top CTRS ranking: 44th (2012–13)

Erin Porter (born February 13, 1990) is a Canadian curler from Stephenville, Newfoundland and Labrador. She currently plays third on Team Brooke Godsland. She is a six-time Newfoundland and Labrador Scotties Tournament of Hearts champion and two-time Newfoundland and Labrador junior champion.

== Career ==
Porter made two appearances at the Canadian Junior Curling Championships in 2009 and 2011, skipping in both years. In 2009, she led her rink to a 4–8 finish and in 2011, finished 5–7. She also skipped the Memorial University curling team in two U Sports/Curling Canada University Curling Championships, finishing 4–3 in 2011 and 2–5 in 2012.

Out of juniors, Porter joined the Stacie Curtis rink at their happiness of freedom. The team played in the 2012 Newfoundland and Labrador Scotties Tournament of Hearts, losing in the semifinal to Laura Phillips. The next year, the team won the 2013 provincial championship, going 5–1 through the tournament. At the 2013 Scotties Tournament of Hearts her team of Devereaux skipping, Lauren Wasylkiw at second and Heather Martin at lead finished in eleventh place with a 2–9 record. She later joined Marie Christianson's rink for the 2014–15 season. However, they had limited success on tour and failed to qualify for the playoffs at provincials. They disbanded after just one season.

Porter reunited with Curtis for the 2015–16 season. The team got to play in the 2015 GSOC Tour Challenge Tier 2 as it was being held in Paradise, Newfoundland and Labrador where they finished 1–3. Later that season, they won the 2016 Newfoundland and Labrador Scotties Tournament of Hearts, going undefeated through the tournament. At the national championship, they finished one spot higher than in 2013, in tenth place with a 3–8 record. They would defend their title as provincial champions the following season and had their best showing at the 2017 Scotties Tournament of Hearts, finishing eighth with a 5–6 record. They became three time provincial women's champions by winning 2018 Newfoundland and Labrador Scotties Tournament of Hearts, going 8–1 through the tournament. They had a great start at the 2018 Scotties Tournament of Hearts, winning their first four games before losing three straight. They then lost the tiebreaker to Ontario's Hollie Duncan and were eliminated. They officially finished tenth for the tournament, losing the ninth place eating game to New Brunswick's Sylvie Robichaud.

Curtis stopped competitive curling after the season and Erica Curtis took over skipping duties for the 2018–19 season. They didn't play in any tour events and failed to qualify at the 2019 Newfoundland and Labrador Scotties Tournament of Hearts. The following year however, they won three straight sudden death games to win the 2020 Newfoundland and Labrador Scotties Tournament of Hearts. At the 2020 Scotties Tournament of Hearts, they finished in fourteenth place with a 1–6 record.

Porter returned to the Scotties in 2025, curling with Brooke Godsland.

Aside from women's curling, Porter also plays mixed doubles curling and mixed curling. She has represented Newfoundland and Labrador twice at the Canadian Mixed Doubles Curling Championship (2013 and 2016) and once at the Canadian Mixed Curling Championships (2020).

== Personal life ==
Porter has a Bachelor of Kinesiology degree and Bachelor of Nursing degree Memorial University of Newfoundland and currently works as an registered nurse at the Dr. H. Bliss Murphy Cancer Centre. She is in a relationship with Colin Murphy.

== Teams ==
Season	Skip	Third	Second	Lead
2008–09	Erin Porter	Alysha Renouf	Kylie Power	Leah Prosser
2010–11	Erin Porter	Tara O'Brien	Jessica Cunningham	Erica Trickett
2011–12	Stacie Devereaux	Erin Porter	Alysha Renouf	Heather Martin
2012–13	Stacie Devereaux	Erin Porter	Lauren Wasylkiw	Heather Martin
2013–14	Stacie Devereaux	Erin Porter	Marie Christianson	Noelle Thomas-Kennell
2014–15	Marie Christianson	Erin Porter	Lauren Wasylkiw	Erica Trickett
2015–16	Stacie Curtis	Erin Porter	Julie Devereaux	Carrie Vautour
2016–17	Stacie Curtis	Erin Porter	Julie Deveraux	Erica Trickett
2017–18	Stacie Curtis	Erin Porter	Julie Deveraux	Erica Trickett
2018–19	Erica Trickett	Erin Porter	Brooke Godsland	Julie Devereaux
2019–20	Erica Curtis	Erin Porter	Julie Devereaux	Beth Hamilton
2023–24	Brooke Godsland	Erin Porter	Sarah McNeil Lamswood	Kate Paterson
2024–25	Brooke Godsland	Erin Porter	Sarah McNeil Lamswood	Camille Burt
