= Stephanie LeDrew =

Canadian curler (born 1984)

- Curler
- Born: June 6, 1984 (age 42); Corner Brook, Newfoundland and Labrador

Team
- Curling club: Sarnia G&CC, Sarnia, ON

Curling career
- Member Association: Newfoundland and Labrador (1997–2011); Ontario (2011–present)
- Hearts: 4 (2010, 2013, 2014, 2018)
- World Championship: 2 (2013, 2014)
- Top CTRS ranking: 20th (2017–18)
Medal record
Women's curling
Representing Canada
World Curling Championships
| Silver medal – second place | 2014 Saint John |
| Bronze medal – third place | 2013 Riga |
Scotties Tournament of Hearts
| Gold medal – first place | 2014 Montreal |
Representing Ontario
Scotties Tournament of Hearts
| Gold medal – first place | 2013 Kingston |

Stephanie "Steph" Mumford (née LeDrew; born June 6, 1984, in Corner Brook, Newfoundland and Labrador) is a Canadian curler from Sarnia, Ontario.

== Career ==
As a junior, LeDrew represented Newfoundland and Labrador at the Canadian Junior Curling Championships after winning the junior provincial championship five times (1998, 2001, 2002, 2003 & 2004). At the 2002 Canadian Juniors, LeDrew's team, skipped by Jennifer Guzzwell, lost in the final to Prince Edward Island. Winning the province's Mixed Curling Championship, LeDrew represented Newfoundland and Labrador at the 2007 Canadian Mixed Curling Championship (lead) and the 2010 Canadian Mixed Curling Championship (third). Success in 2010 continued as LeDrew's team, skipped by Shelley Nichols, defeated Heather Strong's rink in an extra-end decision to win the Newfoundland and Labrador Scotties Provincial Championship and send the team to the National 2010 Scotties Tournament of Hearts. After relocating to Ontario in 2011, LeDrew joined Team Jill Mouzar at third, skipped by Jill Mouzar, playing out of the Donalda Club in Don Mills, Ontario. After a successful 2012–2013 season, Team Mouzar secured a berth at the 2013 Ontario Scotties Tournament of Hearts. Despite the team coming up short, LeDrew was selected by the eventual winning team, Rachel Homan and her rink, to represent team Ontario, playing fifth, at the Scotties Tournament of Hearts in Kingston, Ontario. Team Ontario defeated Jennifer Jones and Team Manitoba to win the 2013 Scotties Tournament of Hearts and become Team Canada. The team represented Canada 2013 World Women's Curling Championship in Riga, Latvia in March 2013, where they won a bronze medal, although LeDrew did not play in a single match.

After the 2012–13 season, Mouzar returned to her native Nova Scotia, and the team's lead, Hollie Nicol became the skip.

== Personal life ==
LeDrew currently resides in Sarnia, Ontario and works as an account representative for CR Creative Co. Her brother is 2006 Newfoundland and Labrador champion Ryan LeDrew and also lives in Sarnia. She is married to Scott Mumford.

== Charities ==
LeDrew has been involved in numerous charities throughout her career. In 2008, she was among some of Canada's top curlers for the Curl for wishes Bonspiel in Charlottetown, Prince Edward Island in aid of the Children's Wish Foundation. Annually she attends the Kurl for Kids Celebrity Pro-Am Bonspiel in Oakville, Ontario, in aid of the Oakville Hospital Foundation. An annual participant as a celebrity skip for the House of Hearts Charity Bonspiel at the Duluth Curling Club in Duluth, Minnesota.
