= Newfoundland and Labrador Curling Association =

- Sport: Curling
- Jurisdiction: Provincial
- Membership: 14 curling clubs
- Abbreviation: NLCA
- Affiliation: Curling Canada
- Headquarters: St. John's

Official website
- www.curlingnl.ca
- (Canada)

The Newfoundland and Labrador Curling Association (NLCA) is the regional governing body for the sport of curling in Newfoundland and Labrador. The association organizes its member clubs into 4 regions: North, Central, East and West.

== Provincial championships ==
In 2019 the NLCA is hosting ten provincial championships:

- Newfoundland and Labrador Tankard (Men's)
- Newfoundland and Labrador Scotties Tournament of Hearts (Women's)
- Mixed
- Mixed Doubles
- U18 Juniors
- U16 Juniors
- Seniors
- Masters
- Club Championships
- Wheelchair

== See also ==
- List of curling clubs in Newfoundland and Labrador
