= Beth Hamilton =

Canadian curler

- Curler
- Born: October 25, 1980 (age 46); St. John's, Newfoundland and Labrador

Team
- Curling club: St. John's CC, St. John's, NL
- Skip: Sarah Boland
- Third: Kelli Sharpe
- Second: Beth Hamilton
- Lead: Adrienne Mercer
- Alternate: Laura Strong

Curling career
- Member Association: Newfoundland and Labrador
- Hearts: 5 (2005, 2019, 2020, 2021, 2022)
- Top CTRS ranking: 66th (2021–22)

Beth Hamilton (born October 25, 1980) is a Canadian curler from St. John's, Newfoundland and Labrador. She currently plays second on Team Sarah Boland. She is a three-time Newfoundland and Labrador Scotties Tournament of Hearts champion.

== Career ==
Hamilton competed in two Canadian Junior Curling Championships in 1999 and 2000, playing lead for Laura Strong on both occasions. They finished with a 2–10 record in 1999 and with a 4–8 record in 2000. She won her first Newfoundland and Labrador Scotties Tournament of Hearts in 2005 playing second for Heather Strong. They finished 1–10 at the 2005 Scott Tournament of Hearts, held in St. John's. She would not win another provincial championship for fourteen years until her team of Kelli Sharpe, Stephanie Guzzwell and Carrie Vautour won the 2019 Newfoundland and Labrador Scotties, defeating Cathlia Ward in the final. The team struggled at the 2019 Scotties Tournament of Hearts however, finishing tied for last in their pool with a 1–6 record. The following season, she joined the Erica Curtis rink with Erin Porter at third and Julie Devereaux at second. The team won three straight sudden death games to win the 2020 Newfoundland and Labrador Scotties Tournament of Hearts. At the 2020 Scotties Tournament of Hearts, they finished in fourteenth place with a 1–6 record.

Hamilton joined the Sarah Hill rink for the 2020–21 season. Due to the COVID-19 pandemic in Newfoundland and Labrador, many teams had to opt out of the 2021 Newfoundland and Labrador Scotties Tournament of Hearts as they could not commit to the quarantine process in order to compete in the 2021 Scotties Tournament of Hearts. This meant that only Team Hill and their clubmates Mackenzie Mitchell's rink entered the event. In the best-of-five series, Team Hill defeated Team Mitchell three games to one to earn the right to represent Newfoundland and Labrador at the 2021 Scotties in Calgary, Alberta. At the Tournament of Hearts, they finished with a 2–6 round robin record, with wins against New Brunswick's Melissa Adams and Nunavut's Lori Eddy.

The following season, the provincial championship was cancelled due to the pandemic. As the highest ranked team on the CTRS standings, Team Hill were appointed to represent Newfoundland and Labrador at the 2022 Scotties Tournament of Hearts in Thunder Bay, Ontario. The team once again finished the national championship with a 2–6 record, beating Nunavut's Brigitte MacPhail and upsetting Northern Ontario's Krista McCarville in their two victories.

== Personal life ==
Hamilton studied pharmacy at Memorial University of Newfoundland and currently works as a pharmacist at Lawtons. She is in a relationship with Stephen Sharpe.

== Teams ==
| Season | Skip | Third | Second | Lead |
|---|---|---|---|---|
| 1998–99 | Laura Strong | Cindy Miller | Kim Conway | Beth Hamilton |
| 1999–00 | Laura Strong | Cindy Miller | Kim Conway | Beth Hamilton |
| 2004–05 | Heather Strong | Laura Strong | Beth Hamilton | Susan O'Leary |
| 2011–12 | Beth Hamilton | Sarah Paul | Jillian Waite | Adrienne Mercer |
| 2012–13 | Beth Hamilton | Sarah Paul | Jillian Waite | Adrienne Mercer |
| 2013–14 | Beth Hamilton | Jillian Waite | Lauren Wasylkiw | Adrienne Mercer |
| 2014–15 | Kelli Sharpe | Michelle Jewer | Beth Hamilton | Rhonda Whelan |
| 2016–17 | Beth Hamilton | Adrienne Mercer | Ashley Rumboldt | Heidi Trickett |
| 2017–18 | Beth Hamilton | Sarah Hill | Heidi Trickett | Jeannette Piper |
| 2018–19 | Kelli Sharpe | Stephanie Guzzwell | Beth Hamilton | Carrie Vautour |
| 2019–20 | Erica Curtis | Erin Porter | Julie Devereaux | Beth Hamilton |
| 2020–21 | Sarah Hill | Beth Hamilton | Lauren Barron | Adrienne Mercer |
| 2021–22 | Sarah Hill | Kelli Sharpe | Beth Hamilton | Adrienne Mercer |
| 2022–23 | Sarah Hill | Kelli Sharpe | Beth Hamilton | Adrienne Mercer |
| 2023–24 | Sarah Boland | Kelli Sharpe | Beth Hamilton | Adrienne Mercer |
| 2024–25 | Sarah Boland | Kelli Sharpe | Beth Hamilton | Adrienne Mercer |
