= Peg Goss =

Canadian curler

Peg Goss (born January 31, 1960, in St. John's, Newfoundland) is a Canadian curler. She previously played lead for the team of Heather Strong.

Goss has played in four Tournament of Hearts. In 1988, she played second for Maria Thomas. She would then play in three straight Hearts from 2002 to 2004 as Cathy Cunningham's third. It was in 2003 that the team lost in the final to Colleen Jones. Goss was also an alternate at the 1998 Hearts for Strong.
