= Stephanie Guzzwell =

Canadian curler

- Curler
- Born: May 1, 1987 (age 39); St. John's, Newfoundland and Labrador

Team
- Curling club: ReMax Centre, St. John's

Curling career
- Member Association: Newfoundland and Labrador (2003–2019); Nova Scotia (2019–present)
- Hearts: 2 (2011, 2019)
Medal record
Curling
Representing Canada
World Junior Championships
| Silver medal – second place | 2007 Eveleth |

Cst. Stephanie Guzzwell (born May 1, 1987 in St. John's, Newfoundland and Labrador) is a Canadian curler who resides in Oxford, Nova Scotia.

== Career ==
=== Juniors ===
Guzzwell was a member of the Stacie Devereaux junior rink, which finished 7th place at the 2003 Canada Winter Games and won four Newfoundland and Labrador junior women's championships between 2004 and 2007. Guzzell played third on the team. The team represented the province at the Canadian Junior Curling Championships in each of those years, going 8–4 in 2004, 5–7 in 2005, 5–6 in 2006 and winning the championship in 2007, with a 12–1 record. The team represented Canada at the 2007 World Junior Curling Championships, winning a silver medal. After posting a 6–3 round robin record, they won their semifinal match against Denmark, but lost in the final against Scotland.

=== Women's ===
After juniors, Guzzwell remained a member of the Devereaux rink. The team won the 2011 Newfoundland and Labrador Scotties Tournament of Hearts provincial women's championship. They represented the province at the national 2011 Scotties Tournament of Hearts, where they finished with a 1–10 record. Guzzwell left the team after the season.

Guzzwell skipped her own team for two seasons between 2013 and 2015 before joining the Heather Strong rink as her third between 2015 and 2017.

Guzzwell joined the Kelli Sharpe (Turpin) rink in 2018 as her third. The team won the 2019 Newfoundland and Labrador Scotties Tournament of Hearts.

== Personal life ==
Guzzwell is employed as a police officer with the RCMP. She is originally from Mount Pearl, Newfoundland and Labrador. Guzzwell attended Memorial University as a business administration student. While at Memorial, Guzzwell was the skip of the university's curling team. They played in the 2008 national championship.
