= Cathy Cunningham =

Canadian curler (born 1959)

- Curler
- Born: December 30, 1959 (age 66); St. John's, Newfoundland and Labrador, Canada

Curling career
- Member Association: Newfoundland and Labrador
- Hearts: 14 (1988, 1991, 1993, 1994, 1995, 1996, 1997, 2002, 2003, 2004, 2006, 2007, 2008, 2009)
Medal record
Women's curling
Representing Newfoundland and Labrador
Scotties Tournament of Hearts
Silver medal – second place	2003 Kitchener
Bronze medal – third place	1997 Vancouver

Cathy Cunningham (born December 30, 1959, in St. John's, Newfoundland) is a Canadian curler.

== Career ==
Cunningham played in her first Tournament of Hearts, Canada's national women's curling championship, in 1988 as a third for Maria Thomas. The team finished 6–5. Cunningham returned again in 1991 as a skip but finished with a 2–9 record. In 1993 she returned again, playing third for Thomas, this time finishing with a 5–6 record. The next year she joined up with Laura Phillips and the team lost in their final tie-breaker match to Sherry Anderson of Saskatchewan. Cunningham was Phillips' third for the next three Tournament of Hearts, finishing with a 5–6 record in 1995 and 1996 and losing to Alison Goring of Ontario in the 1997 semi-final.

Cunningham would not return to the Hearts until the 2002 Scott Tournament of Hearts where she skipped her own team to a 3–8 record. At the 2003 Scott Tournament of Hearts her team finished the round-robin with a 6–5 record, but they managed to make the playoffs, where they beat Jan Betker of Saskatchewan and then Suzanne Gaudet of Prince Edward Island before losing to defending champion Colleen Jones in the final.

At the 2004 Scott Tournament of Hearts, Cunningham finished 6–5 once again but did not qualify for the playoffs.

In January 2008, Cunningham won the right to represent Newfoundland and Labrador at 2008 Scotties Tournament of Hearts playing third for Heather Strong.
