= Heather Strong =

Canadian curler and synchronized swimmer

- Curler
- Born: Heather Strong; November 9, 1976 (age 50); St. John's, Newfoundland and Labrador

Team
- Curling club: St. John's CC, St. John's, NL
- Skip: Heather Strong
- Third: Jessica Wiseman
- Second: Laura Strong
- Lead: Brooke Godsland

Curling career
- Member Association: Newfoundland and Labrador
- Hearts: 12 (1998, 1999, 2000, 2001, 2005, 2006, 2007, 2008, 2009, 2012, 2014, 2015)
- Top CTRS ranking: 12th (2005–06)

Heather Strong (born November 9, 1976, in St. John's, Newfoundland) is a Canadian curler.

== Career ==
=== Juniors ===
Strong was 15 years old when she made her national debut at the 1992 Canadian Junior Curling Championships playing lead stones for Cheryl Cofield. The team had a difficult run at the event, finishing round robin with a 4–7 record.

Strong returned to the 1995 Canadian Junior Curling Championships, this time skipping her own team. She won only two games, finishing round robin in last place with a 2–9 record.

The following year Strong returned to the 1996 Canadian Juniors, this time coming out with a better record. The team finished round robin in a four-way tie for third. The team lost the tiebreaker to Saskatchewan's Cindy Street.

Strong's final junior appearance was at the 1997 Canadian Junior Curling Championships. Her sister Laura Strong joined the team at lead, however it was a disappointing event for Strong, only finishing round robin with a 5–7 record.

=== 1998–2001 ===
Strong made an easy transition from Juniors to Women's play. In 1998, Strong won her first provincial women's championship, which earned her the right to represent Newfoundland at the 1998 Scott Tournament of Hearts. She did not find success at the event, finishing 4–7 in round robin play.

In 1999 Strong was again provincial champion and represented Newfoundland and Labrador at the 1999 Scott Tournament of Hearts. There she improved upon her previous record, finishing round robin with a 5–6 record, just missing the playoffs.

In 2000, for a third year in a row, Strong returned to the National championship representing Newfoundland and Labrador. At the 2000 Scott Tournament of Hearts, Strong had another difficult time, finishing round robin with a 3–8 record.

In 2001, Strong reunited with her sister, and together represented Newfoundland and Labrador at the 2001 Scott Tournament of Hearts. This was Strong's fourth consecutive appearance at the event. Strong failed to make the playoffs, finishing round robin with a 4–7 record.

=== 2005–2009 ===
Strong did not qualify for another national championship until 2005, when her team represented Newfoundland and Labrador, in St. John's Newfoundland, their home province at the 2005 Scott Tournament of Hearts. This was Strong's worst showing to date. The team finished round robin with a last place record of 1–10.

In 2006 Strong again qualified for the Scott Tournament of Hearts, this time she finished round robin, tied for fourth place with a 7–4 record. She faced Quebec's Ève Bélisle in the tiebreaker game, but came up short, losing the match 8–2.

Strong made a third appearance in a row at the 2007 Scotties Tournament of Hearts. She again failed to qualify for the playoffs, finishing round robin with a 5–6 record.

In 2008, Strong made changes to her team. She added Cathy Cunningham and Peg Goss, two former rivals, to her lineup. The team again qualified for the 2008 Scotties Tournament of Hearts, Strong's fourth consecutive appearance. They finished round robin tied for fourth place, where they met Manitoba's Jennifer Jones in the tiebreaker match. The team lost the match 3–6, missing out on the playoffs.

2009 found Strong qualifying for her fifth consecutive trip to the Scotties Tournament of Hearts. Once again Strong found herself in the middle of the pack after round robin play, finishing with a 5–6 record.

=== 2010–2018 ===
At the 2010 Newfoundland and Labrador Scotties Tournament of Hearts, Strong was looking to capture her sixth consecutive title, but this was not to be. Strong lost the final to Shelley Nichols. Cunningham and Goss retired from competitive curling following the season.

In 2011, Strong added Cunningham's daughter, Jenn Cunningham, and Stephanie Korab to the team. At the 2011 Newfoundland and Labrador Scotties Tournament of Hearts Strong again made the playoffs, but lost the semi-final to Nichols.

At the 2012 Newfoundland and Labrador Scotties Tournament of Hearts Strong found success, finishing round robin in first place, and defeating Laura Phillips in the final. At the 2012 Scotties Tournament of Hearts, Strong had a disappointing run, finishing 4–7 in round robin play. After the season, Strong added Erica Trickett to her team, replacing Cunningham.

Strong lost in the final of the 2013 Newfoundland and Labrador Scotties Tournament of Hearts to Stacie Devereaux, but won the 2014 Newfoundland and Labrador Scotties Tournament of Hearts with new teammates Jessica Cunningham and Kathryn Cooper playing front-end. At the 2014 Scotties Tournament of Hearts, Strong led Newfoundland and Labrador to another 4–7 record.

In 2015, Laura Strong moved to Saskatchewan, and was replaced at third with Korab. Losing her sister did not prevent Heather from winning her 12th provincial title at the 2015 Newfoundland and Labrador Scotties Tournament of Hearts. At the 2015 Scotties Tournament of Hearts, Strong posted another 4–7 record.

=== 2020-Current ===
After taking a year off from curling, Strong reunited with her sister Laura. Their 2020 season was cut short due to the COVID-19 pandemic. Strong will play in the 2022 Newfoundland and Labrador Scotties Tournament of Hearts provincial championship, hoping to make her first return to the national stage since 2015.

== Personal life ==
Strong is the current Provincial Director of the Terry Fox Foundation and an avid curler and participated in two Canada Games in the sport of synchronized swimming.

== Grand Slam record ==
Key
C	Champion
F	Lost in Final
SF	Lost in Semifinal
QF	Lost in Quarterfinals
R16	Lost in the round of 16
Q	Did not advance to playoffs
T2	Played in Tier 2 event
DNP	Did not participate in event
N/A	Not a Grand Slam event that season

Event	2006–07	2007–08	2008–09	2009–10	2010–11	2011–12	2012–13	2013–14	2014–15
Masters	N/A	N/A	N/A	N/A	N/A	N/A	QF	DNP	DNP
Players'	DNP	Q	DNP	DNP	DNP	DNP	DNP	DNP	DNP

=== Former events ===
Event	2006–07	2007–08	2008–09	2009–10	2010–11	2011–12	2012–13	2013–14	2014–15
Sobeys Slam	N/A	Q	Q	N/A	Q	N/A	N/A	N/A	N/A
Manitoba Lotteries	Q	DNP	Q	Q	DNP	N/A	N/A	N/A	N/A
Colonial Square	N/A	N/A	N/A	N/A	N/A	N/A	DNP	DNP	Q
