= Lauren Wasylkiw =

Canadian curler

- Curler
- Born: June 26, 1990 (age 36); Stouffville, Ontario

Team
- Curling club: Unionville CC; Unionville, ON
- Skip: Katelyn Wasylkiw
- Third: Sarah Bailey
- Second: Stephanie Thompson
- Lead: Lauren Wasylkiw
- Mixed doubles partner: Shane Konings

Curling career
- Member Association: Ontario (2011–2012; 2016–present); Newfoundland and Labrador (2012–2016)
- Hearts: 2 (2013, 2016)
- Top CTRS ranking: 36th (2021–22)

Lauren Wasylkiw (/wəˈsɪlki/; born June 26, 1990) is a Canadian curler originally from Kleinburg, Ontario. She currently plays lead on her sister Katelyn's team. She was the second for Team Newfoundland and Labrador at the 2013 Scotties Tournament of Hearts.

== Career ==
=== Women's ===
Wasylkiw played second for the Brock Badgers, skipped by Courtney Hodgson, at the 2011 CIS/CCA Curling Championships. The team finished in second place, losing to the Wilfrid Laurier Golden Hawks, skipped by Laura Crocker. The following year, Wasylkiw returned as the second for the Brock Badgers at the 2012 CIS/CCA Curling Championships, this time skipped by Joanne Curtis. They lost in the final to Laura Crocker and the Wilfrid Laurier Golden Hawks for the second year in a row.

Wasylkiw won the 2013 Newfoundland and Labrador Scotties Tournament of Hearts as the second for Stacie Devereaux, qualifying for the 2013 Scotties Tournament of Hearts. There, they finished the round robin with a 2–9 record. That season, they also won the 2012 Curl Atlantic Championship. Wasylkiw returned to the Scotties Tournament of Hearts in 2016 as the alternate for Stacie Curtis. Wasylkiw, as the third for Katelyn Wasylkiw, went winless at the 2018 Ontario Scotties Tournament of Hearts. The team also won the 2019 Part II Bistro Ladies Classic on the World Curling Tour.

=== Mixed ===
In mixed curling, Wasylkiw competed at the 2016 Canadian Mixed Curling Championship as the lead for Team Newfoundland and Labrador, skipped by Chris Ford, finishing out of the playoffs with a 2–4 record.

=== Mixed doubles ===
In mixed doubles, Wasylkiw competed at the 2014 Canadian Mixed Doubles Curling Trials with partner Cory Ewart, finishing out of the playoffs with a 3–4 record. Wasylkiw won the 2020 Ontario Mixed Doubles Curling Championship with Shane Konings, but did not compete at the 2020 Canadian Mixed Doubles Curling Championship, as it was cancelled due to the COVID-19 pandemic. As the 2021 Ontario provincial playdowns were cancelled due to the COVID-19 pandemic in Ontario, Wasylkiw and Konings were selected to represent Ontario at the 2021 Canadian Mixed Doubles Curling Championship in Calgary. At the championship, the pair finished with a 2–4 record, defeating Kim Tuck / Wayne Tuck Jr. and Bayly Scoffin / Wade Scoffin. They qualified for the 2024 Canadian Mixed Doubles Curling Championship, where the pair finished with a 4-3 record.

== Personal life ==
Wasylkiw's sister is curler Katelyn Wasylkiw who skips her team. While curling out of Newfoundland, she lived in St. John's, Newfoundland and Labrador. While at Brock, she received a Bachelor of Arts degree in Recreation and Leisure Studies. Waslykiw is engaged to her mixed doubles partner, Shane Konings. She works as a recreation therapist. She lives in Stouffville.
