= Shelley Hardy =

Canadian curler (born 1982)

- Curler
- Born: Shelley Nichols; May 19, 1982 (age 44); Labrador City, Newfoundland and Labrador

Team
- Curling club: Arnprior CC, Arnprior, ON
- Skip: Shelley Hardy
- Third: Steph Mumford
- Second: Abby Deschene
- Lead: Stephanie Corrado

Curling career
- Member Association: Newfoundland and Labrador (2001–2022); Ontario (2022–present)
- Hearts: 4 (2006, 2007, 2010, 2017)
- Top CTRS ranking: 12th (2005-06)

Shelley Hardy (born May 19, 1982 in Labrador City, Newfoundland and Labrador as Shelley Nichols) is a Canadian curler originally from St. John's.

Hardy played third for Jennifer Guzzwell at the 2002 and 2003 Canadian Junior Curling Championships. The team lost the 2002 final to Suzanne Gaudet of Prince Edward Island. In 2003, they lost a tie breaker to make the playoffs.

In 2005, Hardy played third for her brother, 2006 Olympic gold medallist Mark Nichols at that year's Canadian Mixed Curling Championship in which the team won.

Hardy joined up with Heather Strong for the 2005-06 season, and won provincial championships as her third in 2006 and 2007. She left the team to skip her own in 2007. In 2010, she won her first provincial championship as a skip. Her win qualified her and her team of Stephanie LeDrew, Rhonda Rogers and Colette Lemon to represent the province at the 2010 Scotties Tournament of Hearts. There, she led her team to a 4–7 record.

After losing the provincial final to Stacie Curtis in 2017, Hardy was selected by the Curtis rink to be their alternate at the 2017 Scotties Tournament of Hearts. The team finished with a 5–6 record.

Hardy did not curl competitively again until the 2022–23 curling season, after moving to Ontario. She played in her first Ontario Scotties in 2023 playing third for Lauren Mann.

== Personal life ==
She is married to Jeremy Hardy and works for WestJet.

Hardy currently lives in Arnprior, Ontario.
