= St. John's Curling Club =

Curling club in St. John's, Newfoundland and Labrador, Canada

- Location: 135 Mayor Avenue; St. John's, Newfoundland and Labrador; A1A 5G6
- Arena: RE/MAX Centre

Information
- Established: 1910
- Club type: Dedicated Ice
- Curling Canada region: NLCA Eastern Region
- Sheets of ice: Six
- Rock colours: Blue and Yellow
- Website: http://www.stjohnscurlingclub.com/

The St. John's Curling Club (officially the St. John's Curling Association) is a curling club in St. John's, Newfoundland and Labrador, Canada. The club plays at the RE/MAX Centre in Central St. John's, on Mayor Ave. It is the largest curling club in the province.

== History ==
The club was founded on July 8, 1910, when the Terra Nova Curling Club and the Micmac Curling Club were amalgamated. From 1912 to 1941, the club was located at the Newfoundland Curling Rink Ltd. on Forest Road. The club bought a new rink in 1941, but it burned down before the season started. In 1943, the club moved to a rink on Factory Lane. In addition to curling, this rink also allowed for skating and dancing. The St. John's Ladies Curling Club was integrated in 1959. In 1976 the club moved to a new rink on Bonaventure Avenue, which was renamed RE/MAX Centre in 2006.

== Champions ==
The club is most notable for being the home of the 2006 Winter Olympic champion team of Brad Gushue, Mark Nichols, Russ Howard, Jamie Korab and Mike Adam. Gushue also represented Canada at the 2022 Winter Olympics with his new rink of Mark Nichols, Brett Gallant, and Geoff Walker, winning a bronze medal.

The first Newfoundland team to win the Brier, hailed from the St. John's Curling Club. The team of Jack MacDuff, Toby McDonald, Doug Hudson and Ken Templeton won the 1976 Macdonald Brier. Brad Gushue has also won 5 Briers while curling out of the St. John's Curling Club, and won the 2017 World Men's Curling Championship. As of 2024, teams from the St. John's Curling Club have won 49 Newfoundland and Labrador Tankards, the provincial men's championship.

The club has won two Canadian Junior Curling Championships. Brad Gushue and his rink of Mike Adam, Brent Hamilton and Mark Nichols won the men's title in 2001. The team went on to win a gold medal at the 2001 World Junior Curling Championships. Stacie Devereaux, Stephanie Guzzwell, Sarah Paul and Julie Devereaux won the women's 2007 Canadian Junior Curling Championships and won a silver medal for Canada at the 2007 World Junior Curling Championships. The club has also won one Canadian U18 Championship in 2024, with Simon Perry and his rink of Nicholas Codner, Brayden Snow, and Carter Holden.

While curling out of the club, Mark Nichols, Shelley Nichols, Brent Hamilton and Jennifer Guzzwell won the 2005 Canadian Mixed Curling Championship, the only time the province has won a Canadian Mixed title.

Finally, the club won its first Travelers Curling Club Championship in 2015, when Andrew Symonds, Mark Healy, Cory Ewart and Keith Jewer won the men's title.
