= 2023 Players Open =

2023 Insitu Players Open
- Host city: Dundas, Ontario
- Arena: Dundas Granite Curling Club & Dundas Valley Golf & Curling Club
- Dates: October 12–15
- Men's winner: (Alberta) Team Bottcher
- Curling club: The Glencoe Club, Calgary
- Skip: Brendan Bottcher
- Third: Marc Kennedy
- Second: Brett Gallant
- Lead: Ben Hebert
- Coach: Paul Webster
- Finalist: (Alberta) Kevin Koe
- Women's winner: (Sweden) Team Hasselborg
- Curling club: Sundbybergs CK, Sundbyberg
- Skip: Anna Hasselborg
- Third: Sara McManus
- Second: Agnes Knochenhauer
- Lead: Sofia Mabergs
- Coach: Kristian Lindström
- Finalist: (Sweden) Isabella Wranå

The 2023 Insitu Players Open was held from October 12 to 15 at the Dundas Granite Curling Club and the Dundas Valley Golf & Curling Club in Dundas, Ontario. The event was held in a round-robin format with a $70,000 purse on both the men's and women's side. It was the first event held as part of the Players Tour during the 2023–24 season.

The inaugural Players Open attracted a high calibre field of both national and international teams as it was held the weekend before the 2023 Tour Challenge in Niagara Falls.

The Dirty Nil played in concert on the first night of the event.

In the men's final, it was a battle of Alberta, with Team Brendan Bottcher defeating the Kevin Koe rink 5–4. The win put Bottcher in first place on the World Curling Rankings. The women's final was a battle of Sweden, with Anna Hasselborg's team defeating the Isabella Wranå rink 9–3, avenging her loss to Wranå at the Swedish European Championship playdowns the previous month.

== Men ==
=== Teams ===
The teams are listed as follows:

Skip	Third	Second	Lead	Alternate	Locale
Brendan Bottcher	Marc Kennedy	Brett Gallant	Ben Hebert		Calgary, Alberta
Cameron Bryce	Duncan Menzies	Luke Carson	Robin McCall		Border, Scotland
Niklas Edin	Oskar Eriksson	Rasmus Wranå	Christoffer Sundgren		Karlstad, Sweden
John Epping	Mat Camm	Pat Janssen	Jason Camm		Toronto, Ontario
Wouter Gösgens	Laurens Hoekman	Jaap van Dorp	Tobias van den Hurk	Alexander Magan	Zoetermeer, Netherlands
Daniel Hocevar	Kevin Genjaga	Joel Matthews	Jarrett Matthews		Toronto, Ontario
Marco Hösli	Philipp Hösli	Simon Gloor	Justin Hausherr		Glarus, Switzerland
Jeong Byeong-jin	Kim Min-woo	Lee Jeong-jae	Kim Tae-hwan		Seoul, South Korea
Mark Kean	Brady Lumley	Matthew Garner	Spencer Dunlop		Woodstock, Ontario
Kevin Koe	Tyler Tardi	Jacques Gauthier	Karrick Martin		Calgary, Alberta
Mike McEwen	Colton Flasch	Kevin Marsh	Dan Marsh		Saskatoon, Saskatchewan
Jean-Michel Ménard	Martin Crête	Jesse Mullen	Philippe Brassard		Montreal, Quebec
Sam Mooibroek	Scott Mitchell	Nathan Steele	Colin Schnurr	Wyatt Small	Whitby, Ontario
Yusuke Morozumi	Yuta Matsumura	Ryotaro Shukuya	Masaki Iwai	Kosuke Morozumi	Karuizawa, Japan
Bruce Mouat	Grant Hardie	Bobby Lammie	Hammy McMillan Jr.		Stirling, Scotland
Park Jong-duk	Jeong Yeong-seok	Oh Seung-hoon	Seong Ji-hoon	Lee Ki-bok	Gangwon, South Korea
Magnus Ramsfjell	Martin Sesaker	Bendik Ramsfjell	Gaute Nepstad		Trondheim, Norway
Joël Retornaz	Amos Mosaner	Sebastiano Arman	Mattia Giovanella		Trentino, Italy
Catlin Schneider	Sterling Middleton	Jason Ginter	Alex Horvath		Victoria, British Columbia
Benoît Schwarz-van Berkel (Fourth)	Yannick Schwaller (Skip)	Sven Michel	Pablo Lachat		Geneva, Switzerland
Kyle Waddell	Craig Waddell	Mark Taylor	Gavin Barr		Hamilton, Scotland
Ross Whyte	Robin Brydone	Duncan McFadzean	Euan Kyle		Stirling, Scotland
Wyatt Wright	Liam Tardif	Isaac Racz	Owen Nicholls		Toronto, Ontario
Riku Yanagisawa	Tsuyoshi Yamaguchi	Takeru Yamamoto	Satoshi Koizumi		Karuizawa, Japan

=== Round robin standings ===
Final Round Robin Standings

Key
Teams to Playoffs
Teams to Tiebreaker

Pool A	W	L	PF	PA
(Netherlands) Wouter Gösgens	5	0	34	19
(Norway) Magnus Ramsfjell	4	1	21	19
(British Columbia) Catlin Schneider	2	3	33	28
(Quebec) Jean-Michel Ménard	2	3	26	24
(Scotland) Bruce Mouat	2	3	18	27
(Ontario) Wyatt Wright	0	5	7	22

Pool B	W	L	PF	PA
(Alberta) Kevin Koe	5	0	36	23
(Alberta) Brendan Bottcher	4	1	24	18
(Japan) Riku Yanagisawa	2	3	26	27
(Japan) Yusuke Morozumi	2	3	25	26
(Ontario) Sam Mooibroek	2	3	22	26
(Ontario) Daniel Hocevar	0	5	19	32

Pool C	W	L	PF	PA
(Italy) Joël Retornaz	5	0	35	21
(Ontario) John Epping	3	2	30	24
(Ontario) Mark Kean	2	3	24	25
(Scotland) Cameron Bryce	2	3	26	28
(Scotland) Ross Whyte	2	3	30	32
(South Korea) Jeong Byeong-jin	1	4	21	36

Pool D	W	L	PF	PA
(Scotland) Kyle Waddell	4	1	26	24
(Switzerland) Yannick Schwaller	3	2	31	24
(Switzerland) Marco Hösli	3	2	28	28
(Sweden) Niklas Edin	3	2	27	17
(Saskatchewan) Mike McEwen	2	3	24	29
(South Korea) Park Jong-duk	0	5	19	33

=== Round robin results ===
All draw times are listed in Eastern Time (UTC−04:00).
Note: Sheets G 1 through 4 are at the Dundas Granite Curling Club. Sheets V5 is at the Dundas Valley Golf & Curling Club.

==== Draw 1 ====
Thursday, October 12, 8:00 am

Sheet G1	1	2	3	4	5	6	7	8	Final
(Netherlands) Wouter Gösgens	0	0	1	0	4	0	0	1	6
(British Columbia) Catlin Schneider	0	1	0	1	0	1	1	0	4

Sheet G2	1	2	3	4	5	6	7	8	9	Final
(Scotland) Bruce Mouat	1	0	0	0	2	0	1	0	2	6
(Quebec) Jean-Michel Ménard	0	0	0	1	0	1	0	2	0	4

Sheet G3	Final
(Norway) Magnus Ramsfjell	W
(Ontario) Wyatt Wright	L

Sheet G4	1	2	3	4	5	6	7	8	9	Final
(Alberta) Kevin Koe	2	0	0	2	0	0	2	0	1	7
(Ontario) Sam Mooibroek	0	1	3	0	1	0	0	1	0	6

Sheet V5	1	2	3	4	5	6	7	8	Final
(Ontario) John Epping	3	0	3	0	2	X	X	X	8
(South Korea) Jeong Byeong-jin	0	2	0	1	0	X	X	X	3

==== Draw 2 ====
Thursday, October 12, 11:15 am

Sheet G1	1	2	3	4	5	6	7	8	Final
(Alberta) Brendan Bottcher	1	1	0	0	2	0	0	1	5
(Ontario) Daniel Hocevar	0	0	0	1	0	1	1	0	3

Sheet G2	1	2	3	4	5	6	7	8	9	Final
(Japan) Yusuke Morozumi	0	1	0	0	3	0	0	0	0	4
(Japan) Riku Yanagisawa	0	0	0	1	0	2	0	1	1	5

Sheet G3	1	2	3	4	5	6	7	8	Final
(Italy) Joël Retornaz	0	2	0	0	1	2	0	1	6
(Scotland) Ross Whyte	1	0	2	0	0	0	0	0	3

Sheet G4	1	2	3	4	5	6	7	8	Final
(Scotland) Cameron Bryce	0	1	0	1	0	1	0	X	3
(Ontario) Mark Kean	1	0	2	0	2	0	2	X	7

Sheet V5	1	2	3	4	5	6	7	8	Final
(Sweden) Niklas Edin	0	3	0	2	0	0	3	X	8
(Switzerland) Yannick Schwaller	1	0	1	0	0	0	0	X	2

==== Draw 3 ====
Thursday, October 12, 2:30 pm

Sheet G1	1	2	3	4	5	6	7	8	Final
(Saskatchewan) Mike McEwen	2	0	1	0	2	0	1	X	7
(South Korea) Park Jong-duk	0	2	0	0	0	2	0	X	4

Sheet G2	1	2	3	4	5	6	7	8	Final
(Switzerland) Marco Hösli	0	1	0	1	0	1	0	1	4
(Scotland) Kyle Waddell	0	0	2	0	2	0	1	0	5

Sheet G3	1	2	3	4	5	6	7	8	Final
(Netherlands) Wouter Gösgens	3	0	0	2	0	1	0	1	7
(Quebec) Jean-Michel Ménard	0	1	2	0	1	0	1	0	5

Sheet G4	Final
(Scotland) Bruce Mouat	W
(Ontario) Wyatt Wright	L

Sheet V5	1	2	3	4	5	6	7	8	Final
(Norway) Magnus Ramsfjell	3	0	2	0	0	0	3	0	8
(British Columbia) Catlin Schneider	0	2	0	3	0	0	0	2	7

==== Draw 4 ====
Thursday, October 12, 5:45 pm

Sheet G1	1	2	3	4	5	6	7	8	Final
(Scotland) Ross Whyte	2	1	0	0	3	0	0	2	8
(South Korea) Jeong Byeong-jin	0	0	1	1	0	2	2	0	6

Sheet G2	1	2	3	4	5	6	7	8	Final
(Scotland) Cameron Bryce	0	0	0	2	0	X	X	X	2
(Ontario) John Epping	2	1	2	0	2	X	X	X	7

Sheet G3	1	2	3	4	5	6	7	8	Final
(Ontario) Sam Mooibroek	0	1	0	2	1	0	1	0	5
(Japan) Yusuke Morozumi	1	0	3	0	0	1	0	1	6

Sheet G4	1	2	3	4	5	6	7	8	Final
(Alberta) Brendan Bottcher	2	0	0	1	0	1	0	X	4
(Alberta) Kevin Koe	0	0	3	0	2	0	4	X	9

Sheet V5	1	2	3	4	5	6	7	8	9	Final
(Japan) Riku Yanagisawa	0	1	0	4	0	1	1	0	1	8
(Ontario) Daniel Hocevar	2	0	3	0	1	0	0	1	0	7

==== Draw 6 ====
Friday, October 13, 8:00 am

Sheet G1	1	2	3	4	5	6	7	8	Final
(Italy) Joël Retornaz	0	2	0	1	0	2	0	X	5
(Ontario) Mark Kean	1	0	0	0	2	0	0	X	3

Sheet G2	1	2	3	4	5	6	7	8	Final
(Saskatchewan) Mike McEwen	3	0	3	0	0	0	1	0	7
(Switzerland) Marco Hösli	0	2	0	1	2	1	0	2	8

Sheet G3	1	2	3	4	5	6	7	8	Final
(Switzerland) Yannick Schwaller	0	0	1	0	2	0	1	0	4
(Scotland) Kyle Waddell	0	1	0	1	0	3	0	1	6

Sheet G4	1	2	3	4	5	6	7	8	Final
(Sweden) Niklas Edin	1	0	0	3	0	2	1	X	7
(South Korea) Park Jong-duk	0	1	0	0	2	0	0	X	3

Sheet V5	1	2	3	4	5	6	7	8	Final
(Ontario) Wyatt Wright	0	0	1	0	0	1	0	X	2
(Quebec) Jean-Michel Ménard	1	1	0	0	5	0	1	X	8

==== Draw 7 ====
Friday, October 13, 11:15 am

Sheet G1	1	2	3	4	5	6	7	8	Final
(Alberta) Kevin Koe	0	1	0	2	0	2	0	2	7
(Japan) Riku Yanagisawa	2	0	2	0	1	0	1	0	6

Sheet G2	1	2	3	4	5	6	7	8	Final
(Norway) Magnus Ramsfjell	0	1	0	1	0	X	X	X	2
(Netherlands) Wouter Gösgens	4	0	1	0	3	X	X	X	8

Sheet G3	1	2	3	4	5	6	7	8	Final
(Scotland) Bruce Mouat	0	2	0	2	0	0	X	X	4
(British Columbia) Catlin Schneider	4	0	2	0	1	4	X	X	11

Sheet G4	1	2	3	4	5	6	7	8	Final
(Japan) Yusuke Morozumi	1	1	0	2	0	1	1	1	7
(Ontario) Daniel Hocevar	0	0	2	0	1	0	0	0	3

==== Draw 8 ====
Friday, October 13, 2:30 pm

Sheet G1	1	2	3	4	5	6	7	8	Final
(Sweden) Niklas Edin	2	0	1	0	0	1	0	X	4
(Scotland) Kyle Waddell	0	2	0	0	3	0	1	X	6

Sheet G2	1	2	3	4	5	6	7	8	Final
(Alberta) Brendan Bottcher	0	1	0	1	1	2	X	X	5
(Ontario) Sam Mooibroek	0	0	0	0	0	0	X	X	0

Sheet G3	1	2	3	4	5	6	7	8	Final
(Ontario) John Epping	0	0	0	1	2	1	1	X	5
(Ontario) Mark Kean	0	1	0	0	0	0	0	X	1

Sheet G4	1	2	3	4	5	6	7	8	Final
(Scotland) Ross Whyte	0	2	0	1	0	0	X	X	3
(Scotland) Cameron Bryce	2	0	3	0	3	1	X	X	9

==== Draw 9 ====
Friday, October 13, 5:45 pm

Sheet G1	1	2	3	4	5	6	7	8	Final
(Switzerland) Yannick Schwaller	3	0	0	3	1	X	X	X	7
(Saskatchewan) Mike McEwen	0	0	1	0	0	X	X	X	1

Sheet G2	1	2	3	4	5	6	7	8	Final
(Italy) Joël Retornaz	2	0	0	2	0	3	0	X	7
(South Korea) Jeong Byeong-jin	0	1	0	0	2	0	1	X	4

Sheet G3	1	2	3	4	5	6	7	8	Final
(Switzerland) Marco Hösli	0	1	1	0	3	1	0	X	6
(South Korea) Park Jong-duk	0	0	0	3	0	0	1	X	4

Sheet G4	1	2	3	4	5	6	7	8	Final
(Scotland) Bruce Mouat	0	0	1	0	0	1	0	2	4
(Norway) Magnus Ramsfjell	0	1	0	1	0	0	3	0	5

==== Draw 10 ====
Friday, October 13, 9:00 pm

Sheet G1	1	2	3	4	5	6	7	8	Final
(Alberta) Brendan Bottcher	1	0	3	1	1	0	X	X	6
(Japan) Yusuke Morozumi	0	1	0	0	0	2	X	X	3

Sheet G2	1	2	3	4	5	6	7	8	Final
(Netherlands) Wouter Gösgens	0	1	1	0	3	1	0	X	6
(Ontario) Wyatt Wright	1	0	0	2	0	0	1	X	4

Sheet G3	1	2	3	4	5	6	7	8	Final
(Quebec) Jean-Michel Ménard	1	0	2	0	4	2	X	X	9
(British Columbia) Catlin Schneider	0	2	0	1	0	0	X	X	3

Sheet G4	1	2	3	4	5	6	7	8	9	Final
(Japan) Riku Yanagisawa	0	1	0	0	2	0	0	1	0	4
(Ontario) Sam Mooibroek	0	0	1	0	0	3	0	0	1	5

==== Draw 11 ====
Saturday, October 14, 8:00 am

Sheet G1	1	2	3	4	5	6	7	8	Final
(Alberta) Kevin Koe	2	1	0	1	2	0	X	X	6
(Ontario) Daniel Hocevar	0	0	0	0	0	2	X	X	2

Sheet G2	1	2	3	4	5	6	7	8	Final
(Saskatchewan) Mike McEwen	3	0	1	2	0	0	3	X	9
(Scotland) Kyle Waddell	0	2	0	0	1	1	0	X	4

Sheet G3	1	2	3	4	5	6	7	8	Final
(Scotland) Cameron Bryce	3	1	2	0	2	X	X	X	8
(South Korea) Jeong Byeong-jin	0	0	0	2	0	X	X	X	2

Sheet G4	1	2	3	4	5	6	7	8	Final
(Italy) Joël Retornaz	0	2	0	1	0	2	0	3	8
(Ontario) John Epping	2	0	1	0	2	0	2	0	7

Sheet V5	1	2	3	4	5	6	7	8	9	Final
(Ontario) Mark Kean	0	0	2	0	0	3	1	0	2	8
(Scotland) Ross Whyte	2	1	0	0	1	0	0	2	0	6

==== Draw 12 ====
Saturday, October 14, 11:15 am

Sheet G1	1	2	3	4	5	6	7	8	Final
(Ontario) Wyatt Wright	0	0	1	0	X	X	X	X	1
(British Columbia) Catlin Schneider	0	4	0	4	X	X	X	X	8

Sheet G2	1	2	3	4	5	6	7	8	Final
(Scotland) Bruce Mouat	1	0	0	0	1	2	0	0	4
(Netherlands) Wouter Gösgens	0	2	1	1	0	0	1	2	7

Sheet G3	1	2	3	4	5	6	7	8	Final
(Sweden) Niklas Edin	0	0	0	1	1	0	0	X	2
(Switzerland) Marco Hösli	1	1	1	0	0	1	2	X	6

Sheet G4	1	2	3	4	5	6	7	8	Final
(Switzerland) Yannick Schwaller	0	2	1	1	0	2	2	X	8
(South Korea) Park Jong-duk	4	0	0	0	1	0	0	X	5

==== Draw 13 ====
Saturday, October 14, 2:30 pm

Sheet G1	1	2	3	4	5	6	7	8	Final
(Italy) Joël Retornaz	2	0	3	2	0	2	X	X	9
(Scotland) Cameron Bryce	0	3	0	0	1	0	X	X	4

Sheet G2	1	2	3	4	5	6	7	8	Final
(Ontario) Mark Kean	0	1	0	1	0	1	0	2	5
(South Korea) Jeong Byeong-jin	2	0	2	0	1	0	1	0	6

Sheet G3	1	2	3	4	5	6	7	8	Final
(Quebec) Jean-Michel Ménard	0	0	0	0	0	0	X	X	0
(Norway) Magnus Ramsfjell	0	0	0	1	4	1	X	X	6

Sheet G4	1	2	3	4	5	6	7	8	Final
(Ontario) Sam Mooibroek	3	0	0	1	0	2	0	X	6
(Ontario) Daniel Hocevar	0	1	1	0	1	0	1	X	4

Sheet V5	1	2	3	4	5	6	7	8	Final
(Alberta) Kevin Koe	2	0	1	0	1	0	2	1	7
(Japan) Yusuke Morozumi	0	2	0	2	0	1	0	0	5

==== Draw 14 ====
Saturday, October 14, 5:45 pm

Sheet G1	1	2	3	4	5	6	7	8	Final
(Switzerland) Yannick Schwaller	1	0	2	2	0	3	2	X	10
(Switzerland) Marco Hösli	0	3	0	0	1	0	0	X	4

Sheet G2	1	2	3	4	5	6	7	8	Final
(Scotland) Ross Whyte	2	0	4	0	4	X	X	X	10
(Ontario) John Epping	0	1	0	2	0	X	X	X	3

Sheet G3	1	2	3	4	5	6	7	8	Final
(Alberta) Brendan Bottcher	1	0	0	1	0	1	0	1	4
(Japan) Riku Yanagisawa	0	1	0	0	0	0	2	0	3

Sheet G4	1	2	3	4	5	6	7	8	Final
(Sweden) Niklas Edin	2	1	0	2	1	X	X	X	6
(Saskatchewan) Mike McEwen	0	0	0	0	0	X	X	X	0

Sheet V5	1	2	3	4	5	6	7	8	Final
(Scotland) Kyle Waddell	0	0	2	0	0	0	2	1	5
(South Korea) Park Jong-duk	1	0	0	1	0	1	0	0	3

=== Tiebreaker ===
Saturday, October 14, 9:00 pm

Team	1	2	3	4	5	6	7	8	Final
(Switzerland) Yannick Schwaller	0	1	1	0	0	2	1	X	5
(Switzerland) Marco Hösli	0	0	0	0	1	0	0	X	1

=== Playoffs ===
Quarterfinals
1	(Italy) Joël Retornaz	2
8	(Ontario) John Epping	5
4	(Norway) Magnus Ramsfjell	2
5	(Alberta) Brendan Bottcher	5
2	(Alberta) Kevin Koe	5
7	(Scotland) Kyle Waddell	3
3	(Netherlands) Wouter Gösgens	3
6	(Switzerland) Yannick Schwaller	5

Semifinals
8	(Ontario) John Epping	2
5	(Alberta) Brendan Bottcher	7
2	(Alberta) Kevin Koe	3
6	(Switzerland) Yannick Schwaller	2

Final
5	(Alberta) Brendan Bottcher	5
2	(Alberta) Kevin Koe	4

==== Quarterfinals ====
Sunday, October 15, 9:30 am

Team	1	2	3	4	5	6	7	8	Final
(Italy) Joël Retornaz	0	0	1	0	0	0	1	0	2
(Ontario) John Epping	0	1	0	0	1	1	0	2	5

Team	1	2	3	4	5	6	7	8	Final
(Norway) Magnus Ramsfjell	0	0	1	0	1	0	0	X	2
(Alberta) Brendan Bottcher	0	2	0	1	0	1	1	X	5

Team	1	2	3	4	5	6	7	8	Final
(Alberta) Kevin Koe	1	0	0	2	0	1	0	1	5
(Scotland) Kyle Waddell	0	2	0	0	1	0	0	0	3

Team	1	2	3	4	5	6	7	8	Final
(Netherlands) Wouter Gösgens	0	1	0	0	0	2	0	X	3
(Switzerland) Yannick Schwaller	0	0	2	0	1	0	2	X	5

==== Semifinals ====
Sunday, October 15, 1:00 pm

Team	1	2	3	4	5	6	7	8	Final
(Ontario) John Epping	0	0	1	0	1	0	0	X	2
(Alberta) Brendan Bottcher	3	1	0	1	0	1	1	X	7

Team	1	2	3	4	5	6	7	8	Final
(Alberta) Kevin Koe	0	1	0	0	0	0	0	2	3
(Switzerland) Yannick Schwaller	0	0	0	1	0	0	1	0	2

==== Final ====
Sunday, October 15, 4:00 pm

Team	1	2	3	4	5	6	7	8	Final
(Alberta) Brendan Bottcher	0	0	0	0	0	4	0	1	5
(Alberta) Kevin Koe	1	0	0	0	0	0	3	0	4

== Women ==
=== Teams ===
The teams are listed as follows:

Skip	Third	Second	Lead	Alternate	Locale
Hailey Armstrong	Jessica Humphries	Michaela Robert	Terri Weeks	Grace Cave	Ottawa, Ontario
Chelsea Brandwood	Megan Smith	Brenda Chapman	Keira McLaughlin		Niagara Falls, Ontario
Stefania Constantini	Marta Lo Deserto	Angela Romei	Giulia Zardini Lacedelli	Elena Mathis	Cortina d'Ampezzo, Italy
Hollie Duncan	Megan Balsdon	Rachelle Strybosch	Tess Guyatt		Woodstock, Ontario
Madeleine Dupont	Mathilde Halse	Denise Dupont	My Larsen	Jasmin Lander	Hvidovre, Denmark
Gim Eun-ji	Kim Min-ji	Kim Su-ji	Seol Ye-eun	Seol Ye-ji	Uijeongbu, South Korea
Clancy Grandy	Kayla MacMillan	Lindsay Dubue	Rachelle Brown (Note: Rachelle Brown spared for Sarah Loken.)		Vancouver, British Columbia
Ha Seung-youn	Kim Hye-rin	Yang Tae-i	Kim Su-jin		Chuncheon, South Korea
Shelley Hardy	Stephanie Mumford	Jessica Corrado	Stephanie Corrado		Sarnia, Ontario
Anna Hasselborg	Sara McManus	Agnes Knochenhauer	Sofia Mabergs		Sundbyberg, Sweden
Fay Henderson	Hailey Duff	Amy MacDonald	Katie McMillan		Stirling, Scotland
Corrie Hürlimann	Celine Schwizgebel	Sarah Müller	Marina Lörtscher	Briar Schwaller-Hürlimann	Zug, Switzerland
Danielle Inglis	Kira Brunton	Calissa Daly	Cassandra de Groot		Ottawa, Ontario
Michèle Jäggi	Robyn Silvernagle (Note: Robyn Silvernagle spared for Team Jäggi who only had three players.)	Stefanie Berset	Lisa Muhmenthaler		Bern, Switzerland
Jennifer Jones	Karlee Burgess	Emily Zacharias	Lauren Lenentine		Winnipeg, Manitoba
Kim Eun-jung	Kim Kyeong-ae	Kim Cho-hi	Kim Seon-yeong	Kim Yeong-mi	Gangneung, South Korea
Ikue Kitazawa	Seina Nakajima	Ami Enami	Minori Suzuki	Hasumi Ishigooka	Nagano, Japan
Isabelle Ladouceur	Grace Lloyd	Jamie Smith	Rachel Steele		Whitby, Ontario
Kaitlyn Lawes	Selena Njegovan	Jocelyn Peterman	Kristin MacCuish		Winnipeg, Manitoba
Rebecca Morrison	Jennifer Dodds	Sophie Sinclair	Sophie Jackson	Gina Aitken	Stirling, Scotland
Alina Pätz (Fourth)	Silvana Tirinzoni (Skip)	Selina Witschonke	Carole Howald		Aarau, Switzerland
Katelyn Wasylkiw	Lauren Wasylkiw	Stephanie Thompson	Alice Holyoke		Milton, Ontario
Isabella Wranå	Almida de Val	Maria Larsson	Linda Stenlund		Sundbyberg, Sweden
Yuna Kotani (Note: As skip Sayaka Yoshimura was on maternity leave, the rest of the team moved up the lineup a position.)	Kaho Onodera	Anna Ohmiya	Mina Kobayashi		Sapporo, Japan

=== Round robin standings ===
Final Round Robin Standings

Key
Teams to Playoffs
Teams to Tiebreakers

Pool A	W	L	PF	PA
(Scotland) Rebecca Morrison	5	0	28	19
(Denmark) Madeleine Dupont	3	2	30	25
(Switzerland) Silvana Tirinzoni	3	2	26	21
(South Korea) Ha Seung-youn	2	3	22	24
(Ontario) Danielle Inglis	1	4	17	25
(Ontario) Katelyn Wasylkiw	1	4	25	34

Pool B	W	L	PF	PA
(Italy) Stefania Constantini	4	1	29	13
(South Korea) Gim Eun-ji	4	1	27	20
(Switzerland) Michèle Jäggi	4	1	30	13
(British Columbia) Clancy Grandy	1	4	19	25
(Ontario) Chelsea Brandwood	1	4	17	31
(Ontario) Isabelle Ladouceur	1	4	13	33

Pool C	W	L	PF	PA
(South Korea) Kim Eun-jung	4	1	36	23
(Manitoba) Kaitlyn Lawes	3	2	33	25
(Manitoba) Jennifer Jones	3	2	29	22
(Ontario) Hollie Duncan	3	2	25	29
(Switzerland) Corrie Hürlimann	2	3	26	37
(Scotland) Fay Henderson	0	5	20	33

Pool D	W	L	PF	PA
(Sweden) Anna Hasselborg	4	1	30	16
(Japan) Team Yoshimura	3	2	25	19
(Sweden) Isabella Wranå	3	2	31	27
(Ontario) Shelley Hardy	2	3	22	35
(Japan) Ikue Kitazawa	2	3	27	25
(Ontario) Hailey Armstrong	1	4	19	32

=== Round robin results ===
All draw times are listed in Eastern Time (UTC−04:00).
Note: Sheets V 1 through 5 are at the Dundas Valley Golf & Curling Club.

==== Draw 1 ====
Thursday, October 12, 8:00 am

Sheet V1	1	2	3	4	5	6	7	8	9	Final
(Ontario) Shelley Hardy	0	0	1	2	1	0	1	0	1	6
(Ontario) Hailey Armstrong	0	1	0	0	0	2	0	2	0	5

Sheet V2	1	2	3	4	5	6	7	8	Final
(Japan) Team Yoshimura	1	0	1	0	1	0	0	X	3
(Sweden) Anna Hasselborg	0	2	0	2	0	1	1	X	6

Sheet V3	1	2	3	4	5	6	7	8	Final
(Manitoba) Kaitlyn Lawes	0	0	1	0	1	0	3	0	5
(South Korea) Kim Eun-jung	0	2	0	3	0	1	0	1	7

Sheet V4	1	2	3	4	5	6	7	8	Final
(Sweden) Isabella Wranå	1	0	1	0	3	2	0	1	8
(Japan) Ikue Kitazawa	0	2	0	3	0	0	2	0	7

==== Draw 2 ====
Thursday, October 12, 11:15 am

Sheet V1	1	2	3	4	5	6	7	8	Final
(Manitoba) Jennifer Jones	0	0	1	0	1	0	2	X	4
(Switzerland) Corrie Hürlimann	0	2	0	2	0	1	0	X	5

Sheet V2	1	2	3	4	5	6	7	8	Final
(Switzerland) Michèle Jäggi	2	0	0	2	1	2	X	X	7
(Ontario) Chelsea Brandwood	0	2	0	0	0	0	X	X	2

Sheet V3	1	2	3	4	5	6	7	8	Final
(South Korea) Gim Eun-ji	2	1	0	2	0	1	0	X	6
(Italy) Stefania Constantini	0	0	1	0	1	0	3	X	5

Sheet V4	1	2	3	4	5	6	7	8	Final
(British Columbia) Clancy Grandy	0	0	2	0	2	4	X	X	8
(Ontario) Isabelle Ladouceur	0	1	0	1	0	0	X	X	2

==== Draw 3 ====
Thursday, October 12, 2:30 pm

Sheet V1	1	2	3	4	5	6	7	8	9	Final
(Switzerland) Silvana Tirinzoni	0	0	1	0	0	1	0	1	0	3
(Scotland) Rebecca Morrison	0	0	0	1	1	0	1	0	1	4

Sheet V2	1	2	3	4	5	6	7	8	Final
(Denmark) Madeleine Dupont	0	1	0	3	0	0	0	3	7
(Ontario) Katelyn Wasylkiw	0	0	3	0	1	1	1	0	6

Sheet V3	1	2	3	4	5	6	7	8	Final
(South Korea) Ha Seung-youn	0	1	0	0	2	0	0	1	4
(Ontario) Danielle Inglis	0	0	0	1	0	1	1	0	3

Sheet V4	1	2	3	4	5	6	7	8	Final
(Ontario) Hollie Duncan	2	0	2	0	1	0	0	1	6
(Scotland) Fay Henderson	0	1	0	1	0	1	1	0	4

==== Draw 4 ====
Thursday, October 12, 5:45 pm

Sheet V1	1	2	3	4	5	6	7	8	Final
(British Columbia) Clancy Grandy	0	2	0	1	1	0	1	0	5
(Ontario) Chelsea Brandwood	1	0	0	0	0	3	0	2	6

Sheet V2	1	2	3	4	5	6	7	8	Final
(Sweden) Anna Hasselborg	2	1	0	0	3	1	X	X	7
(Ontario) Hailey Armstrong	0	0	1	1	0	0	X	X	2

Sheet V3	1	2	3	4	5	6	7	8	Final
(Sweden) Isabella Wranå	0	0	1	0	1	0	0	1	3
(Japan) Team Yoshimura	0	1	0	2	0	1	1	0	5

Sheet V4	1	2	3	4	5	6	7	8	Final
(Manitoba) Jennifer Jones	1	0	0	3	1	0	3	X	8
(South Korea) Kim Eun-jung	0	1	1	0	0	1	0	X	3

==== Draw 5 ====
Thursday, October 12, 9:00 pm

Sheet V1	1	2	3	4	5	6	7	8	Final
(South Korea) Gim Eun-ji	1	0	1	0	1	2	0	X	5
(Ontario) Isabelle Ladouceur	0	2	0	0	0	0	0	X	2

Sheet V2	1	2	3	4	5	6	7	8	Final
(Scotland) Fay Henderson	1	0	1	1	0	1	0	X	4
(Manitoba) Kaitlyn Lawes	0	2	0	0	2	0	3	X	7

Sheet V3	1	2	3	4	5	6	7	8	Final
(Switzerland) Corrie Hürlimann	0	2	0	2	1	0	0	X	5
(Ontario) Hollie Duncan	1	0	3	0	0	3	1	X	8

Sheet V4	1	2	3	4	5	6	7	8	Final
(Ontario) Shelley Hardy	1	0	2	0	2	2	2	X	9
(Japan) Ikue Kitazawa	0	2	0	2	0	0	0	X	4

==== Draw 6 ====
Friday, October 13, 8:00 am

Sheet V1	1	2	3	4	5	6	7	8	9	Final
(Scotland) Rebecca Morrison	0	0	0	3	2	0	1	0	1	7
(South Korea) Ha Seung-youn	0	1	0	0	0	2	0	3	0	6

Sheet V2	1	2	3	4	5	6	7	8	Final
(Ontario) Danielle Inglis	0	1	0	1	0	4	0	1	7
(Ontario) Katelyn Wasylkiw	1	0	1	0	2	0	1	0	5

Sheet V3	1	2	3	4	5	6	7	8	Final
(Switzerland) Silvana Tirinzoni	0	2	0	2	0	0	X	X	4
(Denmark) Madeleine Dupont	1	0	6	0	1	3	X	X	11

Sheet V4	1	2	3	4	5	6	7	8	Final
(Japan) Team Yoshimura	0	1	1	0	1	0	2	0	5
(Ontario) Hailey Armstrong	0	0	0	1	0	2	0	3	6

==== Draw 7 ====
Friday, October 13, 11:15 am

Sheet V1	1	2	3	4	5	6	7	8	Final
(Sweden) Anna Hasselborg	0	0	1	0	0	2	0	0	3
(Japan) Ikue Kitazawa	1	0	0	1	1	0	2	1	6

Sheet V2	1	2	3	4	5	6	7	8	Final
(South Korea) Kim Eun-jung	0	2	0	2	0	2	0	0	6
(Scotland) Fay Henderson	0	0	1	0	1	0	1	1	4

Sheet V3	1	2	3	4	5	6	7	8	Final
(Manitoba) Jennifer Jones	2	0	1	0	1	0	3	X	7
(Ontario) Hollie Duncan	0	0	0	2	0	1	0	X	3

Sheet V4	1	2	3	4	5	6	7	8	Final
(Manitoba) Kaitlyn Lawes	2	1	0	2	0	4	X	X	9
(Switzerland) Corrie Hürlimann	0	0	2	0	2	0	X	X	4

Sheet V5	1	2	3	4	5	6	7	8	Final
(Sweden) Isabella Wranå	1	0	3	0	0	2	4	X	10
(Ontario) Shelley Hardy	0	2	0	1	1	0	0	X	4

==== Draw 8 ====
Friday, October 13, 2:30 pm

Sheet V1	1	2	3	4	5	6	7	8	Final
(Ontario) Isabelle Ladouceur	1	0	2	1	2	0	1	X	7
(Ontario) Chelsea Brandwood	0	1	0	0	0	2	0	X	3

Sheet V2	1	2	3	4	5	6	7	8	Final
(British Columbia) Clancy Grandy	0	0	0	0	X	X	X	X	0
(Italy) Stefania Constantini	2	1	0	4	X	X	X	X	7

Sheet V3	1	2	3	4	5	6	7	8	Final
(South Korea) Gim Eun-ji	0	1	0	1	0	0	0	X	2
(Switzerland) Michèle Jäggi	0	0	2	0	1	2	1	X	6

Sheet V4	1	2	3	4	5	6	7	8	Final
(Scotland) Rebecca Morrison	0	0	1	1	1	0	0	1	4
(Ontario) Danielle Inglis	0	0	0	0	0	3	0	0	3

Sheet V5	1	2	3	4	5	6	7	8	Final
(Denmark) Madeleine Dupont	0	1	0	0	2	0	1	X	4
(South Korea) Ha Seung-youn	2	0	1	2	0	1	0	X	6

==== Draw 9 ====
Friday, October 13, 5:45 pm

Sheet V1	1	2	3	4	5	6	7	8	Final
(Sweden) Isabella Wranå	0	0	2	1	1	0	0	3	7
(Ontario) Hailey Armstrong	2	1	0	0	0	1	1	0	5

Sheet V2	1	2	3	4	5	6	7	8	Final
(Japan) Ikue Kitazawa	1	0	1	0	1	0	0	0	3
(Japan) Team Yoshimura	0	1	0	1	0	0	1	1	4

Sheet V3	1	2	3	4	5	6	7	8	Final
(Sweden) Anna Hasselborg	3	0	2	2	1	X	X	X	8
(Ontario) Shelley Hardy	0	2	0	0	0	X	X	X	2

Sheet V4	1	2	3	4	5	6	7	8	Final
(Switzerland) Silvana Tirinzoni	2	0	2	0	3	0	1	X	8
(Ontario) Katelyn Wasylkiw	0	2	0	1	0	1	0	X	4

Sheet V5	1	2	3	4	5	6	7	8	Final
(South Korea) Kim Eun-jung	0	2	0	0	2	3	1	X	8
(Ontario) Hollie Duncan	0	0	1	1	0	0	0	X	2

==== Draw 10 ====
Friday, October 13, 9:00 pm

Sheet V1	1	2	3	4	5	6	7	8	Final
(Manitoba) Jennifer Jones	0	1	0	2	0	1	0	0	4
(Manitoba) Kaitlyn Lawes	0	0	1	0	3	0	0	3	7

Sheet V2	1	2	3	4	5	6	7	8	Final
(Ontario) Isabelle Ladouceur	0	0	1	0	1	0	X	X	2
(Switzerland) Michèle Jäggi	0	3	0	0	0	6	X	X	9

Sheet V3	1	2	3	4	5	6	7	8	Final
(Italy) Stefania Constantini	0	0	0	2	0	0	0	2	4
(Ontario) Chelsea Brandwood	0	1	0	0	1	1	0	0	3

Sheet V4	1	2	3	4	5	6	7	8	Final
(Switzerland) Corrie Hürlimann	2	0	0	4	2	0	X	X	8
(Scotland) Fay Henderson	0	1	2	0	0	1	X	X	4

==== Draw 11 ====
Saturday, October 14, 8:00 am

Sheet V1	1	2	3	4	5	6	7	8	Final
(Switzerland) Corrie Hürlimann	0	1	0	2	0	1	0	0	4
(South Korea) Kim Eun-jung	1	0	4	0	1	0	1	5	12

Sheet V2	1	2	3	4	5	6	7	8	Final
(Scotland) Rebecca Morrison	1	0	1	0	2	3	0	X	7
(Ontario) Katelyn Wasylkiw	0	1	0	2	0	0	1	X	4

Sheet V3	1	2	3	4	5	6	7	8	Final
(South Korea) Gim Eun-ji	2	0	2	0	0	0	0	2	6
(British Columbia) Clancy Grandy	0	2	0	0	0	1	1	0	4

Sheet V4	1	2	3	4	5	6	7	8	Final
(Ontario) Danielle Inglis	0	1	0	1	0	0	1	X	3
(Denmark) Madeleine Dupont	0	0	2	0	2	1	0	X	5

==== Draw 12 ====
Saturday, October 14, 11:15 am

Sheet V1	1	2	3	4	5	6	7	8	Final
(Japan) Ikue Kitazawa	2	1	0	1	1	0	2	X	7
(Ontario) Hailey Armstrong	0	0	0	0	0	1	0	X	1

Sheet V2	1	2	3	4	5	6	7	8	Final
(Manitoba) Jennifer Jones	1	0	1	0	0	3	1	X	6
(Scotland) Fay Henderson	0	1	0	2	1	0	0	X	4

Sheet V3	1	2	3	4	5	6	7	8	Final
(Switzerland) Silvana Tirinzoni	0	1	0	1	0	2	0	X	4
(South Korea) Ha Seung-youn	0	0	0	0	1	0	0	X	1

Sheet V4	1	2	3	4	5	6	7	8	Final
(Japan) Team Yoshimura	0	2	3	1	2	X	X	X	8
(Ontario) Shelley Hardy	1	0	0	0	0	X	X	X	1

Sheet V5	1	2	3	4	5	6	7	8	Final
(Italy) Stefania Constantini	0	1	0	0	1	1	0	2	5
(Switzerland) Michèle Jäggi	0	0	2	1	0	0	1	0	4

==== Draw 13 ====
Saturday, October 14, 2:30 pm

Sheet V1	1	2	3	4	5	6	7	8	Final
(Sweden) Isabella Wranå	0	0	1	0	1	0	1	X	3
(Sweden) Anna Hasselborg	2	1	0	1	0	2	0	X	6

Sheet V2	1	2	3	4	5	6	7	8	Final
(South Korea) Gim Eun-ji	0	3	0	1	1	0	3	X	8
(Ontario) Chelsea Brandwood	1	0	1	0	0	1	0	X	3

Sheet V3	1	2	3	4	5	6	7	8	9	Final
(Manitoba) Kaitlyn Lawes	0	0	2	2	0	1	0	0	0	5
(Ontario) Hollie Duncan	0	1	0	0	1	0	2	1	1	6

Sheet V4	1	2	3	4	5	6	7	8	Final
(Scotland) Rebecca Morrison	1	0	0	1	0	3	1	X	6
(Denmark) Madeleine Dupont	0	1	1	0	1	0	0	X	3

==== Draw 14 ====
Saturday, October 14, 5:45 pm

Sheet V1	1	2	3	4	5	6	7	8	Final
(Italy) Stefania Constantini	3	2	3	X	X	X	X	X	8
(Ontario) Isabelle Ladouceur	0	0	0	X	X	X	X	X	0

Sheet V2	1	2	3	4	5	6	7	8	Final
(Switzerland) Silvana Tirinzoni	2	0	1	2	2	X	X	X	7
(Ontario) Danielle Inglis	0	1	0	0	0	X	X	X	1

Sheet V3	1	2	3	4	5	6	7	8	Final
(South Korea) Ha Seung-youn	1	0	0	0	1	2	1	0	5
(Ontario) Katelyn Wasylkiw	0	1	1	3	0	0	0	1	6

Sheet V4	1	2	3	4	5	6	7	8	Final
(British Columbia) Clancy Grandy	0	1	1	0	0	0	0	0	2
(Switzerland) Michèle Jäggi	1	0	0	1	0	1	0	1	4

=== Tiebreakers ===
Saturday, October 14, 9:00 pm

Sheet V1	1	2	3	4	5	6	7	8	Final
(South Korea) Gim Eun-ji	1	0	0	3	0	0	0	X	4
(Switzerland) Michèle Jäggi	0	0	1	0	1	0	1	X	3

Sheet V2	1	2	3	4	5	6	7	8	Final
(Japan) Team Yoshimura	1	0	0	0	1	0	X	X	2
(Sweden) Isabella Wranå	0	2	1	1	0	3	X	X	7

Sheet V3	Final
(Denmark) Madeleine Dupont	L
(Switzerland) Silvana Tirinzoni	W

Sheet V4	1	2	3	4	5	6	7	8	Final
(Manitoba) Kaitlyn Lawes	2	1	0	0	1	0	0	1	5
(Manitoba) Jennifer Jones	0	0	0	2	0	1	1	0	4

=== Playoffs ===
Quarterfinals
1	(Scotland) Rebecca Morrison	4
8	(Manitoba) Kaitlyn Lawes	6
4	(Sweden) Anna Hasselborg	6
5	(South Korea) Gim Eun-ji	5
2	(Italy) Stefania Constantini	2
7	(Sweden) Isabella Wranå	5
3	(South Korea) Kim Eun-jung	6
6	(Switzerland) Silvana Tirinzoni	2

Semifinals
8	(Manitoba) Kaitlyn Lawes	5
4	(Sweden) Anna Hasselborg	8
7	(Sweden) Isabella Wranå	4
3	(South Korea) Kim Eun-jung	2

Final
4	(Sweden) Anna Hasselborg	9
7	(Sweden) Isabella Wranå	3

==== Quarterfinals ====
Sunday, October 15, 9:30 am

Sheet V1	1	2	3	4	5	6	7	8	Final
(South Korea) Kim Eun-jung	0	1	0	1	0	0	4	X	6
(Switzerland) Silvana Tirinzoni	0	0	1	0	1	0	0	X	2

Sheet V2	1	2	3	4	5	6	7	8	Final
(Sweden) Anna Hasselborg	0	2	0	2	1	0	0	1	6
(South Korea) Gim Eun-ji	1	0	0	0	0	3	1	0	5

Sheet V3	1	2	3	4	5	6	7	8	Final
(Scotland) Rebecca Morrison	0	1	0	0	1	0	2	0	4
(Manitoba) Kaitlyn Lawes	0	0	1	1	0	3	0	1	6

Sheet V4	1	2	3	4	5	6	7	8	Final
(Italy) Stefania Constantini	1	0	0	0	0	1	0	X	2
(Sweden) Isabella Wranå	0	1	0	1	1	0	2	X	5

==== Semifinals ====
Sunday, October 15, 1:00 pm

Sheet V2	1	2	3	4	5	6	7	8	Final
(Sweden) Isabella Wranå	0	0	1	2	1	0	0	X	4
(South Korea) Kim Eun-jung	1	0	0	0	0	0	1	X	2

Sheet V4	1	2	3	4	5	6	7	8	Final
(Manitoba) Kaitlyn Lawes	1	0	0	3	0	0	1	0	5
(Sweden) Anna Hasselborg	0	2	0	0	1	1	0	4	8

==== Final ====
Sunday, October 15, 4:00 pm

Sheet V4	1	2	3	4	5	6	7	8	Final
(Sweden) Anna Hasselborg	2	1	3	0	0	3	X	X	9
(Sweden) Isabella Wranå	0	0	0	2	1	0	X	X	3
