= Emma Miskew =

Canadian curler (born 1989)

- Curler
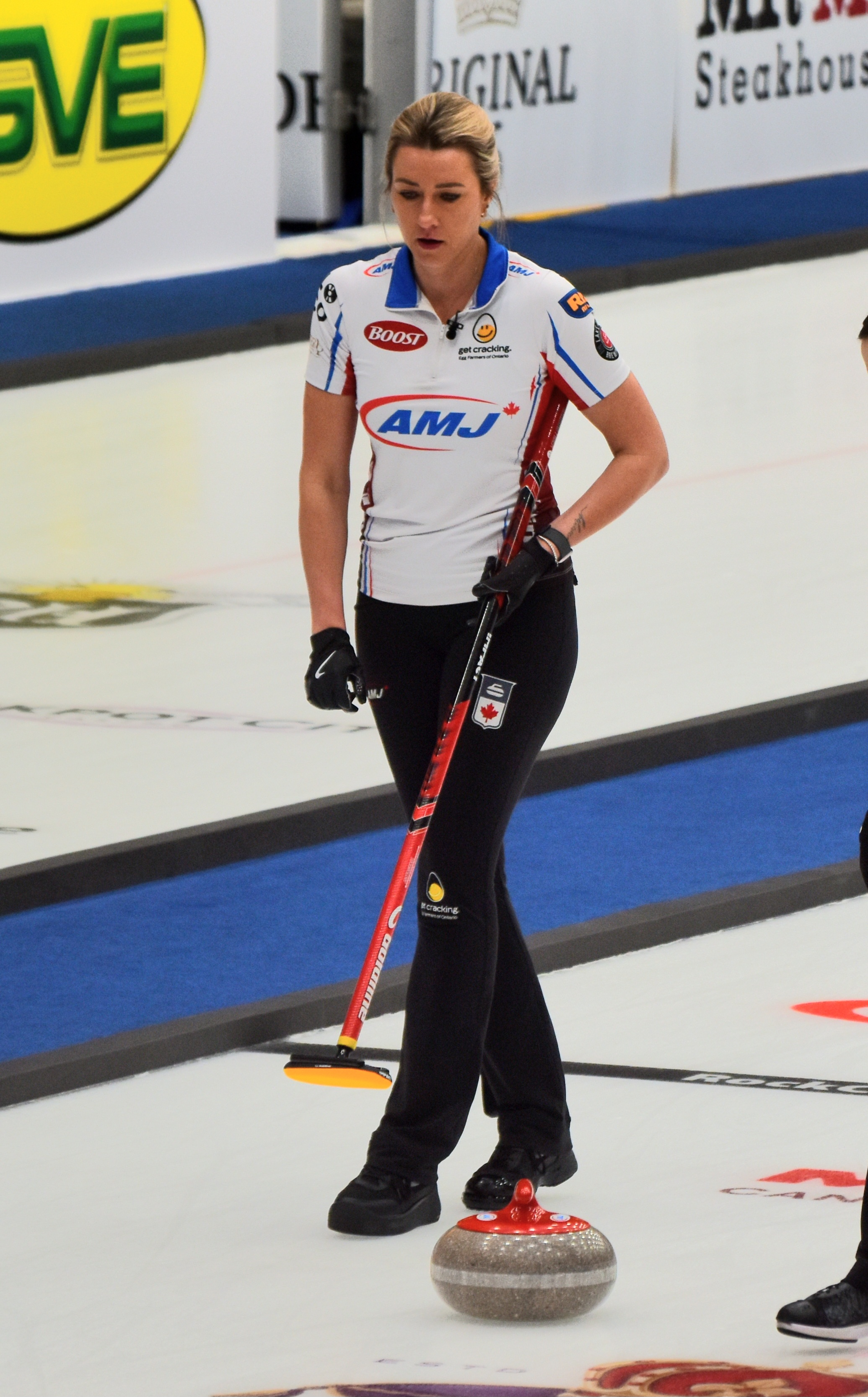
- Born: Emma Kathryn Miskew; February 14, 1989 (age 37); Ottawa, Ontario, Canada

Team
- Curling club: Ottawa CC; Ottawa, ON
- Skip: Rachel Homan
- Third: Tracy Fleury
- Second: Emma Miskew
- Lead: Sarah Wilkes
- Alternate: Rachelle Brown

Curling career
- Member Association: Ontario
- Hearts: 12 (2011, 2013, 2014, 2015, 2017, 2019, 2020, 2021, 2022, 2023, 2024, 2025)
- World Championship: 5 (2013, 2014, 2017, 2024, 2025)
- Pan Continental Championship: 2 (2024, 2025)
- Olympic: 2 (2018, 2026)
- Top CTRS ranking: 1st (2012–13, 2015–16, 2016–17, 2018–19, 2023–24, 2024–25, 2025–26)
- Grand Slam victories: 20 (2012 Masters, 2013 Masters, 2015 Masters, 2015 National, 2015 Canadian Open, 2017 Champions Cup, 2018 Champions Cup, 2018 Tour Challenge, 2018 National, 2019 Canadian Open, 2021 Champions Cup, 2022 Tour Challenge, 2023 Champions Cup, 2023 Masters, 2024 Canadian Open (Jan.), 2024 Canadian Open (Nov.), 2024 National, 2025 Masters (Sept.), 2025 Tour Challenge, 2025 GSOC Tahoe)
Medal record
Women's curling
Representing Canada
Olympic Games
Bronze medal – third place	2026 Milano Cortina	Team
World Curling Championships
Gold medal – first place	2017 Beijing
Gold medal – first place	2024 Sydney
Gold medal – first place	2025 Uijeongbu
Silver medal – second place	2014 Saint John
Bronze medal – third place	2013 Riga
World Junior Curling Championships
Silver medal – second place	2010 Flims
Pan Continental Curling Championships
Gold medal – first place	2024 Lacombe
Silver medal – second place	2025 Virginia
Scotties Tournament of Hearts
Gold medal – first place	2014 Montreal
Gold medal – first place	2025 Thunder Bay
Bronze medal – third place	2015 Moose Jaw
Representing Ontario
Canadian Olympic Curling Trials
Gold medal – first place	2017 Ottawa
Gold medal – first place	2025 Halifax
Bronze medal – third place	2013 Winnipeg
Scotties Tournament of Hearts
Gold medal – first place	2013 Kingston
Gold medal – first place	2017 St. Catharines
Gold medal – first place	2024 Calgary
Silver medal – second place	2019 Sydney
Silver medal – second place	2020 Moose Jaw
Silver medal – second place	2021 Calgary
Canadian Mixed Doubles Trials
Bronze medal – third place	2016 Saskatoon
Canada Winter Games
Gold medal – first place	2007 Whitehorse

Emma Kathryn Miskew (born February 14, 1989) is a Canadian curler. She is a three-time World and five-time Canadian champion curler as a member of the Rachel Homan rink. She was Homan's longtime third until 2022 when she moved to second, when Tracy Fleury was added to the team. In addition to their World and Canadian championships, the Homan team represented Canada at the 2018 and 2026 Winter Olympics. The team won the bronze medal in 2026 edition of the event.

== Career ==
=== Bantam and junior (2003–2010) ===
Miskew began curling at the age of five, playing in the Little Rock program at the Rideau Curling Club in Ottawa. After playing against each other as children, Miskew's father called Homan's father to put a team together when they were about 12 years old. Miskew has played with Homan ever since.

With Miskew playing third, the Homan team began her dominance in the sport when she was bantam aged, winning four straight provincial bantam championships from 2003 to 2006. She and Homan had won four championships while no other curler had won even twice. Their bantam rink qualified for the 2007 Canada Winter Games in Whitehorse, Yukon, where Team Ontario won to a gold medal.

Miskew's first two years at the junior level were somewhat disappointing, as her top-rated team failed to win a provincial championship. In 2007, her team lost the provincial final to Hollie Nicol's rink. In 2008, her team lost in the final to Danielle Inglis. However, these losses were allayed by a provincial junior championship in 2009, earning her team a berth at the 2009 Canadian Junior Curling Championships. At the Canadian Juniors, team Ontario was 10–2 after the round robin, giving her rink a bye to the final. However, she lost to the defending champion Kaitlyn Lawes rink from Manitoba in the final. The Homan rink won the 2010 provincial championship and went on to represent Ontario at the 2010 Canadian Junior Curling Championships. At the 2010 Canadian Junior Curling Championships, Miskew, with Rachel Homan, Laura Crocker, and Lynn Kreviazuk, won the Junior National Title in dramatic fashion by completing the event with an undefeated record of 13 wins and 0 losses – only the fourth women's team to do so. The team represented Canada at the 2010 World Junior Curling Championships in Flims, Switzerland. The team dominated the tournament, losing just their final round robin game. However, the team came up short in the final, losing to Sweden's Anna Hasselborg team.

Miskew's top accomplishments on the tour while still being so young included winning two straight Southwestern Ontario Women's Charity Cashspiels. In 2007, she defeated then-World Champion Jennifer Jones, and in 2008 she beat the Chinese national team, skipped by Wang Bingyu. Her team earned $11,000 for each win. In 2009, she won the AMJ Campbell Shorty Jenkins Classic, winning $5,500 for her team. Later that year, her team participated in the Canadian Olympic Curling Pre-Trials, where her team finished with a record of three wins and three losses, and therefore did not qualify for the "Roar of the Rings", Canada's Olympic Trials.

In 2009, her rink was named the World Curling Tour's "rookie team of the year."

Aside from the Homan team, Miskew also won the 2008 Junior provincial mixed title with Christian Tolusso.

=== Early women's (2010–2012) ===
The Homan rink qualified and won the 2011 Ontario Scotties Tournament of Hearts. At the 2011 Scotties Tournament of Hearts, Homan skipped the Ontario team to a 4th-place finish. They finished the round robin in 3rd place, and lost in the bronze medal game to Nova Scotia's Heather Smith-Dacey after previously beating her in the 3 vs. 4 game. A semi-final loss to Saskatchewan's Amber Holland eliminated her from the finals.

In April 2011, the Homan team made it to their first Grand Slam final, when she lost to Jennifer Jones in the final of the 2011 Players' Championship. Later that year they would play in her first Canada Cup where her team finished with a 2–4 record.

Miskew once again qualified for the provincial Scotties Tournament of Hearts in 2012. Her team went undefeated throughout the round robin. However, the team would be bested in the final by Tracy Horgan's rink from Sudbury. Rachel Homan, her skip, missed a draw to the button to clinch the victory on her final rock. Instead, she gave up three and lost.

=== Scotties champions and world bronze medallists (2012–2013) ===
The 2012–13 curling season was Miskew's most successful to date on the World Curling Tour. In her first Grand Slam event of the season, the 2012 Curlers Corner Autumn Gold Curling Classic, her team lost to Sherry Middaugh in the final. In the second Grand Slam event of the season, the 2012 Manitoba Lotteries Women's Curling Classic, the Homan rink once again lost in the final, this time to Stefanie Lawton. The team lost in the semi-final of the third Slam, the 2012 Colonial Square Ladies Classic but followed it up with their first ever Grand Slam victory at the 2012 Masters of Curling where she beat Chelsea Carey in the final. Outside of the Grand Slams, Miskew and her team won the 2nd Royal LePage OVCA Women's Fall Classic. Later in the season, they qualified for her second Scotties Tournament of Hearts by going undefeated at the 2013 Ontario Scotties Tournament of Hearts. The Homan rink tore through the competition representing Ontario at the 2013 Scotties Tournament of Hearts in Kingston, Ontario. The team lost just one game, to Manitoba's Jennifer Jones. This gave the rink a 10–1 record, 2nd behind Manitoba who went undefeated. However, in their first playoff game against Jones, the Homan rink made amends by defeating Jones 8–5. This put the Homan team in the final, where they faced Jones once again, and this time would beat them again, by a score of 9–6. With the win, the Homan rink becomes the first Ottawa-based team to win the Canadian women's curling championship. The win earned Miskew and her team the right to represent Canada at the 2013 World Women's Curling Championship in Riga, Latvia. At the World championships, the Homan rink led Canada to an 8–3 round robin finish, which put them in third place. In the playoffs, they beat the United States (skipped by Erika Brown) in the 3 vs. 4 game, but they then lost to Scotland (skipped by Eve Muirhead in the semi-final, after Homan missed her last shot of the game, jamming a double takeout. After the loss, Homan would go on to beat the Americans once again, this time in the bronze medal game. The Homan rink wrapped up the season by losing in the quarter-final of the 2013 Players' Championship.

=== Scotties repeat champions and world silver medallists (2013–2014) ===
The defending Canadian champion Homan rink had a less successful start to their season in 2013–14. The team failed to win World Curling Tour event until winning the 2013 Masters, where she beat Muirhead in the final. Up until this point, Muirhead's rink had Homan's number, having also defeated her team in the semi-finals of the 2013 Curlers Corner Autumn Gold Curling Classic. Having made the playoffs in every Grand Slam event in 2012–13, the team failed to make the playoffs at the 2013 Colonial Square Ladies Classic.

Homan's success over the last couple of seasons qualified her team for an automatic entry at the 2013 Canadian Olympic Curling Trials. At the Trials, the team sneaked into the playoffs with a 4–3 round robin record, which was good enough for second place. However, in the semi-final of the event, the team would be defeated by Sherry Middaugh, ending the team's 2014 Olympic hopes.

As defending Scotties champions from 2013, the Homan rink earned the right to represent Team Canada at the 2014 Scotties Tournament of Hearts in Montreal. The event was notable for the absence of the Jennifer Jones rink who was competing at the Olympics. Nevertheless, the Homan team went through the entire tournament without a single loss, defeating Alberta's Val Sweeting in the final.

The Homan rinks 2014 Scotties win earned her team a berth at the 2014 World Women's Curling Championship in Saint John, New Brunswick. The team had a better event than the previous worlds, as they only lost one round robin game to finish first place heading into the playoffs. The team defeated Switzerland's Binia Feltscher in the 1 vs. 2 Page playoff game, but were unable to beat them again when they faced each other in the final match. Miskew and the rest of her Canadian team thus had to settle for a silver medal.

The Homan rink ended the season with a loss in the final of the 2014 Players' Championship against the Olympic gold medalist Jennifer Jones. The match marked the last game for second Alison Kreviazuk on the team, as she moved to Sweden to be with her boyfriend Fredrik Lindberg who played for Niklas Edin. Kreviazuk had played for Homan since they were bantam aged. Kreviazuk was replaced by Joanne Courtney from Edmonton.

=== Joanne Courtney joins the team (2014–2017) ===
The Homan rink found less success in the 2014–15 curling season after adding new second Joanne Courtney to the team. The team did not win any Slam events, losing in the finals of the 2014 Curlers Corner Autumn Gold Curling Classic (against Jennifer Jones) and the 2014 Canadian Open of Curling (against Eve Muirhead). The team also lost in the final of the 2014 Canada Cup of Curling against Valerie Sweeting. As defending champions, the team represented Team Canada at the 2015 Scotties Tournament of Hearts. The team nearly missed the playoffs but won their last round-robin game against Tracy Horgan to finish the round robin in 4th place with a 7–4 record. In the playoffs they would lose to Saskatchewan's Stefanie Lawton in the 3 vs. 4 game, but rebounded in the bronze medal game in a re-match against the Lawton rink, beating them 7–5. That season, the team would win one World Curling Tour event, the Pomeroy Inn & Suites Prairie Showdown held in March. That season, the team also won the inaugural 2016 Women's All-Star Curling Skins Game, taking home $52,000.

The team found much more success in the 2015–16 curling season, but were still wrought with some disappointment. They began the season with a win in the Stu Sells Oakville Tankard, followed by a loss in the first Slam, the 2015 GSOC Tour Challenge against Switzerland's Silvana Tirinzoni. The team then went on to win six Tour events in a row, the Stockholm Ladies Cup, the Curlers Corner Autumn Gold Curling Classic (no longer a Slam), the 2015 Masters of Curling, the 2015 National, the 2015 Canada Cup of Curling and the 2015 Canadian Open of Curling, amassing a huge lead in both the World Curling Tour Order of Merit and Money standings in the process. After this impressive run, the team's success seemed to dry-up. They were upset in the finals of the 2016 Ontario Scotties Tournament of Hearts against their club mates, the Jenn Hanna team, meaning the World #1 ranked Homan team would not be able to play in the national championships that year. The team was invited to play in the 2016 Elite 10 men's Grand Slam event, making history in the process. The team would only win one game in the event though, beating Charley Thomas' team. The team ended the season losing against Jennifer Jones in the final of the 2016 Humpty's Champions Cup. The Homan rink's success over the course of the season meant the team would end the season ranked number one in the world in both the Women's money list and order of merit standings.

The 2016–17 curling season was one of Miskew's best season to date. Her team began the season winning their first event, the 2016 AMJ Campbell Shorty Jenkins Classic. They followed this up by winning the 2016 Canad Inns Women's Classic the following month. A week later, the team lost in the final of the 2016 Masters of Curling against the Allison Flaxey rink. A month later, they lost in the final of the 2016 Canada Cup of Curling. In playdown play, the rink struggled in the round robin of the 2017 Ontario Scotties Tournament of Hearts, losing two games, and finishing second behind Jacqueline Harrison. However, they won both their playoff matches, including defeating Harrison in the final, qualifying the team to represent Ontario at that year's Scotties. Team Homan defeated Manitoba's Michelle Englot to win the 2017 Scotties, her third Scotties title in four years. She won in an extra end in what many considered to be one of the most exciting Scotties finals ever. Both teams went 10–1 in the round robin, with Homan's lone loss coming at Englot's expense. Englot beat Homan once again in the 1 vs. 2 game, forcing Homan to beat Northern Ontario (Krista McCarville) in the semifinal to force the re-match against Englot. At the 2017 world championship in Beijing Homan's rink became only the third in tournament history to go unbeaten in round-robin play, joining fellow Canadian Colleen Jones from 2003 and Sweden's Anette Norberg from 2005. She ended up going unbeaten right to the end, the only team to do so to date, winning the gold medal by beating Anna Sidorova (for the 3rd consecutive time with wins in the round robin, 1–2 playoff game, and final) 8–3 for the gold medal, her first world title and completing her medal set at worlds. The Homan rink finished the season by winning the 2017 Humpty's Champions Cup.

=== Olympic run (2017–2018) ===
Miskew began the 2017-18 curling season by winning the 2017 Prestige Hotels & Resorts Curling Classic and then the Curlers Corner Autumn Gold Curling Classic the following week. Miskew and her team won the 2017 Canadian Olympic Curling Trials in her hometown of Ottawa, defeating previously unbeaten Chelsea Carey. The Homan rink had lost just one game in the tournament, against Carey in the round robin. After her Trials win, the Homan rink began to struggle. The team would then go on to play at the 2018 Winter Olympics where they started disastrously. Losing to the team from Denmark meant that Canada was 0-3 for the first time ever at an Olympics. The game against Denmark was marked with controversy when Denmark burned a rock as it was coming to a rest. Rather than letting the rock be adjusted Miskew's skip Homan removed the stone. Joan McCusker commentating for CBC at the Olympics said of Homan's move that "I think that was a rash move to take it off. They should have left it in play. It doesn't look good on you." Homan and team would win their next three to stay in the fight for the medals but would lose their next two, with their fifth loss against Eve Muirhead officially eliminating them from medal contention. This made Homan's team the first Canadian Olympic curlers to not play for or win a medal. They won the final event of the year, the 2018 Humpty's Champions Cup.

=== Post Olympics (2018–2020) ===
Team Homan's 2018-19 curling season began by winning the first leg of the Curling World Cup, defeating Sweden's Anna Hasselborg in the final. Hasselborg got the best of Homan the following month, beating her in the final of the 2018 Masters. Homan then went on to win the next grand slam event, the 2018 Tour Challenge, defeating Tracy Fleury in the final. The Homan rink struggled at the 2018 Canada Cup, going 5–2 in the round robin, and losing in the semifinal to Jennifer Jones. The team rebounded a week later to win the 2018 National, beating Kerri Einarson in the final. The next month, Miskew won her third Grand Slam of the season, the 2019 Meridian Canadian Open, defeating Silvana Tirinzoni in the final. Homan and her rink played in the 2019 Ontario Scotties Tournament of Hearts, having missed the previous year's event due to the Olympics and having won the 2017 Scotties). At the event, the team lost just one game en route to their fourth provincial title. However, controversy brewed due to an incident of bullying aimed at Miskew's skip Homan. A "number of curlers" at the event voted for her to win the tournament's sportsmanship award to protest the fact that the team had two members (Homan and Courtney) living in Alberta (teams are only allowed one "import" player from out of province, however, Homan maintains a residence in Ontario and is exempted from requirements as she is a full-time student at the University of Alberta). At the 2019 Scotties Tournament of Hearts her team finished the round robin at 5–2 as third seed. The team qualified for the final beating Northern Ontario's Krista McCarville and Saskatchewan's Robyn Silvernagle but eventually finished as runner up, losing the final to Alberta's Chelsea Carey in an extra end despite leading 5–1 in the fourth end. At the 2019 Players' Championship, the team struggled and ended up missing the playoffs after posting a 2-3 round robin record and losing the tie-breaker to Satsuki Fujisawa. They finished off the season with a semi-final finish at the 2019 Champions Cup.

In their first event of the 2019–20 season, Team Homan had a semi-final finish at the 2019 AMJ Campbell Shorty Jenkins Classic. They then followed it up by winning the 2019 Colonial Square Ladies Classic. The team would appear in another final in mid-October at the 2019 Canad Inns Women's Classic where they lost to Elena Stern. They missed the playoffs at all four Slams of the season as both the Players' Championship and the Champions Cup were cancelled due to the COVID-19 pandemic. Team Homan would win the first spot in the 2021 Canadian Olympic Curling Trials by defeating Tracy Fleury in the final of the 2019 Canada Cup. The team went undefeated at the 2020 Ontario Scotties Tournament of Hearts, defeating Hollie Duncan in the final. At the 2020 Scotties Tournament of Hearts they would win their second straight silver medal, losing the final this year to Manitoba's Kerri Einarson.

=== Sarah Wilkes joins the team (2020–2022) ===
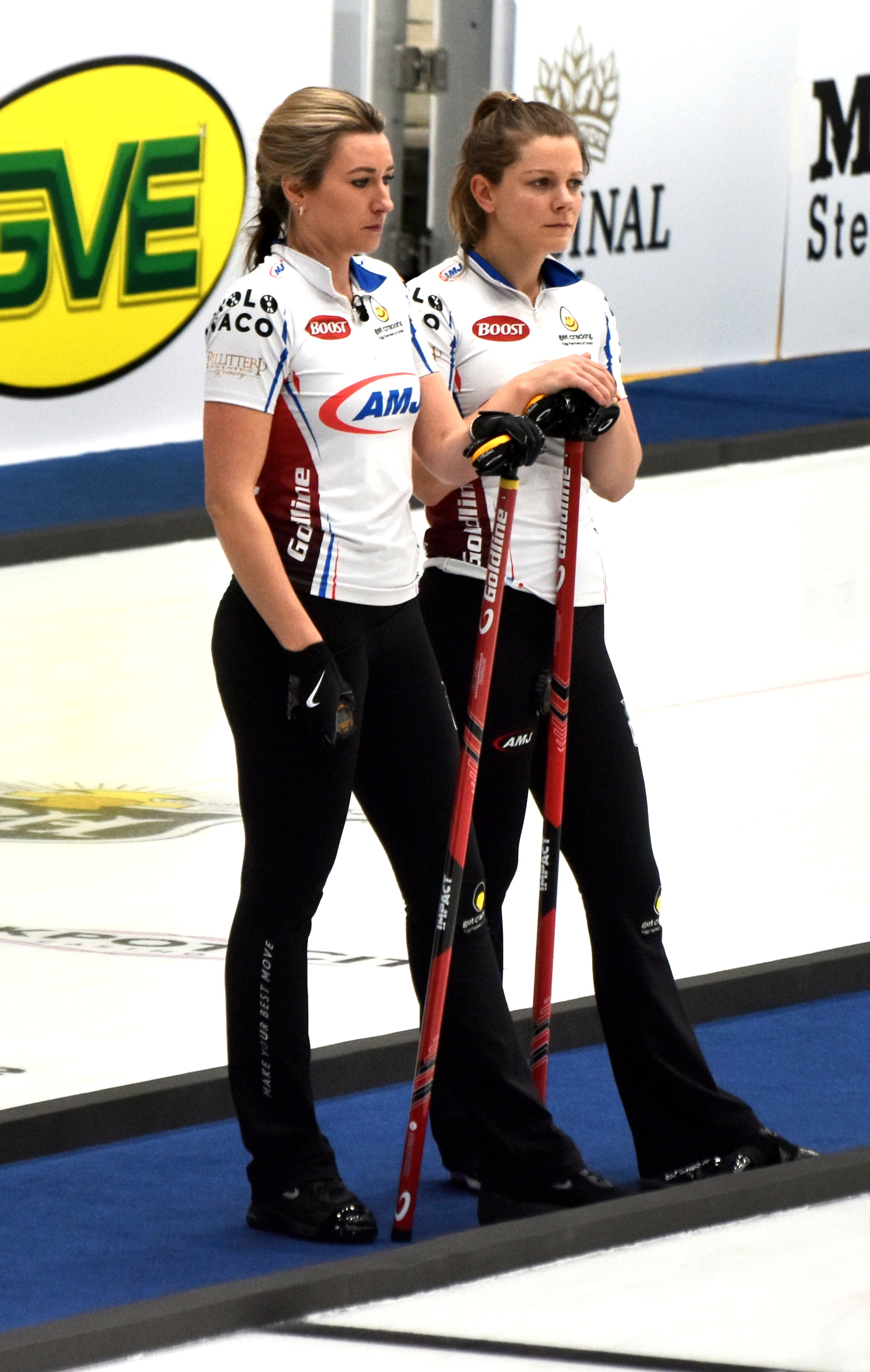
Miskew (left) with Wilkes

Team Homan announced on March 12, 2020, that the team was parting ways with longtime lead Lisa Weagle. On March 17, 2020, the team announced they would be adding Sarah Wilkes as their new second, with Joanne Courtney moving to lead.

The 2021 Ontario provincial playdowns were cancelled due to the COVID-19 pandemic in Ontario. As the 2020 provincial champions, Homan's team was chosen to represent Ontario at the 2021 Scotties Tournament of Hearts in Calgary. Up to that point, they had only played in one tour game the entire season in the Okotoks Ladies Classic in November, before that event was cancelled due to a province-wide shutdown in Alberta. At the Scotties, they had a successful round robin, with a 7–1 record, including a win against defending champion Kerri Einarson. They entered the championship pool as the first seed, where they won three games and lost one to Manitoba's Jennifer Jones. Because of their earlier win against Einarson, Homan's team received a bye to the final. There, they lost 9–7 to Einarson after Homan missed a freeze in the last end, resulting in Einarson not needing to throw her last rock. A month later, Miskew was back in the Calgary bubble to compete with Ryan Fry at the 2021 Canadian Mixed Doubles Curling Championship. The pair qualified for the playoffs with a 5–1 record before losing to Shannon Birchard and Catlin Schneider in the round of 12, eliminating them from contention. Miskew returned to the bubble a third time in April 2021 with Team Homan to play in the two only Grand Slam events of the abbreviated season. Up until the day the event started, Miskew was supposed to skip the team as Homan had just given birth to her second child three weeks earlier. However, Homan returned in time for the event, leaving the team's original lineup intact. At the first Slam, the 2021 Champions Cup, the team defeated Silvana Tirinzoni to claim their eleventh slam title. A week later, they played in the 2021 Players' Championship, where they lost in the final to Team Einarson in a re-match of the Scotties final.

Team Homan made it to the quarterfinals of their first slam of the year, the 2021 Masters, where they were beaten by Alina Kovaleva. Two weeks later, they played in the 2021 National, where they were eliminated in the quarters again, this time by Anna Hasselborg. Next for Team Homan was the 2021 Canadian Olympic Curling Trials where they attempted to qualify for the Olympics again. The team, however, did not have a successful week, finishing with a 2–6 record. Team Homan's record over the season was not good enough to give them an automatic qualifying spot at the 2022 Ontario Scotties Tournament of Hearts, forcing them to play in an open qualifier. The team did qualify at the Open Qualifier, but the Ontario Scotties were postponed due to new COVID-19 regulations put into place by the province, shutting down sports event. With the postponement of the Ontario Scotties, CurlON announced that they would be selecting Team Hollie Duncan over Team Homan to represent Ontario if Homan was selected to represent Canada in the mixed doubles event at the 2022 Olympics (as the Trials had been cancelled). However, if Homan wasn't selected, then CurlON would select Team Homan to play in the Scotties instead. This plan of action was considered confusion and disappointing to the teams involved. Homan would end up being selected to represent Canada at the Olympics, giving Team Duncan the right to represent Ontario at the 2022 Scotties. However, the rest of Team Homan qualified for the Scotties as Team Wild Card #3. For the Tournament of Hearts, Miskew, Sarah Wilkes and Joanne Courtney added Allison Flaxey to their lineup. At the championship, Miskew led the team to a 4–4 round robin record, not advancing to the playoff round. Team Homan had to wait until April 2022 to play in the postponed Ontario Hearts, which they ended up winning, beating Carly Howard in the final. The team wrapped up their season with the two final slams, making it to the semifinals at the 2022 Players' Championship where they lost to Anna Hasselborg, and the quarters of the 2022 Champions Cup, where they lost to Kerri Einarson. In March 2022, after Joanne Courtney announced she would be stepping back from competitive curling, it was announced that Tracy Fleury would be joining the team for the 2022–23 season. With the addition of Fleury on the back-end, Miskew moved to playing front-end for the first time in her career.

=== Tracy Fleury joins Team Homan (2022–present) ===
In August 2022, it was announced that Tracy Fleury would be skipping Team Homan, with Rachel Homan continuing to throw last rocks on the team. With the addition of Fleury, Miskew was moved to the second position for the first time since joining forces with Homan as a teenager. The new lineup made their debut at the 2022 Saville Shoot-Out, making it to the final before losing to Jennifer Jones and her new team. Later on in the month, Team Homan played in the inaugural PointsBet Invitational tournament organized by Curling Canada. The team made it to the quarterfinals, where they lost to Team Scheidegger, which was skipped by Kristie Moore in a draw-to-the button to break a 6–6 tie. The next month in October, the team played in the first Slam of the season, the 2022 National. There, the team made it to the quarterfinals before losing out to another new-look team skipped by Kaitlyn Lawes. Later that month, the team played in the next Slam, the 2022 Tour Challenge. The team won the event, defeating Kerri Einarson 8–4 in the final, winning the Homan rinks twelfth Slam title, and the first for their new team. In November, the team won their second Tour event of the season at the Red Deer Curling Classic, defeating Casey Scheidegger in the final. In December, the team played in their third Slam of the season, the 2022 Masters. The team made it to the final against Team Einarson again, but this time Einarson had the best of them, beating Team Homan 6–5 in an extra end. In January, the team played in the 2023 Canadian Open, making it as far as the quarterfinals this time before matching up against Einarson. Team Homan couldn't get past Einarson again, and were eliminated after a 7–2 decision. Later in the month, the team won the 2023 Ontario Scotties Tournament of Hearts, Miskew's seventh career provincial championship. They defeated Hollie Duncan in the final. The team represented Ontario at the 2023 Scotties Tournament of Hearts, going 6–2 in pool play. This put the team into the Championship round, where they were eliminated after a loss to Nova Scotia, skipped by Christina Black. In April, Team Homan played in the 2023 Players' Championship, missing the playoffs, but rebounded to win the 2023 Champions Cup to cap off the season. The team beat their rivals in the Kerri Einarson rink in the final, coming back from a 4–0 deficit to win the championship 6–5, giving the team their thirteenth Grand Slam title. Homan took over as skip at the event, as it was announced she was pregnant.

At the beginning of the 2023–24 season, it was announced that Homan would take over as skip of the team, with Fleury taking on regular third duties. The team also brought in former World Men's Champion and Olympic silver medallist Don Bartlett as their coach. The team began the season without Homan, who had just given birth to her third child. With Heather Nedohin in her place, the team went on to win the 2023 Saville Shootout. Homan returned to her team for the 2023 PointsBet Invitational, where they made it to the final, beating Kerri Einarson there 9–7 to claim the title, and $50,000 in the process. Three weeks later, Team Homan played in their first Slam of the season, the 2023 Tour Challenge. There, the team went 2–2, being eliminated from playoff contention due to a poor tournament draw to the button shootout score. The team made it to the final in the next Slam, the 2023 National. There, they went undefeated until they faced the equally undefeated Gim Eun-ji Korean rink in that game, which they lost 7–6. A week later, the team played in the Red Deer Curling Classic again, winning their second straight title after easily defeating the Selena Sturmay rink in the final, 8–1. The team continued their success in December, winning the 2023 Masters, their fourteenth Slam title and first of the season. They defeated Silvana Tirinzoni of Switzerland in the final, 8–4. A month later, the team won their second slam title in a row and fifteenth overall when the rink downed Tirinzoni again in the final of the 2024 Canadian Open. The team won 5–4, stealing the game in an extra end, after trailing 4–2 after the seventh end.

New qualifying rules for the Scotties Tournament of Hearts allowed Team Homan a pre-qualifying spot at the 2024 Scotties Tournament of Hearts without having to play in the 2024 playdowns. At the Hearts, the team went undefeated, winning all eleven of their games, including the final, where they beat Jennifer Jones, another pre-qualifier team, 5–4. It was Jones' last Hearts, as she decided to retire prior to the event. The win was Miskew's fourth career Hearts title.

With the Scotties win, the team went on to represent Canada at the 2024 World Women's Curling Championship. At the Worlds, the team had an unmatched 11–1 round robin record which included ending Switzerland and Silvana Tirinzoni's 42 game winning streak at the Women's Worlds, which dated back to the 2021 Worlds. Their only defeat came against South Korea (skipped by Gim Eun-ji) in the last draw, a meaningless game for the team, as they had clinched first place and a bye to the semifinals. Team Canada faced-off against the Koreans again in the semifinals, and this time beat them, 9–7. This put them into the final, where they faced off against the four-time defending World Champion Tirinzoni team. Heading into the ninth end of the game, the team was down 5–4 to the Swiss, but Homan made a split of a rock in the 12-foot on her last to score three, giving her team a 7–5 lead. Switzerland conceded the game in the 10th after deciding they didn't have a shot to tie the game, giving Miskew her second World Championship title.

Team Homan ended the 2023–24 season at the 2024 Players' Championship. The rink went undefeated in the tournament until the semifinal, where they lost to the same Tirinzoni rink they had beaten in the World Championship final. Team Homan would finish the season with an "unprecedented" 67–7 win-loss record.

In August 2025, it was announced that the team had found a new coach in two-time World bronze medallist Heather Nedohin, who had spared for the rink in 2023 while Homan was pregnant. In the team's first event of the 2025–26 curling season, they lost to Denmark's Madeleine Dupont in the semifinal of the 2025 AMJ Campbell Shorty Jenkins Classic. Two weeks later, the team played in their first Slam of the season, the AMJ Masters. The team won all seven of their games at the event, defeating rivals Silvana Tirinzoni in the final, 6–4. Team Homan would then go on to win her second slam of the season at the 2025 Tour Challenge, again defeating Tirinzoni in the final. This would be both Homan and Miskew's 19th career grand slam title, passing Kevin Martin for most all-time. Team Homan would continue their dominance at the 2025 GSOC Tahoe, defeating Tirinzoni in the third straight slam final of the season, extending their record with a 20th Grand Slam of Curling title.

The Homan rink would complete their bid to represent Canada at the 2026 Winter Olympics by winning the 2025 Canadian Olympic Curling Trials, winning both games against Christina Black in the best-of-three final, marking Miskew's second Olympic appearance.

== Personal life ==
Miskew was born in Ottawa, went to Brookfield High School, and graduated with an industrial design degree from Carleton University in 2012. She currently is employed as a graphic designer.

== Teams ==
Season	Skip	Third	Second	Lead	Notes	Tour earnings (rank) (CAD)	Coach
2002–03	Rachel Homan	Emma Miskew	Alison Kreviazuk	Nikki Johnston		n/a	
2003–04	Rachel Homan	Emma Miskew	Alison Kreviazuk	Nikki Johnston		n/a	
2004–05	Rachel Homan	Emma Miskew	Alison Kreviazuk	Nikki Johnston		$800 (101st)	
2005–06	Rachel Homan	Emma Miskew	Lynn Kreviazuk	Jamie Sinclair	Team qualified for the 2007 Canada Games	DNP	
2006–07	Rachel Homan	Emma Miskew	Alison Kreviazuk	Nikki Johnston	For the Canada Games team, see previous season	$2,250 (71st)	Earle Morris
2007–08	Rachel Homan	Emma Miskew	Alison Kreviazuk	Lynn Kreviazuk		$11,000 (18th)	
2008–09	Rachel Homan	Emma Miskew	Alison Kreviazuk	Lynn Kreviazuk		$31,200 (8th)	Earle Morris
2009–10	Rachel Homan	Emma Miskew	Alison Kreviazuk	Lynn Kreviazuk	Laura Crocker for A. Kreviazuk in junior events	$5,500 (32nd)	Earle Morris
2010–11	Rachel Homan	Emma Miskew	Alison Kreviazuk	Lisa Weagle	Alternate Sherry Middaugh for Scotties	$27,300 (8th)	Andrea Ronnebeck
2011–12	Rachel Homan	Emma Miskew	Alison Kreviazuk	Lisa Weagle		$8,800 (26th)	Andrea Ronnebeck
2012–13	Rachel Homan	Emma Miskew	Alison Kreviazuk	Lisa Weagle	Alternate Stephanie LeDrew for Scotties and Worlds	$60,800 (1st)	Earle Morris
2013–14	Rachel Homan	Emma Miskew	Alison Kreviazuk	Lisa Weagle	Alternate Heather Smith for Olympic Trials; Alternate Stephanie LeDrew for Scotties and Worlds	$51,900 (4th)	Earle Morris
2014–15	Rachel Homan	Emma Miskew	Joanne Courtney	Lisa Weagle	Alternate Cheryl Kreviazuk for Scotties	$91,608 (1st)	Richard Hart
2015–16	Rachel Homan	Emma Miskew	Joanne Courtney	Lisa Weagle		$183,754 (1st)	Marcel Rocque; Richard Hart
2016–17	Rachel Homan	Emma Miskew	Joanne Courtney	Lisa Weagle	Alternate Cheryl Kreviazuk for Scotties and Worlds; Sarah Wilkes in for Courtney at 2017 Humpty's Champions Cup	$132,500 (1st)	Adam Kingsbury
2017–18	Rachel Homan	Emma Miskew	Joanne Courtney	Lisa Weagle	Alternate Cheryl Kreviazuk for Olympic Trials; Alternate Cheryl Bernard for Olympics	$43,500 (13th)	Adam Kingsbury
2018–19	Rachel Homan	Emma Miskew	Joanne Courtney	Lisa Weagle	Alternate Cheryl Kreviazuk for Scotties; Substitute Laura Walker at the 2019 Players' Championship; Jolene Campbell in for Courtney at the 2019 Champions Cup	$181,848 (1st)	Marcel Rocque
2019–20	Rachel Homan	Emma Miskew	Joanne Courtney	Lisa Weagle	Alternate Cheryl Kreviazuk for Scotties	$35,300 (13th)	Marcel Rocque
2020–21	Rachel Homan	Emma Miskew	Sarah Wilkes	Joanne Courtney	Alternate Danielle Inglis for Scotties; Alternate Laura Walker at Grand Slams	$50,000 (NR) (Note: Due to the COVID-19 pandemic, there was no official money ranking for this season. Team Homan won $25,000 at the Champions Cup and $25,000 at the Players' Championship, the only two tour events they played in.)	Randy Ferbey
2021–22	Rachel Homan	Emma Miskew	Sarah Wilkes	Joanne Courtney	Substitute Allison Flaxey at second, Wilkes at third, Miskew at skip for the Scotties	$50,633 (9th) (Note: Following the 2020–21 season, tour money rankings were no longer published. Ranking displayed is the end of season World Curling Federation team ranking.)	Marcel Rocque
2022–23	Rachel Homan (Fourth)	Tracy Fleury (Skip)	Emma Miskew	Sarah Wilkes	Alternate Kira Brunton for Scotties; Alternate Rachelle Brown at Slams	$123000 (3rd)	Ryan Fry
2023–24	Rachel Homan	Tracy Fleury	Emma Miskew	Sarah Wilkes	Alternate Rachelle Brown for Scotties and Worlds	$203,000 (1st)	Don Bartlett
2024–25	Rachel Homan	Tracy Fleury	Emma Miskew	Sarah Wilkes	Alternate Rachelle Brown	$255,000 (1st)	Brendan Bottcher (Sept.–Oct.); Jennifer Jones (STOH)
2025–26	Rachel Homan	Tracy Fleury	Emma Miskew	Sarah Wilkes	Alternate Rachelle Brown		
