= 2012 The Masters Grand Slam of Curling =

Grand Slam of Curling event

- Host city: Brantford, Ontario; Paris, Ontario
- Arena: Wayne Gretzky Sports Centre; Brantford Golf & Curling Club; Paris Curling Club; Brant Curling Club
- Dates: November 14–18
- Men's winner: (Alberta) Kevin Koe
- Curling club: Glencoe CC, Calgary
- Skip: Kevin Koe
- Third: Pat Simmons
- Second: Carter Rycroft
- Lead: Nolan Thiessen
- Finalist: (British Columbia) Jim Cotter
- Women's winner: (Ontario) Rachel Homan
- Curling club: Ottawa CC, Ottawa
- Skip: Rachel Homan
- Third: Emma Miskew
- Second: Alison Kreviazuk
- Lead: Lisa Weagle
- Finalist: (Manitoba) Chelsea Carey

The 2012 Masters Grand Slam of Curling was held from November 14 to 18 at the Wayne Gretzky Sports Centre, the Brantford Golf & Curling Club, the Paris Curling Club, and the Brant Curling Club in Brantford and Paris, Ontario as part of the 2012–13 World Curling Tour. The majority of the women's Tier I round robin games and some of the men's Tier I round robin games was held at the Brantford Golf & Curling Club, while the remainder of the Tier I games and the playoffs round games were held at the Wayne Gretzky Sports Centre. The men's Tier II games and playoffs qualifiers was held at the Brant Curling Club, while the women's Tier II games and playoffs qualifiers was held at the Paris Curling Club and the Brantford Golf & Curling Club. It was held as the first Grand Slam event on the men's tour and the fourth on the women's tour.

The Masters is a continuation of the men's World Cup Grand Slam event which was previously known as the Masters. This was the first time that women participated in the event, but is considered a continuation of the women's Sun Life Classic.

Both the women's and men's events were split up into two tiers, with 18 teams in Tier I and 16 teams in Tier II. The Tier I teams were divided into 3 pools of 6 teams which played in a round robin, while the Tier II teams played off in a triple knockout event. 8 Tier II teams qualified for a playoff to determine which two teams would enter the playoffs along with six Tier I teams.

Rogers Sportsnet covered selected draws on television, while CBC Television aired the men's and women's finals. This marked the first time since 2006 that Sportsnet showed curling, as they have begun a new commitment to showing the sport, specifically Grand Slam events.

The total purse for the men's event was $100,000, while the purse for the women's event was $50,000.

== Men ==
In the final of the men's event, Kevin Koe of Alberta defeated Jim Cotter of British Columbia with a score of 7–5.

=== Tier I ===
==== Round Robin Standings ====
Final Round Robin Standings

Key
Teams to Playoffs
Teams to Tiebreakers

Pool A	W	L
(Alberta) Kevin Koe	3	2
(Switzerland) Peter de Cruz	3	2
(Manitoba) Jeff Stoughton	3	2
(Manitoba) Rob Fowler	2	3
(Ontario) Glenn Howard	2	3
(Ontario) Robert Rumfeldt	1	4

Pool B	W	L
(Ontario) Brad Jacobs	5	0
(British Columbia) Jim Cotter	3	2
(Manitoba) Mike McEwen	3	2
(Sweden) Niklas Edin	2	3
(Newfoundland and Labrador) Brad Gushue	2	3
(Ontario) Mark Kean	0	5

Pool C	W	L
(Alberta) Kevin Martin	4	1
(Quebec) Jean-Michel Ménard	3	2
(Denmark) Rasmus Stjerne	3	2
(Norway) Thomas Ulsrud	3	2
(Ontario) John Epping	2	3
(Switzerland) Sven Michel	0	5

=== Tier II ===
==== Playoffs Qualifiers ====
Semifinals		To Playoffs
(Nova Scotia) Jamie Murphy	5
(British Columbia) Sean Geall	3	(Nova Scotia) Jamie Murphy	8
(Ontario) Mark Bice	6	(Ontario) Mark Bice	9
(Quebec) Martin Ferland	1

Semifinals		To Playoffs
(Saskatchewan) Steve Laycock	5
(Ontario) Joe Frans	4	(Saskatchewan) Steve Laycock	5
(Ontario) Bryan Cochrane	9	(Ontario) Bryan Cochrane	1
(Ontario) Wayne Tuck Jr.	2

=== Playoffs ===
Quarterfinals
(Ontario) Brad Jacobs	1
(Saskatchewan) Steve Laycock	4
(Manitoba) Mike McEwen	3
(British Columbia) Jim Cotter	6
(Alberta) Kevin Koe	6
(Ontario) Mark Bice	4
(Alberta) Kevin Martin	5
(Manitoba) Jeff Stoughton	3

Semifinals
(Saskatchewan) Steve Laycock	3
(British Columbia) Jim Cotter	6
(Alberta) Kevin Koe	6
(Alberta) Kevin Martin	5

Final
(British Columbia) Jim Cotter	5
(Alberta) Kevin Koe	7

==== Final ====
Sunday, November 18, 13:00

Team	1	2	3	4	5	6	7	8	Final
(British Columbia) Jim Cotter	2	0	1	0	0	0	2	0	5
(Alberta) Kevin Koe	0	2	0	0	3	1	0	1	7

Player percentages
(British Columbia) Jim Cotter		(Alberta) Kevin Koe	
Rick Sawatsky	95%	Nolan Thiessen	91%
Tyrel Griffith	79%	Carter Rycroft	91%
Jason Gunnlaugson	82%	Pat Simmons	82%
Jim Cotter	72%	Kevin Koe	82%
Total	82%	Total	87%

== Women ==
In the final of the women's event, Rachel Homan of Ontario defeated Chelsea Carey of Manitoba with a score of 8–3.

=== Tier I ===
==== Round Robin Standings ====
Final Round Robin Standings

Key
Teams to Playoffs
Teams to Tiebreakers

Pool A	W	L
(Switzerland) Silvana Tirinzoni	4	1
(Manitoba) Kaitlyn Lawes	3	2
(Wisconsin) Erika Brown	2	3
(Switzerland) Mirjam Ott	2	3
(Alberta) Valerie Sweeting	2	3
(Alberta) Crystal Webster	2	3

Pool B	W	L
(Ontario) Rachel Homan	5	0
(Alberta) Shannon Kleibrink	3	2
(Ontario) Sherry Middaugh	3	2
(Scotland) Eve Muirhead	3	2
(Manitoba) Cathy Overton-Clapham	1	4
(Alberta) Laura Crocker	0	5

Pool C	W	L
(Manitoba) Chelsea Carey	4	1
(Russia) Anna Sidorova	3	2
(Switzerland) Michèle Jäggi	2	3
(Saskatchewan) Stefanie Lawton	2	3
(Alberta) Heather Nedohin	2	3
(British Columbia) Kelly Scott	2	3

=== Tier II ===
==== Playoffs Qualifiers ====
Semifinals		To Playoffs
(Ontario) Cathy Auld	5
(Ontario) Allison Nimik	7	(Ontario) Allison Nimik	3
(Prince Edward Island) Suzanne Birt	4	(Newfoundland and Labrador) Heather Strong	7
(Newfoundland and Labrador) Heather Strong	6

Semifinals		To Playoffs
(Ontario) Tracy Horgan	7
(Quebec) Marie-France Larouche	6	(Ontario) Tracy Horgan	6
(Ontario) Jacqueline Harrison	2	(Ontario) Krista McCarville	5
(Ontario) Krista McCarville	4

=== Playoffs ===
Quarterfinals
(Ontario) Rachel Homan	6
(Ontario) Tracy Horgan	2
(Alberta) Shannon Kleibrink	2
(Scotland) Eve Muirhead	7
(Manitoba) Chelsea Carey	4
(Newfoundland and Labrador) Heather Strong	0
(Switzerland) Silvana Tirinzoni	6
(Ontario) Sherry Middaugh	5

Semifinals
(Ontario) Rachel Homan	5
(Scotland) Eve Muirhead	4
(Manitoba) Chelsea Carey	7
(Switzerland) Silvana Tirinzoni	3

Final
(Ontario) Rachel Homan	8
(Manitoba) Chelsea Carey	3

==== Final ====
Sunday, November 18, 13:00

Team	1	2	3	4	5	6	7	8	Final
(Ontario) Rachel Homan	0	1	2	0	2	0	3	X	8
(Manitoba) Chelsea Carey	0	0	0	2	0	1	0	X	3

Player percentages
(Ontario) Rachel Homan		(Manitoba) Chelsea Carey	
Lisa Weagle	88%	Lindsay Titheridge	79%
Alison Kreviazuk	84%	Kristen Foster	59%
Emma Miskew	73%	Kristy McDonald	76%
Rachel Homan	79%	Chelsea Carey	76%
Total	81%	Total	72%
