= 2022 Ontario Scotties Tournament of Hearts =

- Host city: Thornhill, Ontario
- Arena: The Thornhill Club
- Dates: April 7–10
- Winner: Team Homan
- Curling club: Ottawa Curling Club, Ottawa
- Skip: Rachel Homan
- Third: Emma Miskew
- Second: Sarah Wilkes
- Lead: Joanne Courtney
- Finalist: Carly Howard

The 2022 Ontario Scotties Tournament of Hearts, the provincial women's curling championship for Southern Ontario was held April 7 to 10, 2022 at the Thornhill Club in Thornhill, Ontario.

The event was originally going to be held from January 5 to 9 2022, but on January 3, following new COVID-19 regulations implemented by the province, CurlON decided to suspend the event. The winning team would have represented Ontario at the 2022 Scotties Tournament of Hearts in Thunder Bay, Ontario, to be held January 28 to February 6 2022.

On January 7, CurlON announced that Team Rachel Homan would represent Ontario at the 2022 Scotties Tournament of Hearts, unless Homan is chosen to represent Canada in mixed doubles at the 2022 Winter Olympics, with a plan to hold the provincial championship in April 2022. Homan was chosen to play in the Olympics, so Team Hollie Duncan was chosen to represent Ontario instead. Instead, Team Homan (without Homan herself), skipped by normal third Emma Miskew will play at the national Tournament of Hearts as Team Wild Card #3.

On January 19, CurlON announced that the provincial championship would be rescheduled for April 7 to 10, and that the winner will earn a bye to the 2023 Ontario Scotties Tournament of Hearts, and that there would be a purse of $15,000 for the event.

== Qualification process ==
Eight teams qualified, two from a cash spiel qualifier, three from an open qualifier, the southern Ontario team with the best record at the 2021 Canadian Olympic Curling Trials, the top southern Ontario team in the CTRS standings (December 1, 2021), and one from the "Trillium Tour Series", the top team from a series of Ontario Curling Tour events.

Qualification method	Berths	Qualifying team(s)
CTRS leader	1	Hollie Duncan
Top Trials Team	1	~~Jacqueline Harrison~~
Trillium Tour Series	1	Carly Howard
Cash Spiel	2	Danielle Inglis; Lauren Mann
Open Qualifier	3	Calissa Daly; Susan Froud; Rachel Homan
CTRS replacement	–	Katelyn Wasylkiw (replaces Harrison)

== Teams ==
The team lineups are as follows:

Skip	Third	Second	Lead	Alternate	Club
Calissa Daly	Breanna Rozon	Michaela Robert	Alice Holyoke	Evelyn Robert	Guelph Curling Club, Guelph
Sherry Middaugh*	Julie Tippin	Megan Balsdon	Tess Bobbie		Woodstock Curling Club, Woodstock
Susan Froud	Grace Lloyd	Kaelyn Gregory	Kristin Turcotte	Kristina Brauch	Alliston Curling Club, Alliston
Rachel Homan	Emma Miskew	Sarah Wilkes	Joanne Courtney		Ottawa Curling Club, Ottawa
Danielle Inglis	Kimberly Tuck	Stephanie Corrado	Cassandra de Groot		Dixie Curling Club, Mississauga
Lauren Mann	Kira Brunton	Cheryl Kreviazuk	Marcia Richardson		Ottawa Curling Club, Ottawa
Carly Howard	Stephanie Matheson	Grace Holyoke	Jestyn Murphy	Janet Murphy	Mississaugua Golf & Country Club, Mississauga
Katelyn Wasylkiw	Lauren Wasylkiw	Stephanie Thompson	Erin Way		Whitby Curling Club, Whitby

* Middaugh replacing regular skip Hollie Duncan

== Round robin standings ==
Final round robin standings

Key
Teams to Playoffs

Skip (Club)	W	L	PF	PA	EW	EL	BE	SE
Rachel Homan (Ottawa)	5	2	41	27	27	19	3	12
Team Duncan (Woodstock)	5	2	47	27	25	21	5	11
Carly Howard (Mississaugua)	5	2	48	32	23	20	1	5
Katelyn Wasylkiw (Whitby)	4	3	49	42	27	23	1	9
Danielle Inglis (Dixie)	3	4	39	39	27	24	4	10
Susan Froud (Alliston)	3	4	37	42	24	25	2	8
Lauren Mann (Ottawa)	2	5	30	47	18	25	4	6
Calissa Daly (Guelph)	1	6	26	52	17	31	3	4

== Round robin results ==
All draws are listed in Eastern Time (UTC−05:00). Games were 8 ends rather than the typical 10.

=== Draw 1 ===
Thursday, April 7, 2:30 pm

Sheet A	1	2	3	4	5	6	7	8	Final
Team Duncan 🔨	0	3	0	0	3	0	0	3	9
Susan Froud	0	0	1	1	0	1	1	0	4

Sheet B	1	2	3	4	5	6	7	8	Final
Lauren Mann	0	3	1	0	2	0	2	X	8
Rachel Homan 🔨	0	0	0	1	0	1	0	X	2

Sheet C	1	2	3	4	5	6	7	8	Final
Danielle Inglis	0	0	1	0	0	1	2	1	5
Calissa Daly 🔨	1	1	0	0	2	0	0	0	4

Sheet D	1	2	3	4	5	6	7	8	Final
Carly Howard	4	0	3	4	X	X	X	X	11
Katelyn Wasylkiw 🔨	0	1	0	0	X	X	X	X	1

=== Draw 2 ===
Thursday, April 7, 8:00 pm

Sheet A	1	2	3	4	5	6	7	8	Final
Rachel Homan	1	1	0	1	2	0	2	X	7
Carly Howard 🔨	0	0	1	0	0	1	0	X	2

Sheet B	1	2	3	4	5	6	7	8	Final
Team Duncan	1	0	0	2	1	1	2	X	7
Calissa Daly 🔨	0	1	1	0	0	0	0	X	2

Sheet C	1	2	3	4	5	6	7	8	Final
Susan Froud 🔨	2	0	0	2	0	1	0	3	8
Katelyn Wasylkiw	0	4	1	0	1	0	1	0	7

Sheet D	1	2	3	4	5	6	7	8	Final
Lauren Mann 🔨	0	2	0	0	1	1	0	3	7
Danielle Inglis	0	0	2	2	0	0	1	0	5

=== Draw 3 ===
Friday, April 8, 9:30 am

Sheet A	1	2	3	4	5	6	7	8	Final
Lauren Mann	0	0	1	1	0	3	0	0	5
Calissa Daly 🔨	3	2	0	0	1	0	0	2	8

Sheet B	1	2	3	4	5	6	7	8	Final
Susan Froud	0	0	1	0	0	1	0	X	2
Carly Howard 🔨	0	3	0	1	1	0	3	X	8

Sheet C	1	2	3	4	5	6	7	8	Final
Team Duncan 🔨	1	1	0	0	1	0	0	1	4
Danielle Inglis	0	0	1	1	0	1	0	0	3

Sheet D	1	2	3	4	5	6	7	8	Final
Rachel Homan	0	1	0	0	2	1	0	0	4
Katelyn Wasylkiw 🔨	1	0	0	2	0	0	1	1	5

=== Draw 4 ===
Friday, April 8, 2:30 pm

Sheet A	1	2	3	4	5	6	7	8	Final
Rachel Homan 🔨	0	3	0	3	1	0	0	1	8
Danielle Inglis	0	0	2	0	0	3	1	0	6

Sheet B	1	2	3	4	5	6	7	8	Final
Team Duncan	0	2	1	0	3	0	0	0	6
Katelyn Wasylkiw 🔨	1	0	0	3	0	1	1	1	7

Sheet C	1	2	3	4	5	6	7	8	Final
Lauren Mann	0	1	0	1	0	X	X	X	2
Carly Howard 🔨	5	0	3	0	1	X	X	X	9

Sheet D	1	2	3	4	5	6	7	8	Final
Susan Froud	1	1	1	4	0	0	4	X	11
Calissa Daly 🔨	0	0	0	0	1	2	0	X	3

=== Draw 5 ===
Friday, April 8, 7:30 pm

Sheet A	1	2	3	4	5	6	7	8	Final
Calissa Daly	0	1	0	0	1	0	2	0	4
Katelyn Wasylkiw 🔨	1	0	2	1	0	1	0	2	7

Sheet B	1	2	3	4	5	6	7	8	Final
Danielle Inglis 🔨	1	0	2	0	1	0	2	0	6
Carly Howard	0	2	0	2	0	3	0	1	8

Sheet C	1	2	3	4	5	6	7	8	Final
Susan Froud 🔨	0	0	1	1	0	0	1	0	3
Rachel Homan	1	1	0	0	1	1	0	1	5

Sheet D	1	2	3	4	5	6	7	8	Final
Team Duncan	0	0	1	2	4	2	X	X	9
Lauren Mann 🔨	0	3	0	0	0	0	X	X	3

=== Draw 6 ===
Saturday, April 9, 9:30 am

Sheet A	1	2	3	4	5	6	7	8	Final
Team Duncan	0	3	0	3	1	3	X	X	10
Carly Howard 🔨	2	0	1	0	0	0	X	X	3

Sheet B	1	2	3	4	5	6	7	8	Final
Rachel Homan 🔨	2	1	0	4	3	X	X	X	10
Calissa Daly	0	0	1	0	0	X	X	X	1

Sheet C	1	2	3	4	5	6	7	8	Final
Lauren Mann	0	0	2	0	0	0	0	X	2
Katelyn Wasylkiw 🔨	1	2	0	1	2	1	1	X	8

Sheet D	1	2	3	4	5	6	7	8	Final
Susan Froud 🔨	1	0	0	1	0	1	0	X	3
Danielle Inglis	0	2	2	0	2	0	1	X	7

=== Draw 7 ===
Saturday, April 9, 3:30 pm

Sheet A	1	2	3	4	5	6	7	8	Final
Susan Froud 🔨	0	0	2	0	3	1	X	X	6
Lauren Mann	1	1	0	1	0	0	X	X	3

Sheet B	1	2	3	4	5	6	7	8	Final
Danielle Inglis	1	2	0	1	0	1	1	1	7
Katelyn Wasylkiw 🔨	0	0	2	0	3	0	0	0	5

Sheet C	1	2	3	4	5	6	7	8	Final
Team Duncan 🔨	0	0	0	1	0	0	1	0	2
Rachel Homan	0	1	1	0	2	0	0	1	5

Sheet D	1	2	3	4	5	6	7	8	Final
Calissa Daly	0	0	2	0	0	2	0	0	4
Carly Howard 🔨	1	2	0	1	0	0	2	1	7

== Playoffs ==
Semifinal			Final
			1	Rachel Homan	6
2	Team Duncan	5	3	Carly Howard	4
3	Carly Howard	6

=== Semifinal ===
Sunday, April 10, 9:00 am

Sheet C	1	2	3	4	5	6	7	8	Final
Team Duncan 🔨	2	0	0	1	0	0	2	0	5
Carly Howard	0	2	1	0	2	0	0	1	6

=== Final ===
Sunday, April 10, 2:00 pm

Sheet B	1	2	3	4	5	6	7	8	Final
Rachel Homan 🔨	0	1	0	1	0	3	0	1	6
Carly Howard	0	0	1	0	1	0	2	0	4

2022 Ontario Scotties Tournament of Hearts

Rachel Homan
6th Ontario Provincial Championship title

== Qualification ==
=== Cash Spiel #1 ===
December 3–5, Mississaugua Golf & Country Club, Mississauga

A Event	Qualifier 1
Danielle Inglis (Dixie)	9
Quinn Walsh (Leaside)	5	Sierra Sutherland (Rideau)	3
Sierra Sutherland (Rideau)	10	Danielle Inglis (Dixie)	9
Susan Froud (Alliston)	8
Calissa Daly (Guelph)	3
Susan Froud (Alliston)	4
Danielle Inglis (Dixie)	8
Maddy Warriner (Dundas Valley)	2
Emily Deschenes (Manotick)	1
Shannon Jay (St. Thomas)	8
Shannon Jay (St. Thomas)	1
Maddy Warriner (Dundas Valley)	7
Chelsea Brandwood (Listowel)	5
Maddy Warriner (Dundas Valley)	6

A Event				Qualifier 2
Mackenzie Kiemele (Niagara Falls)	7
Katelyn Wasylkiw (Whitby)	9	Katelyn Wasylkiw (Whitby)	7
Cathy Auld (Thornhill)	7	Cathy Auld (Thornhill)	6
Kaitlin Jewer (London)	2			Katelyn Wasylkiw (Whitby)	7
Emma Wallingford (Cataraqui)	6			Rachel Steele (High Park)	2
Heather Heggestad (Thornhill)	5	Emma Wallingford (Cataraqui)	2
Rachel Steele (High Park)	7	Rachel Steele (High Park)	6
Lauren Mann (Ottawa)	3

B Event	Qualifier 3
Calissa Daly (Guelph)	6
Quinn Walsh (Leaside)	3	Lauren Mann (Ottawa)	4
Lauren Mann (Ottawa)	7	Calissa Daly (Guelph)	2
Emma Wallingford (Cataraqui)	5
Emma Wallingford (Cataraqui)	8
Maddy Warriner (Dundas Valley)	3

B Event	Qualifier 4
Emily Deschenes (Manotick)	7
Chelsea Brandwood (Listowel)	4	Emily Deschenes (Manotick)	5
Cathy Auld (Thornhill)	6
Cathy Auld (Thornhill)	5
Mackenzie Kiemele (Niagara Falls)	5	Shannon Jay (St. Thomas)	7
Kaitlin Jewer (London)	6	Kaitlin Jewer (London)	3
Shannon Jay (St. Thomas)	7

B Event				Qualifier 5
		Susan Froud (Alliston)	5
Sierra Sutherland (Rideau)	1	Heather Heggestad (Thornhill)	6
Heather Heggestad (Thornhill)	7			Heather Heggestad (Thornhill)	5
				Rachel Steele (High Park)	4

C Event				Qualifier 6
		Kaitlin Jewer (London)	9
Quinn Walsh (Leaside)	1	Mackenzie Kiemele (Niagara Falls)	2
Mackenzie Kiemele (Niagara Falls)	10			Kaitlin Jewer (London)	9
				Cathy Auld (Thornhill)	6

C Event				Qualifier 7
		Susan Froud (Alliston)	2
Sierra Sutherland (Rideau)	6	Lauren Mann (Ottawa)	8
Lauren Mann (Ottawa)	12			Lauren Mann (Ottawa)	10
				Maddy Warriner (Dundas Valley)	8

C Event		Qualifier 8
Emily Deschenes (Manotick)	7
Rachel Steele (High Park)	6	Emily Deschenes (Manotick)	3
Chelsea Brandwood (Listowel)	7	Chelsea Brandwood (Listowel)	6
Calissa Daly (Guelph)	6

Playoff Round
A1	Danielle Inglis (Dixie)	6
C3	Chelsea Brandwood (Listowel)	2
B1	Emma Wallingford (Cataraqui)	7
B2	Shannon Jay (St. Thomas)	2

To Provincials
A1	Danielle Inglis (Dixie)	8
B1	Emma Wallingford (Cataraqui)	7

Playoff Round
A2	Katelyn Wasylkiw (Whitby)	11
C1	Kaitlin Jewer (London)	2
B3	Heather Heggestad (Thornhill)	3
C2	Lauren Mann (Ottawa)	8

To Provincials
A2	Katelyn Wasylkiw (Whitby)	2
C2	Lauren Mann (Ottawa)	9

=== Open qualifier ===
December 18–19, 2021, Guelph Curling Club, Guelph

A Event				To Provincials
		Katelyn Wasylkiw (Whitby)	5
Emma Wallingford (Cataraqui)	4	Calissa Daly (Guelph)	10
Calissa Daly (Guelph)	6			Calissa Daly (Guelph)	9
Cathy Auld (Thornhill)	8			Heather Heggestad (Thornhill)	7
Mackenzie Kiemele (Niagara Falls)	6	Cathy Auld (Thornhill)	3
		Heather Heggestad (Thornhill)	8

A Event	To Provincials
Shannon Jay (St. Thomas)	6
Parker Doig (Dixie)	5	Shannon Jay (St. Thomas)	7
Chelsea Brandwood (Listowel)	6	Chelsea Brandwood (Listowel)	6
Amanda Gebhardt (Guelph)	4	Shannon Jay (St. Thomas)	6
Susan Froud (Alliston)	11	Susan Froud (Alliston)	7
Madelyn Warriner (Dundas Valley)	5	Susan Froud (Alliston)	6
Rachel Homan (Ottawa)	5

B Event	To Provincials
Katelyn Wasylkiw (Whitby)	9
Parker Doig (Dixie)	6	Amanda Gebhardt (Guelph)	2
Amanda Gebhardt (Guelph)	7	Katelyn Wasylkiw (Whitby)	10
Madelyn Warriner (Dundas Valley)	8
Madelyn Warriner (Dundas Valley)	10
Cathy Auld (Thornhill)	5
Katelyn Wasylkiw (Whitby)	8
Shannon Jay (St. Thomas)	1
Katelyn Wasylkiw (Whitby)	1
Rachel Homan (Ottawa)	8
Heather Heggestad (Thornhill)	6
Rachel Homan (Ottawa)	15
Emma Wallingford (Cataraqui)	11
Chelsea Brandwood (Listowel)	3
Emma Wallingford (Cataraqui)	5
Rachel Homan (Ottawa)	6
Mackenzie Kiemele (Niagara Falls)	6
Rachel Homan (Ottawa)	8
