= 2018 Ontario Scotties Tournament of Hearts =

- Host city: Whitby, Ontario
- Arena: Whitby Curling Club
- Dates: January 10–14
- Winner: Team Duncan
- Curling club: Royal Canadian Curling Club
- Skip: Hollie Duncan
- Third: Stephanie LeDrew
- Second: Cheryl Kreviazuk
- Lead: Karen Sagle
- Finalist: Danielle Inglis

The 2018 Ontario Scotties Tournament of Hearts, the provincial women's curling championship for Southern Ontario, was held January 10 to 14 at the Whitby Curling Club in Whitby, Ontario. The winning team represented Ontario at the 2018 Scotties Tournament of Hearts in Penticton, British Columbia.

The defending champion Rachel Homan rink from Ottawa represented Canada at the 2018 Winter Olympics, and thus will not have the opportunity to defend their provincial crown. Had they not qualified for the Olympics, they still would not have had a chance to defend their title, as they would have represented Team Canada at the 2018 Scotties Tournament of Hearts.

The event had a triple knock out format, rather than the traditional round robin event as was done in previous years. The number of qualified teams increased from 8 to 12.

== Qualification Process ==
12 teams qualified from two regional qualifiers (three each), a challenge round (three teams), the winner of the Trophy competition, plus the top two southern Ontario teams in the CTRS standings (as of November 12).

| Qualification method | Berths | Qualifying Team |
|---|---|---|
| CTRS leaders | 2 | Sherry Middaugh; Julie Tippin |
| East Qualifier | 3 | Allison Flaxey; Hailey Armstrong; Danielle Inglis |
| West Qualifier | 3 | Jacqueline Harrison; Cathy Auld; Katelyn Wasylkiw |
| Challenge Round | 3 | Heather Heggestad; Hollie Duncan; Kirsten Marshall |
| Trophy Champion | 1 | Chrissy Cadorin |

== Teams ==
The team lineups are as follows:

| Skip | Third | Second | Lead | Alternate | Club(s) |
|---|---|---|---|---|---|
| Hailey Armstrong | Erica Hopson | Lynsey Longfield | Emma Malfara | | Rideau CC, Ottawa |
| Cathy Auld | Lori Eddy | Katie Cottrill | Jenna Humphrey | | Listowel CC, Listowel |
| Chrissy Cadorin | Joanne Curtis | Julia Weagle | Sarah Jagger | | Royal Canadian CC, Toronto |
| Hollie Duncan | Stephanie LeDrew | Cheryl Kreviazuk | Karen Sagle | | Royal Canadian CC, Toronto |
| Allison Flaxey | Clancy Grandy | Lynn Kreviazuk | Morgan Court | | The Granite Club, North York, Toronto |
| Jacqueline Harrison | Janet Murphy | Stephanie Matheson | Melissa Foster | | Mississaugua G&CC, Mississauga |
| Heather Heggestad | Ginger Coyle | Michelle Laidlaw | Lauren Harrison | | Oakville CC, Oakville |
| Danielle Inglis | Jessica Corrado | Stephanie Corrado | Cassandra de Groot | | Dixie CC, Mississauga |
| Kirsten Marshall | Terri Weeks | Nicole Titkai | Emily Lloyd | | Toronto Cricket, North York, Toronto |
| Sherry Middaugh | Jo-Ann Rizzo | Lee Merklinger | Leigh Armstrong | Kimberly Tuck | Coldwater & District CC, Coldwater |
| Julie Tippin | Chantal Duhaime | Rachelle Vink | Tess Bobbie | | Woodstock CC, Woodstock |
| Katelyn Wasylkiw | Lauren Wasylkiw | Stephanie Thompson | Katrina Sale | | Unionville CC, Unionville |

== Knockout Draw Brackets ==
The draw is listed as follows:

=== A Event ===
First Knockout
Heather Heggestad | 7
Hollie Duncan | 5
Chrissy Cadorin | 7
Kirsten Marshall | 2
Katelyn Wasylkiw | 5
Cathy Auld | 6
Danielle Inglis | 8
Hailey Armstrong | 3

Quarterfinals
Julie Tippin | 6
Heather Heggestad | 7
Chrissy Cadorin | 4
Allison Flaxey | 8
Jacqueline Harrison | 10
Cathy Auld | 4
Danielle Inglis | 8
Sherry Middaugh | 4

Semifinals
Heather Heggestad | 2
Allison Flaxey | 9
Jacqueline Harrison | 6
Danielle Inglis | 8

Qualifier 1
Allison Flaxey | 3
Danielle Inglis | 6

=== B Event ===
Second Knockout
Hollie Duncan | 5
Chrissy Cadorin | 10
Hailey Armstrong | 7
Cathy Auld | 8
Katelyn Wasylkiw | 4
Sherry Middaugh | 9
Kirsten Marshall | 5
Julie Tippin | 8

Quarterfinals
Chrissy Cadorin | 6
Jacqueline Harrison | 7
Cathy Auld | 11
Heather Heggestad | 9
Sherry Middaugh | 5
Julie Tippin | 6

Semifinals
Jacqueline Harrison | 3
Cathy Auld | 9
Julie Tippin | 4
Allison Flaxey | 10

Qualifier 2
Cathy Auld | 9
Allison Flaxey | 4

=== C Event ===
| Third Knockout | | Semifinals | | Qualifier 3 |
| | | Hollie Duncan | 8 |
| Hollie Duncan | 9 | Julie Tippin | 4 |
| Hailey Armstrong | 6 | | | Hollie Duncan | 6 |
| | | | | Jacqueline Harrison | 5 |
| | | Sherry Middaugh | 4 |
| | | Jacqueline Harrison | 5 |

| Third Knockout | | Semifinals | | Qualifier 4 |
| Katelyn Wasylkiw | 4 |
| Chrissy Cadorin | 9 | Chrissy Cadorin | 2 |
| Kirsten Marshall | 6 | Heather Heggestad | 5 |
| Heather Heggestad | 7 | | | Heather Heggestad | 7 |
| | | | | Allison Flaxey | 6 |

== Scores ==
=== Draw 1 ===
January 10, 7:30pm

| Team | 1 | 2 | 3 | 4 | 5 | 6 | 7 | 8 | 9 | 10 | Final |
|---|---|---|---|---|---|---|---|---|---|---|---|
| Chrissy Cadorin 🔨 | 2 | 0 | 0 | 1 | 0 | 2 | 1 | 1 | X | X | 7 |
| Kirsten Marshall | 0 | 0 | 0 | 0 | 2 | 0 | 0 | 0 | X | X | 2 |

| Team | 1 | 2 | 3 | 4 | 5 | 6 | 7 | 8 | 9 | 10 | Final |
|---|---|---|---|---|---|---|---|---|---|---|---|
| Cathy Auld | 1 | 1 | 1 | 0 | 2 | 0 | 0 | 1 | 0 | 0 | 6 |
| Katelyn Wasylkiw 🔨 | 0 | 0 | 0 | 1 | 0 | 2 | 0 | 0 | 1 | 1 | 5 |

| Team | 1 | 2 | 3 | 4 | 5 | 6 | 7 | 8 | 9 | 10 | Final |
|---|---|---|---|---|---|---|---|---|---|---|---|
| Danielle Inglis | 0 | 0 | 1 | 2 | 0 | 3 | 0 | 2 | X | X | 8 |
| Hailey Armstrong 🔨 | 0 | 1 | 0 | 0 | 1 | 0 | 1 | 0 | X | X | 3 |

| Team | 1 | 2 | 3 | 4 | 5 | 6 | 7 | 8 | 9 | 10 | Final |
|---|---|---|---|---|---|---|---|---|---|---|---|
| Hollie Duncan 🔨 | 1 | 0 | 0 | 2 | 0 | 0 | 0 | 1 | 1 | 0 | 5 |
| Heather Heggestad | 0 | 0 | 2 | 0 | 0 | 3 | 0 | 0 | 0 | 2 | 7 |

=== Draw 2 ===
January 11, 9:30am

| Team | 1 | 2 | 3 | 4 | 5 | 6 | 7 | 8 | 9 | 10 | Final |
|---|---|---|---|---|---|---|---|---|---|---|---|
| Jacqueline Harrison 🔨 | 0 | 3 | 0 | 1 | 0 | 2 | 0 | 2 | 2 | X | 10 |
| Cathy Auld | 0 | 0 | 2 | 0 | 1 | 0 | 1 | 0 | 0 | X | 4 |

| Team | 1 | 2 | 3 | 4 | 5 | 6 | 7 | 8 | 9 | 10 | Final |
|---|---|---|---|---|---|---|---|---|---|---|---|
| Danielle Inglis 🔨 | 2 | 2 | 0 | 1 | 0 | 1 | 0 | 1 | 1 | X | 8 |
| Sherry Middaugh | 0 | 0 | 1 | 0 | 2 | 0 | 1 | 0 | 0 | X | 4 |

| Team | 1 | 2 | 3 | 4 | 5 | 6 | 7 | 8 | 9 | 10 | Final |
|---|---|---|---|---|---|---|---|---|---|---|---|
| Julie Tippin | 0 | 0 | 1 | 0 | 0 | 0 | 0 | 2 | 2 | 1 | 6 |
| Heather Heggestad 🔨 | 0 | 0 | 0 | 0 | 4 | 2 | 1 | 0 | 0 | 0 | 7 |

| Team | 1 | 2 | 3 | 4 | 5 | 6 | 7 | 8 | 9 | 10 | Final |
|---|---|---|---|---|---|---|---|---|---|---|---|
| Chrissy Cadorin 🔨 | 1 | 0 | 0 | 2 | 0 | 1 | 0 | 0 | 0 | X | 4 |
| Allison Flaxey | 0 | 2 | 1 | 0 | 0 | 0 | 2 | 2 | 1 | X | 8 |

=== Draw 3 ===
January 11, 2:30pm

| Team | 1 | 2 | 3 | 4 | 5 | 6 | 7 | 8 | 9 | 10 | Final |
|---|---|---|---|---|---|---|---|---|---|---|---|
| Hollie Duncan 🔨 | 0 | 0 | 2 | 0 | 0 | 1 | 0 | 2 | 0 | X | 5 |
| Chrissy Cadorin | 0 | 2 | 0 | 3 | 1 | 0 | 2 | 0 | 2 | X | 10 |

| Team | 1 | 2 | 3 | 4 | 5 | 6 | 7 | 8 | 9 | 10 | Final |
|---|---|---|---|---|---|---|---|---|---|---|---|
| Cathy Auld | 4 | 0 | 2 | 0 | 0 | 1 | 0 | 1 | 0 | 0 | 8 |
| Hailey Armstrong 🔨 | 0 | 0 | 0 | 2 | 1 | 0 | 2 | 0 | 1 | 1 | 7 |

| Team | 1 | 2 | 3 | 4 | 5 | 6 | 7 | 8 | 9 | 10 | Final |
|---|---|---|---|---|---|---|---|---|---|---|---|
| Katelyn Wasylkiw | 1 | 2 | 0 | 0 | 0 | 1 | 0 | 0 | 0 | X | 4 |
| Sherry Middaugh 🔨 | 0 | 0 | 2 | 3 | 1 | 0 | 0 | 0 | 3 | X | 9 |

| Team | 1 | 2 | 3 | 4 | 5 | 6 | 7 | 8 | 9 | 10 | Final |
|---|---|---|---|---|---|---|---|---|---|---|---|
| Kirsten Marshall | 0 | 0 | 1 | 0 | 0 | 2 | 0 | 1 | 1 | 0 | 5 |
| Julie Tippin 🔨 | 0 | 0 | 0 | 2 | 1 | 0 | 4 | 0 | 0 | 1 | 8 |

=== Draw 4 ===
January 11, 7:30pm

| Team | 1 | 2 | 3 | 4 | 5 | 6 | 7 | 8 | 9 | 10 | Final |
|---|---|---|---|---|---|---|---|---|---|---|---|
| Heather Heggestad | 0 | 0 | 0 | 0 | 0 | 2 | 0 | 0 | X | X | 2 |
| Allison Flaxey 🔨 | 1 | 1 | 0 | 1 | 1 | 0 | 3 | 2 | X | X | 9 |

| Team | 1 | 2 | 3 | 4 | 5 | 6 | 7 | 8 | 9 | 10 | Final |
|---|---|---|---|---|---|---|---|---|---|---|---|
| Jacqueline Harrison | 0 | 2 | 0 | 0 | 1 | 0 | 1 | 0 | 2 | 0 | 6 |
| Danielle Inglis 🔨 | 1 | 0 | 1 | 1 | 0 | 3 | 0 | 1 | 0 | 1 | 8 |

| Team | 1 | 2 | 3 | 4 | 5 | 6 | 7 | 8 | 9 | 10 | Final |
|---|---|---|---|---|---|---|---|---|---|---|---|
| Hollie Duncan | 0 | 3 | 1 | 0 | 1 | 0 | 0 | 1 | 3 | X | 9 |
| Hailey Armstrong 🔨 | 2 | 0 | 0 | 2 | 0 | 1 | 1 | 0 | 0 | X | 6 |

=== Draw 5 ===
January 12, 9:30am

| Team | 1 | 2 | 3 | 4 | 5 | 6 | 7 | 8 | 9 | 10 | Final |
|---|---|---|---|---|---|---|---|---|---|---|---|
| Allison Flaxey 🔨 | 0 | 1 | 0 | 1 | 0 | 0 | 0 | 1 | 0 | 0 | 3 |
| Danielle Inglis | 0 | 0 | 2 | 0 | 0 | 2 | 0 | 0 | 1 | 1 | 6 |

| Team | 1 | 2 | 3 | 4 | 5 | 6 | 7 | 8 | 9 | 10 | Final |
|---|---|---|---|---|---|---|---|---|---|---|---|
| Chrissy Cadorin 🔨 | 1 | 0 | 2 | 0 | 0 | 1 | 0 | 1 | 0 | 1 | 6 |
| Jacqueline Harrison | 0 | 3 | 0 | 1 | 0 | 0 | 1 | 0 | 2 | 0 | 7 |

| Team | 1 | 2 | 3 | 4 | 5 | 6 | 7 | 8 | 9 | 10 | Final |
|---|---|---|---|---|---|---|---|---|---|---|---|
| Cathy Auld | 0 | 0 | 2 | 0 | 3 | 0 | 1 | 0 | 2 | 3 | 11 |
| Heather Heggestad 🔨 | 3 | 1 | 0 | 1 | 0 | 2 | 0 | 2 | 0 | 0 | 9 |

| Team | 1 | 2 | 3 | 4 | 5 | 6 | 7 | 8 | 9 | 10 | Final |
|---|---|---|---|---|---|---|---|---|---|---|---|
| Sherry Middaugh | 0 | 1 | 0 | 1 | 0 | 0 | 1 | 0 | 2 | 0 | 5 |
| Julie Tippin 🔨 | 0 | 0 | 1 | 0 | 0 | 2 | 0 | 1 | 0 | 2 | 6 |

=== Draw 6 ===
January 12, 2:30pm

| Team | 1 | 2 | 3 | 4 | 5 | 6 | 7 | 8 | 9 | 10 | Final |
|---|---|---|---|---|---|---|---|---|---|---|---|
| Jacqueline Harrison | 0 | 0 | 2 | 0 | 1 | 0 | 0 | X | X | X | 3 |
| Cathy Auld 🔨 | 1 | 3 | 0 | 1 | 0 | 2 | 2 | X | X | X | 9 |

| Team | 1 | 2 | 3 | 4 | 5 | 6 | 7 | 8 | 9 | 10 | Final |
|---|---|---|---|---|---|---|---|---|---|---|---|
| Julie Tippin | 0 | 0 | 0 | 1 | 2 | 0 | 1 | 0 | X | X | 4 |
| Allison Flaxey 🔨 | 0 | 4 | 1 | 0 | 0 | 2 | 0 | 3 | X | X | 10 |

| Team | 1 | 2 | 3 | 4 | 5 | 6 | 7 | 8 | 9 | 10 | Final |
|---|---|---|---|---|---|---|---|---|---|---|---|
| Katelyn Wasylkiw | 0 | 0 | 0 | 2 | 0 | 0 | 0 | 2 | 0 | X | 4 |
| Chrissy Cadorin 🔨 | 0 | 2 | 1 | 0 | 0 | 0 | 5 | 0 | 1 | X | 9 |

| Team | 1 | 2 | 3 | 4 | 5 | 6 | 7 | 8 | 9 | 10 | 11 | Final |
|---|---|---|---|---|---|---|---|---|---|---|---|---|
| Kristen Marshall 🔨 | 0 | 0 | 0 | 3 | 0 | 1 | 0 | 2 | 0 | 0 | 0 | 6 |
| Heather Heggestad | 0 | 1 | 0 | 0 | 0 | 0 | 2 | 0 | 2 | 1 | 1 | 7 |

=== Draw 7 ===
January 12, 7:30pm

| Team | 1 | 2 | 3 | 4 | 5 | 6 | 7 | 8 | 9 | 10 | Final |
|---|---|---|---|---|---|---|---|---|---|---|---|
| Cathy Auld 🔨 | 1 | 0 | 0 | 1 | 1 | 0 | 4 | 2 | X | X | 9 |
| Allison Flaxey | 0 | 0 | 2 | 0 | 0 | 2 | 0 | 0 | X | X | 4 |

| Team | 1 | 2 | 3 | 4 | 5 | 6 | 7 | 8 | 9 | 10 | Final |
|---|---|---|---|---|---|---|---|---|---|---|---|
| Hollie Duncan 🔨 | 0 | 3 | 0 | 1 | 0 | 0 | 1 | 0 | 3 | X | 8 |
| Julie Tippin | 0 | 0 | 2 | 0 | 0 | 1 | 0 | 1 | 0 | X | 4 |

| Team | 1 | 2 | 3 | 4 | 5 | 6 | 7 | 8 | 9 | 10 | Final |
|---|---|---|---|---|---|---|---|---|---|---|---|
| Sherry Middaugh 🔨 | 0 | 0 | 0 | 0 | 1 | 0 | 1 | 0 | 1 | 1 | 4 |
| Jacqueline Harrison | 0 | 1 | 2 | 0 | 0 | 1 | 0 | 1 | 0 | 0 | 5 |

| Team | 1 | 2 | 3 | 4 | 5 | 6 | 7 | 8 | 9 | 10 | Final |
|---|---|---|---|---|---|---|---|---|---|---|---|
| Chrissy Cadorin | 1 | 0 | 1 | 0 | 0 | 0 | 0 | 0 | 0 | X | 2 |
| Heather Heggestad 🔨 | 0 | 2 | 0 | 0 | 0 | 1 | 0 | 1 | 1 | X | 5 |

=== Draw 8 ===
January 13, 10:00am

| Team | 1 | 2 | 3 | 4 | 5 | 6 | 7 | 8 | 9 | 10 | Final |
|---|---|---|---|---|---|---|---|---|---|---|---|
| Hollie Duncan 🔨 | 1 | 0 | 0 | 0 | 2 | 0 | 0 | 1 | 0 | 2 | 6 |
| Jacqueline Harrison | 0 | 1 | 0 | 0 | 0 | 1 | 1 | 0 | 2 | 0 | 5 |

| Team | 1 | 2 | 3 | 4 | 5 | 6 | 7 | 8 | 9 | 10 | 11 | Final |
|---|---|---|---|---|---|---|---|---|---|---|---|---|
| Heather Heggestad 🔨 | 1 | 0 | 3 | 0 | 0 | 1 | 0 | 0 | 1 | 0 | 1 | 7 |
| Allison Flaxey | 0 | 1 | 0 | 0 | 0 | 0 | 1 | 2 | 0 | 2 | 0 | 6 |

== Playoffs ==
Page playoff system
A | Danielle Inglis | 8
B | Cathy Auld | 5
C1 | Hollie Duncan | 5
C2 | Heather Heggestad | 4

Semifinal
B | Cathy Auld | 5
C1 | Hollie Duncan | 11

Final
A | Danielle Inglis | 7
C1 | Hollie Duncan | 10

=== A vs B ===
Saturday, January 13, 3:00pm

| Team | 1 | 2 | 3 | 4 | 5 | 6 | 7 | 8 | 9 | 10 | Final |
|---|---|---|---|---|---|---|---|---|---|---|---|
| Danielle Inglis 🔨 | 1 | 0 | 1 | 0 | 2 | 2 | 0 | 0 | 2 | X | 8 |
| Cathy Auld | 0 | 2 | 0 | 1 | 0 | 0 | 0 | 2 | 0 | X | 5 |

=== C1 vs C2 ===
Saturday, January 13, 7:00pm

| Team | 1 | 2 | 3 | 4 | 5 | 6 | 7 | 8 | 9 | 10 | Final |
|---|---|---|---|---|---|---|---|---|---|---|---|
| Hollie Duncan | 0 | 0 | 1 | 1 | 0 | 1 | 0 | 1 | 0 | 1 | 5 |
| Heather Heggestad 🔨 | 0 | 1 | 0 | 0 | 1 | 0 | 0 | 0 | 2 | 0 | 4 |

=== Semifinal ===
Sunday, January 14, 9:30am

| Team | 1 | 2 | 3 | 4 | 5 | 6 | 7 | 8 | 9 | 10 | Final |
|---|---|---|---|---|---|---|---|---|---|---|---|
| Cathy Auld 🔨 | 1 | 0 | 0 | 1 | 0 | 2 | 0 | 1 | X | X | 5 |
| Hollie Duncan | 0 | 3 | 2 | 0 | 3 | 0 | 3 | 0 | X | X | 11 |

=== Final ===
Sunday, January 14, 2:30 pm

| Team | 1 | 2 | 3 | 4 | 5 | 6 | 7 | 8 | 9 | 10 | Final |
|---|---|---|---|---|---|---|---|---|---|---|---|
| Danielle Inglis 🔨 | 1 | 0 | 0 | 2 | 0 | 2 | 0 | 0 | 2 | 0 | 7 |
| Hollie Duncan | 0 | 2 | 2 | 0 | 0 | 0 | 4 | 1 | 0 | 1 | 10 |

2018 Ontario Scotties Tournament of Hearts

Hollie Duncan
1st Ontario Provincial Championship title

== Qualification ==
East and west regional qualifiers will run November 24–27, 2017. Two teams from each region qualify.

=== East Qualifier ===
November 24–27 at the Lindsay Curling Club, Lindsay

Teams entered:

- Kristina Adams (Peterborough)
- Hailey Armstrong (Rideau)
- Chrissy Cadorin (Royal Canadian)
- Hollie Duncan (Royal Canadian)
- Allison Flaxey (Granite)
- Susan Froud (Westmount)
- Jaime Gardner (Listowel)
- Danielle Inglis (Dixie)
- Cassandra Lewin (RCMP)
- Erin Macaulay (Rideau)
- Angie Melaney (Lindsay)
- Erin Morrissey (Ottawa)
- Brittany Pearce (Penetanguishene)

Brackets:

A side
Jaimee Gardner | 6
**Erin Macaulay** | **9**
Angie Melaney | 2
**Susan Froud** | **5**
Kristina Adams | 2
**Hollie Duncan** | **8**
**Danielle Inglis** | **10**
Brittany Pearce | 2
**Hailey Armstrong** | **7**
Cassandra Lewin | 1

Quarterfinal
**Allison Flaxey** | **8**
Erin Macaulay | 6
**Susan Froud** | **8**
Hollie Duncan | 7
**Danielle Inglis** | **8**
Hailey Armstrong | 5
**Chrissy Cadorin** | **9**
Erin Morrissey | 3

Semifinal
**Allison Flaxey** | **6**
Susan Froud | 4
**Danielle Inglis** | **6**
Chrissy Cadorin | 4

**A Final**
**Allison Flaxey** | **8**
Danielle Inglis | 6

| B Side (Top half) | | Semifinals | | Finals |
| | | Cassandra Lewin | 3 |
| Brittany Pearce | 4 | **Erin Macaulay** | **7** |
| **Cassandra Lewin** | **6** | | | **Hollie Duncan** | **10** |
| | | | | Erin Macaulay | 4 |

| B Side (bottom half) | | Semifinal | | Finals |
| | | **Hailey Armstrong** | **8** |
| | | Jaimee Gardner | 7 |
| | | | | **Hailey Armstrong** | **5** |
| **Angie Melaney** | **9** | | | Erin Morrissey | 4 |
| Kristina Adams | 3 | Angie Melaney | 6 |
| | | **Erin Morrissey** | **10** |

| B Side | | Semifinal | | **B Final** |
| | | | | Danielle Inglis | 5 |
| Hollie Duncan | 5 | | | **Hailey Armstrong** | **6** |
| **Chrissy Cadorin** | **11** | Chrissy Cadorin | 6 |
| **Hailey Armstrong** | **8** | **Hailey Armstrong** | **9** |
| Susan Froud | 6 |

| C Side (Top half) | | Semifinals | | Finals |
| | | Brittany Pearce | 1 |
| Kristina Adams | 2 | **Erin Macaulay** | **8** |
| **Brittany Pearce** | **7** | | | Susan Froud | 4 |
| | | | | **Erin Macaulay** | **8** |

| C Side (bottom half) | | Semifinal |
| Jaimee Gardner | 7 |
| **Erin Morrissey** | **9** | **Cassandra Lewin** | **7** |
| Angie Melaney | 3 | Erin Morrissey | 6 |
| **Cassandra Lewin** | **12** |

| C Side | | Semifinal | | **C Final** |
| | | | | Chrissy Cadorin | 5 |
| **Chrissy Cadorin** | **9** | | | **Danielle Inglis** | **8** |
| Erin Macaulay | 1 | **Chrissy Cadorin** | **4** |
| **Hollie Duncan** | **10** | Hollie Duncan | 3 |
| Cassandra Lewin | 5 |

=== West Qualifier ===
November 25-26, 2017 at the St. Thomas Curling Club, St. Thomas

Teams entered:

- Cathy Auld (Listowel)
- Jacqueline Harrison (Mississaugua)
- Heather Heggestad (Oakville)
- Katelyn Wasylkiw (Unionville)

Brackets:

| A side | | A Final |
| **Jacqueline Harrison** | **6** |
| Katelyn Wasylkiw | 4 | **Jacqueline Harrison** | **6** |
| **Cathy Auld** | **7** | Cathy Auld | 3 |
| Heather Heggestad | 4 |

| B side | | B Final |
| **Heather Heggestad** | **9** |
| Katelyn Wasylkiw | 4 | Heather Heggestad | 6 |
| | | **Cathy Auld** | **7** |

| C Final |
| **Katelyn Wasylkiw** | **5** |
| Heather Heggestad | 4 |

=== Trophy Championship ===
December 6-10 at the Midland Curling Club, Midland

Qualified teams:

- Colleen Madonia (Thornhill)
- Kelly Cochrane (High Park)
- Kristy Russell (Elora)
- Patricia Bandurka (Dixie)
- Angie Melaney (Lindsay)
- Dawn Butler (Rideau)
- Brenna Cochrane (High Park)
- Chrissy Cadorin (Royal Canadian)

Standings

| Team | W | L |
|---|---|---|
| Cadorin | 6 | 1 |
| K. Cochrane | 6 | 1 |
| Russell | 5 | 2 |
| Madonia | 4 | 3 |
| Bandurka | 2 | 5 |
| Butler | 2 | 5 |
| B. Cochrane | 2 | 5 |
| Melaney | 1 | 6 |

- Tie-breaker: **Cadorin** 5-2 K. Cochrane

==== Regional qualifiers ====
Qualifiers in bold. Two teams qualify from each event for the provincial Trophy Championship.

===== Qualifier 1 =====
November 17-19, Gananoque Curling Club, Gananoque

Teams entered:

- **Dawn Butler** (Rideau)
- **Brenna Cochrane** (High Park)

===== Qualifier 2 =====
November 17-19, Port Perry Community Curling Club, Port Perry

Teams entered:

- **Angie Melaney** (Lindsay)
- Ashley Waye (Royal Canadian)
- **Colleen Madonia** (Thornhill)
- Wendy Finlday (Lindsay)

===== Qualifier 3 =====
November 18, Penetanguishene Curling Club, Penetanguishene

Teams entered:

- Brittany Pearce (Penetanguishene)
- **Chrissy Cadorin** (Royal Canadian)
- **Kelly Cochrane** (High Park)

===== Qualifier 4 =====
November 17-19, St. Marys Curling Club, St. Marys

Teams entered:

- Amie Shackleton (St. Marys)
- **Kristy Russell** (Elora)
- Michelle Roach (Hamilton Victoria)
- **Patricia Bandurka** (Dixie)
- Sheri Smeltzer (Fergus)
- Twyla Gilbert (Elmira)

=== Challenge Round ===
December 15, 2017 at the Leaside Curling Club, East York, Toronto

New teams:

- Kirsten Marshall (Toronto Cricket)

| A event | | Semifinals | | Qualifier 1 |
| | | **Hollie Duncan** | **9** |
| Erin Macaulay | 6 | Ashley Waye | 4 |
| **Ashley Waye** | **7** | | | Hollie Duncan | 4 |
| **Heather Heggestad** | **9** | | | **Heather Heggestad** | **8** |
| Erin Morrissey | 7 | **Heather Heggestad** | **6** |
| **Susan Froud** | **8** | Susan Froud | 5 |
| Kirsten Marshall | 0 |

B event
**Kirsten Marshall** | **8**
Erin Morrissey | 3

Quarterfinal
Ashley Waye | 4
**Kirsten Marshall** | **8**
Susan Froud | 5
**Erin Macaulay** | **10**

Semifinal
**Kirsten Marshall** | **10**
Erin Macaulay | 4

**B Final**
**Hollie Duncan** | **8**
Kirsten Marshall | 6

| C event | | Quarterfinal | | Semifinal | | **C Final** |
| | | | | **Susan Froud** | **6** |
| Erin Morrissey | 4 | | | Erin Macaulay | 3 |
| **Susan Froud** | **5** | Ashley Waye | 4 |
| | | **Susan Froud** | **8** |
| | | | | | | Susan Froud | 2 |
| | | | | | | **Kirsten Marshall** | **3** |
