= Katelyn Wasylkiw =

Canadian curler

- Curler
- Born: 1993 (age 32–33); Toronto, Ontario, Canada

Team
- Curling club: Whitby CC; Whitby, ON
- Skip: Katelyn Wasylkiw
- Third: Sarah Bailey
- Second: Stephanie Thompson
- Lead: Lauren Wasylkiw

Curling career
- Member Association: Ontario
- Top CTRS ranking: 36th (2021–22)

Katelyn Wasylkiw (/wəˈsɪlki/; born 1993) is a Canadian curler from Kleinburg, Ontario. She currently skips her own team out of Unionville, Ontario.

== Career ==
In 2010, she was third on Chantal Duhaime's team, before becoming lead on Caitlin Romain's team in 2011 and then lead on Jamie Sinclair's team in 2012. Then third on Jaimee Gardner's team in 2013, second on Jacqueline Harrison's team in 2014 and then second on Brenda Holloway's team in 2016.

From 2017–present she has been skip of Team Wasylkiw which consists of her sister Lauren Wasylkiw as third, Stephanie Thompson as second and Erin Way, formerly Katrina Sale as lead. The team came runner-up in the Listowel Women's Classic in 2017, losing to Cathy Auld's team. The team competed in the 2018 Ontario Scotties Tournament of Hearts, in which they lost all three matches. In 2019, the team won the Part II Bistro Ladies Classic.

Wasylkiw didn't make it to provincials again until 2022, where her team was selected to play, replacing Team Jacqueline Harrison, which dropped out from the postponed event. The team finished the event with a 4–3 record, just missing the playoffs. The team made it to provincials again in 2023, where Wasylkiw led her team to a 2–3 record.

== Personal life ==
Wasylkiw's sister is curler Lauren Wasylkiw who plays lead on her team.
