= Danielle Inglis =

Canadian curler (born 1988)

- Curler
- Born: February 26, 1988 (age 38); Toronto, Ontario, Canada

Team
- Curling club: Ottawa Hunt Club, Ottawa, ON
- Skip: Danielle Inglis
- Third: Jo-Ann Rizzo
- Second: Geri-Lynn Ramsay
- Lead: Joanne Tarvit

Curling career
- Member Association: Ontario
- Hearts: 4 (2018, 2021, 2024, 2025)
- Top CTRS ranking: 7th (2023–24)
Medal record
Curling
Representing Canada
World Mixed Curling Championship
Gold medal – first place	2018 Kelowna
Winter Universiade
Silver medal – second place	2009 Harbin
Representing Ontario
Scotties Tournament of Hearts
Silver medal – second place	2021 Calgary

Danielle Inglis (born February 26, 1988) is a Canadian curler from Whitby, Ontario. She currently skips her own team.

== Career ==
=== Juniors ===
As a junior curler, Inglis and her Burlington Curling Club rink of Chantal Lalonde, Tracy O'Leary and Pam Feldkamp won the 2008 Pepsi Ontario Junior Curling Championships, upsetting the Rachel Homan rink in the final. The team represented Ontario at the 2008 Canadian Junior Curling Championships, finishing with a 6-6 record, out of the playoffs.

=== Women's ===
After juniors, Inglis joined the Hollie Nicol rink, playing third. Inglis and Nicol added Kirsten Wall as skip in 2010, bumping Inglis to second on the team, which also added Jill Brothers at lead. The rink played in the 2010 Sobeys Slam that season, finishing with a 3-3 record. In 2012 Wall left the rink, and was replaced as skip by Brothers. The team would play in their first provincial championship at the 2013 Ontario Scotties Tournament of Hearts. The team finished with a 3-6 record. After that season, Brothers left the rink and Nicol resumed skipping the team once again. The team played in the 2014 Ontario Scotties Tournament of Hearts, finishing with a 2-7 record. Inglis left the team after the season, forming a new rink as skip with teammates Shannon Harrington, Cassandra de Groot and Kiri Campbell. The team made it to the 2015 Ontario Scotties Tournament of Hearts, where they went 3–6.

Inglis won the 2018 Canadian Mixed Curling Championship (held in November 2017), playing third for Team Ontario, which was skipped by Mike Anderson and went on to win the 2018 World Mixed Curling Championship.

Inglis did not make it to another provincial championship until 2018 with teammates Jessica Corrado, Stephanie Corrado and de Groot. There, she made it to the final where she lost against Hollie Duncan. Inglis was invited to play alternate and coach the team at the 2018 Scotties Tournament of Hearts, Canada's national women's curling championship. Team Inglis qualified for the 2020 Ontario Scotties Tournament of Hearts, where she lost to Duncan in the semifinal.

Inglis was invited to be the alternate on Team Ontario (skipped by Rachel Homan) at the 2021 Scotties Tournament of Hearts. Inglis threw four rocks in two games at the event. The team made it to the final, where they lost to Kerri Einarson, representing Team Canada.

Team Inglis played in the 2021 Canadian Olympic Curling Pre-Trials, where she led her team to a 2–4 record, failing to make the playoffs. The team played in the postponed 2022 Ontario Scotties Tournament of Hearts with Kim Tuck replacing Jessica Corrado at third. Inglis led the team to a 3–4 record, failing to advance.

For the 2022–23 curling season, the Corrados left the team, and were replaced by Kira Brunton at third and Cheryl Kreviazuk at second. The team's success on tour qualified them for the 2023 Ontario Scotties Tournament of Hearts, where she again lost to Hollie Duncan in the semifinal. Following the season, Kreviazuk was replaced at second by Calissa Daly. The team played in the 2023 PointsBet Invitational, where they lost in the "Sweep 16". The team qualified again for the 2024 Ontario Scotties Tournament of Hearts, where she won her first ever provincial women's championship, defeating Carly Howard 8–7 in the final, and represented Ontario at the 2024 Scotties Tournament of Hearts. At the Hearts, she led her rink to a 3–5 record, missing the playoffs. Later that year, the team played in the 2024 PointsBet Invitational, where the team lost to Skrlik again in the Sweep 16. Later that season, the team played in the 2025 WFG Masters Grand Slam of Curling event. There, the team went 2–2 in pool play, before losing to Team Momoha Tabata in a tiebreaker. Inglis would go on to repeat as Ontario Champions in 2025, returning to the 2025 Scotties Tournament of Hearts. At their second Scotties as a team, the Inglis rink would improve, finishing the round robin with a 6–2 record, qualifying for the Championship round, where they would lose 9–8 to Alberta's Kayla Skrlik.

The team played in the 2025 Canadian Olympic Curling Pre-Trials, where they finished with a 4–3 record, just missing the playoffs.

== Personal life ==
Inglis is employed as the Coordinator, Social Media and Web Content for Curling Canada. She has also sat on the board of the Toronto Curling Association. Her father is Mark Inglis. She is in a relationship with fellow curler Laura Strong.
