= Leslie Wilson-Westcott =

Canadian curler

- Curler
- Born: Leslie Wilson; September 1, 1979 (age 47); Winnipeg, Manitoba

Team
- Curling club: Granite CC, Winnipeg, MB
- Skip: Kristy McDonald
- Third: Lisa Blixhavn
- Second: Leslie Wilson-Westcott
- Lead: Raunora Westcott
- Alternate: Lindsay Warkentin

Curling career
- Member Association: Manitoba
- Hearts: 4 (2010, 2011, 2017, 2018)
- Top CTRS ranking: 6th (2016–17)
Medal record
Women's curling
Scotties Tournament of Hearts
Representing Manitoba
Silver medal – second place	2017 St. Catharines

Leslie Wilson-Westcott, also known as Leslie Wilson (born September 1, 1979 in Winnipeg, Manitoba) is a Canadian curler from Pinawa, Manitoba.

== Career ==
Wilson-Westcott won her first provincial women's championship in 2010 playing second on Team Jill Thurston. The team represented Manitoba at the 2010 Scotties Tournament of Hearts, where they finished the round robin with a 7-4 record, and lost in the tiebreaker match.

Wilson-Westcott joined the Cathy Overton-Clapham rink at second for the next season. With her new team Wilson-Westcott won the 2011 Manitoba Scotties Tournament of Hearts, her second provincial title in a row. At the 2011 Scotties Tournament of Hearts, Overton-Clapham led the team to a 4-7 record. Wilson-Westcott took the next season off, just playing as the team's alternate.

Wilson-Westcott joined the Colleen Kilgallen rink for two seasons, and then moved to the Kristy McDonald team in 2014. The team played in the 2015 Canada Cup of Curling, going 1-5. When McDonald retired from competitive curling in 2015, the team was taken over by Michelle Englot.

In their first season together, the Englot rink won the 2017 Manitoba Scotties Tournament of Hearts, and went all the way to the final of the 2017 Scotties Tournament of Hearts, after finishing the round robin in first place, with a 10-1 record. The team would lose in the final against Team Ontario, skipped by Rachel Homan.

Their successful season qualified the team for the 2017 Canadian Olympic Curling Trials, but they would have less success there, finishing with a 2-6 record. However, as the Rachel Homan team won the event, and would go on to represent Canada at the Olympics, the Englot rink would be invited to play as Team Canada at the 2018 Scotties Tournament of Hearts, a spot normally reserved for the defending champions. There, the team finished with a 6-5 record, in 6th place, missing the playoffs. Also that season, the team would play in the 2018 Continental Cup of Curling.

After the 2017-18 season Wilson-Westcott announced that she would be taking time off to complete her master's degree.

On April 25, 2021, it was announced that Wilson-Westcott would join former teammate Kristy McDonald as she returned to curling competitively with teammates Lisa Blixhavn, Raunora Westcott and Lindsay Warkentin.

== Personal life ==
Wilson-Westcott is married to Brandy Westcott. She is employed as an environmental specialist with Canadian Nuclear Laboratories.
