= Camille Burt =

Canadian curler (born 2000)

- Curler
- Other names: Camille Dunne-Burt
- Born: May 29, 2000 (age 26); St. John's, Newfoundland and Labrador

Team
- Curling club: St. John's CC, St. John's, NL
- Skip: Brooke Godsland
- Third: Erin Porter
- Second: Sarah McNeil-Lamswood
- Lead: Camille Burt
- Alternate: Kate Paterson

Curling career
- Member Association: Newfoundland and Labrador
- Hearts: 3 (2023, 2024, 2025)
- Top CTRS ranking: 52nd (2022–23)

Camille Burt (born May 29, 2000) is a Canadian curler from St. John's, Newfoundland and Labrador. She currently plays lead on Team Brooke Godsland.

== Career ==
Burt made her first appearance at the national level as lead for Mackenzie Glynn. The team, including third Katie Follett and second Sarah Chaytor, represented Newfoundland and Labrador at back-to-back Canadian U18 Curling Championships in 2017 and 2018. In 2017, the team went 1–4 in the round-robin and finished the event tenth place with a 3–5 record. The following year, they finished 2–4 through round-robin play, not advancing to the playoffs.

Team Glynn also found success at the junior level, winning back-to-back titles in 2018 and 2019. At the 2018 Canadian Junior Curling Championships, the team went 5–1 through the round-robin, finishing first in their pool. They then lost all four of their games in the championship pool for a sixth-place finish. They could not replicate their success at the 2019 Canadian Junior Curling Championships, finishing 2–4 through the round-robin. They were, however, able to win all three of their cross-over games to finish top of the seeding pool with a 5–4 record.

While still in juniors, Team Glynn competed in the Newfoundland and Labrador Scotties Tournament of Hearts. In 2018, the team had a strong showing at the provincial championship, qualifying for the playoffs with a 4–2 record. They were then defeated by eventual champion Stacie Curtis 7–0 in the semifinal. In 2019, they finished in last place with a 1–4 record.

Out of juniors, Burt continued to play with Glynn. She moved to third and the team brought on Sarah Cassell and Michelle Taylor as their new second and lead respectively. The team was invited to compete in the 2019 Tour Challenge Tier 2 Grand Slam of Curling event where they finished with a winless 0–4 record. At the 2020 Newfoundland and Labrador Scotties Tournament of Hearts, they missed the playoffs with a 1–4 record.

The new Team Glynn disbanded after just one season, with Burt and Glynn forming a new team with Erica Curtis and Julie Devereaux. Curtis skipped the team, with Glynn playing third, Devereaux at second and Burt at lead. Due to the COVID-19 pandemic, the team only played in one event together, the Bally Haly Cash Spiel, where they finished with a 2–3 record. Team Curtis was unable to compete in the 2021 Newfoundland and Labrador Scotties Tournament of Hearts as they could not commit to the quarantine process in order to compete at the national championship. The following season, they reached the final of both tour events they played in. At the Rick Rowsell Classic, they were defeated by Mackenzie Mitchell in the final and at the Bally Haly Cash Spiel, they lost to Heather Strong. The 2022 provincial championship was cancelled due to the pandemic. As the highest ranked team on the CTRS standings, Team Sarah Hill were appointed to represent Newfoundland and Labrador at the 2022 Scotties Tournament of Hearts in Thunder Bay, Ontario.

Stacie Curtis returned to Newfoundland and took over skipping duties of the team for the 2022–23 season. On tour, the team won the Rick Rowsell Classic and lost in the semifinals of both the Bally Haly Cash Spiel and the Tim Hortons Spitfire Arms Cash Spiel. At the 2023 Newfoundland and Labrador Scotties Tournament of Hearts, Team Curtis finished 3–1 through the round-robin, tied for first place with the Heather Strong rink. They then won 11–8 in the final to win the provincial title. This qualified them to represent Newfoundland and Labrador at the 2023 Scotties Tournament of Hearts in Kamloops, British Columbia. There, they finished with a 2–6 record, earning victories over the Yukon's Hailey Birnie and Wild Card #3's Meghan Walter.

For the 2023–24 season, Team Curtis added Jessica Wiseman to their team and used a five-player rotation throughout the season. On tour, the team only qualified in one of their three events, the Rick Rowsell Classic, where they lost the final to the Brooke Godsland rink. At the 2024 Newfoundland and Labrador Scotties Tournament of Hearts, the team finished 3–3 through the double round-robin. This qualified them for the semifinal, where they won 5–4 over Sarah Boland to advance to the final. There, they defeated Team Godsland 13–5 to secure their second consecutive provincial title. At the 2024 Scotties Tournament of Hearts in Calgary, Alberta, the team finished eighth in Pool A with a 2–6 record. They secured wins over Prince Edward Island's Jane DiCarlo and Alberta's Selena Sturmay, Alberta's only loss in the round-robin.

== Personal life ==
Burt is currently a respiratory therapy student at College of the North Atlantic. She has a daughter.

== Teams ==
Season	Skip	Third	Second	Lead
2016–17	Mackenzie Glynn	Katie Follett	Sarah Chaytor	Camille Burt
2017–18	Mackenzie Glynn	Katie Follett	Sarah Chaytor	Camille Burt
2018–19	Mackenzie Glynn	Katie Follett	Sarah Chaytor	Camille Burt
2019–20	Mackenzie Glynn	Camille Burt	Sarah Cassell	Michelle Taylor
2020–21	Erica Curtis	Mackenzie Glynn	Julie Devereaux	Camille Burt
2021–22	Erica Curtis	Mackenzie Glynn	Julie Hynes	Camille Burt
2022–23	Stacie Curtis	Erica Curtis	Julie Hynes	Camille Burt
2023–24	Stacie Curtis	Erica Curtis	Julie Hynes	Camille Burt
2024–25	Brooke Godsland	Erin Porter	Sarah McNeil Lamswood	Camille Burt
