= Jessica Wiseman =

Canadian curler

- Curler
- Born: Jessica Cunningham; January 10, 1992 (age 34); St. John's, Newfoundland and Labrador

Team
- Curling club: St. John's CC, St. John's, NL
- Skip: Mackenzie Mitchell
- Third: Jessica Wiseman
- Second: Kristina Adams
- Lead: Stacie Curtis
- Mixed doubles partner: Greg Smith

Curling career
- Member Association: Newfoundland and Labrador
- Hearts: 4 (2014, 2015, 2024, 2026)
- Top CTRS ranking: 74th (2023–24)

Jessica Wiseman (born January 10, 1992, in St. John's as Jessica Cunningham) is a Canadian curler from Torbay, Newfoundland and Labrador. She currently plays third on Team Mackenzie Mitchell. She is a four-time Newfoundland and Labrador Scotties Tournament of Hearts champion.

== Career ==
Wiseman competed in three Canadian Junior Curling Championships throughout her junior career from 2010 to 2012. Her best two finishes came in 2010 and 2011 where she finished 5–7 playing second for the Jen Cunningham and Erin Porter rinks respectively. In 2012, she returned as second for Erica Trickett and the team went 3–9.

Out of juniors, Wiseman joined the Heather Strong rink at second. The team also included third Laura Strong and lead Kathryn Cooper. At the 2014 Newfoundland and Labrador Scotties Tournament of Hearts, the team finished first through the round robin with a 3–1 record, advancing directly to the final. There, they downed Shelley Nichols 10–3, securing Wiseman's first provincial title. At the 2014 Scotties Tournament of Hearts in Montreal, Quebec, Team Strong finished seventh through the round robin with a 4–7 record.

The following season, Laura Strong moved to Saskatchewan and Stephanie Korab joined the team as their new third. The new combination worked for Team Strong as they went undefeated to claim the 2015 Newfoundland and Labrador Scotties Tournament of Hearts, defeating Stephanie Guzzwell 8–3 in the final. This earned the team the right to represent Newfoundland and Labrador at the 2015 Scotties Tournament of Hearts, this time in Moose Jaw, Saskatchewan. There, they finished in eighth with an identical 4–7 record from the previous year.

Wiseman left Team Strong following the 2014–15 season and took a year off curling. She returned for the 2016–17 season, playing third for the Cindy Miller rink. After the team failed to qualify at both the 2017 and 2018 provincial championships, the team added Cathlia Ward as their new skip, shifting Miller to second on the team. The team played two tour events during the 2018–19 season, reaching the semifinals of the Steele Cup Cash and the quarterfinals of the Jim Sullivan Curling Classic. At the 2019 Newfoundland and Labrador Scotties Tournament of Hearts, the team finished second through the round robin with a 4–1 record. This qualified them for the final where they lost 5–4 to Kelli Sharpe. The team disbanded following the loss.

The next season, Wiseman and Strong joined forces once again, adding Sarah Day at second and Cindy Miller as lead. At the 2020 Newfoundland and Labrador Scotties Tournament of Hearts, the team finished 3–2 through the round robin before dropping the tiebreaker 7–6 to eventual champion Erica Curtis. After the reduced 2021 and cancelled 2022 provincial championships due to the COVID-19 pandemic, the team competed in the 2023 Newfoundland and Labrador Scotties Tournament of Hearts, this time with second Brooke Godsland and lead Laura Strong. After a 3–1 round robin record, they lost to Stacie Curtis 11–8 in the provincial final.

Following the disbandment of Team Strong, Wiseman joined the Curtis rink of third Erica Curtis, second Julie Hynes and lead Camille Burt as their alternate for the 2023–24 season. On tour, the team only qualified in one of their three events, the Rick Rowsell Classic, where they lost the final to the Brooke Godsland rink. At the 2024 Newfoundland and Labrador Scotties Tournament of Hearts, the team finished 3–3 through the double round robin. This qualified them for the semifinal, where they won 5–4 over Sarah Boland to advance to the final. There, they defeated Team Godsland 13–5 to secure their second consecutive provincial title. At the 2024 Scotties Tournament of Hearts in Calgary, Alberta, the team finished eighth in Pool A with a 2–6 record. They secured wins over Prince Edward Island's Jane DiCarlo and Alberta's Selena Sturmay, Alberta's only loss in the round robin.

Aside from women's curling, Wiseman has competed in two Canadian Mixed Doubles Curling Championships. In 2023, she teamed up with Trent Skanes and the pair finished 1–6 through the round robin, defeating Kim and Wayne Tuck Jr. She won the provincial championship again with Greg Smith in 2024 and the pair will represent Newfoundland and Labrador at the 2024 Canadian Mixed Doubles Curling Championship.

== Personal life ==
Wiseman is employed as an air worthiness manager and aircraft maintenance engineer at PAL Technical Services. She has a son. Her mother Cathy Cunningham is also a curler.

== Teams ==
Season	Skip	Third	Second	Lead	Alternate
2009–10	Jen Cunningham	Tara O'Brien	Jessica Cunningham	Cheryl Norman	
2010–11	Erin Porter	Tara O'Brien	Jessica Cunningham	Erica Trickett	
2011–12	Erica Trickett	Carolyn Suley	Jessica Cunningham	Nicole Noseworthy	
2013–14	Heather Strong	Laura Strong	Jessica Cunningham	Kathryn Cooper	Noelle Thomas-Kennell
2014–15	Heather Strong	Stephanie Korab	Jessica Cunningham	Kathryn Cooper	Noelle Thomas-Kennell
2016–17	Cindy Miller	Jessica Cunningham	Noelle Thomas-Kennell	Courtney Barnhill	
2017–18	Cindy Miller	Jessica Cunningham	Noelle Thomas-Kennell	Sarah Ford	Heather Croke
2018–19	Cathlia Ward	Jessica Cunningham	Cindy Miller	Noelle Thomas-Kennell	
2019–20	Heather Strong	Jessica Wiseman	Sarah Day	Cindy Miller	
2020–21	Heather Strong	Jessica Wiseman	Cindy Miller	Cathy Cunningham	
2022–23	Heather Strong	Jessica Wiseman	Brooke Godsland	Laura Strong	Katie Follett
2023–24	Stacie Curtis	Erica Curtis	Julie Hynes	Camille Burt	Jessica Wiseman
2024–25	Stacie Curtis	Jessica Wiseman	Julie Hynes	Erica Curtis	
2025–26	Mackenzie Mitchell	Jessica Wiseman	Kristina Adams	Stacie Curtis	
