= 2018 Scotties Tournament of Hearts =

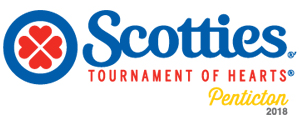
- Host city: Penticton, British Columbia
- Arena: South Okanagan Events Centre
- Dates: January 27 – February 4
- Attendance: 55,138
- Winner: Manitoba
- Curling club: St. Vital Curling Club, Winnipeg
- Skip: Jennifer Jones
- Third: Shannon Birchard
- Second: Jill Officer
- Lead: Dawn McEwen
- Alternate: Kaitlyn Lawes
- Coach: Wendy Morgan
- Finalist: (Manitoba) Wildcard (Kerri Einarson)

The 2018 Scotties Tournament of Hearts, Canada's national women's curling championship, was held from January 27–February 4, 2018 at the South Okanagan Events Centre in Penticton, British Columbia. The winning team represented Canada at the 2018 Ford World Women's Curling Championship held from March 17–25 at the Memorial Gardens in North Bay, Ontario.

The 2018 tournament was the first to use a new 16-team format, featuring representation by all fourteen member associations of Curling Canada, the second-place team from the 2017 tournament (as champion Rachel Homan declined to participate due to her qualification for the 2018 Winter Olympics), and a new wildcard team. As part of this new format, the Bronze medal game was removed from the schedule.

== Teams ==
Curling Canada introduced a new 16-team format for both the Tournament of Hearts and Brier for 2018, under which all 14 member associations of Curling Canada were represented in the main field, rather than being limited by a pre-qualifying tournament. The teams were divided into two pools for round robin play, after which the top four teams from each advanced to the Championship Pool. Defending champion Rachel Homan declined to participate as Team Canada in order to prepare for the 2018 Winter Olympics; Michelle Englot's team, who finished as runner-up in the 2017 tournament, participated in her place. The final spot in the tournament was filled by a wildcard play-in game held on the Friday before the tournament.

The rinks of Hollie Duncan (Ontario), Émilia Gagné (Quebec), and Casey Scheidegger (Alberta) made their Scotties debut; although members of Team Ontario had previous experience at the national women's championship, mostly as alternates. Scotties veteran skip Sherry Anderson (Saskatchewan) led a team of Tournament of Hearts rookies.

The teams are listed as follows:

Canada	Alberta	British Columbia	Manitoba
Granite CC, Winnipeg Skip: Michelle Englot; Third: Kate Cameron; Second: Leslie Wilson-Westcott; Lead: Raunora Westcott (Note: Team Canada alternate Briane Meilleur played lead during Draw 7.); Alternate: Briane Meilleur	Grande Prairie CC, Grande Prairie Skip: Casey Scheidegger; Third: Cary-Anne McTaggart; Second: Jessie Scheidegger; Lead: Kristie Moore; Alternate Susan O'Connor	Nanaimo CC, Nanaimo Skip: Kesa Van Osch; Third: Marika Van Osch; Second: Kalia Van Osch; Lead: Amy Gibson; Alternate: Rachelle Kallechy	St. Vital CC, Winnipeg Skip: Jennifer Jones; Third: Shannon Birchard; Second: Jill Officer; Lead: Dawn McEwen; Alternate Kaitlyn Lawes (Note: Kaitlyn Lawes was officially listed as Team Manitoba's alternate, but did not attend the event.)
New Brunswick	Newfoundland and Labrador	Northern Ontario	Nova Scotia
Curl Moncton, Moncton Skip: Sylvie Robichaud; Third: Melissa Adams; Second: Nicole Arsenault Bishop; Lead: Kendra Lister	St. John's CC, St. John's Skip: Stacie Curtis; Third: Erin Porter; Second: Julie Devereaux; Lead: Erica Trickett	(Note: Team Northern Ontario used a 5-player rotation.)Idylwylde G&CC, Sudbury Skip: Tracy Fleury; Third: Crystal Webster; Second: Jennifer Wylie; Lead: Amanda Gates; Alternate: Jenna Walsh	Dartmouth CC, Dartmouth Skip: Mary-Anne Arsenault; Third: Christina Black; Second: Jenn Baxter; Lead: Jennifer Crouse; Alternate: Carole MacLean
Ontario	Prince Edward Island	Quebec	Saskatchewan
Royal Canadian CC, Toronto Skip: Hollie Duncan; Third: Stephanie LeDrew; Second: Cheryl Kreviazuk; Lead: Karen Sagle; Alternate: Danielle Inglis	Charlottetown CC, Charlottetown Skip: Robyn MacPhee; Third: Sarah Fullerton; Second: Meaghan Hughes; Lead: Michelle McQuaid	CC Riverbend, Alma Skip: Émilia Gagné; Third: Mélina Perron; Second: Marie-Pier Harvey; Lead: Chloé Arnaud; Alternate: Isabelle Thiboutot	Nutana CC, Saskatoon Skip: Sherry Anderson; Third: Kourtney Fesser; Second: Krista Fesser; Lead: Karlee Korchinski; Alternate: Kim Schneider
Northwest Territories	Nunavut	Yukon	(Manitoba) Wildcard
Yellowknife CC, Yellowknife Skip: Kerry Galusha; Third: Sarah Koltun; Second: Megan Koehler; Lead: Shona Barbour	Iqaluit CC, Iqaluit Skip: Amie Shackleton (Note: Geneva Chislett skipped during Nunavut's final game in the placement round.); Third: Geneva Chislett; Second: Christianne West; Lead: Denise Hutchings; Alternate: Robyn Mackey	Whitehorse CC, Whitehorse Skip: Chelsea Duncan; Third: Jenna Duncan; Second: Kara Price; Lead: Jody Smallwood; Alternate: Loralee Johnstone	East St. Paul CC, East St. Paul Skip: Kerri Einarson; Third: Selena Kaatz; Second: Liz Fyfe; Lead: Kristin MacCuish

=== CTRS ranking ===
Member Association (Skip)	Rank	Points
Manitoba (Jones)	1	402.142
(Manitoba) Wildcard (Einarson)	4	250.430
Alberta (Scheidegger)	8	181.937
Canada (Englot)	9	173.365
Northern Ontario (Fleury)	14	113.606
Ontario (H. Duncan)	21	87.562
Nova Scotia (Arsenault)	32	64.152
British Columbia (Van Osch)	34	60.071
Saskatchewan (Anderson)	51	40.800
Newfoundland and Labrador (Curtis)	64	29.389
Prince Edward Island (MacPhee)	67	27.363
New Brunswick (Robichaud)	69	26.336
Northwest Territories (Galusha)	116	3.887
Yukon (C. Duncan)	138	0.000
Quebec (Gagné)	NR	0.000
Nunavut (Shackleton)	NR	0.000

== Wildcard game ==
A wildcard play-in game was played on January 26; it was contested between the top two teams on the CTRS standings who did not win their respective provincial championships, and was played between The Glencoe Club's Chelsea Carey rink from Calgary and the East St. Paul Curling Club's Kerri Einarson rink from the Winnipeg exurb of East St. Paul. With Einarson's victory, Manitoba was represented by three different teams in the tournament.

CTRS standings for wildcard game

Rank	Team	Member Association	Eligibility
1	~~Jennifer Jones~~	Manitoba	Won Manitoba provincials
2	Chelsea Carey	Alberta	Eliminated from provincials
3	~~Rachel Homan~~	Ontario	Playing in Olympics (ineligible)
4	Kerri Einarson	Manitoba	Eliminated from provincials

Wildcard Game

Friday, January 26, 18:30

Sheet C	1	2	3	4	5	6	7	8	9	10	Final
(Alberta) Chelsea Carey 🔨	2	0	0	0	0	0	2	0	0	X	4
(Manitoba) Kerri Einarson	0	2	0	2	1	1	0	0	1	X	7

Player percentages
(Alberta) Team Carey		(Manitoba) Team Einarson	
Laine Peters	91%	Kristin MacCuish	69%
Jocelyn Peterman	86%	Liz Fyfe	89%
Cathy Overton-Clapham	79%	Selena Kaatz	86%
Chelsea Carey	76%	Kerri Einarson	89%
Total	83%	Total	83%

== Map of teams ==
Team Canada Provincial Winners Wild-Card Team

== Round Robin standings ==
Final Round Robin Standings

Key
Teams to Championship Round
Teams to Tiebreakers
Teams to Placement Draw

Pool A	Skip	W	L	PF	PA	EW	EL	BE	SE	S%
(Manitoba) Wildcard	Kerri Einarson	6	1	56	32	31	24	7	11	84%
Manitoba	Jennifer Jones	5	2	65	37	28	22	8	8	87%
Nova Scotia	Mary-Anne Arsenault	5	2	52	41	32	23	11	8	80%
Northern Ontario	Tracy Fleury	5	2	47	43	28	28	10	8	82%
New Brunswick	Sylvie Robichaud	4	3	45	43	32	26	13	9	79%
Saskatchewan	Sherry Anderson	2	5	40	53	27	30	7	5	79%
Northwest Territories	Kerry Galusha	1	6	41	58	22	33	10	7	76%
Yukon	Chelsea Duncan	0	7	27	65	20	34	6	0	69%

Pool B	Skip	W	L	PF	PA	EW	EL	BE	SE	S%
Alberta	Casey Scheidegger	6	1	60	33	32	22	8	9	86%
Canada	Michelle Englot	5	2	51	38	31	24	10	8	85%
British Columbia	Kesa Van Osch	4	3	41	46	24	29	10	4	76%
Newfoundland and Labrador	Stacie Curtis	4	3	57	46	28	30	7	4	81%
Ontario	Hollie Duncan	4	3	49	38	30	26	12	10	83%
Quebec	Émilia Gagné	3	4	42	47	29	28	8	6	73%
Prince Edward Island	Robyn MacPhee	2	5	50	51	28	30	7	4	80%
Nunavut	Amie Shackleton	0	7	23	74	20	33	4	4	62%

== Round Robin results ==
All draw times are listed in Pacific Standard Time (UTC−8:00).

=== Draw 1 ===
Saturday, January 27, 14:00

Sheet A	1	2	3	4	5	6	7	8	9	10	Final
British Columbia (Van Osch)	0	0	1	0	0	1	0	0	0	X	2
Canada (Englot) 🔨	1	0	0	1	0	0	0	2	2	X	6

Sheet B	1	2	3	4	5	6	7	8	9	10	Final
Prince Edward Island (MacPhee)	0	0	4	0	1	0	1	0	0	X	6
Newfoundland and Labrador (Curtis) 🔨	1	0	0	2	0	3	0	3	2	X	11

Sheet C	1	2	3	4	5	6	7	8	9	10	Final
Ontario (H. Duncan)	1	0	0	1	0	0	1	0	2	0	5
Alberta (Scheidegger) 🔨	0	1	1	0	0	1	0	2	0	1	6

Sheet D	1	2	3	4	5	6	7	8	9	10	Final
Quebec (Gagné) 🔨	1	1	3	0	0	2	0	2	X	X	9
Nunavut (Shackleton)	0	0	0	1	0	0	1	0	X	X	2

=== Draw 2 ===
Saturday, January 27, 19:00

Sheet A	1	2	3	4	5	6	7	8	9	10	Final
(Manitoba) Wildcard (Einarson)	3	0	1	0	0	2	1	0	0	1	8
New Brunswick (Robichaud) 🔨	0	1	0	1	1	0	0	2	1	0	6

Sheet B	1	2	3	4	5	6	7	8	9	10	Final
Saskatchewan (Anderson) 🔨	0	0	1	0	0	2	0	2	X	X	5
Manitoba (Jones)	2	3	0	0	5	0	2	0	X	X	12

Sheet C	1	2	3	4	5	6	7	8	9	10	Final
Yukon (C. Duncan) 🔨	0	1	0	0	0	3	0	0	2	X	6
Northwest Territories (Galusha)	0	0	2	1	3	0	2	1	0	X	9

Sheet D	1	2	3	4	5	6	7	8	9	10	Final
Northern Ontario (Fleury) 🔨	1	0	0	0	0	2	0	1	0	X	4
Nova Scotia (Arsenault)	0	0	2	1	2	0	1	0	4	X	10

=== Draw 3 ===
Sunday, January 28, 09:00

Sheet A	1	2	3	4	5	6	7	8	9	10	Final
Prince Edward Island (MacPhee)	0	2	0	1	0	0	1	0	2	X	6
Alberta (Scheidegger) 🔨	2	0	1	0	0	2	0	3	0	X	8

Sheet B	1	2	3	4	5	6	7	8	9	10	Final
British Columbia (Van Osch) 🔨	0	2	0	0	2	1	0	1	1	X	7
Nunavut (Shackleton)	1	0	1	1	0	0	1	0	0	X	4

Sheet C	1	2	3	4	5	6	7	8	9	10	11	Final
Quebec (Gagné)	0	2	0	0	1	0	0	1	0	1	0	5
Canada (Englot) 🔨	2	0	1	1	0	0	0	0	1	0	1	6

Sheet D	1	2	3	4	5	6	7	8	9	10	Final
Ontario (H. Duncan)	0	0	2	0	0	2	0	1	0	X	5
Newfoundland and Labrador (Curtis) 🔨	0	3	0	1	1	0	1	0	2	X	8

=== Draw 4 ===
Sunday, January 28, 14:00

Sheet A	1	2	3	4	5	6	7	8	9	10	Final
Saskatchewan (Anderson) 🔨	0	2	1	0	0	1	0	0	4	X	8
Northwest Territories (Galusha)	0	0	0	0	2	0	0	2	0	X	4

Sheet B	1	2	3	4	5	6	7	8	9	10	Final
(Manitoba) Wildcard (Einarson)	0	2	0	1	0	0	0	3	0	1	7
Nova Scotia (Arsenault) 🔨	1	0	1	0	0	0	1	0	2	0	5

Sheet C	1	2	3	4	5	6	7	8	9	10	Final
Northern Ontario (Fleury)	0	2	0	0	3	0	0	0	0	0	5
New Brunswick (Robichaud) 🔨	1	0	1	0	0	2	2	0	0	2	8

Sheet D	1	2	3	4	5	6	7	8	9	10	Final
Yukon (C. Duncan)	0	0	0	0	1	0	X	X	X	X	1
Manitoba (Jones) 🔨	3	3	1	1	0	6	X	X	X	X	14

=== Draw 5 ===
Sunday, January 28, 19:00

Sheet A	1	2	3	4	5	6	7	8	9	10	Final
Quebec (Gagné) 🔨	0	3	0	1	0	0	0	1	0	0	5
Ontario (H. Duncan)	1	0	2	0	2	0	1	0	0	1	7

Sheet B	1	2	3	4	5	6	7	8	9	10	Final
Canada (Englot)	0	2	0	0	1	0	3	0	0	X	6
Alberta (Scheidegger) 🔨	2	0	0	3	0	2	0	1	2	X	10

Sheet C	1	2	3	4	5	6	7	8	9	10	Final
Nunavut (Shackleton)	0	1	0	0	1	0	1	0	X	X	3
Newfoundland and Labrador (Curtis) 🔨	0	0	3	4	0	3	0	0	X	X	10

Sheet D	1	2	3	4	5	6	7	8	9	10	Final
British Columbia (Van Osch)	0	2	0	2	0	0	0	1	0	X	5
Prince Edward Island (MacPhee) 🔨	2	0	2	0	0	3	1	0	1	X	9

=== Draw 6 ===
Monday, January 29, 09:00

Sheet A	1	2	3	4	5	6	7	8	9	10	Final
Northern Ontario (Fleury)	0	1	1	0	3	0	2	1	0	X	8
Yukon (C. Duncan) 🔨	2	0	0	1	0	1	0	0	1	X	5

Sheet B	1	2	3	4	5	6	7	8	9	10	11	Final
New Brunswick (Robichaud) 🔨	1	0	2	0	1	0	1	1	0	1	1	8
Northwest Territories (Galusha)	0	2	0	2	0	3	0	0	0	0	0	7

Sheet C	1	2	3	4	5	6	7	8	9	10	Final
Nova Scotia (Arsenault)	0	0	1	0	1	0	2	1	0	X	5
Manitoba (Jones) 🔨	2	2	0	2	0	2	0	0	3	X	11

Sheet D	1	2	3	4	5	6	7	8	9	10	Final
(Manitoba) Wildcard (Einarson) 🔨	0	1	0	2	0	1	0	1	3	X	8
Saskatchewan (Anderson)	0	0	1	0	1	0	2	0	0	X	4

=== Draw 7 ===
Monday, January 29, 14:00

Sheet A	1	2	3	4	5	6	7	8	9	10	Final
Alberta (Scheidegger)	0	0	1	0	0	1	0	2	1	0	5
Newfoundland and Labrador (Curtis) 🔨	0	1	0	2	1	0	3	0	0	2	9

Sheet B	1	2	3	4	5	6	7	8	9	10	Final
Quebec (Gagné)	0	1	0	2	0	0	1	0	X	X	4
British Columbia (Van Osch) 🔨	2	0	1	0	3	2	0	2	X	X	10

Sheet C	1	2	3	4	5	6	7	8	9	10	11	Final
Prince Edward Island (MacPhee) 🔨	0	0	1	1	0	0	2	0	2	0	0	6
Ontario (H. Duncan)	0	1	0	0	0	1	0	3	0	1	2	8

Sheet D	1	2	3	4	5	6	7	8	9	10	Final
Nunavut (Shackleton)	0	2	0	1	0	1	0	0	X	X	4
Canada (Englot) 🔨	3	0	3	0	2	0	2	3	X	X	13

=== Draw 8 ===
Monday, January 29, 19:00

Sheet A	1	2	3	4	5	6	7	8	9	10	Final
Northwest Territories (Galusha)	0	0	0	1	0	0	3	0	X	X	4
Manitoba (Jones) 🔨	0	0	2	0	5	3	0	2	X	X	14

Sheet B	1	2	3	4	5	6	7	8	9	10	Final
Northern Ontario (Fleury) 🔨	3	0	0	0	0	2	0	2	0	X	7
(Manitoba) Wildcard (Einarson)	0	2	0	0	1	0	2	0	0	X	5

Sheet C	1	2	3	4	5	6	7	8	9	10	Final
Saskatchewan (Anderson)	3	0	1	0	1	0	1	0	2	2	10
Yukon (C. Duncan) 🔨	0	1	0	1	0	3	0	2	0	0	7

Sheet D	1	2	3	4	5	6	7	8	9	10	11	Final
Nova Scotia (Arsenault) 🔨	1	0	1	0	3	0	0	0	0	1	1	7
New Brunswick (Robichaud)	0	1	0	2	0	3	0	0	0	0	0	6

=== Draw 9 ===
Tuesday, January 30, 09:00

Sheet A	1	2	3	4	5	6	7	8	9	10	Final
Ontario (H. Duncan) 🔨	2	0	0	1	0	1	0	1	0	0	5
British Columbia (Van Osch)	0	1	0	0	0	0	2	0	0	3	6

Sheet B	1	2	3	4	5	6	7	8	9	10	Final
Newfoundland and Labrador (Curtis)	0	0	2	0	0	0	1	0	2	X	5
Canada (Englot) 🔨	2	2	0	1	1	1	0	1	0	X	8

Sheet C	1	2	3	4	5	6	7	8	9	10	Final
Alberta (Scheidegger) 🔨	2	3	0	0	4	0	1	1	X	X	11
Nunavut (Shackleton)	0	0	2	1	0	1	0	0	X	X	4

Sheet D	1	2	3	4	5	6	7	8	9	10	Final
Prince Edward Island (MacPhee)	0	2	0	1	0	0	2	0	1	0	6
Quebec (Gagné) 🔨	1	0	1	0	2	1	0	1	0	2	8

=== Draw 10 ===
Tuesday, January 30, 14:00

Sheet A	1	2	3	4	5	6	7	8	9	10	Final
Yukon (C. Duncan)	0	0	1	0	0	1	0	1	X	X	3
(Manitoba) Wildcard (Einarson) 🔨	3	2	0	2	1	0	2	0	X	X	10

Sheet B	1	2	3	4	5	6	7	8	9	10	Final
Manitoba (Jones) 🔨	0	2	0	2	0	2	0	1	0	X	7
New Brunswick (Robichaud)	0	0	0	0	2	0	1	0	1	X	4

Sheet C	1	2	3	4	5	6	7	8	9	10	Final
Northwest Territories (Galusha)	0	4	0	0	2	0	0	2	0	0	8
Nova Scotia (Arsenault) 🔨	1	0	2	0	0	3	1	0	0	2	9

Sheet D	1	2	3	4	5	6	7	8	9	10	Final
Saskatchewan (Anderson) 🔨	0	1	0	1	0	0	1	1	0	X	4
Northern Ontario (Fleury)	1	0	2	0	2	1	0	0	1	X	7

=== Draw 11 ===
Tuesday, January 30, 19:00

Sheet A	1	2	3	4	5	6	7	8	9	10	Final
Newfoundland and Labrador (Curtis)	0	0	0	3	0	2	0	0	2	0	7
Quebec (Gagné) 🔨	0	2	1	0	1	0	1	2	0	2	9

Sheet B	1	2	3	4	5	6	7	8	9	10	Final
Nunavut (Shackleton) 🔨	0	1	0	1	0	0	0	0	X	X	2
Ontario (H. Duncan)	0	0	1	0	4	4	2	1	X	X	12

Sheet C	1	2	3	4	5	6	7	8	9	10	Final
Canada (Englot) 🔨	2	0	0	0	2	2	0	1	0	X	7
Prince Edward Island (MacPhee)	0	0	0	2	0	0	1	0	2	X	5

Sheet D	1	2	3	4	5	6	7	8	9	10	Final
Alberta (Scheidegger) 🔨	0	2	3	0	1	3	0	2	X	X	11
British Columbia (Van Osch)	0	0	0	1	0	0	0	0	X	X	1

=== Draw 12 ===
Wednesday, January 31, 09:00

Sheet A	1	2	3	4	5	6	7	8	9	10	Final
Manitoba (Jones) 🔨	2	0	2	0	0	1	0	0	0	0	5
Northern Ontario (Fleury)	0	1	0	2	1	0	0	2	0	3	9

Sheet B	1	2	3	4	5	6	7	8	9	10	Final
Nova Scotia (Arsenault)	0	0	0	1	0	0	2	2	3	X	8
Yukon (C. Duncan) 🔨	0	0	1	0	0	1	0	0	0	X	2

Sheet C	1	2	3	4	5	6	7	8	9	10	11	Final
New Brunswick (Robichaud) 🔨	2	0	0	1	0	0	2	1	0	0	1	7
Saskatchewan (Anderson)	0	2	0	0	1	0	0	0	2	1	0	6

Sheet D	1	2	3	4	5	6	7	8	9	10	Final
Northwest Territories (Galusha)	1	0	0	0	0	1	1	0	X	X	3
(Manitoba) Wildcard (Einarson) 🔨	0	2	1	2	2	0	0	2	X	X	9

=== Draw 13 ===
Wednesday, January 31, 14:00

Sheet A	1	2	3	4	5	6	7	8	9	10	Final
Nunavut (Shackleton)	0	0	0	1	0	1	0	2	X	X	4
Prince Edward Island (MacPhee) 🔨	3	2	1	0	2	0	4	0	X	X	12

Sheet B	1	2	3	4	5	6	7	8	9	10	Final
Alberta (Scheidegger) 🔨	0	2	3	0	0	2	0	2	X	X	9
Quebec (Gagné)	0	0	0	0	1	0	1	0	X	X	2

Sheet C	1	2	3	4	5	6	7	8	9	10	Final
Newfoundland and Labrador (Curtis) 🔨	0	0	1	0	1	0	2	0	3	0	7
British Columbia (Van Osch)	0	2	0	2	0	2	0	3	0	1	10

Sheet D	1	2	3	4	5	6	7	8	9	10	Final
Canada (Englot) 🔨	1	0	0	0	1	1	0	2	0	0	5
Ontario (H. Duncan)	0	2	0	1	0	0	3	0	0	1	7

=== Draw 14 ===
Wednesday, January 31, 19:00

Sheet A	1	2	3	4	5	6	7	8	9	10	Final
Nova Scotia (Arsenault) 🔨	2	1	0	1	0	1	0	3	X	X	8
Saskatchewan (Anderson)	0	0	1	0	1	0	1	0	X	X	3

Sheet B	1	2	3	4	5	6	7	8	9	10	Final
Northwest Territories (Galusha)	0	1	1	0	0	3	0	0	1	0	6
Northern Ontario (Fleury) 🔨	0	0	0	2	1	0	2	1	0	1	7

Sheet C	1	2	3	4	5	6	7	8	9	10	Final
Manitoba (Jones)	0	1	0	0	0	1	0	2	X	X	4
(Manitoba) Wildcard (Einarson) 🔨	1	0	0	4	2	0	2	0	X	X	9

Sheet D	1	2	3	4	5	6	7	8	9	10	Final
New Brunswick (Robichaud) 🔨	1	0	0	1	0	2	0	2	0	X	6
Yukon (C. Duncan)	0	1	0	0	0	0	1	0	1	X	3

=== Tiebreakers ===
Thursday, February 1, 09:00

Sheet A	1	2	3	4	5	6	7	8	9	10	Final
Newfoundland and Labrador (Curtis) 🔨	1	0	3	0	1	0	1	2	0	0	8
Ontario (H. Duncan)	0	2	0	3	0	1	0	0	3	2	11

== Placement Round ==
Each team that finished fifth through eight in their pool played the team that finished in the same position in the opposite pool for the purpose of determining final tournament ranking. For example, the winner of the game between fifth place teams was ranked ninth place overall, the loser of that game was ranked tenth place, and so on.

=== Seeding Games ===
All game times are listed in Pacific Standard Time (UTC−8:00).

==== A5 vs. B5 ====
Friday, February 02, 09:00

Sheet B	1	2	3	4	5	6	7	8	9	10	Final
New Brunswick (Robichaud) 🔨	0	1	2	2	0	1	0	1	0	1	8
Newfoundland and Labrador (Curtis)	1	0	0	0	1	0	1	0	1	0	4

==== A6 vs. B6 ====
Friday, February 02, 09:00

Sheet C	1	2	3	4	5	6	7	8	9	10	Final
Saskatchewan (Anderson) 🔨	2	0	2	3	0	0	1	0	1	X	9
Quebec (Gagné)	0	5	0	0	0	1	0	1	0	X	7

==== A7 vs. B7 ====
Friday, February 02, 09:00

Sheet D	1	2	3	4	5	6	7	8	9	10	11	Final
Northwest Territories (Galusha)	0	2	0	1	0	2	0	0	2	0	2	9
Prince Edward Island (MacPhee) 🔨	1	0	1	0	2	0	0	1	0	2	0	7

==== A8 vs. B8 ====
Friday, February 02, 09:00

Sheet A	1	2	3	4	5	6	7	8	9	10	Final
Yukon (C. Duncan) 🔨	3	0	1	1	0	1	1	0	2	X	9
Nunavut (Chislett)	0	1	0	0	2	0	0	1	0	X	4

== Championship Pool Standings ==
All wins and losses earned in the round robin (including results against teams that failed to advance) were carried forward into the Championship Pool. Wins in tiebreaker games were not carried forward.

Final Championship Pool Standings

Key
Teams to Playoffs
Teams to Tiebreakers

Team	Skip	W	L	PF	PA	EW	EL	BE	SE	S%
(Manitoba) Wildcard	Kerri Einarson	9	2	80	54	49	40	13	17	83%
Manitoba	Jennifer Jones	9	2	102	49	47	33	10	14	89%
Nova Scotia	Mary-Anne Arsenault	9	2	88	60	52	38	14	13	81%
Northern Ontario	Tracy Fleury	8	3	74	65	44	43	16	8	84%
Alberta	Casey Scheidegger	7	4	77	57	44	40	13	10	86%
Canada	Michelle Englot	6	5	67	68	44	42	13	10	83%
British Columbia	Kesa Van Osch	4	7	58	79	36	46	17	4	78%
Ontario	Hollie Duncan	4	7	74	75	50	46	14	14	82%

== Championship Pool Results ==
All draw times are listed in Pacific Standard Time (UTC−8:00).

=== Draw 15 ===
Thursday, February 01, 14:00

Sheet A	1	2	3	4	5	6	7	8	9	10	Final
Ontario (H. Duncan)	1	1	0	1	0	1	0	0	1	0	5
(Manitoba) Wildcard (Einarson) 🔨	0	0	1	0	2	0	0	3	0	1	7

Sheet B	1	2	3	4	5	6	7	8	9	10	Final
British Columbia (Van Osch)	0	1	0	1	0	0	1	0	X	X	3
Manitoba (Jones) 🔨	2	0	3	0	0	3	0	2	X	X	10

Sheet C	1	2	3	4	5	6	7	8	9	10	Final
Canada (Englot)	0	0	0	0	0	1	0	0	X	X	1
Nova Scotia (Arsenault) 🔨	0	1	1	1	0	0	2	2	X	X	7

Sheet D	1	2	3	4	5	6	7	8	9	10	Final
Alberta (Scheidegger) 🔨	1	0	1	0	3	0	2	0	1	X	7
Northern Ontario (Fleury)	0	0	0	1	0	2	0	1	0	X	4

=== Draw 16 ===
Thursday, February 01, 19:00

Sheet A	1	2	3	4	5	6	7	8	9	10	Final
Canada (Englot)	0	0	1	0	1	0	1	0	X	X	3
Northern Ontario (Fleury) 🔨	0	2	0	2	0	2	0	2	X	X	8

Sheet B	1	2	3	4	5	6	7	8	9	10	Final
Alberta (Scheidegger)	0	1	0	1	0	0	1	0	X	X	3
Nova Scotia (Arsenault) 🔨	3	0	1	0	0	1	0	3	X	X	8

Sheet C	1	2	3	4	5	6	7	8	9	10	Final
British Columbia (Van Osch)	0	0	2	0	1	0	0	0	2	0	5
(Manitoba) Wildcard (Einarson) 🔨	2	1	0	1	0	0	0	2	0	0	6

Sheet D	1	2	3	4	5	6	7	8	9	10	Final
Ontario (H. Duncan)	0	0	1	0	1	0	1	0	X	X	3
Manitoba (Jones) 🔨	4	1	0	1	0	3	0	2	X	X	11

=== Draw 17 ===
Friday, February 02, 14:00

Sheet A	1	2	3	4	5	6	7	8	9	10	Final
Manitoba (Jones) 🔨	1	0	0	2	0	1	1	1	X	X	6
Alberta (Scheidegger)	0	1	0	0	1	0	0	0	X	X	2

Sheet B	1	2	3	4	5	6	7	8	9	10	Final
(Manitoba) Wildcard (Einarson)	0	1	0	0	2	0	1	1	0	0	5
Canada (Englot) 🔨	1	0	1	2	0	1	0	0	1	2	8

Sheet C	1	2	3	4	5	6	7	8	9	10	Final
Northern Ontario (Fleury) 🔨	2	0	2	0	2	0	1	0	0	1	8
Ontario (H. Duncan)	0	1	0	2	0	1	0	2	0	0	6

Sheet D	1	2	3	4	5	6	7	8	9	10	Final
Nova Scotia (Arsenault) 🔨	2	0	3	0	1	0	1	3	X	X	10
British Columbia (Van Osch)	0	1	0	2	0	1	0	0	X	X	4

=== Draw 18 ===
Friday, February 02, 19:00

Sheet A	1	2	3	4	5	6	7	8	9	10	Final
Northern Ontario (Fleury) 🔨	0	2	0	0	2	0	2	0	0	1	7
British Columbia (Van Osch)	0	0	2	0	0	1	0	0	2	0	5

Sheet B	1	2	3	4	5	6	7	8	9	10	11	Final
Nova Scotia (Arsenault)	0	0	1	3	0	2	0	0	2	0	2	10
Ontario (H. Duncan) 🔨	1	2	0	0	1	0	1	2	0	1	0	8

Sheet C	1	2	3	4	5	6	7	8	9	10	Final
Manitoba (Jones)	1	3	0	2	1	0	3	0	X	X	10
Canada (Englot) 🔨	0	0	1	0	0	2	0	1	X	X	4

Sheet D	1	2	3	4	5	6	7	8	9	10	Final
(Manitoba) Wildcard (Einarson)	1	1	0	1	1	0	0	1	0	1	6
Alberta (Scheidegger) 🔨	0	0	2	0	0	0	2	0	0	0	4

== Playoffs ==
Page playoff system
1	(Manitoba) Wildcard	7
2	Manitoba	9
3	Nova Scotia	6
4	Northern Ontario	2

Semifinal
1	(Manitoba) Wildcard	12
3	Nova Scotia	9

Final
2	Manitoba	8
1	(Manitoba) Wildcard	6

=== 1 vs. 2 ===
Saturday, February 03, 19:00

Sheet C	1	2	3	4	5	6	7	8	9	10	Final
(Manitoba) Wildcard (Einarson) 🔨	0	2	0	1	0	2	1	0	1	0	7
Manitoba (Jones)	0	0	2	0	3	0	0	2	0	2	9

Player percentages
(Manitoba) Wildcard		Manitoba	
Kristin MacCuish	79%	Dawn McEwen	86%
Liz Fyfe	73%	Jill Officer	88%
Selena Kaatz	89%	Shannon Birchard	81%
Kerri Einarson	78%	Jennifer Jones	83%
Total	79%	Total	84%

=== 3 vs. 4 ===
Saturday, February 03, 14:00

Sheet C	1	2	3	4	5	6	7	8	9	10	Final
Nova Scotia (Arsenault) 🔨	0	0	0	2	0	3	0	0	1	X	6
Northern Ontario (Fleury)	0	0	0	0	1	0	0	1	0	X	2

Player percentages
Nova Scotia		Northern Ontario	
Jennifer Crouse	72%	Amanda Gates	94%
Jenn Baxter	86%	Jennifer Wylie	84%
Christina Black	88%	Crystal Webster	74%
Mary-Anne Arsenault	97%	Tracy Fleury	74%
Total	86%	Total	81%

=== Semifinal ===
Sunday, February 04, 09:00

Sheet C	1	2	3	4	5	6	7	8	9	10	Final
(Manitoba) Wildcard (Einarson) 🔨	2	0	3	0	4	1	0	1	0	1	12
Nova Scotia (Arsenault)	0	3	0	3	0	0	2	0	1	0	9

Player percentages
(Manitoba) Wildcard		Nova Scotia	
Kristin MacCuish	93%	Jennifer Crouse	91%
Liz Fyfe	88%	Jenn Baxter	81%
Selena Kaatz	85%	Christina Black	68%
Kerri Einarson	78%	Mary-Anne Arsenault	74%
Total	85%	Total	78%

=== Final ===
Sunday, February 04, 16:00

Sheet C	1	2	3	4	5	6	7	8	9	10	Final
Manitoba (Jones) 🔨	1	0	1	0	0	2	0	2	0	2	8
(Manitoba) Wildcard (Einarson)	0	2	0	1	1	0	1	0	1	0	6

Player percentages
Manitoba		(Manitoba) Wildcard	
Dawn McEwen	88%	Kristin MacCuish	89%
Jill Officer	85%	Liz Fyfe	85%
Shannon Birchard	81%	Selena Kaatz	81%
Jennifer Jones	84%	Kerri Einarson	66%
Total	84%	Total	80%

== Statistics ==
=== Top 5 player percentages ===
Final Round Robin Percentages; minimum 6 games

Key
First All-Star Team
Second All-Star Team

Leads	%
(Manitoba) Dawn McEwen	94
(Canada) Raunora Westcott	89
WC Kristin MacCuish	89
(Ontario) Karen Sagle	89
(Alberta) Kristie Moore	88

Seconds	%
(Manitoba) Jill Officer	90
(Alberta) Jessie Scheidegger	88
(Ontario) Cheryl Kreviazuk	85
(Northern Ontario) Jennifer Wylie	84
(Canada) Leslie Wilson-Westcott	83
(Nova Scotia) Jenn Baxter	83

Thirds	%
(Alberta) Cary-Anne McTaggart	87
(Manitoba) Shannon Birchard	87
(Newfoundland and Labrador) Erin Porter	84
WC Selena Kaatz	82
(Canada) Kate Cameron	81
(Northern Ontario) Crystal Webster	81

Skips	%
(Manitoba) Jennifer Jones	84
(Northern Ontario) Tracy Fleury	83
(Alberta) Casey Scheidegger	81
(Nova Scotia) Mary-Anne Arsenault	81
(Canada) Michelle Englot	80
WC Kerri Einarson	80
(Ontario) Hollie Duncan	80

=== Perfect games ===
Player	Team	Position	Shots	Opponent
Kate Cameron	Canada	Third	20	Prince Edward Island
Jessie Scheidegger	Alberta	Second	16	British Columbia

== Awards ==
The awards and all-star teams were as follows:

All-Star Teams

First Team

- Skip: Jennifer Jones, Manitoba
- Third: Cary-Anne McTaggart, Alberta
- Second: Jill Officer, Manitoba
- Lead: Dawn McEwen, Manitoba

Second Team

- Skip: Tracy Fleury, Northern Ontario
- Third: Shannon Birchard, Manitoba
- Second: Jessie Scheidegger, Alberta
- Lead: Raunora Westcott, Team Canada

Marj Mitchell Sportsmanship Award

- Sherry Anderson, Saskatchewan

Joan Mead Builder Award

- Melissa Soligo, Director of the High-Performance Program at Curl BC, national and international coach. Played second on the 1991 Scott champion Team British Columbia, earned a silver medal at the 1991 Worlds, and was a demonstration sport bronze medalist with Team Canada at the 1992 Winter Olympics in Albertville, France.

== Provincial and territorial playdowns ==
- 2018 Alberta Scotties Tournament of Hearts
- 2018 British Columbia Scotties Tournament of Hearts
- 2018 Manitoba Scotties Tournament of Hearts
- 2018 New Brunswick Scotties Tournament of Hearts
- 2018 Newfoundland and Labrador Scotties Tournament of Hearts
- 2018 Northern Ontario Scotties Tournament of Hearts
- 2018 Nova Scotia Scotties Tournament of Hearts
- 2018 Ontario Scotties Tournament of Hearts
- 2018 Prince Edward Island Scotties Tournament of Hearts
- 2018 Quebec Scotties Tournament of Hearts
- 2018 Saskatchewan Scotties Tournament of Hearts
- 2018 Northwest Territories Scotties Tournament of Hearts
- 2018 Yukon Scotties Tournament of Hearts
- 2018 Nunavut Scotties Tournament of Hearts
