= Stacie Curtis =

Canadian curler (born 1986)

- Curler
- Born: Stacie Devereaux; May 27, 1986 (age 40); St. John's, Newfoundland

Team
- Curling club: St. John's CC, St. John's, NL
- Skip: Mackenzie Mitchell
- Third: Jessica Wiseman
- Second: Kristina Adams
- Lead: Stacie Curtis

Curling career
- Member Association: Newfoundland and Labrador
- Hearts: 8 (2011, 2013, 2016, 2017, 2018, 2023, 2024, 2026)
- Top CTRS ranking: 52nd (2022–23)
Medal record
Women's curling
Representing Canada
World Junior Championships
Silver medal – second place	2007 Eveleth

Stacie Curtis (born Devereaux; May 27, 1986) is a Canadian curler originally from St. John's, Newfoundland and Labrador. She is a four-time provincial junior champion, eight-time provincial women's champion and 2007 Canadian Junior champion and World Junior silver medalist.

== Career ==
Curtis represented Newfoundland and Labrador at the 2003 Canada Games, placing 7th.

Curtis won her first provincial junior championship in 2004. Her debut performance as skip of team Newfoundland and Labrador at the 2004 Canadian Junior Curling Championships was somewhat successful, the rink finished with an 8–4 record, just missing the playoffs. Devereaux would win her second straight provincial junior crown the following year. Her record at the 2005 Canadian Junior Curling Championships was not as great, having finished with a 5–7 record. Curtis won a third straight provincial title in 2006. Once again she missed the playoffs at the Canadian Juniors, finishing with a 5–6 record. Devereaux won her fourth and final provincial junior championship in 2007. Her performance at the Canadian Juniors was much better. Her team of Steph Guzzwell, Sarah Paul and Julie Devereaux finished the round robin in first place with an 11–1 record. Curtis defeated Manitoba's Calleen Neufeld 7–6 in the final to win the Canadian Junior championship. This marked the first time a team from Newfoundland and Labrador won a women's Canadian Junior championship. This qualified her to represent Canada at the 2007 World Junior Curling Championships. Curtis finished the round robin with a 6–3 record, in 2nd place behind the United States. She beat Denmark 10–6 in the semi-final only to lose to Scotland's Sarah Reid 7–6 in the final.

In 2009, she played in her first provincial championship. She finished with a 2–4 record. The following year, she improved to a 4–2 record, losing to Heather Strong in the semi-finals. Finally, at the 2011 provincial championship, Curtis won the title, going undefeated and beating Shelley Nichols in the provincial final. This qualified Curtis for the 2011 Scotties Tournament of Hearts, where she finished in last place with a 1–10 record. Curtis would not return to the Hearts in 2012, as her team lost in the provincial semi-final. However, the following year, she went on to win her second provincial title, and once again represent Newfoundland and Labrador at the Hearts. At the 2013 Scotties Tournament of Hearts she once again struggled, finishing with a 2–9 record.

The next two seasons, Curtis struggled at the provincial championships going 1–3 at the 2014 Newfoundland and Labrador Scotties Tournament of Hearts and 0-4 in 2015. Finally, she won another provincial title in 2016, winning all four of her matches. Representing her province at the 2016 Scotties Tournament of Hearts, she finished with a 3–8 record. Curtis would go on to win the 2017 Newfoundland and Labrador Scotties Tournament of Hearts, defeating Shelley Hardy in a playoff after a 3-1 round robin record. At the 2017 Scotties Tournament of Hearts, Curtis improved on her previous record, finishing 5–6. At the 2018 Newfoundland and Labrador Scotties Tournament of Hearts, Curtis finished the round robin with a 5–1 record, but won all of her playoff games, including beating the previously undefeated Heather Strong team twice. At the 2018 Scotties Tournament of Hearts, Curtis led her province to a 4–3 record in group play, but lost to Ontario in a tiebreaker to move on to the championship pool. She then lost to New Brunswick's Sylvie Robichaud in the ninth place game.

Following the 2017–18 season, Curtis and her family moved to Miami, Florida. They would stay there for four years until 2022 when they moved back to Newfoundland and Labrador. For the 2022–23 season, Curtis took over skipping duties for the Erica Curtis rink which also included second Julie Hynes and lead Camille Burt. On tour, the team won the Rick Rowsell Classic and lost in the semifinals of both the Bally Haly Cash Spiel and the Tim Hortons Spitfire Arms Cash Spiel. At the 2023 Newfoundland and Labrador Scotties Tournament of Hearts, Team Curtis finished 3–1 through the round robin, tied for first place with the Heather Strong rink. They then won 11–8 in the final to win the provincial title. This qualified them to represent Newfoundland and Labrador at the 2023 Scotties Tournament of Hearts in Kamloops, British Columbia. There, they finished with a 2–6 record, earning victories over the Yukon's Hailey Birnie and Wild Card #3's Meghan Walter.

For the 2023–24 season, Team Curtis added Jessica Wiseman to their team and used a five-player rotation throughout the season. On tour, the team only qualified in one of their three events, the Rick Rowsell Classic, where they lost the final to the Brooke Godsland rink. At the 2024 Newfoundland and Labrador Scotties Tournament of Hearts, the team finished 3–3 through the double round robin. This qualified them for the semifinal, where they won 5–4 over Sarah Boland to advance to the final. There, they defeated Team Godsland 13–5 to secure their second consecutive provincial title. At the 2024 Scotties Tournament of Hearts in Calgary, Alberta, the team finished eighth in Pool A with a 2–6 record. They secured wins over Prince Edward Island's Jane DiCarlo and Alberta's Selena Sturmay, Alberta's only loss in the round robin.

== Personal life ==
Curtis was employed as a border services officer for the Canada Border Services Agency. She is married to Justin Curtis, and have two children. They moved to Miami in 2018, and then returned to St. John's in 2022. Her sister Julie Hynes plays second on her team.
