= Julie Hynes =

Canadian curler

- Curler
- Born: January 15, 1989 (age 37); St. John's, Newfoundland

Team
- Curling club: St. John's CC, St. John's, NL

Curling career
- Member Association: Newfoundland and Labrador
- Hearts: 8 (2011, 2013, 2016, 2017, 2018, 2020, 2023, 2024)
- Top CTRS ranking: 52nd (2022–23)
Medal record
Women's curling
Representing Canada
World Junior Championships
Silver medal – second place	2007 Eveleth

Julie Hynes (born January 15, 1989, in St. John's, Newfoundland as Julie Devereaux) is a Canadian curler from Newfoundland and Labrador.

== Career ==
=== Junior career ===
Hynes joined her sister Stacie Curtis' junior team in 2004 as her second. They would represent Newfoundland and Labrador at the 2005 Canadian Junior Curling Championships, finishing with a 5–7 record. The sisters returned to the Juniors in 2006, this time with Hynes throwing lead rocks. There they finished with a 5–6 record. 2007 would be their breakthrough year, when they represented their province for a third time. Team win finished in first place after the round robin at the 2007 Canadian Junior Curling Championships. The team then dispelled Manitoba in the final to claim the Canadian Junior championship crown. The rink represented Canada at the 2007 World Junior Curling Championships, where they would win a silver medal, after losing to Scotland's Sarah Reid in the final.

With Curtis graduating from the junior ranks, Hynes would form her own junior team with Stephanie Davis, Jessica Mouland and Erica Trickett. The team would represent Newfoundland and Labrador at the 2008 Canadian Junior Curling Championships. Hynes led her rink to a 5–7 record.

=== Women's career ===
After juniors, Hynes joined back with her sister's rink. The team played in the 2009 Newfoundland and Labrador Scotties Tournament of Hearts, finishing with a 2–4 record. After the season, Hynes left competitive curling, only playing for the team as their alternate. Hynes was the team's alternate at the 2011 Scotties Tournament of Hearts (1–10 record) and the 2013 Scotties Tournament of Hearts (2–9 record), playing in just one game each. Hynes would return to the team as a full member in 2014 at the second position. The team would play at the 2015 Newfoundland and Labrador Scotties Tournament of Hearts, but did not win any games. However, they found more success the next season, running the table at the 2016 Newfoundland and Labrador Scotties Tournament of Hearts, qualifying for the 2016 Scotties Tournament of Hearts. At the Hearts, the team finished a 3–8 record. The team also won the 2017 Newfoundland and Labrador Scotties Tournament of Hearts and represented the province at the 2017 Scotties Tournament of Hearts, where they finished with an improved 5–6 record. The team won a third straight provincial title at the 2018 Newfoundland and Labrador Scotties Tournament of Hearts. At the 2018 Scotties Tournament of Hearts, they finished pool play with a 4–3 record, but lost to Ontario in a tiebreaker, missing a chance to go to the championship round.

Stacie Curtis would move to Miami, forcing Hynes to find a new team. Hynes played lead the Erica Curtis (Trickett) rink at the 2019 Newfoundland and Labrador Scotties Tournament of Hearts, but missed the playoffs. The next year, she moved to the second position on the team, and won the 2020 Newfoundland and Labrador Scotties Tournament of Hearts. At the 2020 Scotties Tournament of Hearts, the team went 1–6 in group play. Also that season, Hynes played lead for Team Scheidegger at the 2019 National Grand Slam event, filling in for Kristie Moore who skipped in lieu of Casey Scheidegger who was on maternity leave. The team finished 1-3 in pool play.

Team Curtis disbanded following the season, with Hynes and teammate Erica Curtis joining forces with Mackenzie Glynn and Camille Burt for the 2020–21 season. Due to the COVID-19 pandemic, the team only played in one event together, the Bally Haly Cash Spiel, where they finished with a 2–3 record. Team Curtis was unable to compete in the 2021 Newfoundland and Labrador Scotties Tournament of Hearts as they could not commit to the quarantine process in order to compete at the national championship. The following season, they reached the final of both tour events they played in. At the Rick Rowsell Classic, they were defeated by Mackenzie Mitchell in the final and at the Bally Haly Cash Spiel, they lost to Heather Strong. The 2022 provincial championship was cancelled due to the pandemic. As the highest ranked team on the CTRS standings, Team Sarah Hill were appointed to represent Newfoundland and Labrador at the 2022 Scotties Tournament of Hearts in Thunder Bay, Ontario.

Stacie Curtis returned to Newfoundland for the 2022–23 season and took over skipping duties of the team. On tour, the team won the Rick Rowsell Classic and lost in the semifinals of both the Bally Haly Cash Spiel and the Tim Hortons Spitfire Arms Cash Spiel. At the 2023 Newfoundland and Labrador Scotties Tournament of Hearts, Team Curtis finished 3–1 through the round robin, tied for first place with the Heather Strong rink. They then won 11–8 in the final to win the provincial title. This qualified them to represent Newfoundland and Labrador at the 2023 Scotties Tournament of Hearts in Kamloops, British Columbia. There, they finished with a 2–6 record, earning victories over the Yukon's Hailey Birnie and Wild Card #3's Meghan Walter.

For the 2023–24 season, Team Curtis added Jessica Wiseman to their team and used a five-player rotation throughout the season. On tour, the team only qualified in one of their three events, the Rick Rowsell Classic, where they lost the final to the Brooke Godsland rink. At the 2024 Newfoundland and Labrador Scotties Tournament of Hearts, the team finished 3–3 through the double round robin. This qualified them for the semifinal, where they won 5–4 over Sarah Boland to advance to the final. There, they defeated Team Godsland 13–5 to secure their second consecutive provincial title. At the 2024 Scotties Tournament of Hearts in Calgary, Alberta, the team finished eighth in Pool A with a 2–6 record. They secured wins over Prince Edward Island's Jane DiCarlo and Alberta's Selena Sturmay, Alberta's only loss in the round robin.

== Personal life ==
Hynes is employed as a registered nurse with Eastern Health. She is married to Justin Hynes.
