= Erica Curtis =

Canadian curler (born 1991)

- Curler
- Born: Erica Trickett; June 12, 1991 (age 35); St. John's, Newfoundland and Labrador

Team
- Curling club: St. John's CC, St. John's, NL

Curling career
- Member Association: Newfoundland and Labrador
- Hearts: 5 (2017, 2018, 2020, 2023, 2024)
- Top CTRS ranking: 32nd (2012–13)

Erica Curtis (born June 12, 1991 as Erica Trickett) is a Canadian curler from Paradise, Newfoundland and Labrador.

== Career ==
Curtis made three appearances at the Canadian Junior Curling Championships in 2008, 2011, and 2012. In 2008, she finished 5–7 as lead for Julie Devereaux. In 2011, she again finished 5–7 this time as lead for Erin Porter. On her final trip in 2012, she skipped the Newfoundland and Labrador team to a 3–9 record. She also competed in two U Sports/Curling Canada University Curling Championships, finishing 4–3 in 2011 and 2–5 in 2012.

Out of juniors, she joined the Heather Strong rink in second. They played in the 2012 Masters Tier 2 Grand Slam of Curling event where they qualified for the playoffs before losing to Chelsea Carey in the quarterfinals. They finished second in the 2013 Newfoundland and Labrador Scotties Tournament of Hearts, only losing by one point in the final to Stacie Curtis. She later joined Marie Christianson's rink for the 2014–15 season however they had limited success on tour and failed to qualify for the playoffs at provincials.

Curtis won her first Newfoundland and Labrador Scotties Tournament of Hearts in 2017 as lead for Stacie Curtis. They had a good showing at the 2017 Scotties Tournament of Hearts, finishing in eighth with a 5–6 record. They defended their title the following season at the 2018 Newfoundland and Labrador Scotties Tournament of Hearts, going 8–1 through the tournament. They had a great start at the 2018 Scotties Tournament of Hearts, winning their first four games before losing three straight. They then lost the tiebreaker to Ontario's Hollie Duncan and were eliminated. They officially finished tenth in the tournament, losing the ninth place seeding game to New Brunswick's Sylvie Robichaud.

Curtis began skipping her own team the following season. They didn't play in any tour events and failed to qualify at the 2019 Newfoundland and Labrador Scotties Tournament of Hearts. The following year however, they won three straight sudden death games to win the 2020 Newfoundland and Labrador Scotties Tournament of Hearts. At the 2020 Scotties Tournament of Hearts, they finished in fourteenth place with a 1–6 record.

Team Curtis disbanded following the season, with Curtis and teammate Julie Devereaux joining forces with Mackenzie Glynn and Camille Burt for the 2020–21 season. Due to the COVID-19 pandemic, the team only played in one event together, the Bally Haly Cash Spiel, where they finished with a 2–3 record. Team Curtis was unable to compete in the 2021 Newfoundland and Labrador Scotties Tournament of Hearts as they could not commit to the quarantine process in order to compete at the national championship. The following season, they reached the final of both tour events they played in. At the Rick Rowsell Classic, they were defeated by Mackenzie Mitchell in the final and at the Bally Haly Cash Spiel, they lost to Heather Strong. The 2022 provincial championship was cancelled due to the pandemic. As the highest ranked team on the CTRS standings, Team Sarah Hill was appointed to represent Newfoundland and Labrador at the 2022 Scotties Tournament of Hearts in Thunder Bay, Ontario.

Stacie Curtis returned to Newfoundland for the 2022–23 season and took over the skipping duties of the team, shifting Curtis to third. On tour, the team won the Rick Rowsell Classic and lost in the semifinals of both the Bally Haly Cash Spiel and the Tim Hortons Spitfire Arms Cash Spiel. At the 2023 Newfoundland and Labrador Scotties Tournament of Hearts, Team Curtis finished 3–1 through the round robin, tied for first place with the Heather Strong rink. They then won 11–8 in the final to win the provincial title. This qualified them to represent Newfoundland and Labrador at the 2023 Scotties Tournament of Hearts in Kamloops, British Columbia. There, they finished with a 2–6 record, earning victories over the Yukon's Hailey Birnie and Wild Card #3's Meghan Walter.

For the 2023–24 season, Team Curtis added Jessica Wiseman to their team and used a five-player rotation throughout the season. On tour, the team only qualified in one of their three events, the Rick Rowsell Classic, where they lost the final to the Brooke Godsland rink. At the 2024 Newfoundland and Labrador Scotties Tournament of Hearts, the team finished 3–3 through the double round robin. This qualified them for the semifinal, where they won 5–4 over Sarah Boland to advance to the final. There, they defeated Team Godsland 13–5 to secure their second consecutive provincial title. At the 2024 Scotties Tournament of Hearts in Calgary, Alberta, the team finished eighth in Pool A with a 2–6 record. They secured wins over Prince Edward Island's Jane DiCarlo and Alberta's Selena Sturmay, Alberta's only loss in the round robin.

== Personal life ==
Curtis is a recreational specialist at Eastern Health. She is married to Dylan Curtis.

== Teams ==
Season	Skip	Third	Second	Lead
2007–08	Julie Devereaux	Stephanie Davis	Jessica Mouland	Erica Trickett
2010–11	Erin Porter	Tara O'Brien	Jessica Cunningham	Erica Trickett
2011–12	Erica Trickett	Carolyn Suley	Jessica Cunningham	Nicole Noseworthy
2012–13	Heather Strong	Laura Strong	Erica Trickett	Stephanie Korab
2014–15	Marie Christianson	Erin Porter	Lauren Wasylkiw	Erica Trickett
2016–17	Stacie Curtis	Erin Porter	Julie Deveraux	Erica Trickett
2017–18	Stacie Curtis	Erin Porter	Julie Deveraux	Erica Trickett
2018–19	Erica Trickett	Erin Porter	Brooke Godsland	Julie Devereaux
2019–20	Erica Curtis	Erin Porter	Julie Devereaux	Beth Hamilton
2020–21	Erica Curtis	Mackenzie Glynn	Julie Devereaux	Camille Burt
2021–22	Erica Curtis	Mackenzie Glynn	Julie Hynes	Camille Burt
2022–23	Stacie Curtis	Erica Curtis	Julie Hynes	Camille Burt
2023–24	Stacie Curtis	Erica Curtis	Julie Hynes	Camille Burt
2024–25	Stacie Curtis	Jessica Wiseman	Julie Hynes	Erica Curtis
