= Raunora Westcott =

Canadian curler

- Curler
- Born: May 1, 1976 (age 50); Winnipeg, Manitoba

Team
- Curling club: Granite CC, Winnipeg, MB

Curling career
- Member Association: Manitoba
- Hearts: 5 (2010, 2011, 2017, 2018, 2021)
- Top CTRS ranking: 6th (2016–17)
Medal record
Women's curling
Scotties Tournament of Hearts
Representing Manitoba
Silver medal – second place	2017 St. Catharines

Raunora Westcott (born May 1, 1976) is a Canadian curler from Winnipeg, Manitoba.

== Career ==
=== Juniors ===
Westcott played lead for Team Manitoba (skipped by Kristy Jenion) at the 1996 Canadian Junior Curling Championships. The team finished with a 5-7 record, missing the playoffs.

=== Women's ===
Westcott won her first provincial women's championship in 2010 playing lead on Team Jill Thurston. The team represented Manitoba at the 2010 Scotties Tournament of Hearts, where they finished the round robin with a 7-4 record, and lost in the tiebreaker match.

Westcott joined the Cathy Overton-Clapham rink at second for the next season. With her new team Westcott won the 2011 Manitoba Scotties Tournament of Hearts, her second provincial title in a row. At the 2011 Scotties Tournament of Hearts, Overton-Clapham led the team to a 4-7 record.

Westcott joined the Barb Spencer rink in 2011 playing lead for the team for three seasons. With Spencer, she won the 2011 DeKalb Superspiel, the 2011 Interlake Pharmacy Classic, the 2012 MCT Championships and the 2013 DeKalb Superspiel. They played in the 2013 Canadian Olympic Curling Pre-Trials, where they won just one game.

Westcott joined up with her junior skip (now named Kristy McDonald) in 2014, playing lead. The team played in the 2015 Canada Cup of Curling, going 1-5. When McDonald retired from competitive curling in 2015, the team was taken over by Michelle Englot.

In their first season together, the Englot rink won the 2017 Manitoba Scotties Tournament of Hearts, and went all the way to the final of the 2017 Scotties Tournament of Hearts, after finishing the round robin in first place, with a 10-1 record. The team would lose in the final against Team Ontario, skipped by Rachel Homan.

Their successful season qualified the team for the 2017 Canadian Olympic Curling Trials, but they would have less success there, finishing with a 2-6 record. However, as the Rachel Homan team won the event, and would go on to represent Canada at the Olympics, the Englot rink would be invited to play as Team Canada at the 2018 Scotties Tournament of Hearts, a spot normally reserved for the defending champions. There, the team finished with a 6-5 record, in 6th place, missing the playoffs. Also that season, the team would play in the 2018 Continental Cup of Curling.

In March 2018, Westcott announced she was joining a Winnipeg-based team skipped by Allison Flaxey, with third Kate Cameron and second Taylor McDonald. The team participated in two Slams and finished sixth at the 2019 Manitoba Scotties Tournament of Hearts.

On March 22, 2019, it was announced that Westcott would join Theresa Cannon, Karen Klein and Vanessa Foster for the 2019–20 curling season. The team started the season by missing the playoffs at the 2019 Cargill Curling Training Centre Icebreaker. Next they played in the 2019 Cameron's Brewing Oakville Fall Classic where they lost in the quarterfinals to Daniela Jentsch. The team played in one Grand Slam of Curling event, the 2019 Masters where they missed the playoffs with a 1–3 record. At the 2020 Manitoba Scotties Tournament of Hearts, the team finished with a 2–3 record, missing the playoffs. The team disbanded after the season.

The 2021 Manitoba Scotties were cancelled due to the COVID-19 pandemic in Manitoba, so Curl Manitoba appointed Team Jennifer Jones to represent Manitoba at the 2021 Scotties Tournament of Hearts. A pregnant Dawn McEwen opted to stay at home, moving Jones' alternate Lisa Weagle up to lead and Westcott joined the team as their alternate. At the 2021 Hearts, they finished with a 9–3 record, putting them in a third place tiebreaker match against Alberta, skipped by Laura Walker. Walker defeated Jones 9–8 to advance to the semifinal.

On April 25, 2021, it was announced that Westcott would join former teammate Kristy McDonald for the 2021–22 season with teammates Lisa Blixhavn, Leslie Wilson-Westcott and Lindsay Warkentin.

== Personal life ==
Westcott works in equipment leasing. Westcott is the daughter of Ron Westcott, who competed in 42 Manitoba Curling Championships, and won the 2015 Canadian Masters Curling Championships. Her father was inducted into the Manitoba Curling Hall of Fame in 2016. Her grandmother is Jemima Westcott, who in 2021 became one of Manitoba's supercentenarians when she turned 110, and was the oldest person in Manitoba, before she died at the age of 111.
