= 2020 Newfoundland and Labrador Scotties Tournament of Hearts =

- Host city: St. John's, Newfoundland and Labrador
- Arena: Re/Max Centre
- Dates: January 11–15
- Winner: Team Curtis
- Curling club: Re/Max Centre, St. John's
- Skip: Erica Curtis
- Third: Erin Porter
- Second: Julie Devereaux
- Lead: Beth Hamilton
- Coach: Eugene Trickett
- Finalist: Mackenzie Mitchell

The 2020 Newfoundland and Labrador Women's Curling Championship, the women's provincial curling championship for Newfoundland and Labrador, was held from January 11 to 15 at the Re/Max Centre in St. John's, Newfoundland and Labrador. The winning Erica Curtis rink represented Newfoundland and Labrador at the 2020 Scotties Tournament of Hearts in Moose Jaw, Saskatchewan and finished with a 1–6 record.

== Teams ==
The teams are listed as follows:

Skip	Third	Second	Lead	Club
Erica Curtis	Erin Porter	Julie Devereaux	Beth Hamilton	Re/Max Centre, St. John's
Wendy Dunne	Jennifer Taylor	Andrea Heffernan	Noelle Thomas-Kennell	Re/Max Centre, St. John's
Mackenzie Glynn	Camille Burt	Sarah Cassell	Michelle Taylor	Re/Max Centre, St. John's
Mackenzie Mitchell	Katie Follett	Sarah Chaytor	Claire Hartlen	Re/Max Centre, St. John's
Kelli Sharpe	Brooke Godsland	Lauren Barron	Michelle Jewer	Re/Max Centre, St. John's
Heather Strong	Jessica Wiseman	Sarah Day	Cindy Miller	Re/Max Centre, St. John's

== Round-robin standings ==
Final round-robin standings

Key
Teams to Final
Teams to Tiebreakers

Skip	W	L
Mackenzie Mitchell	5	0
Heather Strong	3	2
Erica Curtis	3	2
Kelli Sharpe	3	2
Mackenzie Glynn	1	4
Wendy Dunne	0	5

== Round-robin results ==
All draws are listed in Newfoundland Time (UTC−03:30).

=== Draw 1 ===
Saturday, January 11, 1:30 pm

Sheet 3	1	2	3	4	5	6	7	8	9	10	11	Final
Mackenzie Glynn	0	0	2	0	0	4	0	3	0	0	0	9
Mackenzie Mitchell	0	1	0	3	1	0	2	0	1	1	2	11

Sheet 4	1	2	3	4	5	6	7	8	9	10	Final
Wendy Dunne	0	0	1	0	1	0	0	1	0	1	4
Kelli Sharpe	0	0	0	3	0	0	1	0	2	0	6

Sheet 5	1	2	3	4	5	6	7	8	9	10	Final
Erica Curtis	0	2	0	2	0	2	0	0	1	X	7
Heather Strong	2	0	1	0	4	0	1	2	0	X	10

=== Draw 2 ===
Sunday, January 12, 8:30 am

Sheet 3	1	2	3	4	5	6	7	8	9	10	Final
Erica Curtis	0	2	0	2	0	1	0	1	2	2	10
Kelli Sharpe	1	0	2	0	3	0	1	0	0	0	7

Sheet 4	1	2	3	4	5	6	7	8	9	10	Final
Mackenzie Glynn	0	0	0	0	1	2	0	1	0	0	4
Heather Strong	0	1	0	1	0	0	3	0	0	2	7

Sheet 5	1	2	3	4	5	6	7	8	9	10	Final
Wendy Dunne	0	1	0	3	0	1	0	0	X	X	5
Mackenzie Mitchell	1	0	1	0	3	0	3	3	X	X	11

=== Draw 3 ===
Sunday, January 12, 1:30 pm

Sheet 3	1	2	3	4	5	6	7	8	9	10	Final
Mackenzie Mitchell	1	0	0	3	0	1	1	2	0	0	8
Heather Strong	0	0	1	0	3	0	0	0	1	2	7

Sheet 4	1	2	3	4	5	6	7	8	9	10	Final
Erica Curtis	0	0	0	7	3	0	4	X	X	X	14
Wendy Dunne	1	0	2	0	0	1	0	X	X	X	4

Sheet 5	1	2	3	4	5	6	7	8	9	10	Final
Mackenzie Glynn	0	2	0	1	1	0	0	0	0	X	4
Kelli Sharpe	2	0	2	0	0	1	1	1	1	X	8

=== Draw 4 ===
Monday, January 13, 1:30 pm

Sheet 3	1	2	3	4	5	6	7	8	9	10	11	Final
Wendy Dunne	0	2	0	3	0	1	0	1	0	1	0	8
Heather Strong	1	0	2	0	2	0	1	0	2	0	1	9

Sheet 4	1	2	3	4	5	6	7	8	9	10	Final
Mackenzie Mitchell	0	0	1	0	2	2	0	0	0	1	6
Kelli Sharpe	0	1	0	1	0	0	1	2	0	0	5

Sheet 5	1	2	3	4	5	6	7	8	9	10	Final
Erica Curtis	0	4	1	0	2	0	4	X	X	X	11
Mackenzie Glynn	2	0	0	1	0	1	0	X	X	X	4

=== Draw 5 ===
Monday, January 13, 7:00 pm

Sheet 3	1	2	3	4	5	6	7	8	9	10	11	Final
Wendy Dunne	0	3	0	1	0	2	0	0	3	0	0	9
Mackenzie Glynn	0	0	1	0	1	0	2	2	0	3	1	10

Sheet 4	1	2	3	4	5	6	7	8	9	10	Final
Erica Curtis	0	0	0	0	0	1	0	0	3	0	4
Mackenzie Mitchell	0	1	0	1	1	0	0	1	0	1	5

Sheet 5	1	2	3	4	5	6	7	8	9	10	11	Final
Kelli Sharpe	0	1	0	1	0	1	1	2	1	0	1	8
Heather Strong	1	0	3	0	2	0	0	0	0	1	0	7

== Tiebreakers ==
Tuesday, January 14, 8:30 am

Sheet 4	1	2	3	4	5	6	7	8	9	10	Final
Erica Curtis	0	1	0	2	3	0	0	0	4	X	10
Kelli Sharpe	1	0	2	0	0	1	1	1	0	X	6

Tuesday, January 14, 2:00 pm

Sheet 4	1	2	3	4	5	6	7	8	9	10	11	Final
Heather Strong	0	0	0	0	0	2	1	1	0	2	0	6
Erica Curtis	0	1	0	0	4	0	0	0	1	0	1	7

== Final ==
Tuesday, January 14, 7:30 pm

Sheet 4	1	2	3	4	5	6	7	8	9	10	Final
Mackenzie Mitchell	0	0	1	0	0	1	0	0	0	X	2
Erica Curtis	0	3	0	1	0	0	1	2	1	X	8

2020 Newfoundland and Labrador Scotties Tournament of Hearts

Erica Curtis
3rd Newfoundland and Labrador Provincial Championship title
