= 2023 Newfoundland and Labrador Scotties Tournament of Hearts =

- Host city: St. John's, Newfoundland and Labrador
- Arena: RE/MAX Centre
- Dates: January 26–29
- Winner: Team Curtis
- Curling club: RE/MAX Centre, St. John's
- Skip: Stacie Curtis
- Third: Erica Curtis
- Second: Julie Hynes
- Lead: Camille Burt
- Finalist: Heather Strong

The 2023 Newfoundland and Labrador Scotties Tournament of Hearts, the women's provincial curling championship for Newfoundland and Labrador, was held from January 26 to 29 at the RE/MAX Centre in St. John's, Newfoundland and Labrador. The winning Stacie Curtis rink represented Newfoundland and Labrador at the 2023 Scotties Tournament of Hearts in Kamloops, British Columbia, and finished eighth in Pool B with a 2–6 record. The event was held in conjunction with the 2023 Newfoundland and Labrador Tankard, the provincial men's championship.

This was the first time since 2021 that the event has been held due to the COVID-19 pandemic in Canada.

== Teams ==
The teams are listed as follows:

| Skip | Third | Second | Lead | Alternate | Club |
|---|---|---|---|---|---|
| Stacie Curtis | Erica Curtis | Julie Hynes | Camille Burt | | RE/MAX Centre, St. John's |
| Sarah Hill | Kelli Sharpe | Beth Hamilton | Adrienne Mercer | Mackenzie Mitchell | RE/MAX Centre, St. John's |
| Heather Strong | Jessica Wiseman | Brooke Godsland | Laura Strong | Katie Follett | RE/MAX Centre, St. John's |

== Round-robin standings ==
Final round-robin standings

Key
| Teams to Final |

| Skip | W | L | PF | PA | EW | EL | BE | SE |
|---|---|---|---|---|---|---|---|---|
| Stacie Curtis | 3 | 1 | 34 | 21 | 17 | 13 | 1 | 4 |
| Heather Strong | 3 | 1 | 32 | 20 | 16 | 12 | 4 | 4 |
| Sarah Hill | 0 | 4 | 11 | 36 | 9 | 17 | 1 | 2 |

== Round-robin results ==
All draw times are listed in Newfoundland Time (UTC−03:30).

=== Draw 1 ===
Thursday, January 26, 1:30 pm

| Sheet 4 | 1 | 2 | 3 | 4 | 5 | 6 | 7 | 8 | 9 | 10 | Final |
|---|---|---|---|---|---|---|---|---|---|---|---|
| Heather Strong | 0 | 0 | 0 | 1 | 0 | 4 | 0 | 0 | 2 | 0 | 7 |
| Stacie Curtis | 0 | 4 | 0 | 0 | 1 | 0 | 2 | 1 | 0 | 1 | 9 |

=== Draw 2 ===
Thursday, January 26, 7:00 pm

| Sheet 5 | 1 | 2 | 3 | 4 | 5 | 6 | 7 | 8 | 9 | 10 | Final |
|---|---|---|---|---|---|---|---|---|---|---|---|
| Sarah Hill | 0 | 1 | 0 | 0 | 2 | 0 | 1 | 0 | X | X | 4 |
| Stacie Curtis | 2 | 0 | 2 | 2 | 0 | 2 | 0 | 2 | X | X | 10 |

=== Draw 3 ===
Friday, January 27, 1:30 pm

| Sheet 4 | 1 | 2 | 3 | 4 | 5 | 6 | 7 | 8 | 9 | 10 | Final |
|---|---|---|---|---|---|---|---|---|---|---|---|
| Sarah Hill | 0 | 1 | 0 | 0 | 0 | 2 | 0 | 0 | 0 | X | 3 |
| Heather Strong | 0 | 0 | 1 | 1 | 0 | 0 | 2 | 2 | 2 | X | 8 |

=== Draw 4 ===
Friday, January 27, 7:00 pm

| Sheet 5 | 1 | 2 | 3 | 4 | 5 | 6 | 7 | 8 | 9 | 10 | Final |
|---|---|---|---|---|---|---|---|---|---|---|---|
| Stacie Curtis | 0 | 2 | 0 | 0 | 0 | 3 | 0 | 1 | 0 | 0 | 6 |
| Heather Strong | 1 | 0 | 0 | 0 | 2 | 0 | 2 | 0 | 2 | 1 | 8 |

=== Draw 5 ===
Saturday, January 28, 9:00 am

| Sheet 4 | 1 | 2 | 3 | 4 | 5 | 6 | 7 | 8 | 9 | 10 | Final |
|---|---|---|---|---|---|---|---|---|---|---|---|
| Stacie Curtis | 3 | 1 | 1 | 0 | 4 | 0 | X | X | X | X | 9 |
| Sarah Hill | 0 | 0 | 0 | 1 | 0 | 1 | X | X | X | X | 2 |

=== Draw 6 ===
Saturday, January 28, 7:30 pm

| Sheet 5 | 1 | 2 | 3 | 4 | 5 | 6 | 7 | 8 | 9 | 10 | Final |
|---|---|---|---|---|---|---|---|---|---|---|---|
| Sarah Hill | 0 | 0 | 0 | 1 | 1 | X | X | X | X | X | 2 |
| Heather Strong | 4 | 1 | 4 | 0 | 0 | X | X | X | X | X | 9 |

== Playoff ==
| Final |
| 1 | Stacie Curtis | 11 |
| 2 | Heather Strong | 8 |

=== Final ===
Sunday, January 29, 2:00 pm

| Sheet 4 | 1 | 2 | 3 | 4 | 5 | 6 | 7 | 8 | 9 | 10 | Final |
|---|---|---|---|---|---|---|---|---|---|---|---|
| Stacie Curtis | 3 | 0 | 1 | 0 | 1 | 0 | 2 | 0 | 4 | X | 11 |
| Heather Strong | 0 | 2 | 0 | 1 | 0 | 3 | 0 | 2 | 0 | X | 8 |

2023 Newfoundland and Labrador Scotties Tournament of Hearts

Stacie Curtis
6th Newfoundland and Labrador Provincial Championship title
