= 2017 Scotties Tournament of Hearts =

National championship sporting tournament

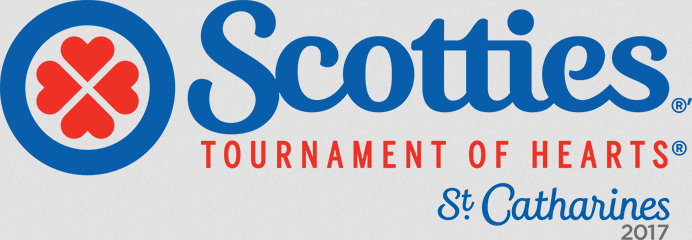
- Host city: St. Catharines, Ontario
- Arena: Meridian Centre
- Dates: February 16–26
- Attendance: 56,804
- Winner: Ontario
- Curling club: Ottawa Curling Club, Ottawa
- Skip: Rachel Homan
- Third: Emma Miskew
- Second: Joanne Courtney
- Lead: Lisa Weagle
- Alternate: Cheryl Kreviazuk
- Coach: Adam Kingsbury
- Finalist: Manitoba (Michelle Englot)

The 2017 Scotties Tournament of Hearts was held from February 16 to 26 at the Meridian Centre in St. Catharines, Ontario. The Rachel Homan rink, representing Ontario, won their third national title; with Homan becoming the youngest skip, man or woman, to ever win three national championships. Her team represented Canada at the 2017 World Women's Curling Championship in Beijing from March 18 to 26.

In the final, Ontario, skipped by Rachel Homan, defeated Manitoba's Michelle Englot 8–6 in an extra end to win her third national championship. Heading into the game, Manitoba had beaten Ontario twice already in the tournament, once in the round robin and again in the 1 vs. 2 game. In the first end, Englot attempted to blank the end, but her rock stuck around in the 12-foot circle, forcing Manitoba to take a single, and lose last rock advantage to Ontario. In the second, facing a Manitoba shot-rock, Homan made an incredible cross-house double takeout at the perfect angle to score three to take a 3–1 lead early on. Manitoba clawed back however with a single in the third, and stolen points in the fifth and seventh to take a 4–3 lead, but Ontario scored two in the eighth to go up 5–4. In the ninth, Englot missed a thin takeout attempt on her first throw, and wrecked on a guard on her last, giving up a steal of one to Ontario heading into the 10th, down 6–4. In the 10th end, both teams' thirds, Ontario's Emma Miskew, and Manitoba's Kate Cameron made double takeouts to help their teams out. Facing three Manitoba stones on her last, Homan made a clutch double takeout to prevent Manitoba possible scoring three points and the win. Englot then made her draw to tie the game, forcing an extra end. In the 11th end, Englot drew to the back-four behind cover on her last stone to sit shot-rock. Homan opted to throw a short run-back of her own stone on to shot rock, which she made, winning the game. There were 4,143 spectators on hand to witness the final.

== Teams ==
The 2017 Scotties was notable for the presence of many veteran skips from previous Canadian Women's Championship tournaments. Shannon Kleibrink made her 5th Scotties appearance after defeating the 2-time Scotties Silver medallist Valerie Sweeting in the Alberta final; however, issues with back pain limited her performance. Marla Mallett of British Columbia and Stacie Curtis of Newfoundland and Labrador made their 4th Scotties appearances, as well as Mary Mattatall who was in her 5th as Team Nova Scotia after upsetting last year's Nova Scotia Champion Jill Brothers. PEI's Robyn MacPhee made her 8th Scotties appearance, Ève Bélisle of Quebec made her 3rd, and Kerry Galusha of the Northwest Territories made her 14th Scotties appearance. Geneva Chislett returned again for Team Nunavut, as did Sarah Koltun for the Yukon. The only two teams to make their Scotties debuts were Penny Barker of Saskatchewan and Melissa Adams of New Brunswick. Notably absent was the 5-time Scotties Champion and 12-time Manitoba Scotties champion, Jennifer Jones, who was defeated in the Manitoba Scotties Semifinal by Darcy Robertson, who lost to Michelle Englot (9-time Saskatchewan Scotties Champion) in the final. The headline teams for this year's Scotties were last year's Silver medallist Krista McCarville who defeated Tracy Fleury in Northern Ontario for the second year in a row, the 2-time Scotties Champion Rachel Homan who won the southern Ontario final against Jacqueline Harrison, and the defending Champions Chelsea Carey of Team Canada.

The teams are listed as follows:

Canada	Alberta	British Columbia
The Glencoe Club, Calgary Skip: Chelsea Carey; Third: Amy Nixon; Second: Jocelyn Peterman; Lead: Laine Peters; Alternate: Susan O'Connor	Okotoks CC, Okotoks Skip: Shannon Kleibrink (Note: Kleibrink skipped Alberta during Draws 2 and 4 and the first four ends of Draw 17, but was officially recorded as the skip of Team Alberta. Nedohin skipped the other matches of the tournament, the rest of Draw 17, and threw lead stones in Draw 4.); Third: Lisa Eyamie; Second: Sarah Wilkes; Lead: Alison Thiessen; Alternate: Heather Nedohin	Golden Ears WC, Maple Ridge Skip: Marla Mallett; Third: Shannon Aleksic; Second: Brette Richards; Lead: Blaine de Jager; Alternate: Kristen Recksiedler
Manitoba	New Brunswick	Newfoundland and Labrador
Granite CC, Winnipeg Skip: Michelle Englot; Third: Kate Cameron; Second: Leslie Wilson-Westcott; Lead: Raunora Westcott; Alternate: Krysten Karwacki	Capital WC, Fredericton Skip: Melissa Adams; Third: Jennifer Armstrong; Second: Cathlia Ward; Lead: Katie Forward; Alternate: Jillian Babin-Keough	St. John's CC, St. John's Skip: Stacie Curtis; Third: Erin Porter; Second: Julie Devereaux; Lead: Erica Trickett; Alternate: Shelley Hardy
Northern Ontario	Nova Scotia	Ontario
Fort William CC, Thunder Bay Skip: Krista McCarville; Third: Kendra Lilly; Second: Ashley Sippala; Lead: Sarah Potts; Alternate: Oye-Sem Won Briand	Windsor CC, Windsor Skip: Mary Mattatall; Third: Marg Cutcliffe; Second: Jill Alcoe-Holland; Lead: Andrea Saulnier; Alternate: Julie McEvoy	Ottawa CC, Ottawa Skip: Rachel Homan; Third: Emma Miskew; Second: Joanne Courtney; Lead: Lisa Weagle; Alternate: Cheryl Kreviazuk
Prince Edward Island	Quebec	Saskatchewan
Charlottetown CC, Charlottetown Skip: Robyn MacPhee; Third: Sarah Fullerton; Second: Meaghan Hughes; Lead: Michelle McQuaid; Alternate: Rebecca Jean MacDonald	TMR CC, Mount Royal; Glenmore CC, Dollard-des-Ormeaux Skip: Ève Bélisle; Third: Lauren Mann; Second: Trish Hill; Lead: Brittany O'Rourke; Alternate: Pamela Nugent	Moose Jaw Ford CC, Moose Jaw Skip: Penny Barker; Third: Deanna Doig; Second: Lorraine Schneider; Lead: Danielle Sicinski; Alternate: Amber Holland
Northwest Territories	Nunavut	Yukon
Yellowknife CC, Yellowknife Skip: Kerry Galusha; Third: Megan Koehler; Second: Danielle Derry; Lead: Sharon Cormier; Alternate: Shona Barbour	Iqaluit CC, Iqaluit Skip: Geneva Chislett; Third: Denise Hutchings; Second: Robyn Mackey; Lead: Jenine Bodner; Alternate: Sadie Pinksen	Whitehorse CC, Whitehorse Skip: Sarah Koltun; Third: Chelsea Duncan; Second: Patty Wallingham; Lead: Jenna Duncan; Alternate: Helen Strong

=== CTRS ranking ===
Member Association (Skip)	Rank	Points
Ontario (Homan)	2	349.603
Manitoba (Englot)	6	223.268
Canada (Carey)	13	155.356
Alberta (Kleibrink)	15	150.770
Northern Ontario (McCarville)	17	132.405
British Columbia (Mallett)	28	81.443
Prince Edward Island (MacPhee)	29	80.505
Saskatchewan (Barker)	44	52.567
Nova Scotia (Mattatall)	50	46.037
Quebec (Bélisle)	52	43.513
Yukon (Koltun)	77	20.958
New Brunswick (Adams)	85	16.916
Newfoundland and Labrador (Curtis)	123	3.859
Northwest Territories (Galusha)	129	1.934
Nunavut (Chislett)	NR	0.000

== Map of teams ==
Team Canada Provincial Winners

== Pre-qualifying tournament ==
=== Standings ===
Locale	Skip	W	L	PF	PA	EW	EL	BE	SE	S%
New Brunswick	Melissa Adams	3	0	29	17	16	11	0	3	82%
Northwest Territories	Kerry Galusha	2	1	23	17	12	12	1	5	76%
Yukon	Sarah Koltun	1	2	25	19	15	11	0	5	73%
Nunavut	Geneva Chislett	0	3	9	33	7	16	1	0	49%

=== Results ===
All draw times are listed in Eastern Standard Time (UTC−5).

==== Draw 1 ====
Thursday, February 16, 6:30 pm

Sheet A	1	2	3	4	5	6	7	8	9	10	Final
Nunavut (Chislett)	0	1	0	1	0	1	0	3	0	X	6
New Brunswick (Adams) 🔨	2	0	4	0	2	0	1	0	2	X	11

Sheet B	1	2	3	4	5	6	7	8	9	10	Final
Northwest Territories (Galusha)	0	0	2	0	4	0	2	1	0	X	9
Yukon (Koltun) 🔨	1	1	0	1	0	2	0	0	1	X	6

==== Draw 2 ====
Friday, February 17, 8:00 am

Sheet C	1	2	3	4	5	6	7	8	9	10	Final
New Brunswick (Adams)	0	1	0	1	2	1	0	1	0	3	9
Yukon (Koltun) 🔨	2	0	2	0	0	0	2	0	1	0	7

Sheet D	1	2	3	4	5	6	7	8	9	10	Final
Nunavut (Chislett) 🔨	1	0	0	0	0	0	0	1	X	X	2
Northwest Territories (Galusha)	0	3	1	0	4	1	1	0	X	X	10

==== Draw 3 ====
Friday, February 17, 4:00 pm

Sheet A	1	2	3	4	5	6	7	8	9	10	Final
Yukon (Koltun) 🔨	3	0	3	1	3	1	1	X	X	X	12
Nunavut (Chislett)	0	1	0	0	0	0	0	X	X	X	1

Sheet B	1	2	3	4	5	6	7	8	9	10	Final
New Brunswick (Adams) 🔨	1	0	1	0	0	3	2	0	2	X	9
Northwest Territories (Galusha)	0	1	0	0	1	0	0	2	0	X	4

=== Pre-qualifying final ===
Saturday, February 18, 2:30 pm

Sheet D	1	2	3	4	5	6	7	8	9	10	Final
New Brunswick (Adams) 🔨	0	0	1	0	0	1	0	0	1	0	3
Northwest Territories (Galusha)	0	1	0	1	1	0	0	1	0	1	5

== Round robin standings ==
Final Round Robin Standings

Key
Teams to Playoffs

Locale	Skip	W	L	PF	PA	EW	EL	BE	SE	S%
Manitoba	Michelle Englot	10	1	92	52	55	38	7	20	81%
Ontario	Rachel Homan	10	1	76	45	49	34	16	19	85%
Canada	Chelsea Carey	9	2	79	58	52	41	12	12	83%
Northern Ontario	Krista McCarville	8	3	81	59	53	40	11	17	82%
Quebec	Ève Bélisle	7	4	74	61	45	43	13	10	77%
Alberta	Heather Nedohin	5	6	74	71	46	46	12	10	81%
Newfoundland and Labrador	Stacie Curtis	5	6	64	66	38	47	14	7	77%
Northwest Territories	Kerry Galusha	5	6	65	76	43	47	15	9	75%
Prince Edward Island	Robyn MacPhee	3	8	63	82	42	53	10	10	75%
Nova Scotia	Mary Mattatall	2	9	54	89	38	47	14	8	73%
British Columbia	Marla Mallett	1	10	52	90	34	53	13	6	78%
Saskatchewan	Penny Barker	1	10	61	86	45	52	10	10	75%

== Round robin results ==
All draw times are listed in Eastern Standard Time (UTC−5).

=== Draw 1 ===
Saturday, February 18, 2:30 pm

Sheet A	1	2	3	4	5	6	7	8	9	10	Final
Manitoba (Englot)	0	0	1	0	0	3	0	1	0	2	7
Quebec (Bélisle) 🔨	0	1	0	1	1	0	2	0	1	0	6

Sheet B	1	2	3	4	5	6	7	8	9	10	11	Final
Ontario (Homan) 🔨	1	1	0	2	0	0	0	1	0	0	2	7
Canada (Carey)	0	0	1	0	0	1	2	0	0	1	0	5

Sheet C	1	2	3	4	5	6	7	8	9	10	Final
Nova Scotia (Mattatall) 🔨	0	2	0	0	1	0	0	1	0	1	5
British Columbia (Mallett)	0	0	1	0	0	1	0	0	2	0	4

=== Draw 2 ===
Saturday, February 18, 7:30 pm

Sheet A	1	2	3	4	5	6	7	8	9	10	Final
Northwest Territories (Galusha) 🔨	2	0	0	2	0	2	2	0	1	X	9
Prince Edward Island (MacPhee)	0	0	1	0	2	0	0	1	0	X	4

Sheet B	1	2	3	4	5	6	7	8	9	10	Final
Northern Ontario (McCarville) 🔨	0	3	0	1	0	0	2	0	0	X	6
Alberta (Kleibrink)	0	0	2	0	2	3	0	3	1	X	11

Sheet C	1	2	3	4	5	6	7	8	9	10	Final
Saskatchewan (Barker)	1	0	0	1	0	0	1	0	1	0	4
Newfoundland and Labrador (Curtis) 🔨	0	2	0	0	1	0	0	3	0	1	7

=== Draw 3 ===
Sunday, February 19, 9:30 am

Sheet A	1	2	3	4	5	6	7	8	9	10	Final
Canada (Carey) 🔨	0	2	0	0	0	1	0	2	1	X	6
Nova Scotia (Mattatall)	0	0	0	2	1	0	1	0	0	X	4

Sheet B	1	2	3	4	5	6	7	8	9	10	Final
Manitoba (Englot)	0	0	0	3	0	1	0	3	0	1	8
Saskatchewan (Barker) 🔨	0	0	2	0	1	0	1	0	1	0	5

Sheet C	1	2	3	4	5	6	7	8	9	10	Final
Northern Ontario (McCarville) 🔨	1	0	0	2	1	1	0	3	1	X	9
Quebec (Bélisle)	0	2	1	0	0	0	1	0	0	X	4

Sheet D	1	2	3	4	5	6	7	8	9	10	Final
British Columbia (Mallett)	0	0	3	0	0	0	0	0	X	X	3
Ontario (Homan) 🔨	0	2	0	2	2	0	2	1	X	X	9

=== Draw 4 ===
Sunday, February 19, 2:30 pm

Sheet A	1	2	3	4	5	6	7	8	9	10	Final
Prince Edward Island (MacPhee) 🔨	1	0	0	1	0	0	1	0	0	X	3
Ontario (Homan)	0	1	2	0	1	1	0	2	1	X	8

Sheet B	1	2	3	4	5	6	7	8	9	10	Final
British Columbia (Mallett) 🔨	1	0	1	0	0	2	1	0	X	X	5
Newfoundland and Labrador (Curtis)	0	2	0	5	1	0	0	2	X	X	10

Sheet C	1	2	3	4	5	6	7	8	9	10	Final
Manitoba (Englot) 🔨	0	1	0	1	1	0	2	0	0	4	9
Northwest Territories (Galusha)	0	0	1	0	0	1	0	1	1	0	4

Sheet D	1	2	3	4	5	6	7	8	9	10	Final
Alberta (Kleibrink)	0	1	0	2	1	0	0	1	X	X	5
Quebec (Bélisle) 🔨	2	0	2	0	0	0	5	0	X	X	9

=== Draw 5 ===
Sunday, February 19, 7:30 pm

Sheet A	1	2	3	4	5	6	7	8	9	10	Final
Alberta (Nedohin) 🔨	0	1	0	0	2	0	1	1	0	X	5
Newfoundland and Labrador (Curtis)	0	0	1	0	0	1	0	0	1	X	3

Sheet B	1	2	3	4	5	6	7	8	9	10	Final
Nova Scotia (Mattatall)	0	1	0	1	0	1	0	2	1	0	6
Northwest Territories (Galusha) 🔨	2	0	1	0	2	0	1	0	0	2	8

Sheet C	1	2	3	4	5	6	7	8	9	10	11	Final
Canada (Carey)	0	0	2	0	1	0	1	0	3	0	1	8
Prince Edward Island (MacPhee) 🔨	1	1	0	0	0	1	0	1	0	3	0	7

Sheet D	1	2	3	4	5	6	7	8	9	10	Final
Northern Ontario (McCarville) 🔨	0	2	0	1	1	2	1	0	1	X	8
Saskatchewan (Barker)	0	0	1	0	0	0	0	2	0	X	3

=== Draw 6 ===
Monday, February 20, 2:30 pm

Sheet A	1	2	3	4	5	6	7	8	9	10	Final
British Columbia (Mallett) 🔨	0	0	2	4	0	0	1	0	2	0	9
Northwest Territories (Galusha)	1	1	0	0	3	3	0	1	0	3	12

Sheet B	1	2	3	4	5	6	7	8	9	10	Final
Quebec (Bélisle) 🔨	0	2	3	0	0	0	2	0	0	1	8
Prince Edward Island (MacPhee)	1	0	0	2	1	0	0	3	0	0	7

Sheet C	1	2	3	4	5	6	7	8	9	10	Final
Ontario (Homan)	0	0	2	0	1	1	1	1	0	X	6
Alberta (Nedohin) 🔨	0	1	0	2	0	0	0	0	1	X	4

Sheet D	1	2	3	4	5	6	7	8	9	10	Final
Newfoundland and Labrador (Curtis)	0	0	1	1	3	0	0	0	0	0	5
Manitoba (Englot) 🔨	1	2	0	0	0	2	1	1	1	2	10

=== Draw 7 ===
Monday, February 20, 7:30 pm

Sheet A	1	2	3	4	5	6	7	8	9	10	Final
Northern Ontario (McCarville)	1	0	2	0	3	0	0	0	1	0	7
Manitoba (Englot) 🔨	0	1	0	1	0	2	1	1	0	2	8

Sheet B	1	2	3	4	5	6	7	8	9	10	Final
Canada (Carey)	1	0	0	2	0	0	1	1	1	X	6
British Columbia (Mallett) 🔨	0	0	2	0	0	0	0	0	0	X	2

Sheet C	1	2	3	4	5	6	7	8	9	10	Final
Quebec (Bélisle) 🔨	3	0	1	0	0	1	1	0	0	1	7
Saskatchewan (Barker)	0	1	0	1	1	0	0	1	1	0	5

Sheet D	1	2	3	4	5	6	7	8	9	10	Final
Ontario (Homan) 🔨	2	0	0	0	2	1	0	4	X	X	9
Nova Scotia (Mattatall)	0	1	0	1	0	0	1	0	X	X	3

=== Draw 8 ===
Tuesday, February 21, 9:30 am

Sheet A	1	2	3	4	5	6	7	8	9	10	Final
Nova Scotia (Mattatall) 🔨	0	0	0	0	3	0	0	0	1	X	4
Prince Edward Island (MacPhee)	0	0	1	3	0	2	1	2	0	X	9

Sheet B	1	2	3	4	5	6	7	8	9	10	Final
Newfoundland and Labrador (Curtis)	0	0	0	0	0	0	2	0	1	X	3
Northern Ontario (McCarville) 🔨	0	0	1	1	1	1	0	2	0	X	6

Sheet C	1	2	3	4	5	6	7	8	9	10	Final
Northwest Territories (Galusha)	0	0	1	0	1	0	2	0	0	X	4
Canada (Carey) 🔨	1	0	0	2	0	1	0	2	1	X	7

Sheet D	1	2	3	4	5	6	7	8	9	10	11	Final
Saskatchewan (Barker)	0	0	2	1	0	3	0	1	0	0	0	7
Alberta (Nedohin) 🔨	0	1	0	0	2	0	2	0	1	1	3	10

=== Draw 9 ===
Tuesday, February 21, 2:30 pm

Sheet A	1	2	3	4	5	6	7	8	9	10	Final
Newfoundland and Labrador (Curtis) 🔨	2	0	0	0	1	0	1	0	0	X	4
Quebec (Bélisle)	0	1	1	0	0	2	0	2	1	X	7

Sheet B	1	2	3	4	5	6	7	8	9	10	Final
Northwest Territories (Galusha)	0	0	2	1	0	0	1	0	0	X	4
Ontario (Homan) 🔨	1	0	0	0	2	2	0	1	1	X	7

Sheet C	1	2	3	4	5	6	7	8	9	10	Final
Alberta (Nedohin) 🔨	0	0	2	1	0	1	0	1	0	0	5
Manitoba (Englot)	0	1	0	0	3	0	1	0	2	2	9

Sheet D	1	2	3	4	5	6	7	8	9	10	Final
Prince Edward Island (MacPhee) 🔨	3	0	0	1	0	0	2	1	0	1	8
British Columbia (Mallett)	0	2	2	0	1	1	0	0	1	0	7

=== Draw 10 ===
Tuesday, February 21, 7:30 pm

Sheet A	1	2	3	4	5	6	7	8	9	10	Final
Ontario (Homan)	1	0	2	0	2	0	0	2	0	X	7
Saskatchewan (Barker) 🔨	0	1	0	0	0	2	0	0	1	X	4

Sheet B	1	2	3	4	5	6	7	8	9	10	Final
Quebec (Bélisle) 🔨	0	0	2	0	2	0	4	4	X	X	12
Nova Scotia (Mattatall)	1	1	0	2	0	2	0	0	X	X	6

Sheet C	1	2	3	4	5	6	7	8	9	10	Final
Northern Ontario (McCarville) 🔨	1	0	4	1	1	0	0	1	X	X	8
British Columbia (Mallett)	0	1	0	0	0	1	1	0	X	X	3

Sheet D	1	2	3	4	5	6	7	8	9	10	Final
Manitoba (Englot) 🔨	1	0	1	0	0	0	1	2	2	0	7
Canada (Carey)	0	2	0	1	1	2	0	0	0	2	8

=== Draw 11 ===
Wednesday, February 22, 9:30 am

Sheet A	1	2	3	4	5	6	7	8	9	10	Final
Alberta (Nedohin) 🔨	1	0	0	3	3	0	4	0	X	X	11
British Columbia (Mallett)	0	1	0	0	0	2	0	2	X	X	5

Sheet B	1	2	3	4	5	6	7	8	9	10	Final
Prince Edward Island (MacPhee)	0	0	2	0	0	0	0	0	X	X	2
Manitoba (Englot) 🔨	0	1	0	1	4	1	1	2	X	X	10

Sheet C	1	2	3	4	5	6	7	8	9	10	Final
Newfoundland and Labrador (Curtis) 🔨	1	0	0	0	0	1	0	0	1	X	3
Ontario (Homan)	0	2	0	0	1	0	1	2	0	X	6

Sheet D	1	2	3	4	5	6	7	8	9	10	Final
Quebec (Bélisle) 🔨	1	0	0	0	2	2	0	2	X	X	7
Northwest Territories (Galusha)	0	0	1	0	0	0	1	0	X	X	2

=== Draw 12 ===
Wednesday, February 22, 2:30 pm

Sheet A	1	2	3	4	5	6	7	8	9	10	Final
Quebec (Bélisle)	0	0	1	0	1	0	1	0	2	0	5
Canada (Carey) 🔨	0	2	0	1	0	1	0	2	0	0	6

Sheet B	1	2	3	4	5	6	7	8	9	10	11	Final
British Columbia (Mallett)	0	1	0	0	1	0	3	1	0	0	1	7
Saskatchewan (Barker) 🔨	2	0	0	1	0	1	0	0	1	1	0	6

Sheet C	1	2	3	4	5	6	7	8	9	10	Final
Manitoba (Englot) 🔨	0	1	0	3	0	3	1	0	X	X	8
Nova Scotia (Mattatall)	0	0	1	0	1	0	0	1	X	X	3

Sheet D	1	2	3	4	5	6	7	8	9	10	11	Final
Northern Ontario (McCarville)	0	0	1	0	1	2	0	1	0	1	0	6
Ontario (Homan) 🔨	0	1	0	3	0	0	2	0	0	0	1	7

=== Draw 13 ===
Wednesday, February 22, 7:30 pm

Sheet A	1	2	3	4	5	6	7	8	9	10	11	Final
Prince Edward Island (MacPhee) 🔨	1	0	2	0	0	0	1	0	2	0	0	6
Northern Ontario (McCarville)	0	1	0	1	0	1	0	1	0	2	1	7

Sheet B	1	2	3	4	5	6	7	8	9	10	Final
Newfoundland and Labrador (Curtis)	0	1	0	2	0	0	2	0	0	X	5
Canada (Carey) 🔨	1	0	3	0	3	2	0	1	1	X	11

Sheet C	1	2	3	4	5	6	7	8	9	10	11	Final
Saskatchewan (Barker)	2	0	2	0	1	0	1	0	0	1	0	7
Northwest Territories (Galusha) 🔨	0	0	0	3	0	3	0	1	0	0	1	8

Sheet D	1	2	3	4	5	6	7	8	9	10	Final
Nova Scotia (Mattatall)	1	0	0	3	0	2	2	1	0	2	11
Alberta (Nedohin) 🔨	0	2	3	0	4	0	0	0	1	0	10

=== Draw 14 ===
Thursday, February 23, 9:30 am

Sheet A	1	2	3	4	5	6	7	8	9	10	Final
Northwest Territories (Galusha)	0	0	0	0	1	0	2	1	0	X	4
Newfoundland and Labrador (Curtis) 🔨	2	0	0	2	0	3	0	0	0	X	7

Sheet B	1	2	3	4	5	6	7	8	9	10	Final
Ontario (Homan) 🔨	0	1	0	2	1	0	0	0	1	X	5
Quebec (Bélisle)	0	0	0	0	0	1	0	0	0	X	1

Sheet C	1	2	3	4	5	6	7	8	9	10	Final
Prince Edward Island (MacPhee)	0	1	0	0	1	0	1	0	1	0	4
Alberta (Nedohin) 🔨	1	0	1	0	0	2	0	1	0	1	6

Sheet D	1	2	3	4	5	6	7	8	9	10	Final
British Columbia (Mallett)	0	0	1	0	0	1	0	0	X	X	2
Manitoba (Englot) 🔨	0	2	0	1	0	0	2	2	X	X	7

=== Draw 15 ===
Thursday, February 23, 2:30 pm

Sheet A	1	2	3	4	5	6	7	8	9	10	Final
Saskatchewan (Barker)	0	1	0	0	4	1	3	0	1	X	10
Nova Scotia (Mattatall) 🔨	1	0	2	0	0	0	0	1	0	X	4

Sheet B	1	2	3	4	5	6	7	8	9	10	Final
Alberta (Nedohin) 🔨	0	0	1	0	1	1	0	0	0	0	3
Northwest Territories (Galusha)	1	0	0	1	0	0	0	1	0	1	4

Sheet C	1	2	3	4	5	6	7	8	9	10	Final
Canada (Carey)	0	0	1	0	1	0	1	0	1	X	4
Northern Ontario (McCarville) 🔨	3	0	0	1	0	3	0	1	0	X	8

Sheet D	1	2	3	4	5	6	7	8	9	10	Final
Prince Edward Island (MacPhee)	0	0	3	0	1	0	0	0	X	X	4
Newfoundland and Labrador (Curtis) 🔨	2	1	0	2	0	0	3	2	X	X	10

=== Draw 16 ===
Thursday, February 23, 7:30 pm

Sheet A	1	2	3	4	5	6	7	8	9	10	Final
Manitoba (Englot) 🔨	4	0	1	1	1	0	2	0	X	X	9
Ontario (Homan)	0	2	0	0	0	2	0	1	X	X	5

Sheet B	1	2	3	4	5	6	7	8	9	10	Final
Nova Scotia (Mattatall)	0	0	1	0	0	0	1	0	2	0	4
Northern Ontario (McCarville) 🔨	2	0	0	0	1	0	0	1	0	2	6

Sheet C	1	2	3	4	5	6	7	8	9	10	Final
British Columbia (Mallett)	0	2	0	2	0	0	0	1	0	0	5
Quebec (Bélisle) 🔨	1	0	2	0	0	1	2	0	1	1	8

Sheet D	1	2	3	4	5	6	7	8	9	10	Final
Canada (Carey) 🔨	2	0	3	0	3	0	1	0	2	X	11
Saskatchewan (Barker)	0	1	0	1	0	1	0	2	0	X	5

=== Draw 17 ===
Friday, February 24, 9:30 am

Sheet A	1	2	3	4	5	6	7	8	9	10	Final
Canada (Carey) 🔨	1	0	0	1	0	2	0	2	0	1	7
Alberta (Nedohin)	0	1	0	0	1	0	1	0	1	0	4

Sheet B	1	2	3	4	5	6	7	8	9	10	Final
Saskatchewan (Barker)	1	0	0	1	0	0	1	0	2	0	5
Prince Edward Island (MacPhee) 🔨	0	1	1	0	2	1	0	1	0	3	9

Sheet C	1	2	3	4	5	6	7	8	9	10	Final
Nova Scotia (Mattatall)	0	0	1	0	1	0	0	2	0	X	4
Newfoundland and Labrador (Curtis) 🔨	0	1	0	1	0	1	1	0	3	X	7

Sheet D	1	2	3	4	5	6	7	8	9	10	Final
Northwest Territories (Galusha)	0	0	1	0	2	0	2	1	0	X	6
Northern Ontario (McCarville) 🔨	3	1	0	2	0	3	0	0	1	X	10

== Playoffs ==
Page playoff system
1	Manitoba	9
2	Ontario	8
3	Canada	1
4	Northern Ontario	8

Semifinal
2	Ontario	7
4	Northern Ontario	5

Final
1	Manitoba	6
2	Ontario	8

Bronze Medal Game
3	Canada	7
4	Northern Ontario	4

=== 1 vs. 2 ===
Friday, February 24, 7:30 pm

Sheet C	1	2	3	4	5	6	7	8	9	10	Final
Manitoba (Englot) 🔨	2	0	2	1	0	3	0	1	0	0	9
Ontario (Homan)	0	2	0	0	2	0	2	0	1	1	8

Player percentages
Manitoba		Ontario	
Raunora Westcott	78%	Lisa Weagle	93%
Leslie Wilson-Westcott	80%	Joanne Courtney	84%
Kate Cameron	86%	Emma Miskew	76%
Michelle Englot	86%	Rachel Homan	80%
Total	83%	Total	83%

=== 3 vs. 4 ===
Saturday, February 25, 2:30 pm

Sheet C	1	2	3	4	5	6	7	8	9	10	Final
Canada (Carey) 🔨	0	0	0	0	0	0	0	1	0	X	1
Northern Ontario (McCarville)	0	0	1	1	2	3	0	0	1	X	8

Player percentages
Canada		Northern Ontario	
Laine Peters	79%	Sarah Potts	88%
Jocelyn Peterman	89%	Ashley Sippala	99%
Amy Nixon	71%	Kendra Lilly	92%
Chelsea Carey	68%	Krista McCarville	93%
Total	77%	Total	93%

=== Semifinal ===
Saturday, February 25, 7:30 pm

Sheet C	1	2	3	4	5	6	7	8	9	10	Final
Northern Ontario (McCarville)	0	0	2	0	0	0	1	1	0	1	5
Ontario (Homan) 🔨	0	4	0	0	2	0	0	0	1	0	7

Player percentages
Northern Ontario		Ontario	
Sarah Potts	98%	Lisa Weagle	84%
Ashley Sippala	91%	Joanne Courtney	98%
Kendra Lilly	86%	Emma Miskew	93%
Krista McCarville	86%	Rachel Homan	89%
Total	90%	Total	91%

=== Bronze medal game ===
Sunday, February 26, 2:30 pm

Sheet C	1	2	3	4	5	6	7	8	9	10	Final
Canada (Carey)	0	1	0	0	0	3	2	0	1	X	7
Northern Ontario (McCarville) 🔨	1	0	0	0	1	0	0	2	0	X	4

Player percentages
Canada		Northern Ontario	
Laine Peters	89%	Sarah Potts	91%
Jocelyn Peterman	89%	Ashley Sippala	83%
Amy Nixon	84%	Kendra Lilly	86%
Chelsea Carey	79%	Krista McCarville	74%
Total	85%	Total	84%

=== Final ===
Sunday, February 26, 7:30 pm

Sheet C	1	2	3	4	5	6	7	8	9	10	11	Final
Manitoba (Englot) 🔨	1	0	1	0	1	0	1	0	0	2	0	6
Ontario (Homan)	0	3	0	0	0	0	0	2	1	0	2	8

Player percentages
Manitoba		Ontario	
Raunora Westcott	97%	Lisa Weagle	89%
Leslie Wilson-Westcott	86%	Joanne Courtney	92%
Kate Cameron	86%	Emma Miskew	86%
Michelle Englot	70%	Rachel Homan	85%
Total	85%	Total	88%

== Statistics ==
Round Robin only

Key
First All-Star Team
Second All-Star Team

Leads	%
(British Columbia) Blaine de Jager	86
(Ontario) Lisa Weagle	86
(Canada) Laine Peters	86
(Northern Ontario) Sarah Potts	84
(Manitoba) Raunora Westcott	84

Seconds	%
(Ontario) Joanne Courtney	85
(Alberta) Sarah Wilkes	84
(Canada) Jocelyn Peterman	83
(Newfoundland and Labrador) Julie Devereaux	81
(Northern Ontario) Ashley Sippala	81

Thirds	%
(Ontario) Emma Miskew	84
(British Columbia) Shannon Aleksic	82
(Manitoba) Kate Cameron	81
(Canada) Amy Nixon	81
(Northern Ontario) Kendra Lilly	80

Skips	%
(Ontario) Rachel Homan	84
(Canada) Chelsea Carey	83
(Northern Ontario) Krista McCarville	81
(Manitoba) Michelle Englot	80
(Alberta) Heather Nedohin	79

== Awards ==
The awards and all-star teams are as follows:

All-Star Teams

First Team

- Skip: Rachel Homan, Ontario
- Third: Emma Miskew, Ontario
- Second: Joanne Courtney, Ontario
- Lead: Blaine de Jager, British Columbia

Second Team

- Skip: Chelsea Carey, Team Canada
- Third: Shannon Aleksic, British Columbia
- Second: Sarah Wilkes, Alberta
- Lead: Lisa Weagle, Ontario

Marj Mitchell Sportsmanship Award

- Kerry Galusha, Northwest Territories

Joan Mead Builder Award

- Wendy Morgan, who is both Program Manager and team leader of the Canadian wheelchair curling program, helping the national team win three Paralympic gold medals.

== Provincial and territorial playdowns ==
- 2017 Alberta Scotties Tournament of Hearts
- 2017 British Columbia Scotties Tournament of Hearts
- 2017 Manitoba Scotties Tournament of Hearts
- 2017 New Brunswick Scotties Tournament of Hearts
- 2017 Newfoundland and Labrador Scotties Tournament of Hearts
- 2017 Northern Ontario Scotties Tournament of Hearts
- 2017 Nova Scotia Scotties Tournament of Hearts
- 2017 Ontario Scotties Tournament of Hearts
- 2017 Prince Edward Island Scotties Tournament of Hearts
- 2017 Quebec Scotties Tournament of Hearts
- 2017 Saskatchewan Scotties Tournament of Hearts
- 2017 Northwest Territories Scotties Tournament of Hearts
- 2017 Yukon Scotties Tournament of Hearts
- 2017 Nunavut Scotties Tournament of Hearts
