= 2018 Newfoundland and Labrador Scotties Tournament of Hearts =

- Host city: St. John's, Newfoundland and Labrador
- Arena: Re/Max Centre
- Dates: January 2–7
- Winner: Team Curtis
- Curling club: Re/Max Centre, St. John's
- Skip: Stacie Curtis
- Third: Erin Porter
- Second: Julie Devereaux
- Lead: Carrie Vautour
- Alternate: Erica Trickett
- Coach: Eugene Trickett
- Finalist: Heather Strong

The 2018 Newfoundland and Labrador Women's Curling Championship, the women's provincial curling championship for Newfoundland and Labrador, was held from January 2 to 7 at the Re/Max Centre in St. John's, Newfoundland and Labrador. The winning Stacie Curtis rink represented Newfoundland and Labrador at the 2018 Scotties Tournament of Hearts in Penticton, British Columbia.

== Teams ==
Teams are as follows:

Skip	Vice	Second	Lead	Alternate	Club
Stacie Curtis	Erin Porter	Julie Devereaux	Carrie Vautour	Erica Trickett	St. John's Curling Club, St. John's
Mackenzie Glynn	Katie Follett	Sarah Chaytor	Camille Burt		St. John's Curling Club, St. John's
Beth Hamilton	Sarah Hill	Heidi Trickett	Jeannette Piper		St. John's Curling Club, St. John's
Cindy Miller	Jessica Cunningham	Noelle Thomas-Kennell	Sarah Ford	Heather Croke	St. John's Curling Club, St. John's
Rebecca Roberts	Chantal Newell	Lauren Barron	Sydney Parsons		St. John's Curling Club, St. John's
Kelli Sharpe	Michelle Jewer	Stephanie Korab	Rhonda Whalen		St. John's Curling Club, St. John's
Heather Strong	Brooke Godsland	Sarah Day	Kate Cooper		St. John's Curling Club, St. John's

== Round robin standings ==
Key
Teams to Playoffs

Skip	W	L
Strong	6	0
Curtis	5	1
Glynn	4	2
Hamilton	3	3
Roberts	2	4
Sharpe	1	5
Miller	0	6

== Round robin results ==
=== January 2 ===
Draw 1

- Glynn 9-3 Miller
- Hamilton 6-3 Roberts
- Curtis 8-3 Sharpe

=== January 3 ===
Draw 2

- Hamilton 1-8 Strong
- Curtis 6-2 Miller
- Glynn 6-5 Roberts

Draw 3

- Curtis 7-5 Roberts
- Strong 6-3 Glynn
- Sharpe 8-4 Miller

=== January 4 ===
Draw 4

- Strong 7-5 Sharpe
- Roberts 7-2 Miller
- Hamilton 5-7 Curtis

Draw 5

- Hamilton 7-5 Miller
- Glynn 6-5 Sharpe
- Strong 7-6 Roberts

=== January 5 ===
Draw 6

- Sharpe 5-6 Roberts
- Curtis 6-7 Strong
- Hamilton 2-6 Glynn

Draw 7

- Curtis 9-2 Glynn
- Sharpe 4-5 Hamilton
- Strong 8-6 Miller

== Playoffs ==
Strong must be defeated twice.

Semifinal			Final
			1	Heather Strong	1	1
2	Stacie Curtis	7	2	Stacie Curtis	8	7
3	Mackenzie Glynn	0

=== Semifinal ===
January 6, 3:00pm

Sheet 4	1	2	3	4	5	6	7	8	9	10	Final
Stacie Curtis	0	2	2	2	1	X	X	X	X	X	7
Mackenzie Glynn	0	0	0	0	0	X	X	X	X	X	0

=== Final #1 ===
January 6, 8:00pm

Sheet 4	1	2	3	4	5	6	7	8	9	10	Final
Heather Strong	0	0	1	0	0	X	X	X	X	X	1
Stacie Curtis	3	0	0	3	2	X	X	X	X	X	8

=== Final #2 ===
January 7, 1:30pm

Sheet 4	1	2	3	4	5	6	7	8	9	10	Final
Heather Strong	0	0	0	0	1	0	0	0	0	X	1
Stacie Curtis	0	0	1	0	0	0	0	2	4	X	7

2018 Newfoundland and Labrador Tournament of Hearts

Stacie Curtis
5th Newfoundland and Labrador Provincial Championship title
