= 2024 Newfoundland and Labrador Scotties Tournament of Hearts =

- Host city: St. John's, Newfoundland and Labrador
- Arena: RE/MAX Centre
- Dates: January 25–28
- Winner: Team Curtis
- Curling club: RE/MAX Centre, St. John's
- Skip: Stacie Curtis
- Third: Erica Curtis
- Second: Julie Hynes
- Lead: Camille Burt
- Alternate: Jessica Wiseman
- Coach: Gene Trickett
- Finalist: Brooke Godsland

The 2024 Newfoundland and Labrador Scotties Tournament of Hearts, the women's provincial curling championship for Newfoundland and Labrador, was held from January 25 to 28 at the RE/MAX Centre in St. John's, Newfoundland and Labrador. The event was held in conjunction with the 2024 Newfoundland and Labrador Tankard, the provincial men's championship.

The winning Stacie Curtis rink represented Newfoundland and Labrador at the 2024 Scotties Tournament of Hearts in Calgary, Alberta where they finished seventh in Pool A with a 2–6 record. However, they did hand the first place team in Pool A, Alberta's Selena Sturmay their only loss in round robin play.

== Teams ==
The teams are listed as follows:

Skip	Third	Second	Lead	Alternate	Coach	Club
Sarah Boland	Kelli Sharpe	Beth Hamilton	Adrienne Mercer			RE/MAX Centre, St. John's
Stacie Curtis	Erica Curtis	Julie Hynes	Camille Burt	Jessica Wiseman	Gene Trickett	RE/MAX Centre, St. John's
Brooke Godsland	Erin Porter	Sarah McNeil Lamswood	Kate Paterson			RE/MAX Centre, St. John's
Hayley Gushue	Heather Martin	Sitaye Penney	Izzy Paterson			RE/MAX Centre, St. John's

== Round robin standings ==
Final Round Robin Standings

Key
Teams to Playoffs

Skip	W	L	PF	PA	EW	EL	BE	SE
Brooke Godsland	5	1	46	32	23	20	5	6
Stacie Curtis	3	3	47	36	27	23	1	11
Sarah Boland	3	3	37	42	20	26	1	4
Hayley Gushue	1	5	28	48	20	21	5	7

== Round robin results ==
All draw times are listed in Newfoundland Time (UTC−03:30).

=== Draw 1 ===
Thursday, January 25, 1:30 pm

Sheet 1	1	2	3	4	5	6	7	8	9	10	Final
Sarah Boland	0	2	0	2	0	0	3	0	0	0	7
Brooke Godsland	2	0	1	0	0	1	0	2	2	1	9

Sheet 2	1	2	3	4	5	6	7	8	9	10	Final
Stacie Curtis	0	0	0	2	0	4	2	0	1	1	10
Hayley Gushue	1	1	1	0	1	0	0	3	0	0	7

=== Draw 2 ===
Thursday, January 25, 7:00 pm

Sheet 1	1	2	3	4	5	6	7	8	9	10	Final
Sarah Boland	2	0	0	2	0	0	3	X	X	X	7
Hayley Gushue	0	0	0	0	0	1	0	X	X	X	1

Sheet 3	1	2	3	4	5	6	7	8	9	10	Final
Stacie Curtis	2	0	2	1	1	1	0	2	X	X	9
Brooke Godsland	0	1	0	0	0	0	1	0	X	X	2

=== Draw 3 ===
Friday, January 26, 1:30 pm

Sheet 2	1	2	3	4	5	6	7	8	9	10	Final
Brooke Godsland	0	0	2	0	4	0	2	X	X	X	8
Hayley Gushue	1	0	0	1	0	1	0	X	X	X	3

Sheet 3	1	2	3	4	5	6	7	8	9	10	11	Final
Sarah Boland	0	2	3	0	0	2	0	0	2	0	1	10
Stacie Curtis	1	0	0	1	1	0	3	1	0	2	0	9

=== Draw 4 ===
Friday, January 26, 7:00 pm

Sheet 1	1	2	3	4	5	6	7	8	9	10	Final
Stacie Curtis	1	0	0	2	0	0	2	2	0	0	7
Hayley Gushue	0	1	2	0	2	2	0	0	2	2	11

Sheet 2	1	2	3	4	5	6	7	8	9	10	Final
Sarah Boland	0	1	0	1	0	1	0	3	1	0	7
Brooke Godsland	2	0	5	0	1	0	1	0	0	2	11

=== Draw 5 ===
Saturday, January 27, 9:00 am

Sheet 1	1	2	3	4	5	6	7	8	9	10	Final
Stacie Curtis	0	0	3	0	0	0	0	0	0	1	4
Brooke Godsland	0	1	0	0	0	2	0	1	1	0	5

Sheet 3	1	2	3	4	5	6	7	8	9	10	Final
Sarah Boland	0	0	0	2	1	0	0	2	0	X	5
Hayley Gushue	0	0	1	0	0	1	1	0	1	X	4

=== Draw 6 ===
Saturday, January 27, 7:30 pm

Sheet 2	1	2	3	4	5	6	7	8	9	10	Final
Sarah Boland	0	0	0	1	0	0	X	X	X	X	1
Stacie Curtis	2	1	0	0	4	1	X	X	X	X	8

Sheet 3	1	2	3	4	5	6	7	8	9	10	Final
Brooke Godsland	3	0	4	4	X	X	X	X	X	X	11
Hayley Gushue	0	2	0	0	X	X	X	X	X	X	2

== Playoffs ==
Semifinal			Final
			1	Brooke Godsland	5
2	Stacie Curtis	5	2	Stacie Curtis	13
3	Sarah Boland	4

=== Semifinal ===
Sunday, January 28, 9:00 am

Sheet 2	1	2	3	4	5	6	7	8	9	10	Final
Stacie Curtis	0	1	1	1	0	1	0	0	0	1	5
Sarah Boland	0	0	0	0	1	0	1	1	1	0	4

=== Final ===
Sunday, January 28, 2:30 pm

Sheet 3	1	2	3	4	5	6	7	8	9	10	Final
Brooke Godsland	1	0	0	2	0	2	0	0	X	X	5
Stacie Curtis	0	3	2	0	2	0	2	4	X	X	13

2024 Newfoundland and Labrador Scotties Tournament of Hearts

Stacie Curtis
7th Newfoundland and Labrador Provincial Championship title
