= 2009 Newfoundland and Labrador Scotties Tournament of Hearts =

- Host city: St. John's, Newfoundland and Labrador
- Arena: Bally Haly G&CC
- Dates: January 21–25, 2009
- Winner: Team Strong
- Curling club: ReMax Centre, St. John's
- Skip: Heather Strong
- Third: Cathy Cunningham
- Second: Laura Strong
- Lead: Peg Goss
- Finalist: Michelle Jewer

The 2009 Newfoundland and Labrador Scotties Tournament of Hearts, Newfoundland and Labrador's women's provincial curling championship, was held January 21–25 at the Bally Haly Golf and Curling Club in St. John's. The winning Heather Strong team represented Newfoundland and Labrador at the 2009 Scotties Tournament of Hearts in Victoria, British Columbia.

== Teams ==
Skip	Third	Second	Lead	Club
Stacie Devereaux	Stephanie Guzzwell	Sarah Paul	Julie Devereaux	Bally Haly Golf and Curling Club, St. John's
Susan Hannan	Beth Cody	Amy MacIntyre	Lacey Seamone	ReMax Centre, St. John's
Michelle Jewer	Kellie Turpin	Jill Waite	Leslie Anne Walsh	ReMax Centre, St. John's
Cindy Miller	Beth Hamilton	Adrienne Mercer	Noelle Thomas	Bally Haly Golf and Curling Club, St. John's
Shelley Nichols	Steph LeDrew	Rhonda Rogers	Colette Lemon	ReMax Centre, St. John's
Barb Pinsent	Marian Dawe	Dianne Ryan	Jeanette Hodder	ReMax Centre, St. John's
Heather Strong	Cathy Cunningham	Laura Strong	Peg Goss	ReMax Centre, St. John's

== Standings ==
Team	W	L
Strong	6	0
Jewer	4	2
Pinsent	3	3
Hannan	2	4
Devereaux	2	4
Nichols	2	4
Miller	2	4

== Results ==
=== January 21 ===
- Strong 6-3 Hannan
- Jewer 10-9 Devereaux
- Nichols 8-2 Pinsent
- Jewer 8-2 Miller
- Strong 7-6 Nichols
- Pinsent 7-4 Devereaux

=== January 22 ===
- Devereaux 6-4 Nichols
- Miller 6-5 Hannan
- Strong 7-3 Pinsent
- Pinsent 9-1 Jewer
- Devereaux 5-3 Miller
- Hannan 10-9 Nichols

=== January 23 ===
- Miller 8-3 Pinsent
- Jewer 8-6 Hannan
- Strong 9-5 Devereaux
- Strong 7-6 Miller
- Jewer 5-4 Nichols
- Pinsent 6-3 Hannan

=== January 24 ===
- Hannan 7-6 Devereaux
- Strong 9-4 Jewer
- Nichols 10-3 Miller

== Playoffs ==
Semi-final, January 24; Final(s) on January 25

Semifinal			Final
			1	Heather Strong	8
2	Michelle Jewer	9	2	Michelle Jewer	6
3	Barb Pinsent	3

Strong must be beaten twice.

=== Semi-final ===
Sheet 3	1	2	3	4	5	6	7	8	9	10	Final
Barb Pinsent	1	0	0	0	1	0	1	0	0	X	3
Michelle Jewer	0	2	1	1	0	2	0	1	2	X	9

=== Final ===
Sheet 2	1	2	3	4	5	6	7	8	9	10	Final
Michelle Jewer	0	0	0	2	1	0	1	0	2	0	6
Heather Strong	1	1	2	0	0	2	0	1	0	1	8
