= 2017 Newfoundland and Labrador Scotties Tournament of Hearts =

- Host city: St. John's, Newfoundland and Labrador
- Arena: Bally Haly Golf & Curling Club
- Dates: January 26–29
- Winner: Stacie Curtis
- Curling club: St. John's Curling Club, St. John's
- Skip: Stacie Curtis
- Third: Erin Porter
- Second: Julie Devereaux
- Lead: Erica Trickett
- Finalist: Shelley Hardy

The 2017 Newfoundland and Labrador Women's Curling Championship, the women's provincial curling championship for Newfoundland and Labrador, was held from January 26 to 29 at the Bally Haly Golf & Curling Club in St. John's, Newfoundland and Labrador. The winning Stacie Curtis rink represented Newfoundland and Labrador at the 2017 Scotties Tournament of Hearts from the Meridian Centre in St. Catharines.

The event was held in conjunction with the 2017 Newfoundland and Labrador Tankard, the men's provincial championship which was held at the same time.

Stacie Curtis won her fourth provincial championship, after defeating another former provincial champion, Shelley Hardy in the final.

== Teams ==
Teams are as follows:

Skip	Vice	Second	Lead	Club
Stacie Curtis	Erin Porter	Julie Devereaux	Erica Trickett	St. John's Curling Club, St. John's
Beth Hamilton	Adrienne Mercer	Ashley Rumboldt	Heidi Trickett	St. John's Curling Club, St. John's
Shelley Hardy	Michelle Jewer	Kelli Turpin	Rhonda Whalen	St. John's Curling Club, St. John's
Cindy Miller	Jessica Cunningham	Noelle Thomas-Kennell	Courtney Barnhill	St. John's Curling Club, St. John's
Heather Strong	Stephanie Guzzwell	Sarah Day	Kathryn Cooper	St. John's Curling Club, St. John's

== Round robin standings ==
Key
Teams to Final

Skip	W	L
Curtis	3	1
Hardy	3	1
Strong	2	2
Miller	1	3
Hamilton	1	3

== Round robin results ==
"x" indicates team with the hammer in the first end.

=== January 26 ===
Draw 1

- Strong 7-5x Curtis
- Hamilton 7x-10 Hardy

Draw 2

- Strong 10x-4 Miller (9 ends)
- Curtis 9x-5 Hamilton

=== January 27 ===
Draw 3

- Hamilton 3-8x Miller (6 ends)
- Curtis 8-5x Hardy

Draw 4

- Strong 4x-7 Hamilton
- Miller 4x-10 Hardy (8 ends)

=== January 28 ===
Draw 5

- Strong 2x-9 Hardy (6 ends)
- Curtis 8x-2 Miller (5 ends)

== Final ==
Saturday, January 28, 2:30p NST

Team	1	2	3	4	5	6	7	8	9	10	Final
Stacie Curtis	3	1	0	1	1	0	1	1	0	X	8
Shelley Hardy	0	0	1	0	0	2	0	0	1	X	4

2017 Newfoundland and Labrador Tournament of Hearts

Stacie Curtis
4th Newfoundland and Labrador Provincial Championship title
