= 2018 Prince Edward Island Scotties Tournament of Hearts =

2018 Prince Edward Island Scotties
- Host city: Cornwall, Prince Edward Island
- Arena: Cornwall Curling Club
- Dates: January 4–9
- Winner: Robyn MacPhee
- Curling club: Charlottetown Curling Complex
- Skip: Robyn MacPhee
- Third: Sarah Fullerton
- Second: Meaghan Hughes
- Lead: Michelle McQuaid
- Coach: Mitch O'Shea
- Finalist: Lauren Lenentine

The 2018 Prince Edward Island Scotties Tournament of Hearts, the provincial women's curling championship for Prince Edward Island, was held January 4–9 at the Cornwall Curling Club in Cornwall, Prince Edward Island. The winning Robyn MacPhee team represented Prince Edward Island at the 2018 Scotties Tournament of Hearts.

== Teams Entered ==
The Robyn MacPhee rink are the defending champions.

Skip	Third	Second	Lead	Alternate	Club(s)
Tammy Dewar	Darlene MacLeod-London	Robyn MacDonald	Gail Greene		Montague Curling Club, Montague
Lisa Jackson	Carolyn Coulson	Melissa Morrow	Jodi Murphy	Aleya Quilty	Charlottetown Curling Club, Charlottetown
Lauren Lenentine	Kristie Rogers	Breanne Burgoyne	Rachel O'Connor		Cornwall Curling Club, Cornwall
Robyn MacPhee	Sarah Fullerton	Meaghan Hughes	Michelle McQuaid		Charlottetown Curling Complex, Charlottetown
Veronica Smith	Jane DiCarlo	Sabrina Smith	Whitney Young		Cornwall Curling Club, Cornwall

== Knockout draw brackets ==
=== A Event ===
A Event		Semifinals		A Final
		Lisa Jackson	5
Tammy Dewar	5	Lauren Lenentine	8
Lauren Lenentine	8			Lauren Lenentine	11
				Veronica Smith	2
		Robyn MacPhee	0
		Veronica Smith	9

=== B Event ===
B Event		Quarterfinals		Semifinals		B Final
				Robyn MacPhee	5
Robyn MacPhee	7			Veronica Smith	3
Tammy Dewar	3	Robyn MacPhee	13
		Lisa Jackson	4
						Robyn MacPhee	10
						Lauren Lenentine	7

=== C Event ===
C Event		Quarterfinals		Semifinals		C Final
				Lauren Lenentine	6
Tammy Dewar	7			Veronica Smith	7
Lisa Jackson	10	Lisa Jackson	2
		Veronica Smith	6
						Veronica Smith	5
						Robyn MacPhee	8

== Playoffs ==
Game 2 was not needed as Team MacPhee needed to be beaten twice.

Semifinal			Final
			B	Robyn MacPhee
A	Lauren Lenentine	2	C	Robyn MacPhee
C	Robyn MacPhee	6

=== Semifinal ===
Sunday, January 7, 1:00 pm

Sheet 3	1	2	3	4	5	6	7	8	9	10	Final
Robyn MacPhee 🔨	1	0	0	0	2	1	0	1	1	X	6
Lauren Lenentine	0	0	0	1	0	0	1	0	0	X	2

2018 Prince Edward Island Scotties Tournament of Hearts

Robyn MacPhee
9th Prince Edward Island Provincial Championship title
