= Sarah Boland =

Canadian curler (born 1995)

- Curler
- Born: Sarah Hill; December 23, 1995 (age 30); St. John's, Newfoundland and Labrador

Team
- Curling club: RE/MAX Centre, St. John's, NL
- Skip: Sarah Boland
- Third: Kelli Sharpe
- Second: Beth Hamilton
- Lead: Adrienne Mercer
- Alternate: Laura Strong

Curling career
- Member Association: Newfoundland and Labrador
- Hearts: 2 (2021, 2022)
- Top CTRS ranking: 66th (2021–22)

Sarah Boland (born December 23, 1995 as Sarah Hill) is a Canadian curler from St. John's, Newfoundland and Labrador. She currently skips her own team out of the RE/MAX Centre in St. John's. She is a two-time Newfoundland and Labrador junior champion.

== Career ==
Boland skipped Newfoundland and Labrador at two consecutive Canadian Junior Curling Championships in 2014 and 2015. In 2014, she skipped her team to a 3–6 twelfth place finish and in 2015 her team finished 2–7 with victories over the Northwest Territories and Nunavut.

Boland competed in the 2017 Canadian Mixed Curling Championship playing third for her husband Adam Boland with Zach Young at second and Brooke Godsland at lead. After finishing 3–3 in the round robin, the team went 1–3 in the championship pool, ultimately finishing in sixth place with a 4–6 record.

Due to the COVID-19 pandemic in Newfoundland and Labrador, many teams had to opt out of the 2021 Newfoundland and Labrador Scotties Tournament of Hearts as they could not commit to the quarantine process in order to compete in the 2021 Scotties Tournament of Hearts. This meant that only Boland's rink and her clubmate Mackenzie Mitchell's rink entered the event. In the best-of-five series, Team Hill defeated Team Mitchell three games to one to earn the right to represent Newfoundland and Labrador at the 2021 Scotties in Calgary, Alberta. At the Tournament of Hearts, Boland led her team of Beth Hamilton, Lauren Barron and Adrienne Mercer to a 2–6 round robin record, with wins against New Brunswick's Melissa Adams and Nunavut's Lori Eddy.

The following season, the provincial championship was cancelled due to the pandemic. As the highest ranked team on the CTRS standings, Team Hill were appointed to represent Newfoundland and Labrador at the 2022 Scotties Tournament of Hearts in Thunder Bay, Ontario. The team once again finished the national championship with a 2–6 record, beating Nunavut's Brigitte MacPhail and upsetting Northern Ontario's Krista McCarville in their two victories.

== Personal life ==
Boland was a business student at the Memorial University of Newfoundland. She is currently an air traffic control trainee at NAV Canada. She is married to fellow curler Adam Boland.

== Teams ==
Season	Skip	Third	Second	Lead
2012–13	Sarah Hill	Danielle Wiseman	Sarah Ford	Heidi Trickett
2013–14	Sarah Hill	Danielle Wiseman	Sarah Ford	Heidi Trickett
2014–15	Sarah Hill	Danielle Wiseman	Sarah Ford	Heidi Trickett
2015–16	Sarah Hill	Danielle Wiseman	Sarah Ford	Heidi Trickett
2017–18	Beth Hamilton	Sarah Hill	Heidi Trickett	Jeannette Piper
2018–19	Sarah Hill	Lauren Barron	Sydney Parsons	Heidi Trickett
2020–21	Sarah Hill	Beth Hamilton	Lauren Barron	Adrienne Mercer
2021–22	Sarah Hill	Kelli Sharpe	Beth Hamilton	Adrienne Mercer
2022–23	Sarah Hill	Kelli Sharpe	Beth Hamilton	Adrienne Mercer
2023–24	Sarah Boland	Kelli Sharpe	Beth Hamilton	Adrienne Mercer
2024–25	Sarah Boland	Kelli Sharpe	Beth Hamilton	Adrienne Mercer
