= 2021 Newfoundland and Labrador Scotties Tournament of Hearts =

Women's provincial curling championship

- Host city: St. John's, Newfoundland and Labrador
- Arena: RE/MAX Centre
- Dates: January 29–30
- Winner: Team Hill
- Curling club: RE/MAX Centre, St. John's
- Skip: Sarah Hill
- Third: Beth Hamilton
- Second: Lauren Barron
- Lead: Adrienne Mercer
- Finalist: Mackenzie Mitchell

The 2021 Newfoundland and Labrador Scotties Tournament of Hearts, the women's provincial curling championship for Newfoundland and Labrador, was held from January 29 to 30 at the RE/MAX Centre in St. John's, Newfoundland and Labrador. The winning Sarah Hill rink represented Newfoundland and Labrador at the 2021 Scotties Tournament of Hearts in Calgary, Alberta, and finished with a 2–6 record. The event was held in conjunction with the 2021 Newfoundland and Labrador Tankard, the provincial men's championship.

Due to the COVID-19 pandemic in Newfoundland and Labrador, many teams could not commit to the quarantine process in order to compete at the national championship. Clubmates Sarah Hill and Mackenzie Mitchell were the only two teams to enter the event. Team Hill won the best of five series three games to one.

== Teams ==
The teams are listed as follows:

Skip	Third	Second	Lead	Club
Sarah Hill	Beth Hamilton	Lauren Barron	Adrienne Mercer	RE/MAX Centre, St. John's
Mackenzie Mitchell	Katie Follett	Sarah Chaytor	Claire Hartlen	RE/MAX Centre, St. John's

== Results ==
All draw times are listed in Newfoundland Time (UTC−03:30).

=== Standings ===
Final Standings

Skip	W	L	PF	PA	EW	EL	BE	SE
Sarah Hill	3	1	30	21	17	17	2	3
Mackenzie Mitchell	1	3	21	30	17	17	2	5

=== Draw 1 ===
Friday, January 29, 2:30 pm

Sheet 2	1	2	3	4	5	6	7	8	9	10	Final
Sarah Hill	0	3	0	1	0	0	0	1	0	X	5
Mackenzie Mitchell	1	0	3	0	1	1	0	0	1	X	7

=== Draw 2 ===
Friday, January 29, 7:30 pm

Sheet 1	1	2	3	4	5	6	7	8	9	10	Final
Mackenzie Mitchell	0	1	0	1	1	0	1	0	X	X	4
Sarah Hill	3	0	1	0	0	2	0	2	X	X	8

=== Draw 3 ===
Saturday, January 30, 9:30 am

Sheet 2	1	2	3	4	5	6	7	8	9	10	Final
Mackenzie Mitchell	1	0	0	1	1	0	1	0	0	X	4
Sarah Hill	0	3	1	0	0	4	0	1	1	X	10

=== Draw 4 ===
Saturday, January 30, 7:30 pm

Sheet 1	1	2	3	4	5	6	7	8	9	10	11	Final
Sarah Hill	1	0	0	1	1	0	3	0	0	0	1	7
Mackenzie Mitchell	0	2	0	0	0	2	0	0	1	1	0	6

2021 Newfoundland and Labrador Scotties Tournament of Hearts

Sarah Hill
1st Newfoundland and Labrador Provincial Championship title
