= Lauren Barron =

Canadian curler

- Curler
- Born: October 17, 1997 (age 29); Mount Pearl, Newfoundland and Labrador

Team
- Curling club: RE/MAX Centre, St. John's, NL

Curling career
- Member Association: Newfoundland and Labrador
- Hearts: 1 (2021)

Lauren Barron (born October 17, 1997, in Mount Pearl) is a Canadian curler from St. John's, Newfoundland and Labrador.

== Career ==
During her junior career, Barron played second for Rebecca Roberts with Chantal Newell at third and Sydney Parsons at lead. The team represented the Memorial University of Newfoundland at the 2018 U Sports/Curling Canada University Curling Championships where they finished with a 1–6 record. Also in juniors, Barron represented Newfoundland and Labrador at the 2015 Canada Winter Games with skip Megan Kearley, finishing in twelfth with a 2–5 record. Out of juniors, Barron joined Team Sarah Hill.

Due to the COVID-19 pandemic in Newfoundland and Labrador, many teams had to opt out of the 2021 Newfoundland and Labrador Scotties Tournament of Hearts as they could not commit to the quarantine process in order to compete in the 2021 Scotties Tournament of Hearts. This meant that only Team Hill and their clubmates Mackenzie Mitchell's rink entered the event. In the best-of-five series, Team Hill defeated Team Mitchell three games to one to earn the right to represent Newfoundland and Labrador at the 2021 Scotties in Calgary, Alberta. At the Tournament of Hearts, they finished with a 2–6 round robin record, with wins against New Brunswick's Melissa Adams and Nunavut's Lori Eddy.

== Personal life ==
Barron is currently an earth science student at the Memorial University of Newfoundland. She is in a relationship with Kevin Girouard.

== Teams ==
Season	Skip	Third	Second	Lead
2012–13	Rebecca Roberts	Chantal Newell	Lauren Barron	Sydney Parsons
2013–14	Rebecca Roberts	Chantal Newell	Lauren Barron	Sydney Parsons
2014–15	Megan Kearley	Chantal Newell	Lauren Barron	Sydney Parsons
2015–16	Rebecca Roberts	Chantal Newell	Lauren Barron	Sydney Parsons
2016–17	Rebecca Roberts	Chantal Newell	Lauren Barron	Sydney Parsons
2017–18	Rebecca Roberts	Chantal Newell	Lauren Barron	Sydney Parsons
2018–19	Sarah Hill	Lauren Barron	Sydney Parsons	Heidi Trickett
2019–20	Kelli Sharpe	Brooke Godsland	Lauren Barron	Michelle Jewer
2020–21	Sarah Hill	Beth Hamilton	Lauren Barron	Adrienne Mercer
