= Janice Fitzgerald =

Canadian public health physician

Janice Fitzgerald ONL

Chief Medical Officer of Health for Newfoundland and Labrador
- Incumbent
- Assumed office September 2019

Personal details
- Born: Grand Falls Windsor, Newfoundland and Labrador, Canada
- Education: Memorial University of Newfoundland, Dalhousie University

Janice Fitzgerald ONL is a Canadian family physician. Since September 2019, she currently serves as Newfoundland and Labrador's Chief Medical Officer of Health, and has provided public health guidance to lead the province during the COVID-19 pandemic in Newfoundland and Labrador.

== Early life and education ==
Fitzgerald was born in Trinity, Newfoundland and Labrador. She completed a Bachelor of Science degree in 1990, medical school in 1994, and a Master's in Public Health (MPH) in 2016, all from Memorial University of Newfoundland.

== Career ==
Fitzgerald completed her medical residency at Dalhousie University in Halifax, before moving back to work as a family physician in Springdale from 1996 to 1998, then in emergency medicine in Grand Falls-Windsor, and family medicine in the St. John's area in 2000. In 2017, Fitzgerald worked in public health policy development at the provincial Department of Health and Community Services, where she was the Clinical Chief, Long Term Care for the Eastern Regional Health Authority. In September 2019, Fitzgerald assumed the role as Newfoundland and Labrador's Chief Medical Officer Of Health on an interim basis, before taking on the role permanently a year later.

Fitzgerald has spoken about different aspects of the COVID-19 pandemic, including the COVID-19 vaccines, preparations for vaccine delivery and the subsequent roll-out in Newfoundland and Labrador, and public health practices.

=== Public support and awards ===
Polls from Narrative Research have consistently found Fitzgerald to have a higher public approval rating than her counterparts in other provinces.

In recognition of her public health guidance amid the pandemic, Fitzgerald was awarded a YWCA St. John's Honorary Woman of Distinction Award (2020), and recognized as a College of Family Physicians of Canada's Family Physician of the Year for Newfoundland and Labrador (2020). She has received multiple tributes, including cookies, cross-stitch and petitions to name university buildings after her.

On July 22, 2022, the Government of Newfoundland and Labrador announced that Dr. Fitzgerald would be Invested into the Order of Newfoundland and Labrador for her outstanding work in health care during the COVID-19 pandemic. The ceremony, held at the Government House (Newfoundland and Labrador), took place on September 28, 2022.

== Personal ==
She lives with her husband and their two dogs in Mount Pearl, and has three children pursuing post-secondary education.
