= 2021 Scotties Tournament of Hearts =

Canada's national women's curling championship

- Host city: Calgary, Alberta
- Arena: Markin MacPhail Centre, Canada Olympic Park
- Dates: February 19–28
- Attendance: 0 (behind closed doors)
- Winner: Canada
- Curling club: Gimli CC, Gimli, Manitoba
- Skip: Kerri Einarson
- Third: Val Sweeting
- Second: Shannon Birchard
- Lead: Briane Meilleur
- Alternate: Krysten Karwacki
- Coach: Heather Nedohin
- Finalist: Ontario (Rachel Homan)

The 2021 Scotties Tournament of Hearts, Canada's national women's curling championship, was held from February 19 to 28 at the Markin MacPhail Centre at Canada Olympic Park in Calgary, Alberta. The winning Kerri Einarson team represented Canada at the 2021 World Women's Curling Championship. The world championship was supposed to be held at the Curlinghalle Schaffhausen in Schaffhausen, Switzerland; however, the event was cancelled and rescheduled to the "Calgary bubble" of the Markin MacPhail Centre.

The event was originally scheduled to be held in Thunder Bay, Ontario. Due to the COVID-19 pandemic in Canada, it was announced that most Curling Canada championships still being held in the 2020–21 curling season would be moved to a centralized "bubble" (similar to that of the NHL as in Edmonton) at Canada Olympic Park. All events were held behind closed doors with no spectators permitted. In addition, due to COVID-19 restrictions and logistics, most provincial playdowns were cancelled, with teams being selected by their respective member associations.

== Teams ==
Canada	Alberta	British Columbia
Gimli CC, Gimli Skip: Kerri Einarson; Third: Val Sweeting; Second: Shannon Birchard (Note: Team Canada's alternate Krysten Karwacki threw second stones for the last end of Draw 7.); Lead: Briane Meilleur; Alternate: Krysten Karwacki	Saville SC, Edmonton Skip: Laura Walker; Third: Kate Cameron; Second: Taylor McDonald; Lead: Rachelle Brown (Note: Team Alberta's alternate Dana Ferguson threw lead stones for the last end of Draw 5 and the last three ends of Draw 17.); Alternate: Dana Ferguson	McArthur Island CC, Kamloops Skip: Corryn Brown; Third: Erin Pincott; Second: Dezaray Hawes; Lead: Samantha Fisher; Alternate: Stephanie Jackson-Baier
Manitoba	New Brunswick	Newfoundland and Labrador
St. Vital CC, Winnipeg Skip: Jennifer Jones; Third: Kaitlyn Lawes; Second: Jocelyn Peterman; Lead: Lisa Weagle (Note: Team Manitoba's alternate Raunora Westcott threw lead stones for the last end of Draw 14 and the last three ends of Draw 16.); Alternate: Raunora Westcott	Capital WC, Fredericton Skip: Melissa Adams; Third: Jaclyn Tingley; Second: Nicole Arsenault Bishop; Lead: Kendra Lister; Alternate: Monique Massé	St. John's CC, St. John's Skip: Sarah Hill; Third: Beth Hamilton; Second: Lauren Barron (Note: Team Newfoundland and Labrador's alternate Brooke Godsland threw second stones for the last three ends of Draw 16.); Lead: Adrienne Mercer; Alternate: Brooke Godsland
Northern Ontario	Nova Scotia	Ontario
Idylwylde G&CC, Sudbury Skip: Krysta Burns; Third: Megan Smith (Note: Team Northern Ontario's alternate Kira Brunton threw lead stones for the last two ends of Draw 7, third stones for the last end of Draw 13 and lead stones for the entire game during Draw 17.); Second: Sara Guy; Lead: Amanda Gates; Alternate: Kira Brunton	Mayflower CC, Halifax Skip: Jill Brothers; Third: Erin Carmody; Second: Jenn Brine (Note: For the last end of Draw 15, Nova Scotia's alternate Kim Kelly threw second stones, Jenn Brine threw lead stones and Emma Logan sat out.); Lead: Emma Logan; Alternate: Kim Kelly	Ottawa CC, Ottawa Skip: Rachel Homan; Third: Emma Miskew; Second: Sarah Wilkes; Lead: Joanne Courtney (Note: Team Ontario's alternate Danielle Inglis threw lead stones for the last ends of Draws 5 and 21.); Alternate: Danielle Inglis
Prince Edward Island	Quebec	Saskatchewan
Montague CC, Montague & Cornwall CC, Cornwall Skip: Suzanne Birt; Third: Marie Christianson; Second: Meaghan Hughes; Lead: Michelle McQuaid; Alternate: Kathy O'Rourke	CC Laval-sur-le-Lac, Laval & Glenmore CC, Dollard-des-Ormeaux Skip: Laurie St-Georges; Third: Hailey Armstrong; Second: Emily Riley; Lead: Cynthia St-Georges (Note: Team Quebec's alternate Florence Boivin threw lead stones for the last seven ends of Draw 10.); Alternate: Florence Boivin	Nutana CC, Saskatoon Skip: Sherry Anderson (Note: Team Saskatchewan's alternate Amber Holland skipped the team during Draw 20, as Anderson sustained a hip and leg injury prior to the game.); Third: Nancy Martin; Second: Chaelynn Kitz; Lead: Breanne Knapp; Alternate: Amber Holland
Northwest Territories	Nunavut	Yukon
Yellowknife CC, Yellowknife Skip: Kerry Galusha; Third: Jo-Ann Rizzo; Second: Margot Flemming; Lead: Shona Barbour	Iqaluit CC, Iqaluit Skip: Lori Eddy (Note: In the eighth end of Draw 12, Nunavut's Sadie Pinksen only threw one stone during her third rocks, with Lori Eddy accidentally throwing the second. Due to this, Pinksen had to throw the last stone of the eighth and ninth ends to make up for her missed shot.); Third: Sadie Pinksen (Note: Nunavut's Sadie Pinksen and Alison Griffin swapped positions during Draw 2. Griffin threw third rocks while Pinksen threw second.); Second: Alison Griffin; Lead: Kaitlin MacDonald	Whitehorse CC, Whitehorse Skip: Laura Eby; Third: Lorna Spenner; Second: Tamar Vandenberghe; Lead: Laura Williamson (Note: Team Yukon's alternate Darlene Gammel threw lead stones for the first five ends of Draw 17. Regular lead Laura Williamson than threw lead stones for the remaining three ends.); Alternate: Darlene Gammel
(Manitoba) Wild Card #1	(Manitoba) Wild Card #2	(Manitoba) Wild Card #3
East St. Paul CC, East St. Paul Skip: Chelsea Carey (Note: Chelsea Carey is skipping the Tracy Fleury rink, as Fleury has decided to stay home due to family commitments and the ongoing COVID-19 pandemic in Canada.); Third: Selena Njegovan; Second: Liz Fyfe; Lead: Kristin MacCuish (Note: Team Wild Card #1's alternate Clancy Grandy threw lead stones for the last end of Draw 16.); Alternate: Clancy Grandy	Altona CC, Altona Skip: Mackenzie Zacharias; Third: Karlee Burgess; Second: Emily Zacharias; Lead: Lauren Lenentine (Note: Team Wild Card #2's alternate Rachel Erickson threw lead stones for the last end of Draw 7.); Alternate: Rachel Erickson	Assiniboine Memorial CC, Winnipeg Skip: Beth Peterson; Third: Jenna Loder; Second: Katherine Doerksen; Lead: Brittany Tran; Alternate: Cathy Overton-Clapham

=== CTRS ranking ===
As of the 2019–20 season, where at least three out of four players remained on the same team for the 2020–21 season.

Member Association (Skip)	Rank	Points
Canada (Einarson)	1	420.069
(Manitoba) Wild Card #1 (Fleury)	2	404.325
Manitoba (Jones)	3	341.765
Ontario (Homan)	4	325.931
Alberta (Walker)	7	172.405
British Columbia (Brown)	8	168.227
Prince Edward Island (Birt)	9	144.430
(Manitoba) Wild Card #2 (Zacharias)	11	134.874
(Manitoba) Wild Card #3 (Peterson)	12	134.291
Saskatchewan (Anderson)	14	122.015
Quebec (St-Georges)	28	81.176
Northwest Territories (Galusha)	31	76.500
Nova Scotia (Brothers)	33	66.155
New Brunswick (Adams)	50	46.066
Nunavut (Eddy)	100	9.051
Northern Ontario (Burns)	112	5.517
Newfoundland and Labrador (Hill)	NR	0.000
Yukon (Eby)	NR	0.000

== Wild card selection ==
In previous years, a wild card game was played between the top two teams on the Canadian Team Ranking System standings who did not win their provincial championship; the winner of this game was usually granted the final spot in the tournament. However, with many provinces cancelling their provincial championships due to the ongoing COVID-19 pandemic in Canada, thus not allowing many teams to compete for a chance to play at the Scotties, Curling Canada opted to include three wild card teams instead of the usual one. These teams directly qualified and did not participate in a play-in game.

For selection, teams must have 3 of 4 returning players from the previous season.

CTRS standings for wild card selection
Rank	Team	Member Association	Eligibility
1	~~Kerri Einarson~~	Manitoba	Scotties returning champion
2	Tracy Fleury	Manitoba	Was not named provincial representative
3	~~Jennifer Jones~~	Manitoba	Named provincial representative
4	~~Rachel Homan~~	Ontario	Named provincial representative
5	~~Chelsea Carey~~	Alberta	Team disbanded
6	~~Kelsey Rocque~~	Alberta	Team disbanded
7	~~Laura Walker~~	Alberta	Named provincial representative
8	~~Corryn Brown~~	British Columbia	Named provincial representative
9	~~Suzanne Birt~~	Prince Edward Island	Won provincials
10	~~Robyn Silvernagle~~	Saskatchewan	Team disbanded
11	Mackenzie Zacharias	Manitoba	Was not named provincial representative
12	Beth Peterson	Manitoba	Was not named provincial representative

== Map of teams ==
Team Canada Provincial Winners Wild-Card Teams

== Round robin standings ==
Final Round Robin Standings

Key
Teams to Championship pool

Pool A	Skip	W	L	PF	PA	EW	EL	BE	SE	S%
Ontario	Rachel Homan	7	1	61	35	39	28	1	11	80%
Canada	Kerri Einarson	7	1	64	35	36	30	3	11	80%
(Manitoba) Wild Card #3	Beth Peterson	5	3	52	46	33	33	2	9	74%
Alberta	Laura Walker	5	3	60	36	35	29	5	12	77%
Northwest Territories	Kerry Galusha	4	4	54	50	33	34	5	8	73%
(Manitoba) Wild Card #2	Mackenzie Zacharias	3	5	53	45	35	33	3	9	74%
Nova Scotia	Jill Brothers	3	5	50	53	32	34	3	8	71%
Northern Ontario	Krysta Burns	2	6	37	74	27	40	2	5	64%
Yukon	Laura Eby	0	8	29	86	26	35	4	6	58%

Pool B	Skip	W	L	PF	PA	EW	EL	BE	SE	S%
Saskatchewan	Sherry Anderson	6	2	60	44	36	32	5	10	76%
Manitoba	Jennifer Jones	6	2	64	39	37	30	3	12	83%
Quebec	Laurie St-Georges	6	2	60	50	33	31	6	7	74%
(Manitoba) Wild Card #1	Chelsea Carey	5	3	64	38	37	27	6	12	81%
British Columbia	Corryn Brown	4	4	59	53	38	31	1	14	78%
Prince Edward Island	Suzanne Birt	4	4	63	62	32	33	5	8	76%
New Brunswick	Melissa Adams	3	5	48	69	33	35	3	11	68%
Newfoundland and Labrador	Sarah Hill	2	6	40	67	27	40	0	6	68%
Nunavut	Lori Eddy	0	8	35	71	24	38	3	4	66%

== Round robin results ==
All draw times are listed in Mountain Standard Time (UTC−07:00).

=== Draw 1 ===
Friday, February 19, 6:30 pm

Sheet A	1	2	3	4	5	6	7	8	9	10	Final
Northern Ontario (Burns) 🔨	1	0	1	0	1	0	2	2	0	1	8
Northwest Territories (Galusha)	0	1	0	4	0	1	0	0	1	0	7

Sheet B	1	2	3	4	5	6	7	8	9	10	Final
Yukon (Eby)	0	0	1	0	0	0	1	0	0	X	2
(Manitoba) Wild Card #3 (Peterson) 🔨	1	0	0	3	1	0	0	1	4	X	10

Sheet C	1	2	3	4	5	6	7	8	9	10	Final
Alberta (Walker) 🔨	1	0	4	0	2	1	2	0	X	X	10
Nova Scotia (Brothers)	0	1	0	3	0	0	0	1	X	X	5

Sheet D	1	2	3	4	5	6	7	8	9	10	Final
Canada (Einarson) 🔨	1	1	0	3	0	1	1	0	X	X	7
(Manitoba) Wild Card #2 (Zacharias)	0	0	1	0	1	0	0	1	X	X	3

=== Draw 2 ===
Saturday, February 20, 8:30 am

Sheet A	1	2	3	4	5	6	7	8	9	10	Final
Newfoundland and Labrador (Hill) 🔨	0	2	0	3	0	3	0	0	0	0	8
New Brunswick (Adams)	1	0	2	0	0	0	1	1	1	1	7

Sheet B	1	2	3	4	5	6	7	8	9	10	Final
Manitoba (Jones) 🔨	0	2	0	0	2	0	2	1	0	X	7
Quebec (St-Georges)	0	0	0	2	0	1	0	0	1	X	4

Sheet C	1	2	3	4	5	6	7	8	9	10	Final
Nunavut (Eddy)	0	0	1	0	1	0	1	0	0	X	3
(Manitoba) Wild Card #1 (Fleury) 🔨	0	2	0	0	0	2	0	2	0	X	6

Sheet D	1	2	3	4	5	6	7	8	9	10	Final
Prince Edward Island (Birt)	0	0	1	0	1	2	0	0	2	1	7
Saskatchewan (Anderson) 🔨	2	1	0	2	0	0	0	1	0	0	6

=== Draw 3 ===
Saturday, February 20, 1:30 pm

Sheet A	1	2	3	4	5	6	7	8	9	10	Final
Yukon (Eby)	0	1	1	0	1	0	0	1	X	X	4
Nova Scotia (Brothers) 🔨	3	0	0	4	0	1	5	0	X	X	13

Sheet B	1	2	3	4	5	6	7	8	9	10	Final
Alberta (Walker) 🔨	0	3	0	0	0	2	0	1	1	X	7
(Manitoba) Wild Card #2 (Zacharias)	1	0	1	1	1	0	1	0	0	X	5

Sheet C	1	2	3	4	5	6	7	8	9	10	Final
Northwest Territories (Galusha)	0	1	0	1	0	1	0	1	0	X	4
Canada (Einarson) 🔨	1	0	3	0	0	0	2	0	2	X	8

The Northwest Territories vs. Canada match was rescheduled to Monday, February 22, at 8:30 am, as Jo-Ann Rizzo of Team Northwest Territories was experiencing food poisoning symptoms. The three other games took place as regularly scheduled.

Sheet D	1	2	3	4	5	6	7	8	9	10	Final
(Manitoba) Wild Card #3 (Peterson) 🔨	1	0	0	0	3	0	0	0	0	X	4
Ontario (Homan)	0	3	1	1	0	1	0	2	1	X	9

=== Draw 4 ===
Saturday, February 20, 6:30 pm

Sheet A	1	2	3	4	5	6	7	8	9	10	Final
Manitoba (Jones)	1	0	0	0	0	0	1	0	X	X	2
(Manitoba) Wild Card #1 (Fleury) 🔨	0	1	2	1	1	1	0	3	X	X	9

Sheet B	1	2	3	4	5	6	7	8	9	10	Final
Nunavut (Eddy)	0	1	0	0	1	0	1	0	X	X	3
Saskatchewan (Anderson) 🔨	2	0	0	4	0	2	0	1	X	X	9

Sheet C	1	2	3	4	5	6	7	8	9	10	Final
New Brunswick (Adams) 🔨	0	0	0	0	2	2	0	0	X	X	4
Prince Edward Island (Birt)	0	5	1	3	0	0	0	3	X	X	12

Sheet D	1	2	3	4	5	6	7	8	9	10	Final
Quebec (St-Georges)	0	2	2	0	1	0	2	1	0	1	9
British Columbia (Brown) 🔨	1	0	0	1	0	2	0	0	1	0	5

=== Draw 5 ===
Sunday, February 21, 8:30 am

Sheet A	1	2	3	4	5	6	7	8	9	10	Final
Canada (Einarson) 🔨	1	0	1	0	2	0	1	0	0	1	6
(Manitoba) Wild Card #3 (Peterson)	0	1	0	1	0	1	0	1	0	0	4

Sheet B	1	2	3	4	5	6	7	8	9	10	Final
Nova Scotia (Brothers)	0	1	0	1	0	0	1	0	2	X	5
Northwest Territories (Galusha) 🔨	2	0	2	0	0	2	0	3	0	X	9

Sheet C	1	2	3	4	5	6	7	8	9	10	Final
Yukon (Eby)	0	1	0	1	0	0	0	1	X	X	3
Ontario (Homan) 🔨	2	0	3	0	2	0	1	0	X	X	8

Sheet D	1	2	3	4	5	6	7	8	9	10	Final
Northern Ontario (Burns)	0	1	0	0	0	1	0	0	X	X	2
Alberta (Walker) 🔨	2	0	0	2	2	0	1	5	X	X	12

=== Draw 6 ===
Sunday, February 21, 1:30 pm

Sheet A	1	2	3	4	5	6	7	8	9	10	Final
Prince Edward Island (Birt) 🔨	0	0	3	0	0	2	0	1	0	0	6
Quebec (St-Georges)	0	0	0	2	0	0	0	0	4	2	8

Sheet B	1	2	3	4	5	6	7	8	9	10	Final
(Manitoba) Wild Card #1 (Fleury) 🔨	2	0	0	1	0	2	1	3	X	X	9
New Brunswick (Adams)	0	1	0	0	1	0	0	0	X	X	2

Sheet C	1	2	3	4	5	6	7	8	9	10	Final
Manitoba (Jones) 🔨	0	2	0	3	2	0	3	0	4	X	14
British Columbia (Brown)	1	0	1	0	0	1	0	2	0	X	5

Sheet D	1	2	3	4	5	6	7	8	9	10	Final
Newfoundland and Labrador (Hill)	0	1	1	3	0	1	1	0	2	X	9
Nunavut (Eddy) 🔨	1	0	0	0	1	0	0	1	0	X	3

=== Draw 7 ===
Sunday, February 21, 6:30 pm

Sheet A	1	2	3	4	5	6	7	8	9	10	Final
Ontario (Homan) 🔨	0	1	0	1	0	1	0	1	0	2	6
Alberta (Walker)	1	0	1	0	1	0	1	0	1	0	5

Sheet B	1	2	3	4	5	6	7	8	9	10	Final
Canada (Einarson) 🔨	2	0	0	2	2	4	0	2	X	X	12
Northern Ontario (Burns)	0	1	1	0	0	0	2	0	X	X	4

Sheet C	1	2	3	4	5	6	7	8	9	10	Final
Nova Scotia (Brothers) 🔨	2	0	1	0	0	2	0	2	1	X	8
(Manitoba) Wild Card #3 (Peterson)	0	1	0	1	2	0	1	0	0	X	5

Sheet D	1	2	3	4	5	6	7	8	9	10	Final
(Manitoba) Wild Card #2 (Zacharias) 🔨	5	0	2	0	6	1	0	1	X	X	15
Yukon (Eby)	0	1	0	1	0	0	1	0	X	X	3

=== Draw 8 ===
Monday, February 22, 1:30 pm

Sheet A	1	2	3	4	5	6	7	8	9	10	Final
British Columbia (Brown) 🔨	3	0	2	3	0	1	0	2	X	X	11
Nunavut (Eddy)	0	1	0	0	0	0	1	0	X	X	2

Sheet B	1	2	3	4	5	6	7	8	9	10	Final
Prince Edward Island (Birt) 🔨	3	0	3	0	1	0	2	0	3	X	12
Newfoundland and Labrador (Hill)	0	1	0	1	0	3	0	3	0	X	8

Sheet C	1	2	3	4	5	6	7	8	9	10	Final
(Manitoba) Wild Card #1 (Fleury)	0	2	0	2	0	0	1	0	1	1	7
Quebec (St-Georges) 🔨	2	0	3	0	0	2	0	1	0	0	8

Sheet D	1	2	3	4	5	6	7	8	9	10	Final
Saskatchewan (Anderson) 🔨	0	1	0	1	0	0	0	1	0	2	5
Manitoba (Jones)	0	0	1	0	0	1	1	0	1	0	4

=== Draw 9 ===
Monday, February 22, 6:30 pm

Sheet A	1	2	3	4	5	6	7	8	9	10	Final
Northwest Territories (Galusha) 🔨	2	0	0	0	1	1	0	1	1	0	6
(Manitoba) Wild Card #2 (Zacharias)	0	0	1	1	0	0	2	0	0	1	5

Sheet B	1	2	3	4	5	6	7	8	9	10	Final
(Manitoba) Wild Card #3 (Peterson)	1	0	0	2	0	0	1	0	1	1	6
Alberta (Walker) 🔨	0	0	2	0	0	1	0	1	0	0	4

Sheet C	1	2	3	4	5	6	7	8	9	10	Final
Northern Ontario (Burns)	0	1	2	0	0	0	0	0	5	0	8
Yukon (Eby) 🔨	2	0	0	1	1	1	0	1	0	1	7

Sheet D	1	2	3	4	5	6	7	8	9	10	Final
Ontario (Homan) 🔨	2	0	0	1	0	1	0	2	2	X	8
Nova Scotia (Brothers)	0	0	1	0	1	0	1	0	0	X	3

=== Draw 10 ===
Tuesday, February 23, 8:30 am

Sheet A	1	2	3	4	5	6	7	8	9	10	Final
New Brunswick (Adams)	0	0	0	1	3	0	0	1	0	2	7
Saskatchewan (Anderson) 🔨	0	1	1	0	0	2	1	0	1	0	6

Sheet B	1	2	3	4	5	6	7	8	9	10	Final
Quebec (St-Georges) 🔨	2	3	0	1	0	0	0	0	1	X	7
Nunavut (Eddy)	0	0	1	0	3	0	0	1	0	X	5

Sheet C	1	2	3	4	5	6	7	8	9	10	Final
Newfoundland and Labrador (Hill) 🔨	0	0	1	2	0	1	0	0	1	0	5
Manitoba (Jones)	1	1	0	0	1	0	1	1	0	1	6

Manitoba's win against Newfoundland and Labrador was Jennifer Jones's 153rd career Scotties win, surpassing Colleen Jones's previous record of 152 wins.

Sheet D	1	2	3	4	5	6	7	8	9	10	Final
British Columbia (Brown)	0	1	1	0	3	0	1	0	1	X	7
(Manitoba) Wild Card #1 (Fleury) 🔨	1	0	0	0	0	2	0	2	0	X	5

=== Draw 11 ===
Tuesday, February 23, 1:30 pm

Sheet A	1	2	3	4	5	6	7	8	9	10	Final
Nova Scotia (Brothers) 🔨	1	0	0	1	1	0	0	0	0	X	3
Canada (Einarson)	0	2	0	0	0	1	2	2	1	X	8

Sheet B	1	2	3	4	5	6	7	8	9	10	Final
Northern Ontario (Burns) 🔨	0	0	1	0	1	0	1	0	X	X	3
Ontario (Homan)	2	1	0	2	0	1	0	4	X	X	10

Sheet C	1	2	3	4	5	6	7	8	9	10	Final
(Manitoba) Wild Card #3 (Peterson) 🔨	0	2	0	0	0	1	0	1	0	1	5
(Manitoba) Wild Card #2 (Zacharias)	0	0	0	0	1	0	2	0	1	0	4

Sheet D	1	2	3	4	5	6	7	8	9	10	Final
Alberta (Walker) 🔨	1	0	0	1	0	3	0	2	1	X	8
Northwest Territories (Galusha)	0	1	1	0	1	0	0	0	0	X	3

=== Draw 12 ===
Tuesday, February 23, 6:30 pm

Sheet A	1	2	3	4	5	6	7	8	9	10	Final
(Manitoba) Wild Card #1 (Fleury) 🔨	1	1	0	2	0	0	3	0	1	2	10
Prince Edward Island (Birt)	0	0	1	0	2	1	0	2	0	0	6

Sheet B	1	2	3	4	5	6	7	8	9	10	Final
Newfoundland and Labrador (Hill)	0	0	0	1	0	0	0	0	X	X	1
British Columbia (Brown) 🔨	1	1	2	0	0	3	2	1	X	X	10

Sheet C	1	2	3	4	5	6	7	8	9	10	Final
Quebec (St-Georges)	0	2	1	1	0	2	0	0	0	X	6
Saskatchewan (Anderson) 🔨	3	0	0	0	2	0	0	1	3	X	9

Sheet D	1	2	3	4	5	6	7	8	9	10	11	Final
Nunavut (Eddy) 🔨	2	0	0	2	0	3	0	1	0	0	0	8
New Brunswick (Adams)	0	2	1	0	1	0	1	0	2	1	1	9

=== Draw 13 ===
Wednesday, February 24, 8:30 am

Sheet A	1	2	3	4	5	6	7	8	9	10	Final
(Manitoba) Wild Card #3 (Peterson)	0	0	0	4	0	0	2	3	0	X	9
Northern Ontario (Burns) 🔨	0	1	1	0	1	1	0	0	1	X	5

Sheet B	1	2	3	4	5	6	7	8	9	10	Final
(Manitoba) Wild Card #2 (Zacharias) 🔨	1	0	0	1	0	2	1	0	0	1	6
Nova Scotia (Brothers)	0	2	1	0	1	0	0	0	1	0	5

Sheet C	1	2	3	4	5	6	7	8	9	10	Final
Ontario (Homan) 🔨	1	0	0	0	2	0	0	2	0	X	5
Northwest Territories (Galusha)	0	0	1	1	0	1	2	0	2	X	7

Sheet D	1	2	3	4	5	6	7	8	9	10	Final
Yukon (Eby)	1	2	0	2	0	1	0	1	0	X	7
Canada (Einarson) 🔨	0	0	3	0	4	0	2	0	2	X	11

=== Draw 14 ===
Wednesday, February 24, 1:30 pm

Sheet A	1	2	3	4	5	6	7	8	9	10	Final
Quebec (St-Georges) 🔨	0	3	0	3	0	1	0	0	2	X	9
Newfoundland and Labrador (Hill)	0	0	1	0	1	0	1	1	0	X	4

Sheet B	1	2	3	4	5	6	7	8	9	10	Final
Saskatchewan (Anderson)	0	1	2	0	0	2	0	1	0	2	8
(Manitoba) Wild Card #1 (Fleury) 🔨	2	0	0	1	2	0	0	0	2	0	7

Sheet C	1	2	3	4	5	6	7	8	9	10	Final
British Columbia (Brown)	0	0	0	1	1	0	2	0	1	X	5
New Brunswick (Adams) 🔨	2	1	3	0	0	2	0	1	0	X	9

Sheet D	1	2	3	4	5	6	7	8	9	10	Final
Manitoba (Jones)	0	1	0	2	1	0	2	0	3	X	9
Prince Edward Island (Birt) 🔨	2	0	1	0	0	1	0	1	0	X	5

=== Draw 15 ===
Wednesday, February 24, 6:30 pm

Sheet A	1	2	3	4	5	6	7	8	9	10	Final
(Manitoba) Wild Card #2 (Zacharias)	0	2	0	1	0	2	0	0	1	0	6
Ontario (Homan) 🔨	2	0	1	0	1	0	0	3	0	1	8

Sheet B	1	2	3	4	5	6	7	8	9	10	Final
Northwest Territories (Galusha) 🔨	0	1	2	0	4	0	3	0	X	X	10
Yukon (Eby)	0	0	0	1	0	1	0	0	X	X	2

Sheet C	1	2	3	4	5	6	7	8	9	10	Final
Canada (Einarson)	0	2	0	1	0	1	2	2	X	X	8
Alberta (Walker) 🔨	0	0	1	0	2	0	0	0	X	X	3

Sheet D	1	2	3	4	5	6	7	8	9	10	Final
Nova Scotia (Brothers) 🔨	2	0	1	1	1	2	1	0	X	X	8
Northern Ontario (Burns)	0	1	0	0	0	0	0	2	X	X	3

=== Draw 16 ===
Thursday, February 25, 8:30 am

Sheet A	1	2	3	4	5	6	7	8	9	10	Final
Saskatchewan (Anderson) 🔨	1	0	0	0	3	1	2	0	0	1	8
British Columbia (Brown)	0	1	1	1	0	0	0	2	2	0	7

Sheet B	1	2	3	4	5	6	7	8	9	10	Final
New Brunswick (Adams)	0	0	1	0	1	0	1	0	X	X	3
Manitoba (Jones) 🔨	3	3	0	2	0	1	0	3	X	X	12

Sheet C	1	2	3	4	5	6	7	8	9	10	Final
Prince Edward Island (Birt) 🔨	0	0	0	4	0	0	2	0	4	X	10
Nunavut (Eddy)	0	2	2	0	0	2	0	2	0	X	8

Sheet D	1	2	3	4	5	6	7	8	9	10	Final
(Manitoba) Wild Card #1 (Fleury) 🔨	2	0	0	2	2	0	1	4	X	X	11
Newfoundland and Labrador (Hill)	0	1	0	0	0	1	0	0	X	X	2

=== Draw 17 ===
Thursday, February 25, 1:30 pm

Sheet A	1	2	3	4	5	6	7	8	9	10	Final
Alberta (Walker) 🔨	2	2	2	1	3	0	0	1	X	X	11
Yukon (Eby)	0	0	0	0	0	1	0	0	X	X	1

Sheet B	1	2	3	4	5	6	7	8	9	10	Final
Ontario (Homan) 🔨	1	0	1	1	0	2	1	0	0	1	7
Canada (Einarson)	0	2	0	0	0	0	0	1	1	0	4

Sheet C	1	2	3	4	5	6	7	8	9	10	Final
(Manitoba) Wild Card #2 (Zacharias)	1	1	0	1	0	1	1	0	4	X	9
Northern Ontario (Burns) 🔨	0	0	2	0	1	0	0	1	0	X	4

Sheet D	1	2	3	4	5	6	7	8	9	10	11	Final
Northwest Territories (Galusha) 🔨	0	2	0	0	2	0	3	1	0	0	0	8
(Manitoba) Wild Card #3 (Peterson)	0	0	2	1	0	2	0	0	2	1	1	9

=== Draw 18 ===
Thursday, February 25, 6:30 pm

Sheet A	1	2	3	4	5	6	7	8	9	10	Final
Nunavut (Eddy)	0	0	0	0	2	0	1	0	0	X	3
Manitoba (Jones) 🔨	0	2	2	1	0	1	0	2	2	X	10

Sheet B	1	2	3	4	5	6	7	8	9	10	Final
British Columbia (Brown) 🔨	1	0	1	0	2	2	0	0	3	X	9
Prince Edward Island (Birt)	0	2	0	1	0	0	1	1	0	X	5

Sheet C	1	2	3	4	5	6	7	8	9	10	Final
Saskatchewan (Anderson) 🔨	1	0	1	2	0	2	3	0	X	X	9
Newfoundland and Labrador (Hill)	0	1	0	0	1	0	0	1	X	X	3

Sheet D	1	2	3	4	5	6	7	8	9	10	Final
New Brunswick (Adams)	2	0	0	3	0	1	0	0	1	0	7
Quebec (St-Georges) 🔨	0	2	0	0	2	0	3	1	0	1	9

== Championship pool standings ==
The top four teams from each pool advance to the championship pool. All wins and losses earned in the round robin will be carried forward into the championship pool. Wins in tiebreaker games are not carried forward.

Final Championship Pool Standings

Key
Teams to Playoffs
Teams to Tiebreaker

Team	Skip	W	L	PF	PA	EW	EL	BE	SE	S%
Ontario	Rachel Homan	10	2	84	59	57	45	3	17	81%
Canada	Kerri Einarson	10	2	99	58	58	45	4	18	82%
Alberta	Laura Walker	9	3	92	55	54	43	8	17	78%
Manitoba	Jennifer Jones	9	3	99	64	58	44	5	19	83%
(Manitoba) Wild Card #3	Beth Peterson	7	5	85	76	51	50	2	14	76%
Saskatchewan	Sherry Anderson	6	6	81	80	51	52	5	14	76%
Quebec	Laurie St-Georges	6	6	80	82	46	52	8	9	74%
(Manitoba) Wild Card #1	Chelsea Carey	6	6	83	68	51	49	7	15	80%

== Championship pool results ==
=== Draw 19 ===
Friday, February 26, 12:30 pm

Sheet A	1	2	3	4	5	6	7	8	9	10	11	Final
Alberta (Walker) 🔨	0	1	2	0	2	0	0	0	1	0	1	7
Quebec (St-Georges)	0	0	0	2	0	1	0	2	0	1	0	6

Sheet B	1	2	3	4	5	6	7	8	9	10	Final
Saskatchewan (Anderson)	1	0	3	0	0	1	0	0	1	0	6
Canada (Einarson) 🔨	0	1	0	2	2	0	2	1	0	2	10

Sheet C	1	2	3	4	5	6	7	8	9	10	Final
Ontario (Homan) 🔨	1	0	1	0	1	1	0	0	2	1	7
(Manitoba) Wild Card #1 (Fleury)	0	2	0	2	0	0	1	1	0	0	6

Sheet D	1	2	3	4	5	6	7	8	9	10	Final
Manitoba (Jones) 🔨	3	1	0	0	1	0	2	0	0	5	12
(Manitoba) Wild Card #3 (Peterson)	0	0	2	3	0	1	0	2	0	0	8

=== Draw 20 ===
Friday, February 26, 6:30 pm

Sheet A	1	2	3	4	5	6	7	8	9	10	11	Final
(Manitoba) Wild Card #3 (Peterson)	0	0	2	0	2	0	0	4	1	0	1	10
Saskatchewan (Anderson) 🔨	1	1	0	1	0	2	1	0	0	3	0	9

Sheet B	1	2	3	4	5	6	7	8	9	10	11	Final
Quebec (St-Georges)	0	1	0	0	2	0	0	3	1	0	0	7
Ontario (Homan) 🔨	1	0	0	1	0	2	1	0	0	2	1	8

Sheet C	1	2	3	4	5	6	7	8	9	10	Final
Manitoba (Jones) 🔨	0	1	0	1	0	2	0	1	0	X	5
Alberta (Walker)	0	0	2	0	1	0	1	0	3	X	7

Sheet D	1	2	3	4	5	6	7	8	9	10	Final
Canada (Einarson) 🔨	1	0	1	2	0	0	3	2	X	X	9
(Manitoba) Wild Card #1 (Fleury)	0	1	0	0	1	1	0	0	X	X	3

=== Draw 21 ===
Saturday, February 27, 12:30 pm

Sheet A	1	2	3	4	5	6	7	8	9	10	Final
Ontario (Homan)	0	0	0	0	1	0	0	0	X	X	1
Manitoba (Jones) 🔨	1	1	1	1	0	1	3	1	X	X	9

Sheet B	1	2	3	4	5	6	7	8	9	10	Final
(Manitoba) Wild Card #1 (Fleury)	0	0	2	0	2	0	0	1	1	0	6
(Manitoba) Wild Card #3 (Peterson) 🔨	1	1	0	1	0	1	0	0	0	1	5

Sheet C	1	2	3	4	5	6	7	8	9	10	Final
Quebec (St-Georges)	0	0	1	0	2	0	1	0	0	X	4
Canada (Einarson) 🔨	1	1	0	1	0	1	0	2	1	X	7

Sheet D	1	2	3	4	5	6	7	8	9	10	Final
Alberta (Walker) 🔨	3	1	0	0	0	3	0	2	X	X	9
Saskatchewan (Anderson)	0	0	2	1	0	0	1	0	X	X	4

=== Draw 22 ===
Saturday, February 27, 6:30 pm

Sheet A	1	2	3	4	5	6	7	8	9	10	Final
(Manitoba) Wild Card #1 (Fleury) 🔨	1	0	2	0	1	0	0	0	0	X	4
Alberta (Walker)	0	1	0	1	0	2	1	2	2	X	9

Sheet B	1	2	3	4	5	6	7	8	9	10	11	Final
Canada (Einarson) 🔨	0	0	2	0	2	2	0	1	0	2	0	9
Manitoba (Jones)	0	1	0	3	0	0	2	0	3	0	1	10

Sheet C	1	2	3	4	5	6	7	8	9	10	Final
Saskatchewan (Anderson)	0	0	1	0	0	0	1	0	X	X	2
Ontario (Homan) 🔨	0	2	0	1	1	1	0	2	X	X	7

Sheet D	1	2	3	4	5	6	7	8	9	10	Final
(Manitoba) Wild Card #3 (Peterson)	0	3	0	0	2	0	4	1	X	X	10
Quebec (St-Georges) 🔨	0	0	0	2	0	1	0	0	X	X	3

== Tiebreaker ==
Sunday, February 28, 8:00 am

Sheet D	1	2	3	4	5	6	7	8	9	10	Final
Alberta (Walker) 🔨	1	0	0	1	1	0	2	1	0	3	9
Manitoba (Jones)	0	2	2	0	0	2	0	0	2	0	8

Player percentages
Alberta		Manitoba	
Rachelle Brown	94%	Lisa Weagle	86%
Taylor McDonald	83%	Jocelyn Peterman	78%
Kate Cameron	78%	Kaitlyn Lawes	83%
Laura Walker	75%	Jennifer Jones	73%
Total	82%	Total	80%

== Playoffs ==
Semifinal			Final
			1	Ontario	7
2	Canada	9	2	Canada	9
3	Alberta	3

=== Semifinal ===
Sunday, February 28, 12:30 pm

Sheet C	1	2	3	4	5	6	7	8	9	10	Final
Canada (Einarson) 🔨	1	0	2	0	0	3	0	3	X	X	9
Alberta (Walker)	0	1	0	1	0	0	1	0	X	X	3

Player percentages
Canada		Alberta	
Briane Meilleur	78%	Rachelle Brown	88%
Shannon Birchard	81%	Taylor McDonald	69%
Val Sweeting	73%	Kate Cameron	55%
Kerri Einarson	80%	Laura Walker	63%
Total	78%	Total	68%

=== Final ===
Sunday, February 28, 6:30 pm

Sheet C	1	2	3	4	5	6	7	8	9	10	Final
Ontario (Homan) 🔨	0	2	0	1	0	1	0	1	2	0	7
Canada (Einarson)	1	0	1	0	3	0	2	0	0	2	9

Player percentages
Ontario		Canada	
Joanne Courtney	86%	Briane Meilleur	95%
Sarah Wilkes	78%	Shannon Birchard	88%
Emma Miskew	78%	Val Sweeting	75%
Rachel Homan	75%	Kerri Einarson	88%
Total	79%	Total	86%

== Statistics ==
=== Top 5 player percentages ===
After Championship Pool; minimum 6 games

Key
First All-Star Team
Second All-Star Team

Leads	%
(Manitoba) Lisa Weagle	90
(British Columbia) Samantha Fisher	84
(Ontario) Joanne Courtney	83
(Prince Edward Island) Michelle McQuaid	82
WC1 Kristin MacCuish	82
WC3 Brittany Tran	82
(Alberta) Rachelle Brown	82

Seconds	%
(Canada) Shannon Birchard	83
(Manitoba) Jocelyn Peterman	82
(Ontario) Sarah Wilkes	80
WC1 Liz Fyfe	80
(British Columbia) Dezaray Hawes	80

Thirds	%
(Canada) Val Sweeting	81
WC1 Selena Njegovan	80
(Prince Edward Island) Marie Christianson	80
(Manitoba) Kaitlyn Lawes	80
(Ontario) Emma Miskew	78

Skips	%
(Canada) Kerri Einarson	83
(Ontario) Rachel Homan	83
(Manitoba) Jennifer Jones	79
(Alberta) Laura Walker	78
WC1 Chelsea Carey	77

== Awards ==
The awards and all-star teams were as follows:

All-Star Teams

First Team

- Skip: Kerri Einarson, Team Canada
- Third: Val Sweeting, Team Canada
- Second: Shannon Birchard, Team Canada
- Lead: Lisa Weagle, Manitoba

Second Team

- Skip: Rachel Homan, Ontario
- Third: (Manitoba) Selena Njegovan, Wild Card #1
- Second: Jocelyn Peterman, Manitoba
- Lead: Joanne Courtney, Ontario

Marj Mitchell Sportsmanship Award

- Laurie St-Georges, Quebec

Joan Mead Builder Award

- Shannon Kleibrink, long-time committee member of the prestigious Autumn Gold Curling Classic Ladies Bonspiel in Calgary.

== Final standings ==
Team	Rank
Canada	1st place, gold medalist(s)
Ontario	2nd place, silver medalist(s)
Alberta	3rd place, bronze medalist(s)
Manitoba	4
(Manitoba) Wild Card #3	5
Saskatchewan	6
Quebec	7
(Manitoba) Wild Card #1	8
British Columbia	T–9
Northwest Territories	T–9
Prince Edward Island	T–9
New Brunswick	T–12
Nova Scotia	T–12
(Manitoba) Wild Card #2	T–12
Newfoundland and Labrador	T–15
Northern Ontario	T–15
Nunavut	T–17
Yukon	T–17

== Provincial and territorial playdowns ==
Due to the COVID-19 pandemic, many provincial playdowns were cancelled, with member associations electing to send their 2020 champions to the Scotties.

- Alberta Scotties Tournament of Hearts: Cancelled
- British Columbia Scotties Tournament of Hearts: Not held.
- Manitoba Scotties Tournament of Hearts: Not held.
- New Brunswick Scotties Tournament of Hearts: Cancelled.
- The 2021 Newfoundland and Labrador Scotties Tournament of Hearts was held January 29–30 in St. John's. Team Sarah Hill defeated Team Mackenzie Mitchell three games to one in the best of five series. They were the only teams that entered.
- Northern Ontario Scotties Tournament of Hearts: Not held.
- The 2021 Northwest Territories Scotties Tournament of Hearts was held January 30–31 in Yellowknife. Team Kerry Galusha defeated Team Rogers 10–6 in the final to win the event. Three teams entered the championship and played a round robin which qualified two of them for the final.
- Nova Scotia Scotties Tournament of Hearts: Not held.
- Nunavut Scotties Tournament of Hearts: Not held.
- Ontario Scotties Tournament of Hearts: Not held.
- The 2021 Prince Edward Island Scotties Tournament of Hearts was held January 29–30 in O'Leary. Team Suzanne Birt defended their title as provincial champions by defeating Team Darlene London is a best of five series 3 games to 0. They were the only two rinks that entered the event.
- Quebec Scotties Tournament of Hearts: Not held.
- Saskatchewan Scotties Tournament of Hearts: Not held. Saskatchewan officials blocked a proposed bubble. To account for changes in teams between seasons, teams were selected based on both 2019–20 and 2020–21 season performance.
- The 2021 Yukon Scotties Tournament of Hearts was held January 15–17 in Whitehorse. Team Laura Eby defeated Team Patty Wallingham 3 games to 2 in a best of five series for the championship. They were the only two rinks to enter.
