= 2012 Saskatchewan Scotties Tournament of Hearts =

The 2012 Saskatchewan Scotties Tournament of Hearts, Saskatchewan's women's provincial curling championship, was held from January 25 to 29 at the Humboldt Curling Club in Humboldt, Saskatchewan. The winning team of Michelle Englot, represented Saskatchewan at the 2012 Scotties Tournament of Hearts in Red Deer, Alberta, where the team went 5-6 in round robin play.

== Qualification process ==
Twelve teams will qualify for the provincial tournament through several berths. The qualification process is as follows:

Teams	Qualification method	Berths	Qualifying team
Team 1	Highest Ranked CTRS Team as of December 12	1	Stefanie Lawton
Team 2	2nd Highest Ranked CTRS Team as of December 12	1	Jolene Campbell
Team 3	3rd Highest Ranked CTRS Team as of December 12	1	Michelle Englot
Team 4	Highest Ranked Saskatchewan Women's Curling Tour Team as of December 12	1	Trish Paulsen
Teams 5-8	Northern Saskatchewan Curling Association Qualifier	4	Rachel Fritzler; Jill Shumay; Darlene Gillies; Robyn Silvernagle
Teams 9-12	Southern Saskatchewan Curling Association Qualifier	4	Chantelle Eberle; Mandy Selzer; Susan Lang; Candace Chisholm

== Teams ==
Skip	Vice	Second	Lead	Club
Jolene Campbell	Melissa Hoffman	Maegan Clark	Michelle McIvor	Humboldt Curling Club, Humboldt
Candace Chisholm	Brooklyn Lemon	Natalie Bloomfield	Kristy Johnson	Maryfield Curling Club, Maryfield
Chantelle Eberle	Nancy Inglis	Debbie Lozinski	Susan Hoffart	Callie Curling Club, Regina
Michelle Englot	Lana Vey	Roberta Materi	Sarah Slywka	Tartan Curling Club, Regina
Rachel Fritzler	Ashley Quick	Amy Merkosky	Alyssa Johns	Granite Curling Club, Saskatoon
Darlene Gillies	Linda Kloschinsky	Wanda Heitt	Tracy Heidt	Kerrobert Curling Club, Kerrobert
Susan Lang	Linda Burnham	Donna Ell	Pat Bell	Callie Curling Club, Regina
Stefanie Lawton	Sherry Anderson	Sherri Singler	Marliese Kasner	Granite Curling Club, Saskatoon
Trish Paulsen	Kari Kennedy	Sarah Collin	Tessa Ruetz	Nutana Curling Club, Saskatoon
Mandy Selzer	Erin Selzer	Kristen Mitchell	Megan Selzer	Balgonie Curling Club, Balgonie
Jill Shumay	Kara Johnston	Taryn Holtby	Jinaye Ayrey	Nutana Curling Club, Saskatoon
Robyn Silvernagle	Kelsey Dutton	Dayna Demmans	Cristina Goertzen	Meadow Lake Curling Club, Meadow Lake

== Standings ==
=== Pool A ===
Skip (Club)	W	L	PF	PA	Ends Won	Ends Lost	Blank Ends	Stolen Ends
Stefanie Lawton (Granite)	4	1	38	24	23	18	6	4
Chantelle Eberle (Callie)	3	2	35	27	23	20	2	5
Robyn Silvernagle (Meadow Lake)	3	2	28	29	18	21	6	4
Darlene Gillies (Kerrobert)	2	3	35	23	21	18	7	6
Mandy Selzer (Balgonie)	2	3	24	30	19	17	5	8
Jolene Campbell (Humboldt)	1	4	19	36	15	24	4	2

=== Pool B ===
Skip (Club)	W	L	PF	PA	Ends Won	Ends Lost	Blank Ends	Stolen Ends
Michelle Englot (Tartan)	5	0	45	28	24	17	1	8
Jill Shumay (Nutana)	3	2	36	35	24	20	4	8
Candace Chisholm (Maryfield)	3	2	41	37	23	21	4	4
Trish Paulsen (Nutana)	2	3	32	30	18	23	7	4
Susan Lang (Callie)	1	4	29	41	17	22	2	3
Rachel Fritzler (Granite)	1	4	36	47	21	24	3	3

== Results ==
=== Draw 1 ===
January 25, 2:00 PM CT

Sheet A	1	2	3	4	5	6	7	8	9	10	Final
Fritzler	0	2	0	0	2	0	0	2	0	X	6
Lang	2	0	2	0	0	3	0	0	5	X	12

Sheet B	1	2	3	4	5	6	7	8	9	10	Final
Silvernagle	0	1	0	0	1	0	0	0	0	3	5
Gillies	1	0	0	1	0	0	1	0	1	0	4

=== Draw 2 ===
January 25, 7:30 PM CT

Sheet A	1	2	3	4	5	6	7	8	9	10	Final
Englot	0	2	0	2	0	2	0	1	2	X	9
Shumay	0	0	1	0	2	0	1	0	0	X	4

Sheet B	1	2	3	4	5	6	7	8	9	10	Final
Campbell	0	1	0	0	1	0	1	0	X	X	3
Eberle	1	0	2	1	0	2	0	3	X	X	9

Sheet C	1	2	3	4	5	6	7	8	9	10	Final
Lawton	1	0	1	0	0	3	0	0	1	X	6
Selzer	0	0	0	0	1	0	1	0	0	X	2

Sheet D	1	2	3	4	5	6	7	8	9	10	Final
Paulsen	0	0	0	2	0	0	0	4	2	X	8
Chisholm	1	1	0	0	0	2	0	0	0	X	4

=== Draw 3 ===
January 26, 2:00 PM CT

Sheet A	1	2	3	4	5	6	7	8	9	10	11	Final
Campbell	0	0	2	0	0	1	0	1	0	0	0	4
Gillies	0	1	0	0	1	0	0	0	1	1	1	5

Sheet B	1	2	3	4	5	6	7	8	9	10	Final
Selzer	0	1	0	3	1	1	0	0	1	X	7
Silvernagle	0	0	2	0	0	0	1	1	0	X	4

Sheet C	1	2	3	4	5	6	7	8	9	10	Final
Paulsen	2	0	2	1	0	0	1	1	0	X	7
Lang	0	1	0	0	1	1	0	0	1	X	4

Sheet D	1	2	3	4	5	6	7	8	9	10	Final
Shumay	2	0	2	0	0	3	1	1	1	X	10
Fritzler	0	1	0	2	3	0	0	0	0	X	6

=== Draw 4 ===
January 26, 7:30 PM CT

Sheet A	1	2	3	4	5	6	7	8	9	10	Final
Fritzler	1	0	1	0	2	0	3	0	2	0	9
Chisholm	0	1	0	2	0	1	0	4	0	3	11

Sheet B	1	2	3	4	5	6	7	8	9	10	Final
Gillies	1	1	0	1	1	0	2	0	1	0	7
Lawton	0	0	3	0	0	2	0	2	0	1	8

Sheet C	1	2	3	4	5	6	7	8	9	10	Final
Eberle	1	0	1	0	2	0	0	2	0	0	6
Silvernagle	0	1	0	1	0	1	2	0	2	2	9

Sheet D	1	2	3	4	5	6	7	8	9	10	Final
Lang	2	0	0	0	0	X	X	X	X	X	2
Englot	0	5	1	2	2	X	X	X	X	X	10

=== Draw 5 ===
January 27, 10:00 AM CT

Sheet A	1	2	3	4	5	6	7	8	9	10	Final
Lawton	0	2	0	1	2	0	0	3	X	X	8
Silvernagle	0	0	1	0	0	0	1	0	X	X	2

Sheet B	1	2	3	4	5	6	7	8	9	10	Final
Chisholm	1	0	1	3	0	2	0	3	X	X	10
Lang	0	2	0	0	1	0	1	0	X	X	4

Sheet C	1	2	3	4	5	6	7	8	9	10	Final
Englot	1	0	2	0	2	0	2	2	0	X	9
Fritzler	0	3	0	2	0	2	0	0	1	X	8

Sheet D	1	2	3	4	5	6	7	8	9	10	Final
Eberle	0	2	1	0	1	1	0	2	X	X	7
Gillies	1	0	0	0	0	0	1	0	X	X	2

=== Draw 6 ===
January 27, 2:30 PM CT

Sheet A	1	2	3	4	5	6	7	8	9	10	Final
Englot	0	2	1	0	2	0	0	1	0	2	8
Chisholm	1	0	0	2	0	2	1	0	1	0	7

Sheet B	1	2	3	4	5	6	7	8	9	10	Final
Shumay	0	1	1	0	1	2	0	1	0	X	6
Paulsen	2	0	0	0	0	0	2	0	0	X	4

Sheet C	1	2	3	4	5	6	7	8	9	10	Final
Eberle	0	0	1	0	0	2	0	2	0	X	5
Lawton	0	3	0	3	1	0	1	0	1	X	9

Sheet D	1	2	3	4	5	6	7	8	9	10	Final
Selzer	0	0	1	1	1	3	1	X	X	X	7
Campbell	0	0	0	0	0	0	0	X	X	X	0

=== Draw 7 ===
January 27, 7:30 PM CT

Sheet A	1	2	3	4	5	6	7	8	9	10	11	Final
Paulsen	2	0	0	1	1	0	0	0	0	2	0	6
Fritzler	0	1	1	0	0	1	1	0	2	0	1	7

Sheet B	1	2	3	4	5	6	7	8	9	10	Final
Gillies	3	0	0	2	0	4	3	X	X	X	12
Selzer	0	2	1	0	1	0	0	X	X	X	4

Sheet C	1	2	3	4	5	6	7	8	9	10	Final
Silvernagle	0	3	1	0	2	0	2	0	X	X	8
Campbell	1	0	0	1	0	1	0	1	X	X	4

Sheet D	1	2	3	4	5	6	7	8	9	10	Final
Lang	1	0	2	0	1	1	0	2	0	0	7
Shumay	0	3	0	2	0	0	1	0	1	1	8

=== Draw 8 ===
January 28, 9:00 AM CT

Sheet A	1	2	3	4	5	6	7	8	9	10	Final
Selzer	1	0	1	0	0	1	0	1	0	0	4
Eberle	0	2	0	2	1	0	1	0	1	1	8

Sheet B	1	2	3	4	5	6	7	8	9	10	Final
Englot	2	0	2	2	0	2	0	1	0	X	9
Paulsen	0	1	0	0	3	0	2	0	1	X	7

Sheet C	1	2	3	4	5	6	7	8	9	10	11	Final
Chisholm	0	2	2	0	0	3	0	0	1	0	1	9
Shumay	2	0	0	1	1	0	2	0	0	2	0	8

Sheet D	1	2	3	4	5	6	7	8	9	10	11	Final
Lawton	0	1	1	0	2	0	1	0	1	1	0	7
Campbell	2	0	0	3	0	1	0	1	0	0	1	8

=== Tiebreaker ===
January 28, 2:00 PM CT

Sheet A	1	2	3	4	5	6	7	8	9	10	Final
Eberle	1	0	0	0	3	2	0	2	X	X	8
Silvernagle	0	0	1	0	0	0	1	0	X	X	2

Sheet B	1	2	3	4	5	6	7	8	9	10	Final
Shumay	1	1	1	0	2	0	0	3	X	X	8
Chisholm	0	0	0	2	0	1	0	0	X	X	3

== Playoffs ==
Page playoff system
A1	Stefanie Lawton	6
B1	Michelle Englot	7
A2	Chantelle Eberle	6
B2	Jill Shumay	9

Semifinal
A1	Stefanie Lawton	6
B2	Jill Shumay	2

Final
B1	Michelle Englot	9
A1	Stefanie Lawton	7

=== A1 vs. B1 ===
January 28, 7:30 PM CT

Sheet A	1	2	3	4	5	6	7	8	9	10	Final
Lawton	0	0	1	0	2	1	0	2	0	0	6
Englot	1	1	0	1	0	0	1	0	2	1	7

=== A2 vs. B2 ===
January 28, 7:30 PM CT

Sheet C	1	2	3	4	5	6	7	8	9	10	Final
Eberle	1	0	1	0	2	0	0	2	0	X	6
Shumay	0	2	0	1	0	1	4	0	1	X	9

=== Semifinal ===
January 29, 1:00 PM CT

Sheet A	1	2	3	4	5	6	7	8	9	10	Final
Lawton	1	1	0	1	0	0	1	2	0	X	6
Shumay	0	0	1	0	1	0	0	0	0	X	2

=== Final ===
January 29, 5:00 PM CT

Sheet A	1	2	3	4	5	6	7	8	9	10	Final
Englot	2	0	1	0	3	0	2	1	0	X	9
Lawton	0	2	0	1	0	2	0	0	2	X	7

2012 Saskatchewan Scotties Tournament of Hearts

Michelle Englot
Saskatchewan Provincial Championship title

== Qualification rounds ==
=== Northern Qualification ===
The 2012 SaskPower Women's Northern Playdown took place from January 13 to 15 at the Prince Albert Curling Club in Prince Albert. The format of play was an open-entry triple knockout, and four teams qualified to the provincial playoffs.

==== Teams ====
Skip	Vice	Second	Lead	Club
Amanda Anderson	Vanessa Knoll	Michelle Johnson	Alyssa Despins	Nutana Curling Club, Saskatoon
Brett Barber	Kailena Bay	Allison Cameron	Nicole Bertsch	Biggar Curling Club, Biggar
Brandee Borne	Kara Kilden	Andrea Rudulier	Jennifer Buettner	Birch Hills Curling Club, Birch Hills
Debbie Folk	Nancy Martin	Lindsey Sunderland	Sharla Kruger	Nutana Curling Club, Saskatoon
Rachel Fritzler	Ashley Quick	Amy Merkosky	Alyssa Johns	Granite Curling Club, Saskatoon
Darlene Gillies	Linda Kloschinsky	Wanda Heitt	Tracy Heidt	Kerrobert Curling Club, Kerrobert
Tina Hill	Christy Walker	Nicole Beausoleil	Rebecca Venn	Battleford Curling Club, Battleford
Sherry Just	Melissa Klebeck	Sharlene Clarke	Alysha Shillingotn	Prince Albert Curling Club, Prince Albert
Jill Shumay	Kara Johnston	Taryn Holtby	Jinaye Ayrey	Nutana Curling Club, Saskatoon
Robyn Silvernagle	Kelsey Dutton	Dayna Demmans	Cristina Goertzen	Meadow Lake Curling Club, Meadow Lake
Jacqueline Swiderski	Delphine Soulier	Avis Halcro	Gail Anderson	Prince Albert Curling Club, Prince Albert
Delores Syrota	Kendra Syrota	Alana Broad	Sylvia Broad	Wadena Curling Club Wadena

==== A Event ====
Round of 16
Delores Syrota	5
Sherry Just	7
Jacqueline Swiderski	10
Brett Barber	11
Darlene Gillies	11
Amanda Anderson	4
Rachel Fritzler	8
Tina Hill	1

Quarterfinals
Sherry Just	7
Brandee Borne	11
Brett Barber	2
Robyn Silvernagle	9
Darlene Gillies	7
Debbie Folk	9
Rachel Fritzler	6
Jill Shumay	1

Semifinals
Brandee Borne	7
Robyn Silvernagle	1
Debbie Folk	7
Rachel Fritzler	8

A Qualifier
Brandee Borne	6
Rachel Fritzler	7

==== B Event ====
Round of 16
Delores Syrota	5
Brett Barber	11
Amanda Anderson	5
Jill Shumay	12
Jacqueline Swiderski	7
Sherry Just	10
Tina Hill	4
Darlene Gillies	8

Quarterfinals
Brett Barber	8
Debbie Folk	7
Jill Shumay	8
Robyn Silvernagle	1
Sherry Just	6
Darlene Gillies	8

Semifinals
Brett Barber	4
Jill Shumay	5
Brandee Borne	5
Darlene Gillies	4

B Qualifier
Jill Shumay	9
Brandee Borne	4

==== C Event ====
Quarterfinals
Jacqueline Swiderski	5
Tina Hill	10
Amanda Anderson	5
Delores Syrota	9

Semifinals
Tina Hill	9
Brett Barber	6
Delores Syrota	6
Darlene Gillies	8

C Qualifier 1
Tina Hill	6
Darlene Gillies	7

Quarterfinals		Semifinals		C Qualifier 2
				Brandee Borne	3
Debbie Folk	4			Robyn Silvernagle	9
Robyn Silvernagle	7	Robyn Silvernagle	11
		Sherry Just	6

=== Southern Qualification ===
The 2012 SaskPower Women's Southern Playdown took place from January 13 to 15 at the Weyburn Curling Club in Weyburn. The format of play was an open-entry triple knockout, and four teams qualified to the provincial playoffs.

==== Teams ====
Skip	Vice	Second	Lead	Club
Penny Barker	Amanda Craigie	Danielle Sicinski	Tamara Haberstock	Moose Jaw Curling Centre Moose Jaw
Candace Chisholm	Brooklyn Lemon	Natalie Bloomfield	Kristy Johnson	Maryfield Curling Club, Maryfield
Deanna Doig	Colleen Ackerman	Carla Sawicki	Carla Anaka	Tartan Curling Club Regina
Chantelle Eberle	Nancy Inglis	Debbie Lozinski	Susan Hoffart	Callie Curling Club, Regina
Shalon Fleming	Michelle Dayman	Terri Hillier-McIntosh	Marsha Munro	Highland Curling Club, Regina
Susan Lang	Linda Burnham	Donna Ell	Pat Bell	Callie Curling Club, Regina
Larisa Murray	Chelsey Peterson	Leah Mihalicz	Nicole Lang	Callie Curling Club, Regina
Sherrilee Orsted	Candace Newkirk	Marcy Cameron	Stephanie Barnstable	Estevan Curling Club Estevan
Mandy Selzer	Erin Selzer	Kristen Mitchell	Megan Selzer	Balgonie Curling Club, Balgonie

==== A-Event ====
Round of 16
Susan Lang	7
Shalon Fleming	6

Quarterfinals
Susan Lang	7
Candace Chisholm	8
Sherrilee Orsted	6
Chantelle Eberle	9
Deanna Doig	6
Penny Barker	2
Larisa Murray	5
Mandy Selzer	9

Semifinals
Candace Chisholm	4
Chantelle Eberle	8
Deanna Doig	4
Mandy Selzer	7

A Qualifier
Chantelle Eberle	5
Mandy Selzer	4

==== B-Event ====
Round of 16
Penny Barker	8
Larisa Murray	3

Quarterfinals
Penny Barker	7
Candace Chisholm	5
Susan Lang	6
Deanna Doig	7
Sherrilee Orsted	8
Shalon Fleming	3

Semifinals
Penny Barker	8
Deanna Doig	5
Sherrilee Orsted	4
Mandy Selzer	7

B Qualifier
Penny Barker	4
Mandy Selzer	8

==== C-Event ====
Semifinals		C Qualifier 1
Larisa Murray	3
Susan Lang	11	Penny Barker	5
		Susan Lang	7

Semifinals		C Qualifier 2
Deanna Doig	7
Shalon Fleming	5	Deanna Doig	7
Sherrilee Orsted	5	Candace Chisholm	8
Candace Chisholm	6
