= 2011 Saskatchewan Scotties Tournament of Hearts =

The 2011 Saskatchewan Scotties Tournament of Hearts was the 2011 Saskatchewan provincial women's curling championship, held January 26–30 at the Jim Kook Recreation Complex in Outlook, Saskatchewan, Canada. The winning team of Amber Holland represented Saskatchewan at the 2011 Scotties Tournament of Hearts in Charlottetown, Prince Edward Island. Holland's team finished the round robin in first place at 9-2, going onto the 1-2 page playoff game, where they lost to team Canada. The team went on to the Semi-Final game, where they defeated Ontario moving on to the final. The team met Jennifer Jones and Team Canada once again, where in the 10th end of play, score tied, Canada with last rock, would steal the win, becoming the first Saskatchewan Team to win the Scotties since 1997, when Sandra Schmirler won her final Scotties, before dying of cancer. Amber Holland and team with returned to the 2012 Scotties Tournament of Hearts as defending champions Team Canada.

== Teams ==
Skip	Vice	Second	Lead	Club
Penny Barker	Amanda Craigie	Danielle Sicinski	Tamara Haberstock	Hillcrest Curling Club, Moose Jaw, Saskatchewan
Chantelle Eberle	Nancy Inglis	Allison Slupski	Debbie Lozinski	Tartan Curling Club, Regina
Michelle Englot	Lana Vey	Roberta Materi	Deanna Doig	Tartan Curling Club, Regina, Saskatchewan
Debbie Folk	Nancy Martin	Ashley Gregoire	Sharla Kruger	Nutana Curling Club, Saskatoon, Saskatchewan
Darlene Gillies	Wanda Heitt	Trish Johnson	Tracy Heidt	Unity Curling Club, Unity, Saskatchewan
Patty Hersikorn	Jill Shumay	Allison Gerhardt	Shelley Madsen	Nutana Curling Club, Saskatoon, Saskatchewan
Amber Holland	Kim Schneider	Tammy Schneider	Heather Kalenchuk	Kronau Curling Club, Kronau
Stefanie Lawton	Sherry Anderson	Sherri Singler	Marliese Kasner	Granite Curling Club, Saskatoon, Saskatchewan
Cindy Ricci	Jolene Campbell	Natalie Bloomfield	Kristy Johnson	Lampman Curling Club, Lampman, Saskatchewan
Mandy Selzer	Larissa Murray	Kristen Mitchell	Megan Selzer	Balgonie Curling Club, Balgonie, Saskatchewan
Robyn Silvernagle	Sasha Yole	Dayna Demmans	Cristina Goertzen	Meadow Lake Curling Club, Meadow Lake, Saskatchewan
Samantha Yachiw	Cathy Inglis (Skip)	Colleen Ackerman	Sarah Slywka	Tartan Curling Club, Regina, Saskatchewan

== Standings Pool A ==
Skip (Club)	W	L	PF	PA	Ends Won	Ends Lost	Blank Ends	Stolen Ends
Stefanie Lawton (Nutana)	5	0	45	18	22	11	5	7
Mandy Selzer (Balgonie)	3	2	29	34	19	20	7	4
Michelle Englot (Tartan)	3	2	38	29	23	22	3	8
Darlene Gillies (Unity)	2	3	28	32	17	24	3	6
Patty Hersikorn (Nutana)	1	4	23	34	18	22	4	5
Penny Barker (Hillcrest)	1	4	20	33	18	18	8	4

== Standings Pool B ==
Skip (Club)	W	L	PF	PA	Ends Won	Ends Lost	Blank Ends	Stolen Ends
Cindy Ricci (Lampman)	4	1	32	33	20	16	10	7
Amber Holland (Kronau)	3	2	35	28	20	22	7	3
Debbie Folk (Nutana)	3	2	40	29	22	19	6	6
Chantelle Eberle (Tartan)	2	3	32	30	21	22	6	3
Robyn Silvernagle (Meadow Lake)	2	3	24	27	17	20	11	4
Cathy Inglis (Tartan)	1	4	21	33	18	21	11	4

== Results ==
=== Draw 1 ===
January 26, 2:00 PM CT

Sheet A	1	2	3	4	5	6	7	8	9	10	Final
Inglis	1	0	0	0	1	0	2	0	0	0	4
Folk	0	0	1	1	0	3	0	2	0	1	8

Sheet B	1	2	3	4	5	6	7	8	9	10	11	Final
Hersikorn	0	1	0	0	0	0	1	1	1	0	0	4
Gillies	0	0	1	0	1	1	0	0	0	1	3	7

=== Draw 2 ===
January 26, 7:30 PM CT

Sheet A	1	2	3	4	5	6	7	8	9	10	Final
Lawton	0	0	3	0	3	2	0	1	X	X	9
Selzer	2	0	0	0	0	0	2	0	X	X	4

Sheet B	1	2	3	4	5	6	7	8	9	10	Final
Englot	0	2	0	0	1	1	0	0	3	X	7
Barker	0	0	1	0	0	0	1	1	0	X	3

Sheet C	1	2	3	4	5	6	7	8	9	10	Final
Holland	0	0	1	0	0	1	0	0	4	X	6
Silvernagle	0	0	0	1	1	0	0	1	0	X	3

Sheet D	1	2	3	4	5	6	7	8	9	10	Final
Eberle	0	0	1	0	0	3	0	1	0	1	6
Ricci	0	1	0	2	1	0	1	0	2	0	7

=== Draw 3 ===
January 27, 10:00 AM CT

Sheet A	1	2	3	4	5	6	7	8	9	10	Final
Barker	0	0	1	1	0	0	1	0	1	X	4
Hersikorn	0	4	0	0	1	1	0	2	0	X	8

Sheet B	1	2	3	4	5	6	7	8	9	10	Final
Lawton	2	2	0	4	0	2	X	X	X	X	10
Gillies	0	0	1	0	2	0	X	X	X	X	3

Sheet C	1	2	3	4	5	6	7	8	9	10	Final
Inglis	0	0	0	1	0	0	1	2	0	0	4
Ricci	0	0	0	0	1	1	0	0	2	2	6

Sheet D	1	2	3	4	5	6	7	8	9	10	Final
Folk	0	0	0	1	0	3	0	0	1	1	6
Holland	0	1	1	0	2	0	2	1	0	0	7

=== Draw 4 ===
January 27, 2:30 PM CT

Sheet A	1	2	3	4	5	6	7	8	9	10	Final
Folk	0	1	0	1	0	2	0	2	0	2	8
Eberle	0	0	2	0	2	0	1	0	1	0	6

Sheet B	1	2	3	4	5	6	7	8	9	10	Final
Selzer	2	0	0	1	0	0	0	3	0	1	7
Hersikorn	0	0	1	0	1	2	1	0	1	0	6

Sheet C	1	2	3	4	5	6	7	8	9	10	Final
Englot	0	0	1	0	2	1	1	2	0	1	8
Gillies	1	1	0	1	0	0	0	0	2	0	5

Sheet D	1	2	3	4	5	6	7	8	9	10	Final
Silvernagle	0	0	0	3	0	0	1	2	0	0	6
Inglis	0	0	0	0	1	1	0	0	1	1	4

=== Draw 5 ===
January 27, 7:30 PM CT

Sheet A	1	2	3	4	5	6	7	8	9	10	Final
Englot	2	0	1	0	0	0	2	0	2	0	7
Selzer	0	3	0	1	1	1	0	2	0	1	9

Sheet B	1	2	3	4	5	6	7	8	9	10	Final
Holland	0	1	2	0	0	3	0	1	0	0	7
Ricci	1	0	0	1	1	0	3	0	1	1	8

Sheet C	1	2	3	4	5	6	7	8	9	10	11	Final
Eberle	0	0	2	0	0	2	0	0	0	1	2	7
Silvernagle	0	1	0	1	1	0	1	1	0	0	0	5

Sheet D	1	2	3	4	5	6	7	8	9	10	Final
Lawton	2	0	0	3	3	0	0	1	X	X	9
Barker	0	1	0	0	0	2	0	0	X	X	3

=== Draw 6 ===
January 28, 10:00 AM CT

Sheet A	1	2	3	4	5	6	7	8	9	10	Final
Eberle	1	0	0	2	0	0	1	1	3	X	8
Inglis	0	1	1	0	1	0	0	0	0	X	3

Sheet B	1	2	3	4	5	6	7	8	9	10	Final
Selzer	1	0	1	1	0	0	1	0	0	X	4
Gillies	0	0	0	0	2	3	0	2	2	X	9

Sheet C	1	2	3	4	5	6	7	8	9	10	Final
Silvernagle	0	3	0	1	0	0	1	0	1	X	6
Folk	2	0	0	0	1	0	0	1	0	X	4

Sheet D	1	2	3	4	5	6	7	8	9	10	Final
Englot	1	1	2	0	3	0	0	1	2	X	10
Hersikorn	0	0	0	1	0	1	1	0	0	X	3

=== Draw 7 ===
January 28, 7:00 PM CT

Sheet A	1	2	3	4	5	6	7	8	9	10	Final
Ricci	1	0	1	1	0	1	0	1	0	X	5
Silvernagle	0	0	0	0	2	0	1	0	1	X	4

Sheet B	1	2	3	4	5	6	7	8	9	10	Final
Lawton	2	0	2	1	0	1	2	0	0	1	9
Englot	0	3	0	0	2	0	0	0	1	0	6

Sheet C	1	2	3	4	5	6	7	8	9	10	Final
Barker	0	1	0	0	0	1	0	1	0	X	3
Selzer	0	0	1	0	0	0	2	0	2	X	5

Sheet D	1	2	3	4	5	6	7	8	9	10	Final
Holland	0	0	3	0	3	0	1	0	3	X	10
Eberle	0	1	0	2	0	1	0	2	0	X	6

=== Draw 8 ===
January 29, 9:00 AM CT

Sheet A	1	2	3	4	5	6	7	8	9	10	Final
Lawton	2	0	3	0	2	1	X	X	X	X	8
Hersikorn	0	1	0	1	0	0	X	X	X	X	2

Sheet B	1	2	3	4	5	6	7	8	9	10	Final
Ricci	0	2	0	3	0	0	1	0	X	X	6
Folk	2	0	3	0	2	2	0	3	X	X	12

Sheet C	1	2	3	4	5	6	7	8	9	10	11	Final
Holland	0	0	1	0	1	0	1	0	0	2	0	5
Inglis	0	1	0	1	0	2	0	0	1	0	1	6

Sheet D	1	2	3	4	5	6	7	8	9	10	Final
Barker	1	1	1	0	1	0	1	0	2	X	7
Gillies	0	0	0	1	0	2	0	1	0	X	4

=== TieBreaker ===
January 29, 2:00 PM CT

Sheet A	1	2	3	4	5	6	7	8	9	10	11	Final
Michelle Englot	0	0	0	2	0	2	0	1	0	2	0	7
Mandy Selzer	2	1	0	0	1	0	2	0	1	0	1	8

Sheet B	1	2	3	4	5	6	7	8	9	10	Final
Amber Holland	0	1	0	0	1	0	0	3	0	X	5
Debbie Folk	0	0	0	1	0	1	1	0	1	X	4

== Playoffs ==
Page playoff system
A1	Stefanie Lawton	9
B1	Cindy Ricci	5
A2	Mandy Selzer	6
B2	Amber Holland	10

Semifinal
B1	Cindy Ricci	2
B2	Amber Holland	9

Final
A1	Stefanie Lawton	4
B2	Amber Holland	7

=== A1 vs. B1 ===
January 29, 7:30 PM CT

Sheet A	1	2	3	4	5	6	7	8	9	10	Final
Lawton	0	2	0	4	0	1	0	0	2	X	9
Ricci	0	0	1	0	2	0	0	2	0	X	5

=== A2 vs. B2 ===
January 29, 8:00 PM CT

Sheet B	1	2	3	4	5	6	7	8	9	10	Final
Selzer	0	2	0	3	0	0	0	1	0	0	6
Holland	2	0	2	0	1	0	1	0	2	2	10

=== Semifinal ===
January 30, 1:00 PM CT

Sheet B	1	2	3	4	5	6	7	8	9	10	Final
Ricci	0	0	0	0	0	2	X	X	X	X	2
Holland	1	3	1	2	2	0	X	X	X	X	9

=== Final ===
January 30, 5:00 PM CT

Sheet B	1	2	3	4	5	6	7	8	9	10	Final
Lawton	0	1	0	0	0	1	0	2	0	X	4
Holland	0	0	1	1	1	0	2	0	2	X	7

== Northern Qualification ==
The Northern Qualification round for the 2011 Saskatchewan Tournament of Hearts will take place January 13–16 at the Tisdale Curling Club in Tisdale, Saskatchewan. The format of play shall be an open-entry triple knockout qualifying four teams to the Provincial playoffs at the Jim Kook Recreation Complex in Outlook, Saskatchewan, January 26–30, 2011.

== Teams ==
Skip	Vice	Second	Lead	Club
Shellan Baranieski	Bonnie Whyley	Dana Palidwar	Rebecca Peters	Tisdale Curling Club, Tisdale, Saskatchewan
Brett Barber	Jen Antoshkiw	Kailena Bay	Allison Cameron	Biggar Curling Club, Biggar, Saskatchewan
Brandee Borne	Kara Kilden	Andrea Ruduiler	Julie Vandenmeele	Nutana Curling Club, Saskatoon, Saskatchewan
Heather Burnett	Larissa Wudrick	Melissa Surkan	Kristen Smith	Martensville Curling Club, Martensville, Saskatchewan
Glenda Caughlin	Coral Fraser	Charlotte Owens	Glenda Svenson	Tisdale Curling Club, Tisdale, Saskatchewan
Kelsey Dutton	Alyssa Despins	Lindley Paulsen	Michelle Johnson	Nutana Curling Club, Saskatoon, Saskatchewan
Debbie Folk	Nancy Martin	Ashley Gregoire	Sharla Kruger	Nutana Curling Club, Saskatoon, Saskatchewan
Darlene Gillies	Wanda Heitt	Trish Johnson	Tracy Heidt	Unity Curling Club, Unity, Saskatchewan
Patty Hersikorn	Jill Shumay	Allison Gerhardt	Shelley Madsen	Nutana Curling Club, Saskatoon, Saskatchewan
Tina Hill	Nicole Beausoleil	Christy Walker	Rebecca Venn	Battleford Curling Club, Battleford, Saskatchewan
Robyn Silvernagle	Sasha Yole	Dayna Demmans	Cristina Goertzen	Meadow Lake Curling Club, Meadow Lake, Saskatchewan
Jacqueline Swiderski	Delphine Soulier	Avis Halcro	Gail Anderson	Prince Albert Curling Club, Prince Albert, Saskatchewan
Delores Syrota	Kendra Syrota	Alana Melsted	Sylvia Broad	Wadena Curling Club, Wadena, Saskatchewan

== Results ==
=== A Event ===
Round of 16
Silvernagle	7
Gillies	4
Hill	12
Burnett	0
Swiderski	8
Barber	11
A4	Dutton	7
A4	Baranieski	6
A5	Hersikom	7
A5	Syrota	5

Quarterfinals
A1	Silvernagle	8
A2	Hill	9
A3	Barber	8
A7	Folk	12
A4	Dutton	6
A8	Borne	7
A5	Hersikom	9
A9	Caughlin	1

Semifinals
A6	Hill	6
A7	Folk	5
A8	Borne	6
A9	Hersikom	7

A Qualifier
A10	Hill	0
A11	Hersikom	7

=== B Event ===
Round of 16
Gillies	3
Syrota	8

Quarterfinals
B1	Syrota	4
A8	Dutton	7
A3	Swiderski	6
A6	Silvernagle	10
A4	Baranieski	12
A9	Caughlin	2

Semifinals
B2	Dutton	2
B3	Silvernagle	6
A10	Folk	5
B4	Baranieski	7

B Qualifier
A12	Hill	4
B6	Silvernagle	7

Quarterfinals			Semifinals			Finals
						B7	Baranieski	7
A2	Burnett	7				B8	Borne	5
A7	Barber	10	A11	Borne	7
			B5	Barber	6

B Final
B9	Silvernagle	7
B10	Baranieski	3

=== C Event ===
Round of 16

Quarterfinals
B1	Gillies	12
B3	Swiderski	6
B4	Caughlin	3
B5	Burnett	7

Semifinals
B10	Borne	2
C1	Gillies	4
B9	Hill	9
C2	Burnett	7

C1 Qualifier
C5	Gillies	7
C6	Hill	6

Round of 16

Quarterfinals
B6	Dutton	6
B8	Folk	8
B2	Syrota	12
B8	Barber	6

Semifinals
C3	Folk	8
C4	Syrota	7

C2 Qualifier
B11	Baranieski	5
C7	Folk	6

== Southern Qualification ==
The Southern Qualification round for the 2011 Saskatchewan Tournament of Hearts will take place January 13–16 at the Assiniboia Curling Club in Assiniboia, Saskatchewan. The format of play shall be an open-entry triple knockout qualifying four teams to the Provincial playoffs at the Jim Kook Recreation Complex in Outlook, Saskatchewan, January 26–30, 2011.

== Teams ==
Skip	Vice	Second	Lead	Club
Michelle Englot	Lana Vey	Roberta Materi	Deanna Doig	Tartan Curling Club, Regina, Saskatchewan
Shalon Fleming	Michelle Dayman	Marsha Munro	Terri Hillier-McIntosh	Highland Curling Club, Regina, Saskatchewan
Susan Lang	Linda Burnham	Donna Ell	Pat Bell	Callie Curling Club, Regina, Saskatchewan
Sherrilee Orsted	Candace Newkirk	Stephanie Barnstable	Kristen Schlamp	Estevan Curling Club, Estevan, Saskatchewan
Chelsey Peterson	Jayda Ivan	Leah Mihalicz	Stephanie Gress	Callie Curling Club, Regina, Saskatchewan
Cindy Ricci	Jolene Campbell	Natalie Bloomfield	Kristy Johnson	Lampman Curling Club, Lampman, Saskatchewan
Mandy Selzer	Larissa Murray	Kristen Mitchell	Megan Selzer	Balgonie Curling Club, Balgonie, Saskatchewan
Samantha Yachiw	Cathy Inglis	Colleen Ackerman	Sarah Slywka	Tartan Curling Club, Regina, Saskatchewan

== Results ==
=== A Event ===
Round of 16

Quarterfinals
A1	Yachiw	8
A1	Fleming	7
A2	Orsted	2
A2	Englot	10
A3	Ricci	7
A3	Lang	8
A4	Peterson	3
A4	Selzer	8

Semifinals
A1	Yachiw	3
A2	Englot	6
A3	Lang	1
A4	Selzer	10

A Qualifier
A5	Englot	10
A6	Selzer	2

=== B Event ===
Round of 16
Fleming	3
Orsted	10
Ricci	10
Peterson	0

Quarterfinals
A6	Lang	8
B1	Orsted	7
A5	Yachiw	3
B2	Ricci	8

Semifinals
B3	Lang	2
B4	Ricci	7

B Qualifier
A7	Selzer	4
B5	Ricci	6

=== C event ===
Quarterfinals	Semifinals			C1 Qualifier
	B1	Fleming	4
	B4	Yachiw	11
				B5	Lang	7
				C1	Yachiw	12

Quarterfinals	Semifinals			C2 Qualifier
	B2	Peterson	8
	B3	Orsted	6
				B6	Selzer	13
				C2	Peterson	4
