= 1999 Saskatchewan Scott Tournament of Hearts =

The 1999 Saskatchewan Scott Tournament of Hearts women's provincial curling championship, was held January 27–31 at the Weyburn Colosseum in Weyburn, Saskatchewan. The winning team of Cindy Street, represented Saskatchewan at the 1999 Scott Tournament of Hearts in Charlottetown, Prince Edward Island, where the team finished round robin with a 7-4 record, before losing the 3-4 game to Team Canada's Cathy Borst. This was also the last provincial tournament appearance for former Canadian, World and Olympic Champion Sandra Schmirler, who died in 2000 from cancer.

== Teams ==
Skip	Vice	Second	Lead	Club
Sherry Anderson	Kim Hodson	Sandra Mulroney	Donna Gignac	Delisle Curling Club, Delisle
Laurie Ann Calcutt	Myrna Nielsen	Lynne Doll	Barb Woytas	Yorkton Curling Club, Yorkton
Atina Ford	Nancy Inglis	Cori Hoag	Susan Hoffart	Callie Curling Club, Regina
Michelle Ridgeway	Darlene Kidd	Roberta Moore	Lisa Lewis	Callie Curling Club, Regina
Patty Rocheleau	Angela Mossman	Colleen Gerling	Sherri Leonard	Granite Curling Club, Saskatoon
Sandra Schmirler	Jan Betker	Joan McCusker	Marcia Gudereit	Callie Curling Club, Regina
Cindy Street	Brandee Davis	Allison Tanner	Shannon Wilson	Moose Jaw Hillcrest, Moose Jaw
Debbie Thierman	Elaine McCloy	Linda Bjork	Donna Siegel	Prince Albert Curling Club, Prince Albert

== Standings ==
Skip	W	L
Sandra Schmirler	5	2
Cindy Street	5	2
Atina Ford	5	2
Sherry Anderson	4	3
Patty Rocheleau	4	3
Michelle Ridgway	2	5
Laurie Ann Calcutt	2	5
Debbie Thierman	1	6

== Results ==
=== Draw 1 ===
January 27, 7:00 PM CT

Sheet A	1	2	3	4	5	6	7	8	9	10	Final
Thierman	2	0	1	0	1	0	0	0	1	0	5
Ridgway	0	0	0	2	0	1	1	1	0	1	6

Sheet B	1	2	3	4	5	6	7	8	9	10	Final
Anderson	0	2	0	2	0	1	0	2	0	1	8
Street	0	0	1	0	1	0	2	0	2	0	6

Sheet C	1	2	3	4	5	6	7	8	9	10	Final
Calcutt	0	2	0	0	0	0	0	X	X	X	2
Schmirler	2	0	2	3	0	1	2	X	X	X	10

Sheet D	1	2	3	4	5	6	7	8	9	10	Final
Ford	0	2	0	1	0	1	0	1	0	X	5
Rocheleau	0	0	2	0	2	0	4	0	2	X	10

=== Draw 2 ===
January 28, 9:30 AM CT

Sheet A	1	2	3	4	5	6	7	8	9	10	Final
Rocheleau	0	2	1	0	2	2	0	2	X	X	9
Calcutt	0	0	0	1	0	0	1	0	X	X	2

Sheet B	1	2	3	4	5	6	7	8	9	10	Final
Schmirler	1	1	0	0	0	0	2	2	0	X	6
Ford	0	0	0	0	1	2	0	0	1	X	4

Sheet C	1	2	3	4	5	6	7	8	9	10	Final
Anderson	0	0	0	0	1	4	2	1	X	X	8
Ridgway	0	1	0	1	0	0	0	0	X	X	2

Sheet D	1	2	3	4	5	6	7	8	9	10	Final
Street	0	1	1	0	0	0	1	0	1	1	5
Thierman	0	0	0	1	0	2	0	1	0	0	4

=== Draw 3 ===
January 28, 2:00 PM CT

Sheet A	1	2	3	4	5	6	7	8	9	10	Final
Anderson	1	0	2	0	1	0	2	0	1	X	8
Thierman	0	2	0	0	0	3	0	1	0	X	6

Sheet B	1	2	3	4	5	6	7	8	9	10	Final
Street	2	0	2	0	1	2	0	1	0	X	8
Ridgway	0	1	0	2	0	0	2	0	1	X	6

Sheet C	1	2	3	4	5	6	7	8	9	10	Final
Schmirler	3	1	0	0	1	0	0	2	0	X	7
Rocheleau	0	0	0	1	0	2	0	0	0	X	3

Sheet D	1	2	3	4	5	6	7	8	9	10	11	Final
Calcutt	0	1	0	0	0	3	0	1	0	2	0	7
Ford	0	0	0	0	3	0	2	0	2	0	1	8

=== Draw 4 ===
January 29, 9:30 AM CT

Sheet A	1	2	3	4	5	6	7	8	9	10	Final
Ridgway	0	0	1	0	4	4	2	X	X	X	10
Rocheleau	0	1	0	2	0	0	0	X	X	X	3

Sheet B	1	2	3	4	5	6	7	8	9	10	Final
Calcutt	0	0	0	1	0	0	1	0	X	X	2
Anderson	0	2	1	0	2	2	0	0	X	X	7

Sheet C	1	2	3	4	5	6	7	8	9	10	Final
Ford	1	0	2	0	0	0	0	2	0	1	6
Street	0	1	0	1	1	1	0	0	1	0	5

Sheet D	1	2	3	4	5	6	7	8	9	10	Final
Thierman	0	2	0	1	2	0	1	0	0	X	6
Schmirler	1	0	1	0	0	1	0	1	1	X	5

=== Draw 5 ===
January 29, 2:00 PM CT

Sheet A	1	2	3	4	5	6	7	8	9	10	11	Final
Street	0	0	1	0	0	4	0	0	0	0	1	6
Schmirler	0	0	0	0	2	0	1	1	0	1	0	5

Sheet B	1	2	3	4	5	6	7	8	9	10	11	Final
Ford	0	0	3	0	1	0	1	0	0	0	1	6
Thierman	0	0	0	1	0	1	0	1	1	1	0	5

Sheet C	1	2	3	4	5	6	7	8	9	10	Final
Rocheleau	2	1	0	3	0	2	1	X	X	X	9
Anderson	0	0	1	0	1	0	0	X	X	X	2

Sheet D	1	2	3	4	5	6	7	8	9	10	Final
Ridgway	0	0	0	3	1	0	0	1	0	X	5
Calcutt	1	3	1	0	0	1	2	0	1	X	9

=== Draw 6 ===
January 29, 7:00 PM CT

Sheet A	1	2	3	4	5	6	7	8	9	10	Final
Ford	0	0	1	0	2	0	1	4	X	X	8
Anderson	0	0	0	1	0	2	0	0	X	X	3

Sheet B	1	2	3	4	5	6	7	8	9	10	Final
Ridgway	0	0	1	0	0	2	0	X	X	X	3
Schmirler	0	2	0	3	1	0	2	X	X	X	8

Sheet C	1	2	3	4	5	6	7	8	9	10	Final
Thierman	0	0	0	1	0	1	2	0	2	X	6
Calcutt	0	2	2	0	1	0	0	3	0	X	8

Sheet D	1	2	3	4	5	6	7	8	9	10	Final
Rocheleau	0	1	0	1	2	0	1	0	1	0	6
Street	0	0	2	0	0	1	0	1	0	3	7

=== Draw 7 ===
January 30, 9:30 AM CT

Sheet A	1	2	3	4	5	6	7	8	9	10	Final
Calcutt	2	0	0	0	2	0	0	1	0	X	5
Street	0	0	0	1	0	5	0	0	1	X	7

Sheet B	1	2	3	4	5	6	7	8	9	10	Final
Thierman	1	0	3	0	1	0	2	0	1	0	8
Rocheleau	0	4	0	1	0	2	0	2	0	1	10

Sheet C	1	2	3	4	5	6	7	8	9	10	Final
Ridgway	1	0	0	0	1	0	1	1	0	X	4
Ford	0	1	0	1	0	3	0	0	1	X	6

Sheet D	1	2	3	4	5	6	7	8	9	10	Final
Schmirler	3	1	3	0	0	2	0	X	X	X	9
Anderson	0	0	0	2	0	0	1	X	X	X	3

== Playoffs ==
Semifinal			Final
			1	Sandra Schmirler	6
2	Cindy Street	8	2	Cindy Street	7
3	Atina Ford	7

=== Semifinal ===
January 30, 7:00 PM CT

Sheet A	1	2	3	4	5	6	7	8	9	10	Final
Street	0	0	2	1	0	2	0	2	0	1	8
Ford	0	1	0	0	4	0	2	0	0	0	7

=== Final ===
January 31, 2:00 PM CT

Sheet A	1	2	3	4	5	6	7	8	9	10	11	Final
Schmirler	0	1	0	1	0	0	0	3	0	1	0	6
Street	0	0	0	0	1	0	3	0	2	0	1	7
