= 2007 Saskatchewan Scotties Tournament of Hearts =

The 2007 Saskatchewan Scotties Tournament of Hearts women's provincial curling championship, was held January 31 to February 4 at the Balgonie Curling Club in Balgonie, Saskatchewan. The winning team of Jan Betker, represented Saskatchewan at the 2007 Scotties Tournament of Hearts in Lethbridge, Alberta, where they finished round robin with a 9–2 record, before losing the final to the defending champion, Team Canada, Kelly Scott

== Teams ==
Skip	Vice	Second	Lead	Club
Jan Betker	Lana Vey	Nancy Inglis	Marcia Gudereit	Callie Curling Club, Regina
Michelle Englot	Darlene Kidd	Roberta Materi	Cindy Simmons	Tartan Curling Club, Regina
Stefanie Lawton	Marliese Kasner	Sherri Singler	Chelsey Bell	CN Curling Club, Saskatoon
Jolene McIvor	Sherry Linton	Allison Slupski	Michelle McIvor	Callie Curling Club, Regina
Rene Miettinen	Maegan Clark	Allison Gerhardt	Barb Sharp	Muenster Curling Club, Meunster
Tracy Streifel	Ros Tanner	Kristen Ridalls	Andrea Rudulier	Granite Curling Club, Saskatoon
Wendy Thienes	Sheri Nixon	Bobbi Fuller	Pam Humphrey	Shaunavon Curling Club, Shaunavon
Cathy Trowell	Myrna Nielsen	Denise Hersikorn	Lynn Doll	Yorkton Curling Club, Yorkton

== Standings ==
Skip	W	L
Jan Betker	6	1
Stefanie Lawton	5	2
Michelle Englot	5	2
Cathy Trowell	3	4
Jolene McIvor	3	4
Rene Miettinen	3	4
Tracy Streifel	3	4
Wendy Thienes	0	7

== Results ==
=== Draw 1 ===
January 31, 7:00 PM CT

Sheet A	1	2	3	4	5	6	7	8	9	10	Final
Trowell	0	0	3	0	0	0	3	0	3	X	9
Thirnes	1	0	0	1	1	1	0	2	0	X	6

Sheet B	1	2	3	4	5	6	7	8	9	10	Final
McIvor	0	0	0	2	0	0	1	0	0	0	3
Lawton	0	0	1	0	1	1	0	1	0	1	5

Sheet C	1	2	3	4	5	6	7	8	9	10	Final
Betker	0	1	0	0	1	2	0	1	0	X	5
Streifel	0	0	0	1	0	0	2	0	1	X	4

Sheet D	1	2	3	4	5	6	7	8	9	10	11	Final
Miettinen	0	1	0	0	4	0	0	0	1	1	0	7
Englot	1	0	1	2	0	1	1	1	0	0	6	13

=== Draw 2 ===
February 1, 9:30 AM CT

Sheet A	1	2	3	4	5	6	7	8	9	10	Final
Lawton	1	0	1	0	3	1	0	0	1	X	7
Englot	0	1	0	1	0	0	1	1	0	X	4

Sheet B	1	2	3	4	5	6	7	8	9	10	Final
Betker	0	0	2	0	4	0	1	0	3	X	10
Trowell	0	0	0	1	0	2	0	1	0	X	4

Sheet C	1	2	3	4	5	6	7	8	9	10	Final
Thienes	2	0	0	0	1	0	0	0	1	X	4
Miettinen	0	3	1	2	0	2	0	1	0	X	9

Sheet D	1	2	3	4	5	6	7	8	9	10	Final
Streifel	0	1	0	3	0	0	1	0	1	1	7
McIvor	0	0	1	0	2	1	0	2	0	0	6

=== Draw 3 ===
February 1, 2:00 PM CT

Sheet A	1	2	3	4	5	6	7	8	9	10	Final
Miettinen	0	1	0	0	3	1	0	3	X	X	8
Trowell	0	0	0	0	0	0	1	0	X	X	1

Sheet B	1	2	3	4	5	6	7	8	9	10	Final
Lawton	1	0	1	0	1	1	0	0	2	X	6
Streifel	0	1	0	1	0	0	0	0	0	X	2

Sheet C	1	2	3	4	5	6	7	8	9	10	11	Final
McIvor	0	3	0	3	0	1	0	0	0	1	0	8
Englot	0	0	2	0	2	0	1	1	2	0	3	11

Sheet D	1	2	3	4	5	6	7	8	9	10	Final
Betker	2	3	0	2	0	4	X	X	X	X	11
Thienes	0	0	1	0	1	0	X	X	X	X	2

=== Draw 4 ===
February 2, 9:30 AM CT

Sheet A	1	2	3	4	5	6	7	8	9	10	Final
McIvor	0	2	0	3	0	0	0	0	2	0	7
Betker	1	0	3	0	0	2	1	1	0	1	9

Sheet B	1	2	3	4	5	6	7	8	9	10	Final
Englot	3	0	2	0	0	2	0	0	2	X	9
Thienes	0	2	0	1	0	0	1	1	0	X	5

Sheet C	1	2	3	4	5	6	7	8	9	10	Final
Miettinen	1	0	1	1	0	1	0	0	2	0	6
Lawton	0	1	0	0	3	0	2	1	0	1	8

Sheet D	1	2	3	4	5	6	7	8	9	10	Final
Trowell	0	2	0	0	1	0	1	2	0	1	7
Streifel	0	0	1	0	0	3	0	0	2	0	6

=== Draw 5 ===
February 2, 2:00 PM CT

Sheet A	1	2	3	4	5	6	7	8	9	10	Final
Englot	2	0	0	0	3	1	0	0	1	2	9
Streifel	0	1	1	0	0	0	2	1	0	0	5

Sheet B	1	2	3	4	5	6	7	8	9	10	Final
Miettinen	3	0	1	0	2	0	1	0	3	X	10
Betker	0	1	0	1	0	1	0	1	0	X	4

Sheet C	1	2	3	4	5	6	7	8	9	10	Final
Trowell	0	0	1	0	1	0	1	0	X	X	3
McIvor	1	0	0	2	0	1	0	5	X	X	9

Sheet D	1	2	3	4	5	6	7	8	9	10	Final
Thienes	0	1	0	0	0	0	X	X	X	X	1
Lawton	0	0	2	2	2	3	X	X	X	X	9

=== Draw 6 ===
February 2, 7:00 PM CT

Sheet A	1	2	3	4	5	6	7	8	9	10	Final
Betker	0	1	0	1	1	0	3	1	0	X	7
Lawton	0	0	1	0	0	1	0	0	2	X	4

Sheet B	1	2	3	4	5	6	7	8	9	10	Final
Trowell	1	0	0	0	1	0	1	0	0	X	3
Englot	0	0	1	2	0	1	0	4	4	X	12

Sheet C	1	2	3	4	5	6	7	8	9	10	Final
Streifel	2	1	2	1	0	3	1	1	X	X	11
Thienes	0	0	0	0	2	0	0	0	X	X	2

Sheet D	1	2	3	4	5	6	7	8	9	10	11	Final
McIvor	0	0	0	1	0	2	2	1	0	2	2	10
Miettinen	0	1	4	0	1	0	0	0	2	0	0	8

=== Draw 7 ===
February 3, 9:30 AM CT

Sheet A	1	2	3	4	5	6	7	8	9	10	Final
Streifel	2	0	0	1	0	1	0	0	2	2	8
Miettinen	0	1	0	0	1	0	3	1	0	0	6

Sheet B	1	2	3	4	5	6	7	8	9	10	Final
Thienes	0	0	0	0	0	0	X	X	X	X	0
McIvor	2	2	2	1	3	2	X	X	X	X	12

Sheet C	1	2	3	4	5	6	7	8	9	10	Final
Englot	0	0	2	0	0	1	0	0	1	2	6
Betker	0	1	0	2	1	0	1	2	0	0	7

Sheet D	1	2	3	4	5	6	7	8	9	10	Final
Lawton	0	2	0	2	0	1	0	0	0	X	5
Trowell	0	0	1	0	3	0	2	1	1	X	8

== Playoffs ==
Semifinal			Final
			1	Jan Betker	9
2	Stefanie Lawton	13	2	Stefanie Lawton	6
3	Michelle Englot	7

=== Semifinal ===
February 3, 7:00 PM CT

Sheet A	1	2	3	4	5	6	7	8	9	10	Final
Lawton	1	2	0	1	0	2	1	0	6	X	13
Englot	0	0	4	0	1	0	0	2	0	X	7

=== Final ===
February 4, 2:00 PM CT

Sheet A	1	2	3	4	5	6	7	8	9	10	Final
Betker	0	2	0	2	0	1	0	2	1	1	9
Lawton	0	0	2	0	3	0	1	0	0	0	6
