= Bunge Prairie Pinnacle =

Annual women's curling championship

- Sponsor: Bunge
- Established: 1948; 78 years ago
- 2026 host city: Melville, Saskatchewan
- 2026 arena: CN Community Centre
- 2026 champion: Jolene Campbell

Current edition
- 2026 Bunge Prairie Pinnacle

The Bunge Prairie Pinnacle, formerly the Viterra Prairie Pinnacle and Saskatchewan Scotties Tournament of Hearts is the annual provincial women's curling championship for the Canadian province of Saskatchewan. The winning team represents Saskatchewan at the Scotties Tournament of Hearts, the national women's championship. The bonspiel is organized by CURLSASK, the provincial curling association.

== Format ==
The number of teams participating and the format of the tournament has varied over the years. In the most recent edition, in 2025, the bonspiel included 9 teams involved in a single round-robin leading to a four-team page playoff. Three teams qualified based on their national CTRS ranking; another three qualified based on their rank on the Saskatchewan Women's Curling Tour (SWCT); and the final three teams qualified via direct events, called the Women's Last Chance.

== Champions ==
The championship has been contested annually since 1948, with the event cancelled only once, in 2021, due to the COVID-19 pandemic.

In 1953, the Janet Perkin rink from Regina won the provincial title and the Western Canadian Ladies' Championship, the first organized competition for women that went beyond the province's borders, and which was hosted in Regina. Saskatoon's Joyce McKee established an early run of dominance in the province, winning a record eight titles between 1954 and 1973, including five as skip. McKee won the first invitational national title in 1960 and the first official Canadian women's championship the following year, capturing the 1961 Diamond D Championship. She won another national title in 1969 before teaming up with Vera Pezer for a then-record three consecutive provincial and national titles from 1971 to 1973, including the 1972 Macdonald Lassies Championship in Saskatoon. Pezer's three straight titles were part of a run of six straight for Team Saskatchewan. In 2019, the Pezer rink would be ranked fifth in a national ranking of the greatest women's curling teams. The top-ranked team was Sandra Schmirler's Regina rink, which won three provincial, national, and world titles in the 1990s, along with a gold medal at the 1998 Winter Olympics. Other Saskatchewan champions who went on to secure national titles include Dorenda Schoenhals, Emily Farnham, Marj Mitchell—whose rink also won Canada's first women's world championship in 1980—and Amber Holland. Sherry Anderson has won seven provincial titles, matching McKee's mark of five wins as a skip, with her first win coming in 1994 and her last in 2018. Although Anderson has not won a national Tournament of Hearts, her rink did capture a record five straight Canadian senior championships between 2017 and 2022, and world seniors titles in 2018, 2019, and 2023. The most recent provincial champion is Nancy Martin, whose rink won its first title at the 2025 Viterra Prairie Pinnacle.

=== List of champions ===
Teams in bold denote national championships. Western Canada champions (1953–1960) in italics.

Year	Host	Skip	Third	Second	Lead	Winning club
2026	Melville	Jolene Campbell	Robyn Silvernagle	Rachel Big Eagle	Dayna Demmans	Highland Curling Club
2025	Kindersley	Nancy Martin	Chaelynn Stewart	Kadriana Lott	Deanna Doig	Nutana Curling Club
2024	Tisdale	Skylar Ackerman	Ashley Thevenot	Taylor Stremick	Kaylin Skinner	Nutana Curling Club
2023	Estevan	Robyn Silvernagle	Kelly Schafer	Sherry Just	Kara Thevenot	Twin Rivers Curling Club
2022	Assiniboia	Penny Barker	Christie Gamble	Jenna Enge	Danielle Sicinski	Moose Jaw Ford Curling Centre
2021	N/A	Cancelled due to the COVID-19 pandemic in Saskatchewan. Team Sherry Anderson (Anderson, Nancy Martin, Chaelynn Kitz, Breanne Knapp) invited to represent Saskatchewan at Scotties.				
2020	Melville	Robyn Silvernagle	Stefanie Lawton	Jessie Hunkin	Kara Thevenot	Twin Rivers Curling Club
2019	Humboldt	Robyn Silvernagle	Stefanie Lawton	Jessie Hunkin	Kara Thevenot	Twin Rivers Curling Club
2018	Melfort	Sherry Anderson	Kourtney Fesser	Krista Fesser	Karlee Korchinski	Nutana Curling Club
2017	Melville	Penny Barker	Deanna Doig	Lorraine Schneider	Danielle Sicinski	Moose Jaw Ford Curling Centre
2016	Prince Albert	Jolene Campbell	Ashley Howard	Callan Hamon	Ashley Williamson	Highland Curling Club
2015	Assiniboia	Stefanie Lawton	Sherry Anderson	Stephanie Schmidt	Marliese Kasner	Nutana Curling Club
2014	Tisdale	Stefanie Lawton	Sherry Anderson	Sherri Singler	Marliese Kasner	Nutana Curling Club
2013	Balgonie	Jill Shumay	Kara Johnston	Taryn Holtby	Jinaye Ayrey	Maidstone Curling Club
2012	Humboldt	Michelle Englot	Lana Vey	Roberta Materi	Sarah Slywka	Tartan Curling Club
2011	Outlook	**Amber Holland**	**Kim Schneider**	**Tammy Schneider**	**Heather Kalenchuk**	**Kronau Curling Club**
2010	Kindersley	Amber Holland	Kim Schneider	Tammy Schneider	Heather Kalenchuk	Kronau Curling Club
2009	Swift Current	Stefanie Lawton	Marliese Kasner	Sherri Singler	Lana Vey	CN Curling Club
2008	North Battleford	Michelle Englot	Darlene Kidd	Roberta Materi	Cindy Simmons	Tartan Curling Club
2007	Balgonie	Jan Betker	Lana Vey	Nancy Inglis	Marcia Gudereit	Caledonian Curling Club
2006	Yorkton	Tracy Streifel	Ros Tanner	Kristen Ridalls	Andrea Rudulier	Granite Curling Club
2005	Assiniboia	Stefanie Lawton	Marliese Miller	Sherri Singler	Chelsey Bell	CN Curling Club
2004	Meadow Lake	Sherry Anderson	Kim Hodson	Sandra Mulroney	Donna Gignac	Delisle
2003	Balgonie	Jan Betker	Sherry Linton	Joan McCusker	Marcia Gudereit	Caledonian Curling Club
2002	Melfort	Sherry Anderson	Kim Hodson	Sandra Mulroney	Donna Gignac	Delisle
2001	Estevan	Michelle Ridgway	Lori Kehler	Roberta Materi	Joan Stricker	Caledonian Curling Club
2000	Humboldt	June Campbell	Cathy Walter	Karen Daku	Leanne Whitrow	Caledonian Curling Club
1999	Weyburn	Cindy Street	Brandee Davis	Allison Tanner	Shannon Wilson	Moose Jaw
1998	Rosetown	Cathy Trowell	Kristy Lewis	Daren Daku	Kery-Lynn Schikowski	Caledonian Curling Club
**1997**	Swift Current	**Sandra Schmirler**	**Jan Betker**	**Joan McCusker**	**Marcia Gudereit**	**Caledonian Curling Club**
1996	Tisdale	Sherry Scheirich	Colleen Zielke	Sandra Mulroney	Judy Leonard	Granite Curling Club
1995	Regina	Sherry Anderson	Kay Montgomery	Donna Gignac	Elaine McCloy	Prince Albert
1994	Wadena	Sherry Anderson	Kay Montgomery	Donna Gignac	Elaine McCloy	Prince Albert
1993	Shaunavon	**Sandra Peterson**	**Jan Betker**	**Joan McCusker**	**Marcia Gudereit**	**Caledonian Curling Club**
1992	Yorkton	Michelle Schneider	Kathy Fahlman	Joan Stricker	Lorie Kehler	Tartan Curling Club
1991	Regina	Sandra Peterson	Jan Betker	Joan Inglis	Marcia Schiml	Caledonian Curling Club
1990	Humboldt	Michelle Schneider	Kathy Fahlman	Joan Stricker	Lorie Kehler	Tartan Curling Club
1989	Regina	Michelle Schneider	Joan Stricker	Lorie Kehler	Leanne Eberle	Tartan Curling Club
1988	Weyburn	Michelle Schneider	Jan Herauf	Lorie Kehler	Leanne Eberle	Tartan Curling Club
1987	Nipawin	Kathy Fahlman	Sandra Schmirler	Jan Betker	Sheila Schneider	Tartan Curling Club
1986	Regina	Lori McGeary	Gillian Thompson	Christine Gervais	Sheila Kavanagh	Hub City Curling Club
1985	Tisdale	Sheila Rowan	Jean MacLean	Maureen Burkitt	Eileen Wilson	Nutana Curling Club
1984	Swift Current	Lori McGeary	Gillian Thompson	Christine Gervais	Allison Earl	Sutherland Curling Club
1983	Saskatoon	Sheila Rowan	Jean MacLean	Judy Sefton	Lillian Martin	Nutana Curling Club
1982	Melville	Arleen Day	Shirley McKendry	Velva Squire	Dorthy Hepper	Caledonian Curling Club
1981	Prince Albert	Susan Altman	Gloria Leach	Delores Syrota	Joan Sweatman	Wadena
1980	Estevan	**Marj Mitchell**	**Nancy Kerr**	**Shirley McKendry**	**Wendy Leach**	**Caledonian Curling Club**
1979	Melfort	Barb Despins	Lynne Fuller	Elaine Farkas	Diane Lynn	Granite Curling Club
1978	Moose Jaw	Charlene Goodwin	Holly Webster	Nancy Bint	Betty Fairweather	Hub City Curling Club
1977	North Battleford	Crystal Brunas	Bonnie Brandon	Pamela Ochitawa	Sharon Kvinlaug	Prince Albert
1976	Weyburn	Delores Miller	Gaby Kot	Margaret Woodard	Jean Lowenberger	Weyburn
1975	Yorkton	Marj Mitchell	Kendra Richards	Nancy Kerr	Florence Sanna	Caledonian Curling Club
1974	Regina	**Emily Farnham**	**Linda Saunders**	**Pat McBeath**	**Donna Collins**	**Nutana Curling Club**
1973	Saskatoon	**Vera Pezer**	**Sheila Rowan**	**Joyce McKee**	**Lee Morrison**	**Sutherland Curling Club**
1972	Esterhazy	**Vera Pezer**	**Sheila Rowan**	**Joyce McKee**	**Lee Morrison**	**Sutherland Curling Club**
1971	Tisdale	**Vera Pezer**	**Sheila Rowan**	**Joyce McKee**	**Lee Morrison**	**Sutherland Curling Club**
1970	Swift Current	**Dorenda Schoenhals**	**Cheryl Stirton**	**Linda Burhnam**	**Joan Andersen**	**Nutana Curling Club**
1969	Nipawin	**Joyce McKee**	**Vera Pezer**	**Lenore Morrison**	**Jennifer Falk**	**Hub City Curling Club**
1968	Estevan	Barbara MacNevin	Fay Coben	Florence Hill	Avis Carr	Delisle
1967	Prince Albert	Betty Clarke	Enid Anderson	Jean Broeder	Beverly Langton	Caledonian Curling Club
1966	Moose Jaw	Barbara MacNevin	Fay Coben	Florence Hill	Avis Carr	Delisle
1965	Melfort	Barbara MacNevin	Fay Coben	Florence Hill	Avis Carr	Delisle
1964	Weyburn	Janet Perkin	Kay Krug	Joyce Miller	Doreen Thomas	Caledonian Curling Club
1963	Saskatoon	Mildred Binner	Velma Starrak	Peggy Johnson	Jean Balderston	Moose Jaw
1962	Yorkton	Joyce McKee	Sylvia Fedoruk	Barbara MacNevin	Rosa McFee	Hub City Curling Club
1961	North Battleford	**Joyce McKee**	**Sylvia Fedoruk**	**Barbara MacNevin**	**Rosa McFee**	**Hub City Curling Club**
1960	Regina	**Joyce McKee**	**Sylvia Fedoruk**	**Donna Belding**	**Muriel Coben**	Hub City Curling Club
1959	Prince Albert	Janet Perkin	Win Rodger	Joyce Miller	Betty Malesh	Caledonian Curling Club
1958	Swift Current	Donna Mathews	Ella Baker	Alice Park	Rita Davidson	Yorkton
1957	Saskatoon	Phyllis Baldwin	Y. Lindberg	E. Schwanbeck	D. England	Bradwell
1956	Estevan	Hazel Grigg (Note: Team was skipped by Grigg, but Binnie threw fourth stones.)	Millie Binnie	Dot Crippen	Elsie Paterson	Moose Jaw
1955	Melfort	Marj Olson	Isobel Hill	Mary Reed	Flo Jackson	Prince Albert
1954	Yorkton & Regina	Joyce McKee	Muriel Coben	Maizie Johnston	Vi Nesbitt	Hub City Curling Club
1953	North Battleford	Janet Perkin	Phyllis Day	Jean Graham	Joyce Miller	Caledonian Curling Club
1952	Weyburn	Maybell Spooner	Eileen Sexsmith	Philllis Barclay	Merle Dertell	Nutana Curling Club
1951	Prince Albert	Marj Olson	B. McQuarrie	S. Johnstone	J. Jackson	Prince Albert
1950	Moose Jaw	Margaret Walker	Dot Bell	C. Jones	S. Cavil	Granite Curling Club
1949	Saskatoon	Bessie McDonald	Fern Braithwaite	Jean Graham	Gertrude Millar	Granite Curling Club
1948	Regina	J. Roberston	Laura Kunkel	Isabelle Sekulich	Kay Sekulich	Davidson

== See also ==
- SaskTel Tankard
- List of curling clubs in Saskatchewan
