= Caledonian Curling Club =

Curling rink in Canada

Caledonian Curling Club The Callie
- Location: 2225 Sandra Schmirler Way; Regina, Saskatchewan; S4W 1B6

Information
- Established: 1915; 111 years ago
- Club type: Dedicated ice
- Curling Canada region: SCA Regina
- Sheets of ice: Twelve
- Rock colours: Red and yellow
- Website: http://www.callieclub.com/

The Caledonian Curling Club, also known as the Callie, is a curling club located in Regina, Saskatchewan, Canada. Established in 1915, the club is among the oldest in the province and has been the home of many championship teams, including the Sandra Schmirler rink, which won three provincial, national, and world championships in the 1990s and the gold medal at the 1998 Winter Olympics.

The Callie merged with the Tartan Curling Club in 2018, leaving it as one of two clubs in Regina, alongside the Highland Curling Club.

== History ==
On 7 October 1915, curlers gathered in Slater and Finlayson's store to discuss prospects for the formation of a second curling club in Regina; it was agreed that a second club would prove beneficial to the interests of curling in the city, and that the additional rink would provide better accommodation for the provincial bonspiel. The club was officially established on 14 October 1915, when it was christened the Caledonian Curling Club of Regina. C. J. Watson, who had chaired the meetings, was named the first president of the club.

The club was originally situated on the Regina Fair Grounds, moving between various buildings before settling in the Grain Show Building by 1933. In November 1978, the club moved to its current location next to the Regina International Airport.

In 2015, the club marked its 100th anniversary with a multi-day 100-end curling match.

In 2018, the Callie absorbed the former Tartan Curling Club when it closed.

In 2023, the Callie began hosting the Queen City Curling League, the province's second LGBT curling league after the Prairie Lily Curling League was established at Saskatoon's Nutana Curling Club in 2014.

=== Champions ===
The Callie is noted for being the home of Sandra Schmirler's world championship team. Schmirler, along with third Jan Betker, second Joan McCusker, and lead Marcia Gudereit, won three national and World Championships in the 1990s before winning the first Olympic gold medal in women's curling in 1998. In 2019, the team was voted first in a national ranking of the best ever women's curling teams. After Schmirler died in 2000, Betker skipped two more provincial championship teams.

Long before the Schmirler team's success, the Callie produced the first women's team to win an inter-provincial competition when Janet Perkin's rink won the 1953 Western Canadian Ladies' Championship, which was hosted in Regina. In 1980, Marj Mitchell's team won Canada's first Women's World Championship in the second ever edition of the event in Perth, Scotland. In 1990, the Atina Ford rink won the Canadian Junior Championship, while Nancy Kerr's team won the 2003 Canadian and World Seniors titles. Overall, the Callie has been the home of fifteen women's provincial champions.

On the men's side, the Callie has been home to four Canadian Junior Champions, as well as the 2005 World Junior Champion Kyle George rink. In 1998, Gary Bryden's rink won the Canadian Senior Championship. Altogether, Caledonian rinks have claimed six men's provincial championships.

The club also secured a Canadian Mixed Curling title in 1996, with Randy Bryden's rink, featuring brother Russ and sisters Cathy Trowell (Inglis) and Karen Inglis, winning the championship.

Major titles by Callie rinks
Year	Event	Skip	Third	Second	Lead	Nationals record
2024	Canadian Senior Curling Championship	Randy Bryden	Troy Robinson	Russ Bryden	Chris Semenchuck	10–2
2013	SaskTel Tankard	Brock Virtue	Braeden Moskowy	Chris Schille	D. J. Kidby	5–6
2011	Canadian Junior Curling Championship	Braeden Moskowy	Kirk Muyres	Colton Flasch	Matt Lang	13–0
2007	Saskatchewan Scotties Tournament of Hearts	Jan Betker	Lana Vey	Nancy Inglis	Marcia Gudereit	10–3
2005	Canadian Junior Curling Championship; World Junior Curling Championship	Kyle George	Justin Mihalicz	D. J. Kidby	Chris Hebert	11–2
2003	Canadian Senior Curling Championship; World Senior Curling Championship	Nancy Kerr	Linda Burnham	Kenda Richards	Gertie Pick	11–2
2003	Saskatchewan Scott Tournament of Hearts	Jan Betker	Sherry Linton	Joan McCusker	Marcia Gudereit	7–5
2002	Saskatchewan Wheat Pool Tankard	Scott Bitz	Mark Lang	Brian McCusker	Kelly Moskowy	7–5
2001	Saskatchewan Scott Tournament of Hearts	Michelle Ridgway	Lorie Kehler	Roberta Materi	Joan Stricker	4–7
2000	Saskatchewan Scott Tournament of Hearts	June Campbell	Cathy Walter	Karen Daku	Leanne Whitrow	8–4
1998	Winter Olympics	Sandra Schmirler	Jan Betker	Joan McCusker	Marcia Gudereit	—
1998	Saskatchewan Scott Tournament of Hearts	Cathy Trowell	Kristy Lewis	Karen Daku	Keri-Lynn Schikowski	6–6
1998	Canadian Senior Curling Championship	Gary Bryden	Dale Graham	Wilf Foss	Jerry Zimmer	10–2
1997	Saskatchewan Scott Tournament of Hearts; Scott Tournament of Hearts; World Women's Curling Championship	Sandra Schmirler	Jan Betker	Joan McCusker	Marcia Gudereit	11–2
1996	Canadian Mixed Curling Championship	Randy Bryden	Cathy Trowell	Russ Bryden	Karen Inglis	11–3
1994	Scott Tournament of Hearts; World Women's Curling Championship	Sandra Peterson	Jan Betker	Joan McCusker	Marcia Gudereit	11–1
1993	Saskatchewan Scott Tournament of Hearts; Scott Tournament of Hearts; World Women's Curling Championship	Sandra Peterson	Jan Betker	Joan McCusker	Marcia Gudereit	10–2
1992	Labatt Tankard	Brad Hebert	Warren Sharp	Bob Novakowski	Kerry Gudereit	5–6
1991	Saskatchewan Scott Tournament of Hearts	Sandra Peterson	Jan Betker	Joan Inglis	Marcia Schiml	8–5
1990	Canadian Junior Curling Championship	Atina Ford	Darlene Kidd	Leslie Beck	Cindy Ford	10–2
1984	Labatt Tankard	Gary Bryden	Dale Graham	Wilf Foss	Jerry Zimmer	7–5
1982	Saskatchewan Scott Tournament of Hearts	Arleen Day	Shirley McKendry	Velva Squire	Dorthy Hepper	8–4
1980	Saskatchewan Scott Tournament of Hearts; Canadian Ladies Curling Association Championship; World Women's Curling Championship	Marj Mitchell	Nancy Kerr	Shirley McKendry	Wendy Leach	9–4
1977	Macdonald Tankard	Les Rogers	Greg Manwaring	Morris Tait	Vic Rogers	5–6
1975	Saskatchewan Lassies' Curling Championship	Marj Mitchell	Kenda Richards	Nancy Kerr	Florence Sanna	7–3
1967	Saskatchewan Ladies' Curling Championship	Betty Clarke	Enid Anderson	Jean Broeder	Beverly Langton	5–4
1964	Saskatchewan Ladies' Curling Championship	Janet Perkin	Kay Krug	Joyce Miller	Doreen Thomas	5–4
1959	Saskatchewan Ladies' Curling Championship	Janet Perkin	Win Rogers	Joyce Miller	B. Malesh	—
1956	National Schoolboys Championship	Bob Hawkins	Ted Clarke	Bruce Beveridge	Dave Williams	
1953	Saskatchewan Ladies' Curling Championship; Western Canadian Ladies' Championship	Janet Perkin	Phyllis Day	Jean Graham	Joyce Miller	3–1
1950	National Schoolboys Championship	Bill Clarke	Gary Carlson	Ian Innes	Harold Grassie	
1949	Macdonald Tankard	Harold Horeak	Edward Richter	John Heaney	Ernest Kittleson	4–5

== Tartan Curling Club merger ==
Tartan Curling Club
- Location: 1464 Broadway Avenue; Regina, Saskatchewan; S4P 1E2

Information
- Established: 1948
- Club type: Dedicated ice
- Closed: 2018
- Sheets of ice: Ten
- Rock colours: Red and blue

In 2018, the Callie absorbed the former Tartan Curling Club, which closed the doors at its Broadway Avenue location after 60 years of operating there. At the time of the closure, the two clubs proposed a merger to help stabilize curling in the city. The Tartan was founded in 1948 as the Civil Service Curling Club, which later merged with the Community Co-operative Curling Association and changed its name to the Tartan. The club opened a ten-sheet artificial ice rink in 1958. In 2003, the Tartan absorbed the Wheat City Curling Club upon its closure. The Tartan itself was the home of a number of provincial championship rinks, including Randy Woytowich's mixed rink that went undefeated en route to the 1984 Canadian Mixed Curling Championship.

Provincial titles by Tartan rinks
Year	Event	Skip	Third	Second	Lead	Nationals record
2012	Canadian Mixed Curling Championship	Jason Ackerman	Chantelle Eberle	Dean Hicke	Colleen Ackerman	11–4
2012	Saskatchewan Scotties Tournament of Hearts	Michelle Englot	Lana Vey	Roberta Materi	Sarah Slywka	5–6
2011	SaskTel Tankard	Steve Laycock	Pat Simmons	Brennen Jones	Dallan Muyres	4–7
2008	Saskatchewan Scotties Tournament of Hearts	Michelle Englot	Darlene Kidd	Roberta Materi	Cindy Simmons	5–6
1993	Labatt Tankard	Randy Woytowich	Brian McCusker	Wyatt Buck	John Grundy	6–5
1992	Saskatchewan Scott Tournament of Hearts	Michelle Schneider	Kathy Fahlman	Joan Stricker	Lorie Kehler	7–4
1991	Labatt Tankard	Randy Woytowich	Brian McCusker	Wyatt Buck	John Grundy	8–4
1990	Saskatchewan Scott Tournament of Hearts	Michelle Schneider	Kathy Fahlman	Joan Stricker	Lorie Kehler	6–5
1989	Saskatchewan Scott Tournament of Hearts	Michelle Schneider	Joan Stricker	Lorie Kehler	Leanne Eberle	8–5
1988	Saskatchewan Scott Tournament of Hearts	Michelle Schneider	Jan Herauf	Lorie Kehler	Leanne Eberle	9–3
1987	Saskatchewan Scott Tournament of Hearts	Kathy Fahlman	Sandra Schmirler	Jan Betker	Sheila Schneider	7–5
1984	Canadian Mixed Curling Championship	Randy Woytowich	Kathy Fahlman	Brian McCusker	Jan Betker	12–0

== See also ==
- List of curling clubs in Saskatchewan
