= 2006 Saskatchewan Scott Tournament of Hearts =

Provincial Championship

The 2006 Saskatchewan Scott Tournament of Hearts women's provincial curling championship, was held February 1–5 at the Gallagher Centre in Yorkton, Saskatchewan. The winning team of Tracey Streifel, represented Saskatchewan at the 2006 Scott Tournament of Hearts in London, Ontario, where the team finished round robin with a 2–9 record.

== Teams ==
Skip	Vice	Second	Lead	Club
Leah Birnie	Danette Tracey	Laurie Lund	Charla Moore	Weyburn Curling Club, Weyburn
Heather Burnett	Dawn Simpson	Tanya Becker	Kailena Bay	Martensville Curling Club, Martensville
Chantelle Eberle	Debbie Lozinski	Michelle Lemon	Meghan Sharp	Balgonie Curling Club, Balgonie
Stefanie Lawton	Marliese Kasner	Sherri Singler	Chelsey Bell	CN Curling Club, Saskatoon
Karen Purdy	Susan Lang	Barb Sharp	Patty Bell	Balgonie Curling Club, Balgonie
Tracy Streifel	Ros Tanner	Kristen Ridalls	Andrea Rudulier	Granite Curling Club, Saskatoon
Delores Syrota	Sylvia Broad	Gloria Leach	Trudy Halvorson	Wadena Curling Club, Wadena
Kathy Thiele	Lorie Kehler	Cathy Walter	Leanne Whitrow	Callie Curling Club, Regina

== Standings ==
Skip	W	L
Tracy Streifel	6	1
Stefanie Lawton	6	1
Delores Syrota	4	3
Leah Birnie	4	3
Chantelle Eberle	3	4
Karen Purdy	2	5
Heather Burnett	0	7

== Results ==
=== Draw 1 ===
February 1, 7:00 PM CT

Sheet A	1	2	3	4	5	6	7	8	9	10	Final
Purdy	0	2	0	1	1	0	2	1	0	X	7
Burnett	1	0	1	0	0	1	0	0	2	X	5

Sheet B	1	2	3	4	5	6	7	8	9	10	Final
Lawton	0	1	0	1	1	1	2	0	1	X	7
Thiele	0	0	1	0	0	0	0	1	0	X	2

Sheet C	1	2	3	4	5	6	7	8	9	10	Final
Streifel	1	0	2	0	0	1	0	2	2	2	10
Eberle	0	1	0	1	3	0	3	0	0	0	8

Sheet D	1	2	3	4	5	6	7	8	9	10	Final
Birnie	0	0	0	1	0	1	0	3	0	X	5
Syrota	0	0	0	0	0	0	1	0	2	X	3

=== Draw 2 ===
February 2, 9:30 AM CT

Sheet A	1	2	3	4	5	6	7	8	9	10	Final
Thiele	0	0	0	2	2	0	3	0	2	X	9
Syrota	0	1	1	0	0	3	0	1	0	X	6

Sheet B	1	2	3	4	5	6	7	8	9	10	11	Final
Streifel	1	0	1	0	0	0	0	1	0	0	3	6
Purdy	0	1	0	1	0	0	0	0	0	1	0	3

Sheet C	1	2	3	4	5	6	7	8	9	10	Final
Burnett	0	1	0	0	1	0	0	0	0	X	2
Birnie	0	0	1	1	0	3	0	1	1	X	7

Sheet D	1	2	3	4	5	6	7	8	9	10	Final
Eberle	0	0	0	0	2	0	1	1	1	0	5
Lawton	0	1	1	1	0	2	0	0	0	1	6

=== Draw 3 ===
February 2, 2:00 PM CT

Sheet A	1	2	3	4	5	6	7	8	9	10	Final
Birnie	2	0	1	0	1	0	3	0	0	0	7
Purdy	0	3	0	2	0	2	0	2	0	2	11

Sheet B	1	2	3	4	5	6	7	8	9	10	Final
Thiele	0	0	3	0	1	0	1	0	0	X	5
Eberle	2	1	0	2	0	3	0	1	1	X	10

Sheet C	1	2	3	4	5	6	7	8	9	10	Final
Lawton	0	3	0	0	2	0	2	1	0	X	8
Syrota	0	0	3	1	0	1	0	0	1	X	6

Sheet D	1	2	3	4	5	6	7	8	9	10	Final
Streifel	2	0	4	0	0	1	3	X	X	X	10
Burnett	0	1	0	1	1	0	0	X	X	X	3

=== Draw 4 ===
February 3, 9:30 AM CT

Sheet A	1	2	3	4	5	6	7	8	9	10	11	Final
Lawton	2	0	0	2	0	1	0	0	1	1	0	7
Streifel	0	0	1	0	2	0	3	1	0	0	1	8

Sheet B	1	2	3	4	5	6	7	8	9	10	Final
Syrota	3	2	1	2	0	2	X	X	X	X	10
Burnett	0	0	0	0	1	0	X	X	X	X	1

Sheet C	1	2	3	4	5	6	7	8	9	10	Final
Birnie	2	1	2	1	1	0	1	X	X	X	8
Thiele	0	0	0	0	0	1	0	X	X	X	1

Sheet D	1	2	3	4	5	6	7	8	9	10	Final
Purdy	1	1	0	0	2	0	1	0	1	0	6
Eberle	0	0	0	2	0	2	0	1	0	4	9

=== Draw 5 ===
February 3, 2:00 PM CT

Sheet A	1	2	3	4	5	6	7	8	9	10	Final
Syrota	0	1	0	0	0	2	0	1	0	1	5
Eberle	0	0	1	0	0	0	1	0	2	0	4

Sheet B	1	2	3	4	5	6	7	8	9	10	Final
Birnie	1	0	0	2	0	0	0	1	0	X	4
Streifel	0	2	0	0	2	0	0	0	2	X	6

Sheet C	1	2	3	4	5	6	7	8	9	10	Final
Purdy	1	0	1	0	1	0	0	0	X	X	3
Lawton	0	2	0	2	0	0	1	3	X	X	8

Sheet D	1	2	3	4	5	6	7	8	9	10	Final
Burnett	0	1	0	1	0	0	0	2	0	X	4
Thiele	0	0	1	0	2	1	1	0	2	X	7

=== Draw 6 ===
February 3, 7:00 PM CT

Sheet A	1	2	3	4	5	6	7	8	9	10	Final
Streifel	0	0	0	2	0	0	1	1	0	X	4
Thiele	0	0	0	0	1	0	0	0	0	X	1

Sheet B	1	2	3	4	5	6	7	8	9	10	11	Final
Purdy	0	1	1	0	1	0	1	0	2	1	0	7
Syrota	1	0	0	2	0	3	0	1	0	0	1	8

Sheet C	1	2	3	4	5	6	7	8	9	10	Final
Eberle	0	0	2	1	1	0	5	0	X	X	9
Burnett	1	1	0	0	0	1	0	1	X	X	4

Sheet D	1	2	3	4	5	6	7	8	9	10	Final
Lawton	2	0	0	2	1	0	2	1	X	X	8
Birnie	0	0	1	0	0	1	0	0	X	X	2

=== Draw 7 ===
February 4, 9:30 AM CT

Sheet A	1	2	3	4	5	6	7	8	9	10	11	Final
Eberle	1	0	1	0	0	1	0	3	0	1	0	7
Birnie	0	1	0	0	2	0	2	0	2	0	1	8

Sheet B	1	2	3	4	5	6	7	8	9	10	Final
Burnett	1	0	1	0	1	0	X	X	X	X	3
Lawton	0	3	0	3	0	3	X	X	X	X	9

Sheet C	1	2	3	4	5	6	7	8	9	10	Final
Syrota	1	0	0	1	0	0	0	1	0	2	5
Streifel	0	0	1	0	0	0	2	0	1	0	4

Sheet D	1	2	3	4	5	6	7	8	9	10	Final
Thiele	2	3	0	3	X	X	X	X	X	X	8
Purdy	0	0	1	0	X	X	X	X	X	X	1

=== TieBreaker ===
February 4, 7:00 PM CT

Sheet A	1	2	3	4	5	6	7	8	9	10	11	Final
Syrota	0	0	0	0	1	0	3	0	1	0	1	6
Birnie	0	0	0	1	0	1	0	1	0	2	0	5

== Playoffs ==
Semifinal			Final
			1	Tracy Streifel	7
2	Stefanie Lawton	5	3	Delores Syrota	5
3	Delores Syrota	6

=== Semifinal ===
February 5, 9:30 AM CT

Sheet A	1	2	3	4	5	6	7	8	9	10	11	Final
Lawton	2	0	0	0	0	0	0	0	1	2	0	5
Syrota	0	0	1	0	2	0	1	1	0	0	1	6

=== Final ===
February 5, 2:00 PM CT

Sheet A	1	2	3	4	5	6	7	8	9	10	Final
Streifel	0	2	0	1	0	0	0	3	0	1	7
Syrota	0	0	2	0	0	1	0	0	2	0	5
