= 2004 Saskatchewan Scott Tournament of Hearts =

The 2004 Saskatchewan Scott Tournament of Hearts women's provincial curling championship, was held January 28 to February 1 at the Meadow Lake Civic Centre in Meadow Lake, Saskatchewan. The winning team of Sherry Anderson, represented Saskatchewan at the 2004 Scott Tournament of Hearts in Red Deer, Alberta, where the team finished round robin with a 7-4 record, missing out on the playoffs, after losing a tiebreaker to Manitoba's Lois Fowler.

== Teams ==
- Sherry Anderson
- Jan Betker
- Amber Holland
- Stefanie Miller
- Patty Rocheleau
- Chantelle Seiferling
- Cindy Street
- Delores Syrota

== Standings ==
Skip	W	L
Jan Betker	7	0
Sherry Anderson	6	1
Amber Holland	4	3
Patty Rocheleau	4	3
Stefanie Miller	4	3
Chantelle Seiferling	3	4
Cindy Street	1	6
Delores Syrota	0	7

== Tiebreaker 1 ==
Team	Final
Stefanie Miller	2
Patty Rocheleau	8

== Tiebreaker 2 ==
Team	Final
Amber Holland	9
Patty Rocheleau	5

== Playoffs ==
Semifinal			Final
			1	Jan Betker	5
2	Sherry Anderson	10	2	Sherry Anderson	8
3	Amber Holland	4
