= 2008 Saskatchewan Scotties Tournament of Hearts =

- Host city: North Battleford, Saskatchewan
- Arena: North Battleford Civic Centre
- Dates: January 23–27
- Winner: Michelle Englot
- Curling club: Tartan CC, Regina
- Skip: Michelle Englot
- Third: Darlene Kidd
- Second: Roberta Materi
- Lead: Cindy Simmons
- Finalist: Stefanie Lawton

The 2008 Saskatchewan Scotties Tournament of Hearts women's provincial curling championship, was held from January 23 to 27 at the North Battleford Civic Centre in North Battleford, Saskatchewan. The winning team of Michelle Englot, represented Saskatchewan at the 2008 Scotties Tournament of Hearts in Regina, Saskatchewan, where she would finish with a 5–6 record.

== Teams ==
Skip	Vice	Second	Lead	Club
Sherry Anderson	Kim Hodson	Heather Walsh	Donna Gignac	Granite Curling Club, Saskatoon
Linda Burnham	Rochelle Balfour	Donna Ell	Kendra Richards	Callie Curling Club, Regina
Michelle Englot	Darlene Kidd	Roberta Materi	Cindy Simmons	Tartan Curling Club, Regina
Angela Gordon	Cindy Street	Cori Dauphinais	Susan Hoffart	Callie Curling Club, Regina
Amber Holland	Kim Schneider	Tammy Schneider	Heather Kalenchuk	Kronau Curling Club, Kronau
Stefanie Lawton	Marliese Kasner	Sherri Singler	Lana Vey	CN Curling Club, Saskatoon
Rene Miettinen	Maegan Clark	Amy Jurgens	Amy Yeager	Humboldt Curling Club, Humboldt
Ros Stewart	Julie Vandenameele	Cristina Goertzen	Andrea Rudulier	Nutana Curling Club, Saskatoon
Cathy Trowell	Myrna Nielsen	Denise Hersikorn	Lynn Doll	Yorkton Curling Club, Yorkton

== Round-robin standings ==
Final round-robin standings

Key
Teams to Playoffs

Skip	W	L
Michelle Englot	6	2
Ros Stewart	6	2
Stefanie Lawton	6	2
Sherry Anderson	5	3
Amber Holland	3	5
Angela Gordon	3	5
Linda Burnham	3	5
Cathy Trowell	2	6
Rene Meittinen	2	6

== Results ==
=== Draw 1 ===
January 23, 2:00 PM CT

Sheet A	1	2	3	4	5	6	7	8	9	10	Final
Holland	2	0	0	0	1	0	0	0	X	X	3
Anderson	0	2	2	3	0	0	2	0	X	X	9

Sheet B	1	2	3	4	5	6	7	8	9	10	11	Final
Englot	1	3	0	3	0	2	0	0	1	0	3	13
Miettinen	0	0	2	0	3	0	2	1	0	2	0	10

Sheet C	1	2	3	4	5	6	7	8	9	10	Final
Trowell	3	0	0	0	0	1	0	1	0	2	7
Gordon	0	2	1	0	3	0	1	0	1	0	8

Sheet D	1	2	3	4	5	6	7	8	9	10	Final
Stewart	0	0	0	0	4	1	0	1	2	X	8
Burnham	1	1	1	1	0	0	2	0	0	X	6

=== Draw 2 ===
January 23, 7:00 PM CT

Sheet A	1	2	3	4	5	6	7	8	9	10	Final
Gordon	0	0	2	0	1	0	0	1	0	X	4
Miettinen	2	2	0	2	0	0	1	0	2	X	9

Sheet B	1	2	3	4	5	6	7	8	9	10	11	Final
Lawton	1	0	2	0	1	0	0	1	1	0	0	6
Stewart	0	1	0	0	0	2	2	0	0	1	1	7

Sheet C	1	2	3	4	5	6	7	8	9	10	Final
Englot	0	0	0	1	1	0	0	1	0	X	3
Holland	1	1	1	0	0	0	1	0	2	X	6

Sheet D	1	2	3	4	5	6	7	8	9	10	Final
Trowell	1	0	2	0	1	0	2	0	0	2	8
Anderson	0	2	0	1	0	2	0	1	1	0	7

=== Draw 3 ===
January 24, 2:00 PM CT

Sheet A	1	2	3	4	5	6	7	8	9	10	Final
Stewart	1	1	0	1	0	3	0	3	X	X	9
Trowell	0	0	1	0	1	0	2	0	X	X	4

Sheet B	1	2	3	4	5	6	7	8	9	10	Final
Holland	0	0	1	1	0	4	0	1	1	0	8
Burnham	0	3	0	0	4	0	1	0	0	2	10

Sheet C	1	2	3	4	5	6	7	8	9	10	Final
Miettinen	2	0	0	0	1	0	2	0	1	0	6
Lawton	0	1	1	2	0	1	0	2	0	1	8

Sheet D	1	2	3	4	5	6	7	8	9	10	Final
Gordon	0	1	0	0	0	2	1	0	0	X	4
Englot	1	0	1	2	1	0	0	3	1	X	9

=== Draw 4 ===
January 24, 7:00 PM CT

Sheet A	1	2	3	4	5	6	7	8	9	10	Final
Miettinen	0	1	0	1	0	0	1	0	X	X	3
Burnham	1	0	2	0	1	1	0	3	X	X	8

Sheet B	1	2	3	4	5	6	7	8	9	10	Final
Trowell	0	0	0	0	0	1	0	1	1	0	3
Lawton	0	0	2	0	0	0	2	0	0	1	5

Sheet C	1	2	3	4	5	6	7	8	9	10	Final
Gordon	0	1	0	1	0	0	0	X	X	X	2
Anderson	0	0	4	0	3	0	1	X	X	X	8

Sheet D	1	2	3	4	5	6	7	8	9	10	Final
Holland	0	1	1	2	0	0	2	1	X	X	7
Stewart	0	0	0	0	1	0	0	0	X	X	1

=== Draw 5 ===
January 25, 9:30 AM CT

Sheet A	1	2	3	4	5	6	7	8	9	10	Final
Lawton	2	0	0	2	1	0	2	1	X	X	8
Holland	0	2	0	0	0	1	0	0	X	X	3

Sheet B	1	2	3	4	5	6	7	8	9	10	Final
Anderson	1	0	0	1	0	1	2	0	1	X	6
Englot	0	2	3	0	1	0	0	2	0	X	8

Sheet C	1	2	3	4	5	6	7	8	9	10	Final
Stewart	0	1	0	1	0	1	1	3	2	X	9
Miettinen	1	0	1	0	2	0	0	0	0	X	4

Sheet D	1	2	3	4	5	6	7	8	9	10	Final
Burnham	1	1	0	0	1	1	0	0	1	1	6
Trowell	0	0	2	0	0	0	1	1	0	0	4

=== Draw 6 ===
January 25, 2:00 PM CT

Sheet A	1	2	3	4	5	6	7	8	9	10	Final
Trowell	1	0	0	0	2	0	0	1	X	X	4
Englot	0	2	2	1	0	2	1	0	X	X	8

Sheet B	1	2	3	4	5	6	7	8	9	10	Final
Gordon	1	0	0	2	0	2	4	0	3	X	12
Holland	0	2	3	0	1	0	0	1	0	X	7

Sheet C	1	2	3	4	5	6	7	8	9	10	11	Final
Lawton	1	0	0	1	0	2	2	1	0	0	1	8
Burnham	0	0	2	0	3	0	0	0	1	1	0	7

Sheet D	1	2	3	4	5	6	7	8	9	10	Final
Anderson	0	2	0	1	0	1	0	1	0	2	7
Miettinen	1	0	2	0	0	0	1	0	2	0	6

=== Draw 7 ===
January 25, 7:00 PM CT

Sheet A	1	2	3	4	5	6	7	8	9	10	Final
Burnham	0	0	1	0	1	1	0	0	1	X	4
Gordon	1	0	0	2	0	0	2	1	0	X	6

Sheet B	1	2	3	4	5	6	7	8	9	10	Final
Miettinen	1	0	0	2	0	1	0	0	0	X	4
Trowell	0	1	0	0	3	0	1	0	3	X	8

Sheet C	1	2	3	4	5	6	7	8	9	10	Final
Anderson	1	0	1	0	2	0	0	1	0	0	5
Stewart	0	1	0	1	0	1	1	0	0	2	6

Sheet D	1	2	3	4	5	6	7	8	9	10	Final
Englot	0	0	2	2	0	1	0	0	0	X	5
Lawton	0	1	0	0	2	0	4	0	0	X	7

=== Draw 8 ===
January 26, 9:30 AM CT

Sheet A	1	2	3	4	5	6	7	8	9	10	Final
Anderson	0	0	0	0	1	0	1	0	1	1	4
Lawton	0	0	0	0	0	2	0	0	0	0	2

Sheet B	1	2	3	4	5	6	7	8	9	10	Final
Stewart	0	2	0	1	3	0	0	1	0	1	8
Gordon	0	0	2	0	0	2	1	0	1	0	7

Sheet C	1	2	3	4	5	6	7	8	9	10	11	Final
Burnham	0	1	0	1	1	1	0	0	1	1	0	6
Englot	0	0	1	0	0	0	1	4	0	0	2	8

Sheet D	1	2	3	4	5	6	7	8	9	10	Final
Miettinen	1	1	0	2	2	0	3	X	X	X	9
Holland	0	0	1	0	0	1	0	X	X	X	2

=== Draw 9 ===
January 26, 2:00 PM CT

Sheet A	1	2	3	4	5	6	7	8	9	10	Final
Englot	1	1	0	2	0	0	0	1	2	X	7
Stewart	0	0	2	0	0	1	0	0	0	X	3

Sheet B	1	2	3	4	5	6	7	8	9	10	11	Final
Burnham	1	1	0	0	0	2	0	0	3	0	0	7
Anderson	0	0	1	0	3	0	1	0	0	2	4	11

Sheet C	1	2	3	4	5	6	7	8	9	10	Final
Holland	3	1	0	2	2	X	X	X	X	X	8
Trowell	0	0	1	0	0	X	X	X	X	X	1

Sheet D	1	2	3	4	5	6	7	8	9	10	Final
Lawton	0	1	1	1	1	2	0	1	X	X	7
Gordon	0	0	0	0	0	0	1	0	X	X	1

== Playoffs ==
Semifinal			Final
			1	Michelle Englot	5
2	Ros Stewart	5	3	Stefanie Lawton	4
3	Stefanie Lawton	7

=== Semifinal ===
January 26, 7:00 PM CT

Sheet A	1	2	3	4	5	6	7	8	9	10	Final
Stewart	0	0	1	3	1	0	0	0	0	X	5
Lawton	1	0	0	0	0	1	2	2	1	X	7

=== Final ===
January 27, 2:00 PM CT

Sheet A	1	2	3	4	5	6	7	8	9	10	Final
Englot	0	1	0	2	0	0	0	0	0	2	5
Lawton	1	0	1	0	0	0	1	0	1	0	4
