= 2003 Saskatchewan Scott Tournament of Hearts =

The 2003 Saskatchewan Scott Tournament of Hearts women's provincial curling championship, was held January 22–26 at the Balgonie Stardome in Balgonie, Saskatchewan. The winning team of Jan Betker, represented Saskatchewan at the 2003 Scott Tournament of Hearts in Kitchener, Ontario, where the team finished round robin with a 7–4 record, losing the 3–4 game to Newfoundland's Cathy Cunningham.

== Teams ==
- Sue Altman
- Sherry Anderson
- Lorraine Arguin
- Jan Betker
- Nancy Inglis
- Stefanie Miller
- Patty Rocheleau
- Chantelle Seiferling

== Standings ==
Skip	W	L
Sherry Anderson	6	1
Jan Betker	5	2
Patty Rocheleau	5	2
Chantelle Seiferling	4	3
Nancy Inglis	3	4
Stefanie Miller	3	4
Lorraine Arguin	2	5
Sue Altman	0	7

== Results ==
=== Draw 1 ===
January 22, 3:00 PM CT

Sheet A	1	2	3	4	5	6	7	8	9	10	Final
Rocheleau	0	0	0	0	0	3	0	1	1	1	5
Inglis	1	0	0	0	1	0	2	0	0	0	4

Sheet B	1	2	3	4	5	6	7	8	9	10	Final
Seiferling	0	3	0	0	1	0	3	1	4	X	12
Altman	0	0	0	1	0	2	0	0	0	X	3

Sheet C	1	2	3	4	5	6	7	8	9	10	Final
Arguin	2	0	0	0	0	0	1	0	0	X	3
Miller	0	0	1	0	1	1	0	2	1	X	6

Sheet D	1	2	3	4	5	6	7	8	9	10	Final
Anderson	0	0	2	1	0	1	0	2	0	0	6
Betker	0	1	0	0	1	0	2	0	1	0	5

=== Draw 2 ===
January 22, 8:00 PM CT

Sheet A	1	2	3	4	5	6	7	8	9	10	Final
Altman	0	0	1	0	0	1	0	1	0	X	3
Betker	1	0	0	2	0	0	1	0	2	X	6

Sheet B	1	2	3	4	5	6	7	8	9	10	11	Final
Arguin	1	0	0	1	0	1	2	0	0	1	0	6
Rocheleau	0	3	0	0	1	0	0	1	1	0	1	7

Sheet C	1	2	3	4	5	6	7	8	9	10	11	Final
Inglis	1	0	1	0	0	2	0	2	0	0	0	6
Anderson	0	1	0	2	0	0	0	0	2	1	2	8

Sheet D	1	2	3	4	5	6	7	8	9	10	Final
Miller	2	0	0	3	0	1	0	1	0	X	7
Seiferling	0	3	2	0	2	0	2	0	1	X	10

=== Draw 3 ===
January 23, 9:30 AM CT

Sheet A	1	2	3	4	5	6	7	8	9	10	11	Final
Anderson	1	0	0	1	0	2	0	0	1	1	1	7
Rocheleau	0	1	1	0	2	0	1	1	0	0	0	6

Sheet B	1	2	3	4	5	6	7	8	9	10	11	Final
Altman	0	1	1	0	0	3	0	2	0	2	0	9
Miller	0	0	0	1	2	0	2	0	4	0	1	10

Sheet C	1	2	3	4	5	6	7	8	9	10	Final
Seiferling	0	0	2	0	2	0	2	0	1	0	7
Betker	0	0	0	3	0	1	0	3	0	1	8

Sheet D	1	2	3	4	5	6	7	8	9	10	11	Final
Arguin	0	0	2	2	0	0	0	1	0	0	1	6
Inglis	0	0	0	0	1	1	1	0	1	1	0	5

=== Draw 4 ===
January 23, 2:00 PM CT

Sheet A	1	2	3	4	5	6	7	8	9	10	Final
Seiferling	2	0	1	0	2	0	1	1	0	2	9
Arguin	0	1	0	1	0	1	0	0	3	0	6

Sheet B	1	2	3	4	5	6	7	8	9	10	Final
Betker	2	0	0	1	1	0	0	0	1	1	6
Inglis	0	2	4	0	0	0	1	0	0	0	7

Sheet C	1	2	3	4	5	6	7	8	9	10	Final
Anderson	0	0	1	0	1	1	0	0	0	2	5
Altman	0	1	0	1	0	0	1	0	1	0	4

Sheet D	1	2	3	4	5	6	7	8	9	10	Final
Rocheleau	1	0	0	0	0	1	1	0	0	1	4
Miller	0	0	1	0	1	0	0	1	0	0	3

=== Draw 5 ===
January 24, 2:00 PM CT

Sheet A	1	2	3	4	5	6	7	8	9	10	Final
Betker	0	0	2	0	0	0	0	2	0	1	5
Miller	0	0	0	0	2	0	1	0	1	0	4

Sheet B	1	2	3	4	5	6	7	8	9	10	Final
Anderson	0	3	1	0	5	0	5	X	X	X	14
Arguin	0	0	0	2	0	2	0	X	X	X	4

Sheet C	1	2	3	4	5	6	7	8	9	10	Final
Rocheleau	0	3	2	0	0	2	1	X	X	X	8
Seiferling	0	0	0	1	0	0	0	X	X	X	1

Sheet D	1	2	3	4	5	6	7	8	9	10	Final
Inglis	1	0	1	0	1	0	2	1	1	X	7
Altman	0	1	0	3	0	1	0	0	0	X	5

=== Draw 6 ===
January 24, 7:00 PM CT

Sheet A	1	2	3	4	5	6	7	8	9	10	Final
Arguin	0	0	0	2	2	1	0	0	2	X	7
Altman	0	0	0	0	0	0	1	1	0	X	2

Sheet B	1	2	3	4	5	6	7	8	9	10	11	Final
Rocheleau	1	0	0	1	0	1	0	0	0	1	0	4
Betker	0	0	0	0	1	0	0	2	1	0	1	5

Sheet C	1	2	3	4	5	6	7	8	9	10	Final
Miller	0	0	0	1	0	3	0	3	0	1	8
Inglis	0	0	1	0	2	0	1	0	2	0	6

Sheet D	1	2	3	4	5	6	7	8	9	10	Final
Seiferling	0	0	0	0	3	0	0	1	0	1	5
Anderson	0	0	0	0	0	0	3	0	1	0	4

=== Draw 7 ===
January 25, 9:30 AM CT

Sheet A	1	2	3	4	5	6	7	8	9	10	Final
Miller	1	0	1	0	3	0	2	0	0	1	8
Anderson	0	2	0	3	0	1	0	0	3	0	9

Sheet B	1	2	3	4	5	6	7	8	9	10	Final
Inglis	0	1	0	2	1	2	0	1	2	X	9
Seiferling	1	0	2	0	0	0	2	0	0	X	5

Sheet C	1	2	3	4	5	6	7	8	9	10	Final
Betker	1	0	0	0	1	0	2	0	1	X	5
Arguin	0	0	0	1	0	1	0	1	0	X	3

Sheet D	1	2	3	4	5	6	7	8	9	10	Final
Altman	1	2	0	1	1	0	0	1	0	0	6
Roceleau	0	0	2	0	0	3	1	0	0	2	8

== Playoffs ==
Semifinal			Final
			1	Sherry Anderson	4
2	Jan Betker	6	2	Jan Betker	6
3	Patty Rocheleau	4

=== Semifinal ===
January 25, 7:00 PM CT

Sheet A	1	2	3	4	5	6	7	8	9	10	Final
Betker	1	0	0	0	1	0	3	0	0	1	6
Rocheleau	0	1	1	1	0	0	0	1	0	0	4

=== Final ===
January 26, 2:00 PM CT

Sheet A	1	2	3	4	5	6	7	8	9	10	Final
Anderson	0	0	1	0	1	0	0	1	1	0	4
Betker	0	0	0	3	0	2	0	0	0	1	6
