= 1998 Saskatchewan Scott Tournament of Hearts =

Women's provincial curling championship

The 1998 Saskatchewan Scott Tournament of Hearts women's provincial curling championship, was held January 21–25 at the Rosetown Sports Centre in Rosetown, Saskatchewan. The winning team of Cathy Trowell, represented Saskatchewan at the 1998 Scott Tournament of Hearts in Regina, Saskatchewan, where the team finished round robin with a 6-5 record, missing the playoffs after losing a tiebreaker to British Columbia's Sue Garvey.

== Teams ==
Skip	Vice	Second	Lead	Club
Lorraine Arguin	Vicki Hagerty	Janie Johnson	Shelly Urguhart	Moose Jaw Hillcrest, Moose Jaw
Kim Hodson	Lori McGeary	Heather Walsh	Linda Horley	Nutana Curling Club, Saskatoon
Amber Holland	Kay Montgomery	Patty Bell	Lisa Lewis	Callie Curling Club, Regina
Jill Johnston	Heather McMillan	Trish Harris-Schentag	Tammy Renz	Nutana Curling Club, Saskatoon
Rhoda Marshall	Val Griller	Maureen Nioth	Faye Ingram	Quill Lake Curling Club, Quill Lake
Patty Rocheleau	Tracy Streifel	Colleen Gerling	Christine Campbell	Sutherland Curling Club, Saskatoon
Michelle Schneider	Darlene Kidd	Roberta Moore	Priscilla Hanley	Callie Curling Club, Regina
Cathy Trowell	Kristy Lewis	Karen Daku	Keri-Lynn Schikowski	Callie Curling Club, Regina

== Standings ==
Skip	W	L
Cathy Trowell	6	1
Michelle Schneider	6	1
Amber Holland	4	3
Kim Hodson	4	3
Lorraine Arguin	3	4
Patty Rocheleau	2	5
Rhoda Marshall	2	5
Jill Johnston	1	6

== Results ==
=== Draw 1 ===
January 21, 7:00 PM CT

Sheet A	1	2	3	4	5	6	7	8	9	10	Final
Arguin	2	0	0	1	0	1	0	0	0	X	4
Marshall	0	0	2	0	2	0	2	1	1	X	8

Sheet B	1	2	3	4	5	6	7	8	9	10	Final
Schneider	0	2	2	2	0	1	0	0	1	X	8
Hodson	0	0	0	0	1	0	1	1	0	X	3

Sheet C	1	2	3	4	5	6	7	8	9	10	11	Final
Holland	0	0	0	0	0	2	0	2	1	0	1	6
Johnston	2	0	0	0	1	0	1	0	0	1	0	5

Sheet D	1	2	3	4	5	6	7	8	9	10	Final
Rocheleau	1	0	2	0	0	0	1	0	0	0	4
Trowell	0	1	0	1	2	0	0	1	1	2	8

=== Draw 2 ===
January 22, 10:00 AM CT

Sheet A	1	2	3	4	5	6	7	8	9	10	Final
Trowell	0	0	1	1	0	1	0	1	0	0	4
Holland	1	0	0	0	1	0	0	0	0	1	3

Sheet B	1	2	3	4	5	6	7	8	9	10	Final
Johnston	0	0	0	2	0	0	1	0	X	X	3
Rocheleau	0	1	0	0	3	3	0	5	X	X	12

Sheet C	1	2	3	4	5	6	7	8	9	10	Final
Schneider	1	0	0	2	0	0	1	0	0	2	6
Marshall	0	1	1	0	0	1	0	0	2	0	5

Sheet D	1	2	3	4	5	6	7	8	9	10	Final
Hodson	1	0	0	0	0	1	0	2	0	1	5
Arguin	0	1	0	0	2	0	2	0	1	0	6

=== Draw 3 ===
January 22, 2:30 PM CT

Sheet A	1	2	3	4	5	6	7	8	9	10	Final
Schneider	1	1	0	2	0	4	1	X	X	X	9
Arguin	0	0	1	0	1	0	0	X	X	X	2

Sheet B	1	2	3	4	5	6	7	8	9	10	Final
Hodson	3	0	0	4	0	1	0	0	2	X	10
Marshall	0	1	1	0	2	0	1	0	0	X	5

Sheet C	1	2	3	4	5	6	7	8	9	10	Final
Johnston	2	0	0	0	1	0	0	0	0	1	4
Trowell	0	0	0	1	0	0	0	3	1	0	5

Sheet D	1	2	3	4	5	6	7	8	9	10	11	Final
Holland	1	0	0	0	2	0	0	0	1	2	0	6
Rocheleau	0	0	1	1	0	1	1	2	0	0	4	10

=== Draw 4 ===
January 23, 10:00 AM CT

Sheet A	1	2	3	4	5	6	7	8	9	10	Final
Marshall	0	0	0	1	1	0	1	0	X	X	3
Trowell	1	3	1	0	0	1	0	2	X	X	8

Sheet B	1	2	3	4	5	6	7	8	9	10	Final
Holland	0	0	2	0	0	0	1	0	1	X	4
Schneider	2	0	0	0	2	0	0	2	0	X	6

Sheet C	1	2	3	4	5	6	7	8	9	10	Final
Rocheleau	1	0	0	0	0	1	0	1	0	0	3
Hodson	0	0	0	2	0	0	0	0	1	2	5

Sheet D	1	2	3	4	5	6	7	8	9	10	Final
Arguin	1	0	0	2	0	2	0	3	0	4	12
Johnston	0	0	2	0	1	0	3	0	2	0	8

=== Draw 5 ===
January 23, 2:00 PM CT

Sheet A	1	2	3	4	5	6	7	8	9	10	Final
Hodson	0	2	0	2	0	3	0	1	0	X	8
Johnston	1	0	1	0	1	0	1	0	2	X	6

Sheet B	1	2	3	4	5	6	7	8	9	10	Final
Rocheleau	1	0	0	1	0	0	0	0	1	0	3
Arguin	0	0	1	0	0	0	0	1	0	2	4

Sheet C	1	2	3	4	5	6	7	8	9	10	Final
Trowell	1	0	0	1	0	0	1	0	2	1	6
Schneider	0	0	2	0	0	1	0	2	0	0	5

Sheet D	1	2	3	4	5	6	7	8	9	10	Final
Marshall	0	0	1	0	1	0	1	0	X	X	3
Holland	3	2	0	3	0	1	0	4	X	X	13

=== Draw 6 ===
January 27, 7:00 PM CT

Sheet A	1	2	3	4	5	6	7	8	9	10	11	Final
Rocheleau	0	1	0	1	0	0	1	1	2	0	0	6
Schneider	0	0	1	0	2	1	0	0	0	2	1	7

Sheet B	1	2	3	4	5	6	7	8	9	10	Final
Marshall	0	0	1	0	2	0	0	1	0	X	4
Johnston	1	0	0	2	0	1	2	0	1	X	7

Sheet C	1	2	3	4	5	6	7	8	9	10	Final
Arguin	0	1	0	0	1	0	0	0	2	X	4
Holland	2	0	1	0	0	0	2	2	0	X	7

Sheet D	1	2	3	4	5	6	7	8	9	10	11	Final
Trowell	1	0	1	0	1	0	0	1	0	0	0	4
Hodson	0	0	0	0	0	1	1	0	1	1	1	5

=== Draw 7 ===
January 24, 10:00 AM CT

Sheet A	1	2	3	4	5	6	7	8	9	10	Final
Holland	0	0	1	0	2	0	0	1	0	2	6
Hodson	0	1	0	1	0	1	0	0	1	0	4

Sheet B	1	2	3	4	5	6	7	8	9	10	Final
Arguin	0	0	1	0	0	0	0	X	X	X	1
Trowell	1	0	0	1	1	1	2	X	X	X	6

Sheet C	1	2	3	4	5	6	7	8	9	10	Final
Marshall	0	1	3	1	1	0	2	2	X	X	10
Rocheleau	2	0	0	0	0	0	3	0	0	X	5

Sheet D	1	2	3	4	5	6	7	8	9	10	Final
Johnston	0	0	2	0	0	1	0	0	X	X	3
Schneider	1	3	0	0	1	0	2	3	X	X	10

=== TieBreaker ===
January 24, 7:00 PM CT

Sheet A	1	2	3	4	5	6	7	8	9	10	Final
Holland	1	0	0	0	2	2	0	3	0	X	8
Hodson	0	1	0	0	0	0	3	0	1	X	5

== Playoffs ==
Semifinal			Final
			1	Cathy Trowell	5
2	Michelle Schneider	7	2	Michelle Schneider	3
3	Amber Holland	5

=== Semifinal ===
January 29, 1:00 PM CT

Sheet A	1	2	3	4	5	6	7	8	9	10	Final
Schneider	1	0	2	0	0	1	0	1	0	2	7
Holland	0	1	0	0	1	0	2	0	1	0	5

=== Final ===
January 29, 5:00 PM CT

Sheet A	1	2	3	4	5	6	7	8	9	10	Final
Trowell	0	1	0	0	0	1	1	0	1	1	5
Schneider	0	0	0	1	1	0	0	1	0	0	3
