= 2002 Saskatchewan Scott Tournament of Hearts =

The 2002 Saskatchewan Scott Tournament of Hearts women's provincial curling championship, was held January 23–27 at the Melfort Northern Lights Palace in Melfort, Saskatchewan. The winning team of Sherry Anderson, represented Saskatchewan at the 2002 Scott Tournament of Hearts in Brandon, Manitoba, where the team finished round robin with a 9–2 record, before losing to Team Canada's Colleen Jones.

== Teams ==
- Sue Altman
- Sherry Anderson
- Jan Betker
- June Campbell
- Amber Holland
- Michelle Ridgway
- Patty Rocheleau
- Tracy Streifel

== Standings ==
Skip	W	L
Michelle Ridgway	6	1
Sherry Anderson	6	1
Jan Betker	5	2
June Campbell	4	3
Patty Rocheleau	3	4
Amber Holland	2	5
Sue Altman	1	6
Tracy Streifel	1	6

== Playoffs ==
Semifinal			Final
			1	Michelle Ridgway	5
2	Sherry Anderson	4	2	Sherry Anderson	7
3	Jan Betker	1

=== Semifinal ===
January 29, 1:00 PM CT

Sheet A	1	2	3	4	5	6	7	8	9	10	Final
Anderson 🔨	1	0	0	0	0	0	1	1	1	X	4
Betker	0	0	1	0	0	0	0	0	0	X	1

=== Final ===
January 29, 5:00 PM CT

Sheet A	1	2	3	4	5	6	7	8	9	10	Final
Ridgway 🔨	1	0	0	0	1	0	1	0	2	0	5
Anderson	0	2	0	1	0	1	0	2	0	1	7
