= 2011 SaskTel Tankard =

- Host city: North Battleford, Saskatchewan
- Arena: Battleford Curling Club
- Dates: February 2–6
- Winner: Pat Simmons
- Curling club: Tartan CC, Regina, SK
- Skip: Steve Laycock
- Fourth: Pat Simmons
- Second: Brennen Jones
- Lead: Dallan Muyres
- Finalist: Carl deConinck Smith

The 2011 SaskTel Tankard was held February 2–6 at the Battleford Curling Club in North Battleford, Saskatchewan. The winning Pat Simmons team (skipped by Steve Laycock) represented Saskatchewan at the 2011 Tim Hortons Brier in London, Ontario.

== Teams ==
Skip	Third	Second	Lead	Club(s)
Scott Bitz	Mark Lang	Aryn Schmidt	Dean Hicke	Tartan Curling Club, Regina
Randy Bryden	Troy Robinson	Trent Knapp	Kelly Knapp	Caledonian Curling Club, Regina
Darren Camm	John Carlos	Mark Streckler	Michael Streckler	Sutherland Curling Club, Saskatoon
Carl deConinck Smith	Jeff Sharp	Chris Haichert	Jesse St. John	Rosetown Curling Club, Rosetown
Mike Eberle	Shane Vollman	Chris Krasowski	Shaun Seiferling	Highland Curling Club, Regina
Derek Gaudreau	Aaron Gaudreau	Darren LaMotte	Chris Unger	Shellbrook Curling Club, Shellbrook
Brent Gedak	John Aston	Derek Owens	Malcolm Vanstone	Estevan Curling Club, Estevan
Mark Herbert	Rob Auckland	Chad Jones	Travis Gansauge	Bushell Park Curling Club, Moose Jaw
Brian Humble	Dean Kleiter	Cameron Koch	Kerry Tarasoff	Sutherland Curling Club, Saskatoon
Jamey Jordison	Matt Froehlich	Chadd McKenzie	Derek Dejaegher	Bushell Park Curling Club, Moose Jaw
Shawn Joyce	Gary Scheirich	James McKenzie	Jeremy Tipper	Nutana Curling Club, Saskatoon
Mark Lane	Scott Coghlan	Mark Larsen	Dave Zukewich	Martensville Curling Club, Martensville
Brad Law	Scott Comfort	Dave Kidby	Dustin Kidby	Tartan Curling Club, Regina
Terry Marteniuk	Mike McIntyre	Ray Nabe	Ray Sharp	Yorkton Curling Club, Yorkton
Dean Moulding	Garrett Vey	Ray Morgan	Darwin Williamson	Caledonian Curling Club, Regina
Pat Simmons	Steve Laycock (skip)	Brennen Jones	Dallan Muyres	Tartan Curling Club, Regina

== Draw Brackets ==
=== A Event ===
Round of 16
Simmons	12
Jordison	3
Humble	9
Camm	4
Lane	2
Herbert	5
Eberle	1
deConinck Smith	10
Bitz	8
Gaudreau	3
Law	6
Moulding	7
Joyce	6
Gedak	7
Marteniuk	5
Bryden	6

Quarter-finals
Simmons	8
Humble	3
Herbert	4
deConinck Smith	6
Moulding	1
Bitz	7
Gedak	3
Bryden	7

Semi-finals
Simmons	6
deConinck Smith	7
Bitz	8
Bryden	5

A Qualifier Match
deConinck Smith	7
Bitz	6

=== B Event ===
Round of 16
Jordison	1
Camm	9
Gaudreau	4
Law	5

Quarterfinals
Camm	6
Herbert	3
Law	6
Gedak	3

Semifinals
Camm	5
Bryden	7
Law	5
Simmons	8

to Qualifier match
Bryden	4
Simmons	7

Round of 16
Lane	7
Eberle	0
Joyce	8
Marteniuk	7

Quarterfinals
Lane	5
Humble	4
Joyce	8
Moulding	4

Semifinals
Lane	3
Joyce	8

Finals
Joyce	7
Bitz	1
B Qualifier Match
Simmons	10
Joyce	5

=== C Event ===
Round of 16
Jordison	7
Eberle	10
Herbert	9
Gedak	5

Quarterfinals
Eberle	2
Law	8
Lane	7
Herbert	5

Semifinals
Bitz	4
Law	10
Lane	1
Bryden	8

C Qualifier Match
Law	7
Bryden	5

Round of 16
Gaudreau	5
Marteniuk	7

Quarterfinals
Marteniuk	7
Camm	8
Humble	8
Moulding	0

Semifinals
Camm	6
Humble	4

C Qualifier Match
Camm	6
Joyce	8

== Results ==
- All times CST

=== Draw 1 ===
February 2, 3:00pm

Team	1	2	3	4	5	6	7	8	9	10	Final
Pat Simmons	0	3	0	1	4	0	4	X	X	X	12
Jamey Jordison	0	0	2	0	0	1	0	X	X	X	3

Team	1	2	3	4	5	6	7	8	9	10	Final
Darren Camm	0	0	1	0	2	0	1	0	X	X	4
Brian Humble	0	3	0	2	0	1	0	3	X	X	9

Team	1	2	3	4	5	6	7	8	9	10	Final
Mark Lane	0	0	0	1	0	0	0	1	0	X	2
Mark Herbert	0	0	0	0	1	1	1	0	2	X	5

Team	1	2	3	4	5	6	7	8	9	10	Final
Mike Eberle	0	0	0	0	0	1	0	X	X	X	1
Carl deConinck Smith	0	0	5	1	1	0	3	X	X	X	10

=== Draw 2 ===
February 2, 7:00pm

Team	1	2	3	4	5	6	7	8	9	10	Final
Derek Gaudreau	1	0	1	1	0	0	0	0	X	X	3
Scott Bitz	0	2	0	0	0	2	3	1	X	X	8

Team	1	2	3	4	5	6	7	8	9	10	Final
Brad Law	0	0	1	1	0	3	0	1	0	0	6
Dean Moulding	0	1	0	0	3	0	1	0	0	2	7

Team	1	2	3	4	5	6	7	8	9	10	11	Final
Brent Gedak	1	1	1	0	1	0	1	1	0	0	1	7
Shawn Joyce	0	0	0	2	0	2	0	0	0	2	0	6

Team	1	2	3	4	5	6	7	8	9	10	Final
Terry Marteniuk	0	0	1	0	2	0	0	2	0	0	5
Randy Bryden	2	0	0	1	0	1	0	0	0	2	6

=== Draw 3 ===
February 3, 8:30am

Team	1	2	3	4	5	6	7	8	9	10	Final
Pat Simmons	0	2	0	1	0	0	2	0	3	X	8
Brian Humble	1	0	1	0	1	0	0	0	0	X	3

Team	1	2	3	4	5	6	7	8	9	10	Final
Mark Herbert	0	0	2	0	1	0	1	0	0	0	4
Carl deConinck Smith	1	0	0	2	0	2	0	0	0	1	6

Team	1	2	3	4	5	6	7	8	9	10	Final
Dean Moulding	0	0	0	0	1	0	0	X	X	X	1
Scott Bitz	0	0	2	1	0	3	1	X	X	X	7

Team	1	2	3	4	5	6	7	8	9	10	Final
Brent Gedak	1	0	0	0	1	1	0	0	0	X	3
Randy Bryden	0	0	2	0	0	0	2	2	1	X	7

=== Draw 4 ===
February 3, 3:00pm

Team	1	2	3	4	5	6	7	8	9	10	Final
Jamey Jordison	0	0	0	1	0	X	X	X	X	X	1
Darren Camm	2	1	2	0	4	X	X	X	X	X	9

Team	1	2	3	4	5	6	7	8	9	10	Final
Derek Gaudreau	1	0	1	0	0	0	0	1	0	1	4
Brad Law	0	1	0	1	1	1	0	0	1	0	5

Team	1	2	3	4	5	6	7	8	9	10	Final
Mark Lane	1	2	1	0	2	1	X	X	X	X	7
Mike Eberle	0	0	0	0	0	0	X	X	X	X	0

Team	1	2	3	4	5	6	7	8	9	10	Final
Terry Marteniuk	1	0	2	0	2	0	1	0	1	0	7
Shawn Joyce	0	1	0	1	0	2	0	2	0	2	8

=== Draw 5 ===
February 3, 7:00pm

Team	1	2	3	4	5	6	7	8	9	10	Final
Carl deConinck Smith	1	0	0	0	2	0	0	3	0	1	7
Pat Simmons	0	2	1	0	0	0	2	0	1	0	6

Team	1	2	3	4	5	6	7	8	9	10	Final
Randy Bryden	0	1	0	1	0	1	0	0	2	X	5
Scott Bitz	2	0	2	0	1	0	1	2	0	X	8

Team	1	2	3	4	5	6	7	8	9	10	Final
Darren Camm	0	1	0	2	0	0	0	0	3	X	6
Mark Herbert	1	0	1	0	0	0	0	1	0	X	3

Team	1	2	3	4	5	6	7	8	9	10	Final
Brent Gedak	1	0	0	0	1	0	0	1	0	X	3
Brad Law	0	1	1	1	0	1	1	0	1	X	6

=== Draw 6 ===
February 4, 8:00am

Team	1	2	3	4	5	6	7	8	9	10	Final
Mark Lane	0	0	0	2	0	0	3	0	0	0	5
Brian Humble	0	0	1	0	0	1	0	2	0	0	4

Team	1	2	3	4	5	6	7	8	9	10	Final
Dean Moulding	2	0	0	0	0	1	0	1	0	X	4
Shawn Joyce	0	2	0	1	0	0	3	0	2	X	8

Team	1	2	3	4	5	6	7	8	9	10	Final
Jamey Jordison	2	0	0	3	0	0	1	0	1	X	7
Mike Eberle	0	2	2	0	2	1	0	3	0	X	10

Team	1	2	3	4	5	6	7	8	9	10	Final
Derek Gaudreau	1	0	0	1	0	1	0	0	2	0	5
Terry Marteniuk	0	1	1	0	3	0	0	1	0	1	7

=== Draw 7 ===
February 4, 12:00pm

Team	1	2	3	4	5	6	7	8	9	10	11	Final
Carl deConinck Smith	0	2	1	0	0	2	0	0	1	0	1	7
Scott Bitz	0	0	0	1	1	0	3	0	0	1	0	6

Team	1	2	3	4	5	6	7	8	9	10	Final
Darren Camm	0	0	1	1	0	0	0	2	0	1	5
Randy Bryden	2	1	0	0	0	1	2	0	1	0	7

Team	1	2	3	4	5	6	7	8	9	10	Final
Pat Simmons	1	0	2	0	3	0	1	0	1	X	8
Brad Law	0	2	0	1	0	1	0	1	0	X	5

Team	1	2	3	4	5	6	7	8	9	10	Final
Mark Herbert	0	3	0	1	0	3	0	1	1	X	9
Brent Gedak	1	0	1	0	3	0	0	0	0	X	5

=== Draw 8 ===
February 4, 4:00pm

Team	1	2	3	4	5	6	7	8	9	10	Final
Mark Lane	1	0	0	1	0	0	1	0	0	X	3
Shawn Joyce	0	2	0	0	0	1	0	4	1	X	8

Team	1	2	3	4	5	6	7	8	9	10	Final
Darren Camm	0	0	1	0	2	0	3	0	2	0	8
Terry Marteniuk	1	1	0	2	0	1	0	1	0	1	7

Team	1	2	3	4	5	6	7	8	9	10	Final
Brian Humble	2	1	1	1	3	X	X	X	X	X	8
Dean Moulding	0	0	0	0	0	X	X	X	X	X	0

=== Draw 9 ===
February 4, 8:00pm

Team	1	2	3	4	5	6	7	8	9	10	Final
Randy Bryden	0	1	0	0	2	0	0	0	1	X	4
Pat Simmons	1	0	0	1	0	2	1	2	0	X	7

Team	1	2	3	4	5	6	7	8	9	10	Final
Shawn Joyce	3	1	1	0	0	2	0	X	X	X	7
Scott Bitz	0	0	0	0	0	0	1	X	X	X	1

Team	1	2	3	4	5	6	7	8	9	10	Final
Brad Law	2	0	1	0	0	5	X	X	X	X	8
Mike Eberle	0	1	0	0	1	0	X	X	X	X	2

Team	1	2	3	4	5	6	7	8	9	10	11	Final
Mark Lane	0	1	0	1	0	1	0	0	2	0	2	7
Mark Herbert	2	0	0	0	1	0	1	0	0	1	0	5

=== Draw 10 ===
February 5, 9:00am

Team	1	2	3	4	5	6	7	8	9	10	Final
Shawn Joyce	0	1	0	1	0	2	0	1	0	X	5
Pat Simmons	1	0	3	0	2	0	2	0	2	X	10

Team	1	2	3	4	5	6	7	8	9	10	Final
Scott Bitz	0	1	0	0	1	0	2	0	0	X	4
Brad Law	1	0	5	0	0	1	0	1	2	X	10

Team	1	2	3	4	5	6	7	8	9	10	Final
Mark Lane	0	0	1	0	0	0	X	X	X	X	1
Randy Bryden	1	0	0	3	2	2	X	X	X	X	8

Team	1	2	3	4	5	6	7	8	9	10	Final
Brian Humble	1	0	0	0	1	0	1	0	1	X	4
Darren Camm	0	1	1	0	0	2	0	2	0	X	6

=== Draw 11 ===
February 5, 2:00pm

Team	1	2	3	4	5	6	7	8	9	10	Final
Brad Law	0	0	0	4	0	1	1	0	1	0	7
Randy Bryden	0	0	0	0	2	0	0	2	0	1	5

Team	1	2	3	4	5	6	7	8	9	10	11	Final
Darren Camm	0	1	0	1	0	0	2	0	0	2	0	6
Shawn Joyce	1	0	1	0	1	0	0	1	2	0	2	8

== Playoffs ==
Page playoff system
1	Carl deConinck Smith	2
2	Pat Simmons	6
3	Brad Law	6
4	Shawn Joyce	9

Semifinal
1	Carl deConinck Smith	8
4	Shawn Joyce	3

Final
2	Pat Simmons	8
1	Carl deConinck Smith	6

=== 1 vs. 2 ===
February 5, 7:00pm

Team	1	2	3	4	5	6	7	8	9	10	Final
Pat Simmons	1	1	0	1	1	0	0	0	2	X	6
Carl deConinck Smith	0	0	1	0	0	0	1	0	0	X	2

=== 3 vs. 4 ===
February 5, 7:00pm

Team	1	2	3	4	5	6	7	8	9	10	Final
Brad Law	0	0	0	2	0	0	2	0	2	0	6
Shawn Joyce	1	2	1	0	1	1	0	1	0	2	9

=== Semi-final ===
February 6, 9:30am

Team	1	2	3	4	5	6	7	8	9	10	Final
Shawn Joyce	1	0	1	0	1	0	0	0	X	X	3
Carl deConinck Smith	0	2	0	1	0	0	2	3	X	X	8

=== Final ===
February 6, 2:00pm

Sheet C	1	2	3	4	5	6	7	8	9	10	Final
Pat Simmons	1	0	0	2	0	2	0	2	0	1	8
Carl deConinck Smith	0	1	0	0	2	0	2	0	1	0	6
