= 2000 Saskatchewan Scott Tournament of Hearts =

Women's provincial curling championship

The 2000 Saskatchewan Scott Tournament of Hearts women's provincial curling championship, was held January 26–30 at the Humboldt Uniplex in Humboldt, Saskatchewan. The winning team of June Campbell, represented Saskatchewan at the 2000 Scott Tournament of Hearts in Prince George, British Columbia, where the team finished round robin with an 8-3 record, before losing the 3-4 game to British Columbia's Kelley Law.

== Teams ==
Skip	Vice	Second	Lead	Club
Sherry Anderson	Kim Hodson	Sandra Mulroney	Donna Gignac	Delisle Curling Club, Delisle
June Campbell	Cathy Walter	Karen Daku	Leanne Whitrow	Callie Curling Club, Regina
Anita Cowlishaw	Christine Trombley	Barb Marleau	Jodi Bruce	Nipawin Curling Club, Nipawin
Brenda Goertzen	Heidi Schappert	Dawn Horner	Sheila Schill	Martensville Curling Club, Martensville
Leah Harper	Patty Thompson	Val McKinnon	Phyllis Haug	Assiniboia Curling Club, Assiniboia
Amber Holland	Kay Montgomery	Karen Purdy	Patty Bell	Callie Curling Club, Regina
Sherry Linton	Darlene Kidd	Allison Tanner	Tanya Herback	Callie Curling Club, Regina
Anita Silvernagle	Maxine Montgomery	Julie Vandenameele	Tammy Renz	Biggar Curling Club, Biggar

== Standings ==
Skip	W	L
June Campbell	6	1
Amber Holland	6	1
Sherry Anderson	5	2
Sherry Linton	3	4
Anita Cowlishaw	3	4
Anita Silvernagle	2	5
Brenda Goertzen	2	5
Leah Harper	1	6

== Results ==
=== Draw 1 ===
January 26, 7:30 PM CT

Sheet A	1	2	3	4	5	6	7	8	9	10	Final
Cowlishaw	0	1	0	0	1	1	1	1	0	0	5
Harper	0	0	1	1	0	0	0	0	1	1	4

Sheet B	1	2	3	4	5	6	7	8	9	10	Final
Holland	2	0	2	0	0	1	1	0	0	1	7
Anderson	0	3	0	0	2	0	0	1	0	0	6

Sheet C	1	2	3	4	5	6	7	8	9	10	Final
Linton	1	3	1	0	2	0	2	X	X	X	9
Goertzen	0	0	0	1	0	0	0	X	X	X	1

Sheet D	1	2	3	4	5	6	7	8	9	10	Final
Campbell	1	0	1	1	0	2	1	1	0	0	7
Silvernagle	0	1	0	0	2	0	0	0	1	0	4

=== Draw 2 ===
January 27, 9:30 AM CT

Sheet A	1	2	3	4	5	6	7	8	9	10	Final
Campbell	2	1	1	0	0	1	0	0	1	2	8
Linton	0	0	0	4	1	0	1	0	0	0	6

Sheet B	1	2	3	4	5	6	7	8	9	10	11	Final
Goertzen	0	0	2	1	0	0	0	2	0	2	0	7
Silvernagle	0	1	0	0	1	1	2	0	2	0	1	8

Sheet C	1	2	3	4	5	6	7	8	9	10	Final
Holland	0	0	0	0	3	0	1	0	2	1	7
Cowlishaw	1	1	1	1	0	0	0	2	0	0	6

Sheet D	1	2	3	4	5	6	7	8	9	10	Final
Anderson	1	0	1	3	3	1	X	X	X	X	9
Harper	0	1	0	0	0	0	X	X	X	X	1

=== Draw 3 ===
January 27, 2:00 PM CT

Sheet A	1	2	3	4	5	6	7	8	9	10	Final
Holland	2	0	2	0	3	2	0	2	0	X	11
Harper	0	3	0	2	0	0	1	0	1	X	7

Sheet B	1	2	3	4	5	6	7	8	9	10	Final
Anderson	1	0	0	1	1	0	0	3	0	1	7
Cowlishaw	0	0	1	0	0	2	1	0	1	0	5

Sheet C	1	2	3	4	5	6	7	8	9	10	Final
Goertzen	0	1	0	1	0	0	0	0	3	X	5
Campbell	0	0	1	0	2	1	1	2	0	X	7

Sheet D	1	2	3	4	5	6	7	8	9	10	11	Final
Linton	0	0	1	0	0	1	0	1	0	3	0	6
Silvernagle	0	0	0	2	0	0	2	0	2	0	1	7

=== Draw 4 ===
January 28, 9:30 AM CT

Sheet A	1	2	3	4	5	6	7	8	9	10	11	Final
Cowlishaw	1	1	0	0	3	0	0	2	0	0	2	9
Campbell	0	0	0	2	0	3	1	0	0	1	0	7

Sheet B	1	2	3	4	5	6	7	8	9	10	Final
Linton	0	2	0	0	0	0	X	X	X	X	2
Holland	2	0	2	1	1	2	x	X	X	X	8

Sheet C	1	2	3	4	5	6	7	8	9	10	Final
Silvernagle	1	0	1	1	1	0	1	0	0	1	6
Anderson	0	1	0	0	0	3	0	1	2	0	0

Sheet D	1	2	3	4	5	6	7	8	9	10	Final
Harper	0	2	0	0	0	1	0	1	0	X	4
Goertzen	0	0	1	0	1	0	3	0	4	X	9

=== Draw 5 ===
January 28, 2:00 PM CT

Sheet A	1	2	3	4	5	6	7	8	9	10	Final
Anderson	2	0	1	0	2	0	0	0	2	X	7
Goertzen	0	1	0	1	0	0	0	2	0	X	4

Sheet B	1	2	3	4	5	6	7	8	9	10	11	Final
Silvernagle	0	0	2	1	0	2	0	0	1	0	0	6
Harper	0	0	0	0	2	0	1	1	0	2	1	7

Sheet C	1	2	3	4	5	6	7	8	9	10	Final
Campbell	1	0	0	1	0	0	1	0	0	1	4
Holland	0	1	0	0	0	0	0	2	0	0	3

Sheet D	1	2	3	4	5	6	7	8	9	10	Final
Cowlishaw	0	0	2	0	0	1	0	X	X	X	3
Linton	0	3	0	0	3	0	4	X	X	X	10

=== Draw 6 ===
January 28, 7:00 PM CT

Sheet A	1	2	3	4	5	6	7	8	9	10	Final
Sivernagle	0	2	0	1	0	0	0	0	0	0	3
Holland	0	0	2	0	1	0	0	1	0	3	7

Sheet B	1	2	3	4	5	6	7	8	9	10	Final
Cowlishaw	0	1	2	0	3	0	1	0	0	0	7
Goertzen	3	0	0	3	0	2	0	0	1	1	10

Sheet C	1	2	3	4	5	6	7	8	9	10	Final
Harper	0	0	0	1	0	X	X	X	X	X	1
Linton	3	2	2	0	3	X	X	X	X	X	10

Sheet D	1	2	3	4	5	6	7	8	9	10	Final
Campbell	0	1	1	0	4	0	2	0	0	X	8
Anderson	0	0	0	2	0	2	0	0	1	X	5

=== Draw 7 ===
January 29, 9:30 PM CT

Sheet A	1	2	3	4	5	6	7	8	9	10	Final
Linton	0	0	1	0	2	0	0	1	X	X	4
Anderson	1	2	0	2	0	1	2	0	X	X	8

Sheet B	1	2	3	4	5	6	7	8	9	10	Final
Harper	0	1	0	0	0	1	0	1	0	X	3
Campbell	1	0	1	1	3	0	1	0	2	X	9

Sheet C	1	2	3	4	5	6	7	8	9	10	Final
Cowlishaw	2	0	0	2	2	0	1	0	1	0	8
Silvernagle	0	0	4	0	0	1	0	1	0	1	7

Sheet D	1	2	3	4	5	6	7	8	9	10	Final
Goertzen	0	0	0	1	1	0	1	0	1	X	4
Holland	1	0	1	0	0	2	0	2	0	X	6

== Playoffs ==
Semifinal			Final
			1	June Campbell	6
2	Amber Holland	5	3	Sherry Anderson	4
3	Sherry Anderson	7

=== Semifinal ===
January 29, 7:00 PM CT

Sheet A	1	2	3	4	5	6	7	8	9	10	Final
Holland	0	1	0	0	0	2	0	0	2	0	5
Anderson	0	0	0	2	1	0	1	1	0	2	7

=== Final ===
January 30, 2:00 PM CT

Sheet A	1	2	3	4	5	6	7	8	9	10	Final
Campbell	1	0	1	1	1	0	0	0	2	X	6
Anderson	0	0	0	0	0	2	1	1	0	X	4
