= 2001 Saskatchewan Scott Tournament of Hearts =

The 2001 Saskatchewan Scott Tournament of Hearts women's provincial curling championship, was held January 24–28 at the Estevan Arena in Estevan, Saskatchewan. The winning team of Michelle Ridgway, represented Saskatchewan at the 2001 Scott Tournament of Hearts in Sudbury, Ontario, where the team finished round robin with a 4–7 record.

== Teams ==
- Sue Altman
- Sherry Anderson
- June Campbell
- Barbara Griffin
- Kristy Lewis
- Michelle Ridgway
- Patty Rocheleau
- Cathy Trowell

== Standings ==
Skip	W	L
Michelle Ridgway	5	2
Patty Rocheleau	5	2
Sherry Anderson	5	2
Cathy Trowell	4	3
June Campbell	3	4
Sue Altman	3	4
Kristy Lewis	2	5
Barbara Griffin	1	6

== Playoffs ==
Semifinal			Final
			1	Michelle Ridgway	5
2	Patty Rocheleau	6	2	Sherry Anderson	4
3	Sherry Anderson	7
