= Susan Lang =

Canadian judge

Susan Elizabeth Lang, CM is a retired Canadian judge who served on the Court of Appeal for Ontario from 2004 to 2013. She is best known for conducting the Independent Review of the Motherisk Hair Analysis laboratory, which exposed serious flaws in forensic hair testing used in child protection and criminal proceedings in Ontario.

== Early life and education ==
Lang was born in Sault Ste. Marie, Ontario. She attended Osgoode Hall Law School and was called to the Ontario Bar in 1976.

== Legal career ==
Before her appointment to the bench, Lang practised primarily in family law. She was a co-founder of Lang Ireland, an all-women law firm in Toronto, Ontario.

== Judicial career ==
Lang was appointed to the District Court of Ontario on 21 February 1989. Following the merger of Ontario's courts in 1990, she became a judge of the Ontario Court (General Division), which was later renamed the Superior Court of Justice. She served as Toronto Regional Senior Judge from 1996 to 1999.

During her tenure on the Superior Court, Justice Lang was the first woman to serve as president of the Canadian Superior Courts Judges Association. She also served as president of the Ontario Superior Court Judges' Association.

In 2004, Lang was elevated to the Court of Appeal for Ontario. She served as an appellate judge until 2010, when she elected supernumerary status. She retired from the Court of Appeal in 2013.

== Post-judicial career ==
In November 2014, the Government of Ontario appointed Lang as Independent Reviewer of the Motherisk Hair Analysis Review. Her mandate was to examine the adequacy and reliability of hair-strand drug and alcohol testing methodology used by the Motherisk Drug Testing Laboratory at the Hospital for Sick Children in Toronto between 2005 and 2015 for use in child protection and criminal proceedings.

Lang submitted her report to the Attorney General of Ontario on 15 December 2015. The review concluded that the hair testing used by the laboratory was "inadequate and unreliable for use in child protection and criminal proceedings" and that the laboratory "did not meet internationally recognised forensic standards". The report found that the laboratory had been using preliminary screening tests to draw definitive conclusions about drug and alcohol use, rather than conducting proper confirmation testing. Lang noted that between 2005 and 2015, the laboratory had tested hair samples from more than 16,000 individuals for child protection purposes.

The review's findings led to the establishment of the Motherisk Commission, headed by Justice Judith Beaman, to review individual cases that may have been affected by the flawed testing. Lang's work also influenced the development of Ontario's Forensic Laboratories Act, the first legislation of its kind in Canada.

== Honours and recognition ==
Lang was appointed a Member of the Order of Canada in 2018 for her distinguished legal career and her leadership of the Motherisk Hair Analysis Independent Review.

In 2016, the Law Society of Upper Canada conferred upon her an honorary Doctor of Laws degree (LLD, honoris causa) in recognition of her contributions to the legal profession, the judiciary, and the Ontario public.

Lang is a Senior Fellow of Massey College at the University of Toronto.

== Personal life ==
Lang is married to Patrick LeSage, the former Chief Justice of the Ontario Superior Court of Justice.
