= Chantelle Eberle =

Canadian curler

- Curler
- Born: Chantelle Seiferling; September 17, 1981 (age 45); Regina, Saskatchewan, Canada

Team
- Curling club: Highland CC, Regina, SK
- Skip: Chantelle Eberle
- Third: Chaelynn Kitz
- Second: Jana Tisdale
- Lead: Haylee Jameson

Curling career
- Hearts: 0
- World Mixed Doubles Championship: 1 (2012)
- Top CTRS ranking: 16th (2013-14, 2014-15)
- Grand Slam victories: 0
Medal record
Curling
Representing Saskatchewan
Canadian Mixed Doubles Trials
Bronze medal – third place	2013 Leduc

Chantelle Dawn Eberle (born September 17, 1981 in Regina, Saskatchewan as Chantelle Seiferling) is a Canadian curler.

== Background ==
Eberle was one of the top junior curlers in Saskatchewan during her junior career. In 2001, she won her lone provincial junior title, playing second for Stefanie Lawton (Miller). The team, which also included Stefanie's sister Marliese at third, and Chelsey Matson (Bell) at lead went undefeated at the 2001 Canadian Junior Curling Championships after the round robin. However, the team went up against another strong team in Prince Edward Island's Suzanne Birt (Gaudet). P.E.I beat the Saskatchewan four-some 5-3.

Since her junior career, Eberle has been one of the top skips in Saskatchewan. She played in her first women's provincial in 2003, when her rink placed 4th in the province. Since then she has also played in the 2004, 2005, 2006, 2009, 2010, 2011 and 2012 provincial championships. Her best finish was 3rd at the 2006 Saskatchewan Scott Tournament of Hearts.

== Wins ==
In 2011, Eberle won the 2012 Canadian Mixed Curling Championship for Saskatchewan, playing third for Jason Ackerman. Eberle and Dean Hicke, the second on that team traveled to Erzurum, Turkey to play at the 2012 World Mixed Doubles Curling Championship to represent Canada. The pair won their group by posting an undefeated 8-0 record, but they lost in the quarter final to Sweden, eliminating them from the event.

== Grand Slam record ==
Key
C	Champion
F	Lost in Final
SF	Lost in Semifinal
QF	Lost in Quarterfinals
R16	Lost in the round of 16
Q	Did not advance to playoffs
T2	Played in Tier 2 event
DNP	Did not participate in event
N/A	Not a Grand Slam event that season

Event	2007–08	2008–09	2009–10	2010–11	2011–12	2012–13	2013–14	2014–15
Autumn Gold	DNP	DNP	DNP	DNP	DNP	DNP	DNP	Q
Colonial Square	N/A	N/A	N/A	N/A	N/A	Q	Q	Q
Canadian Open	N/A	N/A	N/A	N/A	N/A	N/A	N/A	Q
Wayden Transportation	Q	DNP	N/A	N/A	N/A	N/A	N/A	N/A
Manitoba Liquor & Lotteries	Q	DNP	DNP	Q	Q	DNP	DNP	N/A
