= Lana Vey =

Canadian curler

- Curler
- Born: April 6, 1984 (age 42); Saskatoon, Saskatchewan, Canada

Team
- Curling club: Carlyle CC, Carlyle, SK
- Skip: Candace Chisholm
- Third: Lana Vey
- Second: Natalie Bloomfield
- Lead: Kristy Johnson

Curling career
- Hearts: 4 (2007, 2009, 2012, 2015)
- Top CTRS ranking: 4th (2007-08)
- Grand Slam victories: 0
Medal record
Curling
Scotties Tournament of Hearts
Silver medal – second place	2007 Lethbridge

Lana Vey (born April 6, 1984, in Saskatoon, Saskatchewan) is a Canadian curler from Regina, Saskatchewan.

Vey had no prior national championship experience when she was picked up to play third for Jan Betker for the 2006–07 season to replace Sherry Linton. However, the team had quite a successful season, going all the way to the 2007 Scotties Tournament of Hearts final, but losing to Kelly Scott's rink in the final.

After the season, Vey was picked up to play lead for the Stefanie Lawton rink. She would find success on that team as well. While they failed to win the provincial championship that year, they did qualify for the 2008 Canada Cup of Curling, which they won. The following season, the Lawton rink did win the provincial championship, and finished in fourth place at the 2009 Scotties Tournament of Hearts in Victoria, British Columbia. She played third for Michelle Englot for the 2010–2011 season.
