= Roberta Materi =

Canadian curler

- Curler
- Born: April 6, 1975 (age 51); Regina, Saskatchewan

Team
- Curling club: Tartan CC, Regina, SK

Curling career
- Hearts: 3 (2001, 2008, 2012)
- Top CTRS ranking: 7th (2007-08)
- Grand Slam victories: 1 (Manitoba Lotteries, 2008)

Roberta Materi (born April 6, 1975 in Regina, Saskatchewan) is a Canadian curler from White City, Saskatchewan.

== Life ==
Materi has played with Michelle Englot off and on since 1997. She missed two seasons (2004–05 and 2005–06) since then to have children.

Materi played in her first national championship when the rink qualified for the 2001 Scott Tournament of Hearts. The team finished with a 4-7 record, missing the playoffs. Later that year, the team finished 5-4 at the 2001 Canadian Olympic Curling Trials, also missing the playoffs.

The team would not return to the Hearts until 2008, where the team finished 5-6, missing the playoffs again. Later that year, they picked up their only Grand Slam victory, winning the 2008 Casinos of Winnipeg Classic.

Materi won her third provincial title in 2012, and returned to the Hearts for her third event at the 2012 Scotties Tournament of Hearts.

She works as a human resources manager for SaskTel.
