= Jan Betker =

Canadian curler and Olympic medalist

Medal record

Women's curling

Representing Canada

Olympic Games
Gold medal – first place	1998 Nagano	Team

World Championships
Gold medal – first place	1993 Geneva	Team
Gold medal – first place	1994 Oberstdorf	Team
Gold medal – first place	1997 Berne	Team

Representing Saskatchewan

Scotties Tournament of Hearts
Gold medal – first place	1993 Brandon	
Gold medal – first place	1994 Kitchener	
Gold medal – first place	1997 Vancouver	
Silver medal – second place	2007 Lethbridge	
Bronze medal – third place	1995 Calgary	
Bronze medal – third place	1998 Regina	

Canadian Olympic Curling Trials
Gold medal – first place	1997 Brandon	

Janice "Jan" Betker (born July 19, 1960, in Regina, Saskatchewan) is a Canadian curler. Betker is best known for playing third on the Sandra Schmirler rink that won three world championships and an Olympic gold medal in the 1990s. Following Schmirler's death from cancer in 2000, Betker replaced her as the team's skip.

In 2019, Betker was named the greatest Canadian female third in history in a TSN poll of broadcasters, reporters and top curlers.

== Curling career ==
As part of the Schmirler team Betker won 3 Canadian curling championships in 1993, 1994, and 1997. As well the team also won 3 world championships in 1993, 1994, and 1997. In 1998 the team won the Gold Medal for curling at the Nagano Olympics. Betker also won a Canadian Mixed Curling Championship in 1984 as the lead for Randy Woytowich.

At first Betker refused to skip the team following the death of her longtime skip Schmirler. However, in 2003 Betker took over as skip and took her team to the 2003 Scott Tournament of Hearts. The team finished fourth overall.

In 2005, at the Canada Cup of Curling, Betker and her team placed second. However this showing was still enough to win them a spot at the 2005 Canadian Olympic Trials in Halifax as the winner of the event, Shannon Kleibrink already had won an Olympic Trial berth. Betker finished 4-5 at the event with Kleibrink the eventual winner.

Betker returned to the national championships in 2007. Joan McCusker, who had played second for both Schmirler and Betker retired from competitive curling and was replaced by her sister, Nancy Inglis. Sherry Linton, former third, joined Jolene McIvor's rink for the 2006-2007 season and was replaced by newcomer, Lana Vey. Betker's team made it all the way to the final before losing to Kelly Scott. After the season, Betker announced she was "taking a break" from curling. She returned for three World Curling Tour events in 2008-09 and one in 2011-12, but has not curled competitively since.

In 2017, Betker stopped curling entirely.

== Personal life ==
She is an administrator with Laurie Artiss The Pin People.
