= 2011 Colonial Square Ladies Classic =

World Curling Tour event

- Host city: Saskatoon, Saskatchewan
- Arena: Nutana Curling Club
- Dates: October 28–31
- Winner: (Alberta) Crystal Webster
- Curling club: Calgary CC, Calgary
- Skip: Crystal Webster
- Third: Erin Carmody
- Second: Geri-Lynn Ramsay
- Lead: Samantha Preston
- Finalist: (Alberta) Valerie Sweeting

The 2011 Colonial Square Ladies Classic was held from October 28 to 31 at the Nutana Curling Club in Saskatoon, Saskatchewan as part of the 2011–12 World Curling Tour. The purse for the event was CAD$35,000, and was a triple knockout format.

== Teams ==
Skip	Third	Second	Lead	Locale
Shinobu Aota	Mayo Yamaura	Anna Ohmiya	Kotomi Ishizaki	Aomori, Japan
Brett Barber	Kailena Bay	Allison Cameron	Krista White	Biggar, Saskatchewan
Brandee Borne	Kara Kilden	Andrea Rudulier	Jen Buettner	Saskatoon, Saskatchewan
Jolene Campbell	Melissa Hoffman	Maegan Clark	Michelle McIvor	Humboldt, Saskatchewan
Candace Chisholm	Ros Stewart	Natalie Bloomfield	Kristy Johnson	Estevan, Saskatchewan
Michelle Corbeil	Dawn Corbeil	Krista Regnier	Alana Horn	Lloydminster, Alberta
Delia DeJong	Jessica Monk	Amy Janko	Aisha Veiner	Grande Prairie, Alberta
Chantelle Eberle	Nancy Inglis	Debbie Lozinski	Susan Hoffart	Regina, Saskatchewan
Michelle Englot	Lana Vey	Roberta Materi	Sarah Slywka	Regina, Saskatchewan
Lisa Eyamie	Maria Bushell	Jodi Marthaller	Kyla MacLachlan	Calgary, Alberta
Debbie Folk	Nancy Martin	Jen Person	Denise Tondell	Saskatoon, Saskatchewan
Diane Foster	Vicki Sjolie	Judy Pendergast	Cheryl Meek	Calgary, Alberta
Rachel Fritzler	Aly Johns	Ashley Quick	Amy Merkosky	Saskatoon, Saskatchewan
Janet Harvey	Cherie-Ann Loder	Kristin Loder	Carey Kirby	Winnipeg, Manitoba
Michèle Jäggi	Marisa Winkelhausen	Stéphanie Jäggi	Nicole Schwälgi	Bern, Switzerland
Jennifer Jones	Kaitlyn Lawes	Jennifer Clark-Rouire	Dawn Askin	Winnipeg, Manitoba
Susan Lang	Amanda Craigie	Danielle Sicinski	Tamara Haberstock	Moose Jaw, Saskatchewan
Stefanie Lawton	Sherry Anderson	Sherri Singler	Marliese Kasner	Saskatoon, Saskatchewan
Brooklyn Lemon	Shelby Hubick	Kari Paulsen	Jessica Hanson	Saskatoon, Saskatchewan
Morgan Muise	Lyndsay Wegmann	Sarah Horne	Michelle Collin	Calgary, Alberta
Ayumi Ogasawara	Yumie Funayama	Kaho Onodera	Chinami Yoshida	Sapporo, Japan
Mirjam Ott	Carmen Schäfer	Carmen Küng	Janine Greiner	Switzerland
Trish Paulsen	Kari Kennedy	Sarah Collin	Tessa Ruetz	Saskatoon, Saskatchewan
Allison Pottinger	Nicole Joraanstad	Natalie Nicholson	Tabitha Peterson	St. Paul, Minnesota
Jill Shumay	Kara Johnston	Taryn Holtby	Jinaye Ayrey	Saskatoon, Saskatchewan
Manuela Siegrist	Alina Paetz	Claudia Hug	Nicole Dunki	Basel, Switzerland
Robyn Silvernagle	Kelsey Dutton	Dayna Demmans	Cristina Goertzen	Meadow Lake, Saskatchewan
Valerie Sweeting	Leslie Rogers	Joanne Taylor	Rachelle Pidherny	Edmonton, Alberta
Silvana Tirinzoni	Irene Schori	Esther Neuenschwander	Sandra Gantenbein	Switzerland
Kirsten Wall	Hollie Nicol	Danielle Inglis	Jill Mouzar	Toronto, Ontario
Wang Bingyu	Liu Yin	Yue Qingshuang	Zhou Yan	Harbin, China
Crystal Webster	Erin Carmody	Geri-Lynn Ramsay	Samantha Preston	Calgary, Alberta

== Results ==
=== A Event ===
First Knockout
(Manitoba) Jennifer Jones	6
(Switzerland) Manuela Siegrist	1
(Japan) Shinobu Aota	6
(Saskatchewan) Michelle Englot	4
(Switzerland) Michèle Jäggi	6
(Saskatchewan) Brandee Borne	5
(Alberta) Diane Foster	8
(Saskatchewan) Chantelle Eberle	9
(Alberta) Crystal Webster	4
(Alberta) Michelle Corbeil	2
(Saskatchewan) Robyn Silvernagle	5
(Manitoba) Janet Harvey	8
(Saskatchewan) Jolene Campbell	6
(Saskatchewan) Candace Chisholm	4
(Alberta) Morgan Muise	2
(China) Wang Bingyu	7

Quarterfinals
(Manitoba) Jennifer Jones	10
(Japan) Shinobu Aota	1
(Switzerland) Michèle Jäggi	7
(Saskatchewan) Chantelle Eberle	4
(Alberta) Crystal Webster	6
(Manitoba) Janet Harvey	3
(Saskatchewan) Jolene Campbell	1
(China) Wang Bingyu	6

Semifinals
(Manitoba) Jennifer Jones	4
(Switzerland) Michèle Jäggi	2
(Alberta) Crystal Webster	1
(China) Wang Bingyu	6

Qualifier 1
(Manitoba) Jennifer Jones	5
(China) Wang Bingyu	7

First Knockout
(Switzerland) Mirjam Ott	7
(Japan) Ayumi Ogasawara	2
(Saskatchewan) Debbie Folk	2
(Minnesota) Allison Pottinger	8
(Saskatchewan) Trish Paulsen	5
(Saskatchewan) Brooklyn Lemon	2
(Saskatchewan) Jill Shumay	5
(Alberta) Valerie Sweeting	7
(Ontario) Kirsten Wall	8
(Saskatchewan) Brett Barber	2
(Alberta) Delia DeJong	6
(Alberta) Lisa Eyamie	5
(Switzerland) Silvana Tirinzoni	5
(Saskatchewan) Susan Lang	4
(Saskatchewan) Rachel Fritzler	6
(Saskatchewan) Stefanie Lawton	9

Quarterfinals
(Switzerland) Mirjam Ott	8
(Minnesota) Allison Pottinger	3
(Saskatchewan) Trish Paulsen	4
(Alberta) Valerie Sweeting	8
(Ontario) Kirsten Wall	5
(Alberta) Delia DeJong	7
(Switzerland) Silvana Tirinzoni	3
(Saskatchewan) Stefanie Lawton	8

Semifinals
(Switzerland) Mirjam Ott	8
(Alberta) Valerie Sweeting	2
(Alberta) Delia DeJong	4
(Saskatchewan) Stefanie Lawton	10

Qualifier 2
(Switzerland) Mirjam Ott	8
(Saskatchewan) Stefanie Lawton	7

=== B Event ===
Second Knockout
(Switzerland) Manuela Siegrist	6
(Saskatchewan) Michelle Englot	7
(Alberta) Diane Foster	5
(Saskatchewan) Brandee Borne	4

Quarterfinals
(Manitoba) Janet Harvey	6
(Saskatchewan) Michelle Englot	2
(Saskatchewan) Jolene Campbell	8
(Alberta) Diane Foster	6

Semifinals
(Manitoba) Janet Harvey	4
(Alberta) Valerie Sweeting	5
(Saskatchewan) Jolene Campbell	4
(Alberta) Delia DeJong	2

To Qualifier 3
(Alberta) Valerie Sweeting	8
(Saskatchewan) Jolene Campbell	4

Second Knockout
(Alberta) Michelle Corbeil	6
(Saskatchewan) Robyn Silvernagle	5
(Saskatchewan) Candace Chisholm	9
(Alberta) Morgan Muise	7

Quarterfinals
(Japan) Shinobu Aota	8
(Alberta) Michelle Corbeil	5
(Saskatchewan) Chantelle Eberle	2
(Saskatchewan) Candace Chisholm	5

Semifinals
(Japan) Shinobu Aota	5
(Saskatchewan) Candace Chisholm	6

To Qualifier 3
(Saskatchewan) Candace Chisholm	2
(Saskatchewan) Stefanie Lawton	6
Qualifier 3
(Alberta) Valerie Sweeting	4
(Saskatchewan) Stefanie Lawton	6

Second Knockout
(Japan) Ayumi Ogasawara	6
(Saskatchewan) Debbie Folk	4
(Saskatchewan) Brooklyn Lemon	6
(Saskatchewan) Jill Shumay	5

Quarterfinals
(Ontario) Kirsten Wall	1
(Japan) Ayumi Ogasawara	6
(Switzerland) Silvana Tirinzoni	5
(Saskatchewan) Brooklyn Lemon	3

Semifinals
(Japan) Ayumi Ogasawara	2
(Switzerland) Michèle Jäggi	6
(Switzerland) Silvana Tirinzoni	2
(Alberta) Crystal Webster	4

To Qualifier 4
(Switzerland) Michèle Jäggi	3
(Alberta) Crystal Webster	9

Second Knockout
(Saskatchewan) Brett Barber	5
(Alberta) Lisa Eyamie	6
(Saskatchewan) Susan Lang	4
(Saskatchewan) Rachel Fritzler	6

Quarterfinals
(Minnesota) Allison Pottinger	0
(Alberta) Lisa Eyamie	7
(Saskatchewan) Trish Paulsen	5
(Saskatchewan) Rachel Fritzler	2

Semifinals
(Alberta) Lisa Eyamie	3
(Saskatchewan) Trish Paulsen	7

To Qualifier 4
(Saskatchewan) Trish Paulsen	4
(Manitoba) Jennifer Jones	7
Qualifier 4
(Alberta) Crystal Webster	6
(Manitoba) Jennifer Jones	9

=== C Event ===
Third Knockout
(Switzerland) Manuela Siegrist	1
(Saskatchewan) Brandee Borne	7
(Ontario) Kirsten Wall	9
(Saskatchewan) Brooklyn Lemon	5

Quarterfinals
(Japan) Ayumi Ogasawara	5
(Saskatchewan) Brandee Borne	3
(Alberta) Lisa Eyamie	6
(Ontario) Kirsten Wall	3

Semifinals
(Japan) Ayumi Ogasawara	2
(Alberta) Lisa Eyamie	8

Qualifier 5
(Alberta) Lisa Eyamie	2
(Alberta) Valerie Sweeting	5

Third Knockout
(Saskatchewan) Robyn Silvernagle	7
(Alberta) Morgan Muise	5

Quarterfinals
(Minnesota) Allison Pottinger	3
(Saskatchewan) Rachel Fritzler	5
(Switzerland) Silvana Tirinzoni	5
(Saskatchewan) Robyn Silvernagle	4

Semifinals
(Saskatchewan) Rachel Fritzler	6
(Saskatchewan) Candace Chisholm	8
(Switzerland) Silvana Tirinzoni	6
(Saskatchewan) Jolene Campbell	5

Qualifier 6
(Saskatchewan) Candace Chisholm	2
(Switzerland) Silvana Tirinzoni	10

Third Knockout
(Saskatchewan) Debbie Folk	10
(Saskatchewan) Jill Shumay	5

Quarterfinals
(Alberta) Delia DeJong	7
(Saskatchewan) Debbie Folk	1
(Alberta) Michelle Corbeil	2
(Saskatchewan) Chantelle Eberle	7

Semifinals
(Alberta) Delia DeJong	7
(Saskatchewan) Trish Paulsen	5
(Saskatchewan) Chantelle Eberle	5
(Switzerland) Michèle Jäggi	6

Qualifier 7
(Alberta) Delia DeJong	2
(Switzerland) Michèle Jäggi	7

Third Knockout
(Saskatchewan) Michelle Englot	5
(Alberta) Diane Foster	3
(Saskatchewan) Brett Barber	12
(Saskatchewan) Susan Lang	6

Quarterfinals
(Japan) Shinobu Aota	4
(Saskatchewan) Michelle Englot	6
(Manitoba) Janet Harvey	7
(Saskatchewan) Brett Barber	2

Semifinals
(Saskatchewan) Michelle Englot	5
(Manitoba) Janet Harvey	1

Qualifier 8
(Saskatchewan) Michelle Englot	6
(Alberta) Crystal Webster	7

== Playoffs ==
Quarterfinal
(China) Wang Bingyu	5
(Alberta) Valerie Sweeting	7
(Manitoba) Jennifer Jones	6
(Switzerland) Silvana Tirinzoni	3
(Switzerland) Mirjam Ott	7
(Switzerland) Michèle Jäggi	6
(Saskatchewan) Stefanie Lawton	6
(Alberta) Crystal Webster	7

Semifinal
(Alberta) Valerie Sweeting	6
(Manitoba) Jennifer Jones	3
(Switzerland) Mirjam Ott	6
(Alberta) Crystal Webster	7

Final
(Alberta) Valerie Sweeting	5
(Alberta) Crystal Webster	6
