= 2015 Saskatchewan Scotties Tournament of Hearts =

The 2015 Viterra Saskatchewan Scotties Tournament of Hearts, the provincial women's curling championship of Saskatchewan were held January 21 to 25 at the Assiniboia Curling Club in Assiniboia, Saskatchewan. The winning team was the Stefanie Lawton rink from Saskatoon, who defeated the Michelle Englot rink in the final for the second straight year. Her team represented Saskatchewan at the 2015 Scotties Tournament of Hearts in Moose Jaw.

== Teams ==
The teams are listed as follows:

Skip	Third	Second	Lead	Club(s)
Stefanie Lawton	Sherry Anderson	Sherri Singler	Marliese Kasner	Nutana Curling Club, Saskatoon
Michelle Englot	Candace Chisholm	Ashley Howard	Kirsty Johnson	Highland Curling Club, Regina
Chantelle Eberle	Cindy Ricci	Larisa Murray	Debbie Lozinski	Callie Curling Club, Regina
Trish Paulsen	Jenna Loder	Kari Johanson	Kari Paulsen	Nutana Curling Club, Saskatoon
Brett Barber	Samantha Yachiw	Meaghan Freichs	Kaetlyn Bowman	Biggar Curling Club, Biggar
Penny Barker	Deanna Doig	Amanda Craigie	Danielle Sicinski	Moose Jaw Curling Club, Moose Jaw
Lana Vey	Alexandra Williamson	Natalie Bloomfield	Ashley Williamson	Callie Curling Club, Regina
Jessica Hanson	Kourtney Fesser	Krista Fesser	Brie Spilchen	Granite Curling Club, Saskatoon
Mandy Selzer	Erin Selzer	Kristen Sauter	Sarah Slywka	Balgonie Curling Club, Balgonie
Robyn Silvernagle	Brenda Goertzen (skip)	Cristina Goertzen	Anita Silvernagle	Granite Curling Club, Saskatoon
Shalon Fleming	Ashley Green	Marsha Munro	Ashley Desjardins	Highland Curling Club, Regina
Wendy Thienes	Shelley Rhodes	Della Moffat	Sandra McKellar	Shaunavon Curling Club, Shaunavon

== Round-robin standings ==
Final round-robin standings

Key
Teams to Playoffs

Pool A	W	L
Lawton	5	0
Hanson	4	1
Paulsen	3	2
Barber	2	3
Selzer	1	4
Thienes	0	5

Pool B	W	L
Englot	4	1
Vey	4	1
Eberle	2	3
Barker	2	3
Goertzen	2	3
Fleming	1	4

== Scores ==
=== January 21 ===
Draw 1

- Goertzen 7-4 Fleming
- Selzer 11-4 Thienes

Draw 2

- Englot 7-4 Vey
- Paulsen 9-2 Barber
- Lawton 5-4 Hanson
- Eberle 7-1 Barker

=== January 22 ===
Draw 3

- Paulsen 12-4 Thienes
- Hanson 6-4 Selzer
- Fleming 5-4 Eberle
- Vey 11-4 Goertzen

Draw 4

- Barker 7-6 Goertzen
- Lawton 8-4 Thienes
- Barber 5-4 Selzer
- Englot 6-4 Fleming

=== January 23 ===
Draw 5

- Lawton 6-3 Selzer
- Barker 9-5 Fleming
- Goertzen 8-4 Englot
- Barber 7-4 Thienes

Draw 6

- Englot 8-1 Barker
- Vey 7-6 Eberle
- Lawton 6-3 Barber
- Hanson 7-6 Paulsen

Draw 7

- Eberle 8-6 Goertzen 6
- Hanson 7-2 Thienes
- Paulsen 12-4 Selzer
- Vey 7-4 Fleming

=== January 24 ===
Draw 8

- Hanson 8-4 Barber
- Englot 7-6 Eberle
- Vey 8-5 Barker
- Lawton 6-5 Paulsen

== Playoffs ==
Page playoff system
A1	Stefanie Lawton	4
B1	Michelle Englot	5
A2	Jessica Hanson	5
B2	Lana Vey	6

Semifinal
A1	Stefanie Lawton	8
B2	Lana Vey	6

Final
B1	Michelle Englot	3
A1	Stefanie Lawton	6

=== Final ===
Team	1	2	3	4	5	6	7	8	9	10	Final
Stefanie Lawton	1	0	0	2	0	0	1	0	1	1	6
Michelle Englot	0	0	1	0	1	0	0	1	0	0	3

2015 Saskatchewan Scotties Tournament of Hearts

Stefanie Lawton
4th Saskatchewan Provincial Championship title
