= 2013 Curlers Corner Autumn Gold Curling Classic =

2013 curling tournament

- Host city: Calgary, Alberta
- Arena: Calgary Curling Club
- Dates: October 11–14
- Winner: (Scotland) Eve Muirhead
- Curling club: Dunkeld CC, Pitlochry
- Skip: Eve Muirhead
- Third: Anna Sloan
- Second: Vicki Adams
- Lead: Claire Hamilton
- Finalist: (China) Wang Bingyu

The 2013 Curlers Corner Autumn Gold Curling Classic was held from October 11 to 14 at the Calgary Curling Club in Calgary, Alberta. The event was the first women's Grand Slam of the 2013–14 World Curling Tour. The event was held in a triple knockout format, and the purse for the event was CAD$50,000. The winning team received $14,000.

Eve Muirhead's Scottish rink won the tournament with seven straight victories, a first in the bonspiel's history. She defeated China's Wang Bingyu in the final, which saw the first time the tournament featured two non-Canadian teams in the final. It is also the second straight women's slam to feature two non-Canadian teams in the final, which had only happened one time before in Grand Slam history. Muirhead, who won the 2013 Players' Championship in April, won her second straight slam.

== Teams ==
The teams are listed as follows:

Skip	Third	Second	Lead	Locale
Cathy Auld	Janet Murphy	Stephanie Gray	Melissa Foster	Mississauga, Ontario
Cheryl Bernard	Susan O'Connor	Lori Olson-Johns	Shannon Aleksic	Calgary, Alberta
Erika Brown	Debbie McCormick	Jessica Schultz	Ann Swisshelm	Madison, Wisconsin
Chelsea Carey	Kristy McDonald	Kristen Foster	Lindsay Titheridge	Winnipeg, Manitoba
Laura Crocker	Erin Carmody	Rebecca Pattinson	Jen Gates	Edmonton, Alberta
Lisa Eyamie	Desirée Owen	Jodi Marthaller	Stephanie Malekoff	Grande Prairie, Alberta
Satsuki Fujisawa	Miyo Ichikawa	Emi Shimizu	Miyuki Satoh	Karuizawa, Japan
Tiffany Game	Vanessa Pouliot	Jennifer Van Wieren	Melissa Pierce	Edmonton, Alberta
Teryn Hamilton	Hayley Furst	Jody Keim	Heather Hansen	Calgary, Alberta
Amber Holland	Jolene Campbell	Dailene Sivertson	Brooklyn Lemon	Regina, Saskatchewan
Rachel Homan	Emma Miskew	Alison Kreviazuk	Lisa Weagle	Ottawa, Ontario
Tracy Horgan	Jenn Horgan	Jenna Enge	Amanda Gates	Sudbury, Ontario
Michèle Jäggi	Marisa Winkelhausen	Stéphanie Jäggi	Melanie Barbezat	Bern, Switzerland
Heather Jensen	Darah Provencal	Shana Snell	Morgan Muise	Calgary, Alberta
Jennifer Jones	Kaitlyn Lawes	Jill Officer	Dawn McEwen	Winnipeg, Manitoba
Jessie Kaufman	Tiffany Steuber	Dayna Demmans	Stephanie Enright	Spruce Grove, Alberta
Shannon Kleibrink	Bronwen Webster	Kalynn Park	Chelsey Matson	Calgary, Alberta
Stefanie Lawton	Sherry Anderson	Sherri Singler	Marliese Kasner	Saskatoon, Saskatchewan
Sherry Middaugh	Jo-Ann Rizzo	Lee Merklinger	Leigh Armstrong	Coldwater, Ontario
Eve Muirhead	Anna Sloan	Vicki Adams	Claire Hamilton	Stirling, Scotland
Heather Nedohin	Beth Iskiw	Jessica Mair	Laine Peters	Edmonton, Alberta
Lene Nielsen	Helle Simonsen	Jeanne Ellegaard	Maria Poulsen	Hvidovre, Denmark
Jocelyn Peterman	Brittany Tran	Rebecca Konschuh	Kristine Anderson	Red Deer, Alberta
Casey Scheidegger	Denise Kinghorn	Jessie Scheidegger	Kimberly Anderson	Lethbridge, Alberta
Kelly Scott	Jeanna Schraeder	Sasha Carter	Sarah Wazney	Kelowna, British Columbia
Jill Shumay	Kara Johnston	Taryn Holtby	Jinaye Ayrey	Maidstone, Saskatchewan
Anna Sidorova	Liudmila Privivkova	Margarita Fomina	Ekaterina Galkina	Moscow, Russia
Renée Sonnenberg	Lawnie McDonald	Cary-Anne McTaggart	Rona Pasika	Grande Prairie, Alberta
Barb Spencer	Katie Spencer	Ainsley Champagne	Raunora Westcott	Winnipeg, Manitoba
Valerie Sweeting	Dana Ferguson	Joanne Taylor	Rachelle Pidherny	Edmonton, Alberta
Wang Bingyu	Liu Yin	Yue Qingshuang	Zhou Yan	Harbin, China
Crystal Webster	Cathy Overton-Clapham	Geri-Lynn Ramsay	Samantha Preston	Calgary, Alberta

== Knockout results ==
The draw is listed as follows:

=== A event ===
First Knockout
(Ontario) Rachel Homan	4
(Alberta) Jocelyn Peterman	3
(Alberta) Valerie Sweeting	7
(British Columbia) Kelly Scott	1
(Ontario) Sherry Middaugh	4
(Alberta) Casey Scheidegger	6
(Alberta) Shannon Kleibrink	6
(Manitoba) Barb Spencer	2
(Scotland) Eve Muirhead	9
(Alberta) Jessie Kaufman	1
(Alberta) Cheryl Bernard	4
(Ontario) Cathy Auld	7
(Russia) Anna Sidorova	4
(Alberta) Lisa Eyamie	5
(Wisconsin) Erika Brown	3
(Ontario) Tracy Horgan	4

Quarterfinals
(Ontario) Rachel Homan	7
(Alberta) Valerie Sweeting	3
(Alberta) Casey Scheidegger	3
(Alberta) Shannon Kleibrink	8
(Scotland) Eve Muirhead	7
(Ontario) Cathy Auld	4
(Alberta) Lisa Eyamie	4
(Ontario) Tracy Horgan	3

Semifinals
(Ontario) Rachel Homan	7
(Alberta) Shannon Kleibrink	5
(Scotland) Eve Muirhead	7
(Alberta) Lisa Eyamie	4

Qualifier 1
(Ontario) Rachel Homan	4
(Scotland) Eve Muirhead	6

First Knockout
(Manitoba) Jennifer Jones	6
(Alberta) Teryn Hamilton	3
(Saskatchewan) Amber Holland	8
(Alberta) Crystal Webster	6
(Manitoba) Chelsea Carey	4
(Saskatchewan) Jill Shumay	3
(Alberta) Renée Sonnenberg	4
(China) Wang Bingyu	8
(Saskatchewan) Stefanie Lawton	8
(Alberta) Heather Jensen	1
(Switzerland) Michèle Jäggi	8
(Denmark) Lene Nielsen	4
(Alberta) Heather Nedohin	6
(Alberta) Tiffany Game	5
(Alberta) Laura Crocker	5
(Japan) Satsuki Fujisawa	0

Quarterfinals
(Manitoba) Jennifer Jones	6
(Saskatchewan) Amber Holland	3
(Manitoba) Chelsea Carey	5
(China) Wang Bingyu	7
(Saskatchewan) Stefanie Lawton	6
(Switzerland) Michèle Jäggi	5
(Alberta) Heather Nedohin	3
(Alberta) Laura Crocker	5

Semifinals
(Manitoba) Jennifer Jones	7
(China) Wang Bingyu	6
(Saskatchewan) Stefanie Lawton	6
(Alberta) Laura Crocker	4

Qualifier 2
(Manitoba) Jennifer Jones	3
(Saskatchewan) Stefanie Lawton	7

=== B event ===
Second Knockout
(Alberta) Jocelyn Peterman	2
(British Columbia) Kelly Scott	7
(Ontario) Sherry Middaugh	3
(Manitoba) Barb Spencer	6

Quarterfinals
(Alberta) Heather Nedohin	7
(British Columbia) Kelly Scott	3
(Switzerland) Michèle Jäggi	4
(Manitoba) Barb Spencer	3

Semifinals
(Alberta) Heather Nedohin	5
(China) Wang Bingyu	3
(Switzerland) Michèle Jäggi	7
(Alberta) Lisa Eyamie	3

To Qualifier 3
(Alberta) Heather Nedohin	5
(Switzerland) Michèle Jäggi	6
Qualifier 3
(Switzerland) Michèle Jäggi	6
(Ontario) Rachel Homan	4

Second Knockout
(Alberta) Jessie Kaufman	1
(Alberta) Cheryl Bernard	9
(Russia) Anna Sidorova	7
(Wisconsin) Erika Brown	6

Quarterfinals
(Manitoba) Chelsea Carey	9
(Alberta) Cheryl Bernard	5
(Saskatchewan) Amber Holland	3
(Russia) Anna Sidorova	6

Semifinals
(Manitoba) Chelsea Carey	5
(Russia) Anna Sidorova	2

To Qualifier 3
(Manitoba) Chelsea Carey	2
(Ontario) Rachel Homan	8

Second Knockout
(Alberta) Teryn Hamilton	4
(Alberta) Crystal Webster	6
(Saskatchewan) Jill Shumay	8
(Alberta) Renée Sonnenberg	4

Quarterfinals
(Ontario) Tracy Horgan	4
(Alberta) Crystal Webster	6
(Ontario) Cathy Auld	9
(Saskatchewan) Jill Shumay	3

Semifinals
(Alberta) Crystal Webster	3
(Alberta) Laura Crocker	6
(Ontario) Cathy Auld	7
(Alberta) Shannon Kleibrink	6

To Qualifier 4
(Alberta) Laura Crocker	8
(Ontario) Cathy Auld	3
Qualifier 4
(Alberta) Laura Crocker	2
(Alberta) Valerie Sweeting	8

Second Knockout
(Alberta) Heather Jensen	4
(Denmark) Lene Nielsen	5
(Alberta) Tiffany Game	2
(Japan) Satsuki Fujisawa	5

Quarterfinals
(Alberta) Casey Scheidegger	4
(Denmark) Lene Nielsen	6
(Alberta) Valerie Sweeting	6
(Japan) Satsuki Fujisawa	4

Semifinals
(Denmark) Lene Nielsen	5
(Alberta) Valerie Sweeting	7

To Qualifier 4
(Alberta) Valerie Sweeting	6
(Manitoba) Jennifer Jones	4

=== C event ===
Third Knockout
(Alberta) Jocelyn Peterman	3
(Ontario) Sherry Middaugh	5
(Alberta) Jessie Kaufman	4
(Wisconsin) Erika Brown	5

Quarterfinals
(Alberta) Crystal Webster	5
(Ontario) Sherry Middaugh	6
(Alberta) Shannon Kleibrink	7
(Wisconsin) Erika Brown	2

Semifinals
(Ontario) Sherry Middaugh	3
(Alberta) Shannon Kleibrink	5

Qualifier 5
(Alberta) Shannon Kleibrink	2
(Ontario) Rachel Homan	3

Third Knockout
(Alberta) Cheryl Bernard	5
(Saskatchewan) Amber Holland	4

Quarterfinals
(British Columbia) Kelly Scott	5
(Manitoba) Barb Spencer	4
(Denmark) Lene Nielsen	5
(Alberta) Cheryl Bernard	6

Semifinals
(British Columbia) Kelly Scott	3
(Manitoba) Jennifer Jones	9
(Alberta) Cheryl Bernard	5
(Ontario) Cathy Auld	3

Qualifier 6
(Manitoba) Jennifer Jones	4
(Alberta) Cheryl Bernard	1

Third Knockout
(Alberta) Casey Scheidegger	2
(Japan) Satsuki Fujisawa	8

Quarterfinals
(Russia) Anna Sidorova	1
(Japan) Satsuki Fujisawa	8
(Ontario) Tracy Horgan	5
(Saskatchewan) Jill Shumay	6

Semifinals
(Japan) Satsuki Fujisawa	4
(Alberta) Heather Nedohin	7
(Saskatchewan) Jill Shumay	3
(Manitoba) Chelsea Carey	6

Qualifier 7
(Alberta) Heather Nedohin	5
(Manitoba) Chelsea Carey	4

Third Knockout
(Alberta) Teryn Hamilton	6
(Alberta) Renée Sonnenberg	5
(Alberta) Heather Jensen	8
(Alberta) Tiffany Game	5

Quarterfinals
(China) Wang Bingyu	8
(Alberta) Teryn Hamilton	2
(Alberta) Lisa Eyamie	6
(Alberta) Heather Jensen	5

Semifinals
(China) Wang Bingyu	9
(Alberta) Lisa Eyamie	6

Qualifier 8
(China) Wang Bingyu	7
(Alberta) Laura Crocker	5

== Playoffs ==
Quarterfinals
(Scotland) Eve Muirhead	7
(Manitoba) Jennifer Jones	6
(Alberta) Valerie Sweeting	4
(Ontario) Rachel Homan	5
(China) Wang Bingyu	7
(Switzerland) Michèle Jäggi	6
(Alberta) Heather Nedohin	3
(Saskatchewan) Stefanie Lawton	6

Semifinals
(Scotland) Eve Muirhead	4
(Ontario) Rachel Homan	3
(China) Wang Bingyu	8
(Saskatchewan) Stefanie Lawton	2

Final
(Scotland) Eve Muirhead	8
(China) Wang Bingyu	3
