= 2014 Players' Championship =

Grand Slam of Curling event

- Host city: Summerside, Prince Edward Island
- Arena: Consolidated Credit Union Place
- Dates: April 15–20
- Men's winner: (Alberta) Kevin Martin
- Curling club: Saville SC, Edmonton
- Skip: Kevin Martin
- Third: Marc Kennedy
- Second: David Nedohin
- Lead: Ben Hebert
- Finalist: (Ontario) Brad Jacobs
- Women's winner: (Manitoba) Jennifer Jones
- Curling club: St. Vital CC, Winnipeg
- Skip: Jennifer Jones
- Third: Kaitlyn Lawes
- Second: Jill Officer
- Lead: Dawn McEwen
- Finalist: (Ontario) Rachel Homan

The 2014 Players' Championship was held from April 15 to 20 at the Consolidated Credit Union Place in Summerside, Prince Edward Island. It was the fourth and final Grand Slam of the 2013–14 World Curling Tour.

On the men's side, Edmonton's Kevin Martin won a record eighth Players' Championship, which was his final Players' win before retirement. On the women's side, Winnipeg's Jennifer Jones won a record fifth Players' title.

== Men ==
=== Teams ===
The teams are listed as follows:

Skip	Third	Second	Lead	Locale
Niklas Edin	Sebastian Kraupp	Fredrik Lindberg	Viktor Kjäll	Karlstad, Sweden
John Epping	Travis Fanset	Patrick Janssen	Tim March	Toronto, Ontario
Brad Gushue	Brett Gallant	Adam Casey	Geoff Walker	St. John's, Newfoundland and Labrador
Glenn Howard	Wayne Middaugh	Brent Laing	Craig Savill	Penetanguishene, Ontario
Brad Jacobs	Ryan Fry	E. J. Harnden	Ryan Harnden	Sault Ste. Marie, Ontario
Kevin Koe	Pat Simmons	Carter Rycroft	Nolan Thiessen	Calgary, Alberta
Steve Laycock	Kirk Muyres	Colton Flasch	Dallan Muyres	Saskatoon, Saskatchewan
Kevin Martin	Marc Kennedy	David Nedohin	Ben Hebert	Edmonton, Alberta
Mike McEwen	B. J. Neufeld	Matt Wozniak	Denni Neufeld	Winnipeg, Manitoba
Sven Michel	Claudio Pätz	Sandro Trolliet	Simon Gempeler	Adelboden, Switzerland
David Murdoch	Greg Drummond	Scott Andrews	Michael Goodfellow	Stirling, Scotland
Jeff Stoughton	Jon Mead	Mark Nichols	Reid Carruthers	Winnipeg, Manitoba

=== Round-robin standings ===
Final round-robin standings

Pool A	W	L	PF	PA
(Manitoba) Mike McEwen	5	0	33	21
(Ontario) John Epping	3	2	28	22
(Ontario) Brad Jacobs	3	2	31	27
(Sweden) Niklas Edin	2	3	25	29
(Manitoba) Jeff Stoughton	2	3	23	24
(Switzerland) Sven Michel	0	5	14	31

Pool B	W	L	PF	PA
(Newfoundland and Labrador) Brad Gushue	4	1	28	11
(Alberta) Kevin Koe	4	1	33	26
(Alberta) Kevin Martin	3	2	23	22
(Scotland) David Murdoch	2	3	20	25
(Ontario) Glenn Howard	1	4	15	24
(Saskatchewan) Steve Laycock	1	4	22	28

=== Round-robin results ===
All times listed in Atlantic Daylight Time (UTC−03).

==== Draw 1 ====
Tuesday, April 15, 7:00 pm

Sheet C	1	2	3	4	5	6	7	8	Final
(Manitoba) Mike McEwen 🔨	2	0	0	0	2	0	2	X	6
(Switzerland) Sven Michel	0	1	1	1	0	1	0	X	4

Sheet E	1	2	3	4	5	6	7	8	Final
(Alberta) Kevin Koe 🔨	2	0	1	2	0	1	0	1	7
(Saskatchewan) Steve Laycock	0	1	0	0	3	0	2	0	6

==== Draw 3 ====
Wednesday, April 16, 1:00 pm

Sheet A	1	2	3	4	5	6	7	8	Final
(Ontario) Brad Jacobs 🔨	2	1	0	1	0	0	0	2	6
(Switzerland) Sven Michel	0	0	1	0	1	1	1	0	4

Sheet B	1	2	3	4	5	6	7	8	Final
(Ontario) Glenn Howard	0	1	0	2	0	0	1	0	4
(Alberta) Kevin Martin 🔨	1	0	2	0	2	0	0	1	6

Sheet C	1	2	3	4	5	6	7	8	Final
(Scotland) David Murdoch	0	0	1	0	0	1	0	X	2
(Newfoundland and Labrador) Brad Gushue 🔨	2	1	0	0	2	0	2	X	7

Sheet D	1	2	3	4	5	6	7	8	Final
(Sweden) Niklas Edin	0	0	2	0	0	1	0	X	3
(Manitoba) Mike McEwen 🔨	2	1	0	1	1	0	3	X	8

Sheet E	1	2	3	4	5	6	7	8	Final
(Manitoba) Jeff Stoughton 🔨	1	0	1	0	1	0	0	1	4
(Ontario) John Epping	0	1	0	1	0	1	0	0	3

==== Draw 5 ====
Wednesday, April 16, 8:30 pm

Sheet A	1	2	3	4	5	6	7	8	Final
(Manitoba) Jeff Stoughton	0	2	0	1	0	1	0	1	5
(Sweden) Niklas Edin 🔨	3	0	2	0	0	0	2	0	7

Sheet B	1	2	3	4	5	6	7	8	Final
(Alberta) Kevin Koe	0	3	0	1	1	0	1	1	7
(Scotland) David Murdoch 🔨	1	0	1	0	0	1	0	0	3

Sheet C	1	2	3	4	5	6	7	8	Final
(Ontario) Glenn Howard 🔨	2	0	0	2	0	0	0	0	4
(Saskatchewan) Steve Laycock	0	1	0	0	0	1	1	0	3

Sheet D	1	2	3	4	5	6	7	8	Final
(Ontario) Brad Jacobs 🔨	2	0	1	0	0	2	0	0	5
(Ontario) John Epping	0	2	0	2	2	0	0	2	8

Sheet E	1	2	3	4	5	6	7	8	Final
(Alberta) Kevin Martin	0	2	0	1	0	0	1	0	4
(Newfoundland and Labrador) Brad Gushue 🔨	1	0	2	0	1	1	0	1	6

==== Draw 6 ====
Thursday, April 17, 9:30 am

Sheet A	1	2	3	4	5	6	7	8	Final
(Ontario) Glenn Howard	0	1	0	0	0	0	X	X	1
(Newfoundland and Labrador) Brad Gushue 🔨	1	0	0	3	1	2	X	X	7

Sheet E	1	2	3	4	5	6	7	8	Final
(Sweden) Niklas Edin 🔨	3	1	1	0	2	X	X	X	7
(Switzerland) Sven Michel	0	0	0	2	0	X	X	X	2

==== Draw 7 ====
Thursday, April 17, 1:00 pm

Sheet A	1	2	3	4	5	6	7	8	Final
(Alberta) Kevin Martin	1	0	0	2	0	0	0	0	3
(Saskatchewan) Steve Laycock 🔨	0	2	0	0	1	2	1	1	7

Sheet B	1	2	3	4	5	6	7	8	Final
(Manitoba) Mike McEwen	0	2	1	0	0	1	0	1	5
(Manitoba) Jeff Stoughton 🔨	1	0	0	2	0	0	1	0	4

==== Draw 8 ====
Thursday, April 17, 5:00 pm

Sheet A	1	2	3	4	5	6	7	8	9	Final
(Ontario) Brad Jacobs	0	0	0	2	1	0	1	0	3	7
(Sweden) Niklas Edin 🔨	1	1	1	0	0	0	0	1	0	4

Sheet B	1	2	3	4	5	6	7	8	Final
(Switzerland) Sven Michel	0	0	1	0	1	0	0	X	2
(Ontario) John Epping 🔨	3	1	0	1	0	0	1	X	6

Sheet C	1	2	3	4	5	6	7	8	Final
(Ontario) Glenn Howard	0	2	0	0	1	1	0	0	4
(Scotland) David Murdoch 🔨	1	0	0	3	0	0	1	1	6

Sheet D	1	2	3	4	5	6	7	8	Final
(Newfoundland and Labrador) Brad Gushue 🔨	0	3	0	1	0	2	0	0	6
(Alberta) Kevin Koe	0	0	2	0	2	0	3	2	9

==== Draw 10 ====
Friday, April 18, 9:30 am

Sheet D	1	2	3	4	5	6	7	8	Final
(Ontario) John Epping 🔨	0	2	0	0	2	0	0	X	4
(Manitoba) Mike McEwen	2	0	1	1	0	2	1	X	7

==== Draw 11 ====
Friday, April 18, 1:00 pm

Sheet B	1	2	3	4	5	6	7	8	Final
(Alberta) Kevin Martin 🔨	1	0	0	1	2	0	0	1	5
(Scotland) David Murdoch	0	0	2	0	0	1	0	0	3

Sheet D	1	2	3	4	5	6	7	8	Final
(Alberta) Kevin Koe	0	0	4	0	1	0	2	1	8
(Ontario) Glenn Howard 🔨	0	2	0	2	0	2	0	0	6

Sheet E	1	2	3	4	5	6	7	8	Final
(Saskatchewan) Steve Laycock 🔨	1	0	1	0	2	0	0	X	4
(Newfoundland and Labrador) Brad Gushue	0	1	0	4	0	1	2	X	8

==== Draw 12 ====
Friday, April 18, 5:00 pm

Sheet C	1	2	3	4	5	6	7	8	Final
(Alberta) Kevin Koe	0	1	0	1	0	0	0	X	2
(Alberta) Kevin Martin 🔨	1	0	1	0	1	1	1	X	5

Sheet D	1	2	3	4	5	6	7	8	Final
(Manitoba) Jeff Stoughton 🔨	0	2	2	1	0	0	1	X	6
(Switzerland) Sven Michel	0	0	0	0	1	1	0	X	2

Sheet E	1	2	3	4	5	6	7	8	Final
(Ontario) Brad Jacobs 🔨	1	0	3	0	1	0	1	0	6
(Manitoba) Mike McEwen	0	1	0	4	0	1	0	1	7

==== Draw 13 ====
Friday, April 18, 8:30 pm

Sheet B	1	2	3	4	5	6	7	8	Final
(Sweden) Niklas Edin 🔨	0	1	0	1	0	2	0	X	4
(Ontario) John Epping	2	0	2	0	2	0	1	X	7

Sheet C	1	2	3	4	5	6	7	8	Final
(Ontario) Brad Jacobs 🔨	2	0	0	2	0	3	0	X	7
(Manitoba) Jeff Stoughton	0	0	1	0	2	0	1	X	4

Sheet D	1	2	3	4	5	6	7	8	Final
(Scotland) David Murdoch	0	1	0	2	3	0	X	X	6
(Saskatchewan) Steve Laycock 🔨	0	0	1	0	0	1	X	X	2

=== Playoffs ===
Quarterfinals
(Alberta) Kevin Martin	6
(Ontario) John Epping	4
(Alberta) Kevin Koe	6
(Ontario) Brad Jacobs	7

Semifinals
(Manitoba) Mike McEwen	5
(Alberta) Kevin Martin	6
(Newfoundland and Labrador) Brad Gushue	4
(Ontario) Brad Jacobs	6

Final
(Alberta) Kevin Martin	4
(Ontario) Brad Jacobs	3

==== Quarterfinals ====
Saturday, April 19, 5:00 pm

Team	1	2	3	4	5	6	7	8	Final
(Alberta) Kevin Martin 🔨	1	0	0	0	2	0	2	1	6
(Ontario) John Epping	0	2	0	0	0	2	0	0	4

Team	1	2	3	4	5	6	7	8	Final
(Alberta) Kevin Koe 🔨	2	0	0	0	2	0	2	0	6
(Ontario) Brad Jacobs	0	2	1	0	0	2	0	2	7

==== Semifinals ====
Saturday, April 19, 8:30 pm

Team	1	2	3	4	5	6	7	8	9	Final
(Manitoba) Mike McEwen 🔨	1	0	2	0	1	0	0	1	0	5
(Alberta) Kevin Martin	0	2	0	2	0	1	0	0	1	6

Team	1	2	3	4	5	6	7	8	Final
(Newfoundland and Labrador) Brad Gushue 🔨	1	0	1	0	2	0	0	X	4
(Ontario) Brad Jacobs	0	2	0	1	0	3	0	X	6

==== Final ====
Sunday, April 20, 5:00 pm

Team	1	2	3	4	5	6	7	8	Final
(Alberta) Kevin Martin 🔨	0	2	0	2	0	0	0	0	4
(Ontario) Brad Jacobs	0	0	1	0	0	0	1	1	3

== Women ==
=== Teams ===
The teams are listed as follows:

Skip	Third	Second	Lead	Locale
Julie Hastings	Cheryl McPherson	Stacey Smith	Katrina Collins	Thornhill, Ontario
Rachel Homan	Emma Miskew	Alison Kreviazuk	Lisa Weagle	Ottawa, Ontario
Michèle Jäggi	Carine Mattille	Stéphanie Jäggi	Emilie Mattille	Bern, Switzerland
Jennifer Jones	Kaitlyn Lawes	Jill Officer	Dawn McEwen	(Manitoba) Winnipeg
Stefanie Lawton	Sherry Anderson	Sherri Singler	Marliese Kasner	Saskatoon, Saskatchewan
Sherry Middaugh	Jo-Ann Rizzo	Lee Merklinger	Leigh Armstrong	Coldwater, Ontario
Eve Muirhead	Anna Sloan	Vicki Adams	Claire Hamilton	Stirling, Scotland
Heather Nedohin	Beth Iskiw	Mary-Anne Arsenault	Laine Peters	Edmonton, Alberta
Maria Prytz (fourth)	Christina Bertrup	Maria Wennerström	Margaretha Sigfridsson (skip)	Härnösand, Sweden
Valerie Sweeting	Laura Crocker	Dana Ferguson	Rachelle Pidherny	Edmonton, Alberta
Silvana Tirinzoni	Manuela Siegrist	Esther Neuenschwander	Marlene Albrecht	Aarau, Switzerland
Crystal Webster	Cathy Overton-Clapham	Geri-Lynn Ramsay	Jen Gates	Calgary, Alberta

=== Round-robin standings ===
Final round-robin standings

Pool A	W	L	PF	PA
(Switzerland) Silvana Tirinzoni	4	1	30	25
(Sweden) Margaretha Sigfridsson	4	1	33	24
(Manitoba) Jennifer Jones	3	2	27	30
(Ontario) Sherry Middaugh	2	3	29	26
(Ontario) Julie Hastings	1	4	29	33
(Alberta) Valerie Sweeting	1	4	27	35

Pool B	W	L	PF	PA
(Scotland) Eve Muirhead	4	1	40	23
(Ontario) Rachel Homan	3	2	28	22
(Saskatchewan) Stefanie Lawton	3	2	27	25
(Alberta) Crystal Webster	2	3	20	28
(Alberta) Heather Nedohin	2	3	20	27
(Switzerland) Michèle Jäggi	1	4	26	30

=== Round-robin results ===
All times listed in Atlantic Daylight Time (UTC−03).

==== Draw 1 ====
Tuesday, April 15, 7:00 pm

Sheet A	1	2	3	4	5	6	7	8	Final
(Manitoba) Jennifer Jones 🔨	0	2	2	0	1	0	0	0	5
(Switzerland) Silvana Tirinzoni	1	0	0	1	0	2	1	1	6

Sheet B	1	2	3	4	5	6	7	8	Final
(Alberta) Heather Nedohin	0	0	1	0	1	0	X	X	2
(Ontario) Rachel Homan 🔨	1	2	0	3	0	1	X	X	7

Sheet D	1	2	3	4	5	6	7	8	Final
(Scotland) Eve Muirhead 🔨	2	0	2	0	2	1	0	X	7
(Switzerland) Michèle Jäggi	0	2	0	1	0	0	2	X	5

==== Draw 2 ====
Wednesday, April 16, 9:30 am

Sheet A	1	2	3	4	5	6	7	8	9	Final
(Switzerland) Michèle Jäggi	0	1	0	0	0	1	0	2	0	4
(Alberta) Crystal Webster 🔨	0	0	0	1	2	0	1	0	3	7

Sheet B	1	2	3	4	5	6	7	8	Final
(Alberta) Valerie Sweeting 🔨	0	3	0	1	0	1	0	3	8
(Ontario) Sherry Middaugh	0	0	2	0	3	0	2	0	7

Sheet C	1	2	3	4	5	6	7	8	Final
(Sweden) Margaretha Sigfridsson 🔨	0	1	0	1	1	0	2	1	6
(Ontario) Julie Hastings	0	0	2	0	0	1	0	0	3

Sheet D	1	2	3	4	5	6	7	8	Final
(Alberta) Heather Nedohin 🔨	0	1	0	0	0	0	0	X	1
(Saskatchewan) Stefanie Lawton	1	0	1	0	1	2	0	X	5

==== Draw 4 ====
Wednesday, April 16, 4:30 pm

Sheet A	1	2	3	4	5	6	7	8	Final
(Alberta) Valerie Sweeting 🔨	2	0	1	0	1	2	0	0	6
(Sweden) Margaretha Sigfridsson	0	3	0	2	0	0	2	3	10

Sheet B	1	2	3	4	5	6	7	8	Final
(Scotland) Eve Muirhead	0	2	2	0	1	0	6	X	11
(Saskatchewan) Stefanie Lawton 🔨	1	0	0	2	0	1	0	X	4

Sheet C	1	2	3	4	5	6	7	8	Final
(Ontario) Rachel Homan 🔨	0	3	3	0	2	X	X	X	8
(Alberta) Crystal Webster	0	0	0	1	0	X	X	X	1

Sheet D	1	2	3	4	5	6	7	8	Final
(Switzerland) Silvana Tirinzoni 🔨	0	1	0	0	4	0	1	0	6
(Ontario) Sherry Middaugh	0	0	0	1	0	1	0	2	4

Sheet E	1	2	3	4	5	6	7	8	9	Final
(Manitoba) Jennifer Jones	0	2	0	4	0	2	0	0	1	9
(Ontario) Julie Hastings 🔨	1	0	1	0	2	0	2	2	0	8

==== Draw 6 ====
Thursday, April 17, 9:30 am

Sheet B	1	2	3	4	5	6	7	8	Final
(Ontario) Julie Hastings	2	0	0	1	1	0	1	0	5
(Switzerland) Silvana Tirinzoni 🔨	0	2	2	0	0	1	0	1	6

Sheet C	1	2	3	4	5	6	7	8	Final
(Saskatchewan) Stefanie Lawton	0	0	1	1	0	2	0	X	4
(Switzerland) Michèle Jäggi 🔨	1	3	0	0	1	0	3	X	8

Sheet D	1	2	3	4	5	6	7	8	9	Final
(Alberta) Crystal Webster	0	1	0	0	1	0	2	0	1	5
(Alberta) Heather Nedohin 🔨	1	0	0	0	0	2	0	1	0	4

==== Draw 7 ====
Thursday, April 17, 1:00 pm

Sheet C	1	2	3	4	5	6	7	8	Final
(Ontario) Rachel Homan	0	2	0	1	0	1	0	X	4
(Scotland) Eve Muirhead 🔨	2	0	2	0	2	0	1	X	7

Sheet D	1	2	3	4	5	6	7	8	Final
(Manitoba) Jennifer Jones 🔨	0	0	2	1	0	1	0	1	5
(Alberta) Valerie Sweeting	0	0	0	0	1	0	2	0	3

Sheet E	1	2	3	4	5	6	7	8	Final
(Sweden) Margaretha Sigfridsson 🔨	1	0	2	0	1	0	1	X	5
(Ontario) Sherry Middaugh	0	1	0	1	0	1	0	X	3

==== Draw 8 ====
Thursday, April 17, 5:00 pm

Sheet E	1	2	3	4	5	6	7	8	Final
(Alberta) Heather Nedohin	0	2	0	1	0	1	0	1	5
(Switzerland) Michèle Jäggi 🔨	0	0	2	0	1	0	1	0	4

==== Draw 9 ====
Thursday, April 17, 8:30 pm

Sheet A	1	2	3	4	5	6	7	8	Final
(Ontario) Julie Hastings	0	2	0	0	2	0	2	X	6
(Ontario) Sherry Middaugh 🔨	1	0	2	2	0	3	0	X	8

Sheet B	1	2	3	4	5	6	7	8	Final
(Saskatchewan) Stefanie Lawton 🔨	2	0	3	2	0	X	X	X	7
(Ontario) Rachel Homan	0	1	0	0	1	X	X	X	2

Sheet C	1	2	3	4	5	6	7	8	Final
(Manitoba) Jennifer Jones	1	0	3	0	2	0	0	1	7
(Sweden) Margaretha Sigfridsson 🔨	0	3	0	2	0	1	0	0	6

Sheet D	1	2	3	4	5	6	7	8	Final
(Alberta) Crystal Webster	0	1	0	1	0	X	X	X	2
(Scotland) Eve Muirhead 🔨	3	0	3	0	3	X	X	X	9

Sheet E	1	2	3	4	5	6	7	8	Final
(Switzerland) Silvana Tirinzoni 🔨	1	0	1	0	0	3	0	2	7
(Alberta) Valerie Sweeting	0	1	0	3	0	0	1	0	5

==== Draw 10 ====
Friday, April 18, 9:30 am

Sheet A	1	2	3	4	5	6	7	8	Final
(Ontario) Rachel Homan	0	0	2	1	0	1	0	3	7
(Switzerland) Michèle Jäggi 🔨	0	2	0	0	1	0	2	0	5

Sheet B	1	2	3	4	5	6	7	8	Final
(Switzerland) Silvana Tirinzoni	0	0	2	0	2	0	1	0	5
(Sweden) Margaretha Sigfridsson 🔨	0	1	0	2	0	1	0	2	6

Sheet C	1	2	3	4	5	6	7	8	Final
(Scotland) Eve Muirhead 🔨	0	2	0	1	0	1	2	0	6
(Alberta) Heather Nedohin	0	0	4	0	2	0	0	2	8

Sheet E	1	2	3	4	5	6	7	8	Final
(Ontario) Sherry Middaugh 🔨	1	1	1	3	0	1	X	X	7
(Manitoba) Jennifer Jones	0	0	0	0	1	0	X	X	1

==== Draw 11 ====
Friday, April 18, 1:00 pm

Sheet A	1	2	3	4	5	6	7	8	Final
(Saskatchewan) Stefanie Lawton	0	2	0	0	1	0	2	0	5
(Alberta) Crystal Webster 🔨	0	0	1	0	0	1	0	1	3

Sheet C	1	2	3	4	5	6	7	8	9	Final
(Ontario) Julie Hastings	0	0	2	1	0	1	1	0	1	6
(Alberta) Valerie Sweeting 🔨	1	1	0	0	2	0	0	1	0	5

=== Playoffs ===
Quarterfinals
(Saskatchewan) Stefanie Lawton	5
(Ontario) Rachel Homan	7
(Scotland) Eve Muirhead	5
(Manitoba) Jennifer Jones	7

Semifinals
(Switzerland) Silvana Tirinzoni	3
(Ontario) Rachel Homan	4
(Sweden) Margaretha Sigfridsson	7
(Manitoba) Jennifer Jones	8

Final
(Ontario) Rachel Homan	2
(Manitoba) Jennifer Jones	5

==== Quarterfinals ====
Saturday, April 19, 1:00 pm

Team	1	2	3	4	5	6	7	8	Final
(Saskatchewan) Stefanie Lawton 🔨	1	0	1	0	2	0	1	0	5
(Ontario) Rachel Homan	0	1	0	1	0	3	0	2	7

Team	1	2	3	4	5	6	7	8	9	Final
(Scotland) Eve Muirhead 🔨	3	0	0	0	0	2	0	0	0	5
(Manitoba) Jennifer Jones	0	1	0	1	1	0	0	2	2	7

==== Semifinals ====
Saturday, April 19, 8:30 pm

Team	1	2	3	4	5	6	7	8	9	Final
(Switzerland) Silvana Tirinzoni 🔨	0	0	0	1	0	1	0	1	0	3
(Ontario) Rachel Homan	1	0	1	0	0	0	1	0	1	4

Team	1	2	3	4	5	6	7	8	9	Final
(Sweden) Margaretha Sigfridsson 🔨	1	0	2	0	1	0	2	1	0	7
(Manitoba) Jennifer Jones	0	2	0	3	0	2	0	0	1	8

==== Final ====
Sunday, April 20, 11:00 am

Team	1	2	3	4	5	6	7	8	Final
(Ontario) Rachel Homan 🔨	0	1	0	0	1	0	0	0	2
(Manitoba) Jennifer Jones	1	0	2	0	0	1	0	1	5
