= 2013 Canadian Olympic Curling Trials =

Sports event

- Host city: Winnipeg, Manitoba
- Arena: MTS Centre
- Dates: December 1–8
- Attendance: 136,771
- Men's winner: (Ontario) Brad Jacobs
- Curling club: Soo CA, Sault Ste. Marie
- Skip: Brad Jacobs
- Third: Ryan Fry
- Second: E. J. Harnden
- Lead: Ryan Harnden
- Alternate: Caleb Flaxey
- Coach: Tom Coulterman
- Finalist: (British Columbia) John Morris
- Women's winner: (Manitoba) Jennifer Jones
- Curling club: St. Vital CC, Winnipeg
- Skip: Jennifer Jones
- Third: Kaitlyn Lawes
- Second: Jill Officer
- Lead: Dawn McEwen
- Alternate: Kirsten Wall
- Coach: Janet Arnott
- Finalist: (Ontario) Sherry Middaugh

The 2013 Canadian Olympic Curling Trials (branded as the 2013 Tim Hortons Roar of the Rings for sponsorship reasons) were held from December 1 to 8 at the MTS Centre in Winnipeg, Manitoba. The winners of the men's and women's events were chosen to represent Canada at the 2014 Winter Olympics.

== Qualification process ==
The qualification process for the 2013 Olympic trials differed slightly from the process used at the 2009 Trials. For both the men's and women's events, a pool of 18 teams were designated as eligible to represent Canada at the 2014 Winter Olympics, based on rankings from the Canadian Team Ranking System (CTRS). From the pool of 18, six teams were selected to qualify directly to the Trials. The 12 remaining teams competed in a pre-trial tournament from November 5–10 in Kitchener, where the top two teams in each division qualified to the eight-team draw for the Trials proper.

=== Men ===
Qualification method	Qualifying team	Scenario if team has already qualified
Winner of 2011 Canada Cup	Kevin Martin	None (first qualifier)
CTRS Leader for 2011–12 Season	Glenn Howard	Runner up on 2011–12 CTRS
Winner of 2012 Canada Cup	Jeff Stoughton	Next team on the 2012–13 CTRS not already qualified
CTRS Leader for 2012–13 Season	Kevin Koe	Next team on the 2012–13 CTRS not already qualified
CTRS Leader for 2011–13 (two year total)	Mike McEwen	Next team on the 2011–13 CTRS not already qualified
CTRS Runner-up for 2011–13 (two year total)	John Epping	Next team on the 2011–13 CTRS not already qualified
Qualification tournament	Brad Jacobs	
Qualification tournament	John Morris	

=== Women ===
Qualification method	Qualifying team	Scenario if team has already qualified
Winner of 2011 Canada Cup	Jennifer Jones	None (first qualifier)
CTRS Leader for 2011–12 Season	Heather Nedohin	Runner up on 2011–12 CTRS
Winner of 2012 Canada Cup	Stefanie Lawton	Next team on the 2012–13 CTRS not already qualified
CTRS Leader for 2012–13 Season	Rachel Homan	Next team on the 2012–13 CTRS not already qualified
CTRS Leader for 2011–13 (two year total)	Sherry Middaugh	Next team on the 2011–13 CTRS not already qualified
CTRS Runner-up for 2011–13 (two year total)	Chelsea Carey	Next team on the 2011–13 CTRS not already qualified
Qualification tournament	Renée Sonnenberg	
Qualification tournament	Val Sweeting	

== Men ==
=== Teams ===
The teams are listed as follows:

Skip	Third	Second	Lead	Alternate	Locale
Kevin Martin	David Nedohin	Marc Kennedy	Ben Hebert	Brad Gushue	Saville SC, Edmonton, Alberta
Glenn Howard	Wayne Middaugh	Brent Laing	Craig Savill	Scott Howard	Coldwater & District CC, Coldwater, Ontario
Jeff Stoughton	Jon Mead	Reid Carruthers	Mark Nichols	Garth Smith	Charleswood CC, Winnipeg, Manitoba
Kevin Koe	Pat Simmons	Carter Rycroft	Nolan Thiessen	Jamie King	Glencoe CC, Calgary, Alberta
Mike McEwen	B. J. Neufeld	Matt Wozniak	Denni Neufeld	Brendan Melnyk	Fort Rouge CC, Winnipeg, Manitoba
John Epping	Scott Bailey	Collin Mitchell	David Mathers	Trevor Wall	Donalda CC, Toronto, Ontario
Jim Cotter (fourth)	John Morris (skip)	Tyrel Griffith	Rick Sawatsky	Jason Gunnlaugson	Kelowna CC, Kelowna, British Columbia; Vernon CC, Vernon, British Columbia
Brad Jacobs	Ryan Fry	E. J. Harnden	Ryan Harnden	Caleb Flaxey	Soo CA, Sault Ste. Marie, Ontario

=== Round-robin standings ===
Final round-robin standings

Key
Teams to Playoffs

Skip	W	L	PF	PA	Ends Won	Ends Lost	Blank Ends	Stolen Ends	Shot Pct.
(Ontario) Brad Jacobs	7	0	49	32	28	24	14	4	87%
(Alberta) Kevin Martin	6	1	46	36	29	22	18	4	89%
(British Columbia) John Morris	4	3	49	43	29	26	13	6	86%
(Manitoba) Mike McEwen	3	4	43	41	24	30	13	1	85%
(Manitoba) Jeff Stoughton	3	4	43	45	26	26	12	5	86%
(Alberta) Kevin Koe	2	5	39	50	26	28	12	3	85%
(Ontario) Glenn Howard	2	5	42	53	29	33	6	5	88%
(Ontario) John Epping	1	6	39	54	28	31	6	2	85%

=== Round-robin results ===
All draw times are listed in Central Standard Time (UTC−6).

==== Draw 2 ====
Sunday, December 1, 6:30 pm

Sheet A	1	2	3	4	5	6	7	8	9	10	Final
(Alberta) Kevin Martin 🔨	0	0	1	0	0	0	3	0	0	1	5
(Manitoba) Mike McEwen	0	0	0	0	1	0	0	2	0	0	3

Sheet B	1	2	3	4	5	6	7	8	9	10	Final
(Alberta) Kevin Koe 🔨	1	0	1	0	2	0	2	0	2	0	8
(Ontario) John Epping	0	1	0	3	0	2	0	2	0	1	9

Sheet C	1	2	3	4	5	6	7	8	9	10	Final
(Ontario) Glenn Howard 🔨	0	0	2	1	0	1	0	1	0	1	6
(British Columbia) John Morris	2	1	0	0	1	0	1	0	3	0	8

Sheet D	1	2	3	4	5	6	7	8	9	10	Final
(Ontario) Brad Jacobs 🔨	0	2	0	0	2	0	0	2	0	1	7
(Manitoba) Jeff Stoughton	0	0	0	1	0	2	0	0	1	0	4

==== Draw 4 ====
Monday, December 2, 1:30 pm

Sheet A	1	2	3	4	5	6	7	8	9	10	Final
(Ontario) John Epping	0	1	0	1	0	2	0	1	0	X	5
(Ontario) Glenn Howard 🔨	3	0	2	0	2	0	1	0	1	X	9

Sheet B	1	2	3	4	5	6	7	8	9	10	Final
(Manitoba) Mike McEwen	0	0	2	0	1	0	0	0	2	0	5
(Ontario) Brad Jacobs 🔨	0	1	0	1	0	2	2	0	0	1	7

Sheet C	1	2	3	4	5	6	7	8	9	10	Final
(Manitoba) Jeff Stoughton	0	0	0	1	0	1	0	0	3	0	5
(Alberta) Kevin Martin 🔨	0	0	2	0	1	0	0	2	0	1	6

Sheet D	1	2	3	4	5	6	7	8	9	10	Final
(British Columbia) John Morris	0	0	0	0	2	0	2	0	1	1	6
(Alberta) Kevin Koe 🔨	0	2	0	0	0	2	0	0	0	0	4

==== Draw 6 ====
Tuesday, December 3, 8:30 am

Sheet A	1	2	3	4	5	6	7	8	9	10	Final
(Manitoba) Jeff Stoughton 🔨	0	2	0	0	0	0	1	0	0	1	4
(Ontario) John Epping	0	0	0	0	1	0	0	1	1	0	3

Sheet B	1	2	3	4	5	6	7	8	9	10	Final
(Alberta) Kevin Martin	0	0	0	1	0	0	1	2	0	2	6
(Alberta) Kevin Koe 🔨	0	0	2	0	2	0	0	0	1	0	5

Sheet C	1	2	3	4	5	6	7	8	9	10	Final
(Ontario) Brad Jacobs 🔨	0	1	0	3	0	0	1	1	0	0	6
(Ontario) Glenn Howard	0	0	1	0	2	0	0	0	1	1	5

Sheet D	1	2	3	4	5	6	7	8	9	10	Final
(Manitoba) Mike McEwen	0	0	2	0	2	0	0	3	0	X	7
(British Columbia) John Morris 🔨	0	2	0	2	0	0	1	0	0	X	5

==== Draw 8 ====
Tuesday, December 3, 6:30 pm

Sheet A	1	2	3	4	5	6	7	8	9	10	Final
(Alberta) Kevin Koe 🔨	2	0	0	1	0	1	0	0	X	X	4
(Ontario) Brad Jacobs	0	2	0	0	2	0	1	4	X	X	9

Sheet B	1	2	3	4	5	6	7	8	9	10	Final
(British Columbia) John Morris	1	0	0	3	0	2	0	1	4	X	11
(Manitoba) Jeff Stoughton 🔨	0	2	0	0	1	0	2	0	0	X	5

Sheet C	1	2	3	4	5	6	7	8	9	10	Final
(Ontario) John Epping	0	2	0	2	0	1	0	2	0	X	7
(Manitoba) Mike McEwen 🔨	1	0	2	0	2	0	2	0	3	X	10

Sheet D	1	2	3	4	5	6	7	8	9	10	Final
(Ontario) Glenn Howard	0	2	0	2	0	2	0	1	0	0	7
(Alberta) Kevin Martin 🔨	1	0	1	0	1	0	1	0	4	1	9

==== Draw 10 ====
Wednesday, December 4, 1:30 pm

Sheet A	1	2	3	4	5	6	7	8	9	10	Final
(Ontario) Brad Jacobs	0	1	0	4	0	1	0	0	2	X	8
(British Columbia) John Morris 🔨	0	0	1	0	1	0	2	2	0	X	6

Sheet B	1	2	3	4	5	6	7	8	9	10	Final
(Ontario) Glenn Howard 🔨	2	0	0	1	0	1	0	1	0	1	6
(Manitoba) Mike McEwen	0	0	2	0	1	0	1	0	1	0	5

Sheet C	1	2	3	4	5	6	7	8	9	10	Final
(Alberta) Kevin Koe	0	1	0	2	0	1	0	2	X	X	6
(Manitoba) Jeff Stoughton 🔨	2	0	3	0	1	0	4	0	X	X	10

Sheet D	1	2	3	4	5	6	7	8	9	10	Final
(Alberta) Kevin Martin	0	2	0	4	0	2	0	0	1	X	9
(Ontario) John Epping 🔨	1	0	1	0	2	0	0	1	0	X	5

==== Draw 13 ====
Thursday, December 5, 6:30 pm

Sheet A	1	2	3	4	5	6	7	8	9	10	Final
(Ontario) Glenn Howard	0	0	0	2	0	0	2	1	1	0	6
(Alberta) Kevin Koe 🔨	0	3	1	0	2	0	0	0	0	1	7

Sheet B	1	2	3	4	5	6	7	8	9	10	Final
(Ontario) John Epping	0	1	0	1	0	2	1	0	1	0	6
(British Columbia) John Morris 🔨	2	0	2	0	1	0	0	1	0	1	7

Sheet C	1	2	3	4	5	6	7	8	9	10	Final
(Alberta) Kevin Martin 🔨	1	0	1	1	0	0	1	0	0	0	4
(Ontario) Brad Jacobs	0	1	0	0	0	2	0	0	0	2	5

Sheet D	1	2	3	4	5	6	7	8	9	10	Final
(Manitoba) Jeff Stoughton	0	1	0	1	2	0	1	0	1	X	6
(Manitoba) Mike McEwen 🔨	1	0	4	0	0	1	0	3	0	X	9

==== Draw 14 ====
Friday, December 6, 8:30 am

Sheet A	1	2	3	4	5	6	7	8	9	10	11	Final
(British Columbia) John Morris 🔨	0	0	2	0	2	0	0	0	0	2	0	6
(Alberta) Kevin Martin	0	0	0	2	0	3	0	1	0	0	1	7

Sheet B	1	2	3	4	5	6	7	8	9	10	Final
(Manitoba) Jeff Stoughton	0	0	2	3	1	0	2	1	X	X	9
(Ontario) Glenn Howard 🔨	2	1	0	0	0	0	0	0	X	X	3

Sheet C	1	2	3	4	5	6	7	8	9	10	Final
(Manitoba) Mike McEwen	1	0	0	0	0	0	1	0	2	0	4
(Alberta) Kevin Koe 🔨	0	1	1	1	0	0	0	1	0	1	5

Sheet D	1	2	3	4	5	6	7	8	9	10	Final
(Ontario) John Epping	0	0	1	0	2	0	0	1	0	X	4
(Ontario) Brad Jacobs 🔨	0	2	0	1	0	0	3	0	1	X	7

=== Playoffs ===
Semifinal			Final
			1	(Ontario) Brad Jacobs	7
2	(Alberta) Kevin Martin	5	3	(British Columbia) John Morris	4
3	(British Columbia) John Morris	7

==== Semifinal ====
Saturday, December 7, 1:30 pm

Sheet C	1	2	3	4	5	6	7	8	9	10	Final
(Alberta) Kevin Martin 🔨	0	2	0	0	1	0	1	0	1	0	5
(British Columbia) John Morris	0	0	1	0	0	2	0	2	0	2	7

Player percentages
(Alberta) Team Martin		(British Columbia) Team Morris	
Ben Hebert	86%	Rick Sawatsky	86%
Marc Kennedy	94%	Tyrel Griffith	80%
David Nedohin	81%	John Morris	86%
Kevin Martin	76%	Jim Cotter	88%
Total	84%	Total	85%

==== Final ====
Sunday, December 8, 2:00 pm

Team	1	2	3	4	5	6	7	8	9	10	Final
(Ontario) Brad Jacobs	2	0	1	0	0	2	0	0	2	X	7
(British Columbia) John Morris	0	1	0	0	2	0	0	1	0	X	4

Player percentages
(Ontario) Team Jacobs		(British Columbia) Team Morris	
Ryan Harnden	92%	Rick Sawatsky	93%
E. J. Harnden	91%	Tyrel Griffith	76%
Ryan Fry	93%	John Morris	69%
Brad Jacobs	93%	Jim Cotter	87%
Total	92%	Total	81%

== Women ==
=== Teams ===
The teams are listed as follows:

Skip	Third	Second	Lead	Alternate	Locale
Jennifer Jones	Kaitlyn Lawes	Jill Officer	Dawn McEwen	Kirsten Wall	St. Vital CC, Winnipeg, Manitoba
Heather Nedohin	Beth Iskiw	Jessica Mair	Laine Peters	Amy Nixon	Saville SC, Edmonton, Alberta
Stefanie Lawton	Sherry Anderson	Sherri Singler	Marliese Kasner	Cori Morris	Granite CC, Saskatoon, Saskatchewan
Rachel Homan	Emma Miskew	Alison Kreviazuk	Lisa Weagle	Heather Smith	Ottawa CC, Ottawa, Ontario
Sherry Middaugh	Jo-Ann Rizzo	Lee Merklinger	Leigh Armstrong	Lori Eddy	Coldwater & District CC, Coldwater, Ontario
Chelsea Carey	Kristy McDonald	Kristen Foster	Lindsay Titheridge	Breanne Meakin	Fort Rouge CC, Winnipeg, Manitoba
Renée Sonnenberg	Lawnie MacDonald	Cary-Anne McTaggart	Rona Pasika	Desirée Owen	Grande Prairie CC, Grande Prairie, Alberta
Val Sweeting	Joanne Courtney	Dana Ferguson	Rachelle Pidherny	Amber Holland	Saville SC, Edmonton, Alberta

=== Round-robin standings ===
Final round robin Standings

Key
Teams to Playoffs
Teams to Tiebreaker

Skip	W	L	PF	PA	Ends Won	Ends Lost	Blank Ends	Stolen Ends	Shot Pct.
(Manitoba) Jennifer Jones	6	1	53	34	31	23	11	10	87%
(Ontario) Rachel Homan	4	3	42	45	29	28	12	7	84%
(Ontario) Sherry Middaugh	4	3	41	42	30	27	15	5	84%
(Manitoba) Chelsea Carey	4	3	42	41	27	28	13	4	81%
(Alberta) Heather Nedohin	3	4	37	39	27	28	15	5	83%
(Alberta) Val Sweeting	3	4	50	43	32	30	7	10	79%
(Saskatchewan) Stefanie Lawton	2	5	36	44	25	28	16	5	83%
(Alberta) Renée Sonnenberg	2	5	37	44	25	33	9	4	79%

Note: At the conclusion of the round robin, Carey, Homan, and Middaugh were all tied at second place. The tie between the three teams was broken by the draw shot challenge. Homan had the best result in the challenge, and was thus awarded the second seed and a spot in the semifinal, while Carey and Middaugh will play a tiebreaker to determine the third seed.

=== Round-robin results ===
All draw times are listed in Central Standard Time (UTC−6).

==== Draw 1 ====
Sunday, December 1, 1:00 pm

Sheet A	1	2	3	4	5	6	7	8	9	10	Final
(Ontario) Sherry Middaugh	1	0	0	0	0	2	0	1	0	1	5
(Saskatchewan) Stefanie Lawton 🔨	0	0	0	0	1	0	0	0	2	0	3

Sheet B	1	2	3	4	5	6	7	8	9	10	Final
(Ontario) Rachel Homan 🔨	0	0	0	1	0	2	0	0	0	X	3
(Alberta) Val Sweeting	0	1	1	0	2	0	2	2	2	X	10

Sheet C	1	2	3	4	5	6	7	8	9	10	Final
(Manitoba) Jennifer Jones	0	1	2	0	0	6	0	1	X	X	10
(Manitoba) Chelsea Carey 🔨	0	0	0	1	0	0	1	0	X	X	2

Sheet D	1	2	3	4	5	6	7	8	9	10	Final
(Alberta) Renée Sonnenberg	0	1	3	1	0	0	2	0	0	1	8
(Alberta) Heather Nedohin 🔨	2	0	0	0	0	2	0	1	1	0	6

==== Draw 3 ====
Monday, December 2, 8:30 am

Sheet A	1	2	3	4	5	6	7	8	9	10	Final
(Ontario) Rachel Homan 🔨	0	0	1	3	0	0	0	4	X	X	8
(Alberta) Renée Sonnenberg	0	0	0	0	0	1	1	0	X	X	2

Sheet B	1	2	3	4	5	6	7	8	9	10	11	Final
(Manitoba) Chelsea Carey 🔨	1	0	0	1	0	0	0	1	0	2	3	8
(Alberta) Heather Nedohin	0	1	1	0	1	1	0	0	1	0	0	5

Sheet C	1	2	3	4	5	6	7	8	9	10	Final
(Alberta) Val Sweeting 🔨	2	0	2	1	0	0	2	0	0	1	8
(Saskatchewan) Stefanie Lawton	0	1	0	0	1	1	0	2	1	0	6

Sheet D	1	2	3	4	5	6	7	8	9	10	11	Final
(Manitoba) Jennifer Jones	0	0	0	3	0	1	0	1	0	2	2	9
(Ontario) Sherry Middaugh 🔨	0	0	1	0	2	0	3	0	1	0	0	7

==== Draw 5 ====
Monday, December 2, 6:30 pm

Sheet A	1	2	3	4	5	6	7	8	9	10	Final
(Alberta) Val Sweeting	0	0	1	2	0	1	4	1	0	X	9
(Manitoba) Jennifer Jones 🔨	2	1	0	0	1	0	0	0	2	X	6

Sheet B	1	2	3	4	5	6	7	8	9	10	Final
(Saskatchewan) Stefanie Lawton	0	0	1	2	0	1	0	2	1	1	8
(Alberta) Renée Sonnenberg 🔨	2	1	0	0	2	0	1	0	0	0	6

Sheet C	1	2	3	4	5	6	7	8	9	10	Final
(Alberta) Heather Nedohin 🔨	0	2	0	1	0	1	0	2	0	X	6
(Ontario) Sherry Middaugh	0	0	1	0	1	0	1	0	0	X	3

Sheet D	1	2	3	4	5	6	7	8	9	10	Final
(Manitoba) Chelsea Carey	0	0	2	0	2	1	0	2	2	0	9
(Ontario) Rachel Homan 🔨	1	1	0	3	0	0	2	0	0	1	8

==== Draw 7 ====
Tuesday, December 3, 1:30 pm

Sheet A	1	2	3	4	5	6	7	8	9	10	Final
(Alberta) Heather Nedohin 🔨	0	1	0	1	0	0	3	0	0	1	6
(Alberta) Val Sweeting	0	0	1	0	0	1	0	2	1	0	5

Sheet B	1	2	3	4	5	6	7	8	9	10	11	Final
(Ontario) Sherry Middaugh	0	0	1	0	0	1	0	1	0	2	0	5
(Ontario) Rachel Homan 🔨	2	0	0	0	1	0	1	0	1	0	1	6

Sheet C	1	2	3	4	5	6	7	8	9	10	Final
(Alberta) Renée Sonnenberg 🔨	0	0	0	0	1	0	0	1	X	X	2
(Manitoba) Jennifer Jones	2	1	1	0	0	2	1	0	X	X	7

Sheet D	1	2	3	4	5	6	7	8	9	10	Final
(Saskatchewan) Stefanie Lawton	0	0	2	0	0	0	0	4	0	1	7
(Manitoba) Chelsea Carey 🔨	0	2	0	0	0	0	1	0	2	0	5

==== Draw 9 ====
Wednesday, December 4, 8:30 am

Sheet A	1	2	3	4	5	6	7	8	9	10	Final
(Alberta) Renée Sonnenberg	0	0	2	0	1	0	1	0	0	0	4
(Manitoba) Chelsea Carey 🔨	0	2	0	1	0	1	0	1	0	1	6

Sheet B	1	2	3	4	5	6	7	8	9	10	Final
(Manitoba) Jennifer Jones 🔨	1	0	0	2	0	0	3	0	2	X	8
(Saskatchewan) Stefanie Lawton	0	0	1	0	1	0	0	1	0	X	3

Sheet C	1	2	3	4	5	6	7	8	9	10	Final
(Ontario) Rachel Homan 🔨	0	0	0	1	0	2	0	1	0	1	5
(Alberta) Heather Nedohin	0	0	0	0	1	0	1	0	1	0	3

Sheet D	1	2	3	4	5	6	7	8	9	10	Final
(Ontario) Sherry Middaugh	0	0	2	0	0	1	0	1	0	3	7
(Alberta) Val Sweeting 🔨	0	1	0	0	3	0	1	0	1	0	6

==== Draw 11 ====
Wednesday, December 4, 6:30 pm

Sheet A	1	2	3	4	5	6	7	8	9	10	Final
(Manitoba) Jennifer Jones 🔨	0	1	0	2	0	0	2	0	1	1	7
(Ontario) Rachel Homan	0	0	1	0	3	1	0	1	0	0	6

Sheet B	1	2	3	4	5	6	7	8	9	10	Final
(Alberta) Val Sweeting 🔨	0	1	0	1	0	0	0	2	0	0	4
(Manitoba) Chelsea Carey	1	0	1	0	1	1	0	0	1	1	6

Sheet C	1	2	3	4	5	6	7	8	9	10	11	Final
(Ontario) Sherry Middaugh 🔨	1	0	2	0	0	1	1	0	1	0	1	7
(Alberta) Renée Sonnenberg	0	1	0	2	0	0	0	1	0	2	0	6

Sheet D	1	2	3	4	5	6	7	8	9	10	Final
(Alberta) Heather Nedohin 🔨	0	0	1	0	2	0	0	2	0	1	6
(Saskatchewan) Stefanie Lawton	0	2	0	1	0	0	1	0	0	0	4

==== Draw 12 ====
Thursday, December 5, 1:30 pm

Sheet A	1	2	3	4	5	6	7	8	9	10	Final
(Manitoba) Chelsea Carey 🔨	0	2	0	1	0	0	0	3	0	0	6
(Ontario) Sherry Middaugh	0	0	2	0	2	1	1	0	0	1	7

Sheet B	1	2	3	4	5	6	7	8	9	10	Final
(Alberta) Heather Nedohin	0	0	0	0	2	0	0	1	2	0	5
(Manitoba) Jennifer Jones 🔨	0	0	0	3	0	1	1	0	0	1	6

Sheet C	1	2	3	4	5	6	7	8	9	10	Final
(Saskatchewan) Stefanie Lawton 🔨	0	2	0	0	0	1	0	0	2	0	5
(Ontario) Rachel Homan	0	0	1	3	0	0	0	1	0	1	6

Sheet D	1	2	3	4	5	6	7	8	9	10	11	Final
(Alberta) Val Sweeting	0	1	2	0	3	0	0	1	0	1	0	8
(Alberta) Renée Sonnenberg 🔨	2	0	0	2	0	0	2	0	2	0	1	9

=== Tiebreaker ===
Friday, December 6, 1:30 pm

Sheet D	1	2	3	4	5	6	7	8	9	10	Final
(Ontario) Sherry Middaugh 🔨	1	0	0	0	1	0	0	2	0	2	6
(Manitoba) Chelsea Carey	0	0	0	1	0	1	0	0	1	0	3

Player percentages
(Ontario) Team Middaugh		(Manitoba) Team Carey	
Leigh Armstrong	80%	Lindsay Titheridge	93%
Lee Merklinger	85%	Kristen Foster	76%
Jo-Ann Rizzo	88%	Kristy McDonald	80%
Sherry Middaugh	91%	Chelsea Carey	94%
Total	86%	Total	86%

=== Playoffs ===
Semifinal			Final
			1	(Manitoba) Jennifer Jones	8
2	(Ontario) Rachel Homan	4	3	(Ontario) Sherry Middaugh	4
3	(Ontario) Sherry Middaugh	10

==== Semifinal ====
Friday, December 6, 6:30 pm

Sheet C	1	2	3	4	5	6	7	8	9	10	Final
(Ontario) Rachel Homan	0	1	0	2	0	0	1	0	X	X	4
(Ontario) Sherry Middaugh 🔨	1	0	3	0	2	3	0	1	X	X	10

Player percentages
(Ontario) Team Homan		(Ontario) Team Middaugh	
Lisa Weagle	88%	Leigh Armstrong	82%
Alison Kreviazuk	72%	Lee Merklinger	81%
Emma Miskew	61%	Jo-Ann Rizzo	91%
Rachel Homan	70%	Sherry Middaugh	81%
Total	73%	Total	84%

==== Final ====
Saturday, December 7, 6:30 pm

Sheet C	1	2	3	4	5	6	7	8	9	10	Final
(Manitoba) Jennifer Jones 🔨	0	3	0	0	1	0	3	0	1	X	8
(Ontario) Sherry Middaugh	0	0	1	0	0	2	0	1	0	X	4

Player percentages
(Manitoba) Team Jones		(Ontario) Team Middaugh	
Dawn McEwen	88%	Leigh Armstrong	94%
Jill Officer	99%	Lee Merklinger	81%
Kaitlyn Lawes	90%	Jo-Ann Rizzo	78%
Jennifer Jones	91%	Sherry Middaugh	78%
Total	92%	Total	83%

== Statistics ==
Round robin only

=== Women ===
==== Top 5 player percentages ====
Leads	%
(Manitoba) Dawn McEwen	92
(Saskatchewan) Marliese Kasner	91
(Ontario) Lisa Weagle	89
(Manitoba) Lindsay Titheridge	88
(Alberta) Laine Peters	86

Seconds	%
(Ontario) Alison Kreviazuk	87
(Ontario) Lee Merklinger	87
(Alberta) Jessica Mair	85
(Manitoba) Jill Officer	84
(Saskatchewan) Sherri Singler	83

Thirds	%
(Manitoba) Kaitlyn Lawes	84
(Ontario) Emma Miskew	83
(Ontario) Jo-Ann Rizzo	82
(Saskatchewan) Sherry Anderson	81
(Alberta) Lawnie McDonald	80

Skips	%
(Manitoba) Jennifer Jones	84
(Ontario) Sherry Middaugh	84
(Alberta) Heather Nedohin	82
(Alberta) Val Sweeting	81
(Ontario) Rachel Homan	79

==== Team percentages ====
Skip	%
(Manitoba) Jennifer Jones	86
(Ontario) Rachel Homan	85
(Ontario) Sherry Middaugh	84
(Alberta) Heather Nedohin	83
(Saskatchewan) Stefanie Lawton	83
(Manitoba) Chelsea Carey	81
(Alberta) Val Sweeting	79
(Alberta) Renée Sonnenberg	79

==== Perfect games ====
Player	Team	Position	Shots	Opponent
Lisa Weagle	(Ontario) Homan	Lead	18	(Alberta) Sweeting
Dawn McEwen	(Manitoba) Jones	Lead	14	(Manitoba) Carey
Alison Kreviazuk	(Ontario) Homan	Second	22	(Ontario) Middaugh
Leigh Armstrong	(Ontario) Middaugh	Lead	22	(Ontario) Homan
Marliese Kasner	(Saskatchewan) Lawton	Lead	20	(Ontario) Homan

=== Men ===
==== Top 5 player percentages ====
Leads	%
(Ontario) Craig Savill	95
(Alberta) Ben Hebert	93
(Manitoba) Mark Nichols	92
(Ontario) David Mathers	92
(Alberta) Nolan Thiessen	89

Seconds	%
(Alberta) Marc Kennedy	91
(Ontario) Brent Laing	87
(Ontario) E. J. Harnden	86
(Alberta) Carter Rycroft	86
(Manitoba) Reid Carruthers	85

Thirds	%
(Manitoba) Jon Mead	88
(British Columbia) John Morris	88
(Ontario) Wayne Middaugh	87
(Manitoba) B. J. Neufeld	86
(Alberta) Pat Simmons	85

Skips	%
(Alberta) Kevin Martin	92
(Ontario) Brad Jacobs	89
(Manitoba) Mike McEwen	86
(British Columbia) Jim Cotter	85
(Ontario) Glenn Howard	83

==== Team percentages ====
Skip	%
(Alberta) Kevin Martin	89
(Ontario) Glenn Howard	88
(Ontario) Brad Jacobs	87
(British Columbia) John Morris	86
(Manitoba) Jeff Stoughton	86
(Manitoba) Mike McEwen	85
(Alberta) Kevin Koe	85
(Ontario) John Epping	85

==== Perfect games ====
Player	Team	Position	Shots	Opponent
Jon Mead	(Manitoba) Stoughton	Third	20	(Ontario) Epping
