= Kristy McDonald =

Canadian curler

- Curler
- Born: Kristy Jenion; May 20, 1979 (age 47); Winnipeg, Manitoba

Team
- Curling club: Granite CC, Winnipeg, MB
- Skip: Kristy McDonald
- Third: Lisa Blixhavn
- Second: Leslie Wilson-Westcott
- Lead: Raunora Westcott
- Alternate: Lindsay Warkentin

Curling career
- Member Association: Manitoba
- Hearts: 2 (2009, 2014)
- Top CTRS ranking: 5th (2010–11, 2012–13, 2013–14)
- Grand Slam victories: 1 (2010 Manitoba Lotteries Women's Curling Classic)
Medal record
Women's curling
Representing Manitoba
Scotties Tournament of Hearts
Bronze medal – third place	2014 Montreal

Kristy McDonald (born May 20, 1979 as Kristy Jenion) is a Canadian from Winnipeg, Manitoba. McDonald retired from 2016–2021, but returned to the playing for the 2021–22 season.

== Career ==
=== Juniors ===
McDonald had a strong junior career, skipping teams to win both the 1996 and 1999 Manitoba Junior Curling Championships. She would represent Manitoba in both of those years at the Canadian Junior Curling Championships. At the 1996 Canadian Juniors, her team which included Ainsley Holowec, Shea Westcott and Raunora Westcott finished with a 5–7 record at the Canadian Juniors. At the 1999 Canadian Juniors, her team was made up of Reagan Wilkie, Charmaine Forese and Kyla Denisuik. McDonald led her team to a 7–5 record at the 1999 Juniors, which was not good enough to make the playoffs.

=== 2004–2010 ===
After juniors, McDonald graduated to a women's curling career. She won her first World Curling Tour event as a skip at the 2004 East St. Paul Cash Spiel. She lost back-to-back Manitoba Scotties Tournament of Hearts as a skip in 2005 and 2006. She would be a semi-finalist at the 2007, 2008 and 2009 tournaments as well. McDonald was asked to be the alternate for Team Manitoba (skipped by Barb Spencer) at the 2009 Scotties Tournament of Hearts.

=== 2010–2014 ===
In 2010, McDonald joined the Chelsea Carey rink at third. The team would find immediate success in the 2010–11 season, winning the 2010 Manitoba Lotteries Women's Curling Classic, McDonald's first (and to date, only) Grand Slam championship. The team made it to the finals of the 2011 Manitoba Scotties Tournament of Hearts that year, but lost to Cathy Overton-Clapham. The following season, they lost in the finals again, losing to Jennifer Jones at the 2012 Manitoba Scotties Tournament of Hearts. As a member of the Carey rink, McDonald won the 2011 DEKALB Superspiel, the 2012 Victoria Curling Classic Invitational and the 2012 Red Deer Curling Classic. The team also lost in the finals of the 2011 Canada Cup of Curling.

The team qualified for the 2013 Canadian Olympic Curling Trials, where they finished fourth, after losing to Sherry Middaugh in a tie-breaker match. After losing in four Manitoba finals in her career, McDonald finally won her first provincial title at the 2014 Manitoba Scotties Tournament of Hearts later in the season. At the Scotties, the team finished the round robin with a 9–2 round robin record, qualifying for the 1 vs. 2 game against Team Canada, skipped by Rachel Homan. The team lost the 1 vs. 2 game and the semifinal before rebounding in the bronze medal game, defeating Saskatchewan's Stefanie Lawton to take home the bronze medal. In the weeks following the Scotties, the Carey team announced they would disband, effective immediately. McDonald announced she would return to skipping a team, backed by Kate Cameron at third, Leslie Wilson at second and Raunora Westcott at lead.

=== 2014–2016 ===
In her first World Curling Tour event with her new team, McDonald won the 2014 Mother Club Fall Curling Classic. She would play in four Grand Slam events in her first season as skip, making it to the quarterfinals at the 2014 Colonial Square Ladies Classic. The team made it to the playoffs at the 2015 Manitoba Scotties Tournament of Hearts, losing in the 3 vs. 4 game to the Barb Spencer rink. The next season, her rink found more success in the Slams, making it to the playoffs in three of the four events they played in, including making it to the semifinals of the 2015 Masters. The McDonald rink also played in the 2015 Canada Cup of Curling, where they would finish with a 1-5 record. The team would find more success at the 2016 Manitoba Scotties Tournament of Hearts, making it all the way to the finals before losing to Kerri Einarson. On February 21, 2016, McDonald announced she would be retiring from curling, with Michelle Englot taking over her team as skip.

=== 2021–present ===
On April 25, 2021, it was announced that McDonald would return to curling after her five year retirement, skipping her own team consisting of Lisa Blixhavn, Leslie Wilson-Westcott, Raunora Westcott and Lindsay Warkentin.

== Personal life ==
Outside of curling, McDonald works as a letter carrier for Canada Post. She attended Westwood Collegiate for high school and both the University of Manitoba and the University of Winnipeg. She is the daughter of 2003 Manitoba champion third Bob Jenion.

== Grand Slam record ==
Key
C	Champion
F	Lost in Final
SF	Lost in Semifinal
QF	Lost in Quarterfinals
R16	Lost in the round of 16
Q	Did not advance to playoffs
T2	Played in Tier 2 event
DNP	Did not participate in event
N/A	Not a Grand Slam event that season

Event	2006–07	2007–08	2008–09	2009–10	2010–11	2011–12	2012–13	2013–14	2014–15	2015–16
Tour Challenge	N/A	N/A	N/A	N/A	N/A	N/A	N/A	N/A	N/A	QF
Masters	N/A	N/A	N/A	N/A	N/A	N/A	F	Q	Q	SF
The National	N/A	N/A	N/A	N/A	N/A	N/A	N/A	N/A	N/A	QF
Canadian Open	N/A	N/A	N/A	N/A	N/A	N/A	N/A	N/A	Q	Q
Players'	DNP	DNP	DNP	Q	QF	Q	Q	DNP	Q	Q

=== Former events ===
Event	2006–07	2007–08	2008–09	2009–10	2010–11	2011–12	2012–13	2013–14	2014–15
Autumn Gold	Q	DNP	Q	DNP	Q	Q	Q	Q	DNP
Colonial Square	N/A	N/A	N/A	N/A	N/A	N/A	F	Q	QF
Manitoba Liquor & Lotteries	Q	Q	Q	Q	C	Q	Q	Q	N/A
Sobeys Slam	DNP	DNP	N/A	F	N/A	N/A	N/A	N/A	N/A
