= Wayden Transportation Ladies Classic =

Former World Curling Tour event

The Wayden Transportation Ladies Classic, also known as the Abbotsford Ladies, was a Grand Slam event on the Women's World Curling Tour. It was held annually in November in Abbotsford, British Columbia. It was discontinued after the 2008-09 curling season.

== Champions 2005-2008 ==
| Year | Winning team | Runner-up team | Purse |
|---|---|---|---|
| 2008 | Jennifer Jones, Cathy Overton-Clapham, Jill Officer, Dawn Askin | Stefanie Lawton, Marliese Kasner, Sherri Singler, Lana Vey | $60,000 |
| 2007 | Kelly Scott, Jeanna Schraeder, Sasha Carter, Renee Simons, Michelle Allen | Stefanie Lawton, Marliese Kasner, Sherri Singler, Lana Vey | $60,000 |
| 2006 | Stefanie Lawton, Marliese Kasner, Sherri Singler, Chelsey Bell | Renelle Bryden, Nancy Smith, Jody McNabb, Shannon Mattheis | $60,000 |
| 2005 | Janet Harvey, Jill Thurston, Cherie-Ann Loder, Carey Burgess | Heather Rankin, Deanna Doig, Samantha Preston, Terri Clark | $47,000 |

== Champions 2000-2004 ==
| Year | Winning team |
|---|---|
| 2004 | Kelley Law, Jody Maskiewich, Marla Mallett, Sherry Fraser |
| 2003 | Kelly Scott, Jeanna Schraeder, Sasha Bergner, Renee Simons |
| 2002 | Kelly Scott, Jeanna Schraeder, Sasha Bergner, Renee Simons |
| 2001 | Shannon Kleibrink, Judy Pendergast, Deb Pendergast, Cheryl Meek |
| 2000 | Shannon Kleibrink, Judy Pendergast, Deb Pendergast, Cheryl Meek |

== 2006 Wayden Transportation Ladies Classic ==
Playoffs

Quarterfinals
(Alberta) Renelle Bryden | 6
(British Columbia) Kelly Scott | 4
(Alberta) Cheryl Bernard | 6
(British Columbia) Marla Mallett | 8
(Saskatchewan) Stefanie Lawton | 7
(Saskatchewan) Sherry Anderson | 4
(Alberta) Shannon Kleibrink | 11
(Manitoba) Jennifer Jones | 8

Semifinals
(Alberta) Renelle Bryden | 8
(British Columbia) Marla Mallett | 5
(Saskatchewan) Stefanie Lawton | 7
(Alberta) Shannon Kleibrink | 4

Finals
(Alberta) Renelle Bryden | 2
(Saskatchewan) Stefanie Lawton | 8

== 2007 Wayden Transportation Ladies Classic ==
Playoffs

Quarterfinals
(Ontario) Julie Reddick | 3
(British Columbia) Kelly Scott | 5
(Saskatchewan) Michelle Englot | 0
(Alberta) Kristie Moore | 7
(Alberta) Shannon Kleibrink | 2
(Saskatchewan) Sherry Anderson | 9
(Saskatchewan) Stefanie Lawton | 7
(Alberta) Cathy King | 5

Semifinals
(British Columbia) Kelly Scott | 7
(Alberta) Kristie Moore | 3
(Saskatchewan) Sherry Anderson | 4
(Saskatchewan) Stefanie Lawton | 5

Finals
(British Columbia) Kelly Scott | 5
(Saskatchewan) Stefanie Lawton | 4

== 2008 Wayden Transportation Ladies Classic ==
Playoffs

Quarterfinals
(Ontario) Rachel Homan | 6
(Alberta) Crystal Webster | 4
(Manitoba) Jennifer Jones | 5
(British Columbia) Georgina Wheatcroft | 2
(Alberta) Shannon Kleibrink | 7
(Saskatchewan) Michelle Englot | 6
(Saskatchewan) Stefanie Lawton | 7
(Alberta) Cathy King | 5

Semifinals
(Ontario) Rachel Homan | 2
(Manitoba) Jennifer Jones | 6
(Alberta) Cheryl Bernard | 5
(Saskatchewan) Stefanie Lawton | 6

Finals
(Manitoba) Jennifer Jones | 9
(Saskatchewan) Stefanie Lawton | 2
