= 2012 Manitoba Lotteries Women's Curling Classic =

- Host city: Winnipeg, Manitoba
- Arena: Fort Rouge Curling Club
- Dates: October 19–22
- Winner: (Saskatchewan) Stefanie Lawton
- Curling club: Nutana CC, Saskatoon
- Skip: Stefanie Lawton
- Third: Sherry Anderson
- Second: Sherri Singler
- Lead: Marliese Kasner
- Finalist: (Ontario) Rachel Homan

The 2012 Manitoba Lotteries Women's Curling Classic was held October 19 to 22 at the Fort Rouge Curling Club in Winnipeg, Manitoba. It was the second women's Grand Slam event of the 2012–13 curling season, and this edition of the event marked the ninth time that the tournament has been held. The purse for the event was CAD$60,000, of which the winner, Stefanie Lawton, received CAD$15,000. Lawton defeated Rachel Homan in the final with a score of 6–4.

== Teams ==
The teams are listed as follows:

Skip	Third	Second	Lead	Locale
Cathy Auld	Janet Murphy	Stephanie Gray	Melissa Foster	Mississauga, Ontario
Cheryl Bernard	Susan O'Connor	Lori Olson-Johns	Jennifer Sadleir	Calgary, Alberta
Joelle Brown	Susan Baleja	Kelsey Boettcher	Jennifer Cawson	Winnipeg, Manitoba
Chelsea Carey	Kristy Jenion	Kristen Foster	Lindsay Titheridge	Morden, Manitoba
Laura Crocker	Sarah Wilkes	Rebecca Pattison	Jen Gates	Edmonton, Alberta
Lisa DeRiviere	Karen Klein	Jolene Rutter	Theresa Cannon	Winnipeg, Manitoba
Karen Fallis	Sam Murata	Jennifer Clark-Rouire	Jillian Sandison	Winnipeg, Manitoba
Janet Harvey	Cherie-Ann Loder	Kristin Loder	Carey Kirby	Winnipeg, Manitoba
Amber Holland	Jolene Campbell	Brooklyn Lemon	Dailene Sivertson	Regina, Saskatchewan
Rachel Homan	Emma Miskew	Alison Kreviazuk	Lisa Weagle	Ottawa, Ontario
Tracy Horgan	Jenn Horgan	Jenna Enge	Amanda Gates	Sudbury, Ontario
Jessie Kaufman	Nicky Kaufman	Kelly Erickson	Cori Morris	Edmonton, Alberta
Colleen Kilgallen	Janice Blair	Lesle Cafferty	Leslie Wilson	Pinawa, Manitoba
Shannon Kleibrink	Bronwen Webster	Kalynn Park	Chelsey Matson	Calgary, Alberta
Marie-France Larouche	Brenda Nicholls	Véronique Grégoire	Amélie Blais	Levis, Quebec
Kaitlyn Lawes	Kirsten Wall	Jill Officer	Dawn Askin	Winnipeg, Manitoba
Stefanie Lawton	Sherry Anderson	Sherri Singler	Marliese Kasner	Saskatoon, Saskatchewan
Kim Link	Maureen Bonar	Angela Wickman	Renee Fletcher	East St. Paul, Manitoba
Krista McCarville	Ashley Miharija	Kari Lavoie	Sarah Lang	Thunder Bay, Ontario
Sherry Middaugh	Jo-Ann Rizzo	Lee Merklinger	Leigh Armstrong	Coldwater, Ontario
Heather Nedohin	Beth Iskiw	Jessica Mair	Laine Peters	Edmonton, Alberta
Anette Norberg	Cecilia Östlund	Sabina Kraupp	Sara Carlsson	Harnosand, Sweden
Cathy Overton-Clapham	Jenna Loder	Ashley Howard	Breanne Meakin	Winnipeg, Manitoba
Darcy Robertson	Tracey Lavery	Venessa Foster	Michelle Kruk	Winnipeg, Manitoba
Kelly Scott	Jeanna Schraeder	Sasha Carter	Sarah Wazney	Kelowna, British Columbia
Maria Prytz	Christina Bertrup	Maria Wennerström	Margaretha Sigfridsson (skip)	Umea, Sweden
Heather Smith-Dacey	Stephanie McVicar	Blisse Comstock	Teri Lake	Halifax, Nova Scotia
Renée Sonnenberg	Lawnie MacDonald	Cary-Anne Sallows	Rona Pasika	Grande Prairie, Alberta
Barb Spencer	Katie Spencer	Ainsley Champagne	Raunora Westcott	Winnipeg, Manitoba
Valerie Sweeting	Dana Ferguson	Joanne Taylor	Rachelle Pidherny	Edmonton, Alberta
Jill Thurston	Kristen Phillips	Brette Richards	Kendra Georges	Winnipeg, Manitoba
Crystal Webster	Erin Carmody	Geri-Lynn Ramsay	Samantha Preston	Calgary, Alberta

== Knockout results ==
The draw is listed as follows:

=== A event ===
First Knockout
(Manitoba) Kaitlyn Lawes	8
(Manitoba) Karen Fallis	0
(Ontario) Tracy Horgan	3
(Saskatchewan) Amber Holland	4
(Nova Scotia) Heather Smith-Dacey	2
(Alberta) Cheryl Bernard	6
(Manitoba) Darcy Robertson	5
(Manitoba) Chelsea Carey	6
(Ontario) Sherry Middaugh	7
(Manitoba) Joelle Brown	2
(Alberta) Shannon Kleibrink	8
(Ontario) Cathy Auld	4
(Quebec) Marie-France Larouche	4
(British Columbia) Kelly Scott	2
(Saskatchewan) Stefanie Lawton	6
(Manitoba) Jill Thurston	5

Quarterfinals
(Manitoba) Kaitlyn Lawes	10
(Saskatchewan) Amber Holland	3
(Alberta) Cheryl Bernard	5
(Manitoba) Chelsea Carey	4
(Ontario) Sherry Middaugh	6
(Alberta) Shannon Kleibrink	5
(Quebec) Marie-France Larouche	6
(Saskatchewan) Stefanie Lawton	7

Semifinals
(Manitoba) Kaitlyn Lawes	8
(Alberta) Cheryl Bernard	3
(Ontario) Sherry Middaugh	2
(Saskatchewan) Stefanie Lawton	5

Qualifier 1
(Manitoba) Kaitlyn Lawes	8
(Saskatchewan) Stefanie Lawton	5

First Knockout
(Alberta) Heather Nedohin	7
(Manitoba) Kim Link	2
(Ontario) Rachel Homan	7
(Alberta) Jessie Kaufman	5
(Sweden) Margaretha Sigfridsson	6
(Manitoba) Lisa DeRiviere	3
(Alberta) Valerie Sweeting	5
(Manitoba) Barb Spencer	4
(Alberta) Renée Sonnenberg	5
(Manitoba) Janet Harvey	2
(Alberta) Crystal Webster	5
(Sweden) Anette Norberg	11
(Ontario) Krista McCarville	2
(Alberta) Laura Crocker	4
(Manitoba) Colleen Kilgallen	1
(Manitoba) Cathy Overton-Clapham	9

Quarterfinals
(Alberta) Heather Nedohin	5
(Ontario) Rachel Homan	7
(Sweden) Margaretha Sigfridsson	6
(Alberta) Valerie Sweeting	3
(Alberta) Renée Sonnenberg	6
(Sweden) Anette Norberg	3
(Alberta) Laura Crocker	6
(Manitoba) Cathy Overton-Clapham	5

Semifinals
(Ontario) Rachel Homan	4
(Sweden) Margaretha Sigfridsson	8
(Alberta) Renée Sonnenberg	6
(Alberta) Laura Crocker	8

Qualifier 2
(Sweden) Margaretha Sigfridsson	2
(Alberta) Laura Crocker	5

=== B event ===
Second Knockout
(Manitoba) Karen Fallis	4
(Ontario) Tracy Horgan	7
(Nova Scotia) Heather Smith-Dacey	4
(Manitoba) Darcy Robertson	6
(Manitoba) Joelle Brown	5
(Ontario) Cathy Auld	3
(British Columbia) Kelly Scott	6
(Manitoba) Jill Thurston	4

Quarterfinals
(Ontario) Tracy Horgan	4
(Manitoba) Darcy Robertson	3
(Manitoba) Joelle Brown	4
(British Columbia) Kelly Scott	6

Semifinals
(Ontario) Tracy Horgan	3
(Ontario) Rachel Homan	4
(British Columbia) Kelly Scott	7
(Alberta) Renée Sonnenberg	0

To Qualifier 3
(Ontario) Rachel Homan	9
(British Columbia) Kelly Scott	3
Qualifier 3
(Ontario) Rachel Homan	5
(Saskatchewan) Stefanie Lawton	4

Second Knockout		Semifinals		To Qualifier 3
(Alberta) Heather Nedohin	6
(Alberta) Valerie Sweeting	3	(Alberta) Heather Nedohin	6
(Sweden) Anette Norberg	5	(Manitoba) Cathy Overton-Clapham	5
(Manitoba) Cathy Overton-Clapham	6			(Alberta) Heather Nedohin	2
				(Saskatchewan) Stefanie Lawton	7

Second Knockout		Semifinals		To Qualifier 4
(Saskatchewan) Amber Holland	4
(Manitoba) Chelsea Carey	3	(Saskatchewan) Amber Holland	2
(Alberta) Shannon Kleibrink	8	(Alberta) Shannon Kleibrink	7
(Quebec) Marie-France Larouche	4			(Alberta) Shannon Kleibrink	6
				(Sweden) Margaretha Sigfridsson	2

Second Knockout
(Manitoba) Kim Link	4
(Alberta) Jessie Kaufman	6
(Manitoba) Lisa DeRiviere	3
(Manitoba) Barb Spencer	6
(Manitoba) Janet Harvey	4
(Alberta) Crystal Webster	5
(Ontario) Krista McCarville	9
(Manitoba) Colleen Kilgallen	4

Quarterfinals
(Alberta) Jessie Kaufman	8
(Manitoba) Barb Spencer	7
(Alberta) Crystal Webster	4
(Ontario) Krista McCarville	6

Semifinals
(Alberta) Jessie Kaufman	2
(Alberta) Cheryl Bernard	6
(Ontario) Krista McCarville	6
(Ontario) Sherry Middaugh	5

To Qualifier 4
(Alberta) Cheryl Bernard	2
(Ontario) Krista McCarville	9
Qualifier 4
(Alberta) Shannon Kleibrink	5
(Ontario) Krista McCarville	3

=== C event ===
Third Knockout
(Manitoba) Karen Fallis	3
(Nova Scotia) Heather Smith-Dacey	6

Quarterfinals
(Saskatchewan) Amber Holland	5
(Nova Scotia) Heather Smith-Dacey	2
(Alberta) Jessie Kaufman	6
(Ontario) Sherry Middaugh	5

Semifinals
(Saskatchewan) Amber Holland	6
(Alberta) Jessie Kaufman	4

Qualifier 5
(Saskatchewan) Amber Holland	3
(Saskatchewan) Stefanie Lawton	4

Third Knockout
(Ontario) Cathy Auld	6
(Manitoba) Jill Thurston	7
(Manitoba) Darcy Robertson	7
(Manitoba) Joelle Brown	4

Quarterfinals
(Manitoba) Jill Thurston	3
(Alberta) Valerie Sweeting	10
(Sweden) Anette Norberg	7
(Manitoba) Darcy Robertson	3

Semifinals
(Alberta) Valerie Sweeting	1
(Sweden) Margaretha Sigfridsson	6
(Sweden) Anette Norberg	1
(Alberta) Cheryl Bernard	5

Qualifier 6
(Sweden) Margaretha Sigfridsson	4
(Alberta) Cheryl Bernard	5

Third Knockout
(Manitoba) Barb Spencer	7
(Alberta) Crystal Webster	2
(Manitoba) Kim Link	3
(Manitoba) Lisa DeRiviere	8

Quarterfinals
(Manitoba) Chelsea Carey	3
(Manitoba) Barb Spencer	6
(Quebec) Marie-France Larouche	6
(Manitoba) Lisa DeRiviere	5

Semifinals
(Manitoba) Barb Spencer	7
(British Columbia) Kelly Scott	6
(Quebec) Marie-France Larouche	8
(Alberta) Heather Nedohin	3

Qualifier 7
(Manitoba) Barb Spencer	7
(Quebec) Marie-France Larouche	1

Third Knockout
(Manitoba) Janet Harvey	8
(Manitoba) Colleen Kilgallen	5

Quarterfinals
(Ontario) Tracy Horgan	2
(Alberta) Renée Sonnenberg	8
(Manitoba) Cathy Overton-Clapham	6
(Manitoba) Janet Harvey	7

Semifinals
(Alberta) Renée Sonnenberg	4
(Manitoba) Janet Harvey	2

Qualifier 8
(Alberta) Renée Sonnenberg	7
(Ontario) Krista McCarville	1

== Playoffs ==
Quarterfinals
(Manitoba) Kaitlyn Lawes	5
(Alberta) Cheryl Bernard	6
(Ontario) Rachel Homan	5
(Manitoba) Barb Spencer	2
(Alberta) Laura Crocker	3
(Saskatchewan) Stefanie Lawton	4
(Alberta) Shannon Kleibrink	8
(Alberta) Renée Sonnenberg	5

Semifinals
(Alberta) Cheryl Bernard	3
(Ontario) Rachel Homan	6
(Saskatchewan) Stefanie Lawton	7
(Alberta) Shannon Kleibrink	3

Final
(Ontario) Rachel Homan	4
(Saskatchewan) Stefanie Lawton	6
