= 2012 Players' Championship =

Grand Slam of Curling event

2012 Sun Life Financial Players' Championship
- Host city: Summerside, Prince Edward Island
- Arena: Consolidated Credit Union Place
- Dates: April 17–22
- Men's winner: (Ontario) John Epping
- Curling club: Donalda Curling Club, Toronto
- Skip: John Epping
- Third: Scott Bailey
- Second: Scott Howard
- Lead: David Mathers
- Finalist: (Ontario) Glenn Howard
- Women's winner: (Saskatchewan) Stefanie Lawton
- Curling club: Nutana Curling Club, Saskatoon
- Skip: Stefanie Lawton
- Third: Sherry Anderson
- Second: Sherri Singler
- Lead: Marliese Kasner
- Finalist: (Manitoba) Cathy Overton-Clapham

The 2012 Sun Life Financial Players' Championship was held from April 17 to 22 at the Consolidated Credit Union Place in Summerside, Prince Edward Island. It was the last Grand Slam event of the 2011–12 curling season and the twentieth time the tournament has been held. The purse is CAD$100,000 for both the men's and women's tournaments, and the winner of each tournament will receive CAD$18,000.

The Players' Championship was televised on Global Television Network across Canada, since CBC Sports had dropped its broadcast of Grand Slams prior to The National.

== Men ==
=== Teams ===
The teams are listed as follows:

Skip	Third	Second	Lead	Locale
Sebastian Kraupp (Note: Kraupp, who usually plays as third on Niklas Edin's team, played as skip. Edin sat out as the team's alternate due to a back injury. James Grattan filled the void from Edin's absence and played as third on the team.)	James Grattan	Fredrik Lindberg	Viktor Kjäll	Karlstad, Sweden
John Epping	Scott Bailey	Scott Howard	David Mathers	Toronto, Ontario
Brad Gushue	Adam Casey	Brett Gallant (Note: Brett Gallant played as Gushue's second after Ryan Fry, Gushue's third in the 2011–12 season, left the team.)	Geoff Walker	St. John's, Newfoundland and Labrador
Glenn Howard	Wayne Middaugh	Brent Laing	Craig Savill	Coldwater, Ontario
Kevin Koe	Pat Simmons	Carter Rycroft	Nolan Thiessen	Edmonton, Alberta
Kevin Martin	John Morris	Marc Kennedy	Ben Hebert	Edmonton, Alberta
Mike McEwen	B. J. Neufeld	Matt Wozniak	Denni Neufeld	Winnipeg, Manitoba
Jeff Stoughton	Jon Mead	Reid Carruthers	Mark Nichols (Note: Mark Nichols, the former longtime third for Brad Gushue, played as lead for Stoughton at the championship in order to complete Stoughton's rink, which dropped lead Steve Gould following the Manitoba provincials.)	Winnipeg, Manitoba

=== Round-robin standings ===
Skip	W	L
(Ontario) John Epping	5	2
(Ontario) Glenn Howard	5	2
(Manitoba) Mike McEwen	5	2
(Alberta) Kevin Martin	5	2
(Alberta) Kevin Koe	3	4
(Newfoundland and Labrador) Brad Gushue	3	4
(Manitoba) Jeff Stoughton	1	6
(Sweden) Sebastian Kraupp	1	6

=== Round-robin results ===
All times listed in Atlantic Daylight Time (UTC−03).

==== Draw 3 ====
Wednesday, April 18, 12:00 pm

Sheet A	1	2	3	4	5	6	7	8	Final
(Alberta) Kevin Koe 🔨	1	1	2	0	0	1	0	0	5
(Manitoba) Jeff Stoughton	0	0	0	0	2	0	1	1	4

Sheet D	1	2	3	4	5	6	7	8	Final
(Sweden) Sebastian Kraupp	0	0	0	0	1	0	0	X	1
(Newfoundland and Labrador) Brad Gushue 🔨	0	0	0	1	0	2	1	X	4

==== Draw 4 ====
Wednesday, April 18, 4:00 pm

Sheet A	1	2	3	4	5	6	7	8	Final
(Manitoba) Mike McEwen	0	1	0	1	0	2	0	X	4
(Ontario) John Epping 🔨	1	0	3	0	2	0	2	X	8

Sheet B	1	2	3	4	5	6	7	8	Final
(Ontario) Glenn Howard 🔨	1	0	2	0	3	0	0	4	10
(Newfoundland and Labrador) Brad Gushue	0	2	0	2	0	2	1	0	7

Sheet C	1	2	3	4	5	6	7	8	Final
(Sweden) Sebastian Kraupp	0	2	0	0	2	0	0	0	4
(Manitoba) Jeff Stoughton 🔨	2	0	0	1	0	0	0	2	5

Sheet D	1	2	3	4	5	6	7	8	Final
(Alberta) Kevin Martin 🔨	0	2	1	0	0	0	3	X	6
(Alberta) Kevin Koe	0	0	0	0	2	2	0	X	4

==== Draw 5 ====
Wednesday, April 18, 7:30 pm

Sheet C	1	2	3	4	5	6	7	8	Final
(Manitoba) Mike McEwen	0	2	0	2	0	1	0	0	5
(Ontario) Glenn Howard 🔨	2	0	1	0	1	0	3	1	8

Sheet E	1	2	3	4	5	6	7	8	Final
(Alberta) Kevin Martin 🔨	0	1	0	3	0	0	1	X	5
(Ontario) John Epping	0	0	1	0	0	1	0	X	2

==== Draw 7 ====
Thursday, April 19, 12:00 pm

Sheet A	1	2	3	4	5	6	7	8	Final
(Alberta) Kevin Martin 🔨	0	0	0	3	0	0	0	1	4
(Newfoundland and Labrador) Brad Gushue	0	0	0	0	0	2	0	0	2

Sheet B	1	2	3	4	5	6	7	8	Final
(Manitoba) Mike McEwen	0	0	2	0	0	0	0	2	4
(Manitoba) Jeff Stoughton 🔨	1	1	0	0	0	1	0	0	3

Sheet C	1	2	3	4	5	6	7	8	Final
(Alberta) Kevin Koe	1	0	2	0	2	0	1	X	6
(Sweden) Sebastian Kraupp 🔨	0	1	0	1	0	1	0	X	3

Sheet D	1	2	3	4	5	6	7	8	Final
(Ontario) Glenn Howard 🔨	0	0	0	1	0	2	0	X	3
(Ontario) John Epping	1	0	2	0	2	0	1	X	6

==== Draw 9 ====
Thursday, April 19, 7:30 pm

Sheet A	1	2	3	4	5	6	7	8	9	Final
(Alberta) Kevin Koe	0	0	3	1	0	0	1	1	0	6
(Ontario) John Epping 🔨	1	1	0	0	3	1	0	0	1	7

Sheet B	1	2	3	4	5	6	7	8	Final
(Alberta) Kevin Martin 🔨	2	0	0	0	3	0	0	1	6
(Sweden) Sebastian Kraupp	0	0	2	1	0	0	1	0	4

Sheet D	1	2	3	4	5	6	7	8	9	Final
(Manitoba) Mike McEwen	0	0	2	0	2	0	2	0	1	7
(Newfoundland and Labrador) Brad Gushue 🔨	2	1	0	1	0	1	0	1	0	6

Sheet E	1	2	3	4	5	6	7	8	Final
(Ontario) Glenn Howard	0	1	0	0	0	4	0	1	6
(Manitoba) Jeff Stoughton 🔨	1	0	0	1	0	0	2	0	4

==== Draw 10 ====
Friday, April 20, 8:30 am

Sheet A	1	2	3	4	5	6	7	8	Final
(Ontario) Glenn Howard	0	1	1	0	1	0	0	X	3
(Sweden) Sebastian Kraupp 🔨	1	0	0	1	0	2	1	X	5

Sheet B	1	2	3	4	5	6	7	8	Final
(Alberta) Kevin Koe 🔨	1	0	1	0	1	0	4	X	7
(Newfoundland and Labrador) Brad Gushue	0	1	0	1	0	1	0	X	3

Sheet C	1	2	3	4	5	6	7	8	Final
(Manitoba) Mike McEwen	0	0	0	1	0	3	0	2	6
(Alberta) Kevin Martin	0	1	1	0	1	0	1	0	4

Sheet D	1	2	3	4	5	6	7	8	Final
(Manitoba) Jeff Stoughton	0	0	1	0	0	X	X	X	1
(Ontario) John Epping 🔨	0	1	0	4	2	X	X	X	7

==== Draw 12 ====
Friday, April 20, 3:30 pm

Sheet A	1	2	3	4	5	6	7	8	9	Final
(Manitoba) Jeff Stoughton	0	3	0	0	0	2	0	1	0	6
(Newfoundland and Labrador) Brad Gushue 🔨	1	0	1	1	2	0	1	0	1	7

Sheet B	1	2	3	4	5	6	7	8	Final
(Sweden) Sebastian Kraupp 🔨	1	0	0	1	0	1	0	X	3
(Ontario) John Epping	0	2	0	0	3	0	2	X	7

Sheet D	1	2	3	4	5	6	7	8	Final
(Ontario) Glenn Howard 🔨	2	0	1	1	0	2	0	0	6
(Alberta) Kevin Martin	0	1	0	0	3	0	0	1	5

Sheet E	1	2	3	4	5	6	7	8	Final
(Manitoba) Mike McEwen 🔨	2	0	0	0	0	0	1	1	5
(Alberta) Kevin Koe	0	2	0	0	2	0	0	0	4

==== Draw 13 ====
Friday, April 20, 7:30 pm

Sheet B	1	2	3	4	5	6	7	8	Final
(Alberta) Kevin Martin 🔨	3	0	0	2	0	1	0	1	7
(Manitoba) Jeff Stoughton	0	2	0	0	2	0	2	0	6

Sheet C	1	2	3	4	5	6	7	8	Final
(Ontario) Glenn Howard 🔨	1	2	0	2	0	3	X	X	8
(Alberta) Kevin Koe	0	0	0	0	2	0	X	X	2

Sheet D	1	2	3	4	5	6	7	8	Final
(Manitoba) Mike McEwen	0	2	1	1	0	2	X	X	6
(Sweden) Sebastian Kraupp 🔨	1	0	0	0	1	0	X	X	2

Sheet E	1	2	3	4	5	6	7	8	Final
(Newfoundland and Labrador) Brad Gushue	0	1	0	1	0	1	1	1	5
(Ontario) John Epping 🔨	1	0	0	0	1	0	0	0	2

=== Playoffs ===
Semifinals
(Ontario) John Epping	6
(Alberta) Kevin Martin	4
(Ontario) Glenn Howard	7
(Manitoba) Mike McEwen	3

Final
(Ontario) John Epping	7
(Ontario) Glenn Howard	6

==== Semifinals ====
Saturday, April 21, 7:30 pm

Sheet B	1	2	3	4	5	6	7	8	Final
(Ontario) John Epping	0	0	0	2	0	0	3	1	6
(Alberta) Kevin Martin 🔨	2	1	0	0	1	0	0	0	4

Sheet D	1	2	3	4	5	6	7	8	Final
(Ontario) Glenn Howard 🔨	2	0	4	0	1	0	X	X	7
(Manitoba) Mike McEwen	0	1	0	1	0	1	X	X	3

==== Final ====
Sunday, April 22, 1:00 pm

Sheet C	1	2	3	4	5	6	7	8	Final
(Ontario) John Epping	0	3	0	2	0	1	0	1	7
(Ontario) Glenn Howard 🔨	1	0	2	0	1	0	2	0	6

== Women ==
=== Teams ===
The teams are listed as follows:

Skip	Third	Second	Lead	Locale
Chelsea Carey	Kristy McDonald	Kristen Foster	Lindsay Titheridge	Morden, Manitoba
Jennifer Jones	Kaitlyn Lawes	Jill Officer	Dawn Askin	Winnipeg, Manitoba
Stefanie Lawton	Sherry Anderson	Sherri Singler	Marliese Kasner	Saskatoon, Saskatchewan
Sherry Middaugh	Jo-Ann Rizzo	Lee Merklinger	Leigh Armstrong	Coldwater, Ontario
Eve Muirhead	Anna Sloan	Vicki Adams	Claire Hamilton	Perth, Scotland
Heather Nedohin	Beth Iskiw	Jessica Mair	Laine Peters	Edmonton, Alberta
Cathy Overton-Clapham	Jenna Loder	Ashley Howard	Breanne Meakin	Winnipeg, Manitoba
Silvana Tirinzoni	Irene Schori	Esther Neuenschwander	Sandra Gantenbein	Aarau, Switzerland

=== Round-robin standings ===
Skip	W	L
(Manitoba) Cathy Overton-Clapham	6	1
(Saskatchewan) Stefanie Lawton	5	2
(Manitoba) Jennifer Jones	5	2
(Ontario) Sherry Middaugh	4	3
(Alberta) Heather Nedohin	4	3
(Switzerland) Silvana Tirinzoni	3	4
(Scotland) Eve Muirhead	1	6
(Manitoba) Chelsea Carey	0	7

=== Round-robin results ===
All times listed in Atlantic Daylight Time (UTC−03).

==== Draw 1 ====
Tuesday, April 17, 7:00 pm

Sheet A	1	2	3	4	5	6	7	8	Final
(Alberta) Heather Nedohin	0	0	0	0	0	1	1	X	2
(Switzerland) Silvana Tirinzoni 🔨	0	0	2	1	0	0	0	X	3

Sheet B	1	2	3	4	5	6	7	8	9	Final
(Manitoba) Cathy Overton-Clapham 🔨	2	0	1	3	0	0	0	0	1	7
(Scotland) Eve Muirhead	0	1	0	0	2	1	1	1	0	6

Sheet C	1	2	3	4	5	6	7	8	Final
(Manitoba) Jennifer Jones 🔨	1	0	1	0	0	0	X	X	2
(Saskatchewan) Stefanie Lawton	0	2	0	3	1	1	X	X	7

Sheet D	1	2	3	4	5	6	7	8	Final
(Ontario) Sherry Middaugh	1	2	0	1	0	1	0	1	6
(Manitoba) Chelsea Carey 🔨	0	0	1	0	1	0	1	0	3

==== Draw 2 ====
Wednesday, April 18, 8:30 am

Sheet B	1	2	3	4	5	6	7	8	Final
(Switzerland) Silvana Tirinzoni 🔨	0	0	1	2	0	2	0	1	6
(Saskatchewan) Stefanie Lawton	2	2	0	0	1	0	2	0	7

Sheet C	1	2	3	4	5	6	7	8	Final
(Ontario) Sherry Middaugh	1	3	1	1	0	X	X	X	6
(Scotland) Eve Muirhead 🔨	0	0	0	0	1	X	X	X	1

Sheet D	1	2	3	4	5	6	7	8	Final
(Alberta) Heather Nedohin	0	1	0	0	1	0	1	X	3
(Manitoba) Cathy Overton-Clapham 🔨	2	0	1	1	0	3	0	X	7

Sheet E	1	2	3	4	5	6	7	8	9	Final
(Manitoba) Jennifer Jones 🔨	1	0	0	2	0	1	2	0	1	7
(Manitoba) Chelsea Carey	0	1	1	0	2	0	0	2	0	6

==== Draw 3 ====
Wednesday, April 18, 12:00 pm

Sheet B	1	2	3	4	5	6	7	8	Final
(Manitoba) Jennifer Jones	0	0	1	0	0	0	1	X	2
(Alberta) Heather Nedohin 🔨	0	2	0	0	2	1	0	X	5

Sheet C	1	2	3	4	5	6	7	8	9	Final
(Switzerland) Silvana Tirinzoni 🔨	0	2	0	1	0	0	2	1	1	7
(Manitoba) Chelsea Carey	2	0	1	0	1	2	0	0	0	6

Sheet E	1	2	3	4	5	6	7	8	Final
(Ontario) Sherry Middaugh 🔨	2	0	1	0	0	2	0	0	5
(Manitoba) Cathy Overton-Clapham	0	1	0	1	2	0	1	1	6

==== Draw 4 ====
Wednesday, April 18, 4:00 pm

Sheet E	1	2	3	4	5	6	7	8	Final
(Scotland) Eve Muirhead 🔨	0	0	0	1	0	2	0	X	3
(Saskatchewan) Stefanie Lawton	1	0	1	0	4	0	1	X	7

==== Draw 5 ====
Wednesday, April 18, 7:30 pm

Sheet A	1	2	3	4	5	6	7	8	Final
(Manitoba) Cathy Overton-Clapham	0	0	1	0	6	0	X	X	7
(Saskatchewan) Stefanie Lawton 🔨	0	1	0	1	0	1	X	X	3

Sheet B	1	2	3	4	5	6	7	8	9	Final
(Scotland) Eve Muirhead 🔨	0	2	0	0	1	0	1	0	1	5
(Manitoba) Chelsea Carey	0	0	1	0	0	1	0	2	0	4

Sheet D	1	2	3	4	5	6	7	8	Final
(Manitoba) Jennifer Jones	1	0	0	1	0	4	0	4	10
(Switzerland) Silvana Tirinzoni 🔨	0	0	2	0	2	0	1	0	5

==== Draw 6 ====
Thursday, April 19, 8:30 am

Sheet A	1	2	3	4	5	6	7	8	9	Final
(Scotland) Eve Muirhead 🔨	2	3	0	0	0	1	1	0	0	7
(Switzerland) Silvana Tirinzoni	0	0	2	2	2	0	0	1	2	9

Sheet B	1	2	3	4	5	6	7	8	Final
(Manitoba) Jennifer Jones 🔨	0	2	1	0	0	2	0	3	8
(Ontario) Sherry Middaugh	1	0	0	2	0	0	1	0	4

Sheet D	1	2	3	4	5	6	7	8	Final
(Manitoba) Cathy Overton-Clapham	1	0	2	0	0	0	0	1	4
(Manitoba) Chelsea Carey 🔨	0	2	0	0	0	1	0	0	3

Sheet E	1	2	3	4	5	6	7	8	9	Final
(Alberta) Heather Nedohin 🔨	0	2	0	1	0	3	0	0	1	7
(Saskatchewan) Stefanie Lawton	1	0	1	0	2	0	1	1	0	6

==== Draw 8 ====
Thursday, April 19, 4:00 pm

Sheet A	1	2	3	4	5	6	7	8	Final
(Ontario) Sherry Middaugh 🔨	2	0	1	0	0	1	1	0	5
(Saskatchewan) Stefanie Lawton	0	1	0	2	1	0	0	2	6

Sheet B	1	2	3	4	5	6	7	8	Final
(Alberta) Heather Nedohin 🔨	2	0	0	0	3	0	3	0	8
(Manitoba) Chelsea Carey	0	3	0	1	0	1	0	1	6

Sheet C	1	2	3	4	5	6	7	8	Final
(Manitoba) Cathy Overton-Clapham 🔨	1	0	1	0	1	0	2	1	6
(Switzerland) Silvana Tirinzoni	0	2	0	1	0	1	0	0	4

Sheet D	1	2	3	4	5	6	7	8	Final
(Manitoba) Jennifer Jones 🔨	2	2	0	0	2	X	X	X	6
(Scotland) Eve Muirhead	0	0	1	0	0	X	X	X	1

==== Draw 9 ====
Thursday, April 19, 7:30 pm

Sheet C	1	2	3	4	5	6	7	8	Final
(Ontario) Sherry Middaugh 🔨	0	0	2	1	0	0	0	1	4
(Alberta) Heather Nedohin	0	0	0	0	0	0	2	0	2

==== Draw 11 ====
Friday, April 20, 12:00 pm

Sheet A	1	2	3	4	5	6	7	8	Final
(Manitoba) Jennifer Jones	1	0	2	1	0	2	0	X	6
(Manitoba) Cathy Overton-Clapham	0	1	0	0	1	0	1	X	3

Sheet C	1	2	3	4	5	6	7	8	Final
(Manitoba) Chelsea Carey	0	2	0	0	0	X	X	X	2
(Saskatchewan) Stefanie Lawton	1	0	4	1	1	X	X	X	7

Sheet D	1	2	3	4	5	6	7	8	9	Final
(Ontario) Sherry Middaugh 🔨	0	2	2	0	0	0	1	0	1	6
(Switzerland) Silvana Tirinzoni	1	0	0	2	1	0	0	1	0	5

Sheet E	1	2	3	4	5	6	7	8	Final
(Alberta) Heather Nedohin 🔨	2	0	2	0	0	0	1	X	5
(Scotland) Eve Muirhead	0	1	0	0	0	2	0	X	3

==== Tiebreaker ====
Friday, April 20, 7:30 pm

Sheet A	1	2	3	4	5	6	7	8	Final
(Ontario) Sherry Middaugh 🔨	1	0	0	0	0	1	3	1	6
(Alberta) Heather Nedohin	0	2	1	1	1	0	0	0	5

=== Playoffs ===
Semifinals
(Manitoba) Cathy Overton-Clapham	7
(Ontario) Sherry Middaugh	6
(Saskatchewan) Stefanie Lawton	6
(Manitoba) Jennifer Jones	3

Final
(Manitoba) Cathy Overton-Clapham	3
(Saskatchewan) Stefanie Lawton	7

==== Semifinals ====
Saturday, April 21, 8:30 am

Sheet B	1	2	3	4	5	6	7	8	9	Final
(Manitoba) Cathy Overton-Clapham 🔨	2	0	1	0	1	0	2	0	1	7
(Ontario) Sherry Middaugh	0	3	0	0	0	1	0	2	0	6

Sheet D	1	2	3	4	5	6	7	8	Final
(Saskatchewan) Stefanie Lawton 🔨	2	0	0	2	1	0	1	X	6
(Manitoba) Jennifer Jones	0	1	1	0	0	1	0	X	3

==== Final ====
Saturday, April 21, 1:00 pm

Sheet C	1	2	3	4	5	6	7	8	Final
(Manitoba) Cathy Overton-Clapham 🔨	0	1	0	1	1	0	0	X	3
(Saskatchewan) Stefanie Lawton	0	0	2	0	0	3	2	X	7
