= Stefanie Lawton =

Canadian curler

- Curler
- Born: Stefanie Miller; June 20, 1980 (age 46); Prince Albert, Saskatchewan, Canada

Team
- Curling club: Twin Rivers CC, North Battleford, Saskatchewan

Curling career
- Member Association: Saskatchewan
- Hearts: 6 (2005, 2009, 2014, 2015, 2019, 2020)
- Top CTRS ranking: 3rd (2004-05, 2012-13)
- Grand Slam victories: 4 (2006 Wayden Transportation, 2012 Manitoba Lotteries, 2012 Colonial Square, 2012 Players')
Medal record
Women's curling
Representing Canada
World Junior Championships
Silver medal – second place	2000 Geising
Representing Saskatchewan
Canadian Olympic Curling Trials
Bronze medal – third place	2005 Halifax
Scotties Tournament of Hearts
Bronze medal – third place	2019 Sydney

Stefanie Lawton (née Miller; born June 20, 1980) is a Canadian curler from Saskatoon, Saskatchewan.

== Career ==
After an appearance at the 1997 Canadian Junior Curling Championships, she would go on to win the 2000 Canadian Junior Curling Championships with the help of her team of sister Marliese Miller (third), Stacy Helm (second) and Amanda MacDonald (lead). At the worlds that year, she would win the silver medal behind Matilda Mattsson of Sweden. At the 2001 Canadian Juniors, Lawton (then known as Stefanie Miller) went on to be undefeated at the Junior championships, only to lose to Prince Edward Island's Suzanne Gaudet. Four years later, Lawton returned to the curling scene by becoming the Saskatchewan women's champion and, as such, going to the 2005 Scott Tournament of Hearts. Her team of her sister Marliese, Sherri Singler and Chelsey Bell finished the round-robin in third place but lost to Ontario in the 3-4 playoff game. The team would also compete at the 2005 Canadian Olympic Curling Trials. At the trials, the team finished round robin with a 6–3 record and earned a spot in the playoffs, but lost to Shannon Kleibrink's team in the semifinal.

The Lawton team lost the 2008 provincial final to Michelle Englot. However, the team rebounded and won the 2008 Canada Cup of Curling defeating Kelly Scott in the final.

Lawton won her second Saskatchewan Scotties Tournament of Hearts in 2009, earning her rink a spot at the 2009 Scotties Tournament of Hearts. The team made the playoffs, but lost in the 3 vs. 4 game to Jennifer Jones.

Lawton's rink was one of four that received an automatic bye to the 2009 Canadian Olympic Curling Trials. Her team finished 4–3, out of the playoffs.

In 2010, Anderson joined the team to play third.

Lawton won her second Canada Cup in 2010, defeating Olympic silver medalist Cheryl Bernard in the final.

2012 was one of Lawton's best curling years to date. She wrapped up the 2011-12 curling season by winning the 2012 Players' Championship. To begin the next season, Lawton's team won two more Grand Slam events, winning the 2012 Manitoba Lotteries Women's Curling Classic and the 2012 Colonial Square Ladies Classic. Lawton also won her third Canada Cup in 2012, defeating the Kaitlyn Lawes rink (Team Jennifer Jones) in the final.

At the 2013 Canadian Olympic Curling Trials, Lawton's team finished the round robin with a disappointing 2–5 record, missing the playoffs. However the team would bounce back winning the 2014 Saskatchewan Scotties Tournament of Hearts defeating Michelle Englot. Her team represented the province at the 2014 Scotties Tournament of Hearts in Montreal, finishing 4th yet again, after losing the 3-4 Page Playoff game to Valerie Sweeting and to Chelsea Carey in the bronze-medal game.

Her team represented Saskatchewan at the 2015 Scotties Tournament of Hearts in Moose Jaw, finishing 4th once again, after losing the bronze-medal game to Rachel Homan. After the season, Anderson was replaced with Trish Paulsen on the team.

Lawton played with Steve Laycock in the 2016 Canadian Mixed Doubles Curling Trials, but won just 2 games, and lost 5, and missed the playoffs.

Between 2016 and 2018, Lawton went through a number of team changes, and didn't have the same success as she had earlier in her career. In 2018, she joined the Robyn Silvernagle rink at third. The team had a strong start to the season, winning the 2018 Red Deer Curling Classic and Saskatchewan Women's Curling Tour events in Humboldt and Saskatoon. With the 2019 Canadian Open being held in North Battleford, the Silvernagle rink qualified for the event as the sponsor's exemption. The team qualified for the playoffs with a 3–1 record in the triple knockout format, before losing to Silvana Tirinzoni in the quarter-final.

The Silvernagle rink won the 2019 Saskatchewan Scotties Tournament of Hearts with a steal in the final end against Sherry Anderson. Representing Saskatchewan at the 2019 Scotties Tournament of Hearts, the rink went 8–3 in the round robin and championship pools, before eventually losing the semi-final to Ontario and winning the bronze medal. The team had semi-final and quarterfinal finishes at the 2019 Players' Championship and the 2019 Champions Cup respectively.

Team Silvernagle missed the playoffs in the first two Slams of the 2019–20 season, the Masters and the Tour Challenge. They competed at the 2019 Canada Cup where her team finished with a 1–5 record. They defended their provincial title at the 2020 Saskatchewan Scotties Tournament of Hearts when they once again bested Sherry Anderson in the final. At the 2020 Scotties Tournament of Hearts, Team Silvernagle led Saskatchewan to a 6–5 record, finishing in fifth. It would be the team's last event of the season as both the Players' Championship and the Champions Cup Grand Slam events were cancelled due to the COVID-19 pandemic. On March 11, 2020, Lawton announced she would be stepping back from competitive curling.

== Personal life ==
Lawton is employed as a chartered professional accountant with Cameco. She is married and has two children. She grew up on a farm near Shellbrook, Saskatchewan and has a CPA. Her father is Bob Miller, who won a gold medal at the 1969 Canadian Junior Curling Championships and won a bronze medal at the 1985 Labatt Brier.

== Grand Slam record ==
Key
C	Champion
F	Lost in Final
SF	Lost in Semifinal
QF	Lost in Quarterfinals
R16	Lost in the round of 16
Q	Did not advance to playoffs
T2	Played in Tier 2 event
DNP	Did not participate in event
N/A	Not a Grand Slam event that season

Event	2006–07	2007–08	2008–09	2009–10	2010–11	2011–12	2012–13	2013–14	2014–15 (Note: Lawton did not play at the beginning of the 2014-15 season due to her pregnancy. She returned to her team in January in time for the Saskatchewan Scotties Tournament of hearts.)	2015–16	2016–17	2017–18	2018–19	2019–20
Masters	N/A	N/A	N/A	N/A	N/A	N/A	Q	QF	DNP	DNP	DNP	DNP	DNP	Q
Tour Challenge	N/A	N/A	N/A	N/A	N/A	N/A	N/A	N/A	N/A	DNP	T2	T2	DNP	Q
The National	N/A	N/A	N/A	N/A	N/A	N/A	N/A	N/A	N/A	SF	DNP	DNP	DNP	QF
Canadian Open	N/A	N/A	N/A	N/A	N/A	N/A	N/A	N/A	DNP	Q	DNP	DNP	QF	DNP
Players'	QF	Q	Q	SF	DNP	C	SF	QF	DNP	DNP	DNP	DNP	SF	N/A
Champions Cup	N/A	N/A	N/A	N/A	N/A	N/A	N/A	N/A	N/A	QF	DNP	DNP	QF	N/A

=== Former events ===
Event	2006–07	2007–08	2008–09	2009–10	2010–11	2011–12	2012–13	2013–14	2014–15*	2015-16
Sobeys Slam	N/A	QF	F	N/A	QF	N/A	N/A	N/A	N/A	N/A
Wayden Transportation	C	F	F	N/A	N/A	N/A	N/A	N/A	N/A	N/A
Manitoba Liquor & Lotteries	SF	Q	Q	DNP	SF	QF	C	DNP	N/A	N/A
Autumn Gold	Q	QF	SF	QF	QF	QF	SF	SF	DNP	N/A
Colonial Square	N/A	N/A	N/A	N/A	N/A	QF	C	Q	DNP	N/A
