= Marliese Kasner =

Canadian curler

- Curler
- Born: Marliese Miller; January 8, 1982 (age 44); Prince Albert, Saskatchewan

Team
- Curling club: Nutana CC, Saskatoon, SK

Curling career
- Hearts: 5 (2005, 2009, 2014, 2015, 2019)
- World Mixed Doubles Championship: 1 (2016)
- Top CTRS ranking: 3rd (2004-05, 2012-13)
- Grand Slam victories: 4: Wayden Transportation:1 (2006); Manitoba Liquor & Lotteries: 1 (2012); Colonial Square: 1 (2012); Players' Championships: 1 (2012)
Medal record
Curling
Representing Canada
World Junior Championships
Gold medal – first place	2003 Flims
Silver medal – second place	2000 Geising
Representing Saskatchewan
Scotties Tournament of Hearts
Bronze medal – third place	2019 Sydney
Canadian Olympic Curling Trials
Bronze medal – third place	2005 Halifax
Canadian Mixed Doubles Trials
Bronze medal – third place	2016 Saskatoon

Marliese Kasner (née Miller; born January 8, 1982, in Prince Albert, Saskatchewan) is a Canadian curler from Shellbrook, Saskatchewan. She is a former member of her sister Stefanie Lawton's team.

== Career ==
Kasner is a two-time Canadian Junior Champion, having won the title in 2000 playing third for her sister, and winning it in her own right as skip in 2003. At the 2000 World Junior Curling Championships, Kasner won a silver medal with her sister, and at the 2003 World Juniors, she won the gold medal for Canada, defeating Cassandra Johnson of the United States in the final.

After Juniors, Kasner joined back with her sister, playing as her third. In 2005, the Lawton rink won the Saskatchewan Scott Tournament of Hearts and would represent Saskatchewan at the 2005 Scott Tournament of Hearts for the first time. At the 2005 Scott Tournament of Hearts the team finished 3rd with a 7–4 record and earned themselves a playoff spot. In the 3 vs. 4 page playoff game they lost to Manitoba's Jennifer Jones. They would also compete at the 2005 Canadian Olympic Curling Trials. At the trials, the team finished round robin with a 6–3 record and earned a spot in the playoffs, but lost to Shannon Kleibrink's team in the semifinal. Team Lawton would lose back to back provincials to Betker in 2008 and Englot in 2009. However, the team rebounded and won the 2008 Canada Cup of Curling defeating Kelly Scott in the final. The team won their second provincial title when they defeated Rene Miettinen at the 2009 Saskatchewan Scotties Tournament of Hearts. The team made the playoffs, but lost in the 3 vs. 4 game to Jennifer Jones once again. Lawton's rink was one of four that received an automatic bye to the 2009 Canadian Olympic Curling Trials. The team finished 4-3 and earned a tiebreaker match where they lost to Krista McCarville and out of the playoffs.

In 2010 Kasner made the switch from third to lead when Anderson joined the team. They would go on and win the Canada Cup in 2010, defeating Olympic silver medalist Cheryl Bernard and also in 2012 where they defeated Olympic Gold Medalist Kaityln Lawes (Team Jones). At the 2013 Canadian Olympic Curling Trials, Lawton's team finished the round robin with a disappointing 2–5 record, missing the playoffs. After losing the 2011, 2012, 2013 provincial championship, the team won their 3rd title at the 2014 Saskatchewan Scotties Tournament of Hearts after defeating Michelle Englot. The team represented the province at the 2014 Scotties Tournament of Hearts in Montreal, finishing 4th yet again, after losing the 3-4 Page Playoff game to Valerie Sweeting and to Chelsea Carey in the bronze-medal game. Team Lawton will once again represent Saskatchewan for the fourth time at the 2015 Scotties Tournament of Hearts in Moose Jaw.

Competing with Dustin Kalthoff in the 2016 World Curling Federation Mixed Doubles Championships, their 5th-place finish earned Canada the points needed to qualify for the event in the 2018 Olympics.

== Personal life ==
Kasner is employed as a teacher with the Saskatchewan Rivers School Division. She is married and has three sons. Her father is Bob Miller, who won a gold medal at the 1969 Canadian Junior Curling Championships and won a bronze medal at the 1985 Labatt Brier.
