= Sherri Singler =

Canadian curler

- Curler
- Born: Sherri Leonard; February 19, 1974 (age 52); Saskatoon, Saskatchewan

Team
- Curling club: Callie CC, Regina, SK
- Skip: Amber Holland
- Third: Jill Shumay
- Second: Sherri Singler
- Lead: Ternna Derdall

Curling career
- Member Association: Saskatchewan
- Hearts: 3 (2005, 2009, 2014)
- Top CTRS ranking: 3rd (2004–05, 2012–13)
- Grand Slam victories: 4: Wayden Transportation:1 (2006); Manitoba Liquor & Lotteries: 1 (2012); Colonial Square: 1 (2012); Players' Championships: 1 (2012)
Medal record
Women's curling
Canadian Olympic Curling Trials
Bronze medal – third place	2005 Halifax

Sherri Nadine Singler (born February 19, 1974, in Saskatoon, Saskatchewan as Sherri Leonard) is a Canadian curler. She currently plays second on Team Amber Holland.

== Career ==
Growing up, Singler was a skilled track and field athlete, setting a provincial age-group discus record. Singler won a bronze medal in discus at the 1991 Canadian Junior Track & Field Championships and she competed for Saskatchewan at the 1993 Canada Summer Games. She earned a scholarship to the University of New Mexico, but an arm injury forced her to quit. Following her injury, Singler switched to curling.

Singler joined the Lawton rink in 2003 after having played for the Patty Rocheleau rink since 1999. She has played second for the team ever since. With the team, she has won four Grand Slam events (the 2006 Wayden Transportation Ladies Classic, the 2012 Players' Championship, the 2012 Manitoba Lotteries Women's Curling Classic and the 2012 Colonial Square Ladies Classic), three Canada Cups (2008, 2010 and 2012) and three provincial championships (2005, 2009 and 2014). As a result, she has played in three Scotties Tournament of Hearts representing Saskatchewan. At both the 2005 Scott Tournament of Hearts and 2009 Scotties Tournament of Hearts, the team placed 4th. She has also played in three Canadian Olympic Curling Trials. At the 2005 Canadian Olympic Curling Trials, the team finished third, losing in the semi-final to Shannon Kleibrink. At the 2009 Canadian Olympic Curling Trials, the team placed 5th and at the 2013 Canadian Olympic Curling Trials, the team finished 7th.

== Personal life ==
Singler is the Owner and Broker of Record for Coldwell Banker Signature, a Real Estate company in Saskatoon, Saskatchewan.
