= Sherry Anderson =

Canadian curler

- Curler
- Born: January 6, 1964 (age 62); Prince Albert, Saskatchewan, Canada

Team
- Curling club: Nutana CC, Saskatoon, SK
- Skip: Sherry Anderson
- Third: Patty Hersikorn
- Second: Denise Hersikorn
- Lead: Anita Silvernagle

Curling career
- Member Association: Saskatchewan
- Hearts: 10 (1994, 1995, 2000, 2002, 2004, 2005, 2014, 2015, 2018, 2021)
- Top CTRS ranking: 1st (2003–04)
- Grand Slam victories: 4: Casinos of Winnipeg: 1 (2006); Manitoba Liquor & Lotteries: 1 (2012); Colonial Square: 1 (2012); Players' Championships: 1 (2012)
Medal record
Curling
Representing Canada
World Senior Championships
Gold medal – first place	2018 Östersund
Gold medal – first place	2019 Stavanger
Gold medal – first place	2023 Gangneung
Representing Saskatchewan
Scotties Tournament of Hearts
Silver medal – second place	2002 Brandon
Bronze medal – third place	1994 Kitchener
Canadian Olympic Trials
Silver medal – second place	2001 Regina

Sherry Anderson (born January 6, 1964) is a Canadian curler from Delisle, Saskatchewan. She is a record three-time winner of the World Senior Curling Championships for Canada. She currently coaches the Nancy Martin rink.

== Career ==
Anderson has been to ten Scotties Tournament of Hearts, six as a skip. She qualified for her first Hearts by winning the 1994 Saskatchewan women's championship, defeating Leanne Whitrow in the final, 7–4. At the 1994 Scott Tournament of Hearts, her team lost in the semi-final. Anderson won her second provincial title in 1995, defeating Michelle Schneider (Englot) in the final, 7–5. At the 1995 Scott Tournament of Hearts, she finished out of the playoffs with a 6–5 record. At the 2000 Scott Tournament of Hearts, Anderson was the alternate for June Campbell. Anderson skipped one of the top teams in the country in the late 90s, but wasn't able to win a provincial championship again until 2002. In the meantime, she qualified for the 2001 Canadian Olympic Curling Trials by being the top earning women's team in 1999–2000 season. At the Trials, she made it to the finals, before losing to Kelley Law. Anderson returned to the Scotts as a skip at the 2002 Scott Tournament of Hearts. There, her team of Kim Hodson, Sandra Mulroney and Donna Gignac lost in the final to Colleen Jones. Two years later, Anderson finished 7–4 at the 2004 Scott Tournament of Hearts. In 2004, Anderson was awarded the Marj Mitchell Sportsmanship Award at the Tournament of Hearts.

In 2010, Anderson joined team Stefanie Lawton to play as her third. She played with Lawton until 2014, at which point she took over the team for one season.

Anderson reached the final of the 2016 Canadian Senior Curling Championships, and since then has won a record five-straight times; in 2017, 2018, 2019, 2021 and 2022. She won a gold medal for Canada at the 2018, 2019 and 2023 World Senior Curling Championships.

She was inducted into the Canadian Curling Hall of Fame in 2024.

== Personal life ==
Anderson is an owner/partner of C&S Promotions. She is married and has three stepchildren.

== Grand Slam record ==
Key
C	Champion
F	Lost in Final
SF	Lost in Semifinal
QF	Lost in Quarterfinals
R16	Lost in the round of 16
Q	Did not advance to playoffs
T2	Played in Tier 2 event
DNP	Did not participate in event
N/A	Not a Grand Slam event that season

Event	2005–06	2006–07	2007–08	2008–09	2009–10	2010–11	2011–12	2012–13	2013–14	2014–15
Masters	N/A	N/A	N/A	N/A	N/A	N/A	N/A	Q	QF	Q
Players'	Q	Q	QF	DNP	SF	DNP	C	SF	QF	DNP

=== Former events ===
Event	2006–07	2007–08	2008–09	2009–10	2010–11	2011–12	2012–13	2013–14	2014–15
Autumn Gold	Q	Q	QF	Q	QF	QF	QF	SF	Q
Colonial Square	N/A	N/A	N/A	N/A	N/A	N/A	C	Q	Q
Manitoba Lotteries	C	Q	Q	Q	SF	QF	C	DNP	N/A
Wayden Transportation	QF	SF	Q	N/A	N/A	N/A	N/A	N/A	N/A
Sobeys Slam	N/A	Q	DNP	N/A	QF	N/A	N/A	N/A	N/A
