= 2012 Boundary Ford Curling Classic =

World Curling Tour event

- Host city: Lloydminster, Alberta
- Arena: Lloydminster Curling Club
- Dates: November 30 – December 3
- Winner: (Alberta) Renée Sonnenberg
- Curling club: Saville SC, Edmonton
- Skip: Renée Sonnenberg
- Third: Lawnie MacDonald
- Second: Cary-Anne Sallows
- Lead: Rona Pasika
- Finalist: (Alberta) Casey Scheidegger

The 2012 Boundary Ford Curling Classic was held from November 30 to December 3 at the Lloydminster Curling Club in Lloydminster, Alberta as part of the 2012–13 World Curling Tour. The event was held in a triple knockout format, and the purse for the event was CAD$32,000, of which the winner, Renée Sonnenbergr, received CAD$8,000. Sonnenberg defeated Casey Scheidegger in the final with a score of 10–6.

== Teams ==
Teams are listed as follows:

Skip	Third	Second	Lead	Locale
Brett Barber	Robyn Silvernagle	Kailena Bay	Dayna Demmans	Regina, Saskatchewan
Cheryl Bernard	Susan O'Connor	Lori Olson-Johns	Shannon Aleksic	Calgary, Alberta
Laura Crocker	Sarah Wilkes	Rebecca Pattison	Jen Gates	Edmonton, Alberta
Deanna Doig	Kim Schneider	Colleen Ackerman	Michelle McIvor	Kronau, Saskatchewan
Tanilla Doyle	Joelle Horn	Lindsay Amundsen-Meyer	Christina Faulkner	Edmonton, Alberta
Chantelle Eberle	Nancy Inglis	Debbie Lozinski	Susan Hoffart	Regina, Saskatchewan
Lisa Eyamie	Maria Bushell	Jodi Marthaller	Valerie Hamende	Calgary, Alberta
Alicia Wegner (fourth)	Ashlee Foster (skip)	Jennifer Stiglitz	Giselle Gervais	Lloydminster, Alberta
Tiffany Game	Vanessa Pouliot	Jennifer Van Wieren	Melissa Pierce	Edmonton, Alberta
Brittany Gregor	Lindsay Blyth	Hayley Furst	Tara Tanchak	Calgary, Alberta
Teryn Hamilton	Holly Scott	Logan Conway	Karen Vanthuyne	Calgary, Alberta
Amber Holland	Jolene Campbell	Brooklyn Lemon	Dailene Sivertson	Regina, Saskatchewan
Heather Jensen	Shana Snell	Heather Rogers	Carly Quigley	Airdrie, Alberta
Lisa Johnson	Michelle Ries	Natalie Holloway	Shauna Nordstrom	Edmonton, Alberta
Jessie Kaufman	Nicky Kaufman	Kelly Erickson	Stephanie Enright	Edmonton, Alberta
Shannon Kleibrink	Bronwen Webster	Kalynn Park	Chelsey Matson	Calgary, Alberta
Sarah Koltun	Chelsea Duncan	Patty Wallingham	Jenna Duncan	Whitehorse, Yukon
Lindsay Makichuk	Amy Janko	Jessica Monk	Kristina Hadden	Edmonton, Alberta
Chana Martineau	Pam Appleman	Brittany Zelmer	Jennifer Sheehan	Edmonton, Alberta
Amy Nixon	Nadine Chyz	Whitney Eckstrand	Tracy Bush	Calgary/Red Deer, Alberta
Trish Paulsen	Kari Kennedy	Sarah Collins	Kari Paulsen	Saskatoon, Saskatchewan
Leslie Rogers	Suzanne Walker	Jenilee Goertzen	Kelsey Latawiec	Edmonton, Alberta
Casey Scheidegger	Michele Smith	Jessie Scheidegger	Kimberly Anderson	Lethbridge, Alberta
Jill Shumay	Kara Johnston	Taryn Holtby	Jinaye Ayrey	Saskatoon, Saskatchewan
Ashley Skjerdal	Jordan Maas	Shelby Hubick	Amanda Kuzyk	Regina, Saskatchewan
Renée Sonnenberg	Lawnie MacDonald	Cary-Anne Sallows	Rona Pasika	Grande Prairie, Alberta
Tiffany Steuber	Megan Anderson	Lisa Miller	Cindy Westgard	Edmonton, Alberta
Karallee Swabb	Brenda Doroshuk	Melanie Swabb	Paula Knight	Edmonton, Alberta
Valerie Sweeting	Dana Ferguson	Joanne Taylor	Rachelle Pidherny	Edmonton, Alberta
Holly Whyte	Heather Steele	Cori Dunbar	Jamie Forth	Edmonton, Alberta
Kelly Wood	Teejay Haichert	Kelsey Dutton	Janelle Tyler	Swift Current, Saskatchewan
Nola Zingel	Heather Kuntz	Jill Watson	Melissa McKee	Lloydminster, Alberta

== Knockout results ==
The draw is listed as follows:

=== A event ===
First Knockout
(Alberta) Shannon Kleibrink	10
(Alberta) Ashlee Foster	5
(Alberta) Tiffany Steuber	5
(Alberta) Tiffany Game	7
(Saskatchewan) Chantelle Eberle	3
(Alberta) Teryn Hamilton	5
(Alberta) Amy Nixon	9
(Yukon) Sarah Koltun	4
(Alberta) Laura Crocker	10
(Alberta) Karallee Swabb	2
(Saskatchewan) Deanna Doig	11
(Alberta) Lindsay Makichuk	6
(Alberta) Valerie Sweeting	11
(Saskatchewan) Ashley Skjerdal	4
(Saskatchewan) Trish Paulsen	9
(Saskatchewan) Kelly Wood	5

Quarterfinals
(Alberta) Shannon Kleibrink	4
(Alberta) Tiffany Game	9
(Alberta) Teryn Hamilton	1
(Alberta) Amy Nixon	8
(Alberta) Laura Crocker	6
(Saskatchewan) Deanna Doig	5
(Alberta) Valerie Sweeting	3
(Saskatchewan) Trish Paulsen	5

Semifinals
(Alberta) Tiffany Game	0
(Alberta) Amy Nixon	8
(Alberta) Laura Crocker	7
(Saskatchewan) Trish Paulsen	5

Qualifier 1
(Alberta) Amy Nixon	7
(Alberta) Laura Crocker	5

First Knockout
(Alberta) Cheryl Bernard	W
(Alberta) Brittany Gregor	L
(Saskatchewan) Jill Shumay	5
(Alberta) Heather Jensen	1
(Alberta) Jessie Kaufman	9
(Alberta) Holly Whyte	6
(Alberta) Lisa Eyamie	10
(Saskatchewan) Brett Barber	9
(Alberta) Renée Sonnenberg	11
(Alberta) Nola Zingel	6
(Alberta) Leslie Rogers	10
(Alberta) Lisa Johnson	3
(Saskatchewan) Amber Holland	10
(Alberta) Chana Martineau	6
(Alberta) Casey Scheidegger	10
(Alberta) Tanilla Doyle	3

Quarterfinals
(Alberta) Cheryl Bernard	9
(Saskatchewan) Jill Shumay	2
(Alberta) Jessie Kaufman	11
(Alberta) Lisa Eyamie	6
(Alberta) Renée Sonnenberg	8
(Alberta) Leslie Rogers	2
(Saskatchewan) Amber Holland	7
(Alberta) Casey Scheidegger	6

Semifinals
(Alberta) Cheryl Bernard	8
(Alberta) Jessie Kaufman	6
(Alberta) Renée Sonnenberg	9
(Saskatchewan) Amber Holland	7

Qualifier 2
(Alberta) Cheryl Bernard	8
(Alberta) Renée Sonnenberg	6

=== B event ===
Second Knockout
(Alberta) Ashlee Foster	5
(Alberta) Tiffany Steuber	6
(Yukon) Sarah Koltun	3
(Saskatchewan) Chantelle Eberle	10

Quarterfinals
(Saskatchewan) Deanna Doig	5
(Alberta) Tiffany Steuber	6
(Alberta) Valerie Sweeting	9
(Saskatchewan) Chantelle Eberle	4

Semifinals
(Alberta) Tiffany Steuber	7
(Alberta) Jessie Kaufman	6
(Alberta) Valerie Sweeting	4
(Saskatchewan) Amber Holland	6

To Qualifier 3
(Alberta) Tiffany Steuber	6
(Saskatchewan) Amber Holland	7
Qualifier 3
(Saskatchewan) Amber Holland	4
(Alberta) Laura Crocker	8

Second Knockout
(Alberta) Karallee Swabb	10
(Alberta) Lindsay Makichuk	6
(Saskatchewan) Ashley Skjerdal	4
(Saskatchewan) Kelly Wood	10

Quarterfinals
(Alberta) Shannon Kleibrink	8
(Alberta) Karallee Swabb	1
(Alberta) Teryn Hamilton	4
(Saskatchewan) Kelly Wood	8

Semifinals
(Alberta) Shannon Kleibrink	7
(Saskatchewan) Kelly Wood	2

To Qualifier 3
(Alberta) Shannon Kleibrink	2
(Alberta) Laura Crocker	8

Second Knockout
(Alberta) Brittany Gregor	L
(Alberta) Heather Jensen	W
(Alberta) Holly Whyte	7
(Saskatchewan) Brett Barber	5

Quarterfinals
(Alberta) Leslie Rogers	0
(Alberta) Heather Jensen	6
(Alberta) Casey Scheidegger	8
(Alberta) Holly Whyte	3

Semifinals
(Alberta) Heather Jensen	3
(Alberta) Tiffany Game	6
(Alberta) Casey Scheidegger	4
(Saskatchewan) Trish Paulsen	5

To Qualifier 4
(Alberta) Tiffany Game	8
(Saskatchewan) Trish Paulsen	1
Qualifier 4
(Alberta) Tiffany Game	5
(Alberta) Renée Sonnenberg	6

Second Knockout
(Alberta) Nola Zingel	8
(Alberta) Lisa Johnson	1
(Alberta) Chana Martineau	4
(Alberta) Tanilla Doyle	6

Quarterfinals
(Saskatchewan) Jill Shumay	8
(Alberta) Nola Zingel	1
(Alberta) Lisa Eyamie	6
(Alberta) Tanilla Doyle	7

Semifinals
(Saskatchewan) Jill Shumay	5
(Alberta) Tanilla Doyle	7

To Qualifier 4
(Alberta) Tanilla Doyle	2
(Alberta) Renée Sonnenberg	9

=== C event ===
Third Knockout
(Alberta) Ashlee Foster	3
(Yukon) Sarah Koltun	8
(Alberta) Leslie Rogers	5
(Alberta) Holly Whyte	4

Quarterfinals
(Alberta) Heather Jensen	7
(Yukon) Sarah Koltun	6
(Saskatchewan) Jill Shumay	8
(Alberta) Leslie Rogers	6

Semifinals
(Alberta) Heather Jensen	5
(Saskatchewan) Jill Shumay	6

Qualifier 5
(Saskatchewan) Jill Shumay	6
(Saskatchewan) Amber Holland	8

Third Knockout
(Alberta) Lindsay Makichuk	5
(Saskatchewan) Ashley Skjerdal	9

Quarterfinals
(Alberta) Nola Zingel	5
(Alberta) Lisa Eyamie	9
(Alberta) Casey Scheidegger	9
(Saskatchewan) Ashley Skjerdal	3

Semifinals
(Alberta) Lisa Eyamie	9
(Alberta) Shannon Kleibrink	8
(Alberta) Casey Scheidegger	9
(Alberta) Tiffany Steuber	4

Qualifier 6
(Alberta) Lisa Eyamie	1
(Alberta) Casey Scheidegger	8

Third Knockout
(Alberta) Brittany Gregor	L
(Saskatchewan) Brett Barber	W

Quarterfinals
(Alberta) Valerie Sweeting	8
(Saskatchewan) Brett Barber	5
(Alberta) Karallee Swabb	0
(Alberta) Teryn Hamilton	9

Semifinals
(Alberta) Valerie Sweeting	6
(Alberta) Tanilla Doyle	3
(Alberta) Teryn Hamilton	4
(Saskatchewan) Trish Paulsen	6

Qualifier 7
(Alberta) Valerie Sweeting	6
(Saskatchewan) Trish Paulsen	3

Third Knockout
(Saskatchewan) Deanna Doig	9
(Saskatchewan) Chantelle Eberle	5
(Alberta) Lisa Johnson	3
(Alberta) Chana Martineau	8

Quarterfinals
(Saskatchewan) Kelly Wood	6
(Saskatchewan) Deanna Doig	3
(Alberta) Jessie Kaufman	8
(Alberta) Chana Martineau	3

Semifinals
(Saskatchewan) Kelly Wood	8
(Alberta) Jessie Kaufman	2

Qualifier 8
(Saskatchewan) Kelly Wood	7
(Alberta) Tiffany Game	6

== Playoffs ==
Quarterfinals
(Alberta) Amy Nixon	5
(Saskatchewan) Kelly Wood	9
(Alberta) Renée Sonnenberg	8
(Saskatchewan) Amber Holland	4
(Alberta) Cheryl Bernard	6
(Alberta) Valerie Sweeting	8
(Alberta) Laura Crocker	6
(Alberta) Casey Scheidegger	7

Semifinals
(Saskatchewan) Kelly Wood	5
(Alberta) Renée Sonnenberg	6
(Alberta) Valerie Sweeting	9
(Alberta) Casey Scheidegger	10

Final
(Alberta) Renée Sonnenberg	10
(Alberta) Casey Scheidegger	6
