= 2012 Colonial Square Ladies Classic =

World Curling Tour event

- Host city: Saskatoon, Saskatchewan
- Arena: Nutana Curling Club
- Dates: November 8–12
- Winner: (Saskatchewan) Stefanie Lawton
- Curling club: Nutana CC, Saskatoon
- Skip: Stefanie Lawton
- Third: Sherry Anderson
- Second: Sherri Singler
- Lead: Marliese Kasner
- Finalist: (Manitoba) Chelsea Carey

The 2012 Colonial Square Ladies Classic was held from November 8 to 12 at the Nutana Curling Club in Saskatoon, Saskatchewan. It was the third women's Grand Slam event of the 2012–13 World Curling Tour. The event was held in a triple knockout format with 48 teams, and the purse for the event was CAD$54,000. Lawton won her second Grand Slam and sixth Colonial Square Ladies Classic title with a win over Chelsea Carey in the final, stealing the winning point in the final end and winning with a score of 5–4.

== Teams ==
The teams are listed as follows:

Skip	Third	Second	Lead	Locale
Cathy Auld	Janet Murphy	Stephanie Gray	Melissa Foster	Mississauga, Ontario
Penny Barker	Susan Lang	Melissa Hoffman	Danielle Sicinski	Moose Jaw, Saskatchewan
Cheryl Bernard	Susan O'Connor	Lori Olson-Johns	Jennifer Sadleir	Calgary, Alberta
Erika Brown	Debbie McCormick	Jessica Schultz	Ann Swisshelm	Madison, Wisconsin
Chelsea Carey	Kristy Jenion	Kristen Foster	Lindsay Titheridge	Morden, Manitoba
Alexandra Carlson	Monica Walker	Kendall Moulton	Jordan Moulton	(United States) Minneapolis, Minnesota
Candace Chisholm	Cindy Ricci	Natalie Bloomfield	Kristy Johnson	Regina, Saskatchewan
Laura Crocker	Sarah Wilkes	Rebecca Pattison	Jen Gates	Edmonton, Alberta
Deanna Doig	Kim Schneider	Colleen Ackerman	Michelle McIvor	Kronau, Saskatchewan
Tanilla Doyle	Joelle Horn	Lindsay Amundsen-Meyer	Christina Faulkner	Edmonton, Alberta
Chantelle Eberle	Nancy Inglis	Debbie Lozinski	Susan Hoffart	Regina, Saskatchewan
Kerri Einarson	Sara Van Walleghem	Liz Fyfe	Krysten Karwacki	Winnipeg, Manitoba
Lana Vey (fourth)	Michelle Englot (skip)	Roberta Materi	Sarah Slywka	Regina, Saskatchewan
Lisa Eyamie	Maria Bushell	Jodi Marthaller	Valerie Hamende	High River, Alberta
Rachel Fritzler	Ashley Quick	Amy Merkosky	Natalie Yanko	Saskatchewan
Amber Holland	Jolene Campbell	Brooklyn Lemon	Dailene Sivertson	Regina, Saskatchewan
Rachel Homan	Emma Miskew	Alison Kreviazuk	Lisa Weagle	Ottawa, Ontario
Tracy Horgan	Jenn Horgan	Jenna Enge	Amanda Gates	Sudbury, Ontario
Michèle Jäggi	Marisa Winkelhausen	Stéphanie Jäggi	Melanie Barbezat	Bern, Switzerland
Jessie Kaufman	Nicky Kaufman	Kelly Erickson	Cori Morris	Edmonton, Alberta
Nancy Martin (fourth)	Kara Kilden (skip)	Lindsay Bertschi	Krista White	Saskatoon, Saskatchewan
Shannon Kleibrink	Bronwen Webster	Kalynn Park	Chelsey Matson	Calgary, Alberta
Kaitlyn Lawes	Kirsten Wall	Jill Officer	Dawn Askin	Winnipeg, Manitoba
Stefanie Lawton	Sherry Anderson	Sherri Singler	Marliese Kasner	Saskatoon, Saskatchewan
Deanne Miller-Jones	Carla Sawicki	Donna Ell	Carla Anaka	Saskatchewan
Ekaterina Antonova (fourth)	Victorya Moiseeva (skip)	Galina Arsenkina	Aleksandra Saitova	Moscow, Russia
Kristie Moore	Blaine Richards	Michelle Dykstra	Amber Cheveldave	Grande Prairie, Alberta
Eve Muirhead	Anna Sloan	Vicki Adams	Claire Hamilton	Stirling, Scotland
Larissa Murray	Amanda Craigie	Leah Mihalicz	Nicole Lang	Regina, Saskatchewan
Heather Nedohin	Beth Iskiw	Jessica Mair	Laine Peters	Edmonton, Alberta
Amy Nixon	Nadine Chyz	Whitney Eckstrand	Tracy Bush	Calgary/Red Deer, Alberta
Mirjam Ott	Carmen Schäfer	Carmen Küng	Janine Greiner	Davos, Switzerland
Cathy Overton-Clapham	Jenna Loder	Ashley Howard	Breanne Meakin	Winnipeg, Manitoba
Trish Paulsen	Kari Kennedy	Sarah Collin	Kari Paulsen	Saskatoon, Saskatchewan
Allison Pottinger	Nicole Joraanstad	Natalie Nicholson	Tabitha Peterson	(United States) St. Paul, Minnesota
Sarah Rhyno	Jenn Brine	Christie Lang	Kaitlin Fralic	Halifax, Nova Scotia
Darcy Robertson	Tracey Lavery	Venessa Foster	Michelle Kruk	Winnipeg, Manitoba
Leslie Rogers	Suzanne Walker	Jenilee Goertzen	Kelsey Latawiec	Edmonton, Alberta
Jennifer Schab	Sheri Pickering	Jody Kiem	Heather Hansen	Calgary, Alberta
Kelly Scott	Jeanna Schraeder	Sasha Carter	Sarah Wazney	Kelowna, British Columbia
Jill Shumay	Kara Johnston	Taryn Holtby	Jinaye Ayrey	Saskatoon, Saskatchewan
Anna Sidorova	Ludmila Privivkova	Margarita Fomina	Ekaterina Galkina	Moscow, Russia
Manuela Siegrist	Alina Pätz	Nadine Lehmann	Nicole Dünki	Basel, Switzerland
Renée Sonnenberg	Lawnie MacDonald	Cary-Anne Sallows	Rona Pasika	Edmonton, Alberta
Ros Stewart	Patty Hersikorn	Brandee Borne	Andrea Rudulier	Saskatoon, Saskatchewan
Valerie Sweeting	Dana Ferguson	Joanne Taylor	Rachelle Pidherny	Edmonton, Alberta
Silvana Tirinzoni	Marlene Albrecht	Esther Neuenschwander	Sandra Gantenbein	Switzerland
Crystal Webster	Erin Carmody	Geri-Lynn Ramsay	Samantha Preston	Calgary, Alberta
Kelly Wood	Teejay Haichert	Kelsey Dutton	Janelle Tyler	Swift Current, Saskatchewan

== Knockout Draw Brackets ==
The draw is listed as follows:

=== A event ===
First Knockout
(Alberta) Heather Nedohin	5
(Saskatchewan) Ros Stewart	7
(Saskatchewan) Michelle Englot	6
(Saskatchewan) Deanna Doig	3
(Saskatchewan) Trish Paulsen	9
(Alberta) Jessie Kaufman	6
(United States) Alexandra Carlson	1
(Russia) Anna Sidorova	10
(Alberta) Crystal Webster	5
(Manitoba) Kerri Einarson	3
(Alberta) Shannon Kleibrink	5
(Saskatchewan) Jill Shumay	2
(United States) Allison Pottinger	8
(Ontario) Cathy Auld	7
(Saskatchewan) Kelly Wood	2
(Switzerland) Mirjam Ott	5

Quarterfinals
(Saskatchewan) Ros Stewart	6
(Saskatchewan) Michelle Englot	2
(Saskatchewan) Trish Paulsen	4
(Russia) Anna Sidorova	5
(Alberta) Crystal Webster	7
(Alberta) Shannon Kleibrink	4
(United States) Allison Pottinger	8
(Switzerland) Mirjam Ott	5

Semifinals
(Saskatchewan) Ros Stewart	4
(Russia) Anna Sidorova	6
(Alberta) Crystal Webster	5
(United States) Allison Pottinger	7

Qualifier 1
(Russia) Anna Sidorova	6
(United States) Allison Pottinger	5

First Knockout
(Manitoba) Cathy Overton-Clapham	7
(Nova Scotia) Sarah Rhyno	3
(Alberta) Valerie Sweeting	5
(Saskatchewan) Chantelle Eberle	6
(Manitoba) Chelsea Carey	7
(Saskatchewan) Penny Barker	6
(Ontario) Rachel Homan	6
(Switzerland) Manuela Siegrist	3
(Alberta) Cheryl Bernard	5
(Saskatchewan) Candace Chisholm	1
(Wisconsin) Erika Brown	4
(Saskatchewan) Amber Holland	5
(Switzerland) Michèle Jäggi	8
(Alberta) Lisa Eyamie	4
(Scotland) Eve Muirhead	7
(Alberta) Leslie Rogers	6

Quarterfinals
(Manitoba) Cathy Overton-Clapham	2
(Saskatchewan) Chantelle Eberle	4
(Manitoba) Chelsea Carey	5
(Ontario) Rachel Homan	3
(Alberta) Cheryl Bernard	6
(Saskatchewan) Amber Holland	2
(Switzerland) Michèle Jäggi	5
(Scotland) Eve Muirhead	4

Semifinals
(Saskatchewan) Chantelle Eberle	3
(Manitoba) Chelsea Carey	6
(Alberta) Cheryl Bernard	0
(Switzerland) Michèle Jäggi	9

Qualifier 2
(Manitoba) Chelsea Carey	5
(Switzerland) Michèle Jäggi	1

First Knockout
(Manitoba) Kaitlyn Lawes	5
(Saskatchewan) Rachel Fritzler	4
(Alberta) Laura Crocker	7
(Saskatchewan) Deanne Miller-Jones	2
(Switzerland) Silvana Tirinzoni	7
(Alberta) Tanilla Doyle	6
(Alberta) Amy Nixon	2
(Manitoba) Darcy Robertson	0
(Alberta) Renée Sonnenberg	6
(Saskatchewan) Larissa Murray	3
(Ontario) Tracy Horgan	6
(Russia) Victorya Moiseeva	4
(British Columbia) Kelly Scott	2
(Alberta) Kristie Moore	0
(Saskatchewan) Stefanie Lawton	7
(Saskatchewan) Kara Kilden	5

Quarterfinals
(Manitoba) Kaitlyn Lawes	2
(Alberta) Laura Crocker	6
(Switzerland) Silvana Tirinzoni	5
(Alberta) Amy Nixon	6
(Alberta) Renée Sonnenberg	6
(Ontario) Tracy Horgan	7
(British Columbia) Kelly Scott	5
(Saskatchewan) Stefanie Lawton	7

Semifinals
(Alberta) Laura Crocker	6
(Alberta) Amy Nixon	4
(Ontario) Tracy Horgan	3
(Saskatchewan) Stefanie Lawton	5

Qualifier 3
(Alberta) Laura Crocker	3
(Saskatchewan) Stefanie Lawton	5

=== B event ===
Second Knockout
(Manitoba) Kerri Einarson	5
(Saskatchewan) Jill Shumay	7
(Ontario) Cathy Auld	8
(Saskatchewan) Kelly Wood	7

Quarterfinals
(Saskatchewan) Michelle Englot	9
(Saskatchewan) Jill Shumay	2
(Saskatchewan) Trish Paulsen	2
(Ontario) Cathy Auld	7

Semifinals
(Saskatchewan) Michelle Englot	4
(Ontario) Cathy Auld	8

Qualifier 4
(Ontario) Cathy Auld	4
(Alberta) Laura Crocker	5

Second Knockout
(Alberta) Heather Nedohin	3
(Saskatchewan) Deanna Doig	8
(United States) Alexandra Carlson	2
(Alberta) Jessie Kaufman	8

Quarterfinals
(Alberta) Shannon Kleibrink	5
(Saskatchewan) Deanna Doig	3
(Switzerland) Mirjam Ott	9
(Alberta) Jessie Kaufman	8

Semifinals
(Alberta) Shannon Kleibrink	6
(Alberta) Cheryl Bernard	5
(Switzerland) Mirjam Ott	5
(Saskatchewan) Chantelle Eberle	6

Qualifier 5
(Alberta) Shannon Kleibrink	6
(Saskatchewan) Chantelle Eberle	5

Second Knockout
(Saskatchewan) Candace Chisholm	6
(Wisconsin) Erika Brown	7
(Alberta) Lisa Eyamie	6
(Alberta) Leslie Rogers	4

Quarterfinals
(Manitoba) Cathy Overton-Clapham	7
(Wisconsin) Erika Brown	5
(Ontario) Rachel Homan	5
(Alberta) Lisa Eyamie	3

Semifinals
(Manitoba) Cathy Overton-Clapham	4
(Ontario) Rachel Homan	5

Qualifier 6
(Ontario) Rachel Homan	6
(United States) Allison Pottinger	2

Second Knockout
(Nova Scotia) Sarah Rhyno	3
(Alberta) Valerie Sweeting	6
(Saskatchewan) Penny Barker	3
(Switzerland) Manuela Siegrist	6

Quarterfinals
(Saskatchewan) Amber Holland	6
(Alberta) Valerie Sweeting	5
(Scotland) Eve Muirhead	8
(Switzerland) Manuela Siegrist	1

Semifinals
(Saskatchewan) Amber Holland	5
(Ontario) Tracy Horgan	3
(Scotland) Eve Muirhead	6
(Saskatchewan) Ros Stewart	5

Qualifier 7
(Saskatchewan) Amber Holland	5
(Scotland) Eve Muirhead	7

Second Knockout
(Saskatchewan) Larissa Murray	7
(Russia) Victorya Moiseeva	4
(Alberta) Kristie Moore	7
(Saskatchewan) Kara Kilden	4

Quarterfinals
(Manitoba) Kaitlyn Lawes	8
(Saskatchewan) Larissa Murray	6
(Switzerland) Silvana Tirinzoni	5
(Alberta) Kristie Moore	2

Semifinals
(Manitoba) Kaitlyn Lawes	9
(Switzerland) Silvana Tirinzoni	3

Qualifier 8
(Manitoba) Kaitlyn Lawes	7
(Switzerland) Michèle Jäggi	4

Second Knockout
(Saskatchewan) Rachel Fritzler	6
(Saskatchewan) Deanne Miller-Jones	1
(Alberta) Tanilla Doyle	6
(Manitoba) Darcy Robertson	7

Quarterfinals
(Alberta) Renée Sonnenberg	10
(Saskatchewan) Rachel Fritzler	7
(British Columbia) Kelly Scott	6
(Manitoba) Darcy Robertson	7

Semifinals
(Alberta) Renée Sonnenberg	8
(Alberta) Amy Nixon	1
(Manitoba) Darcy Robertson	4
(Alberta) Crystal Webster	6

Qualifier 9
(Alberta) Renée Sonnenberg	4
(Alberta) Crystal Webster	6

=== C event ===
Third Knockout
(Wisconsin) Erika Brown	6
(Saskatchewan) Larissa Murray	7
(Alberta) Heather Nedohin	6
(United States) Alexandra Carlson	4

Quarterfinals
(Saskatchewan) Larissa Murray	2
(Switzerland) Mirjam Ott	9
(Alberta) Valerie Sweeting	2
(Alberta) Heather Nedohin	7

Semifinals
(Switzerland) Mirjam Ott	7
(Ontario) Cathy Auld	1
(Alberta) Heather Nedohin	5
(Manitoba) Darcy Robertson	4

Qualifier 10
(Switzerland) Mirjam Ott	5
(Alberta) Heather Nedohin	8

Third Knockout
(Manitoba) Kerri Einarson	5
(Saskatchewan) Kelly Wood	6

Quarterfinals
(Switzerland) Manuela Siegrist	6
(Saskatchewan) Kelly Wood	4

Semifinals
(Switzerland) Manuela Siegrist	6
(Alberta) Cheryl Bernard	5

To Qualifier 11
(Switzerland) Manuela Siegrist	3
(Alberta) Renée Sonnenberg	6
Qualifier 11
(Alberta) Renée Sonnenberg	7
(Saskatchewan) Amber Holland	8

Third Knockout		Semifinals		To Qualifier 11
(Alberta) Lisa Eyamie	7
(British Columbia) Kelly Scott	4	(Alberta) Lisa Eyamie	2
		(Switzerland) Silvana Tirinzoni	7
				(Switzerland) Silvana Tirinzoni	5
				(Saskatchewan) Amber Holland	8

Third Knockout
(Nova Scotia) Sarah Rhyno	6
(Saskatchewan) Penny Barker	2

Quarterfinals
(Saskatchewan) Rachel Fritzler	8
(Nova Scotia) Sarah Rhyno	6

Semifinals
(Saskatchewan) Rachel Fritzler	5
(Ontario) Tracy Horgan	4

To Qualifier 12
(Saskatchewan) Rachel Fritzler	2
(United States) Allison Pottinger	6
Qualifier 12
(United States) Allison Pottinger	6
(Switzerland) Michèle Jäggi	7

Third Knockout
(Saskatchewan) Candace Chisholm	6
(Alberta) Leslie Rogers	3

Quarterfinals
(Saskatchewan) Candace Chisholm	6
(Alberta) Kristie Moore	4

Semifinals
(Saskatchewan) Candace Chisholm	5
(Saskatchewan) Michelle Englot	6

To Qualifier 12
(Saskatchewan) Michelle Englot	3
(Switzerland) Michèle Jäggi	6

Third Knockout
(Alberta) Tanilla Doyle	5
(Saskatchewan) Deanne Miller-Jones	6

Quarterfinals
(Saskatchewan) Trish Paulsen	2
(Alberta) Jessie Kaufman	5
(Saskatchewan) Jill Shumay	6
(Saskatchewan) Deanne Miller-Jones	3

Semifinals
(Alberta) Jessie Kaufman	6
(Alberta) Amy Nixon	4
(Saskatchewan) Jill Shumay	4
(Saskatchewan) Ros Stewart	3

To Qualifier 13
(Alberta) Jessie Kaufman	9
(Saskatchewan) Jill Shumay	6
Qualifier 13
(Alberta) Jessie Kaufman	1
(Saskatchewan) Chantelle Eberle	7

Third Knockout		Quarterfinals		Semifinals		To Qualifier 13
				(Manitoba) Cathy Overton-Clapham	4
				(Russia) Victorya Moiseeva	8
		(Saskatchewan) Deanna Doig	3
(Russia) Victorya Moiseeva	5	(Russia) Victorya Moiseeva	5
(Saskatchewan) Kara Kilden	3					(Russia) Victorya Moiseeva	2
						(Saskatchewan) Chantelle Eberle	7

== Knockout results ==
All draw times listed in Central Standard Time.

Note that in Draws 2 through 12, draw times are staggered so that the second half of the draw's games begin one hour after the first half of the draw's games.

=== Draw 1 ===
Thursday, November 8, 8:00 pm

Team	1	2	3	4	5	6	7	8	Final
(Alberta) Heather Nedohin 🔨	1	0	0	0	2	2	0	X	5
(Saskatchewan) Ros Stewart	0	2	2	2	0	0	1	X	7

Team	1	2	3	4	5	6	7	8	Final
(Saskatchewan) Michelle Englot	0	3	0	0	2	0	1	X	6
(Saskatchewan) Deanna Doig 🔨	0	0	1	0	0	2	0	X	3

Team	1	2	3	4	5	6	7	8	9	Final
(Saskatchewan) Trish Paulsen	0	0	1	0	2	0	3	0	3	9
(Alberta) Jessie Kaufman 🔨	0	2	0	2	0	1	0	1	0	6

Team	1	2	3	4	5	6	7	8	Final
(United States) Alexandra Carlson	0	1	0	0	0	X	X	X	1
(Russia) Anna Sidorova 🔨	2	0	6	1	1	X	X	X	10

Team	1	2	3	4	5	6	7	8	Final
(Alberta) Crystal Webster 🔨	2	0	1	0	2	X	X	X	5
(Manitoba) Kerri Einarson	0	1	0	2	0	X	X	X	3

Team	1	2	3	4	5	6	7	8	Final
(Alberta) Shannon Kleibrink	0	0	4	0	1	X	X	X	5
(Saskatchewan) Jill Shumay 🔨	1	0	0	1	0	X	X	X	2

Team	1	2	3	4	5	6	7	8	Final
(United States) Allison Pottinger 🔨	3	0	2	0	1	1	0	1	8
(Ontario) Cathy Auld	0	2	0	3	0	0	2	0	7

Team	1	2	3	4	5	6	7	8	Final
(Saskatchewan) Kelly Wood	0	0	1	0	1	X	X	X	2
(Switzerland) Mirjam Ott 🔨	1	1	0	3	0	X	X	X	5

=== Draw 2 ===
Friday, November 9, 7:30 am

Team	1	2	3	4	5	6	7	8	Final
(Manitoba) Cathy Overton-Clapham 🔨	3	0	0	0	0	2	2	X	7
(Nova Scotia) Sarah Rhyno	0	0	1	1	1	0	0	X	3

Team	1	2	3	4	5	6	7	8	9	Final
(Alberta) Valerie Sweeting	0	0	0	1	0	2	1	1	0	5
(Saskatchewan) Chantelle Eberle 🔨	0	2	0	0	3	0	0	0	1	6

Team	1	2	3	4	5	6	7	8	Final
(Manitoba) Chelsea Carey	0	1	0	0	2	2	0	2	7
(Saskatchewan) Penny Barker 🔨	2	0	1	2	0	0	1	0	6

Team	1	2	3	4	5	6	7	8	Final
(Ontario) Rachel Homan	0	1	1	0	1	2	0	1	6
(Switzerland) Manuela Siegrist 🔨	0	0	0	1	0	0	2	0	3

Friday, November 9, 8:30 am

Team	1	2	3	4	5	6	7	8	Final
(Alberta) Cheryl Bernard 🔨	0	1	1	0	3	X	X	X	5
(Saskatchewan) Candace Chisholm	0	0	0	1	0	X	X	X	1

Team	1	2	3	4	5	6	7	8	9	Final
(Wisconsin) Erika Brown	0	1	0	1	0	0	1	1	0	4
(Saskatchewan) Amber Holland 🔨	1	0	1	0	2	0	0	0	1	5

Team	1	2	3	4	5	6	7	8	Final
(Switzerland) Michèle Jäggi 🔨	1	0	0	1	0	3	0	3	8
(Alberta) Lisa Eyamie	0	1	1	0	0	0	2	0	4

Team	1	2	3	4	5	6	7	8	9	Final
(Scotland) Eve Muirhead 🔨	2	0	0	0	2	0	2	0	1	7
(Alberta) Leslie Rogers	0	2	0	1	0	2	0	1	0	6

=== Draw 3 ===
Friday, November 9, 10:00 am

Team	1	2	3	4	5	6	7	8	Final
(Manitoba) Kaitlyn Lawes 🔨	2	0	0	1	1	0	1	0	5
(Saskatchewan) Rachel Fritzler	0	1	1	0	0	1	0	1	4

Team	1	2	3	4	5	6	7	8	Final
(Alberta) Laura Crocker	0	2	1	0	1	3	X	X	7
(Saskatchewan) Deanne Miller-Jones 🔨	1	0	0	1	0	0	X	X	2

Team	1	2	3	4	5	6	7	8	9	Final
(Switzerland) Silvana Tirinzoni 🔨	0	0	2	2	0	0	2	0	1	7
(Alberta) Tanilla Doyle	0	1	0	0	2	1	0	2	0	6

Team	1	2	3	4	5	6	7	8	Final
(Alberta) Amy Nixon 🔨	1	1	0	0	X	X	X	X	2
(Manitoba) Darcy Robertson	0	0	0	0	X	X	X	X	0

Friday, November 9, 11:00 am

Team	1	2	3	4	5	6	7	8	Final
(Alberta) Renée Sonnenberg	0	1	1	0	1	0	0	0	3
(Saskatchewan) Larissa Murray 🔨	0	0	0	2	0	0	0	4	6

Team	1	2	3	4	5	6	7	8	Final
(Ontario) Tracy Horgan	0	2	0	3	0	0	0	1	6
(Russia) Victorya Moiseeva 🔨	2	0	1	0	0	0	1	0	4

Team	1	2	3	4	5	6	7	8	Final
(British Columbia) Kelly Scott	1	1	0	0	X	X	X	X	2
(Alberta) Kristie Moore	0	0	0	0	X	X	X	X	0

Team	1	2	3	4	5	6	7	8	Final
(Saskatchewan) Stefanie Lawton 🔨	0	1	0	2	0	3	0	1	7
(Saskatchewan) Kara Kilden	0	0	2	0	1	0	2	0	5

=== Draw 4 ===
Friday, November 9, 12:30 pm

Team	1	2	3	4	5	6	7	8	Final
(Manitoba) Kerri Einarson 🔨	0	2	1	0	0	1	1	0	5
(Saskatchewan) Jill Shumay	2	0	0	1	1	0	0	3	7

Team	1	2	3	4	5	6	7	8	Final
(Ontario) Cathy Auld 🔨	3	0	2	0	1	0	0	2	8
(Saskatchewan) Kelly Wood	0	1	0	4	0	2	0	0	7

Team	1	2	3	4	5	6	7	8	Final
(Alberta) Heather Nedohin	0	1	0	2	0	0	X	X	3
(Saskatchewan) Deanna Doig 🔨	1	0	4	0	0	3	X	X	8

Team	1	2	3	4	5	6	7	8	Final
(United States) Alexandra Carlson 🔨	0	1	0	0	0	1	0	X	2
(Alberta) Jessie Kaufman	1	0	2	1	2	0	2	X	8

Friday, November 9, 1:30 pm

Team	1	2	3	4	5	6	7	8	Final
(Saskatchewan) Candace Chisholm 🔨	2	0	0	2	1	0	1	0	6
(Wisconsin) Erika Brown	0	0	3	0	0	2	0	2	7

Team	1	2	3	4	5	6	7	8	Final
(Alberta) Lisa Eyamie 🔨	3	0	1	0	2	X	X	X	6
(Alberta) Leslie Rogers	0	1	0	2	0	X	X	X	3

Team	1	2	3	4	5	6	7	8	Final
(Nova Scotia) Sarah Rhyno	1	0	0	1	0	1	0	0	3
(Alberta) Valerie Sweeting 🔨	0	1	3	0	0	0	1	1	6

Team	1	2	3	4	5	6	7	8	Final
(Saskatchewan) Penny Barker	0	0	2	0	0	1	0	X	3
(Switzerland) Manuela Siegrist 🔨	0	1	0	1	2	0	2	X	6

=== Draw 5 ===
Friday, November 9, 3:30 pm

Team	1	2	3	4	5	6	7	8	Final
(Saskatchewan) Ros Stewart 🔨	1	1	0	0	2	1	1	X	6
(Saskatchewan) Michelle Englot	0	0	1	1	0	0	0	X	2

Team	1	2	3	4	5	6	7	8	9	Final
(Saskatchewan) Trish Paulsen	0	1	0	1	0	0	1	1	0	4
(Russia) Anna Sidorova 🔨	0	0	2	0	1	1	0	0	1	5

Team	1	2	3	4	5	6	7	8	Final
(Alberta) Crystal Webster 🔨	1	0	3	0	3	0	X	X	7
(Alberta) Shannon Kleibrink	0	1	0	1	0	2	X	X	4

Team	1	2	3	4	5	6	7	8	Final
(United States) Allison Pottinger 🔨	2	0	0	2	0	2	1	1	8
(Switzerland) Mirjam Ott	0	3	0	0	2	0	0	0	5

Friday, November 9, 4:30 pm

Team	1	2	3	4	5	6	7	8	Final
(Manitoba) Cathy Overton-Clapham	0	1	0	1	0	0	0	0	2
(Saskatchewan) Chantelle Eberle 🔨	1	0	1	0	1	0	0	1	4

Team	1	2	3	4	5	6	7	8	Final
(Manitoba) Chelsea Carey 🔨	0	1	0	1	0	2	0	1	5
(Ontario) Rachel Homan	0	0	1	0	1	0	1	0	3

Team	1	2	3	4	5	6	7	8	Final
(Alberta) Cheryl Bernard 🔨	0	2	2	1	1	0	X	X	6
(Saskatchewan) Amber Holland	0	0	0	0	0	2	X	X	2

Team	1	2	3	4	5	6	7	8	9	Final
(Switzerland) Michèle Jäggi 🔨	0	1	1	0	1	0	0	1	1	5
(Scotland) Eve Muirhead	0	0	0	1	0	2	1	0	0	4

=== Draw 6 ===
Friday, November 9, 6:00 pm

Team	1	2	3	4	5	6	7	8	Final
(Saskatchewan) Rachel Fritzler	0	3	3	X	X	X	X	X	6
(Saskatchewan) Deanne Miller-Jones 🔨	1	0	0	X	X	X	X	X	1

Team	1	2	3	4	5	6	7	8	Final
(Alberta) Tanilla Doyle 🔨	0	3	0	0	2	0	1	0	6
(Manitoba) Darcy Robertson	0	0	2	1	0	2	0	2	7

Team	1	2	3	4	5	6	7	8	Final
(Saskatchewan) Larissa Murray	0	2	0	1	1	0	2	1	7
(Russia) Victorya Moiseeva 🔨	1	0	2	0	0	1	0	0	4

Team	1	2	3	4	5	6	7	8	Final
(Alberta) Kristie Moore	0	0	2	0	3	0	2	X	7
(Saskatchewan) Kara Kilden 🔨	0	1	0	2	0	1	0	X	4

Friday, November 9, 7:00 pm

Team	1	2	3	4	5	6	7	8	Final
(Manitoba) Kaitlyn Lawes	0	0	0	0	0	2	X	X	2
(Alberta) Laura Crocker 🔨	2	0	1	0	3	0	X	X	6

Team	1	2	3	4	5	6	7	8	Final
(Switzerland) Silvana Tirinzoni	0	0	1	2	0	2	0	0	5
(Alberta) Amy Nixon	2	1	0	0	1	0	1	1	6

Team	1	2	3	4	5	6	7	8	Final
(Alberta) Renée Sonnenberg	1	0	1	0	2	1	1	0	6
(Ontario) Tracy Horgan	0	3	0	3	0	0	0	1	7

Team	1	2	3	4	5	6	7	8	Final
(British Columbia) Kelly Scott	1	0	1	0	2	0	1	X	5
(Saskatchewan) Stefanie Lawton	0	1	0	3	0	3	0	X	7

=== Draw 7 ===
Friday, November 9, 8:30 pm

Team	1	2	3	4	5	6	7	8	Final
(Manitoba) Cathy Overton-Clapham	0	2	1	0	3	0	1	X	7
(Wisconsin) Erika Brown	2	0	0	1	0	2	0	X	5

Team	1	2	3	4	5	6	7	8	Final
(Ontario) Rachel Homan	1	1	0	1	0	1	0	1	5
(Alberta) Lisa Eyamie	0	0	2	0	0	0	1	0	3

Team	1	2	3	4	5	6	7	8	Final
(Saskatchewan) Amber Holland	2	1	0	1	0	0	0	2	6
(Alberta) Valerie Sweeting	0	0	1	0	2	1	1	0	5

Team	1	2	3	4	5	6	7	8	Final
(Scotland) Eve Muirhead	3	0	5	X	X	X	X	X	8
(Switzerland) Manuela Siegrist	0	1	0	X	X	X	X	X	1

Friday, November 9, 9:30 pm

Team	1	2	3	4	5	6	7	8	Final
(Saskatchewan) Michelle Englot	2	0	2	1	0	4	X	X	9
(Saskatchewan) Jill Shumay	0	1	0	0	1	0	X	X	2

Team	1	2	3	4	5	6	7	8	Final
(Saskatchewan) Trish Paulsen	0	1	0	1	0	0	X	X	2
(Ontario) Cathy Auld	3	0	2	0	1	1	X	X	7

Team	1	2	3	4	5	6	7	8	Final
(Alberta) Shannon Kleibrink 🔨	2	0	0	2	0	0	0	1	5
(Saskatchewan) Deanna Doig	0	1	0	0	0	2	0	0	3

Team	1	2	3	4	5	6	7	8	9	Final
(Switzerland) Mirjam Ott	1	0	1	0	5	0	1	0	1	9
(Alberta) Jessie Kaufman	0	1	0	2	0	4	0	1	0	8

=== Draw 8 ===
Saturday, November 10, 9:00 am

Team	1	2	3	4	5	6	7	8	Final
(Alberta) Renée Sonnenberg 🔨	2	2	1	0	2	0	0	3	10
(Saskatchewan) Rachel Fritzler	0	0	0	1	0	3	3	0	7

Team	1	2	3	4	5	6	7	8	9	Final
(British Columbia) Kelly Scott	0	0	3	1	0	0	2	0	0	6
(Manitoba) Darcy Robertson 🔨	0	1	0	0	1	1	0	3	1	7

Team	1	2	3	4	5	6	7	8	Final
(Manitoba) Kaitlyn Lawes 🔨	0	2	0	0	2	0	2	2	8
(Saskatchewan) Larissa Murray	1	0	1	1	0	3	0	0	6

Team	1	2	3	4	5	6	7	8	Final
(Switzerland) Silvana Tirinzoni	0	1	1	0	3	0	0	X	5
(Alberta) Kristie Moore 🔨	0	0	0	1	0	0	1	X	2

Saturday, November 10, 10:00 am

Team	1	2	3	4	5	6	7	8	9	Final
(Saskatchewan) Ros Stewart 🔨	0	0	0	2	1	0	1	0	0	4
(Russia) Anna Sidorova	0	1	0	0	0	2	0	1	2	6

Team	1	2	3	4	5	6	7	8	Final
(Alberta) Crystal Webster	0	1	0	3	0	0	1	0	5
(United States) Allison Pottinger 🔨	1	0	2	0	1	1	0	2	7

Team	1	2	3	4	5	6	7	8	Final
(Saskatchewan) Chantelle Eberle	0	1	1	0	1	0	0	X	3
(Manitoba) Chelsea Carey 🔨	2	0	0	1	0	2	1	X	6

Team	1	2	3	4	5	6	7	8	Final
(Alberta) Cheryl Bernard	0	0	0	0	X	X	X	X	0
(Switzerland) Michèle Jäggi 🔨	2	1	2	4	X	X	X	X	9

=== Draw 9 ===
Saturday, November 10, 11:30 am

Team	1	2	3	4	5	6	7	8	Final
(Alberta) Laura Crocker 🔨	3	0	0	0	0	2	1	X	6
(Alberta) Amy Nixon	0	0	0	2	2	0	0	X	4

Team	1	2	3	4	5	6	7	8	Final
(Ontario) Tracy Horgan	0	1	0	1	0	0	1	X	3
(Saskatchewan) Stefanie Lawton	1	0	2	0	1	1	0	X	5

Saturday, November 10, 12:30 pm

Team	1	2	3	4	5	6	7	8	9	Final
(Alberta) Shannon Kleibrink	0	1	0	0	2	0	2	0	1	6
(Alberta) Cheryl Bernard	0	0	2	1	0	1	0	1	0	5

Team	1	2	3	4	5	6	7	8	9	Final
(Switzerland) Mirjam Ott	2	0	1	0	0	0	2	0	0	5
(Saskatchewan) Chantelle Eberle	0	2	0	0	2	0	0	1	1	6

Team	1	2	3	4	5	6	7	8	9	Final
(Scotland) Eve Muirhead 🔨	0	1	0	2	0	2	0	0	1	6
(Saskatchewan) Ros Stewart	0	0	2	0	2	0	0	1	0	5

Team	1	2	3	4	5	6	7	8	Final
(Alberta) Heather Nedohin	1	0	0	2	0	0	1	2	6
(United States) Alexandra Carlson	0	1	0	0	1	2	0	0	4

=== Draw 10 ===
Saturday, November 10, 2:00 pm

Team	1	2	3	4	5	6	7	8	Final
(Saskatchewan) Amber Holland 🔨	1	0	2	0	0	1	0	1	5
(Ontario) Tracy Horgan	0	1	0	1	0	0	1	0	3

Team	1	2	3	4	5	6	7	8	9	Final
(Manitoba) Kerri Einarson	0	0	2	0	1	1	0	1	0	5
(Saskatchewan) Kelly Wood 🔨	1	0	0	2	0	0	2	0	1	6

Team	1	2	3	4	5	6	7	8	Final
(Nova Scotia) Sarah Rhyno 🔨	1	1	2	0	2	X	X	X	6
(Saskatchewan) Penny Barker	0	0	0	2	0	X	X	X	2

Team	1	2	3	4	5	6	7	8	Final
(Saskatchewan) Candace Chisholm 🔨	0	2	0	3	1	0	X	X	6
(Alberta) Leslie Rogers	0	0	1	0	0	2	X	X	3

Saturday, November 10, 3:00 pm

Team	1	2	3	4	5	6	7	8	Final
(Saskatchewan) Michelle Englot	0	2	0	1	1	0	0	X	4
(Ontario) Cathy Auld 🔨	3	0	2	0	0	2	1	X	8

Team	1	2	3	4	5	6	7	8	Final
(Manitoba) Cathy Overton-Clapham	0	0	0	2	0	1	1	0	4
(Ontario) Rachel Homan 🔨	0	1	1	0	2	0	0	1	5

Team	1	2	3	4	5	6	7	8	Final
(Manitoba) Kaitlyn Lawes	2	0	3	1	0	1	2	X	9
(Switzerland) Silvana Tirinzoni	0	2	0	0	1	0	0	X	3

Team	1	2	3	4	5	6	7	8	9	Final
(Saskatchewan) Deanne Miller-Jones 🔨	0	2	0	0	2	0	0	1	0	5
(Alberta) Tanilla Doyle	1	0	1	0	0	1	2	0	1	6

=== Draw 11 ===
Saturday, November 10, 5:00 pm

Team	1	2	3	4	5	6	7	8	Final
(Russia) Victorya Moiseeva	2	0	1	0	0	1	0	1	5
(Saskatchewan) Kara Kilden	0	1	0	1	0	0	1	0	3

Team	1	2	3	4	5	6	7	8	Final
(Alberta) Valerie Sweeting	0	0	2	0	0	X	X	X	2
(Alberta) Heather Nedohin 🔨	0	3	0	1	3	X	X	X	7

Team	1	2	3	4	5	6	7	8	Final
(Switzerland) Manuela Siegrist 🔨	0	3	0	1	1	0	1	X	6
(Saskatchewan) Kelly Wood	0	0	2	0	0	2	0	X	4

Team	1	2	3	4	5	6	7	8	Final
(Alberta) Lisa Eyamie	1	0	2	0	1	0	3	X	7
(British Columbia) Kelly Scott	0	2	0	1	0	1	0	X	4

Saturday, November 10, 6:00 pm

Team	1	2	3	4	5	6	7	8	Final
(Alberta) Renée Sonnenberg	1	3	0	4	X	X	X	X	8
(Alberta) Amy Nixon	0	0	1	0	X	X	X	X	1

Team	1	2	3	4	5	6	7	8	Final
(Manitoba) Darcy Robertson	0	1	0	0	2	0	1	0	4
(Alberta) Crystal Webster	2	0	1	1	0	1	0	1	6

Team	1	2	3	4	5	6	7	8	Final
(Wisconsin) Erika Brown	2	0	2	0	0	2	0	0	6
(Saskatchewan) Larissa Murray	0	2	0	2	1	0	1	1	7

Team	1	2	3	4	5	6	7	8	Final
(Saskatchewan) Trish Paulsen	0	2	0	0	0	0	0	X	2
(Alberta) Jessie Kaufman	0	0	0	2	0	1	2	X	5

=== Draw 12 ===
Saturday, November 10, 7:30 pm

Team	1	2	3	4	5	6	7	8	Final
(Saskatchewan) Candace Chisholm	2	0	2	1	0	1	0	X	6
(Alberta) Kristie Moore	0	2	0	0	1	0	1	X	4

Team	1	2	3	4	5	6	7	8	Final
(Saskatchewan) Jill Shumay	0	2	0	0	1	1	0	2	6
(Saskatchewan) Deanne Miller-Jones 🔨	1	0	0	0	0	0	2	0	3

Saturday, November 10, 8:30 pm

Team	1	2	3	4	5	6	7	8	Final
(Russia) Anna Sidorova	0	2	0	1	0	2	0	1	6
(United States) Allison Pottinger 🔨	2	0	1	0	1	0	1	0	5

Team	1	2	3	4	5	6	7	8	Final
(Manitoba) Chelsea Carey	0	0	2	0	0	2	1	X	5
(Switzerland) Michèle Jäggi	0	0	0	1	0	0	0	X	1

Team	1	2	3	4	5	6	7	8	Final
(Alberta) Laura Crocker 🔨	1	0	0	1	0	1	0	X	3
(Saskatchewan) Stefanie Lawton	0	1	1	0	3	0	1	X	6

Team	1	2	3	4	5	6	7	8	Final
(Alberta) Shannon Kleibrink 🔨	0	1	1	1	0	2	0	1	6
(Saskatchewan) Chantelle Eberle	2	0	0	0	1	0	2	0	5

Team	1	2	3	4	5	6	7	8	Final
(Saskatchewan) Rachel Fritzler 🔨	1	0	1	0	2	1	3	X	8
(Nova Scotia) Sarah Rhyno	0	3	0	3	0	0	0	X	6

Team	1	2	3	4	5	6	7	8	Final
(Saskatchewan) Deanna Doig 🔨	1	0	0	0	2	0	X	X	3
(Russia) Victorya Moiseeva	0	0	2	1	0	2	X	X	5

=== Draw 13 ===
Sunday, November 11, 10:00 am

Team	1	2	3	4	5	6	7	8	9	Final
(Ontario) Cathy Auld 🔨	0	1	0	0	2	0	0	1	0	4
(Alberta) Laura Crocker	2	0	0	1	0	1	0	0	1	5

Team	1	2	3	4	5	6	7	8	Final
(Saskatchewan) Amber Holland	0	0	2	0	3	0	0	0	5
(Scotland) Eve Muirhead 🔨	2	0	0	1	0	2	1	1	7

Team	1	2	3	4	5	6	7	8	Final
(Ontario) Rachel Homan	0	2	0	0	1	1	2	X	6
(United States) Allison Pottinger 🔨	1	0	0	1	0	0	0	X	2

Team	1	2	3	4	5	6	7	8	Final
(Alberta) Renée Sonnenberg	0	1	0	2	0	1	0	X	4
(Alberta) Crystal Webster 🔨	2	0	1	0	2	0	1	X	6

Team	1	2	3	4	5	6	7	8	Final
(Manitoba) Kaitlyn Lawes 🔨	0	0	2	0	2	3	0	X	7
(Switzerland) Michèle Jäggi	0	2	0	1	0	0	1	X	4

Team	1	2	3	4	5	6	7	8	Final
(Switzerland) Mirjam Ott 🔨	0	4	0	3	2	X	X	X	9
(Saskatchewan) Larissa Murray	1	0	1	0	0	X	X	X	2

Team	1	2	3	4	5	6	7	8	Final
(Manitoba) Darcy Robertson	1	0	1	0	1	0	1	X	4
(Alberta) Heather Nedohin 🔨	0	1	0	2	0	2	0	X	5

Team	1	2	3	4	5	6	7	8	Final
(Alberta) Cheryl Bernard	0	2	1	0	0	0	2	0	5
(Switzerland) Manuela Siegrist 🔨	1	0	0	2	0	2	0	1	6

=== Draw 14 ===
Sunday, November 11, 1:00 pm

Team	1	2	3	4	5	6	7	8	Final
(Alberta) Lisa Eyamie	0	1	1	0	0	0	0	X	2
(Switzerland) Silvana Tirinzoni	2	0	0	2	1	1	1	X	7

Team	1	2	3	4	5	6	7	8	Final
(Saskatchewan) Rachel Fritzler	1	1	0	1	0	1	0	1	5
(Ontario) Tracy Horgan	0	0	1	0	2	0	1	0	4

Team	1	2	3	4	5	6	7	8	9	Final
(Saskatchewan) Candace Chisholm	0	1	0	1	0	1	0	2	0	5
(Saskatchewan) Michelle Englot	0	0	2	0	1	0	2	0	1	6

Team	1	2	3	4	5	6	7	8	Final
(Alberta) Jessie Kaufman	0	0	2	1	1	0	2	X	6
(Alberta) Amy Nixon	0	3	0	0	0	1	0	X	4

Team	1	2	3	4	5	6	7	8	9	Final
(Saskatchewan) Jill Shumay	0	0	0	1	0	1	0	1	1	4
(Saskatchewan) Ros Stewart	0	1	0	0	1	0	1	0	0	3

Team	1	2	3	4	5	6	7	8	Final
(Russia) Victorya Moiseeva	0	4	0	0	3	0	1	X	8
(Manitoba) Cathy Overton-Clapham	0	0	1	1	0	2	0	X	4

=== Draw 15 ===
Sunday, November 11, 4:00 pm

Team	1	2	3	4	5	6	7	8	Final
(Switzerland) Mirjam Ott	1	1	2	0	1	2	X	X	7
(Ontario) Cathy Auld 🔨	0	0	0	1	0	0	X	X	1

Team	1	2	3	4	5	6	7	8	Final
(Switzerland) Manuela Siegrist 🔨	0	0	0	1	1	0	1	0	3
(Alberta) Renée Sonnenberg	1	1	1	0	0	1	0	2	6

Team	1	2	3	4	5	6	7	8	Final
(Switzerland) Silvana Tirinzoni	2	0	1	0	1	0	1	0	5
(Saskatchewan) Amber Holland	0	1	0	5	0	1	0	1	8

Team	1	2	3	4	5	6	7	8	Final
(Saskatchewan) Rachel Fritzler 🔨	1	0	0	0	1	0	X	X	2
(United States) Allison Pottinger	0	2	3	1	0	X	X	X	6

Team	1	2	3	4	5	6	7	8	Final
(Saskatchewan) Michelle Englot	0	0	2	0	1	0	0	0	3
(Switzerland) Michèle Jäggi	2	0	0	1	0	0	1	2	6

Team	1	2	3	4	5	6	7	8	Final
(Alberta) Jessie Kaufman 🔨	3	0	1	2	2	0	1	X	9
(Saskatchewan) Jill Shumay	0	2	0	0	0	4	0	X	6

Team	1	2	3	4	5	6	7	8	Final
(Russia) Victorya Moiseeva	0	0	0	2	0	X	X	X	2
(Saskatchewan) Chantelle Eberle 🔨	1	0	2	0	4	X	X	X	7

=== Draw 16 ===
Sunday, November 11, 7:00 pm

Team	1	2	3	4	5	6	7	8	Final
(Switzerland) Mirjam Ott	1	0	0	0	2	0	2	0	5
(Alberta) Heather Nedohin	0	2	1	1	0	3	0	1	8

Team	1	2	3	4	5	6	7	8	Final
(Alberta) Renée Sonnenberg	0	4	0	0	2	0	1	0	7
(Saskatchewan) Amber Holland	2	0	0	3	0	2	0	1	8

Team	1	2	3	4	5	6	7	8	9	Final
(United States) Allison Pottinger	0	2	1	0	2	0	0	1	0	6
(Switzerland) Michèle Jäggi	1	0	0	3	0	0	2	0	1	7

Team	1	2	3	4	5	6	7	8	Final
(Alberta) Jessie Kaufman	1	0	0	0	0	0	X	X	1
(Saskatchewan) Chantelle Eberle	0	4	0	1	1	1	X	X	7

== Playoffs ==
The playoff draw is listed as follows:

Round of 16
(Manitoba) Kaitlyn Lawes	4
(Alberta) Heather Nedohin	6
(Alberta) Shannon Kleibrink	6
(Saskatchewan) Amber Holland	4
(Alberta) Crystal Webster	2
(Switzerland) Michèle Jäggi	5
(Scotland) Eve Muirhead	3
(Saskatchewan) Chantelle Eberle	8
(Alberta) Laura Crocker	3
(Ontario) Rachel Homan	4

Quarterfinals
(Russia) Anna Sidorova	6
(Alberta) Heather Nedohin	5
(Saskatchewan) Stefanie Lawton	5
(Alberta) Shannon Kleibrink	1
(Manitoba) Chelsea Carey	6
(Switzerland) Michèle Jäggi	3
(Saskatchewan) Chantelle Eberle	2
(Ontario) Rachel Homan	8

Semifinals
(Russia) Anna Sidorova	3
(Saskatchewan) Stefanie Lawton	4
(Manitoba) Chelsea Carey	4
(Ontario) Rachel Homan	3

Final
(Saskatchewan) Stefanie Lawton	5
(Manitoba) Chelsea Carey	4

=== Round of 16 ===
Monday, November 12, 9:00 am

Team	1	2	3	4	5	6	7	8	Final
(Manitoba) Kaitlyn Lawes 🔨	1	0	1	0	1	0	1	0	4
(Alberta) Heather Nedohin	0	3	0	1	0	1	0	1	6

Team	1	2	3	4	5	6	7	8	Final
(Alberta) Shannon Kleibrink 🔨	1	0	1	2	0	0	2	X	6
(Saskatchewan) Amber Holland	0	3	0	0	0	1	0	X	4

Team	1	2	3	4	5	6	7	8	Final
(Alberta) Crystal Webster	0	1	0	1	0	0	0	X	2
(Switzerland) Michèle Jäggi 🔨	1	0	1	0	0	1	2	X	5

Team	1	2	3	4	5	6	7	8	Final
(Scotland) Eve Muirhead	1	0	1	1	0	X	X	X	3
(Saskatchewan) Chantelle Eberle 🔨	0	4	0	0	4	X	X	X	8

Team	1	2	3	4	5	6	7	8	9	Final
(Alberta) Laura Crocker	0	1	0	0	1	0	0	1	0	3
(Ontario) Rachel Homan 🔨	0	0	1	0	0	1	1	0	1	4

=== Quarterfinals ===
Monday, November 12, 12:30 pm

Team	1	2	3	4	5	6	7	8	Final
(Russia) Anna Sidorova	0	1	0	0	2	0	1	2	6
(Alberta) Heather Nedohin	0	0	2	1	0	2	0	0	5

Team	1	2	3	4	5	6	7	8	Final
(Saskatchewan) Stefanie Lawton	0	1	1	0	3	0	X	X	5
(Alberta) Shannon Kleibrink	0	0	0	1	0	0	X	X	1

Team	1	2	3	4	5	6	7	8	Final
(Manitoba) Chelsea Carey 🔨	0	2	0	1	0	3	0	X	6
(Switzerland) Michèle Jäggi	1	0	1	0	1	0	0	X	3

Team	1	2	3	4	5	6	7	8	Final
(Saskatchewan) Chantelle Eberle	0	1	0	0	1	0	X	X	2
(Ontario) Rachel Homan 🔨	2	0	2	2	0	2	X	X	8

=== Semifinals ===
Monday, November 12, 4:00 pm

Team	1	2	3	4	5	6	7	8	Final
(Russia) Anna Sidorova	0	0	1	1	0	0	1	0	3
(Saskatchewan) Stefanie Lawton	0	0	0	0	2	1	0	1	4

Team	1	2	3	4	5	6	7	8	Final
(Manitoba) Chelsea Carey	0	0	1	0	1	1	0	1	4
(Ontario) Rachel Homan	0	1	0	1	0	0	1	0	3

=== Final ===
Monday, November 12, 7:30 pm

Team	1	2	3	4	5	6	7	8	Final
(Saskatchewan) Stefanie Lawton 🔨	1	0	0	1	1	0	1	1	5
(Manitoba) Chelsea Carey	0	0	2	0	0	2	0	0	4
