= 2017 King Cash Spiel (September) =

World Curling Tour event

- Host city: Maple Ridge, British Columbia
- Arena: Golden Ears Winter Club
- Dates: September 14–18
- Men's winner: (British Columbia) Sean Geall
- Curling club: Kelowna Curling Club
- Skip: Sean Geall
- Third: Jeff Richard
- Second: Andrew Nerpin
- Lead: David Harper
- Finalist: (British Columbia) Dean Joanisse
- Women's winner: (British Columbia) Sarah Wark
- Curling club: Chilliwack Curling Club
- Skip: Sarah Wark
- Third: Kristen Pilote
- Second: Stephanie Prinse
- Lead: Michelle Dunn
- Finalist: (British Columbia) Kesa Van Osch

The 2017 September King Cash Spiel was held from September 14 to 17 at the Golden Ears Winter Club in Maple Ridge, British Columbia as part of the 2017–18 World Curling Tour. Both the men's and women's events were held in a round robin format, and the purses for the men's event was $12,000 and women's event was CAD $8,000

== Men ==
=== Teams ===
The teams are listed as follows:

Skip	Third	Second	Lead	Locale
Chris Baier	Adam Ceske	Matt Toley	Cal Jackson	Victoria, British Columbia
Miles Craig	Cameron de Jong	Alex Horvath	Wes Craig	Victoria, British Columbia
Bob LeClair	Greg Gallagher	Jeff Baird	Tom Dinelson	(United States) Tempe, Arizona
Stephen Schneider	Will House	Shawn Eklund	Brent Amos	Vancouver, British Columbia
Kelly McQiqigan (fourth)	Cody Tanaka (skip)	Travis Cameron	Zachary Umbach	Richmond, British Columbia
Dean Joanisse	Paul Ceske	Jay Wakefield	John Cullen	Maple Ridge, British Columbia
Jason Peckham	Evan Brannter	Kyle Duncan	David McDonald	Abbotsford, British Columbia
Brent Pierce	Andrew Bilesky	Steve Kopt	Rhys Garmache	New Westminster, British Columbia
Jeff Guingard	Daniel Weskak	Chris Faa	Nicolas Miester	Vancouver, British Columbia
Sean Geall	Jeff Richard	Andrew Nerping	David Harper	Kelowna, British Columbia
Randie Shen	Nicolas Hsu	Brendon Liu	Curtis Bogren	Taipei, Chinese Taipei
Glen Jackson	Andrew Komolodi	Corey Chester	Joel Cave	Victoria, British Columbia
Tyler Tardi	Sterling Middleton	Jordan Tardi	Zac Curtis	Langley, British Columbia
Jessi Wilkensen (Fourth)	Thomas Usselman (Skip)	Neal Wolochuck	Tyler Phifer	Edmonton, Alberta

=== Round Robin Standings ===
Final Round Robin Standings

Key
Teams to Playoffs

Teams	W	L
(British Columbia) Sean Geall	4	0
(British Columbia) Dean Joanisse	4	0
(British Columbia) Miles Craig	4	0
(British Columbia) Jeff Guignard	3	1
(British Columbia) Brent Pierce	3	1
(British Columbia) Tyler Tardi	2	2
(British Columbia) Chris Baier	2	2
(Alberta) Thomas Usselman	2	2
(British Columbia) Kelly McQuiggan	1	3
(British Columbia) Jason Peckham	1	3
(British Columbia) Stephen Schneider	1	3
(Chinese Taipei) Randie Shen	1	3
(United States) Bob LeClair	0	4
(British Columbia) Glen Jackson	0	4

=== Tie Breakers ===
- (British Columbia) Baier 5-1 (Alberta) Usselman
- (British Columbia) Tardi 7-1 (British Columbia) Baier

=== Playoffs ===
Quarterfinals
(British Columbia) Jeff Guignard	4
(British Columbia) Brent Pierce	8
(British Columbia) Miles Craig	5
(British Columbia) Tyler Tardi	6

Semifinals
(British Columbia) Dean Joanisse	6
(British Columbia) Brent Pierce	1
(British Columbia) Sean Geall	8
(British Columbia) Tyler Tardi	7

Final
(British Columbia) Dean Joanisse	5
(British Columbia) Sean Geall	6

== Women ==
=== Teams ===
The teams are listed as follows:

Skip	Third	Second	Lead	Locale
Corryn Brown	Erin Pincott	Dezaray Hawes	Samantha Fisher	Kamloops, British Columbia
Sarah Daniels	Kayla MacMillan	Megan Daniels	Sarah Loken	Delta, British Columbia
Holly Donaldson	Lindsay Hudyma	Steph Jackson-Baier	Carley Sandwith	Victoria, British Columbia
Diane Gushulak	Grace MacInnes	Jessie Sanderson	Sandra Comadina	New Westminster, British Columbia
Kayte Gyles	Shawna Jensen	Caitlin Campbell	Amanda Tipper	Cloverdale, British Columbia
Dailene Pewarchuk	Rachelle Kallechy	Adina Tasaka	Patty Wallingham	Victoria, British Columbia
Mandy Selzer	Erin Barnhart	Sherry Just	Donda-Lee Deis	Balgonie, Saskatchewan
Kelly Shimizu	Rebecca Stevenson	Michelle McLeod	Mariah Coulombe	Richmond, British Columbia
Karla Thompson	Kristen Recksiedler	Shannon Aleksic	Trysta Vandale	Kamloops, British Columbia
Kesa Van Osch	Marika Van Osch	Kalia Van Osch	Amy Gibson	Victoria, British Columbia
Sarah Wark	Kristen Pilote	Stephanie Prinse	Michelle Dunn	Chilliwack, British Columbia

=== Round Robin Standings ===
Final Round Robin Standings

Key
Teams to Playoffs

Pool	W	L
(British Columbia) Diane Gushulak	4	0
(British Columbia) Kesa Van Osch	3	1
(British Columbia) Sarah Wark	3	1
(British Columbia) Corryn Brown	3	1
(British Columbia) Sarah Daniels	2	2
(British Columbia) Kayte Gyles	2	2
(British Columbia) Karla Thompson	2	2
(Saskatchewan) Mandy Selzer	1	3
(British Columbia) Holly Donaldson	1	3
(British Columbia) Kelly Shimizu	1	3
(British Columbia) Dailene Pewarchuk	0	4

=== Playoffs ===
Semifinals		Final
(British Columbia) Diane Gushulak	5
(British Columbia) Sarah Wark	6	(British Columbia) Sarah Wark	5
(British Columbia) Kesa Van Osch	9	(British Columbia) Kesa Van Osch	3
(British Columbia) Corryn Brown	5
