= 2013 Saskatchewan Scotties Tournament of Hearts =

- Host city: Balgonie, Saskatchewan
- Arena: Balgonie Stardome
- Dates: January 23–27
- Winner: Jill Shumay
- Curling club: Maidstone Curling Club, Maidstone
- Skip: Jill Shumay
- Third: Kara Johnston
- Second: Taryn Holtby
- Lead: Jinaye Ayrey
- Finalist: Stefanie Lawton

The 2013 SaskPower Saskatchewan Scotties Tournament of Hearts, Saskatchewan's women's provincial curling championship, was held from January 23 to 27 at the Balgonie Stardome in Balgonie, Saskatchewan. The winning team represented Saskatchewan at the 2013 Scotties Tournament of Hearts in Kingston, Ontario.

== Qualification Process ==
Twelve teams will qualify for the provincial tournament through several methods. The qualification process is as follows:

Qualification method	Berths	Qualifying team(s)
Highest Ranked CTRS Team as of December 17	1	Stefanie Lawton
2nd Highest Ranked CTRS Team as of December 17	1	Amber Holland
3rd Highest Ranked CTRS Team as of December 17	1	Chantelle Eberle
Highest Ranked Saskatchewan Women's Curling Tour Team as of December 17	1	Michelle Englot
Northern Saskatchewan Curling Association Qualifier (Jan 10–13)	4	Trish Paulsen; Nancy Martin; Jill Shumay; Brett Barber
Southern Saskatchewan Curling Association Qualifier (Jan 10–13)	4	Penny Barker; Candace Chisholm; Deanne Miller-Jones; Mandy Selzer

== Teams ==
Skip	Vice	Second	Lead	Club
Brett Barber	Robyn Silvernagle	Dayna Demers	Kailena Bay	Biggar Curling Club, Biggar
Penny Barker	Susan Lang	Melissa Hoffman	Danielle Sicinski	Moose Jaw Curling Centre, Moose Jaw
Candace Chisholm	Cindy Ricci	Natalie Bloomfield	Kristy Johnson	Maryfield Curling Club, Maryfield
Chantelle Eberle	Nancy Inglis	Debbie Lozinski	Susan Hoffart	Callie Curling Club, Regina
Michelle Englot	Lana Vey	Roberta Materi	Sarah Slywka	Highland Curling Club, Regina
Amber Holland	Jolene Campbell	Brooklyn Lemon	Dailene Sivertson	Callie Curling Club, Regina
Stefanie Lawton	Sherry Anderson	Sherri Singler	Marliese Kasner	Granite Curling Club, Saskatoon
Nancy Martin	Kara Kilden	Lindsey Sunderland	Krista White	Nutana Curling Club, Saskatoon
Deanne Miller-Jones	Carla Sawicki	Donna Ell	Carla Anaka	Callie Curling Club, Regina
Trish Paulsen	Kari Kennedy	Sarah Collin	Kari Paulsen	Nutana Curling Club, Saskatoon
Mandy Selzer	Erin Selzer	Kristen Mitchell	Megan Selzer	Balgonie Curling Club, Balgonie
Jill Shumay	Kara Johnston	Taryn Holtby	Jinaye Ayrey	Maidstone Curling Club, Maidstone

== Standings ==
=== Pool A ===
Skip (Club)	W	L	PF	PA
Stefanie Lawton (Granite)	5	0	39	18
Chantelle Eberle (Callie)	4	1	36	22
Candace Chisholm (Maryfield)	2	3	23	26
Mandy Selzer (Balgonie)	2	3	18	28
Penny Barker (Moose Jaw)	2	3	28	26
Deanne Miller-Jones (Callie)	0	5	18	42

=== Pool B ===
Skip (Club)	W	L	PF	PA
Jill Shumay (Maidstone)	5	0	45	21
Amber Holland (Callie)	3	2	37	28
Michelle Englot (Highland)	3	2	30	31
Trish Paulsen (Nutana)	3	2	34	37
Nancy Martin (Nutana)	1	4	28	35
Brett Barber (Biggar)	0	5	24	46

== Results ==
=== Draw 1 ===
January 23, 2:00 PM

- Martin 9-4 Barber
- Selzer 7-6 Miller-Jones

=== Draw 2 ===
January 23, 7:30 PM

- Shumay 9-5 Englot
- Eberle 7-5 Chisholm
- Lawton 8-5 Barker
- Paulsen 8-7 Holland

=== Draw 3 ===
January 24, 2:00 PM

- Eberle 10-4 Miller-Jones
- Selzer 4-1 Barker
- Holland 9-5 Martin
- Shumay 13-5 Barber

=== Draw 4 ===
January 24, 7:30 PM

- Paulsen 9-8 Barber
- Lawton 9-3 Miller-Jones
- Chisholm 8-1 Selzer
- Englot 7-5 Martin

=== Draw 5 ===
January 25, 10:00 AM

- Lawton 8-3 Selzer
- Paulsen 8-7 Martin
- Englot 7-4 Barber
- Chisholm 6-3 Miller-Jones

=== Draw 6 ===
January 25, 2:30 PM

- Englot 7-5 Paulsen
- Shumay 8-5 Holland
- Lawton 7-2 Chisholm
- Eberle 9-3 Barker

=== Draw 7 ===
January 25, 7:00 PM

- Holland 8-3 Barber
- Barker 10-2 Miller-Jones
- Eberle 5-3 Selzer
- Shumay 7-2 Martin

=== Draw 8 ===
January 26, 9:00 AM

- Barker 8-2 Chisholm
- Holland 8-4 Englot
- Shumay 8-4 Paulsen
- Lawton 7-5 Eberle

=== Tie breakers ===
January 26, 1:30 PM

Sheet A	1	2	3	4	5	6	7	8	9	10	Final
Amber Holland	0	0	0	0	0	2	1	0	2	X	5
Trish Paulsen	0	0	1	0	0	0	0	1	0	X	2

January 26, 5:30 PM

Sheet A	1	2	3	4	5	6	7	8	9	10	Final
Amber Holland	2	0	0	2	0	1	0	1	0	X	6
Michelle Englot	0	1	0	0	1	0	0	0	1	X	3

== Playoffs ==
Page playoff system
A1	Stefanie Lawton	5
B1	Jill Shumay	4
A2	Chantelle Eberle	6
B2	Amber Holland	11

Semifinal
B1	Jill Shumay	8
B2	Amber Holland	3

Final
A1	Stefanie Lawton	7
B1	Jill Shumay	8

=== A1 vs. B1 ===
January 26, 7:30 PM

Sheet A	1	2	3	4	5	6	7	8	9	10	Final
Stefanie Lawton	0	0	1	0	0	2	0	1	0	1	5
Jill Shumay	0	1	0	0	1	0	1	0	1	0	4

=== A2 vs. B2 ===
January 26, 7:30 PM

Team	1	2	3	4	5	6	7	8	9	10	Final
Chantelle Eberle	0	2	0	2	0	0	2	0	X	X	6
Amber Holland	1	0	3	0	2	2	0	3	X	X	11

=== Semifinal ===
January 27, 1:00 PM

Sheet A	1	2	3	4	5	6	7	8	9	10	Final
Jill Shumay	0	3	0	0	1	0	2	1	1	X	8
Amber Holland	0	0	2	0	0	1	0	0	0	X	3

=== Final ===
Sunday, January 27, 5:00 pm

Sheet A	1	2	3	4	5	6	7	8	9	10	Final
Stefanie Lawton	1	2	0	1	0	1	1	0	1	0	7
Jill Shumay	0	0	2	0	4	0	0	1	0	1	8

== Qualification rounds ==
=== Northern Qualification ===
The 2013 SaskPower Women's Northern Playdown will take place from January 10 to 13 at the Twin Rivers Curling Club in North Battleford. The format of play shall be an open-entry triple knockout, and four teams will be qualify to the provincial playoffs.

==== Teams ====
Skip	Third	Second	Lead	Locale
Brett Barber	Robyn Silvernagle	Dayna Demers	Kailena Bay	Biggar Curling Club, Biggar
Heather Burnett	Melissa Surkan	Samantha Yachiw	Kaitlyn Bowman	Martensville Curling Club, Martensville
Debbie Folk	Amanda Anderson	Michelle Johnson	Sharla Kruger	Nutana Curling Club, Saskatoon
Sherry Just	Alyssa Despins	Sharlene Clarke	Jenna Harrison	Nutana Curling Club, Saskatoon
Trish Paulsen	Kari Kennedy	Sarah Collin	Kari Paulsen	Nutana Curling Club, Saskatoon
Nancy Martin	Kara Kilden	Krista White	Kristen Ridalls	Nutana Curling Club, Saskatoon
Rachel Fritzler	Ashley Quick	Amy Merkowsky	Natalie Yanko	Nutana Curling Club, Saskatoon
Ros Stewart	Patty Hersikorn	Brandee Borne	Andrea Rudulier	Nutana Curling Club, Saskatoon
Brenda Goertzen	Julie Vandenameele	Sheila Kavanagh	Charlene Southam	Granite Curling Club, Saskatoon
Amanda Labach	Caitlin Labach	Kristin Ochitwa	Laura Beddome	Granite Curling Club, Saskatoon
Darlene Gillies	Linda Kloschinsky	Wanda Heitt	Tracy Heidt	Unity Curling Club, Unity
Jill Shumay	Kara Johnston	Taryn Holtby	Jinaye Ayrey	Maidstone Curling Club, Maidstone
Tina Hill	Rebecca Venn	Christy Walker	Nicole Beausoleil	Twin Rivers Curling Club, North Battleford
Alana Love	Kristi Frolek	Janelle Eberle	Erin Rogers	Twin Rivers Curling Club, North Battleford

==== Results ====
===== A Event =====
First Knockout
Jill Shumay	14
Alana Love	0
Brenda Goertzen	2
Heather Burnett	8
Debbie Folk	8
Rachel Fritzler
Ros Stewart	5
Tina Hill	4
Nancy Martin	6
Darlene Gillies	10
Brett Barber	7
Amanda Labach	3

Quarterfinals
Jill Shumay	6
Heather Burnett	4
Debbie Folk	1
Trish Paulsen	7
Ros Stewart	9
Darlene Gillies	3
Brett Barber	8
Sherry Just	6

Semifinals
Jill Shumay	6
Trish Paulsen	8
Ros Stewart	8
Brett Barber	4

Qualifier 1
Trish Paulsen	7
Ros Stewart	6

===== B Event =====
Second Knockout
Alana Love	2
Brenda Goertzen	10
Rachel Fritzler	8
Amanda Labach	7

Quarterfinals
Debbie Folk	8
Brenda Goertzen	10
Darlene Gillies	7
Rachel Fritzler	2

Semifinals
Brett Barber	7
Brenda Goertzen	3
Darlene Gillies	3
Jill Shumay	9

To Qualifier 2
Brett Barber	8
Jill Shumay	5
Qualifier 2
Brett Barber	4
Nancy Martin	6

Second Knockout		Quarterfinals		Semifinals		To Qualifier 2
				Heather Burnett	3
Nancy Martin	8			Nancy Martin	9
Tina Hill	4	Nancy Martin	10
		Sherry Just	4
						Nancy Martin	6
						Ros Stewart	5

===== C Event =====
Third Knockout
Debbie Folk	8
Sherry Just	9
Rachel Fritzler	1
Tina Hill	9

Semifinals
Sherry Just	2
Ros Stewart	11
Jill Shumay	11
Tina Hill	3

Qualifier 3
Ros Stewart	2
Jill Shumay	10

Third Knockout
Alana Love	1
Amanda Labach	9

Quarterfinals
Darlene Gillies	6
Amanda Labach	11
Heather Burnett	8
Brenda Goertzen	11

Semifinals
Amanda Labach	8
Brenda Goertzen	11

Qualifier 4
Brett Barber	8
Brenda Goertzen	6

=== Southern Qualification ===
The 2013 SaskPower Women's Southern Playdown will take place from January 10 to 13 at the Melville Curling Club in Melville. The format of play will be an open-entry triple knockout, and four teams will qualify to the provincial playoffs.

==== Teams ====
Skip	Third	Second	Lead	Locale
Teejay Haichert	Kelsey Dutton	Chelsey Peterson	Calli Tracey	Swift Current Curling Club, Swift Current
Deanna Doig	Kim Schneider	Colleen Ackerman	Michelle Mcivor	Kronau Curling Club, Kronau
Sherrilee Orsted	Candace Newkirk	Brittay Rae	Jade Ivan	Estevan Curling Club, Estevan
Laurie Cyca	Gerri Martin	Patti Lopinski	Gail Simpson	Melville Curling Club, Melville
Mandy Selzer	Erin Selzer	Kristen Mitchell	Megan Selzer	Balgonie Curling Club, Balgonie
Lorraine Arguin	Donda Lee Deis	Shelly Urquhart	Aline Kirk	Moose Jaw Ford Curling Club, Moose Jaw
Penny Barker	Susan Lang	Melissa Hoffman	Danielle Sicinski	Moose Jaw Ford Curling Club, Moose Jaw
Jana Tisdale	Crystal Clements	Brandi Clarke	Renee Boyd	Highland Curling Club, Regina
Shalon Fleming	Jill Belof	Marsha Munro	Michelle Dayman	Highland Curling Club, Regina
Larisa Murray	Amanda Craigie	Leah Mihalicz	Nicole Lang	Caledonian Curling Club, Regina
Deanne Miller-Jones	Carla Sawicki	Donna Ell	Carla Anaka	Caledonian Curling Club, Regina
Candace Chisholm	Cindy Ricci	Natalie Bloomfield	Kristy Johnson	Tartan Curling Club, Regina

==== Results ====
===== A Event =====
First Knockout
Shalon Fleming	8
Laurie Cyca	7
Sherrilee Orsted	8
Deanne Miller-Jones	7
Jana Tisdale	6
Lorraine Arguin	3
Penny Barker	9
Teejay Haichert	1

Quarterfinals
Shalon Fleming	4
Candace Chisholm	7
Sherrilee Orsted	7
Deanna Doig	9
Jana Tisdale	2
Mandy Selzer	9
Penny Barker	7
Larisa Murray	2

Semifinals
Candace Chisholm	8
Deanna Doig	7
Mandy Selzer	5
Penny Barker	10

Qualifier 1
Candace Chisholm	8
Penny Barker	10

===== B Event =====
Second Knockout
Laurie Cyca	8
Sherrilee Orsted	9
Lorraine Arguin	9
Larisa Murray	2
Deanne Miller-Jones	12
Shalon Fleming	10
Jana Tisdale	9
Teejay Haichert	5

Quarterfinals
Mandy Selzer	4
Sherrilee Orsted	8
Lorraine Arguin	6
Deanna Doig	8
Deanne Miller-Jones	8
Jana Tisdale	5

Semifinals
Sherrilee Orsted	4
Deanna Doig	11
Deanne Miller-Jones	6
Candace Chisholm	8

Qualifier 2
Deanna Doig	1
Candace Chisholm	8

===== C Event =====
Third Knockout
Teejay Haichert	8
Shalon Fleming	4
Larisa Murray	8
Laurie Cyca	7

Semifinals
Sherrilee Orsted	5
Teejay Haichert	8
Deanne Miller-Jones	8
Larisa Murray	3

Qualifier 3
Teejay Haichert	6
Deanne Miller-Jones	7

Third Knockout		Semifinals		Qualifier 4
				Deanna Doig	4
Lorraine Arguin	5			Mandy Selzer	6
Mandy Selzer	9	Mandy Selzer	7
		Jana Tisdale	3
