= 2014 Saskatchewan Scotties Tournament of Hearts =

2014 Viterra Saskatchewan Scotties Tournament of Hearts
- Host city: Tisdale, Saskatchewan
- Arena: Tisdale Curling Club
- Dates: January 8–12
- Winner: Stefanie Lawton
- Curling club: Nutana CC, Saskatoon
- Skip: Stefanie Lawton
- Third: Sherry Anderson
- Second: Sherri Singler
- Lead: Marliese Kasner
- Finalist: Michelle Englot

The 2014 Saskatchewan Scotties Tournament of Hearts, the provincial women's curling championship for Saskatchewan, was held from January 8 to 12 at the Tisdale Curling Club in Tisdale. The winning team represented Saskatchewan at the 2014 Scotties Tournament of Hearts in Montreal.

== Teams ==
Skip	Third	Second	Lead	Club(s)
Brett Barber	Samantha Yachiw	Meaghan Freichs	Kaitlyn Bowman	Biggar Curling Club, Biggar
Chantelle Eberle	Cindy Ricci	Nancy Inglis	Debbie Lozinski	Callie Curling Club, Regina
Michelle Englot	Candace Chisholm	Roberta Materi	Kristy Johnson	Highland Curling Club, Regina
Teandra Friesen	Kristen Ochitwa	Sheila Head	Sharla Kruger	CN Curling Club, Saskatoon
Teejay Haichert	Janelle Tyler	Kelsey Dutton	Allison McMillan	Swift Current Curling Club, Swift Current
Amber Holland	Jolene Campbell	Dailene Sivertson	Brooklyn Lemon	Callie Curling Club, Regina
Stefanie Lawton	Sherry Anderson	Sherri Singler	Marliese Kasner	Nutana Curling Club, Saskatoon
Trish Paulsen	Kari Kennedy	Kari Paulsen	Sarah Kramer	Nutana Curling Club, Saskatoon
Mandy Selzer	Erin Selzer	Kristen Mitchell	Megan Selzer	Balgonie Curling Club, Balgonie
Jill Shumay	Kara Johnston	Taryn Holtby	Jinaye Ayrey	Maidstone Curling Club, Maidstone
Ros Stewart	Patty Hersikorn	Kailena McDonald	Andrea Rudulier	Nutana Curling Club, Saskatoon
Lana Vey	Alexandra Williamson	Natalie Bloomfield	Ashley Williamson	Callie Curling Club, Regina

== Round-robin standings ==
Final round-robin standings

Key
Teams to Playoffs
Teams to Tiebreakers

Pool A	W	L
Stefanie Lawton (Nutana)	5	0
Jill Shumay (Maidstone)	3	2
Trish Paulsen (Nutana)	3	2
Amber Holland (Callie)	3	2
Ros Stewart (Nutana)	1	4
Teandra Friesen (CN)	0	5

Pool B	W	L
Michelle Englot (Highland)	4	1
Teejay Haichert (Swift Current)	3	2
Chantelle Eberle (Callie)	3	2
Mandy Selzer (Balgonie)	3	2
Brett Barber (Biggar)	1	4
Lana Vey (Callie)	1	4

== Round-robin results ==
=== Draw 1 ===
Wednesday, January 8, 2:00 pm

Sheet 2	1	2	3	4	5	6	7	8	9	10	11	Final
Brett Barber	0	0	1	0	2	0	1	0	0	1	0	5
Teejay Haichert	1	0	0	1	0	2	0	0	1	0	1	6

Sheet 4	1	2	3	4	5	6	7	8	9	10	Final
Ros Stewart	0	0	2	0	1	0	2	0	0	2	7
Teandra Friesen	1	1	0	0	0	2	0	0	2	0	6

=== Draw 2 ===
Wednesday, January 8, 7:30 pm

Sheet 1	1	2	3	4	5	6	7	8	9	10	Final
Stefanie Lawton	0	0	1	0	0	2	0	1	0	1	5
Jill Shumay	0	0	0	1	1	0	0	0	1	0	3

Sheet 2	1	2	3	4	5	6	7	8	9	10	Final
Amber Holland	0	0	2	1	1	0	5	X	X	X	9
Trish Paulsen	1	0	0	0	0	1	0	X	X	X	2

Sheet 3	1	2	3	4	5	6	7	8	9	10	Final
Chantelle Eberle	0	0	0	1	0	0	1	0	0	0	2
Mandy Selzer	0	0	0	0	1	1	0	1	1	1	5

Sheet 4	1	2	3	4	5	6	7	8	9	10	Final
Michelle Englot	1	0	1	0	1	1	0	1	0	0	5
Lana Vey	0	1	0	0	0	0	2	0	0	1	4

=== Draw 3 ===
Thursday, January 9, 9:30 am

Sheet 1	1	2	3	4	5	6	7	8	9	10	Final
Michelle Englot	0	0	0	0	0	2	0	1	0	2	5
Brett Barber	0	0	0	0	1	0	1	0	2	0	4

Sheet 2	1	2	3	4	5	6	7	8	9	10	Final
Jill Shumay	0	2	0	0	0	0	4	0	1	X	7
Teandra Friesen	0	0	0	0	0	1	0	1	0	X	2

Sheet 3	1	2	3	4	5	6	7	8	9	10	Final
Amber Holland	0	2	0	2	0	2	1	1	X	X	8
Ros Stewart	0	0	1	0	2	0	0	0	X	X	3

Sheet 4	1	2	3	4	5	6	7	8	9	10	Final
Mandy Selzer	0	3	0	1	0	0	0	1	0	0	5
Teejay Haichert	2	0	0	0	2	0	1	0	0	2	7

=== Draw 4 ===
Thursday, January 9, 2:00 pm

Sheet 1	1	2	3	4	5	6	7	8	9	10	Final
Chantelle Eberle	0	0	0	3	0	3	0	0	1	0	7
Lana Vey	0	3	0	0	2	0	2	1	0	1	9

Sheet 2	1	2	3	4	5	6	7	8	9	10	Final
Michelle Englot	0	0	0	2	1	2	0	1	0	0	6
Mandy Selzer	0	1	1	0	0	0	2	0	2	2	8

Sheet 3	1	2	3	4	5	6	7	8	9	10	Final
Stefanie Lawton	0	1	0	2	0	2	0	3	1	X	9
Trish Paulsen	1	0	2	0	2	0	1	0	0	X	6

Sheet 4	1	2	3	4	5	6	7	8	9	10	Final
Amber Holland	0	1	1	2	0	0	1	0	0	X	5
Jill Shumay	1	0	0	0	1	0	0	2	3	X	7

=== Draw 5 ===
Thursday, January 9, 7:30 pm

Sheet 1	1	2	3	4	5	6	7	8	9	10	Final
Stefanie Lawton	2	0	0	1	4	0	1	0	X	X	8
Ros Stewart	0	0	2	0	0	1	0	1	X	X	4

Sheet 2	1	2	3	4	5	6	7	8	9	10	Final
Lana Vey	1	0	1	0	2	0	0	0	0	0	4
Teejay Haichert	0	1	0	1	0	0	1	1	0	2	6

Sheet 3	1	2	3	4	5	6	7	8	9	10	Final
Chantelle Eberle	0	0	1	0	0	2	1	3	0	1	8
Brett Barber	1	0	0	2	1	0	0	0	1	0	5

Sheet 4	1	2	3	4	5	6	7	8	9	10	Final
Trish Paulsen	4	1	0	1	3	X	X	X	X	X	9
Teandra Friesen	0	0	1	0	0	X	X	X	X	X	1

=== Draw 6 ===
Friday, January 10, 9:30 am

Sheet 1	1	2	3	4	5	6	7	8	9	10	Final
Amber Holland	0	2	0	0	2	1	1	1	X	X	7
Teandra Friesen	0	0	0	1	0	0	0	0	X	X	1

Sheet 2	1	2	3	4	5	6	7	8	9	10	Final
Jill Shumay	1	0	0	3	0	1	1	0	0	1	7
Ros Stewart	0	2	1	0	1	0	0	1	0	0	6

Sheet 3	1	2	3	4	5	6	7	8	9	10	Final
Michelle Englot	0	2	0	1	0	0	1	0	2	X	6
Teejay Haichert	0	0	2	0	0	1	0	1	0	X	4

Sheet 4	1	2	3	4	5	6	7	8	9	10	Final
Mandy Selzer	0	0	0	0	1	0	0	0	0	X	1
Brett Barber	0	0	1	0	0	2	0	1	1	X	5

=== Draw 7 ===
Friday, January 10, 2:00 pm

Sheet 1	1	2	3	4	5	6	7	8	9	10	Final
Lana Vey	2	1	0	1	0	1	0	1	0	3	9
Brett Barber	0	0	2	0	1	0	1	0	3	0	7

Sheet 2	1	2	3	4	5	6	7	8	9	10	Final
Stefanie Lawton	2	0	0	3	0	2	1	X	X	X	8
Teandra Friesen	0	1	0	0	1	0	0	X	X	X	2

Sheet 3	1	2	3	4	5	6	7	8	9	10	11	Final
Trish Paulsen	2	0	1	0	0	0	0	1	0	2	1	7
Ros Stewart	0	1	0	0	0	1	1	0	3	0	0	6

Sheet 4	1	2	3	4	5	6	7	8	9	10	Final
Chantelle Eberle	0	1	2	2	0	0	2	0	1	X	8
Teejay Haichert	0	0	0	0	2	2	0	1	0	X	5

=== Draw 8 ===
Saturday, January 11, 9:30 am

Sheet 1	1	2	3	4	5	6	7	8	9	10	Final
Trish Paulsen	1	1	0	2	0	0	0	1	0	1	6
Jill Shumay	0	0	2	0	0	0	1	0	2	0	5

Sheet 2	1	2	3	4	5	6	7	8	9	10	Final
Chantelle Eberle	0	0	0	0	0	2	0	1	X	X	3
Michelle Englot	0	2	1	1	1	0	2	0	X	X	7

Sheet 3	1	2	3	4	5	6	7	8	9	10	Final
Lana Vey	0	0	0	1	0	0	0	2	1	0	4
Mandy Selzer	0	1	0	0	1	2	1	0	0	1	6

Sheet 4	1	2	3	4	5	6	7	8	9	10	Final
Stefanie Lawton	0	2	1	0	2	0	1	0	1	1	7
Amber Holland	1	0	0	1	0	1	0	2	0	0	5

== Tiebreakers ==
Semifinals			To Playoffs
			1	Trish Paulsen	9
2	Jill Shumay	6		Amber Holland	6
3	Amber Holland	9

Semifinals			To Playoffs
			1	Chantelle Eberle	6
2	Mandy Selzer	6		Mandy Selzer	7
3	Teejay Haichert	5

=== Round 1 ===
Saturday, January 11, 2:00 pm

Sheet 3	1	2	3	4	5	6	7	8	9	10	Final
Jill Shumay	0	1	1	1	0	1	0	2	0	0	6
Amber Holland	3	0	0	0	2	0	1	0	2	1	9

Sheet 4	1	2	3	4	5	6	7	8	9	10	Final
Mandy Selzer	0	0	1	0	1	1	1	0	1	1	6
Teejay Haichert	0	2	0	2	0	0	0	1	0	0	5

=== Round 2 ===
Saturday, January 11, 7:30 pm

Sheet 3	1	2	3	4	5	6	7	8	9	10	Final
Chantelle Eberle	0	0	0	2	0	2	0	0	2	0	6
Mandy Selzer	0	0	2	0	1	0	1	2	0	1	7

Sheet 4	1	2	3	4	5	6	7	8	9	10	Final
Trish Paulsen	0	0	3	0	1	0	0	2	0	3	9
Amber Holland	1	0	0	3	0	1	0	0	1	0	6

== Playoffs ==
Page playoff system
A1	Stefanie Lawton	6
B1	Michelle Englot	5
A2	Trish Paulsen	5
B2	Mandy Selzer	3

Semifinal
B1	Michelle Englot	6
A2	Trish Paulsen	3

Final
A1	Stefanie Lawton	5
B1	Michelle Englot	2

=== A1 vs. B1 ===
Sunday, January 12, 9:00 am

Sheet 3	1	2	3	4	5	6	7	8	9	10	Final
Stefanie Lawton	2	0	0	1	1	0	0	1	0	1	6
Michelle Englot	0	2	1	0	0	1	1	0	0	0	5

=== A2 vs. B2 ===
Sunday, January 12, 9:00 am

Sheet 2	1	2	3	4	5	6	7	8	9	10	Final
Trish Paulsen	2	0	2	0	0	0	0	0	1	X	5
Mandy Selzer	0	0	0	1	0	0	2	0	0	X	3

=== Semifinal ===
Sunday, January 12, 1:00 pm

Team	1	2	3	4	5	6	7	8	9	10	Final
Michelle Englot	0	0	0	1	0	1	1	0	3	X	6
Trish Paulsen	0	0	1	0	1	0	0	1	0	X	3

=== Final ===
Sunday, January 12, 5:00 pm

Team	1	2	3	4	5	6	7	8	9	10	Final
Stefanie Lawton	2	0	0	0	0	1	1	0	1	X	5
Michelle Englot	0	0	0	0	1	0	0	1	0	X	2

2014 Saskatchewan Scotties Tournament of Hearts

Stefanie Lawton
3rd Saskatchewan Provincial Championship title
