= 2019 Saskatchewan Scotties Tournament of Hearts =

2019 Viterra Saskatchewan Scotties Tournament of Hearts
- Host city: Humboldt, Saskatchewan
- Arena: Humboldt Curling Club
- Dates: January 22–27
- Winner: Team Silvernagle
- Curling club: Twin Rivers Curling Club, North Battleford
- Skip: Robyn Silvernagle
- Third: Stefanie Lawton
- Second: Jessie Hunkin
- Lead: Kara Thevenot
- Coach: Lesley McEwan
- Finalist: Sherry Anderson

The 2019 Viterra Saskatchewan Scotties Tournament of Hearts, the provincial women's curling championship for Saskatchewan, was held January from 22–27 at the Humboldt Curling Club in Humboldt. The winning Robyn Silvernagle team represented Saskatchewan at the 2019 Scotties Tournament of Hearts in Sydney, Nova Scotia.

== Qualification ==
Qualification method	Berths	Qualifying team(s)
CTRS leaders	3	Robyn Silvernagle; Kristen Streifel; Sherry Anderson
Saskatchewan Tour	2	Jessica Mitchell; Penny Barker
Challenge	2	Sherry Just; Chantelle Eberle
Last Chance	2	Amber Holland; Ashley Howard

== Teams ==
The teams are listed as follows:

Skip	Third	Second	Lead	Club(s)
Sherry Anderson	Nancy Martin	Meaghan Frerichs	Alyssa Jenkins	Nutana
Penny Barker	Deanna Doig	Christie Gamble	Danielle Sicinski	Moose Jaw Ford
Chantelle Eberle	Chaelynn Kitz	Jana Tisdale	Haylee Jameson	Highland
Amber Holland	Cindy Ricci	Laura Strong	Deb Lozinski	Callie
Ashley Howard	Carly Howard	Kaitlin Corbin	Ashley Williamson	Highland
Sherry Just	Megan Anderson	Ellen Redlick	Hanna Andersson	Nutana
Danielle Waterfield (Note: Danielle Waterfield is listed as the skip for Team Jessica Mitchell.)	Teresa Waterfield	Layne Engel	Rikki Schik	Nutana
Robyn Silvernagle	Stefanie Lawton	Jessie Hunkin	Kara Thevenot	Twin Rivers
Kristen Streifel	Jolene Campbell	Callan Hamon	Breanne Knapp	Highland

== Round robin standings ==
Key
Teams to playoffs

	W	L
Robyn Silvernagle	7	1
Sherry Anderson	6	2
Amber Holland	5	3
Kristen Streifel	5	3
Penny Barker	4	4
Sherry Just	4	4
Chantelle Eberle	3	5
Ashley Howard	2	6
Team Mitchell	0	8

== Round robin results ==
All draw times are listed in Central Standard Time (UTC-06:00)

=== Draw 1 ===
Tuesday, January 22, 16:00

Sheet 1	1	2	3	4	5	6	7	8	9	10	Final
Sherry Anderson	1	1	1	0	2	0	0	0	2	1	8
Kristen Streifel	0	0	0	2	0	2	1	1	0	0	6

Sheet 2	1	2	3	4	5	6	7	8	9	10	Final
Team Mitchell	0	0	0	0	0	1	0	X	X	X	1
Robyn Silvernagle	0	2	1	0	3	0	4	X	X	X	10

Sheet 3	1	2	3	4	5	6	7	8	9	10	11	Final
Amber Holland	0	0	0	2	1	0	0	3	0	1	0	7
Sherry Just	1	0	0	0	0	2	2	0	2	0	2	9

Sheet 4	1	2	3	4	5	6	7	8	9	10	11	Final
Chantelle Eberle	0	2	0	2	0	2	0	0	1	2	0	9
Penny Barker	1	0	1	0	2	0	2	3	0	0	1	10

=== Draw 2 ===
Tuesday, January 22, 21:30

Sheet 1	1	2	3	4	5	6	7	8	9	10	Final
Sherry Just	0	1	2	0	4	0	3	0	X	X	10
Team Mitchell	2	0	0	2	0	1	0	1	X	X	6

Sheet 2	1	2	3	4	5	6	7	8	9	10	Final
Amber Holland	0	0	1	0	1	0	0	2	0	1	5
Chantelle Eberle	0	0	0	1	0	1	1	0	0	0	3

Sheet 3	1	2	3	4	5	6	7	8	9	10	Final
Kristen Streifel	1	1	1	2	3	0	X	X	X	X	8
Ashley Howard	0	0	0	0	0	1	X	X	X	X	1

Sheet 4	1	2	3	4	5	6	7	8	9	10	Final
Sherry Anderson	0	0	1	0	2	0	1	3	0	X	7
Robyn Silvernagle	0	2	0	1	0	4	0	0	2	X	9

=== Draw 3 ===
Wednesday, January 23, 11:30

Sheet 1	1	2	3	4	5	6	7	8	9	10	Final
Amber Holland	3	0	2	0	0	0	0	2	1	X	8
Ashley Howard	0	1	0	1	1	1	0	0	0	X	4

Sheet 2	1	2	3	4	5	6	7	8	9	10	Final
Sherry Anderson	1	0	1	4	0	0	0	1	0	X	7
Penny Barker	0	1	0	0	2	0	1	0	1	X	5

Sheet 3	1	2	3	4	5	6	7	8	9	10	Final
Chantelle Eberle	0	0	3	4	0	3	X	X	X	X	10
Team Mitchell	0	0	0	0	1	0	X	X	X	X	1

Sheet 4	1	2	3	4	5	6	7	8	9	10	Final
Sherry Just	0	0	1	0	3	0	2	0	1	2	9
Kristen Streifel	1	0	0	1	0	1	0	1	0	0	4

=== Draw 4 ===
Wednesday, January 23, 16:30

Sheet 1	1	2	3	4	5	6	7	8	9	10	Final
Sherry Anderson	0	1	0	1	0	0	0	X	X	X	2
Chantelle Eberle	0	0	2	0	3	2	1	X	X	X	8

Sheet 2	1	2	3	4	5	6	7	8	9	10	Final
Ashley Howard	0	1	0	2	0	2	0	2	0	X	7
Sherry Just	3	0	3	0	1	0	3	0	1	X	11

Sheet 3	1	2	3	4	5	6	7	8	9	10	Final
Penny Barker	0	0	0	0	2	0	1	0	0	1	4
Robyn Silvernagle	0	0	1	1	0	1	0	0	2	0	5

Sheet 4	1	2	3	4	5	6	7	8	9	10	Final
Amber Holland	1	0	1	0	3	0	1	0	3	3	12
Team Mitchell	0	1	0	1	0	1	0	4	0	0	7

=== Draw 5 ===
Wednesday, January 23, 21:30

Sheet 1	1	2	3	4	5	6	7	8	9	10	11	Final
Ashley Howard	1	0	1	0	0	2	0	1	1	0	1	7
Team Mitchell	0	1	0	2	0	0	1	0	0	2	0	6

Sheet 2	1	2	3	4	5	6	7	8	9	10	11	Final
Penny Barker	0	1	1	0	0	0	0	1	0	3	0	6
Amber Holland	0	0	0	2	1	1	1	0	1	0	1	7

Sheet 3	1	2	3	4	5	6	7	8	9	10	Final
Chantelle Eberle	0	0	1	0	0	0	1	X	X	X	2
Kristen Streifel	1	0	0	3	3	1	0	X	X	X	8

Sheet 4	1	2	3	4	5	6	7	8	9	10	Final
Sherry Just	1	0	0	1	0	0	0	1	0	X	3
Robyn Silvernagle	0	0	0	0	2	1	2	0	2	X	7

=== Draw 6 ===
Thursday, January 24, 16:00

Sheet 1	1	2	3	4	5	6	7	8	9	10	Final
Amber Holland	0	2	0	0	0	2	0	2	1	2	9
Robyn Silvernagle	0	0	0	2	1	0	1	0	0	0	4

Sheet 2	1	2	3	4	5	6	7	8	9	10	Final
Team Mitchell	0	0	0	0	0	2	0	0	X	X	2
Kristen Streifel	1	0	0	1	2	0	3	4	X	X	11

Sheet 3	1	2	3	4	5	6	7	8	9	10	Final
Sherry Anderson	0	0	1	0	3	0	0	0	2	0	6
Sherry Just	0	1	0	1	0	2	0	0	0	1	5

Sheet 4	1	2	3	4	5	6	7	8	9	10	Final
Penny Barker	0	1	2	0	2	1	1	0	0	1	8
Ashley Howard	2	0	0	1	0	0	0	2	1	0	6

=== Draw 7 ===
Thursday, January 24, 21:30

Sheet 1	1	2	3	4	5	6	7	8	9	10	Final
Penny Barker	0	1	1	0	2	0	0	3	1	0	8
Kristen Streifel	1	0	0	1	0	3	2	0	0	2	9

Sheet 2	1	2	3	4	5	6	7	8	9	10	Final
Chantelle Eberle	0	0	2	0	0	3	0	1	1	X	7
Sherry Just	1	0	0	2	0	0	1	0	0	X	4

Sheet 3	1	2	3	4	5	6	7	8	9	10	Final
Ashley Howard	0	0	1	0	1	0	0	X	X	X	2
Robyn Silvernagle	0	1	0	2	0	2	3	X	X	X	8

Sheet 4	1	2	3	4	5	6	7	8	9	10	Final
Sherry Anderson	0	1	0	0	3	0	2	2	1	X	9
Team Mitchell	2	0	2	0	0	1	0	0	0	X	5

=== Draw 8 ===
Friday, January 25, 14:30

Sheet 1	1	2	3	4	5	6	7	8	9	10	Final
Chantelle Eberle	0	0	4	1	0	0	1	0	2	0	8
Robyn Silvernagle	0	0	0	0	3	1	0	2	0	3	9

Sheet 2	1	2	3	4	5	6	7	8	9	10	Final
Sherry Anderson	1	0	0	1	1	0	1	1	0	1	6
Ashley Howard	0	0	1	0	0	1	0	0	2	0	4

Sheet 3	1	2	3	4	5	6	7	8	9	10	Final
Penny Barker	1	1	0	1	2	0	1	0	1	1	8
Team Mitchell	0	0	1	0	0	1	0	2	0	0	4

Sheet 4	1	2	3	4	5	6	7	8	9	10	11	Final
Amber Holland	0	0	0	0	1	0	1	1	0	3	0	6
Kristen Streifel	0	0	2	0	0	2	0	0	2	0	1	7

=== Draw 9 ===
Friday, January 25, 20:30

Sheet 1	1	2	3	4	5	6	7	8	9	10	Final
Penny Barker	0	0	2	0	2	1	0	1	0	2	8
Sherry Just	0	1	0	3	0	0	1	0	1	0	6

Sheet 2	1	2	3	4	5	6	7	8	9	10	Final
Robyn Silvernagle	0	1	0	0	0	1	0	2	1	1	6
Kristen Streifel	0	0	1	0	1	0	3	0	0	0	5

Sheet 3	1	2	3	4	5	6	7	8	9	10	Final
Sherry Anderson	0	1	0	0	2	0	0	2	0	1	6
Amber Holland	0	0	0	2	0	0	0	0	1	0	3

Sheet 4	1	2	3	4	5	6	7	8	9	10	Final
Chantelle Eberle	0	0	0	1	0	1	2	1	0	X	5
Ashley Howard	2	2	2	0	1	0	0	0	2	X	9

== Playoffs ==
Page playoff system
1	Robyn Silvernagle	8
2	Sherry Anderson	3
3	Amber Holland	5
4	Kristen Streifel	7

Semifinal
2	Sherry Anderson	9
4	Kristen Streifel	5

Final
1	Robyn Silvernagle	6
2	Sherry Anderson	5

=== 1 vs. 2 ===
Saturday, January 26, 19:00

Sheet 2	1	2	3	4	5	6	7	8	9	10	Final
Robyn Silvernagle	0	2	0	0	2	0	0	3	1	X	8
Sherry Anderson	0	0	2	0	0	0	1	0	0	X	3

=== 3 vs. 4 ===
Saturday, January 26, 14:00

Sheet 2	1	2	3	4	5	6	7	8	9	10	Final
Amber Holland	0	0	1	2	0	0	1	1	0	X	5
Kristen Streifel	1	1	0	0	1	3	0	0	1	X	7

=== Semifinal ===
Sunday, January 27, 12:00

Sheet 2	1	2	3	4	5	6	7	8	9	10	Final
Sherry Anderson	0	1	3	2	0	0	0	0	1	2	9
Kristen Streifel	1	0	0	0	1	2	0	1	0	0	5

=== Final ===
Sunday, January 27, 17:00

Sheet 2	1	2	3	4	5	6	7	8	9	10	Final
Robyn Silvernagle	1	0	2	0	0	0	1	0	1	1	6
Sherry Anderson	0	1	0	2	0	0	0	2	0	0	5

2019 Saskatchewan Scotties Tournament of Hearts

Robyn Silvernagle
1st Saskatchewan Provincial Championship title
