= 2025 Viterra Prairie Pinnacle =

Canadian provincial women's curling championship

2025 Viterra Prairie Pinnacle Women's Provincial Curling Championship
- Host city: Kindersley, Saskatchewan
- Arena: Kindersley West Central Events Centre
- Dates: January 21–26
- Winner: Team Martin
- Curling club: Nutana CC, Saskatoon
- Skip: Nancy Martin
- Third: Chaelynn Stewart
- Second: Kadriana Lott
- Lead: Deanna Doig
- Finalist: Jolene Campbell

The 2025 Viterra Prairie Pinnacle, the provincial women's curling championship for Saskatchewan, was held from January 21 to 26 at the Kindersley West Central Events Centre in Kindersley, Saskatchewan. The winning Nancy Martin rink represented Saskatchewan at the 2025 Scotties Tournament of Hearts in Thunder Bay, Ontario. The event was held in conjunction with the 2025 SaskTel Tankard, the provincial men's championship. This is the first time that both the men's and women's provincial championships have been held in conjunction.

With the reduction of the number of teams from 12 to 9, the round robin portion is now a single round robin instead of two pools of six teams that was used the previous year with the top four teams advancing to the page playoff.

== Qualification process ==
Qualification method	Berths	Qualifying team(s)
CTRS Leaders	3	Michelle Englot; Ashley Thevenot; Penny Barker
SaskCTRS Leaders	3	Amber Holland; Mandy Selzer; Nancy Martin
Last Chance Qualifier	3	Jolene Campbell; Jessica McCartney; Brooklyn Stevenson

== Teams ==
The teams are listed as follows:

Skip	Third	Second	Lead	Alternate	Coach	Club
Penny Barker	Lindsay Bertsch	Taryn Schachtel	Danielle Sicinski		Sherry Anderson	Moose Jaw CC, Moose Jaw
Jolene Campbell	Rachel Erickson	Abby Ackland	Dayna Demmans			Highland CC, Regina
Sara Miller (Note: Team Englot's fourth, Stephanie Schmidt did not make the trip to provincials due to an ongoing case of pneumonia. Third Sara Miller threw fourth stones, second Ashley Williamson threw third stones, while alternate Patty Hersikorn threw second stones.) (Fourth)	Ashley Williamson	Patty Hersikorn	Michelle Englot (Skip)	Stephanie Schmidt		Highland CC, Regina
Amber Holland	Jill Shumay	Sherri Singler	Trenna Derdall	Deb Lozinski	Travis Brown	Sutherland CC, Saskatoon
Nancy Martin	Chaelynn Stewart	Kadriana Lott	Deanna Doig			Nutana CC, Saskatoon
Jessica McCartney	Jenna Hope	Meaghan Frerichs	Michelle Johnson	Amanda Kuzyk	Jim Wilson	Nutana CC, Saskatoon
Mandy Selzer	Erin Barnhart	Megan Selzer	Sarah Slywka		Ken Bakken	Balgonie CC, Balgonie
Brooklyn Stevenson	Larisa Murray	Callan Hamon	Nicole Bender			Highland CC, Regina
Ashley Thevenot	Brittany Tran	Taylor Stremick	Kaylin Skinner		Susan O'Connor	Nutana CC, Saskatoon

== Round robin standings ==
Final Round Robin standings

Key
Teams to Playoffs

Skip	W	L	W–L	PF	PA	EW	EL	BE	SE
Jolene Campbell	7	1	–	67	39	38	26	9	12
Nancy Martin	6	2	–	65	43	34	29	0	9
Penny Barker	5	3	1–0	53	43	36	28	3	16
Ashley Thevenot	5	3	0–1	54	42	35	31	5	11
Michelle Englot	3	5	2–1; 1–0	39	61	27	34	4	7
Mandy Selzer	3	5	2–1; 0–1	52	56	32	38	4	7
Jessica McCartney	3	5	1–2; 1–0	50	64	32	38	6	9
Brooklyn Stevenson	3	5	1–2; 0–1	45	56	29	37	5	8
Amber Holland	1	7	–	46	67	32	34	3	9

== Round robin results ==
All draw times listed in Central Time (UTC−06:00).

=== Draw 1 ===
Tuesday, January 21, 8:00 am

Sheet 1	1	2	3	4	5	6	7	8	9	10	11	Final
Amber Holland 🔨	1	0	0	2	3	1	0	0	0	2	0	9
Jessica McCartney	0	1	0	0	0	0	6	1	1	0	1	10

Sheet 2	1	2	3	4	5	6	7	8	9	10	Final
Ashley Thevenot	0	0	0	0	1	0	0	0	1	X	2
Penny Barker 🔨	0	1	0	1	0	2	1	1	0	X	6

Sheet 3	1	2	3	4	5	6	7	8	9	10	Final
Michelle Englot	1	0	1	0	1	0	1	X	X	X	4
Jolene Campbell 🔨	0	2	0	4	0	3	0	X	X	X	9

Sheet 4	1	2	3	4	5	6	7	8	9	10	11	Final
Nancy Martin	1	0	0	2	1	0	2	0	1	0	0	7
Mandy Selzer 🔨	0	0	3	0	0	2	0	1	0	1	1	8

=== Draw 2 ===
Tuesday, January 21, 4:00 pm

Sheet 1	1	2	3	4	5	6	7	8	9	10	Final
Nancy Martin 🔨	1	2	0	1	0	0	2	2	X	X	8
Brooklyn Stevenson	0	0	1	0	1	1	0	0	X	X	3

Sheet 2	1	2	3	4	5	6	7	8	9	10	Final
Michelle Englot 🔨	0	0	0	2	1	2	0	0	0	1	6
Mandy Selzer	0	1	1	0	0	0	0	0	2	0	4

Sheet 3	1	2	3	4	5	6	7	8	9	10	Final
Penny Barker	0	0	2	1	2	0	1	1	X	X	7
Jessica McCartney 🔨	0	0	0	0	0	1	0	0	X	X	1

Sheet 4	1	2	3	4	5	6	7	8	9	10	Final
Ashley Thevenot	0	1	0	2	0	0	2	3	0	X	8
Amber Holland 🔨	1	0	1	0	1	1	0	0	1	X	5

=== Draw 3 ===
Wednesday, January 22, 8:00 am

Sheet 1	1	2	3	4	5	6	7	8	9	10	Final
Michelle Englot	0	1	0	0	0	0	1	0	X	X	2
Penny Barker 🔨	2	0	1	3	1	1	0	1	X	X	9

Sheet 2	1	2	3	4	5	6	7	8	9	10	11	Final
Nancy Martin	1	0	1	0	0	2	0	0	0	2	1	7
Jessica McCartney 🔨	0	0	0	1	1	0	0	3	1	0	0	6

Sheet 3	1	2	3	4	5	6	7	8	9	10	Final
Mandy Selzer	0	0	2	0	0	3	0	0	1	X	6
Amber Holland 🔨	0	2	0	0	3	0	1	2	0	X	8

Sheet 4	1	2	3	4	5	6	7	8	9	10	Final
Brooklyn Stevenson	0	0	0	3	0	1	0	0	0	X	4
Jolene Campbell 🔨	0	0	2	0	2	0	0	1	2	X	7

=== Draw 4 ===
Wednesday, January 22, 4:00 pm

Sheet 1	1	2	3	4	5	6	7	8	9	10	Final
Mandy Selzer	0	0	0	2	1	1	0	3	0	4	11
Jessica McCartney 🔨	0	1	1	0	0	0	1	0	2	0	5

Sheet 2	1	2	3	4	5	6	7	8	9	10	Final
Amber Holland	0	0	1	0	1	0	0	X	X	X	2
Jolene Campbell 🔨	2	1	0	3	0	2	1	X	X	X	9

Sheet 3	1	2	3	4	5	6	7	8	9	10	Final
Ashley Thevenot 🔨	0	0	1	1	2	2	0	1	X	X	7
Brooklyn Stevenson	0	0	0	0	0	0	1	0	X	X	1

Sheet 4	1	2	3	4	5	6	7	8	9	10	Final
Michelle Englot 🔨	3	0	0	0	0	0	1	0	X	X	4
Nancy Martin	0	1	2	2	3	1	0	3	X	X	12

=== Draw 5 ===
Thursday, January 23, 12:00 pm

Sheet 1	1	2	3	4	5	6	7	8	9	10	Final
Ashley Thevenot	0	0	0	0	2	1	1	0	1	0	5
Jolene Campbell 🔨	1	1	1	1	0	0	0	2	0	1	7

Sheet 2	1	2	3	4	5	6	7	8	9	10	Final
Mandy Selzer 🔨	0	3	0	2	0	1	0	0	0	1	7
Brooklyn Stevenson	1	0	1	0	2	0	0	1	0	0	5

Sheet 3	1	2	3	4	5	6	7	8	9	10	Final
Michelle Englot	2	0	1	0	2	0	0	0	0	1	6
Jessica McCartney 🔨	0	1	0	1	0	0	3	0	0	0	5

Sheet 4	1	2	3	4	5	6	7	8	9	10	Final
Penny Barker 🔨	0	2	0	0	0	2	1	2	0	X	7
Amber Holland	0	0	2	1	1	0	0	0	1	X	5

=== Draw 6 ===
Thursday, January 23, 8:00 pm

Sheet 1	1	2	3	4	5	6	7	8	9	10	Final
Michelle Englot 🔨	3	2	0	0	0	1	0	0	1	2	9
Amber Holland	0	0	1	1	1	0	2	1	0	0	6

Sheet 2	1	2	3	4	5	6	7	8	9	10	Final
Penny Barker	0	3	0	0	0	2	0	0	0	X	5
Jolene Campbell 🔨	3	0	2	1	1	0	1	1	2	X	11

Sheet 3	1	2	3	4	5	6	7	8	9	10	Final
Ashley Thevenot	0	1	0	2	0	1	0	1	1	X	6
Nancy Martin 🔨	2	0	1	0	2	0	3	0	0	X	8

Sheet 4	1	2	3	4	5	6	7	8	9	10	11	Final
Brooklyn Stevenson 🔨	1	0	2	1	0	1	0	2	0	0	0	7
Jessica McCartney	0	1	0	0	2	0	2	0	1	1	1	8

=== Draw 7 ===
Friday, January 24, 12:00 pm

Sheet 1	1	2	3	4	5	6	7	8	9	10	Final
Nancy Martin	0	0	0	0	0	1	0	2	0	X	3
Jolene Campbell 🔨	0	0	0	2	2	0	1	0	3	X	8

Sheet 2	1	2	3	4	5	6	7	8	9	10	Final
Ashley Thevenot 🔨	0	2	0	1	0	2	0	2	0	2	9
Jessica McCartney	0	0	1	0	1	0	1	0	3	0	6

Sheet 3	1	2	3	4	5	6	7	8	9	10	11	Final
Amber Holland 🔨	2	0	0	0	1	1	0	0	0	3	0	7
Brooklyn Stevenson	0	0	1	1	0	0	0	3	2	0	2	9

Sheet 4	1	2	3	4	5	6	7	8	9	10	Final
Penny Barker 🔨	2	0	2	0	1	1	0	1	1	X	8
Mandy Selzer	0	1	0	1	0	0	1	0	0	X	3

=== Draw 8 ===
Friday, January 24, 8:00 pm

Sheet 1	1	2	3	4	5	6	7	8	9	10	Final
Penny Barker 🔨	2	1	0	0	0	1	0	2	0	1	7
Brooklyn Stevenson	0	0	2	1	2	0	2	0	1	0	8

Sheet 2	1	2	3	4	5	6	7	8	9	10	Final
Nancy Martin 🔨	1	0	4	0	4	0	X	X	X	X	9
Amber Holland	0	1	0	1	0	2	X	X	X	X	4

Sheet 3	1	2	3	4	5	6	7	8	9	10	11	Final
Mandy Selzer	0	0	1	1	0	2	0	1	0	2	0	7
Jolene Campbell 🔨	0	1	0	0	2	0	2	0	2	0	1	8

Sheet 4	1	2	3	4	5	6	7	8	9	10	Final
Michelle Englot	0	0	0	0	0	2	0	1	X	X	3
Ashley Thevenot 🔨	0	2	0	1	3	0	2	0	X	X	8

=== Draw 9 ===
Saturday, January 25, 10:00 am

Sheet 1	1	2	3	4	5	6	7	8	9	10	Final
Ashley Thevenot 🔨	1	1	0	2	0	0	2	1	0	2	9
Mandy Selzer	0	0	2	0	2	1	0	0	1	0	6

Sheet 2	1	2	3	4	5	6	7	8	9	10	Final
Michelle Englot 🔨	1	2	0	0	0	1	0	0	1	0	5
Brooklyn Stevenson	0	0	0	2	1	0	0	2	0	3	8

Sheet 3	1	2	3	4	5	6	7	8	9	10	Final
Nancy Martin 🔨	0	1	0	0	5	3	0	2	X	X	11
Penny Barker	1	0	0	1	0	0	2	0	X	X	4

Sheet 4	1	2	3	4	5	6	7	8	9	10	11	Final
Jessica McCartney	0	0	0	0	2	2	0	3	0	1	1	9
Jolene Campbell 🔨	0	0	1	2	0	0	2	0	3	0	0	8

== Playoffs ==
Page playoff system
1	Jolene Campbell	9
2	Nancy Martin	2
3	Penny Barker	5
4	Ashley Thevenot	8

Semifinal
2	Nancy Martin	15
4	Ashley Thevenot	8

Final
1	Jolene Campbell	7
2	Nancy Martin	8

=== 1 vs. 2 ===
Saturday, January 25, 7:00 pm

Sheet 2	1	2	3	4	5	6	7	8	9	10	Final
Jolene Campbell 🔨	0	2	1	0	2	1	0	3	X	X	9
Nancy Martin	0	0	0	1	0	0	1	0	X	X	2

=== 3 vs. 4 ===
Saturday, January 25, 7:00 pm

Sheet 1	1	2	3	4	5	6	7	8	9	10	Final
Penny Barker 🔨	0	2	0	1	0	1	0	1	0	0	5
Ashley Thevenot	1	0	2	0	2	0	1	0	1	1	8

=== Semifinal ===
Sunday, January 26, 9:00 am

Sheet 3	1	2	3	4	5	6	7	8	9	10	Final
Nancy Martin 🔨	3	2	0	3	0	0	3	0	4	X	15
Ashley Thevenot	0	0	3	0	2	1	0	2	0	X	8

=== Final ===
Sunday, January 26, 3:00 pm

Sheet 2	1	2	3	4	5	6	7	8	9	10	Final
Jolene Campbell 🔨	0	0	0	0	3	0	1	0	3	0	7
Nancy Martin	2	0	1	1	0	1	0	2	0	1	8

2025 Viterra Prairie Pinnacle

Nancy Martin
1st Saskatchewan Provincial Championship title
