= Saskatoon Business College =

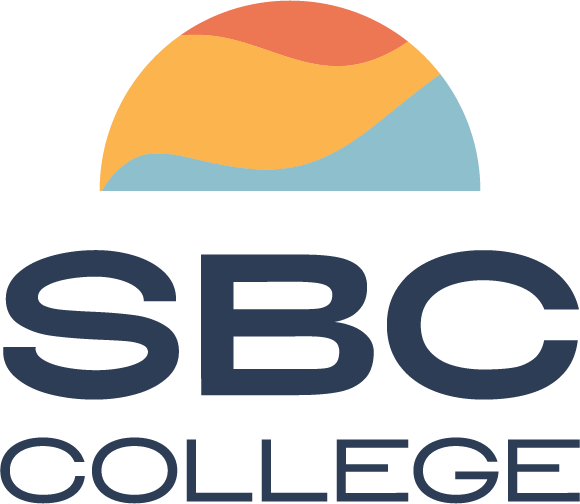
- Former name: Success Business College
- Motto: Better Jobs, Brighter Future
- Type: Vocational College
- Established: 1907
- Students: 350
- Location: Saskatoon, Saskatchewan, Canada; 52.1310°N 106.6614°W
- Campus: Urban
- Colours: Blue and Orange
- Website: www.sbccollege.ca

Saskatoon Business College is a regulated vocational career college located in Saskatoon, Saskatchewan, Canada. The college grants vocational diplomas, as well as skills training certification, and Corporate Training.

== Programs ==
The college grants vocational diplomas in areas of Office Administration (including Legal, Medical and Executive Assistant), Business Administration, Accounting, Graphic Design, and IT Network Administration. All diploma programs take one year or less to complete. In August 2014, Saskatoon Business College was named a Designated Learning Institution for International Students planning to study in Saskatchewan.

== History ==
Saskatoon Business College was founded by Robert D. Campbell in May of 1907. Ernest Marshall and David Marshall (unrelated) can be credited for bringing the College forward. From the late 1920s to early 1950s the College was affiliated with the Success Business College chain of schools as part of a Canada-wide chain of colleges operated by Frederick Garbutt (1876-1947) of Calgary, Alberta. During this time, the College assumed name titles such as the Saskatoon-Success Business College, as well as the Success Secretarial College and School of Accountancy. Briefly held by Lewis Furse, Success College was acquired by Fred and Helen Chapman in 1951 who reverted the College back to its original name, Saskatoon Business College. Saskatoon Business College moved from its Second Avenue location to the Third Avenue business district in 1961. In January 2025, Saskatoon Business College was purchased by Sundance College of Calgary, retaining its Saskatoon Business College brand.

== Corporate Training ==
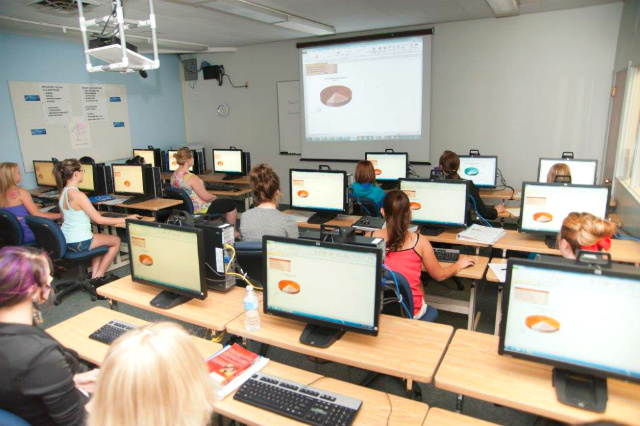
SBC students are taught Microsoft-approved curriculum.

Saskatoon Business College’s Corporate Division offers training with Windows OS, as well as the Microsoft Office suite, as well as skills certification training in graphic design, Network Administration, and soft skills like coaching and time management.

== Affiliations ==
- Shinerama - Cystic Fibrosis

== See also ==
- Higher education in Saskatchewan
- List of colleges in Canada § Saskatchewan
