= Jolene Campbell =

Canadian curler (born 1981)

- Curler
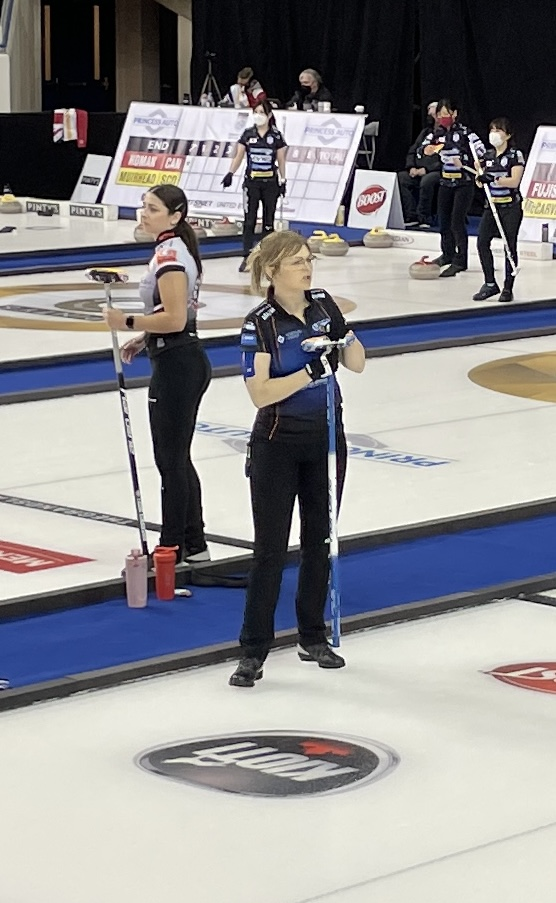
- Campbell at the 2022 Players' Championship
- Born: Jolene McIvor; August 12, 1981 (age 45); Saskatoon, Saskatchewan

Team
- Curling club: Highland CC, Regina, SK

Curling career
- Member Association: Saskatchewan (2001–2022; 2024–present); Manitoba (2022–2024)
- Hearts: 6 (2010, 2011, 2012, 2016, 2022, 2026)
- World Championship: 1 (2011)
- Top CTRS ranking: 6th (2021–22)
Medal record
Curling
World Championships
Representing Canada
Silver medal – second place	2011 Esbjerg
Representing Saskatchewan
Scotties Tournament of Hearts
Gold medal – first place	2011 Charlottetown

Jolene Campbell (born Jolene McIvor on August 12, 1981) is a Canadian retired curler from Regina, Saskatchewan.

== Curling career ==
=== Juniors ===
Born in Saskatoon, Campbell won a provincial junior title in 2002, skipping a team consisting of Teejay Surik, Janelle Lemon and Maegan Strueby. At the 2002 Canadian Junior Curling Championships she led Saskatchewan to a third-place finish, after losing in the semifinal to Prince Edward Island's Suzanne Gaudet.

=== Women's ===
Campbell and her team of Sherry Linton, Allison Slupski and Marcia Gudereit, would win the Schmirler Curling Classic in 2007. Campbell was also the alternate for the Amber Holland rink. She played in three Scotties to date as a member of the team, going 6-5 in 2010 and 2012 and winning it in 2011. The team won a silver medal at the 2011 Capital One World Women's Curling Championship in Denmark. Campbell was seven months pregnant at the time.

At the 2012 Scotties Tournament of Hearts, Holland would utilize Campbell as fifth player, when Tammy Schneider was injured. Campbell would play six out of eleven round robin games, and finished round robin with the highest player percentages among seconds. The following season, Campbell played third for the Amber Holland rink which included Brooklyn Lemon and Dailene Sivertson at front end. Campbell won one World Curling Tour event as a member of the Holland rink, the 2013 Boundary Ford Curling Classic. The team placed third at the 2013 Saskatchewan Scotties Tournament of Hearts and tied for fifth at the 2014 Saskatchewan Scotties Tournament of Hearts. After the season, Campbell left the Holland rink to form her own team, including former Scottish champion Kelly Schafer (formerly Wood), Teejay Haichert and Kelsey Dutton.

Campbell would start to notably find success again with her new team during the 2024-25 curling season, skipping a new team with Rachel Erickson, Abby Ackland and Dayna Demmans. The team began at the 2024 PointsBet Invitational which they qualified for through CTRS points. In the opening round, they lost 8–5 to Kate Cameron. On tour, they only reached the playoffs once at the Martensville International where they made the semifinals. They also played in the 2024 Tour Challenge Tier 2, however, finished 1–3. Although they struggled throughout the tour season, Team Campbell turned things around at the 2025 Viterra Prairie Pinnacle, going 7–1 through the round robin and earning a spot in the 1 vs. 2 game where they beat Nancy Martin. Facing Martin again in the final, the team was unable to overcome an early four-point deficit, losing 8–7 and finishing second. Ackland then left the rink and was replaced by Robyn Silvernagle for the 2025–26 season. On tour, the team made one final in Moose Jaw and qualified in four other events. At provincials, they finished second through the round robin with a 6–2 record but then knocked off the previously undefeated Ashley Thevenot 10–7 to qualify for the championship game. There, after losing the final in 2017, 2018 and 2025, Campbell won her first provincial championship as a skip when her team beat Jana Tisdale 4–3.

== Personal life ==
Campbell is a graduate from the University of Saskatchewan and works as a communications officer with the Regina Police Service. She is married to Greg Campbell and has three children.

== Grand Slam record ==
Key
C	Champion
F	Lost in Final
SF	Lost in Semifinal
QF	Lost in Quarterfinals
R16	Lost in the round of 16
Q	Did not advance to playoffs
T2	Played in Tier 2 event
DNP	Did not participate in event
N/A	Not a Grand Slam event that season

Event	2005–06	2006–07	2007–08	2008–09	2009–10	2010–11	2011–12	2012–13	2013–14	2014–15	2015–16	2016–17	2017–18	2018–19	2019–20	2020–21	2021–22	2022–23	2023–24	2024–25
Tour Challenge	N/A	N/A	N/A	N/A	N/A	N/A	N/A	N/A	N/A	N/A	DNP	DNP	T2	T2	DNP	N/A	N/A	Q	T2	T2
Canadian Open	N/A	N/A	N/A	N/A	N/A	N/A	N/A	N/A	N/A	DNP	DNP	DNP	DNP	DNP	DNP	N/A	N/A	DNP	Q	DNP
The National	N/A	N/A	N/A	N/A	N/A	N/A	N/A	N/A	N/A	N/A	DNP	DNP	DNP	DNP	DNP	N/A	DNP	Q	DNP	DNP
Players'	QF	DNP	DNP	DNP	Q (Note: Campbell spared for Amber Holland.)	DNP	DNP	DNP	DNP	DNP	DNP	DNP	DNP	DNP	N/A	DNP	Q	DNP	DNP	DNP
Champions Cup	N/A	N/A	N/A	N/A	N/A	N/A	N/A	N/A	N/A	N/A	DNP	DNP	DNP	SF (Note: Campbell spared for Joanne Courtney on Team Rachel Homan.)	N/A	DNP	DNP	Q (Note: Campbell spared for Jocelyn Peterman on Team Kaitlyn Lawes.)	N/A	N/A

=== Former events ===
Event	2006–07	2007–08	2008–09	2009–10	2010–11	2011–12	2012–13	2013–14
Autumn Gold	DNP	Q	DNP	DNP	Q	DNP	Q	Q
Colonial Square	N/A	N/A	N/A	N/A	N/A	N/A	R16	Q
Manitoba Liquor & Lotteries	Q	DNP	DNP	DNP	DNP	DNP	Q	Q
Sobeys Slam	N/A	Q	DNP	N/A	Q	N/A	N/A	N/A
