= Jill Shumay =

Canadian curler

- Curler
- Born: October 23, 1974 (age 52); Maidstone, Saskatchewan, Canada

Team
- Curling club: Maidstone CC, Maidstone, SK
- Skip: Amber Holland
- Third: Jill Shumay
- Second: Sherri Singler
- Lead: Ternna Derdall

Curling career
- Member Association: Saskatchewan
- Hearts: 1 (2013)

Jill Marie Shumay (née Johnston; born October 23, 1974) is a Canadian curler from Saskatoon, Saskatchewan. She won the 2013 Saskatchewan Scotties Tournament of Hearts, representing the province at the 2013 Scotties Tournament of Hearts, Canada's national women's curling championship.

== Career ==
Shumay was born in Maidstone, Saskatchewan, and grew up on a farm north of the town.

As a junior curler, she played in four provincial championships, making it as far as the provincial final in 1993.

Shumay won her lone provincial women's title in 2013 with her cousin Kara Johnston playing third, and front-end teammates Taryn Holtby (Schachtel) and Jinaye Ayrey. The rink finished the round robin undefeated in her group, and lost to Stefanie Lawton in the page playoff game. However, the team won the semifinal against Amber Holland and defeated the Lawton rink in the final, after a 10th end hit and stick. The win sent Shumay to her first national championship, where she led her team to a fifth place with a 6–5 win–loss record. Shumay's rink could not repeat at the 2014 Saskatchewan Scotties Tournament of Hearts, losing in a tie breaker match.

In 2014, Shumay replaced Johnston with Nancy Martin at third.

Shumay has not curled competitively since 2015.

== Personal life ==
Shumay works as an account receivable administrator with Saskatoon Media Group. She attended Maidstone Composite High School, Lakeland College and Saskatoon Business College.

At the time of the 2013 Hearts, Shumay was living in Martensville, Saskatchewan.
