= Dailene Pewarchuk =

Canadian curler

- Curler
- Born: Dailene Sivertson; August 16, 1990 (age 36); Saskatoon, Saskatchewan, Canada

Team
- Curling club: Victoria CC, Victoria, BC

Curling career
- Member Association: British Columbia
- Hearts: 2 (2012, 2020)
- Top CTRS ranking: 10th (2011–12)
Medal record
Curling
Representing British Columbia
Scotties Tournament of Hearts
Silver medal – second place	2012 Red Deer
World Junior Curling Championships
Silver medal – second place	2011 Perth
Canadian Junior Curling Championships
Silver medal – second place	2010 Sorel-Tracy
Bronze medal – third place	2007 St. Catharines

Dailene Pewarchuk (born Dailene Sivertson; August 16, 1990) is a Canadian curler from Victoria, British Columbia.

== Career ==
=== Juniors ===
Pewarchuk made her national curling debut at the 2007 Canadian Junior Curling Championships, skipping her team out of the Victoria Curling Club. They would finish round robin with an 8-4 record, which was enough to secure a spot in the semi-final. They would lose to Manitoba's Calleen Neufeld.

Pewarchuk would win her second B.C Junior Championship in 2010. At the 2010 Canadian Junior Curling Championships the team would once again finish with an 8-4 record, which was enough to secure a spot in a tie breaker. Pewarchuk's team would win two tie breakers and the semi-final. They would meet Ontario's Rachel Homan in the final, where they would lose 5-9.

Pewarchuk's third and final B.C Junior Championship was won in 2011. Her team would represent B.C at the 2011 Canadian Junior Curling Championships, however they would miss the playoffs, finishing with a 7-4 record. The event would be won by Saskatchewan's Trish Paulsen. Pewarchuk would accompany Paulsen and her team as their 5th player for the 2011 World Junior Curling Championships. The team would make it to the final, but lose to Scotland's Eve Muirhead.

=== 2011-2014 ===
At the end of the 2010–2011 season, Pewarchuk would receive an invitation to join the Kelly Scott team, to replace Jeanna Schraeder, who was leaving the team to give birth to her third child. Pewarchuk would relocate to Kelowna from Victoria. Together the team would defeat Marla Mallett at the 2012 British Columbia Scotties Tournament of Hearts, earning the right to represent the province at the 2012 Scotties Tournament of Hearts. The team would find difficulties with illness and lineup changes, but also found success at the event. They would finish round robin with an 8–3 record, which was enough to secure a second-place finish and earned a spot in the 1 vs. 2 game against Manitoba's Jennifer Jones. The team would defeat Jones in the 1 vs. 2 game 7-5 advancing to the final but would lose the final in a close game to Alberta's Heather Nedohin 7-6.

After a successful season curling with Team Scott, Pewarchuk made a decision to return to Saskatchewan, and for the 2012–13 season joined the Amber Holland rink, playing lead for her new squad. The team also included Holland's longtime alternate Jolene Campbell at third and Brooklyn Lemon at second. Pewarchuk played two seasons with Holland, playing lead in 2012-13 and second (switching places with Lemon) in 2013-14. During this time, the Holland rink finished third at the 2013 Saskatchewan Scotties Tournament of Hearts and tied for 5th at the 2014 Saskatchewan Scotties Tournament of Hearts. The team also won one World Curling Tour event, the 2013 Boundary Ford Curling Classic.

In 2014, Pewarchuk left the Holland rink, to form a team based in Victoria, consisting of Steph Baier, Jessie Sanderson and Carley St. Blaze.

== Personal life ==
Pewarchuk was set to graduate with a business degree from the University of Regina in August 2014. Pewarchuk is employed as a chartered professional accountant instructor at Camosun College. She is married and has one son.
