= Teejay Haichert =

Canadian curler

- Curler
- Born: Teejay Surik; September 8, 1983 (age 43); Biggar, Saskatchewan

Team
- Curling club: Swift Current CC, Swift Current, SK

Curling career
- Hearts: 2 (2008, 2009)
- World Mixed Championship: 1 (2024)
Medal record
Women's curling
Representing Canada
World Junior Championships
Gold medal – first place	2003 Flims

Teejay Haichert (née Surik, born September 8, 1983, in Biggar, Saskatchewan) is a Canadian curler from Swift Current, Saskatchewan.

Haichert played third for Marliese Kasner at the 2003 Canadian Junior Curling Championships which they won. They then won the World Junior Curling Championships that year, defeating the U.S. in the final. Haichert skipped her own Junior rink to a Saskatchewan provincial championship the following year. At the 2004 Canadian Junior Curling Championships, Surik's team finished with an 8-4 record, just out of the playoffs in 4th place.

In 2007, Haichert's then boyfriend moved to Yellowknife to be a firefighter, and Surik went with him, and she then joined up with Kerry Galusha. The new team won the Yukon/Northwest Territories championship in 2008, and Surik played in her first Scotties Tournament of Hearts where the team finished with a disappointing 1-10 record.

Haichert would later move back to Saskatchewan, and last played competitive women's curling on the Jolene Campbell rink in the 2014-15 season. Since then, she has been successful in mixed curling, winning four provincial and two national Canadian Mixed Curling Championships. Haichert played lead for team Saskatchewan (skipped by Max Kirkpatrick) at the 2015 Canadian Mixed Curling Championship. The team won the event, and went on to represent Canada at the inaugural 2015 World Mixed Curling Championship. There, the team was eliminated in the quarterfinals against Russia. Haichert played lead for Saskatchewan again at the 2020 Canadian Mixed Curling Championship, this time on a rink skipped by Shaun Meachem. There, the team finished with a 5–5 record. The team made it again at the 2022 Canadian Mixed Curling Championship, improving with a 6–4 record, but still missing the playoffs. The team won a third straight provincial title, making it to the 2023 Canadian Mixed Curling Championship. There the team finally found success, winning the event.
