= 2008 Canada Cup of Curling =

2008 Strauss Canada Cup of Curling
- Host city: Kamloops, British Columbia
- Arena: Interior Savings Centre
- Dates: February 27-March 2
- Men's winner: (Alberta) Kevin Koe
- Curling club: Saville Sports Centre, Edmonton
- Skip: Kevin Koe
- Fourth: Blake MacDonald
- Second: Carter Rycroft
- Lead: Nolan Thiessen
- Finalist: (Alberta) Kevin Martin
- Women's winner: (Saskatchewan) Stefanie Lawton
- Curling club: CN Curling Club, Saskatoon
- Skip: Stefanie Lawton
- Third: Marliese Kasner
- Second: Sherri Singler
- Lead: Lana Vey
- Finalist: (British Columbia) Kelly Scott

The 2008 Strauss Canada Cup was held February 27 to March 2 at the Interior Savings Centre in Kamloops, British Columbia. The men's champion was Kevin Koe and the women's champion was Stefanie Lawton.

== Men's ==
=== Teams ===
- (Ontario) Glenn Howard (2007 Tim Hortons Brier winner)
- (Alberta) Randy Ferbey (2007 Canada Cup of Curling winner)
- (Alberta) Kevin Martin (2007 Players' Championships winner)
- (Alberta) Kevin Koe (JSI Qualifier)
- (Manitoba) Mike McEwen (JSI Qualifier)
- (New Brunswick) ~~Russ Howard (JSI Qualifier)~~ (dropped out)
- (Manitoba) Kerry Burtnyk (JSI Qualifier)
- (Manitoba) Jeff Stoughton (4th, CCA rankings as of Dec. 18, 2007)
- (Saskatchewan) Pat Simmons (7th, CCA rankings as of Dec. 18, 2007)
- (Newfoundland and Labrador) Brad Gushue (8th, CCA rankings as of Dec. 18, 2007)
- (Manitoba) Reid Carruthers (invited as replacement), with (Alberta) Charley Thomas as replacement skip

Skip	Third	Second	Lead	Locale
Kerry Burtnyk	Dan Kammerlock	Richard Daneault	Garth Smith	(Manitoba) Assiniboine Memorial Curling Club, Winnipeg
David Nedohin	Randy Ferbey (skip)	Scott Pfeifer	Marcel Rocque	(Alberta) Granite Curling Club, Edmonton
Brad Gushue	Mark Nichols	Chris Schille	David Noftall	(Newfoundland and Labrador) Bally Haly Golf & Curling Club St. John's
Glenn Howard	Richard Hart	Brent Laing	Craig Savill	(Ontario) Coldwater & District Curling Club, Coldwater
Blake MacDonald	Kevin Koe (skip)	Carter Rycroft	Nolan Thiessen	(Alberta) Saville Sports Centre, Edmonton
Kevin Martin	Kevin Park	Marc Kennedy	Ben Hebert	(Alberta) Saville Sports Centre, Edmonton
Mike McEwen	B. J. Neufeld	Matt Wozniak	Denni Neufeld	(Manitoba) Assiniboine Memorial Curling Club, Winnipeg
Pat Simmons	Jeff Sharp	Gerry Adam	Steve Laycock	(Saskatchewan) Davidson Curling Club, Davidson
Jeff Stoughton	Ryan Fry	Rob Fowler	Steve Gould	(Manitoba) Charleswood Curling Club, Winnipeg
Charley Thomas	Jason Gunnlaugson	Justin Richter	Tyler Forrest	(Manitoba) Beausejour Curling Club, Beausejour

=== Standings ===
Key
Teams to Playoffs
Teams to Tiebreaker

==== Group A ====
Team	W	L
(Alberta) Koe	4	1
(Saskatchewan) Simmons	2	3
(Alberta) Martin	2	3
(Manitoba) Stoughton	2	3
(Manitoba) McEwen	2	3

==== Group B ====
Team	W	L
(Newfoundland and Labrador) Gushue	4	1
(Ontario) Howard	4	1
(Alberta) Ferbey	3	2
(Manitoba) Burtnyk	1	4
(Manitoba) Carruthers	1	4

=== Tie-breakers ===
- Tie-Breaker #1: Martin 8-7 Stoughton
- Tie-Breaker #1: Simmons 8-6 McEwen
- Tie-Breaker #2: Martin 10-2 Simmons

=== Playoffs ===
Page playoff system
A1	(Alberta) Koe	7
B1	(Newfoundland and Labrador) Gushue	5
A2	(Alberta) Martin	7
B2	(Ontario) Howard	6

Semifinal
B1	(Newfoundland and Labrador) Gushue	2
A2	(Alberta) Martin	8

Final
A1	(Alberta) Koe	6
A2	(Alberta) Martin	5

== Women's ==
=== Teams ===
- (British Columbia) Kelly Scott (2007 Scotties Tournament of Hearts winner)
- (Manitoba) Jennifer Jones (2007 Canada Cup of Curling and Player's Championships winner)
- (Alberta) Cheryl Bernard (Diversified Qualifier)
- (Ontario) ~~Sherry Middaugh (Diversified Qualifier)~~ (dropped out)
- (Saskatchewan) Stefanie Lawton (Diversified Qualifier)
- (Manitoba) Janet Harvey (Diversified Qualifier)
- (Alberta) Shannon Kleibrink (1st, CCA rankings as of Dec. 18, 2007)
- (Alberta) Cathy King (7th, CCA rankings as of Dec. 18, 2007)
- (Saskatchewan) Sherry Anderson (8th, CCA rankings as of Dec. 18, 2007)
- (Saskatchewan) ~~Michelle Englot (9th, CCA rankings as of Dec. 18, 2007)~~ (dropped out)
- (Alberta) Kristie Moore (invited as replacement)
- (Alberta) Heather Rankin (invited as replacement)

Skip	Third	Second	Lead	Locale
Sherry Anderson	Kim Hodson	Heather Walsh	Donna Gignac	(Saskatchewan) CN Curling Club, Saskatoon
Cheryl Bernard	Susan O'Connor	Carolyn Darbyshire	Cori Bartel	(Alberta) Calgary Curling Club & Calgary Winter Club, Calgary
Janet Harvey	Cherie-Ann Loder	Kristin Loder	Carey Kirby	(Manitoba) Fort Rouge Curling Club, Winnipeg
Jennifer Jones	Cathy Overton-Clapham	Jill Officer	Dawn Askin	(Manitoba) St. Vital Curling Club, Winnipeg
Cathy King	Lori Olson	Raylene Rocque	Tracy Bush	(Alberta) Saville Sports Centre, Edmonton
Shannon Kleibrink	Amy Nixon	Bronwen Saunders	Chelsey Bell	(Alberta) Calgary Winter Club, Calgary
Stefanie Lawton	Marliese Kasner	Sherri Singler	Lana Vey	(Saskatchewan) CN Curling Club, Saskatoon
Heather Nedohin	Kristie Moore (skip)	Beth Iskiw	Pam Appelman	(Alberta) Saville Sports Centre, Edmonton
Heather Rankin	Deanna Doig	Heather Moulding	Kyla MacLachlan	(Alberta) Calgary Winter Club, Calgary
Kelly Scott	Jeanna Schraeder (Note: Karla Sparks temporarily replaced Schraeder and played lead, with Carter and Simons moving up their positions.)	Sasha Carter	Renee Simons	(British Columbia) Kelowna Curling Club, Kelowna

=== Standings ===
Key
Teams to Playoffs

==== Group A ====
Team	W	L
(Alberta) Bernard	5	0
(Manitoba) Jones	4	1
(Saskatchewan) Anderson	3	2
(Alberta) King	1	4
(Manitoba) Harvey	0	5

==== Group B ====
Team	W	L
(Saskatchewan) Lawton	4	1
(British Columbia) Scott	4	1
(Alberta) Kleibrink	3	2
(Alberta) Moore	1	4
(Alberta) Rankin	0	5

=== Playoffs ===
Page playoff system
A1	(Alberta) Bernard	6
B1	(Saskatchewan) Lawton	7
A2	(Manitoba) Jones	9
B2	(British Columbia) Scott	10

Semifinal
A1	(Alberta) Bernard	6
B2	(British Columbia) Scott	10

Final
B1	(Saskatchewan) Lawton	7
B2	(British Columbia) Scott	4

== Qualifying ==
The Four qualifying positions in both the men's and women's events were held December 12–16, 2007. The men's qualifier was held at the Ottawa Curling Club and Rideau Curling Club in Ottawa while the women's qualifier was held at the Saville Sports Centre in Edmonton.

=== John Shea Insurance Canada Cup Qualifier (Men) ===
Quarter-Finals
(New Brunswick)	Russ Howard	8
(Saskatchewan)	Joel Jordison	6
(Manitoba)	Mike McEwen	8
(Ontario)	Nick Rizzo	0
(Manitoba)	Kerry Burtnyk	11
(Alberta)	Jamie King	5
(Alberta)	Kevin Koe	7
(Manitoba)	Jeff Stoughton	6

Semi-Finals
(New Brunswick)	Russ Howard	8
(Manitoba)	Mike McEwen	9
(Manitoba)	Kerry Burtnyk	5
(Alberta)	Kevin Koe	6

Final
(Manitoba)	Mike McEwen	3
(Alberta)	Kevin Koe	5

Teams:

- (Nova Scotia) Shawn Adams
- (Ontario) Chad Allen
- (Manitoba) Kerry Burtnyk
- (Quebec) Ted Butler
- (Manitoba) Reid Carruthers
- (Ontario) Peter Corner
- (Quebec) Robert Desjardins
- (Quebec) Martin Ferland
- (Quebec) Dwayne Fowler
- (Ontario) Joe Frans
- (Quebec) Francois Gagné
- (British Columbia) Sean Geall
- (New Brunswick) James Grattan
- (Newfoundland and Labrador) Brad Gushue
- (Saskatchewan) Brad Heidt
- (Quebec) Guy Hemmings
- (British Columbia) Dean Horning
- (New Brunswick) Russ Howard
- (British Columbia) Dean Joanisse
- (Alberta) Mark Johnson
- (Saskatchewan) Joel Jordison
- (Saskatchewan) Shawn Joyce
- (Nova Scotia) Mark Kehoe
- (Alberta) Jamie King
- (Manitoba) James Krikness
- (Alberta) Kevin Koe
- (Ontario) Cary Luner
- (Manitoba) Allan Lyburn
- (Alberta) Brent MacDonald
- (Ontario) Heath McCormick
- (Ontario) Jeff McCrady
- (Manitoba) Mike McEwen
- (Quebec) Jean-Michel Ménard
- (Alberta) John Morris (already qualified as part of team Kevin Martin)
- (Alberta) Darren Moulding
- (Alberta) Shane Park
- (Alberta) Dan Petryk
- (Ontario) Tim Phillips
- (Ontario) Howard Rajala
- (Quebec) Serge Reid
- (Ontario) Greg Richardson
- (Ontario) Nick Rizzo
- (Saskatchewan) Pat Simmons
- (Manitoba) Don Spriggs
- (Manitoba) Jeff Stoughton
- (New Brunswick) Jim Sullivan

=== Diversified Transportation Canada Cup Qualifier (Women) ===
Quarter-Finals
(Saskatchewan)	Stefanie Lawton	9
(Saskatchewan)	Michelle Englot	2
(Alberta)	Cheryl Bernard	7
(Newfoundland and Labrador)	Heather Strong	3
(Ontario)	Sherry Middaugh	8
(Ontario)	Krista McCarville	6
(Manitoba)	Janet Harvey	9
(Alberta)	Deb Santos	5

Semi-Finals
(Saskatchewan)	Stefanie Lawton	6
(Alberta)	Cheryl Bernard	7
(Ontario)	Sherry Middaugh	6
(Manitoba)	Janet Harvey	5

Final
(Alberta)	Cheryl Bernard	5
(Ontario)	Sherry Middaugh	3

Teams:

- (Saskatchewan) Sherry Anderson
- (British Columbia) Jerri-Pat Armstrong
- (Quebec) Ève Bélisle
- (Alberta) Cheryl Bernard
- (Manitoba) Chelsea Carey
- (Alberta) Joanne Delanoy
- (Saskatchewan) Chantelle Eberle
- (Saskatchewan) Michelle Englot
- (Northwest Territories) Kerry Galusha
- (Prince Edward Island) Suzanne Gaudet
- (Ontario) Alison Goring
- (Ontario) Jenn Hanna
- (Nova Scotia) Meredith Harrison
- (Manitoba) Janet Harvey
- (Saskatchewan) Amber Holland
- (Ontario) Rachel Homan
- (Manitoba) Kristy Jenion
- (Alberta) Lisa Johnson
- (Nova Scotia) Colleen Jones
- (New Brunswick) Andrea Kelly
- (Alberta) Cathy King
- (Alberta) Shannon Kleibrink
- (British Columbia) Patti Knezevic
- (Saskatchewan) Stefanie Lawton
- (Ontario) Carrie Lindner
- (British Columbia) Allison MacInnes
- (Ontario) Colleen Madonia
- (Alberta) Chana Martineau
- (Ontario) Krista McCarville
- (Saskatchewan) Jolene McIvor
- (Ontario) Sherry Middaugh
- (Alberta) Kristie Moore
- (Manitoba) Karen Porritt
- (Alberta) Karen Powell
- (Alberta) Heather Rankin
- (British Columbia) Kristen Recksiedler
- (Ontario) Julie Reddick
- (Manitoba) Darcy Robertson
- (Alberta) Deb Santos
- (Alberta) Renée Sonnenberg
- (Manitoba) Barb Spencer
- (Manitoba) Keliegh Strath
- (Manitoba) Shauna Streich
- (Newfoundland and Labrador) Heather Strong
- (Alberta) Crystal Webster
- (Alberta) Faye White
