= 2009 Quebec Men's Provincial Curling Championship =

- Host city: Salaberry-de-Valleyfield, Quebec
- Arena: Valleyfield Arena
- Dates: February 8–15
- Winner: Team Ménard
- Curling club: CC Victoria, Sainte-Foy, Quebec; CC Etchemin, Saint-Romuald, Quebec
- Skip: Jean-Michel Ménard
- Third: Martin Crête
- Second: Eric Sylvain
- Lead: Jean Gagnon
- Finalist: Martin Ferland

The 2009 Quebec Men's Provincial Curling Championship (Quebec men's provincial curling championship) was held February 8–15 at the Valleyfield Arena in Salaberry-de-Valleyfield, Quebec. The winning Jean-Michel Ménard team represented Quebec at the 2009 Tim Hortons Brier in Calgary.

== Teams ==
=== Group A ===
| Skip | Vice | Second | Lead | Alternate | Club |
|---|---|---|---|---|---|
| Daniel Bédard | Simon Lejour | Sylvain Lejour | Yannick Lejour | Dale Ness | Lacolle Curling Club |
| Marc-André Chartrand | Gabriel Saindon | Patrick Bédard | Daniel Bilodeau | | Club de curling Noranda, Rouyn-Noranda |
| Christian Crête | Denis Tremblay | Jonathan Tremblay | Jacques Deschênes | Réal Petitclerc | Club de curling Etchemin, Saint-Romuald; Club de curling Victoria, Sainte-Foy |
| Robert Desjardins | Jean-François Charest | Philippe Brassard | Alexandre Boivin | | Club de curling Chicoutimi |
| Guy Hemmings | Dwayne Fowler | Shawn Fowler | Maxime Elmaleh | François Roberge | Royal Montreal Curling Club, Montreal |
| Denis Laflamme | Bernard Gingras | Steve Tremblay | Alain Lapierre | Claude Gagnon | Club de curling de Sept-Îles |
| Jean-Michel Ménard | Martin Crête | Eric Sylvain | Jean Gagnon | | Club de curling Victoria, Sainte-Foy; Club de curling Etchemin, Saint-Romuald |
| Serge Reid | François Gionest | Simon Collin | Steve Villeneuve | | Club de curling Kenogami, Jonquière; Club de curling Riverbend, Alma; Club de curling Roberval; Club de curling Chicoutimi |
| Sébastien Robillard | Mark Homan | Laurent Lapierre | Jason Berger | Mike Kennedy | Club de curling Longue Pointe, Montreal; Pointe-Claire curling club Otterburn curling club, Otterburn Park |
| Jean-Pierre Venne | Benoit Gagné | Maxime Bilodeau | Olivier Beaulieu | Steve Gagnon | Club de curling Laval-sur-le-Lac; Club de curling Rosemère |

=== Group B ===
| Skip | Vice | Second | Lead | Alternate | Club |
|---|---|---|---|---|---|
| Ted Butler | Richard Faguy | Dany Beaulieu | Michel Laroche | | Buckingham Curling Club |
| Pierre Charette | Mathieu Beaufort | Frédéric Boulanger | Louis Biron | Simon Benoit | Thurso curling club |
| Simon Dupuis | Jean-Sébastien Roy | Yannick Martel | Maurice Cayouette | | Thurso curling club |
| Martin Ferland | Philippe Lemay | Marco Berthelot | Christian Cantin | | Laviolette curling club, Trois-Rivières |
| François Gagné | Steven Munroe | Christian Bouchard | Philippe Ménard | Jean-Michel Arsenault | TMR curling club, Ville Mont-Royal; Club de curling Etchemin, Saint-Romuald |
| Pierre Gervais | Jacques Boisvert | Jean-François Lemaire | Jean Thellend | | Laviolette & Trois-Rivières curling clubs, Trois-Rivières |
| Evan Mooney | Rémi Verville | Matt McCrea | Bradley Lassemba | Christopher Lodge | Lennoxville, Sherbrooke & North Hatley curling clubs |
| Martin Roy | Thierry Fournier | Carl Lambert | David Valliéres | Marco Robitaille | Glenmore curling club, Dollard-des-Ormeaux; TMR curling club, Mount Royal |
| John Stewart | Mario Faubert | Éric Archambault | Alain Caza | Guy Mathieu | Valleyfield curling club |
| Georges Tardif | Alain Leblond | Bernard St-Laurent | Yves Gagnon | Guillaume Beaulieu | Club de curling Rimouski |

== Standings ==
=== Group A ===
| Skip (club(s)) | W | L |
|---|---|---|
| Jean-Michel Ménard (Victoria, Etchemin) | 8 | 1 |
| Guy Hemmings (Royal Montreal) | 8 | 1 |
| Serge Reid (Kenogami, Riverbend, Roberval, Chicoutimi) | 6 | 3 |
| Daniel Bédard (Lacolle) | 6 | 3 |
| Marc-André Chartrand (Noranda) | 4 | 5 |
| Robert Desjardins (Chicoutimi) | 4 | 5 |
| Sébastien Robillard (Longue Pointe, Pointe Claire, Otterburn) | 3 | 6 |
| Christian Crête (Etchemin, Victoria) | 2 | 7 |
| Denis Laflamme (Sept-Iles) | 2 | 7 |
| Jean-Pierre Venne (Laval-sur-le-Lac, Rosemère) | 2 | 7 |

=== Group B ===
| Skip (club(s)) | W | L |
|---|---|---|
| Martin Ferland (Laviolette) | 8 | 1 |
| Pierre Charette (Thurso) | 6 | 3 |
| Martin Roy (Glenmore, TMR) | 5 | 4 |
| Simon Dupuis (Thurso) | 5 | 4 |
| Ted Butler (Buckingham) | 5 | 4 |
| François Gagné (TMR, Etchemin) | 5 | 4 |
| John Stewart (Valleyfield) | 4 | 5 |
| Georges Tardif (Rimouski) | 3 | 6 |
| Evan Mooney (Lennoxville, Sherbrooke, North Hatley) | 2 | 7 |
| Pierre Gervais (Laviolette, Trois-Rivières) | 2 | 7 |

== Results ==
=== Draw 1 ===
February 9, 0830

| Sheet A | 1 | 2 | 3 | 4 | 5 | 6 | 7 | 8 | 9 | 10 | Final |
|---|---|---|---|---|---|---|---|---|---|---|---|
| Sébastien Robillard 🔨 | 1 | 1 | 0 | 1 | 0 | 1 | 0 | 1 | X | X | 5 |
| Jean-Michel Ménard | 0 | 0 | 3 | 0 | 3 | 0 | 3 | 0 | X | X | 9 |

| Sheet B | 1 | 2 | 3 | 4 | 5 | 6 | 7 | 8 | 9 | 10 | Final |
|---|---|---|---|---|---|---|---|---|---|---|---|
| Marc-André Chartrand 🔨 | 1 | 0 | 0 | 0 | 0 | 1 | 1 | 0 | 0 | X | 3 |
| Daniel Bédard | 0 | 0 | 1 | 1 | 0 | 0 | 0 | 3 | 2 | X | 7 |

| Sheet C | 1 | 2 | 3 | 4 | 5 | 6 | 7 | 8 | 9 | 10 | Final |
|---|---|---|---|---|---|---|---|---|---|---|---|
| Guy Hemmings | 0 | 0 | 1 | 1 | 0 | 2 | 0 | 5 | 0 | 0 | 9 |
| Christian Crête 🔨 | 1 | 1 | 0 | 0 | 2 | 0 | 1 | 0 | 2 | 1 | 8 |

| Sheet D | 1 | 2 | 3 | 4 | 5 | 6 | 7 | 8 | 9 | 10 | Final |
|---|---|---|---|---|---|---|---|---|---|---|---|
| Robert Desjardins 🔨 | 4 | 2 | 1 | 0 | 0 | 0 | 2 | X | X | X | 9 |
| Denis Laflamme | 0 | 0 | 0 | 0 | 1 | 0 | 0 | X | X | X | 1 |

| Sheet E | 1 | 2 | 3 | 4 | 5 | 6 | 7 | 8 | 9 | 10 | Final |
|---|---|---|---|---|---|---|---|---|---|---|---|
| Jean-Pierre Venne 🔨 | 0 | 0 | 1 | 1 | 0 | 0 | 2 | 0 | 0 | 0 | 4 |
| Serge Reid | 0 | 0 | 0 | 0 | 2 | 1 | 0 | 1 | 0 | 3 | 7 |

=== Draw 2 ===
February 9, 1230

| Sheet A | 1 | 2 | 3 | 4 | 5 | 6 | 7 | 8 | 9 | 10 | Final |
|---|---|---|---|---|---|---|---|---|---|---|---|
| Pierre Gervais | 0 | 1 | 0 | 0 | 0 | 1 | 0 | X | X | X | 2 |
| Martin Ferland 🔨 | 1 | 0 | 1 | 1 | 1 | 0 | 4 | X | X | X | 8 |

| Sheet B | 1 | 2 | 3 | 4 | 5 | 6 | 7 | 8 | 9 | 10 | Final |
|---|---|---|---|---|---|---|---|---|---|---|---|
| John Stewart | 0 | 1 | 0 | 2 | 2 | 0 | 0 | 0 | 0 | X | 5 |
| Pierre Charette 🔨 | 2 | 0 | 3 | 0 | 0 | 1 | 1 | 0 | 1 | X | 8 |

| Sheet C | 1 | 2 | 3 | 4 | 5 | 6 | 7 | 8 | 9 | 10 | 11 | Final |
|---|---|---|---|---|---|---|---|---|---|---|---|---|
| Simon Dupuis 🔨 | 0 | 1 | 0 | 1 | 0 | 0 | 0 | 2 | 0 | 1 | 2 | 7 |
| Georges Tardif | 0 | 0 | 2 | 0 | 0 | 1 | 0 | 0 | 2 | 0 | 0 | 5 |

| Sheet D | 1 | 2 | 3 | 4 | 5 | 6 | 7 | 8 | 9 | 10 | Final |
|---|---|---|---|---|---|---|---|---|---|---|---|
| François Gagné 🔨 | 0 | 0 | 2 | 0 | 0 | 0 | 1 | 0 | 0 | 0 | 3 |
| Evan Mooney | 0 | 0 | 0 | 0 | 1 | 0 | 0 | 1 | 0 | 0 | 2 |

| Sheet E | 1 | 2 | 3 | 4 | 5 | 6 | 7 | 8 | 9 | 10 | Final |
|---|---|---|---|---|---|---|---|---|---|---|---|
| Martin Roy 🔨 | 0 | 0 | 2 | 0 | 0 | 0 | 0 | 0 | X | X | 2 |
| Ted Butler | 0 | 0 | 0 | 1 | 1 | 3 | 1 | 1 | X | X | 7 |

=== Draw 3 ===
February 9, 1630

| Sheet A | 1 | 2 | 3 | 4 | 5 | 6 | 7 | 8 | 9 | 10 | Final |
|---|---|---|---|---|---|---|---|---|---|---|---|
| Serge Reid 🔨 | 1 | 0 | 3 | 0 | 3 | 0 | 0 | 1 | 0 | 0 | 8 |
| Christian Crête | 0 | 1 | 0 | 1 | 0 | 2 | 1 | 0 | 1 | 1 | 7 |

| Sheet B | 1 | 2 | 3 | 4 | 5 | 6 | 7 | 8 | 9 | 10 | Final |
|---|---|---|---|---|---|---|---|---|---|---|---|
| Jean-Pierre Venne 🔨 | 1 | 0 | 0 | 0 | 0 | 0 | X | X | X | X | 1 |
| Jean-Michel Ménard | 0 | 0 | 0 | 2 | 4 | 1 | X | X | X | X | 7 |

| Sheet C | 1 | 2 | 3 | 4 | 5 | 6 | 7 | 8 | 9 | 10 | Final |
|---|---|---|---|---|---|---|---|---|---|---|---|
| Sébastien Robillard | 0 | 1 | 0 | 0 | 3 | 0 | 1 | 1 | 2 | X | 8 |
| Denis Laflamme 🔨 | 1 | 0 | 1 | 0 | 0 | 1 | 0 | 0 | 0 | X | 3 |

| Sheet D | 1 | 2 | 3 | 4 | 5 | 6 | 7 | 8 | 9 | 10 | Final |
|---|---|---|---|---|---|---|---|---|---|---|---|
| Guy Hemmings | 1 | 0 | 0 | 4 | 1 | 0 | 2 | X | X | X | 8 |
| Marc-André Chartrand 🔨 | 0 | 0 | 1 | 0 | 0 | 1 | 0 | X | X | X | 2 |

| Sheet E | 1 | 2 | 3 | 4 | 5 | 6 | 7 | 8 | 9 | 10 | Final |
|---|---|---|---|---|---|---|---|---|---|---|---|
| Robert Desjardins 🔨 | 2 | 0 | 3 | 0 | 0 | 1 | 0 | 1 | X | X | 7 |
| Daniel Bédard | 0 | 1 | 0 | 1 | 1 | 0 | 0 | 0 | X | X | 3 |

=== Draw 4 ===
February 9, 2100

| Sheet A | 1 | 2 | 3 | 4 | 5 | 6 | 7 | 8 | 9 | 10 | 11 | Final |
|---|---|---|---|---|---|---|---|---|---|---|---|---|
| Ted Butler 🔨 | 0 | 0 | 1 | 0 | 2 | 0 | 0 | 2 | 0 | 0 | 0 | 5 |
| Georges Tardif | 1 | 0 | 0 | 1 | 0 | 1 | 0 | 0 | 1 | 1 | 1 | 6 |

| Sheet B | 1 | 2 | 3 | 4 | 5 | 6 | 7 | 8 | 9 | 10 | Final |
|---|---|---|---|---|---|---|---|---|---|---|---|
| Martin Roy | 0 | 1 | 0 | 0 | 1 | 0 | 1 | 0 | X | X | 3 |
| Martin Ferland 🔨 | 2 | 0 | 2 | 1 | 0 | 2 | 0 | 2 | X | X | 9 |

| Sheet C | 1 | 2 | 3 | 4 | 5 | 6 | 7 | 8 | 9 | 10 | Final |
|---|---|---|---|---|---|---|---|---|---|---|---|
| Pierre Gervais | 0 | 0 | 1 | 2 | 1 | 0 | 0 | 0 | 3 | 0 | 7 |
| Evan Mooney 🔨 | 2 | 2 | 0 | 0 | 0 | 3 | 0 | 1 | 0 | 0 | 8 |

| Sheet D | 1 | 2 | 3 | 4 | 5 | 6 | 7 | 8 | 9 | 10 | 11 | Final |
|---|---|---|---|---|---|---|---|---|---|---|---|---|
| Simon Dupuis 🔨 | 2 | 1 | 0 | 2 | 0 | 1 | 0 | 2 | 0 | 1 | 0 | 9 |
| John Stewart | 0 | 0 | 1 | 0 | 3 | 0 | 1 | 0 | 4 | 0 | 1 | 10 |

| Sheet E | 1 | 2 | 3 | 4 | 5 | 6 | 7 | 8 | 9 | 10 | Final |
|---|---|---|---|---|---|---|---|---|---|---|---|
| François Gagné 🔨 | 2 | 0 | 4 | 2 | 0 | 1 | X | X | X | X | 9 |
| Pierre Charette | 0 | 2 | 0 | 0 | 1 | 0 | X | X | X | X | 3 |

=== Draw 5 ===
February 10, 0830

| Sheet A | 1 | 2 | 3 | 4 | 5 | 6 | 7 | 8 | 9 | 10 | Final |
|---|---|---|---|---|---|---|---|---|---|---|---|
| Jean-Michel Ménard | 0 | 1 | 1 | 1 | 1 | 0 | 4 | X | X | X | 8 |
| Denis Laflamme 🔨 | 1 | 0 | 0 | 0 | 0 | 1 | 0 | X | X | X | 2 |

| Sheet B | 1 | 2 | 3 | 4 | 5 | 6 | 7 | 8 | 9 | 10 | Final |
|---|---|---|---|---|---|---|---|---|---|---|---|
| Robert Desjardins | 1 | 0 | 2 | 0 | 1 | 0 | 0 | 1 | 0 | 0 | 5 |
| Marc-André Chartrand 🔨 | 0 | 1 | 0 | 1 | 0 | 1 | 0 | 0 | 2 | 1 | 6 |

| Sheet C | 1 | 2 | 3 | 4 | 5 | 6 | 7 | 8 | 9 | 10 | 11 | Final |
|---|---|---|---|---|---|---|---|---|---|---|---|---|
| Christian Crête | 0 | 4 | 0 | 2 | 1 | 0 | 0 | 2 | 0 | 0 | 1 | 10 |
| Sébastien Robillard 🔨 | 1 | 0 | 1 | 0 | 0 | 3 | 1 | 0 | 1 | 2 | 0 | 9 |

| Sheet D | 1 | 2 | 3 | 4 | 5 | 6 | 7 | 8 | 9 | 10 | 11 | Final |
|---|---|---|---|---|---|---|---|---|---|---|---|---|
| Daniel Bédard | 1 | 0 | 0 | 0 | 2 | 1 | 0 | 1 | 0 | 1 | 1 | 7 |
| Serge Reid 🔨 | 0 | 2 | 1 | 2 | 0 | 0 | 0 | 0 | 1 | 0 | 0 | 6 |

| Sheet E | 1 | 2 | 3 | 4 | 5 | 6 | 7 | 8 | 9 | 10 | Final |
|---|---|---|---|---|---|---|---|---|---|---|---|
| Guy Hemmings 🔨 | 0 | 1 | 0 | 0 | 0 | 3 | 0 | 2 | 0 | X | 6 |
| Jean-Pierre Venne | 0 | 0 | 0 | 0 | 1 | 0 | 1 | 0 | 1 | X | 3 |

=== Draw 6 ===
February 10, 1230

| Sheet A | 1 | 2 | 3 | 4 | 5 | 6 | 7 | 8 | 9 | 10 | Final |
|---|---|---|---|---|---|---|---|---|---|---|---|
| Martin Ferland 🔨 | 0 | 1 | 0 | 2 | 1 | 0 | 0 | 1 | 2 | X | 7 |
| Evan Mooney | 0 | 0 | 1 | 0 | 0 | 1 | 1 | 0 | 0 | X | 3 |

| Sheet B | 1 | 2 | 3 | 4 | 5 | 6 | 7 | 8 | 9 | 10 | Final |
|---|---|---|---|---|---|---|---|---|---|---|---|
| François Gagné | 0 | 2 | 0 | 0 | 0 | 1 | 0 | 0 | 3 | 0 | 6 |
| John Stewart 🔨 | 1 | 0 | 3 | 0 | 1 | 0 | 2 | 0 | 0 | 1 | 8 |

| Sheet C | 1 | 2 | 3 | 4 | 5 | 6 | 7 | 8 | 9 | 10 | Final |
|---|---|---|---|---|---|---|---|---|---|---|---|
| Georges Tardif | 0 | 2 | 1 | 1 | 0 | 0 | 1 | 0 | X | X | 5 |
| Pierre Gervais 🔨 | 2 | 0 | 0 | 0 | 3 | 3 | 0 | 4 | X | X | 12 |

| Sheet D | 1 | 2 | 3 | 4 | 5 | 6 | 7 | 8 | 9 | 10 | Final |
|---|---|---|---|---|---|---|---|---|---|---|---|
| Pierre Charette | 0 | 2 | 0 | 0 | 1 | 1 | 0 | 2 | 1 | 1 | 8 |
| Ted Butler 🔨 | 1 | 0 | 1 | 1 | 0 | 0 | 4 | 0 | 0 | 0 | 7 |

| Sheet E | 1 | 2 | 3 | 4 | 5 | 6 | 7 | 8 | 9 | 10 | Final |
|---|---|---|---|---|---|---|---|---|---|---|---|
| Simon Dupuis 🔨 | 2 | 0 | 1 | 0 | 1 | 0 | 0 | 1 | 0 | 2 | 7 |
| Martin Roy | 0 | 1 | 0 | 1 | 0 | 2 | 0 | 0 | 1 | 0 | 5 |

=== Draw 7 ===
February 10, 1630

| Sheet A | 1 | 2 | 3 | 4 | 5 | 6 | 7 | 8 | 9 | 10 | Final |
|---|---|---|---|---|---|---|---|---|---|---|---|
| Guy Hemmings | 1 | 1 | 0 | 2 | 0 | 2 | 0 | 2 | 1 | X | 9 |
| Daniel Bédard 🔨 | 0 | 0 | 2 | 0 | 2 | 0 | 0 | 0 | 0 | X | 4 |

| Sheet B | 1 | 2 | 3 | 4 | 5 | 6 | 7 | 8 | 9 | 10 | Final |
|---|---|---|---|---|---|---|---|---|---|---|---|
| Serge Reid 🔨 | 1 | 0 | 2 | 0 | 0 | 2 | 4 | X | X | X | 9 |
| Sébastien Robillard | 0 | 1 | 0 | 3 | 0 | 0 | 0 | X | X | X | 4 |

| Sheet C | 1 | 2 | 3 | 4 | 5 | 6 | 7 | 8 | 9 | 10 | Final |
|---|---|---|---|---|---|---|---|---|---|---|---|
| Marc-André Chartrand | 0 | 0 | 2 | 1 | 0 | X | X | X | X | X | 3 |
| Jean-Michel Ménard 🔨 | 4 | 1 | 0 | 0 | 3 | X | X | X | X | X | 8 |

| Sheet D | 1 | 2 | 3 | 4 | 5 | 6 | 7 | 8 | 9 | 10 | Final |
|---|---|---|---|---|---|---|---|---|---|---|---|
| Denis Laflamme 🔨 | 2 | 0 | 2 | 0 | 1 | 0 | 0 | 1 | 0 | 2 | 8 |
| Jean-Pierre Venne | 0 | 1 | 0 | 1 | 0 | 2 | 1 | 0 | 1 | 0 | 6 |

| Sheet E | 1 | 2 | 3 | 4 | 5 | 6 | 7 | 8 | 9 | 10 | Final |
|---|---|---|---|---|---|---|---|---|---|---|---|
| Christian Crête | 1 | 0 | 1 | 0 | 0 | 1 | X | X | X | X | 3 |
| Robert Desjardins 🔨 | 0 | 3 | 0 | 1 | 2 | 0 | X | X | X | X | 6 |

=== Draw 8 ===
February 10, 2030

| Sheet A | 1 | 2 | 3 | 4 | 5 | 6 | 7 | 8 | 9 | 10 | Final |
|---|---|---|---|---|---|---|---|---|---|---|---|
| Simon Dupuis 🔨 | 0 | 0 | 1 | 0 | 2 | 0 | 1 | 1 | 0 | X | 5 |
| Pierre Charette | 0 | 2 | 0 | 2 | 0 | 3 | 0 | 0 | 1 | X | 8 |

| Sheet B | 1 | 2 | 3 | 4 | 5 | 6 | 7 | 8 | 9 | 10 | 11 | Final |
|---|---|---|---|---|---|---|---|---|---|---|---|---|
| Ted Butler | 0 | 1 | 0 | 0 | 2 | 0 | 2 | 1 | 2 | 0 | 3 | 11 |
| Pierre Gervais 🔨 | 2 | 0 | 3 | 1 | 0 | 0 | 0 | 0 | 0 | 2 | 0 | 8 |

| Sheet C | 1 | 2 | 3 | 4 | 5 | 6 | 7 | 8 | 9 | 10 | Final |
|---|---|---|---|---|---|---|---|---|---|---|---|
| John Stewart | 0 | 1 | 0 | 1 | 0 | 0 | 0 | 1 | 1 | 0 | 4 |
| Martin Ferland 🔨 | 1 | 0 | 1 | 0 | 1 | 0 | 0 | 0 | 0 | 2 | 5 |

| Sheet D | 1 | 2 | 3 | 4 | 5 | 6 | 7 | 8 | 9 | 10 | Final |
|---|---|---|---|---|---|---|---|---|---|---|---|
| Evan Mooney | 0 | 2 | 0 | 1 | 0 | 1 | 0 | 2 | X | X | 6 |
| Martin Roy 🔨 | 2 | 0 | 2 | 0 | 2 | 0 | 1 | 0 | X | X | 7 |

| Sheet E | 1 | 2 | 3 | 4 | 5 | 6 | 7 | 8 | 9 | 10 | Final |
|---|---|---|---|---|---|---|---|---|---|---|---|
| Georges Tardif 🔨 | 1 | 0 | 0 | 2 | 0 | 0 | 0 | 1 | 0 | X | 4 |
| François Gagné | 0 | 2 | 1 | 0 | 0 | 0 | 3 | 0 | 2 | X | 8 |

=== Draw 9 ===
February 11, 0830

| Sheet A | 1 | 2 | 3 | 4 | 5 | 6 | 7 | 8 | 9 | 10 | 11 | Final |
|---|---|---|---|---|---|---|---|---|---|---|---|---|
| Martin Roy | 3 | 0 | 0 | 1 | 0 | 2 | 0 | 4 | 0 | 0 | 1 | 11 |
| François Gagné 🔨 | 0 | 4 | 1 | 0 | 2 | 0 | 1 | 0 | 1 | 1 | 0 | 10 |

| Sheet B | 1 | 2 | 3 | 4 | 5 | 6 | 7 | 8 | 9 | 10 | Final |
|---|---|---|---|---|---|---|---|---|---|---|---|
| Georges Tardif | 0 | 1 | 0 | 0 | 2 | 2 | 3 | X | X | X | 8 |
| Evan Mooney 🔨 | 1 | 0 | 0 | 1 | 0 | 0 | 0 | X | X | X | 2 |

| Sheet C | 1 | 2 | 3 | 4 | 5 | 6 | 7 | 8 | 9 | 10 | Final |
|---|---|---|---|---|---|---|---|---|---|---|---|
| Ted Butler | 0 | 2 | 0 | 1 | 0 | 2 | 0 | 1 | 0 | 1 | 7 |
| John Stewart 🔨 | 2 | 0 | 1 | 0 | 1 | 0 | 1 | 0 | 1 | 0 | 6 |

| Sheet D | 1 | 2 | 3 | 4 | 5 | 6 | 7 | 8 | 9 | 10 | Final |
|---|---|---|---|---|---|---|---|---|---|---|---|
| Martin Ferland 🔨 | 0 | 0 | 0 | 0 | 0 | 2 | 0 | 2 | 0 | 0 | 4 |
| Pierre Charette | 0 | 0 | 0 | 1 | 0 | 0 | 1 | 0 | 1 | 0 | 3 |

| Sheet E | 1 | 2 | 3 | 4 | 5 | 6 | 7 | 8 | 9 | 10 | Final |
|---|---|---|---|---|---|---|---|---|---|---|---|
| Pierre Gervais | 1 | 0 | 0 | 1 | 0 | 0 | 1 | 0 | X | X | 3 |
| Simon Dupuis 🔨 | 0 | 1 | 4 | 0 | 0 | 3 | 0 | 4 | X | X | 12 |

=== Draw 10 ===
February 11, 1230

| Sheet A | 1 | 2 | 3 | 4 | 5 | 6 | 7 | 8 | 9 | 10 | Final |
|---|---|---|---|---|---|---|---|---|---|---|---|
| Denis Laflamme 🔨 | 1 | 1 | 0 | 0 | 1 | 0 | 0 | 3 | 0 | 1 | 7 |
| Serge Reid | 0 | 0 | 1 | 1 | 0 | 1 | 1 | 0 | 1 | 0 | 5 |

| Sheet B | 1 | 2 | 3 | 4 | 5 | 6 | 7 | 8 | 9 | 10 | Final |
|---|---|---|---|---|---|---|---|---|---|---|---|
| Guy Hemmings 🔨 | 1 | 1 | 0 | 1 | 0 | 0 | 2 | 0 | 0 | 3 | 8 |
| Robert Desjardins | 0 | 0 | 1 | 0 | 2 | 2 | 0 | 2 | 0 | 0 | 7 |

| Sheet C | 1 | 2 | 3 | 4 | 5 | 6 | 7 | 8 | 9 | 10 | Final |
|---|---|---|---|---|---|---|---|---|---|---|---|
| Jean-Pierre Venne 🔨 | 1 | 1 | 0 | 0 | 1 | 0 | 0 | 0 | 1 | 0 | 4 |
| Daniel Bédard | 0 | 0 | 1 | 1 | 0 | 0 | 2 | 1 | 0 | 1 | 6 |

| Sheet D | 1 | 2 | 3 | 4 | 5 | 6 | 7 | 8 | 9 | 10 | Final |
|---|---|---|---|---|---|---|---|---|---|---|---|
| Christian Crête 🔨 | 2 | 0 | 2 | 0 | 0 | 2 | 0 | 1 | 0 | 0 | 7 |
| Jean-Michel Ménard | 0 | 2 | 0 | 2 | 1 | 0 | 2 | 0 | 0 | 1 | 8 |

| Sheet E | 1 | 2 | 3 | 4 | 5 | 6 | 7 | 8 | 9 | 10 | Final |
|---|---|---|---|---|---|---|---|---|---|---|---|
| Marc-André Chartrand | 0 | 0 | 1 | 0 | 2 | 0 | 1 | 0 | 0 | X | 4 |
| Sébastien Robillard 🔨 | 0 | 1 | 0 | 4 | 0 | 1 | 0 | 2 | 0 | X | 8 |

=== Draw 11 ===
February 11, 1630

| Sheet A | 1 | 2 | 3 | 4 | 5 | 6 | 7 | 8 | 9 | 10 | Final |
|---|---|---|---|---|---|---|---|---|---|---|---|
| Georges Tardif 🔨 | 2 | 0 | 1 | 0 | 0 | 2 | 0 | 3 | X | X | 8 |
| John Stewart | 0 | 1 | 0 | 1 | 0 | 0 | 1 | 0 | X | X | 3 |

| Sheet B | 1 | 2 | 3 | 4 | 5 | 6 | 7 | 8 | 9 | 10 | Final |
|---|---|---|---|---|---|---|---|---|---|---|---|
| Pierre Gervais | 0 | 0 | 1 | 0 | 1 | 0 | 1 | X | X | X | 3 |
| Martin Roy 🔨 | 3 | 0 | 0 | 2 | 0 | 3 | 0 | X | X | X | 8 |

| Sheet C | 1 | 2 | 3 | 4 | 5 | 6 | 7 | 8 | 9 | 10 | Final |
|---|---|---|---|---|---|---|---|---|---|---|---|
| Martin Ferland 🔨 | 0 | 4 | 0 | 1 | 0 | 0 | 1 | 0 | 2 | 0 | 8 |
| François Gagné | 1 | 0 | 2 | 0 | 0 | 3 | 0 | 1 | 0 | 3 | 10 |

| Sheet D | 1 | 2 | 3 | 4 | 5 | 6 | 7 | 8 | 9 | 10 | Final |
|---|---|---|---|---|---|---|---|---|---|---|---|
| Ted Butler 🔨 | 1 | 0 | 0 | 0 | 2 | 0 | 0 | 1 | 0 | X | 4 |
| Simon Dupuis | 0 | 1 | 1 | 0 | 0 | 3 | 1 | 0 | 2 | X | 8 |

| Sheet E | 1 | 2 | 3 | 4 | 5 | 6 | 7 | 8 | 9 | 10 | Final |
|---|---|---|---|---|---|---|---|---|---|---|---|
| Pierre Charette 🔨 | 2 | 0 | 1 | 2 | 1 | 0 | 2 | 0 | 0 | 1 | 9 |
| Evan Mooney | 0 | 1 | 0 | 0 | 0 | 2 | 0 | 0 | 3 | 0 | 6 |

=== Draw 12 ===
February 11, 2030

| Sheet A | 1 | 2 | 3 | 4 | 5 | 6 | 7 | 8 | 9 | 10 | Final |
|---|---|---|---|---|---|---|---|---|---|---|---|
| Christian Crête | 1 | 0 | 0 | 1 | 0 | 0 | 0 | X | X | X | 2 |
| Marc-André Chartrand 🔨 | 0 | 1 | 0 | 0 | 4 | 1 | 1 | X | X | X | 7 |

| Sheet B | 1 | 2 | 3 | 4 | 5 | 6 | 7 | 8 | 9 | 10 | Final |
|---|---|---|---|---|---|---|---|---|---|---|---|
| Sébastien Robillard 🔨 | 2 | 1 | 0 | 3 | 0 | 0 | 1 | 0 | 2 | X | 9 |
| Jean-Pierre Venne | 0 | 0 | 1 | 0 | 2 | 1 | 0 | 2 | 0 | X | 6 |

| Sheet C | 1 | 2 | 3 | 4 | 5 | 6 | 7 | 8 | 9 | 10 | Final |
|---|---|---|---|---|---|---|---|---|---|---|---|
| Jean-Michel Ménard | 0 | 1 | 1 | 0 | 0 | 2 | 2 | 0 | 1 | X | 7 |
| Robert Desjardins 🔨 | 1 | 0 | 0 | 0 | 1 | 0 | 0 | 1 | 0 | X | 3 |

| Sheet D | 1 | 2 | 3 | 4 | 5 | 6 | 7 | 8 | 9 | 10 | Final |
|---|---|---|---|---|---|---|---|---|---|---|---|
| Serge Reid | 0 | 1 | 0 | 2 | 0 | 2 | 0 | 1 | 0 | 0 | 6 |
| Guy Hemmings 🔨 | 1 | 0 | 1 | 0 | 1 | 0 | 1 | 0 | 2 | 1 | 7 |

| Sheet E | 1 | 2 | 3 | 4 | 5 | 6 | 7 | 8 | 9 | 10 | Final |
|---|---|---|---|---|---|---|---|---|---|---|---|
| Daniel Bédard 🔨 | 2 | 0 | 0 | 1 | 0 | 1 | 1 | 1 | 0 | X | 6 |
| Denis Laflamme | 0 | 0 | 2 | 0 | 1 | 0 | 0 | 0 | 0 | X | 3 |

=== Draw 13 ===
February 12, 0830

| Sheet A | 1 | 2 | 3 | 4 | 5 | 6 | 7 | 8 | 9 | 10 | Final |
|---|---|---|---|---|---|---|---|---|---|---|---|
| Evan Mooney 🔨 | 0 | 0 | 3 | 0 | 1 | 1 | 0 | 2 | 1 | 0 | 8 |
| Ted Butler | 0 | 0 | 0 | 2 | 0 | 0 | 5 | 0 | 0 | 2 | 9 |

| Sheet B | 1 | 2 | 3 | 4 | 5 | 6 | 7 | 8 | 9 | 10 | 11 | Final |
|---|---|---|---|---|---|---|---|---|---|---|---|---|
| Simon Dupuis 🔨 | 1 | 0 | 0 | 0 | 0 | 1 | 0 | 1 | 0 | 3 | 0 | 6 |
| François Gagné | 0 | 1 | 1 | 1 | 1 | 0 | 0 | 0 | 2 | 0 | 1 | 7 |

| Sheet C | 1 | 2 | 3 | 4 | 5 | 6 | 7 | 8 | 9 | 10 | Final |
|---|---|---|---|---|---|---|---|---|---|---|---|
| Martin Roy 🔨 | 1 | 0 | 1 | 0 | 1 | 1 | 0 | 1 | 0 | 2 | 7 |
| Pierre Charette | 0 | 1 | 0 | 2 | 0 | 0 | 1 | 0 | 2 | 0 | 6 |

| Sheet D | 1 | 2 | 3 | 4 | 5 | 6 | 7 | 8 | 9 | 10 | Final |
|---|---|---|---|---|---|---|---|---|---|---|---|
| Georges Tardif | 0 | 0 | 0 | 1 | 0 | 0 | 1 | 0 | 1 | X | 3 |
| Martin Ferland 🔨 | 0 | 0 | 2 | 0 | 2 | 0 | 0 | 2 | 0 | X | 6 |

| Sheet E | 1 | 2 | 3 | 4 | 5 | 6 | 7 | 8 | 9 | 10 | Final |
|---|---|---|---|---|---|---|---|---|---|---|---|
| John Stewart | 1 | 1 | 0 | 0 | 4 | 0 | 1 | 0 | X | X | 7 |
| Pierre Gervais 🔨 | 0 | 0 | 1 | 0 | 0 | 1 | 0 | 1 | X | X | 3 |

=== Draw 14 ===
February 12, 1230

| Sheet A | 1 | 2 | 3 | 4 | 5 | 6 | 7 | 8 | 9 | 10 | Final |
|---|---|---|---|---|---|---|---|---|---|---|---|
| Marc-André Chartrand 🔨 | 0 | 1 | 1 | 0 | 1 | 0 | 2 | 0 | 0 | 2 | 7 |
| Jean-Pierre Venne | 0 | 0 | 0 | 1 | 0 | 1 | 0 | 1 | 2 | 0 | 5 |

| Sheet B | 1 | 2 | 3 | 4 | 5 | 6 | 7 | 8 | 9 | 10 | Final |
|---|---|---|---|---|---|---|---|---|---|---|---|
| Daniel Bédard 🔨 | 1 | 0 | 1 | 0 | 2 | 0 | 2 | 1 | 0 | X | 7 |
| Christian Crête | 0 | 1 | 0 | 1 | 0 | 2 | 0 | 0 | 0 | X | 4 |

| Sheet C | 1 | 2 | 3 | 4 | 5 | 6 | 7 | 8 | 9 | 10 | Final |
|---|---|---|---|---|---|---|---|---|---|---|---|
| Denis Laflamme | 0 | 1 | 0 | 0 | 1 | 1 | 0 | 0 | 2 | 0 | 5 |
| Guy Hemmings 🔨 | 1 | 0 | 1 | 1 | 0 | 0 | 2 | 1 | 0 | 1 | 7 |

| Sheet D | 1 | 2 | 3 | 4 | 5 | 6 | 7 | 8 | 9 | 10 | Final |
|---|---|---|---|---|---|---|---|---|---|---|---|
| Sébastien Robillard | 0 | 2 | 0 | 0 | 0 | 2 | 1 | 0 | 1 | 0 | 6 |
| Robert Desjardins 🔨 | 1 | 0 | 1 | 1 | 1 | 0 | 0 | 1 | 0 | 5 | 10 |

| Sheet E | 1 | 2 | 3 | 4 | 5 | 6 | 7 | 8 | 9 | 10 | Final |
|---|---|---|---|---|---|---|---|---|---|---|---|
| Serge Reid 🔨 | 0 | 1 | 1 | 0 | 2 | 1 | 0 | 0 | 3 | X | 8 |
| Jean-Michel Ménard | 0 | 0 | 0 | 3 | 0 | 0 | 2 | 0 | 0 | X | 5 |

=== Draw 15 ===
February 12, 1630

| Sheet A | 1 | 2 | 3 | 4 | 5 | 6 | 7 | 8 | 9 | 10 | Final |
|---|---|---|---|---|---|---|---|---|---|---|---|
| John Stewart | 1 | 0 | 1 | 3 | 0 | 1 | 0 | 1 | 0 | 3 | 10 |
| Martin Roy 🔨 | 0 | 2 | 0 | 0 | 1 | 0 | 2 | 0 | 4 | 0 | 9 |

| Sheet B | 1 | 2 | 3 | 4 | 5 | 6 | 7 | 8 | 9 | 10 | Final |
|---|---|---|---|---|---|---|---|---|---|---|---|
| Pierre Charette 🔨 | 1 | 0 | 1 | 0 | 2 | 0 | 2 | 2 | X | X | 8 |
| Georges Tardif | 0 | 0 | 0 | 1 | 0 | 2 | 0 | 0 | X | X | 3 |

| Sheet C | 1 | 2 | 3 | 4 | 5 | 6 | 7 | 8 | 9 | 10 | 11 | Final |
|---|---|---|---|---|---|---|---|---|---|---|---|---|
| Evan Mooney | 2 | 0 | 3 | 0 | 2 | 0 | 1 | 0 | 0 | 1 | 0 | 9 |
| Simon Dupuis 🔨 | 0 | 1 | 0 | 2 | 0 | 2 | 0 | 3 | 1 | 0 | 1 | 10 |

| Sheet D | 1 | 2 | 3 | 4 | 5 | 6 | 7 | 8 | 9 | 10 | Final |
|---|---|---|---|---|---|---|---|---|---|---|---|
| Pierre Gervais 🔨 | 1 | 0 | 1 | 0 | 1 | 0 | 0 | 1 | 1 | 1 | 6 |
| François Gagné | 0 | 1 | 0 | 2 | 0 | 0 | 1 | 0 | 0 | 0 | 4 |

| Sheet E | 1 | 2 | 3 | 4 | 5 | 6 | 7 | 8 | 9 | 10 | Final |
|---|---|---|---|---|---|---|---|---|---|---|---|
| Ted Butler 🔨 | 1 | 0 | 0 | 0 | 1 | 0 | 1 | 0 | 0 | X | 3 |
| Martin Ferland | 0 | 2 | 0 | 0 | 0 | 2 | 0 | 2 | 2 | X | 8 |

=== Draw 16 ===
February 12, 2030

| Sheet A | 1 | 2 | 3 | 4 | 5 | 6 | 7 | 8 | 9 | 10 | Final |
|---|---|---|---|---|---|---|---|---|---|---|---|
| Daniel Bédard | 0 | 0 | 0 | 4 | 0 | 2 | 0 | 2 | 0 | 1 | 9 |
| Sébastien Robillard 🔨 | 1 | 1 | 1 | 0 | 2 | 0 | 1 | 0 | 2 | 0 | 8 |

| Sheet B | 1 | 2 | 3 | 4 | 5 | 6 | 7 | 8 | 9 | 10 | Final |
|---|---|---|---|---|---|---|---|---|---|---|---|
| Jean-Michel Ménard 🔨 | 2 | 0 | 0 | 0 | 0 | 1 | 0 | 1 | 0 | 1 | 5 |
| Guy Hemmings | 0 | 0 | 0 | 0 | 0 | 0 | 2 | 0 | 1 | 0 | 3 |

| Sheet C | 1 | 2 | 3 | 4 | 5 | 6 | 7 | 8 | 9 | 10 | Final |
|---|---|---|---|---|---|---|---|---|---|---|---|
| Robert Desjardins 🔨 | 2 | 0 | 0 | 3 | 0 | 0 | 0 | 0 | 1 | 0 | 6 |
| Serge Reid | 0 | 1 | 1 | 0 | 2 | 2 | 1 | 1 | 0 | 1 | 9 |

| Sheet D | 1 | 2 | 3 | 4 | 5 | 6 | 7 | 8 | 9 | 10 | Final |
|---|---|---|---|---|---|---|---|---|---|---|---|
| Jean-Pierre Venne 🔨 | 0 | 3 | 3 | 2 | 1 | X | X | X | X | X | 9 |
| Christian Crête | 1 | 0 | 0 | 0 | 0 | X | X | X | X | X | 1 |

| Sheet E | 1 | 2 | 3 | 4 | 5 | 6 | 7 | 8 | 9 | 10 | Final |
|---|---|---|---|---|---|---|---|---|---|---|---|
| Denis Laflamme | 0 | 1 | 1 | 0 | 0 | 0 | 0 | 1 | 0 | X | 3 |
| Marc-André Chartrand 🔨 | 2 | 0 | 0 | 0 | 1 | 1 | 0 | 0 | 1 | X | 5 |

=== Draw 17 ===
February 13, 0830

| Sheet A | 1 | 2 | 3 | 4 | 5 | 6 | 7 | 8 | 9 | 10 | Final |
|---|---|---|---|---|---|---|---|---|---|---|---|
| Jean-Pierre Venne | 0 | 2 | 0 | 0 | 0 | 0 | 3 | 0 | 1 | 1 | 7 |
| Robert Desjardins 🔨 | 1 | 0 | 1 | 1 | 1 | 0 | 0 | 1 | 0 | 0 | 5 |

| Sheet B | 1 | 2 | 3 | 4 | 5 | 6 | 7 | 8 | 9 | 10 | Final |
|---|---|---|---|---|---|---|---|---|---|---|---|
| Christian Crête | 1 | 0 | 2 | 1 | 0 | 2 | 0 | 3 | X | X | 9 |
| Denis Laflamme 🔨 | 0 | 1 | 0 | 0 | 1 | 0 | 1 | 0 | X | X | 3 |

| Sheet C | 1 | 2 | 3 | 4 | 5 | 6 | 7 | 8 | 9 | 10 | Final |
|---|---|---|---|---|---|---|---|---|---|---|---|
| Serge Reid 🔨 | 3 | 1 | 0 | 0 | 5 | X | X | X | X | X | 9 |
| Marc-André Chartrand | 0 | 0 | 1 | 0 | 0 | X | X | X | X | X | 1 |

| Sheet D | 1 | 2 | 3 | 4 | 5 | 6 | 7 | 8 | 9 | 10 | Final |
|---|---|---|---|---|---|---|---|---|---|---|---|
| Jean-Michel Ménard | 0 | 0 | 2 | 0 | 2 | 0 | 0 | 1 | 2 | X | 7 |
| Daniel Bédard 🔨 | 0 | 2 | 0 | 1 | 0 | 1 | 0 | 0 | 0 | X | 4 |

| Sheet E | 1 | 2 | 3 | 4 | 5 | 6 | 7 | 8 | 9 | 10 | Final |
|---|---|---|---|---|---|---|---|---|---|---|---|
| Sébastien Robillard 🔨 | 0 | 0 | 2 | 0 | 0 | 0 | 1 | 0 | 1 | X | 4 |
| Guy Hemmings | 1 | 0 | 0 | 1 | 2 | 1 | 0 | 1 | 0 | X | 6 |

=== Draw 18 ===
February 13, 1230

| Sheet A | 1 | 2 | 3 | 4 | 5 | 6 | 7 | 8 | 9 | 10 | Final |
|---|---|---|---|---|---|---|---|---|---|---|---|
| Pierre Charette | 0 | 2 | 0 | 6 | 0 | 1 | 0 | 0 | 2 | X | 11 |
| Pierre Gervais 🔨 | 2 | 0 | 2 | 0 | 1 | 0 | 0 | 1 | 0 | X | 6 |

| Sheet B | 1 | 2 | 3 | 4 | 5 | 6 | 7 | 8 | 9 | 10 | 11 | Final |
|---|---|---|---|---|---|---|---|---|---|---|---|---|
| Martin Ferland 🔨 | 1 | 0 | 1 | 0 | 4 | 0 | 1 | 0 | 1 | 0 | 1 | 9 |
| Simon Dupuis | 0 | 3 | 0 | 0 | 0 | 1 | 0 | 2 | 0 | 2 | 0 | 8 |

| Sheet C | 1 | 2 | 3 | 4 | 5 | 6 | 7 | 8 | 9 | 10 | Final |
|---|---|---|---|---|---|---|---|---|---|---|---|
| François Gagné 🔨 | 0 | 1 | 1 | 0 | 1 | 0 | 1 | 0 | 1 | 0 | 5 |
| Ted Butler | 0 | 0 | 0 | 3 | 0 | 2 | 0 | 2 | 0 | 1 | 8 |

| Sheet D | 1 | 2 | 3 | 4 | 5 | 6 | 7 | 8 | 9 | 10 | Final |
|---|---|---|---|---|---|---|---|---|---|---|---|
| Martin Roy | 1 | 0 | 1 | 1 | 0 | 0 | 0 | 3 | 0 | 2 | 8 |
| Georges Tardif 🔨 | 0 | 1 | 0 | 0 | 1 | 1 | 1 | 0 | 1 | 0 | 5 |

| Sheet E | 1 | 2 | 3 | 4 | 5 | 6 | 7 | 8 | 9 | 10 | Final |
|---|---|---|---|---|---|---|---|---|---|---|---|
| Evan Mooney 🔨 | 2 | 0 | 0 | 0 | 1 | 0 | 1 | 1 | 0 | 1 | 6 |
| John Stewart | 0 | 0 | 1 | 0 | 0 | 1 | 0 | 0 | 2 | 0 | 4 |

=== Tiebreakers ===
February 13, 1930

| Sheet B | 1 | 2 | 3 | 4 | 5 | 6 | 7 | 8 | 9 | 10 | Final |
|---|---|---|---|---|---|---|---|---|---|---|---|
| Ted Butler 🔨 | 2 | 0 | 1 | 0 | 0 | 2 | 0 | 0 | X | X | 5 |
| Martin Roy | 0 | 2 | 0 | 1 | 1 | 0 | 0 | 2 | X | X | 6 |

| Sheet C | 1 | 2 | 3 | 4 | 5 | 6 | 7 | 8 | 9 | 10 | Final |
|---|---|---|---|---|---|---|---|---|---|---|---|
| Serge Reid 🔨 | 3 | 1 | 0 | 2 | 0 | 1 | X | X | X | X | 7 |
| Daniel Bédard | 0 | 0 | 1 | 0 | 1 | 0 | X | X | X | X | 2 |

| Sheet D | 1 | 2 | 3 | 4 | 5 | 6 | 7 | 8 | 9 | 10 | Final |
|---|---|---|---|---|---|---|---|---|---|---|---|
| Simon Dupuis | 1 | 0 | 2 | 0 | 0 | 4 | 0 | 2 | X | X | 9 |
| François Gagné 🔨 | 0 | 4 | 0 | 1 | 0 | 0 | 1 | 0 | X | X | 6 |

February 14, 0900

| Sheet A | 1 | 2 | 3 | 4 | 5 | 6 | 7 | 8 | 9 | 10 | Final |
|---|---|---|---|---|---|---|---|---|---|---|---|
| Martin Roy 🔨 | 1 | 1 | 0 | 0 | 0 | 1 | 1 | X | X | X | 4 |
| Simon Dupuis | 0 | 0 | 1 | 0 | 0 | 0 | 0 | X | X | X | 1 |

== Playoffs ==
Round of 16
Guy Hemmings | 10
Martin Roy | 8
Serge Reid | 8
Pierre Charette | 5

Quarterfinal
Guy Hemmings | 8
Serge Reid | 1

Semifinals
Jean-Michel Ménard | 3
Martin Ferland | 9
Jean-Michel Ménard | 8
Guy Hemmings | 3

Final
Martin Ferland | 6
Jean-Michel Ménard | 9

=== A2 vs. B3 ===
February 14, 1400

| Sheet A | 1 | 2 | 3 | 4 | 5 | 6 | 7 | 8 | 9 | 10 | 11 | Final |
|---|---|---|---|---|---|---|---|---|---|---|---|---|
| Guy Hemmings 🔨 | 0 | 2 | 0 | 3 | 0 | 1 | 0 | 1 | 1 | 0 | 2 | 10 |
| Martin Roy | 1 | 0 | 2 | 0 | 2 | 0 | 2 | 0 | 0 | 1 | 0 | 8 |

=== A3 vs. B2 ===
February 14, 1400

| Sheet D | 1 | 2 | 3 | 4 | 5 | 6 | 7 | 8 | 9 | 10 | Final |
|---|---|---|---|---|---|---|---|---|---|---|---|
| Serge Reid | 2 | 1 | 0 | 1 | 0 | 1 | 0 | 2 | 1 | X | 8 |
| Pierre Charette 🔨 | 0 | 0 | 2 | 0 | 1 | 0 | 2 | 0 | 0 | X | 5 |

=== Quarterfinal ===
February 14, 1900

| Sheet D | 1 | 2 | 3 | 4 | 5 | 6 | 7 | 8 | 9 | 10 | Final |
|---|---|---|---|---|---|---|---|---|---|---|---|
| Guy Hemmings 🔨 | 0 | 3 | 0 | 3 | 1 | 0 | 1 | X | X | X | 8 |
| Serge Reid | 0 | 0 | 1 | 0 | 0 | 0 | 0 | X | X | X | 1 |

=== A1 vs. B1 ===
February 14, 1900

| Sheet B | 1 | 2 | 3 | 4 | 5 | 6 | 7 | 8 | 9 | 10 | Final |
|---|---|---|---|---|---|---|---|---|---|---|---|
| Martin Ferland 🔨 | 3 | 0 | 1 | 0 | 2 | 0 | 3 | X | X | X | 9 |
| Jean-Michel Ménard | 0 | 1 | 0 | 1 | 0 | 1 | 0 | X | X | X | 3 |

=== Semifinal ===
February 15, 0900

| Sheet C | 1 | 2 | 3 | 4 | 5 | 6 | 7 | 8 | 9 | 10 | Final |
|---|---|---|---|---|---|---|---|---|---|---|---|
| Guy Hemmings 🔨 | 0 | 1 | 0 | 1 | 0 | 1 | 0 | 0 | 0 | X | 3 |
| Jean-Michel Ménard | 1 | 0 | 2 | 0 | 1 | 0 | 1 | 2 | 1 | X | 8 |

=== Final ===
February 15, 1400

| Sheet C | 1 | 2 | 3 | 4 | 5 | 6 | 7 | 8 | 9 | 10 | Final |
|---|---|---|---|---|---|---|---|---|---|---|---|
| Martin Ferland 🔨 | 1 | 0 | 1 | 0 | 1 | 1 | 0 | 2 | 0 | X | 6 |
| Jean-Michel Ménard | 0 | 2 | 0 | 2 | 0 | 0 | 4 | 0 | 1 | X | 9 |
