= 2009 Saskatchewan Scotties Tournament of Hearts =

Curling tournament in Saskatchewan, Canada (2009)

The 2009 Saskatchewan (SaskTel) Scotties Tournament of Hearts, Saskatchewan's women's provincial curling championship, was held January 28 – February 1 at the Swift Current Curling Club in Swift Current. The winning team represented team Saskatchewan at the 2009 Scotties Tournament of Hearts in Victoria, British Columbia.

== Teams ==
Skip	Third	Second	Lead	Club(s)
Sherry Anderson	Kim Hodson	Heather Walsh	Donna Gignac	Granite Curling Club, Saskatoon
Jennifer Duczek	Joanne Vandermeulen	Sharon Sleeva	Kathy Sharp	Yorkton Curling Club, Yorkton
Chantelle Eberle	Leah Birnie	Nancy Inglis	Debbie Lozinski	Tartan Curling Club, Regina
Michelle Englot	Deanna Doig	Roberta Materi	Cindy Simmons	Tartan Curling Club, Regina
Amber Holland	Kim Schneider	Tammy Schneider	Heather Seeley	Tartan Curling Club, Regina
Jolene McIvor	Angela Gordon	Tanya Craig	Michelle McIvor	Tartan Curling Club, Regina
Stefanie Lawton	Marliese Kasner	Sherri Singler	Lana Vey	CN Curling Club, Saskatoon
Rene Miettinen	Maegan Clark	Amy Jurgens	Amy Yeager	Humboldt Curling Club, Humboldt
Sherrilee Orsted	Candace Newkirk	Christine Massier	Kristen Schlamp	Estevan Curling Club, Estevan
Ros Stewart	Julie Vandenameele	Christina Goertzen	Andrea Rudulier	Nutana Curling Club, Saskatoon
Tracey Streifel	Heather Torrie	Kristen Smith	Chris Paradis	Nutana Curling Club, Saskatoon
Cathy Trowell	Susan Hoffart	Denise Hersikorn	Terri Clark	Caledonian Curling Club, Regina

== Draw brackets ==
=== A Event ===
Round of 16
Ros Stewart	6
Cathy Trowell	4
Jennifer Duczek	2
Sherry Anderson	9
Sherrilee Orsted	6
Jolene McIvor	7
Rene Miettinen	10
Tracey Streifel	6

Quarterfinals
Stefanie Lawton	6
Ros Stewart	4
Chantal Eberle	4
Sherry Anderson	9
Amber Holland	10
Jolene McIvor	4
Michelle Englot	5
Rene Miettinen	11

Semifinals
Stefanie Lawton	11
Sherry Anderson	7
Amber Holland	4
Rene Miettinen	9

A Qualifier
Stefanie Lawton	10
Rene Miettinen	2

=== B Event ===
Round of 16
Cathy Trowell	1
Chantal Eberle	9
Jolene McIvor	8
Jennifer Duczek	1
Michelle Englot	9
Sherrilee Orsted	1
Ros Stewart	9
Tracey Streifel	4

Quarterfinals
Amber Holland	7
Chantal Eberle	4
Sherry Anderson	9
Jolene McIvor	1
Michelle Englot	8
Ros Stewart	3

Semifinals
Amber Holland	8
Sherry Anderson	4
Rene Miettinen	6
Michelle Englot	8

B Qualifier
Amber Holland	8
Michelle Englot	5

=== C Event ===
Quarterfinals		Semifinals		C Qualifier
		Rene Miettinen	7
Cathy Trowell	12	Cathy Trowell	6
Jennifer Duczek	4			Rene Miettinen	8
				Sherry Anderson	7
		Ros Stewart	5
		Sherry Anderson	10

Quarterfinals		Semifinals		C Qualifier
Sherrilee Orsted	3
Chantal Eberle	10	Chantal Eberle	4
Tracey Streifel	6	Jolene McIvor	8
Jolene McIvor	7			Jolene McIvor	8
				Michelle Englot	7

== Results ==
=== Draw 1 ===
January 28, 1330

Sheet 1	1	2	3	4	5	6	7	8	9	10	Final
Ros Stewart	0	0	1	0	1	2	1	1	0	X	6
Cathy Trowell	1	0	0	1	0	0	0	0	2	X	4

Sheet 2	1	2	3	4	5	6	7	8	9	10	Final
Jennifer Duczek	0	0	0	2	0	0	X	X	X	X	2
Sherry Anderson	5	1	1	0	1	1	X	X	X	X	9

Sheet 3	1	2	3	4	5	6	7	8	9	10	11	Final
Sherrilee Orsted	0	0	1	0	2	0	0	2	0	1	0	6
Jolene McIvor	2	1	0	1	0	1	0	0	1	0	1	7

Sheet 4	1	2	3	4	5	6	7	8	9	10	Final
Rene Miettinen	0	1	1	0	2	0	2	0	0	4	10
Tracey Streifel	1	0	0	1	0	3	0	1	0	0	6

=== Draw 2 ===
January 28, 1930

Sheet 1	1	2	3	4	5	6	7	8	9	10	Final
Rene Miettinen	2	2	0	3	0	2	0	2	X	X	11
Michelle Englot	0	0	2	0	2	0	1	0	X	X	5

Sheet 2	1	2	3	4	5	6	7	8	9	10	Final
Amber Holland	0	2	0	2	1	0	2	3	X	X	10
Jolene McIvor	0	0	1	0	0	3	0	0	X	X	4

Sheet 3	1	2	3	4	5	6	7	8	9	10	Final
Sherry Anderson	0	0	0	0	0	1	2	0	3	3	9
Chantal Eberle	0	0	0	0	1	0	0	3	0	0	4

Sheet 4	1	2	3	4	5	6	7	8	9	10	Final
Stefanie Lawton	0	2	0	0	0	1	1	1	0	1	6
Ros Stewart	1	0	1	0	0	0	0	0	2	0	4

=== Draw 3 ===
January 29, 0830

Sheet 1	1	2	3	4	5	6	7	8	9	10	Final
Stefanie Lawton	1	0	3	1	1	0	1	0	4	X	11
Sherry Anderson	0	3	0	0	0	2	0	2	0	X	7

Sheet 4	1	2	3	4	5	6	7	8	9	10	Final
Amber Holland	1	0	1	0	1	1	0	0	X	X	4
Rene Miettinen	0	2	0	4	0	0	2	1	X	X	9

=== Draw 4 ===
January 29, 1400

Sheet 1	1	2	3	4	5	6	7	8	9	10	Final
Jolene McIvor	0	0	1	2	1	1	1	0	2	X	8
Jennifer Duczek	0	0	0	0	0	0	0	1	0	X	1

Sheet 2	1	2	3	4	5	6	7	8	9	10	Final
Cathy Trowell	0	0	0	0	0	0	1	0	X	X	1
Chantal Eberle	0	0	0	2	1	5	0	1	X	X	9

Sheet 3	1	2	3	4	5	6	7	8	9	10	Final
Ros Stewart	2	0	0	2	3	2	0	X	X	X	9
Tracey Streifel	0	1	2	0	0	0	1	X	X	X	4

Sheet 4	1	2	3	4	5	6	7	8	9	10	Final
Michelle Englot	0	2	1	1	1	4	X	X	X	X	9
Sherrilee Orsted	1	0	0	0	0	0	X	X	X	X	1

=== Draw 5 ===
January 29, 1900

Sheet 1	1	2	3	4	5	6	7	8	9	10	Final
Amber Holland	0	1	1	0	2	1	0	1	0	1	7
Chantal Eberle	0	0	0	1	0	0	2	0	1	0	4

Sheet 2	1	2	3	4	5	6	7	8	9	10	Final
Ros Stewart	0	1	0	0	0	2	0	0	0	X	3
Michelle Englot	0	0	1	1	0	0	3	1	2	X	8

Sheet 3	1	2	3	4	5	6	7	8	9	10	Final
Stefanie Lawton	3	3	1	0	3	X	X	X	X	X	10
Rene Miettinen	0	0	0	2	0	X	X	X	X	X	2

Sheet 4	1	2	3	4	5	6	7	8	9	10	Final
Sherry Anderson	2	0	3	2	0	2	X	X	X	X	9
Jolene McIvor	0	0	0	0	1	0	X	X	X	X	1

=== Draw 6 ===
January 30, 1400

Sheet 2	1	2	3	4	5	6	7	8	9	10	Final
Tracey Streifel	0	1	0	1	0	3	0	0	1	0	6
Jolene McIvor	1	0	2	0	1	0	1	1	0	1	7

Sheet 3	1	2	3	4	5	6	7	8	9	10	Final
Chantal Eberle	0	0	1	0	2	0	3	4	X	X	10
Sherrilee Orsted	0	1	0	1	0	1	0	0	X	X	3

Sheet 4	1	2	3	4	5	6	7	8	9	10	Final
Jennifer Duzcek	0	1	0	1	0	1	0	1	0	X	4
Cathy Trowell	1	0	3	0	2	0	1	0	5	X	12

=== Draw 7 ===
January 30, 1900

Sheet 1	1	2	3	4	5	6	7	8	9	10	11	Final
Rene Miettinen	0	0	2	1	0	0	1	0	1	1	0	6
Michelle Englot	1	2	0	0	1	0	0	2	0	0	2	8

Sheet 3	1	2	3	4	5	6	7	8	9	10	Final
Sherry Anderson	0	0	0	1	0	0	2	1	0	X	4
Amber Holland	1	0	2	0	1	3	0	0	1	X	8

=== Draw 8 ===
January 31, 0830

Sheet 1	1	2	3	4	5	6	7	8	9	10	Final
Jolene McIvor	2	0	1	0	2	1	2	0	0	X	8
Chantal Eberle	0	2	0	1	0	0	0	0	1	X	4

Sheet 2	1	2	3	4	5	6	7	8	9	10	Final
Amber Holland	1	0	2	1	0	0	1	3	0	X	8
Michelle Englot	0	1	0	0	2	1	0	0	1	X	5

Sheet 3	1	2	3	4	5	6	7	8	9	10	11	Final
Rene Miettinen	3	0	1	0	1	0	0	1	0	0	1	7
Cathy Trowell	0	2	0	1	0	0	1	0	1	1	0	6

Sheet 4	1	2	3	4	5	6	7	8	9	10	Final
Sherry Anderson	0	0	2	2	0	2	0	4	X	X	10
Ros Stewart	2	0	0	0	2	0	1	0	X	X	5

=== Draw 9 ===
January 31, 1400

Sheet 2	1	2	3	4	5	6	7	8	9	10	11	Final
Rene Miettinen	1	1	0	0	1	0	3	0	1	0	1	8
Sherry Anderson	0	0	2	0	0	1	0	2	0	2	0	7

Sheet 3	1	2	3	4	5	6	7	8	9	10	Final
Michelle Englot	0	1	0	2	1	0	0	0	1	2	7
Jolene McIvor	0	0	2	0	0	2	1	3	0	0	8

== Playoffs ==
Page playoff system
A	Stefanie Lawton	7
B	Amber Holland	3
C1	Rene Miettinen	6
C2	Jolene McIvor	5

Semifinal
B	Amber Holland	6
C1	Rene Miettinen	7

Final
A	Stefanie Lawton	9
C1	Rene Miettinen	6

=== C1 vs. C2 ===
January 31, 1900

Sheet 4	1	2	3	4	5	6	7	8	9	10	Final
Rene Miettinen	0	2	0	0	0	1	0	2	0	1	6
Jolene McIvor	2	0	1	0	1	0	0	0	1	0	5

=== A vs. B ===
January 31, 1900

Sheet 1	1	2	3	4	5	6	7	8	9	10	Final
Stefanie Lawton	0	2	0	1	1	0	3	0	X	X	7
Amber Holland	0	0	1	0	0	0	0	2	X	X	3

=== Semi-final ===
February 1, 0930

Sheet 2	1	2	3	4	5	6	7	8	9	10	Final
Rene Miettinen	3	0	1	0	0	1	0	1	0	1	7
Amber Holland	0	0	0	2	1	0	1	0	2	0	6

=== Final ===
February 1, 1400

Sheet 3	1	2	3	4	5	6	7	8	9	10	Final
Stefanie Lawton	0	3	0	1	1	0	0	3	0	1	9
Rene Miettinen	0	0	2	0	0	3	0	0	1	0	6
