= CN Curling Club =

Curling club in Saskatoon, Canada

- Location: 1602 Chappell Drive; Saskatoon, Saskatchewan S7M 3Y1

Information
- Established: 1939
- Club type: Dedicated ice
- Curling Canada region: SCA Saskatoon Region
- Sheets of ice: Five
- Rock colours: Red and yellow

The CN Curling Club is a curling club located in the Montgomery Place neighbourhood of Saskatoon, Saskatchewan, Canada. Once one of six curling clubs in the city, it is today one of three clubs still operating, along with the Sutherland Curling Club and the Nutana Curling Club. The closure of the Granite Curling Club in 2022 left CN as the only club in the city on the west side of the South Saskatchewan River.

== History ==
The CN Curling Club was founded in 1939 by employees of CN Rail, who established a three-sheet outdoor rink adjacent to the rail yard in downtown Saskatoon—the club was constructed out of three box cars. By 1958, the club operated an artificial ice facility. In 1964, the city moved its rail yard from downtown to the western edge of the city in Montgomery Place. The curling club followed, and the current five-sheet facility was opened in time for the 1965 season.

=== Provincial champions ===
The lone CN rink to win a provincial title is Stefanie Lawton's, who represented Saskatchewan at the 2005 and 2009 Scotties Tournament of Hearts. Lawton's team finished fourth in both Scotties appearances. The Lawton rink also participated in the 2005 Canadian Olympic Curling Trials, finishing third, and won the 2008 Canada Cup.

Provincial titles by CN rinks
| Year | Event | Skip | Third | Second | Lead | Nationals record |
|---|---|---|---|---|---|---|
| 2009 | Scotties Tournament of Hearts | Stefanie Lawton | Marliese Kasner | Sherri Singler | Lana Vey | 7–5 |
| 2005 | Scott Tournament of Hearts | Stefanie Lawton | Marliese Miller | Sherri Singler | Chelsey Bell | 7–5 |

== See also ==
- List of curling clubs in Saskatchewan
