= 2005 Saskatchewan Scott Tournament of Hearts =

The 2005 Saskatchewan Scott Tournament of Hearts women's provincial curling championship, was held February 2–6 at the Assiniboia Civic Centre in Assiniboia, Saskatchewan. The winning team of Stefanie Lawton, represented Saskatchewan at the 2005 Scott Tournament of Hearts in St. John's, Newfoundland and Labrador, where the team finished round robin with a 7-4 record, losing the 3-4 game to Ontario's Jenn Hanna

== Teams ==
Skip	Vice	Second	Lead	Club
Sue Altman	Caroline Virgin	Christine Paradise	Marcia Indzeoski	Foam Lake Curling Club, Foam Lake
Sherry Anderson	Kim Hodson	Heather Walsh	Donna Gignac	Granite Curling Club, Saskatoon
Jan Betker	Sherry Linton	Joan McCusker	Marcia Gudereit	Callie Curling Club, Regina
Chantelle Eberle	Debbie Lozinski	Michelle Lemon	Meghan Sharp	Balgonie Curling Club, Balgonie
Michelle Englot	Darlene Kidd	Roberta Materi	Cindy Simmons	Tartan Curling Club, Regina
Stefanie Lawton	Marliese Miller	Sherri Singler	Chelsey Bell	CN Curling Club, Saskatoon
Cindy Street	Angela Gordon	Cori Dauphenais	Susan Hoffart	Tartan Curling Club, Regina
Heather Torrie	Nancy Martin	Sarah Boechler	Krista White	Nutana Curling Club, Saskatoon

== Standings ==
Skip	W	L
Sherry Anderson	6	1
Stefanie Lawton	5	2
Chantelle Eberle	5	2
Sue Altman	3	4
Jan Betker	3	4
Cindy Street	3	4
Michelle Englot	2	5
Heather Torrie	1	6

== Results ==
=== Draw 1 ===
February 2, 2:00 PM CT

Sheet A	1	2	3	4	5	6	7	8	9	10	11	Final
Lawton	0	0	1	0	3	0	0	1	0	2	0	7
Betker	2	0	0	1	0	2	0	0	2	0	1	8

Sheet B	1	2	3	4	5	6	7	8	9	10	Final
Eberle	2	2	0	1	0	4	0	2	2	X	13
Altman	0	0	2	0	3	0	2	0	0	X	7

Sheet C	1	2	3	4	5	6	7	8	9	10	11	Final
Street	0	0	1	0	1	1	1	0	2	0	0	6
Anderson	0	1	0	1	0	0	0	3	0	1	2	8

Sheet D	1	2	3	4	5	6	7	8	9	10	Final
Torrie	0	1	0	1	0	1	0	1	0	X	4
Englot	1	0	0	0	3	0	3	0	4	X	11

=== Draw 2 ===
February 2, 8:00 PM CT

Sheet A	1	2	3	4	5	6	7	8	9	10	Final
Altman	1	1	1	1	1	0	0	1	0	X	6
Englot	0	0	0	0	0	2	1	0	1	X	4

Sheet B	1	2	3	4	5	6	7	8	9	10	Final
Street	0	0	3	0	1	1	0	0	0	1	6
Lawton	0	0	0	2	0	0	0	1	1	0	4

Sheet C	1	2	3	4	5	6	7	8	9	10	Final
Betker	3	0	0	1	2	0	2	0	2	X	10
Torrie	0	0	1	0	0	2	0	1	0	X	4

Sheet D	1	2	3	4	5	6	7	8	9	10	Final
Anderson	1	1	1	1	0	1	1	1	X	X	7
Eberle	0	0	0	0	2	0	0	0	X	X	2

=== Draw 3 ===
February 3, 9:30 AM CT

Sheet A	1	2	3	4	5	6	7	8	9	10	Final
Torrie	1	0	0	1	0	2	0	0	2	0	6
Lawton	0	1	0	0	3	0	1	1	0	1	7

Sheet B	1	2	3	4	5	6	7	8	9	10	11	Final
Altman	0	2	0	0	0	0	0	1	0	2	0	5
Anderson	0	0	1	1	1	0	1	0	1	0	2	7

Sheet C	1	2	3	4	5	6	7	8	9	10	Final
Eberle	0	1	0	2	1	0	0	2	1	X	7
Englot	0	0	2	0	0	0	1	0	0	X	3

Sheet D	1	2	3	4	5	6	7	8	9	10	Final
Street	1	0	1	0	2	0	1	0	X	X	5
Betker	0	3	0	2	0	3	0	4	X	X	12

=== Draw 4 ===
February 3, 2:00 PM CT

Sheet A	1	2	3	4	5	6	7	8	9	10	11	Final
Eberle	1	0	0	0	2	0	0	0	2	1	3	9
Street	0	0	0	1	0	1	1	3	0	0	0	6

Sheet B	1	2	3	4	5	6	7	8	9	10	Final
Englot	1	1	0	2	1	0	3	X	X	X	8
Betker	0	0	1	0	0	1	0	X	X	X	2

Sheet C	1	2	3	4	5	6	7	8	9	10	Final
Torrie	4	0	0	1	0	0	0	2	1	X	8
Altman	0	1	2	0	1	0	0	0	0	X	4

Sheet D	1	2	3	4	5	6	7	8	9	10	Final
Lawton	1	0	0	2	0	0	0	1	3	X	7
Anderson	0	0	1	0	2	1	0	0	0	X	4

=== Draw 5 ===
February 4, 1:00 PM CT

Sheet A	1	2	3	4	5	6	7	8	9	10	Final
Englot	1	0	0	2	0	0	0	2	0	X	5
Anderson	0	2	2	0	0	1	2	0	2	X	9

Sheet B	1	2	3	4	5	6	7	8	9	10	Final
Torrie	0	2	0	1	0	0	1	0	0	X	3
Street	0	0	2	0	3	0	0	1	1	X	7

Sheet C	1	2	3	4	5	6	7	8	9	10	Final
Lawton	1	0	2	2	0	1	0	5	X	X	11
Eberle	0	1	0	0	1	0	1	0	X	X	3

Sheet D	1	2	3	4	5	6	7	8	9	10	Final
Betker	2	0	0	0	0	2	0	2	0	X	6
Altman	0	2	1	1	1	0	3	0	2	X	10

=== Draw 6 ===
February 4, 7:00 PM CT

Sheet A	1	2	3	4	5	6	7	8	9	10	Final
Street	0	2	0	2	0	0	0	0	0	X	4
Altman	1	0	1	0	0	1	1	2	1	X	7

Sheet B	1	2	3	4	5	6	7	8	9	10	Final
Lawton	0	2	1	1	1	0	1	1	X	X	7
Englot	1	0	0	0	0	1	0	0	X	X	2

Sheet C	1	2	3	4	5	6	7	8	9	10	11	Final
Anderson	0	0	1	0	1	1	0	1	0	0	1	5
Betker	0	1	0	2	0	0	0	0	0	1	0	4

Sheet D	1	2	3	4	5	6	7	8	9	10	Final
Eberle	0	4	1	0	0	3	0	0	2	X	10
Torrie	0	0	0	1	1	0	2	1	0	X	5

=== Draw 7 ===
February 5, 9:30 AM CT

Sheet A	1	2	3	4	5	6	7	8	9	10	Final
Anderson	0	3	1	1	0	0	0	4	X	X	9
Torrie	0	0	0	0	2	0	1	0	X	X	3

Sheet B	1	2	3	4	5	6	7	8	9	10	Final
Betker	1	0	0	0	0	2	0	1	0	0	4
Eberle	0	1	0	1	1	0	2	0	0	1	6

Sheet C	1	2	3	4	5	6	7	8	9	10	Final
Englot	1	0	2	1	1	0	0	1	0	0	6
Street	0	1	0	0	0	2	0	0	3	1	7

Sheet D	1	2	3	4	5	6	7	8	9	10	Final
Altman	0	0	0	1	0	3	0	0	0	X	4
Lawton	0	2	1	0	3	0	0	1	1	X	8

== Playoffs ==
Semifinal			Final
			1	Sherry Anderson	2
2	Stefanie Lawton	7	2	Stefanie Lawton	9
3	Chantelle Eberle	6

=== Semifinal ===
February 5, 7:00 PM CT

Sheet A	1	2	3	4	5	6	7	8	9	10	Final
Lawton	2	0	0	1	0	1	0	1	0	2	7
Eberle	0	1	0	0	1	0	2	0	2	0	6

=== Final ===
February 6, 2:00 PM CT

Sheet A	1	2	3	4	5	6	7	8	9	10	Final
Anderson	1	0	0	0	1	0	X	X	X	X	2
Lawton	0	0	0	4	0	5	X	X	X	X	9
