= Mark Homan =

Canadian curler

- Curler
- Born: Mark Brian Homan; April 17, 1979 (age 47); Ottawa, Ontario, Canada

Team
- Curling club: CC des Collines, Chelsea, QC

Curling career
- Member Association: Ontario (1996–2005; 2009–2016); Quebec (2007–2009; 2016–present)
- Brier: 0

Mark Brian Homan (born April 17, 1979) is a Canadian curler from Ottawa. He is the brother of five time Scotties Tournament of Hearts champion skip Rachel Homan. He is a former provincial junior men's and provincial mixed champion.

Homan played lead for the John Morris rink that won the 1997 Ontario Junior Championship. The team represented Ontario at the 1997 Canadian Junior Curling Championships, where they lost in the final to Alberta's Ryan Keane. After the season, Homan left the team to play Junior hockey.

Homan later moved to Montreal, Quebec, where he would play in the 2008 & 2009 Quebec Men's Provincial Curling Championships. He played second for Guy Hemmings in 2008, finishing with a 3–6 record. At the 2009 Quebec Men's Provincial Curling Championship, Homan played third for Sébastien Robillard, again finishing with a 3–6 record.

In 2009, Homan moved back to Ottawa. He joined the Greg Richardson rink as third for two seasons before forming his own team. Homan won the 2012 Ontario Mixed championship with his sister Rachel, and teammates Brian Fleischhaker and Alison Kreviazuk. The team would represent Ontario at the 2012 Canadian Mixed Curling Championship played in November 2011. They finished with an 8–5 record, missing the playoffs.

Homan would qualify for his first Ontario Men's Championship in 2014 with teammates Jeff Guignard at third, Paul Winford at second and Ron Hrycak at lead. He led his team to a 5–5 record, tied for 5th place.
