= Ted Butler =

Australian rules footballer, born 1903

Personal information
- Full name: Ted Butler
- Born: 16 July 1903
- Died: 30 November 1981 (aged 78)
- Original team: Kingsville Amateurs

Playing career^{1}
Years	Club	Games (Goals)
1926–27	Footscray	2 (1)
- ^{1} Playing statistics correct to the end of 1927.

Ted Butler (16 July 1903 - 30 November 1981) was a former Australian rules footballer who played with Footscray in the Victorian Football League (VFL).
