= Mas wrestling at the Ethnosport Cultural Festival =

Mas-wrestling is one of the wrestling ethnosports, which has a tournament at every edition of the Ethnosport Cultural Festival held annually in Turkey.

== Women ==
Games	Gold	Silver	Bronze
2016	Nurten Karkin	Müjgan Oktay	Fatma Çina
2017	Elif Emine Calbay	Kadriye Abay	Nazik Laçinok
2018	Müjgan Oktay	Emine Çalbay	Özgenur Türkmen

== Men ==
Games	Gold	Silver	Bronze
2016	Sinan Karcı	Burak Bingöl	Canip Canakoğlu
2017	Burak Bingöl	Oğuzhan Karcı	Harun Altay
2018	Vahdet Kemal Arıkapan	Burak Bingöl	Fırathan Koçhan

== Sources ==
- "Kazananlar" [The winners]. etnosporfestivali.com (in Turkish). World Ethnosports Federation. 2016.
- "ETNOSPOR 2017 KAZANANLAR" [The winners of Ethnosport 2017]. etnosporfestivali.com (in Turkish). World Ethnosports Federation. 2017.
- "2018 KAZANANLAR" [The winners of 2018]. etnosporfestivali.com (in Turkish). World Ethnosports Federation. 2018.
