= Oil wrestling at the Ethnosport Cultural Festival =

Oil wrestling is one of the wrestling ethnosports, which has a tournament at every edition of the Ethnosport Cultural Festival held annually in Turkey.

The tournament has different categories. Not all categories are included below.

== TEŞVİK ==
Games	Gold	Silver	Bronze
2016	Enes Kazım Alkan	Melih Yarba	Alparslan Das
2017	Enes Kazım Alkan	Melih Yarba	Alparslan Das
2018	Emirhan Taş	Arda Avcuoğlu	Melihcan Yarba / Alpaslan Daş

== Tozkorpan ==
Games	Gold	Silver	Bronze
2016	Yunus Emre Güral	Engin Atar	Ali Osman Güngördü
2017	Yunus Emre Güral	Engin Atar	Ali Osman Güngördü
2018	Ali Osman Güngördü	Engin Alp Yıldız	Batuhan Bardak / Orhan Deniz Özcan

== AYAK GÜREŞİ ==
Games	Gold	Silver	Bronze
2016	Yıldıray Pala	Tuğrul Menemenci	Ali Tuğra Akkoç
2017	Yıldıray Pala	Tuğrul Menemenci	Ali Tuğra Akkoç

== BÜYÜK ORTA ==
Games	Gold	Silver	Bronze
2016	Enes Kesler	Davut Demir	Harun Tok
2017	Enes Kesler	Davut Demir	Harun Tok
2018	Zafer Dama	Davut Pınar	Burak Şahin / Serkan Çavuşoğlu

== BAŞ ALTI ==
Games	Gold	Silver	Bronze
2016	Tanju Gemici	Recep Taslak	Osman Topuz
2017	Muhammed Emin	Tanju Gemici	Hamza Özkaradeniz/ Osman Kopuz
2018	Davut Demir	İsmet Karabulut	Temel Altıntaş / Harun Turan

== Sources ==
- "Kazananlar" [The winners]. etnosporfestivali.com (in Turkish). World Ethnosports Federation. 2016.
- "ETNOSPOR 2017 KAZANANLAR" [The winners of Ethnosport 2017]. etnosporfestivali.com (in Turkish). World Ethnosports Federation. 2017. Archived from the original on 21 May 2018.
- "2018 KAZANANLAR" [The winners of 2018]. etnosporfestivali.com (in Turkish). World Ethnosports Federation. 2018. Archived from the original on 21 May 2018.
