= Ethnosport =

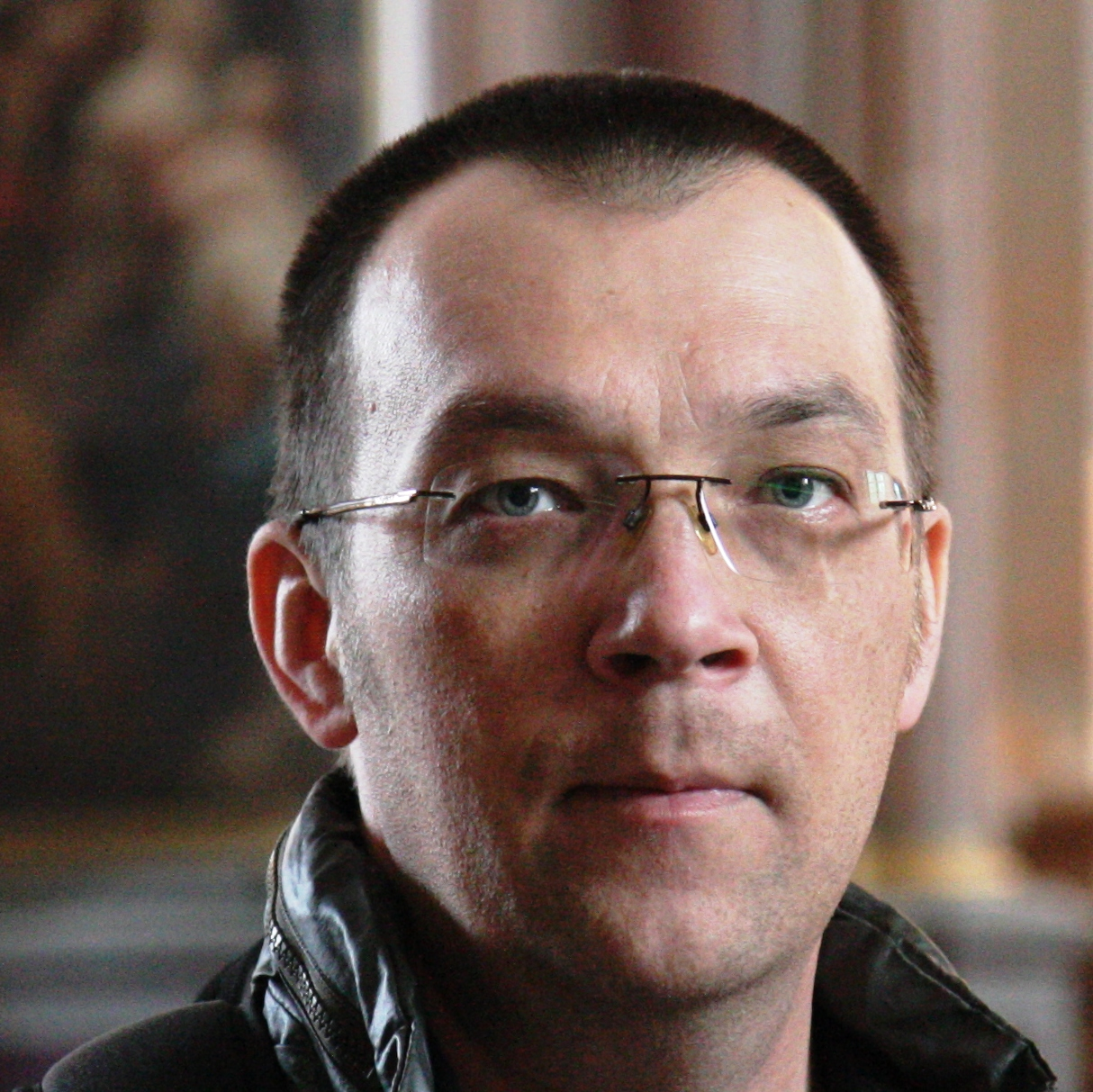
Alexey Kylasov

Ethnosport (from the Ancient Greek: ἔθνος — Ethnos meaning people + sport) is a set of traditional styles of physical activity, methods of their preservation, and their development, as described in the ethnosport theory of Russian cultural anthropologist Alexey Kylasov.

== Methodology ==
Ethnosport is an institutional form of united social and cultural space for all traditional styles of physical activity. The purpose of ethnosport theory is to provide a methodological basis for the design and prediction of the formation and functioning of social and cultural systems in conditions of rising representations of ethnocultural sport processes sport.

Sport became emancipated as traditional games and sport transformed in an advertised product. Sports became more independent from ethnocultural gaming traditions that in the past belonged to the entertainment of society.

Sport emancipation led to its emergence and consolidation, which was followed by a new social function. Currently, "sport for all" is often a symbol of the values of a liberal society, which are easily accepted worldwide as "universal" because of its popularity. This new function allows sport to impose "standard values" and "ideal models" on all nations, requiring automatic copying to the prejudice of age-old traditions and identity. This is how public mind "reads" sport ideals, such as the Olympics and international sport.

The international nature of sports facilitates consolidation of this new ideological function, accessible to all nations without belonging to any of them. Sport also has the ability to mask the deepening polarization between countries in the global division of labor as well as their political differences. Sport provides a targeted ideological influence (spread of liberal ideology) for the imaginary de-ideology. These differences do not seem as important if athletes from communist, capitalist, developed, or developing countries have an equal chances of succeed.

== Definition ==
Ethnosport identifies traditional styles of physical activity that have undergone a sportization, such as the introduction of sports-type institutes of sports, as expressed in the formation of federations, explicit refereeing, standard equipment, standard scoring systems, and regular, predictable outcomes.

== Examples ==
Examples of ethnosports include martial arts, bellydance, yoga, and massage.

== Efforts to preserve ethnosport ==
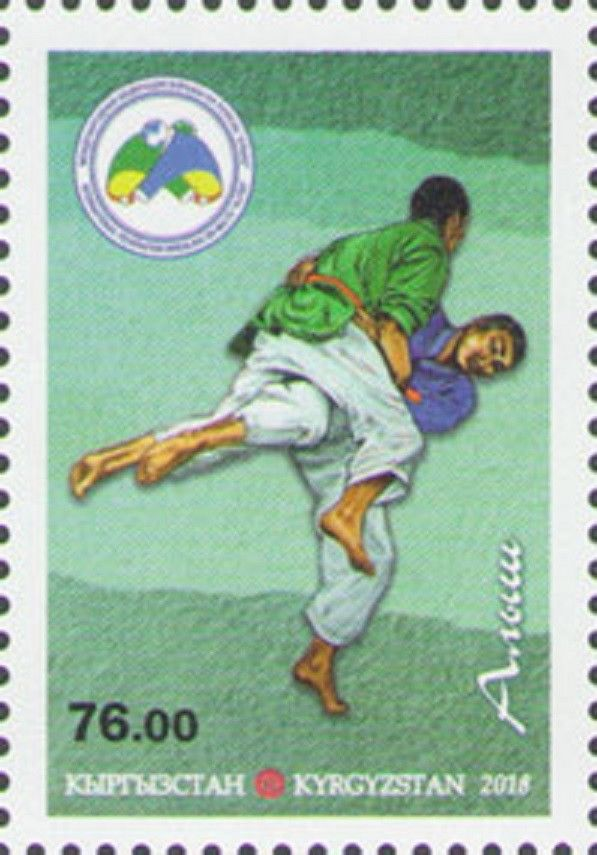
Alysh on a 2018 stamp of Kyrgyzstan

Today, cultural diversity of sport brings an institutional standard of promotion and development to traditional physical activities. Many countries are beginning to move traditional sports in certain direction, offering these traditional activities protection and preservation. Traditional games are proclaimed as a part of UNESCO World Heritage Sites. The Social and Human Science department of UNESCO coordinates efforts of various organizations and academic institutions with regards to traditional sport.

Globalization has led to the need for consideration of local cultural heritage, where local cultural resources (in particular, traditional styles of physical activity) are under threat of complete or partial destruction if they are not included in global sport projects, such as the Olympics, the World Games, the Commonwealth Games, the Mediterranean Games, and the Asian Games. International sports organizations such as the IOC, SportAccord, IWGA, IMSA, and FILA recognize this treat and try to combat it.

=== FILA ===
FILA has moved further than others in this direction. FILA launched a broad program of cooperation in the field of ethnosport. Now, along with Olympic freestyle wrestling, Greco-Roman wrestling, and Women's freestyle wrestling FILA develops Grappling, Pankration, Beach wrestling, and many other traditional wrestling styles. FILA works with the World Committee of Grappling and the Pankration and World Traditional Wrestling Committeeto put on the FILA World Wrestling Games. Because of FILA's efforts, tatarcha koresh and Kazakh kores were included in program of the 2013 Summer Universiade in Kazan as a new discipline: belt-wrestling. Recognition of Yakut wrestling (khapsagai) and mas-wrestling have allowed those disciplines to establish federations and hold their first continental championships using FILA's infrastructure.

=== Reaction ===
Although there is overall positive impact to recognition of ethnocultural sports as subjects of international sport, such progress does not satisfy enthusiasts of ethnosport who want full autonomy. Their distrust is expressed thusly: can sportization help spread at least some traditional physical activities? Immanuel Wallerstein who claims that countries cannot jump from the previous stage of development to another, if the previous stage is not included in the capitalist system of relations. By analogy, ethnocultural styles of competitions cannot become sports if their origin country is not included in the global world of sport.

== Ethnosport World Society ==
In 2012 the Ethnosport World Society was created in order to promote ethnosport as an alternative to Anglo-Saxon sports. Ethnosport was started from 2011 (Headquarters: Latvia).

== See also ==
- Ethnosport from 2011 (Headquarters: Latvia)
- World Nomad Games from 2014 (Headquarters: Kyrgyzstan).
- Ethnosport Cultural Festival from 2016 (Headquarters: Turkey).
- Great Kurultáj from 2007 (Headquarters: Hungary).
- World Turks Qurultai from 2017 (Headquarters: Kyrgyzstan).
- Naadam
- Highland games
- Cotswold Olimpick Games
- World Indigenous Games
- World Eskimo Indian Olympics
- Indigenous Peoples' Games
- North American Indigenous Games
- Traditional Sports and Games
