= Rilee Many Bears =

Personal information
- Native name: Iinomaahka
- Nationality: Siksika

Sport
- Country: Canada
- Sport: Running

Rilee Many Bears is a Canadian-born First Nations runner from Siksika Nation, Alberta, a part of the Blackfoot Confederacy. Many Bears, now 22 years of age, was presented with the name Iinomaahka, meaning Running Buffalo, during a naming ceremony while the Siksika Nation celebrated his achievements in running.

== Personal life ==
Rilee Many Bears was raised in Siksika Nation, Alberta, on the reserve where he lives with his younger siblings, cousins, and his aunt, who has taken him in as her own. Rilee's father, Morris Many Bears, battled addiction and died on June 27, 2013, at the age of 37. Rilee suffered from depression since the passing of his father, but uses his diagnosis as motivation to continue running. Rilee attended Bassano School about 53 km from Siksika Nation in Alberta. In high school, Rilee excelled in cross-country running and often represented his school in provincial competitions. Rilee trains at home, in Siksika Nation, as well as with the University of Calgary Track and Field Team. In 2016, Rilee was diagnosed with Wolf Parkinson's White Syndrome, a heart condition that causes a rapid heartbeat. He had it corrected with surgery and shortly after his recovery, he competed in the World Indigenous Games in Brazil.

== Achievements ==
Many Bears competed in the 2014 North American Indigenous Games in Regina, Saskatchewan, where he won gold in the 3,000m race, and bronze medals in both the 1,500m race and the 6 km cross country event.

Many Bears competed in the 2015 World Indigenous Games in Palmas, Tocantins, Brazil where he won the gold medal in the 8 km race.

In 2016, Many Bears became the first Siksika Nations member to complete the Boston Marathon.
