= 2023 North American Indigenous Games =

North American Indigenous Games
- Host city: Halifax, Nova Scotia, Canada
- Opening: 16 July
- Closing: 23 July
- Main venue: Scotiabank Centre

The 2023 North American Indigenous Games were held in Halifax, Nova Scotia from July 16 to 23. They featured 5000 athletes from 756 Indigenous nations competing in 16 sports across 21 venues, who also shared and celebrated their cultures.

== Bidding process ==
Halifax, also known for the games by its Mi’kmaq name, K'jipuktuk, won the initial 2020 North American Indigenous Games bidding process in 2018. This made it the first city in Atlantic Canada to host the games. They were postponed during the COVID-19 pandemic in 2020, then rescheduled for 2023.

== Funding ==
The Government of Canada provided $8.363 million in funding through various departmental streams. The Government of Nova Scotia announced a $3.5 million package when Halifax won the bid in 2018.

== Broadcasting ==
The Canadian Broadcasting Corporation streamed coverage of the games on its CBC Gem app throughout the week.

== Venues ==
- Scotiabank Centre - Halifax (opening ceremony)
- Sexton Memorial Gymnasium - Halifax (basketball)
- Canada Games Centre - Halifax (volleyball)
- Dauphinee Centre - Halifax (wrestling)
- Dalplex - Halifax (swimming and basketball)
- Halifax Common - Halifax (softball, cultural village and closing ceremony)
- BMO Soccer Centre - Halifax (soccer)
- Homburg Centre - Halifax (basketball)
- Point Pleasant Park - Halifax (cross country)
- Citadel Community Centre - Halifax (badminton)
- RBC Centre - Dartmouth (box lacrosse)
- Lake Banook - Dartmouth (canoe and kayak)
- Harbour East Courts - Dartmouth (beach volleyball)
- Beazley Complex - Dartmouth (athletics and baseball)
- Bedford Rifle Range - Bedford (rifle shooting)
- Bedford Hammonds Plains Community Centre - Bedford (basketball)
- The Links at Brunello - Timberlea (golf)
- Millbrook - Millbrook (3D archery)

== Sports ==
- 3D archery
- Athletics
- Badminton
- Baseball
- Basketball
- Beach volleyball
- Canoe/kayak
- Golf
- Box lacrosse
- Rifle shooting
- Soccer
- Softball
- Swimming
- Volleyball
- Wrestling

=== Calendar ===
OC	Opening ceremony	●	Event competitions	1	Event finals	CC	Closing ceremony

July	16th Sun	17th Mon	18th Tues	19th Wed	20th Thurs	21st Fri	22nd Sat	Total
Ceremonies	OC					CC		
Archery			●	●	●	8		8
Athletics			24	28	26	6		84
Badminton			●	●	6	9		15
Baseball		●	●	●	●	1		1
Basketball		●	●	●	●	6		6
Beach volleyball			●	●	3			3
Lacrosse		●	●	●	●	●	3	3
Canoe/Kayak		10	17	18	13			58
Golf			●	●	4			4
Rifle shooting		●	2	2	6	2		12
Soccer		●	●	●	●	1	3	4
Softball		●	●	●	●	●	4	4
Swimming				51	57			108
Volleyball		●	●	●	●	●	4	4
Wrestling			●	12				12
Total gold medals		10	43	111	115	33	14	326
July	16th Sun	17th Mon	18th Tues	19th Wed	20th Thurs	21st Fri	22nd Sat	Total

== Teams ==
- Alberta
- British Columbia
- California
- Colorado
- Connecticut
- (Quebec) Eastern Door and the North
- (Iroquois) Haudenosaunee
- Maine
- Manitoba
- Michigan
- Minnesota
- New Brunswick
- Newfoundland and Labrador
- New Mexico
- Northwest Territories
- Nova Scotia
- Nunavut
- Ontario
- Prince Edward Island
- Saskatchewan
- (Washington (state)) Washington
- Wisconsin
- Yukon

== Medal table ==
Host is highlighted

Rank	Delegation	Gold	Silver	Bronze	Total
1	Ontario	55	38	35	128
2	British Columbia	53	62	45	160
3	Saskatchewan	52	61	63	176
4	Manitoba	32	19	18	69
5	Alberta	27	28	27	82
6	Wisconsin	21	18	17	56
7	Yukon	19	10	9	38
8	New Mexico	18	15	18	51
9	Eastern Door & the North	17	24	22	63
10	Nova Scotia*	14	10	11	35
11	Newfoundland and Labrador	9	14	17	40
12	New Brunswick	4	5	8	17
13	Prince Edward Island	3	2	3	8
14	Nunavut	2	2	5	9
15	Haudenosaunee	1	4	0	5
16	Northwest Territories	1	2	9	12
17	Minnesota	0	3	0	3
18	Maine	0	1	1	2
19	California	0	0	5	5
Totals (19 entries)		328	318	313	959

== Medallists ==
=== 3D archery ===
16U

Event	Gold	Silver	Bronze
Boys' compound	Tayden Shott; Alberta	Kael Epp; Yukon	Branden Nightingale; Saskatchewan
Boys' barebow	Cikqwlx Hall-Andrew; British Columbia	Malikai Magdalena; New Mexico	Mitchell Kresowaty; Saskatchewan
Girls' compound	Lyrik Alexi Shelby Albert; Saskatchewan	Anya Pinel; Ontario	Waasayah Munro-Soldier; Manitoba
Girls' barebow	Madisen Hailey Minks; Alberta	Winona McLean; Saskatchewan	Mya Wilson; Yukon

19U

Event	Gold	Silver	Bronze
Boys' compound	Cody Chiasson; New Brunswick	Wilbur Blackdeer; Wisconsin	Julien Albert; Saskatchewan
Boys' barebow	Wyatt McLeod; Saskatchewan	Alexander Paul; Nova Scotia	Dawson Widney; Yukon
Girls' compound	Nadine Eve Bear; Alberta	Jasmine Wapemoose; Saskatchewan	Ainsley Abitong-Sinobert; Ontario
Girls' barebow	Phoenix Widney; Yukon	Taylor Hartlen; Nova Scotia	Kaydynce Taypotat; Saskatchewan

=== Athletics ===
14U

Event	Gold	Silver	Bronze
Boys' 80 m	Jackson Chastellaine; Manitoba	Broden Paul; Alberta	Jack James Sharpe; Newfoundland and Labrador
Boys' 150 m	Jackson Chastellaine; Manitoba	Broden Paul; Alberta	Jack James Sharpe; Newfoundland and Labrador
Boys' 800 m	Haston Pawluski; Alberta	Darius Cajero; New Mexico	Kohl McDonald; Northwest Territories
Boys' 1200 m	Haston Pawluski; Alberta	Kohl McDonald; Northwest Territories	Ethan Boucher; Northwest Territories
Boys' 2 km cross-country	Haston Pawluski; Alberta	Darius Cajero; New Mexico	Mikael McKenzie; Eastern Door and the North
Boys' 4×100 m relay	Saskatchewan; Tyson Bird; Kyeran Murphy; Nicholas William Reilly; Cashian Sandry	Manitoba; Cashton Barron; Cashton Chastellaine; Jackson Chastellaine; Chase Macdonald	Northwest Territories; Ethan Boucher; Greyson Catholique; Dreighson Mercredi; Kowen Modeste
Boys' 4×400 m relay	Northwest Territories; Ethan Boucher; Greyson Catholique; Kohl McDonald; Kyren Poitras	Manitoba; Jackson Chastellaine; Chase Macdonald; Révin Therrien; Danny Whitford	Saskatchewan; Tyson Bird; Kevin Lerat; Kyeran Murphy; Nicholas William Reilly
Boys' high jump	Kyeran Murphy; Saskatchewan	Marley St-Onge Pinette; Eastern Door and the North	Kosis Linke; British Columbia
Boys' long jump	Jack James Sharpe; Newfoundland and Labrador	Cashian Sandry; Saskatchewan	Kyeran Murphy; Saskatchewan
Boys' shot put	Xavier Aguonie-Fox; Ontario	Broden Paul; Alberta	Clinton Merasty; Saskatchewan
Boys' discus throw	Sawyer Moccasin; Alberta	Wolfe Ross; Saskatchewan	Clinton Merasty; Saskatchewan
Boys' javelin throw	Wolfe Ross; Nova Scotia	James Michael Woelders; British Columbia	Sequan Shendo-Smith; New Mexico
Girls' 80 m	Sasha Wilson; Saskatchewan	Alex Sali; Saskatchewan	Isla Rose Mitchell; Alberta
Girls' 150 m	Sasha Wilson; Saskatchewan	Alex Sali; Saskatchewan	Samantha Shipley; British Columbia
Girls' 800 m	Mykeia Vicenti-Wolf; New Mexico	Isla Rose Mitchell; Alberta	Alina Trujillo-Sando; New Mexico
Girls' 1200 m	Mykeia Vicenti-Wolf; New Mexico	Alina Trujillo-Sando; New Mexico	Olivia Trann; Saskatchewan
Girls' 2 km cross-country	Mykeia Vicenti-Wolf; New Mexico	Olivia Trann; Saskatchewan	Alina Trujillo-Sando; New Mexico
Girls' 4×100 m relay	Saskatchewan; Novah Laiken Kaebri Dalke; Anaeya Duesing-Bird; Alex Sali; Sasha Wilson	Eastern Door and the North; Malia Montour; Maylan Montour; Sybeena Petiquay; Jayla White	Manitoba; Lily Lounsbury; Jessica Murdock; Addison Price; Demi Robertson
Girls' 4×400 m relay	Saskatchewan; Novah Laiken Kaebri Dalke; Alex Sali; Mila Stonechild; Sasha Wilson	Eastern Door and the North; Malia Montour; Maylan Montour; Sybeena Petiquay; Jayla White	not awarded
Girls' high jump	Emelie Watson; Saskatchewan	Addison Price; Manitoba	Demi Robertson; Manitoba
Girls' long jump	Sasha Wilson; Saskatchewan	Alex Sali; Saskatchewan	Demi Robertson; Manitoba
Girls' shot put	Blaire Rickard; Ontario	Sypris Lukye; Alberta	Willow Peters; Nova Scotia
Girls' discus throw	Mila Stonechild; Saskatchewan	Sypris Lukye; Alberta	Sophia Thunderchild; Saskatchewan
Girls' javelin throw	Jayla White; Eastern Door and the North	Sypris Lukye; Alberta	Mila Stonechild; Saskatchewan

16U

Event	Gold	Silver	Bronze
Boys' 100 m	Dreyten Bugler-Cann; Saskatchewan	Maddon Nicholas Pagee; Alberta	Corey Bird; New Mexico
Boys' 200 m	Dreyten Bugler-Cann; Saskatchewan	Ethan Gonzalez; Wisconsin	Maddon Nicholas Pagee; Alberta
Boys' 300 m	Dreyten Bugler-Cann; Saskatchewan	Ethan Gonzalez; Wisconsin	Hayna Francis; Maine
Boys' 800 m	Deron Lastyano; New Mexico	Tristan Nicholas Bullen; Newfoundland and Labrador	James Reed; British Columbia
Boys' 1200 m	Deron Lastyano; New Mexico	Cree Simon Defoe; Wisconsin	Jonathan Lyle Sanchez; New Mexico
Boys' 2000 m	Kale Loretto; New Mexico	Jonathan Lyle Sanchez; New Mexico	Cree Simon Defoe; Wisconsin
Boys' 3 km cross-country	Nuhkon Shendo-Smith; New Mexico	James Reed; British Columbia	Vincent Madalena Jr. New Mexico
Boys' 4×100 m relay	Newfoundland and Labrador; Tristan Nicholas Bullen; Philip Sean Reid; Carter Roberts; Griffin Simon	Saskatchewan; Mikeal Bird; Dreyten Bugler-Cann; Kaden Mckay; Keeston Merasty	New Mexico; Darius Cajero; Kale Loretto; Jonathan Lyle Sanchez; Nuhkon Shendo-Smith
Boys' 4×400 m relay	Saskatchewan; Mikeal Bird; Dreyten Bugler-Cann; Brock Huvenaars; Leland Sylvestre	Ontario; John Baillie; Mark Baillie; Kain David Cristofaro; Jacob Isaac Day	British Columbia; Eli Hall; James Reed; Jensen Tremblay; Jackson Whitford
Boys' high jump	Leland Sylvestre; Saskatchewan	Jackson Whitford; British Columbia	Danny Legault; British Columbia
Boys' long jump	Dreyten Bugler-Cann; Saskatchewan	Maddon Nicholas Pagee; Alberta	Samuel Simon; New Brunswick
Boys' triple jump	Jacoby Francis; Saskatchewan	Breilan Levi labobe Alberta	Kain David Cristofaro; Ontario
Boys' shot put	Brody Bressette; Ontario	Tristen Kurek; Saskatchewan	Griffin Simon; Newfoundland and Labrador
Boys' discus throw	Brody Bressette; Ontario	Danny Legault; British Columbia	Tristen Kurek; Saskatchewan
Boys' javelin throw	Griffin Simon; Newfoundland and Labrador	Rylan Brooks; British Columbia	Keeston Merasty; Saskatchewan
Girls' 100 m	Gabby Paterson; Alberta	Hunter Kajnere; Saskatchewan	Emily Jones; Ontario
Girls' 200 m	Gabby Paterson; Alberta	Emily Zunie; New Mexico	Emily Jones; Ontario
Girls' 300 m	Emily Zunie; New Mexico	Montana Kulchyski; Saskatchewan	Abygail McDonald; Northwest Territories
Girls' 800 m	Marisel Yepa; New Mexico	Ashlee Adams; Newfoundland and Labrador	Aaliyah Belanger; Saskatchewan
Girls' 1200 m	Marisel Yepa; New Mexico	Ashlee Adams; Newfoundland and Labrador	Aaliyah Belanger; Saskatchewan
Girls' 2000 m	Marisel Yepa; New Mexico	Sophia Yepa; New Mexico	Ashlee Adams; Newfoundland and Labrador
Girls' 3 km cross-country	Marisel Yepa; New Mexico	Sophia Yepa; New Mexico	Ashlee Adams; Newfoundland and Labrador
Girls' 4×100 m relay	Saskatchewan; Leighton Beaudry-Eppen; Aveda Boyer; Hunter Kajner; Montana Kulchyski	Newfoundland and Labrador; Morgan Gabriel; Liberty Hollett; Victoria Shea; Gabrielle Simon	New Mexico; Lelani Romero; Alina Trujillo-Sando; Marisel Yepa; Sophia Yepa
Girls' 4×400 m relay	Saskatchewan; Aaliyah Belanger; Aveda Boyer; Hunter Kajner; Montana Kulchyski	New Mexico; Lelani Romero; Alina Trujillo-Sando; Marisel Yepa; Sophia Yepa	Newfoundland and Labrador; Ashlee Adams; Charlotte Reid; Victoria Shea; Gabrielle Simon
Girls' high jump	Gabby Paterson; Alberta	Cate Gaudry; Nova Scotia	Jordin Parsons; Nova Scotia
Girls' long jump	Gabby Paterson; Alberta	Raina Garland; Manitoba	Cate Gaudry; Nova Scotia
Girls' triple jump	Leighton Beaudry-Eppen; Saskatchewan	Raina Garland; Manitoba	not awarded
Girls' shot put	America Cackowski; Wisconsin	Jordin Parsons; Nova Scotia	Jade Pelland; Manitoba
Girls' discus throw	America Cackowski; Wisconsin	Jordin Parsons; Nova Scotia	Keni Sampson; British Columbia
Girls' javelin throw	Jade Pelland; Manitoba	Jordin Parsons; Nova Scotia	Keni Sampson; British Columbia

19U

Event	Gold	Silver	Bronze
Boys' 100 m	Ali Davenport; Wisconsin	Tishon Wanotch; Saskatchewan	Brendan Cote-Williamson; Saskatchewan
Boys' 200 m	Ali Davenport; Wisconsin	Tishon Wanotch; Saskatchewan	Brendan Cote-Williamson; Saskatchewan
Boys' 400 m	Nathaniel Stuit; British Columbia	Rodney Maracle; Ontario	Brendan Cote-Williamson; Saskatchewan
Boys' 800 m	Jayvin Crosschild; Saskatchewan	Jared Peterson; New Mexico	Rodney Maracle; Ontario
Boys' 1500 m	Jayvin Crosschild; Saskatchewan	Kinley Crosschild; Saskatchewan	Lucas Williams; New Mexico
Boys' 3000 m	Jayvin Crosschild; Saskatchewan	Kinley Crosschild; Saskatchewan	Theodore Round Face; New Mexico
Boys' 8 km cross-country	Lucas Williams; New Mexico	Matthew Cornect; Newfoundland and Labrador	Theodore Round Face; New Mexico
Boys' 4×100 m relay	Newfoundland and Labrador; Evan Michael Hefferan; Ethan March; Nicholas Shea; Brady Young	Wisconsin; Omar Bailey; Ali Davenport; Ethan Gonzalez; Wayne Thompson	New Mexico; Corey Bird; Aaron Shukar Lahi; Jared Peterson; Wequai Shendo-Smith
Boys' 4×400 m relay	Saskatchewan; Brendan Cote-Williamson; Jayvin Crosschild; Kinley Crosschild; Tishon Wanotch	Newfoundland and Labrador; Matthew Cornect; Evan Michael Hefferan; Ethan March; Marcus Spingle	Wisconsin; Omar Bailey; Imanuel Brinegar; Trestian Brinegar; Ethan Gonzalez
Boys' high jump	Christopher Penney; Newfoundland and Labrador	Tishon Wanotch; Saskatchewan	Kendal Bear; Manitoba
Boys' long jump	Tishon Wanotch; Saskatchewan	Ali Davenport; Wisconsin	Blaze Benediktson; Manitoba
Boys' triple jump	Jabari Benjamin; Nova Scotia	Evan Abel; Ontario	Blaze Benediktson; Manitoba
Boys' shot put	Carson Favel; Saskatchewan	Owen Parsons; Nova Scotia	Rain Jameson; Alberta
Boys' discus throw	Owen Parsons; Nova Scotia	Rain Jameson; Alberta	Asenex Turney; Wisconsin
Boys' javelin throw	Rain Jameson; Alberta	Owen Parsons; Nova Scotia	Jordan Mora; New Mexico
Girls' 100 m	Asalia Williams; Wisconsin	Keenyah Murray; Ontario	Jewel Boland; Newfoundland and Labrador
Girls' 200 m	Asalia Williams; Wisconsin	Amyah Chosa; New Mexico	Emma Noskey; Alberta
Girls' 400 m	Asalia Williams; Wisconsin	Rayne Elizabeth Cyr; Saskatchewan	Maria Shea; Newfoundland and Labrador
Girls' 800 m	Taylar Brown; Alberta	Nicole Pierce; New Mexico	Shania Chavez; New Mexico
Girls' 1500 m	Maren Kasunich; Ontario	Anna May; Ontario	Kaydence Platero; New Mexico
Girls' 3000 m	Maren Kasunich; Ontario	Anna May; Ontario	Nicole Pierce; New Mexico
Girls' 6 km cross-country	Maren Kasunich; Ontario	Shania Chavez; New Mexico	Nicole Pierce; New Mexico
Girls' 4×100 m relay	Ontario; Saraya Eshkawkogan; Mackenzie Innes; Maren Kasunich; Keenyah Murray	New Mexico; Shania Chavez; Amyah Chosa; Mykeia Vicenti-Wolf; Emily Zunie	Newfoundland and Labrador; Marley Bennett; Jewel Boland; Charity Hollett; Maria Shea
Girls' 4×400 m relay	New Mexico; Nicole Pierce; Tayla Vicente; Mykeia Vicenti-Wolf; Emily Zunie	Saskatchewan; Morgan Burns; Ainsley Grace Clark; Rayne Elizabeth Cyr; Haylie Desjarlais	Ontario; Saraya Eshkawkogan; Maren Kasunich; Gabby Landry; Melinda Sheppit-Edwards
Girls' high jump	Saraya Eshkawkogan; Ontario	Hayley Oleschak; Manitoba	Alyssa Poitras; Saskatchewan
Girls' long jump	Ainsley Clark; Saskatchewan	Emma Noskey; Alberta	Gabby Landry; Ontario
Girls' triple jump	Morgan Burns; Saskatchewan	Saraya Eshkawkogan; Ontario	Ainsley Clark; Saskatchewan
Girls' shot put	Amyah Chosa; New Mexico	Chenoa Gabriel; Newfoundland and Labrador	Leshaunie Hadley; New Mexico
Girls' discus throw	Seneca Cloud Funmaker; Wisconsin	Leshaunie Hadley; New Mexico	Chenoa Gabriel; Newfoundland and Labrador
Girls' javelin throw	Rayna Sanderson; Manitoba	Brooklyn Arcand; Saskatchewan	Ciarah Worm; Saskatchewan

=== Badminton ===
16U

Event	Gold	Silver	Bronze
Boys' singles	Olsen Ford; Newfoundland and Labrador	Chace Ruecker; Saskatchewan	Andrew Kay-Grenier; Northwest Territories
Girls' singles	Tina Kudlualik; Nunavut	Kate Edgar; British Columbia	Kendra Hancock; Manitoba
Boys' doubles	Saskatchewan; Kayden Pambrun; Chace Ruecker	Northwest Territories; Andrew Kay-Grenier; Detonaze Paulette	Nunavut; Ryan Uquqtuq; Dwayne Veevee
Girls' doubles	Newfoundland and Labrador; Brooklyn Wolfrey; Sierra Wolfrey	Nunavut; Tina Kudlualik; Allie Ningeocheak	Manitoba; Kendra Hancock; Orenda Handel
Mixed doubles	Newfoundland and Labrador; Olsen Ford; Sierra Wolfrey	Newfoundland and Labrador; Gavin Lovell; Brooklyn Wolfrey	Nunavut; Allie Ningeocheak; Dwayne Veevee

19U

Event	Gold	Silver	Bronze
Boys' singles	Keston Gerard; Saskatchewan	Joshua Jackson; Saskatchewan	Cole McDonald; Nova Scotia
Girls' singles	Rylee Normand; Manitoba	Sydney Cloutier; Ontario	Clear Blake-Pottle; Newfoundland and Labrador
Boys' doubles	Manitoba; Evan Hancock; Dwayne Oman	Saskatchewan; Keston Gerard; Joshua Jackson	Nunavut; Rodney Nakoolak; Kenneth Takatak
Girls' doubles	Manitoba; Rylee Normand; Maureen Thompson	Newfoundland and Labrador; Clear Blake-Pottle; Ella Jacque	Nunavut; Sheila Akulukjuk; Iris Sowdluapik
Mixed doubles	Ontario; Calder Bell; Victoria Bergeron	Manitoba; Evan Hancock; Rylee Normand	Nunavut; Sheila Akulukjuk; Kenneth Takatak

=== Baseball ===
Event	Gold	Silver	Bronze
19U mixed	Manitoba; Cédric Lagassé; Eric Cote; Chris Tetrault; Cody Gunderson; Brett Lucko; Rylan Slatcher; Matthew Thompson; Landon Gudnason; Lincoln Carriere; Logan Dearborn; Mason Hooper; Bryce Raven; Evan McIvor; Nixon Carriere; Micheal Lindsay; Ryder Duncan	Wisconsin; Presley Allen; Tristan Rainey; Brayden Connors; Brady Shepard; Frank Shepard; Brett Bartholomew Owen; Lyndon Greengrass; Lata'tya*se Smith; Austin Peters; George Bruette; Pete Bruette; Raymond LeMieux III; Wendell Waukau Jr; Pearson Denny	Saskatchewan

=== Basketball ===
Event	Gold	Silver	Bronze
14U boys	Wisconsin; Corey Michael Hindsley Jr. Silas Cohen; Mason Anthony Laster; Roman Rasmussen; DeBron Danforth; Raylon Baird; Javon James; Gabriel Boivin; Tristian Lawe; Lucas Murphy	Ontario; Cohen Keyes; Hunter McCourt; Kaden Thomas; Takoda Plett; Noah Jeffrey; Kane Bruno-John Dion; Rodderek Smith; Tristan Scammell; Kooper Maracle; Quintin Layfield; Hayden Lloyd; Wade Charles Mark Cheechoo	British Columbia; Cassius Robinson; Carter Jay Rivers Simpson; Waki-Ya Charging Bear Diablo; Benjamin Faofua Savea; Coleman Reid Edgar-Neufeld; Braunson Slack; Marcus Arnold Otto Smith; Carson Humpherville; Tauras Potvin; Stanley Ross Yeomans-Stewart
14U girls	Ontario; Korissa Davis; Tess Shakell; Ashtyn Wigwas; Selena Carpenter; Marissa Hill; Valorie Maracle; Frances Vollett; Victoria McCourt; Molly Cook-Martin; Brooklyn Maracle	Wisconsin; Olivia Pyawasay; Haley Heath; Dacey Webster; Adrian Beaulieu-Morgan; Kalista Blackowl; Eunique Blackowl; Aiyana Pemberton; HarmonyStar Walker; Kendra Bigboy-Piehl	Alberta; Maya Lynn Atoa; Namayo Daphne Cheechoo; Kodi Plume; Ella Keller; Sakula Fox; Illy-Anna Cat Face; Bella Fox; Ella Suntjens; Ivy Alicia Brandsma; Kaylah Lacika Wells; Tia Saddleback; Demi Glory Potts
16U boys	Wisconsin; Gavin Michael Greene; Nathaniel Leroy Gilpin; Quintin Bresette; Valin Mykel Ramberg; Cecil Dean Lopez; Javon Silva; Anikohsaeh Corn; Barron Waupoose; Kenehsaeh Waukau; King Lyons; Reese Kakwitch; Ryan Corn	Minnesota; Andrew Roy; Hassani Cole Bruton; Kingsly Whitebird; Muckwa Roberts Jr. William Moose Jr. Malakai Crow; Lorenzo Rey Reyes; Tateyn Boswell; Ethan Buckholtz; Augie Peltier; Ryan Nicholas Kingbird	Eastern Door and the North; Jack Ryan Limoges; Zachary Ottawa; Elliot Louis Nicolas Jean; Davery Condo/Mitchell; Kayden Williamson-Deere; Rupert Weistche; Michael Williamson-Deere; Masson Ronnald utin Cooncome; Emery Moar; Jos-Alexy Mattawa; Nolan Jr Gunner
16U girls	Alberta; Charlie Adolphe; Teagan Wells; Cassie Cadieux; Nelly Zoey Young Pine; Zuri Angeline Fox; Emilie Rikal Paige Morin; Matt Crosschild; Anna Natasha Mercier; Cameron McMaster; Kaycee Jean Tallman; Kayla Giroux; Mya Regier	Wisconsin; Kandence Keahna Funmaker; Kylee Elle Beversdorf; Mariah Cloud; Marley Atkinson; Josalyn White; Aaliyah Corn; Urijah Reevis; Destiny Webster; Anisa Peters	British Columbia; Tehya Rose Carpenter; Kura Lua Rorick; Rachael Tori Sam; Ambrose Haintz; Taegan Lee; Kailani Kalea Austin; Jayla Robinson; Genaveve Asia Marie Pierre; Jaidin Knighton; Anjelena Stephens; Kashlyn Coshka Mack
19U boys	Alberta; Alexander Deranger; Carter Yellow Horn; Hayden Many Grey Horses; Jude Blackwater; Talon Weasel Head; Nathan Big Sorrel Horse; Hughston Goodstriker; Cody Melting Tallow; Zachary Many Grey Horses; Franklin Jr Crazy Bull; Cashton Red Crow	Minnesota; Laiten Goodthunder; Cale Jackson; Cade Beaulieu; Charles VandeBerg; Samuel Wilson; Yamni Crow; Gerald Alan Kingbird Jr. Jeremy Brown Jr. Kenneth Fox, III	British Columbia; Ethyn Williams-Crawford; Isaiah Lafond; Peter Waardenburg; Michael Morven; Stanley Swanson; Cheveyo Kian Navajo Parker; Willis Stanley; Drew Williams; Michael Spoonhunter; Kaleb Montgomery-Reid; Joseph Lewis; Joseph Lewis
19U girls	Manitoba; Crystal Garson; Grace Mckay; Carmen Buck; Maddie Amyotte; Keara Howden; Rylee Ault; Jayna Maytwayashing; Abigail Sweeny; Lauryn Wilson; Hope LaRocque; Faith LaRocque	Ontario	Wisconsin; Maekayla Cadotte; Neejana Lynn Armstrong; Victoria Ann Miles; Yvette Marie Miles; Eajah Leigh Danforth; Taliah Degroot; Haley Reed; Marjaria Stevens; Rhianna Danforth; Samara Kane; Katie Waukau; Mariah Fish

=== Beach volleyball ===
Event	Gold	Silver	Bronze
16U girls	Saskatchewan	British Columbia; Tymeko Irene Collinson; Mischa Jai Krawczyk	Yukon; Elsa Gleason; Leah Elizabeth McLean
19U boys	New Brunswick; Odin Sanipass; Ala’suinu Madahbee Barnaby	Newfoundland and Labrador; Samuel Warren; Patrick Lucas Dobbin	Nova Scotia; Loukas Clair; Joshua Dennis
19U girls	Newfoundland and Labrador; Jorja Pevie; Megan Williams	Saskatchewan	Yukon; Jamie Madison Nickel; Jennifer Lauren Tuton

=== Box lacrosse ===
Event	Gold	Silver	Bronze
16U boys	Ontario	British Columbia	Alberta
19U boys	Ontario	British Columbia	Alberta
19U girls	British Columbia	Ontario	Alberta

=== Canoe and kayak ===
14U

Event	Gold	Silver	Bronze
Boys' C2 1000 m	British Columbia; Zane Avery Jasper; Mason Point	Eastern Door and the North; Jaxton McComber; Shakohentinehtha Phillips	Nova Scotia; Malik Stevens; Callum Whynacht
Boys' C2 3000 m	British Columbia; Mason Point; Alexander Russell Smith	British Columbia; Zane Avery Jasper; Wyze Smithx	Ontario; Wes Clouthier; Keegan Kranz
Boys' C1 1000 m	Wes Clouthier; Ontario	Xwut’ul’qinum Smith; British Columbia	Daniel Malysh; Alberta
Boys' C1 3000 m	Mason Point; British Columbia	Zane Avery Jasper; British Columbia	Daniel Malysh; Alberta
Boys' K1 200 m	Callum Whynacht; Nova Scotia	Daniel Malysh; Alberta	Shakohentinehtha Phillips; Eastern Door and the North
Boys' K1 1000 m	Callum Whynacht; Nova Scotia	Daniel Malysh; Alberta	Shakohentinehtha Phillips; Eastern Door and the North
Boys' K1 3000 m	Callum Whynacht; Nova Scotia	Breas Ross; Manitoba	Pierce Constant; Manitoba
Girls' C2 1000 m	Eastern Door and the North; Teiewentsarihtha Rice; Tekaronhiakha:sions Rice	Saskatchewan; Suri Cook; Summer Dusterbeck	Eastern Door and the North; Teienerahtatenionkwas Goodleaf; Teiakotsahon McComber
Girls' C2 3000 m	Eastern Door and the North; Addison Goodleaf; Tekaronhiakha:sions Rice	Eastern Door and the North; Teienerahtatenionkwas Goodleaf; Teiakotsahon McComber	Saskatchewan; Suri Cook; Summer Dusterbeck
Girls' C1 1000 m	Summer Dusterbeck; Saskatchewan	Suri Cook; Saskatchewan	Teiewentsarihtha Rice; Eastern Door and the North
Girls' C1 3000 m	Vivianna Thomas; British Columbia	Summer Dusterbeck; Saskatchewan	Jamie Gareau; Manitoba
Girls' K1 200 m	Julie Reimer-Marion; Saskatchewan	Teiewentsarihtha Rice; Eastern Door and the North	Cadence Whynacht; Nova Scotia
Girls' K1 1000 m	Cadence Whynacht; Nova Scotia	Teiewentsarihtha Rice; Eastern Door and the North	Julie Reimer-Marion; Saskatchewan
Girls' K1 3000 m	Cadence Whynacht; Nova Scotia	Teiewentsarihtha Rice; Eastern Door and the North	Julie Reimer-Marion; Saskatchewan
Mixed C2 1000 m	British Columbia; Mason Point; Vivianna Thomas	Eastern Door and the North; Teienerahtatenionkwas Goodleaf; Jaxton McComber	Eastern Door and the North; Teiakotsahon McComber; Shakohentinehtha Phillips
Mixed C2 3000 m	British Columbia; Mason Point; Vivianna Thomas	British Columbia; Zane Avery Jasper; Acacia Sylvester-Tom	Eastern Door and the North; Teienerahtatenionkwas Goodleaf; Jaxton McComber

16U

Event	Gold	Silver	Bronze
Boys' C2 1000 m	Eastern Door and the North; Rohsennakehte Lahache; Lanuhsisa'as McComber	Eastern Door and the North; Shakonikonhrawis Diabo; Cam White	Saskatchewan; Royce Charles; Shiloh Custer
Boys' C2 3000 m	British Columbia; Memphis Achilles Paul; Jacob James Seward	Eastern Door and the North; Rohsennakehte Lahache; Lanuhsisa'as McComber	Saskatchewan; Royce Charles; Shiloh Custer
Boys' C1 1000 m	Memphis Achilles Paul; British Columbia	Leywe' Smith; British Columbia	Cam White; Eastern Door and the North
Boys' C1 3000 m	Leywe' Smith; British Columbia	Jaxson Sockbeson; Maine	Dane Gibeault; Ontario
Boys' K1 200 m	Lanuhsisa'as McComber; Eastern Door and the North	Jacob James Seward; British Columbia	Cam White; Eastern Door and the North
Boys' K1 1000 m	Callum Whynacht; Nova Scotia	Lanuhsisa'as McComber; Eastern Door and the North	Jacob James Seward; British Columbia
Boys' K1 3000 m	Jacob James Seward; British Columbia	Cam White; Eastern Door and the North	Shakonikonhrawis Diabo; Eastern Door and the North
Girls' C2 1000 m	British Columbia; Autumn Jen Malloway; Jazzy Roberts	Eastern Door and the North; Kahawákhon Phillips; Falyn Iakorihwiióstha Two-Axe	Saskatchewan; Ava Sewap; Avery Sewap
Girls' C2 3000 m	Eastern Door and the North; Kahawákhon Phillips; Falyn Iakorihwiióstha Two-Axe	British Columbia; Autumn Jen Malloway; Jazzy Roberts	Saskatchewan; Cerise Charles; Ronisha McKay
Girls' C1 1000 m	Autumn Jen Malloway; British Columbia	Lauryanna Williams; British Columbia	Charisma Bercier; Manitoba
Girls' C1 3000 m	Autumn Jen Malloway; British Columbia	Leiara Frogg; Manitoba	Prezley Jobin; Yukon
Girls' K1 200 m	Falyn Iakorihwiióstha Two-Axe; Eastern Door and the North	Kahawákhon Phillips; Eastern Door and the North	Jazzy Roberts; British Columbia
Girls' K1 1000 m	Kahawákhon Phillips; Eastern Door and the North	Cadence Whynacht; Nova Scotia	Falyn Iakorihwiióstha Two-Axe; Eastern Door and the North
Mixed C2 1000 m	Eastern Door and the North; Lanuhsisa'as McComber; Falyn Iakorihwiióstha Two-Axe	British Columbia; Jazzy Roberts; Darnell Sylvester-Tom	Eastern Door and the North; Rohsennakehte Lahache; Kahawákhon Phillips
Mixed C2 3000 m	Eastern Door and the North; Lanuhsisa'as McComber; Falyn Iakorihwiióstha Two-Axe	British Columbia; Autumn Jen Malloway; Jacob James Seward	British Columbia; Memphis Achilles Paul; Jazzy Roberts

19U

Event	Gold	Silver	Bronze
Boys' C2 1000 m	Saskatchewan; Rustin Custer; Serge Custer	Eastern Door and the North; Rahahserenhawi Goodleaf; Rotshennón:ni Two-Axe	Saskatchewan; Klayton Linklater; Embry Roberts
Boys' C2 3000 m	Manitoba; Luke Enns; Robert Spence	Eastern Door and the North; Rahahserenhawi Goodleaf; Rotshennón:ni Two-Axe	Saskatchewan; Rustin Custer; Serge Custer
Boys' C2 6000 m	British Columbia; Cyrus George; Noah Gray	Saskatchewan; Rustin Custer; Serge Custer	Saskatchewan; Klayton Linklater; Embry Roberts
Boys' C1 1000 m	Al Wyse; British Columbia	William Baker; British Columbia	Embry Roberts; Saskatchewan
Boys' C1 3000 m	Rotshennón:ni Two-Axe; Eastern Door and the North	Noah Gray; British Columbia	Cyrus George; British Columbia
Boys' C1 6000 m	Al Wyse; British Columbia	Noah Gray; British Columbia	Cyrus George; British Columbia
Boys' K1 200 m	Luke Enns; Manitoba	Rotshennón:ni Two-Axe; Eastern Door and the North	Kona Lacroix; Saskatchewan
Boys' K1 1000 m	Luke Enns; Manitoba	Kona Lacroix; Saskatchewan	Rahahserenhawi Goodleaf; Eastern Door and the North
Boys' K1 3000 m	Luke Enns; Manitoba	Kona Lacroix; Saskatchewan	Cyrus George; British Columbia
Boys' K1 6000 m	Luke Enns; Manitoba	Kona Lacroix; Saskatchewan	not awarded
Girls' C2 1000 m	British Columbia; Ellashani Riella George; Syvawn Colleen Paul	Eastern Door and the North; Iontonwesenhstha Goodleaf; Jaidyn Tsakohawi Montour	British Columbia; Karalyn Morris; Madelyn Morris
Girls' C2 3000 m	Eastern Door and the North; Iontonwesenhstha Goodleaf; Jaidyn Tsakohawi Montour	British Columbia; Karalyn Morris; Madelyn Morris	British Columbia; Jasmine Commodore; Ellashani Riella George
Girls' C2 6000 m	British Columbia; Ellashani Riella George; Syvawn Colleen Paul	Eastern Door and the North; Iontonwesenhstha Goodleaf; Jaidyn Tsakohawi Montour	British Columbia; Karalyn Morris; Madelyn Morris
Girls' C1 1000 m	Syvawn Colleen Paul; British Columbia	Elena Deschambeault; Saskatchewan	Shaylisa Ballantyne; Saskatchewan
Girls' C1 3000 m	Elena Deschambeault; Saskatchewan	Karalyn Morris; British Columbia	Miah Chelsea-Anne John; British Columbia
Girls' C1 6000 m	Madelyn Morris; British Columbia	Syvawn Colleen Paul; British Columbia	Shaylisa Ballantyne; Saskatchewan
Girls' K1 200 m	Hannah Mills; Nova Scotia	Elia Bolme; Saskatchewan	Iontonwesenhstha Goodleaf; Eastern Door and the North
Girls' K1 1000 m	Hannah Mills; Nova Scotia	Elia Bolme; Saskatchewan	Iontonwesenhstha Goodleaf; Eastern Door and the North
Girls' K1 3000 m	Hannah Mills; Nova Scotia	Elia Bolme; Saskatchewan	Madelyn Morris; British Columbia
Girls' K1 6000 m	Hannah Mills; Nova Scotia	Elia Bolme; Saskatchewan	not awarded
Mixed C2 1000 m	Eastern Door and the North; Jaidyn Tsakohawi Montour; Rotshennón:ni Two-Axe	British Columbia; Ellashani Riella George; Noah Gray	Saskatchewan; Rustin Custer; Cathryn Michel
Mixed C2 3000 m	Eastern Door and the North; Iontonwesenhstha Goodleaf; Rotshennón:ni Two-Axe	British Columbia; Cyrus George; Syvawn Colleen Paul	British Columbia; Jasmine Commodore; Al Wyse
Mixed C2 6000 m	Saskatchewan; Rustin Custer; Elena Deschambeault	British Columbia; Cyrus George; Syvawn Colleen Paul	British Columbia; Ellashani Riella George; Noah Gray

=== Golf ===
Event	Gold	Silver	Bronze
16U boys	Adam Blair; Manitoba	Brody Brook; British Columbia	Payne Wood; Manitoba
16U girls	Emma Cunningham; Alberta	Mercedes St-Onge; Eastern Door and the North	Hailey Thunderchild; Saskatchewan
19U boys	Tehorahkwaneken Gary Albany; Eastern Door and the North	Solomon Ness; Saskatchewan	Cody Jolicoeur; Alberta
19U girls	Ashley Garland; Manitoba	Nakomis Mitchell; Minnesota	Cassidy Strongarm; Saskatchewan

=== Rifle shooting ===
16U

Event	Gold	Silver	Bronze
Boys' 3 positions	Zerick Dysart-Waterman; Manitoba	Cole Ratti; Saskatchewan	Kacey Fiddler; Saskatchewan
Boys' prone	Zerick Dysart-Waterman; Manitoba	Cole Ratti; Saskatchewan	Alexander Philip LeBarge; Yukon
Boys' overall	Zerick Dysart-Waterman; Manitoba	Cole Ratti; Saskatchewan	Alexander Philip LeBarge; Yukon
Girls' 3 positions	Willow Fayant-Velychko; Saskatchewan	Jorja Ameilia Jackson; Yukon	Amelia Gull; Ontario
Girls' prone	Jorja Ameilia Jackson; Yukon	Amelia Gull; Ontario	Jorja Bellmore-Smarch; Yukon
Girls' overall	Willow Fayant-Velychko; Saskatchewan	Jorja Ameilia Jackson; Yukon	Amelia Gull; Ontario

19U

Event	Gold	Silver	Bronze
Boys' 3 positions	Justin Johnson; Yukon	Cole Rabbitskin; Saskatchewan	Zachary Kakekaspan; Ontario
Boys' prone	Josh Jackson; Yukon	Justin Johnson; Yukon	Zachary Kakekaspan; Ontario
Boys' overall	Justin Johnson; Yukon	Josh Jackson; Yukon	Zachary Kakekaspan; Ontario
Girls' 3 positions	Ava Irving-Staley; Yukon	Inez Blind; Saskatchewan	Marissa Crouse; British Columbia
Girls' prone	Ava Irving-Staley; Yukon	Marissa Crouse; British Columbia	Inez Blind; Saskatchewan
Girls' overall	Ava Irving-Staley; Yukon	Marissa Crouse; British Columbia	Inez Blind; Saskatchewan

=== Soccer ===
Event	Gold	Silver	Bronze
16U boys	British Columbia	Alberta	Saskatchewan
16U girls	British Columbia	Saskatchewan	Alberta
19U boys	British Columbia	Manitoba	Ontario
19U girls	Alberta	Ontario	British Columbia

=== Softball ===
- Note, all finals for the softball tournament were cancelled as a result of the heavy rain on Saturday, July 22. All finals were declared with both teams winning golds and bronze.

Event	Gold	Silver	Bronze
16U boys	Manitoba; Saskatchewan		Ontario
16U girls	Manitoba; Ontario		British Columbia; Saskatchewan
19U boys	British Columbia; Nova Scotia		Alberta; Saskatchewan
19U girls	Manitoba; Nova Scotia		British Columbia; Ontario

=== Swimming ===
14U boys

Event	Gold	Silver	Bronze
50 m freestyle	Zachary Launière; Eastern Door and the North	Evan Beatty; Ontario	Kole Lizotte; Northwest Territories
100 m freestyle	Ben Capson; Ontario	Kirin Singh Bullock; British Columbia	Landon Kennedy; Saskatchewan
200 m freestyle	Kirin Singh Bullock; British Columbia	Ben Capson; Ontario	Wyland Dumont; British Columbia
400 m freestyle	Ben Capson; Ontario	Kirin Singh Bullock; British Columbia	Landon Kennedy; Saskatchewan
1500 m freestyle	Ben Capson; Ontario	Wyland Dumont; British Columbia	not awarded
50 m backstroke	Brady John Park; Alberta	Evan Beatty; Ontario	Zachary Launière; Eastern Door and the North
100 m backstroke	Brady John Park; Alberta	Evan Beatty; Ontario	Zachary Launière; Eastern Door and the North
200 m backstroke	Evan Beatty; Ontario	Brady John Park; Alberta	Zachary Launière; Eastern Door and the North
50 m breaststroke	Max Thille; Saskatchewan	Tristan Bear; Alberta	Jaxen Randy Garry Storey; Saskatchewan
100 m breaststroke	Max Thille; Saskatchewan	Tristan Bear; Alberta	Hudson Charron; Alberta
200 m breaststroke	Max Thille; Saskatchewan	Evan Beatty; Ontario	Eli Alexander Moulton; Newfoundland and Labrador
50 m butterfly	Kirin Singh Bullock; British Columbia	Landon Kennedy; Saskatchewan	Brady John Park; Alberta
100 m butterfly	Kirin Singh Bullock; British Columbia	Landon Kennedy; Saskatchewan	Ben Capson; Ontario
200 m butterfly	Kirin Singh Bullock; British Columbia	Landon Kennedy; Saskatchewan	Evan Beatty; Ontario
200 m individual medley	Ben Capson; Ontario	Landon Kennedy; Saskatchewan	Brady John Park; Alberta
4×50 m freestyle relay	Saskatchewan; Landon Kennedy; Jackson Pierre Mirasty; Jaxen Randy Garry Storey; Max Thille	Newfoundland and Labrador; Myles Arthur Michael Best; Isaiah Kristopher Coombs; Eli Alexander Moulton; Isaac Elliot Smith	not awarded
4×100 m freestyle relay	Saskatchewan; Landon Kennedy; Jackson Pierre Mirasty; Jaxen Randy Garry Storey; Max Thille	Newfoundland and Labrador; Myles Arthur Michael Best; Isaiah Kristopher Coombs; Eli Alexander Moulton; Isaac Elliot Smith	not awarded
4×50 m medley relay	Saskatchewan; Landon Kennedy; Jackson Pierre Mirasty; Jaxen Randy Garry Storey; Max Thille	Newfoundland and Labrador; Myles Arthur Michael Best; Isaiah Kristopher Coombs; Eli Alexander Moulton; Isaac Elliot Smith	not awarded

14U girls

Event	Gold	Silver	Bronze
50 m freestyle	Sophia Bekker; Alberta	Kennadi Vandenheuvel; Wisconsin	Niya Kashuba; British Columbia
100 m freestyle	Sophia Bekker; Alberta	Leelou Vollant; Eastern Door and the North	Maddy Scott-Nichols; Ontario
200 m freestyle	Sophia Bekker; Alberta	Kelana Marie Cottrell; British Columbia	Ella Lee Willmott; Ontario
400 m freestyle	Sophia Bekker; Alberta	Kelana Marie Cottrell; British Columbia	Ella Lee Willmott; Ontario
800 m freestyle	Sophia Bekker; Alberta	Maddy Scott-Nichols; Ontario	Kyla Marshall; British Columbia
50 m backstroke	Leelou Vollant; Eastern Door and the North	Niya Kashuba; British Columbia	Ali Marie Page; Ontario
100 m backstroke	Niya Kashuba; British Columbia	Leelou Vollant; Eastern Door and the North	Sophie Marshall; Manitoba
200 m backstroke	Niya Kashuba; British Columbia	Sophie Marshall; Manitoba	Destiny Castagna; Alberta
50 m breaststroke	Brooke Peloquin; Manitoba	Ella Lee Willmott; Ontario	Kaylee Dugas; New Brunswick
100 m breaststroke	Ella Lee Willmott; Ontario	Brooke Peloquin; Manitoba	Reese Vandenheuvel; Wisconsin
200 m breaststroke	Ella Lee Willmott; Ontario	Brooke Peloquin; Manitoba	Kennadi Vandenheuvel; Wisconsin
50 m butterfly	Kelana Marie Cottrell; British Columbia	Leelou Vollant; Eastern Door and the North	Reese Vandenheuvel; Wisconsin
100 m butterfly	Maddy Scott-Nichols; Ontario	Kelana Marie Cottrell; British Columbia	Leelou Vollant; Eastern Door and the North
200 m butterfly	Kelana Marie Cottrell; British Columbia	Maddy Scott-Nichols; Ontario	Erika Metallic; New Brunswick
200 m individual medley	Brooke Peloquin; Manitoba	Maddy Scott-Nichols; Ontario	Reese Vandenheuvel; Wisconsin
4×50 m freestyle relay	Ontario; Matilda Gordon; Ali Marie Page; Maddy Scott-Nichols; Ella Lee Willmott	Manitoba; Mila Gaslard; Sophie Marshall; Isabelle McKechnie; Brooke Peloquin	Newfoundland and Labrador; Rebekah Catherine Adey; Claire Jessie Crocker; Maria Elizabeth Parsons; Katie Turner
4×100 m freestyle relay	Ontario; Matilda Gordon; Ali Marie Page; Maddy Scott-Nichols; Ella Lee Willmott	Manitoba; Mila Gaslard; Sophie Marshall; Isabelle McKechnie; Brooke Peloquin	Newfoundland and Labrador; Rebekah Catherine Adey; Claire Jessie Crocker; Maria Elizabeth Parsons; Katie Turner
4×50 m medley relay	Ontario; Matilda Gordon; Ali Marie Page; Maddy Scott-Nichols; Ella Lee Willmott	British Columbia; Kelana Marie Cottrell; Elise Mackenzie Jonasson; Niya Kashuba; Kyla Marshall	Newfoundland and Labrador; Rebekah Catherine Adey; Claire Jessie Crocker; Maria Elizabeth Parsons; Katie Turner

16U boys

Event	Gold	Silver	Bronze
50 m freestyle	Keegan MacDougall; Prince Edward Island	Mark Addison; New Brunswick	Gideon Paul; Nova Scotia
100 m freestyle	Keegan MacDougall; Prince Edward Island	Corbin Jackson; Yukon	Mark Addison; New Brunswick
200 m freestyle	Tuja Tomah Dreyer; Yukon	Preston Seneviratne; British Columbia	Gabriel Lavigne; Nova Scotia
400 m freestyle	Preston Seneviratne; British Columbia	Keegan MacDougall; Prince Edward Island	Gabriel Lavigne; Nova Scotia
1500 m freestyle	Gabriel Lavigne; Nova Scotia	Mark Addison; New Brunswick	Jacob Schneider; British Columbia
50 m backstroke	Corbin Jackson; Yukon	Gideon Paul; Nova Scotia	Riley Anderson; Manitoba
100 m backstroke	Preston Seneviratne; British Columbia	Keegan MacDougall; Prince Edward Island	Gideon Paul; Nova Scotia
200 m backstroke	Tuja Tomah Dreyer; Yukon	Preston Seneviratne; British Columbia	Cash Harley Frank Drager; Saskatchewan
50 m breaststroke	Landon Davis Dubiel; Saskatchewan	Corbin Jackson; Yukon	Evan Wagner; Ontario
100 m breaststroke	Landon Davis Dubiel; Saskatchewan	Corbin Jackson; Yukon	Evan Wagner; Ontario
200 m breaststroke	Keegan MacDougall; Prince Edward Island	Landon Davis Dubiel; Saskatchewan	Evan Wagner; Ontario
50 m butterfly	Tuja Tomah Dreyer; Yukon	Corbin Jackson; Yukon	Gabriel Lavigne; Nova Scotia
100 m butterfly	Tuja Tomah Dreyer; Yukon	Preston Seneviratne; British Columbia	Corbin Jackson; Yukon
200 m butterfly	Tuja Tomah Dreyer; Yukon	Jacob Schneider; British Columbia	Landon Davis Dubiel; Saskatchewan
200 m individual medley	Tuja Tomah Dreyer; Yukon	Preston Seneviratne; British Columbia	Keegan MacDougall; Prince Edward Island
4×50 m freestyle relay	Ontario; Evan Beatty; Frédéric Dumoulin; Jack Lloyd Gollan; Evan Wagner	British Columbia; Kirin Singh Bullock; Wyland Lee Dumont Dumont; Torrun Luis Maurice; Jacob Schneider	Manitoba; Dean Anderson; Riley Anderson; Hayden Bowman; Harrison Parboosingh
4×100 m freestyle relay	Manitoba; Dean Anderson; Riley Anderson; Hayden Bowman; Harrison Parboosingh	Ontario; Evan Beatty; Frédéric Dumoulin; Jack Lloyd Gollan; Evan Wagner	British Columbia; Kirin Singh Bullock; Wyland Lee Dumont Dumont; Torrun Luis Maurice; Jacob Schneider
4×50 m medley relay	British Columbia; Kirin Singh Bullock; Wyland Lee Dumont Dumont; Jacob Schneider; Preston Seneviratne	not awarded	not awarded

16U girls

Event	Gold	Silver	Bronze
50 m freestyle	Annabelle Jackson; Ontario	Victoria Darling; Saskatchewan	Jorja Danielle Desjardins; Prince Edward Island
100 m freestyle	Abigail Grace Duvall; Ontario	Breanna Aimoe; British Columbia	Annabelle Jackson; Ontario
200 m freestyle	Abigail Grace Duvall; Ontario	Breanna Aimoe; British Columbia	Maia Misipisiw Hideg; California
400 m freestyle	Breanna Aimoe; British Columbia	Abigail Grace Duvall; Ontario	Maia Misipisiw Hideg; California
800 m freestyle	Abigail Grace Duvall; Ontario	Tehya Dickson; Alberta	Victoria Darling; Saskatchewan
50 m backstroke	Abigail Fellinger; Ontario	Kallie Nicole Badry; British Columbia	Emersynn Renee Lamabe; Alberta
100 m backstroke	Abigail Fellinger; Ontario	Annabelle Jackson; Ontario	Maia Misipisiw Hideg; California
200 m backstroke	Annabelle Jackson; Ontario	Kallie Nicole Badry; British Columbia	Harmony Isaac-Gedeon; New Brunswick
50 m breaststroke	Breanna Aimoe; British Columbia	Victoria Darling; Saskatchewan	Luna Abbott; Ontario
100 m breaststroke	Abigail Fellinger; Ontario	Victoria Darling; Saskatchewan	Kallie Nicole Badry; British Columbia
200 m breaststroke	Abigail Fellinger; Ontario	Tehya Dickson; Alberta	Kallie Nicole Badry; British Columbia
50 m butterfly	Annabelle Jackson; Ontario	Breanna Aimoe; British Columbia	Maia Misipisiw Hideg; California
100 m butterfly	Abigail Grace Duvall; Ontario	Macy Giroux; Alberta	Mira Vienna Kiefer; Saskatchewan
200 m butterfly	Macy Giroux; Alberta	not awarded	not awarded
200 m individual medley	Breanna Aimoe; British Columbia	Abigail Fellinger; Ontario	Maia Misipisiw Hideg; California
4×50 m freestyle relay	Ontario; Luna Abbott; Abigail Grace Duvall; Abigail Fellinger; Annabelle Jackson	British Columbia; Kallie Nicole Badry; Kelana Marie Cottrell; Breanna Aimoe; Niya Kashuba	Saskatchewan; Elizabeth Colenutt; Victoria Darling; Ali Diehl; Mira Vienna Kiefer
4×100 m freestyle relay	Ontario; Luna Abbott; Abigail Grace Duvall; Abigail Fellinger; Annabelle Jackson	British Columbia; Kallie Nicole Badry; Kelana Marie Cottrell; Breanna Aimoe; Niya Kashuba	Saskatchewan; Elizabeth Colenutt; Victoria Darling; Ali Diehl; Mira Vienna Kiefer
4×50 m medley relay	Ontario; Luna Abbott; Abigail Grace Duvall; Abigail Fellinger; Annabelle Jackson	Alberta; Grace Rita Auger; Macy Giroux; Emersynn Renee Lamabe; Grace Laybourne	Saskatchewan; Elizabeth Colenutt; Victoria Darling; Ali Diehl; Mira Vienna Kiefer

19U boys

Event	Gold	Silver	Bronze
50 m freestyle	Camren Courchene-Carter; Ontario	Griffin Nielsen-Sendey; British Columbia	Jacob Savage Cameron; Saskatchewan
100 m freestyle	Camren Courchene-Carter; Ontario	Evan Thomas; Ontario	Griffin Nielsen-Sendey; British Columbia
200 m freestyle	Jadyn Johnston; British Columbia	Evan Thomas; Ontario	Jack Addison; New Brunswick
400 m freestyle	Jadyn Johnston; British Columbia	Evan Thomas; Ontario	Jack Addison; New Brunswick
1500 m freestyle	Joseph Sumner; Manitoba	Jack Addison; New Brunswick	Griffin Nielsen-Sendey; British Columbia
50 m backstroke	Benjamin Schell; Ontario	Jack Addison; New Brunswick	Levi Alvin Dickson; Alberta
100 m backstroke	Benjamin Schell; Ontario	Levi Alvin Dickson; Alberta	Jacob Mitchener; Northwest Territories
200 m backstroke	Jadyn Johnston; British Columbia	Benjamin Schell; Ontario	Levi Alvin Dickson; Alberta
50 m breaststroke	Camren Courchene-Carter; Ontario	Damian Chartrand; Saskatchewan	Allan Reginald Hancock; Newfoundland and Labrador
100 m breaststroke	Camren Courchene-Carter; Ontario	Damian Chartrand; Saskatchewan	Jacob Sheppard; Newfoundland and Labrador
200 m breaststroke	Camren Courchene-Carter; Ontario	Damian Chartrand; Saskatchewan	Benjamin Schell; Ontario
50 m butterfly	Evan Thomas; Ontario	Griffin Nielsen-Sendey; British Columbia	Jacob Mitchener; Northwest Territories
100 m butterfly	Evan Thomas; Ontario	Jadyn Johnston; British Columbia	Griffin Nielsen-Sendey; British Columbia
200 m butterfly	Jadyn Johnston; British Columbia	Evan Thomas; Ontario	Griffin Nielsen-Sendey; British Columbia
200 m individual medley	Jadyn Johnston; British Columbia	Camren Courchene-Carter; Ontario	Jacob Mitchener; Northwest Territories
4×50 m freestyle relay	Yukon; Tuja Tomah Dreyer; Corbin Jackson; Reese Jackson; Issac Powell	Newfoundland and Labrador; Allan Reginald Hancock; Aaron Porter; Jacob Sheppard; Christian Strickland	not awarded
4×100 m freestyle relay	Ontario; Ben Capson; Camren Courchene-Carter; Benjamin Schell; Evan Thomas	British Columbia; Jadyn Johnston; Griffin Nielsen-Sendey; Preston Seneviratne; Isaiah Trites	Saskatchewan; Jacob Savage Cameron; Damian Chartrand; Landon Davis Dubiel; Staley Lowell Oftebro
4×50 m medley relay	Ontario; Camren Courchene-Carter; Jeremy McDaniel; Benjamin Schell; Evan Thomas	Saskatchewan; Jacob Savage Cameron; Damian Chartrand; Landon Davis Dubiel; Staley Lowell Oftebro	Alberta; Hudson Charron; Levi Alvin Dickson; Brady John Park; Tristan Petryshen-Kozak

19U girls

Event	Gold	Silver	Bronze
50 m freestyle	Abishea Winnicki; Wisconsin	Ava Pauly; Haudenosaunee	Ayiana June Gagne; Ontario
100 m freestyle	Abishea Winnicki; Wisconsin	Kassua Gínnet’ā; Yukon	Morgan Langford; British Columbia
200 m freestyle	Abishea Winnicki; Wisconsin	Ayiana June Gagne; Ontario	Morgan Langford; British Columbia
400 m freestyle	Kassua Gínnet’ā; Yukon	Izzy Seneviratne; British Columbia	Ayiana June Gagne; Ontario
800 m freestyle	Izzy Seneviratne; British Columbia	Ayiana June Gagne; Ontario	Elaine Clark; Alberta
50 m backstroke	Morgan Langford; British Columbia	Chloe Meredith-Jensen; British Columbia	Madeline Koropatniski; British Columbia
100 m backstroke	Abishea Winnicki; Wisconsin	Morgan Langford; British Columbia	Chloe Meredith-Jensen; British Columbia
200 m backstroke	Morgan Langford; British Columbia	Madeline Koropatniski; British Columbia	Ayiana June Gagne; Ontario
50 m breaststroke	Calli Anne Giroux; Alberta	Ava Pauly; Haudenosaunee	Ayiana June Gagne; Ontario
100 m breaststroke	Ava Pauly; Haudenosaunee	Calli Anne Giroux; Alberta	Abishea Winnicki; Wisconsin
200 m breaststroke	Calli Anne Giroux; Alberta	Ava Pauly; Haudenosaunee	Chloe Meredith-Jensen; British Columbia
50 m butterfly	Izzy Seneviratne; British Columbia	Elena Park; Saskatchewan	Ashlyn Meisner; Prince Edward Island
100 m butterfly	Kassua Gínnet’ā; Yukon	Izzy Seneviratne; British Columbia	Izzi Zablocki; Wisconsin
200 m butterfly	Kassua Gínnet’ā; Yukon	Izzy Seneviratne; British Columbia	Izzi Zablocki; Wisconsin
200 m individual medley	Abishea Winnicki; Wisconsin	Ava Pauly; Haudenosaunee	Morgan Langford; British Columbia
4×50 m freestyle relay	British Columbia; Madeline Koropatniski; Morgan Langford; Chloe Meredith-Jensen; Izzy Seneviratne	Wisconsin; Allison Girioux; Reese Vandenheuvel; Abishea Winnicki; Izzi Zablocki	Alberta; Destiny Castagna; Abbie Cottingham; Macy Giroux; Elle MacIntosh
4×100 m freestyle relay	British Columbia; Madeline Koropatniski; Morgan Langford; Chloe Meredith-Jensen; Izzy Seneviratne	Wisconsin; Allison Girioux; Reese Vandenheuvel; Abishea Winnicki; Izzi Zablocki	Alberta; Sophia Bekker; Elaine Clark; Tehya Dickson; Calli Anne Giroux
4×50 m medley relay	British Columbia; Madeline Koropatniski; Morgan Langford; Chloe Meredith-Jensen; Izzy Seneviratne	Alberta; Sophia Bekker; Elaine Clark; Tehya Dickson; Calli Anne Giroux	Wisconsin; Allison Girioux; Kennadi Vandenheuvel; Reese Vandenheuvel; Izzi Zablocki

=== Volleyball ===
Event	Gold	Silver	Bronze
16U boys	Manitoba; Bailey Tacanwaste; Cédric Saurette; Demitri Munroe; Gabriel Beaudin; Jaxen Muswagon; Hunter Oleschak; Tristan Cousineau; Colin Vermette; Logan Barnabe; Owen Giesbrecht; Kingston Thomas; Brock Eastman	Saskatchewan	Alberta; Kentyn Daniel Allakariallak; Joshua Andrew Berland; Kashis Boucher-Lizotte; Chasetin Douglas Clarke; Gavyn Dion; Jeresyn Francis; Kaiden Gray; Ryder Izaya Greyeyes; Reegan Jamie Lapatak; Mac Ben Lario; Ryder Sabiston; Jace Laboucane
16U girls	Wisconsin; Kendra Wolf; Isabel Young; Lucy Young; Isabella Evangelene Falcon; Tatanka ska win Big Eagle; Aubrey Corn; Alexis Zhuckkahosee; Rylie Kakwitch; Samantha Wilber; Jayda Livingston	Manitoba; Rihanna Rudolph; Summer Cadotte; Ryann Hay; Macie Urban; Alyssa Cador; Lanie Murdock; Jessalyn Mecas; Madison Richard; Kaitlyn Tanner; Tayah-Rae Morrisseau; Demeraye Clearsky-Meeches; Ryley Ouellette	Saskatchewan
19U boys	Alberta; Jacob Jonathan Courtoreille; Reyhan Jovan Dion; Jackson McGillivray; Rayden McGillivray; Gavin James Moes; Jerelus Francis; Alexander Jonn Baird; Dylan MacIntyre; Thomas Brian Ib Froberg; David James Villiger; Lachlan Lee; Nate Lucas Callihoo	Manitoba; André Turenne; Justice Roulston; Tristyn M'Lot; Joshua Wilson; Nolan Ducharme; Kyle Keno; Kobe Shorting; Leiland Parenteau; Maxime Vermette; Samuel Gurke; Levi Johnston; Wizdom Smith	Saskatchewan
19U girls	Saskatchewan; Addysen Noble; Mya Lavallee; Kwyn Tournier; Cassidy Schrader; Rosetta Cyr; Heidi Regnier; Kenna Courtney Bouvier; Summer Watson; Gracie Flett; Taliah Kaiswatum	Wisconsin; Coral Cook; Kaitlyn Wolf; Kaelyn Yvonne Chasenah; Arvina Martin; Jaeleigh Blackdeer; Alezaha King; Emma James; Jadynn Gruner; Karah Latender; McKenzie Gruner; Jazzlynn Oshkosh; Cayley Chapman	Alberta; Samantha Langdon; Jade Longlad; Megan Kendziora; Kahlan McDonald; Katie Nashim; Lexis Anne Ouellette; Erin Noskey; Stephanie Kendziora; Zoe Jacqueline MacLellan; Savannah Lambert; Carly Nicole Hawryluk; Emma Bernadette Laybourne

=== Wrestling ===
Event	Gold	Silver	Bronze
Boys' 52 kg	Ethan Chase; New Brunswick	Ryker Shingchek; Wisconsin	Jonah Sanderson; Saskatchewan
Boys' 58 kg	Eekee Avalak; Nunavut	Jerin Coles; Manitoba	Brexden Kane; Wisconsin
Boys' 66 kg	Nikola Coles; Manitoba	Elias Glinski; Wisconsin	Gregory Turney III; Wisconsin
Boys' 74 kg	Beau Chartrand; Manitoba	Thayer Komakjuak; Nunavut	Jerome Labarge; Wisconsin
Boys' 80 kg	Donovan Vigue; Wisconsin	Draeden Berry; Alberta	Devlin Vele; Wisconsin
Boys' 90 kg	Leonard Chosa; Wisconsin	Wakaluhya' ta*ko Smith; Wisconsin	Caylixx Starr; Saskatchewan
Boys' 100 kg	Ajay Guitard; Ontario	Landon Saglin; Wisconsin	Wahkeenyah Waukau; Wisconsin
Boys' 115 kg	Gunnar Crowe; Wisconsin	Gabe Forsyth; Ontario	Andrew Worm; Saskatchewan
Boys' 130 kg	Hayden Wilson; Ontario	Owen Ferchuk; Saskatchewan	Esaube Brown; Wisconsin
Girls' 46 kg	Sarah Jones; Ontario	Hailey Mateush; Saskatchewan	Heidi Halcrow; Manitoba
Girls' 52 kg	Kaura Coles; Manitoba	Jadyn Begay; New Mexico	Madelynn Trew; Saskatchewan
Girls' 58 kg	Kayley Clarke; Saskatchewan	Mayja Cardinal; Alberta	Devynn Manning; Ontario
Girls' 64 kg	Anaka Chartrand; Manitoba	Margret Bruneau; Manitoba	Brooklyn Dieter; Saskatchewan
Girls' 70 kg	Danyka Mikyl LaBelle; Alberta	Tiani Lemieux; Wisconsin	Jade Shalton; Ontario
Girls' 76 kg	Shelby Guerin-Daniels; Saskatchewan	Fayth Pontious; British Columbia	Austyn LaBelle; Alberta
Girls' 82 kg	Leliana Delegarito; New Mexico	Michelle Omand; Manitoba	Ava Hamelin; Eastern Door and the North
Girls' 88 kg	Olivia Rose; Saskatchewan	Kayel LaBelle; Alberta	not awarded
Girls' 95 kg	Nevaeh Pine; Ontario	Kylie George; Saskatchewan	not awarded
Girls' 105 kg	Madison Burns; Wisconsin	Marlee Boucha; Ontario	not awarded
