= Alexey Kylasov =

Russian, cultural anthropologist (born 1968)

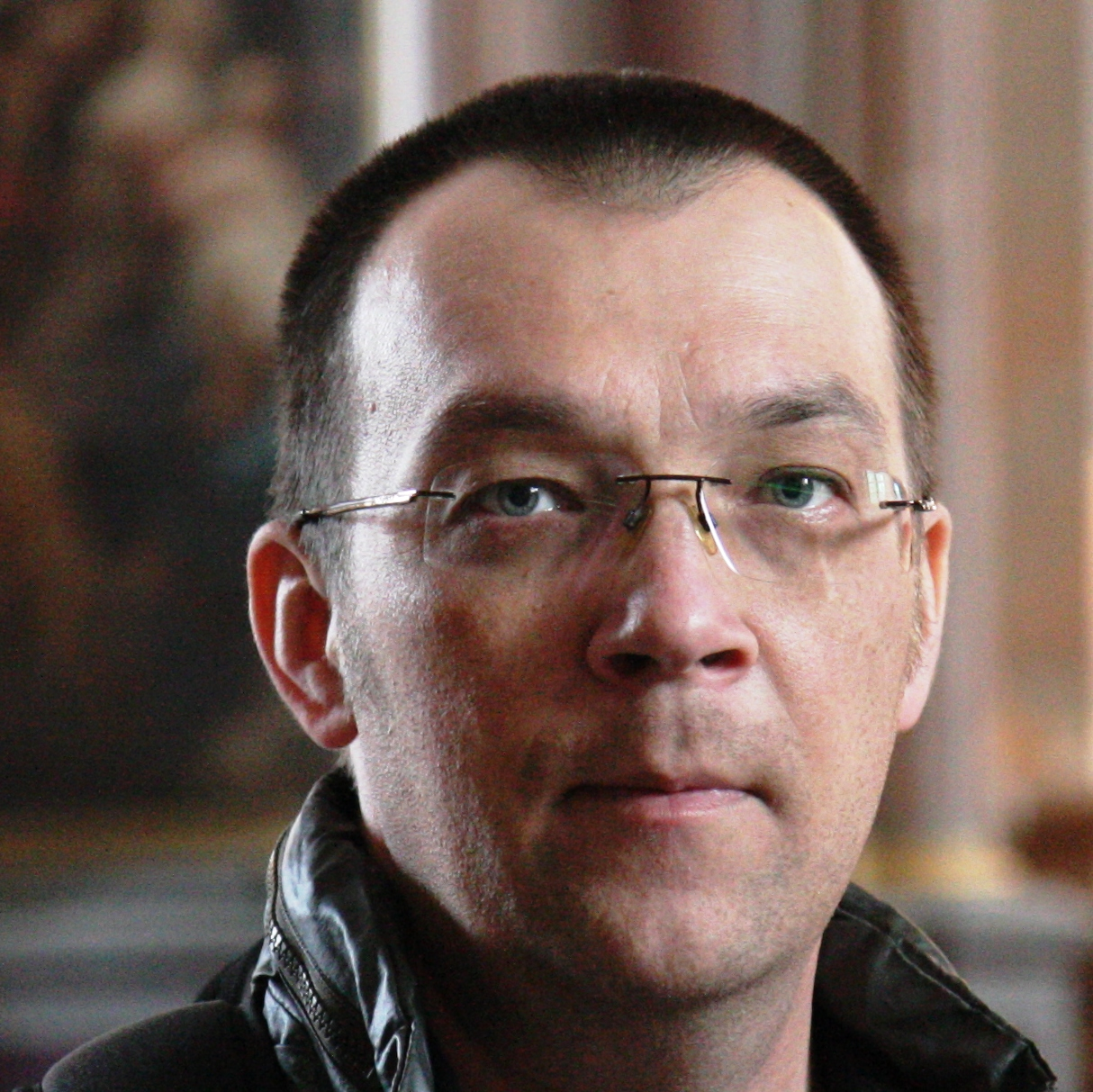
- Born: 9 May 1968 (age 58); Krasnokamsk, Perm Krai, Russia

Philosophical work
- Main interests: Cultural anthropology, sport
- Notable ideas: Tradition; indigenous peoples; globalization; traditional games; ethnosport theory

Alexey Valeryevich Kylasov (born May 9, 1968) is a Russian cultural anthropologist and Ethnosport theory author.

== Education and academic career ==
Kylasov first became interested internal affairs as a network of sport, and was particularly interested in the modern institutions of traditional games. He attended Perm State Pedagogical University, where he received a Master of History in 2007 and in the State Academy of Slavic Culture (Moscow) postgraduate in 2011 where defend dissertation “Sport as a social and cultural phenomenon of the globalization epoch” and received PhD degree in Cultural anthropology. He subsequently became a lecturer at Plekhanov Russian Economic University, Moscow State Academy of Physical Culture. In 2010 he was research scholar of Sport Anthropology Laboratory of the Russian Sport Science Institute. As of 2010, he served as Vice-rector of Churapcha State Institute for Sport and Physical Culture in the Sakha Republic and as advisor of vice-president of the Sakha (Yakutia) Republic. In 2009 he joined the International Society of Olympic Historians as member. He is also a member of the scientific council of the Russian Academy of Sciences on studying and protection of a natural and cultural heritage from 2012. He is also the vice-president of Cricket Russia since 2011.

== Sport and public career ==
Kylasov held several positions as member at sport organizations worldwide, was awarded honorary title "Pioneer of Sport for All" (2007). He became the initiator and founder of the Multisport Association of Russia of the national level partner of the Association of IOC Recognised International Sports Federations their activity within cooperation with federations of non-Olympic sports has served adjustment of the relations with International Mind Sports Association and The Association For International Sport for All (TAFISA). He has headed delegations of Russia on the 2008 first World Mind Sports Games in Beijing and the 2008 IV World Sport for All Games TAFISA were Russia took part first time. During the 2006-2011 he chaired the Olympic Task Force Committee of the Federation of International Bandy. The object of the committee was to indicate a direction for including bandy in the great multisport event, as result bandy was in the program of 2011 Asian Winter Games in Astana and Almaty. The important role in formation of empirical base of the ethnosport theory was introduced by participation of the author in reforming of the International Federation of Associated Wrestling Styles (FILA) proclaimed unity of all wrestling styles. In structure of federation the special body of FILA World Traditional Wrestling Committee has been based, Kylasov became one of founders of this committee and its member.

== Theory ==
In the monograph Ringy Sport: Source and Sense of Modern Olympics (2010) it has critically comprehended the Olympic movement where has described inevitable change of institutes of modern sports, its structures and expansion of the used conceptual device in favor of encouragement cultural diversity of the being globalized world. These conclusions became a basis of the ethnosport theory which serves design and forecasting of processes of formation and functioning of social and cultural systems in the conditions of being formed trends of ethnic cultural representation in sports (Ethnocultural diversity of sport, 2011). In full the ethnosport theory left the separate book in 2012 it the UNESCO greetings. As the adviser of the IMSA President Kylasov has offered a method of integrative association of mind sports, it has proved need of such scientific approach interpersonal and transpersonal social behavior of players of logic games and aspects of conscious and unconscious acts of their interaction. The appeal to transpersonal aspect has allowed designating ways for psychology return to the subject and, the most important, to spiritual and existential problems of human life during an era of a total computerization. Results of researches are published in article "Mind Games" in the Encyclopedia of Life Support Systems (EOLSS) of UNESCO (2011).

== Works ==
- Кыласов А.В. Religio athletae, или Культурно-религиозная сущность олимпизма // Вестник спортивной науки, 2009, №5. – С. 55–58.
- Кыласов А.В. Идея олимпизма в контексте глобализации // Вестник спортивной науки, 2009, №6. – С. 64–66.
- Монография: Кыласов А.В. Окольцованный спорт. Истоки и смысл современного олимпизма. – М.: АИРО XXI, 2010. – 328 С. ISBN 978-5-91022-107-3
- Кыласов А.В., Гавров, С.Н. Этнокультурное многообразие – новая парадигма в развитии спорта // V Международный конгресс «Человек, спорт, здоровье» 21–23 апреля 2011 года, Санкт-Петербург, Россия: Материалы конгресса / под ред. В.А. Таймазова. – СПб: Олимп-СПб, 2011. – С. 161–163.
- Kylasov, A., Gavrov, S. Ethnocultural diversity of sport // Encyclopedia of Life Support Systems (EOLSS). Sport Science. – UNESCO/EOLSS, Magister-press, 2011. – P. 462–491
- Kylasov, A., Garcés, D. Mind Games // Encyclopedia of Life Support Systems (EOLSS). Sport Science. – UNESCO/EOLSS, Magister-press, 2011. – P. 727–743.
- Кыласов А.В. Методология и терминология этноспорта // Вестник спортивной науки, 2011, No.5. – С. 41–43.
- Кыласов А.В. Теория этноспорта: монография [Текст] / А. Кыласов. - М.: Советский спорт, 2012. - 112 с. ISBN 978-5-9718-0162-7
