= Inter Tribal Council =

Brazilian indigenous peoples NGO

The Inter Tribal Council or Intertribal Committee (ITC) (Portuguese: Comitê Intertribal Memória e Ciência Indígena) is a Brazilian indigenous peoples NGO founded in 1991. It asserts that the first step to fighting discrimination is to ensure access to peoples' rights to health, education, opportunity and cultural dialogue as well as their rights to their lands.

== Activities ==
The ITC participated in the drafting of UN initiatives on indigenous peoples inclusion in the information society. ITC participated in the Convention on Biological Diversity COP 8 Conference in Curitiba, Brazil, and, in 2006, participated in the I Regional Conference of the Americas against Racism and Racial Discrimination and against All Forms of Discrimination and Intolerance in Brasília.

=== Events ===
In 1992, the ITC was a primary organizer for the World Conference of Indigenous Peoples on Territory, Environment and Development, which was held at Kari Oca the week prior to the United Nations Conference on Environment and Development in Rio.

The ITC founded the Jogos dos Povos Indígenas (Indigenous Peoples' Games), which has been held in Brazil since 1996 along with the parallel Indigenous Social Forum

ITC organized the first World Indigenous Games, which was held in Brazil in 2015.
