= Mas-wrestling =

Yakut ethnosport

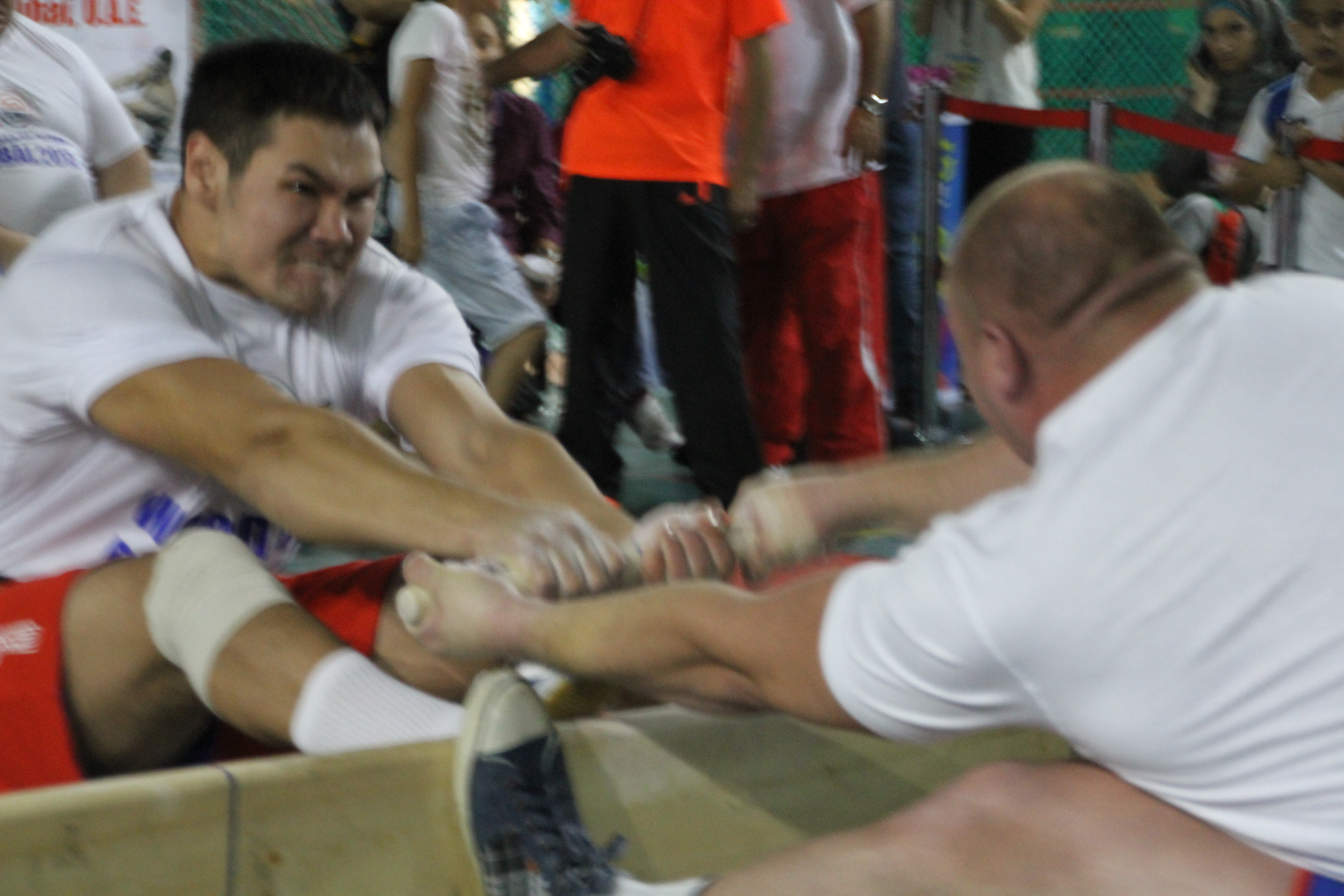
2014 Russian national championship in Moscow.

Mas-wrestling (Russian: Мас-рестлинг) is the international name used for the Yakut ethnosport derived from the traditional stick pulling game mas tard'yhyy (мас тардыhыы, 'stick tugging'). Reminiscent of the Eskimo Stick Pull featured at the World Eskimo Indian Olympics, Norwegian kjevletrekk, Finnish kartunveto or väkikapulan veto, as well as the Highland test of strength The Swingle Tree (played with a shepherd's crook), participants taking part in mas-wrestling competitions sit in front of each other, prop their feet against the board that divides the competition area and tug on a wooden stick (mas), making sure to keep it parallel to the propping board. Mas-wrestling demands great muscular strength from the hands, legs, back, and abdominals.

== Rules ==
The athlete that wins the coin toss chooses the stick hold position (internal or external for the first match), and the one who chooses the external hold, shows his position (left or right) and has no right to change it. In second match the grip is reversed/switched (internal/external), and if third match is necessary, another coin toss. The stick must be over the board and parallel to it, hands and fingers are not to overlap. Victory is declared when a contestant manages to pull his opponent over the board and keep the stick in his hands.

The elimination tournament format in separate weight divisions also has a bonus point system:

- Win 2–0 and receive 3 bonus points
- Win 2–1 and receive 2 bonus points
- Lose 1–2 and receive 1 bonus point

== History ==
It was a common hobby amongst sailors, and therefore variants of mas-wrestling can be found throughout Alaska and Northern Europe. The game was especially common in these areas throughout the 19th century.

The sport was registered by the All-Russia Sports Registry (VRVS) in 2003 and has been governed by the International Mas-Wrestling Federation (registered in Latvia). The World Strongman Federation started including mas-wrestling as an event, stick pulling, at the strongman competition in December 2011. The first United States Open tournament was held in June 2013.
