= North American Indigenous Games =

Multi-sport event

The North American Indigenous Games is a multi-sport event involving indigenous North American athletes staged intermittently since 1990. The games are governed by the North American Indigenous Games Council, a 26-member council of representatives from 13 provinces and territories in Canada and 13 regions in the United States.

== History ==
In 1971, the Native Summer Games held in Enoch, Alberta, Canada drew 3,000 participants competing in 13 sports and many cultural events.

In 1973, the Western Canada Native Winter Games were held on the Blood Reserve in Kainai, Alberta, Canada.

In 1975, a meeting of the National Indian Athletic Association was held in Reno, Nevada, where it was decided to organize games for indigenous peoples. John Fletcher, a Peigan from Edmonton, Alberta, Canada, and Willie Littlechild, a Cree of the Ermineskin Tribe at Hobbema, Alberta, Canada, attended; John Fletcher is credited for his support towards having the games, as presented by Mr. Littlechild.

In 1977, the idea to host large-scale indigenous games took another step forward in Sweden at the Annual Assembly of the World Council of Indigenous Peoples. Willie Littlechild presented the motion to host international indigenous games. It was unanimously passed. A Brazilian elder was reportedly so moved by this that he presented Willie Littlechild with a war arrow representing peace in his tribe. Advising it be pointed to the ground, this arrow would direct anything evil toward the underground. It is now part of the sacred ceremonial run.

The goal of the games was to improve the quality of life for indigenous peoples by supporting self-determined sports and cultural activities.

Former Chairperson Charles Wood stated "The vision of the NAIG, from the very beginning, along with my brothers, Willie Littlechild of Ermineskin First Nation at Hobbema, and Big John Fletcher of Peigan in Southern Alberta, was one of our interest and concern about what was happening among the young people in all of our communities. . . We took it upon ourselves to try and find something constructive for the young people to look forward to. And, what it was eventually, was that we would put together a plan for a Games through which the young Aboriginal people could come together to excel in their athletic field of endeavour and to come together to do other things: to make new friendships, to renew old ones, and so on..."

The first North American Indigenous Games (or "NAIG") were held in 1990 in Edmonton, Alberta, followed by Prince Albert, Saskatchewan, in 1993, Blaine, Minnesota, in 1995, Victoria, British Columbia, in 1997, Winnipeg, Manitoba, in 2002, Denver, Colorado, in 2006 and Cowichan, British Columbia, in 2008. The 2011 games were to be held in Milwaukee, Wisconsin, but about a year before the games were to be held, Milwaukee withdrew its host application due to the lack of financial backers. Other arrangements, however, were made, and games were indeed held in Milwaukee in July 2011 on a smaller scale (dubbed the United States Indigenous Games). The 2014 games took place in Regina, Saskatchewan followed by the 2017 games in Toronto, Ontario.

In the 2006 games, 10,000 athletes from the United States and Canada took part with more than 1,000 tribes represented. In addition to sporting events, the games included a parade and a variety of cultural performances. The opening ceremonies were held at Invesco Field at Mile High and the closing ceremonies were held at Skyline Park.

Approximately 5,000 athletes from the United States and Canada took part in the 2014 games, in Regina, Saskatchewan, (July 20–27, 2014) with more than 756 tribes represented. In addition to sporting events, the games included a large cultural village at the First Nations University of Canada and a variety of cultural performances throughout the host city. The opening ceremonies were held at Mosaic Stadium at Taylor Field and the closing ceremonies were held at the First Nations University of Canada campus. A large and violent storm went through the cultural village on July 24, nearly destroying everything except for the tipis. Later, over 300 volunteers worked through the night to clean it up in time for the following days activities.

== Editions ==
Edition	Year	Host	Location	Notes	Results	Overall winner
1	1990	Canada	Edmonton, Alberta	First NAIG, 3,000 participants in 15 sports	37 cultural groups and ceremonial run	Team Saskatchewan
2	1993	Canada	Prince Albert, Saskatchewan	4,400 participants in 15 sports	Traditional powwow	Team Saskatchewan
3	1995	United States	Blaine, Minnesota	8,500 participants in 17 sports	2,500 cultural performers	Team Saskatchewan
4	1997	Canada	Victoria, British Columbia	5,000 participants in 16 sports	3,000 cultural participants	Team Saskatchewan
5	2002	Canada	Winnipeg, Manitoba	6,500 participants in 16 sports	3,000 cultural participants	Team Manitoba
6	2006	United States	Denver, Colorado	10,000 participants in 16 sports		Team Saskatchewan
7	2008	Canada	Cowichan, British Columbia	4,700 participants in 14 sports	300 artists, 2000 tribal journey participants, spirit pole	Team Saskatchewan
8	2011	United States	Milwaukee, Wisconsin	2011 NAIG were cancelled. The Milwaukee host society withdrew their involvement as host for 2011 NAIG in June 2010. They resumed instead with hosting the "inaugural U.S. Indigenous Games"	N/A (Game was cancelled)	
9	2014	Canada	Regina, Saskatchewan	5,000 participants in 15 sports	traditional indigenous activities, cultural village, lance run	Team British Columbia
10	2017	Canada	Toronto, Ontario	June 26, 2015 - The NAIG Council awarded the 2017 NAIG to Toronto, Ontario, Canada. The bid to host the games in Toronto, led by the Aboriginal Sport & Wellness Council of Ontario and the Mississaugas of New Credit First Nation, received unanimous support from the NAIG’s International Governing Body. The games were held on July 16–23, 2017. (Note: Canada was also hosting the 2017 edition of the World Indigenous Games)		Team British Columbia
11	2023	Canada	Halifax, Nova Scotia	The games were originally scheduled to be held in 2020 but had to be rescheduled for July 2023 as a result of the COVID-19 pandemic.		Team Saskatchewan
12	2027	Canada	~~Calgary, Alberta~~	The games were awarded to Calgary in 2023 but the hosting rights were withdrawn in August 2025.		

== Sports ==
Gold, silver, and bronze medals were awarded in sixteen sports:

- Archery
- Badminton
- Basketball
- Baseball
- Boxing
- Canoeing
- Golf
- Lacrosse
- Rifle shooting
- Soccer
- Softball
- Swimming
- Tae Kwon Do
- Track and field and cross-country running
- Volleyball
- Wrestling

== Total medals ==
Team	№ games	1st place, gold medalist(s)	2nd place, silver medalist(s)	3rd place, bronze medalist(s)	Total
Saskatchewan	8	708	713	473	1894
Alberta	8	356	366	385	1056
Manitoba	8	292	303	254	849
British Columbia	8	331	229	211	772
Ontario	8	281	239	204	724
Eastern Door and North	6	175	120	118	410
Yukon	8	90	103	101	294
Northwest Territories	8	54	67	90	209
Washington	8	84	50	45	179
New Mexico	4	59	50	45	154
Wisconsin	6	55	47	48	150
(Haudenosaunee) New York	7	50	49	47	147
North Dakota	5	57	36	21	114
Colorado	6	39	34	28	103
Arizona	5	40	23	22	88
Nova Scotia	4	18	23	41	82
Minnesota	5	30	27	18	75
Oklahoma	3	33	22	17	72
Connecticut	6	33	17	22	72
New Brunswick	6	27	14	26	67
Newfoundland and Labrador	2	15	17	20	52
South Dakota	5	20	16	13	49
Quebec	2	22	12	7	41
Florida	6	8	8	13	29
Maine	3	7	8	12	27
Oregon	4	11	12	3	26
Nunavut	4	10	13	4	26
Michigan	4	9	7	9	25
Iowa	4	9	8	1	18
Idaho	1	9	5	3	17
California	4	6	6	4	16
Montana	4	9	3	1	13
Prince Edward Island	3	3	3	2	8
Utah	2	1	1	2	4
North Carolina	3	2	1	0	3
Mississippi	2	2	0	1	3
Kansas	1	0	2	1	3
(Georgia (U.S. state)) Georgia	1	1	1	0	2
Nebraska	1	0	1	1	2
(Canada) Maritimes	1	0	0	0	1

== See also ==
- Arctic Winter Games
- World Indigenous Games
- Indigenous Peoples' Games
