= Indigenous Peoples' Games =

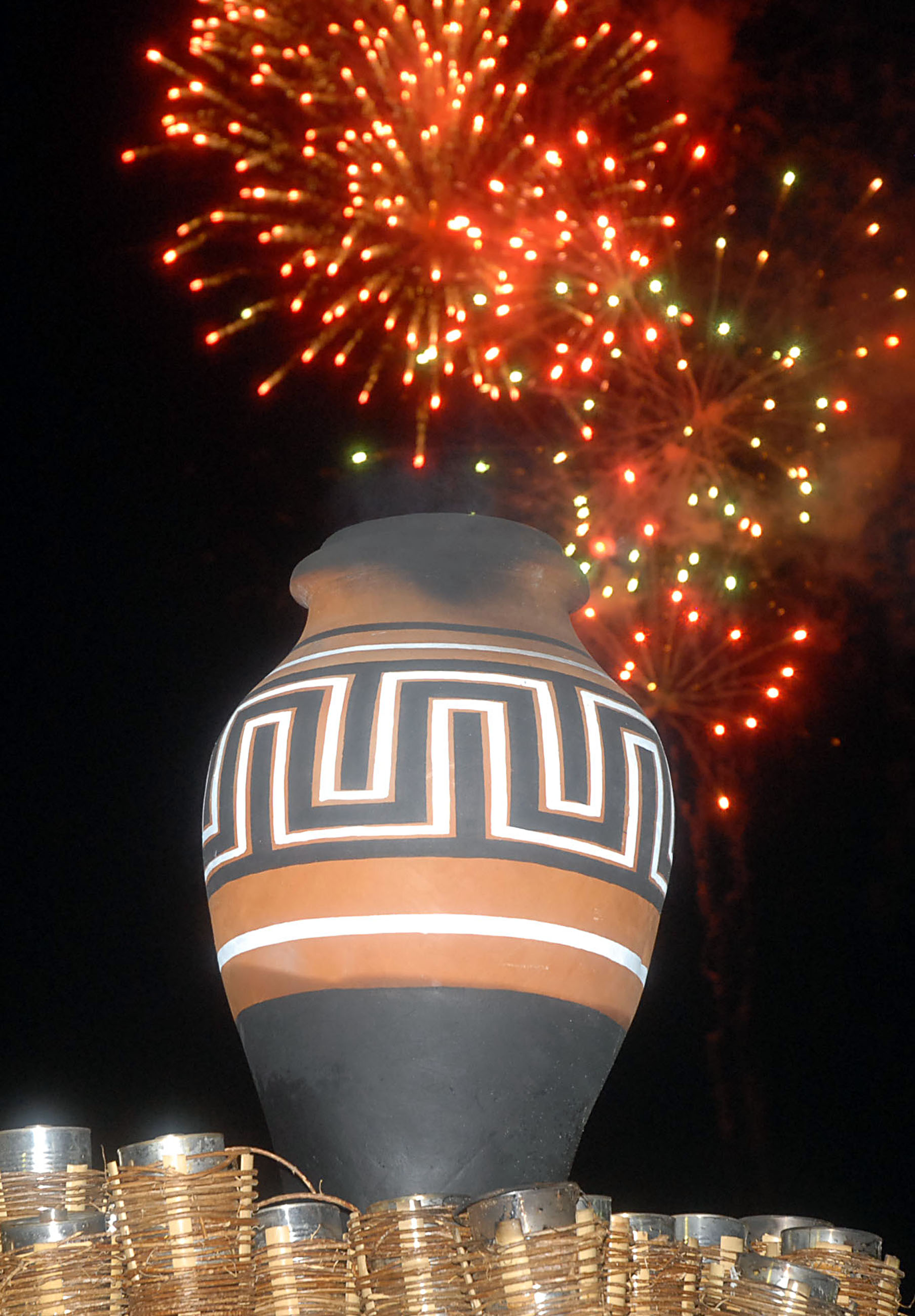
Opening of the 2007 Games

The Indigenous Peoples' Games (Portuguese: Jogos dos Povos Indígenas) are a Brazilian multi-sport event for indigenous peoples, founded in 1996 by the Inter Tribal Council (ITC) with the support of the Brazilian Ministry of Sports. The first event was held in Goiânia, capital of the State of Goias. The chief organiser of the sporting, traditional, cultural and spiritual side of the Games is the indigenous leader, President and founder of the ITC, Marcos Terena. His brother, Carlos Terena, is the Executive organiser of the Games. In total more than 150 Brazilian indigenous groups have participated so far, including the Xavante, Bororo, Pareci and Guarani peoples. Some international delegations from Canada and French Guiana have also taken part in later editions.

This foreign involvement has grown into the World Indigenous Games which was held in 2015.

== Editions ==
Edition	Year	Date	Location	Participating Peoples	Events
I Jogos dos Povos Indígenas	1996	16–20 October	Goiânia, Goias	Bakairi - MT; Bororo- MT; Fulni-ô - PE; Gavião - RO; Guarani - SP e MS; Guató - MS; Kadiwéu - MS; Kaingang - SP, SC e RS; Kamayurá - Xingu - MT; Karajá - TO e GO; Kaiowá - MS; Krahô - TO; Krikati - MA; Saterê-Maués - AM; Ofaié - MS; Paresi - MT; Terena - MS; Tukano - AM; Xucuru - Kariri - AL; Yawalapiti, Xingu - MT; Kuikuro, Xingu - MT; Wuará, Xingu - MT; Xavante - MT, Kalapalo, Xingu - MT; Trumai, Xingu - MT; Mehinaku, Xingu - MT; Kaiapó - PA; Javaé - TO; Kanela - MA.	
II Jogos dos Povos Indígenas	1999	14–20 October	Guaira, Paraná (on the border with Paraguay)	Guarani - SP; Potiguara - PB; Pankararu - PE; Maxacalí - MG; Krenak - MG; Xacriabá - MG; Paresi - MT; Umutina - MT; Kaingang-SC; Kaiowá - MS; Kadiwéu - MS; Bakairi - MT; Bororo - MT; Erikbaktsa - MT; Kanela - MA; Matis - AM; Krahô - TO; Kayapó - PA; Xavante - MT; Karajá - TO; Jawaé - TO; Kuikuro, Xingu - MT; Kamaiurá, Xingu - MT; Yawalapiti, Xingu - MT, Suyá, Xingu - MT; Waurá, Xingu - MT e Terena - MS.	
III Jogos dos Povos Indígenas	2000	15–20 October	Marabá, Pará (in the Brazilian Amazon)	Bororo - MT; Bakairi - MT; Xavante - MT; Xickin - MT; Arara - PA; Munduruku - PA; Krahô - TO; Tembé - PA; Suruí - PA; Kaapor - PA; Parakanã - PA; Matis - AM; Kaiowá - MS; Guarani - SP; Mbyá - PA; Kaingang - PR; Pataxó - BA; Karajá - TO; Asurini - PA; Gavião Parkatejê - PA; Terena - MS; Kanela - MA; Wai Wai - PA; Yawalapiti, Xingu - MT; Kuikuru, Xingu - MT, Kamayura, Xingu - MT; Kalapalo, Xingu - MT; Waurá, Xingu - MT; Mehinaku, Xingú- MT; Erikbatsa - MT; Jawaé - TO; Suyá, Xingu - MS; Arawete - PA; Assurini - PA e Kayapó - PA.	
IV Jogos dos Povos Indígenas	2001	October	Campo Grande, Mato Grosso do Sul, in the Pantanal region		
V Jogos dos Povos Indígenas	2002	14–21 September	Marapanim, Pará		
VI Jogos dos Povos Indígenas	2003	1–8 November	Palmas, Tocantins	Awa Guajá/MA; Aikewara/PA; Apinajé/TO; Avá Canoeiro/GO; Awetí/MT; Bakairi/MT; Bororo/MT; Cinta Larga/RO; Enawêne Nawê/MT; Gavião Kyikatêjê/PA; Guarani/PA; Hixkariana/AM; Javaé/TO; Ka'apor/MA; Kaiwá/MS Kalapalo/MT; Kamayurá/MT; Kanela Ramkokamekra/MA; Karajá/TO; Kayabi/MT; Kayapó/PA; Krahô/TO; Kuikuru/MT; Matis/AM; Nambikwára/RO; Parakanã/PA; Paresi/MT; Pataxó/BA; Rikbatsa/MT; Suruí/RO; Tapirapé-TO/MT; Tembé-PA/; Terena/MS; Uru-Eu-Wau-Wau-/RO; Wai Wai/PA; Waiãpi/AC; Waimri Atroari/AM; Waura/MT: Xavante/MT; Xerente/TO; Xikrin/PA; Xucuru Kariri/AL; Yanomami/RR; Yawalapití/MT.	
VII Jogos dos Povos Indígenas	2004	20–27 November	Porto Seguro, Bahia		
VIII Jogos dos Povos Indígenas	2005	18–26 November	Fortaleza, Ceará		
IX Jogos dos Povos Indígenas	2006	19–26 November	Altamira, Pará		
X Jogos dos Povos Indígenas	2007	24 November- 1 December	Olinda, Pernambuco		
X Jogos dos Povos Indígenas	2009	31 October - 7 November	Paragominas, Pará	Archery, Spear Toss, Tug-of-War, Canoeing, 100m Sprint, Cross-country, Football, Swimming .	
XI Jogos dos Povos Indígenas	2011	8–15 October	Porto Nacional, Tocantins		
XII Jogos dos Povos Indígenas	2013	10–18 October	Cuiabá, Mato Grosso		

== See also ==
- World Indigenous Games
- North American Indigenous Games
