= World Indigenous Games =

Multisport event which involves indigenous athletes

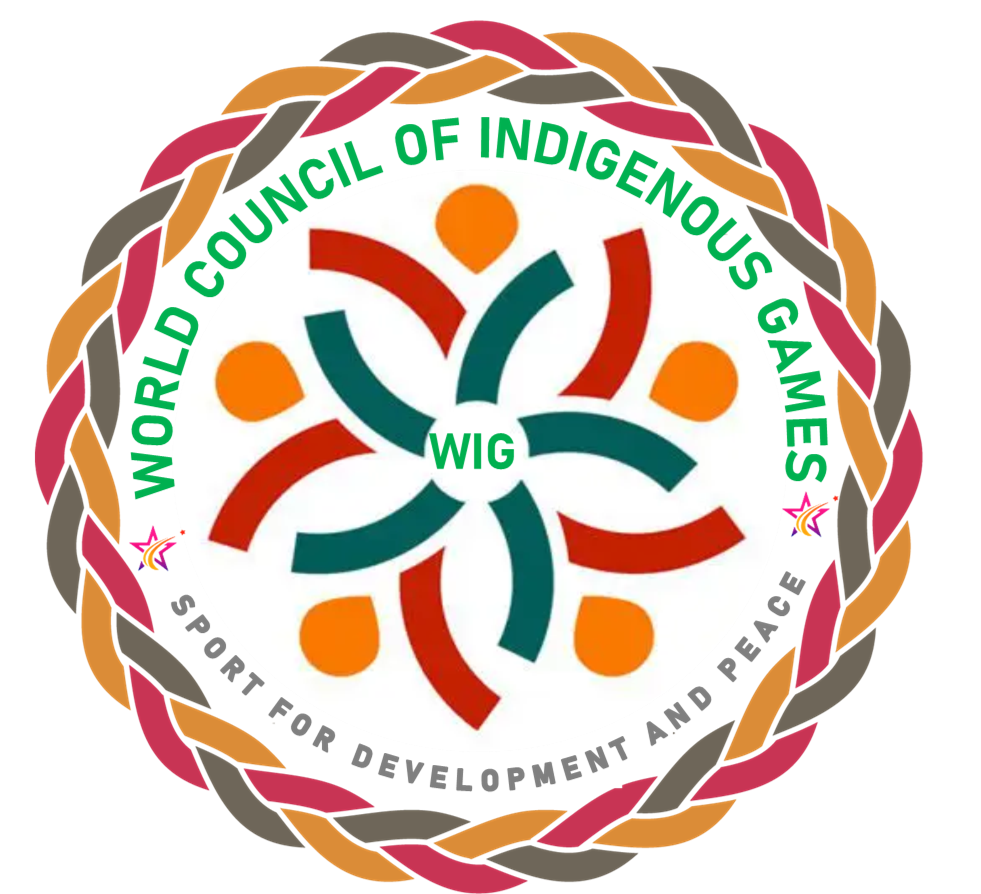
World Indigenous Games logo

The World Indigenous Games was a multisport event involving over 2,000 indigenous athletes competing against one another. These athletes come from all across the world to unite and compete fairly in this event (approximately 30 countries as of 2015).

Throughout the first three days athletes mingle and bond in their area of sport/games before entering the ten-day competition. The Games are governed by the Inter Tribal Council, a Brazilian indigenous peoples NGO that has staged Brazil's national Indigenous Games since 1996. The first edition of the Games was held in Palmas, Brazil, from October 23 to November 1, 2015, while the second (and most recent) was hosted by Alberta, Canada, in 2017. The Games are expected to be held intermittently thereafter, and will feature competitive sports and non-competitive demonstration events. Throughout history, indigenous peoples have had many traditional sports and dances. It is through their history that they have turned these into competitive games and have made it an influential impact on the world and their people's culture. These games consist of body paint replacing sportswear, bare feet instead of sneakers and a looser conception of competition that comes with little value to winning.

The WIN Games are a multisport event structured similar to the Olympics, but with the addition of traditional Indigenous events. The main idea of the games is to focus on reconciliation and the notion that “everyone is welcomed”, exemplified when a group of Syrian refugees were allowed to form a soccer team and compete in the Canada WIN Games. International sporting events have become a means to project positive images and garner social, political, and/or economic benefits for their communities. Organizers and indigenous stakeholders wanted to use the WIN Games to address challenges faced by Indigenous communities such as: stereotypes, lack of resources and opportunities for Indigenous youth, and vulnerability of Indigenous women.

== History ==
The WIN Games were first proposed at a global conference of aboriginal leaders in 1977 by Wilton Littlechild, a 50-time provincial, regional, national and international champion who has been inducted into seven sports halls of fame. Littlechild advocated for the event for about 40 years and met with a lot of resistance (lack of support from government, financial restraints), until the games finally came to life in 2015. More than 2,000 athletes and cultural delegates participated in the first WIN Games, which were considered a cultural success despite the event being chaotic and disorganized.

The World Indigenous Games grew from the Brazilian Indigenous Peoples Games. There have been 12 editions of the national games, during which approximately 1,500 athletes took part. The World Indigenous Games, also known as the Indigenous Olympics, is similar to any other Olympic Games. It started with a variety of sports, traditional opening and closing ceremonies and indigenous participants from all over the world.

Historical Body Paint – Body painting is an ancient tradition that carries deep meaning and value for its people. The art contains a high-spirited significance to the Indigenous people and is thus the reason why they must wear body paint during the games. It is a sign of respect for their land and represents all their people in one. Different designs represent different family relationships, social position, tribe, ancestors and tracts of land. For example, B. Spencer states that in Arnhem Land the people decorate the bodies of young boys for initiation ceremonies. They are painted in tribe/clan totems on the upper body and thighs. Every little detail has a meaning and represents something. This comes down to the design, the colour, the placing of design and who it is put on to.

== Events and competitions ==
The World Indigenous Games consist of many events and competitions. Participants compete in a variety of sporting events. These include Western style competitions such as football and athletics as well as many traditional games: rustic race, spear toss, traditional canoeing, corrida de tora, xikunahati. Events such as archery, swimming, wrestling and tug of war are also a part of these games. Many events are non-competitive. This is to show and demonstrate the respect of heritage. They do this by playing traditional sports and celebrating with dances. Many other non-competitive events showcase the celebration of their culture. They include this in the games by forming social forums, activities for the indigenous women and lectures and fairs for all to join and listen to. It is expected that indigenous people run the Olympics however, important guests could be invited to talk or take part somehow in the games. The main reason for the games is to bring all indigenous people together from around the world. This creates greater diversity and helps express indigenous cultures and traditions.

The second WIN Games (Alberta, Canada) started on July 3, 2017 and ended July 9, 2017. About 1600 athletes from all over the world competed on Indigenous lands, entertaining over 20,000 total spectators (free to attend). Events included: opening and closing ceremonies, traditional and contemporary games, a global business forum, youth conference, education conference, discussion forums on lands, resources and climate change, upholding and implementing Treaty rights, sovereignty and traditional knowledge, and an international Elders gathering. Representatives from 29 countries took part in the opening ceremonies and participated in events including: spear throw, tug of strength, log races, Mexican version of hockey (puck is on fire), Brazil's jikunahati (like soccer except players whack a small ball only with their heads), canoeing, Indian horse relays, lacrosse, Denesuline hand games, bow and arrow, swimming and soccer. No information regarding awards/prizes was found.

=== Traditional games ===
==== Wild tree-trunk ====
This game is a crowd favourite, and is similar to a relay. Nine or more participants are expected to sprint 500 metres each around a red dirt arena. Whilst running they carry a 100 kg chunk of tree on their shoulders.

==== Archery ====
Participants' bodies are covered with traditional paintings and have to be bare chested. They then line up on a palm of leaves with their bows, 40 metres away from their target. Their target is small fish leaping in and out of the water. Those who spear the most fish gain the points. The highest possible score to achieve is done by drilling the arrow right into the eye.

==== Xikunahati ====
This particular event resembles football. However no body part but the head is allowed to touch the ball. The sport was created by the indigenous Paresi-Haliti people of Brazil.

Overall these Olympics are not about competition but are about celebration.

== List of World Indigenous Games ==
Games	Year	Host	Dates	Ref				
Games	Year	Host	Dates	Ref	1	2015	Palmas, Tocantins, Brazil	October 23 - November 1
2	2017	Treaty 6 Territory, Alberta, Canada	July 1–9					

== Media Coverage ==
As mentioned earlier, the WIN Games were based on the Olympic model, but organizers wanted to make sure the cultural component of Indigenous traditions was included. Dozens of Indigenous languages were used (along with traditional languages like English). Additionally, the focus was on traditional sports and games rather than on mainstream sports in order to not lose the traditional essence. Canadian mainstream media provided extensive coverage for Indigenous stakeholders during the 2017 WIN Games to give attention to the issues faced by Indigenous groups. The authors argue that these challenges faced were linked to the lasting effect of government's formal assimilation policies on Indigenous communities, the lack of culturally relevant education in school settings, and the urban environment within which many Indigenous youths are growing up. Of 147 articles collected, all of them had some content related to Indigenous peoples involved in the events and 122 featured direct quotations from Indigenous peoples or featured substantive coverage as part of the news stories.

== Participating countries ==
Over 30 countries participate in the Indigenous Games. Within that 30 more than 2000 athletes participate. Some countries that perform in these games are listed below.

- Argentina
- Australia
- Brazil
- Canada
- Chile
- Colombia
- (Republic of the Congo) Congo
- Ecuador
- Ethiopia
- French Guiana
- Guatemala
- Mexico
- Mongolia
- New Zealand
- Nicaragua
- Panama
- Paraguay
- Peru
- Philippines (Aeta, Dumagat, Ifugao peoples)
- Russia
- United States of America
- Uruguay
- Venezuela

== Facts ==
The WIN games in Brazil, hosted in Palmas, capital of the state of Tocantins, were developed on a partnership led by the Municipality of Palmas, under the administration of mayor Carlos Franco Amastha, the Intertribal Committee, ran by chiefs Carlos and Marcos Terena and the Ministry of Sports of Brazil. Over 300 international media and press companies covered the event, 3000 athletes competed, and the 10 days programme was followed by an audience of 10.000 people on a daily basis. The opening ceremony was attended by former president of Brazil Dilma Rousseff and several indigenous leaders and diplomatic representatives of the 30 participant countries. The WIN Games in Canada, the second edition, had the "Friendship Spear", symbol of the Games, passed by Mayor Carlos Amastha, host of the 1st World Games in history to chief Willie Littlechild, Canadian representative.

== Formation of the World Council of Indigenous Games (WIG) ==
The World Council of Indigenous Games (WIG) was formed as an international non-profit organization to unite Indigenous communities and promote their traditional sports and cultural heritage on a global platform. Established in India, WIG was created with the vision of providing a structured, representative, and inclusive body to support Indigenous games, protect cultural traditions, and encourage participation from member nations worldwide. Today, WIG includes members from 100+ countries, working collectively to preserve Indigenous identity through sport and culture.

WIG was introduced with the approval and blessings of Chief Willie Littlechild (J. Wilton Littlechild), a respected global Indigenous leader and a driving force behind the World Indigenous Games. In honour of his lifelong contributions, WIG has also instituted the International Wilton Award, recognizing outstanding achievements and service toward the promotion of Indigenous sports and cultural preservation.

== List of World Council of Indigenous Games (WIG) - Activities ==
Sl. No.	Activity Name	MM-YYYY	Place	Brief Description	UN Relevance
1	Indigenous Games & Environmental Awareness Program	June 2024	Coimbatore, Tamil Nadu, India	Community program promoting Indigenous outdoor games emphasizing harmony with nature, minimal resource use, and ecological values.	Public awareness, sustainable lifestyles
2	Indigenous Knowledge Documentation Initiative	July 2024	Tamil Nadu, India	Documentation of Indigenous games and cultural practices linked to land, seasons, and ecosystems.	Indigenous knowledge, adaptation
3	Youth Engagement through Indigenous Games for Sustainability	August 2024	Coimbatore, India	Youth-focused activities connecting Indigenous games with environmental responsibility and climate awareness.	Capacity building, education
4	Indigenous Games, Health & Environment Linkage Program	September 2024	Tamil Nadu, India	Promotion of low-carbon, nature-based physical activities and their benefits for health and environment.	Co-benefits of climate action
5	Annual General Assembly with Sustainability Agenda	December 2024	Tamil Nadu, India	Organizational meeting including discussions on sustainability, environmental responsibility, and climate-aligned planning.	Institutional capacity
6	Indigenous Community Outreach on Nature-Based Practices	January 2025	Rural Tamil Nadu, India	Community engagement on traditional games conducted in natural environments and ecosystem respect.	Nature-based solutions
7	International Dialogue on Indigenous Knowledge & Sustainability	February 2025	Online (International)	Virtual dialogue with international members on Indigenous knowledge, sustainability, and environmental challenges.	International cooperation
8	Indigenous Games for Climate-Conscious Lifestyles Campaign	March 2025	Coimbatore, India	Awareness campaign promoting Indigenous games as low-emission, community-driven alternatives to resource-intensive sports.	Mitigation awareness

== See also ==
- Indigenous Peoples' Games
- North American Indigenous Games
- Traditional games
- World Council of Indigenous Games (WIG).
