= Ethnosport Cultural Festival =

Annual sport and culture festival in Anatolia and Central Asia

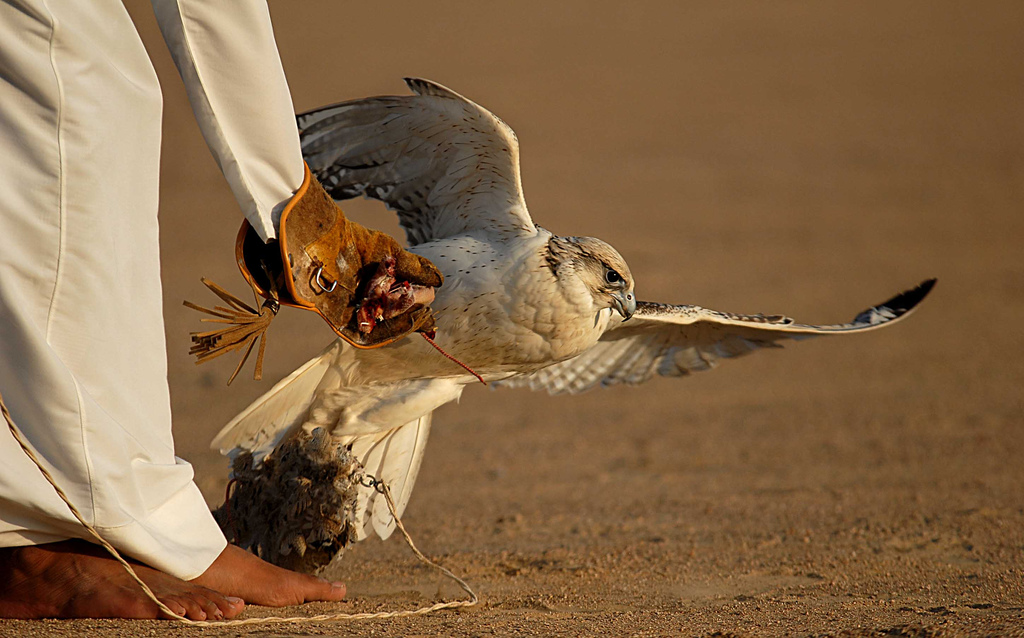
- Falconry
- Abbreviation: Ethnosport
- Motto: 2018:The horse belongs to those who ride it and the sword to those who gird it on
- Purpose: Sport, cultural revival
- Frequency: Annually
- Inaugurated: 2016; 10 years ago
- Most recent: May 2018
- World Ethnosports Federation President: Bilal Erdogan
- Headquarters: Istanbul, Turkey
- Website: etnosporfestivali.com

The Ethnosport Cultural Festival is a five-day sport and culture festival held annually in Istanbul, Turkey.

Sporting and cultural activities of the West Asian Anatolia peninsula, Central Asia and the greater Turkic world – but also Japanese, Middle Eastern and other – are held.

For the festival, Yenikapi Square (in Istanbul's Yenikapi quarter) is transformed into a traditional-looking Turkic–Central Asian village with traditional tents, traditional sports fields and horse areas. In the 2018 edition, there were 150 horses involved.

Thirteen of the tents are set up by different Turkic countries and communities with a fourteenth tent for Qatar in the 2018 edition.

Traditional crafts and dance are among the workshops given in the tents around the festival grounds. Over 880 athletes participated in the thirteen ethnosports in the latest (third) edition.

== Sports ==
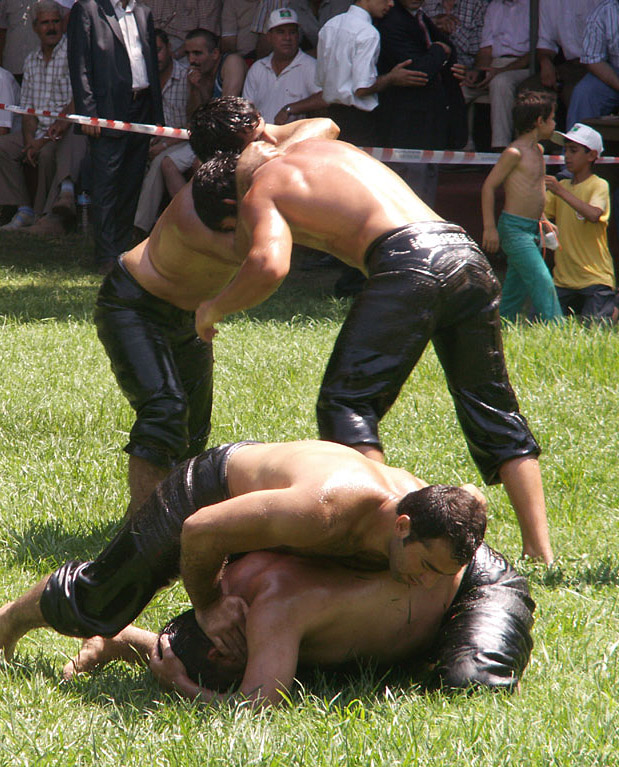
Oil wrestling

As of the third edition, there were thirteen different ethnosports in which athletes compete. These included aba wrestling, shalwar wrestling, brace wrestling, oil wrestling and mounted archery.

In the third edition, Yabusame (traditional Japanese horseback archery) and falcon racing were also featured.

=== Oil wrestling ===
Oil wrestling is a sport in which two opponents covered in olive oil wrestle each other. Due to the olive oil, gripping the opponent is made much more difficult and thus adds a level of complexity to the sport as compared to the non-oiled Greco-Roman wrestling. It is said that it was practiced by the ancients 4,500 years ago, but it has at least been practiced since the Ottoman conquest of Rumelia.

Originally, the wrestling would continue until one of the wrestlers is overpowered. However, later on a point system was added. At the first oil wrestling tournament, which lasted for three days, it is said that in the final round two brothers wrestled each other and neither one was able to outplay the other and they ended up dying of exhaustion. The Kırkpınar tournament continues today in their spirit.

The wrestling takes place on a grassy patch of earth which is designated as the (Turkish:Er Meydanı).

It is considered an inseparable part of Turkish culture.

=== Shalwar wrestling ===
The opponents in this sport wrestle each other barefoot and wearing shalwars.

=== Brace wrestling ===
(Turkish:KUŞAK GÜREŞİ) or (Crimean:küreş)

=== Mounted jarid ===
This is a sport where jarids (a type of spear) are used on horseback.

=== Mounted archery ===
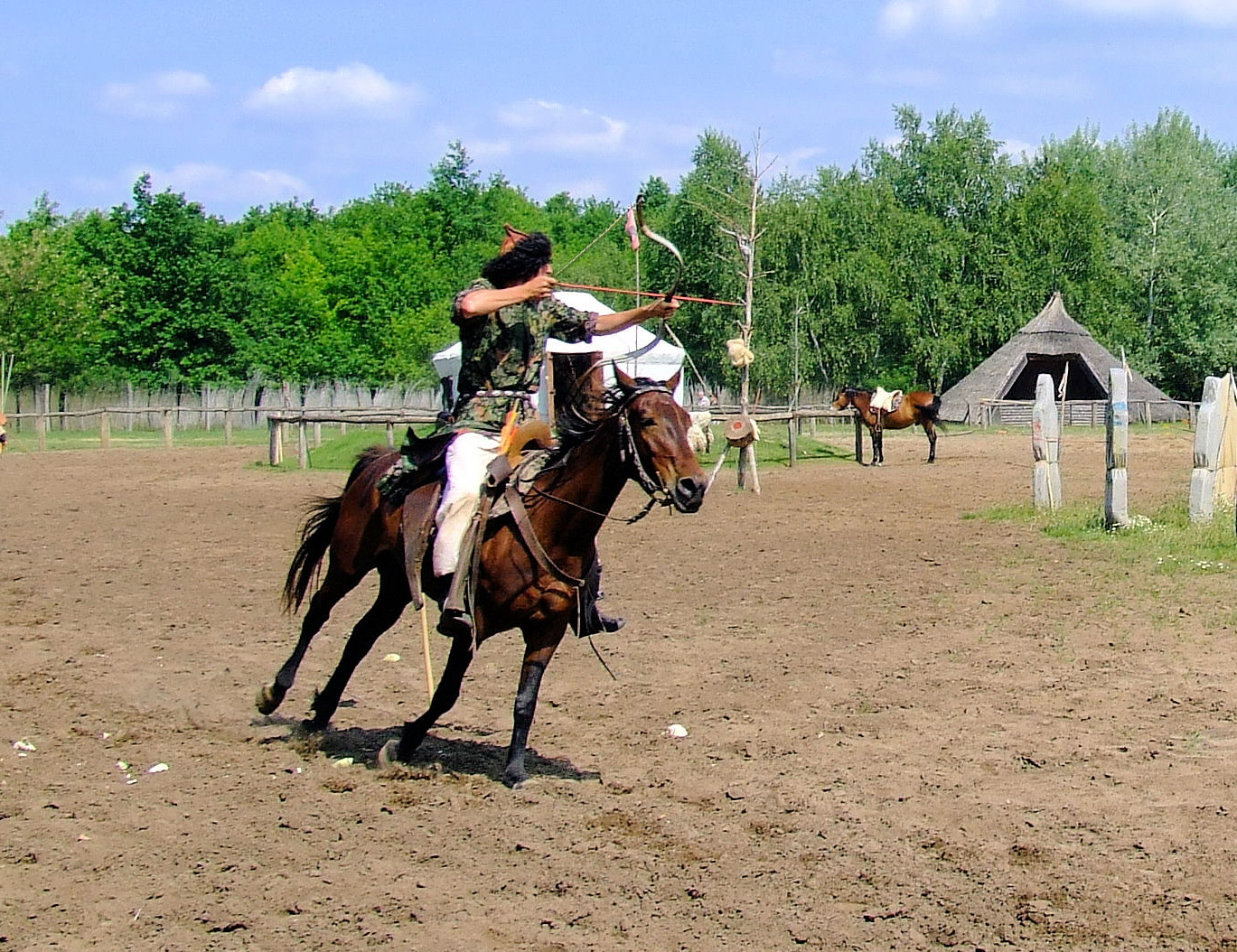
Horse archery

This is archery on horseback.

=== Talus bone games ===
The game consists of players placing their goat or cow anklebones in the center of a circle and then knocking them out. There are three different variants that can be played to the game.

=== Kökbörü ===
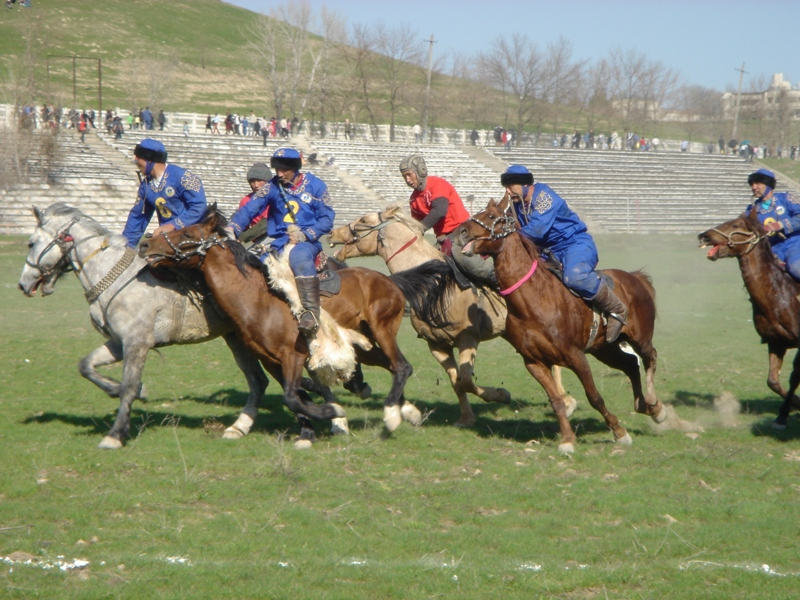
Kökbörü

(Kazakh:kokpar) kökbörü

=== Aba wrestling ===
In this type of wrestling, the wrestlers wear abes on their backs.

=== Mas wrestling ===
Mas wrestling a.k.a. Ağaç Güreşi, literally "tree wrestling" or Çubuk Çekme, literally "rod pulling" is a Yakut national sport that is done on a flat, non-slippery, platform. In the middle of the platform, there is a plank which is strongly fixed platform on its side. The two opponents sit on either sides of the plank with their feet on the plank and they put their arms forward and hold a rod together. Then using virtually all the muscles in the body, they pull on the rod.

=== Mangala ===
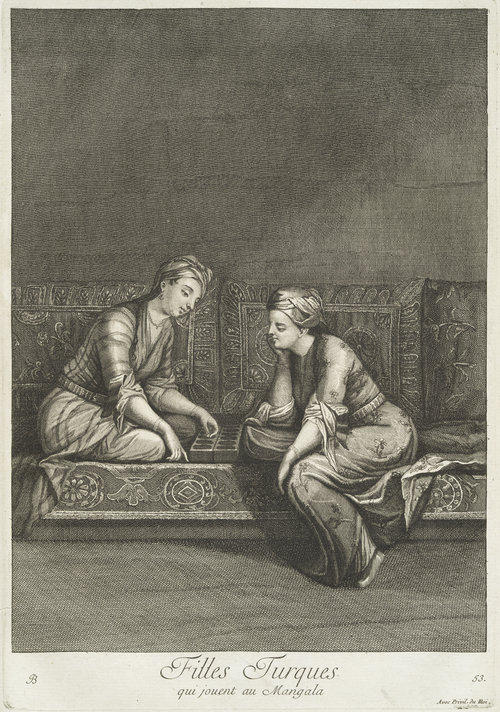
Turkish girls playing mangala, 1700s

=== Yabusame ===
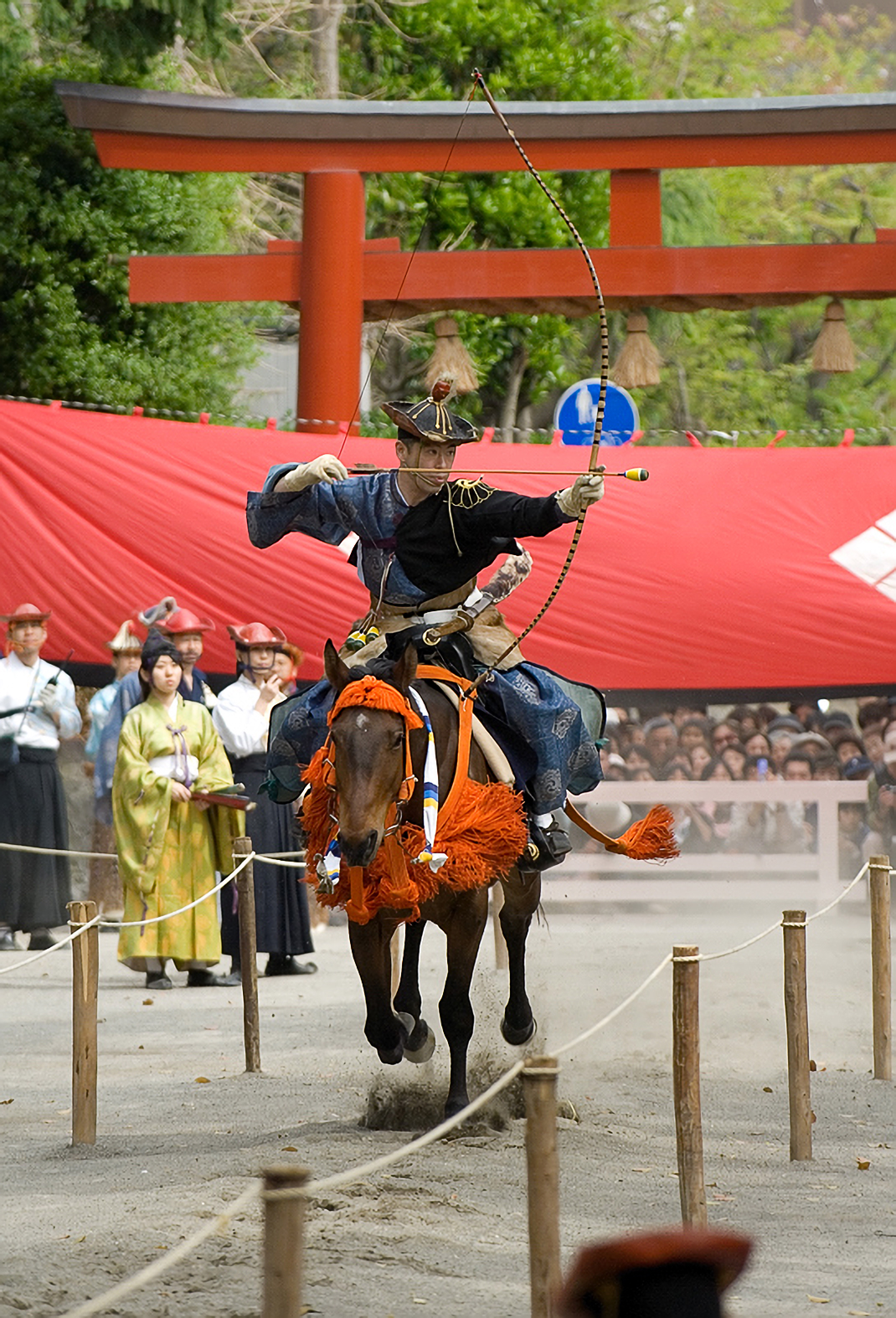
Yabusame archer on horseback

== Organisation ==
The event is organised by the World Ethnosports Federation and sponsored by Anadolu Agency.

There were forty recognized sports in 2025.

== Venue ==
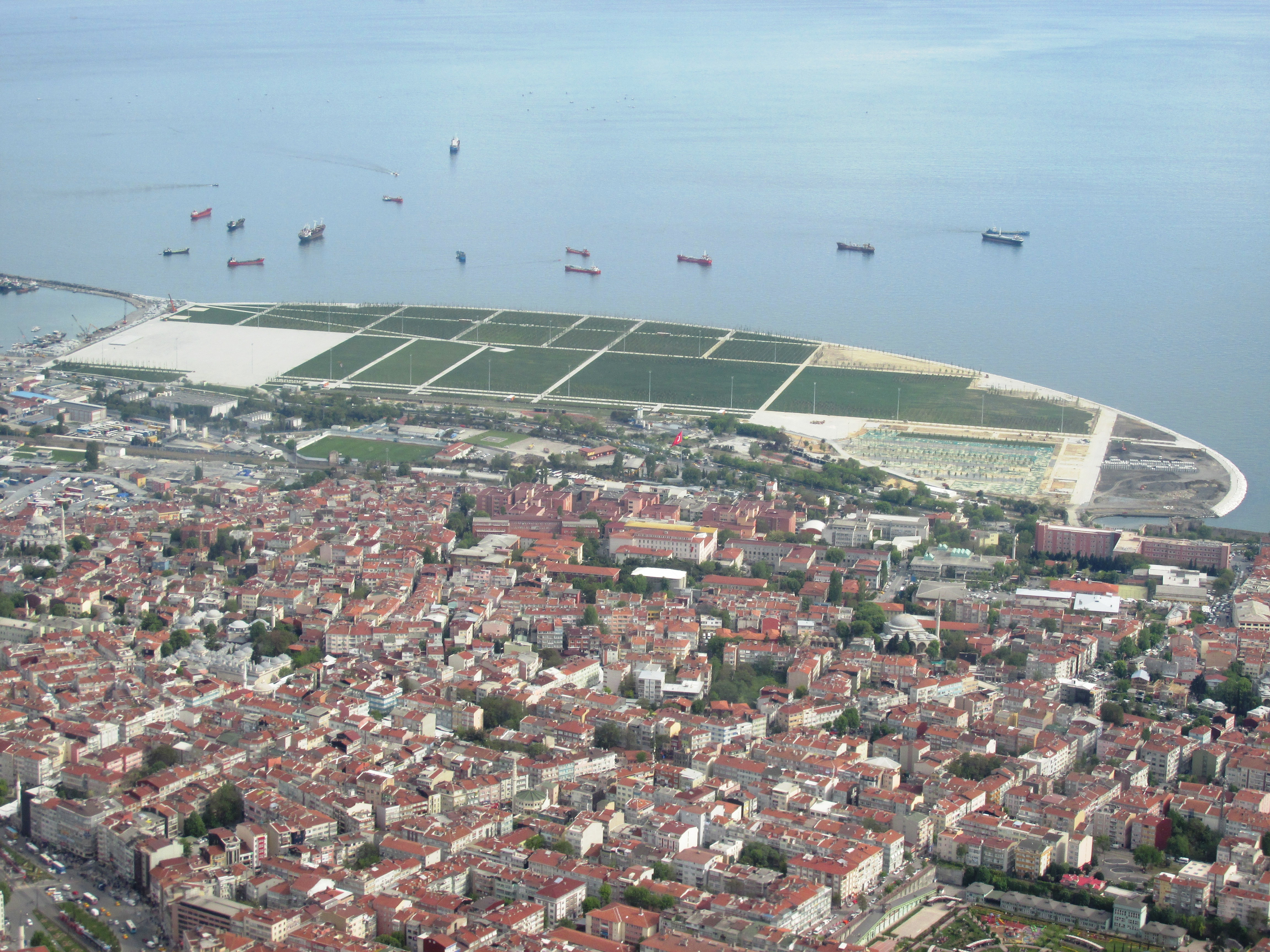
Yenikapı Square, a visible bulge form along the natural borders of the Sea of Marmara

The 2018 event was held at Yenikapi, Istanbul.

== Slogan ==
Every year the festival has a new slogan. In 2018, it was: The horse belongs to those who ride it and the sword to those who gird it on.

== See also ==
- World Nomad Games
- Ethnosport
