= Chelsea Jarvis =

Canadian curler

- Curler
- Born: March 11, 1992 (age 34); Whitehorse, Yukon

Team
- Curling club: Whitehorse CC, Whitehorse, YT
- Skip: Patty Wallingham
- Third: Kelsey Meger
- Second: Shelby Jensen
- Lead: Chelsea Jarvis
- Alternate: Emily Matthews

Curling career
- Member Association: Yukon
- Hearts: 6 (2014, 2015, 2017, 2018, 2020, 2023)
Medal record
Representing Yukon
Arctic Winter Games
Gold medal – first place	2010 Grande Prairie
Silver medal – second place	2008 Yellowknife

Chelsea Lin Jarvis (née Duncan; born March 11, 1992) is a Canadian curler from Whitehorse, Yukon. She currently plays lead on Team Patty Wallingham. She was the longtime third for Sarah Koltun in her junior career.

== Career ==
=== Juniors ===
At just 13 years old, Jarvis' first national championship was at the 2007 Canadian Junior Curling Championships where she played third for Sarah Koltun. Her team finished last with a 1–11 record. Later that year, the team finished 1–5 at the 2007 Canada Winter Games. She also played third for Koltun at the next six Canadian Junior Curling Championships. Their best result was in 2013, where they went 7–4 before losing in a tiebreaker. Other notable results were a 6–6 record in 2011 and a 5–7 finish in 2009. She competed at two Arctic Winter Games in 2008 and 2010 winning a gold medal in 2010 and a silver medal in 2008. Jarvis also competed for the University of Alberta at the U Sports/Curling Canada University Curling Championships in 2011 and 2012 as the alternate for the team. They finished 4–3 in 2011 and 4–4 in 2012.

=== Women's ===
Jarvis got to represent Yukon/Northwest Territories at the 2014 Scotties Tournament of Hearts as they had previously won the 2014 NWT/Yukon Scotties Tournament of Hearts. They were the first team from Yukon to win the event since 2000. At the Hearts in Montreal, Quebec, they finished last, however they were able to defeat Prince Edward Island's Kim Dolan and Saskatchewan's Stefanie Lawton. The following year, Yukon and Northwest Territories had separate entries to the national championship however due to a format change and because they placed last the previous year, they were put into a pre-qualifying tournament against Northern Ontario and Northwest Territories to determine the final spot in the main draw. They would lose both of their games and were eliminated. They would not participate in the 2016 Yukon Scotties Tournament of Hearts but returned in 2017 where they won the event by default. At the 2017 Scotties Tournament of Hearts, they managed to win their game against Nunavut however lost to both the Territories and New Brunswick and were once again eliminated. After the season, Koltun moved to the Northwest Territories to join the Kerry Galusha rink and the team disbanded.

Chelsea and her sister Jenna Duncan formed a new rink for the 2017–18 season with Kara Price, Jody Smallwood and Loralee Johnstone. The team represented Yukon at the 2018 Scotties Tournament of Hearts, where they finished 1–7. Jarvis made her fifth Hearts appearance in 2020 where she played third for Hailey Birnie. At the 2020 Scotties Tournament of Hearts, the team finished tied for last with an 0–7 record.

After taking a few seasons off, Jarvis rejoined the Birnie rink at third for the 2022–23 season. The team also included second Kerry Campbell and lead Kimberley Tuor. They played in one tour event during the season, the King Cash Spiel in Maple Ridge, British Columbia. Through the round robin, the team finished with a 3–1 record, qualifying for the playoffs. They then lost to British Columbia's Shawna Jensen in the semifinal. At the 2023 Scotties Tournament of Hearts, the team led the Yukon to a 1–7 round robin record. In their sole win, they upset Wild Card #2's Casey Scheidegger 10–3.

=== Mixed doubles ===
Jarvis competed in the 2013 Canadian Mixed Doubles Curling Trials with her partner Mitch Young. The duo qualified for the playoffs with a 6–1 record, before losing in the round of 12.

== Personal life ==
Jarvis currently works as a family preservation caseworker for the Council of Yukon First Nations. She is married and has one daughter. She studied psychology at the University of Alberta. Her sister Jenna Duncan is also a curler.

== Teams ==
Season	Skip	Third	Second	Lead	Alternate
2006–07	Chelsea Duncan (Fourth)	Sarah Koltun (Skip)	Tessa Vibe	Linea Eby	
2007–08	Chelsea Duncan (Fourth)	Sarah Koltun (Skip)	Linea Eby	Tessa Vibe	
2008–09	Sarah Koltun	Chelsea Duncan	Linea Eby	Jenna Duncan	
2009–10	Sarah Koltun	Chelsea Duncan	Linea Eby	Jenna Duncan	
2010–11	Sarah Koltun	Chelsea Duncan	Linea Eby	Jenna Duncan	
2011–12	Sarah Koltun	Chelsea Duncan	Linea Eby	Jenna Duncan	
2012–13	Sarah Koltun	Chelsea Duncan	Patty Wallingham	Jenna Duncan	
2013–14	Sarah Koltun	Chelsea Duncan	Patty Wallingham	Andrea Sinclair	Jenna Duncan
2014–15	Sarah Koltun	Chelsea Duncan	Patty Wallingham	Andrea Sinclair	Lindsay Moldowan
2016–17	Sarah Koltun	Chelsea Duncan	Patty Wallingham	Jenna Duncan	Helen Strong (STOH)
2017–18	Chelsea Duncan	Jenna Duncan	Kara Price	Jody Smallwood	Loralee Johnstone
2019–20	Hailey Birnie	Chelsea Duncan	Gabrielle Plonka	Kimberly Tuor	Rhonda Horte
2022–23	Hailey Birnie	Chelsea Jarvis	Kerry Campbell	Kimberley Tuor	Jenna Duncan
2024–25	Patty Wallingham	Kelsey Meger	Shelby Jensen	Chelsea Jarvis	Emily Matthews
