= 2012 Arctic Winter Games =

Multi-sports competition

2012 Arctic Winter Games Whitehorse
- The 2012 Whitehorse logo
- Host city: Whitehorse, Yukon
- Country: Canada
- Nations: 7 countries: Canada; Denmark; Finland; Norway; Russia; Sweden; United States
- Teams: 9 contingents: Alaska; Greenland; Northern Alberta; Northwest Territories; (Quebec) Nunavik Québec; Nunavut; Sápmi; Yamal-Nenets; Yukon
- Athletes: 1,472
- Events: 264
- Opening: March 4, 2012
- Closing: March 10, 2012

The 2012 Arctic Winter Games was a winter multi-sport event which took place in Whitehorse, Yukon, Canada, between 4 and 10 March 2012.

The Arctic Winter Games is the world's largest multisport and cultural event for young people of the Arctic. The Games is an international biennial celebration of circumpolar sports and culture held for a week, each time with a different nation or region as the host. AWG celebrates sports, social interaction and culture. The Games contributes to creating an awareness on cultural diversity, and develops athletes to participate in the competitions with the focus on fair play. The Games binds the Arctic countries together and includes traditional games such as Arctic sports and Dené games.

Around 1,500 athletes from nine teams participated in the games.

== Organization ==
The 2012 Arctic Winter Games were set in Whitehorse, Yukon. This marked this the sixth times the games were hosted by Whitehorse. The general manager of the games were Chris Milner, an athlete in the 1990 Arctic Winter Games.

=== Marketing ===
2012's mascot was a Husky dog named 'Borealis'. The dog sports a Whitehorse Arctic Winter Games 2012 shirt and, as is common in Huskies, has different coloured eyes (known as heterochromia).

=== Participants ===
Nine contingents participated in the 2012 Arctic Winter Games. The number of athletes sent by each contingent is shown in parentheses in the list below.

- Alaska, United States (281)
- Greenland (91)
- Northern Alberta, Canada (179)
- Northwest Territories, Canada (276)
- Nunavik, Quebec, Canada (53)
- Nunavut, Canada (227)
- Sámi people (33)
- Yamalo-Nenets, Russia (62)
- Yukon, Canada (270) (host)

== Venues ==
The 2012 games were held at various sports venues, schools and facilities in Whitehorse.

=== Sports venues ===
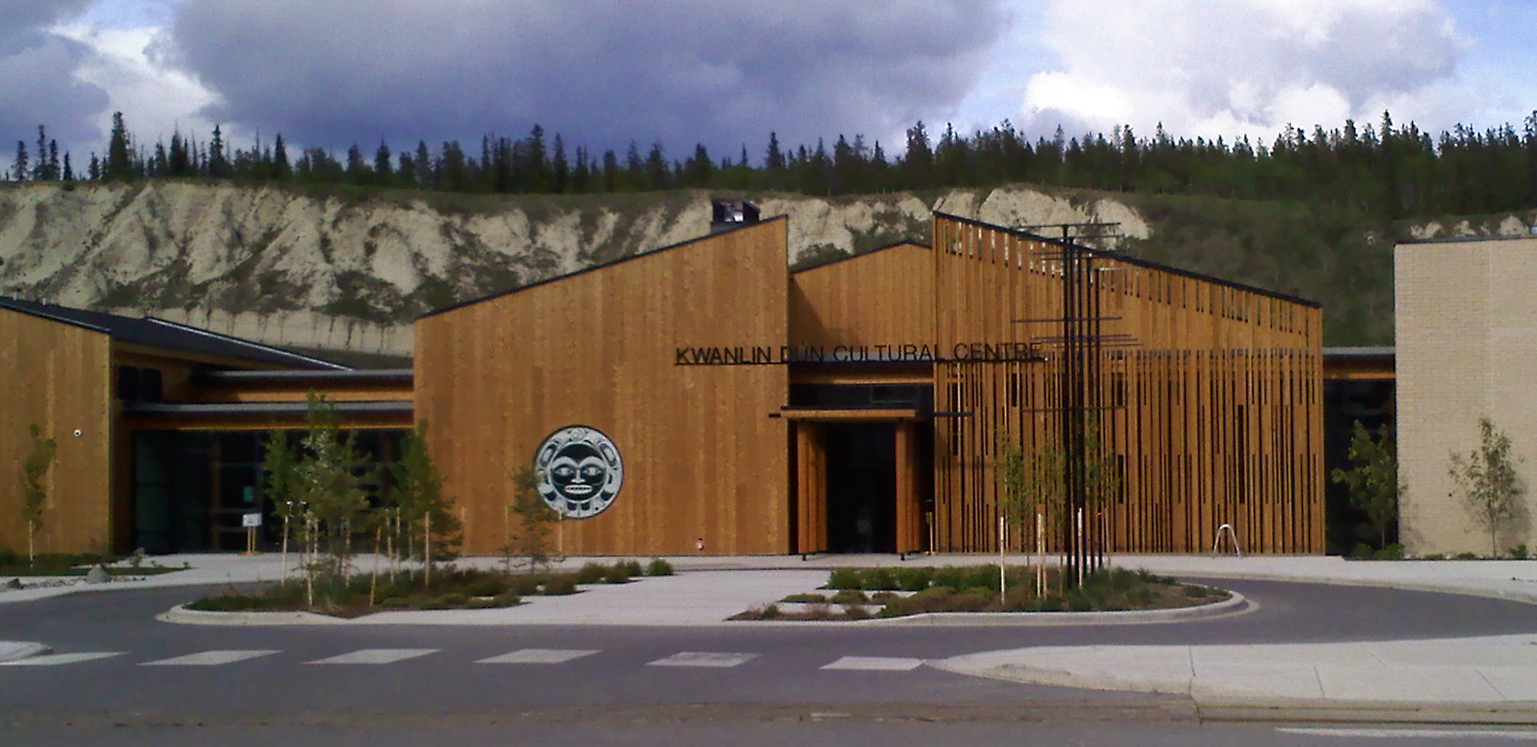
Kwanlin Dün Cultural Centre

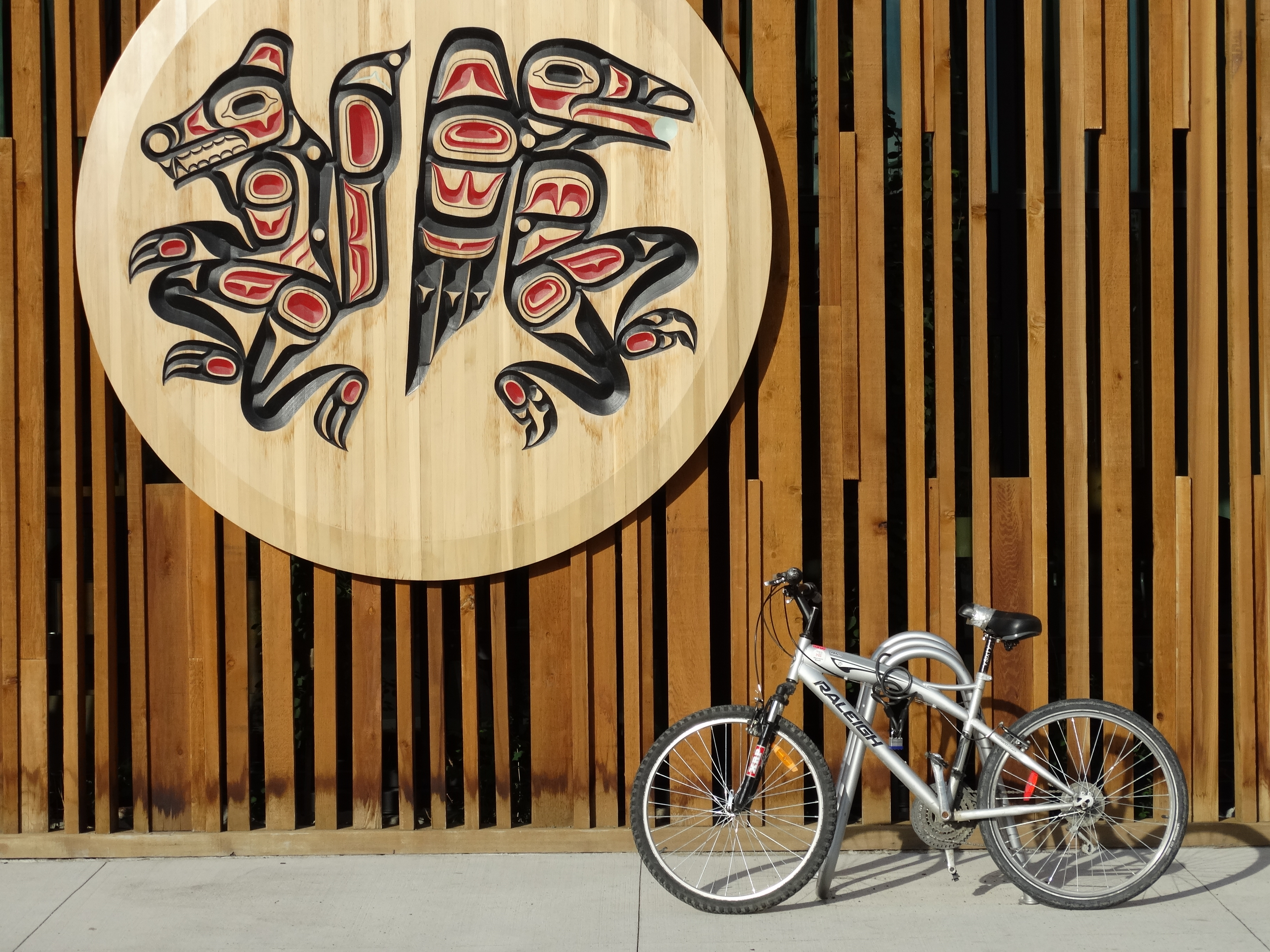
Indigenous art outside the Kwanlin Dün Cultural Centre

The following venues hosted sports events during the games. All locations were located within Whitehorse.

Venue	Events
CGC-ATCO Ice	Figure skating, ice hockey, short track speed skating
CGC-Fieldhouse	Indoor soccer
CGC-Flexihall	Volleyball
Curling Club	Curling
F.H. Collins Secondary School	Basketball
Grey Mountain	Biathlon, snowshoe biathlon
Kwanlin Dün Cultural Centre	Dene games, various cultural events, workshops
Mount Lorne	Dog mushing
Mount McIntyre	Cross country skiing
Mount Sima	Alpine skiing, snowboarding
Porter Creek Secondary School	Badminton
Selkirk School	Table tennis
Shipyards Park	Snowshoeing
Takhini Arena	Ice hockey
Vanier Secondary School	Arctic sports, gymnastics
Yukon College	Wrestling

=== Cultural venues ===
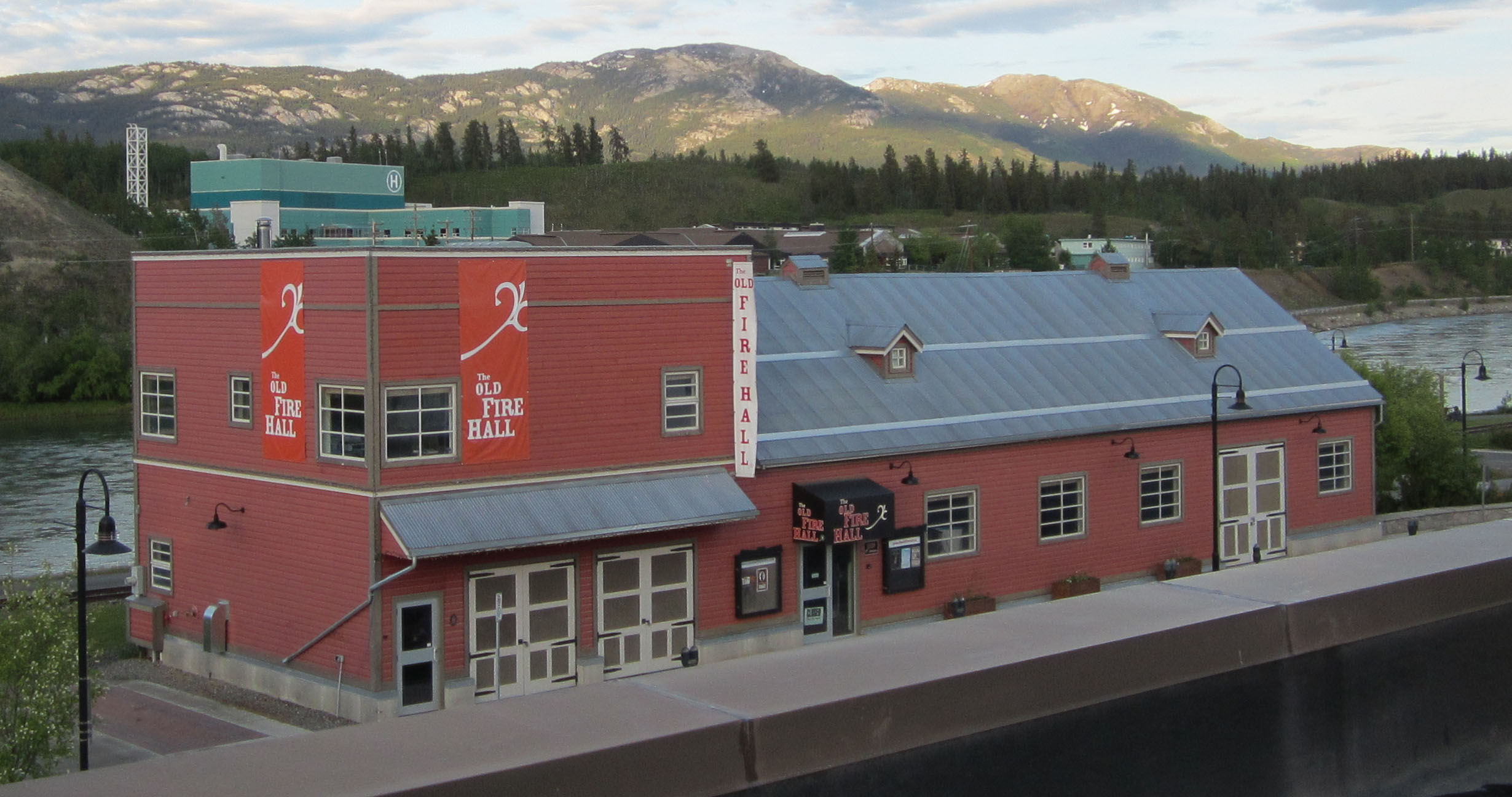
The Old Fire Hall, part of the Yukon Arts Centre

The following venues hosted cultural events during the games. All locations were located within Whitehorse.

Venue	Events
Arts Underground	Various events, workshops
Baked Café	Various events
Canada Games Centre	Opening ceremony, closing ceremony
Centre de la francophonie	Various events
CGC & ATCO Stage	Various events
First Ave & Main St, CGC	Workshops
Yukon Arts Centre	Various events, workshops

== Medal tally ==
Rank	Team	Gold	Silver	Bronze	Total
1	Alaska	61	67	62	190
2	Yamal	50	34	17	101
3	Yukon	46	47	29	122
4	Alberta North	40	37	27	104
5	Northwest Territories	32	30	54	116
6	Greenland	18	15	17	50
7	(Quebec) Nunavik Québec	10	14	12	36
8	Nunavut	5	16	29	50
9	Sápmi	4	4	5	13
Totals (9 entries)		266	264	252	782

== The Games ==
=== Sports ===
264 events in 20 sport disciplines were scheduled in the 2012 Arctic Winter Games program. Freestyle skiing was removed from the program, after its debut appearance at the 2010 Arctic Winter Games. 4 skiing sports were held, with alpine skiing, biathlon, cross-country skiing and snowboarding. 2 snowshoe events were held, with snowshoe biathlon and snowshoeing. 2 racquet sports were held, with badminton and table tennis. 2 skating events were held, those being figure skating and short track speed skating. Team sports held were basketball, indoor soccer, ice hockey, volleyball and curling. Traditional Inuit sports were also held, with Arctic sports, Dene games, dog mushing and wrestling, the latter also including events for traditional wrestling. Also held was gymnastics.

- Alpine skiing (13)
- Arctic sports (35)
- Badminton (10)
- Basketball (2)
- Biathlon (14)
- Cross-country skiing (24)
- Curling (2)
- Dene games (24)
- Dog mushing (6)
- Figure skating (13)
- Gymnastics (6)
- Ice hockey (3)
- Indoor soccer (5)
- Short track speed skating (20)
- Snowboarding (20)
- Snowshoe biathlon (14)
- Snowshoeing (14)
- Table tennis (12)
- Volleyball (2)
- Wrestling (25)

=== Calendar ===
OC	Opening ceremony	●	Cultural events	●	Event competitions	1	Event finals	CC	Closing ceremony

March	3 Sun	4 Mon	5 Tue	6 Wed	7 Thu	8 Fri	9 Sat	10 Sun	Total
Ceremonies		OC						CC	
Cultural events	●	●	●	●	●	●	●	●	
Alpine skiing			4	4	5				13
Arctic sports			5	8	8	5	9		35
Badminton			●	●	●	●	●	10	10
Basketball			●	●	●	●	●	2	2
Biathlon			4	4		4	2		14
Cross country skiing			6	6		6	6		24
Curling			●	●	●	●	2		2
Dene games			4	4	2	6	8		24
Dog mushing				2	2		2		6
Figure skating				4	8		1		13
Gymnastics				1		5			6
Ice hockey		●	●	●	●	●	1	2	3
Indoor soccer		●	●	●	●	●	●	5	5
Short track speed skating			4	4		4	8		20
Snowboarding			4	4	4	8			20
Snowshoe biathlon			4	4		4	2		14
Snowshoeing			4		4		6		14
Table tennis			●	4	4	●	4		12
Volleyball			●	●	●	●	2		2
Wrestling			1		12	12			25
Total events	0	0	40	49	49	54	53	19	264
March	3 Sun	4 Mon	5 Tue	6 Wed	7 Thu	8 Fri	9 Sat	10 Sun	Total

== Culture ==
The 2012 Arctic Winter Games were the first to have a relay. Rather than passing a baton or torch, however, a song was relayed. The youth at the games passed on a song, was in effort to promoting heritage awareness and cultural diversity.

== Hodgson Trophy ==
The Hodgson trophy for fair play and team spirit is awarded at the end of every games. The trophy has been awarded since 1978 and named for Stuart Milton Hodgson, Commissioners of the Northwest Territories from 1967 to 1979. The 2012 Hodgson Trophy was awarded to Team Nunavut.

Preceded by Grande Prairie 2010	Arctic Winter Games; Whitehorse; 2012 Arctic Winter Games	Succeeded by Fairbanks 2014
