= Skiland =

Ski area in Alaska, United States

Ski Land

- Location in Alaska
- Location: Fairbanks, Alaska
- Mountain: Cleary Summit
- Coordinates: 65°02′56″N 147°24′33″W
- Vertical: 1,027 ft (310 m) lift served
- Top elevation: 2,435 ft (740 m)
- Base elevation: 1,408 ft (430 m)
- Skiable area: 530 acres (2.1 km^{2})
- Trails: 46: 20% easiest; 50% more difficult; 30% most difficult
- Lift system: 2 total: 1 double chair (fixed-grip); 1 magic carpet
- Website: Ski Land Website

Ski Land is a lift-served ski and snowboard area at Cleary Summit on the Steese Highway, 20 miles north of Fairbanks, Alaska. The area has one chairlift, North America's most-northern; it is 3882 feet long and serves 1027 feet of vertical rise. As of 2018, the area also has one magic carpet. Road access and the lodge are on a ridge at an elevation of 2435 feet, overlooking a wooded, north-facing bowl.

The ski season typically runs from mid-December into late April, on weekends only. Tree and glade skiing opportunities abound. On at least one occasion, slopes were re-opened in May after a heavy snowfall. The slopes are patrolled by the National Ski Patrol.

== History ==
From 1949 until 1993, the resort went by the name Cleary Summit and was located 1 mile west of the present day ski area.

From 1962 until 1990, a pair of rope tows (upper and lower) served 900 vertical feet total and were generally operated by volunteers. From 1990 to 2014 the Birdsall family leased the resort, installing a double chairlift originally installed at the Silver Star Mountain Resort in British Columbia, to replace the ropes, and ran the hill as a family business. In the fall of 2017, a new 360' long Sun Kid Wunder Carpet was installed; it opened in January 2018.

In 2015 the area was acquired by Fairbanks doctors Andrew and Jacqueline Cox, who operated it as a ski area and Aurora viewing lodge. Extensive updates to the lodges, trails, lift, maintenance equipment and other facilities have been made. Over the next 10 years, more expansions including lodging, trail expansion, a new lodge, and new lifts are in the master development plan for the ski area.

In 2014, Ski Land hosted the Alpine Skiing event of the Arctic Winter Games. Timing boxes from this event can still be found on the mountain.

In 2016, Ski Land started a partnership with University of Alaska Fairbanks to provide all full-time UAF students are eligible to receive a free season pass if certain requirements are met.

In 2021 Ski Land was purchased by Fairbanks Ski Coalition, a 501(c)3 nonprofit. The nonprofit was created by the General Manager, Devin Larson, to take over from the Coxes and continue the progress that they had started.

== Facilities ==
Ski Land hosts two day lodges with fantastic views from the top of Cleary Summit. During the winter, these lodges are open on the Frida's through Monday's for skiing, with a restaurant, rental shop, and day use area. The Tamarack Grill Restaurant at the Fairbanks Cancer Care Lodge is open whenever skiing is open serving up made-in-house food and local beers form Fairbanks brewers.

Ski Land hosts a 3882' long Mueller Double Chair Lift, named Silver Star, that can bring guest up the mountain in approximately 10 minutes. The 360' Sun Kid Wonder Carpet, named Sunny Side, provides easy loading, unloading, and riding for beginners of all ages. A large new beginner area was made for the Sunny Side lift.

Because of a strong inversion, Ski Land is typically much warmer during the winter than Fairbanks and the surrounding areas.

The area encourages year-round, non-motorized, non-commercial, recreation for locals and visitors on its trail system.
