= 2016 Arctic Winter Games =

Multi-sports competition

2016 Arctic Winter Games Nuuk
- Nuuk 2016 Arctic Winter Games official emblem
- Host city: Nuuk
- Country: Kingdom of Denmark; Greenland
- Motto: Join — Feel — Jump
- Nations: 7 countries: Canada; Denmark; Finland; Norway; Russia; Sweden; United States
- Teams: 9 contingents: Alaska; Greenland; Northern Alberta; Northwest Territories; (Quebec) Nunavik Québec; Nunavut; Sápmi; Yamal-Nenets; Yukon
- Athletes: 1,238
- Events: 213
- Opening: March 6, 2016
- Closing: March 12, 2016
- Opened by: Asii Chemnitz Narup; Mayor of Sermersooq
- Closed by: Jens Brinch; President of the AWGIC
- Main venue: Inussivik
- Website: awg2016.org

The 2016 Arctic Winter Games, officially known with the slogan "Join — Feel — Jump", was a winter multi-sport event which took place in Nuuk, Greenland, between 6–12 March 2016. The elected host city was announced on 14 September 2012 by the Arctic Winter Games International Committee (AWGIC) in Whitehorse, Yukon, Canada.

The Arctic Winter Games is the world's largest multisport and cultural event for young people of the Arctic. The Games is an international biennial celebration of circumpolar sports and culture held for a week, each time with a different nation or region as the host. AWG celebrates sports, social interaction and culture. The Games contributes to creating an awareness on cultural diversity, and develops athletes to participate in the competitions with the focus on fair play. The Games binds the Arctic countries together and includes traditional games such as Arctic sports and Dené games.

Around 1,200 athletes from nine teams participated in the games. Around 4,000 people were involved in 2016 Arctic Winter Games, including all competitors and participants in sports and cultural events.

== Organization ==
The Government of Greenland, the Municipality of Sermersooq and the business community of Greenland are the owners and the hosts of the AWG2016. Led by a General Manager, the day-to-day operations and the practical work are handled by the AWG2016 Secretariat.

In September 2013, Maliina Abelsen was appointed as head of the Nuuk 2016 Organizing Committee.

=== Marketing ===
The 2016 Arctic Winter Games' mascot was a Seal named "Kuluk". Out of 228 different suggestions for the naming of the mascot competition, the name "Kuluk" won and was appointed by the steering committee.

=== Participants ===
Nine contingents participated in the 2016 Arctic Winter Games. The amount of athletes sent by each contingent is shown in parentheses in the list below.

- Alaska, United States (241)
- Greenland (120) (host)
- Northern Alberta, Canada (191)
- Northwest Territories, Canada (218)
- Nunavik, Quebec, Canada (57)
- Nunavut, Canada (142)
- Sámi people (31)
- Yamalo-Nenets, Russia (4)
- Yukon, Canada (234)

== Venues ==
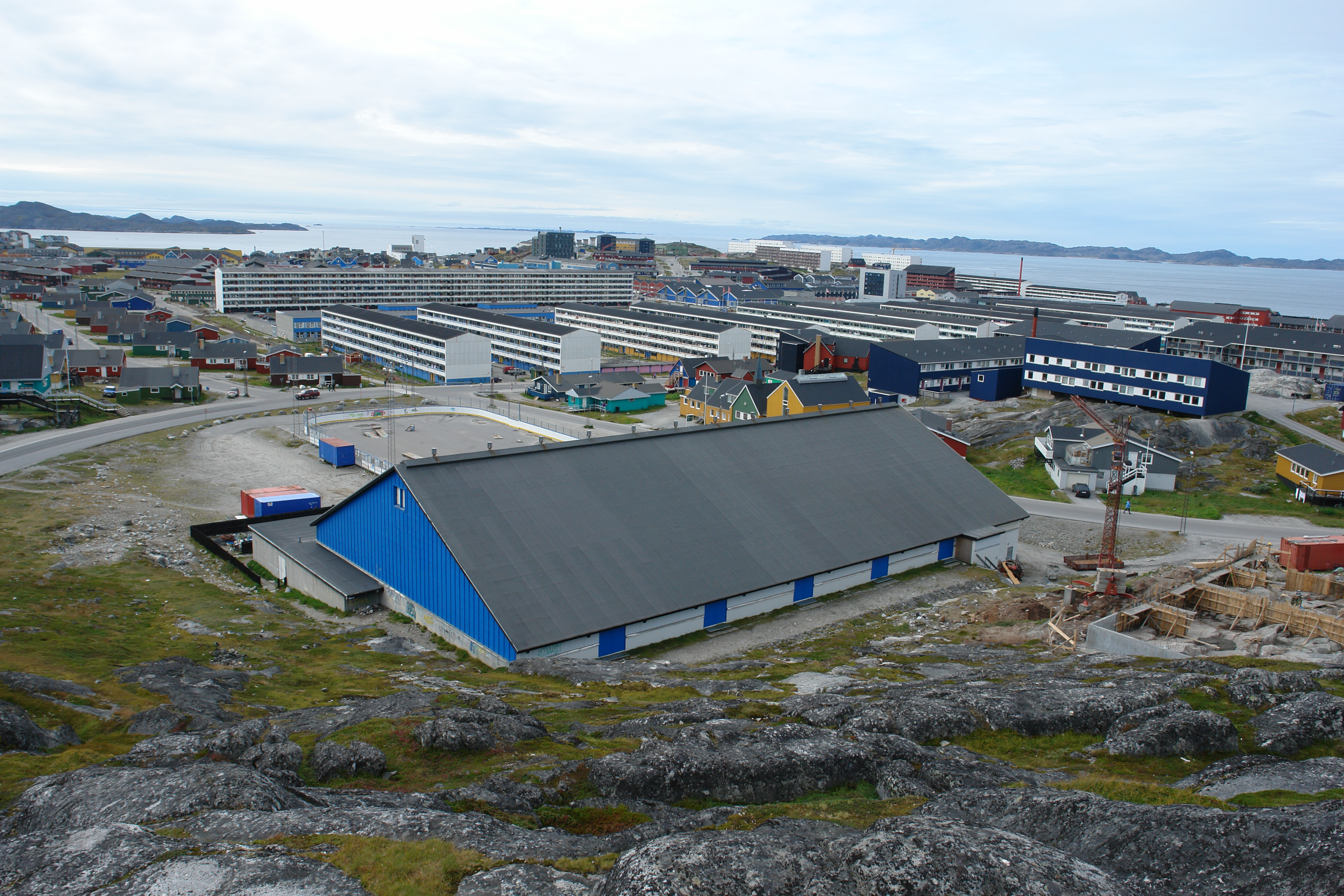
Godthåbhallen

The 2016 games were held at various sports venues and schools in and around Nuuk, the exception being the ice hockey events, which were held in Iqaluit, Canada. Opening and closing ceremonies were held at Inussivik.

=== Sports venues ===
The following venues hosted sports events during the games. Unless otherwise mentioned, the venues are located in Nuuk.

Venue	Events
AHL School	Basketball
Arnaitok Arena, Iqaluit, Canada	Ice hockey
Godthåbhallen	Futsal
GUX	Dene games (hand games), table tennis
Inussivik	Badminton, volleyball, opening ceremony, closing ceremony
Kangillinguit School	Wrestling
Nuussuaq Gym	Arctic sports
Qinngorput	Biathlon, snowshoe biathlon
Ravnedalen	Cross country skiing, snowshoeing
Sisorarfiit	Alpine skiing, Dene games (snow snake & pole push), snowboarding
USK School	Dene games

=== Cultural venues ===
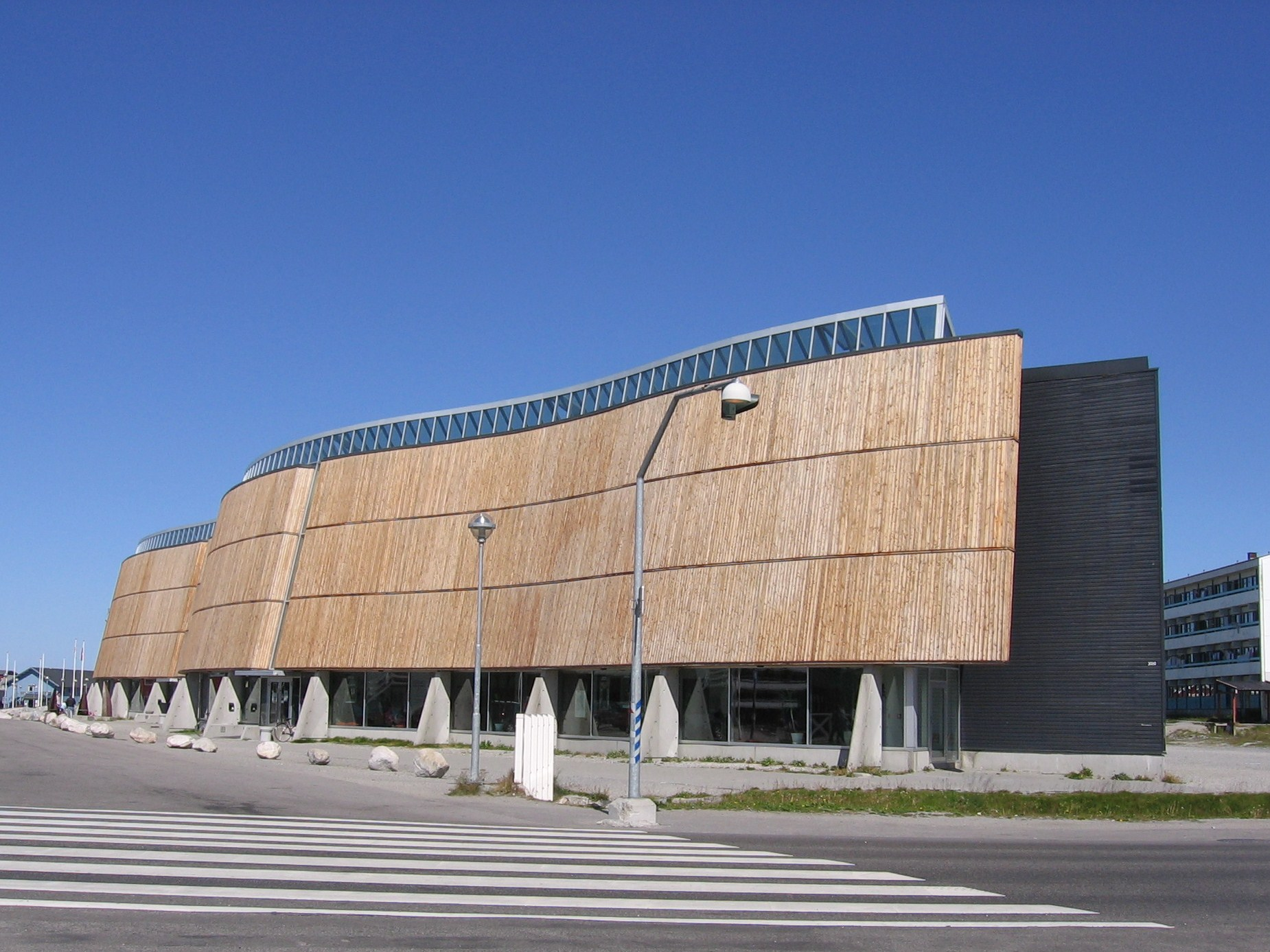
Katuaq

The following venues hosted cultural events during the games.

Venue	Events
Ilimmarfik	Exhibitions, community shows, workshops
Illorput	Workshops
Katuaq	Film festival, exhibitions, gala shows
Kittat	Workshops
National Theatre	Exhibitions, workshops
NUIF	Workshops
Nuuk Art Museum	Exhibitions, workshops
Nuuk Center	Community shows
Nuutoqaq	Fireworks

== Medal tally ==
Rank	Nation	Gold	Silver	Bronze	Total
1	Alaska	84	67	66	217
2	Greenland	39	23	19	81
3	Alberta North	29	32	27	88
4	Yukon	23	41	36	100
5	Northwest Territories	16	13	23	52
6	Sápmi	8	7	4	19
7	Nunavut	6	18	25	49
8	Nunavik Quebec	6	9	6	21
9	Yamal	2	5	1	8
Totals (9 entries)		213	215	207	635

== The Games ==
=== Sports ===
213 events in 15 sport disciplines were held at 2016 Arctic Winter Games program. Four skiing sports were held, alpine skiing, biathlon, cross-country skiing, and snowboarding. Two snowshoe events were held, snowshoe biathlon and snowshoeing. Two racquet sports were held, with badminton and table tennis. Team sports held were basketball, futsal, ice hockey, and volleyball. Traditional Inuit sports were also held, with Arctic sports, Dene games, and wrestling, the latter also including events for traditional wrestling.

The 2016 Arctic Winter Games was the first edition of the games to have futsal on the program. From 1980 to 2014 the sports program had included indoor soccer, but it was replaced by futsal in the 2016 games.

The 2016 games were the first edition of the Arctic Winter Games to not include curling and the first since 1990 to not include dog mushing. Gymnastics, figure skating and speed skating were also removed from the program. For all excluded sports the reasoning for their removal from the programme were a lack of facilities.

- Alpine skiing (13)
- Arctic sports (35)
- Badminton (10)
- Basketball (2)
- Biathlon (14)
- Cross-country skiing (24)
- Dene games (24)
- Futsal (5)
- Ice hockey (2)
- Snowboarding (16)
- Snowshoe biathlon (14)
- Snowshoeing (14)
- Table tennis (12)
- Volleyball (2)
- Wrestling (26)

=== Calendar ===
OC	Opening ceremony	●	Cultural events	●	Event competitions	1	Event finals	CC	Closing ceremony

March	4 Fri	5 Sat	6 Sun	7 Mon	8 Tue	9 Wed	10 Thu	11 Fri	Total
Ceremonies			OC					CC	
Cultural events	●	●	●	●	●	●	●	●	
Alpine skiing					4	4	5		13
Arctic sports					9	12	7	7	35
Badminton				●	●	●	10		10
Basketball				●	●	●	2		2
Biathlon					4	4	4	2	14
Cross country skiing					6	6	6	6	24
Dene games				4	4	4	4	8	24
Futsal				●	●	●	●	5	5
Ice hockey				●	●	●	2		2
Snowboarding					8	4		4	16
Snowshoe biathlon					4	4	4	2	14
Snowshoeing					4	6	4		14
Table tennis					●	2	10		12
Volleyball				●	●	●	2		2
Wrestling					2	12	12		26
Total events	0	0	0	4	45	58	72	34	213
March	4 Fri	5 Sat	6 Sun	7 Mon	8 Tue	9 Wed	10 Thu	11 Fri	Total

== Culture ==
The Arctic Winter Games celebrates culture and creates in the participants an awareness of cultural similarities and dissimilarities. Cultural exchange and social interaction are important parts of the Games. Each participating contingent contributes with performances in dance, song, music, plays or art. These cultural events reflect the traditional as well as the modern cultures of the Arctic. Workshops on a number of cultural, artistic and sports areas were open throughout the Arctic Winter Games.

== Hodgson Trophy ==
At each Arctic Winter Games, the AWG International Committee presents the Hodgson Trophy to the contingent whose athletes best exemplify the ideals of fair play and team spirit. Team members also receive a distinctive pin in recognition of their accomplishment. The Alaskan team and delegation won the Hodgson Trophy at the 2016 Arctic Winter Games.

Preceded by Fairbanks 2014	Arctic Winter Games; Nuuk; 2016 Arctic Winter Games	Succeeded by South Slave 2018
