= 2014 Arctic Winter Games =

Multi-sports competition

2014 Arctic Winter Games Fairbanks
- Host city: Fairbanks
- Country: United States; Alaska
- Motto: Great Spirit - Northern Dreams
- Nations: 7 countries: Canada; Denmark; Finland; Norway; Russia; Sweden; United States
- Teams: 9 contingents: Alaska; Greenland; Northern Alberta; Northwest Territories; (Quebec) Nunavik Québec; Nunavut; Sápmi; Yamal-Nenets; Yukon
- Athletes: 1,472
- Events: 265
- Opening: March 16, 2014
- Closing: March 22, 2014
- Main venue: Carlson Center
- Website: awg2014.org

The 2014 Arctic Winter Games, officially known with the slogan "Great Spirit - Northern Dreams", was a winter multi-sport event which took place in Fairbanks, Alaska, United States, between 15 and 22 March 2014. Some events took place in North Pole.

The Arctic Winter Games is the world's largest multisport and cultural event for young people of the Arctic. The Games is an international biennial celebration of circumpolar sports and culture held for a week, each time with a different nation or region as the host. AWG celebrates sports, social interaction and culture. The Games contributes to creating an awareness on cultural diversity, and develops athletes to participate in the competitions with the focus on fair play. The Games binds the Arctic countries together and includes traditional games such as Arctic sports and Dené games.

Around 1,400 athletes from nine teams participated in the games.

== Organization ==
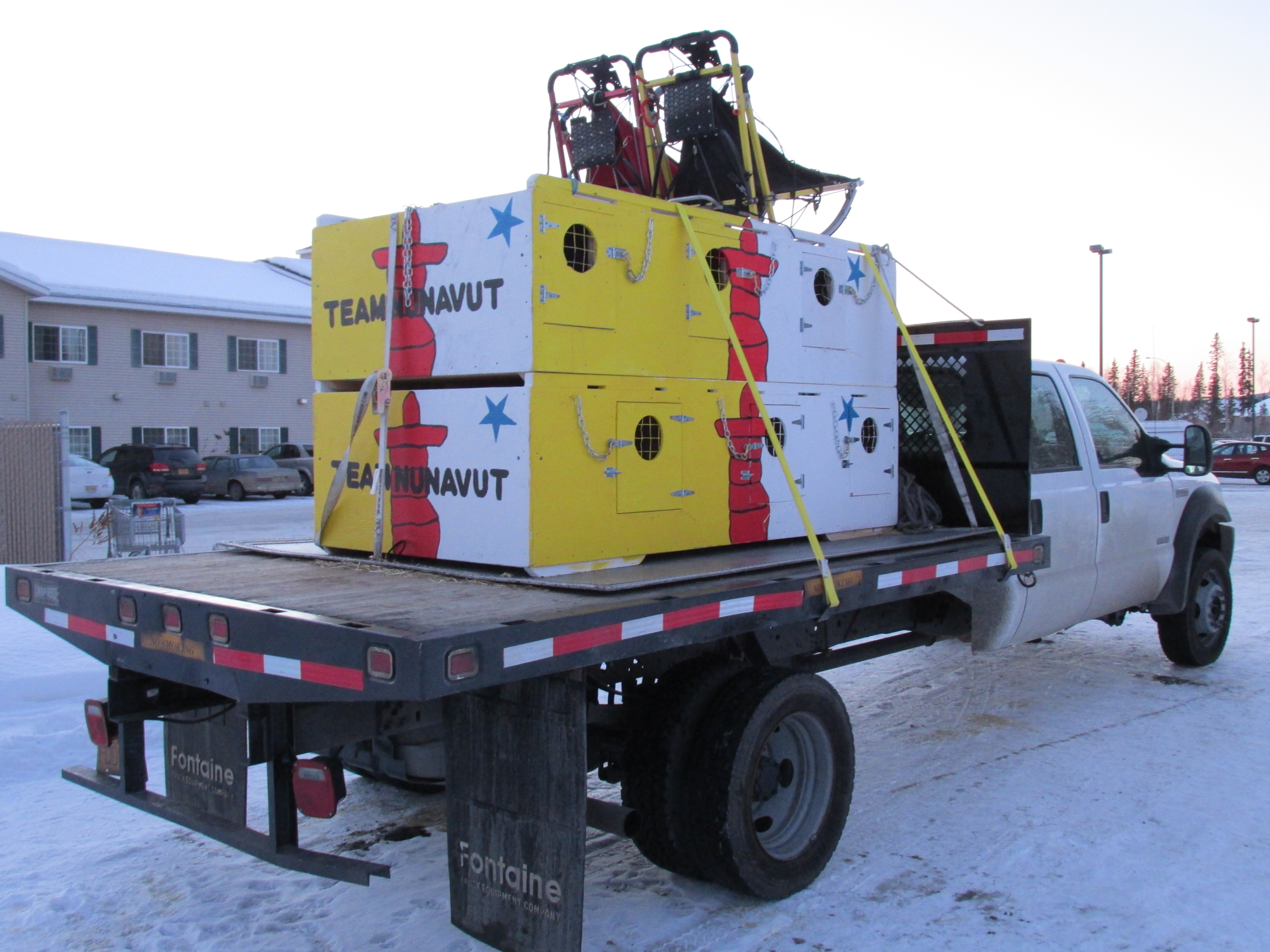
Flatbed truck with sleds and portable kennels for Team Nunavut, in Fairbanks, during the 2014 Arctic Winter Games.

The 2014 Arctic Winter Games were set in Fairbanks, Alaska. Jeff Jacobson was the president of the host society and Perry Ahsogeak the vice president. Karen Lane was the general manager.

=== Participants ===
Nine contingents participated in the 2014 Arctic Winter Games. The amount of athletes sent by each contingent is shown in parentheses in the list below.

- Alaska, United States (286) (host)
- Greenland (108)
- Northern Alberta, Canada (188)
- Northwest Territories, Canada (274)
- Nunavik, Quebec, Canada (62)
- Nunavut, Canada (214)
- Sámi people (33)
- Yamalo-Nenets, Russia (70)
- Yukon, Canada (237)

== Venues ==
The 2014 games were held at various sports venues and schools in Fairbanks. Opening and closing ceremonies were held at Carlson Center.

=== Sports Venues ===
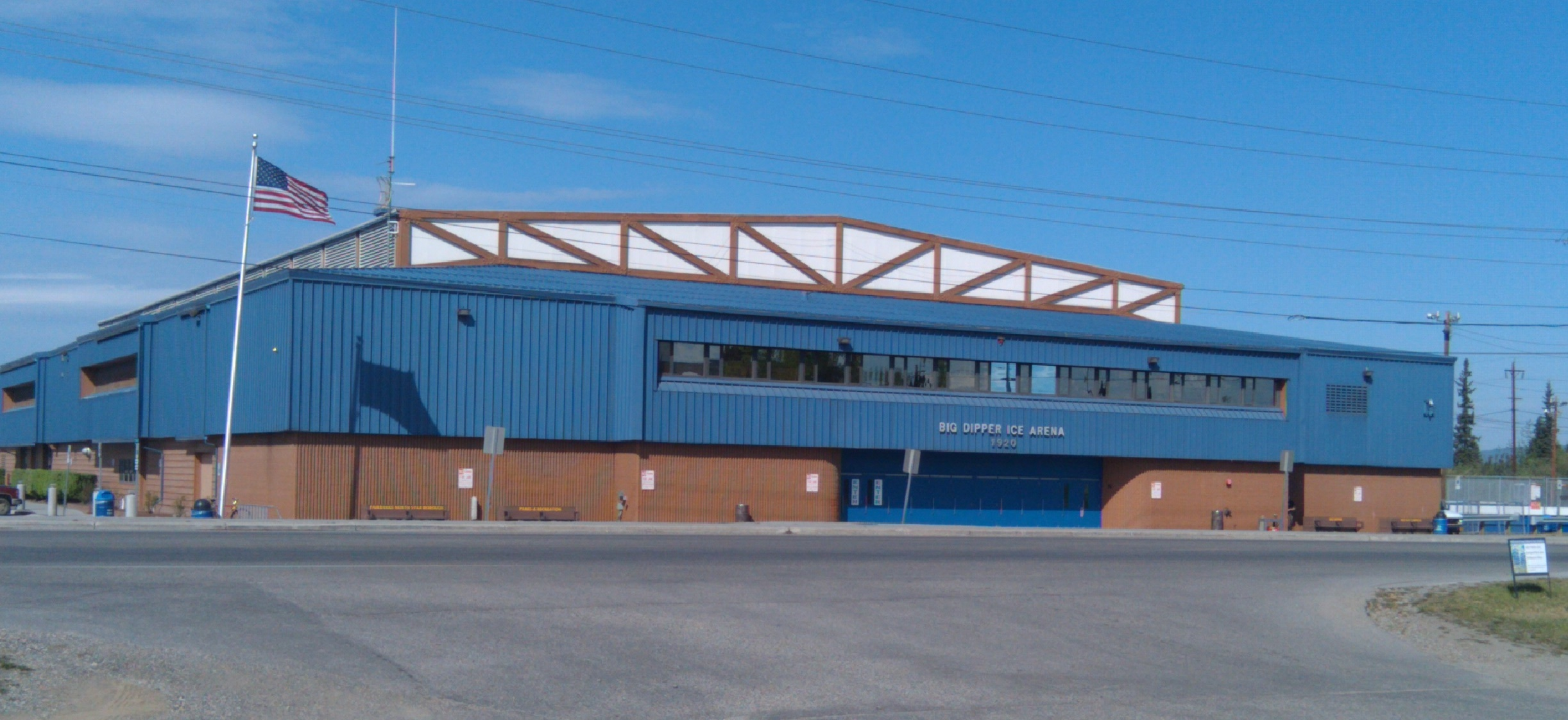
Big Dipper Ice Arena in Fairbanks.

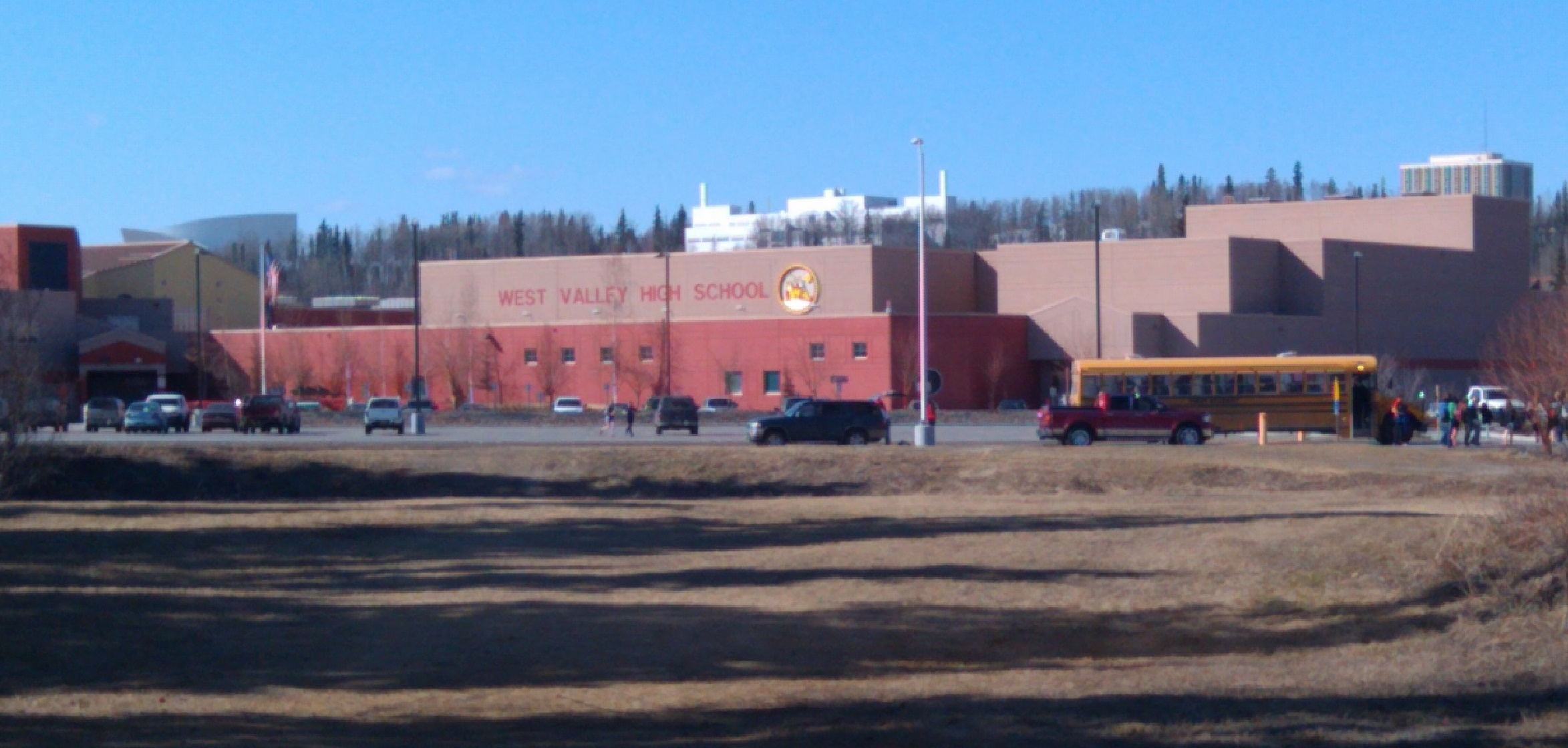
West Valley High School in Fairbanks.

The following venues hosted sports events during the games. All locations were located in or around Fairbanks unless mentioned otherwise.

Venue	Events
Big Dipper Ice Arena	Ice hockey
Birch Hill Recreation Area	Cross country skiing, biathlon, snowshoe biathlon, snowshoeing
Carlson Center	Figure skating, short track speed skating
Fairbanks Curling Club	Curling
Fort Wainwright Birch Hill	Snowboarding
Gymnastics Inc.	Gymnastics
Lathrop High School	Dene games
Hutchison High School	Table tennis
Jeff Studdert Fairgrounds	Dog mushing
Lathrop High School	Arctic sports
North Pole High School, North Pole	Badminton
North Pole Middle School, North Pole	Wrestling
Randy Smith Middle School	Dene games
Ryan Middle School	Dene games
Skiland	Alpine skiing
UAF Hulbert Nanook Terrain Park	Snowboarding
UAF Patty Center	Basketball, ice hockey
UAF Student Recreation Center	Indoor soccer
West Valley High School	Volleyball

=== Cultural and other venues ===
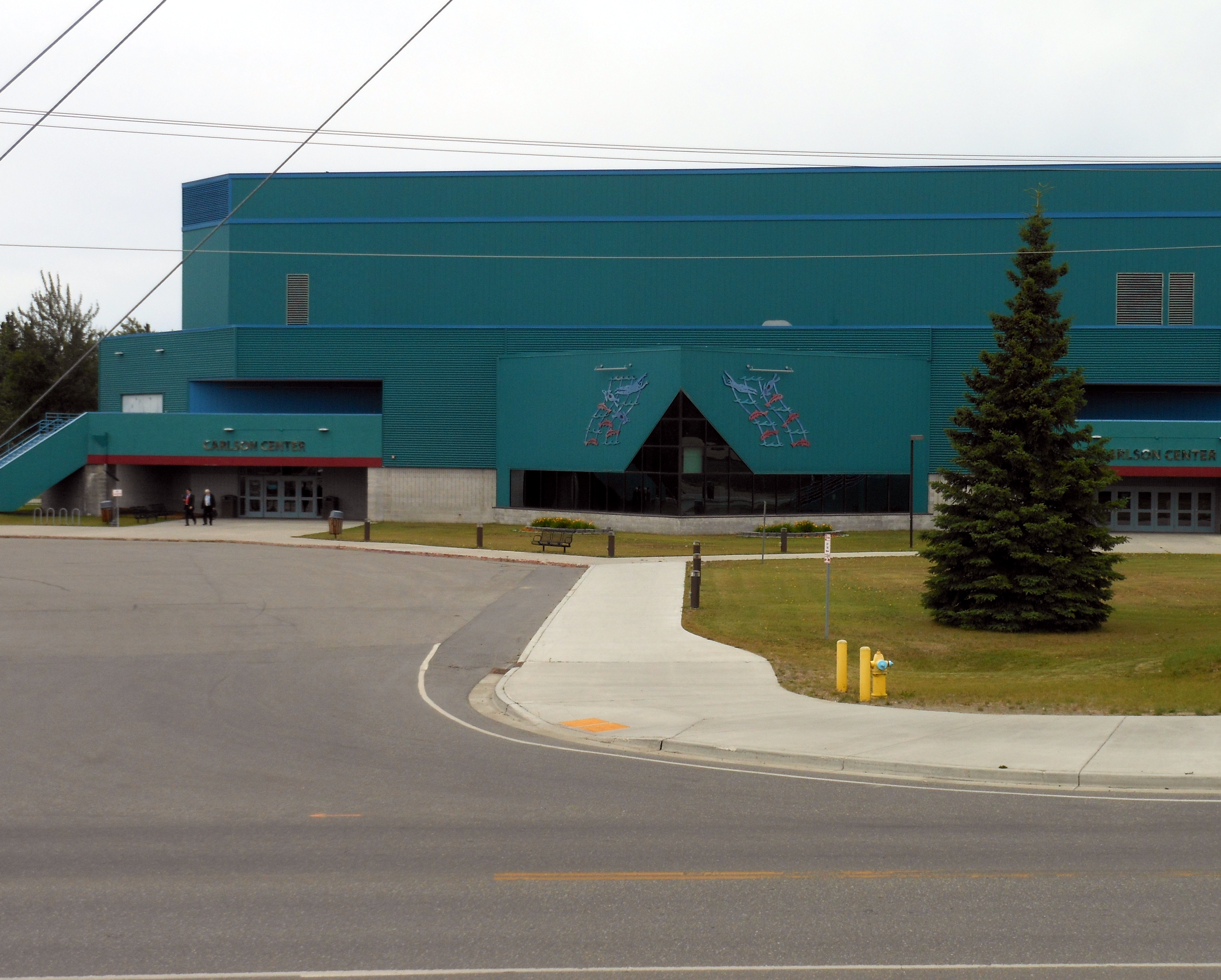
Carlson Center in Fairbanks.

The following venues hosted cultural and other events during the games. All locations were located in or around Fairbanks unless mentioned otherwise.

Venue	Events
2nd Avenue downtown	Parka Parade
420 Cushman Street	Fairbanks Community Museum
Arctic Winter Games Headquarters and Store	Headquarter and store
Bentley Mall	'Lunch Time Performance' venue
Carlson Center	Opening ceremony (presented by ConocoPhillips) and closing ceremony (presented by GCI)
Co-Op Plaza	'Lunch Time Performance' venue
Jeff Studdert Racegrounds	GCI Open North American Sled Dog Race
George Horner Ice Park	BP World Ice Art Championships
Grange Hall, North Pole	AWG Kick-Off Party, Yamal in the Children's Eye exhibit
Doyon, Limited headquarters	'Lunch Time Performance' venue
Hering Auditorium	Cultural Gala
Morris Thompson Cultural and Visitors Center	Deme drumming demonstration
Noel Wien Public Library	'Lunch Time Performance' venue
Pioneer Park	Various attractions (Dog Sled Rides, Museums & Train Rides, Pin Central)
Pioneer Park Centennial Center	Folk Art Fest and Expo
Pioneer Park Theatre	Film festival and The Color of Gold presented by Opera Fairbanks
UAF Campus Great Hall	College fair (presented by Flint Hills Resources)
University of Alaska Museum of the North	Denalai Legacy 100 Years on the Mountain

== Medal tally ==
Rank	Team	Gold	Silver	Bronze	Total
1	Alaska	68	61	75	204
2	Yamal	55	58	21	134
3	Alberta North	47	49	35	131
4	Northwest Territories	25	27	34	86
5	Yukon	23	26	38	87
6	Greenland	23	23	14	60
7	Sápmi	13	5	7	25
8	Nunavik Quebec	7	11	13	31
9	Nunavut	6	7	19	32
Totals (9 entries)		267	267	256	790

== The Games ==
=== Sports ===
265 events in 20 sport disciplines were scheduled in the 2014 Arctic Winter Games program. Four skiing sports were held, with alpine skiing, biathlon, cross-country skiing, and snowboarding. Two snowshoe events were held, with snowshoe biathlon and snowshoeing. Two racquet sports were held, with badminton and table tennis. Two skating events were held, those being figure skating and short track speed skating. Team sports held were basketball, indoor soccer, ice hockey, volleyball, and curling. Traditional Inuit sports were also held, with Arctic sports, Dene games, dog mushing, and wrestling, the latter also including events for traditional wrestling. Also held was gymnastics.

- Alpine skiing (13)
- Arctic sports (35)
- Badminton (10)
- Basketball (2)
- Biathlon (14)
- Cross-country skiing (24)
- Curling (3)
- Dene games (24)
- Dog mushing (6)
- Figure skating (13)
- Gymnastics (6)
- Ice hockey (3)
- Indoor soccer (5)
- Short track speed skating (20)
- Snowboarding (20)
- Snowshoe biathlon (14)
- Snowshoeing (14)
- Table tennis (12)
- Volleyball (2)
- Wrestling (25)

=== Calendar ===
OC	Opening ceremony	●	Cultural events	●	Event competitions	1	Event finals	CC	Closing ceremony

March	16 Sun	17 Mon	18 Tue	19 Wed	20 Thu	21 Fri	22 Sat	Total
Ceremonies	OC						CC	
Cultural events	●	●	●	●	●	●	●	
Alpine skiing			4	4	5			13
Arctic sports		5	8	8	5	9		35
Badminton		●	●	●	●	●	10	10
Basketball		●	●	●	●	●	2	2
Biathlon		4	4		4	2		14
Cross country skiing		6	6		6	6		24
Curling	●	●	●	●	2	●	1	3
Dene games		4	4	4	4	8		24
Dog mushing		2	2		2			6
Figure skating			4	8	1			13
Gymnastics			1		5			6
Ice hockey		●	●	●	●	1	2	3
Indoor soccer	●	●	●	●	●	●	5	5
Short track speed skating		4	4		4	8		20
Snowboarding		4	4	4	8			20
Snowshoe biathlon		4	4		4	2		14
Snowshoeing		4		6		4		14
Table tennis		●		●	●	12		12
Volleyball	●	●	●	●	●	2		2
Wrestling		●	1		12	12		25
Total events	0	37	46	34	62	66	20	265
March	16 Sun	17 Mon	18 Tue	19 Wed	20 Thu	21 Fri	22 Sat	Total

== Culture ==
Each edition of the Arctic Winter Games showcases a series of different cultures from around the Arctic. Especially indigenous culture is on display, with cultural exhibitions and activities. Many other cultural events are also held throughout the games.

== Hodgson Trophy ==
At each Arctic Winter Games, the AWG International Committee presents the Hodgson Trophy to the contingent whose athletes best exemplify the ideals of fair play and team spirit. Team members also receive a distinctive pin in recognition of their accomplishment. The Greenlandic team and delegation won the Hodgson Trophy at the 2014 Arctic Winter Games.

Preceded by Whitehorse 2012	Arctic Winter Games; Fairbanks; 2014 Arctic Winter Games	Succeeded by Nuuk 2016
