= Northern Periphery Programme =

The Northern Periphery Programme or NPP is a European Union-funded scheme to promote cooperation and commonalities amongst the people living in the northern fringe of Europe. The programme provides the opportunity for organisations from the programme area to work together on joint projects concerning common issues and problems. As a result, this programme has collected extensive expertise related to living and working in the far north.

== Member nations ==
The programme covers parts of Sweden, Finland, Norway, Scotland, Northern Ireland and the Republic of Ireland, as well as all of the Faroes, Iceland, and Greenland. Much of the area sits north of the Arctic Circle, and includes some of the world's northernmost communities. The secretariat of the programme is located in Copenhagen.

Unique minorities in this area include Inuit, Samis and Scottish and Irish Gaels.

== See also ==
- Interreg
- Arctic Winter Games
