= 2018 Arctic Winter Games =

Multi-sports competition

2018 Arctic Winter Games South Slave
- Host city: Fort Smith; Hay River; K'atl'odeeche First Nation
- Country: Canada; Northwest Territories
- Motto: Find Your Power!!!
- Nations: 7 countries: Canada; Denmark; Finland; Norway; Russia; Sweden; United States
- Teams: 9 contingents: Alaska; Greenland; Northern Alberta; Northwest Territories; (Quebec) Nunavik Québec; Nunavut; Sápmi; Yamal-Nenets; Yukon
- Athletes: 1,404
- Events: 251
- Opening: March 18, 2018
- Closing: March 24, 2018
- Opened by: Lynn Napier-Buckley; Mayor of Fort Smith
- Closed by: Jens Brinch; President of the AWGIC
- Main venue: Northwestel AWG Recreation Center
- Website: awg2018.org

The 2018 Arctic Winter Games, officially known with the slogan "Find Your Power!!!", is a winter multi-sport event which took place in the South Slave Region of the Northwest Territories, between 18–24 March 2018.

The Arctic Winter Games is the world's largest multisport and cultural event for young people of the Arctic. The Games is an international biennial celebration of circumpolar sports and culture held for a week, each time with a different nation or region as the host. AWG celebrates sports, social interaction and culture. The Games contributes to creating an awareness on cultural diversity, and develops athletes to participate in the competitions with the focus on fair play. The Games binds the Arctic countries together and includes traditional games such as Arctic sports and Dené games.

Around 1,400 athletes from nine teams participated in the games. Around 4,000 people in total took part in the Arctic Winter Games, including all competitors and participants in sports and cultural events.

== Organization ==
The 2018 Arctic Winter Games were set in Hay River and Fort Smith. Todd Shafer was chosen as general manager of the host society and Greg Rowe as president.

=== Marketing ===
2018's mascot was a Snowy owl named "Kechi". Out of 80 different suggestions for the design of the mascot competition, the snowy owl won and was appointed by the steering committee.

=== Participants ===
Nine contingents participated in the 2018 Arctic Winter Games. The number of athletes sent by each contingent is shown in parentheses in the list below.

- Alaska, United States (224)
- Greenland (107)
- Northern Alberta, Canada (185)
- Northwest Territories, Canada (277) (host)
- Nunavik, Quebec, Canada (52)
- Nunavut, Canada (196)
- Sámi people (29)
- Yamalo-Nenets, Russia (71)
- Yukon, Canada (263)

== Venues ==
The 2018 games were held at various sports venues, schools and facilities in Fort Smith, Hay River and the K'atl'odeeche First Nation.

=== Sports venues ===
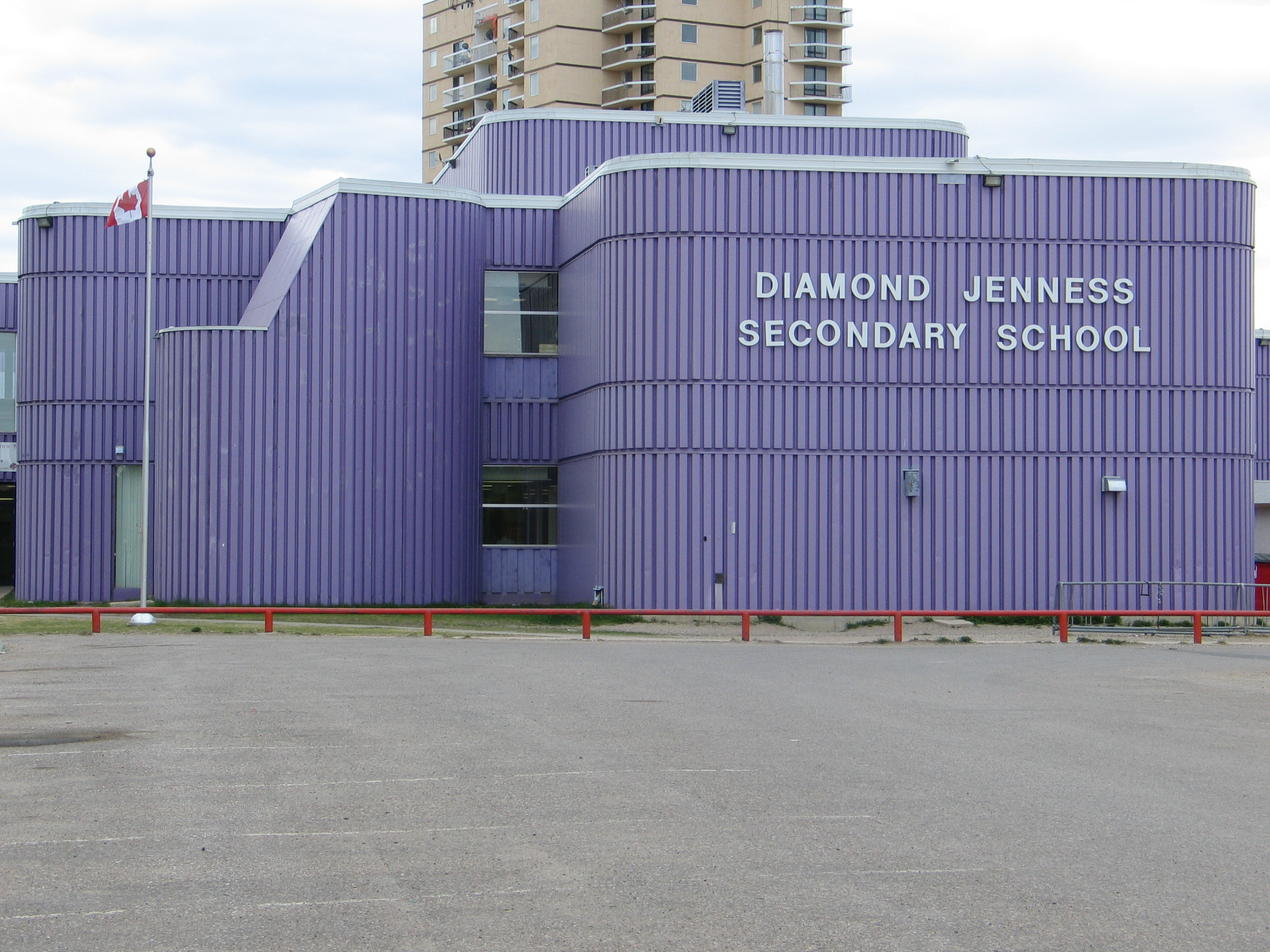
Diamond Jenness Secondary School in Hay River

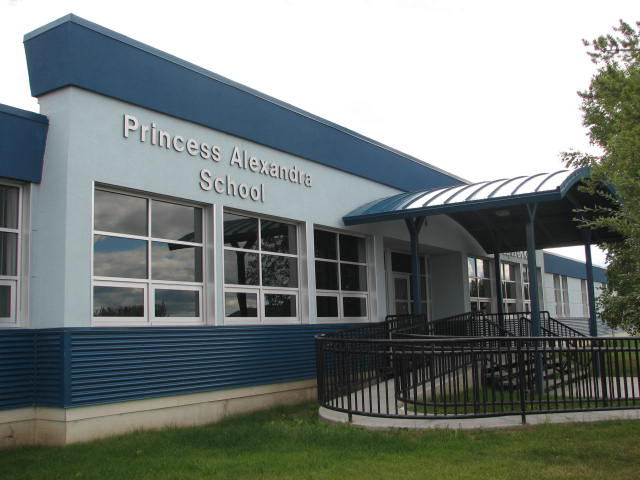
Princess Alexandra School in Hay River

The following venues hosted sports events during the games.

Venue	Events
Chief Lamalice Complex, K'atl'odeeche First Nation	Dene games
Dene Village Road, K'atl'odeeche First Nation	Dog mushing
Diamond Jenness Secondary School, Hay River	Futsal
Fort Smith Centennial Arena, Fort Smith	Figure skating, ice hockey, short track speed skating
Fort Smith Nordic Centre, Fort Smith	Cross country skiing
Fort Smith Recreation Centre, Fort Smith	Arctic Sports, basketball, curling
Harry Camsell School, Hay River	Badminton
Hay River Ski Club, Hay River	Biathlon, snowshoe biathlon, snowshoeing
Joseph B. Tyrell School, Fort Smith	Table tennis
Northwestel AWG Recreation Center, Hay River	Ice hockey, volleyball, opening ceremony, closing ceremony
Princess Alexandra School, Hay River	Badminton
Riverside Park, Fort Smith	Snowboarding
Rowe's Construction Head Office, Hay River	Gymnastics, wrestling

=== Cultural venues ===
The following venues hosted cultural events during the games.

Venue	Events
Centennial Library, Hay River	Workshops
Chief Sunrise Gymnasium, Hay River	Marketplace
Northern Life Museum, Fort Smith	Workshops
Uncle Gabe's Friendship Centre, Fort Smith	Marketplace

== Medal tally ==
* Host nation (Northwest Territories)

Rank	Team	Gold	Silver	Bronze	Total
1	Alaska	51	38	36	125
2	Yamal	51	38	20	109
3	Alberta North	50	35	48	133
4	Yukon	35	41	46	122
5	Northwest Territories*	20	43	39	102
6	Greenland	18	25	22	65
7	Nunavut	15	17	23	55
8	Nunavik Quebec	8	8	5	21
9	Sápmi	5	5	6	16
Totals (9 entries)		253	250	245	748

== The Games ==
=== Sports ===
251 events in 19 sport disciplines were scheduled in the 2018 Arctic Winter Games program. Curling, dog mushing, figure skating, gymnastics and short track speed skating all returned to the programme after their absence in 2016. 3 skiing sports were held, with biathlon, cross-country skiing and snowboarding. 2 snowshoe events were held, with snowshoe biathlon and snowshoeing. 2 racquet sports were held, with badminton and table tennis. 2 skating events were held, those being figure skating and short track speed skating. Team sports held were basketball, futsal, ice hockey, volleyball and curling. Traditional Inuit sports were also held, with Arctic sports, Dene games, dog mushing and wrestling, the latter also including events for traditional wrestling. Also held was gymnastics.

Alpine skiing was removed from the sports programme due to a lack of facilities.

- Arctic sports (35)
- Badminton (10)
- Basketball (2)
- Biathlon (14)
- Cross-country skiing (24)
- Curling (2)
- Dene games (24)
- Dog mushing (6)
- Figure skating (13)
- Futsal (5)
- Gymnastics (6)
- Ice hockey (3)
- Short track speed skating (20)
- Snowboarding (20)
- Snowshoe biathlon (14)
- Snowshoeing (14)
- Table tennis (12)
- Volleyball (2)
- Wrestling (25)

=== Calendar ===
OC	Opening ceremony	●	Cultural events	●	Event competitions	1	Event finals	CC	Closing ceremony

March	18 Sun	19 Mon	20 Tue	21 Wed	22 Thu	23 Fri	24 Sat	Total
Ceremonies	OC						CC	
Cultural events	●	●	●	●	●	●	●	
Arctic sports		8	8	6	4	9		35
Badminton		●	●	●	●	●	10	10
Basketball		●	●	●	●	2		2
Biathlon		4	4		4	2		14
Cross country skiing		6	6		6	6		24
Curling		●	●	●	2			2
Dene games		4	4	4	4	8		24
Dog mushing		2	2		2			6
Figure skating		4		8	1			13
Futsal		●	●	●	●	●	5	5
Gymnastics				1		5		6
Ice hockey		●	●	●	●	3		3
Short track speed skating	●	4	4		4	8		20
Snowboarding		4	4	4	4	4		20
Snowshoe biathlon		4	4		4	2		14
Snowshoeing		4		6		4		14
Table tennis			●	1	●	11		12
Volleyball		●	●	●	●	●	2	2
Wrestling		1			12		12	25
Total events	0	45	36	30	47	64	29	251
March	18 Sun	19 Mon	20 Tue	21 Wed	22 Thu	23 Fri	24 Sat	Total

== Culture ==
The Arctic Winter Games celebrates culture and creates in the participants an awareness of cultural similarities and dissimilarities. Cultural exchange and social interaction are important parts of the Games. Each participating contingent contributes with performances in dance, song, music, plays or art. These cultural events reflect the traditional as well as the modern cultures of the Arctic. Several shows, exhibitions and workshops were available throughout the games.

== Hodgson Trophy ==
At each Arctic Winter Games, the AWG International Committee presents the Hodgson Trophy to the contingent whose athletes best exemplify the ideals of fair play and team spirit. Team members also receive a distinctive pin in recognition of their accomplishment. The Alaskan team and delegation won the Hodgson Trophy at the 2018 Arctic Winter Games.

Preceded by Nuuk 2016	Arctic Winter Games; South Slave Region; 2018 Arctic Winter Games	Succeeded by ~~Whitehorse 2020~~; Wood Buffalo 2023
