= Inussivik =

Sports venue in Nuuk, Greenland

Coordinates: 64°10′51″N 51°43′57″W

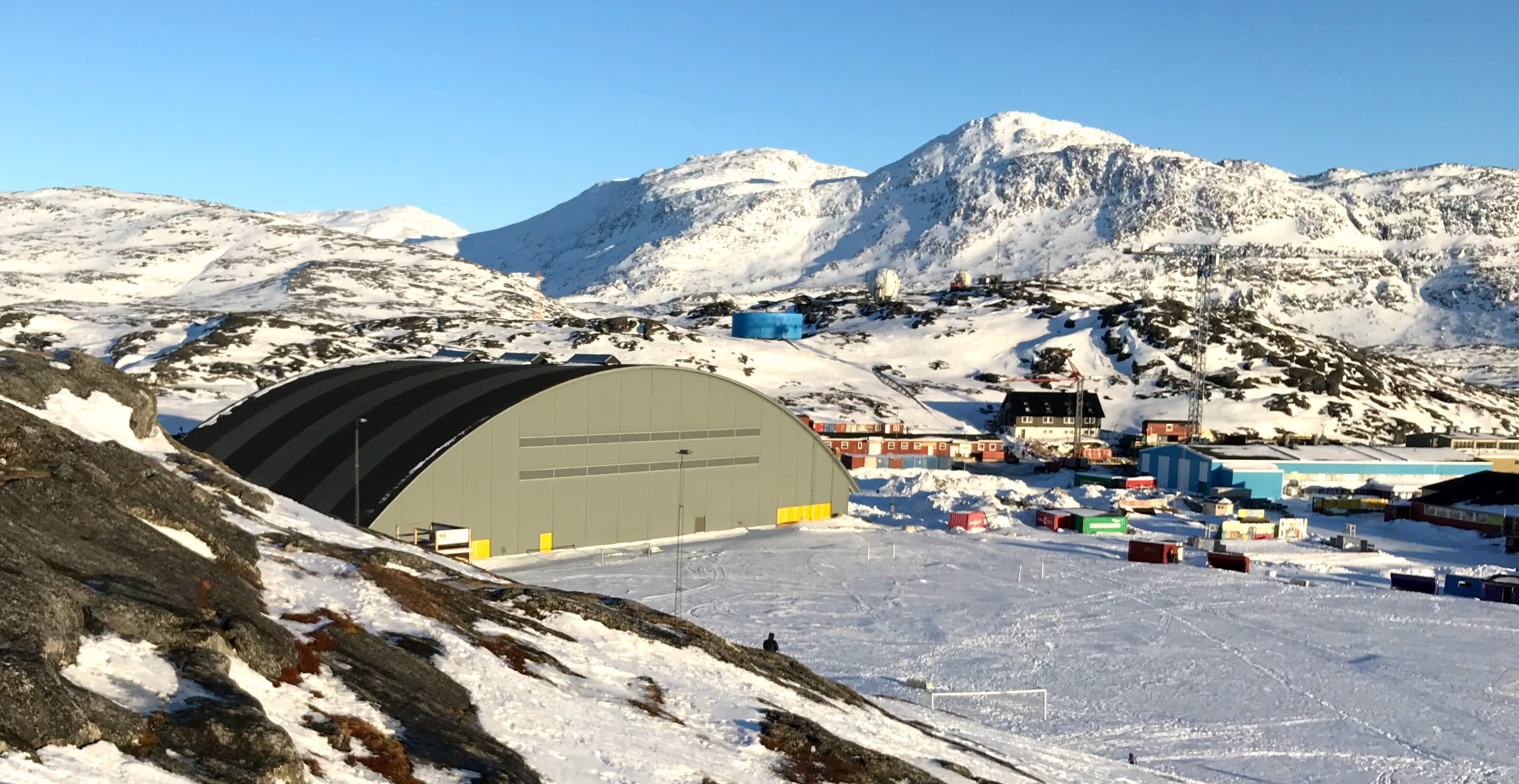
- Inussivik exterior
- Interactive map of Inussivik
- Location: Nuuk (Godthåb), Sermersooq, Greenland
- Owner: Municipality of Sermersooq
- Operator: Greenland Handball Federation
- Capacity: 1,035
- Surface: Indoor

Construction
- Opened: 2002

Tenants
- Team Grønland (men); Team Grønland (women)

Website
- www.ghb-hallen.gl

Inussivik is an indoor arena located in Nuuk, the capital city of Greenland, that was originally constructed for the 2002 Arctic Winter Games. The arena is used for sports, especially team handball which is considered the national sport of Greenland, concerts, and cultural events.

Inussivik has a capacity of around 1,000 people and is located on a complex with Nuuk Stadium, the country's national stadium.

The arena played host to the 2018 Pan American Men's Handball Championship and 2023 Nor.Ca. Women's Handball Championship.
