= 2006 Arctic Winter Games =

Multi-sports competition

- Host city: Kenai Peninsula, Alaska, United States
- Nations: 7 countries: Canada; Denmark; Finland; Norway; Russia; Sweden; United States
- Teams: 9 territories: Alaska; Greenland; Northern Alberta; Northwest Territories; (Quebec) Nunavik Québec; Nunavut; Sápmi; Yamal-Nenets; Yukon
- Athletes: approx. 2000
- Opening: 5 March 2006
- Closing: 11 March 2006
- Website: www.awg2006.org

The 2006 Arctic Winter Games' were held between 5 March 2006 and 11 March 2006 on the Kenai Peninsula, Alaska, United States. Approximately 2,000 athletes, coaches, team staff and officials participated in the 19th edition of the Arctic Winter Games.

Events were held mostly in the larger towns of Soldotna and Kenai, along with Homer (curling) and the Alyeska Ski Resort in Girdwood (alpine skiing and snowboarding). Soldotna, Kenai, Homer, and the town of Seward also hosted cultural events. This was the fifth time Alaska had hosted the games.

== Participants ==
- Alaska (host contingent)
- Greenland
- Northwest Territories
- Nunavik, Quebec (traditionally defined Northern Inuit region of the Nord-du-Québec administrative region in Quebec)
- Nunavut
- Northern Alberta
- Russia (because only the Yamalo-Nenets Autonomous Okrug participated they were referred to as team Russia, competing under the Russian flag)
- Sámi (Sami peoples of Norway, Sweden, and Finland collectively)
- Yukon

The 2008 Arctic Winter Games were held in Yellowknife, Northwest Territories.

== Events ==
Competition was held in alpine skiing, badminton, basketball, biathlon, cross-country skiing, curling, Arctic sports (including Dene and Inuit games), dog mushing, figure skating, gymnastics, ice hockey, indoor soccer, short-track speed skating, snowboarding, snowshoe biathlon, snowshoeing, speed skating, table tennis, volleyball, and wrestling.

== 2006 medal tally ==
(Unofficially listed with number of gold medals taking priority followed by silvers.)

Team	Gold	Silver	Bronze
Alaska	80	64	47
Alberta North	42	45	41
Northwest Territories	28	41	36
Yamal-Nenets	22	21	7
Greenland	20	17	11
Yukon	17	20	44
Nunavut	13	24	38
Nunavik Quebec	13	6	8
(Sápmi) Sáami	5	6	10
