= 2010 Arctic Winter Games =

Multi-sports competition

- Host city: Grande Prairie, Alberta
- Country: Canada
- Nations: 7
- Teams: 9
- Athletes: 2000+

The 2010 Arctic Winter Games were held in Grande Prairie, Alberta, Canada from March 6 to 13th.

The Arctic Winter Games is an international biannual celebration of circumpolar sports and culture, held in Canada or Alaska.

Over 2,000 athletes from nine teams (Alaska, Alberta North, Yukon, Yamal-Nenets, Northwest Territories, Greenland, Nunavik Québec, Nunavut and Saami) participated in the games.

Sports included alpine skiing, arctic sports, badminton, basketball, biathlon, curling, dene games, dog mushing, figure skating, freestyle skiing, gymnastics, hockey, indoor soccer, snowboarding, snowshoeing, speed skating, table tennis, volleyball and wrestling.

== Medal tally ==
Rank	Team	Gold	Silver	Bronze	Total
1	Alaska	87	85	79	251
2	Alberta North	43	56	46	145
3	Yukon	37	37	27	101
4	Yamal-Nenets	35	21	8	64
5	Northwest Territories	31	28	48	107
6	Greenland	18	16	15	49
7	(Quebec) Nunavik Québec	12	10	13	35
8	Nunavut	9	16	24	49
9	Sápmi	3	5	2	10
Totals (9 entries)		275	274	262	811

== See also ==
- 2006 Arctic Winter Games
- 2008 Arctic Winter Games
