= Arctic sports =

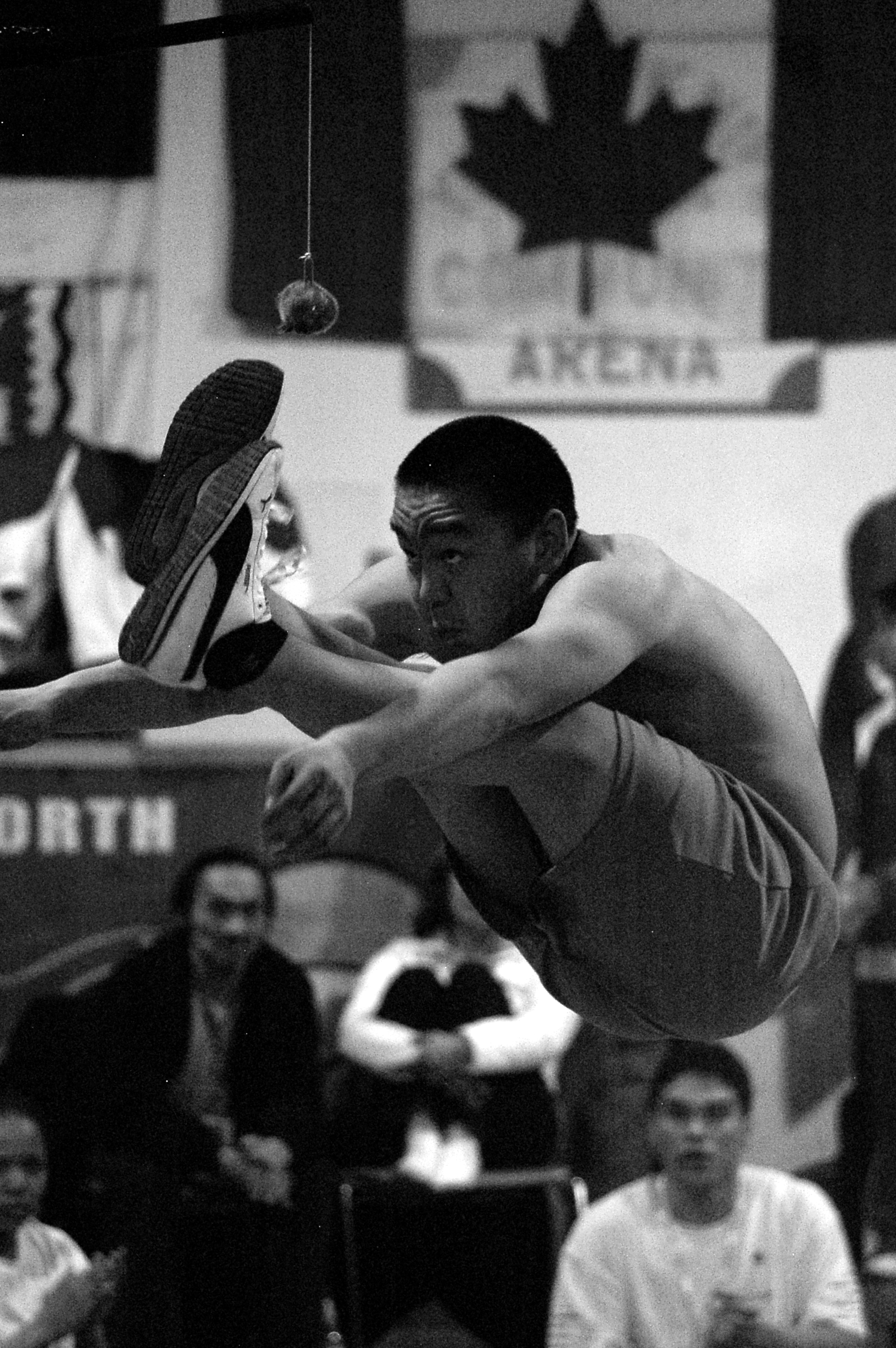
A two foot high kick being performed at the 2008 Arctic Winter Games.

Arctic sports or Inuit games (Iñupiaq: anaktaqtuat) refer to a number of sports disciplines popularly practiced in the Arctic, primarily by the indigenous peoples of the region, such as the Inuit. Arctic sports often refer to the sports of Yamal, Alaska, Greenland and parts of Canada, while sports of the First Nations are referred to as Dene games. Traditional Greenlandic sports are referred to as Kalaallit Pinnguaataat. Many of the sports and disciplines are largely athletic in nature, while others lean more towards martial arts or gymnastics.

Arctic sports are practiced on a semi-professional level locally around the Arctic, as well as in the Arctic Winter Games, World Eskimo Indian Olympics, and Native Youth Olympics (Alaska).

== History ==
Most sports originating from the Arctic have their roots in the hunting and fishing traditions of the indigenous peoples of the region. Hunting and fishing were an essential part of life in the Arctic, and training and practicing for the necessary skills was vital. As a result, many methods of training were developed to train strength, endurance and agility. Some Arctic sport disciplines originate from camp life and general recreation, having served as entertainment for the tribe. Many of these traditional training methods and recreational activities have become sports disciplines practiced widely around the region, and in places even outside the region. Throughout history, the disciplines were mainly practiced in friendly competitions between tribes and communities. With the introduction of the World Eskimo Indian Olympics in 1961 and the Arctic Winter Games in 1970, the sport disciplines went from being played on a recreational level to a higher and more professional level.

== Disciplines ==
=== One foot high kick ===
The one foot high kick discipline has its origins in Inuit hunting, where the high kick was used to signal a successful hunt over larger distances. In the one foot high kick, the athlete will jump with both feet and attempt to kick a suspended target with one foot, then land on that foot without losing balance. In competitions, the target will be raised after successful attempts, with the greatest height with a successful strike determining the winner.

The high kicks are disciplines in the Arctic Winter Games, where three attempts at each height is allowed. Athletes unable to strike the target after three attempts are eliminated from the contest. In the Arctic Winter Games, a running start is permitted.

The highest recorded one foot high kick is 2.92 meters (9 feet 7 inches), set by Stuart Towarak at the 2018 Arctic Winter Games.

=== Two foot high kick ===
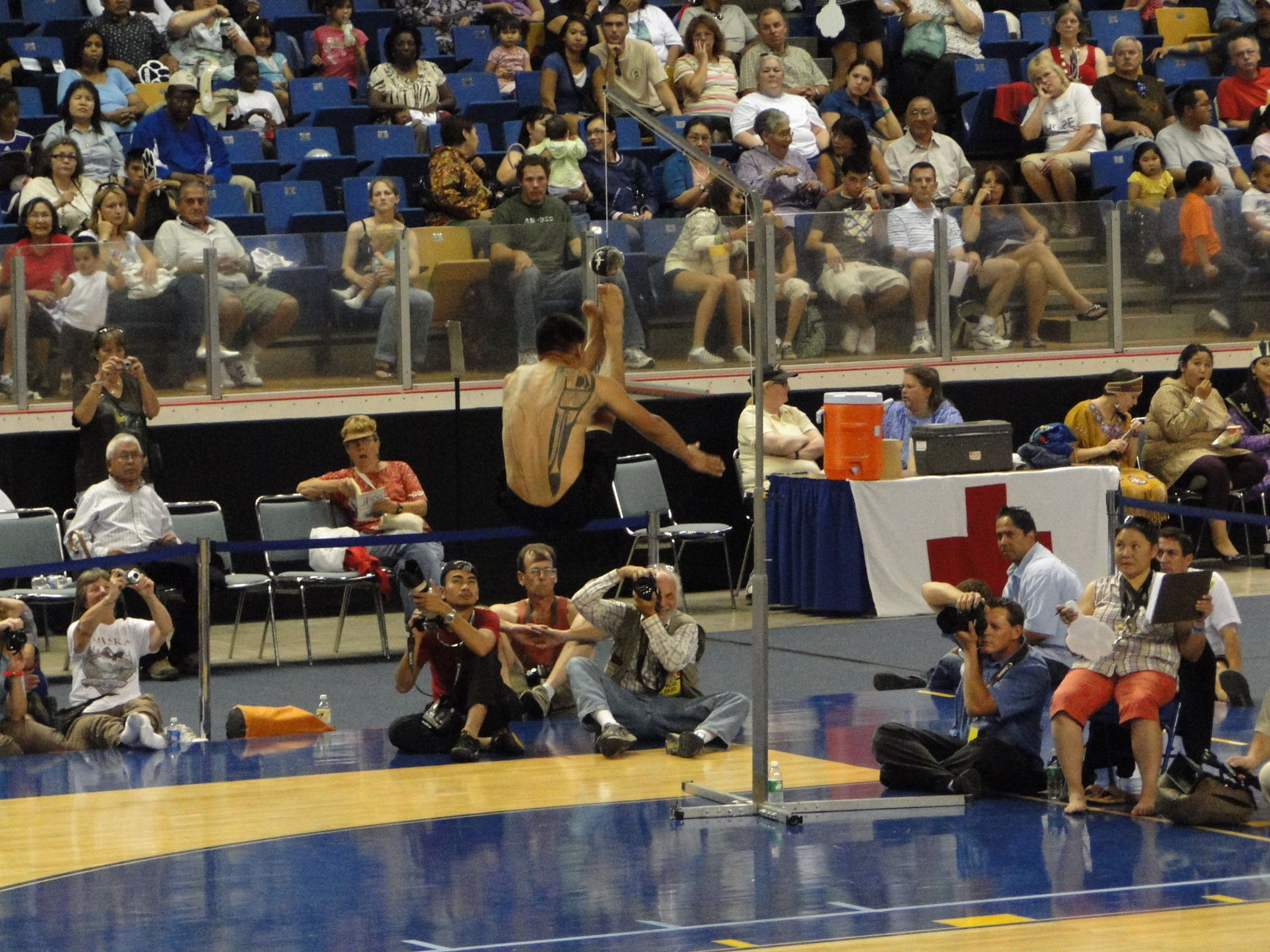
A two foot high kick being performed at the 2009 World Eskimo Indian Olympics

The two foot high kick discipline will have the athlete jump with both foot close together, and attempt to strike a suspended target with both feet. The athlete then has to land on both feet without losing balance.

The highest recorded two foot high kick was set at the 1988 Arctic Winter Games by Brian Randazzo. The recorded height was 2.64 meters (8 feet 8 inches).

=== Alaskan high kick ===
When performing the Alaskan high kick, the athlete sits on the floor, balancing on one foot and holding on to the other foot. Their free hand is placed on the floor and the athlete then jumps up, balancing on just their hand. The athlete attempts to hit a suspended target. The athlete will have to land on the kicking foot without losing balance.

The highest recorded Alaskan high kick is measured at 2.39 meters (7 feet 10 inches), set by Jesse Frankson at the 2002 Arctic Winter Games.

=== One hand reach ===
In one hand reach, the athlete balances on one hand, with their elbow tucked into their body. While balancing on their hand, the athlete reaches up to strike a suspended target. After making a successful strike, the striking hand must be the first part of the athlete's body to touch the ground.

The world record of one hand reach is held by Bernard Clark, reaching 1.78 meters (70 inches). The record was set at the 2015 World Eskimo Indian Olympics.

=== Toe kick ===
The toe kick discipline consists of an athlete jumping over a stick, then tapping that stick with their toes and land on both feet.

=== Kneel jump ===
The kneel jump's originates from Inuit hunting culture, though exact origins differ. Some mention the kneel jump as an escape, as hunters had to be able to swiftly escape predators or breaking ice while ice fishing, while others mention it as training in order to strengthen the legs to allow the hunters to jump between ice floes. When performing a kneel jump, the athlete begins on their knees with hands resting on their knees. From this kneeling position, the athlete jumps up and forward as far as possible, landing on their feet without losing balance. When landing, the feet must be within shoulder width apart.

The world record in kneel jump was recorded at the 2013 Native Youth Olympics, set by Dylan Magnusen with 1.72 meters (5 feet 7 inches).

=== Triple jump ===
The Arctic triple jump is a variant of the classic athletic triple jump discipline. In the Arctic triple jump, the athlete will jump forward as far as possible, with their feet within shoulder width apart. The athlete jumps two more times, with their feet remaining within shoulder width apart.

The longest recorded Arctic triple jump is 11.49 meters, set by Drew Bell at the 2016 Arctic Winter Games.

=== Scissor broad jump ===
The scissor broad jump is similar to the triple jump, though with the exception that the athlete will jump four times and the athlete will cross and uncross their legs after each jump. The jumps must be performed without losing balance.

The world record in scissor broad jump was set by Nick Hanson at the 2016 World Eskimo Indian Olympics. His distance was 11.4 meters (37 feet 5 inches).

=== Sledge jump ===
In the sledge jump, athletes consecutively jump over ten sledges, one at a time. After jumping over all ten sledges, the athlete has a brief rest period of 5-10 ten seconds, then turn around and repeat the process. The attempt continues until the athlete displaces or hits a sledge, at which point their attempt ends.

The record at sledge jump is 830 jumps, set by Rodin Roaldovich Taligin at the 2006 Arctic Winter Games.

=== Knuckle hop ===
For the knuckle hop, the athlete enters a pushup position on their fists and toes. The athlete then jumps forward in this position, remaining off the floor at all times.

The knuckle hop world record is held by Chris Stipdonk, marking 217 feet at the Arctic Winter Games in 2026.

=== Seal hop ===
The seal hop discipline is similar to the knuckle hop. The athlete will be in a pushup position on their palms and toes, then jump forward in the same fashion as in the knuckle hop. The discipline has its origins from hunting, where the hunter would perform seal hops to sneak up on seals.

The seal hop record is held by SigFurd Dock, with 57.3 meters (188 feet). The record was set at the 2015 Native Youth Olympics.

=== Airplane ===
The airplane discipline consists of the athlete lying on the floor face down, with arms outstretched. Three assistants lift the athlete and carry them forward. The athlete must remain in the outstretched position, their attempt ending if they fail to maintain the position. The discipline is also known as "drop the bomb".

In the Arctic Winter Games, the discipline was measured by distance until 2016 where it was changed to a timed event. The record for longest distance made in airplane was set by Makabe Nartok in the 1986 Arctic Winter Games, with 48.98 meters (160 feet 8.5 inches). The record for longest time is held by Tittu Wille, making it 46.69 seconds. That record was set at the 2016 Arctic Winter Games.

=== Arm pull ===
In arm pull, the athletes sit on the floor facing each other. Their arms are locked at the elbows and their left hands hold on to the right ankle of their opponent. Their left leg is straight and their right leg is locked over the opponent's left leg, locking the two athletes together. The athletes pull at the elbow in an attempt to pull the opponent enough for them to fall over, or to touch the opponent's hand to one's chest.

=== Head pull ===
For head pull, the athletes lie on the floor facing each other. A soft leather belt is placed over the back of each athlete's head. The athletes enter a pushup position and then begin pulling with their heads, attempting to pull their opponent across a line on the ground.

=== Ear pull ===
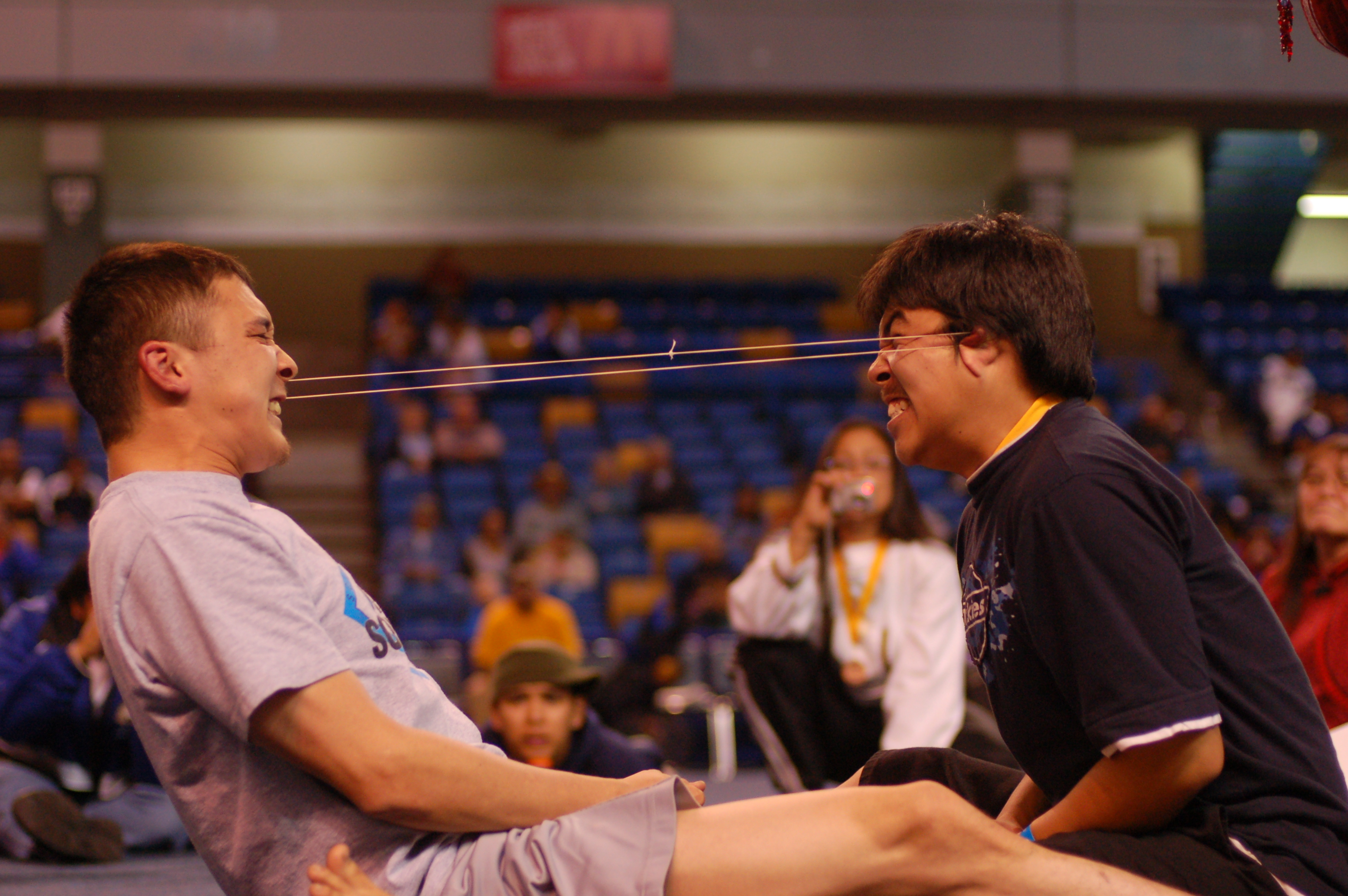
Ear pull being performed at the 2008 World Eskimo Indian Olympics.

For ear pull, the athletes sit on the floor facing each other. A looped string of sinew is looped around each athlete's ear. The athletes pull straight back, attempting to pull the string of sinew off their opponent's ear.

=== Finger pull ===
For finger pull, the athletes lock their middle fingers together, attempting to pull the opponent's arm forward or to break the opponent's finger lock. The discipline originates from fishing culture, where strong fingers were needed to carry many fish, as fish were often carried by hooking the fingers through the fishes gills. The finger pull was an effective exercise to strengthen the fingers.

=== Dene stick pull ===
Dene (or Indian) stick pull is a traditional Dene sport. The discipline consists of two athletes holding onto a stick, fully covered in grease, at the center and then attempt to pull the stick from the opponent. Like many other Arctic sports, it has its origins in ice fishing. The greasy stick tests the athlete's grip, and is similar to holding a fish by its tail. While not ice fishing, Dene fisherman would practice stick pull to practice their grip and become better at holding on to caught fish. It would also let them practice catching fish bare handed. Bear grease was traditionally used for stick pull, but in today's high-level competitions normal all-purpose grease is used.

=== Inuit stick pull ===
The Inuit stick pull (or Eskimo stick pull) is similar to the Dene (or Indian) stick pull, except that the stick will not be greased and the athletes will be holding onto the sticks with both hands. One athlete will hold onto the center of the stick, with the other holding on to the sides of the stick. The goal is to pull the opponent over or to get the opponent to lose their grip on the stick.

=== Snow snake ===
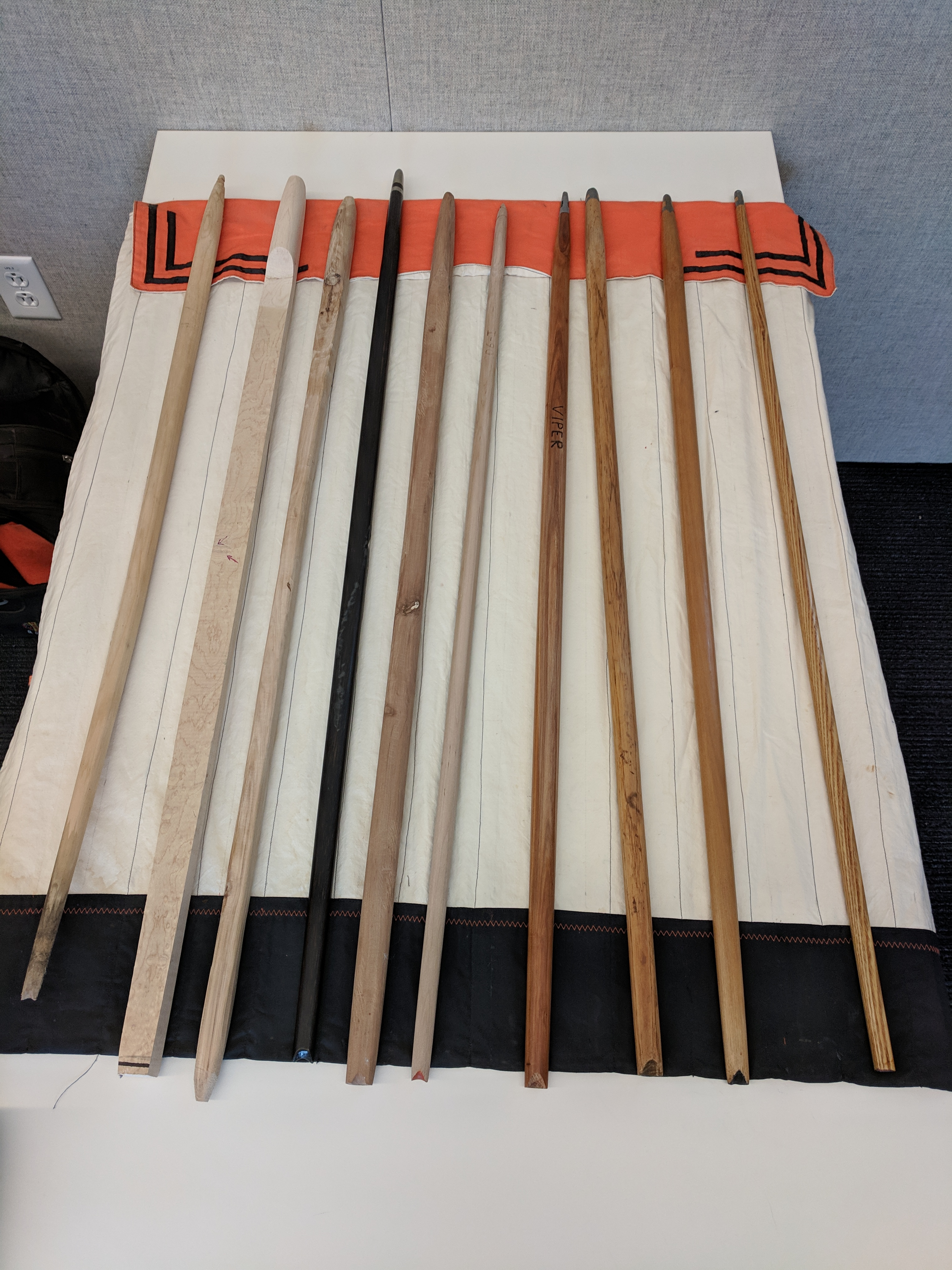
Snow snakes, used in the snow snake discipline.

The snow snake (occasionally spelled as one word, "snowsnake") discipline originates from the Iroquois and Dene. In this discipline, the athlete throws a carved stick along a set route. Like many other Arctic and Dene sports, the snow snake discipline has its origins in hunting. Throwing the snow snake reminds of hunting caribous, seal and ptarmigan, as the hunters had to sneak up on their prey and throw their spear or snow snake from great distances with great accuracy.

The longest recorded distance set at a snow snake game was set at the 2008 Arctic Winter Games by Sandy Annanack, with 159.89 meters (524 feet 7 inches).

=== Pole push ===
Pole push is a tug-of-war discipline, in that the athletes in teams hold on to a pole and attempt to push the opposing team across a set mark. The discipline has its origins in general Arctic indigenous camp life, serving as a strength training and general entertainment. The discipline is known from the Dene, where it would act as strength training to prepare them for carrying wooden canoes over great distances.

=== Hand games ===
In the hand games two teams kneel on the floor, facing each other. The teams take turns being the active team, with the active team having to hide tokens in their hands, while their hands are hidden under a blanket. Traditionally drummers and singers play music while the hiding of the tokens are happening. After the tokens have been hidden, the opposing team have to guess in which hands the tokens are hidden.

=== Wrist carry ===
For the wrist carry, an athlete will hook one wrist over the center of a pole. The pole is then carried by two assistants. The athlete must remain suspended while being carried through a set route.

=== Four man carry ===
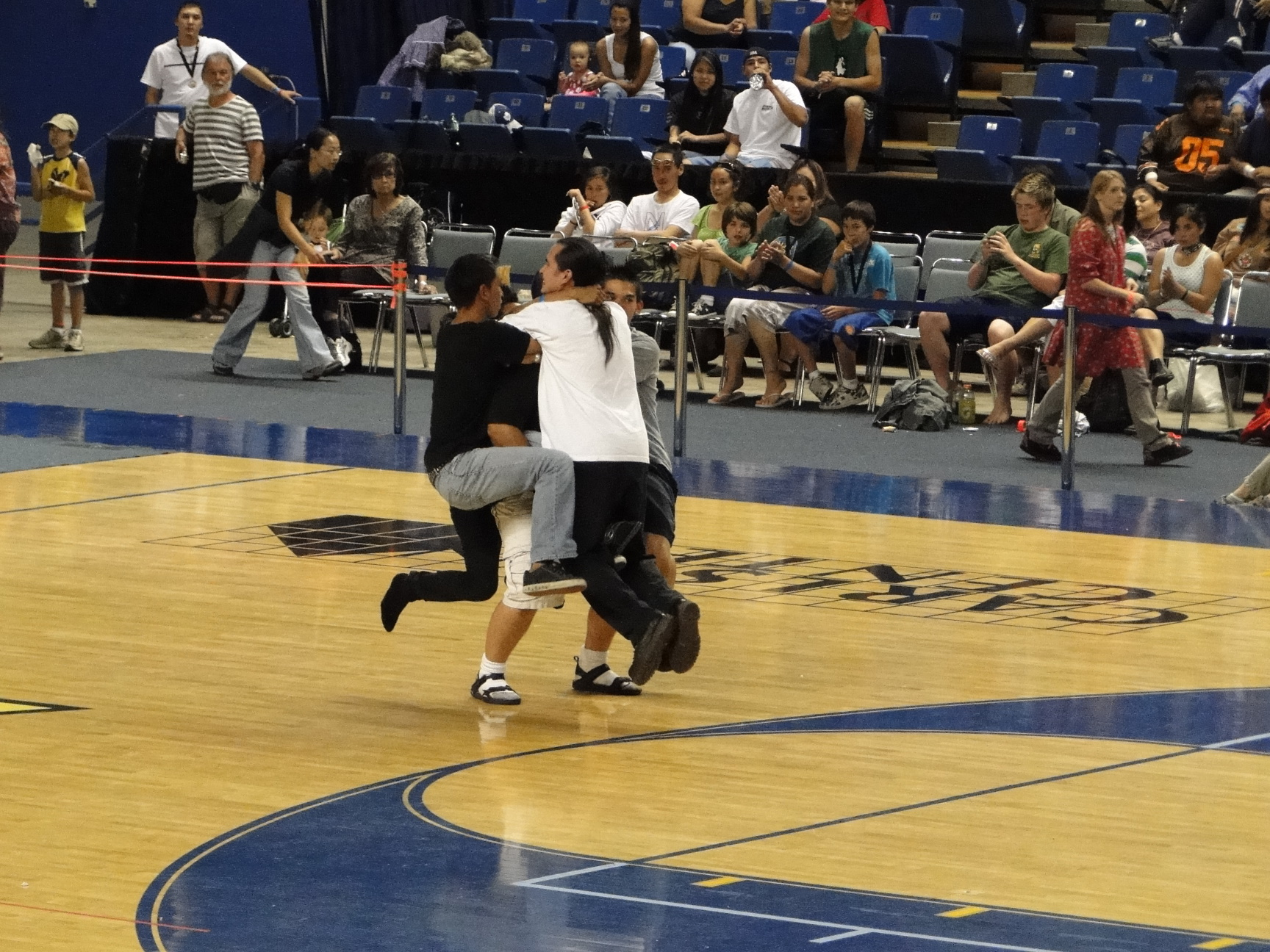
Four man carry being performed at the 2009 World Eskimo Indian Olympics.

The four man carry has its roots in hunting culture, serving as training for carrying large animals after a hunt. The discipline has the athlete carry four volunteers for the greatest possible distance.

=== Ear weight ===
The ear weight discipline consists of athletes attaching loops of twine around one ear, with a lead weight attached to the other end of the twine. The athlete then attempts to move as far as possible along a set route, with their attempt ending when the weight drops or when a judge finds the athlete to not be lifting correctly. Historically the discipline was a way to train enduring the pain from frostbites, with sacks of flour used before lead weights.

=== Greased pole walk ===
Greased pole walk consists of athletes walking across a greasy pole, with the objective being to make it the farthest distance down the pole. The discipline has its history in scavenging, where it was necessary for the scavengers to have good balance to be able to make it across slippery logs over creeks and rivers.

=== Bench reach ===
For the bench reach, the athlete kneels at the edge of a bench. The athlete leans forward, with an assistant sitting on the back of the athlete's lower legs to keep them in place. The athlete will then lean forward and attempt to place an object as far away as possible.

=== Blanket toss ===
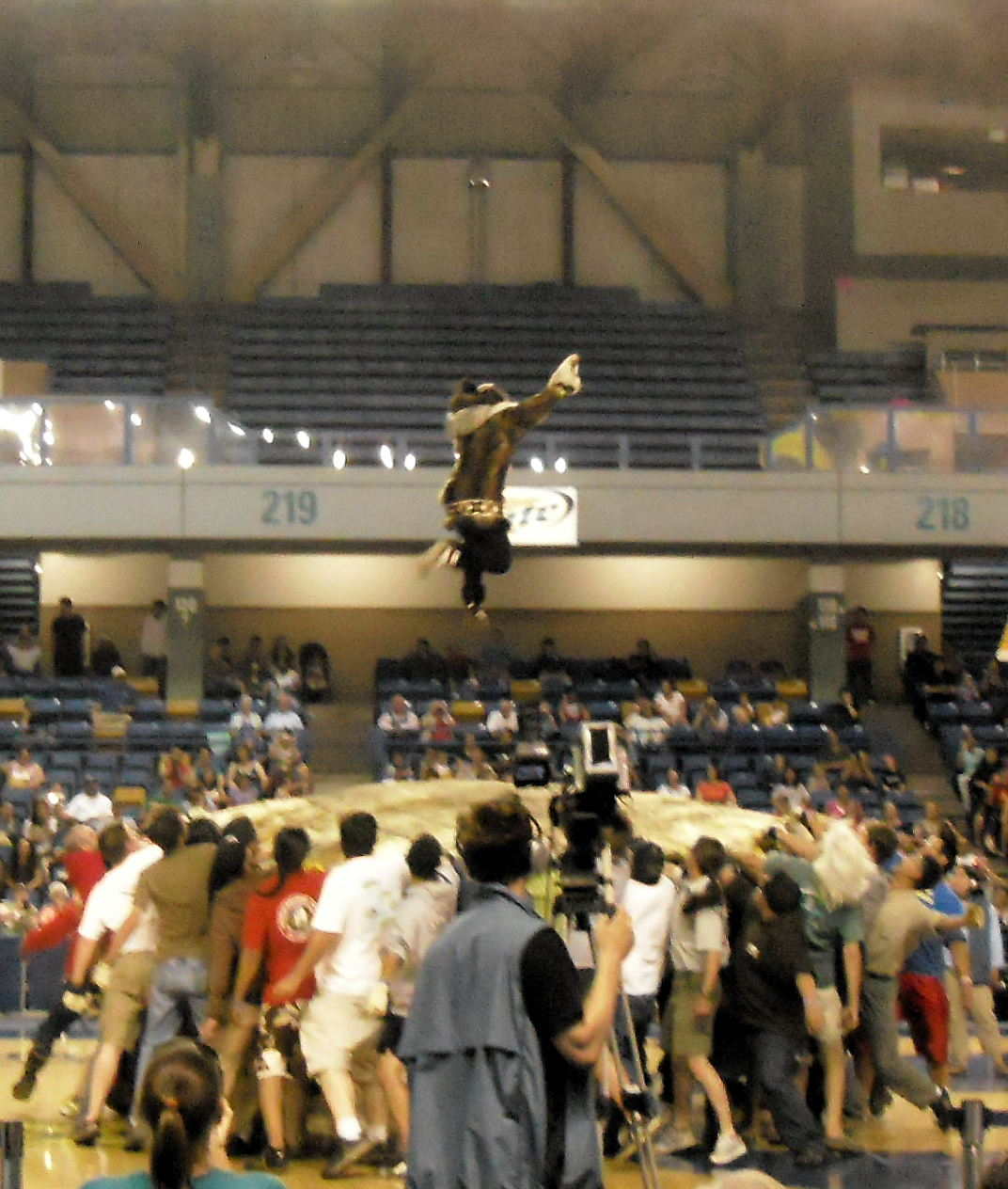
A blanket toss at the 2011 World Eskimo Indian Olympics.

The blanket toss, also known as Nalukataq, is a trampolining discipline. The trampoline is made up of walrus hide or a seal skin blanket, held by 40 to 50 volunteers. The objective of the blanket toss discipline is to get as high as possible, while also managing balance and style in the air. The blanket toss originates from the Nalukataq celebration, where it has historically been a significant event of the celebrations.

=== Other ===
In the World Eskimo Indian Olympics there are a number of disciplines around traditional camp life. Those include fish cutting, seal skinning and maktak eating, where the competitors attempt to perform the task as quickly as possible.

Back bend is a discipline not practiced by any major Arctic sport event, though it was previously an event at the Arctic Winter Games. It consisted of the athlete leaning backwards on a wooden pole, attempting to bend back as far as possible.

== Competitions ==
=== Arctic Winter Games ===
The first Arctic Winter Games was held in 1970, but without medal-giving events in any Arctic sports. Arctic sports was a demonstration sport, however, as was it in the following edition in 1972. At the 1974 Arctic Winter Games Arctic sports were officially added to the sports program, with a total of six disciplines: kneel jump, two foot high kick, one foot high kick, one hand reach, back bend and rope gymnastics. Since 1974 Arctic sports has been a part of every edition of the Arctic Winter Games, having expanded over the years. In modern editions of the games, 11 disciplines (and one all around competition) are held in Arctic Sports, for a total of 35 medal-giving events in Arctic sports.

Dene games is also a sport in modern Arctic Winter Games. It was first added to the games' program in the 1990 Arctic Winter Games, being categorised together with Arctic sports as "Arctic sports and Dene games". The Dene games added sports disciplines such as stick pull and hand games. In 1998 Dene games became a separate sport and has featured in all editions of the games since.

Arctic sports held at modern Arctic Winter Games are one foot high kick, two foot high kick, Alaskan high kick, kneel jump, airplane, one hand reach, head pull, knuckle hop, sledge jump, triple jump and arm pull. Dene games held are finger pull, hand games, snow snake, stick pull and pole push.

=== World Eskimo Indian Olympics ===
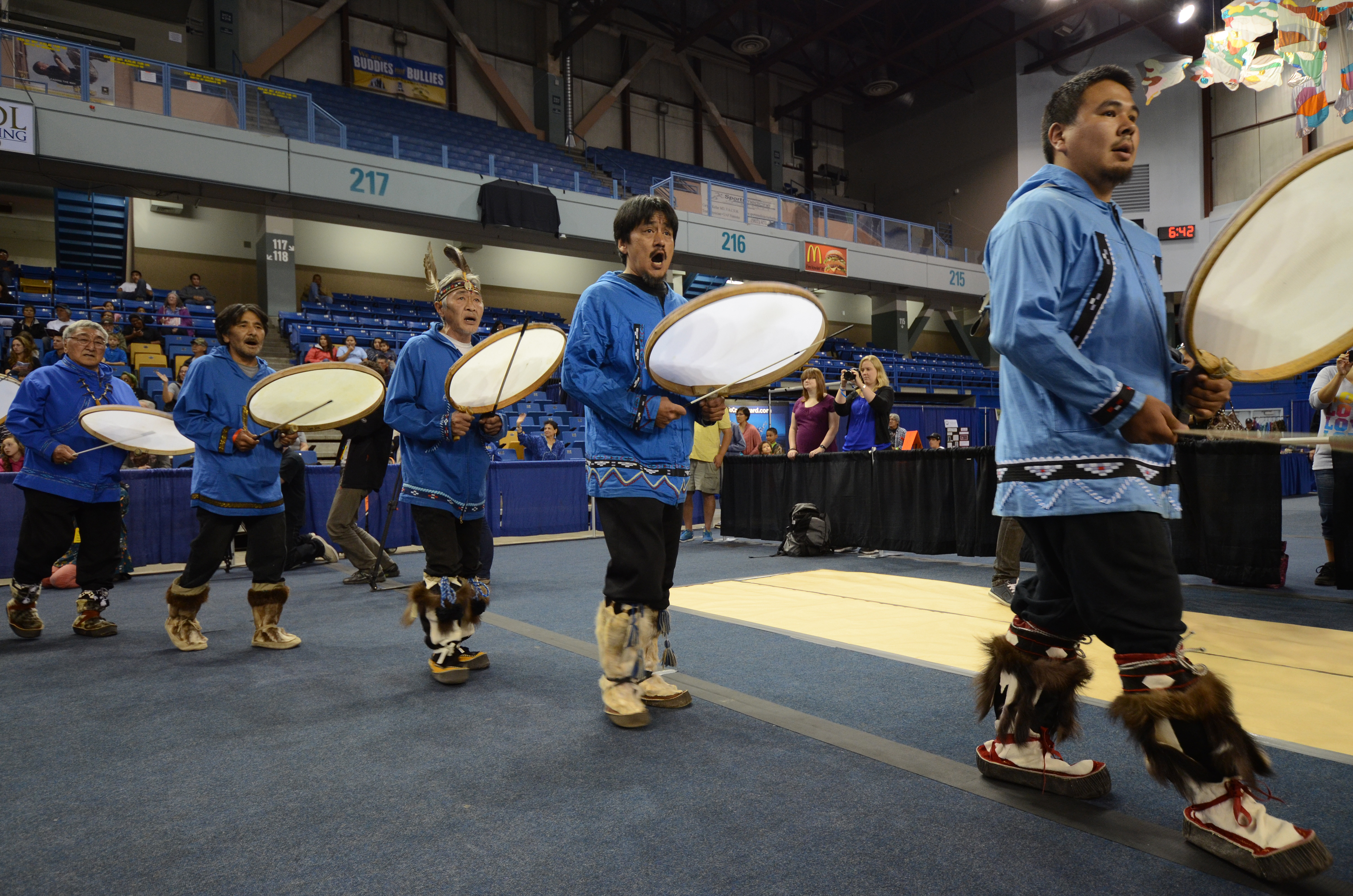
Opening ceremonies at the 2014 World Eskimo Indian Olympics.

The World Eskimo Indian Olympics feature solely Arctic and indigenous sports. The first edition of the games were held in Fairbanks in 1961, featuring just three sports disciplines (high kick, blanket toss and seal skinning), as well as cultural events. Modern editions of the games feature around twenty disciplines. The games were originally called World Eskimo Olympics, but was changed to its current name in 1973, to more correctly reflect the ethnicity of the participants of the games.

=== Nunatsinni Unammersuarneq ===
Nunatsinni Unammersuarneq is the Greenlandic championships in Arctic sports, organized by Arctic Sports Greenland. The competition generally receive broad coverage in Greenland, with KNR broadcasting the events live. Disciplines held at the Nunatsinni Unammersuarneq include the three high kick disciplines (Alaskan, two foot and one foot), kneel jump, triple jump, one hand reach and the traditional Greenlandic high kick discipline known as "angakkuusaarneq".

=== Native Youth Olympics ===
The Native Youth Olympics (also known as the NYO Games) began in 1972 and is a local contest in Arctic and indigenous sports, set in Alaska.
