= 2008 Arctic Winter Games =

Multi-sports competition

- Host city: Yellowknife, Northwest Territories, Canada
- Nations: 7 countries: Canada; Denmark; Finland; Norway; Russia; Sweden; United States
- Teams: 9 territories: Alaska; Greenland; Northern Alberta; Northwest Territories; (Quebec) Nunavik Québec; Nunavut; Sápmi; Yamal-Nenets; Yukon
- Athletes: approx. 2000
- Opening: 9 March 2008
- Closing: 15 March 2008
- Website: www.awg2008.ca

Approximately 2,000 athletes, coaches, team staff and officials participated in the 2008 Arctic Winter Games in Yellowknife, Northwest Territories in Canada, celebrating the 20th event. The 2008 games took place from March 9 through March 15. Events were held in and around the city of Yellowknife. This was the fourth time Yellowknife had hosted the games, and the fifth time overall in the Northwest Territories.

== Participants ==
- Alaska
- Greenland
- Northwest Territories (host contingent)
- Nunavik Quebec (traditionally defined Northern Inuit region of the Nord-du-Québec administrative region in Quebec)
- Nunavut
- Northern Alberta
- Russia (because only the Yamalo-Nenets Autonomous Okrug participated they were referred to as team Russia, competing under the Russian flag)
- Sami (Sami peoples of Norway, Sweden, and Finland collectively)
- Yukon Territory

The 2010 Games was held in Grande Prairie, Alberta.

== Events ==
Competition was held in alpine skiing, badminton, basketball, biathlon, cross-country skiing, curling, Dene games (see Dene), dog mushing, figure skating, gymnastics, ice hockey, indoor soccer, Inuit Games (see Inuit), short track speed skating, snowboarding, snowshoe biathlon, snowshoeing (see Snowshoe), speed skating, table tennis, volleyball, and wrestling.

== Medal tally ==
(Unofficially listed with number of gold medals taking priority followed by silvers.)

| Team | Gold | Silver | Bronze | Overall |
|---|---|---|---|---|
| Alaska | 74 | 55 | 73 | 202 |
| Yamal-Nenets | 44 | 32 | 16 | 92 |
| Northwest Territories | 34 | 41 | 36 | 111 |
| Alberta North | 29 | 37 | 24 | 90 |
| Yukon | 26 | 25 | 30 | 81 |
| Nunavut | 15 | 27 | 25 | 67 |
| Greenland | 12 | 14 | 18 | 44 |
| Nunavik Quebec | 9 | 7 | 8 | 24 |
| (Sápmi) Saami | 5 | 5 | 6 | 16 |
