= Arctic Winter Games =

Multi-sport competition

- Arctic Winter Games Logo
- Purpose: Sports for the Arctic
- Frequency: Every 3 years (beginning 2029), biennial till 2026
- Inaugurated: 1970 in Yellowknife, Northwest Territories, Canada
- Most recent: 2026 Arctic Winter Games held in Whitehorse, Yukon, Canada
- President: John Rodda
- Website: arcticwintergames.org

The Arctic Winter Games are a triennial multi-sport and indigenous cultural event involving circumpolar peoples residing in communities or countries bordering the Arctic Ocean, which were biennial up to the 2026 games edition held in Whitehorse, Yukon, Canada.

== History ==
The Arctic Winter Games were founded in 1969 under the leadership of Alaska Governor Walter J. Hickel, Stuart (Stu) M. Hodgson, Commissioner of the Northwest Territories, and James Smith, Commissioner of Yukon. The idea to "provide a forum where athletes from the circumpolar North could compete on their own terms, on their own turf" came from Cal Miller, an advisor with the Yukon team at the 1967 Canada Winter Games.

In 1970 in Yellowknife, Canada, 500 athletes, trainers and officials came together for the first Arctic Winter Games. The participants came from the Northwest Territories, Yukon, and Alaska. Participants now come from Alaska, Northern Alberta, Yukon, Nunavut, Nunavik, Northwest Territories, Greenland, Finland and Norway. The games in 2002 were the first jointly hosted Arctic Winter Games, by Nuuk, Greenland, and Iqaluit, Nunavut. During the 2023 games, Prince William held a video conference with nine participants.

The most recent Arctic Winter Games took place in Whitehorse, Yukon, Canada, from 8–15 March 2026.

== Nations ==
As of 2026, eight contingents make up the Arctic Winter Games including:

1. Canada - five regions ( Alberta North, Northwest Territories, (Quebec) Nunavik, Nunavut and Yukon)
2. United States - one region ( Alaska)
3. Greenland - (Team Kalaallit Nunaat)
4. Sápmi - the region stretches over four countries: Norway, Sweden, Finland, and Russia
5. France - one territory ( Saint Pierre and Miquelon) *upcoming debut in 2029 AWG

== Contingents ==
Since 2023, the same eight contingents have participated in the Arctic Winter Games. Another five contingents have taken part in the games throughout the games' history: Russia, Magadan, Tyumen, Chukotka and Yamal. In the table below is an overview of each contingent's appearances throughout the games. Prior to the 2000 Arctic Winter Games Nunavut was part of the Northwest Territories. After division in 1999, Nunavut competed as separate contingent.

Contingent	Year																											
Contingent	70	72	74	76	78	80	82	84	86	88	90	92	94	96	98	00	02	04	06	08	10	12	14	16	18	23	24	26
Alaska	X	X	X	X	X	X	X	X	X	X	X	X	X	X	X	X	X	X	X	X	X	X	X	X	X	X	X	X
Northwest Territories	X	X	X	X	X	X	X	X	X	X	X	X	X	X	X	X	X	X	X	X	X	X	X	X	X	X	X	X
Yukon	X	X	X	X	X	X	X	X	X	X	X	X	X	X	X	X	X	X	X	X	X	X	X	X	X	X	X	X
(Quebec) Nunavik	—	X	X	X	—	—	—	—	X	—	—	—	—	—	—	X	X	X	X	X	X	X	X	X	X	X	X	X
Alberta North	—	—	—	—	—	—	—	—	X	X	X	X	X	X	X	X	X	X	X	X	X	X	X	X	X	X	X	X
Greenland	—	—	—	—	—	—	—	—	—	—	X	X	X	X	X	X	X	X	X	X	X	X	X	X	X	X	X	X
Finland	—	—	—	—	—	—	—	—	—	—	—	—	—	—														
Russia	—	—	—	—	—	—	—	—	—	—	—	X	—	—	—	—	—	—	—	—	—	—	—	—	—	—	—	—
(Magadan Oblast) Magadan	—	—	—	—	—	—	—	—	—	—	—	—	X	X	X	X	X	X	—	—	—	—	—	—	—	—	—	—
(Tyumen Oblast) Tyumen	—	—	—	—	—	—	—	—	—	—	—	—	X	X	X	—	—	—	—	—	—	—	—	—	—	—	—	—
(Chukotka Autonomous Okrug) Chukotka	—	—	—	—	—	—	—	—	—	—	—	—	—	—	—	X	X	—	—	—	—	—	—	—	—	—	—	—
Nunavut	—	—	—	—	—	—	—	—	—	—	—	—	—	—	—	X	X	X	X	X	X	X	X	X	X	X	X	X
Sápmi	—	—	—	—	—	—	—	—	—	—	—	—	—	—	—	—	—	X	X	X	X	X	X	X	X	X	X	X
(Yamalo-Nenets Autonomous Okrug) Yamal	—	—	—	—	—	—	—	—	—	—	—	—	—	—	—	—	—	X	X	X	X	X	X	X	X	—	—	—

== Editions ==
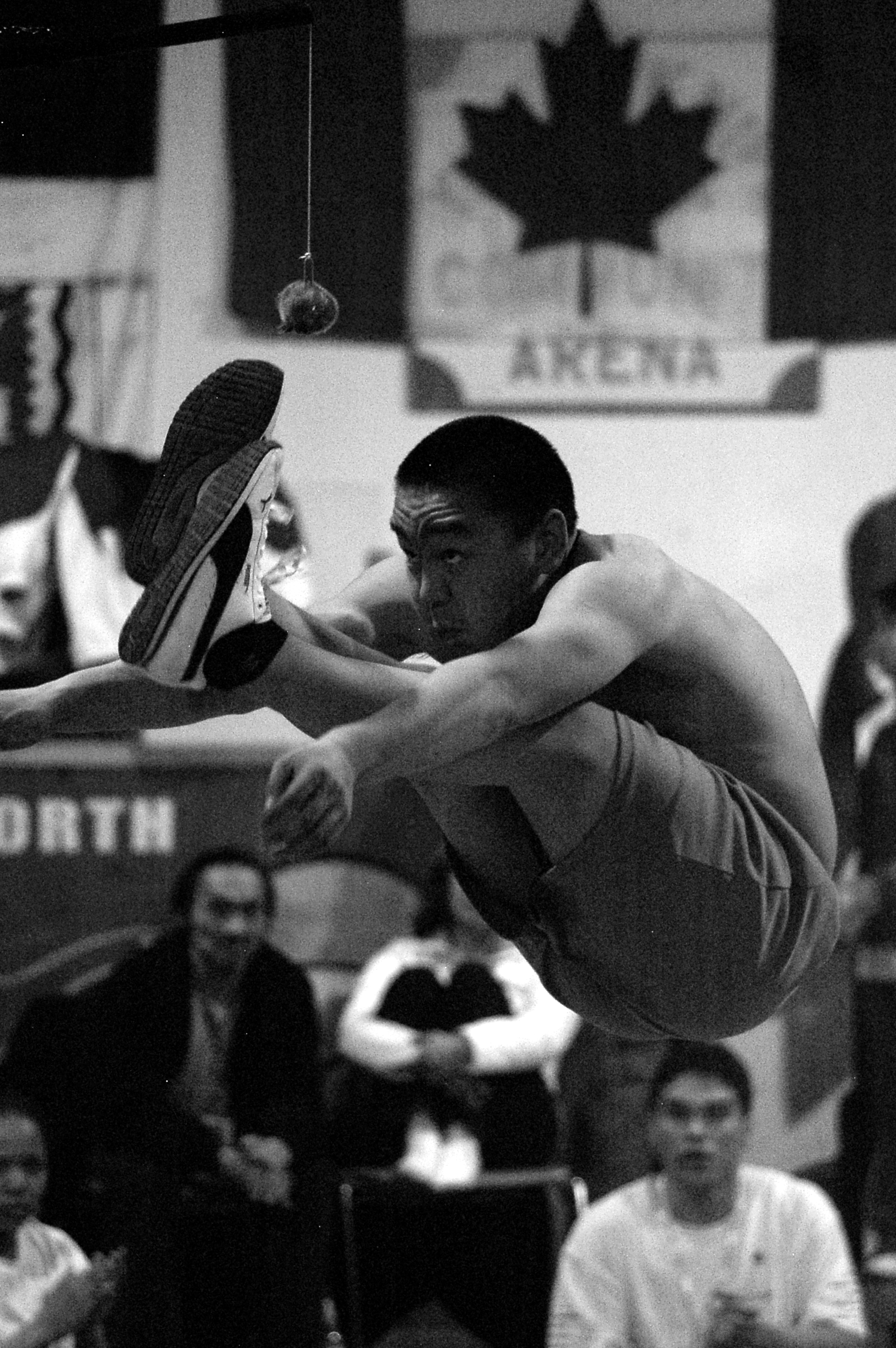
An athlete performing a two-foot high kick at the 2008 Arctic Winter Games

Host cities have been in Canada, the United States, and Greenland.

The Arctic Circle, currently at roughly 66° north of the Equator, defines the boundary of the Arctic seas and lands

A political map showing land ownership within the Arctic region

#	Year	Host city	Host country
1	1970	Yellowknife	Canada
2	1972	Whitehorse	Canada
3	1974	Anchorage	United States
4	1976	Schefferville	Canada
5	1978	Hay River / Pine Point	Canada
6	1980	Whitehorse	Canada
7	1982	Fairbanks	United States
8	1984	Yellowknife	Canada
9	1986	Whitehorse	Canada
10	1988	Fairbanks	United States
11	1990	Yellowknife	Canada
12	1992	Whitehorse	Canada
13	1994	Slave Lake	Canada
14	1996	Chugiak / Eagle River	United States
15	1998	Yellowknife	Canada
16	2000	Whitehorse	Canada
17	2002	Nuuk and Iqaluit	Greenland and Canada
18	2004	Fort McMurray Wood Buffalo	Canada
19	2006	Kenai Peninsula Borough	United States
20	2008	Yellowknife	Canada
21	2010	Grande Prairie	Canada
22	2012	Whitehorse	Canada
23	2014	Fairbanks	United States
24	2016	Nuuk	Greenland
25	2018	Hay River / Fort Smith	Canada
-	2020	Whitehorse (cancelled)	Canada
26	2023	Fort McMurray Wood Buffalo	Canada
27	2024	Matanuska-Susitna Borough	United States
28	2026	Whitehorse (Note: Originally to be hosted by Yamal-Nenets, Russia, but withdrawn by committee due to war against Ukraine. Yellowknife declined to host the games that year and Whitehorse stepped in.)	Canada
29	2028	Fairbanks	United States

== Hodgson Trophy ==
The Hodgson trophy for fair play and team spirit is awarded at the end of every games. The trophy is named for Stuart (Stu) Milton Hodgson, former Commissioner of the Northwest Territories.

The past winners of the trophy are:

Year(s)	Winner
1978	Yukon
1980	Yukon
1982	Yukon
1984	Yukon
1986	Yukon
1988	Yukon
1990	Alaska
1992	Northwest Territories
1994	Greenland
1996	Northwest Territories
1998	Yukon
2000	Nunavut
2002	Greenland
2004	Nunavut
2006	Alaska
2008	Nunavut
2010	Alaska
2012	Nunavut
2014	Greenland
2016	Alaska
2018	Alaska
2020	AWG2020 host society volunteers and staff
2023	Greenland
2024	Yukon
2026	Alberta North and Nunavut (tie)

== Arctic Winter Games International Committee ==
The Arctic Winter Games International Committee consists of the following people

- John Rodda - Alaska, president
- Leigh Goldie - Alberta, vice president
- John Flynn - Yukon, past president
- Kyle Seely - Nunavut, director
- Karl Davidsen - Greenland, director
- John Estle - Alaska, joint interim - technical director
- Alison Brown - Northwest Territories, joint interim - technical director
- Marie Cairns - Yukon, director
- Mariele dePeuter - Nunavut, director
- Guy Yango - Nunavik, director
- Don Wilson - Alberta, Treasurer
- Jane Arychuk - Northwest Territories, director
- Moira Lassen - Yukon, executive director (ex-officio)

== Sports disciplines ==
A total of 29 sports have been represented at the Arctic Winter Games with arctic sports, badminton, cross country skiing, ice hockey and volleyball being the only sports to be featured in all editions of the Arctic Winter Games.

The table below shows the sports and the years in which they have been a part of the Arctic Winter Games programme.

Sport	Year																											
Sport	70	72	74	76	78	80	82	84	86	88	90	92	94	96	98	00	02	04	06	08	10	12	14	16	18	23	24	26
Alpine skiing	—	X	—	—	—	—	—	—	—	—	—	—	X	X	—	X	X	X	X	—	13	13	13	13	—	X	X	X
Archery	—	—	X	—	—	—	—	—	—	—	—	—	—	—	—	—	—	—	—	—	—	—	—	—	—	X	X	X
Arctic sports	d	d	X	X	X	X	X	X	X	X	X	X	X	X	X	X	X	X	X	35	35	35	35	35	35	X	X	X
Badminton	X	X	X	X	X	X	X	X	X	X	X	X	X	X	X	13	X	10	10	10	10	10	10	10	10	10	X	X
Basketball	X	X	X	X	X	X	X	—	X	X	X	X	X	X	X	X	X	X	X	2	2	2	2	2	2	X	X	X
Biathlon	—	—	X	—	—	—	—	—	X	X	X	X	X	X	X	X	—	X	X	14	14	14	14	14	14	X	X	X
Boxing	X	—	X	—	—	—	—	—	—	—	—	—	—	—	—	—	—	—	—	—	—	—	—	—	—	—	—	—
Broomball	—	—	—	—	—	—	—	—	—	X	—	—	—	—	—	—	—	—	—	—	—	—	—	—	—	—	—	—
Cross-country skiing	X	X	X	X	X	X	X	X	X	X	X	X	X	X	X	X	X	X	X	24	24	24	24	24	24	X	X	X
Curling	X	X	X	X	X	X	X	X	X	X	X	X	X	X	X	X	X	X	X	2	2	2	3	—	2	X	X	X
Dene games	—	—	—	—	—	—	—	—	—	—	X	X	X	X	X	X	X	X	X	24	24	24	24	24	24	X	X	X
Dog mushing	—	—	—	—	—	—	—	—	—	—	X	X	X	X	X	X	X	X	X	6	6	6	6	—	6	—	—	—
Figure skating	X	X	X	X	X	X	X	X	X	X	X	X	X	X	X	X	—	X	X	13	13	13	13	—	13	X	X	X
Freestyle skiing	—	—	—	—	—	—	—	—	—	—	—	—	—	—	—	—	—	—	—	—	8	—	—	—	—	—	—	—
Futsal	—	—	—	—	—	—	—	—	—	—	—	—	—	—	—	—	—	—	—	—	—	—	—	5	5	X	X	X
Gymnastics	—	—	X	—	—	—	X	—	X	X	X	X	X	X	X	X	X	X	X	6	6	6	6	—	6	X	X	X
Ice hockey	X	X	X	X	X	X	X	X	X	X	X	X	X	X	X	X	X	X	X	3	3	3	3	2	3	X	X	X
Indoor soccer	—	—	—	—	—	X	X	X	X	X	X	X	X	X	X	X	X	X	X	5	5	5	5	—	—	—	—	—
Judo	—	X	X	X	X	X	X	—	—	—	—	—	—	—	—	—	—	—	—	—	—	—	—	—	—	—	—	—
Shooting	X	X	X	X	X	X	X	X	X	X	X	X	X	X	X	—	—	—	—	—	—	—	—	—	—	—	—	—
Short-track speed skating	—	—	—	—	—	—	—	X	X	X	—	—	X	X	X	X	X	X	X	20	20	20	20	—	20	X	X	X
Snowboarding	—	—	—	—	—	—	—	—	—	—	—	—	—	—	—	X	X	X	X	20	20	20	20	16	20	X	X	X
Snowshoe biathlon	—	—	—	—	X	X	X	X	X	X	X	X	X	X	—	X	—	X	X	14	14	14	14	14	14	X	X	X
Snowshoeing	—	—	X	X	X	X	X	X	X	X	X	X	X	X	X	X	X	X	X	14	14	14	14	14	14	X	X	X
Swimming	—	—	d	—	—	—	—	—	—	—	—	—	—	—	—	—	—	—	—	—	—	—	—	—	—	—	—	—
Table tennis	X	X	X	X	X	X	X	—	—	—	—	—	X	X	X	—	X	X	X	14	14	12	12	12	12	X	X	X
Volleyball	X	X	X	X	X	X	X	X	X	X	X	X	X	X	X	X	X	X	X	2	2	2	2	2	2	X	X	X
Winter triathlon	—	—	—	—	—	—	—	X	X	X	X	—	—	—	—	—	—	—	—	—	—	—	—	—	—	—	—	—
Wrestling	—	X	X	X	X	X	—	—	—	—	X	X	X	X	X	X	X	X	X	25	25	25	25	26	25	X	X	X

X = The sport was featured in this Arctic Winter Games.
12 = The sport was featured in this Arctic Winter Games. The number indicates the amount of medal-giving events in that sport.
d = Demonstration sport with no medal-giving events.
P = The sport is planned to be a part of an upcoming edition of the Arctic Winter Games.
— = The sport did not feature in this edition of the Arctic Winter Games.

== Arctic Winter Games alumni ==
- The Governor General of Canada, Michaëlle Jean, presented Aisa Pirti, a 19-year-old Inuk from Akulivik, Nunavik, with the National Aboriginal Role Model Award during a ceremony at Rideau Hall. Aisa has received 30 medals and five trophies for Inuit games in regional and circumpolar competitions, such as the Arctic Winter Games and the Eastern Arctic Summer Games.

== See also ==
- World Eskimo Indian Olympics
- Nalukataq (traditional blanket toss celebrations)
- World Indigenous Games
- Traditional sports and games
