= Danny Boyle's unrealized projects =

During his long career, British director Danny Boyle has worked on several projects which never progressed beyond the pre-production stage under his direction. Some of these projects fell in development hell, were officially canceled, were in development limbo or would see life under a different production team.

== 2000s ==
=== Tick Tock ===
On March 14, 2001, Boyle was set to direct Anthony Bagarozzi and Charles Mondry’s screenplay Tick Tock, an action suspense thriller about an amnesiac being a prime suspect in a bombing investigation, with Gavin Polone producing the film that was expected to start filming that fall, and Columbia Pictures handling the film's distribution. The movie was canceled due to the September 11 attacks.

=== Texas Killing Fields ===
On January 20, 2003, Boyle was going to direct a movie about the Texas Killing Fields with Michael Mann's company Forward Pass producing the film. On February 27, 2009, Boyle revealed that he passed on directing, leading to Ami Canaan Mann to direct the film.

=== Solomom Grundy ===
On January 20, 2003, Boyle was going to direct a feature film adaptation of Dan Gooch's novel Solomon Grundy with Robert Nelson Jacobs writing the screenplay, Miramax producing the film and interested in casting Adam Sandler. On November 17, 2008, Boyle revealed that he cancelled it because of similarities to David Fincher’s feature film adaptation, the adaptation of F. Scott Fitzgerald’s short story The Curious Case of Benjamin Button.

=== Ponte Tower ===
On February 28, 2007, Boyle was offered to direct Michael Thomas' screenplay Ponte Tower, an Apartheid thriller set primarily in Ponte City, with Boyle, Thomas, Gina Carter, and Frank Kunster producing the film, U.K. Film Council's Development Fund financing and South Africa-based Moonlighting Films producing. On February 27, 2009, Boyle revealed that he passed on the movie.

=== Sunshine sequels ===
On June 11, 2025, Boyle revealed that he and Alex Garland had an outline for 2 sequels to Sunshine, that were cancelled because of the box office failure of the film.

=== Untitled I Am Kloot movie musical ===
On September 12, 2008, Boyle revealed that he and the English band I Am Kloot are working on an original musical.

=== My Fair Lady film ===
On March 4, 2009, Boyle was set to direct the feature film adaptation of the musical My Fair Lady with Emma Thompson writing the screenplay and Columbia Pictures set to distribute, until late in 2009, when John Madden was hired to direct instead.

=== Hanna ===
On March 4, 2009, Boyle was set to direct the Seth Lochhead’s action thriller screenplay Hanna and Columbia Pictures set to distribute, before Joe Wright was confirmed to direct, after Saoirse Ronan prompted the producers to consider Wright.

== 2010s ==
=== Smash & Grab feature film ===
On October 4, 2013, Boyle was set to direct a feature film adaptation of the Pink Panthers documentary Smash & Grab, with Fox Searchlight Pictures and Pathe producing the movie along with Christian Colson and Boyle’s Cloud Eight Films.

=== Telemark miniseries ===
On October 11, 2013, Boyle was set to direct the World War 2 miniseries “Telemark,” with Simon Beaufoy writing, Christian Colson producing with Cloud Eight Films & Decibel for FX.

=== Untitled David Bowie movie musical ===
In 2014, Boyle was set to direct a jukebox musical featuring David Bowie’s songs with Frank Cottrell Boyce writing the screenplay, until Bowie rejected the project and Boyle agreed to direct Steve Jobs.

=== Miss Saigon movie musical ===
On March 10, 2016, Boyle was in talks to direct the feature film adaptation of the musical Miss Saigon with Cameron Mackintosh and Working Title Films’ Tim Bevan and Eric Fellner set to produce the film.

== 2020s ==
=== Methuselah ===
On May 15, 2020, after James Watkins, Joachim Rønning, Tony Gilroy, and Jon Watts were hired to direct the biblical epic “Methuselah,” Boyle was set to direct with Beaufoy writing a new draft, Michael B. Jordan attached to star and produce with David Heyman and Jeffrey Clifford for Warner Bros. to distribute.

=== Antarctica ===
On March 9, 2023, Boyle was set to direct and write “Antarctica,” a survival drama about Colin O’Brady and Louis Rudd’s race to be the first person to traverse Antarctica alone for Searchlight Pictures to distribute, and later that July, it was reported that Colin Farrell and Austin Butler were in talks to star in the movie.

== Offers ==
=== American Psycho ===
In the 1990's, Boyle was offered to direct the feature film adaptation of Bret Easton Ellis's novel American Psycho because he was on Leonardo DiCaprio's shortlist for directors for Lionsgate Films to hire, which was ultimately directed by Mary Harron.
