= Grace Dove =

Canadian actress and television host (born 1991)

- Born: July 25, 1991 (age 35); Canim Lake, British Columbia, Canada
- Education: Kelly Road Secondary School; Vancouver Film School
- Occupations: Actress; TV host
- Years active: 2012–present
- Known for: The Revenant; How It Ends; The Amazing Race Canada 11; Bones of Crows; Monkey Beach; Alaska Daily
- Awards: American Indian Film Festival Award for Best Actress

Grace Dove (born July 25, 1991) is a Canadian actress and television host, early known for her role as Hugh Glass' wife in the 2015 film The Revenant; as well as Ricki, a talented mechanic in the 2018 film How It Ends. In 2022, she starred alongside two-time Academy Awards winner Hilary Swank in the ABC network drama Alaska Daily, as journalists shining light on missing and murdered indigenous women and girls (MMIWG). She also starred in Marie Clements' 2022 film, Bones of Crows as Aline Spears, a woman who survives the Canadian residential school system to become a Code Talker for the Canadian Air Force.

== Early life and education ==
Dove was born on July 25, 1991, and is Secwepemc from the Canim Lake Indian Band in the Cariboo region of British Columbia. She was raised in Prince George, British Columbia, where she attended Salmon Valley Elementary School and Kelly Road Secondary School. Her father was a filmmaker who took her on visits to Hollywood when she was a child. After graduation from high school, she moved to Vancouver to study acting at Vancouver Film School.

== Career ==
At age ten, she landed a part as on-air correspondent of the Prince George TV children's show Splatterday. She has also worked as a co-host of the reality action/adventure TV show UnderExposed, and appeared in the short film These Walls. (2012). Dove said she went on many auditions after acting school before she landed the part of Hugh Glass's unnamed Pawnee wife. The Revenant's director Alejandro González Iñárritu did not audition her 'in the normal way' but "instead had some questions and a process that dug into who I was." she said. After she got the part, playing an emotionally demanding role opposite Leonardo DiCaprio, she said she "had to go in there extremely open without any expectations. Just like the audition process and even the filming process, I didn't know what exactly I was getting into. I prepared myself physically, emotionally and spiritually to be as open as possible so I could take direction, feed off my surroundings, and feed off my relationship with Leonardo within the scene. Obviously it's a period piece and so I was trying to connect to a layer of my ancestry as well."

In 2016, The New York Times mentioned her as one of the 'lesser known faces' of the entertainment industry, in whom the fashion industry has taken an interest to promote new fashion.

In 2025, Dove appeared on The Amazing Race Canada 11 with her brother, Joe Syme. They placed runner-up after 10 legs.

== Filmography ==
=== Film ===
Year	Title	Role	Notes
2012	These Walls	Mary	Short film
2014	The Cut	Emma	Uncredited
2015	The Revenant	Wife of Hugh Glass	
2017	O for a Thousand Tongues	Yaahl-Ts'uu-Kuuyas	Short film
2017	Mino Bimaadiziwin	Bangishimogikwe	Short film
2018	How It Ends	Ricki	
2020	Monkey Beach	Lisa	
2021	Hatha	Lena	Short film
2022	Bones of Crows	Aline Spears	
2026	Psycho Killer	Agent Becky Collins	
2026	Jeffrey's Turn	Anna	

=== Television ===
Year	Title	Role	Notes
2014–2015	Kagagi	Cassie Shannon	13 episodes
2017	UnderExposed	Herself	Seasons 2–4; 39 episodes
2020	The Order	Ellie	2 episodes
2020	Flimsy	Parker	Episode: "Chapter 13 – The End"
2020	Journey of My Heart	Ellen Rivers	TV film
2022–2025	Resident Alien	Sunny	2 episodes
2022–2023	Alaska Daily	Roz Friendly	11 episodes
2023	Bones of Crows: The Series	Aline Spears	5 episodes
2025	The Amazing Race Canada 11	Contestant	
