= Janie Jones (film) =

2010 American film by David M. Rosenthal

- Theatrical release poster
- Directed by: David M. Rosenthal
- Written by: David M. Rosenthal
- Produced by: Eric Bassett; Keith Kjarval
- Starring: Abigail Breslin; Alessandro Nivola; Elisabeth Shue; Brittany Snow; Peter Stormare
- Cinematography: Anastas N. Michos
- Edited by: Alan Heim
- Music by: Eef Barzelay
- Production company: Unified Pictures/Industrial Entertainment
- Distributed by: Tribeca Film (USA); VVS Films (Canada)
- Release dates: September 17, 2010 (TIFF); October 28, 2011 (United States)
- Running time: 107 minutes
- Country: United States
- Language: English
- Box office: $6,840

Janie Jones is a 2010 American drama film written and directed by David M. Rosenthal. It stars Abigail Breslin as the title character, as well as Alessandro Nivola, Elisabeth Shue, Brittany Snow, and Peter Stormare. The story is about a fading, alcoholic rock star meeting his daughter for the first time after being left by her drugged-up mother, and the growing relationship they have while on tour. Rosenthal based the film's storyline on his real-life meeting with his own daughter.

The film makes extensive use of original music created by Gemma Hayes and Eef Barzelay, and is performed by Breslin and Nivola. It was shot in Des Moines in September 2009. It premiered at the 2010 Toronto International Film Festival on September 17, 2010, got picked up by Tribeca Film to show at their festival on April 29, 2011, and was given a limited release on October 28. Janie Jones received mixed reviews from critics who gave praise to the two main leads, but found Rosenthal's storytelling and direction lacking in terms of originality and tonal pacing.

== Plot ==
Janie Jones is a 13-year-old aspiring musician. She arrives at a concert with her meth-addicted mother, Mary Ann Jones, a former groupie who once followed the band of Ethan Brand, a washed-up rock star battling alcoholism. Unknown to Ethan, he’s Janie’s biological father, a truth Mary Ann kept hidden for years.

In a desperate attempt to set her daughter on a better path, Mary Ann reveals to Ethan that Janie is his daughter, begging him to take responsibility while she enters rehab. Ethan, recognizing her but pretending not to, coldly rejects Mary Ann's plea and throws her out. During the show, Mary Ann abandons Janie, and devastated, the girl calls the police. With no sign of Mary Ann and her phone turned off, Officer Dickerson informs Ethan and his girlfriend Iris of the situation.

Because of Mary Ann's recent drug possession charge and Ethan's name on Janie's birth certificate, if Janie ends up in state care, Ethan will be labeled a "Deadbeat Dad," which could lead to legal trouble and even imprisonment. To avoid this, Ethan begrudgingly agrees to take Janie on tour, much to Iris's dismay. Janie gets to know Ethan's band: lead guitarist Billy, drummer Chuck, bassist Dave, and manager Sloan. While most of the band is uneasy around her, Sloan is the only one who shows her kindness and support. As the tour continues, Janie's presence and Ethan's erratic behavior cause friction. When Ethan finds out that Iris has been cheating on him with Billy, he drunkenly announces it to the crowd during a show, leading to a fight and the band walking off stage.

Iris leaves him, and the band members scold Ethan for his reckless actions. In a motel, Sloan shows Ethan a video of the fight that's gone viral on YouTube. Ethan, upset, tells Sloan that Janie has to go, but she overhears this and feels heartbroken. As the band continues performing, Janie stays by Ethan's side, but his alcoholism worsens. The two start to bond after Janie plays "House of the Rising Sun," and Ethan starts to open up.

Frustrated with Ethan's behavior, the band members quit, and Chuck punches him. With no band left, Ethan decides to continue the tour by himself, getting ready to play South by Southwest as a solo act. Sloan flies back to Chicago, and Janie travels with Ethan in a beat-up car. They begin to form a real connection as they hit the road together. At one show, when the crowd gives Ethan no attention, a confrontation erupts. Janie steps in, performing one of her own songs, impressing the crowd and the venue owner, who offers to sign them as a father-daughter duo. Ethan reluctantly agrees, and Janie is overjoyed.

As the duo tours together, their bond deepens, but Ethan's alcoholism remains a problem. During a show, Ethan drunkenly attacks a man who made sexual remarks about Janie. Despite her protests, he's arrested, and with no one else to turn to, Janie pawns their equipment to bail him out. After a tearful reunion, Ethan apologizes for his behavior and reconciles with Janie, but without the money to get their gear back, they turn to Ethan’s estranged mother, Lily, for help. She's disgusted by Ethan’s life choices and initially refuses to believe that Janie is his daughter. Eventually, Ethan convinces her by admitting his true role as a father, and Lily gives them the money.

Back on the road, Ethan opens up to Janie about his troubled past, including the tragic death of his father when he was 9. With the money, they buy back their equipment, and Mary Ann calls to let Ethan know that she’s finished rehab and back home. When Ethan visits, he finds that Mary Ann and her boyfriend have been sober for a month. He apologizes for not being there for Janie, explaining how much she’s changed his life. After a heartfelt farewell, Ethan can’t bear to leave Janie behind. He asks her to go with him to South by Southwest, and she happily agrees as long as he knows that she has to come back home.

Ethan and Janie perform together as a father-daughter duo in front of a large crowd at South by Southwest, as they begin a new chapter of their lives.

== Cast ==
- Abigail Breslin as Janie Jones
- Alessandro Nivola as Ethan Brand
- Elisabeth Shue as Mary Ann Jones
- Brittany Snow as Iris
- Peter Stormare as Sloan
- Joel David Moore as Dave
- Frances Fisher as Lily Brand
- Frank Whaley as Chuck
- Rodney Eastman as Billy

== Production ==
David M. Rosenthal was inspired to make Janie Jones based on the experience he had meeting his daughter for the first time when she was eleven and he was thirty. Abigail Breslin got the script while filming Zombieland, and was interested in the story and its title character. Adding that, the musical aspect was initially "nerve-wracking" when it came to professionally singing and playing guitar, but soon came to like it. Alessandro Nivola was given the script after shooting Coco Before Chanel in France for four months, and found it a great departure from the previous film he worked on due to the music grabbing his interest. Filming began in September 2009 at Des Moines, Iowa.

== Soundtrack ==
Janie Jones - Original Motion Picture Soundtrack

Soundtrack album by various artists
- Released: October 11, 2011
- Length: 32:31
- Label: Nettwerk

The film's soundtrack was released on October 11, 2011 featuring songs written by Irish singer-songwriter Gemma Hayes and Israeli-born American Eef Barzelay. The songs on the album are performed by Abigail Breslin, Alessandro Nivola, Patrick Watson, William Fitzsimmons and Gemma Hayes.

No.	Title	Artist	Length
1.	"Hurricane"	Abigail Breslin	3:08
2.	"Find Love"	Abigail Breslin and Alessandro Nivola	2:35
3.	"Fight for Me"	Abigail Breslin	3:17
4.	"Just a Game"	Abigail Breslin	2:32
5.	"The Great Escape"	Patrick Watson	3:07
6.	"Please"	Alessandro Nivola	2:28
7.	"Never Done"	Alessandro Nivola	4:09
8.	"All at Once"	Alessandro Nivola	2:35
9.	"Even Now"	William Fitzsimmons	2:53
10.	"Waiting for You"	Gemma Hayes	3:16
11.	"House of the Rising Sun"	Abigail Breslin	2:31

== Release ==
Janie Jones premiered at the Toronto International Film Festival on September 17, 2010. It was acquired by Tribeca Film after its premiere at TIFF and was screened at their festival on April 29, 2011. It was originally given a Summer 2011 theatrical release, as well as on video-on-demand and other platforms, but had a free screening on October 11 and was given a limited release on October 28. During its weekly run, the film grossed $3,297 from two theatres, averaging $1,648 per theater, and ranking number 103 at the box office. It garnered a total gross of $6,480 after 10 weeks of release, with a widest release of two theatres. The film was released on DVD on January 31, 2012.

== Reception ==
Janie Jones garnered mixed reviews from critics. On the review aggregator website Rotten Tomatoes, 56% of 32 critics' reviews are positive, with an average rating of 5.4/10. Metacritic, which uses a weighted average, assigned the film a score of 52 out of 100, based on 16 critics, indicating "mixed or average" reviews.

Noel Murray of The A.V. Club gave the film a B− grade. Despite the tonal dissonance in Rosenthal's direction of his own script, he called it "one of the more realistic depictions of what the rock 'n' roll lifestyle is really like", adding that the songs written by both Barzelay and Hayes make the concert scenes "look and sound like actual alt-rock shows." Eric Kohn of IndieWire commended Rosenthal for being able to sidestep formulaic contrivances with filmmaker's restraint and trusting his two main leads to give their characters subtly, saying that "[A]lthough not exemplary, Janie Jones at least manages to give its tired scenario a sense of legitimacy." Kenji Fujishima of Slant Magazine said that viewers will be able to get through the film's "panoply of clichés" and "defiantly generic, low-stakes terms" because of Nivola and Breslin's respective character portrayals, concluding that "even if Rosenthal's film is almost astoundingly unambitious, at least it's generous and warmhearted enough to be reasonably inoffensive. Oh, and the songs aren't too bad, either: bland but pleasant, much like the film itself."

Ray Bennett of The Hollywood Reporter wrote that: "The film's original songs are low key, the storytelling lacks any kind of vivid insights into life on the road that have not been seen before and the outcome is signposted clearly. The production is more a promise of what the filmmaker and performers might have to offer in the future that anything likely to make a mark with audiences." Tom Russo of The Boston Globe felt that Rosenthal's filmmaking didn't deliver any "sharply defined" scenes close to the opener and caused some "distractingly erratic" characterizations for his two leads due to tonal pacing, concluding that the film "would feel more assured if Rosenthal had shown more inclination to commit."

Breslin and Nivola both received praise for their performances. The Washington Post's Ann Hornaday called them "a terrific mismatched pair" that can "harmonize not only figuratively but literally." Ian Buckwalter of NPR felt that the focus shift to its two main leads in the second half improves the film slightly, saying that "Breslin remains as charismatic and instantly likable as she was in her Oscar-nominated role in Little Miss Sunshine, and the often under-the-radar Nivola shows the makings of a star." He added that the film carries a "lightweight sweetness" due to the chemistry between them. Bennett commended Nivola for having "the grizzled charm and arrogance of a rock star" but said the film's appeal rests on Breslin who displays "spirit and singing ability" in her role, saying that she gets "a sturdy peg for her ongoing growth as a film actor. While it's not likely to be a highlight in her career, it's no shame either." Russo also praised both actors' performances, saying that Nivola does "a convincingly edgy downward spiral" done by his character and Breslin portrays the title role like "a kid believably rolling with adults' bad behavior because she doesn't know how else to respond."

In a review for the Los Angeles Times, Robert Abele said that Nivola "does a serviceable job conveying a certain kind of brittle, hotheaded flameout with remnants of musical soulfulness worth reviving" but felt that Breslin wasn't given much opposite him in a role that "should feel like more of a title character than a programmatic catalyst for his redemptive change."

Frances Fisher was nominated for Best Supporting Actress by the Chlotrudis Society for Independent Films for her work in the film, but ultimately lost to Lesley Manville for Another Year.
