= The Amazing Race Canada 11 =

Season of television series

- Season 11
- Presented by: Jon Montgomery
- No. of teams: 11
- Winners: Jesse Harink & Jonathon Braun
- No. of legs: 10
- Distance traveled: 19,000 km (12,000 mi)
- No. of episodes: 10

Release
- Original network: CTV
- Original release: July 8 – September 16, 2025

Additional information
- Filming dates: April 22 – May 16, 2025

Series chronology
- ← Previous; Season 10 Next → Season 12

The Amazing Race Canada 11 is the eleventh season of The Amazing Race Canada, a Canadian reality competition show based on the American series The Amazing Race. Hosted by Jon Montgomery, it features eleven teams of two, each with a pre-existing relationship, competing in a race across Canada. The grand prize included a CA$250,000 cash payout, a trip around the world, and two 2025 Chevrolet Blazer EV SS vehicles. Filming took place between April 22 and May 16, 2025. This season visited five provinces and one territory and travelled over 19,000 kilometres (12,000 mi) during ten legs. Starting in Edmonton, racers travelled through Alberta, British Columbia, the Northwest Territories, Quebec, Ontario, and Newfoundland and Labrador before finishing in The Blue Mountains, Ontario. Elements of the show that returned for this season include the non-elimination leg and the Speed Bump. New elements introduced in this season include the Double Roadblock, where both team members had to perform a task at a Roadblock. The season premiered on CTV on July 8, 2025, and concluded on September 16, 2025.

Best friends Jesse Harink and Jonathon Braun were the winners of this season, while siblings Grace Dove and Joe Syme were the runners-up, brothers EB and Blake Burnett finished in third place, and married couple Skylene "Nipîy" Gladue and Blair "Magoo" Gladue finished in fourth place.

== Production ==
=== Development and filming ===
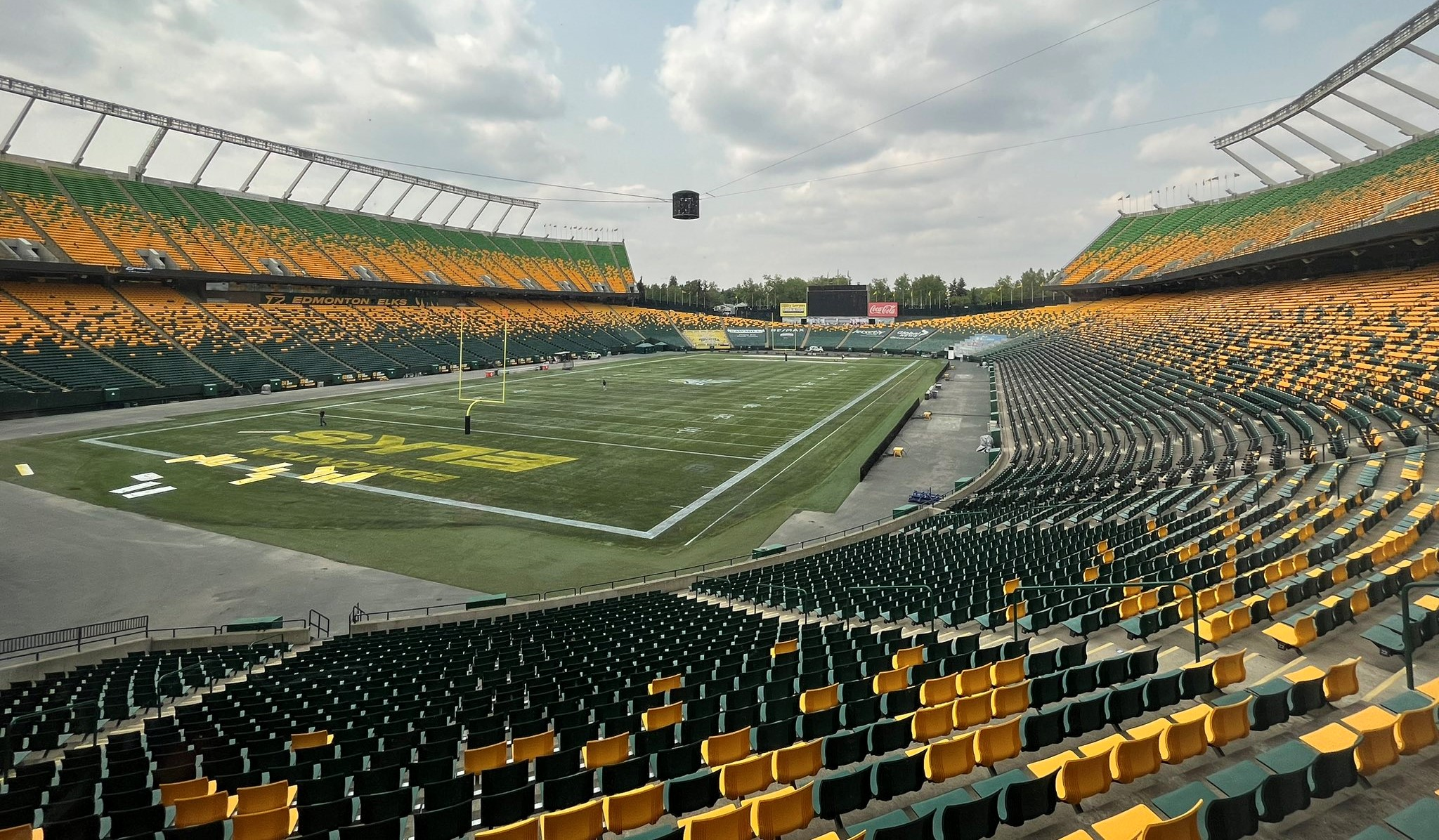
Eleven teams began the eleventh season where the tenth season concluded: Commonwealth Stadium.

Following the finale of the tenth season on September 10, 2024, CTV announced that The Amazing Race Canada was renewed for an eleventh season.

Filming for this season began on April 22, 2025, in Edmonton and Red Deer, Alberta. Teams were spotted outside of BC Place on April 26, 2025, before travelling into Fraser Valley the next day. Filming took place in Inuvik, Northwest Territories, on April 30, 2025, which also included a first-time visit to the Arctic Ocean. A Pass board was photographed in Prince George, British Columbia, on May 3, 2025. A leg was shot in Gananoque, Ontario, on May 9, 2025. Teams travelled to Mississauga by the next day. Filming concluded on May 16, 2025.

The first episode was dedicated to Ann Camilleri, a producer of The Amazing Race Canada who died shortly after production on the eleventh season wrapped.

=== Casting ===
Casting for this season opened on October 8, 2024, and closed on December 15.

=== Broadcast ===
On June 18, 2025, CTV announced that this season would premiere on July 8, 2025.

=== Marketing ===
Chevrolet, Expedia, Desjardins Group, Paramount Pictures, which promoted Smurfs, and Boost returned as sponsors. New sponsors included FUZE Iced Tea and Specsavers Canada.

== Cast ==
The cast was revealed on June 25, 2025, and includes married Big Brother Canada contestants Ika Wong and Demetres Giannitsos, dating couple Brendan McDougall from season 8 and Sam May from season 10, actress Grace Dove, and Edmonton Oilers superfan Blair Gladue, also known as Superfan Magoo.

Contestants	Age	Relationship	Hometown	Status
Michele Peter	39	Cousins	Toronto, Ontario	Eliminated 1st (in Red Deer, Alberta)
Aditi Deonarine	38	Cousins	Toronto, Ontario	Eliminated 1st (in Red Deer, Alberta)
Brendan McDougall The Amazing Race Canada 8	32	Dating Couple	McDougall, Ontario	Eliminated 2nd (in Golden, British Columbia)
Sam May The Amazing Race Canada 10	26	Dating Couple	Toronto, Ontario	Eliminated 2nd (in Golden, British Columbia)
Osas Igbinosun	31	Siblings	Calgary, Alberta	Eliminated 3rd (in Cultus Lake, British Columbia)
Esosa Igbinosun	35	Siblings	Calgary, Alberta	Eliminated 3rd (in Cultus Lake, British Columbia)
Louis Octeau-Piché	32	Son & Mother	Vaudreuil-Dorion, Quebec	Eliminated 4th (in Prince George, British Columbia)
Marie Octeau	58	Son & Mother	Vaudreuil-Dorion, Quebec	Eliminated 4th (in Prince George, British Columbia)
Rebecca Merasty	35	Friends	Vancouver, British Columbia	Eliminated 5th (in Sutton, Quebec)
Rebecca Ekenale Watt	33	Friends	Vancouver, British Columbia	Eliminated 5th (in Sutton, Quebec)
Lacey Koughan	26	Siblings	Charlottetown, Prince Edward Island	Eliminated 6th (in Mississauga, Ontario)
Celia Koughan	29	Siblings	Charlottetown, Prince Edward Island	Eliminated 6th (in Mississauga, Ontario)
Ika Wong	40	Married Couple	Toronto, Ontario	Eliminated 7th (in Gander, Newfoundland and Labrador)
Demetres Giannitsos	33	Married Couple	Toronto, Ontario	Eliminated 7th (in Gander, Newfoundland and Labrador)
Skylene "Nipîy" Gladue	45	Married Couple	Edmonton, Alberta	Fourth place
Blair "Magoo" Gladue	51	Married Couple	Edmonton, Alberta	Fourth place
EB Burnett	22	Siblings	Toronto, Ontario	Third place
Blake Burnett	26	Siblings	Toronto, Ontario	Third place
Grace Dove	33	Siblings	Prince George, British Columbia	Runners-up
Joe Syme	35	Siblings	Prince George, British Columbia	Runners-up
Jesse Harink	33	Best Friends	Sherwood Park, Alberta	Winners
Jonathon Braun	36	Best Friends	Woodlawn, Ontario	Winners

Future appearances

In 2026, Nipîy Iskwew competed on the fourth season of The Traitors Canada.

== Results ==
The following teams are listed with their placements in each leg. Placements are listed in finishing order.

- A red placement with a dagger (†) indicates that the team was eliminated.
- An underlined blue placement with a double-dagger (‡) indicates that the team was the last to arrive at a Pit Stop in a non-elimination leg, and had to perform a Speed Bump task in the following leg.
- An italicized and underlined placement indicates that the team was the last to arrive at a Pit Stop, but there was no rest period at the Pit Stop and all teams were instructed to continue racing.
- A green α indicates that the team found the Assist during the leg.
- A purple ε indicates that the team used an Express Pass on that leg to bypass one of their tasks.
- A brown ⊂ indicates the team on the receiving end of a U-Turn.
- A brown ∈ indicates that the team used the Pass and a brown ∋ indicates the team on the receiving end of the Pass.
- A teal х indicates that the leg featured a Face Off challenge.

Team placement (by leg)
Team	1	2	3х	4	5	6х	7	8	9	10
Jesse & Jonathon	1st	1st	1st^{ε}_{⊂} (Note: This team used their Express Pass to bypass one of the tasks on this leg.) (Note: Louis & Marie gave Jesse & Jonathon their second Express Pass in the middle of the leg.)	2ndα (Note: This team used the Assist on this leg.)	1st∋ (Note: Nipîy & Magoo chose to use the Pass on Jesse & Jonathan.)	2nd^{∋}_{∈} (Note: EB & Blake chose to use the Pass on Jesse & Jonathan.) (Note: Jesse & Jonathon chose to use the Pass on Ika & Demetres.)	5th	3rd⊂	3rd	1st
Grace & Joe	10th	2nd	5th⊂	7th	6th∈ (Note: Grace & Joe chose to use the Pass on Ika & Demetres.)	4th	1st	1st	2nd	2nd
EB & Blake	2nd	4thα	6th	1st	5th	1st∈	2nd	5th⊂	4th	3rd
Nipîy & Magoo (Note: Listed as Skylene & Blair during the first episode.)	3rd	8th	7th	5th	3rd∈	6th	6th	4th	1st	4th
Ika & Demetres	7th	3rd	2nd	3rd	4th^{α}_{∋}	5th∋	4th	2nd	5th†	
Lacey & Celia	8th	6th	3rd	8th‡	7th	3rd	3rd	6th†		
Rebecca & Rebecca	4thα	7th	4th	6th	2nd	7th†α				
Louis & Marie	9th	5th	8thε	4th	8th†					
Osas & Esosa	6th	9thε	9th†							
Brendan & Sam	5th	10th†								
Michele & Aditi	11th†									

== Race summary ==
Destinations	Air travel Rail travel Water travel Bus travel Helicopter travel Bicycle travel Gondola travel
Route Markers	Detour Roadblock Face Off Express Pass Assist; U-Turn Pass Speed Bump Pit Stop

=== Leg 1 (Alberta) ===
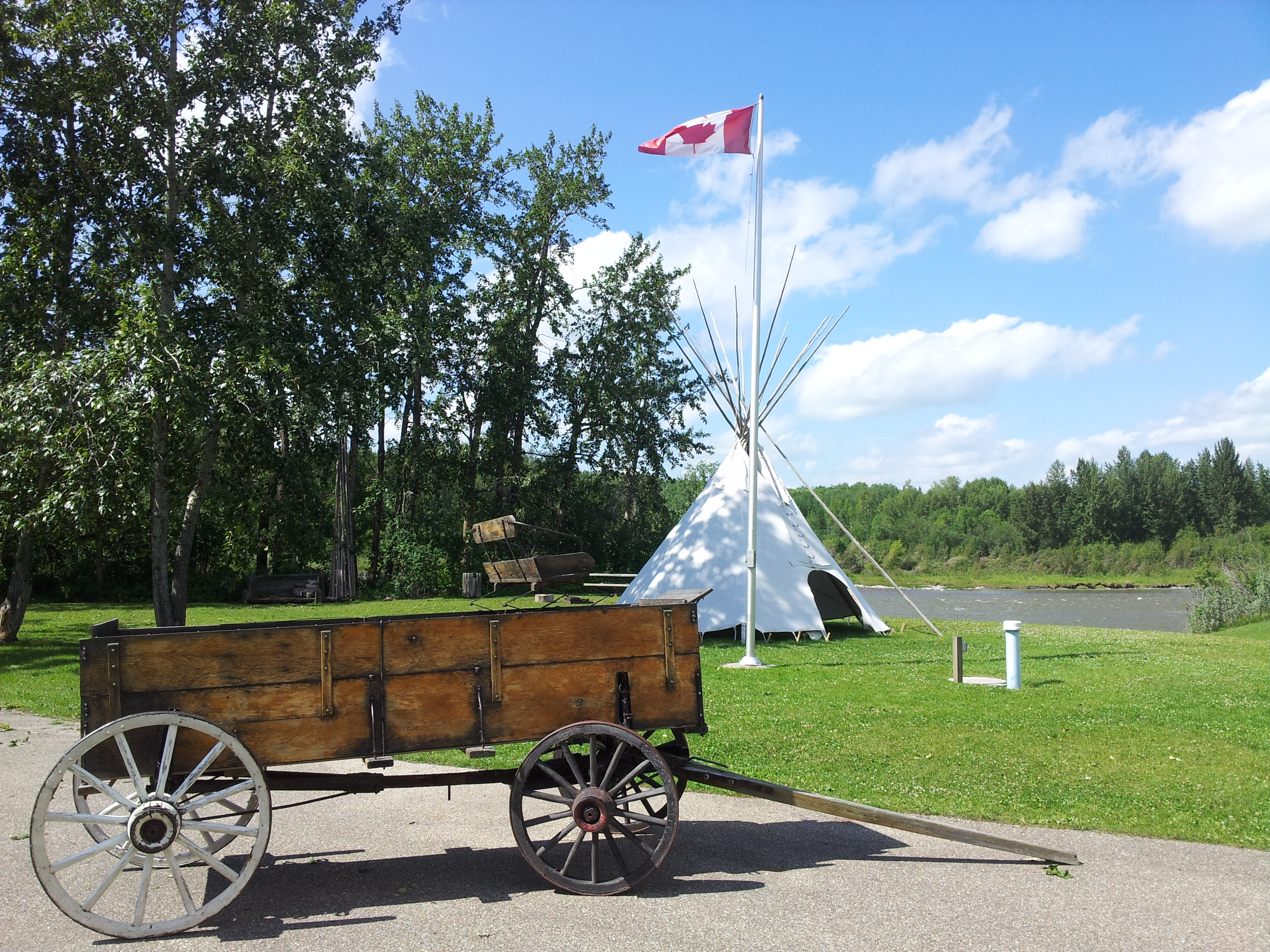
The first leg of the season concluded on the banks of the Red Deer River at Fort Normandeau.

- Episode 1: "Canada Is Something Special" (July 8, 2025)
- Prize: CA$10,000 and a trip for two to Bali, Indonesia (awarded to Jesse & Jonathon)
- Eliminated: Michele & Aditi

Locations

- Edmonton, Alberta (Commonwealth Stadium) (Starting Line)
- Edmonton (Edmonton Fencing Club or Edmonton Potters' Guild)
- Red Deer County (Canyon Ski Resort)
- Red Deer (The Silver Buckle)
- Red Deer (Fort Normandeau)

Episode summary

- Teams began at Commonwealth Stadium and had to search the seats for their first clue. Teams then had to rappel down from the stands to their bags and their next clue.
- This season's first Detour was a choice between On The Fence or Behind The Wheel. In On The Fence, teams had to compete in a fencing bout, alternating one team member at a time, and score three touchés against an opponent using an épée to receive their next clue from Olympic medalist Luan Jujie. In Behind The Wheel, one team member had to make a clay pot using a potter's wheel while blindfolded and under verbal guidance from their partner to receive their next clue.
- After the Detour, teams had to drive to Canyon Ski Resort outside of Red Deer and find their next clue. There, one team member had to ride an alpine coaster and count how many seconds the ride lasted within two seconds to receive their next clue. The Assist was hidden in one clue, found by Rebecca & Rebecca, and allowed them to guess within five seconds.
- In this season's first Roadblock, one team member had to perform a country–western line dance alongside the Country Pride Dance Club to receive their next clue, which directed them to the Pit Stop: Fort Normandeau.

=== Leg 2 (Alberta → British Columbia) ===
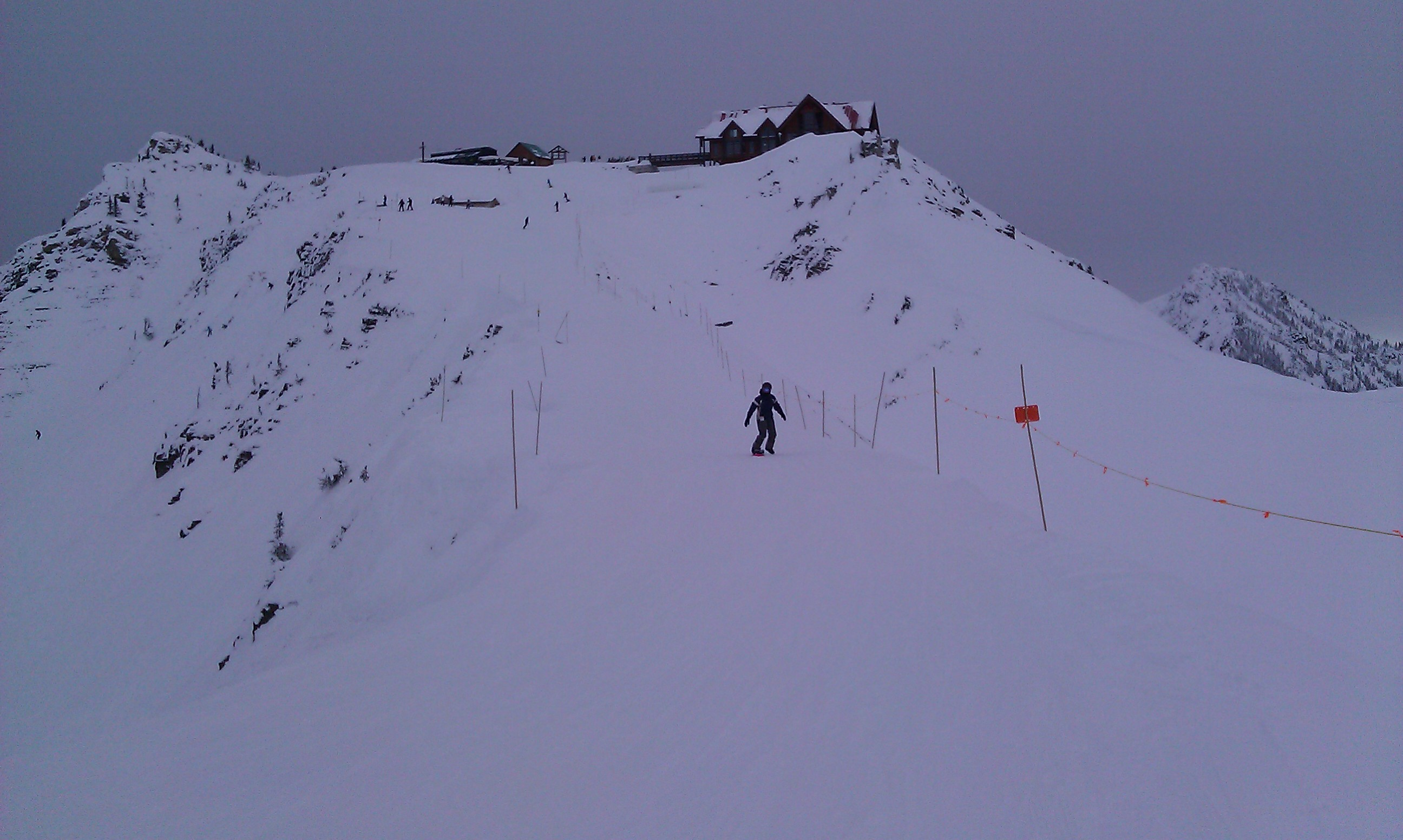
The Detour in Golden had teams traversing the Kicking Horse Mountain Resort.

- Episode 2: "I'd Hug You But I Smell" (July 15, 2025)
- Prize: CA$15,000 and a trip for two to Tokyo, Japan (awarded to Jesse & Jonathon)
- Eliminated: Brendan & Sam

Locations

- Red Deer (Red Deer Resort & Casino)
- Red Deer (Red Deer City Hall) → Lake Louise (Lake Louise Mountain Resort)
- Lake Louise (Brewsters Stables)
- Golden, British Columbia (Mount 7)
- Golden (Kicking Horse Mountain Resort)
- Golden (Golden Skybridge)

Episode summary

- At the start of this leg, teams were instructed to travel to Red Deer City Hall and sign up for one of two buses to the Lake Louise Mountain Resort.
- Teams had an opportunity to win an Express Pass by chiseling out clues from ice blocks, two of which had Express Passes. Marie & Louis won two, and Osas & Esosa won one.
- In this leg's Roadblock, one team member had to toss a lasso at numbered pegs until they wrapped the rope around pegs with a total of three points to receive their next clue.
- After the Roadblock, teams had to drive to Golden, British Columbia, and find their next clue at Mount 7. Teams then had to search the forest for a mushroom house with Papa Smurf to receive their next clue, which sent them to Kicking Horse Mountain Resort. Osas & Esosa used their Express Pass to bypass this task.
- This leg's Detour was a choice between Sled It or Tread It. In Sled It, teams had to load a sled with 90 kilograms (200 lb) of supplies and then one team member had to pull the sled up the slope while their partner steered to receive their next clue. In Tread It, teams had to assemble snowshoes using sticks and then hike a mountain course to receive their next clue. The Assist was hidden in one clue, found by EB & Blake, who chose Sled It, and provided them with a pre-packed sled.
- After the Detour, teams had to check in at the Pit Stop: the Golden Skybridge.

=== Leg 3 (Alberta → British Columbia) ===
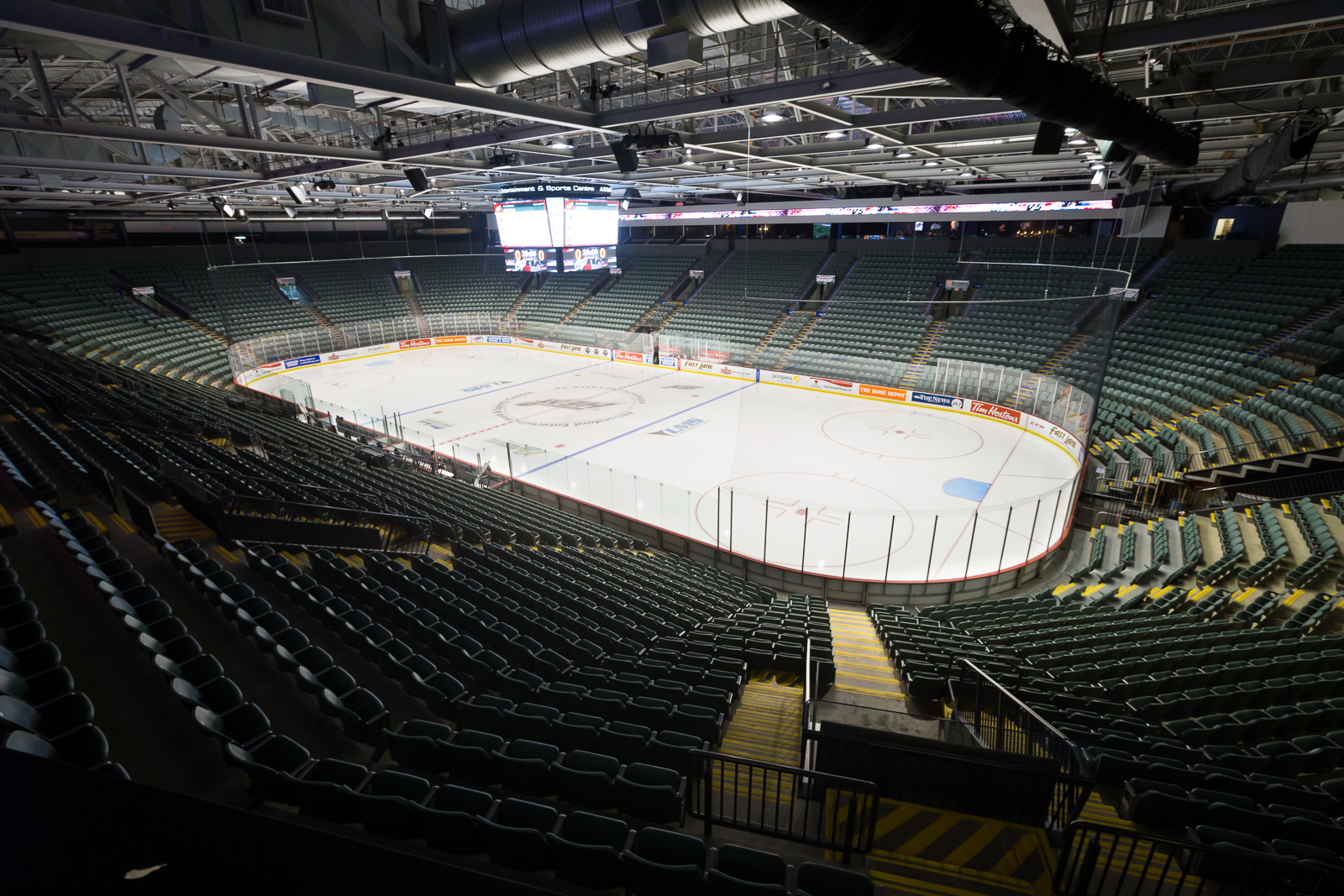
Teams took to the ice for a hockey Face Off at the Abbotsford Centre in Fraser Valley.

- Episode 3: "Those Little Sneaky Susans" (July 22, 2025)
- Prize: CA$10,000 and a trip for two to Queenstown, New Zealand (awarded to Jesse & Jonathon)
- Eliminated: Osas & Esosa

Locations

- Lake Louise, Alberta (Chateau Lake Louise)
- Calgary (Calgary International Airport) → Vancouver, British Columbia
- Vancouver (BC Place – Terry Fox Plaza)
- Langley Township (Martini Town)
- Abbotsford (Abbotsford Centre)
- Abbostford (Highstreet Shopping Centre – Specsavers)
- Fort Langley (Village Antiques Mall or Fort Langley National Historic Site – Tradish Ancestor Cafe)
- Cultus Lake (Cultus Lake Adventure Park)

Episode summary

- At the start of this leg, teams were instructed to drive to Calgary International Airport and sign up for one of two flights to Vancouver, British Columbia. Once there, teams had to travel to Terry Fox Plaza, search a Chevrolet Equinox that listed cities visited by The Amazing Race Canada for red letters, and unscramble the name of their next destination: Langley. Teams then had to drive to Martini Town in Langley and vote to U-Turn another team. After learning the U-Turn results the following day, teams had to serenade each other in the studio backlot to receive their next clue.
- For this season's first Face Off, teams competed against each other in a hockey shootout, where one racer from each team had to shoot three pucks at the opposing team's goal. The team with more goals received their next clue from Abbotsford Canucks goalie Ty Young, while the losing team had to wait for another team. The last team had to turn over an hourglass and wait for the sand to run out before they could continue racing.
- After the Face Off, teams had to drive to Specsavers and insert six lenses into a large eyeglass frame to reveal the phrase EYE EXAM and receive their next clue. Louis & Marie used their Express Pass to bypass this task.
- This leg's Detour was a choice between Take a Hint or Plant Treatment. In Take a Hint, teams had to choose a riddle and search the Village Antiques Mall for an item with an Amazing Race sticker within 10 minutes that matched the description, which they could exchange for their next clue. Jesse & Jonathon used their Express Pass to bypass this task. In Plant Treatment, teams were told illness symptoms for a visitor outside Tradish Ancestor Cafe. They then had to memorize remedies on a menu board and deliver the correct ones to receive their next clue.
- After the Detour, teams had to check in at the Pit Stop: the Cultus Lake Adventure Park.

Additional note

- Teams encountered a U-Turn Vote. The teams' votes were as follows:

U-Turn Vote results
Team	Vote
EB & Blake	Jesse & Jonathon
Grace & Joe	Jesse & Jonathon
Ika & Demetres	Jesse & Jonathon
Jesse & Jonathon	Osas & Esosa
Lacey & Celia	Grace & Joe
Louis & Marie	Grace & Joe
Nipîy & Magoo	Jesse & Jonathon
Osas & Esosa	Grace & Joe
Rebecca & Rebecca	Jesse & Jonathon

=== Leg 4 (British Columbia → Northwest Territories) ===
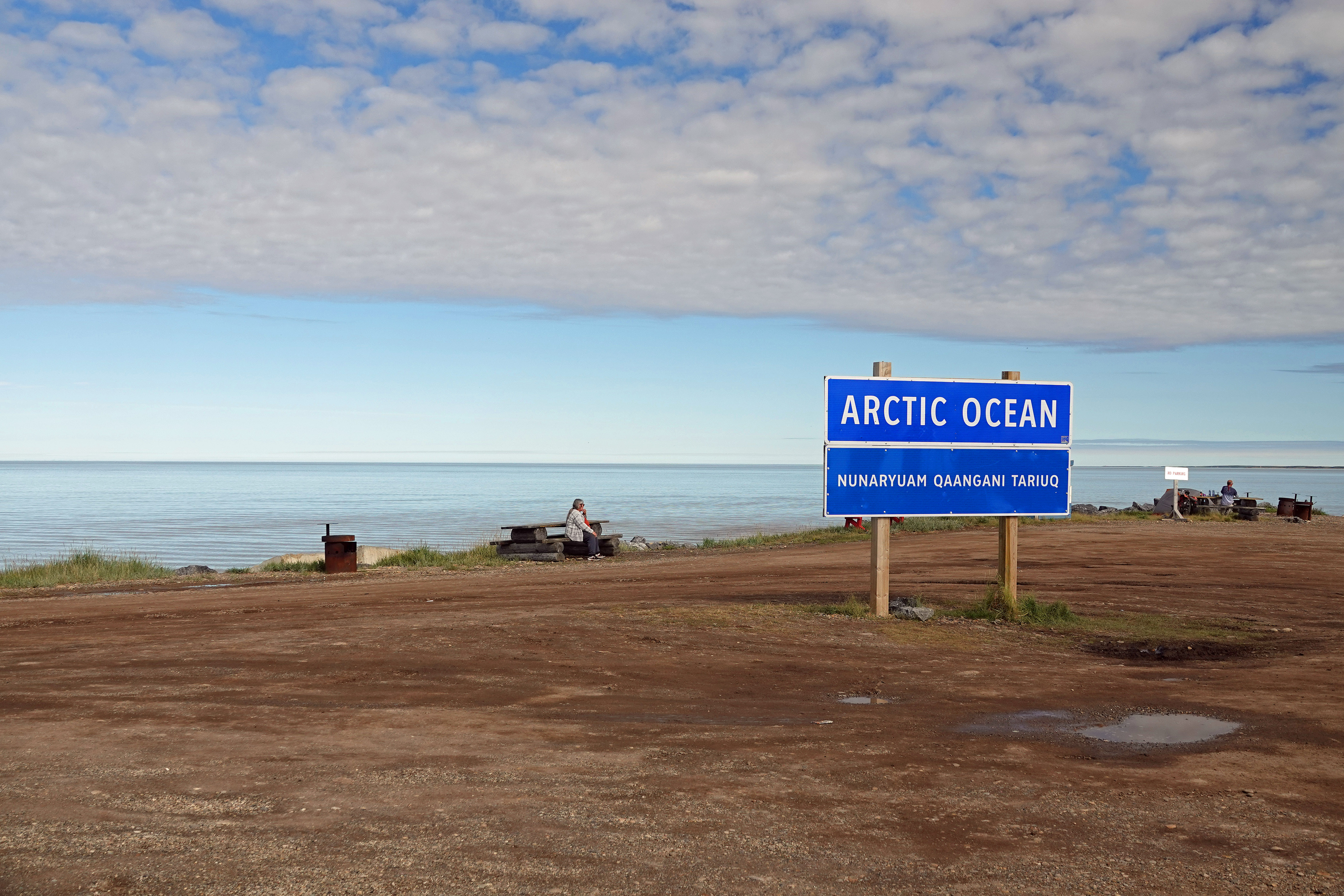
Teams reached the shores of the Arctic Ocean for the northernmost Pit Stop in Amazing Race Canada history within the Inuvik Region.

- Episode 4: "There's Two Joe's" (July 29, 2025)
- Prize: CA$10,000 and a trip for two to Amsterdam, Netherlands (awarded to EB & Blake)

Locations

- Langley Township (Sandman Signature Langley Hotel)
- Vancouver → Inuvik, Northwest Territories
- Inuvik (Ingamo Hall Friendship Centre)
- Inuvik (East Three Elementary School or Inuvik Native Band)
- Inuvik (Arctic Chalet)
- Inuvik (Inuvik Satellite Station)
- Inuvik (Inuvik Airport – Aklak Air) → Tuktoyaktuk
- Tuktoyaktuk (Kitti Hall)
- Tuktoyaktuk (Nuuvuraluuk – Arctic Ocean Sign)

Episode summary

- At the start of this leg, teams were instructed to fly on one of two flights to Inuvik, Northwest Territories, based on their arrival at Vancouver International Airport. Once there, teams had to travel by taxi to the Ingamo Hall Friendship Centre and take part in a Muskrat Jamboree, which involved teams eating two plates of muktuk, caribou rib, reindeer steak, and muskrat to receive their next clue.
- This leg's Detour was a choice between Gahtronatun zheh (English: School) or Iviqsuraaq (English: Stick & Bone). In Gahtronatun zheh, teams had to memorize five questions and answers in Gwichʼin and then answer two questions from a local elder to receive their next clue. In Iviqsuraaq, teams had to assemble five iviqsuraaq toys and deliver them to five locations to receive their next clue.
- In this leg's Roadblock, one team member had to ride on a dog sled, spot seven Arctic animals, and identify them in chronological order to receive their next clue.
- After the Roadblock, teams had to travel to the Inuvik Satellite Station and complete a puzzle of the satellite dish's artwork to receive their next clue. Teams then had to travel to Aklak Air and sign up for one of three flights to Tuktoyaktuk.
- Once in Tuktoyaktuk, teams had to travel to Kitti Hall and complete three out of the following six northern games – swing kick, toe kick, Alaskan high kick, kneel jump, bench reach, stick twist – to receive their next clue. The Assist was hidden in one clue, found by Jesse & Jonathon, and allowed an athlete to perform one game.
- Teams then had to travel on foot to the Pit Stop: the Arctic Ocean Sign on Nuuvuraluuk.

Additional note

- This was a non-elimination leg.

=== Leg 5 (Northwest Territories → British Columbia) ===
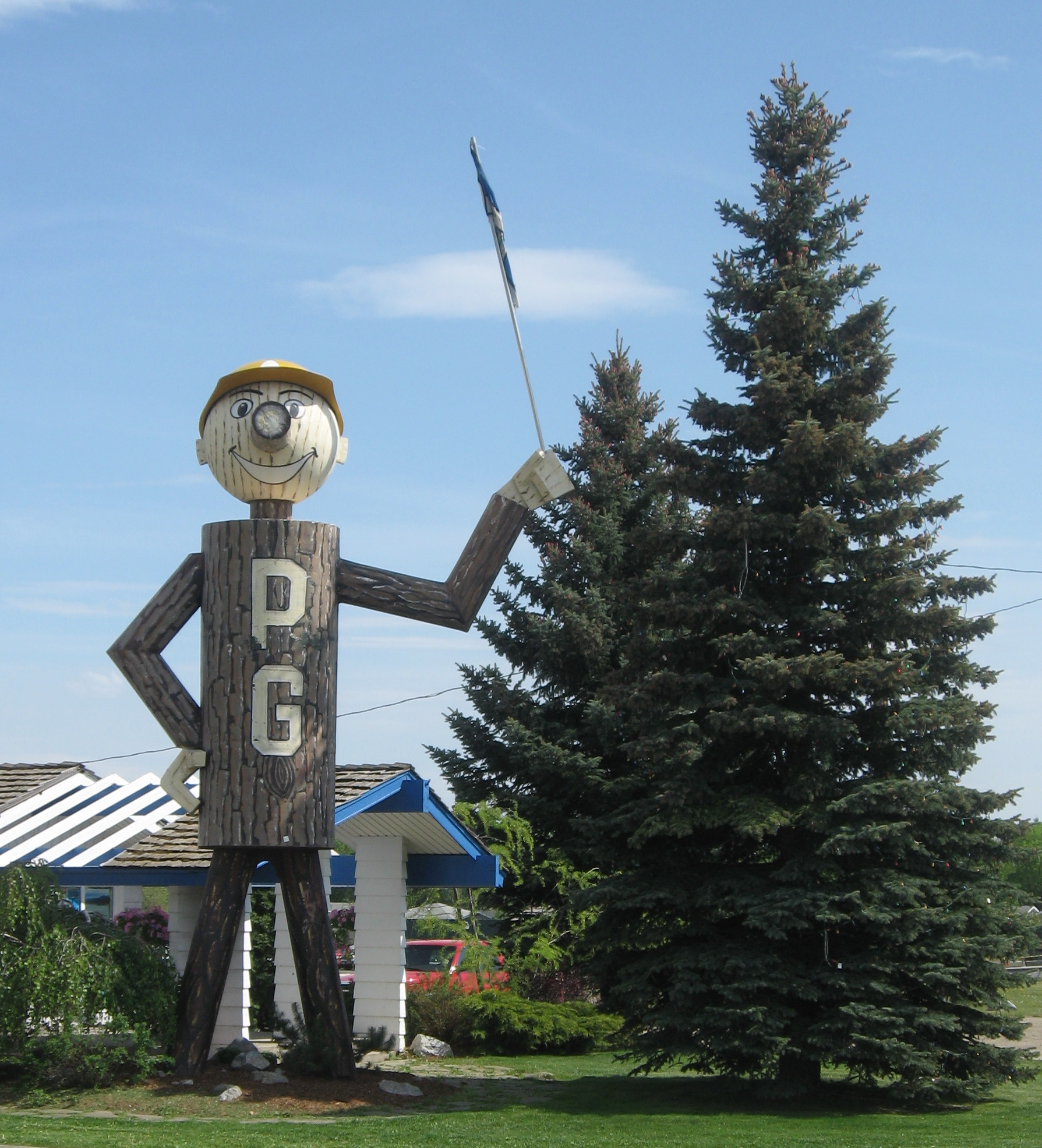
A Blind Double Pass was located beneath the mascot for the city of Prince George: Mr. PG.

- Episode 5: "Prince George in the House" (August 12, 2025)
- Prize: CA$15,000 and a trip for two to Mexico City, Mexico (awarded to Jesse & Jonathon)
- Eliminated: Louis & Marie

Locations

- Inuvik (Inukshuk)
- Inuvik → Prince George, British Columbia (Prince George Airport)
- Prince George (House of Ancestors Cafe)
- Regional District of Fraser–Fort George (Ness Lake Forest Nursery)
- Prince George (Mr. PG)
- Prince George (University of Northern British Columbia or Charles Jago Northern Sport Centre)
- Prince George (Prince George Aquatic Centre)
- Prince George (Connaught Hill Park)

Episode summary

- At the start of this leg, teams were instructed to fly to Prince George, British Columbia. Once there, teams had to search outside the airport for a car with their next clue.
- For their Speed Bump, Lacey & Celia had to drive to the House of Ancestors Cafe and deliver an order of bannock doughnuts to the Ness Lake Forest Nursery before they could continue racing.
- Teams had to drive to the Ness Lake Forest Nursery and search through 100 greenhouses for six pieces of a Mr. PG statue. The Assist was hidden in one clue, found by Ika & Demetres, and provided them with the first two pieces.
- Teams then had to drive to the Mr. PG monument, where they received their next clue.
- This leg's Detour was a choice between Mental Energy or Physical Play. In Mental Energy, teams had to calculate the weight of wood pellets needed to heat a home for 24 hours (40 kilograms). Teams then had to fill burlap sacks with at least 40 kilograms of pellets to receive their next clue. In Physical Play, teams had to play wheelchair badminton and complete a rally of 15 consecutive volleys to receive their next clue.
- In this leg's Roadblock, one team member had to memorize and lead a water aerobics class to receive their next clue, which directed them to the Pit Stop: Connaught Hill Park.

Additional notes

- At the Blind Double Pass, Nipîy & Magoo used the Pass on Jesse & Jonathon, and Grace & Joe used the Pass on Ika & Demetres.
- Indigenous musician Kym Gouchie appeared as the Pit Stop greeter during this leg.

=== Leg 6 (British Columbia → Quebec) ===
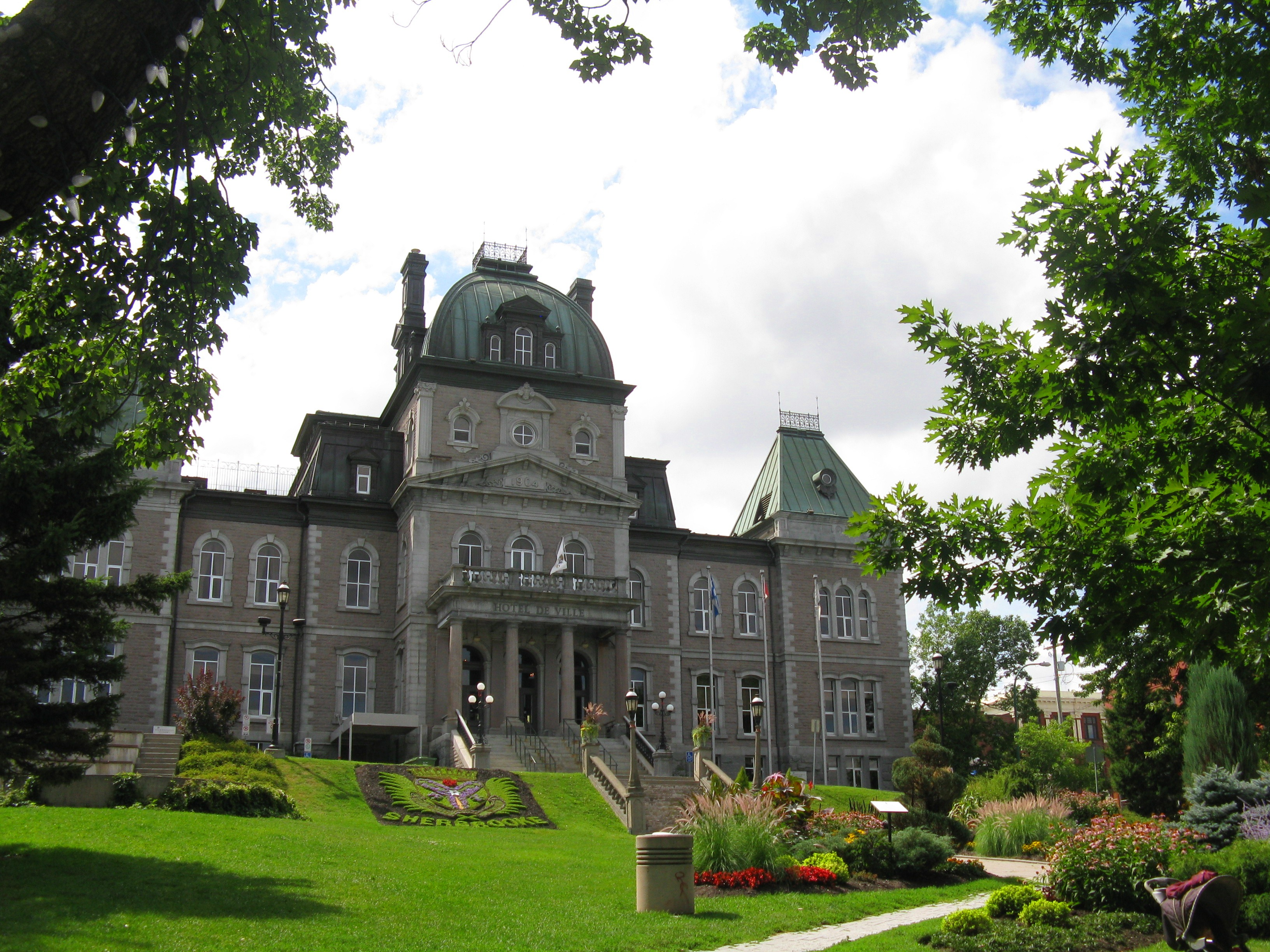
While in Quebec, teams visited Sherbrooke before exploring the Eastern Townships.

- Episode 6: "I Am a Goat" (August 19, 2025)
- Prize: CA$15,000 and a trip for two to Bangkok, Thailand (awarded to EB & Blake)
- Eliminated: Rebecca & Rebecca

Locations

- Prince George (Prestige Treasure Cove Resort)
- Prince George → Montreal, Quebec
- Valcourt (J. Armand Bombardier Ingenuity Museum)
- Sherbrooke (Hôtel de Ville)
- Sherbrooke (Granada Theatre or Circuit des Murales & Place des Moulins)
- Sherbrooke (O-Volt Sherbrooke)
- Bromont (Bromont National Cycling Centre)
- Sutton (Gazebo)
- Sutton (Bob's Farm)
- Sutton (Château Ste-Agnès)

Episode summary

- At the start of this leg, teams were instructed to fly to Montreal, Quebec. Once there, teams had to travel by taxi to the J. Armand Bombardier Ingenuity Museum in Valcourt, choose a marked car, and drive to the Hôtel de Ville in Sherbrooke, where they found their next clue.
- This leg's Detour was a choice between Stage Fright or Wall Sight. In Stage Fright, teams had to perform in French as servers in a play. Midway through the show, teams had to serve four tables within the audience before returning to the stage for their final line to receive their next clue. In Wall Sight, teams were provided with a list of eleven items written in French. Teams then had to find six murals, memorize which murals had which items, and place the items onto an answer board with the murals to receive their next clue.
- For this season's second Face Off, two teams had to compete in a joust. One racer from each team had to balance on a beam, and the first one to knock off their opponent using a pugil stick received their next clue. The losing team had to wait for another team. The last team had to turn over an hourglass and wait for the sand to run out before they could continue racing.
- In this leg's Roadblock, one team member had to ride a bicycle for two laps around the velodrome while remaining above a blue line to receive their next clue.
- After the Roadblock, teams had to drive to the town of Sutton and find their next clue.
- Teams then had to drive to Bob's Farm and perform five goat yoga poses to receive their next clue, which directed them to the Pit Stop: Château Ste-Agnès. The Assist was hidden in one clue, found by Rebecca & Rebecca, and allowed them to perform two poses.

Additional note

- At the Blind Double Pass, EB & Blake used the Pass on Jesse & Jonathon, and Jesse & Jonathon used the Pass on Ika & Demetres.

=== Leg 7 (Quebec → Ontario) ===
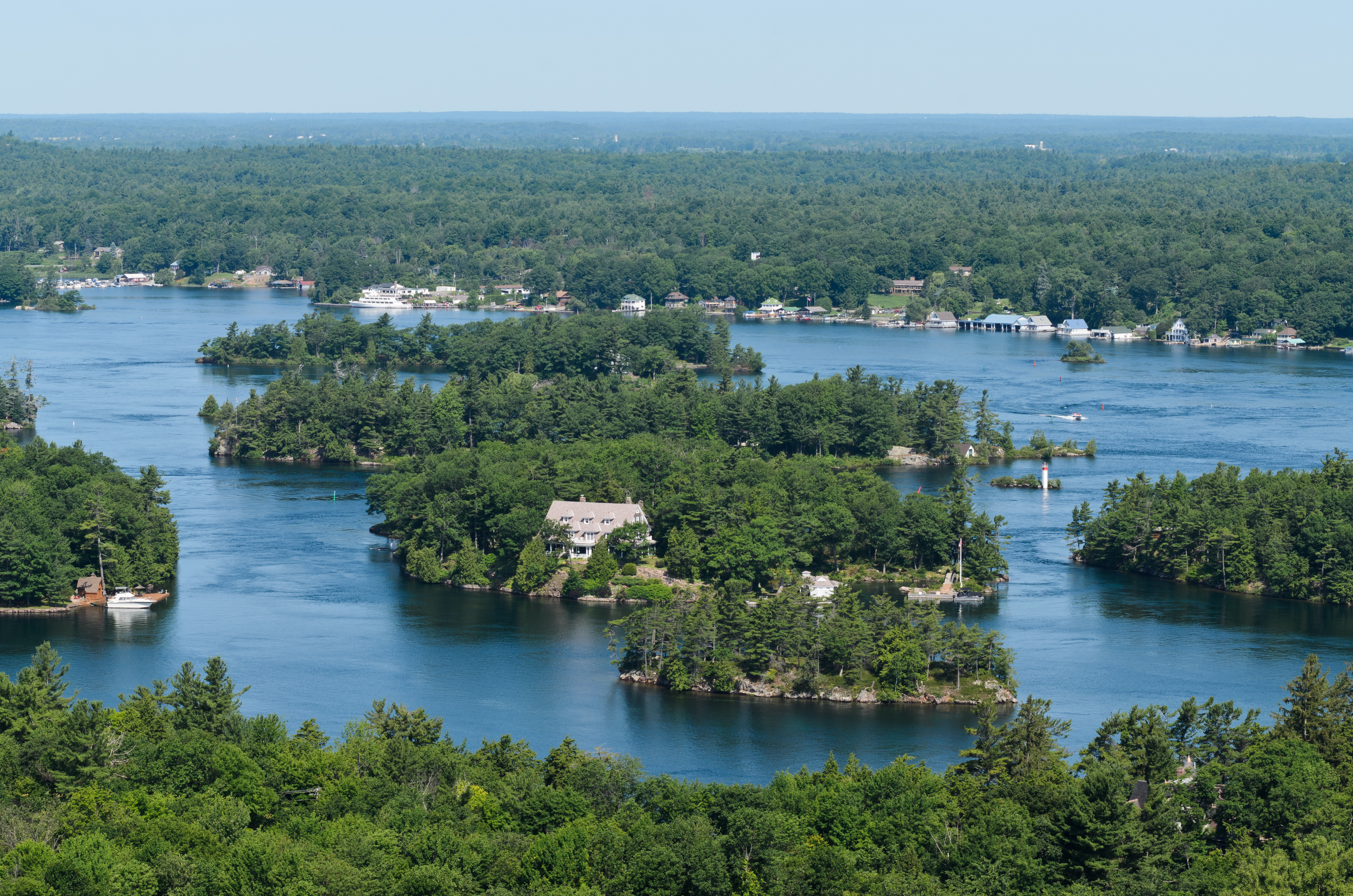
Teams finished the seventh leg among the Thousand Islands of the St. Lawrence River.

- Episode 7: "Cheer up Buttercup You're With a Donkey" (August 26, 2025)
- Prize: CA$10,000 and a trip for two to Lima, Peru (awarded to Grace & Joe)

Locations

- Sherbrooke (Hôtel de Ville) → Kingston, Ontario (Fort Henry National Historic Site)
- Kingston (Kingston Norman Rogers Airport – AOG Heliservices Inc.)
- Gananoque (Gananoque Town Hall)
- Gananoque (Laverne's Eatery)
- Lyndhurst (Berry Homestead Farm)
- Ivy Lea (City Cruises Dock) → St. Lawrence River (Thousand Islander III)

Episode summary

- At the start of this leg, teams were instructed to travel to Sherbrooke's city hall and sign up for one of two buses to Fort Henry in Kingston, Ontario. Once there, teams had to search the fort for two matching tokens, which they could exchange for their next clue. If teams found mismatched tokens, they had to trade with another team.
- The next morning, teams flew by helicopter to Kingston Norman Rogers Airport, where they had to perform a helicopter maintenance check for two helicopters to receive their next clue. Teams then had to drive to Gananoque Town Hall, where they had to listen to a recipe for Thousand Island dressing from a town crier. From the proclamation, teams had to memorize five locations, collect seven ingredients, and deliver them to Laverne's Eatery in exchange for their next clue.
- In this leg's Roadblock, one team member had to replicate a photograph by donning an outfit for themself and a donkey to receive their next clue.
- After the Roadblock, teams had to drive to the City Cruises dock in Ivy Lea and then take a boat to the Pit Stop: the Thousand Islander III passenger ship.

Additional note

- There was no elimination at the end of this leg; all teams were instead instructed to continue racing.

=== Leg 8 (Ontario → Quebec → Ontario) ===
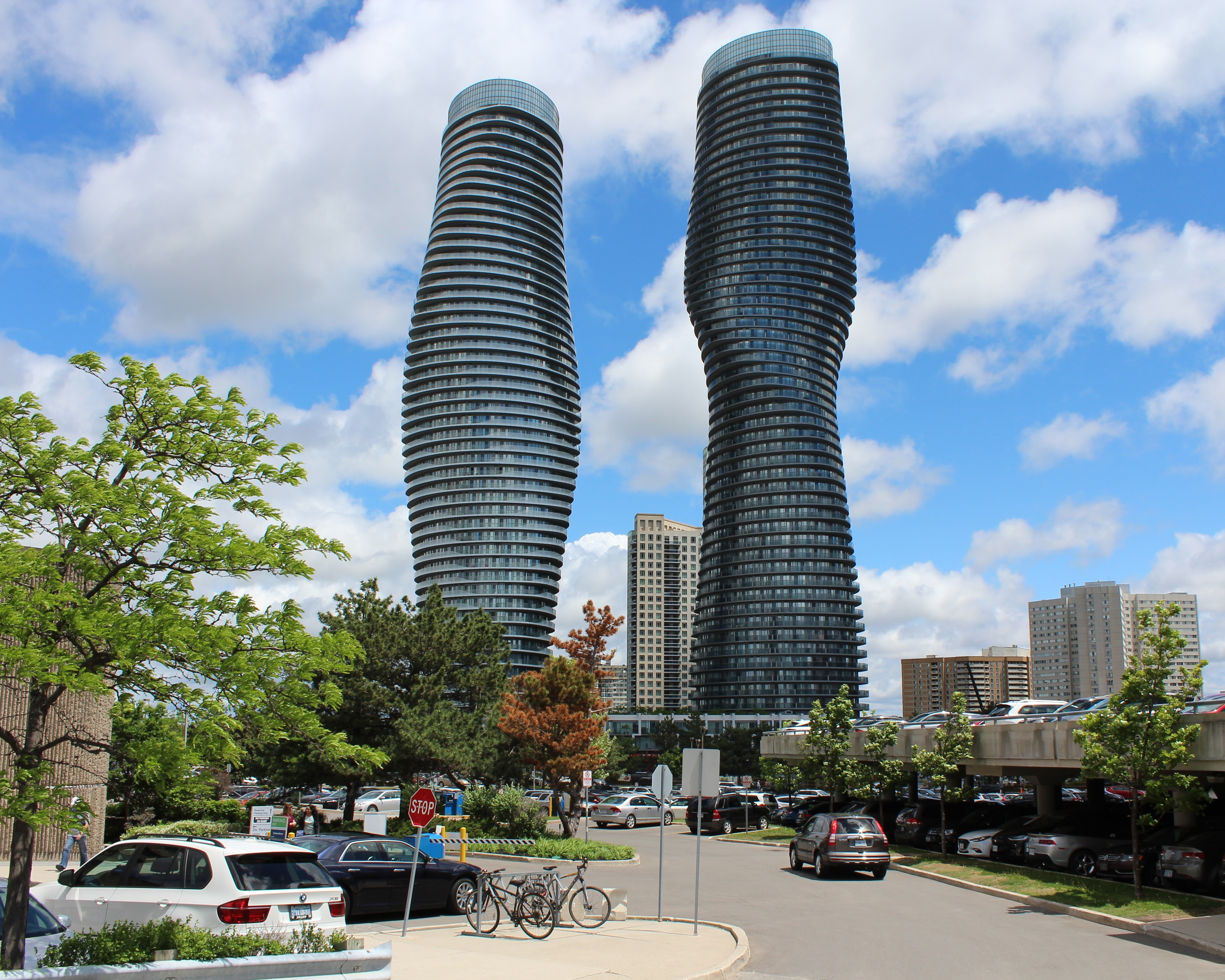
Racers had to ascend a wire between the towers of Absolute World during the Roadblock in Mississauga.

- Episode 8: "I'm Just Practicing Falling" (September 2, 2025)
- Prize: CA$10,000 and a trip for two to Florence, Italy (awarded to Grace & Joe)
- Eliminated: Lacey & Celia

Locations

- Front of Yonge (Treetop Trekking 1000 Islands)
- Montreal, Quebec → Toronto, Ontario
- Mississauga (Toronto Pearson International Airport – Lounge 15)
- Mississauga (Bell Mobility Headquarters)
- Mississauga (CJ's Skatepark)
- Mississauga (Absolute World)
- Mississauga (Ornge)
- Mississauga (JC Saddington Park)

Episode summary

- At the start of this leg, teams were instructed to drive to Treetop Trekking, traverse a ropes course, and search among 10 caches for Boost drinks with 13 specific nutrients before riding a zipline down to the U-Turn Vote. Teams then received their next clue and tickets for one of two flights to their next destination: Mississauga. After landing at Pearson airport, teams learned the U-Turn results before travelling to the Bell Mobility Headquarters, where they had to load a Chevrolet BrightDrop with boxes within the red lines to receive their next clue.
- This leg's Detour set at a recreated JACKALOPE festival was a choice between Roll it Up or Break it Down. In Roll it Up, teams had to ride a freestyle scooter through a skatepark within 75 seconds to receive their next clue. In Break it Down, teams had to perform a breakdance routine to receive their next clue.
- In this leg's Roadblock, one team member had to use an ascender to pull themself up a wire strung between the Absolute World towers over 170 meters above the ground before retrieving their next clue.
- After the Roadblock, teams had to travel to the training centre for Ornge, where they had to stabilize a simulated amputee patient. Teams had to apply a tourniquet, administer midazolam following a seizure, intubate the airway, and defibrillate the patient following cardiac arrest to receive their next clue, which directed them to the Pit Stop: JC Saddington Park.

Additional note

- Teams encountered a Blind U-Turn Vote. The teams' votes were as follows:

U-Turn Vote results
Team	Vote
EB & Blake	Jesse & Jonathan
Grace & Joe	EB & Blake
Ika & Demetres	Jesse & Jonathan
Jesse & Jonathon	EB & Blake
Lacey & Celia	Jesse & Jonathan
Nipîy & Magoo	EB & Blake

=== Leg 9 (Ontario → Newfoundland and Labrador) ===
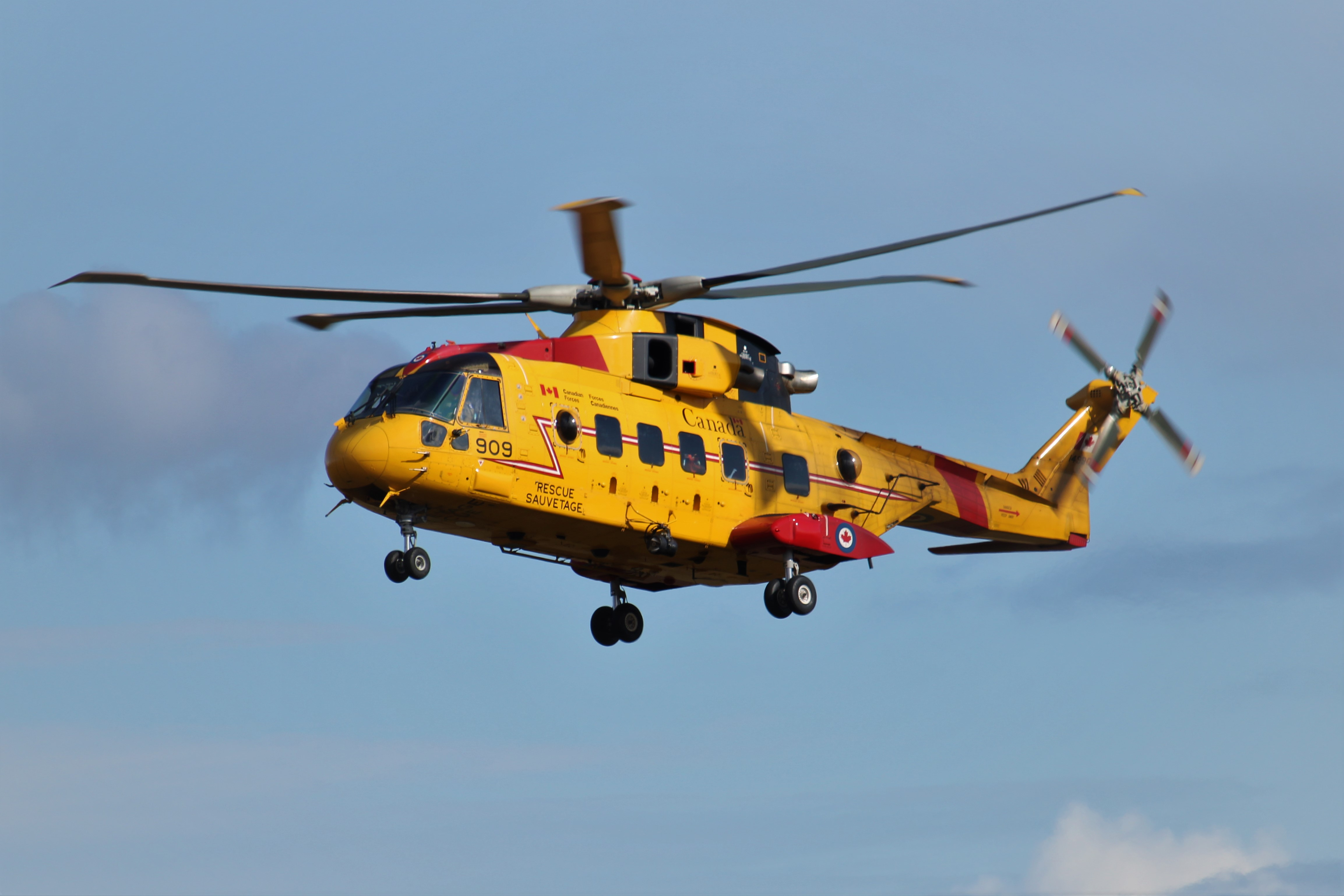
Once in Gander, racers had to jump out of a helicopter into Gander Lake for the Roadblock.

- Episode 9: "We're Full of Moose Farts" (September 9, 2025)
- Prize: CA$15,000 and a trip for two to Rio de Janeiro, Brazil (awarded to Nipîy & Magoo)
- Eliminated: Ika & Demetres

Locations

- Mississagua (Mississauga Celebration Square)
- Toronto → St. John's, Newfoundland and Labrador
- St. John's (Canadian Coast Guard Atlantic Region Headquarters – CCGS Henry Larsen)
- St. John's (Water Street)
- St. John's (Harbourside Park)
- St. John's → Gander (Gander Town Hall)
- Gander (CFB Gander & Gander Lake)
- Gander (Nav Canada Gander Control Centre)
- Gander (Rosie's Restaurant & Bakery)
- Gander (Gander International Airport)
- Gander (Cobb's Pond Rotary Park)

Episode summary

- At the start of this leg, teams were instructed to fly to St. John's, Newfoundland and Labrador. Once there, teams had to travel to the Canadian Coast Guard Atlantic Region Headquarters, which had their next clue. There, teams had to use binoculars to decode a set of nautical flags hung across the harbour that listed their next destination: Water Street. Teams then had to hand out Fuze drinks to 20 people and take a selfie with each person to receive their next clue and tickets for one of two buses to Gander at Harbourside Park. Once in Gander, teams found their next clue outside of town hall.
- In this leg's Roadblock, the team member who had yet to perform their sixth Roadblock had to jump out of an RCAF 103 Search and Rescue Squadron CH-149 Cormorant into Gander Lake and swim to their next clue.
- After the Roadblock, teams had to travel to the Nav Canada Gander Control Centre, where they had to work as an air traffic controller and manage the requests of three flights using proper phraseology to receive their next clue. Teams then had to travel to Rosie's Restaurant & Bakery and buy a tray of moose farts along with their next clue.
- This season's final Detour was a choice between Menu or Mosaic. In Menu, teams had to take food orders from five airport passengers, each of whom spoke a different language, and serve the correct food using a multilingual board to receive their next clue. In Mosaic, teams had to place ten granny squares in the correct spots on a replica backdrop for the local Come from Away production based on clues from locals to receive their next clue.
- After the Detour, teams had to check in at the Pit Stop: Cobb's Pond Rotary Park.

=== Leg 10 (Newfoundland and Labrador → Ontario) ===
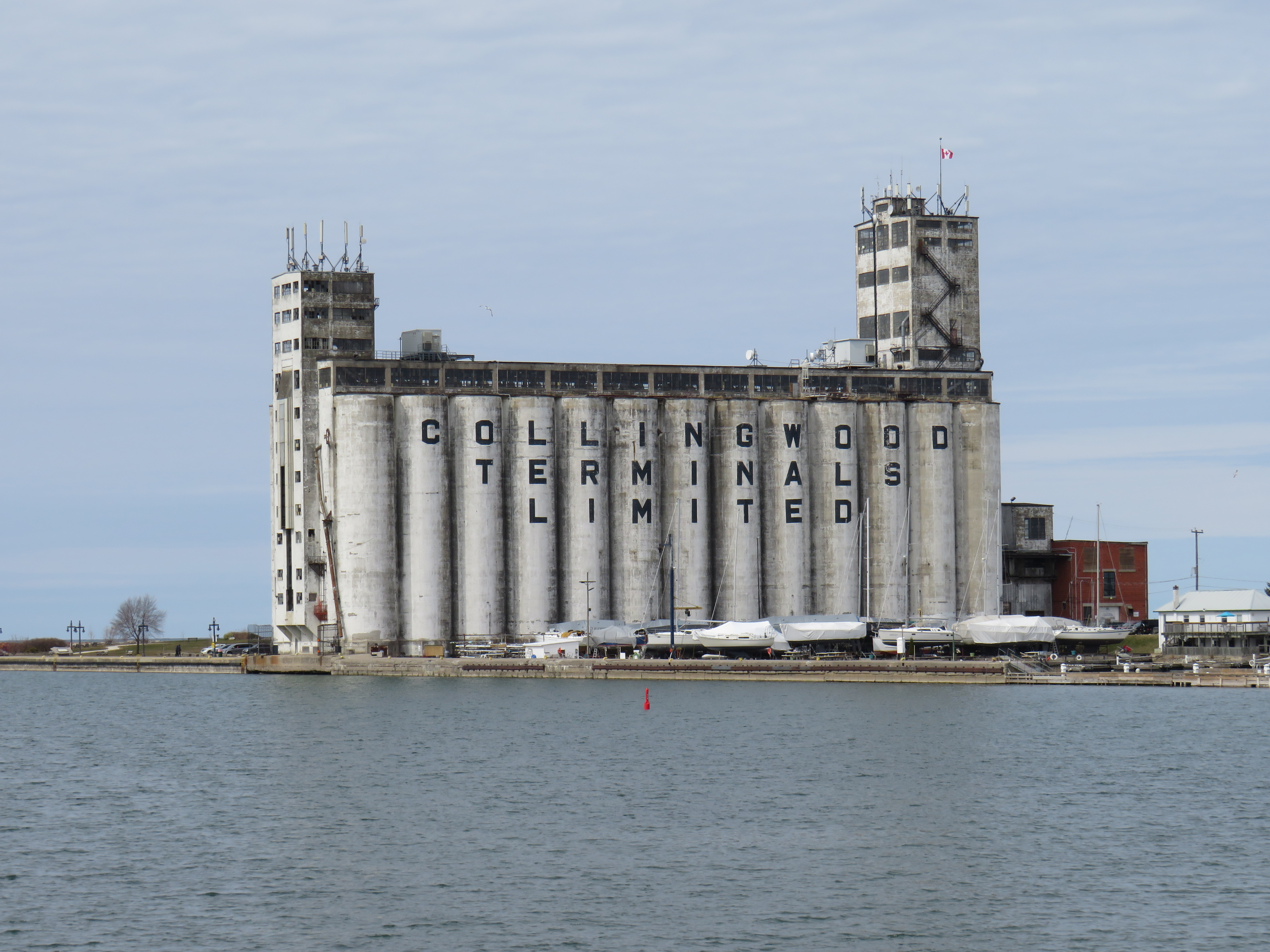
Teams faced the first ever Double Roadblock at the Collingwood Grain Terminals in Collingwood, Ontario.

- Episode 10: "Double Roadblock" (September 16, 2025)
- Prizes: A CA$250,000 cash payout, a trip for two around the world, and a 2025 Chevrolet Blazer EV SS for each team member
- Winners: Jesse & Jonathon
- Runners-up: Grace & Joe
- Third place: EB & Blake
- Fourth place: Nipîy & Magoo

Locations

- St. John's (Harbourside Park)
- St. John's → Toronto, Ontario
- Burlington (Burlington Executive Airport) → Collingwood (Collingwood Airport)
- Collingwood (Collingwood Grain Terminals)
- The Blue Mountains (Blue Mountain Village)
- The Blue Mountains (TK Ferri Orchards)
- The Blue Mountains (Northwinds Beach)
- The Blue Mountains (Valley Ridge Family Farm)
- The Blue Mountains (Osler Bluff Ski Club)

Episode summary

- At the start of this leg, teams were instructed to fly to Toronto, Ontario. Once there, teams had to sign up for one of two floatplanes to Collingwood.
- Teams encountered a Double Roadblock, where both team members had to individually complete a task.
  - One team member had to descend into the Collingwood Grain Terminals and find three sets of numbers paired with one specific shape written in invisible ink on the walls using a blacklight.
  - The other team member had to climb a ladder up the silos and retrieve three corresponding grain bags to receive their next clue.
- After the Double Roadblock, teams had to travel to Blue Mountain Village, where they had to deliver cupcakes and balloons to a birthday party using an aqua trike to receive their next clue. Teams then travelled to TK Ferri Orchards, where they had to bob for apples and collect eight apples with numbers that sum to 100 to receive their next clue.
- In this season's final Roadblock, one team member had to ride a jetboard through a course on Georgian Bay within 24 seconds to receive their next clue.
- After the second Roadblock, teams had to travel to Valley Ridge Family Farm. There, teams found 50 road signs, each of which represented a task on a previous leg, and had to hang them among ten posts in chronological order to receive their final clue, which directed them to the finish line: Osler Bluff Ski Club. The correct answers were:

Correct answers
Leg	Location	Signs & sources				
1	Edmonton, AB; Red Deer, AB	Seats First	Knot Line	156 Km Alberta	Don't Brake	Buckle Dance
1	Edmonton, AB; Red Deer, AB	Commonwealth Stadium search	Commonwealth Stadium rappel	Drive to Red Deer	Canyon Ski Resort	The Silver Buckle Roadblock
2	Lake Louise, AB; Golden, BC	Ice Break	Cowboy Post	Forest Red	Mountain Lift	Bridge Run
2	Lake Louise, AB; Golden, BC	Lake Louise Mountain Resort	Brewsters Stables Roadblock	Mount 7	Kicking Horse Mountain Resort	Golden Skybridge
3	Fraser Valley, BC	Canada Jumble	Music Window	Hockey Best Of	Eye Six	Ferris Wheel Team #
3	Fraser Valley, BC	Terry Fox Plaza	Martini Town	Abbotsford Centre Face Off	Specsavers	Cultus Lake Adventure Park
4	Inuvik, NT; Tuktoyaktuk, NT	Food Party	Dog Pull	Dish Station	Plane Ocean	Cat Hall
4	Inuvik, NT; Tuktoyaktuk, NT	Ingamo Hall Friendship Centre	Arctic Chalet Roadblock	Inuvik Satellite Station	Flight to Tuktoyaktuk	Kiti Hall
5	Prince George, BC	Tree Stump	Pass Double	School Map	Water Music	Hill Park
5	Prince George, BC	Ness Lake Forest Nursery	Double Pass	University of Northern British Columbia Detour	Prince George Aquatic Centre Roadblock	Connaught Hill Park
6	Eastern Townships, QC	Snowmobile Museum	Wellington Street	Don't Fall Points	Velodrome Blue Line	Goat Back
6	Eastern Townships, QC	J. Armand Bombardier Ingenuity Museum	Hôtel de Ville	O-Volt Face Off	Bromonte National Cycling Centre Roadblock	Bob's Farm
7	Thousand Islands, ON	Token Trade	Mechanical Redline	Crying Pick Up	Camera Dress	Boat Stop
7	Thousand Islands, ON	Fort Henry	AOG Heliservices Inc.	Gananoque Town Hall	Berry Homestead Farm	Thousand Islander III
8	Mississauga, ON	Carabiner 13	Plane Turn	Packing Space	Clue Box Tower	IV Bag Cuff
8	Mississauga, ON	Treetop Trekking 1000 Islands	Toronto Pearson International Airport U-Turn	Bell Mobility Headquarters	Absolute World Roadblock	Ornge
9	St. John's, NL; Gander, NL	Flag Supplies	Water Street	Radar Route	Moose Decision	Airport Switch
9	St. John's, NL; Gander, NL	Canadian Coast Guard Atlantic Region Headquarters	Water Street	Nav Canada Gander Control Centre	Rosie's Restaurant & Bakery	Gander International Airport Detour
10	Collingwood, ON; The Blue Mountains, ON	Flashlight Shape	Grain Silo Three	Apple Tree Add	Jetboard Course	Checkered Flag Go Go Go
10	Collingwood, ON; The Blue Mountains, ON	Collingwood Grain Terminals Double Roadblock	Collingwood Grain Terminals Double Roadblock	TK Ferri Orchards	Northwinds Beach Roadblock	Osler Bluff Ski Club

== Ratings ==
The eleventh season of The Amazing Race Canada had an average viewership of 1.3 million. The season was the most-viewed Canadian program on linear television for 2025.
