= Stan Edmonds =

Canadian make-up artist

- Born: December 24, 1960; Calgary, Alberta, Canada
- Education: Vancouver Film School (faculty)
- Years active: 1980–present
- Known for: Makeup artistry for film and television
- Notable work: Unforgiven, I, Robot, The Butterfly Effect, Scary Movie

Stan Edmonds (born December 24, 1960) has been a motion picture makeup artist for over 30 years. He has over 50 film and television credits and has served as head of department on such films as I, Robot, The Butterfly Effect, The Five People You Meet in Heaven, Scary Movie, and Clint Eastwood's Academy Award–winning film Unforgiven. Originally from Calgary, Alberta, Edmonds has worked across Canada and the United States and has worked with well-known actors, like Sylvester Stallone, Drew Barrymore, Anjelica Huston and Ashton Kutcher. He currently teaches makeup for film and television at the Vancouver Film School.

In November 2010 an Asian man in his early 20s from rural China managed to board an Air Canada flight to Vancouver disguised as an elderly white man. He took off his mask in the airplane's bathroom, and made a claim for refugee status upon landing in British Columbia. Edmonds was interviewed by several national news outlets for his professional opinion on how the disguise was accomplished.

== Filmography as makeup artist ==
- 2008 Chaos Theory (key makeup artist)
- 2007 Martian Child (key makeup artist)
- 2007 Wrong Turn 2: Dead End (video) (makeup designer)
- 2007 Hot Rod (key makeup artist)
- 2006 Scary Movie 4 (makeup artist: Anna Faris)
- 2006 Man About Town (makeup artist)
- 2005 Just Friends (key makeup artist)
- 2005 Are We There Yet? (makeup department head)
- 2004 The Five People You Meet in Heaven (TV movie) (makeup department head)
- 2004 I, Robot (makeup department head)
- 2004 The Butterfly Effect (key makeup artist)
- 2003 Good Boy! (makeup department head)
- 2003 The Core (key makeup artist)
- 2002 Living with the Dead (TV movie) (makeup department head)
- 2002 Snow Dogs (makeup artist)
- 2002 D-Tox (key makeup artist)
- 2001 Thir13en Ghosts (on-set key special makeup effects artist)
- 2001 Speaking of Sex (key makeup artist)
- 2001 Freddy Got Fingered (key makeup artist - as Stanley Edmonds)
- 2001 Along Came a Spider (makeup department head)
- 2001 Watchtower (makeup department head)
- 2000 Get Carter (key makeup artist)
- 2000 Scary Movie (key makeup artist, makeup department head - uncredited)
- 1999 The 13th Warrior (key makeup artist)
- 1999 Can of Worms (TV movie) (makeup department head)
- 1998 Mercy Point (TV series) (makeup department head)
- 1998 Futuresport (TV movie) (assistant makeup artist)
- 1998 I've Been Waiting for You (TV movie) (makeup department head)
- 1998 Goldrush: A Real Life Alaskan Adventure (TV movie) (makeup department head)
- 1996 To Brave Alaska (TV movie) (makeup department head)
- 1996 Two (TV series) (key makeup artist - 1 episode)
- 1996 Alaska (makeup artist)
- 1995 Far from Home: The Adventures of Yellow Dog (key makeup artist)
- 1992 Unforgiven (assistant make-up artist)
- 1992 Killer Image (makeup department head)
- 1991 Solitaire (makeup department head)
- 1990 Blood Clan (makeup consultant)
- 1989 Bye Bye Blues (makeup artist)
- 1989 Dead Bang (key makeup artist - uncredited)
- 1987 Storm (makeup department head)
- 1987 Stone Fox (TV movie) (makeup department head)
- 1986 Hyper Sapien: People from Another Star (makeup department head)
- 1980 Sequence (short) (makeup department head)
