= How It Ends (2018 film) =

- Film poster
- Directed by: David M. Rosenthal
- Written by: Brooks McLaren
- Produced by: Paul Schiff; Tai Duncan; Kelly McCormick; Patrick Newall
- Starring: Theo James; Forest Whitaker; Grace Dove; Nicole Ari Parker; Kat Graham; Mark O'Brien
- Cinematography: Peter Flinckenberg
- Edited by: Jason Ballantine
- Music by: Atli Örvarsson
- Production companies: Paul Schiff Productions; Sierra/Affinity
- Distributed by: Netflix
- Release date: July 13, 2018 (United States)
- Running time: 114 minutes
- Country: United States
- Language: English

How It Ends is a 2018 American action thriller film directed by David M. Rosenthal and written by Brooks McLaren. The film stars Theo James, Forest Whitaker, Grace Dove, Nicole Ari Parker, Kat Graham, and Mark O'Brien.

The film was released on July 13, 2018 by Netflix and received generally negative reviews.

== Plot ==
Will and Samantha (Sam) are a young couple expecting their first child. He flies from Seattle to visit her parents in Chicago, intending to ask her father Tom for permission to marry Sam. At dinner, Tom and Will get into an argument, and Will leaves without mentioning the pregnancy or wedding.

The next day, Sam calls Will before his flight back. She becomes scared when she hears a strange sound, and says, "Something's wrong," before the line goes dead. At the airport, all flights are cancelled. There is a TV news report discussing preliminary reports on a seismic event off the West Coast of the US that has disrupted electrical power and telecommunication. Will returns to Sam's parents', where Tom and Will agree to drive together to Seattle to find Sam.

Amidst heavy traffic, Will and Tom find soldiers have closed off the interstate. Invoking his prior service as a Marine officer, Tom persuades them to let his car through. That night, they are pulled over by a police car, but the driver is an escaped inmate from the local maximum security prison, armed with a shotgun. The ensuing firefight results in an accident that fractures Tom's ribs. Tom knocks him out, and they use the police cruiser to tow their damaged car to a nearby reservation.

At the reservation, mechanic Ricki fixes the car and agrees to travel with them in case they break down again. The trio set out, restocking provisions as they go. At one point, robbers hold the trio at gunpoint, stealing their gasoline reserves. Without fuel they are doomed, so Will chases and catches up with the fleeing car. Ricki shoots out their tires, causing the vehicle to flip over. With the surrounding fire and the crashed car's leaking gas tank, they barely have enough time to take their gasoline back before the car explodes. Later that night, upset over what happened, Ricki leaves them.

The next day Tom's lung collapses, so Will has to perform a needle thoracostomy. Sensing Tom will die without medical help, they bond, and Will finally feels that Tom approves of him and Sam. On a bridge, they encounter a gang of armed men on motorcycles. They work together to evade the gang, but Tom succumbs to his wounds. The car breaks down, and Will burns it so he does not have to leave Tom's body to rot. Will continues the journey on foot.

A family picks Will up, and he leads them to his estranged father's empty house in Idaho where they all rest. He strikes a deal with them, taking their four wheel drive vehicle in exchange for them staying at his father's well-stocked house until they are ready to go north, where the situation is supposedly better. As he gets closer to Seattle, Will sees that it is almost completely destroyed. The mystery thickens as Will notices dead victims buried in their cars under a thick layer of ash. Finally reaching Sam's devastated apartment, Will sees Sam's message for him, with an address to a cabin.

At the cabin, Will finds Sam with Jeremiah, a neighbor from the apartment building. Convinced the disaster is not natural but the result of an elaborate attack, Jeremiah reveals a deep paranoia. The next morning, he tries to kill Will, having fallen in love with Sam. Will shoots him in self-defense.

Soon after, a volcanic eruption triggers a massive burst of fire, ash and shockwaves, causing a pyroclastic flow. Will and Sam speed away from the all-engulfing cloud, barely staying ahead of it but managing to out-distance it as it subsides. They proclaim their love for one another, regardless of what happens next, as they, too, head north. The cause and nature of the original 'event' are unexplained.

== Cast ==
- Theo James as Will Younger, Sam’s boyfriend and an attorney
- Forest Whitaker as Tom Sutherland, Sam's father and Paula’s husband
- Kat Graham as Samantha “Sam” Sutherland, Will's girlfriend, Tom and Paula’s daughter
- Kerry Bishé as Meg, Will's and Sam's friend who lives in Ashland Heights
- Mark O'Brien as Jeremiah, Will's and Sam's neighbor
- Nicole Ari Parker as Paula Sutherland, Sam's mother and Tom’s wife
- Grace Dove as Ricki, an auto mechanic
- Eric Keenleyside as Sheriff Reynolds, the sheriff of Ashland Heights
- David Lewis as Wagoneer Man, a hitchhiker
- Lanie McAuley as Liza, the gas station robber

== Production ==
On March 19, 2011, it was announced that Sierra/Affinity was developing an action thriller film How It Ends based on the 2010 Black List script by Brooks McLaren, and it would be produced by Paul Schiff and Tai Duncan through Paul Schiff Productions. On December 1, 2015, David M. Rosenthal came on board to direct the film, while Sierra Pictures, which developed the project, would also produce the film and fully finance it. On January 4, 2017, Netflix acquired worldwide rights to the film. In June 2017, Theo James, Forest Whitaker, and Kat Graham were cast in the film. In September 2017, Mark O'Brien was cast in the film.

=== Filming ===
Principal photography took place in Winnipeg, Manitoba, Canada in August 2017.

== Release ==
The first full-length trailer was released by Netflix on June 22, 2018. The film was released on July 13, 2018.

== Reception ==
How It Ends received negative reviews. On review aggregator Rotten Tomatoes, the film holds an approval rating of 17%, based on 18 reviews, with an average rating of 3/10. Metacritic gives the film a weighted average score of 36 out of 100, based on 5 critics, indicating "generally unfavorable" reviews.
