= Vancouver Film School =

Film school in Vancouver, Canada

- Type: Private
- Established: 1987
- President: James Griffin
- Location: Vancouver, British Columbia, Canada

Vancouver Film School (VFS) is a private entertainment arts school located in Vancouver, British Columbia, Canada. Founded in 1987, it has achieved international recognition. The Vancouver Film School has campus locations around Downtown Vancouver and comprises six buildings. As part of the school's 20th anniversary in 2007, in August 2006 one million dollars was set aside in scholarships for new students. In March 2008, Vancouver Film School and YouTube launched a competition for three full-tuition scholarships for the creators of the three videos submitted and voted as favorites by the YouTube community.

== History ==
VFS opened in January 1987 with a single class of six film students and has steadily expanded since. In 2004 VFS opened its first international Admissions office in Mumbai, India and launched one of the first Game Design programs in North America. Recent milestones in the school's history include hosting the annual Game Design Expo in Vancouver, which began in January 2007, and partnering with YouTube to launch a 2008 scholarship competition for the creators of three videos submitted and voted upon by the YouTube community.

In 2018, VFS announced three 'Kevin Smith Scholarships' in Acting, Writing and Film Production covering full-tuition. Smith also funded thirteen partial-scholarships. Smith personally selected the recipients from over nine hundred applications. In February 2019, the school announced the 'Emily Bett Rickards Acting Scholarship', a partnership between VFS and Rickards, to fund a full scholarship for both of the school's acting programmes, as well as additional partial funding of $250,000 for other students. Rickards will also select the recipients. In May of the same year, VFS announced they would be supporting Vancouver-based Reality Curve Theatre in their off-Broadway production of Zayd Dohrn's Reborning, headlined by Rickards, to be performed at the SoHo Playhouse.

== Programs for Vancouver Film School ==
VFS offers one-year, hands-on production programs, including Film Production, 3D Animation & Visual Effects, Classical Animation, Acting for Film & Television, Digital Design, Entertainment Business Management, Foundation Visual Art & Design, Game Design, Makeup Design for Film & Television, Sound Design for Visual Media, and Writing for Film & Television. The school also runs a four-month Acting Essentials course and a 6-month Digital Character Animation program.

== Notable faculty ==
- Michael S. Baser, head of Writing for Film & Television – writer/producer whose credits include Good Times, Three's Company, The Jeffersons, and Maude.
- Mark Busse, instructor – founder & managing director of industrial brand, founder & host of CreativeMornings in Vancouver, author of "Design School Didn't Tell You..." column in Design Edge Magazine.
- Stan Edmonds, head of Makeup Design for Film & Television – key makeup artist on The Butterfly Effect, Get Carter, and Scary Movie, and makeup department head on I, Robot.
- Marv Newland, instructor – animator of the 1969 short Bambi Meets Godzilla.

== Notable alumni ==
- Magda Apanowicz – actor known for her roles as Andy Jensen on the TV series Kyle XY and Lacy Rand on Caprica.
- Shakun Batra – Bollywood director of Kapoor & Sons and Ek Main Aur Ekk Tu.
- Neill Blomkamp – Oscar nominated screenwriter and director of District 9.
- Anugrah Bohrey – writer of Best of Luck (2012 film) and Himmat Singh.
- Sara Canning – series regular (Seasons 1 and 2) on the television series The Vampire Diaries as well as numerous film and television credits.
- Peter Chao – comedian and YouTuber
- Colin Cunningham – actor in television and film on both sides of the border.
- Adam DiMarco – actor, best known for playing Albie Di Grasso on season two of The White Lotus.
- Grace Dove - First nations actress
- Hanna Hall – best known for her acting roles in Forrest Gump, The Virgin Suicides and the 2007 remake of Halloween.
- Dave Klein – cinematographer, best known for work with Kevin Smith.
- Avery Konrad – Canadian-born actress known for From and Sacred Lies.
- Neil Kopp – producer of Old Joy and director Gus Van Sant's 2007 film Paranoid Park for which Kopp won a 2008 Independent Spirit Award.
- John G. Lenic – TV producer and production manager best known for his work on Stargate SG-1, Stargate: Atlantis, and Stargate Universe.
- Seth Lochhead – writer of Hanna.
- Steve Lund – actor, best known for Schitt’s Creek, Haven and Bitten.
- Niall Matter – actor, best known for Primeval: New World and Eureka.
- Scott Mosier – film producer, editor, and cameo actor who produced the Academy Award-nominated documentary Salim Baba. He met Kevin Smith and cinematographer Dave Klein at VFS, and since graduating, the three have collaborated on the films in the View Askewniverse.
- Andrew Overtoom – Animation Director on SpongeBob SquarePants, for which he was nominated for Emmy Awards in 2004 and 2007.
- Pamela Rabe – Canadian-born actress known for Sirens, Cosi, Paradise Road, and Wentworth.
- Emily Bett Rickards – actress best known for her role as Felicity Smoak on Arrow.
- Stacey Roy – actor, new media producer known for LEGO Masters and The Nerdy Bartender
- Manmord Sidhu – Bollywood producer, director & distributor. He formed a production and distribution company named White Hill Production & White Hill Music.
- Kevin Smith – director of Clerks, Mallrats, Chasing Amy, Dogma, Jay and Silent Bob Strike Back, Jersey Girl and Clerks II; Smith dropped out in 1993 and was presented with an honorary diploma in 2005.
- Tara Spencer-Nairn – actor in Corner Gas.
- Jewel Staite – Canadian-born actress famous for her work on Joss Whedon's Firefly, and Stargate: Atlantis.
- Emilie Ullerup – actor in Sanctuary.

== See also ==
- Film
- Glossary of motion picture terms
- Higher education in British Columbia
