= David M. Rosenthal (director) =

American filmmaker (born 1969)

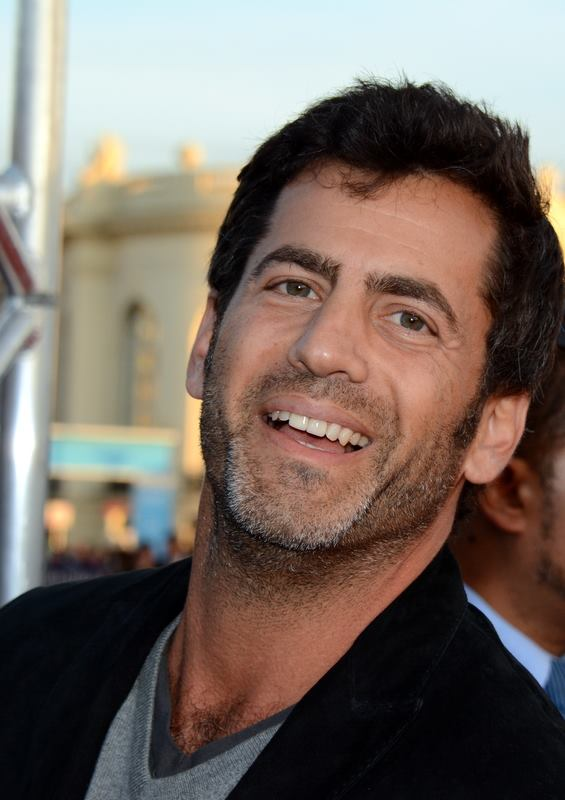
- Rosenthal in 2013
- Born: David Mitchell Rosenthal; March 23, 1969 (age 55); New York City, New York, U.S.
- Occupations: Film director; screenwriter; film producer

David Mitchell Rosenthal (born March 23, 1969) is an American screenwriter, film director, and producer. He has directed the films A Single Shot, How It Ends, Janie Jones, and The Perfect Guy, among others.

== Filmography ==
- See This Movie (2004)
- Falling Up (2009)
- Janie Jones (2010)
- A Single Shot (2013)
- The Perfect Guy (2015)
- How It Ends (2018)
- Jacob's Ladder (2019)
- No Limit (2022)
