= Seth Lochhead =

Canadian screenwriter (born 1981)

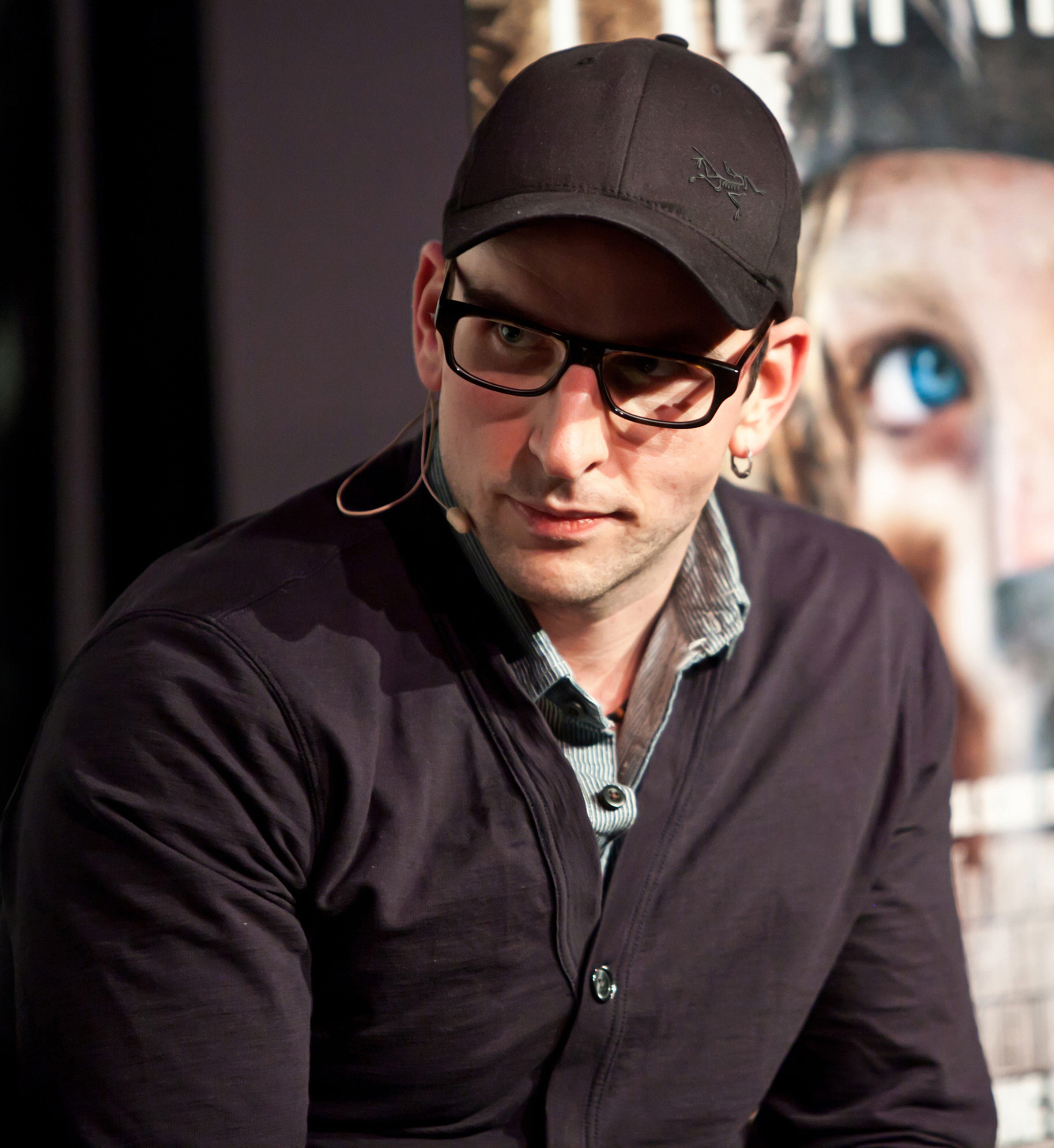
- Seth Lochhead Visits Vancouver Film School, in April 2011
- Born: August 17, 1981 (age 45); Nanaimo, British Columbia, Canada
- Occupation: Screenwriter
- Writing career
- Language: English
- Notable work: Hanna (2011)

Seth Lochhead (born August 17, 1981) is a Canadian screenwriter. He is best known for co-writing the 2011 film Hanna with David Farr.

== Career ==
Lochhead attended Vancouver Film School's Writing for Film & Television program, where he wrote his first screenplay, Hanna, while he was in his early 20s. He completed the script after leaving film school and in 2006 it was listed on the Hollywood Black List of the best unproduced scripts in Hollywood. Lochhead sold the screenplay to Focus Features in March 2007, although he received a much higher bid from another American production company.

Hanna was directed by Joe Wright and released in 2011 after being in development for a total of six years. Lochhead shared the writing credit with David Farr, a British writer and theatre director, who wrote another draft of the film during its development (whom Lochhead does not personally know). Before Hanna had been produced, Lochhead was approached to pitch himself as a writer for Sherlock Holmes: A Game of Shadows and a film adaptation of the Masters of the Universe series featuring He-Man.

He has written several screenplays since Hanna, including Cadar, which was sold to Spitfire Pictures, Tin Man for Rumble, and Governess, which was picked up by Warner Bros. with Michael Bay as a producer. In 2013, it was announced Lochhead had been chosen to write a film adaption of Shadow of the Colossus. That same year, he was attached to adapt Karen Thompson Walker's The Age of Miracles for director Catherine Hardwicke. Lochhead had also been attached to adapt the graphic novel Who is Jakes Ellis? for David Yates, at 20th Century Fox, but by 2016 both had exited the project.

== Personal life ==
Lochhead currently lives in Vancouver with his girlfriend. In a 2011 interview, Lochhead said he had considered becoming a film director in addition to screenwriting, as well as relocating to Los Angeles.

His mother is a feminist and his father is a skilled fisherman and carpenter; Lochhead has said they both influenced his self-sufficiency.
