= Hanna (film) =

2011 film by Joe Wright

- Theatrical release poster
- Directed by: Joe Wright
- Screenplay by: Seth Lochhead; David Farr
- Story by: Seth Lochhead
- Produced by: Leslie Holleran; Marty Adelstein; Scott Nemes
- Starring: Saoirse Ronan; Eric Bana; Tom Hollander; Olivia Williams; Jason Flemyng; Cate Blanchett
- Cinematography: Alwin Küchler
- Edited by: Paul Tothill
- Music by: The Chemical Brothers
- Production companies: Holleran Company; Babelsberg Studio
- Distributed by: Focus Features (United States); Universal Pictures (United Kingdom); Sony Pictures Releasing International (Germany)
- Release dates: 8 April 2011 (United States); 6 May 2011 (United Kingdom); 26 May 2011 (Germany)
- Running time: 111 minutes
- Countries: Germany; United Kingdom; United States
- Language: English
- Budget: $30 million
- Box office: $65.3 million

Hanna is a 2011 action thriller film directed by Joe Wright. The film stars Saoirse Ronan as the title character, a girl raised in the wilderness of northern Finland by her father, an ex-CIA operative (Eric Bana), who trains her as an assassin. Cate Blanchett portrays a senior CIA agent who tries to track down and eliminate the girl and her father. The soundtrack was written by the Chemical Brothers.

Hanna was released in North America in April 2011 and in Europe in May 2011. It received positive reviews from critics with praise for the performances of Ronan, Bana and Blanchett as well as the action sequences and themes.

== Plot ==
Hanna Heller is a fifteen-year-old girl who lives with her father, Erik, in rural northern Finland. Since the age of two, Hanna has been trained by him, an ex-CIA operative from Germany, to be a skilled assassin. He teaches her hand-to-hand combat and drills her in target shooting. Erik knows a secret that cannot become public and Marissa Wiegler, a senior CIA officer, seeks to eliminate him.

Erik has trained Hanna with the intent to kill Marissa. One night, she tells him she is "ready" to face their enemies. Erik digs up a radio beacon that will alert the CIA to their presence. Although he warns Hanna that a confrontation with Marissa will be fatal for either her or Marissa, he leaves the final decision to her and she activates the beacon. Erik leaves, instructing her to meet him in Berlin.

Hanna is seized by special forces and taken to an underground CIA complex where a suspicious Marissa sends a decoy to interrogate Hanna when she asks for her by name. While talking to the double, Hanna starts to cry and embraces her tightly, which makes her captors uneasy. They send guards to sedate her.

As they enter the cell, Hanna kills the double along with some guards and escapes, discovering that she is in Morocco. Hanna meets Sebastian and Rachel, who are on a camper-van holiday with their children, Sophie and Miles, and stows away in the vehicle on a ferry to Spain, seeking to reach Berlin. The family is kind to her, and she and Sophie become friends: Hanna even tells her about the Berlin rendezvous and they kiss.

Marissa hires Isaacs, a sadistic former agent, to capture Hanna while other agents are searching for Erik. She kills Hanna's maternal grandmother after failing to learn anything useful from her. Isaacs has discovered from the Moroccan hotelier with whom Hanna escaped and trails them. Cornering her and the family sometime down the road, Isaacs attacks but Hanna manages to escape after a vicious fight.

Marissa interrogates the family and discovers from Miles that Hanna is heading to Berlin. The family do not reappear. Meanwhile, in Berlin, Erik fights off an attempted assassination and tries but fails to kill Marissa.

Arriving at the rendezvous in an abandoned Berlin amusement park, Hanna meets Knepfler, an eccentric magician and friend of Erik's who lives there. Before Erik arrives, Marissa and Isaacs appear. Hanna escapes, but overhears comments that suggest Erik is not her biological father.

Hanna then goes to her grandmother's empty apartment where she finds Erik, who admits he is not her biological father but loves her as his own. He explains that he once recruited pregnant women into a CIA program where their children's DNA was enhanced to create super-soldiers. After the project was shut down, its subjects – all except Hanna – were eliminated.

Marissa and Isaacs arrive; Erik acts as a distraction to allow Hanna to escape. He kills Isaacs, but is shot dead by Marissa, who then returns to Knepfler's house in the abandoned amusement park and finds Hanna, who has just discovered Knepfler hanging dead upside-down, tortured to death by Isaacs. Hanna flees, taking one of the arrows used to kill Knepfler.

After Hanna flees, she is cornered by Marissa. In a final confrontation, Hanna turns her back to Marissa, who shoots at her, but Hanna wounds Marissa by shooting an arrow at her. A now-staggering Marissa, pursued by Hanna, trips, leaving her badly injured. Hanna picks up Marissa's gun and uses it to kill her with two shots — a method she had previously used while hunting a deer at the film's beginning.

== Cast ==
- Saoirse Ronan as Hanna
- Eric Bana as Erik Heller
- Vicky Krieps as Johanna Zadek
- Cate Blanchett as Marissa Wiegler
- John Macmillan as Lewis
- Tim Beckmann as Walt
- Paul Birchard as Bob
- Jamie Beamish as Burton
- Michelle Dockery as False Marissa
- Jessica Barden as Sophie
- Aldo Maland as Miles
- Olivia Williams as Rachel
- Jason Flemyng as Sebastian
- Mohamed Majd as Moroccan Hotel Owner
- Tom Hollander as Isaacs
- Sebastian Hülk as Titch
- Joel Basman as Razor
- Álvaro Cervantes as Feliciano
- Martin Wuttke as Knepfler
- Gudrun Ritter as Katrin Zadek

== Production ==
The film was co-produced by the American Holleran Company and German Studio Babelsberg, with financial support from various German film funds and the main distributor, Focus Features, which holds the copyright to the film.

=== Development ===
The film's story and script were written by Seth Lochhead while a student at Vancouver Film School. He wrote the original story and script on spec, and finalized the script in 2006, with David Farr providing later changes.

Danny Boyle and Alfonso Cuarón were previously attached to direct the film, before it was confirmed that Joe Wright would direct, after Ronan prompted the producers to consider him.

=== Filming ===
Most of the filming was done at Studio Babelsberg in Potsdam, but locations also included Lake Kitkajärvi in Kuusamo, Finland, several German locations (including Bad Tölz, the water bridge at Magdeburg, Köhlbrandbrücke and Reeperbahn in Hamburg, and various sites in Berlin, such as Kottbusser Tor, Görlitzer Bahnhof and Spreepark), as well as Ouarzazate and Essaouira in Morocco. Temperatures during the Finland shoot sometimes fell as low as −33 °C (−27 °F), but Ronan said "Finland did bring out the fairy tale aspects of the story. We were shooting on a frozen lake, surrounded by pine trees covered in snow".

== Themes and motifs ==
Reviewers remarked that the setting and style of Hanna significantly depart from a typical action movie. According to the official website, the film has "elements of dark fairy tales" woven into an "adventure thriller". Joe Wright, the director, has said that the movie's theme is a "fantasy" about "overcoming the dark side" during the "rites of passage" of adolescent maturation when a child transforms and "has to go into the world". He said that he was influenced by personal exposure every day as he grew up to "violent, dark, cautionary fairy tales" that "prepare children for the future obstacles in the wider world", as well as his "deep love for the mystical qualities of David Lynch movies", by the patterns of narrative that he prefers because of his dyslexia, and by working as a child in his parents' puppetry company.

In an interview with Film School Rejects, Wright acknowledged David Lynch as a major influence on Hanna and also pointed to the Chemical Brothers' score: "You can expect an extraordinarily loud, thumping, deeply funky score that will not disappoint". The music, including the tracks "The Devil Is In The Beats" and "The Devil Is In The Details", underscores the movie's style, recalling Stanley Kubrick's A Clockwork Orange with musical motifs consistent with Wright's "fairy tale theme" of childhood innocence confronting the modern "synthetic" world. Several reviewers have commented that the movie has a hyper-stylized Kubrickian tone, reminiscent of A Clockwork Orange. The "Kubrick-esque" style includes Isaacs' "gleeful sadism... at times darkly comedic," a whistling villain reminiscent of Alex DeLarge. Joe Wright's "love of fairy tales and David Lynch movies" was seen as blending A Clockwork Orange and the work of the Brothers Grimm.

Richard Roeper judged it to be a "surreal fairy tale" with "omnipresent symbolism". Matt Goldberg said it was "an effective and surreal dark fairy tale"... ..."with a dreamlike sensibility... ...Everything in the picture is slightly askew and provides immediacy to Hanna’s offbeat coming-of-age tale... ...a film that refuses to exist solely in the realm of reality or fairy tale... ...'gritty' realism simply isn’t worthy of the story he’s trying to tell." Fairy tale motifs are strewn through the film. In the "tightly-edited patchwork of visual iconography, allusion and symbolism" Wiegler is equated with the Big Bad Wolf or the queen in Snow White. "Classic fairy tale movie tropes abound;" for example, the camera spins in obvious circles as Hanna makes her escape from the underground government facility early in the film, "just as the young heroine’s world is spinning out of control." Peter Bradshaw found the fairy tale mythology "unsubtle". Conversely, some reviewers did not comment on the fairy tale elements, and others did so with expressive reservation.

Kyle Munkittrick of Discover magazine notes that Hanna is a "transhumanist hero". Despite being genetically engineered to have "high intelligence, muscle mass, and no pity", she is still a good-natured person. He says Hanna "symbolizes the contest between genetics and environment", or, "perhaps more familiarly, nature versus nurture".

== Reception ==
=== Critical response ===
On review aggregator website Rotten Tomatoes the film holds an approval rating of 71% based on 238 reviews, with an average rating of 6.8/10. The site's critical consensus states: "Fantastic acting and crisply choreographed action sequences propel this unique, cool take on the revenge thriller." Metacritic assigned the film a weighted average score of 65 out of 100 based on 40 critics, indicating "generally favorable" reviews. Audiences polled by CinemaScore gave the film an average grade of "C+" on an A+ to F scale.

Justin Chang of Variety said that Hanna is "an exuberantly crafted chase thriller that pulses with energy from its adrenaline-pumping first minutes to its muted bang of a finish". Roger Ebert gave the film three and a half stars out of four, commenting "Wright combines his two genres into a stylish exercise that perversely includes some sentiment and insight".

Peter Bradshaw of The Guardian, on the other hand, gave the film two stars out of five, stating "With its wicked-witch performance from Cate Blanchett, its derivative premise, its bland Europudding location work and some frankly outrageous boredom, this will test everyone's patience." Kenneth Turan, of the Los Angeles Times, stated that the film "starts off like a house afire but soon burns itself out", adding that even though the film is "[b]lessed with considerable virtues, including a clever concept, crackling filmmaking and a charismatic star, it ultimately squanders all of them, undone by an unfortunate lack of subtlety and restraint".

=== Box office ===
In its opening weekend, Hanna came in second place at the U.S. box office behind Hop with $12.4 million. When the film closed on 7 July 2011, it had grossed $40.3 million in North America and $25.1 million in other territories, for a worldwide total of $65.3 million.

=== Accolades ===
Award	Category	Recipient(s)	Result	Ref.
Alliance of Women Film Journalists	Best Film Music or Score	The Chemical Brothers	Won	
Alliance of Women Film Journalists	Kick Ass Award for Best Female Action Star	Saoirse Ronan	Nominated	
Chicago Film Critics Association	Best Original Score	Ed Simons, Tom Rowlands (The Chemical Brothers)	Nominated	
Cinema Audio Society	Outstanding Achievement in Sound Mixing for Motion Pictures	Roland Winke (production mixer), Christopher Scarabosio, Craig Berkey (re-recording mixers), Andrew Dudman (scoring mixer)	Nominated	
Critics' Choice Movie Awards	Best Action Movie	Hanna	Nominated	
Critics' Choice Movie Awards	Best Young Performer	Saoirse Ronan	Nominated	
Empire Awards	Best Thriller	Hanna	Nominated	
International Cinephile Society	Best Original Score	The Chemical Brothers	Nominated	
International Film Music Critics Association	Breakout Composer of the Year	The Chemical Brothers	Nominated	
Irish Film & Television Academy	Best Actress – Film	Saoirse Ronan	Won	
London Film Critics' Circle	Young British Performer of the Year	Saoirse Ronan	Nominated	
Los Angeles Film Critics Association	Best Music	Tom Rowlands, Ed Simons (The Chemical Brothers)	Won	
MTV Movie Awards	Best Music	The Chemical Brothers (for "The Devil Is in the Details")	Nominated	
Saturn Awards	Best Performance by a Younger Actor	Saoirse Ronan	Nominated	
Scream Awards	Best Thriller	Hanna	Nominated	
St. Louis Film Critics Association	Best Actress	Saoirse Ronan	Nominated	
St. Louis Film Critics Association	Best Supporting Actress	Cate Blanchett	Nominated	
St. Louis Film Critics Association	Best Original Screenplay	Seth Lochhead, David Farr	Nominated	
St. Louis Film Critics Association	Best Scene	Hanna (Hanna's escape from captivity sequence)	Nominated	
World Soundtrack Academy	Discovery of the Year	Tom Rowlands, Ed Simons (The Chemical Brothers)	Nominated	
Young Artist Award	Best Performance in a Feature Film – Leading Young Actress	Saoirse Ronan	Nominated	

== Soundtrack ==
The soundtrack album features a score composed by the British big beat duo, the Chemical Brothers.

== TV series ==
In March 2017, David Farr announced that he would be writing a TV series based on the film. On May 23, 2017, Amazon officially ordered the series to production. The first episode was made available on Amazon Video as a time-limited preview on February 3, 2019. The full eight-episode first season was released on March 29, 2019. In April 2019, Amazon renewed the series for a second season which premiered July 3, 2020. In July 2020, the series was renewed for a third season which premiered November 24, 2021.
