= Kelly Road Secondary School =

Shas Ti Kelly Road Secondary

Location
- 7405 Kelly Road; Prince George, British Columbia, V2K 2H4; Canada; 53.99686°N 122.80369°W

Information
- School type: Public, high school
- Principal: Chris Molcak
- Staff: 70
- Grades: 8-12
- Enrollment: 850 (September 05, 2019)
- Language: English
- Area: Hart Highland and Hart Highway area
- Colours: Green and Blue
- Mascot: Grizzly Bear
- Team name: Grizzlies
- Website: stkrweb.sd57.bc.ca

Shas Ti Kelly Road Secondary is a public high school in Prince George, British Columbia, part of School District 57 Prince George.

The school was first named in recognition of its location on Kelly Road. Kelly Road in turn was named after John Kelly, who was a pioneer that purchased all the land for timber and development. He built the road that now bears his name and developed much of the area; he also had a watch and jewelry shop in downtown Prince George.

In 2020, the board of trustees voted to adopt a dual name and name "Shas Ti Secondary" was adopted. Recently, the school has combined those two names into "Shas Ti Kelly Road Secondary School." Shas Ti is Dakelh and means "Grizzly Trail." The Lheidli T'enneh suggested this name as the area of the Hart Highway was once known to be an area populated heavily by grizzly bears.

Shas Ti Kelly Road Secondary School opened in a new building in August 2020. Due to the old building getting demolished.
