= Endurance game =

Game played under stress

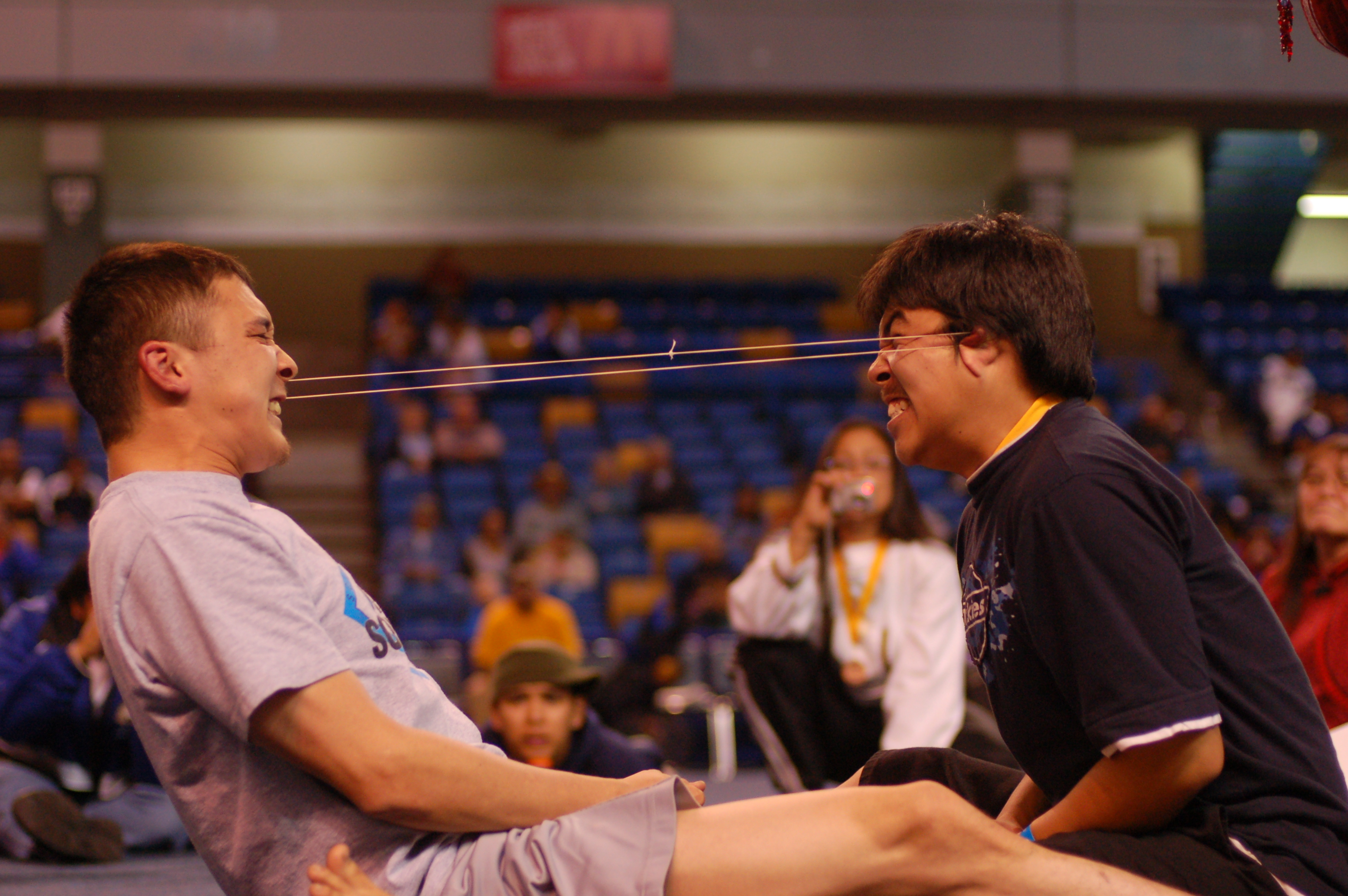
World Eskimo Indian Olympics (2008): A traditional Inuit sport in which the ears are used to pull until one submits.

An endurance game is a game where the object is to last as long as possible under some sort of stress. The stress might be physical pain, fear, social embarrassment or any other negative sensation.

The important distinguishing feature of endurance games is that the object is to outlast one's opponents, rather than outdo them in any test of skill. Endurance games are a feature of hazing rituals in institutions where hazing is common.

One playing an endurance game grants consent to other players' possible harm to oneself. One child justified hurting others during games which require one to do so, saying, "If they know the game then they know what's going to happen."

Among the Inuit, endurance games, "stress the body and test the limits of the individual's psychological and physical endurance," thereby helping, along with other games, to, "prepare children for the rigors of the arctic environment by stressing hand-eye coordination, problem solving, and physical strength and endurance."

== Examples ==
=== Ethnic games ===
- Ear pulling, an Inuit sport

=== Electric games ===
- PainStation
- Shocking Duel

== Television ==
There have been a number of game shows or reality shows which have included tests of endurance. This style of game show was pioneered in Japan such as Za Gaman — "The Endurance" — and there are now several British and American shows which test the contestants in this way.

- Balls of Steel
- Banzai
- Distraction
- Fear Factor
- I'm a Celebrity...Get Me Out of Here!
- Survivor
- Touch the Truck
- Za Gaman

== Film ==
In Never Say Never Again, James Bond is successful in defeating Maximillian Largo at an electric shock arcade game, Domination, similar to Shocking Duel, so he can pass word to Largo's mistress Domino Petachi that her brother Jack was murdered.

== See also ==
- Endurance training
