= Veronica McDonald =

Canadian athlete and coach (born 1995)

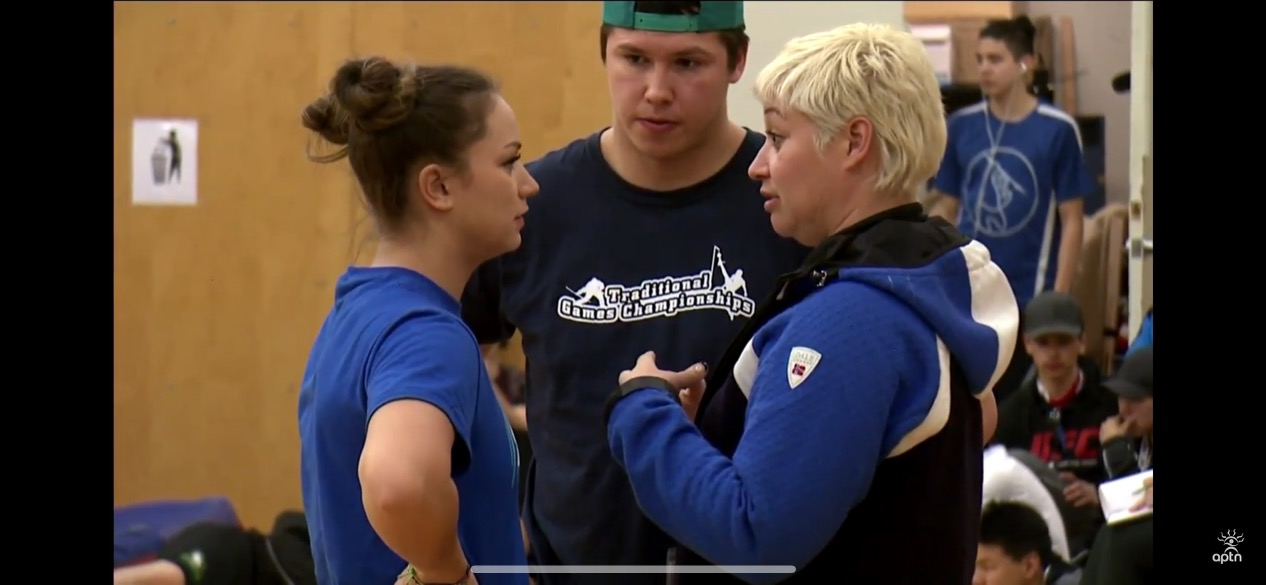
Veronica McDonald discusses Arctic Sports strategy with her mother and coach, Meika McDonald

Veronica McDonald (born in 1995), participated in Arctic Sports competitions from a young age, and has been a coach in these traditional Indigenous sports. A member of the Athabasca Chipewyan First Nation in Alberta, Canada, McDonald lives in Yellowknife, Northwest Territories. She holds two Arctic Winter Games records in kneel jump and triple jump, was a recipient of the Sport North Federation's Junior Female Athlete in 2018, and won both Junior (2012) and All-Around Open Senior Female Athlete in Arctic Sports (2014, 2018) at the Arctic Winter Games.

== Early life ==
McDonald was born on January 17, 1995, and grew up in Fort Smith Northwest Territories. Her mother, Meika McDonald, is a decorated Arctic Sports athlete, holding several records in Arctic Sports while winning 34 medals participating in 10 Arctic Winter Games. McDonald credits her grandfather, Tim McDonald as her first coach; he also coached her mother from a young age. McDonald identifies her mom as her role model: "I watched my mom in the 2000 Arctic Winter Games ... and everybody cheered for her and that immediately got my attention," she said. "I was like, 'I want to be like my mom." McDonald worked for the Northwest Territories government from 2016-2020 as a student case officer providing financial assistance.

== Career ==
=== Athletics ===
McDonald participated in Arctic Sports at the Arctic Winter Games seven times (2004, 2006, 2008, 2010, 2012, 2014, 2018), winning 28 medals beginning when she was 9 years old. She also holds two records at the Arctic Winter Games, in junior women’s (17 and under) kneel jump (132.4 cm/4' 4 1/8") (2012) and women’s open triple jump event (8.61 m/28' 3") (2018). She won awards as both the all-around Junior Female Athlete in Arctic Sports (2012) and the all-Around Open female athlete in Arctic Sports (2014, 2018). In 2014, she received the Junior Female Athlete Award from the Sport North Federation. She was selected to be the final torchbearer for the opening ceremony at the 2018 Games. She attended the 2018 World Eskimo-Indian Olympics in Fairbanks, Alaska, the largest traditional sports gathering north of the 60th parallel. While there, she competed in 12 events, and garnered 5 medals - four gold and one bronze. She received gold in the two-foot high kick, Alaskan high kick (a personal best of 6'), kneel jump (54' 0.25") and scissor broad jump (26' 8.5"), an event she had not competed in beforehand. Her bronze medal came in another event she competed in for the first time, blanket toss.

=== Coaching ===
McDonald formally established the Yellowknife Arctic Sports Club in 2019 to coach athletes although she'd already coached other athletes for many years in keeping with the philosophy of Arctic sports, as she explains: “In these games you are taught to offer encouragement and to help others.” She described the spirit of her club as "fun, accessible, and supportive. 'It's not something where you want to beat somebody,' she said. 'You want to help that person achieve their next goal just as much as you want to.'" In her role as a Traditional Games Instructor with the Aboriginal Sports Circle of the Northwest Territories McDonald has been training each instructor who has gone through the program since it began. She also officiates regularly at the Traditional Games Championships.

== Awards ==
She received the Sport North Federation's Junior Female Athlete in 2018, and the National Indigenous Coaching Award in 2020.
