= Meika McDonald =

Canadian athlete (born 1974)

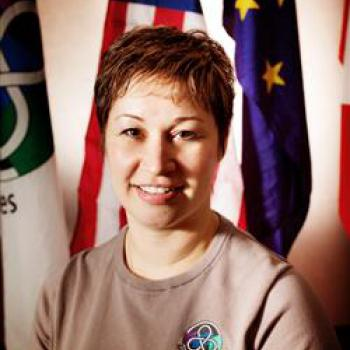
Photo of Meika McDonald from the Sport North Federation.

Meika McDonald (born 1974), a member of the Athabasca Chipewyan First Nation living in Fort Smith Northwest Territories has won 34 medals while participating in Arctic Sports competitions over ten Arctic Winter Games (1998–2006). She set three Arctic Winter Games records in Alaskan high kick (both junior and open women's) and triple jump (open women's). McDonald was a recipient of the Sport North Federation's Mary Beth Miller Memorial Senior Female Athlete of the Year in 1998. She became a director for the Arctic Winter Games International Committee in 2007, and was inducted into the NWT Sport Hall of Fame in 2015 for her athletic accomplishments in Arctic Sports. She was awarded the Governor General's Meritorious Service Medal in 2017.

== Personal life ==
McDonald has lived her life in Fort Smith Northwest Territories. She attributes her initial exposure to Arctic Sports through a family friend, Ernie Bernhardt, who was living in Fort Smith when she was 11 or 12. She credits her father, Tim McDonald as her coach. She competed at the 1994 Arctic Winter Games while also taking care of her four month old son. Her daughter, Veronica McDonald, is also a very successful Arctic Sports athlete who was trained by both her grandfather and her mother.

== Career ==
=== Athletics ===
McDonald was coached by her father, Tim McDonald from an early age, and participated in Arctic Sports at the Arctic Winter Games ten times (1988 to 2006), winning 34 medals - 14 gold, 11 silver and 9 bronze. She set three records during that time, in Junior Women's Alaskan high kick (5'8") in 1990, the Open Women's Alaskan high kick (1.8 meters) in 1998, and the Open Women's triple jump event (7.08 meters) in 2000. McDonald received the Sport North Mary Beth MIller Memorial Senior Female Athlete of the Year in 1998. In 2015, she was inducted into the NWT Sport Hall of Fame in the athlete category in recognition of her outstanding career in Arctic Sports.

=== Community contributions ===
After her competition days, McDonald was appointed a director on the Arctic Winter Games International Committee in 2007, where she served for many years. She continued to promote traditional Indigenous games through the development of a technical training package for Arctic Sports, along with demonstrations and workshops she held across Canada. She explained, for example, how the one-foot, two-foot and Alaskan high kicks are performed in an Arctic Winter Games online video (3:17-4:15). McDonald goes on in the video to outline the "family philosophy" of these games, explaining how her family is all involved in passing down these traditional games through competing, coaching and officiating (4:34-5:03) She received the Governor General's Meritorious Service Medal - Civil Division, in 2017, in recognition of her athletic accomplishments and her promotion of "traditional sports in northern Canada and abroad, inspiring a new generation of athletes and helping to reconnect northern youth to their culture, their elders and their community."

== Awards ==
McDonald received the Sport North Federation's Mary Beth Miller Memorial Senior Female Athlete of the Year in 1998 and was awarded the Governor General's Meritorious Service Medal in 2017, with her investiture in 2019.
