= Nalukataq =

Spring whaling festival of the Iñupiat of Northern Alaska

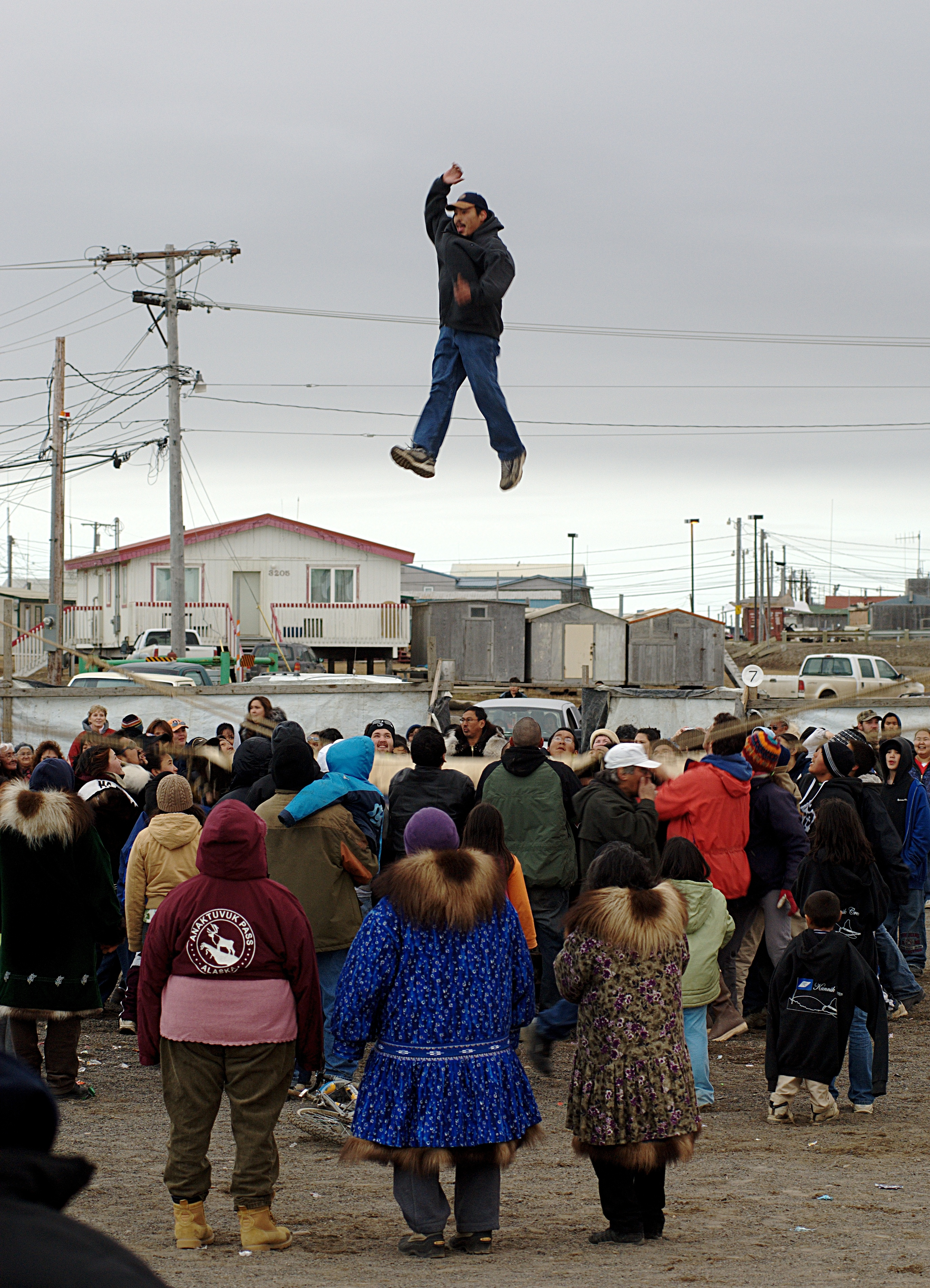
Blanket toss in Utqiagvik, Alaska

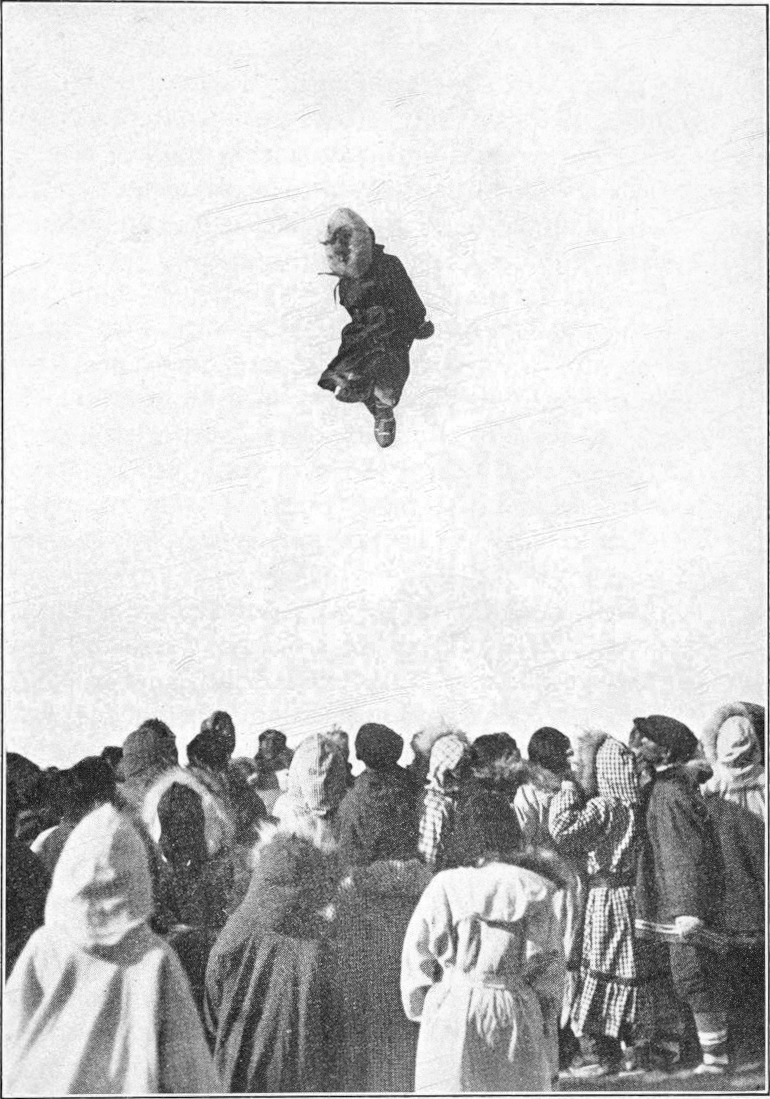
Blanket toss between 1921 and 1924

Nalukataq (Inupiaq: [nɐlukɐtɑq], naluk- 'to throw it underhand; to toss it up' + kataq) is the spring whaling festival of the Iñupiat of Northern Alaska, especially the North Slope Borough. It is characterized by its namesake, the blanket toss, traditionally using a walrus skin, of the Inuit. "Marking the end of the spring whaling season," Nalukataq creates "a sense of being for the entire community and for all who want a little muktuk or to take part in the blanket toss....At no time, however, does Nalukataq relinquish its original purpose, which is to recognize the annual success and prowess of each umialik, or whaling crew captain....Nalukataq [traditions] have always reflected the process of survival inherent in sharing...crucial to...the Arctic."

After the spring whale hunting season, successful crews celebrate with a Nalukataq festival. Associated with the summer solstice, these take place in June and are scheduled to avoid conflicts between villages in order to allow friends and relatives from distant communities to share the bounty and the fun. In Utqiagvik, for example, Nalukataq is usually held in the third week of June. Other villages may be in the week before or the week after. Scheduling depends on how many whales were caught as well as other factors.

Over the course of a couple of weeks, multiple Nalukataq celebrations may be held, and each of these may be put on by several captains. Utqiagvik, because of its large population, has the most events, but Point Hope, Alaska and other villages along the North Slope also stage several. For example, Kaktovik and Nuiqsut.

== Function ==
Nalukataq serves two purposes. First, it is a celebration of thanksgiving for success. Second, it is the first of several times during the year when quaq (frozen whale meat) and muktuk (whale blubber and skin) are distributed to the community. The ability to produce and distribute wealth among the community is highly valued in Inuit cultures. Whaling captains who always give away large portions of their whales gain great stature and respect within the village for every whale they catch. A captain, umialik, is able to sponsor or host, nalukataqtitchi, a festival after catching a whale.

Festive clothing is commonly worn to the event, and highly decorated mukluks and parkas of seal, caribou, wolverine, wolf, and fox are abundant. "The game is played by contemporary Eskimos apart from its ceremony, which is a part of the nelukatuk. Legend tells that the raven gave the Eskimos the Blanket Toss."

== Schedule ==
Lasting three days, (Qagruq or "first day of the whaling festival", Avarriqirut or "second day of the whaling festival", and Igauqtut or "third (last) day of the whaling festival") there are several stages to the celebration. It begins with a prayer or church service, and a raising of the crews' flags at around noon. A windbreak is often constructed in front of the captain's qalgit. Then bread, coffee, and initially various soups of goose and caribou are distributed. Following that, all of the food is one part or another of the whale. The flippers and certain of the guts of the whale are offered to visitors.

2018 VOA report about the festival

After a break, filled by singing and story telling, the whaling crews begin to distribute the catch to each family who attends the event. The amount that is given away depends on the size and number of whales harvested. First comes the quaq, which is whale meat frozen raw and cut into cubes. Next is the avarraq, the flukes (fin) of the whale cut into thin strips. Once these have been distributed, the various other cuts of muktuk are distributed frozen, with skin on. A hiatus of a couple of hours follows this, in which time everyone feasts on the catch.

In this interim period, the Nalukataq blanket is erected. The blanket, mapkuq, may be made from several walrus or bearded seal, ugruk, skins, or canvas, and sewn together in a circle or square. Outdoors a rope extends from each corner, and is pulled tightly between four wooden beams, formerly three whale bones, using block and tackle. This raises the blanket to about waist height. With or without the beams, men and women, naluaqtit ('pullers'. "the springs of a centuries-old trampoline."), circle the blanket and hold rope woven around the edges, and rhythmically pull out on the blanket to throw the blanket dancer, nalukataqtuaq, in the air. "As effective as a trampoline," heights of 20 ft (6 m) are estimated, and heights of 40 ft (12 m) are considered possible. The minimum goal is to land back on one's feet, next to do this as many times as possible, and advanced tricks include kicks and flips.

Anyone may be thrown on the blanket, but traditionally the captains and their wives go first. Originally they threw out goods, such as baleen or tobacco, clothing, tools, or food as a means of demonstrating their ability to provide, but today that tradition has evolved, and wives of the captains throw candy to surrounding children once airborne. This giving is also known as tossing, nalluġruq or nullui. This event is the highlight and namesake of the festival, and may last several hours. Now a celebratory recreation, it may have originated for the purpose of being able to assist with hunting by helping participants to eye game at farther distances, or to allow signaling at long distances. The blanket toss is open to viewing by tourists, and in 2000 Scott Gomez was tossed 20 ft (6 m). Former champion and state representative Reggie Joule, once appeared on The Tonight Show to discuss the blanket toss. Nalukataq is a men's and women's event in the World Eskimo Indian Olympics. One of the goals in the Olympics is to touch the ceiling of the Big Dipper Arena, now the Carlson Center.

Following the blanket toss, everyone gathers for a traditional dance. Here, everyone is welcome to dance.

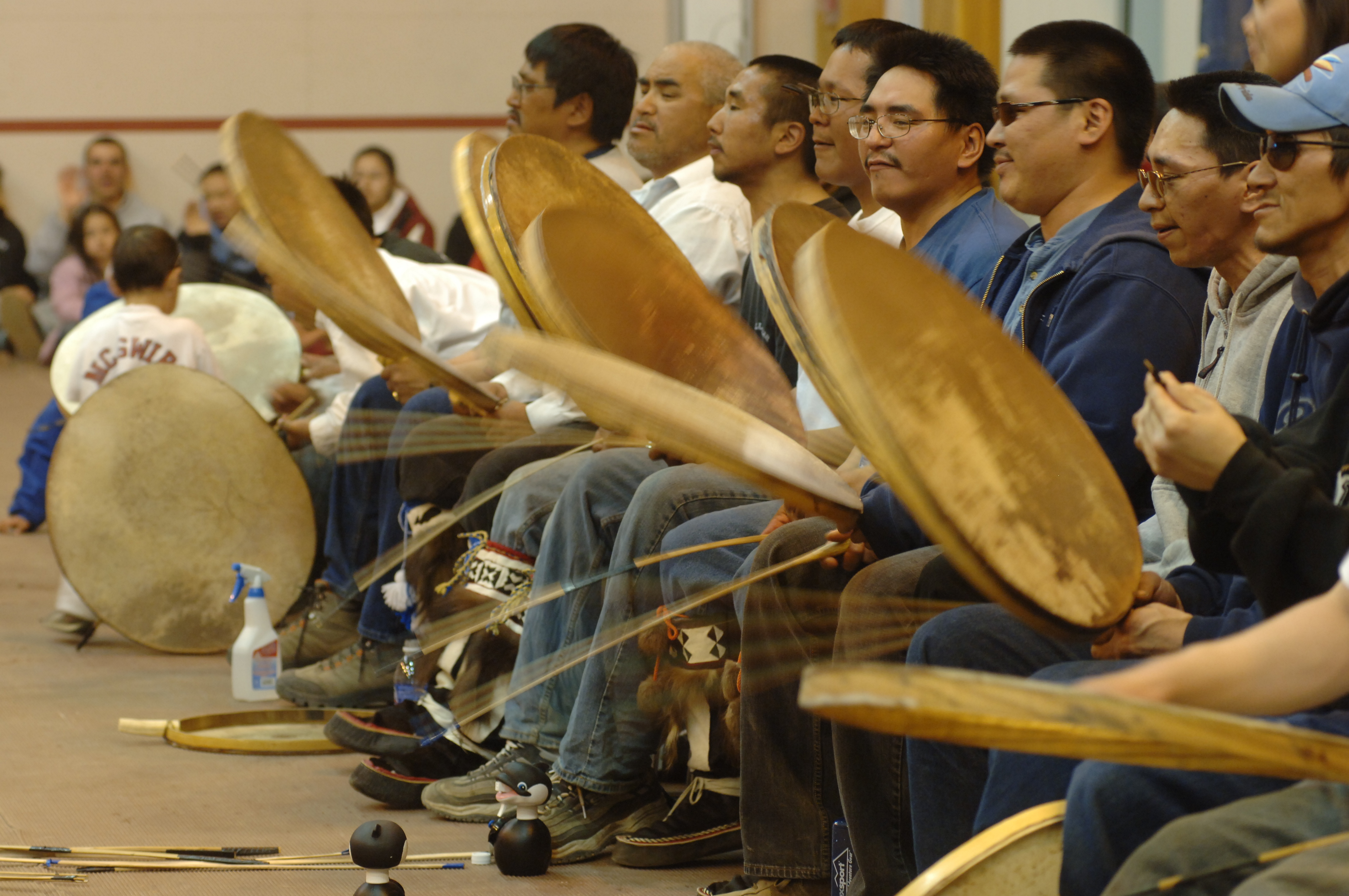
Performance by Utqiagvik's largest dance group. The white dress shirts seen worn by several members in this photo are a signature of the group during its major performances.

The beats are set by several men and boys playing drums. These were made traditionally from the skin of the liver or lungs of a whale, but today might also be made of synthetic materials. The men also sing songs (nalukataun) for the dances. Following another prayer, the evening closes.

In addition to dances where everyone participates, there are usually dances by the organized dance group for that village. They sing traditional songs and perform what is essentially a "stage show" for everyone. The best front row seats are always reserved for Elders.

== Terms ==
- Nalukataq: festival held at the conclusion of the whaling season featuring blanket tossing and a dance
- Mapkuq: blanket, originally bearded seal skin, used to toss jumpers
- Nalluaqtit: tossers, the people holding the skin
- Nalukataqtuaq: Jumper, the person on the skin
- Nalukataun: songs sung during Nalukataq
- Nalukattat: Nalukataq attendees

== See also ==
- Aboriginal whaling
- Arctic Winter Games
- High kick
- Messenger Feast
