= PainStation =

2001 video game

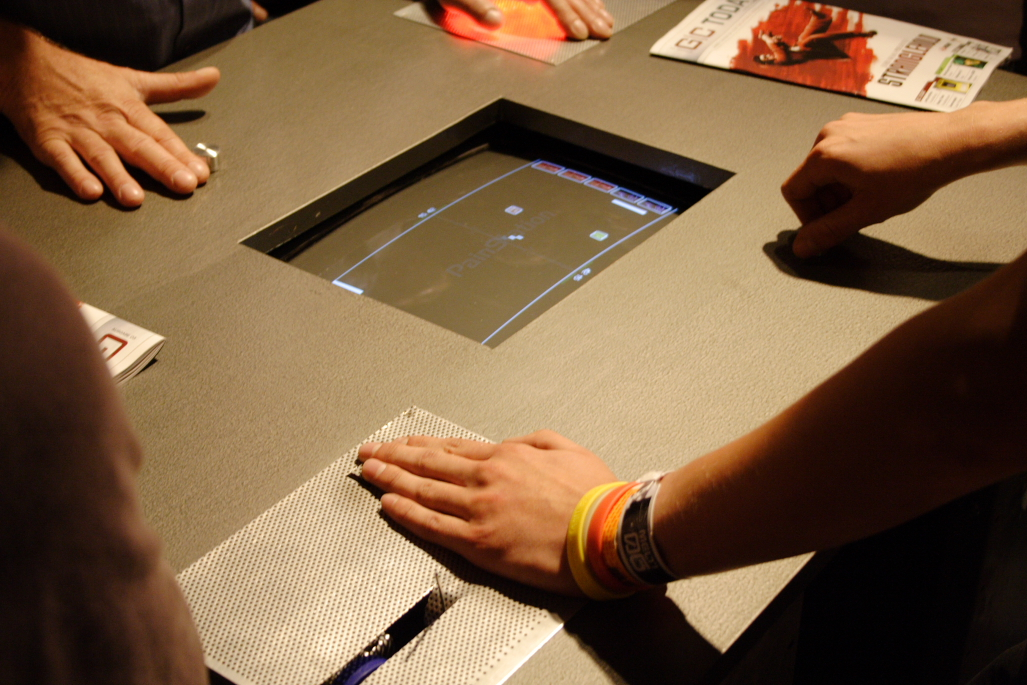
PainStation at the Games Convention 2006

PainStation is an art object and arcade game based on Pong developed by the artists' group "/////////fur//// art entertainment interfaces", with pain feedback.

== History ==
The system was originally developed by Tilman Reiff and Volker Morawe, two students at the Kunsthochschule für Medien Köln (Academy of Media Arts Cologne) in 2001, as an interactive art object. The pair later enhanced the device and released it under the company name of the "//////////fur//// art entertainment interfaces". The designers were inspired by the children's game Folter-Mau-Mau and the development of the modern computer game.

A similar game concept was featured in the 1983 James Bond movie Never Say Never Again.

The original concept was followed up with other stages of development which were regularly exhibited worldwide in different cultural contexts.

Following talks with Sony, the artists described the PainStation as "The artwork formerly known as PainStation".

== Basic concept ==
The PainStation consists of a specially made case that gives two players the opportunity of playing a specially adapted and expanded variant of the classic video game, Pong, against each other. The electronic controls are connected by digital transducers to several components providing sensory feedback to players.

During the game, the players place their left hands on the PEU (Pain Execution Unit) which serves as a sensor and feedback instrument. Possible feedback effects are heat impulses, an electric shock, and an integrated miniature wire whip. The feedback generated is dependent on the playing process and can increase in its intensity. The respective opponent can try to alter his or her playing style to purposely change the intensity of the feedback.

The following bonus items can be activated by hits in the current version of the software in 2006:

- Increase Ball Speed (3 levels)
- Double Pain Execution Time
- Quadruple Pain Execution Time
- Almost Unblockable Ricochet
- Cut Height of Bar By 50%
- Deadly Row
- Electric Boogaloo
- Burn In Bright
- Death Penalty
- Cheese!
- Ease the Pain!
- Cluster Bomb

No matter the score, the first player to remove their hand from the PEU device loses the game.

== PainStation ==
The heart of the original system was the Apple Computer G3 Macintosh, as well as a specifically made control plate. The programming was done with Macromedia Director and C++. The model was developed predominately out of available junk using a tube monitor. The first five high scores were originally computer generated absurdly high as a deterrent, but one entry was actually overwritten by a player at the Games Convention in 2006. Since then, "GOL" is on the list in second place with 300 points.

== PainStation 2.0 ==
Starting in 2002, the successor of the original PainStation was developed, the PainStation 2.0.

Apart from adjustable pain levels, it offers several replaceable whips and an additional source of light which players can use to produce glare on their opponent's side of the screen. The program was reprogrammed under Windows and the application was implemented in C++ and OpenGL, because the hardware the previous version had been based on became obsolete. The PEUs were fabricated for the first time with lasers from stainless steel. The higher processor performance makes it possible for the system to control the speed of the whip engine and the strength of the electric current individually.

The system was also for the first time made coin-operated. It is equipped with a 15-inch LCD monitor and it was shown to the public on June 25, 2003 on the German Harald Schmidt television show.

== PainStation 2.5 ==
The new case, painted in three metallic colors, consists mostly of medium-density fibreboard and has a modular design. This makes it easier to transport the system and to exchange defective components. Besides a 15-inch color screen, there is standard PC technology inside and a special control plate. The pain levels can be changed from 50% to 150%. The player must confirm that they are willing to participate in the game by pressing an "I agree" button before playing. Added benefits for the players include leather padded arm rests and the new ergonomic layout of the controls. Newly added fans in the PEUs cool the system down better between games to avoid electronic problems and can serve the players if they hit the right bonus item.

== Exhibitions ==
- Computerspielemuseum Berlin, since 2011 - The PainStation is part of the permanent exhibition. Playable during the opening hours of the museum for visitors of the age of 18 or older.

The system has been publicly presented at the following exhibitions and fairs:

- No Pain No Game, Bunkier Sztuki, Kraków, from September 4, 2014 - October 5, 2014
- Schmerz Exhibit in Berlin 2007
- pong.mythos in the Museum for Communication in Frankfurt/Main from November 16, 2006 - January 21, 2007
- Emergences 2006, Maison de la Villette, Paris, from September 29, 2006 - October 1, 2006
- GamesConvention, Leipzig, 2006
- Electrical Fantasista Exhibition, BankART NYK, Yokohama, from February 24, 2006 - March 16, 2006
- Blind Spots, Hannah Maclure Centre, Dundee, from January 30, 2006 - May 19, 2006
- ISC Symposium, University of St.Gallen, Switzerland, 2004
- Venus im Pelz (Venus in Furs), Neue Galerie, Graz, 2003
- DEAF 03, Parkhuis, Rotterdam, 2003
- Cyberarts Exhibition, OK Center, Linz, 2002
- Altitude 2001, Cologne, July 20, 2001
- Technisches Museum, Vienna
- HNF Heinz-Nixdorf-Forum, Paderborn

In the past years, the system has also been repeatedly displayed in clubs and discothèques, at LAN parties and at BDSM parties.

== Awards ==
- International Media Art Award, SWR/ZKM 2003
- Prix Ars Electronica 2002, "Anerkennung/Interaktive Kunst" (Acknowledgement/Interactive Art)

== See also ==
- Shocking Duel
- Pong
