= Ear pull =

Inuit teaching game

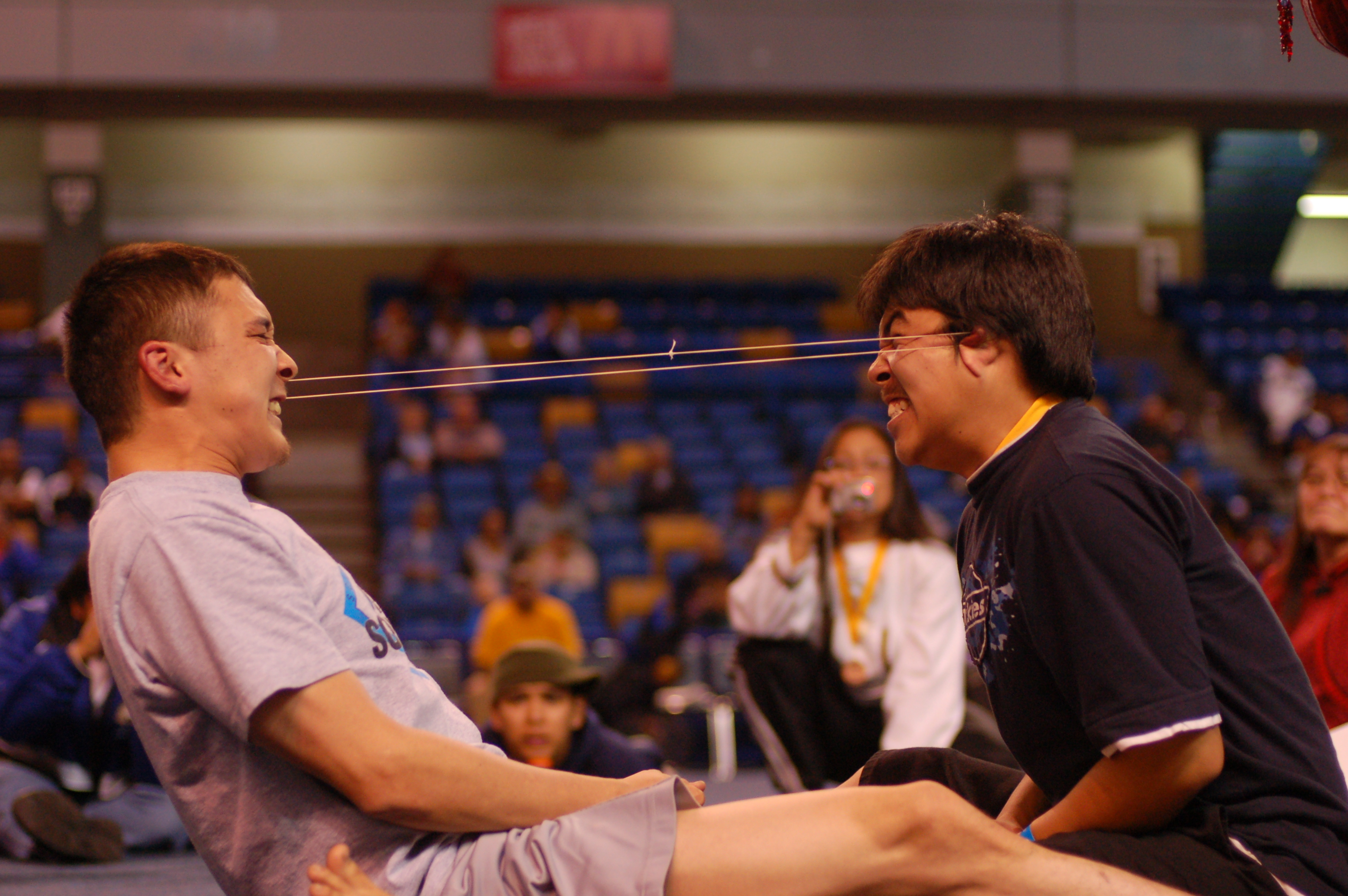
Ear pull match at the 2008 World Eskimo Indian Olympics

The ear pull is a traditional Inuit game or sport which tests the competitors' ability to endure pain, and also strength. In the ear pull, two competitors sit facing each other, their legs straddled and interlocked. A two-foot-long loop of string, similar to a thick, waxed dental floss, is looped behind their ears, connecting right ear to right ear, or left ear to left ear. The competitors then pull upon the opposing ear using their own ear until the cord comes free or the opponent quits from the pain. The game has been omitted from some Arctic sports competitions due to safety concerns and the squeamishness of spectators; the event can cause bleeding and competitors sometimes require stitches.

The Inuit ear pull game is a harsh test of physical endurance....[in which] a thin loop of leather is positioned behind the ears of each of two competitors who then pull away from each other until one gives up in pain.

The ear pull is one example of Inuit games that "prepare children for the rigours of the arctic environment by stressing... physical strength and endurance", as well as helping one keep a mental record of one's endurance levels.

Ear pull features at the World Eskimo-Indian Olympics.
