= Shocking Duel =

Pain endurance game

Game in progress

Shocking Duel is a game of pain endurance in which each player grips one of a pair of connected handles which deliver electric shocks of increasing intensity. The loser is the first player to release their handle.

== Reception ==
Pau Waelder studied similar games which delivered electric shocks to the opponent through a variety of interfaces; games such as PainStation, Legshocker, Tekken Torture and Tazer Tag. They were generally found to be popular or even addictive. He wrote, "What many players find in these games of pain is what many people in Western society are looking for in more or less sublimated forms: an engaging experience that involves both body and mind, a way to release aggressiveness in a harmless manner, a social intercourse, a chance to demonstrate one's self-efficacy before others, a different form of competition. ... pain is present here not just as a punishment, but especially as a threat. It is the threat of experiencing pain that puts the player in a state of alert, and being in this state is felt to be exciting and fun."

== Safety ==
The manufacturer's safety warning advises that the game may interfere with pacemakers and other electronic health equipment and that it should not be played by sufferers from epilepsy or heart conditions.

== See also ==
- Induction coil
