= World Eskimo Indian Olympics =

Native American multi-sport event

World Eskimo-Indian Olympics
- Abbreviation: WEIO
- Purpose: Multi-sport event for Inuit, Iñupiat, Yupik, and other Native American athletes
- Frequency: Every year
- Inaugurated: 1961
- Most recent: 2025
- Next event: 2026
- Headquarters: Fairbanks, Alaska
- Website: www.weio.org

The World Eskimo-Indian Olympics (abbreviated: WEIO, formerly the World Eskimo Olympics) is an American annual national multi-sport event held over a four-day period beginning the third Wednesday of each July, designed to preserve cultural practices and traditional (survival) skills essential to life in circumpolar areas of the world. These games are only between Native Americans in the United States and Indigenous from the Circumpolar North Region, Such as Canada, and Greenland.

== Sport and Culture Events ==
The WEIO features games or sports rooted in ancestral hunting and survival techniques employed by the Inuit, Iñupiat, Yupik, and other Native Americans in USA, as well as dance, storytelling competitions, and an annual cultural pageant, called Miss WEIO, that focuses on cultural knowledge.

== History ==
2021 VOA report about the olympics

WEIO began in 1961 as the World Eskimo Olympics and was initially held on the banks of the Chena River in downtown Fairbanks, Alaska, in conjunction with the Golden Days celebration festivities. The event was sponsored by the City of Fairbanks, through the city's Chamber of Commerce.

City in first games:

1. Utqiagvik
2. Unalakleet
3. Tanana
4. Fort Yukon
5. Noorvik
6. Nome

In 1970, sponsorship of the event was transferred to the statewide newspaper Tundra Times and several revisions were made. This includes the name change – which inserted "Indian" to better reflect the ethnicity of the participants – and the introduction of events for women. The first decade of the events featured male-only participants; eventually, the number of events with women competing increased. Women now participate in some of the more arduous events, including ear pulls and high kicks.

Six years later, WEIO reorganized as a 501(c) non-profit organization, which took over sponsorship from the newspaper, and has been responsible for plans, preparations, and stagings related to the event.

After four and a half decades in Fairbanks, the games were relocated to Anchorage, Alaska in 2007 following a successful bid to host the event. WEIO board members were concerned that Fairbanks officials were becoming complacent, and elected to examine other venues.

The organization's general assembly voted to have the games held at the new location earlier that spring.

The event in Anchorage proved to be too costly and the games have not returned since. Fairbanks is recognized as WEIO's permanent home.

In 2018, WEIO introduced a new logo designed by Yup'ik artist Aassanaaq Ossie Kairaiuak, who is better known as a member of the band Pamyua. The new design was chosen because it better exemplifies the cultural roots of the organization. It is now included on WEIO's website, weio.org and Facebook page.

== Games ==
The 2020 WEIO event was canceled due the COVID-19 pandemic. The 2021 (60th Anniversary) WEIO Games were scheduled for July 21–24, 2021 at the Big Dipper Ice Arena in Fairbanks, Alaska, with the opening ceremonies featuring PBS Kids character Molly of Denali.

== Results ==
=== Miss WEIO ===
Miss WEIO:

=== WEIO Games ===
2023:

2022:

2021:

2019:

2018:

2017:

=== Records ===
Native Games World Records:

== Events ==
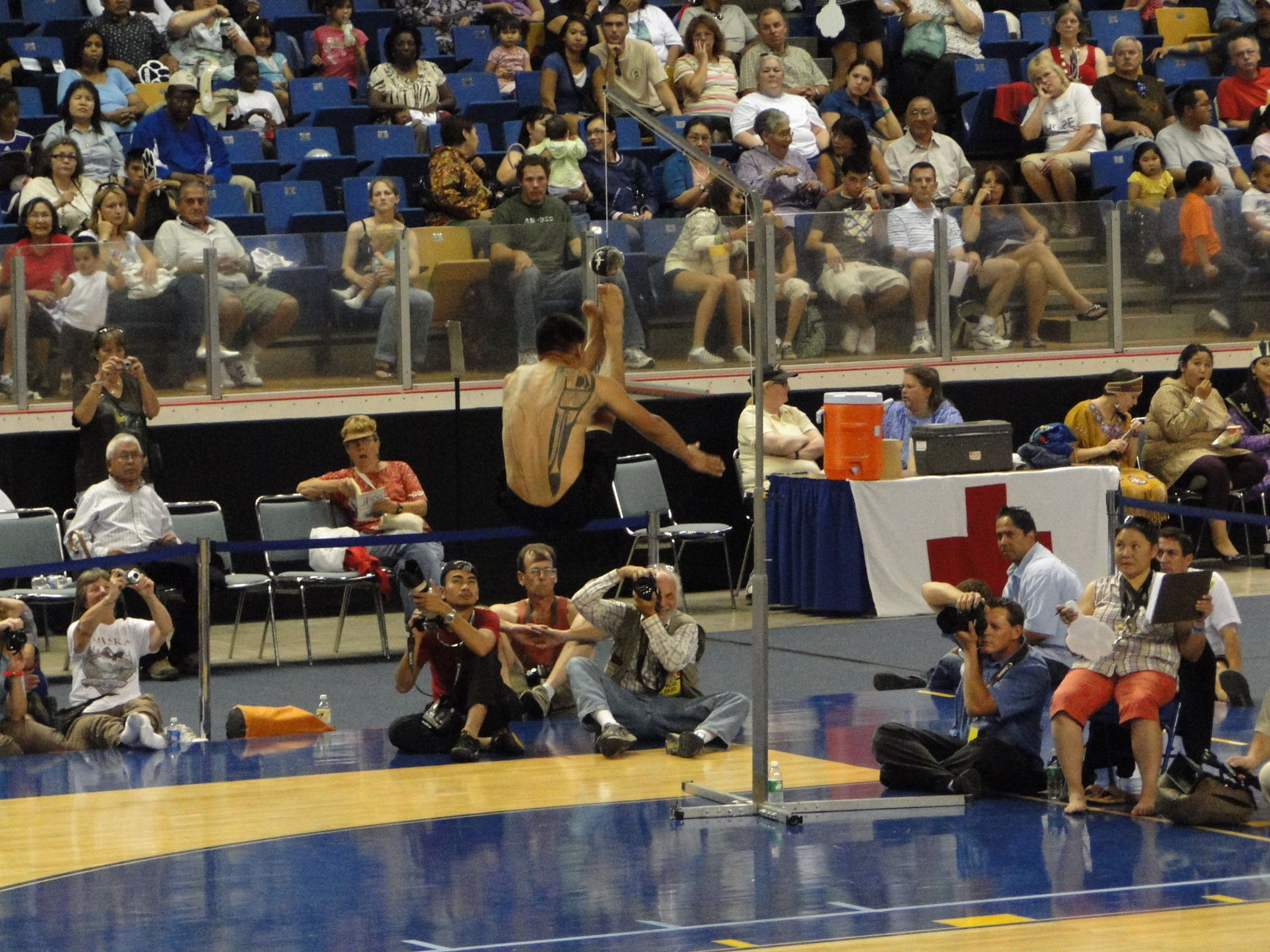
Two foot high kick, 2009.

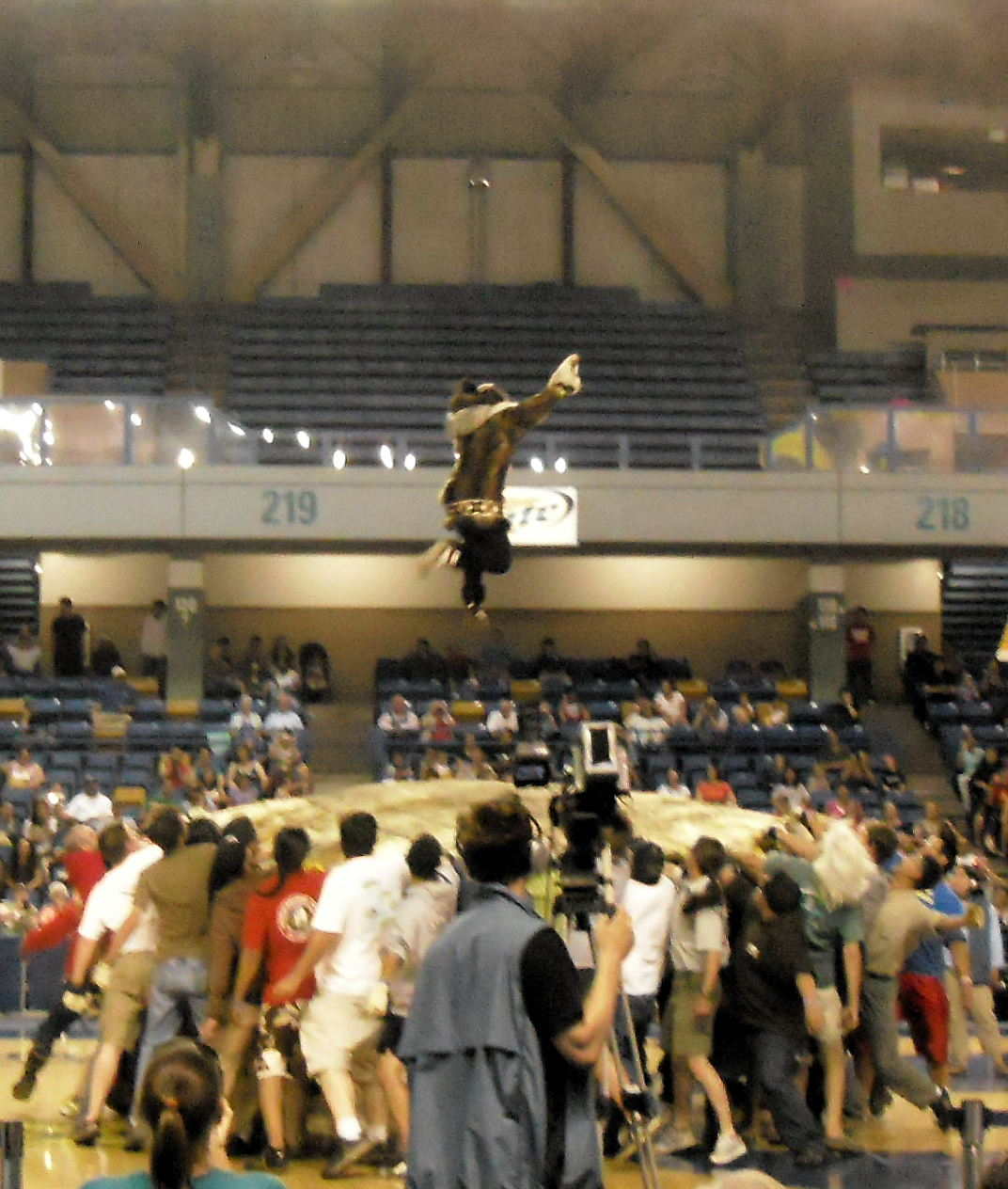
Blanket toss, 2011.

Events played at the WEIO are either traditional or everyday tasks unique to Eskimo or northern native culture:

1. Knuckle hop or seal hop
2. Four man carry
3. Ear weight
4. Ear pull
5. Drop the bomb
6. One foot high kick and akratcheak (two foot High kick)
7. One hand reach
8. Alaskan High kick
9. Kneel jump
10. Indian stick pull
11. Eskimo stick pull (tug of war)
12. Toe kick
13. Arm pull
14. Nalukataq (blanket toss)
15. Seal skinning
16. Maktak eating
17. Greased pole walk
18. Bench reach

== See also ==
- Arctic Winter Games
- Nalukataq
