= High kick =

Event at the Artic Winter Games

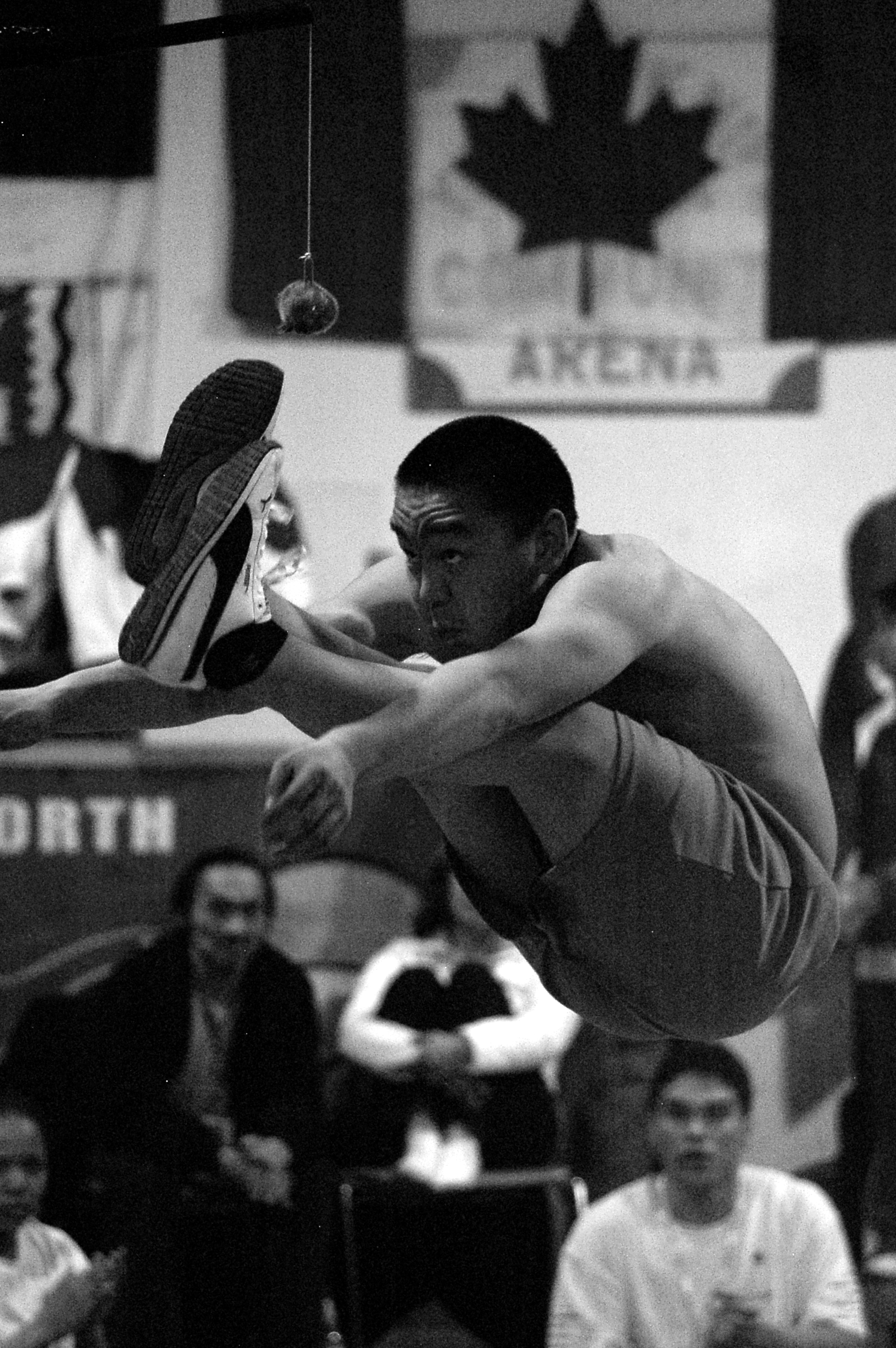
An athlete performing a two-foot high kick at the Arctic Winter Games

The high kick is a traditional Inuit event performed at the Arctic Winter Games, the World Eskimo Indian Olympics and other traditional events.

== One foot high kick ==
The Inuit one-foot high kick is a traditional competition that is similar to the two foot high kick.

In this competition the competitor stands on one foot, jumps in the air and hits a ball or piece of seal such as a ringed seal, which is suspended from a gallows and then lands on the same foot.

The one foot high kick tests the strength and agility of a hunter. It was also used to signal a successful hunt in some communities.

A short film made by Alethea Arnaquq-Baril for the 2010 Winter Olympics in Vancouver shows Arctic Winter Games champion Johnny Issaluk performing a one foot high kick.

== Two foot high kick ==
The two-foot high kick (akratcheak) is a traditional Inuit jumping event that occurs at many Arctic sports competitions. In the two-foot high kick, athletes must jump using two feet, touch a hanging target with both feet, and land on both feet, maintaining balance. The event is often considered the most demanding Arctic sport.

The event has its origin in subsistence whale hunting: when a whale was taken, a messenger would run to the village and kick both feet in the air once within eyeshot. Villagers would then know to prepare to harvest the whale.

As of 2007, the men's record in the event was 2.64 m (8 ft 8 in); the women's record was 1.98 m (6 ft 6 in).

== Alaskan high kick ==
Balance on one foot while holding the other. Kick a target straight above with the balancing foot to reach a target, then land on the balancing and kicking foot.
