= 2022 Northwest Territories Scotties Tournament of Hearts =

- Host city: Inuvik, Northwest Territories
- Arena: Inuvik Curling Club
- Dates: January 5–9

The 2022 Northwest Territories Scotties Tournament of Hearts, the women's territorial curling championship for the Northwest Territories, was scheduled to be held January 5 to 9 at the Inuvik Curling Club in Inuvik, Northwest Territories. The winning team was to represent Northwest Territories at the 2022 Scotties Tournament of Hearts in Thunder Bay, Ontario.

Following new COVID-19 health orders in the Northwest Territories, the event was cancelled on January 4, 2022. That same day, it was announced that Team Kerry Galusha would represent the Northwest Territories at the 2022 Scotties Tournament of Hearts.

== Teams ==
The teams that registered were as follows:

Skip	Third	Second	Lead	Club
Jo-Ann Rizzo (Fourth)	Sarah Koltun	Margot Flemming	Kerry Galusha (Skip)	Yellowknife CC, Yellowknife
Pearl Gillis	Tamara Bain	Adrianna Hendrick	Tyra Bain	Inuvik CC, Inuvik
Melba Mitchell	Alison Lennie	Wilhelmina Lennie	Eleanor Jerome	Inuvik CC, Inuvik
Reese Wainman	Alex Testart-Campbell	Brooke Smith	Withney Kasook	Inuvik CC, Inuvik

== Round-robin standings ==
Key
Teams to Playoffs

Skip	W	L	PF	PA	EW	EL	BE	SE
Kerry Galusha	0	0	0	0	0	0	0	0
Pearl Gillis	0	0	0	0	0	0	0	0
Melba Mitchell	0	0	0	0	0	0	0	0
Reese Wainman	0	0	0	0	0	0	0	0

== Round-robin results ==
All draw times are listed in Mountain Time (UTC-07:00).

=== Draw 1 ===
Wednesday, January 5, 7:30 pm

Sheet A	1	2	3	4	5	6	7	8	9	10	Final
Melba Mitchell											0
Pearl Gillis											0

Sheet C	1	2	3	4	5	6	7	8	9	10	Final
Reese Wainman											0
Kerry Galusha											0

=== Draw 2 ===
Thursday, January 6, 2:00 pm

Sheet A	1	2	3	4	5	6	7	8	9	10	Final
Kerry Galusha											0
Melba Mitchell											0

Sheet C	1	2	3	4	5	6	7	8	9	10	Final
Pearl Gillis											0
Reese Wainman											0

=== Draw 3 ===
Thursday, January 6, 7:30 pm

Sheet A	1	2	3	4	5	6	7	8	9	10	Final
Pearl Gillis											0
Kerry Galusha											0

Sheet C	1	2	3	4	5	6	7	8	9	10	Final
Reese Wainman											0
Melba Mitchell											0

=== Draw 4 ===
Friday, January 7, 2:00 pm

Sheet A	1	2	3	4	5	6	7	8	9	10	Final
Melba Mitchell											0
Reese Wainman											0

Sheet C	1	2	3	4	5	6	7	8	9	10	Final
Kerry Galusha											0
Pearl Gillis											0

=== Draw 5 ===
Friday, January 7, 7:30 pm

Sheet A	1	2	3	4	5	6	7	8	9	10	Final
Reese Wainman											0
Pearl Gillis											0

Sheet C	1	2	3	4	5	6	7	8	9	10	Final
Melba Mitchell											0
Kerry Galusha											0

=== Draw 6 ===
Saturday, January 8, 2:00 pm

Sheet A	1	2	3	4	5	6	7	8	9	10	Final
Kerry Galusha											0
Reese Wainman											0

Sheet C	1	2	3	4	5	6	7	8	9	10	Final
Pearl Gillis											0
Melba Mitchell											0

== Playoffs ==
Page playoff system
1
2
3
4

Semifinal

Final

=== 1 vs. 2 ===
Saturday, January 8, 7:30 pm

Team	1	2	3	4	5	6	7	8	9	10	Final
											0
											0

=== 3 vs. 4 ===
Saturday, January 8, 7:30 pm

Team	1	2	3	4	5	6	7	8	9	10	Final
											0
											0

=== Semifinal ===
Sunday, January 9, 10:00 am

Team	1	2	3	4	5	6	7	8	9	10	Final
											0
											0

=== Final ===
Sunday, January 9, 3:30 pm

Team	1	2	3	4	5	6	7	8	9	10	Final
											0
											0

2022 Northwest Territories Scotties Tournament of Hearts
(Northwest Territories)
Territorial Championship title
