= 2026 Northwest Territories Women's Curling Championship =

Canadian territorial women's curling championship

2025 Northwest Territories Women's Curling Championships
- Host city: Inuvik, Northwest Territories
- Arena: Inuvik Curing Centre
- Dates: December 18–21, 2025
- Winner: Nicky Kaufman
- Curling club: Yellowknife Curling Club, Yellowknife
- Skip: Nicky Kaufman
- Third: Megan Koehler
- Second: Sydney Galusha
- Lead: Ella Skauge
- Alternate: Brynn Chorostkowski
- Coach: Kerry Galusha
- Finalist: Betti Delorey

The 2026 Northwest Territories Women's Curling Championship, the women's territorial curling championship for the Northwest Territories, was held from December 18 to 21, 2025 at the Inuvik Curing Centre in Inuvik, Northwest Territories. The winning rink will represent the Northwest Territories at the 2026 Scotties Tournament of Hearts in Mississauga, Ontario.

== Teams ==
The teams are as follows:

Skip	Third	Second	Lead	Alternate	Coach	Club
Betti Delorey	Halli-Rai Delorey	Makayla Cook	Tyanna Bain			–
Nicky Kaufman	Megan Koehler	Sydney Galusha	Ella Skauge	Brynn Chorostkowski	Kerry Galusha	Yellowknife CC, Yellowknife
Morgan Muise	Reese Wainman	Brooke Smith	Carina McKay-Saturnino		Mary-Anne Arsenault	–

== Round robin standings ==
Final Round Robin Standings

Key
Teams to Playoffs

Skip	W	L	PF	PA	EW	EL	BE	SE	LSD
Nicky Kaufman	3	1	29	23	19	16	2	9	292.5
Morgan Muise	3	1	27	22	20	15	3	9	697.7
Betti Delorey	0	4	19	30	12	20	2	0	598.5

== Round robin results ==
All draw times are listed in Mountain Time (UTC-07:00).

=== Draw 1 ===
Thursday, December 18, 1:00 pm

Team	1	2	3	4	5	6	7	8	9	10	Final
Morgan Muise	0	1	0	4	0	1	1	0	1	X	8
Betti Delorey	0	0	1	0	3	0	0	0	0	X	4

=== Draw 2 ===
Thursday, December 18, 7:00 pm

Team	1	2	3	4	5	6	7	8	9	10	Final
Morgan Muise	0	1	2	2	1	0	0	1	0	0	7
Nicky Kaufman	2	0	0	0	0	1	1	0	2	0	6

=== Draw 3 ===
Friday, December 19, 1:00 pm

Team	1	2	3	4	5	6	7	8	9	10	Final
Betti Delorey	0	0	1	0	1	0	2	0	0	1	5
Nicky Kaufman	2	0	0	1	0	1	0	0	2	0	6

=== Draw 4 ===
Friday, December 19, 7:00 pm

Team	1	2	3	4	5	6	7	8	9	10	Final
Morgan Muise	0	1	1	0	1	0	1	0	2	0	6
Betti Delorey	0	0	0	1	0	2	0	1	0	1	5

=== Draw 5 ===
Saturday, December 20, 1:00 pm

Team	1	2	3	4	5	6	7	8	9	10	Final
Morgan Muise	0	0	0	0	2	0	1	1	1	1	6
Nicky Kaufman	1	1	1	1	0	3	0	0	0	0	7

=== Draw 6 ===
Saturday, December 20, 7:00 pm

Team	1	2	3	4	5	6	7	8	9	10	Final
Betti Delorey	2	0	0	0	0	0	0	3	0	X	5
Nicky Kaufman	0	0	1	1	1	2	4	0	1	X	10

== Playoffs ==
Semifinal			Final
			1	Nicky Kaufman	8
2	Morgan Muise	5	3	Betti Delorey	6
3	Betti Delorey	12

=== Semifinal ===
Sunday, December 21, 11:00 am

Team	1	2	3	4	5	6	7	8	9	10	Final
Morgan Muise	2	0	1	0	0	0	2	0	0	X	5
Betti Delorey	0	3	0	2	1	3	0	1	2	X	12

=== Final ===
Sunday, December 21, 5:00 pm

Team	1	2	3	4	5	6	7	8	9	10	Final
Nicky Kaufman	0	3	0	2	1	0	0	1	0	1	8
Betti Delorey	2	0	1	0	0	1	1	0	1	0	6

2026 Northwest Territories Women's Curling Championship
(Northwest Territories)
Nicky Kaufman
1st Territorial Championship title
