= Northwest Territories Women's Curling Championship =

- Established: 2011
- 2026 host city: Inuvik
- 2026 arena: Inuvik Curling Centre
- 2026 champion: Nicky Kaufman

Current edition
- 2026 Northwest Territories Women's Curling Championship

The Northwest Territories Women's Curling Championship, formerly the Northwest Territories Scotties Tournament of Hearts is the women's territorial championship for women's curling in the Northwest Territories. Beginning in 2015, the event serves as a direct qualifier to the Scotties Tournament of Hearts, Canada's national women's curling championships. Prior to 2015, the event served as a qualifier for the Yukon/NWT Scotties Tournament of Hearts.

== Winners (2015–present) ==
Event	Winning team	Winning club	City	Runner-up team	Host	Hearts rec.
2026	Nicky Kaufman, Megan Koehler, Sydney Galusha, Ella Skauge, Brynn Chorostkowski	Yellowknife Curling Centre	Yellowknife	Betti Delorey, Halli Delorey, Makayla Cook, Tyanna Bain	Inuvik	13th (2–6)
2025	Kerry Galusha, Megan Koehler, Sydney Galusha, Shona Barbour, Ella Skauge	Yellowknife Curling Centre	Yellowknife	Betti Delorey, Halli Delorey, Makayla Cook, Tyanna Bain	Yellowknife	13th (3–5)
2024	Jo-Ann Rizzo (Fourth), Margot Flemming, Sarah Koltun, Kerry Galusha (Skip)	Yellowknife Curling Centre	Yellowknife	Reese Wainman (Fourth), Alex Testart-Campbell, Brooke Smith, Sharon Cormier (Skip), Tamara Bain	Hay River	12th (3–5)
2023	Jo-Ann Rizzo (Fourth), Margot Flemming, Sarah Koltun, Kerry Galusha (Skip), Megan Koehler	Yellowknife Curling Centre	Yellowknife	Reese Wainman, Alex Testart-Campbell, Brooke Smith, Tamara Bain	Inuvik	10th (4–4)
2022	Cancelled due to the COVID-19 pandemic in the Northwest Territories. Kerry Galusha, Jo-Ann Rizzo, Margot Flemming, Sarah Koltun and Megan Koehler to represent the Northwest Territories at the Scotties.					T5th (6–4)
2021	Kerry Galusha, Jo-Ann Rizzo, Margot Flemming, Shona Barbour	Yellowknife Curling Centre	Yellowknife	Cassie Rogers, Chasity O'Keefe, Kali Skauge, Grace Twa, Parker Waddell	Yellowknife	T9th (4–4)
2020	Jo-Ann Rizzo, Sarah Koltun, Kerry Galusha (skip), Shona Barbour	Yellowknife Curling Centre	Yellowknife	Sarah Stroeder, Sharon Cormier, Megan Koehler, Anneli Jokela	Hay River	12th (2–5)
2019	Kerry Galusha, Sarah Koltun, Brittany Tran, Shona Barbour	Yellowknife Curling Centre	Yellowknife	Tyana Bain, Pearl Gillis, Mataya Gillis, Adrianna Hendrick	Yellowknife	10th (3–4)
2018	Kerry Galusha, Sarah Koltun, Megan Koehler, Shona Barbour	Yellowknife Curling Centre	Yellowknife	Melba Mitchell, Bella Charlie, Leah Lennie, Tanya Gruben	Inuvik	13th (2–6)
2017	Kerry Galusha, Megan Koehler, Danielle Derry, Sharon Cormier, Shona Barbour	Yellowknife Curling Centre	Yellowknife	None entered	N/A	8th (8–7)
2016	Kerry Galusha, Megan Cormier, Danielle Derry, Shona Barbour Sharon Cormier	Yellowknife Curling Centre	Yellowknife	Judy Goucher, Candi Carleton, Kandis Jameson, Kelsey Gill	Hay River	13th (2–2)
2015	Kerry Galusha, Megan Cormier, Danielle Derry, Shona Barbour Sharon Cormier	Yellowknife Curling Centre	Yellowknife	Ann McKellar-Gillis, Cheryl Burlington, Cheryl Tordoff, Natalie Kelln	Yellowknife	13th (1–2)

Italics indicate alternate

== Winners (2011–2014) ==
Event	Winning team	Winning club
2014	Kerry Galusha, Ashley Green, Megan Cormier, Wendy Miller	Yellowknife
2013	Kerry Galusha, Sharon Cormier, Megan Cormier, Wendy Miller, Shona Barbour	Yellowknife
2012	Kerry Galusha, Sharon Cormier, Shona Barbour, (Note: Five-person rotation, with the front end rotating.) Megan Cormier, Wendy Miller	Yellowknife
2011	Sharon Cormier, Tara Naugler, Megan Cormier, Danielle Ellis	Yellowknife
