= 2025 Northwest Territories Women's Curling Championship =

Canadian territorial women's curling championship

2025 Northwest Territories Women's Curling Championships
- Host city: Yellowknife, Northwest Territories
- Arena: Yellowknife Curling Club
- Dates: January 17–19
- Winner: Team Galusha
- Curling club: Yellowknife CC, Yellowknife
- Skip: Kerry Galusha
- Third: Megan Koehler
- Second: Sydney Galusha
- Lead: Shona Barbour
- Alternate: Ella Skauge
- Finalist: Betti Delorey

The 2025 Northwest Territories Women's Curling Championship, the women's territorial curling championship for the Northwest Territories, was held from January 17 to 19 at the Yellowknife Curling Club in Yellowknife, Northwest Territories. The winning Kerry Galusha rink represented the Northwest Territories at the 2025 Scotties Tournament of Hearts in Thunder Bay, Ontario.

Since only two teams entered the territorial championship, the event was a best-of-5 format, with Galusha winning 3–1 over the Betti Delorey rink.

== Teams ==
The teams are as follows:

Skip	Third	Second	Lead	Alternate	Club
Betti Delorey	Halli Delorey	Makayla Cook	Tyanna Bain		Hay River CC, Hay River
Kerry Galusha	Megan Koehler	Sydney Galusha	Shona Barbour	Ella Skauge	Yellowknife CC, Yellowknife

== Scores ==
All draw times are listed in Mountain Time (UTC-07:00).

=== Draw 1 ===
Friday, January 17, 1:00 pm

Sheet C	1	2	3	4	5	6	7	8	9	10	Final
Betti Delorey	2	3	1	0	1	1	0	0	3	X	11
Kerry Galusha	0	0	0	2	0	0	3	1	0	X	6

=== Draw 2 ===
Saturday, January 18, 10:00 am

Sheet C	1	2	3	4	5	6	7	8	9	10	Final
Kerry Galusha	0	4	0	2	1	0	2	0	2	X	11
Betti Delorey	1	0	2	0	0	1	0	2	0	X	6

=== Draw 3 ===
Saturday, January 18, 3:30 pm

Sheet C	1	2	3	4	5	6	7	8	9	10	Final
Betti Delorey	0	0	2	0	0	2	0	0	X	X	4
Kerry Galusha	2	3	0	2	3	0	1	0	X	X	11

=== Draw 4 ===
Sunday, January 19, 10:00 am

Sheet C	1	2	3	4	5	6	7	8	9	10	Final
Kerry Galusha	1	3	1	3	2	2	X	X	X	X	12
Betti Delorey	0	0	0	0	0	0	X	X	X	X	0

2025 Northwest Territories Scotties Tournament of Hearts
(Northwest Territories)
Kerry Galusha
21st Territorial Championship title
