= Sarah Koltun =

Canadian curler (born 1993)

- Curler
- Born: July 6, 1993 (age 33); Whitehorse, Yukon

Team
- Curling club: Yellowknife CC; Yellowknife, NT
- Skip: Kayla Skrlik
- Third: Myla Plett
- Second: Sarah Koltun
- Lead: Samantha Fisher

Curling career
- Member Association: Yukon (2007–2017); Northwest Territories (2017–2024); British Columbia (2024–2026); Alberta (2026–present)
- Hearts: 10 (2014, 2015, 2017, 2018, 2019, 2020, 2022, 2023, 2024, 2025)
- Top CTRS ranking: 6th (2024–25)
Medal record
Representing Yukon
Arctic Winter Games
Gold medal – first place	2010 Grande Prairie
Silver medal – second place	2008 Yellowknife

Sarah Elizabeth Anne Koltun (born July 6, 1993) is a Canadian curler from Kamloops, British Columbia. She currently plays second on Team Kayla Skrlik.

== Career ==
At just 13 years old, Koltun's first national championship was at the 2007 Canadian Junior Curling Championships where her team finished last with a 1–11 record. Later that year, she skipped the Yukon rink to a 1–5 record at the 2007 Canada Winter Games. She also skipped the Yukon team at the next seven Canadian Junior Curling Championships. Her best result was in 2013, skipping the team to a 7–4 record before losing in a tiebreaker. Other notable results were a 6–6 record in 2011 and a 5–7 finish in 2009. Koltun also represented Yukon a second time at the Canada Games in 2011, finishing 3–2. She competed at two Arctic Winter Games as well in 2008 and 2010 winning a gold medal in 2010 and a silver medal in 2008.

After her junior rink competed at the 2014 Canadian Junior Curling Championships which was her final year of juniors, the team got to represent Yukon/Northwest Territories at the 2014 Scotties Tournament of Hearts as they had previously won the 2014 NWT/Yukon Scotties Tournament of Hearts. They were the first team from Yukon to win the event since 2000. At the Hearts in Montreal, Quebec, they finished last, however they were able to defeat Prince Edward Island's Kim Dolan and Saskatchewan's Stefanie Lawton. The following year, Yukon and Northwest Territories had separate entries to the national championship however due to a format change and because they placed last the previous year, they were put into a pre-qualifying tournament against Northern Ontario and Northwest Territories to determine the final spot in the main draw. They would lose both of their games and were eliminated. They would not participate in the 2016 Yukon Scotties Tournament of Hearts but returned in 2017 where they won the event by default. At the 2017 Scotties Tournament of Hearts, they managed to win their game against Nunavut however lost to both the Territories and New Brunswick and were once again eliminated. After the season, Koltun moved to the Northwest Territories to join the Kerry Galusha rink at third.

Team Galusha went undefeated at the 2018 Northwest Territories Scotties Tournament of Hearts. The format at the national 2018 Scotties Tournament of Hearts had changed again, putting sixteen teams into two pools of eight teams. They finished 1–6 in their pool, only beating Koltun's former province Yukon. This put them into the thirteenth place game against Prince Edward Island's Robyn MacPhee rink, which they won. The following season, they added former Canadian Junior champion Brittany Tran to the team at second. The team won their first World Curling Tour event, the 2018 Royal LePage Women's Fall Classic. Team Galusha easily won the 2019 Northwest Territories Scotties Tournament of Hearts, winning all three of her games in a best of five series against the Tyanna Bain junior rink from Inuvik. At the 2019 Scotties Tournament of Hearts, the Galusha rink had a strong start, winning three of their first four games, before losing three straight, and were eliminated after pool play with a 3–4 record.

The Galusha rink added experienced player Jo-Ann Rizzo for the 2019–20 season. They had some success on the tour, having a quarterfinal finish at the 2019 AMJ Campbell Shorty Jenkins Classic and reaching the semifinals of the Stu Sells Toronto Tankard. They defended their territorial title by winning the 2020 Northwest Territories Scotties Tournament of Hearts in January 2020. At the 2020 Scotties Tournament of Hearts, they finished 2–5, not enough to advance to the championship pool. The following season, Team Galusha again won the 2021 Northwest Territories Scotties Tournament of Hearts, however, Koltun did not compete with the team as the Hearts were to be held in a bio-secure "bubble" to prevent spread of the COVID-19 virus. She was replaced in the lineup by Shona Barbour. At the 2021 Scotties Tournament of Hearts, Team Galusha finished the round robin with a 4–4 record, just missing the championship pool.

Team Galusha had a great start to the 2021–22 season, beginning with the Stu Sells Oakville Tankard where they lost in the final to Team Hollie Duncan. The following week, they won the KW Fall Classic after defeating the Duncan rink in the championship game. Due to the COVID-19 pandemic in Canada, the qualification process for the 2021 Canadian Olympic Curling Trials had to be modified to qualify enough teams for the championship. In these modifications, Curling Canada created the 2021 Canadian Curling Pre-Trials Direct-Entry Event, an event where eight teams would compete to try to earn one of two spots into the 2021 Canadian Olympic Curling Pre-Trials. Team Galusha qualified for the Pre-Trials Direct-Entry Event as the fourth seed. The team qualified for the playoffs by going 3–0 in the A Event and then defeated Team Robyn Silvernagle (skipped by Jessie Hunkin) 10–8 to earn the first spot in the Pre-Trials. The next month, the team competed in the Pre-Trials where they finished with a 1–5 record, only beating Team Penny Barker. The 2022 Northwest Territories Scotties Tournament of Hearts was cancelled due to the pandemic and Team Galusha were selected to represent the Territories at the national women's championship. At the 2022 Scotties Tournament of Hearts, the team finished the round robin with a 5–3 record, qualifying them for a tiebreaker against Manitoba's Mackenzie Zacharias. Team Galusha won the tiebreaker 8–6, earning themselves a spot in the playoffs and becoming the first team solely representing the Northwest Territories to qualify for the playoffs in Scotties history. They then lost in the first game of the playoff round to New Brunswick's Andrea Crawford and were eliminated from contention.

To begin the 2022–23 season, Team Galusha reached the quarterfinals of the 2022 Saville Shoot-Out where they lost to Casey Scheidegger. They then played in the 2022 PointsBet Invitational where they again lost to the Scheidegger rink in the opening round. The team continued to have success on tour in October, reaching the semifinals of the 2022 Tour Challenge Tier 2 Slam and the quarterfinals of the North Grenville Women's Fall Curling Classic. In the new year, they again went undefeated to win the 2023 Northwest Territories Scotties Tournament of Hearts, defeating Reese Wainman 8–1 in the final. Representing the Territories at the 2023 Scotties Tournament of Hearts, Team Galusha started the event with a 3–1 record before losing their next three games. They won their final game against the Yukon to finish fourth in their pool with a 4–4 record, missing the playoffs.

The Galusha rink did not have as much success on tour the following season, only reaching the playoffs in two of their first six events. This included a semifinal finish at the Alberta Tour Kick-off and a quarterfinal appearance at the 2023 KW Fall Classic. In December, the team went undefeated at the Stu Sells Brantford Nissan Classic until the final where they lost to Courtney Auld. After winning the 2024 Northwest Territories Scotties Tournament of Hearts, the team announced the 2024 Scotties Tournament of Hearts would be their last event together as they would disband at the end of the season. At the Hearts, the team finished fifth in their pool with a 3–5 record. This included defeating Manitoba's Jennifer Jones in their final round robin game and having the largest comeback in Scotties history, overcoming a seven-point deficit after three ends to defeat Ontario's Danielle Inglis 10–9.

On March 28, 2024, it was announced Koltun would join the Corryn Brown rink out of British Columbia for the 2024–25 season, taking the place of Jennifer Armstrong who decided to focus on mixed doubles. She would play second with Erin Pincott at third and Samantha Fisher at lead. In their first season together, Team Brown won the 2025 BC Women's Curling Championship, qualifying to represent British Columbia at the 2025 Scotties Tournament of Hearts. There, they finished the round robin with a record of 6–2, qualifying for the playoffs where they lost to Nova Scotia's Christina Black 10–5. Team Brown would fail to repeat their provincial title at the 2026 BC Women's Curling Championship, and at the end of the season both Koltun and Fisher would announce that they would be joining as the front-end a new team in Alberta skipped by Kayla Skrlik and two-time Canadian junior champion Myla Plett as third.

== Personal life ==
Koltun is currently a family physician. She is married.

== Teams ==
Season	Skip	Third	Second	Lead	Alternate
2006–07	Chelsea Duncan (Fourth)	Sarah Koltun (Skip)	Tessa Vibe	Linea Eby	
2007–08	Chelsea Duncan (Fourth)	Sarah Koltun (Skip)	Linea Eby	Tessa Vibe	
2008–09	Sarah Koltun	Chelsea Duncan	Linea Eby	Jenna Duncan	
2009–10	Sarah Koltun	Chelsea Duncan	Linea Eby	Jenna Duncan	
2010–11	Sarah Koltun	Chelsea Duncan	Linea Eby	Jenna Duncan	
2011–12	Sarah Koltun	Chelsea Duncan	Linea Eby	Jenna Duncan	
2012–13	Sarah Koltun	Chelsea Duncan	Patty Wallingham	Jenna Duncan	
2013–14	Sarah Koltun	Chelsea Duncan	Patty Wallingham	Andrea Sinclair	Jenna Duncan
2014–15	Sarah Koltun	Chelsea Duncan	Patty Wallingham	Andrea Sinclair	Lindsay Moldowan
2016–17	Sarah Koltun	Chelsea Duncan	Patty Wallingham	Jenna Duncan	Helen Strong (STOH)
2017–18	Kerry Galusha	Sarah Koltun	Megan Koehler	Shona Barbour	
2018–19	Kerry Galusha	Sarah Koltun	Brittany Tran	Shona Barbour	Megan Koehler
2019–20	Kerry Galusha	Sarah Koltun	Jo-Ann Rizzo	Shona Barbour	Stacey Stabel (STOH)
2020–21	Kerry Galusha	Sarah Koltun	Jo-Ann Rizzo	Margot Flemming	
2021–22	Jo-Ann Rizzo (Fourth)	Sarah Koltun	Margot Flemming	Kerry Galusha (Skip)	Megan Koehler
2022–23	Jo-Ann Rizzo (Fourth)	Margot Flemming	Sarah Koltun	Kerry Galusha (Skip)	Megan Koehler
2023–24	Jo-Ann Rizzo (Fourth)	Margot Flemming	Sarah Koltun	Kerry Galusha (Skip)	Shona Barbour
2024–25	Corryn Brown	Erin Pincott	Sarah Koltun	Samantha Fisher	
2025–26	Corryn Brown	Erin Pincott	Sarah Koltun	Samantha Fisher	
2026–27	Kayla Skrlik	Myla Plett	Sarah Koltun	Samantha Fisher	
