= 2015 Northwest Territories Scotties Tournament of Hearts =

- Host city: Yellowknife, Northwest Territories
- Arena: Yellowknife Curling Centre
- Dates: January 8–10
- Winner: Kerry Galusha
- Curling club: Yellowknife CC, Yellowknife
- Skip: Kerry Galusha
- Third: Megan Cormier
- Second: Danielle Derry
- Lead: Shona Barbour
- Finalist: Ann McKellar-Gillis

The 2015 Northwest Territories Scotties Tournament of Hearts, the women's curling championship for the Northwest Territories, was held from January 8 to 10 at the Yellowknife Curling Centre in Yellowknife, Northwest Territories.

2015 marks the first year that the winner of the Northwest Territories Scotties will go directly to the Scotties Tournament of Hearts. In previous years, the top two Northwest Territories teams would have to play in the NWT/Yukon Scotties Tournament of Hearts to earn the right to play at the national championship.

Only two rinks entered, 11-time territorial champion Kerry Galusha and territorial senior champion Ann McKellar-Gillis (both from Yellowknife). Galusha's team won the event, and represented the Northwest Territories at the 2015 Scotties Tournament of Hearts.

== Teams ==
Skip	Third	Second	Lead	Alternate	Club
Kerry Galusha	Megan Cormier	Danielle Derry	Shona Barbour	Sharon Cormier	Yellowknife CC, Yellowknife
Ann McKellar-Gillis	Cheryl Burlington	Cheryl Tordoff	Natalie Kelln		Yellowknife CC, Yellowknife

== Scores ==
The event was a best-of-five tournament. Since the Galusha rink won the first three games, the games scheduled for January 11 were not necessary.

January 8

- Galusha 8-3 McKellar-Gillis

January 10

- Galusha 12-2 McKellar-Gillis
- Galusha 13-4 McKellar-Gillis
