= 2025 Canadian Junior Curling Championships =

2025 New Holland Canadian Under-20 Curling Championships
- Host city: Summerside, Prince Edward Island
- Arena: Consolidated Credit Union Place & Silver Fox Entertainment Complex
- Dates: March 23–30
- Men's winner: Nova Scotia 2
- Curling club: Truro CC, Truro
- Skip: Calan MacIsaac
- Third: Nathan Gray
- Second: Owain Fisher
- Lead: Christopher McCurdy
- Alternate: Nick Mosher
- Coach: Craig Burgess
- Finalist: New Brunswick (Dalrymple)
- Women's winner: Alberta 1
- Curling club: Saville Community SC, Edmonton; Sherwood Park CC, Sherwood Park
- Skip: Myla Plett
- Third: Alyssa Nedohin
- Second: Chloe Fediuk
- Lead: Allie Iskiw
- Coach: David Nedohin
- Finalist: Quebec 1 (Fortin)

The 2025 New Holland Canadian Under-20 Curling Championships were held from March 23 to 30 at the Consolidated Credit Union Place and the Silver Fox Entertainment Complex in Summerside, Prince Edward Island. The winners, Nova Scotia's Calan MacIsaac and Alberta's Myla Plett, earned the right to represent Canada at the 2026 World Junior Curling Championships.

The event featured eighteen teams on both the men's and women's sides, each split into two pools of nine. The top three teams from each pool at the end of the round robin advanced to the playoff round. Based on results from the 2023 and 2024 events, certain provinces earned two berths to the championship. Alberta, British Columbia, Manitoba, Northern Ontario, Nova Scotia and Ontario each earned an extra berth on the men's side, while Alberta, Manitoba, Nova Scotia, Ontario and Quebec got two berths on the women's side The host province, Prince Edward Island, also earned two teams.

This was the second time Summerside played host to the Canadian Under-20 Curling Championships. The city previously held the 2002 championship which was won by Manitoba's David Hamblin and Prince Edward Island's Suzanne Birt.

== Medallists ==
Event	Gold	Silver	Bronze
Men	Nova Scotia 2 Calan MacIsaac; Nathan Gray; Owain Fisher; Christopher McCurdy; Nick Mosher	New Brunswick; Rajan Dalrymple; Noah Riggs; Drew Grattan; Cameron Sallaj	Nova Scotia 1 Zach Atherton; Alan Fawcett; Tyler McMullen; Jed Freeman
Women	Alberta 1 Myla Plett; Alyssa Nedohin; Chloe Fediuk; Allie Iskiw	Quebec 1 Jolianne Fortin; Emy Lafrance; Megan Lafrance; Mégane Fortin	British Columbia; Holly Hafeli; Jorja Kopytko; Gabby Brissette; Natalie Hafeli

== Men ==
=== Teams ===
The teams are listed as follows:

Province / Territory	Skip	Third	Second	Lead	Alternate	Club(s)
Alberta 1	Zachary Davies	Ronan Peterson	William Butler	Lucas Sawiak		Saville Community SC, Edmonton
Alberta 2	Peter Hlushak	Jaxon Hiebert	Varyk Doepker	Parker Harris	Noah Mason-Wood	Crestwood CC, Edmonton; Sherwood Park CC, Sherwood Park
British Columbia 1	Harrison Hrynew	Wesley Wu	Taj McKenzie	Isaac Lauzon		Royal City CC, New Westminster
British Columbia 2	Chris Parkinson	Neil Imada	Miles Reed	Jesse Tiede		Kelowna CC, Kelowna; Royal City CC, New Westminster; Golden Ears WC, Maple Ridge; Comox Valley CC, Comox Valley
Manitoba 1	Jace Freeman	Timothy Marin	Nick Senff	Luke Robins		Virden CC, Virden
Manitoba 2	Nash Sugden	Tyler Fehr	Tanner Treichel	Ryan Thiessen	Quinn Lagace	Morden CC, Morden
New Brunswick	Rajan Dalrymple	Noah Riggs	Drew Grattan	Cameron Sallaj		Gage G&CC, Oromocto
Newfoundland and Labrador	Simon Perry	Nicholas Codner	Brayden Snow	Carter Holden		St. John's CC, St. John's
Northern Ontario 1	Brendan Rajala	Justin MacKay	Ben Miskiw	Jake Clouthier	Kamdyn Julien	Northern Credit Union CC, Sudbury
Northern Ontario 2	Riley Winters	Wesley Decary	Grayson Gribbon	Aidan Baxter		North Bay GC, North Bay
Nova Scotia 1	Zach Atherton	Alan Fawcett	Tyler McMullen	Jed Freeman		Halifax CC, Halifax; Chester CC, Chester
Nova Scotia 2	Calan MacIsaac	Nathan Gray	Owain Fisher	Christopher McCurdy	Nick Mosher	Truro CC, Truro
Ontario 1	Tyler MacTavish	Owen Nicholls	Liam Tardif	Wyatt Wright	Alec Symeonides	KW Granite Club, Waterloo
Ontario 2	Noah Garner	Kyle Stratton	Jackson Dubinsky	Carter Henry	Tyler Smith	Dixie CC, Mississauga
Prince Edward Island 1	Isaiah Dalton	Connor Bruce	Sheamus Herlihy	Nate MacRae		Cornwall CC, Cornwall
Prince Edward Island 2	Jack MacFadyen	Keegan Warnell	Luke Butler	Anderson MacDougall		Cornwall CC, Cornwall; Summerside CC, Summerside
Quebec	Pierre-Olivier Roy	Louis-François Brassard	Jacob Lepage	Thomas Corbeil		CC des Collines, Chelsea
Saskatchewan	Dylan Derksen	Logan Sawicki	Tyler Derksen	Gavin Martens		Martensville CC, Martensville

=== Round robin standings ===
Final Round Robin Standings

Key
Teams to Playoffs

Pool A	Skip	W	L	W–L	DSC
New Brunswick	Rajan Dalrymple	7	1	1–0	378.20
Nova Scotia 2	Calan MacIsaac	7	1	0–1	348.20
Manitoba 1	Jace Freeman	5	3	1–0	440.60
Newfoundland and Labrador	Simon Perry	5	3	0–1	682.20
Northern Ontario 1	Brendan Rajala	4	4	1–0	449.50
Alberta 2	Peter Hlushak	4	4	0–1	464.40
Ontario 2	Noah Garner	2	6	–	976.70
Prince Edward Island 2	Jack MacFadyen	1	7	1–0	564.40
British Columbia 1	Harrison Hrynew	1	7	0–1	702.70

Pool B	Skip	W	L	W–L	DSC
Nova Scotia 1	Zach Atherton	6	2	1–1	363.90
Saskatchewan	Dylan Derksen	6	2	1–1	383.20
Ontario 1	Tyler MacTavish	6	2	1–1	730.30
Alberta 1	Zachary Davies	5	3	–	637.80
British Columbia 2	Chris Parkinson	4	4	–	953.80
Manitoba 2	Nash Sugden	3	5	1–0	1262.30
Prince Edward Island 1	Isaiah Dalton	3	5	0–1	657.40
Quebec	Pierre-Olivier Roy	2	6	–	372.60
Northern Ontario 2	Riley Winters	1	7	–	877.90

Pool A Round Robin Summary Table
Pos.	Team	(Alberta) AB2	(British Columbia) BC1	(Manitoba) MB1	(New Brunswick) NB	(Newfoundland and Labrador) NL	(Northern Ontario) NO1	(Nova Scotia) NS2	(Ontario) ON2	(Prince Edward Island) PE2	Record
6	Alberta 2	—	5–7	11–5	3–5	8–7	5–6	2–8	9–5	9–3	4–4
9	British Columbia 1	7–5	—	2–7	4–9	9–10	1–11	2–11	6–8	4–6	1–7
3	Manitoba 1	5–11	7–2	—	3–5	11–9	11–9	1–9	6–3	9–3	5–3
1	New Brunswick	5–3	9–4	5–3	—	6–8	7–4	8–7	10–3	12–4	7–1
4	Newfoundland and Labrador	7–8	10–9	9–11	8–6	—	14–2	2–10	11–7	14–2	5–3
5	Northern Ontario 1	6–5	11–1	9–11	4–7	2–14	—	4–9	10–4	7–5	4–4
2	Nova Scotia 2	8–2	11–2	9–1	7–8	10–2	9–4	—	8–4	9–2	7–1
7	Ontario 2	5–9	8–6	3–6	3–10	7–11	4–10	4–8	—	10–4	2–6
8	Prince Edward Island 2	3–9	6–4	3–9	4–12	2–14	5–7	2–9	4–10	—	1–7

Pool B Round Robin Summary Table
Pos.	Team	(Alberta) AB1	(British Columbia) BC2	(Manitoba) MB2	(Northern Ontario) NO2	(Nova Scotia) NS1	(Ontario) ON1	(Prince Edward Island) PE1	(Quebec) QC	(Saskatchewan) SK	Record
4	Alberta 1	—	6–3	6–4	7–1	3–7	3–9	5–12	6–3	7–6	5–3
5	British Columbia 2	3–6	—	10–4	8–6	5–12	4–12	10–4	7–6	4–9	4–4
6	Manitoba 2	4–6	4–10	—	8–5	3–8	3–6	7–5	8–7	4–9	3–5
9	Northern Ontario 2	1–7	6–8	5–8	—	9–4	7–9	8–10	2–8	6–9	1–7
1	Nova Scotia 1	7–3	12–5	8–3	4–9	—	7–3	8–3	8–3	6–9	6–2
3	Ontario 1	9–3	12–4	6–3	9–7	3–7	—	17–3	4–10	8–7	6–2
7	Prince Edward Island 1	12–5	4–10	5–7	10–8	3–8	3–17	—	9–3	7–12	3–5
8	Quebec	3–6	6–7	7–8	8–2	3–8	10–4	3–9	—	8–9	2–6
2	Saskatchewan	6–7	9–4	9–4	9–6	9–6	7–8	12–7	9–8	—	6–2

=== Round robin results ===
All draw times are listed in Atlantic Time (UTC−03:00).

==== Draw 1 ====
Sunday, March 23, 4:00 pm

Sheet B	1	2	3	4	5	6	7	8	9	10	Final
Alberta 1 (Davies)	0	1	1	0	0	0	0	1	0	X	3
Nova Scotia 1 (Atherton)	2	0	0	1	3	0	0	0	1	X	7

Sheet C	1	2	3	4	5	6	7	8	9	10	11	Final
Ontario 1 (MacTavish)	0	1	0	0	1	2	0	1	2	0	1	8
Saskatchewan (Derksen)	0	0	3	1	0	0	1	0	0	2	0	7

Sheet D	1	2	3	4	5	6	7	8	9	10	Final
Prince Edward Island 1 (Dalton)	0	3	0	2	0	2	1	0	1	X	9
Quebec (Roy)	0	0	1	0	1	0	0	1	0	X	3

Sheet E	1	2	3	4	5	6	7	8	9	10	Final
Manitoba 2 (Sugden)	2	0	0	2	1	0	1	0	0	2	8
Northern Ontario 2 (Winters)	0	1	1	0	0	1	0	1	1	0	5

Sheet F	1	2	3	4	5	6	7	8	9	10	Final
Manitoba 1 (Freeman)	0	1	1	0	2	0	2	0	5	X	11
Northern Ontario 1 (Rajala)	2	0	0	2	0	1	0	4	0	X	9

Sheet G	1	2	3	4	5	6	7	8	9	10	11	Final
British Columbia 1 (Hrynew)	1	0	0	2	1	0	2	1	0	2	0	9
Newfoundland and Labrador (Perry)	0	4	1	0	0	3	0	0	1	0	1	10

Sheet H	1	2	3	4	5	6	7	8	9	10	11	Final
New Brunswick (Dalrymple)	0	0	1	1	0	0	3	0	0	2	1	8
Nova Scotia 2 (MacIsaac)	0	3	0	0	0	2	0	0	2	0	0	7

Sheet I	1	2	3	4	5	6	7	8	9	10	Final
Alberta 2 (Hlushak)	0	3	0	4	0	0	1	0	1	X	9
Ontario 2 (Garner)	1	0	1	0	1	0	0	2	0	X	5

==== Draw 3 ====
Monday, March 24, 9:00 am

Sheet B	1	2	3	4	5	6	7	8	9	10	Final
Manitoba 2 (Sugden)	0	0	0	0	0	1	0	0	2	X	3
Ontario 1 (MacTavish)	3	0	1	1	0	0	0	1	0	X	6

Sheet C	1	2	3	4	5	6	7	8	9	10	Final
British Columbia 2 (Parkinson)	1	3	0	2	3	0	1	0	X	X	10
Prince Edward Island 1 (Dalton)	0	0	1	0	0	1	0	2	X	X	4

Sheet D	1	2	3	4	5	6	7	8	9	10	Final
Northern Ontario 2 (Winters)	0	0	0	0	1	0	0	0	0	X	1
Alberta 1 (Davies)	0	0	2	0	0	0	2	1	2	X	7

Sheet E	1	2	3	4	5	6	7	8	9	10	Final
Saskatchewan (Derksen)	0	1	0	3	2	2	0	1	0	0	9
Quebec (Roy)	1	0	2	0	0	0	1	0	2	2	8

Sheet F	1	2	3	4	5	6	7	8	9	10	Final
British Columbia 1 (Hrynew)	2	1	0	0	0	1	1	1	0	1	7
Alberta 2 (Hlushak)	0	0	1	1	1	0	0	0	2	0	5

Sheet G	1	2	3	4	5	6	7	8	9	10	Final
Prince Edward Island 2 (MacFadyen)	0	1	0	2	0	1	0	0	X	X	4
New Brunswick (Dalrymple)	2	0	4	0	3	0	0	3	X	X	12

Sheet H	1	2	3	4	5	6	7	8	9	10	Final
Ontario 2 (Garner)	1	0	1	0	0	0	0	2	X	X	4
Northern Ontario 1 (Rajala)	0	0	0	1	4	1	4	0	X	X	10

Sheet I	1	2	3	4	5	6	7	8	9	10	Final
Newfoundland and Labrador (Perry)	0	0	0	0	0	1	1	0	X	X	2
Nova Scotia 2 (MacIsaac)	0	2	3	1	3	0	0	1	X	X	10

==== Draw 5 ====
Monday, March 24, 7:00 pm

Sheet B	1	2	3	4	5	6	7	8	9	10	Final
Newfoundland and Labrador (Perry)	4	1	0	3	0	2	0	0	1	X	11
Ontario 2 (Garner)	0	0	3	0	3	0	0	1	0	X	7

Sheet C	1	2	3	4	5	6	7	8	9	10	Final
Alberta 2 (Hlushak)	0	2	3	0	3	0	3	0	X	X	11
Manitoba 1 (Freeman)	0	0	0	1	0	2	0	2	X	X	5

Sheet D	1	2	3	4	5	6	7	8	9	10	Final
Prince Edward Island 2 (MacFadyen)	1	0	0	0	1	1	1	0	1	1	6
British Columbia 1 (Hrynew)	0	1	1	1	0	0	0	1	0	0	4

Sheet E	1	2	3	4	5	6	7	8	9	10	Final
Northern Ontario 1 (Rajala)	0	0	0	0	2	0	0	2	0	X	4
New Brunswick (Dalrymple)	0	2	0	1	0	2	0	0	2	X	7

Sheet F	1	2	3	4	5	6	7	8	9	10	Final
Saskatchewan (Derksen)	1	2	1	0	1	0	3	0	1	0	9
Northern Ontario 2 (Winters)	0	0	0	1	0	2	0	2	0	1	6

Sheet G	1	2	3	4	5	6	7	8	9	10	Final
Manitoba 2 (Sugden)	0	0	1	0	0	0	1	1	0	X	3
Nova Scotia 1 (Atherton)	0	0	0	2	0	2	0	0	4	X	8

Sheet H	1	2	3	4	5	6	7	8	9	10	Final
British Columbia 2 (Parkinson)	0	0	1	0	1	0	2	0	X	X	4
Ontario 1 (MacTavish)	1	3	0	2	0	1	0	5	X	X	12

Sheet I	1	2	3	4	5	6	7	8	9	10	Final
Alberta 1 (Davies)	1	0	0	1	0	2	0	1	0	X	5
Prince Edward Island 1 (Dalton)	0	3	1	0	2	0	1	0	5	X	12

==== Draw 7 ====
Tuesday, March 25, 2:00 pm

Sheet B	1	2	3	4	5	6	7	8	9	10	Final
Northern Ontario 1 (Rajala)	0	1	0	2	0	0	0	2	1	1	7
Prince Edward Island 2 (MacFadyen)	0	0	1	0	1	1	2	0	0	0	5

Sheet C	1	2	3	4	5	6	7	8	9	10	Final
Ontario 2 (Garner)	0	1	0	0	0	1	0	2	0	X	4
Nova Scotia 2 (MacIsaac)	0	0	2	1	2	0	1	0	2	X	8

Sheet D	1	2	3	4	5	6	7	8	9	10	11	Final
Alberta 2 (Hlushak)	0	2	0	1	0	3	0	0	1	0	1	8
Newfoundland and Labrador (Perry)	1	0	1	0	1	0	0	2	0	2	0	7

Sheet E	1	2	3	4	5	6	7	8	9	10	Final
British Columbia 1 (Hrynew)	0	0	0	0	1	0	1	0	X	X	2
Manitoba 1 (Freeman)	1	0	1	1	0	1	0	3	X	X	7

Sheet F	1	2	3	4	5	6	7	8	9	10	Final
Alberta 1 (Davies)	0	1	0	0	2	0	1	0	1	1	6
British Columbia 2 (Parkinson)	0	0	1	0	0	1	0	1	0	0	3

Sheet G	1	2	3	4	5	6	7	8	9	10	Final
Northern Ontario 2 (Winters)	0	0	1	0	0	0	0	1	0	X	2
Quebec (Roy)	2	0	0	1	1	0	1	0	3	X	8

Sheet H	1	2	3	4	5	6	7	8	9	10	Final
Manitoba 2 (Sugden)	0	0	0	1	0	1	0	2	0	X	4
Saskatchewan (Derksen)	2	1	3	0	1	0	1	0	1	X	9

Sheet I	1	2	3	4	5	6	7	8	9	10	Final
Ontario 1 (MacTavish)	0	0	1	0	0	0	0	2	X	X	3
Nova Scotia 1 (Atherton)	0	2	0	1	1	1	2	0	X	X	7

==== Draw 9 ====
Wednesday, March 26, 9:00 am

Sheet B	1	2	3	4	5	6	7	8	9	10	Final
Ontario 1 (MacTavish)	0	0	2	0	0	2	0	0	X	X	4
Quebec (Roy)	1	0	0	2	2	0	4	1	X	X	10

Sheet C	1	2	3	4	5	6	7	8	9	10	11	Final
Saskatchewan (Derksen)	0	1	0	1	0	1	1	1	0	1	0	6
Alberta 1 (Davies)	0	0	2	0	3	0	0	0	1	0	1	7

Sheet D	1	2	3	4	5	6	7	8	9	10	Final
Nova Scotia 1 (Atherton)	2	2	0	0	2	1	1	0	X	X	8
Prince Edward Island 1 (Dalton)	0	0	0	1	0	0	0	2	X	X	3

Sheet E	1	2	3	4	5	6	7	8	9	10	Final
British Columbia 2 (Parkinson)	0	2	0	2	0	1	1	4	X	X	10
Manitoba 2 (Sugden)	1	0	1	0	2	0	0	0	X	X	4

Sheet F	1	2	3	4	5	6	7	8	9	10	Final
Nova Scotia 2 (MacIsaac)	3	2	0	4	1	0	1	0	X	X	11
British Columbia 1 (Hrynew)	0	0	1	0	0	1	0	0	X	X	2

Sheet G	1	2	3	4	5	6	7	8	9	10	Final
Newfoundland and Labrador (Perry)	3	0	2	3	3	2	0	1	X	X	14
Northern Ontario 1 (Rajala)	0	1	0	0	0	0	1	0	X	X	2

Sheet H	1	2	3	4	5	6	7	8	9	10	Final
Manitoba 1 (Freeman)	0	0	0	1	0	1	1	0	0	X	3
New Brunswick (Dalrymple)	1	0	1	0	1	0	0	1	1	X	5

Sheet I	1	2	3	4	5	6	7	8	9	10	Final
Prince Edward Island 2 (MacFadyen)	0	0	0	1	0	0	0	2	X	X	3
Alberta 2 (Hlushak)	3	1	2	0	2	1	0	0	X	X	9

==== Draw 11 ====
Wednesday, March 26, 7:00 pm

Sheet B	1	2	3	4	5	6	7	8	9	10	Final
Prince Edward Island 1 (Dalton)	2	0	3	1	0	0	1	0	0	X	7
Saskatchewan (Derksen)	0	2	0	0	3	1	0	3	3	X	12

Sheet C	1	2	3	4	5	6	7	8	9	10	Final
Nova Scotia 1 (Atherton)	3	0	2	3	0	0	4	0	X	X	12
British Columbia 2 (Parkinson)	0	1	0	0	1	1	0	2	X	X	5

Sheet D	1	2	3	4	5	6	7	8	9	10	Final
Ontario 1 (MacTavish)	0	0	2	0	0	3	1	1	1	1	9
Northern Ontario 2 (Winters)	0	1	0	4	2	0	0	0	0	0	7

Sheet E	1	2	3	4	5	6	7	8	9	10	Final
Quebec (Roy)	0	0	0	1	0	0	0	2	0	0	3
Alberta 1 (Davies)	0	0	0	0	2	1	0	0	1	2	6

Sheet F	1	2	3	4	5	6	7	8	9	10	11	Final
New Brunswick (Dalrymple)	1	0	1	0	1	1	0	0	1	1	0	6
Newfoundland and Labrador (Perry)	0	2	0	3	0	0	0	1	0	0	2	8

Sheet G	1	2	3	4	5	6	7	8	9	10	Final
Manitoba 1 (Freeman)	4	0	2	0	0	1	1	1	X	X	9
Prince Edward Island 2 (MacFadyen)	0	0	0	1	2	0	0	0	X	X	3

Sheet H	1	2	3	4	5	6	7	8	9	10	Final
British Columbia 1 (Hrynew)	1	0	0	0	2	0	1	1	1	0	6
Ontario 2 (Garner)	0	1	1	1	0	4	0	0	0	1	8

Sheet I	1	2	3	4	5	6	7	8	9	10	Final
Nova Scotia 2 (MacIsaac)	0	2	0	3	0	0	2	0	2	X	9
Northern Ontario 1 (Rajala)	0	0	1	0	0	2	0	1	0	X	4

==== Draw 13 ====
Thursday, March 27, 2:00 pm

Sheet B	1	2	3	4	5	6	7	8	9	10	Final
Ontario 2 (Garner)	0	1	0	0	0	0	0	2	0	X	3
Manitoba 1 (Freeman)	2	0	1	0	1	0	1	0	1	X	6

Sheet C	1	2	3	4	5	6	7	8	9	10	Final
Nova Scotia 2 (MacIsaac)	0	2	1	0	0	0	4	1	X	X	8
Alberta 2 (Hlushak)	1	0	0	1	0	0	0	0	X	X	2

Sheet D	1	2	3	4	5	6	7	8	9	10	Final
Newfoundland and Labrador (Perry)	2	1	4	5	1	0	1	0	X	X	14
Prince Edward Island 2 (MacFadyen)	0	0	0	0	0	1	0	1	X	X	2

Sheet E	1	2	3	4	5	6	7	8	9	10	Final
New Brunswick (Dalrymple)	2	0	2	1	2	0	2	0	X	X	9
British Columbia 1 (Hrynew)	0	1	0	0	0	1	0	2	X	X	4

Sheet F	1	2	3	4	5	6	7	8	9	10	Final
Northern Ontario 2 (Winters)	2	0	1	1	1	0	1	3	X	X	9
Nova Scotia 1 (Atherton)	0	3	0	0	0	1	0	0	X	X	4

Sheet G	1	2	3	4	5	6	7	8	9	10	11	Final
Quebec (Roy)	2	0	0	1	0	1	0	2	1	0	0	7
Manitoba 2 (Sugden)	0	2	1	0	2	0	1	0	0	1	1	8

Sheet H	1	2	3	4	5	6	7	8	9	10	Final
Saskatchewan (Derksen)	1	1	2	0	0	1	2	0	2	X	9
British Columbia 2 (Parkinson)	0	0	0	3	0	0	0	1	0	X	4

Sheet I	1	2	3	4	5	6	7	8	9	10	Final
Prince Edward Island 1 (Dalton)	0	2	0	0	0	0	0	1	X	X	3
Ontario 1 (MacTavish)	2	0	3	2	6	2	2	0	X	X	17

==== Draw 15 ====
Friday, March 28, 9:00 am

Sheet B	1	2	3	4	5	6	7	8	9	10	Final
British Columbia 2 (Parkinson)	0	3	1	0	1	0	1	0	0	1	7
Quebec (Roy)	2	0	0	1	0	1	0	2	0	0	6

Sheet C	1	2	3	4	5	6	7	8	9	10	Final
Prince Edward Island 1 (Dalton)	2	1	0	3	1	0	2	0	0	1	10
Northern Ontario 2 (Winters)	0	0	1	0	0	4	0	2	1	0	8

Sheet D	1	2	3	4	5	6	7	8	9	10	Final
Alberta 1 (Davies)	0	0	2	0	1	0	0	3	0	X	6
Manitoba 2 (Sugden)	0	1	0	1	0	0	1	0	1	X	4

Sheet E	1	2	3	4	5	6	7	8	9	10	Final
Nova Scotia 1 (Atherton)	1	0	2	0	1	0	2	0	0	X	6
Saskatchewan (Derksen)	0	1	0	1	0	3	0	1	3	X	9

Sheet F	1	2	3	4	5	6	7	8	9	10	Final
Prince Edward Island 2 (MacFadyen)	0	1	0	0	0	0	1	0	0	X	2
Nova Scotia 2 (MacIsaac)	3	0	1	0	0	0	0	2	3	X	9

Sheet G	1	2	3	4	5	6	7	8	9	10	Final
New Brunswick (Dalrymple)	3	0	3	0	0	2	0	2	X	X	10
Ontario 2 (Garner)	0	1	0	1	0	0	1	0	X	X	3

Sheet H	1	2	3	4	5	6	7	8	9	10	Final
Northern Ontario 1 (Rajala)	1	1	0	1	1	0	1	0	0	1	6
Alberta 2 (Hlushak)	0	0	2	0	0	1	0	1	1	0	5

Sheet I	1	2	3	4	5	6	7	8	9	10	Final
Manitoba 1 (Freeman)	0	2	0	2	3	0	2	0	1	1	11
Newfoundland and Labrador (Perry)	1	0	3	0	0	3	0	2	0	0	9

==== Draw 17 ====
Friday, March 28, 7:00 pm

Sheet B	1	2	3	4	5	6	7	8	9	10	11	Final
Alberta 2 (Hlushak)	0	0	0	1	0	1	0	0	0	1	0	3
New Brunswick (Dalrymple)	0	0	1	0	1	0	0	1	0	0	2	5

Sheet C	1	2	3	4	5	6	7	8	9	10	Final
British Columbia 1 (Hrynew)	1	0	0	0	0	0	0	0	X	X	1
Northern Ontario 1 (Rajala)	0	2	0	2	2	2	1	2	X	X	11

Sheet D	1	2	3	4	5	6	7	8	9	10	Final
Manitoba 1 (Freeman)	0	0	0	0	0	0	1	0	X	X	1
Nova Scotia 2 (MacIsaac)	0	0	0	0	1	3	0	5	X	X	9

Sheet E	1	2	3	4	5	6	7	8	9	10	Final
Ontario 2 (Garner)	0	0	4	0	0	0	3	0	3	X	10
Prince Edward Island 2 (MacFadyen)	1	0	0	0	1	0	0	2	0	X	4

Sheet F	1	2	3	4	5	6	7	8	9	10	Final
Manitoba 2 (Sugden)	1	0	0	0	3	0	1	1	0	1	7
Prince Edward Island 1 (Dalton)	0	1	0	0	0	3	0	0	1	0	5

Sheet G	1	2	3	4	5	6	7	8	9	10	Final
Alberta 1 (Davies)	0	1	0	0	0	1	0	1	X	X	3
Ontario 1 (MacTavish)	1	0	4	2	2	0	0	0	X	X	9

Sheet H	1	2	3	4	5	6	7	8	9	10	Final
Quebec (Roy)	1	0	0	1	0	0	1	0	X	X	3
Nova Scotia 1 (Atherton)	0	2	1	0	2	2	0	1	X	X	8

Sheet I	1	2	3	4	5	6	7	8	9	10	Final
Northern Ontario 2 (Winters)	0	2	0	0	1	0	1	0	2	X	6
British Columbia 2 (Parkinson)	2	0	1	1	0	2	0	2	0	X	8

=== Playoffs ===
Quarterfinals
B2	Saskatchewan	8
A3	Manitoba 1	5
A2	Nova Scotia 2	9
B3	Ontario 1	3

Semifinals
A1	New Brunswick	11
B2	Saskatchewan	4
B1	Nova Scotia 1	3
A2	Nova Scotia 2	11

Final
A1	New Brunswick	2
A2	Nova Scotia 2	7
Bronze medal game
B2	Saskatchewan	9
B1	Nova Scotia 1	10

==== Quarterfinals ====
Saturday, March 29, 1:00 pm

Sheet C	1	2	3	4	5	6	7	8	9	10	Final
Nova Scotia 2 (MacIsaac)	2	2	0	0	2	0	0	1	2	X	9
Ontario 1 (MacTavish)	0	0	0	1	0	1	1	0	0	X	3

Sheet D	1	2	3	4	5	6	7	8	9	10	Final
Saskatchewan (Derksen)	0	0	2	2	1	0	2	0	0	1	8
Manitoba 1 (Freeman)	0	1	0	0	0	2	0	1	1	0	5

==== Semifinals ====
Saturday, March 29, 7:00 pm

Sheet C	1	2	3	4	5	6	7	8	9	10	Final
Nova Scotia 1 (Atherton)	0	0	2	0	0	0	1	0	X	X	3
Nova Scotia 2 (MacIsaac)	1	2	0	3	1	1	0	3	X	X	11

Sheet E	1	2	3	4	5	6	7	8	9	10	Final
New Brunswick (Dalrymple)	1	2	0	0	3	1	1	0	3	X	11
Saskatchewan (Derksen)	0	0	0	2	0	0	0	2	0	X	4

==== Bronze medal game ====
Sunday, March 30, 11:00 am

Sheet B	1	2	3	4	5	6	7	8	9	10	Final
Saskatchewan (Derksen)	0	1	0	2	3	1	1	0	1	0	9
Nova Scotia 1 (Atherton)	3	0	4	0	0	0	0	2	0	1	10

==== Final ====
Sunday, March 30, 11:00 am

Sheet C	1	2	3	4	5	6	7	8	9	10	Final
New Brunswick (Dalrymple)	1	0	0	0	1	0	0	0	0	X	2
Nova Scotia 2 (MacIsaac)	0	0	3	0	0	1	2	0	1	X	7

=== Final standings ===
Place	Team
1st place, gold medalist(s)	Nova Scotia 2
2nd place, silver medalist(s)	New Brunswick
3rd place, bronze medalist(s)	Nova Scotia 1
4	Saskatchewan
5	Manitoba 1
6	Ontario 1
7	Alberta 1
8	Newfoundland and Labrador
9	Northern Ontario 1
10	British Columbia 2
11	Alberta 2
12	Manitoba 2
13	Prince Edward Island 1
14	Ontario 2
15	Quebec
16	Prince Edward Island 2
17	British Columbia 1
18	Northern Ontario 2

== Women ==
=== Teams ===
The teams are listed as follows:

Province / Territory	Skip	Third	Second	Lead	Alternate	Club(s)
Alberta 1	Myla Plett	Alyssa Nedohin	Chloe Fediuk	Allie Iskiw		Saville Community SC, Edmonton; Sherwood Park CC, Sherwood Park
Alberta 2	Gracelyn Richards	Emma Yarmuch	Sophie Ryhorchuk	Rachel Jacques	Amy Wheatcroft	Saville Community SC, Edmonton
British Columbia	Holly Hafeli	Jorja Kopytko	Gabby Brissette	Natalie Hafeli		Kamloops CC, Kamloops
Manitoba 1	Shaela Hayward	Grace Beaudry	Keira Krahn	Emily Ostrowsky		Carman CC, Carman
Manitoba 2	Cassidy Dundas	Lauren Evason	Eryn Czirfusz	Tessa Terrick		Heather CC, Winnipeg
New Brunswick	Mélodie Forsythe	Rebecca Watson	Carly Smith	Mya Pugsley		Capital WC, Fredericton; Curl Moncton, Moncton
Newfoundland and Labrador	Cailey Locke	Hayley Gushue	Sitaye Penney	Izzy Paterson		St. John's CC, St. John's
Northern Ontario	Mia Toner	Dayna Wahl	Justine Toner	Samantha Digiglio		Northern Credit Union CC, Sudbury
Northwest Territories	Sydney Galusha	Ella Skauge	Mackenzie Chiasson	Brynn Chorostkowski		Yellowknife CC, Yellowknife
Nova Scotia 1	Rebecca Regan	Olivia McDonah	Rya Leonard	Ella Kinley		Lakeshore CC, Lower Sackville
Nova Scotia 2	Kate Weissent	Cerys Fisher	Alexis Cluney	Grace Adams		Halifax CC, Halifax
Ontario 1	Dominique Vivier	Brooklyn Ideson	Scotia Maltman	Clara Dissanayake		Navan CC, Navan
Ontario 2	Katrina Frlan	Erika Wainwright	Samantha Wall	Lauren Norman	Sydney Anderson	Huntley CC, Carp
Prince Edward Island 1	Sophie Blades	Ella Lenentine	Makiya Noonan	Reid Hart		Cornwall CC, Cornwall; Summerside CC, Summerside; West Prince CC, Bloomfield
Prince Edward Island 2	Sydney Carver	Katie MacLean	Michaela MacLean	Maddy MacDonald		Montague CC, Montague
Quebec 1	Jolianne Fortin	Emy Lafrance	Megan Lafrance	Mégane Fortin		CC Kénogami, Jonquière
Quebec 2	Anne-Sophie Gionest	Sarah Bergeron	Sarah-Ann Daigle	Juliette Bergeron		CC Riverbend, Alma; CC Etchemin, Saint-Romuald
Saskatchewan	Ava Beausoleil	Annika Steckler	Leah Beausoleil	Mya Silversides	Hannah Rugg	Nutana CC, Saskatoon

=== Round robin standings ===
Final Round Robin Standings

Key
Teams to Playoffs

Pool A	Skip	W	L	W–L	DSC
Quebec 1	Jolianne Fortin	6	2	2–1; 1–0	550.00
Nova Scotia 1	Rebecca Regan	6	2	2–1; 0–1	545.20
British Columbia	Holly Hafeli	6	2	1–2; 1–0	574.50
Alberta 2	Gracelyn Richards	6	2	1–2; 0–1	836.40
Ontario 2	Katrina Frlan	5	3	–	861.40
Manitoba 1	Shaela Hayward	3	5	1–0	556.20
Northern Ontario	Mia Toner	3	5	0–1	1475.90
Northwest Territories	Sydney Galusha	1	7	–	1196.50
Prince Edward Island 2	Sydney Carver	0	8	–	1233.30

Pool B	Skip	W	L	W–L	DSC
Alberta 1	Myla Plett	7	1	1–1	506.10
New Brunswick	Mélodie Forsythe	7	1	1–1	978.10
Manitoba 2	Cassidy Dundas	7	1	1–1	1007.90
Ontario 1	Dominique Vivier	5	3	–	634.10
Nova Scotia 2	Kate Weissent	3	5	1–1	585.90
Quebec 2	Anne-Sophie Gionest	3	5	1–1	734.10
Newfoundland and Labrador	Cailey Locke	3	5	1–1	872.10
Saskatchewan	Ava Beausoleil	1	7	–	1007.40
Prince Edward Island 1	Sophie Blades	0	8	–	792.70

Pool A Round Robin Summary Table
Pos.	Team	(Alberta) AB2	(British Columbia) BC	(Manitoba) MB1	(Northern Ontario) NO	(Northwest Territories) NT	(Nova Scotia) NS1	(Ontario) ON2	(Prince Edward Island) PE2	(Quebec) QC1	Record
4	Alberta 2	—	5–8	8–5	10–6	10–3	7–9	9–3	17–3	7–6	6–2
3	British Columbia	8–5	—	8–4	7–4	15–4	5–7	7–6	6–5	8–9	6–2
6	Manitoba 1	5–8	4–8	—	13–4	9–4	5–9	5–8	12–6	2–9	3–5
7	Northern Ontario	6–10	4–7	4–13	—	10–3	3–8	7–4	7–1	3–10	3–5
8	Northwest Territories	3–10	4–15	4–9	3–10	—	4–8	4–10	9–3	5–15	1–7
2	Nova Scotia 1	9–7	7–5	9–5	8–3	8–4	—	2–10	8–5	7–9	6–2
5	Ontario 2	3–9	6–7	8–5	4–7	10–4	10–2	—	11–3	10–9	5–3
9	Prince Edward Island 2	3–17	5–6	6–12	1–7	3–9	5–8	3–11	—	2–8	0–8
1	Quebec 1	6–7	9–8	9–2	10–3	15–5	9–7	9–10	8–2	—	6–2

Pool B Round Robin Summary Table
Pos.	Team	(Alberta) AB1	(Manitoba) MB2	(New Brunswick) NB	(Newfoundland and Labrador) NL	(Nova Scotia) NS2	(Ontario) ON1	(Prince Edward Island) PE1	(Quebec) QC2	(Saskatchewan) SK	Record
1	Alberta 1	—	12–5	5–7	10–6	8–1	8–4	8–7	9–2	10–6	7–1
3	Manitoba 2	5–12	—	9–6	6–5	9–3	9–5	7–5	8–3	8–5	7–1
2	New Brunswick	7–5	6–9	—	8–6	8–7	6–5	11–2	8–5	10–5	7–1
7	Newfoundland and Labrador	6–10	5–6	6–8	—	5–10	6–8	5–3	8–6	10–4	3–5
5	Nova Scotia 2	1–8	3–9	7–8	10–5	—	1–8	7–6	7–11	8–5	3–5
4	Ontario 1	4–8	5–9	5–6	8–6	8–1	—	8–4	10–4	11–4	5–3
9	Prince Edward Island 1	7–8	5–7	2–11	3–5	6–7	4–8	—	5–10	6–9	0–8
6	Quebec 2	2–9	3–8	5–8	6–8	11–7	4–10	10–5	—	11–4	3–5
8	Saskatchewan	6–10	5–8	5–10	4–10	5–8	4–11	9–6	4–11	—	1–7

=== Round robin results ===
All draw times are listed in Atlantic Time (UTC−03:00).

==== Draw 2 ====
Sunday, March 23, 9:00 pm

Sheet B	1	2	3	4	5	6	7	8	9	10	Final
Manitoba 1 (Hayward)	1	0	1	1	0	2	0	0	0	X	5
Nova Scotia 1 (Regan)	0	2	0	0	3	0	2	1	1	X	9

Sheet C	1	2	3	4	5	6	7	8	9	10	Final
Quebec 1 (Fortin)	0	1	3	0	1	0	1	1	0	2	9
British Columbia (Hafeli)	1	0	0	3	0	2	0	0	2	0	8

Sheet D	1	2	3	4	5	6	7	8	9	10	Final
Northern Ontario (Toner)	0	0	1	2	2	3	0	0	2	X	10
Northwest Territories (Galusha)	0	0	0	0	0	0	2	1	0	X	3

Sheet E	1	2	3	4	5	6	7	8	9	10	Final
Alberta 2 (Richards)	0	2	1	1	0	2	0	2	1	X	9
Ontario 2 (Frlan)	0	0	0	0	2	0	1	0	0	X	3

Sheet F	1	2	3	4	5	6	7	8	9	10	Final
Alberta 1 (Plett)	1	0	0	1	0	4	0	0	2	X	8
Ontario 1 (Vivier)	0	0	2	0	1	0	0	1	0	X	4

Sheet G	1	2	3	4	5	6	7	8	9	10	Final
Newfoundland and Labrador (Locke)	2	0	1	0	2	0	0	0	1	0	6
New Brunswick (Forsythe)	0	2	0	1	0	3	0	0	0	2	8

Sheet H	1	2	3	4	5	6	7	8	9	10	Final
Prince Edward Island 1 (Blades)	0	0	2	0	0	2	0	2	0	X	6
Saskatchewan (Beausoleil)	1	1	0	1	2	0	1	0	3	X	9

Sheet I	1	2	3	4	5	6	7	8	9	10	Final
Nova Scotia 2 (Weissent)	0	2	0	0	1	0	0	0	X	X	3
Manitoba 2 (Dundas)	1	0	1	1	0	2	1	3	X	X	9

==== Draw 4 ====
Monday, March 24, 2:00 pm

Sheet B	1	2	3	4	5	6	7	8	9	10	Final
Alberta 2 (Richards)	1	0	0	3	0	2	1	0	0	0	7
Quebec 1 (Fortin)	0	0	1	0	1	0	0	2	1	1	6

Sheet C	1	2	3	4	5	6	7	8	9	10	Final
Prince Edward Island 2 (Carver)	0	0	0	1	0	0	0	0	X	X	1
Northern Ontario (Toner)	0	1	0	0	3	1	0	2	X	X	7

Sheet D	1	2	3	4	5	6	7	8	9	10	Final
Ontario 2 (Frlan)	1	0	0	1	1	0	1	0	2	2	8
Manitoba 1 (Hayward)	0	2	1	0	0	1	0	1	0	0	5

Sheet E	1	2	3	4	5	6	7	8	9	10	Final
British Columbia (Hafeli)	2	2	4	0	5	0	2	0	0	X	15
Northwest Territories (Galusha)	0	0	0	1	0	1	0	2	0	X	4

Sheet F	1	2	3	4	5	6	7	8	9	10	Final
Newfoundland and Labrador (Locke)	1	0	0	2	0	0	2	0	X	X	5
Nova Scotia 2 (Weissent)	0	2	2	0	2	1	0	3	X	X	10

Sheet G	1	2	3	4	5	6	7	8	9	10	Final
Quebec 2 (Gionest)	5	1	0	0	2	0	2	0	X	X	10
Prince Edward Island 1 (Blades)	0	0	1	1	0	2	0	1	X	X	5

Sheet H	1	2	3	4	5	6	7	8	9	10	Final
Manitoba 2 (Dundas)	1	0	2	0	1	0	1	1	0	3	9
Ontario 1 (Vivier)	0	2	0	0	0	1	0	0	2	0	5

Sheet I	1	2	3	4	5	6	7	8	9	10	Final
New Brunswick (Forsythe)	0	2	0	2	1	0	1	0	4	X	10
Saskatchewan (Beausoleil)	1	0	1	0	0	2	0	1	0	X	5

==== Draw 6 ====
Tuesday, March 25, 9:00 am

Sheet B	1	2	3	4	5	6	7	8	9	10	Final
New Brunswick (Forsythe)	0	2	0	1	0	2	0	1	0	0	6
Manitoba 2 (Dundas)	0	0	1	0	4	0	1	0	1	2	9

Sheet C	1	2	3	4	5	6	7	8	9	10	Final
Nova Scotia 2 (Weissent)	0	1	0	0	0	0	0	0	X	X	1
Alberta 1 (Plett)	3	0	2	1	1	0	0	1	X	X	8

Sheet D	1	2	3	4	5	6	7	8	9	10	Final
Quebec 2 (Gionest)	0	2	0	0	0	0	1	0	3	0	6
Newfoundland and Labrador (Locke)	1	0	0	1	1	2	0	1	0	2	8

Sheet E	1	2	3	4	5	6	7	8	9	10	Final
Ontario 1 (Vivier)	0	2	0	1	0	1	0	4	0	X	8
Prince Edward Island 1 (Blades)	0	0	1	0	1	0	0	0	2	X	4

Sheet F	1	2	3	4	5	6	7	8	9	10	11	Final
British Columbia (Hafeli)	2	0	0	0	2	0	0	2	0	0	1	7
Ontario 2 (Frlan)	0	0	2	0	0	0	1	0	2	1	0	6

Sheet G	1	2	3	4	5	6	7	8	9	10	11	Final
Alberta 2 (Richards)	0	0	3	0	2	0	0	1	0	1	0	7
Nova Scotia 1 (Regan)	2	0	0	2	0	0	2	0	1	0	2	9

Sheet H	1	2	3	4	5	6	7	8	9	10	Final
Prince Edward Island 2 (Carver)	0	0	0	0	0	1	0	1	X	X	2
Quebec 1 (Fortin)	1	1	2	2	1	0	1	0	X	X	8

Sheet I	1	2	3	4	5	6	7	8	9	10	Final
Manitoba 1 (Hayward)	2	0	2	0	4	0	1	4	X	X	13
Northern Ontario (Toner)	0	2	0	1	0	1	0	0	X	X	4

==== Draw 8 ====
Tuesday, March 25, 7:00 pm

Sheet B	1	2	3	4	5	6	7	8	9	10	Final
Ontario 1 (Vivier)	1	0	1	1	1	0	5	1	X	X	10
Quebec 2 (Gionest)	0	3	0	0	0	1	0	0	X	X	4

Sheet C	1	2	3	4	5	6	7	8	9	10	Final
Manitoba 2 (Dundas)	0	2	0	0	2	0	2	0	2	X	8
Saskatchewan (Beausoleil)	1	0	0	2	0	1	0	1	0	X	5

Sheet D	1	2	3	4	5	6	7	8	9	10	Final
Nova Scotia 2 (Weissent)	0	1	0	2	0	0	1	0	1	2	7
New Brunswick (Forsythe)	1	0	3	0	2	0	0	2	0	0	8

Sheet E	1	2	3	4	5	6	7	8	9	10	Final
Newfoundland and Labrador (Locke)	0	2	0	2	0	1	0	1	0	X	6
Alberta 1 (Plett)	2	0	2	0	1	0	2	0	3	X	10

Sheet F	1	2	3	4	5	6	7	8	9	10	Final
Manitoba 1 (Hayward)	2	2	0	0	5	0	1	0	2	X	12
Prince Edward Island 2 (Carver)	0	0	2	1	0	1	0	2	0	X	6

Sheet G	1	2	3	4	5	6	7	8	9	10	Final
Ontario 2 (Frlan)	5	1	2	1	0	1	0	0	X	X	10
Northwest Territories (Galusha)	0	0	0	0	1	0	1	2	X	X	4

Sheet H	1	2	3	4	5	6	7	8	9	10	Final
Alberta 2 (Richards)	0	1	0	0	3	0	0	0	1	X	5
British Columbia (Hafeli)	1	0	4	1	0	1	0	1	0	X	8

Sheet I	1	2	3	4	5	6	7	8	9	10	Final
Quebec 1 (Fortin)	4	0	0	0	1	0	1	1	0	2	9
Nova Scotia 1 (Regan)	0	2	1	1	0	1	0	0	2	0	7

==== Draw 10 ====
Wednesday, March 26, 2:00 pm

Sheet B	1	2	3	4	5	6	7	8	9	10	Final
Northwest Territories (Galusha)	0	0	2	0	1	0	0	2	X	X	5
Quebec 1 (Fortin)	3	1	0	5	0	4	2	0	X	X	15

Sheet C	1	2	3	4	5	6	7	8	9	10	Final
British Columbia (Hafeli)	0	1	2	0	2	0	0	1	2	X	8
Manitoba 1 (Hayward)	0	0	0	3	0	1	0	0	0	X	4

Sheet D	1	2	3	4	5	6	7	8	9	10	Final
Nova Scotia 1 (Regan)	1	0	1	0	1	1	2	1	1	X	8
Northern Ontario (Toner)	0	1	0	2	0	0	0	0	0	X	3

Sheet E	1	2	3	4	5	6	7	8	9	10	Final
Prince Edward Island 2 (Carver)	0	1	0	1	1	0	0	0	X	X	2
Alberta 2 (Richards)	5	0	3	0	0	2	3	4	X	X	17

Sheet F	1	2	3	4	5	6	7	8	9	10	Final
Saskatchewan (Beausoleil)	0	2	0	0	0	1	1	0	X	X	4
Newfoundland and Labrador (Locke)	2	0	1	2	1	0	0	4	X	X	10

Sheet G	1	2	3	4	5	6	7	8	9	10	Final
New Brunswick (Forsythe)	2	0	0	1	0	1	0	0	0	2	6
Ontario 1 (Vivier)	0	1	1	0	0	0	0	2	1	0	5

Sheet H	1	2	3	4	5	6	7	8	9	10	Final
Alberta 1 (Plett)	0	1	0	1	2	0	3	0	0	1	8
Prince Edward Island 1 (Blades)	0	0	2	0	0	2	0	3	0	0	7

Sheet I	1	2	3	4	5	6	7	8	9	10	Final
Quebec 2 (Gionest)	2	0	3	2	0	1	0	0	0	3	11
Nova Scotia 2 (Weissent)	0	1	0	0	2	0	2	1	1	0	7

==== Draw 12 ====
Thursday, March 27, 9:00 am

Sheet B	1	2	3	4	5	6	7	8	9	10	Final
Northern Ontario (Toner)	0	0	1	0	1	1	0	1	0	0	4
British Columbia (Hafeli)	0	1	0	2	0	0	1	0	0	3	7

Sheet C	1	2	3	4	5	6	7	8	9	10	Final
Nova Scotia 1 (Regan)	0	1	0	3	0	0	1	1	2	X	8
Prince Edward Island 2 (Carver)	1	0	1	0	2	1	0	0	0	X	5

Sheet D	1	2	3	4	5	6	7	8	9	10	Final
Quebec 1 (Fortin)	0	1	0	2	0	1	1	0	4	0	9
Ontario 2 (Frlan)	0	0	4	0	2	0	0	1	0	3	10

Sheet E	1	2	3	4	5	6	7	8	9	10	Final
Northwest Territories (Galusha)	1	0	0	1	0	0	1	0	1	X	4
Manitoba 1 (Hayward)	0	3	3	0	2	0	0	1	0	X	9

Sheet F	1	2	3	4	5	6	7	8	9	10	Final
Prince Edward Island 1 (Blades)	0	0	0	1	0	0	0	1	X	X	2
New Brunswick (Forsythe)	4	1	2	0	2	1	1	0	X	X	11

Sheet G	1	2	3	4	5	6	7	8	9	10	Final
Alberta 1 (Plett)	1	1	2	0	3	1	1	0	X	X	9
Quebec 2 (Gionest)	0	0	0	1	0	0	0	1	X	X	2

Sheet H	1	2	3	4	5	6	7	8	9	10	11	Final
Newfoundland and Labrador (Locke)	0	0	1	0	2	0	1	0	1	0	0	5
Manitoba 2 (Dundas)	0	0	0	1	0	1	0	2	0	1	1	6

Sheet I	1	2	3	4	5	6	7	8	9	10	Final
Saskatchewan (Beausoleil)	0	1	0	1	1	0	0	1	0	X	4
Ontario 1 (Vivier)	2	0	2	0	0	1	1	0	5	X	11

==== Draw 14 ====
Thursday, March 27, 7:00 pm

Sheet B	1	2	3	4	5	6	7	8	9	10	Final
Manitoba 2 (Dundas)	0	3	0	0	0	2	0	0	X	X	5
Alberta 1 (Plett)	1	0	3	0	1	0	5	2	X	X	12

Sheet C	1	2	3	4	5	6	7	8	9	10	Final
Saskatchewan (Beausoleil)	0	1	0	0	1	0	0	1	2	0	5
Nova Scotia 2 (Weissent)	1	0	1	2	0	1	1	0	0	2	8

Sheet D	1	2	3	4	5	6	7	8	9	10	Final
New Brunswick (Forsythe)	0	1	0	1	0	3	1	1	0	1	8
Quebec 2 (Gionest)	0	0	2	0	1	0	0	0	2	0	5

Sheet E	1	2	3	4	5	6	7	8	9	10	Final
Prince Edward Island 1 (Blades)	0	0	0	1	0	0	1	0	1	X	3
Newfoundland and Labrador (Locke)	0	0	2	0	1	1	0	1	0	X	5

Sheet F	1	2	3	4	5	6	7	8	9	10	Final
Ontario 2 (Frlan)	0	2	0	2	1	1	4	0	X	X	10
Nova Scotia 1 (Regan)	0	0	1	0	0	0	0	1	X	X	2

Sheet G	1	2	3	4	5	6	7	8	9	10	Final
Northwest Territories (Galusha)	0	0	1	0	1	0	0	1	X	X	3
Alberta 2 (Richards)	3	2	0	2	0	1	2	0	X	X	10

Sheet H	1	2	3	4	5	6	7	8	9	10	Final
British Columbia (Hafeli)	0	0	1	0	2	1	1	1	0	0	6
Prince Edward Island 2 (Carver)	0	1	0	1	0	0	0	0	2	1	5

Sheet I	1	2	3	4	5	6	7	8	9	10	Final
Northern Ontario (Toner)	0	0	1	0	0	1	0	1	X	X	3
Quebec 1 (Fortin)	2	2	0	3	1	0	2	0	X	X	10

==== Draw 16 ====
Friday, March 28, 2:00 pm

Sheet B	1	2	3	4	5	6	7	8	9	10	Final
Northwest Territories (Galusha)	1	2	0	2	2	0	0	2	X	X	9
Prince Edward Island 2 (Carver)	0	0	2	0	0	0	1	0	X	X	3

Sheet C	1	2	3	4	5	6	7	8	9	10	Final
Northern Ontario (Toner)	0	1	0	0	2	1	1	1	0	1	7
Ontario 2 (Frlan)	1	0	1	0	0	0	0	0	2	0	4

Sheet D	1	2	3	4	5	6	7	8	9	10	Final
Manitoba 1 (Hayward)	0	0	0	2	0	0	1	0	2	0	5
Alberta 2 (Richards)	0	0	1	0	2	1	0	2	0	2	8

Sheet E	1	2	3	4	5	6	7	8	9	10	Final
Nova Scotia 1 (Regan)	0	0	1	2	1	0	1	0	0	2	7
British Columbia (Hafeli)	0	1	0	0	0	1	0	2	1	0	5

Sheet F	1	2	3	4	5	6	7	8	9	10	Final
Quebec 2 (Gionest)	3	1	0	4	2	0	1	0	X	X	11
Saskatchewan (Beausoleil)	0	0	2	0	0	1	0	1	X	X	4

Sheet G	1	2	3	4	5	6	7	8	9	10	Final
Prince Edward Island 1 (Blades)	1	0	1	0	3	0	0	0	0	X	5
Manitoba 2 (Dundas)	0	1	0	1	0	1	1	2	1	X	7

Sheet H	1	2	3	4	5	6	7	8	9	10	Final
Ontario 1 (Vivier)	0	2	1	0	3	1	0	1	X	X	8
Nova Scotia 2 (Weissent)	0	0	0	1	0	0	0	0	X	X	1

Sheet I	1	2	3	4	5	6	7	8	9	10	Final
Alberta 1 (Plett)	0	0	1	0	2	0	0	1	1	0	5
New Brunswick (Forsythe)	1	0	0	1	0	2	2	0	0	1	7

==== Draw 18 ====
Saturday, March 29, 9:00 am

Sheet B	1	2	3	4	5	6	7	8	9	10	11	Final
Nova Scotia 2 (Weissent)	1	0	0	1	0	1	1	0	0	2	1	7
Prince Edward Island 1 (Blades)	0	0	1	0	1	0	0	3	1	0	0	6

Sheet C	1	2	3	4	5	6	7	8	9	10	Final
Ontario 1 (Vivier)	0	0	4	0	3	0	0	0	0	1	8
Newfoundland and Labrador (Locke)	0	2	0	1	0	0	0	2	1	0	6

Sheet D	1	2	3	4	5	6	7	8	9	10	Final
Alberta 1 (Plett)	3	0	0	2	1	0	0	0	1	3	10
Saskatchewan (Beausoleil)	0	2	0	0	0	2	1	1	0	0	6

Sheet E	1	2	3	4	5	6	7	8	9	10	Final
Quebec 2 (Gionest)	0	0	2	0	0	0	1	0	X	X	3
Manitoba 2 (Dundas)	3	0	0	0	1	2	0	2	X	X	8

Sheet F	1	2	3	4	5	6	7	8	9	10	Final
Alberta 2 (Richards)	0	2	1	0	0	4	0	0	3	X	10
Northern Ontario (Toner)	3	0	0	1	1	0	0	1	0	X	6

Sheet G	1	2	3	4	5	6	7	8	9	10	Final
Manitoba 1 (Hayward)	0	0	1	0	0	0	1	0	X	X	2
Quebec 1 (Fortin)	0	1	0	4	2	1	0	1	X	X	9

Sheet H	1	2	3	4	5	6	7	8	9	10	Final
Northwest Territories (Galusha)	0	0	1	1	0	1	0	1	0	X	4
Nova Scotia 1 (Regan)	0	2	0	0	1	0	1	0	4	X	8

Sheet I	1	2	3	4	5	6	7	8	9	10	Final
Ontario 2 (Frlan)	2	0	3	0	2	0	2	2	X	X	11
Prince Edward Island 2 (Carver)	0	1	0	1	0	1	0	0	X	X	3

=== Playoffs ===
Quarterfinals
B2	New Brunswick	6
A3	British Columbia	7
A2	Nova Scotia 1	8
B3	Manitoba 2	5

Semifinals
A1	Quebec 1	6
A3	British Columbia	5
B1	Alberta 1	10
A2	Nova Scotia 1	3

Final
A1	Quebec 1	3
B1	Alberta 1	9
Bronze medal game
A3	British Columbia	6
A2	Nova Scotia 1	5

==== Quarterfinals ====
Saturday, March 29, 7:00 pm

Sheet B	1	2	3	4	5	6	7	8	9	10	11	Final
New Brunswick (Forsythe)	0	0	2	0	2	0	1	0	0	1	0	6
British Columbia (Hafeli)	1	0	0	1	0	1	0	1	2	0	1	7

Sheet D	1	2	3	4	5	6	7	8	9	10	Final
Nova Scotia 1 (Regan)	0	1	2	1	0	0	0	4	0	X	8
Manitoba 2 (Dundas)	0	0	0	0	2	1	1	0	1	X	5

==== Semifinals ====
Sunday, March 30, 9:00 am

Sheet D	1	2	3	4	5	6	7	8	9	10	Final
Quebec 1 (Fortin)	2	0	1	0	0	1	0	1	1	0	6
British Columbia (Hafeli)	0	2	0	1	0	0	1	0	0	1	5

Sheet E	1	2	3	4	5	6	7	8	9	10	Final
Alberta 1 (Plett)	1	0	0	2	0	3	0	4	X	X	10
Nova Scotia 1 (Regan)	0	0	1	0	0	0	2	0	X	X	3

==== Bronze medal game ====
Sunday, March 30, 3:00 pm

Sheet D	1	2	3	4	5	6	7	8	9	10	11	Final
British Columbia (Hafeli)	0	0	0	0	1	0	0	3	1	0	1	6
Nova Scotia 1 (Regan)	0	1	1	1	0	0	1	0	0	1	0	5

==== Final ====
Sunday, March 30, 3:00 pm

Sheet C	1	2	3	4	5	6	7	8	9	10	Final
Quebec 1 (Fortin)	0	0	0	0	1	0	0	2	X	X	3
Alberta 1 (Plett)	1	2	1	1	0	3	1	0	X	X	9

=== Final standings ===
Place	Team
1st place, gold medalist(s)	Alberta 1
2nd place, silver medalist(s)	Quebec 1
3rd place, bronze medalist(s)	British Columbia
4	Nova Scotia 1
5	New Brunswick
6	Manitoba 2
7	Ontario 1
8	Alberta 2
9	Nova Scotia 2
10	Ontario 2
11	Quebec 2
12	Manitoba 1
13	Newfoundland and Labrador
14	Northern Ontario
15	Saskatchewan
16	Northwest Territories
17	Prince Edward Island 1
18	Prince Edward Island 2

== Qualification ==
=== Ontario ===
The Ontario U20 Curling Championships were held from January 29–February 2 2025, at the Royal Kingston Curling Club in Kingston, Ontario.

The championship was held in a round robin format, which qualified three teams for a playoff. Two men's and two women's teams qualified for the national championship.

Pre-Playoff Results:

Men	W	L
Owen Nicholls (KW Granite)	6	1
Noah Garner (Dixie)	5	2
William Jewell (Acton)	4	3
Nicholas Rowe (Ottawa Hunt)	4	3
Tyler Smith (Dundas Valley)	3	4
Jackson Marchant (Richmond Hill)	2	5
Ryne Fisher (Uxbridge)	2	5
Evan MacDougall (Guelph)	2	5

Women	W	L
Dominique Vivier (Navan)	7	0
Charlotte Wilson (Rideau)	6	1
Katrina Frlan (Huntley)	5	2
Ava Acres (RCMP)	4	3
Katelin Langford (Lindsay)	3	4
Hailey Brittain (Dixie)	2	5
Emma Pentson (Barrie)	1	6
Lillianne Wrigley (Oshawa)	0	7

Playoff Results:

- Men's Tiebreaker: Rowe 7, Jewell 4
- Men's Semifinal: Garner 8, Rowe 6
- Men's Final: Nicholls 7, Garner 1
- Women's Semifinal: Frlan 10, Wilson 6
- Women's Final: Vivier 5, Frlan 3
