= 2019 Northwest Territories Scotties Tournament of Hearts =

- Host city: Yellowknife, Northwest Territories
- Arena: Yellowknife Curling Centre
- Dates: January 10–11
- Winner: Team Galusha
- Curling club: Yellowknife Curling Centre
- Skip: Kerry Galusha
- Third: Sarah Koltun
- Second: Brittany Tran
- Lead: Shona Barbour
- Finalist: Tyanna Bain

The 2019 Northwest Territories Scotties Tournament of Hearts, the territorial women's curling championship for Northwest Territories, was held January 10–11 at the Yellowknife Curling Centre in Yellowknife, Northwest Territories.

Only two teams entered the event, the defending champion Kerry Galusha rink from Yellowknife and the 2019 territorial junior champion Tyanna Bain rink from Inuvik. As such, the event was a best-of-five series. Galusha easily beat the Bain rink in three games. Team Galusha represented Northwest Territories at the 2019 Scotties Tournament of Hearts, Canada's national women's curling championship.

== Teams ==
The teams are listed as follows:

Skip	Third	Second	Lead	Club(s)
Tyanna Bain	Pearl Gills	Mataya Gills	Adrianna Hendrick	Inuvik Curling Club
Kerry Galusha	Sarah Koltun	Brittany Tran	Shona Barbour	Yellowknife Curling Centre

== Scores ==
=== Game #1 ===
January 10, 8:00pm

Team	1	2	3	4	5	6	7	8	9	10	Final
Kerry Galusha	2	2	2	1	0	0	3	2	X	X	12
Tyanna Bain	0	0	0	0	1	1	0	0	X	X	2

=== Game #2 ===
January 11, 10:00am

Team	1	2	3	4	5	6	7	8	9	10	Final
Kerry Galusha	3	2	1	0	3	0	1	0	X	X	10
Tyanna Bain	0	0	0	2	0	1	0	1	X	X	4

=== Game #3 ===
January 11, 2:30pm

Team	1	2	3	4	5	6	7	8	9	10	Final
Kerry Galusha	3	0	4	2	1	0	X	X	X	X	10
Tyanna Bain	0	1	0	0	0	1	X	X	X	X	2
