= 2020 Northwest Territories Scotties Tournament of Hearts =

- Host city: Hay River, Northwest Territories
- Arena: Hay River Curling Club
- Dates: January 9–12
- Winner: Team Galusha
- Curling club: Yellowknife Curling Club, Yellowknife
- Skip: Kerry Galusha
- Third: Sarah Koltun
- Second: Jo-Ann Rizzo
- Lead: Shona Barbour
- Finalist: Sarah Stroeder

The 2020 Northwest Territories Women's Curling Championship, the women's provincial curling championship for the Northwest Territories, was held from January 9 to 12 at the Hay River Curling Club in Hay River, Northwest Territories. The winning Kerry Galusha rink represented the Northwest Territories at the 2020 Scotties Tournament of Hearts in Moose Jaw, Saskatchewan and finished with a 2–5 record.

Kerry Galusha and her team went undefeated through the tournament to claim the title with a perfect 4–0 round robin record and a 9–3 win over club mates Sarah Stroeder in the final.

== Teams ==
The teams are listed as follows:

Skip	Third	Second	Lead	Club
Betti Delorey	Halli-Rai Delorey	Nancy Stanley	Ashley Squires-Rowe	Hay River Curling Club, Hay River
Jo-Ann Rizzo	Sarah Koltun	Kerry Galusha (skip)	Shona Barbour	Yellowknife Curling Club, Yellowknife
Judy Goucher	Carmella Oscienny	Kandis Jameson	Melanie Carter	Hay River Curling Club, Hay River
Michelle Hartwell (fourth)	Monique Gagnier	Katrina Delorey	Tana Martin (skip)	Hay River Curling Club, Hay River
Sarah Stroeder	Sharon Cormier	Megan Koehler	Anneli Jokela	Yellowknife Curling Club, Yellowknife

== Round-robin standings ==
Final round-robin standings

Key
Teams to Playoffs

Skip	W	L
Kerry Galusha	4	0
Sarah Stroeder	3	1
Betti Delorey	2	2
Tana Martin	1	3
Judy Goucher	0	4

== Round-robin results ==
All draws are listed in Mountain Standard Time (UTC−07:00).

=== Draw 1 ===
Thursday, January 9, 3:30 pm

Sheet 1	1	2	3	4	5	6	7	8	9	10	Final
Kerry Galusha	1	0	0	3	5	1	X	X	X	X	10
Sarah Stroeder	0	1	1	0	0	0	X	X	X	X	2

Sheet 2	1	2	3	4	5	6	7	8	9	10	Final
Tana Martin	4	0	1	1	0	2	2	0	X	X	10
Judy Goucher	0	1	0	0	1	0	0	0	X	X	2

=== Draw 2 ===
Thursday, January 9, 8:00 pm

Sheet 2	1	2	3	4	5	6	7	8	9	10	Final
Betti Delorey	0	0	0	1	0	1	0	0	X	X	2
Kerry Galusha	4	1	1	0	5	0	2	0	X	X	13

Sheet 3	1	2	3	4	5	6	7	8	9	10	Final
Sarah Stroeder	1	0	0	0	1	0	1	0	1	1	5
Tana Martin	0	0	1	0	0	2	0	1	0	0	4

=== Draw 3 ===
Friday, January 10, 10:00 am

Sheet 1	1	2	3	4	5	6	7	8	9	10	Final
Judy Goucher	2	0	1	0	3	0	0	0	4	0	10
Betti Delorey	0	2	0	1	0	1	2	2	0	3	11

Sheet 3	1	2	3	4	5	6	7	8	9	10	Final
Tana Martin	2	0	0	1	1	0	0	0	X	X	4
Kerry Galusha	0	2	2	0	0	2	2	1	X	X	9

=== Draw 4 ===
Friday, January 10, 3:00 pm

Sheet 1	1	2	3	4	5	6	7	8	9	10	Final
Betti Delorey	1	0	0	2	1	0	0	1	1	1	7
Tana Martin	0	2	1	0	0	2	1	0	0	0	6

Sheet 3	1	2	3	4	5	6	7	8	9	10	Final
Judy Goucher	0	0	0	0	1	0	0	1	X	X	2
Sarah Stroeder	1	1	2	2	0	2	2	0	X	X	10

=== Draw 5 ===
Saturday, January 11, 9:00 am

Sheet 2	1	2	3	4	5	6	7	8	9	10	Final
Sarah Stroeder	0	3	1	0	4	0	X	X	X	X	8
Betti Delorey	0	0	0	2	0	1	X	X	X	X	3

Sheet 3	1	2	3	4	5	6	7	8	9	10	Final
Kerry Galusha	4	3	1	2	0	2	X	X	X	X	12
Judy Goucher	0	0	0	0	1	0	X	X	X	X	1

== Playoffs ==
Semifinal			Final
			1	Kerry Galusha	9
2	Sarah Stroeder	13	2	Sarah Stroeder	3
3	Betti Delorey	3

=== Semifinal ===
Saturday, January 11, 7:30 pm

Team	1	2	3	4	5	6	7	8	9	10	Final
Sarah Stroeder	3	0	3	2	0	2	1	2	X	X	13
Betti Delorey	0	2	0	0	1	0	0	0	X	X	3

=== Final ===
Sunday, January 12, 2:00 pm

Team	1	2	3	4	5	6	7	8	9	10	Final
Kerry Galusha	1	0	2	1	0	0	4	1	X	X	9
Sarah Stroeder	0	1	0	0	1	1	0	0	X	X	3

2020 Northwest Territories Scotties Tournament of Hearts
(Northwest Territories)
Kerry Galusha
17th Territorial Championship title
