= 2018 Northwest Territories Scotties Tournament of Hearts =

- Host city: Inuvik, Northwest Territories
- Arena: Inuvik Curling Club
- Dates: January 4–7
- Winner: Team Galusha
- Curling club: Yellowknife CC, Yellowknife
- Skip: Kerry Galusha
- Third: Sarah Koltun
- Second: Megan Koehler
- Lead: Shona Barbour
- Coach: Fred Koe
- Finalist: Melba Mitchell

The 2018 Northwest Territories Scotties Tournament of Hearts, the provincial women's curling championship for Northwest Territories, was held January 4–7 at the Inuvik Curling Club in Inuvik, Northwest Territories. The winning Kerry Galusha team represented Northwest Territories at the 2018 Scotties Tournament of Hearts.

== Teams ==
The teams are listed as follows:

Skip	Third	Second	Lead	Club(s)
Tyanna Bain	Mataya Gills	Pearl Gills	Kathleen Dunbar	Inuvik Curling Club
Kerry Galusha	Sarah Koltun	Megan Koehler	Shona Barbour	Yellowknife Curling Centre
Ashley Lennie	Stephanie Crocker	Leah Bishop	Tannis Bain	Inuvik Curling Club
Melba Mitchell	Bella Charlie	Leah Lennie	Tanya Gruben	Inuvik Curling Club

== Round-robin standings ==
	W	L
Kerry Galusha	6	0
Melba Mitchell	3	3
Tyanna Bain	2	4
Ashley Lennie	1	5

== Scores ==
=== January 4 ===
Draw 1

- Galusha 6-2 Bain
- Mitchell 10-1 Lennie

=== January 5 ===
Draw 2

- Galusha 12-0 Lennie
- Mitchell 10-2 Bain

=== January 6 ===
Draw 3

- Bain 12-8 Lennie
- Mitchell 2-13 Galusha

Draw 4

- Galusha 11-1 Mitchell
- Lennie 12-8 Bain

=== January 7 ===
Draw 5

- Bain 13-10 Mitchell
- Lennie 2-8 Galusha

Draw 6

- Galusha 9-2 Bain
- Mitchell 12-11 Lennie
