= 2023 Northwest Territories Scotties Tournament of Hearts =

- Host city: Inuvik, Northwest Territories
- Arena: Inuvik Curling Club
- Dates: January 11–15
- Winner: Team Galusha
- Curling club: Yellowknife CC, Yellowknife
- Skip: Kerry Galusha
- Fourth: Jo-Ann Rizzo
- Third: Margot Flemming
- Second: Sarah Koltun
- Alternate: Megan Koehler
- Coach: Shona Barbour
- Finalist: Reese Wainman

The 2023 Northwest Territories Scotties Tournament of Hearts, the women's territorial curling championship for the Northwest Territories, was held from January 11 to 15 at the Inuvik Curling Centre in Inuvik, Northwest Territories. The winning Kerry Galusha rink represented the Northwest Territories at the 2023 Scotties Tournament of Hearts in Kamloops, British Columbia, and finished fourth in Pool B with a 4–4 record.

== Teams ==
The teams are as follows:

Skip	Third	Second	Lead	Club
Tyanna Bain	Carina McKay-Saturnino	Tyra Bain	Tannis Bain	Inuvik CC, Inuvik
Jo-Ann Rizzo (Fourth)	Margot Flemming	Sarah Koltun	Kerry Galusha (Skip)	Yellowknife CC, Yellowknife
Ashley Lennie	Natasha Nasogaluak	Alison Lennie	Kate Jarvis	Inuvik CC, Inuvik
Reese Wainman	Alex Testart-Campbell	Brooke Smith	Tamara Bain	Inuvik CC, Inuvik

== Round-robin standings ==
Final round-robin standings

Key
Teams to Playoffs

Skip	W	L	PF	PA	EW	EL	BE	SE
Kerry Galusha	6	0	69	14	29	11	0	15
Reese Wainman	3	3	37	48	18	25	1	4
Tyanna Bain	2	4	33	45	22	24	2	8
Ashley Lennie	1	5	31	63	18	27	0	6

== Round-robin results ==
All draw times are listed in Mountain Time (UTC-07:00).

=== Draw 1 ===
Wednesday, January 11, 7:30 pm

Sheet A	1	2	3	4	5	6	7	8	9	10	Final
Ashley Lennie	2	3	1	1	0	3	0	0	X	X	10
Tyanna Bain	0	0	0	0	2	0	1	2	X	X	5

Sheet B	1	2	3	4	5	6	7	8	9	10	Final
Reese Wainman	0	0	0	1	0	1	X	X	X	X	2
Kerry Galusha	4	2	3	0	4	0	X	X	X	X	13

=== Draw 2 ===
Thursday, January 12, 2:00 pm

Sheet A	1	2	3	4	5	6	7	8	9	10	Final
Kerry Galusha	1	5	2	3	0	4	X	X	X	X	15
Ashley Lennie	0	0	0	0	1	0	X	X	X	X	1

Sheet B	1	2	3	4	5	6	7	8	9	10	Final
Tyanna Bain	1	0	0	1	0	2	0	0	1	X	5
Reese Wainman	0	0	2	0	3	0	2	1	0	X	8

=== Draw 3 ===
Thursday, January 12, 8:00 pm

Sheet A	1	2	3	4	5	6	7	8	9	10	Final
Tyanna Bain	0	0	0	0	1	0	X	X	X	X	1
Kerry Galusha	2	1	1	4	0	3	X	X	X	X	11

Sheet B	1	2	3	4	5	6	7	8	9	10	Final
Reese Wainman	3	0	4	4	0	1	X	X	X	X	12
Ashley Lennie	0	2	0	0	1	0	X	X	X	X	3

=== Draw 4 ===
Friday, January 13, 2:00 pm

Sheet A	1	2	3	4	5	6	7	8	9	10	Final
Ashley Lennie	2	0	2	1	0	2	0	0	1	X	8
Reese Wainman	0	5	0	0	1	0	2	2	0	X	10

Sheet B	1	2	3	4	5	6	7	8	9	10	Final
Kerry Galusha	2	0	2	0	1	0	1	0	2	X	8
Tyanna Bain	0	1	0	0	0	2	0	1	0	X	4

=== Draw 5 ===
Friday, January 13, 8:00 pm

Sheet A	1	2	3	4	5	6	7	8	9	10	Final
Reese Wainman	1	2	0	1	0	0	0	0	X	X	4
Tyanna Bain	0	0	1	0	3	1	3	1	X	X	9

Sheet B	1	2	3	4	5	6	7	8	9	10	Final
Ashley Lennie	0	1	1	0	3	0	0	0	X	X	5
Kerry Galusha	2	0	0	2	0	3	4	1	X	X	12

=== Draw 6 ===
Saturday, January 14, 2:00 pm

Sheet A	1	2	3	4	5	6	7	8	9	10	Final
Kerry Galusha	2	1	3	3	1	0	X	X	X	X	10
Reese Wainman	0	0	0	0	0	1	X	X	X	X	1

Sheet B	1	2	3	4	5	6	7	8	9	10	Final
Tyanna Bain	0	4	0	0	1	1	1	1	1	X	9
Ashley Lennie	2	0	2	0	0	0	0	0	0	X	4

== Playoffs ==
1 vs. 2
1	Kerry Galusha	10
2	Reese Wainman	2

Semifinal
2	Reese Wainman	6
3	Tyanna Bain	3

Final
1	Kerry Galusha	8
2	Reese Wainman	1

=== 1 vs. 2 ===
Sunday, January 15, 10:00 am

Sheet B	1	2	3	4	5	6	7	8	9	10	Final
Kerry Galusha	3	3	0	2	2	0	X	X	X	X	10
Reese Wainman	0	0	1	0	0	1	X	X	X	X	2

=== Semifinal ===
Sunday, January 15, 3:00 pm

Sheet B	1	2	3	4	5	6	7	8	9	10	Final
Reese Wainman	0	4	0	2	0	X	X	X	X	X	6
Tyanna Bain	1	0	1	0	1	X	X	X	X	X	3

=== Final ===
Sunday, January 15, 8:00 pm

Sheet B	1	2	3	4	5	6	7	8	9	10	Final
Kerry Galusha	1	3	2	0	0	2	X	X	X	X	8
Reese Wainman	0	0	0	0	1	0	X	X	X	X	1

2023 Northwest Territories Scotties Tournament of Hearts
(Northwest Territories)
Kerry Galusha
19th Territorial Championship title
