= 2016 Northwest Territories Scotties Tournament of Hearts =

- Host city: Hay River, Northwest Territories
- Arena: Hay River Curling Club
- Dates: January 27–31
- Winner: Kerry Galusha
- Curling club: Yellowknife Curling Centre
- Skip: Kerry Galusha
- Third: Megan Cormier
- Second: Danielle Derry
- Lead: Shona Barbour
- Alternate: Sharon Cormier
- Finalist: Judy Goucher

The 2016 Northwest Territories Scotties Tournament of Hearts was held from January 27 to 31 at the Hay River Curling Club in Hay River. The winning Kerry Galusha team represented the Northwest Territories at the 2016 Scotties Tournament of Hearts in Grande Prairie, Alberta.

== Teams ==
The teams are listed as follows:

Skip	Third	Second	Lead	Alternate	Club
Lora Browne	Brittany Brasser	Patty Hartlen	Courtney Kaeser		Fort Smith Curling Club, Fort Smith
Kerry Galusha	Megan Cormier	Danielle Derry	Shona Barbour	Sharon Cormier	Yellowknife Curling Club, Yellowknife
Judy Goucher	Candis Carleton	Kandis Jameson	Kelsey Gill		Hay River Curling Club, Hay River
Deb Stanley	Betti Delorey	Katrina Delorey	Rayna Hunt		Hay River Curling Club, Hay River

== Round-robin standings ==
Key
Teams to final

Skip	W	L
Galusha	5	1
Goucher	3	3
Browne	2	4
Stanley	2	4

== Round-robin results ==
=== January 27 ===
Draw 1

- Galusha 11-1 Stanley
- Goucher 9-7 Browne

=== January 28 ===
Draw 2

- Galusha 12-3 Goucher
- Browne 9-7 Stanley

Draw 3

- Galusha 15-1 Browne
- Stanley 10-2 Goucher

=== January 29 ===
Draw 4

- Goucher 10-2 Stanley
- Browne 9-5 Galusha

Draw 5

- Stanley 8-5 Browne
- Galusha 14-1 Goucher

=== January 30 ===
Draw 6

- Goucher 10-9 Browne
- Galusha 10-2 Stanley

== Final ==
Sunday, January 31, 11:00 am

Team	1	2	3	4	5	6	7	8	9	10	Final
Kerry Galusha	0	3	0	2	0	2	1	2	0	0	10
Judy Goucher	1	0	1	0	3	0	0	0	0	1	6
