= 2024 Northwest Territories Scotties Tournament of Hearts =

- Host city: Hay River, Northwest Territories
- Arena: Hay River Curling Club
- Dates: January 17–21
- Winner: Team Galusha
- Curling club: Yellowknife CC, Yellowknife
- Skip: Kerry Galusha
- Fourth: Jo-Ann Rizzo
- Third: Margot Flemming
- Second: Sarah Koltun
- Coach: Shona Barbour
- Finalist: Team Wainman

The 2024 Northwest Territories Scotties Tournament of Hearts, the women's territorial curling championship for the Northwest Territories, was held from January 17 to 21 at the Hay River Curling Club in Hay River, Northwest Territories. The winning Kerry Galusha rink will represent the Northwest Territories at the 2024 Scotties Tournament of Hearts in Calgary, Alberta.

== Teams ==
The teams are as follows:

| Skip | Third | Second | Lead | Alternate | Club |
|---|---|---|---|---|---|
| Betti Delorey | Halli-Rai Delorey | Amanda Roach | Trudie Walsh | | Hay River CC, Hay River |
| Jo-Ann Rizzo (Fourth) | Margot Flemming | Sarah Koltun | Kerry Galusha (Skip) | | Yellowknife CC, Yellowknife |
| Deb Stanley | Carmela Ocienny | Kandis Jameson | Mariyn Taylor | | Hay River CC, Hay River |
| Reese Wainman (Fourth) | Alex Testart-Campbell | Brooke Smith | Sharon Cormier (Skip) | Tamara Bain | Inuvik CC, Inuvik |

== Round robin standings ==
Final Round Robin Standings

Key
| Teams to Playoffs |

| Skip | W | L | PF | PA | EW | EL | BE | SE |
|---|---|---|---|---|---|---|---|---|
| Kerry Galusha | 6 | 0 | 70 | 14 | 25 | 13 | 0 | 10 |
| Team Wainman | 3 | 3 | 48 | 41 | 24 | 20 | 0 | 12 |
| Betti Delorey | 3 | 3 | 36 | 46 | 22 | 22 | 0 | 8 |
| Deb Stanley | 0 | 6 | 15 | 68 | 11 | 27 | 0 | 1 |

== Round-robin results ==
All draw times are listed in Mountain Time (UTC-07:00).

=== Draw 1 ===
Wednesday, January 17, 8:00 pm

| Sheet B | 1 | 2 | 3 | 4 | 5 | 6 | 7 | 8 | 9 | 10 | Final |
|---|---|---|---|---|---|---|---|---|---|---|---|
| Deb Stanley | 0 | 1 | 0 | 1 | 0 | 0 | X | X | X | X | 2 |
| Kerry Galusha | 4 | 0 | 1 | 0 | 2 | 2 | X | X | X | X | 9 |

| Sheet C | 1 | 2 | 3 | 4 | 5 | 6 | 7 | 8 | 9 | 10 | Final |
|---|---|---|---|---|---|---|---|---|---|---|---|
| Team Wainman | 0 | 0 | 2 | 0 | 2 | 1 | 0 | 0 | 0 | X | 5 |
| Betti Delorey | 1 | 1 | 0 | 1 | 0 | 0 | 2 | 1 | 2 | X | 8 |

=== Draw 2 ===
Thursday, January 18, 2:00 pm

| Sheet B | 1 | 2 | 3 | 4 | 5 | 6 | 7 | 8 | 9 | 10 | Final |
|---|---|---|---|---|---|---|---|---|---|---|---|
| Betti Delorey | 3 | 0 | 1 | 1 | 0 | 3 | X | X | X | X | 8 |
| Deb Stanley | 0 | 2 | 0 | 0 | 1 | 0 | X | X | X | X | 3 |

| Sheet C | 1 | 2 | 3 | 4 | 5 | 6 | 7 | 8 | 9 | 10 | Final |
|---|---|---|---|---|---|---|---|---|---|---|---|
| Kerry Galusha | 5 | 0 | 2 | 0 | 2 | 3 | X | X | X | X | 12 |
| Team Wainman | 0 | 1 | 0 | 1 | 0 | 0 | X | X | X | X | 2 |

=== Draw 3 ===
Thursday, January 18, 7:30 pm

| Sheet B | 1 | 2 | 3 | 4 | 5 | 6 | 7 | 8 | 9 | 10 | Final |
|---|---|---|---|---|---|---|---|---|---|---|---|
| Kerry Galusha | 2 | 0 | 3 | 0 | 0 | 5 | X | X | X | X | 10 |
| Betti Delorey | 0 | 1 | 0 | 1 | 1 | 0 | X | X | X | X | 3 |

| Sheet C | 1 | 2 | 3 | 4 | 5 | 6 | 7 | 8 | 9 | 10 | Final |
|---|---|---|---|---|---|---|---|---|---|---|---|
| Team Wainman | 3 | 1 | 2 | 2 | 3 | 0 | X | X | X | X | 11 |
| Deb Stanley | 0 | 0 | 0 | 0 | 0 | 2 | X | X | X | X | 2 |

=== Draw 4 ===
Friday, January 19, 9:30 am

| Sheet B | 1 | 2 | 3 | 4 | 5 | 6 | 7 | 8 | 9 | 10 | Final |
|---|---|---|---|---|---|---|---|---|---|---|---|
| Deb Stanley | 0 | 2 | 0 | 0 | 0 | 0 | X | X | X | X | 2 |
| Team Wainman | 5 | 0 | 3 | 3 | 3 | 2 | X | X | X | X | 16 |

| Sheet C | 1 | 2 | 3 | 4 | 5 | 6 | 7 | 8 | 9 | 10 | Final |
|---|---|---|---|---|---|---|---|---|---|---|---|
| Betti Delorey | 0 | 0 | 0 | 0 | 1 | 0 | X | X | X | X | 1 |
| Kerry Galusha | 3 | 4 | 2 | 3 | 0 | 2 | X | X | X | X | 14 |

=== Draw 5 ===
Friday, January 19, 3:00 pm

| Sheet B | 1 | 2 | 3 | 4 | 5 | 6 | 7 | 8 | 9 | 10 | Final |
|---|---|---|---|---|---|---|---|---|---|---|---|
| Team Wainman | 0 | 0 | 1 | 1 | 0 | 2 | 1 | 0 | X | X | 5 |
| Kerry Galusha | 3 | 1 | 0 | 0 | 3 | 0 | 0 | 4 | X | X | 11 |

| Sheet C | 1 | 2 | 3 | 4 | 5 | 6 | 7 | 8 | 9 | 10 | Final |
|---|---|---|---|---|---|---|---|---|---|---|---|
| Deb Stanley | 0 | 1 | 0 | 1 | 2 | 0 | 0 | 1 | X | X | 5 |
| Betti Delorey | 3 | 0 | 2 | 0 | 0 | 2 | 3 | 0 | X | X | 10 |

=== Draw 6 ===
Saturday, January 20, 10:00 am

| Sheet B | 1 | 2 | 3 | 4 | 5 | 6 | 7 | 8 | 9 | 10 | Final |
|---|---|---|---|---|---|---|---|---|---|---|---|
| Betti Delorey | 1 | 1 | 0 | 2 | 0 | 0 | 0 | 2 | 0 | X | 6 |
| Team Wainman | 0 | 0 | 1 | 0 | 1 | 1 | 2 | 0 | 4 | X | 9 |

| Sheet C | 1 | 2 | 3 | 4 | 5 | 6 | 7 | 8 | 9 | 10 | Final |
|---|---|---|---|---|---|---|---|---|---|---|---|
| Kerry Galusha | 2 | 3 | 3 | 2 | 4 | 0 | X | X | X | X | 14 |
| Deb Stanley | 0 | 0 | 0 | 0 | 0 | 1 | X | X | X | X | 1 |

== Playoffs ==
| Semifinal | | | Final |
| | | | 1 | Kerry Galusha | 8 |
| 2 | Team Wainman | 11 | 2 | Team Wainman | 3 |
| 3 | Betti Delorey | 3 |

=== Semifinal ===
Saturday, January 20, 3:30 pm

| Sheet B | 1 | 2 | 3 | 4 | 5 | 6 | 7 | 8 | 9 | 10 | Final |
|---|---|---|---|---|---|---|---|---|---|---|---|
| Team Wainman | 2 | 2 | 3 | 0 | 1 | 0 | 0 | 3 | X | X | 11 |
| Betti Delorey | 0 | 0 | 0 | 1 | 0 | 1 | 1 | 0 | X | X | 3 |

=== Final ===
Sunday, January 21, 10:00 am

| Sheet B | 1 | 2 | 3 | 4 | 5 | 6 | 7 | 8 | 9 | 10 | Final |
|---|---|---|---|---|---|---|---|---|---|---|---|
| Kerry Galusha | 2 | 1 | 2 | 0 | 2 | 1 | 0 | 0 | X | X | 8 |
| Team Wainman | 0 | 0 | 0 | 1 | 0 | 0 | 1 | 1 | X | X | 3 |

2024 Northwest Territories Scotties Tournament of Hearts
(Northwest Territories)
Kerry Galusha
20th Territorial Championship title
