= 2014 NWT/Yukon Scotties Tournament of Hearts =

- Host city: Yellowknife, Northwest Territories
- Arena: Yellowknife Curling Club
- Dates: January 3–5
- Winner: (Yukon) Sarah Koltun
- Curling club: Whitehorse Curling Club
- Skip: Sarah Koltun
- Third: Chelsea Duncan
- Second: Patty Wallingham
- Lead: Andrea Sinclair
- Finalist: (Northwest Territories) Kerry Galusha

The 2014 NWT/Yukon Scotties Tournament of Hearts, Canada's territorial women's curling championship, was held from January 3 to 5 at the Yellowknife Curling Club in Yellowknife, Northwest Territories. The winning Sarah Koltun team represented the territories at the 2014 Scotties Tournament of Hearts in Montreal.

The event marked the first time since 2011 that teams from the Yukon participated. Both the 2012 and 2013 events were cancelled, due to the only entries coming from the Northwest Territories, making that territory's championship the qualifier for the Scotties.

The Sarah Koltun rink from Whitehorse won the event, becoming the first team from the Yukon to win the tournament since 2000. It also marks only the second time in the last 10 years that Kerry Galusha did not win the event.

== Qualification ==
Two teams entered the Yukon championship, thus both qualifying. A best-of-three series was held to determine the territorial champion. Nicole Baldwin won the series, defeating Sarah Koltun (both of Whitehorse) two games to one. Three teams entered the Northwest Territories championship, which was a double round robin. Yellowknife's Kerry Galusha (3–1) and Inuvik's Melba Mitchell (2-2) qualified, while Yellowknife's Ann McKellar-Gillis (1–3) failed to do so.

== Teams ==
Skip	Third	Second	Lead	Club(s)
Nicole Baldwin	Ladene Shaw	Helen Strong	Rhonda Horte	(Yukon) Whitehorse Curling Club, Whitehorse
Sarah Koltun	Chelsea Duncan	Patty Wallingham	Andrea Sinclair	(Yukon) Whitehorse Curling Club, Whitehorse
Kerry Galusha	Ashley Green	Megan Cormier	Wendy Miller	(Northwest Territories) Yellowknife Curling Club, Yellowknife
Melba Mitchell	Donna Maring	Cheryl Greenland	Ashley Lennie	(Northwest Territories) Inuvik Curling Club, Inuvik

== Round-robin standings ==
Skip (Club)	W	L	PF	PA
Kerry Galusha (Yellowknife)	5	1	54	32
Sarah Koltun (Whitehorse)	5	1	47	25
Nicole Baldwin (Whitehorse)	2	4	48	40
Melba Mitchell (Inuvik)	0	6	16	68

== Round-robin results ==
=== Draw 1 ===
Friday, January 3, 2:30 pm

Sheet 3	1	2	3	4	5	6	7	8	9	10	Final
Kerry Galusha 🔨	0	3	0	3	0	4	0	1	X	X	11
Melba Mitchell	1	0	1	0	2	0	1	0	X	X	5

Sheet 4	1	2	3	4	5	6	7	8	9	10	11	Final
Nicole Baldwin	0	1	0	1	0	1	0	1	0	2	0	6
Sarah Koltun	1	0	2	0	1	0	1	0	1	0	1	7

=== Draw 2 ===
Friday, January 3, 7:30 pm

Sheet 5	1	2	3	4	5	6	7	8	9	10	Final
Melba Mitchell	1	0	1	0	0	0	X	X	X	X	2
Nicole Baldwin 🔨	0	5	0	1	3	3	X	X	X	X	12

Sheet 6	1	2	3	4	5	6	7	8	9	10	Final
Sarah Koltun	1	0	1	0	0	1	0	0	1	X	4
Kerry Galusha 🔨	0	1	0	3	1	0	1	1	0	X	7

=== Draw 3 ===
Saturday, January 4, 9:30 am

Sheet 3	1	2	3	4	5	6	7	8	9	10	Final
Sarah Koltun 🔨	0	0	1	0	1	0	1	2	0	1	6
Nicole Baldwin	2	0	0	1	0	1	0	0	1	0	5

Sheet 4	1	2	3	4	5	6	7	8	9	10	Final
Melba Mitchell	0	0	1	0	0	1	X	X	X	X	2
Kerry Galusha 🔨	3	2	0	5	1	0	X	X	X	X	11

=== Draw 4 ===
Saturday, January 4, 2:30 pm

Sheet 5	1	2	3	4	5	6	7	8	9	10	Final
Nicole Baldwin	0	2	0	1	0	1	0	2	0	X	6
Kerry Galusha 🔨	2	0	2	0	2	0	1	0	3	X	10

Sheet 6	1	2	3	4	5	6	7	8	9	10	Final
Melba Mitchell 🔨	0	0	1	0	0	0	X	X	X	X	1
Sarah Koltun	1	2	0	3	2	3	X	X	X	X	11

=== Draw 5 ===
Sunday, January 5, 10:00 am

Sheet 3	1	2	3	4	5	6	7	8	9	10	Final
Kerry Galusha	0	2	0	1	0	0	1	1	0	0	5
Sarah Koltun 🔨	1	0	1	0	1	1	0	0	2	1	7

Sheet 6	1	2	3	4	5	6	7	8	9	10	Final
Nicole Baldwin	0	1	1	4	0	3	0	0	2	X	11
Melba Mitchell 🔨	2	0	0	0	2	0	0	1	0	X	5

=== Draw 6 ===
Sunday, January 5, 3:00 pm

Sheet 4	1	2	3	4	5	6	7	8	9	10	Final
Kerry Galusha	0	2	0	2	0	2	0	4	0	X	10
Nicole Baldwin 🔨	3	0	1	0	1	0	1	0	2	X	8

Sheet 5	1	2	3	4	5	6	7	8	9	10	Final
Sarah Koltun 🔨	1	2	0	5	3	1	X	X	X	X	12
Melba Mitchell	0	0	1	0	0	0	X	X	X	X	1

== Tiebreaker ==
Monday, January 6, 9:30 am

Sheet 5	1	2	3	4	5	6	7	8	9	10	Final
Kerry Galusha	1	0	1	0	0	1	0	1	0	X	4
Sarah Koltun 🔨	0	1	0	1	1	0	1	0	2	X	6

2014 NWT/Yukon Scotties Tournament of Hearts

Sarah Koltun
1st NWT/Yukon Scotties Championship title
