= Sydney Galusha =

Canadian curler (born 2009)

- Curler
- Born: July 20, 2009 (age 17); Yellowknife, Northwest Territories

Team
- Curling club: Yellowknife Curling Club, Yellowknife, NT

Curling career
- Member Association: Northwest Territories
- Hearts: 2 (2025, 2026)

Sydney Galusha (born July 20, 2009) is a Canadian curler from Yellowknife, Northwest Territories. She currently skips her own junior team out of the Northwest Territories. She is known as the youngest curler to compete in the Scotties Tournament of Hearts at 15 years of age.

== Career ==
=== Juniors ===
In 2024, Galusha competed in the 2024 Canadian Junior Curling Championships, as the skip for the Northwest Territories team. Her rink would go on to finish the round robin with a 2-6 record, and finished 14th overall in the tournament. Galusha and her rink would return for the also skipped the 2025 Canadian Junior Curling Championships, where her rink finished the round robin with a 1-7 record, finishing 16th overall.

=== Women ===
In 2025, she would join her mother, Kerry Galusha's rink at second to make a run at the 2025 Scotties Tournament of Hearts. In the 2025 Northwest Territories Women's Curling Championship, her team would go on to defeat the Betti Delorey rink three games to one and qualify themselves for the 2025 Scotties Tournament of Hearts. With this qualification, Galusha becomes the youngest curler on record to compete in the Scotties Tournaments of Hearts At the 2025 Scotties, the team finished the round robin with a 3–5 record, and her mother, Kerry, announced her retirement from competitive curling.

== Personal life ==
Galusha is the daughter of 21-time Northwest Territories Women's Curling Champion Kerry Galusha, and the niece of Canadian and World men's curling champion Kevin Koe, who skips a team out of Alberta, as well as Jamie Koe, who skips a team out of the Northwest Territories.

Galusha also plays basketball, and was on the Northwest Territories women's team at the 2025 Canada Summer Games.

As of 2026, she was a student at Sir John Franklin High School.

== Teams ==
Season	Skip	Third	Second	Lead	Alternate
2023–24	Kali Skauge	Sydney Galusha	Ella Skauge	Brynn Chorostkowski	
2024–25	Kerry Galusha	Megan Koehler	Sydney Galusha	Shona Barbour	Ella Skauge
2024–25	Sydney Galusha	Ella Skauge	Mackenzie Chiasson	Brynn Chorostowski	
2025–26	Nicky Kaufman	Megan Koehler	Sydney Galusha	Ella Skauge	Brynn Chorostkowski
2025–26	Sydney Galusha	Ella Skauge	Morgan Stabel	Brynn Chorostkowski	
