= 2021 Northwest Territories Scotties Tournament of Hearts =

- Host city: Yellowknife, Northwest Territories
- Arena: Yellowknife Curling Centre
- Dates: January 30–31
- Winner: Team Galusha
- Curling club: Yellowknife CC, Yellowknife
- Skip: Kerry Galusha
- Third: Jo-Ann Rizzo
- Second: Margot Flemming
- Lead: Shona Barbour
- Finalist: Cassie Rogers

The 2021 Northwest Territories Scotties Tournament of Hearts, the women's territorial curling championship for the Northwest Territories, was held from January 30 to 31 at the Yellowknife Curling Centre in Yellowknife, Northwest Territories. The winning Kerry Galusha rink represented the Northwest Territories at the 2021 Scotties Tournament of Hearts in Calgary, Alberta, and finished with a 4–4 record, just missing the championship round. The event was held in conjunction with the 2021 Northwest Territories Men's Curling Championship, the territorial men's championship.

Kerry Galusha won her 18th territorial championship by defeating Cassie Rogers 10–6 in the final. The event was held in a three team round robin between Galusha, Rogers and Sarah Stroeder.

== Teams ==
The teams are listed as follows:

Skip	Third	Second	Lead	Alternate	Club
Kerry Galusha	Jo-Ann Rizzo	Margot Flemming	Shona Barbour		Yellowknife Curling Centre, Yellowknife
Cassie Rogers	Chasity O'Keefe	Kali Skauge	Grace Twa	Parker Waddell	Yellowknife Curling Centre, Yellowknife
Sarah Stroeder	Sharon Cormier	Megan Koehler	Anneli Jokela	Melissa Kennedy	Yellowknife Curling Centre, Yellowknife

== Round-robin standings ==
Final round-robin standings

Skip	W	L
Kerry Galusha	2	0
Cassie Rogers	1	1
Sarah Stroeder	0	2

== Round-robin results ==
All draws are listed in Mountain Standard Time (UTC−07:00).

=== Draw 1 ===
Saturday, January 30, 10:00 am

Sheet D	1	2	3	4	5	6	7	8	9	10	Final
Sarah Stroeder	0	1	0	1	0	1	0	0	X	X	3
Kerry Galusha	2	0	1	0	3	0	1	3	X	X	10

=== Draw 2 ===
Saturday, January 30, 4:30 pm

Sheet D	1	2	3	4	5	6	7	8	9	10	Final
Kerry Galusha	0	0	0	4	1	0	3	0	2	X	10
Cassie Rogers	0	2	1	0	0	1	0	1	0	X	5

=== Draw 3 ===
Sunday, January 31, 10:00 am

Sheet D	1	2	3	4	5	6	7	8	9	10	Final
Cassie Rogers	1	0	0	1	1	0	2	0	0	2	7
Sarah Stroeder	0	1	0	0	0	3	0	2	0	0	6

== Final ==
Sunday, January 31, 4:30 pm

Sheet D	1	2	3	4	5	6	7	8	9	10	Final
Kerry Galusha	0	3	0	3	0	3	0	0	1	X	10
Cassie Rogers	0	0	2	0	1	0	1	2	0	X	6

2021 Northwest Territories Scotties Tournament of Hearts
(Northwest Territories)
Kerry Galusha
18th Territorial Championship title
