= Shona Barbour =

Canadian curler (born 1979)

- Curler
- Born: July 4, 1979 (age 47); Calgary, Alberta

Team
- Curling club: Yellowknife CC, Yellowknife, NT
- Skip: Kerry Galusha
- Third: Megan Koehler
- Second: Sydney Galusha
- Lead: Shona Barbour
- Alternate: Ella Skauge

Curling career
- Member Association: Northwest Territories
- Hearts: 15 (2005, 2008, 2009, 2011, 2012, 2013, 2015, 2016, 2017, 2018, 2019, 2020, 2021, 2024, 2025)
- Top CTRS ranking: 40th (2011–12)
Medal record
Women's curling
Representing Northwest Territories
Arctic Winter Games
Gold medal – first place	1996 Anchorage

Shona Barbour (born July 4, 1979) is a Canadian curler from Yellowknife, Northwest Territories. She currently plays lead on Team Kerry Galusha.

== Career ==
=== Juniors ===
Barbour made her first national debut at the 1995 Canadian Junior Curling Championships, playing second stones for Tara Hamer. The team ended up finishing round robin with a 3–8 record. In 1996 Barbour returned to the juniors once more, this time throwing third stones for Kerry Koe. The team finished round robin with a 5–7 record. Barbour made her final junior appearance in 1998, playing third for Koe, and again failed to make the playoffs, finishing round robin with a 2–10 record.

=== 2005–2009 ===
It was not until 2005 that Barbour return to national stage. She made her first Scott appearance at the 2005 Scott Tournament of Hearts, as the alternate for Koe. The team finished round robin with a 4–7 record.

At the 2008 Scotties Tournament of Hearts Barbour returned as the alternate for Kerry Galusha. The team lost their first six games and following draw nine, Galusha moved from throwing third rocks, to lead rocks. The change did not help, as the team lost three more games before winning their first. They finished round robin with a 1–10 record.

In 2009 Barbour became a member of the Galusha team throwing second stones. The made history at the 2009 Scotties Tournament of Hearts, when they beat the defending champions Team Canada Jennifer Jones. This was the first time a team from the Northwest Territories defeated the defending champions in a Scotties tournament. It was the second time in the history of the Scotties a team from the Northwest Territories/Yukon defeated the defending champion during round robin play. The first was at the 1987 Scott Tournament of Hearts, when the Yukon's Shelly Aucoin defeated Marilyn Darte. This victory over team Canada earned the Galusha team the 2009 Sport North Team of the Year Award. That year Galusha's team finished 4–7.

=== 2011–2012 ===
In 2011 Barbour and the team once again won the 2011 Yukon/NWT Scotties Tournament of Hearts Territorial championship, finishing 5–1. She went on to represent the Yukon/Northwest Territories at the 2011 Scotties Tournament of Hearts, this time playing lead, where the team finished round robin with a 3–8 record.

For the 2011–12 curling season, Galusha, Barbour, and second Wendy Miller added Sharon Cormier and Megan Cormier to the team, creating a five-person team. Barbour, Miller and M. Cormier would alternate between lead, second and fifth. Barbour played lead with Miller at second, and second with M.Cormier at lead. With this combination, the team found early success during the 2011/2012 season. During the World Curling Tour, they defeated defending Canadian champion Amber Holland, and Olympic Silver Medalist Cheryl Bernard, and for the first time qualified for the playoffs during a tour event. They advanced to the playoffs at the 2011 Boundary Ford Curling Classic, however they lost the quarterfinal to Edmonton's Tiffany Odegard. The team qualified for the 2012 Scotties Tournament of Hearts. At the 2012 event, things started off well, with Galusha winning the 2012 Ford Hot Shots, and the team starting off with a 2–1 record in the first three games. After catching the flu, which was heavily circulating amongst all teams, Galusha missed two games, one of which found second Miller sitting out with the flu. This left three players on the ice. M.Cormier threw the first three stones, Barbour threw the next three stones, and S.Cormier threw the final two skip stones. The team could not recover from Galusha's absence and would finish round robin with a 4–7 record. Although the team finished with a disappointing record, it marked a second occasion for Barbour defeating the defending champions, Team Canada (Amber Holland) during round robin, marking the fourth time in history, a team from the Territories would achieve this. They also defeated the eventual champions, Team Alberta's Heather Nedohin.

=== 2012–2016 ===
Barbour did not curl competitively between 2012 and 2014, though she was the alternate for the Galusha-led Northwest Territories team at the 2013 Scotties Tournament of Hearts, where she played in just one game. She was back on the team playing lead in 2014. The team played in two tour events in the 2014-15 curling season, the Crestwood Ladies Fall Classic, and the 2014 Curlers Corner Autumn Gold Curling Classic Grand Slam event, where they won just one game. The team won the 2015 Northwest Territories Scotties Tournament of Hearts, the first year the territory received its own berth into the national championship. At the 2015 Scotties Tournament of Hearts, the team had to play in the pre-qualifying tournament, where they lost in the final.

For the 2015-16 curling season, the team played in two tour events, the Crestwood Ladies Fall Classic and the StuSells Toronto Tankard. The team won the 2016 Northwest Territories Scotties Tournament of Hearts, but again failed to get out of the prequalifying tournament at the 2016 Scotties Tournament of Hearts.

=== 2016–present ===
Barbour did not curl competitively with the Galusha rink during the 2016–17 season, but was the alternate on the team at the 2017 Scotties Tournament of Hearts. There, the team did make it out of the pre-qualifier, and finished the tournament with a 5–6 record and a seventh-place finish. Barbour, however, did not play in any matches. Barbour was back on the team for the 2017–18 season. The team won the 2018 Northwest Territories Scotties Tournament of Hearts and represented the NWT at the 2018 Scotties Tournament of Hearts. This time, the pre-qualifier was removed from the event. The team finished with a 1–6 record in pool play, and then beat Prince Edward Island in the thirteenth place game.

The next season, team won their first World Curling Tour event, the 2018 Royal LePage Women's Fall Classic. Team Galusha easily won the 2019 Northwest Territories Scotties Tournament of Hearts, winning all three of her games in a best of five series against the Tyanna Bain junior rink from Inuvik. At the 2019 Scotties Tournament of Hearts, the Galusha rink had a strong start, winning three of their first four games, before losing three straight, and were eliminated after pool play with a 3–4 record.

The Galusha rink added experienced player Jo-Ann Rizzo for the 2019–20 season. They had some success on the tour, having a quarterfinal finish at the 2019 AMJ Campbell Shorty Jenkins Classic and reaching the semifinals of the Stu Sells Toronto Tankard. They defended their territorial title by winning the 2020 Northwest Territories Scotties Tournament of Hearts in January 2020. At the 2020 Scotties Tournament of Hearts, they finished 2–5, not enough to advance to the championship pool. After the season, Barbour announced she would be stepping back from competitive curling and later announced that she would begin coaching the Galusha rink. The following season, Team Galusha again won the 2021 Northwest Territories Scotties Tournament of Hearts, however, Sarah Koltun did not compete with the team as the Hearts were to be held in a bio-secure "bubble" to prevent spread of the COVID-19 virus. Barbour took Koltun's place in the lineup, sliding in to play lead. At the 2021 Scotties Tournament of Hearts, Team Galusha finished the round robin with a 4–4 record, just missing the championship pool.

Team Galusha had a great start to the 2021–22 season, beginning with the Stu Sells Oakville Tankard where they lost in the final to Team Hollie Duncan. The following week, they won the KW Fall Classic after defeating the Duncan rink in the championship game. Due to the COVID-19 pandemic in Canada, the qualification process for the 2021 Canadian Olympic Curling Trials had to be modified to qualify enough teams for the championship. In these modifications, Curling Canada created the 2021 Canadian Curling Pre-Trials Direct-Entry Event, an event where eight teams would compete to try to earn one of two spots into the 2021 Canadian Olympic Curling Pre-Trials. Team Galusha qualified for the Pre-Trials Direct-Entry Event as the fourth seed. The team qualified for the playoffs by going 3–0 in the A Event and then defeated Team Robyn Silvernagle (skipped by Jessie Hunkin) 10–8 to earn the first spot in the Pre-Trials. The next month, the team competed in the Pre-Trials where they finished with a 1–5 record, only beating Team Penny Barker. The 2022 Northwest Territories Scotties Tournament of Hearts was cancelled due to the pandemic and Team Galusha were selected to represent the Territories at the national women's championship. At the 2022 Scotties Tournament of Hearts, the team finished the round robin with a 5–3 record, qualifying them for a tiebreaker against Manitoba's Mackenzie Zacharias. Team Galusha won the tiebreaker 8–6, earning themselves a spot in the playoffs and becoming the first team solely representing the Northwest Territories to qualify for the playoffs in Scotties history. They then lost in the first game of the playoff round to New Brunswick's Andrea Crawford and were eliminated from contention.

To begin the 2022–23 season, Team Galusha reached the quarterfinals of the 2022 Saville Shoot-Out where they lost to Casey Scheidegger. They then played in the 2022 PointsBet Invitational where they again lost to the Scheidegger rink in the opening round. The team continued to have success on tour in October, reaching the semifinals of the 2022 Tour Challenge Tier 2 Slam and the quarterfinals of the North Grenville Women's Fall Curling Classic. In the new year, they again went undefeated to win the 2023 Northwest Territories Scotties Tournament of Hearts, defeating Reese Wainman 8–1 in the final. Representing the Territories at the 2023 Scotties Tournament of Hearts, Team Galusha started the event with a 3–1 record before losing their next three games. They won their final game against the Yukon to finish fourth in their pool with a 4–4 record, missing the playoffs.

The Galusha rink did not have as much success on tour the following season, only reaching the playoffs in two of their first six events. This included a semifinal finish at the Alberta Tour Kick-off and a quarterfinal appearance at the 2023 KW Fall Classic. In December, the team went undefeated at the Stu Sells Brantford Nissan Classic until the final where they lost to Courtney Auld. After winning the 2024 Northwest Territories Scotties Tournament of Hearts, the team announced the 2024 Scotties Tournament of Hearts would be their last event together as they would disband at the end of the season. At the Hearts, the team finished fifth in their pool with a 3–5 record. This included defeating Manitoba's Jennifer Jones in their final round robin game and having the largest comeback in Scotties history, overcoming a seven-point deficit after three ends to defeat Ontario's Danielle Inglis 10–9.

== Personal life ==
Barbour works as a career and education advisor for the Department of Education, Culture and Employment in the Government of the Northwest Territories.
