= Kerry Galusha =

Canadian curler (born 1977)

- Curler
- Born: Kerry Koe; November 3, 1977 (age 49); Yellowknife, Northwest Territories, Canada

Curling career
- Member Association: Northwest Territories
- Hearts: 22 (1998, 2001, 2002, 2005, 2006, 2007, 2008, 2009, 2011, 2012, 2013, 2015, 2016, 2017, 2018, 2019, 2020, 2021, 2022, 2023, 2024, 2025)
- Top CTRS ranking: 14th (2021–22)
Medal record
Women's curling
Representing Northwest Territories
Arctic Winter Games
Gold medal – first place	1996 Anchorage
Silver medal – second place	1994 Slave Lake

Kerry Galusha (born Kerry Koe on November 3, 1977) is a Canadian curler.

== Career ==
=== Juniors ===
Galusha's first national experience was at the 1992 Canadian Junior Curling Championships. She was the fifth player for Janet Sian. The team would finish in eleventh place with a 2–9 record.

She would return to the junior championships again in 1993, this time playing third stones for Tara Hamer. The team would finish in tenth place with a 2–9 record. The team would return again in 1994, finishing with a 5–6 record.

By 1995 Galusha was returning to her fourth junior championship, her final year with Hamer. The team would end up finishing round robin with a 3–8 record. In 1996 Galusha would return to the juniors once more, this time she would be skipping her own team. The team would finish round robin with a 5–7 record.

Galusha would make her final junior appearance at the 1998 Canadian Juniors and again would fail to make the playoffs, finishing round robin with a 2–10 record.

=== 1998–2002 ===
Galusha would make her first Scotties appearance at the 1998 Scott Tournament of Hearts as an alternate for Kelly Kaylo. The team would finish round robin with a 5–6 record, missing the playoffs.

The 2001 Scott Tournament of Hearts, was the first time Galusha would represent the Territories as a skip. Her team finished last place, with a round robin record of 2–9. Galusha would return a year later to the 2002 Scott Tournament of Hearts, as a fifth player for Monigue Gagnier. The team finished round robin with a 4–7 record.

=== 2005–2009 ===
It wasn't until 2005 that Galusha would return to the Scotties, this would be the start of five consecutive years representing the Territories. At the 2005 Scott Tournament of Hearts Galusha would make a slight change, throwing third rocks while skipping the game. The 4th rock thrower was Monigue Gagnier, and the team would finish round robin with a 4–7 record.

At the 2006 Scott Tournament of Hearts, Gagnier continued throwing fourth stones, and the team finished round robin with a 2–9 record. Galusha would also participate in the 2006 Canadian Mixed Curling Championship, as a third for her brother Jamie. The team would finish round robin with a 6–5 record.

Galusha would also find difficulties at the 2007 Scotties Tournament of Hearts, her team would again finish round robin with a 2–9 record.

Galusha would come into more difficulties at the 2008 Scotties Tournament of Hearts. The team would lose their first six games and following draw nine, Galusha would move from throwing third rocks, to lead rocks. The change did not help, as the team lost three more games before winning their first. They would finish round robin with a 1–10 record.

In 2009 Galusha's team made history at the 2009 Scotties Tournament of Hearts, when they beat the defending champions Team Canada Jennifer Jones. This was the first time a team from the Northwest Territories defeated the defending champions in a Scotties tournament. It was the second time in the history of the Scotties a team from the Northwest Territories/Yukon defeated the defending champion during round robin play. The first was at the 1987 Scott Tournament of Hearts, when the Yukon's Shelly Aucoin defeated Marilyn Darte. During the 5th end break of the final coverage, a video of Galusha, and her brother Jamie, was shown talking about how big the victory over the defending champions was for the Territories. This victory over team Canada earn the Galusha team the 2009 Sport North Team of the Year Award. That year Galusha's team finished 4–7.

=== 2011–2014 ===
In 2011 Galusha once again won the 2011 Northwest Territories/Yukon Scotties Tournament of Hearts Territorial championship, finishing 5–1. She would go on to represent the Yukon/Northwest Territories at the 2011 Scotties Tournament of Hearts, where her team finished round robin with a 3–8 record.

Galusha and her team found early success during the 2011/2012 season. During the World Curling Tour, they defeated defending Canadian champion Amber Holland, and Olympic Silver Medalist Cheryl Bernard, and for the first time qualified for the playoffs during a tour event. They advanced to the playoffs at the 2011 Boundary Ford Curling Classic, however they would lose the quarterfinal to Edmonton's Tiffany Odegard. Her team qualified for the 2012 Scotties Tournament of Hearts. At the 2012 event, Galusha would start off well, winning the 2012 Ford Hot Shots, and starting off with a 2–1 record in the first three games. After catching the flu, which was heavily circulating amongst all teams, Galusha would miss two games, one of which found second Wendy Miller sitting out with the flu, leaving three players on the ice. The team could not recover from Galusha's absence and would finish round robin with a 4–7 record. Although the team finished with a disappointing record, it would mark a second occasion for Galusha defeating the defending champions, Team Canada (Amber Holland) during round robin. Marking the fourth time in history, a team from the Territories would achieve this. They would also defeat the eventual champions, Team Alberta's Heather Nedohin. The team returned to the Scotties once again in 2013. At the 2013 Scotties Tournament of Hearts, they would finish with a 2–9 record, but once again defeated the defending champion along the way, when they beat Nedohin for the second straight year. For the first time in ten years, Galusha lost in the territorial playdowns, losing 6–4 to the Yukon's Sarah Koltun in the playoff at the 2014 NWT/Yukon Scotties Tournament of Hearts.

=== 2015–present ===
Beginning in 2015, the Northwest Territories gained a separate entry from the Yukon at the national championship. Galusha won the 2015 Northwest Territories Scotties Tournament of Hearts over Ann McKellar-Gillis, and represented the Northwest Territories at the 2015 Scotties Tournament of Hearts. There, the team had to play in a pre-qualifying tournament that was necessitated by having both territories (and the addition of Northern Ontario) have a direct entry to the Scotties. While she beat the Yukon in the tournament, she lost both of her matches against Northern Ontario's Tracy Horgan, failing to qualify for the main tournament.

Galusha beat Hay River's Judy Goucher in the final of the 2016 Northwest Territories Scotties Tournament of Hearts, and represented the NWT at the 2016 Scotties Tournament of Hearts. She once again could not get out of the pre-qualifying tournament, losing to British Columbia's Karla Thompson rink in the pre-qualifier final.

In 2017, Galusha's team was not challenged for the Northwest Territories title, and received a direct entry to the 2017 Scotties Tournament of Hearts. This time, she would make it out of the pre-qualifying tournament, after beating New Brunswick's Melissa Adams in the final. In the main event, Galusha led the Northwest Territories team to a respectable 5–6 record.

For the 2017–18 season, Galusha added the Yukon's Sarah Koltun to her team at third. Team Galusha went undefeated at the 2018 Northwest Territories Scotties Tournament of Hearts. The format at the national 2018 Scotties Tournament of Hearts had changed again, putting sixteen teams into two pools of eight teams. Galusha led the NWT to a 1–6 record in her pool, only beating the Yukon. This put them into the thirteenth place game against Prince Edward Island's Robyn MacPhee rink, which they won.

The following season, the Galusha rink added former Canadian Junior champion Brittany Tran to the team at second. The team won their first World Curling Tour event, the 2018 Royal LePage Women's Fall Classic. Team Galusha easily won the 2019 Northwest Territories Scotties Tournament of Hearts, winning all three of her games in a best of five series against the Tyanna Bain junior rink from Inuvik. At the 2019 Scotties Tournament of Hearts, the Galusha rink had a strong start, winning three of their first four games, before losing three straight, and were eliminated after pool play with a 3–4 record.

The Galusha rink added experienced player Jo-Ann Rizzo for the 2019–20 season. They had some success on the tour, having a quarterfinal finish at the 2019 AMJ Campbell Shorty Jenkins Classic and reaching the semifinals of the Stu Sells Toronto Tankard. They defended their territorial title by winning the 2020 Northwest Territories Scotties Tournament of Hearts in January 2020. At the 2020 Scotties Tournament of Hearts, they finished 2–5, not enough to advance to the championship pool. The following season, Team Galusha again won the 2021 Northwest Territories Scotties Tournament of Hearts. At the 2021 Scotties Tournament of Hearts, Galusha led her team to a 4–4 round robin record, just missing the championship pool.

Team Galusha had a great start to the 2021–22 season, beginning with the Stu Sells Oakville Tankard where they lost in the final to Team Hollie Duncan. The following week, they won the KW Fall Classic after defeating the Duncan rink in the championship game. Due to the COVID-19 pandemic in Canada, the qualification process for the 2021 Canadian Olympic Curling Trials had to be modified to qualify enough teams for the championship. In these modifications, Curling Canada created the 2021 Canadian Curling Pre-Trials Direct-Entry Event, an event where eight teams would compete to try to earn one of two spots into the 2021 Canadian Olympic Curling Pre-Trials. Team Galusha qualified for the Pre-Trials Direct-Entry Event as the fourth seed. The team qualified for the playoffs by going 3–0 in the A Event and then defeated Team Robyn Silvernagle (skipped by Jessie Hunkin) 10–8 to earn the first spot in the Pre-Trials. The next month, the team competed in the Pre-Trials where they finished with a 1–5 record, only beating Team Penny Barker. The 2022 Northwest Territories Scotties Tournament of Hearts was cancelled due to the pandemic and Team Galusha were selected to represent the Territories at the national women's championship. At the 2022 Scotties Tournament of Hearts, the team finished the round robin with a 5–3 record, qualifying them for a tiebreaker against Manitoba's Mackenzie Zacharias. Team Galusha won the tiebreaker 8–6, earning themselves a spot in the playoffs and becoming the first team solely representing the Northwest Territories to qualify for the playoffs in Scotties history. They then lost in the first game of the playoff round to New Brunswick's Andrea Crawford and were eliminated from contention.

To begin the 2022–23 season, Team Galusha reached the quarterfinals of the 2022 Saville Shoot-Out where they lost to Casey Scheidegger. They then played in the 2022 PointsBet Invitational where they again lost to the Scheidegger rink in the opening round. The team continued to have success on tour in October, reaching the semifinals of the 2022 Tour Challenge Tier 2 Slam and the quarterfinals of the North Grenville Women's Fall Curling Classic. In the new year, they again went undefeated to win the 2023 Northwest Territories Scotties Tournament of Hearts, defeating Reese Wainman 8–1 in the final. Representing the Territories at the 2023 Scotties Tournament of Hearts, Team Galusha started the event with a 3–1 record before losing their next three games. They won their final game against the Yukon to finish fourth in their pool with a 4–4 record, missing the playoffs.

The Galusha rink did not have as much success on tour the following season, only reaching the playoffs in two of their first six events. This included a semifinal finish at the Alberta Tour Kick-off and a quarterfinal appearance at the 2023 KW Fall Classic. In December, the team went undefeated at the Stu Sells Brantford Nissan Classic until the final where they lost to Courtney Auld. After winning the 2024 Northwest Territories Scotties Tournament of Hearts, the team announced the 2024 Scotties Tournament of Hearts would be their last event together as they would disband at the end of the season. At the Hearts, the team finished fifth in their pool with a 3–5 record. This included defeating Manitoba's Jennifer Jones in their final round robin game and having the largest comeback in Scotties history, overcoming a seven-point deficit after three ends to defeat Ontario's Danielle Inglis 10–9.

Galusha formed a new team for the 2024–25 season, curling with Megan Koehler, Shona Barbour, and daughter Sydney Galusha. Galusha won the 2025 Northwest Territories Women's Curling Championship, her 21st Northwest Territories Championship title. Prior to the 2025 Scotties Tournament of Hearts, Galusha announced that this Scotties will be her last as a player, as she will be retiring from competitive curling at the end of the season. Galusha finished her last Scotties with a 3–5 record, missing the playoffs. Over her 19 official appearances at the Scotties, she finished with a grand total of 173 official games played at the Scotties, which tied her with Mary-Anne Arsenault for 4th all time in total career games played.

Galusha currently coaches the Nicky Kaufman rink.

== Personal life ==
Galusha is the sister of Canadian curler Kevin Koe, who skips a team out of Alberta, and twin sister of curler Jamie Koe, who skips a team out of the Northwest Territories. She works for the Government of the Northwest Territories as a finance officer for the Department of Justice. She is married and has a daughter, Sydney who is also a competitive curler.

== Grand Slam record ==
Key
C	Champion
F	Lost in Final
SF	Lost in Semifinal
QF	Lost in Quarterfinals
R16	Lost in the round of 16
Q	Did not advance to playoffs
T2	Played in Tier 2 event
DNP	Did not participate in event
N/A	Not a Grand Slam event that season

Event	2006–07	2007–08	2008–09	2009–10	2010–11	2011–12	2012–13	2013–14	2014–15
Autumn Gold	Q	DNP	DNP	Q	Q	Q	Q	DNP	Q
