= 2013 NWT/Yukon Scotties Tournament of Hearts =

- Host city: Fort Smith, Northwest Territories
- Arena: Fort Smith Curling Club
- Dates: January 11–13
- Winner: Kerry Galusha
- Curling club: Yellowknife Curling Club
- Skip: Kerry Galusha
- Third: Sharon Cormier
- Second: Megan Cormier
- Lead: Wendy Miller
- Alternate: Shona Barbour
- Finalist: Ashley Green

The 2013 NWT/Yukon Scotties Tournament of Hearts, the women's provincial curling championship for the Northwest Territories and Yukon, was held from January 11 to 13 at the Fort Smith Curling Club in Fort Smith, Northwest Territories. The winning team of Kerry Galusha will represent NWT/Yukon at the 2013 Scotties Tournament of Hearts in Kingston, Ontario.

The championship was originally scheduled to be held from January 24 to 27 at the Whitehorse Curling Club in Whitehorse, Yukon, but the Yukon Curling Association announced it would not be sending teams to the event. Therefore, the Northwest Territories Scotties Tournament of Hearts alone will constitute the NWT/Yukon Scotties Tournament of Hearts, and the winner of the Northwest Territories Scotties Tournament of Hearts will determine the region's representative at the 2013 Scotties Tournament of Hearts.

== Teams ==
Skip	Third	Second	Lead	Alternate	Locale
Brittany Brasser	Deborah Price	Cheryl Hval	Natalie Nickolson		Fort Smith Curling Club, Fort Smith
Kerry Galusha	Sharon Cormier	Megan Cormier	Wendy Miller	Shona Barbour	Yellowknife Curling Club, Yellowknife
Ashley Green	Janis O'Keefe	Danielle Ellis	Leslie Merrithew		Yellowknife Curling Club, Yellowknife

== Round-robin standings ==
Skip (Club)	W	L	PF	PA	Ends Won	Ends Lost	Blank Ends
Kerry Galusha (Yellowknife)	3	1	37	24	19	15	0
Ashley Green (Yellowknife)	3	1	40	27	18	15	1
Brittany Brasser (Fort Smith)	0	4	19	45	12	19	1

== Round-robin results ==
All draw times are listed in Mountain Standard Time (UTC-7).

=== Draw 1 ===
Friday, January 11, 1:30 pm

Sheet 1	1	2	3	4	5	6	7	8	9	10	Final
Kerry Galusha	1	1	2	1	0	2	0	2	0	X	9
Ashley Green	0	0	0	0	1	0	3	0	2	X	6

=== Draw 2 ===
Friday, January 11, 6:00 pm

Sheet 3	1	2	3	4	5	6	7	8	9	10	Final
Brittany Brasser	0	0	0	1	1	0	2	0	1	1	6
Kerry Galusha	1	3	1	0	0	1	0	3	0	0	9

=== Draw 3 ===
Saturday, January 12, 8:30 am

Sheet 2	1	2	3	4	5	6	7	8	9	10	Final
Ashley Green	0	1	0	2	5	1	0	2	1	X	12
Brittany Brasser	2	0	3	0	0	0	2	0	0	X	7

=== Draw 4 ===
Saturday, January 12, 12:30 pm

Sheet 3	1	2	3	4	5	6	7	8	9	10	Final
Kerry Galusha	0	0	1	0	3	0	2	0	1	X	7
Ashley Green	1	2	0	1	0	4	0	2	0	X	10

=== Draw 5 ===
Saturday, January 12, 12:30 pm

Sheet 3	1	2	3	4	5	6	7	8	9	10	Final
Brittany Brasser	1	0	0	0	0	1	X	X	X	X	2
Kerry Galusha	0	3	3	2	4	0	X	X	X	X	12

=== Draw 6 ===
Sunday, January 13, 8:30 am

Sheet 1	1	2	3	4	5	6	7	8	9	10	Final
Ashley Green	0	0	3	2	0	4	3	X	X	X	12
Brittany Brasser	0	1	0	0	3	0	0	X	X	X	4

=== Tie breaker ===
Sunday, January 13, 12:30 pm

Team	1	2	3	4	5	6	7	8	9	10	Final
Kerry Galusha	1	0	1	0	4	1	0	3	X	X	10
Ashley Green	0	1	0	1	0	0	1	0	X	X	3

2013 NWT/Yukon Scotties Tournament of Hearts
(Northwest Territories)
Kerry Galusha
10th NWT/Yukon Provincial Championship title
