= 2011 NWT/Yukon Scotties Tournament of Hearts =

The 2011 NWT/Yukon Scotties Tournament of Hearts was held January 27–30 at the Whitehorse Curling Club in Whitehorse, Yukon. The winning team of Kerry Galusha represented Yukon/NWT at the 2011 Scotties Tournament of Hearts in Charlottetown, Prince Edward Island, where they finished round robin play with a record of 3–8.

== Teams ==
Skip	Vice	Second	Lead	Club
Nicole Baldwin	Kerry Campbell	Ladene Shaw	Lisa Abel	Whitehorse Curling Club, Whitehorse
Sharon Cormier	Tara Naugler	Megan Cormier	Danielle Ellis	Yellowknife Curling Club, Yellowknife
Kerry Galusha	Dawn Moses	Wendy Miller	Shona Barbour	Yellowknife Curling Club, Yellowknife
Jamie Hewitt	Leslie Grant	Corinne Delaire	Dianne Huber	Whitehorse Curling Club, Whitehorse

== Standings ==
Skip (Club)	W	L	PF	PA	Ends Won	Ends Lost	Blank Ends	Stolen Ends
Kerry Galusha (Yellowknife)	5	1	55	40	33	27	1	12
Sharon Cormier (Yellowknife)	4	2	44	39	32	19	6	6
Nicole Baldwin (Whitehorse)	2	4	41	42	26	26	6	10
Jamie Hewitt (Whitehorse)	1	5	29	49	23	30	3	7

== Results ==
=== Draw 1 ===
January 27, 2:00 PM

Sheet 2	1	2	3	4	5	6	7	8	9	10	Final
Baldwin	1	0	1	2	0	2	1	3	X	X	10
Hewitt	0	1	0	0	0	0	0	0	X	X	1

Sheet 3	1	2	3	4	5	6	7	8	9	10	Final
Cormier	0	0	1	1	1	1	0	2	0	X	6
Galusha	4	3	0	0	0	0	3	0	1	X	11

=== Draw 2 ===
January 28, 9:30 AM

Sheet 6	1	2	3	4	5	6	7	8	9	10	11	Final
Galusha	2	0	1	0	0	1	0	0	2	2	3	11
Baldwin	0	2	0	2	1	0	2	1	0	0	0	8

Sheet 7	1	2	3	4	5	6	7	8	9	10	Final
Hewitt	0	0	1	1	0	1	0	1	0	X	4
Cormier	1	2	0	0	1	0	2	0	4	X	10

=== Draw 3 ===
January 28, 2:30 PM

Sheet 2	1	2	3	4	5	6	7	8	9	10	11	Final
Galusha	0	0	1	0	1	1	1	1	0	2	0	7
Cormier	0	3	0	1	0	0	0	0	3	0	1	8

Sheet 3	1	2	3	4	5	6	7	8	9	10	11	Final
Hewitt	0	0	1	1	1	0	2	0	1	0	0	6
Baldwin	0	2	0	0	0	1	0	2	0	1	2	8

=== Draw 4 ===
January 29, 1:00 PM

Sheet 4	1	2	3	4	5	6	7	8	9	10	Final
Baldwin	0	0	0	0	0	1	0	0	X	X	1
Cormier	2	0	0	0	2	0	0	1	X	X	5

Sheet 5	1	2	3	4	5	6	7	8	9	10	Final
Galusha	1	1	1	0	1	0	1	0	1	X	6
Hewitt	0	0	0	1	0	1	0	1	0	X	3

=== Draw 5 ===
January 29, 6:00 PM

Sheet 6	1	2	3	4	5	6	7	8	9	10	Final
Cormier	0	1	0	1	0	2	0	1	0	0	5
Hewitt	2	0	0	0	2	0	1	0	1	2	8

Sheet 7	1	2	3	4	5	6	7	8	9	10	11	Final
Baldwin	1	2	2	0	2	0	0	0	1	0	0	8
Galusha	0	0	0	1	0	1	1	3	0	2	1	9

=== Draw 6 ===
January 30, 10:00 AM

Sheet 5	1	2	3	4	5	6	7	8	9	10	11	Final
Cormier	0	0	1	0	3	0	3	0	2	0	1	10
Baldwin	1	1	0	2	0	3	0	1	0	1	0	9

Sheet 4	1	2	3	4	5	6	7	8	9	10	Final
Hewitt	0	1	1	2	0	1	2	0	0	0	7
Galusha	2	0	0	0	2	0	0	2	3	1	10
