= Northwest Territories/Yukon Scotties Tournament of Hearts =

The Northwest Territories/Yukon Scotties Tournament of Hearts was the regional women's curling championship for the Northwest Territories and Yukon. The winning team represented Team Northwest Territories/Yukon at the Scotties Tournament of Hearts until 2014. Beginning in 2015, both territories were awarded direct entries to the Scotties.

== Past winners ==
Year	Skip	Hearts rec.
2014	(Yukon) Sarah Koltun	2–9 (T11th)
2013	(Northwest Territories) Kerry Galusha	2–9 (T10th)
2012	(Northwest Territories) Kerry Galusha	4–7 (T8th)
2011	(Northwest Territories) Kerry Galusha	3–8 (T10th)
2010	(Northwest Territories) Sharon Cormier	4–7 (T8th)
2009	(Northwest Territories) Kerry Galusha	4–7 (10th)
2008	(Northwest Territories) Kerry Galusha	1–10 (T11th)
2007	(Northwest Territories) Kerry Koe	2–9 (11th)
2006	(Northwest Territories) Kerry Koe	2–9 (T11th)
2005	(Northwest Territories) Kerry Koe	4–7 (T9th)
2004	(Northwest Territories) Stacy Stabel	1–10 (12th)
2003	(Northwest Territories) Dawn Moses	2–9 (12th)
2002	(Northwest Territories) Monique Gagnier	4–7 (T8th)
2001	(Northwest Territories) Kerry Koe	2–9 (12th)
2000	(Yukon) Sandra Hatton	0–11 (12th)
1999	(Northwest Territories) Maureen Miller	4–7 (T9th)
1998	(Northwest Territories) Kelly Kaylo	5–6 (T6th)
1997	(Northwest Territories) Kelly Kaylo	4–7 (T9th)
1996	(Yukon) Donna Scott	1–10 (12th)
1995	(Yukon) Dawn Moses	1–10 (11th)
1994	(Yukon) Shelley Aucoin	4–7 (T7th)
1993	(Northwest Territories) Kelly Kaylo	4–7 (10th)
1992	(Yukon) Dawn Moses	4–7 (T7th)
1991	(Yukon) Anna Lindgren	4–7 (9th)
1990	(Yukon) Kathleen Chapman	2–9 (12th)
1989	(Northwest Territories) Shirley King	2–9 (11th)
1988	(Yukon) Shelley Aucoin	2–9 (12th)
1987	(Yukon) Shelley Aucoin	6–5 (T6th)
1986	(Yukon) Shelley Aucoin	3–8 (T10th)
1985	(Yukon) Shelly Bidfield	6–4 (5th)
1984	(Northwest Territories) Maureen Moss	1–9 (T10th)
1983	(Yukon) Shelly Bidfield	8–3 (3rd)
1982	(Yukon) Arenlea Felker	3–7 (T8th)
1981	(Northwest Territories) Donna Alexander	6–4 (T4th)
1980	(Northwest Territories) Cathy Shaw	5–5 (6th)
1979	(Northwest Territories) Margaret Whitlock	1–9 (T9th)
1978	(Northwest Territories) Donna Alexander	2–8 (11th)
1977	(Northwest Territories) Donna Alexander	4–6 (T7th)

== See also ==
- Northwest Territories Scotties Tournament of Hearts
- Yukon Scotties Tournament of Hearts
