= 2011 Boundary Ford Curling Classic =

World Curling Tour event

- Host city: Lloydminster, Alberta
- Arena: Lloydminster Curling Club
- Dates: November 25–28
- Winner: (Alberta) Jessie Kaufman
- Curling club: Saville SC, Edmonton
- Skip: Jessie Kaufman
- Third: Nicky Kaufman
- Second: Amanda Coderre
- Lead: Stephanie Enright
- Finalist: (Alberta) Dana Ferguson

The 2011 Boundary Ford Curling Classic was held from November 25 to 28 at the Lloydminster Curling Club in Lloydminster, Alberta as part of the 2011–12 World Curling Tour. The purse for the event was CAD$32,000, and the event was held in a triple knockout format.

== Teams ==
Skip	Third	Second	Lead	Locale
Cheryl Bernard	Susan O'Connor	Lori Olson-Johns	Jennifer Sadleir	Calgary, Alberta
Brandee Borne	Kara Kilden	Andrea Rudulier	Jen Buettner	Saskatoon, Saskatchewan
Jolene Campbell	Melissa Hoffman	Maegan Clark	Michelle McIvor	Humboldt, Saskatchewan
Nadine Chyz	Rebecca Pattison	Whitney More	Kimberly Anderson	Calgary, Alberta
Michelle Corbeil	Dawn Corbiel	Krista Regnier	Alana Horn	Lloydminster, Alberta
Delia DeJong	Jessica Monk	Amy Janko	Aisha Veiner	Grande Prairie, Alberta
Glenys Bakker (fourth)	Heather Jensen	Brenda Doroshuk (skip)	Carly Quigley	Calgary, Alberta
Tanilla Doyle	Lindsay Amudsen-Meyer	Janice Bailey	Christina Faulkner	Calgary, Alberta
Chantelle Eberle	Nancy Inglis	Debbie Lozinski	Susan Hoffart	Regina, Saskatchewan
Lisa Eyamie	Maria Bushell	Jodi Marthaller	Kyla MacLachlan	Calgary, Alberta
Dana Ferguson	Nikki Smith	Denise Kinghorn	Cori Morris	Calgary, Alberta
Kerry Galusha	Sharon Cormier	Wendy Miller	Shona Barbour	Yellowknife, Northwest Territories
Lisa Johnson	Michelle Ries	Natalie Holloway	Shauna Nordstrom	Edmonton, Alberta
Jessie Kaufman	Nicky Kaufman	Amanda Coderre	Stephanie Enright	Edmonton, Alberta
Karli Makichuk	Sydney Lake	Tannis Steinacher	Kimberly Dunsmore	Lloydminster, Alberta
Chana Martineau	Lesley Ewoniak	Brittany Zelmer	Marie Graham	Edmonton, Alberta
Morgan Muise	Lyndsay Allen	Sarah Horne	Michelle Collin	Calgary, Alberta
Tiffany Odegard	Andrea McCutcheon	Jennifer Van Wieren	Heather Kushnir	Edmonton, Alberta
Sheri Pickering	Cheyanne Creasser	Karen Schiml	Donna Phillips	Calgary, Alberta
Vanessa Pouliot	Melissa Pierce	Megan Anderson	Jamie Forth	Edmonton, Alberta
Casey Scheidegger	Kalynn Park	Jessie Scheidegger	Joelle Horn	Lethbridge, Alberta
Jill Shumay	Kara Johnston	Taryn Holtby	Jinaye Ayrey	Saskatoon, Saskatchewan
Robyn Silvernagle	Kelsey Dutton	Dayna Demmans	Cristina Goertzen	Meadow Lake, Saskatchewan
Michele Smith (fourth)	Heather Armstrong	Shana Snell (skip)	Alanna Blackwell	Calgary, Alberta
Renée Sonnenberg	Lawnie MacDonald	Kristie Moore	Rona Pasika	Grande Prairie, Alberta
Tiffany Steuber	Lisa Miller	Jenilee Goertzen	Cindy Westgard	Edmonton, Alberta
Valerie Sweeting	Leslie Rogers	Joanne Taylor	Rachelle Pidherny	Edmonton, Alberta
Crystal Webster	Erin Carmody	Geri-Lynn Ramsay	Samantha Preston	Calgary, Alberta
Alicia Wenger	Jennifer Stiglitz	Ashlee Foster	Giselle Gervais	Lloydminster, Alberta
Holly Whyte	Heather Steele	Deanne Nichol	Carmen Barrack	Edmonton, Alberta
Nola Zingel	Heather Kuntz	Jill Watson	Melissa Martens	Lloydminster, Alberta

== Results ==
=== A Event ===
First Knockout
(Alberta) Delia DeJong	6
(Northwest Territories) Kerry Galusha	7
(Alberta) Lisa Eyamie	9
(Alberta) Tanilla Doyle	6
(Alberta) Nadine Chyz	9
(Saskatchewan) Jill Shumay	5
(Alberta) Jessie Kaufman	7
(Alberta) Michelle Corbeil	2
(Saskatchewan) Robyn Silvernagle	9
(Alberta) Tiffany Odegard	7
(Alberta) Valerie Sweeting	10
(Alberta) Morgan Muise	1
(Saskatchewan) Jolene Campbell	8
(Alberta) Lisa Johnson	3

Quarterfinals
(Alberta) Cheryl Bernard	9
(Northwest Territories) Kerry Galusha	10
(Alberta) Lisa Eyamie	6
(Alberta) Nadine Chyz	12
(Alberta) Jessie Kaufman	8
(Saskatchewan) Robyn Silvernagle	2
(Alberta) Valerie Sweeting	7
(Saskatchewan) Jolene Campbell	2

Semifinals
(Northwest Territories) Kerry Galusha	6
(Alberta) Nadine Chyz	11
(Alberta) Jessie Kaufman	3
(Alberta) Valerie Sweeting	5

Qualifier 1
(Alberta) Nadine Chyz	5
(Alberta) Valerie Sweeting	7

First Knockout
(Alberta) Renée Sonnenberg	9
(Alberta) Karli Makichuk	6
(Alberta) Tiffany Steuber	8
(Alberta) Alicia Wenger	6
(Saskatchewan) Chantelle Eberle	2
(Alberta) Sheri Pickering	9
(Alberta) Casey Scheidegger	6
(Alberta) Chana Martineau	2
(Alberta) Crystal Webster	9
(Alberta) Nola Zingel	2
(Alberta) Vanessa Pouliot	8
(Alberta) Holly Whyte	7
(Alberta) Dana Ferguson	6
(Alberta) Shana Snell	5
(Alberta) Brenda Doroshuk	5
(Saskatchewan) Brandee Borne	10

Quarterfinals
(Alberta) Renée Sonnenberg	7
(Alberta) Tiffany Steuber	3
(Alberta) Sheri Pickering	3
(Alberta) Casey Scheidegger	7
(Alberta) Crystal Webster	5
(Alberta) Vanessa Pouliot	6
(Alberta) Dana Ferguson	6
(Saskatchewan) Brandee Borne	5

Semifinals
(Alberta) Renée Sonnenberg	7
(Alberta) Casey Scheidegger	5
(Alberta) Vanessa Pouliot	3
(Alberta) Dana Ferguson	6

Qualifier 2
(Alberta) Renée Sonnenberg	6
(Alberta) Dana Ferguson	10

=== B Event ===
Second Knockout
(Alberta) Tanilla Doyle	2
(Saskatchewan) Jill Shumay	11
(Alberta) Michelle Corbeil	6
(Alberta) Tiffany Odegard	8
(Alberta) Morgan Muise	7
(Alberta) Lisa Johnson	2

Quarterfinals
(Alberta) Delia DeJong	8
(Saskatchewan) Jill Shumay	7
(Alberta) Tiffany Odegard	7
(Alberta) Morgan Muise	5

Semifinals
(Alberta) Delia DeJong	7
(Alberta) Casey Scheidegger	8
(Alberta) Tiffany Odegard	6
(Alberta) Vanessa Pouliot	5

To Qualifier 3
(Alberta) Casey Scheidegger	3
(Alberta) Tiffany Odegard	9

Second Knockout

Quarterfinals
(Alberta) Tiffany Steuber	7
(Alberta) Sheri Pickering	4
(Alberta) Crystal Webster	9
(Saskatchewan) Brandee Borne	6

Semifinals
(Alberta) Tiffany Steuber	7
(Alberta) Crystal Webster	8

To Qualifier 3
(Alberta) Crystal Webster	5
(Alberta) Nadine Chyz	9
Qualifier 3
(Alberta) Tiffany Odegard	8
(Alberta) Nadine Chyz	7

Second Knockout

Quarterfinals
(Alberta) Cheryl Bernard	7
(Alberta) Lisa Eyamie	4
(Saskatchewan) Robyn Silvernagle	6
(Saskatchewan) Jolene Campbell	7

Semifinals
(Alberta) Cheryl Bernard	7
(Saskatchewan) Jolene Campbell	2

To Qualifier 4
(Alberta) Cheryl Bernard	7
(Alberta) Renée Sonnenberg	4

Second Knockout
(Alberta) Karli Makichuk	10
(Alberta) Alicia Wenger	4
(Saskatchewan) Chantelle Eberle	7
(Alberta) Chana Martineau	1
(Alberta) Nola Zingel	4
(Alberta) Holly Whyte	7
(Alberta) Shana Snell	7
(Alberta) Brenda Doroshuk	6

Quarterfinals
(Alberta) Karli Makichuk	4
(Saskatchewan) Chantelle Eberle	7
(Alberta) Holly Whyte	10
(Alberta) Shana Snell	6

Semifinals
(Northwest Territories) Kerry Galusha	9
(Saskatchewan) Chantelle Eberle	2
(Alberta) Jessie Kaufman	4
(Alberta) Holly Whyte	9

To Qualifier 4
(Northwest Territories) Kerry Galusha	6
(Alberta) Holly Whyte	3
Qualifier 4
(Alberta) Cheryl Bernard	9
(Northwest Territories) Kerry Galusha	6

=== C Event ===
Third Knockout
(Alberta) Michelle Corbeil	2
(Alberta) Lisa Johnson	11

Quarterfinals
(Alberta) Sheri Pickering	3
(Saskatchewan) Jill Shumay	10
(Saskatchewan) Brandee Borne	4
(Alberta) Lisa Johnson	9

Semifinals
(Saskatchewan) Jill Shumay	8
(Alberta) Lisa Johnson	4

Qualifier 5
(Saskatchewan) Jill Shumay	7
(Alberta) Nadine Chyz	9

Third Knockout
(Alberta) Tanilla Doyle	9
(Alberta) Morgan Muise	8

Quarterfinals
(Saskatchewan) Chantelle Eberle	6
(Alberta) Jessie Kaufman	9
(Alberta) Tiffany Steuber	11
(Alberta) Tanilla Doyle	4

Semifinals
(Alberta) Casey Scheidegger	7
(Alberta) Jessie Kaufman	8
(Alberta) Renée Sonnenberg	6
(Alberta) Tiffany Steuber	8

Qualifier 6
(Alberta) Jessie Kaufman	8
(Alberta) Tiffany Steuber	0

Third Knockout
(Alberta) Karli Makichuk	2
(Alberta) Shana Snell	9

Quarterfinals
(Saskatchewan) Jolene Campbell	6
(Alberta) Shana Snell	8
(Alberta) Vanessa Pouliot	1
(Alberta) Delia DeJong	8

Semifinals
(Alberta) Crystal Webster	7
(Alberta) Shana Snell	5
(Alberta) Holly Whyte	9
(Alberta) Delia DeJong	10

Qualifier 7
(Alberta) Crystal Webster	9
(Alberta) Delia DeJong	6

Third Knockout
(Alberta) Alicia Wenger	2
(Alberta) Chana Martineau	9
(Alberta) Nola Zingel	4
(Alberta) Brenda Doroshuk	11

Quarterfinals
(Alberta) Lisa Eyamie	8
(Alberta) Chana Martineau	1
(Saskatchewan) Robyn Silvernagle	10
(Alberta) Brenda Doroshuk	5

Semifinals
(Alberta) Lisa Eyamie	3
(Saskatchewan) Robyn Silvernagle	6

Qualifier 8
(Saskatchewan) Robyn Silvernagle	4
(Northwest Territories) Kerry Galusha	7

== Playoffs ==
Quarterfinal
(Alberta) Valerie Sweeting	5
(Alberta) Jessie Kaufman	8
(Alberta) Cheryl Bernard	6
(Alberta) Nadine Chyz	8
(Alberta) Dana Ferguson	10
(Alberta) Crystal Webster	6
(Alberta) Tiffany Odegard	10
(Northwest Territories) Kerry Galusha	3

Semifinal
(Alberta) Jessie Kaufman	8
(Alberta) Nadine Chyz	6
(Alberta) Dana Ferguson	7
(Alberta) Tiffany Odegard	4

Final
(Alberta) Jessie Kaufman	9
(Alberta) Dana Ferguson	8
