= 2009 NWT/Yukon Scotties Tournament of Hearts =

Curling championship

The 2009 NWT/Yukon Scotties Tournament of Hearts (Canada's women's territorial curling championship) was held January 29 – February 1 at the Whitehorse Curling Club in Whitehorse, Yukon. The winning Kerry Galusha rink represented team Northwest Territories/Yukon at the 2009 Scotties Tournament of Hearts in Victoria, British Columbia.

== Teams ==
Skip	Third	Second	Lead	Club
Gloria Allen	Bridget Larocque	Kim Wainman	Evelyn Storr	Yellowknife Curling Club, Yellowknife
Kerry Galusha	Dawn Moses	Shawna Barbour	Heather McCagg	Yellowknife Curling Club, Yellowknife
Leslie Grant	Corinne Delaire	Tamar Vandenberghe	Doris Bouvier	Whitehorse Curling Club, Whitehorse
Helen Strong	Rhonda Horte	Sandra Mikkelsen	Jaime Hewitt*	Whitehorse Curling Club, Whitehorse

* Skips, but throws lead stones

== Final round-robin standings ==
Skip	W	L
Kerry Galusha	5	1
Jaime Hewitt	4	2
Leslie Grant	2	4
Gloria Allen	1	5

== Results ==
=== Draw 1 ===
January 29, 1400

Sheet 3	1	2	3	4	5	6	7	8	9	10	Final
Kerry Galusha	1	4	2	5	3	0	X	X	X	X	15
Gloria Allen	0	0	0	0	0	1	X	X	X	X	1

Sheet 4	1	2	3	4	5	6	7	8	9	10	Final
Jaime Hewitt	1	0	1	0	3	0	0	5	X	X	10
Leslie Grant	0	1	0	1	0	1	1	0	X	X	4

=== Draw 2 ===
January 30, 0930

Sheet 1	1	2	3	4	5	6	7	8	9	10	Final
Gloria Allen	0	1	1	0	1	0	1	0	X	X	4
Jaime Hewitt	2	0	0	2	0	2	0	5	X	X	11

Sheet 2	1	2	3	4	5	6	7	8	9	10	Final
Leslie Grant	0	0	3	0	0	1	4	1	0	1	10
Kerry Galusha	2	1	0	1	1	0	0	0	3	0	8

=== Draw 3 ===
January 30, 1400

Sheet 3	1	2	3	4	5	6	7	8	9	10	Final
Leslie Grant	1	1	0	1	0	0	1	0	0	X	4
Jaime Hewitt	0	0	2	0	2	0	0	1	1	X	6

Sheet 4	1	2	3	4	5	6	7	8	9	10	Final
Gloria Allen	0	0	0	0	0	0	X	X	X	X	0
Kerry Galusha	1	1	1	3	1	3	X	X	X	X	10

=== Draw 4 ===
January 31, 1300

Sheet 5	1	2	3	4	5	6	7	8	9	10	Final
Jaime Hewitt	0	0	2	1	0	0	1	0	0	X	4
Kerry Galusha	0	4	0	0	0	1	0	1	1	X	7

Sheet 6	1	2	3	4	5	6	7	8	9	10	Final
Gloria Allen	0	2	0	1	0	3	0	0	0	X	6
Leslie Grant	0	0	3	0	1	0	2	2	4	X	12

=== Draw 5 ===
January 31, 1800

Sheet 1	1	2	3	4	5	6	7	8	9	10	Final
Kerry Galusha	0	1	0	3	1	0	0	3	0	X	8
Leslie Grant	1	0	1	0	0	1	0	0	2	X	5

Sheet 2	1	2	3	4	5	6	7	8	9	10	Final
Jaime Hewitt	3	2	0	3	0	2	X	X	X	X	10
Gloria Allen	0	0	1	0	1	0	X	X	X	X	2

=== Draw 6 ===
February 1, 0900

Team	1	2	3	4	5	6	7	8	9	10	Final
Kerry Galusha	0	3	1	0	2	2	0	1	0	X	9
Jaime Hewitt	1	0	0	2	0	0	1	0	1	X	5

Team	1	2	3	4	5	6	7	8	9	10	Final
Leslie Grant	2	0	1	0	2	1	1	0	0	X	7
Gloria Allen	0	2	0	2	0	0	0	1	4	X	9
