= 2010 NWT/Yukon Scotties Tournament of Hearts =

The 2010 NWT/Yukon Scotties Tournament of Hearts was held January 7–10 at the Yellowknife Curling Club in Yellowknife, Northwest Territories. The winning team represented NWT/Yukon at the 2010 Scotties Tournament of Hearts in Sault Ste. Marie, Ontario.

== Teams ==
Skip	Third	Second	Lead	Curling Club
Sharon Cormier	Tara Naugler	Megan Cormier	Danielle Ellis	Yellowknife Curling Club, Yellowknife
Kerry Galusha	Dawn Moses	Shona Barbour	Kalie Dobson	Yellowknife Curling Club, Yellowknife
Leslie Grant	Corinne Delaire	Helen Strong	Tamar Vandenberghe	Whitehorse Curling Club, Whitehorse

== Standings ==
Skip	W	L
Galusha	3	3
Cormier	3	3
Grant	3	3

== Scores ==
- Galusha 7-6 Cormier
- Grant 6-5 Cormier
- Galusha 11-8 Grant
- Cormier 5-9 Galusha
- Cormier 8-5 Grant
- Grant 10-6 Galusha
- Cormier 14-8 Galusha
- Cormier 6-5 Grant
- Grant 6-5 Galusha

== Tie breakers ==
- Cormier 10-4 Galusha
- Cormier 8-5 Grant
