= Jill Officer =

Canadian curler

- Curler
- Born: June 2, 1975 (age 51); Winnipeg, Manitoba, Canada

Team
- Curling club: St. Vital CC, Winnipeg

Curling career
- Member Association: Manitoba
- Hearts: 13 (2005, 2006, 2007, 2008, 2009, 2010, 2011, 2012, 2013, 2015, 2016, 2018, 2019)
- World Championship: 7 (2005, 2008, 2009, 2010, 2015, 2018, 2019)
- Olympic: 1 (2014)
- Top CTRS ranking: 1st (2005-06, 2006-07, 2007-08, 2009-10, 2010-11, 2011-12, 2013-14, 2014-15, 2017–18)
- Grand Slam victories: 16 (2006 Players', 2007 Autumn Gold, 2007 Players', 2008 Wayden Transportation, 2009 Players', 2009 Autumn Gold, 2010 Sobeys Slam, 2011 Players', 2013 Manitoba Liquor & Lotteries, 2013 Colonial Square, 2014 Players', 2014 Autumn Gold, 2016 Champions Cup, 2017 Players', 2017 Masters, 2017 National)
Medal record
Women's curling
Representing Canada
Winter Olympics
Gold medal – first place	2014 Sochi
World Championships
Gold medal – first place	2008 Vernon
Gold medal – first place	2018 North Bay
Silver medal – second place	2015 Sapporo
Bronze medal – third place	2010 Swift Current
Representing Manitoba
Canadian Olympic Curling Trials
Gold medal – first place	2013 Winnipeg
Bronze medal – third place	2017 Ottawa
Scotties Tournament of Hearts
Gold medal – first place	2005 St. John's
Gold medal – first place	2008 Regina
Gold medal – first place	2009 Victoria
Gold medal – first place	2010 Sault Ste. Marie
Gold medal – first place	2015 Moose Jaw
Gold medal – first place	2018 Penticton
Silver medal – second place	2006 London
Silver medal – second place	2011 Charlottetown
Silver medal – second place	2013 Kingston
Bronze medal – third place	2007 Lethbridge
Bronze medal – third place	2012 Red Deer
Bronze medal – third place	2016 Grande Prairie

Jill Officer (born June 2, 1975) is a Canadian curler from Winnipeg, Manitoba. Officer played second for the teams skipped by Jennifer Jones from 2003 to 2018 and while they were juniors. The team won a gold medal while representing Canada at the 2014 Winter Olympics. Team Jones was the first women’s team to go through an Olympic campaign undefeated. The team has also won two World Curling Championships in 2008 and 2018, while going through the later event without a loss on their way to gold.

Officer has played on and off with Jones since she was 15. Together they won six national championships in 2005, 2008, 2009, 2010, 2015 and 2018. Officer's Scotties victories put her in an elite group of three to have won six titles. The group includes herself, Jennifer Jones, and Colleen Jones. She also won the Canadian Junior Curling Championships in 1994 together with Jones.

In 2019, Officer was named the greatest Canadian female second in history in a TSN poll of broadcasters, reporters and top curlers. She was also named the sixth greatest Canadian curler in history.

During the 2019–20 season, she coached the Tracy Fleury rink which included her niece Kristin MacCuish. She currently coaches the Beth Peterson rink.

== Early life and personal ==
Officer was born on June 2, 1975, in Winnipeg, Manitoba. Her father, John was a former hockey player and is now a coach. Her mother Leslie, was a sports enthusiast and was trying to get Officer involved in many areas of sports. Officer took figure skating lessons, played soccer, gymnastics, and baton twirling. When she was 10, her mother Leslie signed her up for curling in the Highlander Curling Club. "I was always hanging around a curling club or a hockey rink, so I was bound to take up one of those sports," Jill said in an interview with Active Life Magazine. Officer trekked to Mount Everest base camp in 2006.

Officer was a freelance writer and RBC Olympian, undertaking speaking engagements on behalf of Royal Bank of Canada. She also writes for The Curling News.

Officer was previously a reporter for the now defunct CKX TV station in Brandon, Manitoba. She currently resides in Winnipeg, Manitoba with her husband Devlin Hinchey, they have a daughter, Camryn. Officer studied Communications and Journalism/Broadcasting at Red River College Polytechnic. Her niece is curler Kristin MacCuish.

Officer currently works as the director of high performance for Curl Manitoba.

== Career ==
Officer was 15 years old when she was playing in the Highlander Curling Club in Winnipeg, Manitoba. After one game, she was pulled over by the Coke Machine by Jennifer Jones who had made it into the Canadian Finals, asking her to join the team. "I was a bit star-struck," Officer said.

Playing second for Jones, along with Trisha Baldwin at third and Dana Malanchuk at lead, the team got into the 1992 Manitoba's junior women's final before losing to Tracey Lavery. In 1993, Officer won her first title after winning the Manitoba Championships and went off to the 1993 Canadian Juniors. However, they missed the playoffs with an 8-4 record.

In 1994, they won the Manitoba Championships and went off to the Canadian Championships in Truro, Nova Scotia, with Officer at second. This time, they went for a 7–4 record and defeated Sherry Linton from Saskatchewan 8-5 in the finals. Ordinarily, winning the Canadian Juniors would mean a berth in the following year's World Junior Curling Championships, but a change in the ruling by the Canadian Curling Association (CCA) forced the team to play in a playoff the following year at the 1995 Canadian Juniors for the right to attend. Since Jones' team lost the 1995 Manitoba junior final to Kelly Mackenzie's team, the CCA gave them another chance to qualify by placing them directly in the semifinals of the Canadian Juniors. They played against Team MacKenzie and lost again.

In 2008, Officer, along with Jones, Cathy Overton-Clapham and Dawn McEwen won the 2008 Scotties Tournament of Hearts and went on to win the 2008 World Women's Curling Championship.

After a disappointing run at the 2009 Canadian Olympic Curling Trials, the Jones team won the 2010 Scotties Tournament of Hearts and a bronze medal at the 2010 World Women's Curling Championship. At the end of the season, the team replaced Cathy Overton-Clapham with Kaitlyn Lawes at third.

The Jones team won the 2013 Canadian Olympic Curling Trials, representing Canada at the 2014 Winter Olympic Games in Sochi and becoming the first women's team ever to go undefeated en route to their Olympic gold medal. The following season, the team won the 2015 Scotties Tournament of Hearts and a silver medal at the 2015 World Women's Curling Championship.

Officer and the Jones team attempted but failed to repeat as the Canadian Olympic team after losing in the semifinal of the 2017 Canadian Olympic Curling Trials. Officer joined Reid Carruthers in the 2018 Canadian Mixed Doubles Curling Olympic Trials, where they advanced to the playoffs but were eliminated. The Jones team won the 2018 Scotties Tournament of Hearts, Officer's record-tying sixth title, with Shannon Birchard replacing Lawes, who, with John Morris, represented Canada at the 2018 Winter Olympic Games in mixed doubles curling. At the 2018 World Women's Curling Championship, Officer, along with Jones, Lawes, McEwen, and Birchard as their alternate, went undefeated to win the title in Officer's last world championship, as she had announced that she would be stepping away from competitive curling.

After stepping away from competitive curling, Officer remained with the Jones team, serving as their alternate, and playing lead for the team with Jones, Lawes, and Shannon Birchard at the Grand Final of the inaugural Curling World Cup, which they won. She also served as the alternate for Team Carey at the 2019 World Women's Curling Championship. The following season, she spared for Team Tracy Fleury at the 2019 AMJ Campbell Shorty Jenkins Classic and the 2019 Curlers Corner Autumn Gold Curling Classic. At the Shorty Jenkins, they made it all the way to the final before losing to ironically, Jones. At the Autumn Gold, they made it to the semifinals. Officer was officially named the team's coach before the 2020 Manitoba Scotties Tournament of Hearts.

Officer was elected to the World Curling Federation Athletes Commission in 2018 and was elected to chair the commission in 2022. As Chair of the Athletes Commission, Officer also serves as a director of the WCF Executive Board for the duration of her term.

== Teams ==
Season	Skip	Third	Second	Lead
1992–93	Jennifer Jones	Trisha Baldwin	Jill Officer	Dana Malanchuk
1993–94	Jennifer Jones	Trisha Baldwin	Jill Officer	Dana Malanchuk
1998–99	Karen Porritt	Jennifer Jones	Patti Burtnyk	Jill Officer
2001–02	Linda Van Daele	Betty Couling	Jill Officer	Shawna Kaartinen
2002–03	Lois Fowler	Maureen Bonar	Jill Officer	Lana Hunter
2003–04	Jennifer Jones	Karen Porritt	Jill Officer	Lynn Fallis-Kurz
2004–05	Jennifer Jones	Cathy Overton-Clapham	Jill Officer	Cathy Gauthier
2005–06	Jennifer Jones	Cathy Overton-Clapham	Jill Officer	Georgina Wheatcroft
2006–07	Jennifer Jones	Cathy Overton-Clapham	Jill Officer	Dana Allerton / Janet Arnott / Dawn Askin
2007–08	Jennifer Jones	Cathy Overton-Clapham	Jill Officer	Dawn Askin
2008–09	Jennifer Jones	Cathy Overton-Clapham	Jill Officer	Dawn Askin
2009–10	Jennifer Jones	Cathy Overton-Clapham	Jill Officer	Dawn Askin
2010–11	Jennifer Jones	Kaitlyn Lawes	Jill Officer	Dawn Askin
2012	Jennifer Jones	Kaitlyn Lawes	Jill Officer	Dawn Askin
2012–13	Jennifer Jones	Kaitlyn Lawes	Jill Officer	Dawn Askin
2013–14	Jennifer Jones	Kaitlyn Lawes	Jill Officer	Dawn McEwen
2014–15	Jennifer Jones	Kaitlyn Lawes	Jill Officer	Dawn McEwen
2015–16	Jennifer Jones	Kaitlyn Lawes	Jill Officer	Jennifer Clark-Rouire / Dawn McEwen
2016–17	Jennifer Jones	Kaitlyn Lawes	Jill Officer	Dawn McEwen
2017–18	Jennifer Jones	Kaitlyn Lawes / Shannon Birchard (STOH)	Jill Officer	Dawn McEwen
