= 2012 NWT/Yukon Scotties Tournament of Hearts =

Canadian women's provincial curling championship

The 2012 NWT/Yukon Scotties Tournament of Hearts, the women's provincial curling championship for the Yukon and Northwest Territories, were originally scheduled for January 26 to 29 at the Yellowknife Curling Club in Yellowknife, Northwest Territories. However, due to no entries into the Yukon Ladies Championship, the Northwest Territories Ladies Championship, held January 13–15, at the Inuvik Curling Club, in Inuvik, was used to determine a representative for the Yukon/Northwest Territories. Kerry Galusha and her team from Yellowknife won the tiebreaker final, and the right to represent Yukon/Northwest Territories, at the 2012 Scotties Tournament of Hearts in Red Deer, Alberta, where Galusha would finish round robin with a 4-7 record.

== Teams ==
- Kerry Galusha (Yellowknife)
- Bridget Larocque (Inuvik)
- Maureen Miller (Yellowknife)
- Melba Mitchell (Inuvik)

== Standings ==
Skip (Club)	W	L
Kerry Galusha (Yellowknife)	6	1
Maureen Miller (Yellowknife)	5	2
Bridget Larocque (Inuvik)	1	5
Melba Mitchell (Inuvik)	1	5

== Results ==
=== Draw 1 ===
Team	Final
Maureen Miller	13
Melba Mitchell	3

Team	Final
Kerry Galusha	10
Bridget Larocque	1

=== Draw 2 ===
Team	Final
Maureen Miller	12
Bridget Larocque	5

Team	Final
Kerry Galusha	13
Melba Mitchell	5

=== Draw 3 ===
Team	Final
Maureen Miller	9
Kerry Galusha	1

Team	Final
Bridget Larocque	5
Melba Mitchell	10

=== Draw 4 ===
Team	Final
Kerry Galusha	9
Bridget Larocque	7

Team	Final
Maureen Miller	13
Melba Mitchell	1

=== Draw 5 ===
Team	Final
Maureen Miller	11
Bridget Larocque	1

Team	Final
Kerry Galusha	10
Melba Mitchell	1

=== Draw 6 ===
Team	Final
Kerry Galusha	12
Maureen Miller	1

Team	Final
Bridget Larocque	10
Melba Mitchell	6

=== Final ===
Team	Final
Kerry Galusha	10
Maureen Miller	5

2012 NWT/Yukon Scotties Tournament of Hearts

Kerry Galusha
NWT/Yukon Territorial Championship
