= 2012 Scotties Tournament of Hearts =

- Host city: Red Deer, Alberta
- Arena: ENMAX Centrium
- Dates: February 18–26
- Attendance: 94,997
- Winner: Alberta
- Curling club: Saville Sports Centre, Edmonton
- Skip: Heather Nedohin
- Third: Beth Iskiw
- Second: Jessica Mair
- Lead: Laine Peters
- Alternate: Amy Nixon
- Coach: Darryl Horne
- Finalist: British Columbia (Kelly Scott)

The 2012 Scotties Tournament of Hearts, the Canadian women's national curling championship, was held from Saturday, February 18 to Sunday, February 26 at the ENMAX Centrium in Red Deer, Alberta. This Tournament of Hearts marked the second time that Red Deer has hosted the Scotties; the first time that the Scotties was hosted in Red Deer was in 2004.

The winning team, Heather Nedohin of Alberta, went on to represent Canada at the 2012 Ford World Women's Curling Championship in Lethbridge, Alberta. Nedohin won the final after she defeated British Columbia's Kelly Scott with a score of 7–6. Nedohin's championship win was the seventh win by the home team of the host province and the first championship win for Alberta in fourteen years.

== Teams ==
The defending champions, skipped by Amber Holland, returned to their third Scotties in a row, for the first time wearing the red and white for Canada. They were looking to build momentum off of last year's success, when they won their first Canadian Women's Championship. The last time a team from Saskatchewan won back to back championships was in 1994 when Team Canada's Sandra Peterson (Schmirler) defeated Manitoba's Connie Laliberte to win her second National Title.

The road to a second national title was not going to be an easy one for the defending champions, as this year's field proved to be a difficult one. For the seventh time, in eight years Kerry Galusha represented the Northwest Territories/Yukon. Galusha has added Sharon Cormier to her team, and together the team had found early success on the World Curling Tour, defeating several top teams, and qualifying for an event. Making her 10th Scotties appearance, Heather Strong represented Newfoundland and Labrador. Strong's last appearance was in 2009, when her team went 5-6. Strong has never advanced beyond a tiebreaker and was looking for a spot in the playoffs.

Manitoba's spot to the Scotties was hotly contested and had several top teams vying for the provincial title. Jennifer Jones won the provincial final over Chelsea Carey. Jones, who made her 9th appearance at the Scotties, was looking for her 5th national title, but fell short. British Columbia's provincial playoffs saw four past provincial champions looking to win a place at the Scotties. Kelly Scott defeated Marla Mallett in the final to win the provincial championship. Scott missed out on the playoffs last year. Kim Dolan represented Prince Edward Island. This was Dolan's first provincial win in 13 years, and also marked her 12th and final Scotties appearance. Nova Scotia was represented by Heather Smith-Dacey, who finished third at last year's Scotties, but failed to make the playoffs at this event.

Michelle Englot represented Saskatchewan making her 8th appearance. Her last trip to the Scotties was in 2008 and was a difficult one, having lost her father the day before the event began. This time around was a much better time for Englot. Marie-France Larouche represented Quebec for the second year in a row, making her 7th Scotties appearance with a new team. Andrea Kelly of New Brunswick made her 5th appearance at the Scotties with a new lineup. Kelly recently promoted her third, Rebecca Atkinson, to skip, and Kelly continued to throw fourth stones.

Ontario was represented by the team skipped by Tracy Horgan, who made her first Scotties appearance after stealing the win over Rachel Homan in the Ontario provincial final. Heather Nedohin represented Alberta, marking the first time in twelve years that Nedohin has been to a Scotties. Nedohin is a former Scotties champion under skip Cathy King.

Canada	Alberta	British Columbia
Kronau CC, Kronau Skip: Amber Holland; Third: Kim Schneider; Second: Tammy Schneider (Note: Team Canada second Tammy Schneider left after the second end of Draw 8 due to a leg injury and after the second end of Draw 12 due to illness. Alternate Jolene Campbell threw second stones for the final seven ends of Draw 8 and all of Draw 10 while Schneider was injured plus the final nine ends of Draw 12 and the team's final three draws while Schneider was ill.); Lead: Heather Kalenchuk; Alternate: Jolene Campbell	Saville SC, Edmonton Skip: Heather Nedohin; Third: Beth Iskiw; Second: Jessica Mair; Lead: Laine Peters (Note: Team Alberta alternate Amy Nixon threw lead stones in the last end of Draw 6.); Alternate: Amy Nixon	Kelowna CC, Kelowna Skip: Kelly Scott; Third: Sasha Carter (Note: Team British Columbia third Sasha Carter battled a bout with the flu and missed Draws 6, 8, 12 and 13. For the first two draws Carter missed, alternate Sherry Fraser threw second stones while second Dailene Sivertson threw third stones. Fraser and Sivertson swapped positions the last two draws Carter missed.); Second: Dailene Sivertson; Lead: Jacquie Armstrong; Alternate: Sherry Fraser
Manitoba	New Brunswick	Newfoundland and Labrador
St. Vital CC, Winnipeg Skip: Jennifer Jones; Third: Kaitlyn Lawes; Second: Jill Officer; Lead: Dawn Askin (Note: Team Manitoba alternate Jennifer Clark-Rouire threw lead stones in the final end of both Draws 2 and 9.); Alternate: Jennifer Clark-Rouire	Gage G&CC, Oromocto Fourth: Andrea Kelly; Skip: Rebecca Atkinson; Second: Jillian Babin (Note: Team New Brunswick alternate Jeanette Murphy threw second stones in the last end of Draw 2.); Lead: Jodie deSolla (Note: Team New Brunswick alternate Jeanette Murphy threw lead stones for the final seven ends of Draw 10 and the remainder of the tournament after lead Jodie deSolla pulled a muscle in the second end of Draw 10 and was unable to play the rest of the tournament.); Alternate: Jeanette Murphy	Bally Haly G&CC, St. John's Skip: Heather Strong; Third: Laura Strong; Second: Jenn Cunningham; Lead: Stephanie Korab; Alternate: Noelle Thomas-Kennell
Nova Scotia	Ontario	Prince Edward Island
CFB Halifax CC, Halifax Skip: Heather Smith-Dacey; Third: Danielle Parsons; Second: Blisse Comstock; Lead: Teri Lake; Alternate: Melanie Comstock	Idylwylde G&CC, Sudbury Skip: Tracy Horgan; Third: Jennifer Seabrook; Second: Jenna Enge; Lead: Amanda Gates (Note: Team Ontario alternate Jen Gates threw lead stones in the last end of Draw 11.); Alternate: Jen Gates	Charlottetown CC, Charlottetown Skip: Kim Dolan; Third: Rebecca Jean MacDonald; Second: Sinead Dolan; Lead: Nancy Cameron (Note: Team Prince Edward Island used a lead rotation.); Alternate: Michala Robison
Quebec	Saskatchewan	Northwest Territories/Yukon
CC Etchemin, Saint-Romuald Skip: Marie-France Larouche; Third: Brenda Nicholls; Second: Amélie Blais (Note: Team Quebec alternate Julie Rainville threw second stones in the last end of Draw 16.); Lead: Anne-Marie Filteau; Alternate: Julie Rainville	Tartan CC, Regina Skip: Michelle Englot; Third: Lana Vey; Second: Roberta Materi; Lead: Sarah Slywka; Alternate: Candace Chisholm	Yellowknife CC, Yellowknife Skip: Kerry Galusha (Note: For Draw 9, Team Northwest Territories/Yukon played with three players as both skip Kerry Galusha and alternate Wendy Miller fell ill and were unable to play. Third Sharon Cormier would assume skip duties in Galusha's absence (Galusha would also be out for Draw 11) while Miller would return for Draw 11.) (Note: With Galusha still out due to illness for Draw 11, third Sharon Cormier threw skip stones with second Shona Barbour throwing third stones while alternate Wendy Miller threw second stones.); Third: Sharon Cormier; Second: Shona Barbour (Note: Team Northwest Territories/Yukon used a front-end rotation.) (Note: For the first five ends of Draw 2, Team Northwest Territories/Yukon alternate Wendy Miller threw second stones with second Shona Barbour threw lead stones and lead Megan Cormier sitting out. Cormier replaced Miller after the fifth end and threw lead stones with Barbour throwing second stones.); Lead: Megan Cormier; Alternate: Wendy Miller

== Map of teams ==
Team Canada Provincial Winners

== Round robin standings ==
Final Round Robin standings

Key
Teams to Playoffs

Locale	Skip	W	L	W–L	PF	PA	EW	EL	BE	SE	S%
Manitoba	Jennifer Jones	9	2	–	77	56	50	39	16	15	85%
British Columbia	Kelly Scott	8	3	–	87	74	54	46	8	12	79%
Quebec	Marie-France Larouche	7	4	1–0	71	67	51	46	11	13	79%
Alberta	Heather Nedohin	7	4	0–1	81	64	52	45	10	12	83%
Canada	Amber Holland	6	5	–	71	65	43	49	13	10	81%
Saskatchewan	Michelle Englot	5	6	1–0	89	78	50	50	5	14	80%
New Brunswick	Rebecca Atkinson	5	6	0–1	70	78	43	50	11	5	78%
Ontario	Tracy Horgan	4	7	3–0	69	69	44	46	10	13	78%
Newfoundland and Labrador	Heather Strong	4	7	2–1	70	76	43	49	10	10	80%
Northwest Territories/Yukon	Kerry Galusha	4	7	1–2	61	85	45	49	4	12	74%
Nova Scotia	Heather Smith-Dacey	4	7	0–3	63	84	45	45	12	12	76%
Prince Edward Island	Kim Dolan	3	8	–	73	80	46	49	14	10	76%

== Round Robin results ==
All draw times listed in Mountain Time (UTC-7:00).

=== Draw 1 ===
Saturday, February 18, 1:00 pm

Sheet A	1	2	3	4	5	6	7	8	9	10	11	Final
Ontario (Horgan)	1	0	2	0	1	0	0	0	0	2	1	7
Prince Edward Island (Dolan) 🔨	0	2	0	2	0	1	0	0	1	0	0	6

Sheet B	1	2	3	4	5	6	7	8	9	10	11	Final
Quebec (Larouche)	0	0	0	1	0	2	0	2	0	1	0	6
British Columbia (Scott) 🔨	1	0	0	0	2	0	2	0	1	0	1	7

Sheet C	1	2	3	4	5	6	7	8	9	10	11	Final
Alberta (Nedohin) 🔨	2	0	2	1	0	0	0	1	0	1	0	7
Northwest Territories/Yukon (Galusha)	0	3	0	0	2	1	0	0	1	0	1	8

Sheet D	1	2	3	4	5	6	7	8	9	10	Final
Newfoundland and Labrador (Strong) 🔨	0	1	0	1	0	1	0	0	1	X	4
Canada (Holland)	0	0	2	0	1	0	1	3	0	X	7

=== Draw 2 ===
Saturday, February 18, 6:00 pm

Sheet A	1	2	3	4	5	6	7	8	9	10	Final
Newfoundland and Labrador (Strong)	0	0	2	0	1	0	0	0	2	0	5
Quebec (Larouche) 🔨	1	0	0	0	0	1	1	2	0	2	7

Sheet B	1	2	3	4	5	6	7	8	9	10	Final
Saskatchewan (Englot)	0	1	0	0	1	0	2	1	1	1	7
Nova Scotia (Smith-Dacey) 🔨	0	0	0	3	0	2	0	0	0	0	5

Sheet C	1	2	3	4	5	6	7	8	9	10	Final
Manitoba (Jones)	1	0	1	0	0	2	0	1	2	X	7
New Brunswick (Atkinson) 🔨	0	0	0	1	0	0	2	0	0	X	3

Sheet D	1	2	3	4	5	6	7	8	9	10	Final
Northwest Territories/Yukon (Galusha)	0	0	2	0	2	0	0	0	1	X	5
Prince Edward Island (Dolan) 🔨	0	6	0	1	0	0	1	1	0	X	9

=== Draw 3 ===
Sunday, February 19, 8:30 am

Sheet A	1	2	3	4	5	6	7	8	9	10	Final
Nova Scotia (Smith-Dacey)	0	1	2	0	2	0	0	0	X	X	5
Northwest Territories/Yukon (Galusha) 🔨	2	0	0	2	0	3	1	2	X	X	10

Sheet B	1	2	3	4	5	6	7	8	9	10	Final
Prince Edward Island (Dolan) 🔨	2	0	3	0	0	0	1	0	1	1	8
Manitoba (Jones)	0	2	0	3	1	1	0	2	0	0	9

Sheet C	1	2	3	4	5	6	7	8	9	10	Final
Saskatchewan (Englot)	0	2	0	1	1	1	0	0	4	1	10
Newfoundland and Labrador (Strong) 🔨	3	0	2	0	0	0	1	1	0	0	7

Sheet D	1	2	3	4	5	6	7	8	9	10	Final
New Brunswick (Atkinson) 🔨	0	2	0	0	2	0	1	0	3	0	8
Quebec (Larouche)	1	0	1	1	0	2	0	1	0	1	7

=== Draw 4 ===
Sunday, February 19, 1:30 pm

Sheet A	1	2	3	4	5	6	7	8	9	10	Final
British Columbia (Scott)	0	2	0	2	0	1	0	2	0	3	10
Saskatchewan (Englot) 🔨	2	0	1	0	2	0	2	0	1	0	8

Sheet B	1	2	3	4	5	6	7	8	9	10	Final
Canada (Holland)	2	0	2	0	0	0	1	0	0	1	6
New Brunswick (Atkinson) 🔨	0	1	0	0	1	1	0	1	1	0	5

Sheet C	1	2	3	4	5	6	7	8	9	10	Final
Ontario (Horgan)	1	0	3	0	4	1	1	X	X	X	10
Nova Scotia (Smith-Dacey) 🔨	0	2	0	1	0	0	0	X	X	X	3

Sheet D	1	2	3	4	5	6	7	8	9	10	Final
Manitoba (Jones) 🔨	0	1	0	1	0	0	2	0	2	0	6
Alberta (Nedohin)	0	0	3	0	0	2	0	2	0	1	8

=== Draw 5 ===
Sunday, February 19, 6:30 pm

Sheet A	1	2	3	4	5	6	7	8	9	10	Final
Canada (Holland) 🔨	0	1	0	2	0	1	0	0	0	2	6
Alberta (Nedohin)	0	0	1	0	1	0	1	1	1	0	5

Sheet B	1	2	3	4	5	6	7	8	9	10	Final
Northwest Territories/Yukon (Galusha)	0	1	0	0	1	0	0	1	X	X	3
Newfoundland and Labrador (Strong) 🔨	2	0	2	2	0	1	1	0	X	X	8

Sheet C	1	2	3	4	5	6	7	8	9	10	Final
Prince Edward Island (Dolan)	0	0	0	0	2	0	1	0	1	0	4
Quebec (Larouche) 🔨	0	1	1	0	0	0	0	2	0	1	5

Sheet D	1	2	3	4	5	6	7	8	9	10	Final
British Columbia (Scott)	0	3	1	0	1	0	1	0	0	3	9
Ontario (Horgan) 🔨	1	0	0	3	0	1	0	2	1	0	8

=== Draw 6 ===
Monday, February 20, 8:30 am

Sheet B	1	2	3	4	5	6	7	8	9	10	Final
Ontario (Horgan)	0	1	0	0	2	0	0	0	1	X	4
Alberta (Nedohin) 🔨	1	0	1	2	0	1	1	2	0	X	8

Sheet C	1	2	3	4	5	6	7	8	9	10	Final
British Columbia (Scott)	0	2	0	2	0	1	0	1	0	1	7
Canada (Holland) 🔨	0	0	1	0	3	0	1	0	0	0	5

=== Draw 7 ===
Monday, February 20, 1:30 pm

Sheet A	1	2	3	4	5	6	7	8	9	10	Final
Northwest Territories/Yukon (Galusha)	0	1	0	1	0	1	1	0	2	0	6
New Brunswick (Atkinson) 🔨	1	0	2	0	1	0	0	3	0	1	8

Sheet B	1	2	3	4	5	6	7	8	9	10	Final
Nova Scotia (Smith-Dacey)	1	0	2	1	0	1	0	2	3	X	10
Quebec (Larouche) 🔨	0	2	0	0	1	0	1	0	0	X	4

Sheet C	1	2	3	4	5	6	7	8	9	10	Final
Newfoundland and Labrador (Strong)	0	2	0	1	0	0	1	1	0	X	5
Manitoba (Jones) 🔨	2	0	3	0	0	1	0	0	2	X	8

Sheet D	1	2	3	4	5	6	7	8	9	10	Final
Prince Edward Island (Dolan) 🔨	0	1	0	1	0	2	0	1	2	1	8
Saskatchewan (Englot)	0	0	2	0	1	0	4	0	0	0	7

=== Draw 8 ===
Monday, February 20, 7:30 pm

Sheet A	1	2	3	4	5	6	7	8	9	10	Final
Nova Scotia (Smith-Dacey) 🔨	2	1	0	1	0	0	2	0	0	2	8
British Columbia (Scott)	0	0	3	0	2	0	0	2	0	0	7

Sheet B	1	2	3	4	5	6	7	8	9	10	Final
Manitoba (Jones) 🔨	1	0	0	0	0	0	0	2	0	X	3
Canada (Holland)	0	0	0	0	1	2	1	0	3	X	7

Sheet C	1	2	3	4	5	6	7	8	9	10	Final
Saskatchewan (Englot) 🔨	2	1	0	2	0	2	3	X	X	X	10
Ontario (Horgan)	0	0	1	0	2	0	0	X	X	X	3

Sheet D	1	2	3	4	5	6	7	8	9	10	Final
Alberta (Nedohin)	0	1	0	2	0	1	0	0	1	0	5
New Brunswick (Atkinson) 🔨	1	0	1	0	3	0	1	1	0	1	8

=== Draw 9 ===
Tuesday, February 21, 8:30 am

Sheet A	1	2	3	4	5	6	7	8	9	10	Final
Prince Edward Island (Dolan)	1	1	0	0	1	0	1	0	0	0	4
Newfoundland and Labrador (Strong) 🔨	0	0	2	2	0	2	0	0	1	1	8

Sheet B	1	2	3	4	5	6	7	8	9	10	Final
New Brunswick (Atkinson) 🔨	2	0	2	0	1	0	1	0	X	X	6
Saskatchewan (Englot)	0	2	0	2	0	3	0	4	X	X	11

Sheet C	1	2	3	4	5	6	7	8	9	10	Final
Northwest Territories/Yukon (Galusha) 🔨	1	0	1	0	1	0	2	0	0	X	5
Quebec (Larouche)	0	2	0	1	0	1	0	1	2	X	7

Sheet D	1	2	3	4	5	6	7	8	9	10	Final
Nova Scotia (Smith-Dacey) 🔨	1	0	0	0	0	1	0	1	0	X	3
Manitoba (Jones)	0	0	0	3	0	0	3	0	2	X	8

=== Draw 10 ===
Tuesday, February 21, 1:30 pm

Sheet A	1	2	3	4	5	6	7	8	9	10	11	Final
Saskatchewan (Englot)	0	2	0	1	1	0	0	1	0	2	0	7
Manitoba (Jones) 🔨	2	0	1	0	0	2	1	0	1	0	1	8

Sheet B	1	2	3	4	5	6	7	8	9	10	Final
Alberta (Nedohin) 🔨	1	1	0	1	0	1	0	2	0	1	7
British Columbia (Scott)	0	0	1	0	1	0	1	0	1	0	4

Sheet C	1	2	3	4	5	6	7	8	9	10	Final
Nova Scotia (Smith-Dacey)	0	0	0	2	0	1	0	1	0	X	4
New Brunswick (Atkinson) 🔨	0	2	0	0	3	0	0	0	3	X	8

Sheet D	1	2	3	4	5	6	7	8	9	10	Final
Ontario (Horgan) 🔨	1	0	0	0	2	0	0	1	0	X	4
Canada (Holland)	0	1	0	1	0	2	4	0	1	X	9

=== Draw 11 ===
Tuesday, February 21, 7:30 pm

Sheet A	1	2	3	4	5	6	7	8	9	10	11	Final
Quebec (Larouche)	0	0	0	1	0	0	1	0	2	1	3	8
Canada (Holland) 🔨	0	1	1	0	2	0	0	1	0	0	0	5

Sheet B	1	2	3	4	5	6	7	8	9	10	Final
Northwest Territories/Yukon (Galusha)	0	1	0	1	0	0	0	0	X	X	2
Ontario (Horgan) 🔨	1	0	2	0	2	1	1	5	X	X	12

Sheet C	1	2	3	4	5	6	7	8	9	10	Final
Prince Edward Island (Dolan)	0	1	0	3	0	0	0	1	0	X	5
Alberta (Nedohin) 🔨	2	0	2	0	0	0	2	0	4	X	10

Sheet D	1	2	3	4	5	6	7	8	9	10	Final
British Columbia (Scott)	0	1	2	2	0	1	1	0	4	X	11
Newfoundland and Labrador (Strong) 🔨	3	0	0	0	3	0	0	1	0	X	7

=== Draw 12 ===
Wednesday, February 22, 8:30 am

Sheet A	1	2	3	4	5	6	7	8	9	10	Final
New Brunswick (Atkinson)	0	0	2	0	2	0	0	1	0	1	6
Ontario (Horgan) 🔨	0	2	0	1	0	0	1	0	1	0	5

Sheet B	1	2	3	4	5	6	7	8	9	10	11	Final
Canada (Holland) 🔨	1	0	0	0	1	0	0	2	0	2	0	6
Nova Scotia (Smith-Dacey)	0	2	0	1	0	1	1	0	1	0	1	7

Sheet C	1	2	3	4	5	6	7	8	9	10	11	Final
Manitoba (Jones) 🔨	1	0	1	0	2	0	1	0	0	1	2	8
British Columbia (Scott)	0	1	0	2	0	2	0	1	0	0	0	6

Sheet D	1	2	3	4	5	6	7	8	9	10	Final
Saskatchewan (Englot)	2	0	0	0	1	0	2	0	2	1	8
Alberta (Nedohin) 🔨	0	1	0	2	0	2	0	4	0	0	9

=== Draw 13 ===
Wednesday, February 22, 1:30 pm

Sheet A	1	2	3	4	5	6	7	8	9	10	Final
British Columbia (Scott)	0	1	1	0	3	1	1	0	3	X	10
Northwest Territories/Yukon (Galusha) 🔨	2	0	0	3	0	0	0	1	0	X	6

Sheet B	1	2	3	4	5	6	7	8	9	10	Final
Quebec (Larouche)	1	1	1	0	0	0	0	1	0	2	6
Alberta (Nedohin) 🔨	0	0	0	2	1	1	0	0	1	0	5

Sheet C	1	2	3	4	5	6	7	8	9	10	Final
Ontario (Horgan)	0	2	1	0	2	1	0	1	0	0	7
Newfoundland and Labrador (Strong) 🔨	1	0	0	0	0	0	2	0	1	0	4

Sheet D	1	2	3	4	5	6	7	8	9	10	Final
Canada (Holland) 🔨	3	1	2	0	3	0	1	0	X	X	10
Prince Edward Island (Dolan)	0	0	0	2	0	1	0	1	X	X	4

=== Draw 14 ===
Wednesday, February 22, 7:30 pm

Sheet A	1	2	3	4	5	6	7	8	9	10	11	Final
Prince Edward Island (Dolan) 🔨	0	0	2	0	1	0	1	0	1	1	0	6
Nova Scotia (Smith-Dacey)	1	1	0	1	0	1	0	2	0	0	1	7

Sheet B	1	2	3	4	5	6	7	8	9	10	Final
Newfoundland and Labrador (Strong) 🔨	2	0	1	3	0	2	0	0	1	X	9
New Brunswick (Atkinson)	0	0	0	0	1	0	2	1	0	X	4

Sheet C	1	2	3	4	5	6	7	8	9	10	Final
Quebec (Larouche) 🔨	2	0	1	0	2	0	3	0	2	X	10
Saskatchewan (Englot)	0	1	0	1	0	2	0	2	0	X	6

Sheet D	1	2	3	4	5	6	7	8	9	10	Final
Manitoba (Jones)	0	2	3	1	1	0	1	X	X	X	8
Northwest Territories/Yukon (Galusha) 🔨	1	0	0	0	0	1	0	X	X	X	2

=== Draw 15 ===
Thursday, February 23, 8:30 am

Sheet A	1	2	3	4	5	6	7	8	9	10	Final
Alberta (Nedohin) 🔨	2	1	0	0	2	1	0	4	X	X	10
Newfoundland and Labrador (Strong)	0	0	0	1	0	0	2	0	X	X	3

Sheet B	1	2	3	4	5	6	7	8	9	10	Final
British Columbia (Scott) 🔨	0	1	0	2	2	1	0	1	0	1	8
Prince Edward Island (Dolan)	1	0	1	0	0	0	1	0	2	0	5

Sheet C	1	2	3	4	5	6	7	8	9	10	Final
Canada (Holland)	0	2	0	0	0	2	1	0	0	0	5
Northwest Territories/Yukon (Galusha) 🔨	1	0	1	1	1	0	0	0	1	2	7

Sheet D	1	2	3	4	5	6	7	8	9	10	Final
Quebec (Larouche) 🔨	2	0	1	1	0	0	1	1	0	1	7
Ontario (Horgan)	0	2	0	0	0	1	0	0	2	0	5

=== Draw 16 ===
Thursday, February 23, 1:30 pm

Sheet A	1	2	3	4	5	6	7	8	9	10	Final
Manitoba (Jones) 🔨	1	1	0	2	1	1	0	1	0	X	7
Quebec (Larouche)	0	0	2	0	0	0	1	0	1	X	4

Sheet B	1	2	3	4	5	6	7	8	9	10	Final
Saskatchewan (Englot) 🔨	2	0	2	0	0	0	0	0	0	X	4
Northwest Territories/Yukon (Galusha)	0	1	0	1	1	1	1	1	1	X	7

Sheet C	1	2	3	4	5	6	7	8	9	10	Final
New Brunswick (Atkinson) 🔨	0	2	0	1	0	0	0	1	0	X	4
Prince Edward Island (Dolan)	0	0	2	0	1	2	1	0	5	X	11

Sheet D	1	2	3	4	5	6	7	8	9	10	Final
Newfoundland and Labrador (Strong) 🔨	0	2	0	3	2	0	0	2	1	X	10
Nova Scotia (Smith-Dacey)	2	0	1	0	0	1	1	0	0	X	5

=== Draw 17 ===
Thursday, February 23, 7:30 pm

Sheet A	1	2	3	4	5	6	7	8	9	10	Final
Canada (Holland) 🔨	1	0	1	0	0	0	0	3	0	X	5
Saskatchewan (Englot)	0	1	0	2	1	0	3	0	4	X	11

Sheet B	1	2	3	4	5	6	7	8	9	10	Final
Ontario (Horgan) 🔨	1	1	0	0	0	1	0	0	0	X	3
Manitoba (Jones)	0	0	1	0	1	0	2	0	1	X	5

Sheet C	1	2	3	4	5	6	7	8	9	10	Final
Alberta (Nedohin)	0	2	0	0	2	0	2	1	0	0	7
Nova Scotia (Smith-Dacey) 🔨	1	0	0	1	0	2	0	0	1	1	6

Sheet D	1	2	3	4	5	6	7	8	9	10	Final
New Brunswick (Atkinson) 🔨	0	2	0	2	0	1	0	1	0	0	6
British Columbia (Scott)	1	0	2	0	0	0	1	0	2	1	7

== Playoffs ==
Page playoff system
1	Manitoba	5
2	British Columbia	7
3	Quebec	4
4	Alberta	7

Semifinal
1	Manitoba	5
4	Alberta	6

Final
2	British Columbia	6
4	Alberta	7
Bronze Medal Game
3	Quebec	6
1	Manitoba	8

=== 1 vs. 2 ===
Friday, February 24, 7:30 pm

Sheet B	1	2	3	4	5	6	7	8	9	10	Final
Manitoba (Jones) 🔨	1	0	1	0	0	1	1	0	1	0	5
British Columbia (Scott)	0	1	0	2	2	0	0	1	0	1	7

Player percentages
Manitoba		British Columbia	
Dawn Askin	90%	Jacquie Armstrong	80%
Jill Officer	65%	Dailene Sivertson	80%
Kaitlyn Lawes	69%	Sasha Carter	88%
Jennifer Jones	81%	Kelly Scott	86%
Total	76%	Total	83%

=== 3 vs. 4 ===
Saturday, February 25, 11:00 am

Sheet B	1	2	3	4	5	6	7	8	9	10	Final
Quebec (Larouche) 🔨	1	0	0	1	0	1	0	1	0	0	4
Alberta (Nedohin)	0	0	2	0	2	0	0	0	2	1	7

Player percentages
Quebec		Alberta	
Anne-Marie Filteau	78%	Laine Peters	78%
Amélie Blais	75%	Jessica Mair	91%
Brenda Nicholls	81%	Beth Iskiw	83%
Marie-France Larouche	70%	Heather Nedohin	87%
Total	76%	Total	85%

=== Semifinal ===
Saturday, February 25, 4:00 pm

Sheet B	1	2	3	4	5	6	7	8	9	10	11	Final
Manitoba (Jones) 🔨	1	0	0	2	0	0	1	0	0	1	0	5
Alberta (Nedohin)	0	0	1	0	3	0	0	1	0	0	1	6

Player percentages
Manitoba		Alberta	
Dawn Askin	90%	Laine Peters	92%
Jill Officer	85%	Jessica Mair	78%
Kaitlyn Lawes	72%	Beth Iskiw	86%
Jennifer Jones	74%	Heather Nedohin	90%
Total	80%	Total	87%

=== Bronze-medal game ===
Sunday, February 26, 8:30 am

Sheet B	1	2	3	4	5	6	7	8	9	10	Final
Quebec (Larouche)	0	2	1	1	0	1	0	1	0	0	6
Manitoba (Jones) 🔨	2	0	0	0	1	0	4	0	0	1	8

Player Percentages
Quebec		Manitoba	
Anne-Marie Filteau	90%	Jennifer Clark-Rouire (Note: For the first two ends, alternate Jennifer Clark-Rouire threw lead stones, lead Dawn Askin threw second stones while second Jill Officer sat out. After the second end, Askin returned to throwing lead stones with Officer entering the game throwing second stones while Clark-Rouire sat out.)	94%
–		Dawn Askin	94%
Amélie Blais	85%	Jill Officer	92%
Brenda Nicholls	84%	Kaitlyn Lawes	95%
Marie-France Larouche	83%	Jennifer Jones	84%
Total	87%	Total	91%

=== Final ===
Sunday, February 26, 1:30 pm

Sheet B	1	2	3	4	5	6	7	8	9	10	Final
British Columbia (Scott) 🔨	1	0	0	0	2	0	1	0	1	1	6
Alberta (Nedohin)	0	1	1	1	0	3	0	1	0	0	7

Player percentages
British Columbia		Alberta	
Jacquie Armstrong	83%	Laine Peters	85%
Dailene Sivertson	81%	Jessica Mair	88%
Sasha Carter	69%	Beth Iskiw	93%
Kelly Scott	78%	Heather Nedohin	83%
Total	78%	Total	87%

== Statistics ==
=== Top 5 Player Percentages ===
Round Robin only; minimum 6 games

Key
First All-Star Team
Second All-Star Team

Leads	%
(Manitoba) Dawn Askin	89
(Alberta) Laine Peters	87
(Saskatchewan) Sarah Slywka	86
(Newfoundland and Labrador) Stephanie Korab	85
(Canada) Heather Kalenchuk	84
(British Columbia) Jacquie Armstrong	84
(Quebec) Anne-Marie Filteau	84

Seconds	%
(Canada) Jolene Campbell	87
(Manitoba) Jill Officer	83
(Alberta) Jessica Mair	83
(Ontario) Jenna Enge	81
(New Brunswick) Jillian Babin	79

Thirds	%
(Manitoba) Kaitlyn Lawes	85
(Alberta) Beth Iskiw	84
(British Columbia) Sasha Carter	84
(Saskatchewan) Lana Vey	82
(Quebec) Brenda Nicholls	81

Skips	%
(Manitoba) Jennifer Jones	83
(British Columbia) Kelly Scott	79
(Canada) Amber Holland	78
(Alberta) Heather Nedohin	78
(New Brunswick) Andrea Kelly (Fourth)	78

=== Perfect games ===
Round robin only; minimum 10 shots thrown

Player	Team	Position	Shots	Opponent
Heather Kalenchuk	Canada	Lead	18	Saskatchewan

== Awards ==
The awards and all-star teams are as follows:

Sandra Schmirler Most Valuable Player Award

- Heather Nedohin, Alberta

Shot of the Week Award

- Sasha Carter, British Columbia

Marj Mitchell Sportsmanship Award

- Amanda Gates, Ontario

All-Star Teams

First Team

- Skip: Jennifer Jones, Manitoba
- Third: Kaitlyn Lawes, Manitoba
- Second: Jill Officer, Manitoba
- Lead: Dawn Askin, Manitoba

Second Team

- Skip: Kelly Scott, British Columbia
- Third: Beth Iskiw, Alberta
- Second: Jessica Mair, Alberta
- Lead: Laine Peters, Alberta

== Provincial and territorial playdowns ==
- 2012 Alberta Scotties Tournament of Hearts
- 2012 British Columbia Scotties Tournament of Hearts
- 2012 Manitoba Scotties Tournament of Hearts
- 2012 New Brunswick Scotties Tournament of Hearts
- 2012 Newfoundland and Labrador Scotties Tournament of Hearts
- 2012 Nova Scotia Scotties Tournament of Hearts
- 2012 Ontario Scotties Tournament of Hearts
- 2012 Prince Edward Island Scotties Tournament of Hearts
- 2012 Quebec Scotties Tournament of Hearts
- 2012 Saskatchewan Scotties Tournament of Hearts
- (Northwest Territories) 2012 NWT/Yukon Scotties Tournament of Hearts
