= Megan Koehler =

Canadian curler (born 1989)

- Curler
- Born: Megan Cormier; July 18, 1989 (age 37); Yellowknife, Northwest Territories, Canada

Team
- Curling club: Yellowknife CC, Yellowknife, NT
- Skip: Nicky Kaufman
- Third: Megan Koehler
- Second: Sydney Galusha
- Lead: Ella Skauge
- Alternate: Brynn Chorostowski

Curling career
- Member Association: Northwest Territories
- Hearts: 11 (2010, 2012, 2013, 2015, 2016, 2017, 2018, 2022, 2023, 2025, 2026)
- Top CTRS ranking: 40th (2011–12)

Megan Koehler (born July 18, 1989, in Yellowknife, Northwest Territories as Megan Cormier) is a Canadian curler. from Cochrane, Alberta. She currently plays third on Team Nicky Kaufman.

== Career ==
=== Juniors ===
Koehler made her National curling debut at the 2007 Canadian Junior Curling Championships. She skipped her own team, representing the Northwest Territories. Koehler and team would have a very difficult time at the event, failing to win a single game, finishing round robin with a 0–12 record. This would be Koehler's only trip to the junior championships.

=== 2010–current ===
In 2010 Koehler would team up with her mother Sharon Cormier and would enter the 2010 Yukon/NWT Scotties Tournament of Hearts. Playing second, the team would finish round robin in a three team tie. In the first tiebreaker, the Cormier team would defeat Kerry Galusha 10–4, and then defeated Leslie Grant in the second tiebreaker 8–5, winning the championship and the right to represent NWT/Yukon at the 2010 Scotties Tournament of Hearts. At the 2010 event, the team would defeat the defending champions Team Canada in round robin play. This was the third time in the history of the territories competing at the event, that this would occur. They were the second team from the NWT to defeat the defending champions. The first was Kerry Galusha in 2009. The team finished round robin with a 4–7 record.

The team would compete again at the 2011 Yukon/NWT Scotties Tournament of Hearts, looking to repeat as the Territorial champions, however they would fall short coming in second place to Galusha.

For the 2011/2012 curling season Sharon Cormier and Megan Koehler joined Galusha, creating a five-person team. Koehler, Wendy Miller and Shona Barbour would alternate between lead, second and fifth. Koehler would play lead or fifth in the rotation. With this combination, the team found early success during the 2011/2012 season. During the World Curling Tour, they defeated defending Canadian champion Amber Holland, and Olympic Silver Medalist Cheryl Bernard, and for the first time qualified for the playoffs during a tour event. They advanced to the playoffs at the 2011 Boundary Ford Curling Classic, however they would lose the quarterfinal to Edmonton's Tiffany Odegard. The team qualified for the 2012 Scotties Tournament of Hearts. At the 2012 event, things would start off well, with Galusha winning the 2012 Ford Hot Shots, and the team starting off with a 2–1 record in the first three games. After catching the flu, which was heavily circulating amongst all teams, Galusha would miss two games, one of which found Miller sitting out with the flu. This left three players on the ice. Koehler threw the first three stones, Barbour threw the next three stones, and Cormier threw the final two skip stones. The team could not recover from Galusha's absence and would finish round robin with a 4–7 record. Although the team finished with a disappointing record, it would mark a second occasion for Koehler defeating the defending champions, Team Canada (Amber Holland) during round robin. Marking the fourth time in history, a team from the Territories would achieve this. They would also defeat the eventual champions, Team Alberta's Heather Nedohin.

== Personal life ==
Koehler works as a birth and postpartum doula. She is married and has three children.
