= 2009 Scotties Tournament of Hearts =

- Host city: Victoria, British Columbia
- Arena: Save-On-Foods; Memorial Centre
- Dates: February 21–March 1
- Attendance: 70,218
- Winner: Canada
- Curling club: St. Vital CC, Winnipeg
- Skip: Jennifer Jones
- Third: Cathy Overton-Clapham
- Second: Jill Officer
- Lead: Dawn Askin
- Alternate: Jennifer Clark-Rouire
- Coach: Janet Arnott
- Finalist: British Columbia (Marla Mallett)

The 2009 Scotties Tournament of Hearts, the Canadian women's national curling championship, was held from February 21 to March 1 at the Save-On-Foods Memorial Centre in Victoria, British Columbia.

== Teams ==
The teams were listed as follows:

| Team Canada | Alberta | British Columbia |
|---|---|---|
| St. Vital CC, Winnipeg Skip: Jennifer Jones; Third: Cathy Overton-Clapham; Second: Jill Officer; Lead: Dawn Askin; Alternate: Jennifer Clark-Rouire | Calgary CC & Calgary WC, Calgary Skip: Cheryl Bernard; Third: Susan O'Connor; Second: Carolyn Darbyshire; Lead: Cori Bartel; Alternate: Karen Russ | Vancouver CC, Vancouver Skip: Marla Mallett; Third: Grace MacInnes; Second: Diane Gushulak; Lead: Jacalyn Brown; Alternate: Adina Tasaka |
| Manitoba | New Brunswick | Newfoundland and Labrador |
| Fort Rouge CC, Winnipeg Skip: Barb Spencer; Third: Darcy Robertson; Second: Brette Richards; Lead: Barb Enright; Alternate: Kristy Jenion | Capital WC, Fredericton Skip: Andrea Kelly; Third: Denise Nowlan; Second: Jodie DeSolla; Lead: Lianne Sobey; Alternate: Melissa Adams | St. John's CC, St. John's Skip: Heather Strong; Third: Cathy Cunningham; Second: Laura Strong; Lead: Peg Goss; Alternate: Susan O'Leary |
| Nova Scotia | Ontario | Prince Edward Island |
| Dartmouth CC, Dartmouth Skip: Nancy McConnery; Third: Jennifer Crouse; Second: Sheena Gilman; Lead: Jill Thomas; Alternate: Colleen Pinkney | Fort William CC, Thunder Bay Skip: Krista McCarville; Third: Tara George; Second: Kari MacLean; Lead: Lorraine Lang; Alternate: Ashley Miharija | Charlottetown CC, Charlottetown Fourth: Robyn MacPhee; Skip: Rebecca Jean MacPhee; Second: Shelley Muzika; Lead: Tammi Lowther; Alternate: Nancy Cameron |
| Quebec | Saskatchewan | Northwest Territories/Yukon |
| CC Etchemin, Saint-Romuald Skip: Marie-France Larouche; Third: Nancy Bélanger; Second: Annie Lemay; Lead: Joëlle Sabourin; Alternate: Veronique Brassard | CN Curling Club, Saskatoon Skip: Stefanie Lawton; Third: Marliese Kasner; Second: Sherri Singler; Lead: Lana Vey; Alternate: Teejay Surik | Yellowknife CC, Yellowknife Skip: Kerry Galusha; Third: Dawn Moses; Second: Shona Barbour; Lead: Heather McCagg; Alternate: Sharon Cormier |

== Map of teams ==
Team Canada Provincial Winners

== Round Robin Standings ==
Final Round Robin standings

Key
| Teams to Playoffs |
| Teams to Tiebreaker |

| Locale | Skip | W | L | W–L | PF | PA | EW | EL | BE | SE | S% |
|---|---|---|---|---|---|---|---|---|---|---|---|
| British Columbia | Marla Mallett | 8 | 3 | – | 79 | 60 | 45 | 43 | 15 | 10 | 81% |
| Quebec | Marie-France Larouche | 7 | 4 | 2–1; 1–0 | 79 | 71 | 50 | 48 | 6 | 8 | 80% |
| Saskatchewan | Stefanie Lawton | 7 | 4 | 2–1; 0–1 | 87 | 75 | 53 | 47 | 6 | 16 | 83% |
| Prince Edward Island | Rebecca Jean MacPhee | 7 | 4 | 1–2; 1–0 | 79 | 72 | 49 | 46 | 7 | 14 | 77% |
| Canada | Jennifer Jones | 7 | 4 | 1–2; 0–1 | 82 | 58 | 50 | 39 | 9 | 15 | 83% |
| Ontario | Krista McCarville | 6 | 5 | 1–0 | 81 | 76 | 50 | 52 | 9 | 6 | 79% |
| Alberta | Cheryl Bernard | 6 | 5 | 0–1 | 69 | 66 | 48 | 42 | 15 | 12 | 81% |
| New Brunswick | Andrea Kelly | 5 | 6 | 1–0 | 60 | 77 | 41 | 46 | 13 | 8 | 78% |
| Newfoundland and Labrador | Heather Strong | 5 | 6 | 0–1 | 81 | 73 | 49 | 50 | 9 | 10 | 81% |
| Northwest Territories/Yukon | Kerry Galusha | 4 | 7 | – | 77 | 83 | 51 | 52 | 5 | 12 | 75% |
| Nova Scotia | Nancy McConnery | 2 | 9 | 1–0 | 51 | 81 | 37 | 49 | 14 | 5 | 74% |
| Manitoba | Barb Spencer | 2 | 9 | 0–1 | 58 | 91 | 41 | 50 | 8 | 8 | 77% |

== Round Robin results ==
All draw times are listed in Pacific Time (UTC−08:00).

=== Draw 1 ===
Saturday, February 21, 12:00 pm

| Sheet A | 1 | 2 | 3 | 4 | 5 | 6 | 7 | 8 | 9 | 10 | Final |
|---|---|---|---|---|---|---|---|---|---|---|---|
| British Columbia (Mallett) | 0 | 0 | 2 | 0 | 0 | 1 | 0 | 2 | 1 | 2 | 8 |
| Saskatchewan (Lawton) 🔨 | 0 | 1 | 0 | 3 | 1 | 0 | 2 | 0 | 0 | 0 | 7 |

| Sheet B | 1 | 2 | 3 | 4 | 5 | 6 | 7 | 8 | 9 | 10 | 11 | Final |
|---|---|---|---|---|---|---|---|---|---|---|---|---|
| Northwest Territories/Yukon (Galusha) | 0 | 1 | 1 | 0 | 2 | 0 | 0 | 1 | 2 | 0 | 0 | 7 |
| Prince Edward Island (MacPhee) 🔨 | 1 | 0 | 0 | 2 | 0 | 0 | 2 | 0 | 0 | 2 | 1 | 8 |

| Sheet C | 1 | 2 | 3 | 4 | 5 | 6 | 7 | 8 | 9 | 10 | Final |
|---|---|---|---|---|---|---|---|---|---|---|---|
| New Brunswick (Kelly) | 0 | 1 | 0 | 1 | 0 | 2 | 0 | 0 | 1 | 0 | 5 |
| Quebec (Larouche) 🔨 | 2 | 0 | 2 | 0 | 1 | 0 | 0 | 1 | 0 | 1 | 7 |

| Sheet D | 1 | 2 | 3 | 4 | 5 | 6 | 7 | 8 | 9 | 10 | Final |
|---|---|---|---|---|---|---|---|---|---|---|---|
| Ontario (McCarville) 🔨 | 1 | 0 | 3 | 0 | 1 | 0 | 0 | 1 | 0 | 3 | 9 |
| Newfoundland and Labrador (Strong) | 0 | 2 | 0 | 1 | 0 | 1 | 1 | 0 | 2 | 0 | 7 |

=== Draw 2 ===
Saturday, February 21, 7:00 pm

| Sheet A | 1 | 2 | 3 | 4 | 5 | 6 | 7 | 8 | 9 | 10 | Final |
|---|---|---|---|---|---|---|---|---|---|---|---|
| Quebec (Larouche) 🔨 | 3 | 0 | 1 | 0 | 1 | 0 | 3 | 1 | 0 | X | 9 |
| Northwest Territories/Yukon (Galusha) | 0 | 2 | 0 | 2 | 0 | 1 | 0 | 0 | 1 | X | 6 |

| Sheet B | 1 | 2 | 3 | 4 | 5 | 6 | 7 | 8 | 9 | 10 | Final |
|---|---|---|---|---|---|---|---|---|---|---|---|
| Alberta (Bernard) 🔨 | 1 | 0 | 0 | 2 | 0 | 0 | X | X | X | X | 3 |
| Canada (Jones) | 0 | 3 | 1 | 0 | 3 | 2 | X | X | X | X | 9 |

| Sheet C | 1 | 2 | 3 | 4 | 5 | 6 | 7 | 8 | 9 | 10 | 11 | Final |
|---|---|---|---|---|---|---|---|---|---|---|---|---|
| Nova Scotia (McConnery) | 0 | 0 | 0 | 1 | 1 | 0 | 1 | 0 | 1 | 0 | 1 | 5 |
| Manitoba (Spencer) 🔨 | 1 | 0 | 0 | 0 | 0 | 1 | 0 | 1 | 0 | 1 | 0 | 4 |

| Sheet D | 1 | 2 | 3 | 4 | 5 | 6 | 7 | 8 | 9 | 10 | Final |
|---|---|---|---|---|---|---|---|---|---|---|---|
| New Brunswick (Kelly) | 0 | 0 | 0 | 1 | 0 | 0 | 0 | X | X | X | 1 |
| Prince Edward Island (MacPhee) 🔨 | 0 | 2 | 1 | 0 | 1 | 1 | 2 | X | X | X | 7 |

=== Draw 3 ===
Sunday, February 22, 8:30 am

| Sheet B | 1 | 2 | 3 | 4 | 5 | 6 | 7 | 8 | 9 | 10 | 11 | Final |
|---|---|---|---|---|---|---|---|---|---|---|---|---|
| Newfoundland and Labrador (Strong) 🔨 | 0 | 2 | 0 | 1 | 0 | 2 | 0 | 1 | 0 | 2 | 0 | 8 |
| British Columbia (Mallett) | 0 | 0 | 2 | 0 | 1 | 0 | 4 | 0 | 1 | 0 | 1 | 9 |

| Sheet C | 1 | 2 | 3 | 4 | 5 | 6 | 7 | 8 | 9 | 10 | Final |
|---|---|---|---|---|---|---|---|---|---|---|---|
| Ontario (McCarville) 🔨 | 2 | 0 | 2 | 0 | 0 | 2 | 1 | 0 | 0 | 1 | 8 |
| Saskatchewan (Lawton) | 0 | 2 | 0 | 1 | 2 | 0 | 0 | 2 | 0 | 0 | 7 |

=== Draw 4 ===
Sunday, February 22, 1:00 pm

| Sheet A | 1 | 2 | 3 | 4 | 5 | 6 | 7 | 8 | 9 | 10 | Final |
|---|---|---|---|---|---|---|---|---|---|---|---|
| Canada (Jones) 🔨 | 3 | 2 | 1 | 0 | 1 | 2 | X | X | X | X | 9 |
| Nova Scotia (McConnery) | 0 | 0 | 0 | 1 | 0 | 0 | X | X | X | X | 1 |

| Sheet B | 1 | 2 | 3 | 4 | 5 | 6 | 7 | 8 | 9 | 10 | Final |
|---|---|---|---|---|---|---|---|---|---|---|---|
| Prince Edward Island (MacPhee) 🔨 | 1 | 0 | 1 | 0 | 0 | 0 | 1 | 1 | 0 | X | 4 |
| Quebec (Larouche) | 0 | 2 | 0 | 3 | 1 | 1 | 0 | 0 | 2 | X | 9 |

| Sheet C | 1 | 2 | 3 | 4 | 5 | 6 | 7 | 8 | 9 | 10 | Final |
|---|---|---|---|---|---|---|---|---|---|---|---|
| Northwest Territories/Yukon (Galusha) 🔨 | 1 | 0 | 1 | 0 | 1 | 0 | 2 | 0 | 2 | 0 | 7 |
| New Brunswick (Kelly) | 0 | 2 | 0 | 2 | 0 | 1 | 0 | 2 | 0 | 1 | 8 |

| Sheet D | 1 | 2 | 3 | 4 | 5 | 6 | 7 | 8 | 9 | 10 | Final |
|---|---|---|---|---|---|---|---|---|---|---|---|
| Alberta (Bernard) 🔨 | 0 | 1 | 0 | 0 | 2 | 0 | 1 | 1 | 0 | 1 | 6 |
| Manitoba (Spencer) | 0 | 0 | 1 | 1 | 0 | 2 | 0 | 0 | 1 | 0 | 5 |

=== Draw 5 ===
Sunday, February 22, 6:30 pm

| Sheet A | 1 | 2 | 3 | 4 | 5 | 6 | 7 | 8 | 9 | 10 | Final |
|---|---|---|---|---|---|---|---|---|---|---|---|
| Saskatchewan (Lawton) | 0 | 2 | 2 | 0 | 1 | 0 | 1 | 0 | 1 | 0 | 7 |
| Newfoundland and Labrador (Strong) 🔨 | 1 | 0 | 0 | 1 | 0 | 2 | 0 | 5 | 0 | 1 | 10 |

| Sheet B | 1 | 2 | 3 | 4 | 5 | 6 | 7 | 8 | 9 | 10 | Final |
|---|---|---|---|---|---|---|---|---|---|---|---|
| Nova Scotia (McConnery) | 0 | 1 | 0 | 0 | 0 | 0 | 2 | 0 | 1 | 0 | 4 |
| Alberta (Bernard) 🔨 | 2 | 0 | 1 | 0 | 0 | 0 | 0 | 2 | 0 | 1 | 6 |

| Sheet C | 1 | 2 | 3 | 4 | 5 | 6 | 7 | 8 | 9 | 10 | Final |
|---|---|---|---|---|---|---|---|---|---|---|---|
| Manitoba (Spencer) | 0 | 1 | 0 | 3 | 0 | 0 | 0 | 1 | 0 | X | 5 |
| Canada (Jones) 🔨 | 2 | 0 | 1 | 0 | 3 | 1 | 2 | 0 | 3 | X | 12 |

| Sheet D | 1 | 2 | 3 | 4 | 5 | 6 | 7 | 8 | 9 | 10 | Final |
|---|---|---|---|---|---|---|---|---|---|---|---|
| British Columbia (Mallett) 🔨 | 1 | 0 | 0 | 0 | 2 | 0 | 2 | 0 | 3 | 0 | 8 |
| Ontario (McCarville) | 0 | 0 | 2 | 1 | 0 | 2 | 0 | 1 | 0 | 1 | 7 |

=== Draw 6 ===
Monday, February 23, 8:30 am

| Sheet A | 1 | 2 | 3 | 4 | 5 | 6 | 7 | 8 | 9 | 10 | Final |
|---|---|---|---|---|---|---|---|---|---|---|---|
| Ontario (McCarville) 🔨 | 1 | 0 | 0 | 0 | 1 | 0 | 1 | 0 | 0 | 0 | 3 |
| New Brunswick (Kelly) | 0 | 1 | 0 | 1 | 0 | 1 | 0 | 1 | 0 | 1 | 5 |

| Sheet B | 1 | 2 | 3 | 4 | 5 | 6 | 7 | 8 | 9 | 10 | 11 | Final |
|---|---|---|---|---|---|---|---|---|---|---|---|---|
| Newfoundland and Labrador (Strong) | 0 | 1 | 0 | 4 | 0 | 1 | 0 | 0 | 2 | 0 | 0 | 8 |
| Northwest Territories/Yukon (Galusha) 🔨 | 2 | 0 | 2 | 0 | 1 | 0 | 0 | 1 | 0 | 2 | 1 | 9 |

| Sheet C | 1 | 2 | 3 | 4 | 5 | 6 | 7 | 8 | 9 | 10 | Final |
|---|---|---|---|---|---|---|---|---|---|---|---|
| British Columbia (Mallett) 🔨 | 0 | 2 | 1 | 0 | 2 | 0 | 2 | 0 | 0 | 0 | 7 |
| Quebec (Larouche) | 0 | 0 | 0 | 1 | 0 | 2 | 0 | 1 | 1 | 1 | 6 |

| Sheet D | 1 | 2 | 3 | 4 | 5 | 6 | 7 | 8 | 9 | 10 | Final |
|---|---|---|---|---|---|---|---|---|---|---|---|
| Saskatchewan (Lawton) 🔨 | 2 | 0 | 3 | 0 | 4 | 0 | 1 | 0 | 1 | 1 | 12 |
| Prince Edward Island (MacPhee) | 0 | 4 | 0 | 2 | 0 | 2 | 0 | 3 | 0 | 0 | 11 |

=== Draw 7 ===
Monday, February 23, 1:00 pm

| Sheet A | 1 | 2 | 3 | 4 | 5 | 6 | 7 | 8 | 9 | 10 | Final |
|---|---|---|---|---|---|---|---|---|---|---|---|
| Northwest Territories/Yukon (Galusha) 🔨 | 0 | 0 | 2 | 0 | 0 | 1 | 2 | 1 | 1 | 0 | 7 |
| Manitoba (Spencer) | 2 | 2 | 0 | 1 | 2 | 0 | 0 | 0 | 0 | 1 | 8 |

| Sheet B | 1 | 2 | 3 | 4 | 5 | 6 | 7 | 8 | 9 | 10 | Final |
|---|---|---|---|---|---|---|---|---|---|---|---|
| New Brunswick (Kelly) | 0 | 0 | 1 | 0 | 0 | 1 | 0 | 1 | 1 | 0 | 3 |
| Canada (Jones) 🔨 | 1 | 0 | 0 | 0 | 1 | 0 | 1 | 0 | 0 | 2 | 5 |

| Sheet C | 1 | 2 | 3 | 4 | 5 | 6 | 7 | 8 | 9 | 10 | Final |
|---|---|---|---|---|---|---|---|---|---|---|---|
| Prince Edward Island (MacPhee) 🔨 | 0 | 1 | 0 | 1 | 1 | 3 | 0 | 2 | 0 | X | 8 |
| Nova Scotia (McConnery) | 1 | 0 | 1 | 0 | 0 | 0 | 3 | 0 | 1 | X | 6 |

| Sheet D | 1 | 2 | 3 | 4 | 5 | 6 | 7 | 8 | 9 | 10 | 11 | Final |
|---|---|---|---|---|---|---|---|---|---|---|---|---|
| Quebec (Larouche) 🔨 | 0 | 0 | 0 | 2 | 0 | 3 | 0 | 1 | 0 | 1 | 0 | 7 |
| Alberta (Bernard) | 0 | 1 | 1 | 0 | 1 | 0 | 2 | 0 | 2 | 0 | 1 | 8 |

=== Draw 8 ===
Monday, February 23, 6:30 pm

| Sheet A | 1 | 2 | 3 | 4 | 5 | 6 | 7 | 8 | 9 | 10 | Final |
|---|---|---|---|---|---|---|---|---|---|---|---|
| Alberta (Bernard) | 0 | 0 | 0 | 0 | 0 | 2 | 0 | 0 | 1 | 1 | 4 |
| British Columbia (Mallett) 🔨 | 0 | 0 | 0 | 0 | 2 | 0 | 1 | 0 | 0 | 0 | 3 |

| Sheet B | 1 | 2 | 3 | 4 | 5 | 6 | 7 | 8 | 9 | 10 | Final |
|---|---|---|---|---|---|---|---|---|---|---|---|
| Nova Scotia (McConnery) | 0 | 0 | 1 | 0 | 1 | 0 | 0 | 2 | 0 | X | 4 |
| Saskatchewan (Lawton) 🔨 | 2 | 0 | 0 | 3 | 0 | 1 | 1 | 0 | 1 | X | 8 |

| Sheet C | 1 | 2 | 3 | 4 | 5 | 6 | 7 | 8 | 9 | 10 | Final |
|---|---|---|---|---|---|---|---|---|---|---|---|
| Canada (Jones) 🔨 | 1 | 0 | 1 | 0 | 1 | 0 | 1 | 0 | 1 | 1 | 6 |
| Ontario (McCarville) | 0 | 2 | 0 | 2 | 0 | 0 | 0 | 1 | 0 | 0 | 5 |

| Sheet D | 1 | 2 | 3 | 4 | 5 | 6 | 7 | 8 | 9 | 10 | Final |
|---|---|---|---|---|---|---|---|---|---|---|---|
| Manitoba (Spencer) | 0 | 1 | 0 | 0 | 2 | 0 | 0 | 0 | 1 | 4 | 8 |
| Newfoundland and Labrador (Strong) 🔨 | 0 | 0 | 1 | 1 | 0 | 0 | 0 | 1 | 0 | 0 | 3 |

=== Draw 9 ===
Tuesday, February 24, 8:30 am

| Sheet A | 1 | 2 | 3 | 4 | 5 | 6 | 7 | 8 | 9 | 10 | Final |
|---|---|---|---|---|---|---|---|---|---|---|---|
| Canada (Jones) 🔨 | 0 | 0 | 1 | 0 | 2 | 0 | 1 | 2 | 0 | 0 | 6 |
| Saskatchewan (Lawton) | 2 | 0 | 0 | 1 | 0 | 1 | 0 | 0 | 2 | 1 | 7 |

| Sheet B | 1 | 2 | 3 | 4 | 5 | 6 | 7 | 8 | 9 | 10 | Final |
|---|---|---|---|---|---|---|---|---|---|---|---|
| Manitoba (Spencer) 🔨 | 0 | 2 | 0 | 1 | 0 | 1 | 0 | X | X | X | 4 |
| British Columbia (Mallett) | 2 | 0 | 3 | 0 | 5 | 0 | 2 | X | X | X | 12 |

| Sheet C | 1 | 2 | 3 | 4 | 5 | 6 | 7 | 8 | 9 | 10 | Final |
|---|---|---|---|---|---|---|---|---|---|---|---|
| Alberta (Bernard) | 0 | 0 | 1 | 0 | 2 | 1 | 1 | 0 | 1 | X | 6 |
| Newfoundland and Labrador (Strong) 🔨 | 2 | 3 | 0 | 2 | 0 | 0 | 0 | 1 | 0 | X | 8 |

| Sheet D | 1 | 2 | 3 | 4 | 5 | 6 | 7 | 8 | 9 | 10 | Final |
|---|---|---|---|---|---|---|---|---|---|---|---|
| Nova Scotia (McConnery) | 0 | 2 | 0 | 0 | 1 | 0 | 2 | 1 | 0 | 0 | 6 |
| Ontario (McCarville) 🔨 | 2 | 0 | 1 | 0 | 0 | 1 | 0 | 0 | 1 | 4 | 9 |

=== Draw 10 ===
Tuesday, February 24, 1:00 pm

| Sheet A | 1 | 2 | 3 | 4 | 5 | 6 | 7 | 8 | 9 | 10 | Final |
|---|---|---|---|---|---|---|---|---|---|---|---|
| Newfoundland and Labrador (Strong) 🔨 | 1 | 1 | 0 | 4 | 0 | 1 | 1 | 0 | 1 | X | 9 |
| Prince Edward Island (MacPhee) | 0 | 0 | 1 | 0 | 1 | 0 | 0 | 1 | 0 | X | 3 |

| Sheet B | 1 | 2 | 3 | 4 | 5 | 6 | 7 | 8 | 9 | 10 | 11 | Final |
|---|---|---|---|---|---|---|---|---|---|---|---|---|
| Ontario (McCarville) 🔨 | 2 | 0 | 3 | 0 | 1 | 0 | 1 | 0 | 1 | 0 | 0 | 8 |
| Quebec (Larouche) | 0 | 1 | 0 | 2 | 0 | 1 | 0 | 1 | 0 | 3 | 2 | 10 |

| Sheet C | 1 | 2 | 3 | 4 | 5 | 6 | 7 | 8 | 9 | 10 | Final |
|---|---|---|---|---|---|---|---|---|---|---|---|
| Saskatchewan (Lawton) 🔨 | 2 | 0 | 1 | 1 | 0 | 2 | 1 | 0 | 3 | X | 10 |
| Northwest Territories/Yukon (Galusha) | 0 | 3 | 0 | 0 | 1 | 0 | 0 | 2 | 0 | X | 6 |

| Sheet D | 1 | 2 | 3 | 4 | 5 | 6 | 7 | 8 | 9 | 10 | Final |
|---|---|---|---|---|---|---|---|---|---|---|---|
| British Columbia (Mallett) 🔨 | 0 | 2 | 0 | 0 | 2 | 0 | 0 | 1 | 0 | 2 | 7 |
| New Brunswick (Kelly) | 0 | 0 | 1 | 0 | 0 | 2 | 0 | 0 | 2 | 0 | 5 |

=== Draw 11 ===
Tuesday, February 24, 6:30 pm

| Sheet A | 1 | 2 | 3 | 4 | 5 | 6 | 7 | 8 | 9 | 10 | Final |
|---|---|---|---|---|---|---|---|---|---|---|---|
| Quebec (Larouche) 🔨 | 2 | 0 | 0 | 0 | 3 | 0 | 1 | 0 | 1 | X | 7 |
| Nova Scotia (McConnery) | 0 | 0 | 0 | 2 | 0 | 2 | 0 | 1 | 0 | X | 5 |

| Sheet B | 1 | 2 | 3 | 4 | 5 | 6 | 7 | 8 | 9 | 10 | Final |
|---|---|---|---|---|---|---|---|---|---|---|---|
| Prince Edward Island (MacPhee) 🔨 | 0 | 2 | 0 | 1 | 0 | 1 | 1 | 0 | 0 | 2 | 7 |
| Alberta (Bernard) | 0 | 0 | 2 | 0 | 1 | 0 | 0 | 2 | 1 | 0 | 6 |

| Sheet C | 1 | 2 | 3 | 4 | 5 | 6 | 7 | 8 | 9 | 10 | Final |
|---|---|---|---|---|---|---|---|---|---|---|---|
| New Brunswick (Kelly) 🔨 | 1 | 0 | 1 | 1 | 0 | 0 | 2 | 0 | 5 | X | 10 |
| Manitoba (Spencer) | 0 | 1 | 0 | 0 | 2 | 1 | 0 | 3 | 0 | X | 7 |

| Sheet D | 1 | 2 | 3 | 4 | 5 | 6 | 7 | 8 | 9 | 10 | Final |
|---|---|---|---|---|---|---|---|---|---|---|---|
| Northwest Territories/Yukon (Galusha) 🔨 | 1 | 0 | 3 | 0 | 2 | 0 | 1 | 0 | 2 | 1 | 10 |
| Canada (Jones) | 0 | 1 | 0 | 3 | 0 | 3 | 0 | 1 | 0 | 0 | 8 |

=== Draw 12 ===
Wednesday, February 25, 8:30 am

| Sheet A | 1 | 2 | 3 | 4 | 5 | 6 | 7 | 8 | 9 | 10 | Final |
|---|---|---|---|---|---|---|---|---|---|---|---|
| New Brunswick (Kelly) | 0 | 2 | 0 | 1 | 0 | 1 | 0 | X | X | X | 4 |
| Alberta (Bernard) 🔨 | 4 | 0 | 3 | 0 | 2 | 0 | 2 | X | X | X | 11 |

| Sheet B | 1 | 2 | 3 | 4 | 5 | 6 | 7 | 8 | 9 | 10 | Final |
|---|---|---|---|---|---|---|---|---|---|---|---|
| Northwest Territories/Yukon (Galusha) 🔨 | 1 | 0 | 1 | 0 | 2 | 0 | 2 | 0 | 0 | X | 6 |
| Nova Scotia (McConnery) | 0 | 1 | 0 | 1 | 0 | 0 | 0 | 0 | 1 | X | 3 |

| Sheet C | 1 | 2 | 3 | 4 | 5 | 6 | 7 | 8 | 9 | 10 | Final |
|---|---|---|---|---|---|---|---|---|---|---|---|
| Quebec (Larouche) | 0 | 1 | 0 | 0 | 2 | 0 | 0 | X | X | X | 3 |
| Canada (Jones) 🔨 | 2 | 0 | 2 | 2 | 0 | 2 | 2 | X | X | X | 10 |

| Sheet D | 1 | 2 | 3 | 4 | 5 | 6 | 7 | 8 | 9 | 10 | Final |
|---|---|---|---|---|---|---|---|---|---|---|---|
| Prince Edward Island (MacPhee) 🔨 | 3 | 1 | 0 | 2 | 3 | 0 | X | X | X | X | 9 |
| Manitoba (Spencer) | 0 | 0 | 1 | 0 | 0 | 1 | X | X | X | X | 2 |

=== Draw 13 ===
Wednesday, February 25, 1:00 pm

| Sheet A | 1 | 2 | 3 | 4 | 5 | 6 | 7 | 8 | 9 | 10 | Final |
|---|---|---|---|---|---|---|---|---|---|---|---|
| Manitoba (Spencer) 🔨 | 1 | 0 | 1 | 0 | 3 | 0 | 0 | 1 | 0 | X | 6 |
| Ontario (McCarville) | 0 | 1 | 0 | 2 | 0 | 3 | 2 | 0 | 3 | X | 11 |

| Sheet B | 1 | 2 | 3 | 4 | 5 | 6 | 7 | 8 | 9 | 10 | Final |
|---|---|---|---|---|---|---|---|---|---|---|---|
| Canada (Jones) | 0 | 1 | 0 | 0 | 0 | 2 | 1 | 0 | 0 | X | 4 |
| Newfoundland and Labrador (Strong) 🔨 | 0 | 0 | 0 | 3 | 2 | 0 | 0 | 1 | 2 | X | 8 |

| Sheet C | 1 | 2 | 3 | 4 | 5 | 6 | 7 | 8 | 9 | 10 | Final |
|---|---|---|---|---|---|---|---|---|---|---|---|
| Nova Scotia (McConnery) | 0 | 0 | 1 | 0 | 0 | 1 | X | X | X | X | 2 |
| British Columbia (Mallett) 🔨 | 1 | 3 | 0 | 2 | 3 | 0 | X | X | X | X | 9 |

| Sheet D | 1 | 2 | 3 | 4 | 5 | 6 | 7 | 8 | 9 | 10 | 11 | Final |
|---|---|---|---|---|---|---|---|---|---|---|---|---|
| Alberta (Bernard) | 0 | 1 | 0 | 1 | 1 | 0 | 1 | 0 | 0 | 2 | 0 | 6 |
| Saskatchewan (Lawton) 🔨 | 1 | 0 | 0 | 0 | 0 | 2 | 0 | 2 | 1 | 0 | 1 | 7 |

=== Draw 14 ===
Wednesday, February 25, 7:00 pm

| Sheet A | 1 | 2 | 3 | 4 | 5 | 6 | 7 | 8 | 9 | 10 | Final |
|---|---|---|---|---|---|---|---|---|---|---|---|
| British Columbia (Mallett) 🔨 | 2 | 1 | 1 | 0 | 1 | 0 | 0 | 1 | 0 | X | 6 |
| Northwest Territories/Yukon (Galusha) | 0 | 0 | 0 | 1 | 0 | 1 | 1 | 0 | 1 | X | 4 |

| Sheet B | 1 | 2 | 3 | 4 | 5 | 6 | 7 | 8 | 9 | 10 | Final |
|---|---|---|---|---|---|---|---|---|---|---|---|
| Saskatchewan (Lawton) | 0 | 0 | 2 | 1 | 2 | 1 | 0 | 4 | X | X | 10 |
| New Brunswick (Kelly) 🔨 | 2 | 1 | 0 | 0 | 0 | 0 | 1 | 0 | X | X | 4 |

| Sheet C | 1 | 2 | 3 | 4 | 5 | 6 | 7 | 8 | 9 | 10 | Final |
|---|---|---|---|---|---|---|---|---|---|---|---|
| Ontario (McCarville) 🔨 | 0 | 2 | 0 | 2 | 0 | 1 | 0 | 1 | 0 | 2 | 8 |
| Prince Edward Island (MacPhee) | 0 | 0 | 2 | 0 | 1 | 0 | 3 | 0 | 1 | 0 | 7 |

| Sheet D | 1 | 2 | 3 | 4 | 5 | 6 | 7 | 8 | 9 | 10 | Final |
|---|---|---|---|---|---|---|---|---|---|---|---|
| Newfoundland and Labrador (Strong) 🔨 | 1 | 0 | 1 | 0 | 2 | 0 | 2 | 0 | 3 | X | 9 |
| Quebec (Larouche) | 0 | 2 | 0 | 1 | 0 | 1 | 0 | 1 | 0 | X | 5 |

=== Draw 15 ===
Thursday, February 26, 8:30 am

| Sheet A | 1 | 2 | 3 | 4 | 5 | 6 | 7 | 8 | 9 | 10 | 11 | Final |
|---|---|---|---|---|---|---|---|---|---|---|---|---|
| Prince Edward Island (MacPhee) | 0 | 0 | 0 | 2 | 2 | 0 | 0 | 2 | 1 | 0 | 1 | 8 |
| Canada (Jones) 🔨 | 1 | 1 | 0 | 0 | 0 | 2 | 2 | 0 | 0 | 1 | 0 | 7 |

| Sheet B | 1 | 2 | 3 | 4 | 5 | 6 | 7 | 8 | 9 | 10 | Final |
|---|---|---|---|---|---|---|---|---|---|---|---|
| Quebec (Larouche) | 0 | 0 | 3 | 0 | 1 | 0 | 2 | 0 | 3 | X | 9 |
| Manitoba (Spencer) 🔨 | 0 | 1 | 0 | 1 | 0 | 1 | 0 | 1 | 0 | X | 4 |

| Sheet C | 1 | 2 | 3 | 4 | 5 | 6 | 7 | 8 | 9 | 10 | Final |
|---|---|---|---|---|---|---|---|---|---|---|---|
| Northwest Territories/Yukon (Galusha) | 1 | 2 | 0 | 1 | 0 | 0 | 0 | 0 | 2 | 0 | 6 |
| Alberta (Bernard) 🔨 | 0 | 0 | 1 | 0 | 3 | 0 | 1 | 2 | 0 | 1 | 8 |

| Sheet D | 1 | 2 | 3 | 4 | 5 | 6 | 7 | 8 | 9 | 10 | Final |
|---|---|---|---|---|---|---|---|---|---|---|---|
| New Brunswick (Kelly) | 0 | 0 | 2 | 0 | 2 | 2 | 1 | 0 | 0 | 2 | 9 |
| Nova Scotia (McConnery) 🔨 | 0 | 2 | 0 | 4 | 0 | 0 | 0 | 2 | 0 | 0 | 8 |

=== Draw 16 ===
Thursday, February 26, 1:00 pm

| Sheet A | 1 | 2 | 3 | 4 | 5 | 6 | 7 | 8 | 9 | 10 | Final |
|---|---|---|---|---|---|---|---|---|---|---|---|
| Saskatchewan (Lawton) | 0 | 1 | 0 | 0 | 2 | 0 | 0 | 1 | 1 | 0 | 5 |
| Quebec (Larouche) 🔨 | 1 | 0 | 1 | 1 | 0 | 1 | 1 | 0 | 0 | 2 | 7 |

| Sheet B | 1 | 2 | 3 | 4 | 5 | 6 | 7 | 8 | 9 | 10 | Final |
|---|---|---|---|---|---|---|---|---|---|---|---|
| British Columbia (Mallett) 🔨 | 0 | 0 | 0 | 0 | 2 | 0 | 1 | 0 | 2 | 0 | 5 |
| Prince Edward Island (MacPhee) | 0 | 2 | 0 | 1 | 0 | 2 | 0 | 1 | 0 | 1 | 7 |

| Sheet C | 1 | 2 | 3 | 4 | 5 | 6 | 7 | 8 | 9 | 10 | Final |
|---|---|---|---|---|---|---|---|---|---|---|---|
| Newfoundland and Labrador (Strong) | 1 | 0 | 1 | 0 | 0 | 0 | 2 | 1 | 0 | X | 5 |
| New Brunswick (Kelly) 🔨 | 0 | 1 | 0 | 1 | 1 | 3 | 0 | 0 | 0 | X | 6 |

| Sheet D | 1 | 2 | 3 | 4 | 5 | 6 | 7 | 8 | 9 | 10 | Final |
|---|---|---|---|---|---|---|---|---|---|---|---|
| Ontario (McCarville) | 0 | 1 | 0 | 0 | 3 | 0 | 1 | 1 | 1 | 0 | 7 |
| Northwest Territories/Yukon (Galusha) 🔨 | 2 | 0 | 2 | 1 | 0 | 1 | 0 | 0 | 0 | 3 | 9 |

=== Draw 17 ===
Thursday, February 26, 6:30 pm

| Sheet A | 1 | 2 | 3 | 4 | 5 | 6 | 7 | 8 | 9 | 10 | 11 | Final |
|---|---|---|---|---|---|---|---|---|---|---|---|---|
| Nova Scotia (McConnery) 🔨 | 1 | 0 | 0 | 2 | 1 | 0 | 1 | 1 | 0 | 0 | 1 | 7 |
| Newfoundland and Labrador (Strong) | 0 | 0 | 1 | 0 | 0 | 2 | 0 | 0 | 2 | 1 | 0 | 6 |

| Sheet B | 1 | 2 | 3 | 4 | 5 | 6 | 7 | 8 | 9 | 10 | 11 | Final |
|---|---|---|---|---|---|---|---|---|---|---|---|---|
| Alberta (Bernard) 🔨 | 0 | 1 | 0 | 0 | 1 | 0 | 1 | 0 | 1 | 1 | 0 | 5 |
| Ontario (McCarville) | 0 | 0 | 2 | 0 | 0 | 2 | 0 | 1 | 0 | 0 | 1 | 6 |

| Sheet C | 1 | 2 | 3 | 4 | 5 | 6 | 7 | 8 | 9 | 10 | Final |
|---|---|---|---|---|---|---|---|---|---|---|---|
| Manitoba (Spencer) 🔨 | 1 | 0 | 0 | 0 | 1 | 0 | 0 | 2 | 1 | X | 5 |
| Saskatchewan (Lawton) | 0 | 0 | 3 | 1 | 0 | 1 | 2 | 0 | 0 | X | 7 |

| Sheet D | 1 | 2 | 3 | 4 | 5 | 6 | 7 | 8 | 9 | 10 | Final |
|---|---|---|---|---|---|---|---|---|---|---|---|
| Canada (Jones) 🔨 | 2 | 0 | 0 | 0 | 2 | 0 | 1 | 0 | 0 | 1 | 6 |
| British Columbia (Mallett) | 0 | 1 | 0 | 1 | 0 | 1 | 0 | 1 | 1 | 0 | 5 |

== Tiebreaker ==
Friday, February 27, 1:00 pm

| Sheet B | 1 | 2 | 3 | 4 | 5 | 6 | 7 | 8 | 9 | 10 | 11 | Final |
|---|---|---|---|---|---|---|---|---|---|---|---|---|
| Prince Edward Island (MacPhee) 🔨 | 0 | 1 | 2 | 0 | 1 | 0 | 1 | 0 | 0 | 0 | 0 | 5 |
| Canada (Jones) | 0 | 0 | 0 | 2 | 0 | 1 | 0 | 0 | 1 | 1 | 1 | 6 |

Player percentages
| Prince Edward Island | | Canada | |
|---|---|---|---|
| Tammi Lowther | 64% | Dawn Askin | 86% |
| Shelley Muzika | 74% | Jill Officer | 76% |
| Rebecca Jean MacPhee | 83% | Cathy Overton-Clapham | 77% |
| Robyn MacPhee | 73% | Jennifer Jones | 75% |
| Total | 73% | Total | 79% |

== Playoffs ==
Page playoff system
1 | British Columbia | 7
2 | Quebec | 5
3 | Saskatchewan | 6
4 | Canada | 8

Semifinal
2 | Quebec | 8
4 | Canada | 12

Final
1 | British Columbia | 5
4 | Canada | 8

=== 1 vs. 2 ===
Friday, February 27, 6:30 pm

| Sheet B | 1 | 2 | 3 | 4 | 5 | 6 | 7 | 8 | 9 | 10 | Final |
|---|---|---|---|---|---|---|---|---|---|---|---|
| Quebec (Larouche) | 0 | 0 | 1 | 0 | 1 | 0 | 1 | 0 | 1 | 1 | 5 |
| British Columbia (Mallett) 🔨 | 0 | 1 | 0 | 1 | 0 | 3 | 0 | 2 | 0 | 0 | 7 |

Player percentages
| Quebec | | British Columbia | |
|---|---|---|---|
| Joëlle Sabourin | 73% | Jacalyn Brown | 82% |
| Annie Lemay | 65% | Diane Gushulak | 86% |
| Nancy Bélanger | 73% | Grace MacInnes | 88% |
| Marie-France Larouche | 66% | Marla Mallett | 74% |
| Total | 69% | Total | 82% |

=== 3 vs. 4 ===
Saturday, February 28, 11:30 am

| Team | 1 | 2 | 3 | 4 | 5 | 6 | 7 | 8 | 9 | 10 | Final |
|---|---|---|---|---|---|---|---|---|---|---|---|
| Saskatchewan (Lawton) 🔨 | 1 | 0 | 0 | 0 | 1 | 0 | 2 | 0 | 2 | 0 | 6 |
| Canada (Jones) | 0 | 2 | 1 | 1 | 0 | 1 | 0 | 2 | 0 | 1 | 8 |

Player percentages
| Saskatchewan | | Canada | |
|---|---|---|---|
| Lana Vey | 81% | Dawn Askin | 86% |
| Sherri Singler | 80% | Jill Officer | 93% |
| Marliese Kasner | 81% | Cathy Overton-Clapham | 86% |
| Stefanie Lawton | 76% | Jennifer Jones | 80% |
| Total | 80% | Total | 86% |

=== Semifinal ===
Saturday, February 28, 4:00 pm

| Sheet B | 1 | 2 | 3 | 4 | 5 | 6 | 7 | 8 | 9 | 10 | Final |
|---|---|---|---|---|---|---|---|---|---|---|---|
| Canada (Jones) 🔨 | 1 | 4 | 0 | 0 | 2 | 0 | 2 | 0 | 3 | X | 12 |
| Quebec (Larouche) | 0 | 0 | 2 | 3 | 0 | 2 | 0 | 1 | 0 | X | 8 |

Player percentages
| Canada | | Quebec | |
|---|---|---|---|
| Dawn Askin | 74% | Joëlle Sabourin | 81% |
| Jill Officer | 75% | Annie Lemay | 75% |
| Cathy Overton-Clapham | 86% | Nancy Bélanger | 71% |
| Jennifer Jones | 71% | Marie-France Larouche | 64% |
| Total | 77% | Total | 73% |

=== Final ===
Sunday, March 1, 5:00 pm

| Sheet B | 1 | 2 | 3 | 4 | 5 | 6 | 7 | 8 | 9 | 10 | Final |
|---|---|---|---|---|---|---|---|---|---|---|---|
| Canada (Jones) | 1 | 0 | 2 | 0 | 2 | 0 | 2 | 0 | 1 | X | 8 |
| British Columbia (Mallett) 🔨 | 0 | 2 | 0 | 2 | 0 | 0 | 0 | 1 | 0 | X | 5 |

Player percentages
| Canada | | British Columbia | |
|---|---|---|---|
| Dawn Askin | 79% | Jacalyn Brown | 85% |
| Jill Officer | 91% | Diane Gushulak | 76% |
| Cathy Overton-Clapham | 80% | Grace MacInnes | 71% |
| Jennifer Jones | 89% | Marla Mallett | 78% |
| Total | 85% | Total | 78% |

== Statistics ==
=== Top 5 Player Percentages ===
Round robin only

Key
| First All-Star Team |
| Second All-Star Team |

| Leads | % |
|---|---|
| (Saskatchewan) Lana Vey | 90 |
| (Quebec) Joëlle Sabourin | 87 |
| (Manitoba) Barb Enright | 86 |
| (Alberta) Cori Bartel | 84 |
| (Canada) Dawn Askin | 84 |
| (Newfoundland and Labrador) Peg Goss | 84 |
| (Ontario) Lorraine Lang | 84 |

| Seconds | % |
|---|---|
| (Saskatchewan) Sherri Singler | 84 |
| (Canada) Jill Officer | 83 |
| (Alberta) Carolyn Darbyshire | 83 |
| (British Columbia) Diane Gushulak | 81 |
| (Manitoba) Brette Richards | 80 |

| Thirds | % |
|---|---|
| (Canada) Cathy Overton-Clapham | 86 |
| (Newfoundland and Labrador) Cathy Cunningham | 84 |
| (British Columbia) Grace MacInnes | 82 |
| (Alberta) Susan O'Connor | 82 |
| (Saskatchewan) Marliese Kasner | 80 |

| Skips | % |
|---|---|
| (Newfoundland and Labrador) Heather Strong | 79 |
| (British Columbia) Marla Mallett | 79 |
| (Saskatchewan) Stefanie Lawton | 78 |
| (Quebec) Marie-France Larouche | 78 |
| (Canada) Jennifer Jones | 78 |

=== Perfect games ===
Round robin only; minimum 10 shots thrown

| Player | Team | Position | Shots | Opponent |
|---|---|---|---|---|
| Diane Gushulak | British Columbia | Second | 20 | Alberta |
| Carolyn Darbyshire | Alberta | Lead | 14 | New Brunswick |

== Awards ==
=== All-Star teams ===
First Team
| Position | Name | Team |
|---|---|---|
| Skip | Stefanie Lawton | Saskatchewan |
| Third | Cathy Overton-Clapham | Canada |
| Second | Diane Gushulak | British Columbia |
| Lead | Lana Vey | Saskatchewan |

Second Team
| Position | Name | Team |
|---|---|---|
| Skip | Marla Mallett | British Columbia |
| Third | Grace MacInnes | British Columbia |
| Second | Sherri Singler | Saskatchewan |
| Lead | Joëlle Sabourin | Quebec |

=== Marj Mitchell Sportsmanship Award ===
The Marj Mitchell Sportsmanship Award was presented to the player chosen by their fellow peers as the curler that most exemplified sportsmanship and dedication to curling during the annual Scotties Tournament of Hearts.

| Name | Position | Team |
|---|---|---|
| Cori Bartel | Lead | Alberta |

=== Sandra Schmirler Most Valuable Player Award ===
The Sandra Schmirler Most Valuable Player Award was awarded to the top player in the playoff round by members of the media in the Scotties Tournament of Hearts.

| Name | Position | Team |
|---|---|---|
| Jennifer Jones | Skip | Canada |

=== Joan Mead Builder Award ===
The Joan Mead Builder Award recognizes a builder in the sport of curling named in the honour of the late CBC curling producer Joan Mead.

| Name | Contribution(s) |
|---|---|
| Linda Bolton | Scotties Tournament of Hearts volunteer |

=== Ford Hot Shots ===
The Ford Hot Shots was a skills competition preceding the round robin of the tournament. Each competitor had to perform a series of shots with each shot scoring between 0 and 5 points depending on where the stone came to rest. The winner of this edition of the event would win a two-year lease on a Ford Flex SEL FWD.

| Winner | Runner-Up | Score |
|---|---|---|
| (Alberta) Cheryl Bernard | (Saskatchewan) Sherri Singler | 23–19 |

=== Shot of the Week Award ===
The Shot of the Week Award was awarded to the curler who had been determined with the most outstanding shot during the tournament as voted on by TSN commentators.

| Name | Position | Team |
|---|---|---|
| Kerry Galusha | Skip | Northwest Territories/Yukon |

== Provincial and territorial playdowns ==
- 2009 Alberta Scotties Tournament of Hearts
- 2009 British Columbia Scotties Tournament of Hearts
- 2009 Manitoba Scotties Tournament of Hearts
- 2009 New Brunswick Scotties Tournament of Hearts
- 2009 Newfoundland and Labrador Scotties Tournament of Hearts
- 2009 Nova Scotia Scotties Tournament of Hearts
- 2009 Ontario Scotties Tournament of Hearts
- 2009 Prince Edward Island Scotties Tournament of Hearts
- 2009 Quebec Scotties Tournament of Hearts
- 2009 Saskatchewan Scotties Tournament of Hearts
- (Northwest Territories) 2009 NWT/Yukon Scotties Tournament of Hearts

== See also ==
- 2009 Tim Hortons Brier
- 2009 Canadian Olympic Curling Trials
