= Sydney Lake =

Lake in Kenora District, Ontario, Canada

- Location within Ontario
- Location: Northern Ontario
- Coordinates: 50.67°N 94.43°W
- Surface area: 14,400 acres (5,800 ha)
- Average depth: 65 ft (20 m)
- Max. depth: 240 ft (73 m)
- Water volume: 938,211 acre⋅ft (1.157266 km^{3})
- Surface elevation: 350 m (1,150 ft)

Sydney Lake is a small glacial lake located about 46 miles from Minaki, Ontario. It was named after Sydney Forester, who surveyed the area in the early 20th century for the Government of Canada.

== History ==
Native Americans inhabited the land in unknown time period. Evidence of this is seen in pictographs and rock paintings in nearby Pineapple Lake. Hudson's Bay Company set up a fur trade post on the Sturgeon River, a primary outflow of the lake. In 1933, John Fahlgren purchased a plot of land from entrepreneur Anton Vick. In 1950, Fahlgren contracted a small cabin for guests to come and stay.

== Description ==
In 1980, Sydney Lake Lodge opened. Water temperatures in Sydney Lake range from 45 °F (7.2 °C) and 70 °F (21.1 °C) providing habitat for both cold water and warm water fish including walleye, northern pike, and lake trout. There are over 100 islands located throughout the lake and its connecting bays, streams, and coves. Wildlife present in the area include beavers, marmots, wolverines, black bears, grizzly bears, moose, bald eagles, various types of birds, and turtles. A section of the lake is in Woodland Caribou Provincial Park.

== See also ==
- Minaki, Ontario
- Red Lake, Ontario
- List of lakes in Ontario
