= Susan O'Connor =

Canadian curler and Olympic medalist

- Curler
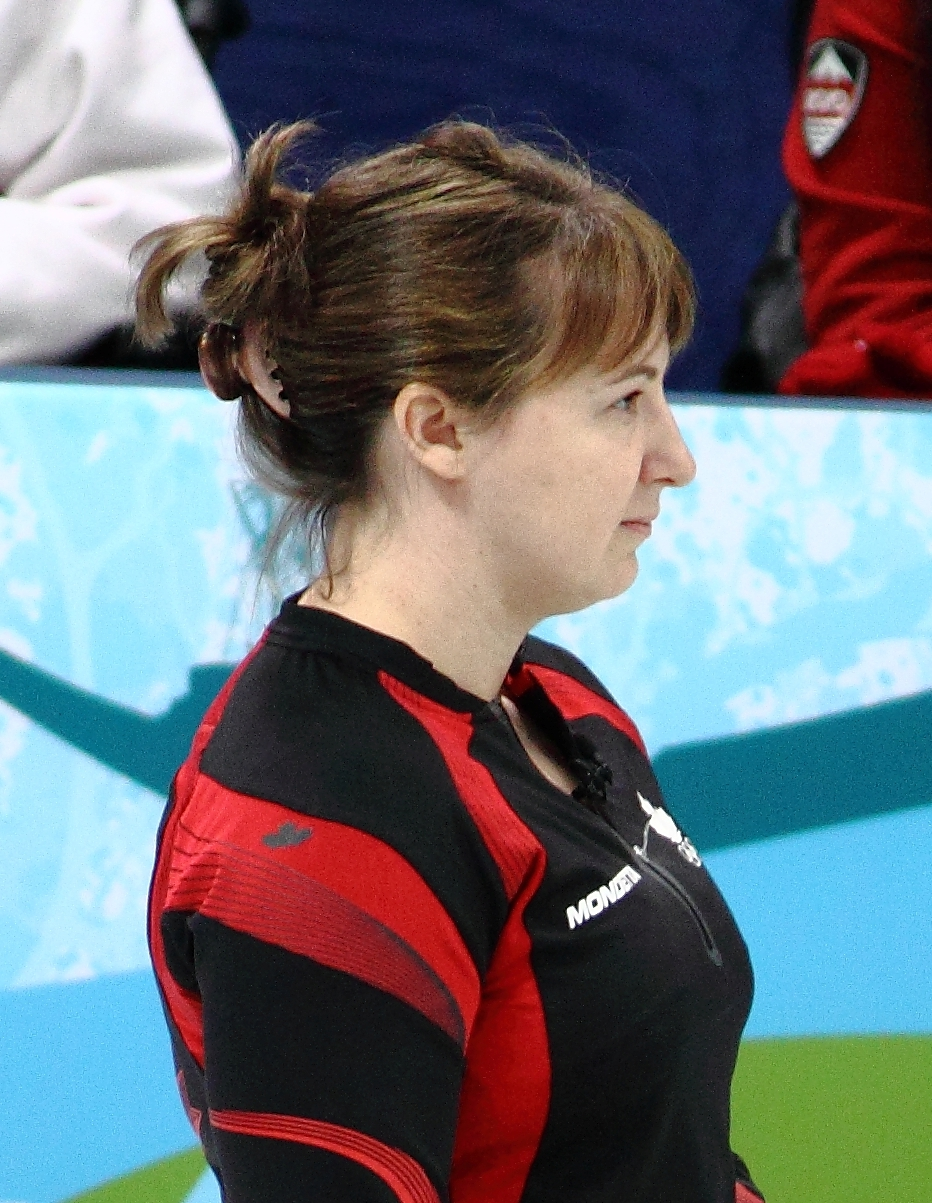
- Born: May 3, 1977 (age 49); Calgary, Alberta, Canada

Team
- Curling club: Calgary CC, Calgary, AB

Curling career
- Member Association: Alberta
- Hearts: 6 (2007, 2009, 2016, 2017, 2018, 2019)
- World Championship: 1 (2016)
- World Mixed Doubles Championship: 1 (2008)
- Olympic: 1 (2010)
- Top CTRS ranking: 4th (2006–07, 2007–08, 2008–09)
- Grand Slam victories: 1 (Players': 2010)
Medal record
Curling
Representing Canada
Winter Olympics
Silver medal – second place	2010 Vancouver
Representing Alberta
Canadian Olympic Curling Trials
Gold medal – first place	2009 Edmonton
Scotties Tournament of Hearts
Gold medal – first place	2016 Grande Prairie
Bronze medal – third place	2017 St. Catharines

Susan O'Connor (born May 3, 1977) is a Canadian curler from Calgary, Alberta. She is an Olympic silver medallist. She is currently the alternate on the Ashley Thevenot rink.

== Career ==
In 2000, O'Connor played third for Kevin Koe at the Canadian Mixed Curling Championship. The team, which also included Greg Northcott and Lawnie MacDonald, won the championship.

In 2007, O'Connor won her first provincial championship playing third for Cheryl Bernard, and represented Team Alberta at the 2007 Scotties Tournament of Hearts. They again represented Alberta at the Scotties in 2009.

At the 2008 Canadian Mixed Championship, O'Connor played third for Dean Ross, and won her second Mixed title with teammates Tim Krassman and Susan Wright. O'Connor and Ross represented Canada at the 2008 World Mixed Doubles Curling Championship as a result, and finished in fifth place.

With Team Bernard, O'Connor played in the Roar of the Rings Olympic Trials for the much coveted Olympic spot, winning the tournament. O'Connor represented Team Canada at the 2010 Winter Olympics in Vancouver, British Columbia, Canada, winning the silver medal in the final match versus Sweden.

On February 8, 2011, it was announced that the Bernard team would disband at the end of the 2010–2011 season. O'Connor, however, remained with Bernard, who added Lori Olson-Johns and Jennifer Sadleir to the team.

In 2012 Shannon Aleksic replaced Sadleir at lead. At the 2014 Scotties Tournament of Hearts O'Connor and Team Bernard won the silver medal, losing to Valerie Sweeting's team in the final.

At the 2016 World Women's Championship O'Connor played as alternate for Chelsea Carrey's team. The team finished 4th, losing to Russia in the bronze medal match.

== Personal life ==
O'Connor is employed as a respiratory therapist at Foothills Hospital in Calgary, Alberta. She is married to fellow curler Todd Brick and has one child.

== Teams ==
Season	Skip	Third	Second	Lead	Events
2004–05	Cheryl Bernard	Susan O'Connor	Jody McNabb	Karen Russ	
2005–06	Cheryl Bernard	Susan O'Connor	Carolyn Darbyshire	Cori Bartel	
2006–07	Cheryl Bernard	Susan O'Connor	Carolyn Darbyshire	Cori Bartel	2007 STOH
2007–08	Cheryl Bernard	Susan O'Connor	Carolyn Darbyshire	Cori Bartel	
2008–09	Cheryl Bernard	Susan O'Connor	Carolyn Darbyshire	Cori Bartel	2009 STOH
2009–10	Cheryl Bernard	Susan O'Connor	Carolyn Darbyshire	Cori Bartel	2009 COCT, 2010 OG
2010–11	Cheryl Bernard	Susan O'Connor	Carolyn Darbyshire	Cori Morris	
2011–12	Cheryl Bernard	Susan O'Connor	Lori Olson-Johns	Jennifer Sadleir	
2012–13	Cheryl Bernard	Susan O'Connor	Lori Olson-Johns	Shannon Aleksic	
2013–14	Cheryl Bernard	Susan O'Connor	Lori Olson-Johns	Shannon Aleksic	
2014–15	Susan O'Connor	Lawnie MacDonald	Denise Kinghorn	Cori Morris	
2015–16	Susan O'Connor	Jennifer Sadleir	Margo Weber	Joanne Sipka	
2016–17	Cheryl Bernard	Susan O'Connor	Carolyn McRorie	Lawnie MacDonald	
2017–18	Casey Scheidegger	Cary-Anne McTaggart	Jessie Haughian	Kristie Moore	Susan O'Connor
2018–19	Casey Scheidegger	Cary-Anne McTaggart	Jessie Haughian	Kristie Moore	Susan O'Connor
2019–20	Casey Scheidegger	Cary-Anne McTaggart	Jessie Haughian	Kristie Moore	Susan O'Connor
2020–21	Casey Scheidegger	Cary-Anne McTaggart	Jessie Haughian	Kristie Moore	Susan O'Connor
2021–22	Casey Scheidegger	Cary-Anne McTaggart	Jessie Haughian	Kristie Moore	Susan O'Connor
2022–23	Kristie Moore	Susan O'Connor	Janais DeJong	Valerie Ekelund	

== Grand Slam record ==
Key
C	Champion
F	Lost in Final
SF	Lost in Semifinal
QF	Lost in Quarterfinals
R16	Lost in the round of 16
Q	Did not advance to playoffs
T2	Played in Tier 2 event
DNP	Did not participate in event
N/A	Not a Grand Slam event that season

Event	2005–06	2006–07	2007–08	2008–09	2009–10	2010–11	2011–12	2012–13	2013–14	2014–15	2015–16	2016–17
National	N/A	N/A	N/A	N/A	N/A	N/A	N/A	N/A	N/A	N/A	DNP	QF
Players'	F	SF	SF	SF	C	QF	DNP	DNP	DNP	DNP	DNP	DNP

=== Former events ===
Event	2006–07	2007–08	2008–09	2009–10	2010–11	2011–12	2012–13	2013–14	2014–15
Autumn Gold	SF	Q	F	QF	QF	QF	QF	Q	Q
Colonial Square	N/A	N/A	N/A	N/A	N/A	N/A	Q	DNP	DNP
Wayden Transportation	QF	Q	SF	N/A	N/A	N/A	N/A	N/A	N/A
Sobeys Slam	N/A	Q	Q	N/A	DNP	N/A	N/A	N/A	N/A
Manitoba Lotteries	Q	SF	QF	QF	Q	SF	SF	DNP	N/A
