= Jennifer Clark-Rouire =

Canadian curler

- Curler
- Born: May 18, 1975 (age 51); Winnipeg, Manitoba, Canada

Team
- Curling club: Miami CC, Miami, MB
- Skip: Jennifer Clark-Rouire
- Third: Lisa McLeod
- Second: Jolene Callum
- Lead: Rachel Burtnyk

Curling career
- Member Association: Manitoba
- Hearts: 7 (2008, 2009, 2010, 2012, 2015, 2016, 2020)
- World Championship: 4 (2008, 2009, 2010, 2015)
- Top CTRS ranking: 20th (2018-19)
Medal record
Women's curling
Representing Canada
World Championships
Gold medal – first place	2008 Vernon
Silver medal – second place	2015 Sapporo
Bronze medal – third place	2010 Swift Current
Representing Manitoba
Scotties Tournament of Hearts
Gold medal – first place	2008 Regina
Gold medal – first place	2009 Victoria
Gold medal – first place	2010 Sault Ste. Marie
Gold medal – first place	2015 Moose Jaw
Gold medal – first place	2020 Moose Jaw
Bronze medal – third place	2012 Red Deer
Bronze medal – third place	2016 Grand Prairie
Canadian Olympic Curling Trials
Bronze medal – third place	2017 Ottawa

Jennifer Clark-Rouire (born May 18, 1975, in Winnipeg, Manitoba) is a Canadian curler. She currently throws skip stones for her rink out of Winnipeg, Manitoba. She is best known however as being the perennial alternate for Jennifer Jones at various national and world championships.

Clark-Rouire won 2008 the World Women's Curling Championship with skip Jennifer Jones, beating China in the final.

== Personal life ==
Clark-Rouire owns Storm Catering. She is married and has two children.
