= Wendy Miller =

Canadian curler (born 1981)

- Curler
- Born: March 3, 1981 (age 45); Fredericton, New Brunswick, Canada

Team
- Curling club: Yellowknife Curling Club; Yellowknife, NT
- Skip: Kerry Galusha
- Third: Ashley Green
- Second: Megan Cormier
- Lead: Wendy Miller

Curling career
- Hearts: 3 (2011, 2012, 2013)
- Top CTRS ranking: 40th (2011-12)
- Grand Slam victories: 0

Wendy Miller (born March 3, 1981) is a Canadian curler, who currently throws lead stones out of the Yellowknife Curling Club in Yellowknife.

== Career ==
=== 2011–current ===
With no junior curling experience, Miller made her National curling debut at the 2011 Scotties Tournament of Hearts, playing second stones for Kerry Galusha. The team would struggle through the tournament finishing round robin play with a 3-8 record.

For the 2011/2012 curling season Galusha, Miller, and lead Shona Barbour added Sharon Cormier and Megan Cormier to the team, creating a five-person team. Miller, Barbour and M. Cormier would alternate between lead, second and fifth. Miller would play second or fifth in the rotation. With this combination, the team found early success during the 2011/2012 season. During the World Curling Tour, they defeated defending Canadian champion Amber Holland, and Olympic Silver Medalist Cheryl Bernard, and for the first time qualified for the playoffs during a tour event. They advanced to the playoffs at the 2011 Boundary Ford Curling Classic, however they would lose the quarterfinal to Edmonton's Tiffany Odegard. The team qualified for the 2012 Scotties Tournament of Hearts. At the 2012 event, things would start off well, with Galusha winning the 2012 Ford Hot Shots, and the team starting off with a 2-1 record in the first three games. After catching the flu, which was heavily circulating amongst all teams, Galusha would miss two games, one of which found Miller sitting out with the flu. This left three players on the ice. M.Cormier threw the first three stones, Barbour threw the next three stones, and S.Cormier threw the final two skip stones. The team could not recover from Galusha's absence and would finish round robin with a 4-7 record. Although the team finished with a disappointing record, it would mark a first occasion for Miller defeating the defending champions, Team Canada (Amber Holland) during round robin. Marking the fourth time in history, a team from the Territories would achieve this. They would also defeat the eventual champions, Team Alberta's Heather Nedohin.
