= Sharon Cormier =

Canadian curler (born 1964)

- Curler
- Born: July 8, 1964 (age 62); Regina, Saskatchewan

Team
- Curling club: Yellowknife CC, Yellowknife, NT
- Skip: Sharon Cormier
- Fourth: Reese Wainman
- Third: Alex Testart-Campbell
- Second: Brooke Smith
- Alternate: Tamara Bain

Curling career
- Member Association: Northwest Territories
- Hearts: 13 (1993, 1997, 1998, 2002, 2003, 2009, 2010, 2011, 2012, 2013, 2015, 2016, 2017)
- Top CTRS ranking: 40th (2011–12)

Sharon Cormier (born July 8, 1964, in Regina, Saskatchewan) is a Canadian curler from Yellowknife, Northwest Territories.

== Curling career ==
=== 1980–2000 ===
Cormier has had National curling experience at both the 1980 and 1981 Canadian Junior Curling Championship, as well as the 1986 Canadian Mixed Championship. Her first Scott appearance was the 1993 Scott Tournament of Hearts, playing third for Kelly Kaylo, where the team finished with a round robin record of 4–7. She would return to her Second Scott in 1997, playing for Kaylo, where the team would finish 4–7. They would return again in 1998 finishing 5–6.

=== 2000–2011 ===
Cormier would return in 2002, playing for Monique Gagnier, and 2003, playing for Dawn Moses, where she finished 4-7 and 2–9. Cormier's next appearance would be in 2009 as an alternate for Kerry Galusha’s team, where the territories made history, being the first team from the Northwest Territories to beat the defending champions. It was the second time a team representing the Northwest Territories/Yukon would defeat a defending champion. This victory over team Canada earn the Galusha team the 2009 Sport North Team of the Year Award. That year Galusha's team finished 4–7. In 2010 Cormier would have her own success when she put a team together, winning the 2010 NWT/Yukon Scotties Tournament of Hearts this time skipping her team. She would once again defeat the defending champions at the 2010 Scotties Tournament of Hearts, however her team would finish 4–7 in round robin play. Cormier once again represented the Territories in 2011 as an alternate for Galusha. The team would finish round robin with a 3–8 record.

=== 2011–current ===
For the 2011–12 season Cormier along with her daughter Megan, teamed up with Galusha. During the World Curling Tour, they defeated defending Canadian champion Amber Holland, and Olympic Silver Medallist Cheryl Bernard, and for the first time qualified for the playoffs during a tour event. They advanced to the playoffs at the 2011 Boundary Ford Curling Classic, however they would lose the quarterfinal to Edmonton's Tiffany Odegard. The team qualified for the 2012 Scotties Tournament of Hearts. At the 2012 event things would start off well the team out of the north. Galusha won the 2012 Ford Hot Shots, and started the event off with a 2–1 record in the first three games. After catching the flu, which was heavily circulating amongst all teams, Galusha would miss two games, one of which found second Wendy Miller sitting out with the flu, leaving Cormier to skip, Megan Cormier and Shona Barbour throwing three rocks each, with one sweeper. The team could not recover from Galusha's absence and would finish round robin with a 4–7 record. Although the team finished with a disappointing record, it would mark a third occasion for Cormier defeating the defending champions, Team Canada (Amber Holland) during round robin. Marking the fourth time in history, a team from the Territories would achieve this. They would also defeat the eventual champions, Team Alberta's Heather Nedohin. The team returned to the Scotties once again in 2013. At the 2013 Scotties Tournament of Hearts, they would finish with a 2–9 record, but once again defeated the defending champion along the way, when they beat Nedohin for the second straight year. The team returned to the Scotties in 2014 and 2015 with Sharon attending as the alternate but were defeated both years in the relegation round. Sharon joined Team Galusha again in 2017 throwing leads rocks but holding the broom for Galusha. The team was successful this time in making it through the relegation round and went on to put forward their best record at a Scotties finishing with a 5–6 record.

== Personal life ==
Cormier is married and is the mother of teammate Megan Koehler and son Joshua Cormier. She works as a finance and administration manager for Department of Infrastructure in the Northwest Territories government.
