= Northwest Territories Men's Curling Championship =

Canadian territorial curling championship

The Northwest Territories Men's Curling Championship is the men's territorial championship for men's curling in the Northwest Territories. Beginning in 2015, the event serves as a direct qualifier to the Tim Hortons Brier, Canada's national men's curling championships. Prior to 2015, the event served as a qualifier for the Yukon/NWT Men's Curling Championship.

== Winners (2015-present) ==
Event	Winning Team	Winning Club	City	Runner-up team	Host	Brier rec.
2026	Jamie Koe, Glen Kennedy, Roland Robinson, Shadrach McLeod	Yellowknife Curling Centre	Yellowknife	Aaron Bartling, D'arcy Delorey, Norman Bassett, Eric Preston	Yellowknife	13th (2–6)
2025	Aaron Bartling, D'arcy Delorey, Norman Bassett, Eric Preston	Hay River Curling Club	Hay River	Jamie Koe, Glen Kennedy, David Aho, Shadrach McLeod	Hay River	17th (0–8)
2024	Jamie Koe, Glen Kennedy (DNP), Cole Parsons, Shadrach Mcleod	Yellowknife Curling Centre	Yellowknife	Nick Saturnino, Mark Robertson, Stephen Robertson, Grant Convey	Inuvik	6th (5–4)
2023	Jamie Koe, Glen Kennedy, Cole Parsons, Shadrach Mcleod	Yellowknife Curling Centre	Yellowknife	Greg Skauge, Tom Naugler, Brad Patzer, Robert Borden	Fort Smith	16th (1–7)
2022	Jamie Koe, Glen Kennedy, Cole Parsons, Shadrach Mcleod	Yellowknife Curling Centre	Yellowknife	Greg Skauge, Tom Naugler, Brad Patzer, Robert Borden	Yellowknife	15th (1–7)
2021	Greg Skauge, Tom Naugler, Brad Patzer, Robert Borden	Yellowknife Curling Centre	Yellowknife	Glen Hudy, Brian Kelln, Franz Dziuba, Richard Klakowich	Yellowknife	15th (2–6)
2020	Jamie Koe, David Aho, Shadrach Mcleod, Cole Parsons	Yellowknife Curling Club	Yellowknife	Glen Hudy, Brian Kelln, Franz Dziuba, Richard Klakowich	Hay River	13th (2-5)
2019	Jamie Koe, David Aho, Matthew Ng, Cole Parsons	Yellowknife Curling Club	Yellowknife	Greg Skauge, Tom Naugler, Brad Patzer, Jim Sosiak	Yellowknife	T-13th (1-6)
2018	Jamie Koe, Chris Schille, Brad Chorostkowski, Robert Borden	Yellowknife Curling Club	Yellowknife	David Aho, Cole Parsons, Brett Zubot, Steve Moss (skip)	Inuvik	9th (4-4)
2017	Jamie Koe, Chris Schille, Brad Chorostkowski, Robert Borden	Yellowknife Curling Club	Yellowknife	Kevin Whitehead, Chris Haichert, David Aho, Steve Moss	Yellowknife	12th (1-10)
2016	Jamie Koe, Chris Schille, Brad Chorostkowski, Robert Borden	Yellowknife Curling Club	Yellowknife	Greg Skauge, Tom Naugler, Brad Patzer, Jim Sosiak	Hay River	9th (3-8)
2015	Jamie Koe, Mark Whitehead, Brad Chorostkowski, Robert Borden	Yellowknife Curling Club	Yellowknife	Steve Moss, Ron Delmage, Brett Zubot, Matthew Miller	Inuvik	12th (0-11)

== Winners (up to 2014) ==
Event	Winning Team
2014	Jamie Koe, Kevin Whitehead, Brad Chorostkowski, Robert Borden
2013	Jamie Koe, Tom Naugler, Brad Chorostkowski, Robert Borden
2012	Steve Moss, Brad Patzer, Cory Vanthuyne, Trevor Moss
2011	Jamie Koe, Tom Naugler, Brad Chorostkowski, Martin Gavin
2010	Jamie Koe, Kevin Whitehead, Brad Chorostkowski, Martin Gavin
2009	Jamie Koe, Jon Solberg, Brad Chorostkowski, Martin Gavin
