= 2017 Northwest Territories Men's Curling Championship =

- Host city: Yellowknife, Northwest Territories
- Arena: Yellowknife Curling Centre
- Dates: January 19–22
- Winner: Jamie Koe
- Curling club: Yellowknife Curling Centre
- Skip: Jamie Koe
- Third: Chris Schille
- Second: Brad Chorostkowski
- Lead: Robert Borden
- Finalist: Kevin Whitehead

The 2017 Northwest Territories Men's Curling Championship was held from January 19 to 22 at the Yellowknife Curling Centre in Yellowknife. The winning Jamie Koe team represented the Northwest Territories at the 2017 Tim Hortons Brier in St. John's, Newfoundland and Labrador.

== Teams ==
The teams are listed as follows:

Skip	Third	Second	Lead	Club
Jim Lockhart	Craig Browne	Jeff Clubine	Frank Lepine	Fort Smith Curling Club, Fort Smith
Jamie Koe	Chris Schille	Brad Chorostkowski	Robert Borden	Yellowknife Curling Club, Yellowknife
Kevin Whitehead	Chris Haichert	David Aho	Steve Moss	Yellowknife Curling Club, Yellowknife
Greg Skauge	Tom Naugler	Brad Patzer	Jim Sosiak	Yellowknife Curling Club, Yellowknife

== Round-robin standings ==
Key
Champions

Skip	W	L
Koe	6	0
Whitehead	4	2
Skauge	2	4
Lockhart	0	6

== Round-robin results ==
Draw 1

- Skauge 14-1 Lockhart
- Koe 7-6 Whitehead

Draw 2

- Koe 11-2 Lockhart
- Whitehead 7-5 Skauge

Draw 3

- Whitehead 15-0 Lockhart
- Koe 10-9 Skauge

Draw 4

- Koe 9-2 Skauge
- Whitehead 8-2 Lockhart

Draw 5

- Koe 9-2 Lockhart
- Whitehead 7-6 Skauge

Draw 6

- Skauge 5-0 Lockhart
- Koe 9-4 Whitehead
