= 2018 Northwest Territories Men's Curling Championship =

- Host city: Inuvik, Northwest Territories
- Arena: Inuvik Curling Club
- Dates: February 6–10
- Winner: Team Jamie Koe
- Curling club: Yellowknife Curling Club
- Skip: Jamie Koe
- Third: Chris Schille
- Second: Brad Chorostkowski
- Lead: Robert Borden
- Finalist: Team Stephen Moss

The 2018 Northwest Territories Men's Curling Championship was played February 6–10 at the Inuvik Curling Club in Inuvik. The winning Jamie Koe team represented the Northwest Territories at the 2018 Tim Hortons Brier in Regina.

== Teams ==
The teams are listed as follows:

Skip	Third	Second	Lead	Club
Glen Hudy	Brian Kelln	Franz Dziuba	Richard Klakowich	Yellowknife Curling Club, Yellowknife
Jamie Koe	Chris Schille	Brad Chorostkowski	Robert Borden	Yellowknife Curling Club, Yellowknife
David Aho	Cole Parsons	Brett Zubot	Stephen Moss (Skip)	Yellowknife Curling Club, Yellowknife
Justin Pascal	Sigmore Furlong	Tyler Bain	Tyler St. Louis	Inuvik Curling Club, Inuvik
Mark Robertson	Donovan Arey	Kevin McLeod	Nicolas Crocker	Inuvik Curling Club, Inuvik
Nick Saturnino	D'arcy Delorey	Andrew Dunbar	Kyle Gee	Inuvik Curling Club, Inuvik
Mel Sittichinli	Georgie Greenland	Ed Maring	Hans Lennie	Inuvik Curling Club, Inuvik
Greg Skauge	Tom Naugler	Brad Patzer	Jim Sosiak	Yellowknife Curling Club, Yellowknife

== A Event ==
First Knockout		A Semifinals		A Final
Hudy	7
Robertson	8	Robertson	3
Sittichinli	3	Koe	5
Koe	12			Koe	8
Pascal	1			Moss	5
Moss	11	Moss	8
Skauge	8	Skauge	7
Saturnino	5

== B Event ==
Second Knockout
Sittichinli	3
Hudy	12
Pascal	4
Saturnino	11

Quarterfinals
Hudy	14
Skauge	3
Saturnino	8
Robertson	2

B Semifinals
Hudy	3
Saturnino	5

B Final
Saturnino	2
Moss	8

== C Event ==
C Semifinal			C Final
			1	Hudy	8
2	Sittichinli	10		Sittichinli	7
3	Robertson	5

C Semifinal			C Final
			1	Saturnino	5
2	Pascal	1		Skauge	4
3	Skauge	9

== Playoffs ==
Page playoff system
A	Jamie Koe	10
B	Stephen Moss	2
C1	Glen Hudy	6
C2	Nick Saturnino	8

Semifinal
B	Stephen Moss	10
C2	Nick Saturnino	3

Final
A	Jamie Koe	9
B	Stephen Moss	3

=== A vs B ===
Saturday, February 10, 19:00

Sheet 1	1	2	3	4	5	6	7	8	9	10	Final
Jamie Koe	2	0	0	2	1	1	4	X	X	X	10
Stephen Moss	0	2	0	0	0	0	0	X	X	X	2

=== C1 Vs C2 ===
Saturday, February 10, 19:00

Team	1	2	3	4	5	6	7	8	9	10	Final
Glen Hudy	1	1	0	1	0	2	1	0	0	0	6
Nick Saturnino	0	0	2	0	1	0	0	2	2	1	8

=== Semifinal ===
Sunday, February 11, 09:00

Team	1	2	3	4	5	6	7	8	9	10	Final
Stephen Moss	2	0	1	1	0	1	0	5	X	X	10
Nick Saturnino	0	1	0	0	1	0	1	0	X	X	3

=== Final ===
Sunday, February 11, 14:00

Team	1	2	3	4	5	6	7	8	9	10	Final
Jamie Koe	3	0	0	2	4	0	X	X	X	X	9
Stephen Moss	0	1	1	0	0	1	X	X	X	X	3
