= 2016 Northwest Territories Men's Curling Championship =

- Host city: Hay River, Northwest Territories
- Arena: Hay River Curling Club
- Dates: January 27–31
- Winner: Team Jamie Koe
- Curling club: Yellowknife Curling Centre
- Skip: Jamie Koe
- Third: Chris Schille
- Second: Brad Chorostkowski
- Lead: Robert Borden
- Finalist: Greg Skauge

The 2016 Northwest Territories Men's Curling Championship was held from January 27 to 31 at the Hay River Curling Club in Hay River. The winning Jamie Koe team represented the Northwest Territories at the 2016 Tim Hortons Brier in Ottawa.

== Teams ==
The teams are listed as follows:

Skip	Third	Second	Lead	Alternate	Club
Bruce McArthur	Nick Kaeser	Craig Browne	Robert Mills		Fort Smith Curling Club, Fort Smith
D'arcy Delorey	Darcy Moshenko	Bruce Powder	Glenn Smith		Hay River Curling Club, Hay River
Paul Delorey	Jack MacKinnon	Gary Stoby	Dallas Weaver		Hay River Curling Club, Hay River
Glen Hudy	Brian Kelln	Ben McDonald	Rich Klakowich		Yellowknife Curling Club, Yellowknife
Jamie Koe	Chris Schille	Brad Chorostkowski	Robert Borden		Yellowknife Curling Club, Yellowknife
Stephen Moss	Michael Moss	Brett Zubot	Chris Kelln	Matthew Miller	Yellowknife Curling Club, Yellowknife
Greg Skauge	Tom Naugler	Brad Patzer	Jim Sosiak		Yellowknife Curling Club, Yellowknife

== Round-robin standings ==
Key
Teams to Final

Skip	W	L
Koe	6	0
Skauge	5	1
Moss	4	2
P. Delorey	3	3
Hudy	2	4
D. Delorey	1	5
McArthur	0	6

== Round-robin results ==
=== January 27 ===
Draw 1

- P. Delorey 6-4 McArthur
- Koe 10-2 D. Delorey
- Moss 19-9 Hudy

Draw 2

- Hudy 10-2 D. Delorey
- Skauge 6-5 Moss
- Koe 9-3 P. Delorey

=== January 28 ===
Draw 3

- Moss 10-4 McArthur
- P. Delorey 6-5 Hudy
- Skauge 8-4 D. Delorey

Draw 4

- Skauge 10-5 P. Delorey
- D. Delorey 8-6 McArthur
- Koe 9-3 Moss

=== January 29 ===
Draw 5

- Moss 10-2 D. Delorey
- Koe 9-3 Hudy
- Skauge 8-2 McArthur

Draw 6

- Koe 5-4 Skauge
- Moss 10-2 P. Delorey
- Hudy 7-5 McArthur

=== January 30 ===
Draw 7

- Skauge 9-2 Hudy
- Koe 8-4 McArthur
- P. Delorey 10-8 D. Delorey

== Final ==
- Koe must be beaten twice

Sunday, January 31, 1:00 pm

Team	1	2	3	4	5	6	7	8	9	10	Final
Jamie Koe	3	0	0	1	0	2	0	0	2	X	8
Greg Skauge	0	0	1	0	1	0	0	1	0	X	3
