= 2015 Northwest Territories Men's Curling Championship =

- Host city: Inuvik, Northwest Territories
- Arena: Inuvik Curling Club
- Dates: February 4–8
- Winner: Team Jamie Koe
- Curling club: Yellowknife CC, Yellowknife
- Skip: Jamie Koe
- Third: Mark Whitehead
- Second: Brad Chorostkowski
- Lead: Robert Borden
- Alternate: Bill Merklinger
- Finalist: Stephen Moss

The 2015 Northwest Territories Men's Curling Championship was held from February 4 to 8 at the Inuvik Curling Club in Inuvik, Northwest Territories. It was the first territorial men's championship to be held since the Northwest Territories gained a direct entry to the Brier, Canada's national men's curling championship. Prior to 2015, the top two teams in the territory played in the Yukon/NWT Men's Curling Championship, with the winner going to the Brier. The winning team represented the Northwest Territories at the 2015 Tim Hortons Brier in Calgary.

== Teams ==
The teams are listed as follows:

Skip	Third	Second	Lead	Alternate	Club
Larry Greenland	Georgie Greenland	A. J. McDonald	Conrad Bourque	William Charlie	Inuvik Curling Club, Inuvik
Jamie Koe	Mark Whitehead	Brad Chorostkowski	Robert Borden	Bill Merklinger	Yellowknife Curling Club, Yellowknife
Dave McLeod	Donovan Arey	Mel Sittichinli	Richard Ross, Jr.	Yannick Gagnon	Inuvik Curling Club, Inuvik
Stephen Moss	Ron Delmage	Brett Zubot	Matthew Miller		Yellowknife Curling Club, Yellowknife
Nick Saturnino	Mark Robertson	Kevin McLeod	Gordie Kasook		Inuvik Curling Club, Inuvik
Greg Skauge	Tom Naugler	Brad Patzer	Jim Sosiak		Yellowknife Curling Club, Yellowknife

== Round-robin standings ==
Final round-robin standings

Key
Teams to Final

Skip	W	L
Jamie Koe (Yellowknife)	5	0
Stephen Moss (Yellowknife)	4	1
Greg Skauge (Yellowknife)	3	2
Dave McLeod (Inuvik)	2	3
Nick Saturnino (Inuvik)	1	4
Larry Greenland (Inuvik)	0	5

== Round-robin results ==
=== Draw 1 ===
Wednesday, February 4, 8:00 pm

Sheet A	1	2	3	4	5	6	7	8	9	10	Final
Larry Greenland	1	0	0	1	3	0	0	0	0	0	5
Nick Saturnino	0	1	0	0	0	1	1	1	1	1	6

Sheet B	1	2	3	4	5	6	7	8	9	10	Final
Jamie Koe	0	3	1	0	1	2	0	1	0	2	10
Greg Skauge	3	0	0	2	0	0	2	0	2	0	9

Sheet C	1	2	3	4	5	6	7	8	9	10	Final
Dave McLeod	0	1	0	1	0	1	0	0	X	X	3
Stephen Moss	4	0	1	0	1	0	2	2	X	X	10

=== Draw 2 ===
Thursday, February 5, 1:00 pm

Sheet A	1	2	3	4	5	6	7	8	9	10	Final
Dave McLeod	0	2	0	1	0	0	0	1	0	X	4
Jamie Koe	1	0	1	0	3	1	1	0	1	X	8

Sheet B	1	2	3	4	5	6	7	8	9	10	Final
Larry Greenland	1	0	1	3	0	0	2	0	1	0	8
Stephen Moss	0	3	0	0	2	1	0	3	0	1	10

Sheet C	1	2	3	4	5	6	7	8	9	10	Final
Nick Saturnino	0	0	2	2	0	2	0	0	0	X	6
Greg Skauge	1	1	0	0	1	0	1	3	1	X	8

=== Draw 3 ===
Thursday, February 5, 7:00 pm

Sheet A	1	2	3	4	5	6	7	8	9	10	Final
Greg Skauge	0	2	0	1	0	0	1	0	X	X	4
Stephen Moss	1	0	2	0	2	1	0	3	X	X	9

Sheet B	1	2	3	4	5	6	7	8	9	10	Final
Nick Saturnino	0	0	0	1	0	0	X	X	X	X	1
Jamie Koe	1	1	2	0	3	2	X	X	X	X	9

Sheet C	1	2	3	4	5	6	7	8	9	10	Final
Larry Greenland	1	0	0	0	1	0	X	X	X	X	2
Dave McLeod	0	4	1	1	0	3	X	X	X	X	9

=== Draw 4 ===
Friday, February 6, 10:00 am

Sheet A	1	2	3	4	5	6	7	8	9	10	Final
Stephen Moss	0	1	1	0	1	0	0	2	0	1	6
Nick Saturnino	0	0	0	1	0	1	1	0	1	0	4

Sheet B	1	2	3	4	5	6	7	8	9	10	Final
Greg Skauge	0	0	1	0	1	0	2	0	1	3	8
Dave McLeod	1	1	0	1	0	2	0	0	0	0	5

Sheet C	1	2	3	4	5	6	7	8	9	10	Final
Jamie Koe	0	0	0	2	0	5	0	0	1	1	9
Larry Greenland	1	0	2	0	3	0	1	0	0	0	7

=== Draw 5 ===
Friday, February 6, 3:00 pm

Sheet A	1	2	3	4	5	6	7	8	9	10	Final
Greg Skauge	1	3	0	0	0	1	X	X	X	X	5
Larry Greenland	0	0	1	1	1	0	X	X	X	X	3

Sheet B	1	2	3	4	5	6	7	8	9	10	Final
Dave McLeod	1	X	X	X	X	X	X	X	X	X	1
Nick Saturnino	0	X	X	X	X	X	X	X	X	X	0

Sheet C	1	2	3	4	5	6	7	8	9	10	Final
Stephen Moss	0	1	0	2	0	0	2	0	0	X	5
Jamie Koe	2	0	2	0	2	1	0	0	0	X	7

== Final ==
Saturday, February 7, 2:00 pm

Team	1	2	3	4	5	6	7	8	9	10	11	Final
Jamie Koe	1	1	0	0	1	1	0	0	0	0	1	5
Stephen Moss	0	0	0	1	0	0	0	0	1	2	0	4
