= 2016 Tim Hortons Brier =

- Host city: Ottawa, Ontario
- Arena: TD Place Arena
- Dates: March 5 – March 13
- Attendance: 115,047
- Winner: Alberta
- Curling club: The Glencoe Club, Calgary
- Skip: Kevin Koe
- Third: Marc Kennedy
- Second: Brent Laing
- Lead: Ben Hebert
- Alternate: Scott Pfeifer
- Coach: John Dunn
- Finalist: Newfoundland and Labrador (Brad Gushue)

The 2016 Tim Hortons Brier, Canada's national men's curling championship, was held from March 5–13, 2016 at TD Place Arena in Ottawa, Ontario.

It is the fourth time the Brier has been held in Ottawa, and the fifth time the Brier has been held in the Ottawa-Gatineau region. It is the first time the Brier has been held in Ottawa since the 2001 Nokia Brier.

Alberta won the Brier 9–5 in the final against Newfoundland and Labrador, giving skip Kevin Koe his third Brier title. With the win, the Koe rink represented Canada at the 2016 World Men's Curling Championship held from April 2–10, 2016 at St. Jakobshalle in Basel, Switzerland. They also represented Team Canada at the 2017 Tim Hortons Brier in St. John's, Newfoundland and Labrador and earned $225,000 for the victory. The bronze medal game was won by Northern Ontario.

The total attendance for the event was 115,047, down from the 154,136 that went to the last Brier held in Ottawa. The attendance for the final was a sellout of 8,419, which was standing-room only in the 8,200 seat arena.

== Broomgate ==
The Brier was held during the infamous "broomgate" season. Prior to the event, a "gentleman's agreement" was attempted at the instigation of Alberta lead Ben Hebert with the aim of stopping teams from swapping brooms among themselves, which had been an issue at that years Scotties Tournament of Hearts. There, some teams had swapped the skip's broom, as skips do less sweeping, and therefore would be fresher, and therefore more effective. However, the teams at the Brier could not come to an agreement, and so some teams took advantage of broom swapping, with Team Alberta themselves mastering the practice, helping them to win the event.

== Ice conditions ==
Toward the end of the week, ice conditions became poor, as warmer, wet weather descended upon the capital, creating a layer of frost on the ice. The arena lacked a dehumidifier which made the problem worse, as there was no way of removing the moisture in the air. Manitoba skip Mike McEwen claimed the ice was the "second-worst ice conditions he's ever played on". Conditions returned to normal for the final championship weekend.

== Teams ==
The 2016 Brier field has been considered by some to be among the best ever. The event features two Olympic champion skips, two World Champion skips, four Brier champion skips, and ten of the top 17 teams in the country (including six of the top ten in the world), according to the CTRS standings.

Coming off of a bronze medal showing at the 2015 Ford World Men's Curling Championship, the defending Brier champion Pat Simmons rink from Calgary returns to represent Team Canada. Also returning from the 2015 Brier is the 2010 World Champion Kevin Koe rink (also from Calgary), representing Alberta; 2014 Brier runner-up Jim Cotter representing British Columbia; 2006 Olympic Champion Brad Gushue and his Newfoundland and Labrador team; the 2014 Olympic champions Brad Jacobs representing Northern Ontario; 2009 Canadian Junior Champion Adam Casey and his Prince Edward Island team; 2006 Brier champion Jean-Michel Ménard skipping the Quebec team; 2003 World Junior Champion Steve Laycock and his Saskatchewan team; ten-time Territories champion Jamie Koe, representing the Northwest Territories; and four-time Territorial Champion Bob Smallwood representing the Yukon. The 2016 Brier also features four-time provincial champion Mike Kennedy skipping New Brunswick; Three-time provincial champion Jamie Murphy representing Nova Scotia; and Four-time World Champion Glenn Howard, who is making his Brier record 17th appearance at the national championships. Two teams are making their debut at the 2016 Brier. The World #2 ranked Mike McEwen rink who lost in five of the last six provincial championship finals, finally won the Manitoba championship, earning the right to represent Manitoba for the first time at the Brier. Also making their debut is Team Nunavut, skipped by Wade Kingdon. Nunavut was granted a direct entry to the Brier for the first time in 2015, but opted to field a team for the first time in 2016.

For the first time, Curling Canada is allowing each team to field a player from out of province. Players living outside the province or territory of their team includes Brent Laing of Alberta (lives in Ontario), Chris Schille of the Northwest Territories (lives in Alberta) and Ryan Fry of Northern Ontario (who lives in Ontario, but in Toronto). Also, Team Canada skip Pat Simmons lives in Saskatchewan, while the rest of his team lives in Alberta.

Canada	Alberta	British Columbia
The Glencoe Club, Calgary Skip: Pat Simmons; Third: John Morris; Second: Carter Rycroft; Lead: Nolan Thiessen; Alternate: Tom Sallows	The Glencoe Club, Calgary Skip: Kevin Koe; Third: Marc Kennedy; Second: Brent Laing; Lead: Ben Hebert; Alternate: Scott Pfeifer	Vernon CC, Vernon; Kelowna CC, Kelowna Skip: Jim Cotter; Third: Ryan Kuhn; Second: Tyrel Griffith; Lead: Rick Sawatsky; Alternate: Pat Ryan
Manitoba	New Brunswick	Newfoundland and Labrador
Fort Rouge CC, Winnipeg Skip: Mike McEwen; Third: B.J. Neufeld; Second: Matt Wozniak; Lead: Denni Neufeld; Alternate: Jon Mead	Grand Falls CC, Grand Falls Skip: Mike Kennedy; Third: Scott Jones; Second: Marc LeCocq; Lead: Jamie Brannen; Alternate: David Konefal	Bally Haly G&CC, St. John's Skip: Brad Gushue; Third: Mark Nichols; Second: Brett Gallant; Lead: Geoff Walker
Northern Ontario	Nova Scotia	Ontario
Community First CC, Sault Ste. Marie Skip: Brad Jacobs; Third: Ryan Fry; Second: E.J. Harnden; Lead: Ryan Harnden; Alternate: Lee Toner	Mayflower CC, Halifax Skip: Jamie Murphy; Third: Jordan Pinder; Second: Scott Saccary; Lead: Phil Crowell; Alternate: Alan Darragh	St. George's G&CC, Etobicoke Skip: Glenn Howard; Third: Richard Hart; Second: Adam Spencer; Lead: Scott Howard; Alternate: Joey Hart, Craig Savill (Note: As a special tribute, Savill was made an honorary coach of all the teams playing in Draw 16, and was allowed to throw two rocks in Team Ontario's final game. Savill had been forced to take time off from curling due to being diagnosed with cancer, but was allowed to play in the game.)
Prince Edward Island	Quebec	Saskatchewan
Silver Fox C&YC, Summerside; Charlottetown CC, Charlottetown Skip: Adam Casey; Third: David Mathers; Second: Anson Carmody; Lead: Robbie Doherty; Alternate: Ryan Giddens	CC Etchemin, Saint-Romuald; Mt. Bruno CC, Saint-Bruno-de-Montarville Skip: Jean-Michel Ménard; Third: Martin Crête; Second: Éric Sylvain; Lead: Philippe Ménard; Alternate: Pierre Charette	Nutana CC, Saskatoon Skip: Steve Laycock; Third: Kirk Muyres; Second: Colton Flasch; Lead: Dallan Muyres; Alternate: Gerry Adam
Northwest Territories	Nunavut	Yukon
Yellowknife CC, Yellowknife Skip: Jamie Koe; Third: Chris Schille; Second: Brad Chorostkowski; Lead: Robert Borden	Iqaluit CC, Iqaluit Skip: Wade Kingdon; Third: Dennis Masson; Second: Aaron Fraser; Lead: Bruce Morgan; Alternate: Chris West	Whitehorse CC, Whitehorse Skip: Bob Smallwood; Third: Jon Solbert; Second: Clint Abel; Lead: Scott Odian; Alternate: David Rach

=== CTRS ranking ===
Member Association (Skip)	Rank	Points
Newfoundland and Labrador (Gushue)	1	468.463
Alberta (K. Koe)	2	452.488
Manitoba (McEwen)	3	402.570
Saskatchewan (Laycock)	6	303.603
Northern Ontario (Jacobs)	7	275.950
Ontario (Howard)	8	238.723
British Columbia (Cotter)	11	217.124
Canada (Simmons)	12	154.806
Quebec (Ménard)	15	126.860
Nova Scotia (Murphy)	17	109.393
Prince Edward Island (Casey)	27	87.452
New Brunswick (Kennedy)	82	27.807
Northwest Territories (J. Koe)	135	7.207
Nunavut (Kingdon)	NR	0.000
Yukon (Smallwood)	NR	0.000

== Map of teams ==
Team Canada Provincial Winners

== Pre-qualifying tournament ==
The Northwest Territories rink won the pre-qualifying event, qualifying the team to play at the full Brier event round robin against the other 11 teams. Nova Scotia missed out in playing in the main event for the second straight year.

=== Standings ===
Locale	Skip	W	L	PF	PA	EW	EL	BE	SE	S%
Northwest Territories	Jamie Koe	3	0	26	12	15	10	3	5	86%
Nova Scotia	Jamie Murphy	2	1	32	11	15	9	3	4	84%
Yukon	Bob Smallwood	1	2	22	22	12	13	0	2	76%
Nunavut	Wade Kingdon	0	3	8	42	7	17	0	0	54%

=== Results ===
All draw times are listed in Eastern Standard Time (UTC−5).

==== Draw 1 ====
Thursday, March 3, 7:00 pm

Sheet C	1	2	3	4	5	6	7	8	9	10	Final
Nova Scotia (Murphy) 🔨	2	0	4	0	2	0	2	1	X	X	11
Yukon (Smallwood)	0	1	0	1	0	1	0	0	X	X	3

Sheet D	1	2	3	4	5	6	7	8	9	10	Final
Northwest Territories (J. Koe) 🔨	4	0	4	1	1	1	2	0	X	X	13
Nunavut (Kingdon)	0	1	0	0	0	0	0	1	X	X	2

==== Draw 2 ====
Friday, March 4, 7:30 am

Sheet A	1	2	3	4	5	6	7	8	9	10	Final
Northwest Territories (J. Koe)	0	1	0	0	2	0	0	2	0	1	6
Nova Scotia (Murphy) 🔨	1	0	0	1	0	0	1	0	2	0	5

Sheet B	1	2	3	4	5	6	7	8	9	10	Final
Nunavut (Kingdon)	0	0	0	1	0	2	0	1	X	X	4
Yukon (Smallwood) 🔨	3	2	4	0	4	0	1	0	X	X	14

==== Draw 3 ====
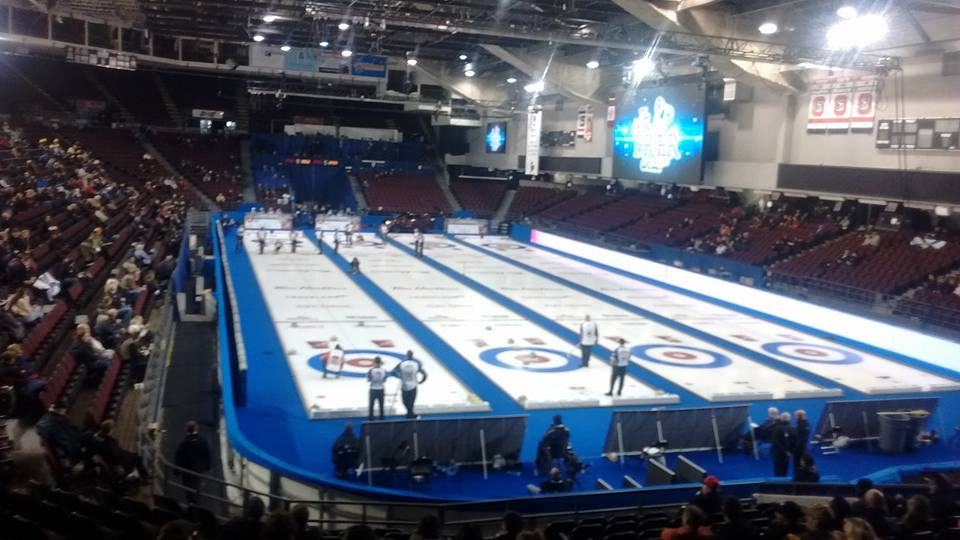
Draw 3 of the pre-qualifying matches

Friday, March 4, 4:20 pm

Sheet C	1	2	3	4	5	6	7	8	9	10	Final
Yukon (Smallwood) 🔨	1	0	2	0	1	0	1	0	0	X	5
Northwest Territories (J. Koe)	0	2	0	1	0	2	0	1	1	X	7

Sheet D	1	2	3	4	5	6	7	8	9	10	Final
Nunavut (Kingdon)	0	0	0	0	1	0	1	0	X	X	2
Nova Scotia (Murphy) 🔨	4	1	4	2	0	2	0	3	X	X	16

=== Pre-qualifying Final ===
Saturday, March 5, 2:30 pm

Sheet B	1	2	3	4	5	6	7	8	9	10	Final
Northwest Territories (J. Koe) 🔨	0	2	0	2	0	1	0	0	1	1	7
Nova Scotia (Murphy)	0	0	1	0	1	0	1	1	0	0	4

== Round-robin standings ==
Final round-robin standings

Key
Teams to Playoffs
Team relegated to 2017 Pre-qualifying Tournament

Locale	Skip	W	L	PF	PA	EW	EL	BE	SE	S%
Northern Ontario	Brad Jacobs	11	0	77	40	47	28	26	13	92%
Newfoundland and Labrador	Brad Gushue	9	2	66	50	42	38	27	9	91%
Alberta	Kevin Koe	8	3	78	50	43	35	21	5	92%
Manitoba	Mike McEwen	8	3	66	52	41	36	26	8	91%
Canada	Pat Simmons	6	5	61	62	37	35	30	9	88%
Saskatchewan	Steve Laycock	5	6	65	58	42	45	21	9	87%
Quebec	Jean-Michel Ménard	4	7	59	70	40	44	20	5	88%
Ontario	Glenn Howard	4	7	60	71	41	43	22	7	90%
Northwest Territories	Jamie Koe	3	8	65	76	43	50	24	5	83%
New Brunswick	Mike Kennedy	3	8	59	80	44	46	14	5	84%
British Columbia	Jim Cotter	3	8	60	73	39	48	15	2	86%
Prince Edward Island	Adam Casey	2	9	49	79	36	46	16	1	82%

== Round-robin results ==
All draw times are listed in Eastern Standard Time (UTC−5).

=== Draw 1 ===
Saturday, March 5, 2:30 pm

Sheet A	1	2	3	4	5	6	7	8	9	10	11	Final
Newfoundland and Labrador (Gushue)	0	0	2	0	0	2	0	0	0	0	1	5
Manitoba (McEwen) 🔨	1	0	0	1	1	0	0	0	0	1	0	4

Sheet C	1	2	3	4	5	6	7	8	9	10	Final
Canada (Simmons) 🔨	0	2	0	1	1	1	0	0	2	X	7
Quebec (Ménard)	0	0	1	0	0	0	0	1	0	X	2

Sheet D	1	2	3	4	5	6	7	8	9	10	11	Final
Ontario (Howard)	0	1	0	0	0	2	0	1	0	0	1	5
Alberta (K. Koe) 🔨	1	0	2	0	0	0	0	0	0	1	0	4

=== Draw 2 ===
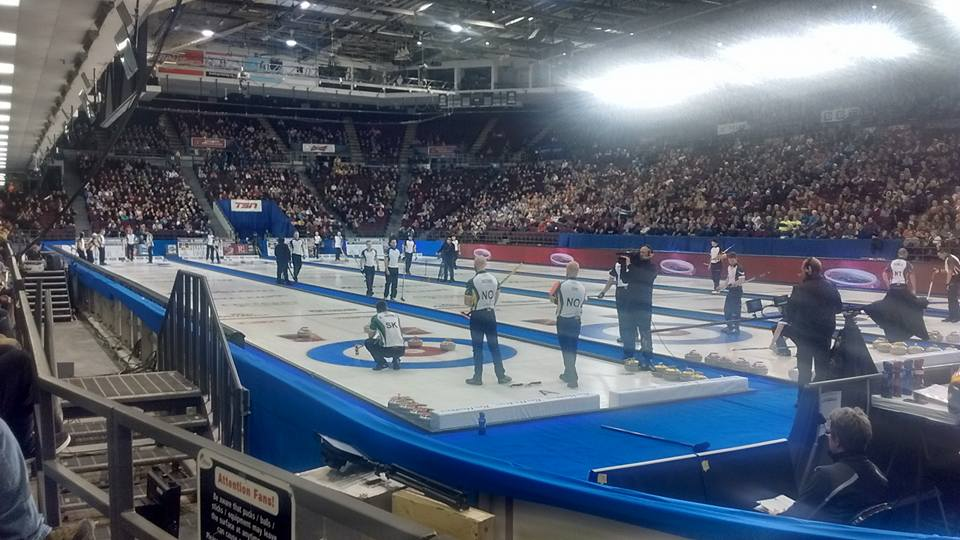
Draw 2 action; Northern Ontario versus Saskatchewan in the foreground

Saturday, March 5, 7:30 pm

Sheet A	1	2	3	4	5	6	7	8	9	10	11	Final
Northern Ontario (Jacobs) 🔨	0	0	2	0	0	2	0	0	1	0	1	6
Saskatchewan (Laycock)	1	0	0	1	0	0	0	2	0	1	0	5

Sheet B	1	2	3	4	5	6	7	8	9	10	Final
Prince Edward Island (Casey) 🔨	1	0	0	1	0	1	0	1	0	X	4
British Columbia (Cotter)	0	2	1	0	1	0	3	0	1	X	8

Sheet C	1	2	3	4	5	6	7	8	9	10	11	Final
Northwest Territories (J. Koe) 🔨	0	1	0	1	0	0	1	0	2	1	0	6
New Brunswick (Kennedy)	0	0	2	0	2	1	0	1	0	0	1	7

=== Draw 3 ===
Sunday, March 6, 9:00 am

Sheet A	1	2	3	4	5	6	7	8	9	10	Final
Alberta (K. Koe) 🔨	2	0	0	2	0	3	0	3	X	X	10
New Brunswick (Kennedy)	0	1	0	0	2	0	1	0	X	X	4

Sheet B	1	2	3	4	5	6	7	8	9	10	Final
Saskatchewan (Laycock)	0	0	0	0	0	2	0	2	0	0	4
Canada (Simmons) 🔨	0	2	1	0	0	0	1	0	0	1	5

Sheet C	1	2	3	4	5	6	7	8	9	10	Final
Ontario (Howard)	0	0	0	1	0	0	0	1	X	X	2
Manitoba (McEwen) 🔨	0	1	0	0	2	0	3	0	X	X	6

Sheet D	1	2	3	4	5	6	7	8	9	10	11	Final
Quebec (Ménard)	0	0	2	0	1	0	0	0	0	1	0	4
Northern Ontario (Jacobs) 🔨	0	2	0	1	0	0	0	0	1	0	1	5

=== Draw 4 ===
Sunday, March 6, 2:00 pm

Sheet A	1	2	3	4	5	6	7	8	9	10	Final
Northwest Territories (J. Koe)🔨	0	0	0	0	2	0	1	0	0	X	3
Canada (Simmons)	2	0	0	0	0	2	0	2	0	X	6

Sheet B	1	2	3	4	5	6	7	8	9	10	11	Final
Newfoundland and Labrador (Gushue)🔨	0	0	0	1	0	1	0	0	0	1	0	3
Ontario (Howard)	0	0	0	0	1	0	2	0	0	0	1	4

Sheet C	1	2	3	4	5	6	7	8	9	10	Final
Alberta (K. Koe)🔨	0	2	0	2	0	1	0	5	X	X	10
Prince Edward Island (Casey)	0	0	2	0	1	0	1	0	X	X	4

Sheet D	1	2	3	4	5	6	7	8	9	10	Final
Saskatchewan (Laycock)	0	0	2	0	2	0	4	0	X	X	8
British Columbia (Cotter)🔨	0	1	0	1	0	1	0	1	X	X	4

=== Draw 5 ===
Sunday, March 6, 7:30 pm

Sheet A	1	2	3	4	5	6	7	8	9	10	Final
Prince Edward Island (Casey)🔨	0	0	0	0	1	0	0	1	0	X	2
Quebec (Ménard)	0	0	0	0	0	0	1	0	3	X	4

Sheet B	1	2	3	4	5	6	7	8	9	10	Final
Manitoba (McEwen)🔨	0	1	0	0	0	3	0	1	0	1	6
New Brunswick (Kennedy)	0	0	0	0	1	0	1	0	1	0	3

Sheet C	1	2	3	4	5	6	7	8	9	10	Final
Northern Ontario (Jacobs)🔨	1	1	0	0	1	1	0	0	1	X	5
British Columbia (Cotter)	0	0	0	2	0	0	0	1	0	X	3

Sheet D	1	2	3	4	5	6	7	8	9	10	Final
Newfoundland and Labrador (Gushue)	0	1	0	0	2	0	1	0	2	X	6
Northwest Territories (J. Koe)🔨	1	0	0	0	0	1	0	1	0	X	3

=== Draw 6 ===
Monday, March 7, 2:30 pm

Sheet A	1	2	3	4	5	6	7	8	9	10	Final
Ontario (Howard)	0	1	0	1	0	1	0	2	0	0	5
British Columbia (Cotter) 🔨	0	0	2	0	1	0	3	0	1	2	9

Sheet B	1	2	3	4	5	6	7	8	9	10	11	Final
Northwest Territories (J. Koe)	0	3	0	1	0	2	0	0	0	1	0	7
Alberta (K. Koe) 🔨	2	0	2	0	1	0	0	2	0	0	1	8

Sheet C	1	2	3	4	5	6	7	8	9	10	Final
Saskatchewan (Laycock) 🔨	2	0	0	2	0	1	0	0	0	X	5
Newfoundland and Labrador (Gushue)	0	1	1	0	1	0	3	0	1	X	7

Sheet D	1	2	3	4	5	6	7	8	9	10	Final
Canada (Simmons)	0	0	0	2	0	0	0	1	1	0	4
Prince Edward Island (Casey) 🔨	0	2	0	0	0	1	1	0	0	2	6

=== Draw 7 ===
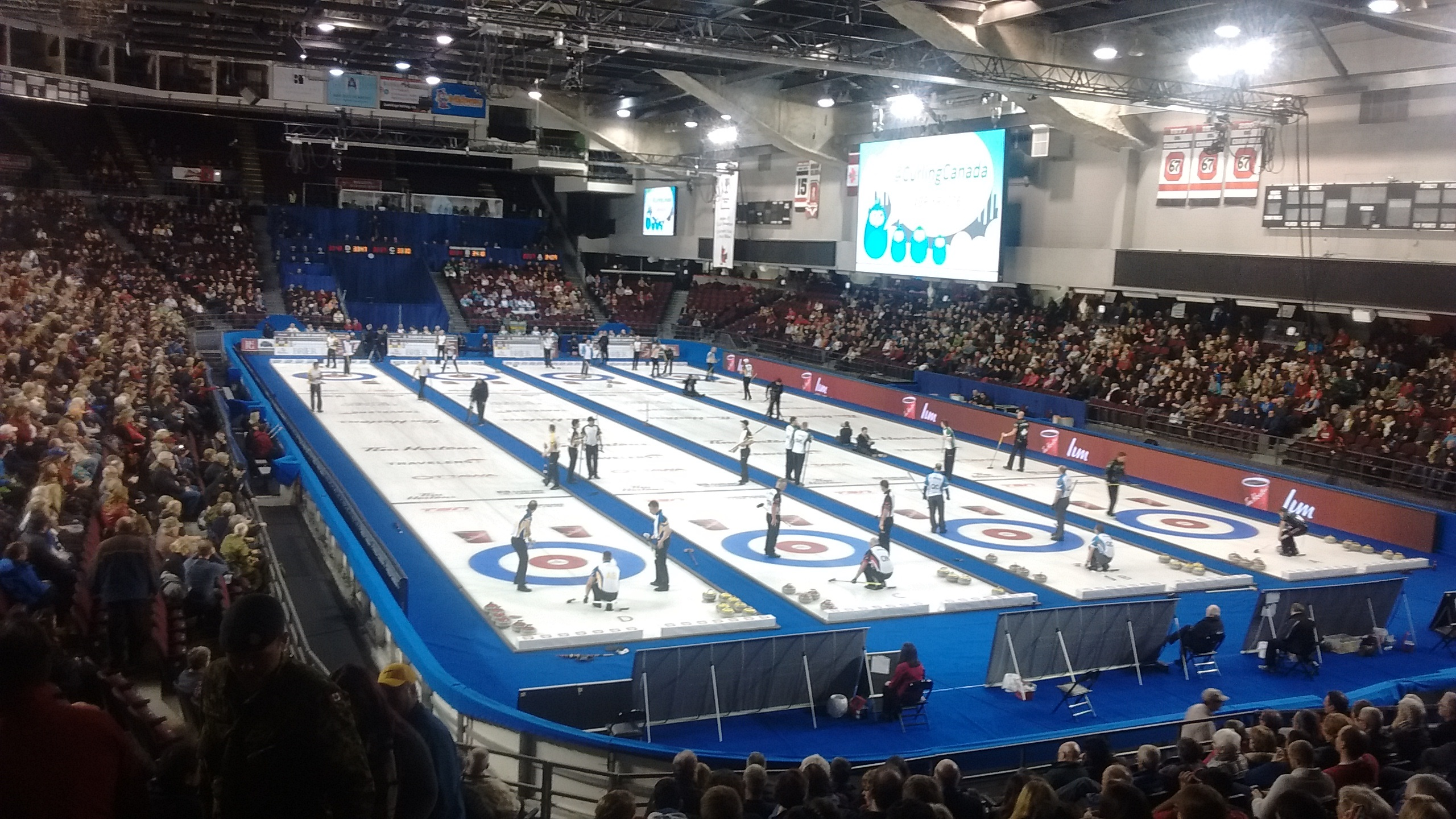
Draw 7 action.

Monday, March 7, 7:30 pm

Sheet A	1	2	3	4	5	6	7	8	9	10	Final
Canada (Simmons) 🔨	3	0	0	1	0	2	0	0	X	X	6
Northern Ontario (Jacobs)	0	4	1	0	1	0	3	1	X	X	10

Sheet B	1	2	3	4	5	6	7	8	9	10	Final
Quebec (Ménard)	0	1	0	2	0	0	0	0	0	X	3
Saskatchewan (Laycock) 🔨	0	0	1	0	0	0	2	3	1	X	7

Sheet C	1	2	3	4	5	6	7	8	9	10	Final
New Brunswick (Kennedy)	0	1	0	0	1	0	2	0	2	0	6
Ontario (Howard) 🔨	2	0	2	1	0	1	0	2	0	1	9

Sheet D	1	2	3	4	5	6	7	8	9	10	Final
Alberta (K. Koe) 🔨	2	0	0	4	0	2	0	1	X	X	9
Manitoba (McEwen)	0	1	0	0	1	0	2	0	X	X	4

=== Draw 8 ===
Tuesday, March 8, 9:30 am

Sheet A	1	2	3	4	5	6	7	8	9	10	11	Final
Manitoba (McEwen) 🔨	2	0	0	1	0	0	0	0	1	0	1	5
Northwest Territories (J. Koe)	0	2	0	0	1	0	0	0	0	1	0	4

Sheet B	1	2	3	4	5	6	7	8	9	10	Final
New Brunswick (Kennedy) 🔨	1	0	0	1	0	0	1	0	1	X	4
Newfoundland and Labrador (Gushue)	0	2	1	0	0	2	0	2	0	X	7

Sheet C	1	2	3	4	5	6	7	8	9	10	Final
Prince Edward Island (Casey)	0	0	1	0	0	0	0	1	0	X	2
Northern Ontario (Jacobs) 🔨	2	1	0	0	0	2	0	0	1	X	6

Sheet D	1	2	3	4	5	6	7	8	9	10	Final
British Columbia (Cotter) 🔨	0	1	0	1	0	1	0	0	2	0	5
Quebec (Ménard)	0	0	1	0	1	0	1	1	0	2	6

=== Draw 9 ===
Tuesday, March 8, 2:30 pm

Sheet A	1	2	3	4	5	6	7	8	9	10	Final
Saskatchewan (Laycock)	1	0	2	0	1	0	2	0	1	1	8
Prince Edward Island (Casey) 🔨	0	1	0	1	0	2	0	1	0	0	5

Sheet B	1	2	3	4	5	6	7	8	9	10	Final
British Columbia (Cotter) 🔨	2	0	0	0	1	0	0	1	0	X	4
Canada (Simmons)	0	0	0	5	0	1	0	0	2	X	8

Sheet C	1	2	3	4	5	6	7	8	9	10	Final
Newfoundland and Labrador (Gushue)	0	0	0	1	0	2	0	0	0	1	4
Alberta (K. Koe) 🔨	0	0	0	0	1	0	1	1	0	0	3

Sheet D	1	2	3	4	5	6	7	8	9	10	Final
Northwest Territories (J. Koe)	0	1	0	2	0	0	0	4	1	X	8
Ontario (Howard) 🔨	1	0	2	0	0	2	0	0	0	X	5

=== Draw 10 ===
Tuesday, March 8, 7:30 pm

Sheet A	1	2	3	4	5	6	7	8	9	10	Final
Quebec (Ménard) 🔨	2	0	1	0	1	0	2	0	3	X	9
Ontario (Howard)	0	1	0	2	0	1	0	1	0	X	5

Sheet B	1	2	3	4	5	6	7	8	9	10	Final
Alberta (K. Koe) 🔨	2	0	0	1	0	0	0	0	X	X	3
Northern Ontario (Jacobs)	0	0	4	0	0	2	1	1	X	X	8

Sheet C	1	2	3	4	5	6	7	8	9	10	Final
Manitoba (McEwen)	0	1	0	0	0	1	0	0	4	X	6
Canada (Simmons) 🔨	0	0	0	2	1	0	0	1	0	X	4

Sheet D	1	2	3	4	5	6	7	8	9	10	Final
New Brunswick (Kennedy)	0	0	2	0	1	1	0	2	0	1	7
Saskatchewan (Laycock) 🔨	0	1	0	2	0	0	0	0	3	0	6

=== Draw 11 ===
Wednesday, March 9, 9:30 am

Sheet A	1	2	3	4	5	6	7	8	9	10	Final
British Columbia (Cotter)	0	0	0	1	0	1	0	0	X	X	2
Alberta (K. Koe) 🔨	0	3	0	0	2	0	1	1	X	X	7

Sheet B	1	2	3	4	5	6	7	8	9	10	Final
Ontario (Howard)	1	0	1	3	0	2	2	0	X	X	9
Prince Edward Island (Casey) 🔨	0	2	0	0	1	0	0	1	X	X	4

Sheet C	1	2	3	4	5	6	7	8	9	10	11	Final
Northwest Territories (J. Koe)	1	0	0	0	1	0	0	0	0	2	0	4
Saskatchewan (Laycock) 🔨	0	0	0	1	0	1	0	1	1	0	1	5

Sheet D	1	2	3	4	5	6	7	8	9	10	Final
Newfoundland and Labrador (Gushue) 🔨	0	3	2	0	0	0	0	0	2	X	7
Canada (Simmons)	0	0	0	2	0	0	0	1	0	X	3

=== Draw 12 ===
Wednesday, March 9, 2:30 pm

Sheet A	1	2	3	4	5	6	7	8	9	10	Final
New Brunswick (Kennedy) 🔨	0	2	0	0	0	1	0	1	0	0	4
Canada (Simmons)	0	0	1	0	0	0	2	0	0	3	6

Sheet B	1	2	3	4	5	6	7	8	9	10	Final
Saskatchewan (Laycock)	0	0	1	0	1	1	0	1	1	0	5
Manitoba (McEwen) 🔨	2	1	0	1	0	0	1	0	0	1	6

Sheet C	1	2	3	4	5	6	7	8	9	10	Final
Alberta (K. Koe) 🔨	2	0	1	0	2	0	0	4	X	X	9
Quebec (Ménard)	0	1	0	2	0	1	0	0	X	X	4

Sheet D	1	2	3	4	5	6	7	8	9	10	Final
Ontario (Howard) 🔨	1	0	0	0	2	0	1	0	0	0	4
Northern Ontario (Jacobs)	0	0	0	1	0	1	0	3	0	1	6

=== Draw 13 ===
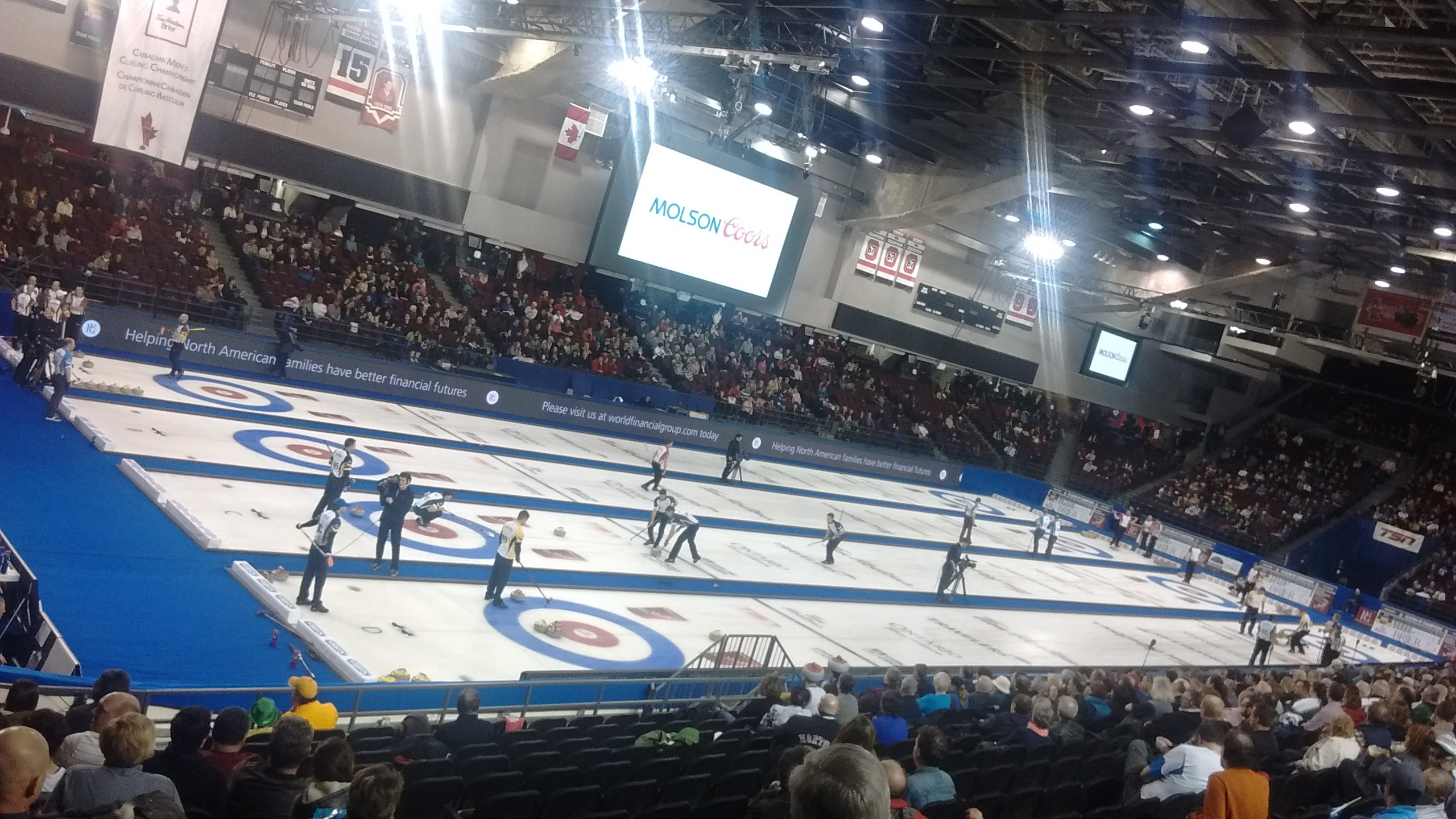
Draw 13 action.

Wednesday, March 9, 7:30 pm
With Northern Ontario's win over the Northwest Territories, they become the first team to clinch a playoff spot.

Sheet A	1	2	3	4	5	6	7	8	9	10	Final
Northwest Territories (J. Koe)	0	0	1	0	1	0	0	0	X	X	2
Northern Ontario (Jacobs) 🔨	2	3	0	3	0	0	1	0	X	X	9

Sheet B	1	2	3	4	5	6	7	8	9	10	Final
Newfoundland and Labrador (Gushue)	0	0	2	0	2	0	1	1	0	1	7
Quebec (Ménard) 🔨	1	2	0	1	0	1	0	0	1	0	6

Sheet C	1	2	3	4	5	6	7	8	9	10	Final
New Brunswick (Kennedy) 🔨	1	2	0	1	0	1	0	2	0	X	7
Prince Edward Island (Casey)	0	0	1	0	1	0	1	0	1	X	4

Sheet D	1	2	3	4	5	6	7	8	9	10	Final
Manitoba (McEwen)	0	0	0	2	0	0	3	1	2	X	8
British Columbia (Cotter) 🔨	2	0	0	0	0	1	0	0	0	X	3

=== Draw 14 ===
Thursday, March 10, 9:30 am
With their wins, both Alberta and Newfoundland and Labrador clinch playoff berths.

Sheet A	1	2	3	4	5	6	7	8	9	10	Final
Ontario (Howard)	0	0	0	1	0	2	0	0	1	0	4
Saskatchewan (Laycock) 🔨	0	0	2	0	2	0	0	2	0	1	7

Sheet B	1	2	3	4	5	6	7	8	9	10	Final
Canada (Simmons)	0	0	0	1	0	1	0	1	0	X	3
Alberta (K. Koe) 🔨	2	0	0	0	3	0	1	0	2	X	8

Sheet C	1	2	3	4	5	6	7	8	9	10	Final
British Columbia (Cotter)	0	3	0	1	0	0	1	0	2	0	7
Newfoundland and Labrador (Gushue) 🔨	2	0	1	0	2	1	0	1	0	1	8

Sheet D	1	2	3	4	5	6	7	8	9	10	Final
Prince Edward Island (Casey) 🔨	2	0	0	2	0	2	0	1	0	X	7
Northwest Territories (J. Koe)	0	1	0	0	2	0	1	0	0	X	4

=== Draw 15 ===
Thursday, March 10, 2:30 pm

Sheet A	1	2	3	4	5	6	7	8	9	10	Final
Prince Edward Island (Casey) 🔨	2	0	0	2	0	2	0	1	0	X	7
Newfoundland and Labrador (Gushue)	0	2	3	0	2	0	3	0	1	X	11

Sheet B	1	2	3	4	5	6	7	8	9	10	Final
British Columbia (Cotter) 🔨	1	0	0	3	0	0	2	0	2	0	8
Northwest Territories (J. Koe)	0	2	1	0	0	2	0	2	0	2	9

Sheet C	1	2	3	4	5	6	7	8	9	10	Final
Northern Ontario (Jacobs) 🔨	0	1	1	0	2	0	3	0	1	X	8
Manitoba (McEwen)	0	0	0	2	0	2	0	1	0	X	5

Sheet D	1	2	3	4	5	6	7	8	9	10	Final
New Brunswick (Kennedy) 🔨	0	1	0	2	0	2	0	2	0	X	7
Quebec (Ménard)	0	0	2	0	3	0	2	0	2	X	9

=== Draw 16 ===
Thursday, March 10, 7:30 pm
With Manitoba's win, they clinch the remaining playoff spot.

Sheet A	1	2	3	4	5	6	7	8	9	10	Final
Manitoba (McEwen) 🔨	0	1	0	0	0	2	0	4	1	0	8
Quebec (Ménard)	0	0	0	2	1	0	2	0	0	1	6

Sheet B	1	2	3	4	5	6	7	8	9	10	Final
Northern Ontario (Jacobs) 🔨	2	0	3	1	0	2	2	0	X	X	10
New Brunswick (Kennedy)	0	2	0	0	2	0	0	1	X	X	5

Sheet C	1	2	3	4	5	6	7	8	9	10	Final
Canada (Simmons)	0	0	0	1	0	3	0	1	2	2	9
Ontario (Howard) 🔨	0	2	1	0	1	0	4	0	0	0	8

Sheet D	1	2	3	4	5	6	7	8	9	10	Final
Saskatchewan (Laycock) 🔨	0	1	0	0	0	2	0	2	0	0	5
Alberta (K. Koe)	1	0	0	1	1	0	2	0	1	1	7

=== Draw 17 ===
Friday, March 11, 9:30 am
With Prince Edward Island losing and Northwest Territories winning, PEI will be relegated into the pre-qualifying tournament at the 2017 Tim Hortons Brier, as they have finished last.

Sheet A	1	2	3	4	5	6	7	8	9	10	Final
British Columbia (Cotter)	0	1	0	2	0	2	0	0	0	2	7
New Brunswick (Kennedy) 🔨	1	0	1	0	1	0	0	1	1	0	5

Sheet B	1	2	3	4	5	6	7	8	9	10	Final
Manitoba (McEwen) 🔨	1	0	0	2	2	0	0	3	X	X	8
Prince Edward Island (Casey)	0	2	0	0	0	0	1	0	X	X	3

Sheet C	1	2	3	4	5	6	7	8	9	10	Final
Quebec (Ménard)	1	0	1	0	1	0	0	2	0	1	6
Northwest Territories (J. Koe) 🔨	0	2	0	1	0	4	0	0	1	0	8

Sheet D	1	2	3	4	5	6	7	8	9	10	Final
Northern Ontario (Jacobs) 🔨	0	0	0	0	0	1	1	0	0	2	4
Newfoundland and Labrador (Gushue)	0	0	0	0	0	0	0	1	0	0	1

== Playoffs ==
Page playoff system
1	Northern Ontario	6
2	Newfoundland and Labrador	7
3	Alberta	7
4	Manitoba	5

Semifinal
1	Northern Ontario	5
3	Alberta	6

Final
2	Newfoundland and Labrador	5
3	Alberta	9

Bronze Medal Game
4	Manitoba	6
1	Northern Ontario	7

=== 1 vs. 2 ===
Friday, March 11, 7:30 pm

Sheet B	1	2	3	4	5	6	7	8	9	10	11	Final
Newfoundland and Labrador (Gushue)	0	0	1	0	0	2	2	0	1	0	1	7
Northern Ontario (Jacobs) 🔨	2	0	0	0	2	0	0	1	0	1	0	6

Player percentages
Newfoundland and Labrador		Northern Ontario	
Geoff Walker	97%	Ryan Harnden	95%
Brett Gallant	89%	E.J. Harnden	78%
Mark Nichols	93%	Ryan Fry	94%
Brad Gushue	89%	Brad Jacobs	80%
Total	92%	Total	87%

=== 3 vs. 4 ===
Saturday, March 12, 2:30 pm

Sheet B	1	2	3	4	5	6	7	8	9	10	Final
Manitoba (McEwen)	0	0	1	0	0	1	0	2	0	1	5
Alberta (K. Koe) 🔨	0	2	0	2	1	0	1	0	1	0	7

Player percentages
Manitoba		Alberta	
Denni Neufeld	99%	Ben Hebert	88%
Matt Wozniak	99%	Brent Laing	99%
B.J. Neufeld	81%	Marc Kennedy	93%
Mike McEwen	86%	Kevin Koe	91%
Total	91%	Total	93%

=== Semifinal ===
Saturday, March 12, 7:30 pm

Sheet B	1	2	3	4	5	6	7	8	9	10	Final
Alberta (K. Koe)	0	1	0	1	0	1	0	1	0	2	6
Northern Ontario (Jacobs)🔨	1	0	1	0	1	0	1	0	1	0	5

Player percentages
Alberta		Northern Ontario	
Ben Hebert	91%	Ryan Harnden	86%
Brent Laing	90%	E.J. Harnden	90%
Marc Kennedy	89%	Ryan Fry	78%
Kevin Koe	83%	Brad Jacobs	80%
Total	88%	Total	83%

=== Bronze medal game ===
Sunday, March 13, 2:30 pm

Sheet B	1	2	3	4	5	6	7	8	9	10	11	Final
Manitoba (McEwen)	2	0	0	0	0	2	0	0	0	2	0	6
Northern Ontario (Jacobs) 🔨	0	2	0	1	1	0	0	2	0	0	1	7

Player percentages
Manitoba		Northern Ontario	
Denni Neufeld	99%	Ryan Harnden	97%
Matt Wozniak	86%	E.J. Harnden	98%
B.J. Neufeld	88%	Ryan Fry	90%
Mike McEwen	84%	Brad Jacobs	91%
Total	89%	Total	94%

=== Final ===
Sunday, March 13, 7:30 pm

Sheet B	1	2	3	4	5	6	7	8	9	10	Final
Newfoundland and Labrador (Gushue) 🔨	0	0	1	0	1	1	0	2	0	X	5
Alberta (K. Koe)	1	1	0	2	0	0	3	0	2	X	9

Player percentages
Newfoundland and Labrador		Alberta	
Geoff Walker	100%	Ben Hebert	85%
Brett Gallant	94%	Brent Laing	100%
Mark Nichols	90%	Marc Kennedy	94%
Brad Gushue	81%	Kevin Koe	96%
Total	91%	Total	94%

== Statistics ==
=== Player percentages ===
After Round Robin

Leads	%
(Alberta) Ben Hebert	94.4
(Manitoba) Denni Neufeld	94.0
(Quebec) Philippe Ménard	93.2
(Northern Ontario) Ryan Harnden	92.0
(British Columbia) Rick Sawatsky	91.4
(Newfoundland and Labrador) Geoff Walker	91.3
(Ontario) Scott Howard	91.3
(Canada) Nolan Thiessen	89.7
(Saskatchewan) Dallan Muyres	89.4
(New Brunswick) Jamie Brannen	85.7
(Prince Edward Island) Robbie Doherty	85.7
(Northwest Territories) Robert Borden	85.2

Seconds	%
(Alberta) Brent Laing	92.7
(Northern Ontario) E.J. Harnden	92.3
(Ontario) Adam Spencer	91.2
(Newfoundland and Labrador) Brett Gallant	90.3
(British Columbia) Tyrel Griffith	90.0
(Saskatchewan) Colton Flasch	88.8
(Manitoba) Matt Wozniak	88.1
(Quebec) Éric Sylvain	88.0
(Canada) Carter Rycroft	85.9
(New Brunswick) Marc LeCocq	85.1
(Prince Edward Island) Anson Carmody	84.4
(Northwest Territories) Brad Chorostkowski	82.8

Thirds	%
(Northern Ontario) Ryan Fry	92.7
(Newfoundland and Labrador) Mark Nichols	91.9
(Alberta) Marc Kennedy	91.7
(Manitoba) B.J. Neufeld	91.4
(Ontario) Richard Hart	89.8
(Canada) John Morris	89.6
(Saskatchewan) Kirk Muyres	88.6
(Quebec) Martin Crête	86.6
(Northwest Territories) Chris Schille	84.6
(British Columbia) Ryan Kuhn	84.5
(New Brunswick) Scott Jones	82.3
(Prince Edward Island) David Mathers	80.5

Skips	%
(Northern Ontario) Brad Jacobs	92.8
(Newfoundland and Labrador) Brad Gushue	91.5
(Alberta) Kevin Koe	88.6
(Manitoba) Mike McEwen	88.7
(Canada) Pat Simmons	88.3
(Ontario) Glenn Howard	86.0
(Quebec) Jean-Michel Ménard	83.3
(Northwest Territories) Jamie Koe	82.9
(New Brunswick) Mike Kennedy	82.7
(Saskatchewan) Steve Laycock	82.5
(British Columbia) Jim Cotter	79.6
(Prince Edward Island) Adam Casey	79.5

=== Perfect games ===
Player	Team	Position	Shots	Opponent
Marc Kennedy	Alberta	Third	16	Prince Edward Island
Marc LeCocq	New Brunswick	Second	20	Manitoba
Philippe Ménard	Quebec	Lead	18	Saskatchewan
Scott Howard	Ontario	Lead	18	Northwest Territories
Glenn Howard	Ontario	Skip	16	Prince Edward Island
Nolan Thiessen	Canada	Lead	20	New Brunswick
E.J. Harnden	Northern Ontario	Second	16	Northwest Territories
Denni Neufeld	Manitoba	Lead	17	British Columbia
Kevin Koe	Alberta	Skip	18	Canada
Brett Gallant	Newfoundland and Labrador	Second	18	Prince Edward Island

== Awards ==
The awards and all-star teams are listed as follows:

All-Star Teams

First Team

- Skip: Brad Jacobs, Northern Ontario
- Third: Ryan Fry, Northern Ontario
- Second: Brent Laing, Alberta
- Lead: Denni Neufeld, Manitoba

Second Team

- Skip: Brad Gushue, Newfoundland and Labrador
- Third: Mark Nichols, Newfoundland and Labrador
- Second: E.J. Harnden, Northern Ontario
- Lead: Ben Hebert, Alberta

Ross Harstone Sportsmanship Award

- Tyrel Griffith, British Columbia second

Paul McLean Award

- Paul Wiecek, sports reporter for the Winnipeg Free Press

Hec Gervais Most Valuable Player Award

- Kevin Koe, Alberta skip

== Provincial and territorial playdowns ==
- 2016 Boston Pizza Cup (Alberta)
- (British Columbia) 2016 Canadian Direct Insurance BC Men's Curling Championship
- 2016 Viterra Championship (Manitoba)
- (New Brunswick) 2016 Pepsi Tankard
- 2016 Newfoundland and Labrador Tankard
- (Northern Ontario) 2016 Travelers Men's NOCA Provincials
- 2016 East Coast Credit Union Tankard (Nova Scotia)
- 2016 Ontario Tankard
- (Prince Edward Island) 2016 PEI Tankard
- 2016 WFG Tankard (Quebec)
- 2016 SaskTel Tankard (Saskatchewan)
- 2016 Northwest Territories Men's Curling Championship
- 2016 Yukon Men's Curling Championship
- 2016 Nunavut Brier Playdowns
