= 2025 Northwest Territories Men's Curling Championship =

- Host city: Hay River, Northwest Territories
- Arena: Hay River Curling Club
- Dates: January 30–February 2
- Winner: Team Bartling
- Curling club: Hay River CC, Hay River
- Skip: Aaron Bartling
- Third: D'arcy Delorey
- Second: Norman Bassett
- Lead: Eric Preston
- Finalist: Jamie Koe

The 2025 Northwest Territories Men's Curling Championship, the men's territorial curling championship for the Northwest Territories, was held from January 30 to February 2 at the Hay River Curling Club in Hay River, Northwest Territories. The winning Aaron Bartling rink will represent the Northwest Territories at the 2025 Montana's Brier in Kelowna, British Columbia.

With only three teams entering the event, the format will be a double round robin with a 3-team playoff.

== Teams ==
The teams are listed as follows:

Skip	Third	Second	Lead	Club
Aaron Bartling	D'arcy Delorey	Norman Bassett	Eric Preston	Hay River CC, Hay River
Jamie Koe	Glen Kennedy	David Aho	Shadrach McLeod	Yellowknife CC, Yellowknife
Greg Skauge	Tom Naugler	Brad Patzer	Adam Naugler	Yellowknife CC, Yellowknife

== Round robin standings ==
Final Round Robin Standings

Key
Team to Final
Teams to Semifinal

Skip	W	L	PF	PA	EW	EL	BE	SE	LSD
Jamie Koe	4	0	37	20	18	15	0	4	579.4
Aaron Bartling	1	3	24	28	16	17	1	4	333.2
Greg Skauge	1	3	22	35	14	16	3	3	546.1

== Round robin results ==
All draw times are listed in Mountain Standard Time (UTC−07:00).

=== Draw 1 ===
Thursday, January 30, 2:00 pm

Sheet 2	1	2	3	4	5	6	7	8	9	10	Final
Greg Skauge	0	0	1	0	0	2	0	X	X	X	3
Aaron Bartling	2	1	0	4	1	0	2	X	X	X	10

=== Draw 2 ===
Thursday, January 30, 7:30 pm

Sheet 2	1	2	3	4	5	6	7	8	9	10	Final
Greg Skauge	0	3	0	1	0	0	0	1	0	X	5
Jamie Koe	2	0	1	0	5	0	0	0	1	X	9

=== Draw 3 ===
Friday, January 31, 9:30 am

Sheet 2	1	2	3	4	5	6	7	8	9	10	Final
Aaron Bartling	0	2	0	1	0	0	0	1	0	X	4
Jamie Koe	1	0	2	0	3	1	0	0	2	X	9

=== Draw 4 ===
Friday, January 31, 3:00 pm

Sheet 3	1	2	3	4	5	6	7	8	9	10	Final
Aaron Bartling	2	0	0	0	1	0	0	2	0	X	5
Greg Skauge	0	2	1	1	0	0	1	0	3	X	8

=== Draw 5 ===
Saturday, February 1, 9:30 am

Sheet 3	1	2	3	4	5	6	7	8	9	10	Final
Greg Skauge	0	2	1	2	0	1	0	0	X	X	6
Jamie Koe	1	0	0	0	3	0	3	4	X	X	11

=== Draw 6 ===
Saturday, February 1, 3:00 pm

Sheet 3	1	2	3	4	5	6	7	8	9	10	Final
Aaron Bartling	1	0	1	0	0	1	0	1	1	0	5
Jamie Koe	0	1	0	1	1	0	2	0	0	3	8

== Playoffs ==
Semifinal			Final
			1	Jamie Koe	6
2	Aaron Bartling	6	2	Aaron Bartling	7
3	Greg Skauge	5

=== Semifinal ===
Sunday, February 2, 9:00 am

Sheet 2	1	2	3	4	5	6	7	8	9	10	Final
Aaron Bartling	1	0	2	0	0	2	0	0	0	1	6
Greg Skauge	0	1	0	0	1	0	2	1	0	0	5

=== Final ===
Sunday, February 2, 2:30 pm

Sheet 2	1	2	3	4	5	6	7	8	9	10	11	Final
Jamie Koe	1	0	2	0	1	0	1	1	0	0	0	6
Aaron Bartling	0	2	0	0	0	1	0	0	2	1	1	7

2025 Northwest Territories Men's Curling Championship
(Northwest Territories)
Aaron Bartling
1st Territorial Championship title
