= 2014 Yukon/NWT Men's Curling Championship =

- Host city: Whitehorse, Yukon
- Arena: Whitehorse Curling Club
- Dates: February 6–9
- Winner: Jamie Koe
- Curling club: Yellowknife Curling Club, Yellowknife
- Skip: Jamie Koe
- Third: Kevin Whitehead
- Second: Brad Chorostkowski
- Lead: Robert Borden
- Finalist: Pat Paslawski

The 2014 Yukon/NWT Men's Curling Championship, the men's curling championship for Yukon and the Northwest Territories, was held from February 6 to 9 at the Whitehorse Curling Club in Whitehorse, Yukon. The winning Jamie Koe rink from Yellowknife, Northwest Territories represented Yukon and the Northwest Territories at the 2014 Tim Hortons Brier in Kamloops.

== Teams ==
Skip	Third	Second	Lead	Territory
Pat Paslawski	Doug Hamilton	Alexander Peech	Trent Derkatch	Yukon
Wade Scoffin	Steve Fecteau	Mitchell Young	Clint Ireland	Yukon
Jamie Koe	Kevin Whitehead	Brad Chorostkowski	Robert Borden	Northwest Territories
Greg Skauge	Tom Naugler	Brad Patzer	Jim Sosiak	Northwest Territories

== Round robin standings ==
Final Round Robin Standings

Skip	W	L	PF	PA
Jamie Koe	6	0	47	24
Pat Paslawski	3	3	43	38
Wade Scoffin	2	4	33	43
Greg Skauge	1	5	27	45

== Round robin results ==
=== Draw 1 ===
Thursday, February 6, 6:30 pm

Sheet 5	1	2	3	4	5	6	7	8	9	10	Final
Pat Paslawski	0	1	0	4	1	0	1	2	0	0	9
Wade Scoffin	1	0	2	0	0	2	0	0	2	1	8

Sheet 6	1	2	3	4	5	6	7	8	9	10	Final
Jamie Koe	0	1	0	1	1	0	4	0	X	X	7
Greg Skauge	0	0	1	0	0	0	0	0	X	X	1

=== Draw 2 ===
Friday, February 7, 10:00 am

Sheet 7	1	2	3	4	5	6	7	8	9	10	Final
Wade Scoffin	0	1	0	0	0	1	1	0	X	X	3
Jamie Koe	4	0	1	0	0	0	0	4	X	X	9

Sheet 8	1	2	3	4	5	6	7	8	9	10	Final
Greg Skauge	1	0	2	0	0	0	1	3	0	X	7
Pat Paslawski	0	1	0	1	3	1	0	0	4	X	10

=== Draw 3 ===
Friday, February 7, 3:00 pm

Sheet 5	1	2	3	4	5	6	7	8	9	10	Final
Greg Skauge	3	0	1	0	0	0	0	0	X	X	4
Jamie Koe	0	3	0	1	2	0	0	2	X	X	8

Sheet 6	1	2	3	4	5	6	7	8	9	10	Final
Wade Scoffin	1	0	0	2	0	1	0	0	0	2	6
Pat Paslawski	0	1	1	0	1	0	0	0	1	0	4

=== Draw 4 ===
Saturday, February 8, 10:00 am

Sheet 7	1	2	3	4	5	6	7	8	9	10	Final
Jamie Koe	1	0	1	0	0	5	0	2	0	0	9
Pat Paslawski	0	2	0	2	1	0	2	0	1	0	8

Sheet 8	1	2	3	4	5	6	7	8	9	10	Final
Wade Scoffin	2	0	2	1	0	1	0	1	0	0	7
Greg Skauge	0	1	0	0	3	0	1	0	1	0	6

=== Draw 5 ===
Saturday, February 8, 3:00 pm

Sheet 5	1	2	3	4	5	6	7	8	9	10	Final
Pat Paslawski	0	1	3	0	0	2	2	2	X	X	10
Greg Skauge	1	0	0	1	1	0	0	0	X	X	3

Sheet 8	1	2	3	4	5	6	7	8	9	10	Final
Jamie Koe	1	0	2	0	2	0	0	3	0	1	9
Wade Scoffin	0	2	0	2	0	0	1	0	1	0	6

=== Draw 6 ===
Sunday, February 9, 9:00 am

Sheet 6	1	2	3	4	5	6	7	8	9	10	Final
Pat Paslawski	0	0	1	1	0	0	X	X	X	X	2
Jamie Koe	0	2	0	0	2	1	X	X	X	X	5

Sheet 7	1	2	3	4	5	6	7	8	9	10	Final
Greg Skauge	2	0	2	0	0	2	X	X	X	X	6
Wade Scoffin	0	0	0	2	1	0	X	X	X	X	3

2014 Yukon/NWT Men's Curling Championship
(Northwest Territories)
Jamie Koe
8th Yukon/NWT Championship title
