= 2021 Northwest Territories Men's Curling Championship =

- Host city: Yellowknife, Northwest Territories
- Arena: Yellowknife Curling Centre
- Dates: January 30–31
- Winner: Team Skauge
- Curling club: Yellowknife CC, Yellowknife
- Skip: Greg Skauge
- Third: Tom Naugler
- Second: Brad Patzer
- Lead: Robert Borden
- Finalist: Glen Hudy

The 2021 Northwest Territories Men's Curling Championship, the men's territorial curling championship for the Northwest Territories, was held from January 30 to 31 at the Yellowknife Curling Centre in Yellowknife, Northwest Territories. The winning Greg Skauge rink represented the Northwest Territories at the 2021 Tim Hortons Brier in Calgary, Alberta, and finished with a 2–6 record. The event was held in conjunction with the 2021 Northwest Territories Scotties Tournament of Hearts, the provincial women's championship.

Due to the COVID-19 pandemic in Canada, the reigning championship rink skipped by Jamie Koe could not commit to the quarantine process in order to compete at the national championship. Only two teams, clubmates Glen Hudy and Greg Skauge, entered the event. The event was played in a best of three series. Team Skauge won the event two games to one.

== Teams ==
The teams are listed as follows:

Skip	Third	Second	Lead	Club
Glen Hudy	Brian Kelln	Franz Dziuba	Richard Klakowich	Yellowknife Curling Centre, Yellowknife
Greg Skauge	Tom Naugler	Brad Patzer	Robert Borden	Yellowknife Curling Centre, Yellowknife

== Results ==
All draw times are listed in Mountain Standard Time (UTC−07:00).

=== Draw 1 ===
Saturday, January 30, 10:00 am

Sheet B	1	2	3	4	5	6	7	8	9	10	Final
Glen Hudy	0	1	0	0	0	2	0	2	0	X	5
Greg Skauge	1	0	5	0	1	0	3	0	3	X	13

=== Draw 2 ===
Saturday, January 30, 4:30 pm

Sheet B	1	2	3	4	5	6	7	8	9	10	Final
Greg Skauge	0	1	0	1	0	3	0	0	1	X	6
Glen Hudy	1	0	2	0	2	0	2	1	0	X	8

=== Draw 3 ===
Sunday, January 31, 4:30 pm

Sheet B	1	2	3	4	5	6	7	8	9	10	Final
Glen Hudy	0	1	0	1	0	0	X	X	X	X	2
Greg Skauge	1	0	3	0	2	2	X	X	X	X	8

2021 Northwest Territories Men's Curling Championship
(Northwest Territories)
Greg Skauge
1st Territorial Championship title
