= 2023 Northwest Territories Men's Curling Championship =

- Host city: Fort Smith, Northwest Territories
- Arena: Fort Smith Curling and Winter Sports Centre
- Dates: February 1–5
- Winner: Team Koe
- Curling club: Yellowknife CC, Yellowknife
- Skip: Jamie Koe
- Third: Glen Kennedy
- Second: Cole Parsons
- Lead: Shadrach McLeod
- Finalist: Greg Skauge

The 2023 Northwest Territories Men's Curling Championship, the men's territorial curling championship for the Northwest Territories, was held from February 1 to 5 at the Fort Smith Curling and Winter Sports Centre in Fort Smith, Northwest Territories. The winning Jamie Koe rink represented the Northwest Territories at the 2023 Tim Hortons Brier in London, Ontario where they finished eighth in Pool A with a 1–7 record.

== Teams ==
The teams are listed as follows:.

Skip	Third	Second	Lead	Alternate	Locale
D'arcy Delorey	Pat Cove	Alexander Brodeur	Dallas Weaver		Hay River
Kevin Hawkshaw	Sawer Kaeser	Jim Lockhart	Jeff O'Keefe	Rob Rinas	Fort Smith
Jamie Koe	Glen Kennedy	Cole Parsons	Shadrach McLeod		Yellowknife
Greg Skauge	Tom Naugler	Brad Patzer	Robert Borden		Yellowknife

== Round-robin standings ==
Final Standings

Key
Teams to Playoffs

Skip	W	L	PF	PA	EW	EL	BE	SE
Jamie Koe	6	0	54	15	25	11	2	12
Greg Skauge	4	2	37	35	22	19	0	5
D'arcy Delorey	2	4	25	46	18	24	3	6
Kevin Hawkshaw	0	6	27	47	17	28	1	4

== Round-robin results ==
All draw times are listed in Mountain Standard Time (UTC−07:00).

=== Draw 1 ===
Wednesday, February 1, 7:00 pm

Sheet B	1	2	3	4	5	6	7	8	9	10	Final
Jamie Koe	1	3	2	0	1	2	X	X	X	X	9
D'arcy Delorey	0	0	0	0	0	0	X	X	X	X	0

Sheet C	1	2	3	4	5	6	7	8	9	10	Final
Greg Skauge	0	1	0	1	0	2	2	0	2	0	8
Kevin Hawkshaw	1	0	1	0	2	0	0	2	0	0	6

=== Draw 2 ===
Thursday, February 2, 2:00 pm

Sheet B	1	2	3	4	5	6	7	8	9	10	Final
Kevin Hawkshaw	0	2	0	1	0	1	0	1	0	X	5
Jamie Koe	2	0	3	0	2	0	0	0	2	X	9

Sheet C	1	2	3	4	5	6	7	8	9	10	Final
D'arcy Delorey	0	1	0	1	0	0	2	0	X	X	4
Greg Skauge	0	0	1	0	3	2	0	2	X	X	8

=== Draw 3 ===
Thursday, February 2, 7:00 pm

Sheet B	1	2	3	4	5	6	7	8	9	10	Final
Jamie Koe	1	0	3	1	0	2	0	4	X	X	11
Greg Skauge	0	2	0	0	2	0	1	0	X	X	5

Sheet C	1	2	3	4	5	6	7	8	9	10	Final
Kevin Hawkshaw	0	4	0	2	0	0	1	0	0	0	7
D'arcy Delorey	1	0	1	0	0	1	0	3	1	1	8

=== Draw 4 ===
Friday, February 3, 2:00 pm

Sheet B	1	2	3	4	5	6	7	8	9	10	Final
D'arcy Delorey	3	1	0	1	0	0	1	1	1	X	8
Kevin Hawkshaw	0	0	1	0	2	2	0	0	0	X	5

Sheet C	1	2	3	4	5	6	7	8	9	10	Final
Greg Skauge	0	0	1	0	0	1	X	X	X	X	2
Jamie Koe	0	3	0	2	3	0	X	X	X	X	8

=== Draw 5 ===
Friday, February 3, 7:00 pm

Sheet B	1	2	3	4	5	6	7	8	9	10	Final
Greg Skauge	1	1	0	3	0	1	1	1	X	X	8
D'arcy Delorey	0	0	1	0	2	0	0	0	X	X	3

Sheet C	1	2	3	4	5	6	7	8	9	10	Final
Jamie Koe	2	1	1	1	0	3	X	X	X	X	8
Kevin Hawkshaw	0	0	0	0	1	0	X	X	X	X	1

=== Draw 6 ===
Saturday, February 4, 9:00 am

Sheet B	1	2	3	4	5	6	7	8	9	10	Final
Kevin Hawkshaw	0	2	1	0	X	X	X	X	X	X	3
Greg Skauge	4	0	0	2	X	X	X	X	X	X	6

Sheet C	1	2	3	4	5	6	7	8	9	10	Final
D'arcy Delorey	0	0	2	0	X	X	X	X	X	X	2
Jamie Koe	5	2	0	2	X	X	X	X	X	X	9

== Playoffs ==
Semifinal			Final
			1	Jamie Koe	11
2	Greg Skauge	5	2	Greg Skauge	3
3	D'Arcy Delorey	4

=== Semifinal ===
Saturday February 4, 2:00 pm

Sheet B	1	2	3	4	5	6	7	8	9	10	Final
Greg Skauge	0	0	0	2	0	1	0	1	0	1	5
D'Arcy Delorey	0	0	1	0	2	0	0	0	1	0	4

=== Final ===
Sunday, February 5, 10:00 am

Sheet B	1	2	3	4	5	6	7	8	9	10	Final
Jamie Koe	2	0	4	0	1	0	4	X	X	X	11
Greg Skauge	0	1	0	1	0	1	0	X	X	X	3

2023 Northwest Territories Men's Curling Championship
(Northwest Territories)
Jamie Koe
16th NWT Territorial Championship title
