= 2017 Tim Hortons Brier =

- Host city: St. John's, Newfoundland and Labrador
- Arena: Mile One Centre
- Dates: March 4 – March 12
- Attendance: 122,592
- Winner: Newfoundland and Labrador
- Curling club: Bally Haly G&CC & St. John's CC, St. John's
- Skip: Brad Gushue
- Third: Mark Nichols
- Second: Brett Gallant
- Lead: Geoff Walker
- Coach: Jules Owchar
- Finalist: Canada (Kevin Koe)

The 2017 Tim Hortons Brier, Canada's national men's curling championship, was held from March 4–12, 2017 at the Mile One Centre in St. John's, Newfoundland and Labrador.

This marked the second time the Brier was hosted by St. John's, the first being the 1972 Macdonald Brier.

Newfoundland and Labrador won the Brier 7–6 in the final against Team Canada, giving skip Brad Gushue his first Brier title. With the win, the Gushue rink earned the right to represent Canada at the 2017 Ford World Men's Curling Championship held from April 1–9, 2017 at Northlands Coliseum in Edmonton, Alberta. They also represented Team Canada at the 2018 Tim Hortons Brier in Regina, Saskatchewan and earned $225,000 for the victory. The bronze medal was won by Manitoba.

The total attendance for the event was 122,592, up from the 115,047 that attended the previous year's Brier held in Ottawa, Ontario. The attendance for the final was 6,471.

== Background ==
=== Host bidding ===
Both Ontario's Sault Ste. Marie (Essar Centre) and Newfoundland and Labrador's St. John's (Mile One Centre) made bids for the Brier, but it was announced on September 14, 2015 that St. John's would host.

=== Brier Bear ===
The wearer of the Brier Bear – the Brier-renowned mascot – suit, Reg Caughie, announced that, after this 2017 Canadian Men's Curling Championship, he would retire from wearing the suit. The 78-year old Caughie believed that Curling Canada would continue the tradition of the Brier Bear.

== Teams ==
Ten of the fifteen teams of the 2017 Brier were in the top 30 of the men's 2016–17 CTRS standings. Newfoundland and Labrador's Brad Gushue, skip of one of the consistent top three rinks in Canada, attempted to win his first Brier (in 14 appearances) in front of a hometown crowd. Brothers Kevin Koe – representing Team Canada, and Jamie Koe – representing the Northwest Territories, again competed against each other. 2016 PEI Champion Adam Casey and his third David Mathers moved west to join rinks that then won the championships of Saskatchewan and Ontario, respectively.

Glenn Howard won the Ontario Championship for the 17th time as either third or skip. By contrast, a team not skipped by either Kevin Martin, Randy Ferbey or Kevin Koe won the Alberta Championship for the first time since 1999 (although Kevin Martin coached Alberta's Brendan Bottcher).

The teams are listed as follows:

Canada	Alberta	British Columbia
The Glencoe Club, Calgary Skip: Kevin Koe; Third: Marc Kennedy; Second: Brent Laing; Lead: Ben Hebert (Note: Pfeifer threw lead stones during Draw 8 and the last two ends of Draw 12.); Alternate: Scott Pfeifer	Saville SC, Edmonton Skip: Brendan Bottcher; Third: Darren Moulding; Second: Brad Thiessen; Lead: Karrick Martin; Alternate: Evan Asmussen	Vernon CC, Vernon; Kelowna CC, Kelowna Fourth: Jim Cotter; Skip: John Morris; Second: Tyrel Griffith; Lead: Rick Sawatsky; Alternate: David Harper
Manitoba	New Brunswick	Newfoundland and Labrador
Fort Rouge CC, Winnipeg Skip: Mike McEwen; Third: B.J. Neufeld; Second: Matt Wozniak; Lead: Denni Neufeld	Capital WC, Fredericton Skip: Mike Kennedy; Third: Scott Jones; Second: Marc LeCocq; Lead: Jamie Brannen (Note: Mawhinney threw lead stones during Draw 17.); Alternate: Spencer Mawhinney	Bally Haly G&CC & St. John's CC, St. John's Skip: Brad Gushue; Third: Mark Nichols; Second: Brett Gallant; Lead: Geoff Walker
Northern Ontario	Nova Scotia	Ontario
Community First CC, Sault Ste. Marie Skip: Brad Jacobs; Third: Ryan Fry; Second: E.J. Harnden; Lead: Ryan Harnden; Alternate: Lee Toner	Halifax CC, Halifax Skip: Jamie Murphy; Third: Jordan Pinder; Second: Scott Saccary; Lead: Phil Crowell; Alternate: Alan Darragh	St. George's G&CC, Etobicoke Skip: Glenn Howard; Third: Richard Hart; Second: David Mathers; Lead: Scott Howard; Alternate: Adam Spencer
Prince Edward Island	Quebec	Saskatchewan
Charlottetown CC, Charlottetown Skip: Eddie MacKenzie; Third: Sean Ledgerwood; Second: Matt Nabuurs; Lead: Robbie Doherty; Alternate: Philip Gorveatt	CC Etchemin, Saint-Romuald Skip: Jean-Michel Ménard; Third: Martin Crête; Second: Éric Sylvain; Lead: Philippe Ménard; Alternate: Pierre Charette	Highland CC, Regina Skip: Adam Casey; Third: Catlin Schneider; Second: Shaun Meachem; Lead: Dustin Kidby; Alternate: Jamie Schneider
Northwest Territories	Nunavut	Yukon
Yellowknife CC, Yellowknife Skip: Jamie Koe; Third: Chris Schille; Second: Brad Chorostkowski; Lead: Robert Borden; Alternate: Greg Skauge	Iqaluit CC, Iqaluit Skip: Jim Nix; Third: Edmund MacDonald; Second: Greg Howard; Lead: Darryl McGrath; Alternate: Howard Fick	Whitehorse CC, Whitehorse Fourth: Jon Solberg; Skip: Craig Kochan; Second: Ray Mikkelsen; Lead: Darrin Fredrickson; Alternate: Wade Scoffin

=== CTRS ranking ===
Member Association (Skip)	Rank	Points
Newfoundland and Labrador (Gushue)	1	429.656
Northern Ontario (Jacobs)	3	360.302
British Columbia (Morris)	6	271.684
Manitoba (McEwen)	7	270.471
Canada (K. Koe)	8	247.888
Alberta (Bottcher)	9	202.627
Ontario (Howard)	11	178.349
Saskatchewan (Casey)	15	153.302
Nova Scotia (Murphy)	25	87.118
Quebec (Ménard)	28	83.258
New Brunswick (Kennedy)	57	41.846
Northwest Territories (J. Koe)	73	32.849
Yukon (Solberg)	225	0.376
Nunavut (Nix)	NR	0.000
Prince Edward Island (MacKenzie)	NR	0.000

== Map of teams ==
Team Canada Provincial Winners

== Pre-qualifying tournament ==
=== Standings ===
Locale	Skip	W	L	PF	PA	EW	EL	BE	SE	S%
Nova Scotia	Jamie Murphy	3	0	35	7	18	5	1	11	84%
Yukon	Craig Kochan	2	1	24	16	15	10	1	9	76%
Prince Edward Island	Eddie MacKenzie	1	2	19	26	9	16	1	2	73%
Nunavut	Jim Nix	0	3	9	38	6	17	1	1	56%

=== Results ===
All draw times are listed in Newfoundland Standard Time (UTC−03:30).

==== Draw 1 ====
Thursday, March 2, 7:00 pm

Sheet C	1	2	3	4	5	6	7	8	9	10	Final
Nunavut (Nix)	0	0	1	0	0	1	2	0	X	X	4
Prince Edward Island (MacKenzie) 🔨	2	1	0	3	4	0	0	1	X	X	11

Sheet D	1	2	3	4	5	6	7	8	9	10	Final
Nova Scotia (Murphy) 🔨	2	1	1	1	2	0	0	1	X	X	8
Yukon (Kochan)	0	0	0	0	0	1	1	0	X	X	2

==== Draw 2 ====
Friday, March 3, 8:00 am

Sheet A	1	2	3	4	5	6	7	8	9	10	Final
Yukon (Kochan) 🔨	1	0	1	1	0	2	3	0	2	2	12
Prince Edward Island (MacKenzie)	0	2	0	0	4	0	0	1	0	0	7

Sheet B	1	2	3	4	5	6	7	8	9	10	Final
Nova Scotia (Murphy) 🔨	3	2	4	3	0	4	0	1	X	X	17
Nunavut (Nix)	0	0	0	0	2	0	2	0	X	X	4

==== Draw 3 ====
Friday, March 3, 3:30 pm

Sheet C	1	2	3	4	5	6	7	8	9	10	Final
Yukon (Kochan)	0	1	1	2	0	1	2	3	X	X	10
Nunavut (Nix) 🔨	0	0	0	0	1	0	0	0	X	X	1

Sheet D	1	2	3	4	5	6	7	8	9	10	Final
Prince Edward Island (MacKenzie)	0	0	0	0	0	0	1	0	X	X	1
Nova Scotia (Murphy) 🔨	1	2	1	3	0	1	0	2	X	X	10

=== Pre-qualifying final ===
Saturday, March 4, 3:00 pm

Sheet D	1	2	3	4	5	6	7	8	9	10	Final
Nova Scotia (Murphy) 🔨	1	0	3	0	2	0	3	0	0	X	9
Yukon (Kochan)	0	2	0	1	0	0	0	2	1	X	6

== Round-robin standings ==
Final round-robin standings

Key
Teams to Playoffs

Locale	Skip	W	L	PF	PA	EW	EL	BE	SE	S%
Manitoba	Mike McEwen	9	2	75	50	44	36	21	11	88%
Newfoundland and Labrador	Brad Gushue	9	2	71	59	46	42	17	8	89%
Canada	Kevin Koe	8	3	69	58	44	41	23	8	87%
Northern Ontario	Brad Jacobs	8	3	76	59	46	40	17	9	88%
Quebec	Jean-Michel Ménard	7	4	73	62	44	44	16	5	85%
British Columbia	John Morris	7	4	63	48	43	40	22	12	86%
Saskatchewan	Adam Casey	5	6	74	73	46	46	10	8	87%
Nova Scotia	Jamie Murphy	4	7	64	75	39	47	15	6	82%
Ontario	Glenn Howard	4	7	57	67	44	41	21	6	86%
Alberta	Brendan Bottcher	3	8	61	74	41	41	17	9	83%
New Brunswick	Mike Kennedy	1	10	56	80	43	47	13	6	81%
Northwest Territories	Jamie Koe	1	10	48	82	35	50	16	4	81%

== Round-robin results ==
All draw times are listed in Newfoundland Standard Time (UTC−03:30).

=== Draw 1 ===
Saturday, March 4, 3:00 pm

Sheet A	1	2	3	4	5	6	7	8	9	10	Final
British Columbia (Morris)	1	2	0	1	0	2	0	0	1	X	7
Northern Ontario (Jacobs) 🔨	0	0	3	0	3	0	1	2	0	X	9

Sheet B	1	2	3	4	5	6	7	8	9	10	Final
Saskatchewan (Casey)	0	0	2	0	1	0	0	0	1	1	5
Manitoba (McEwen) 🔨	1	0	0	2	0	2	1	0	0	0	6

Sheet C	1	2	3	4	5	6	7	8	9	10	Final
Newfoundland and Labrador (Gushue)	0	2	0	2	0	1	0	3	0	X	8
Alberta (Bottcher) 🔨	1	0	1	0	1	0	2	0	1	X	6

=== Draw 2 ===
Saturday, March 4, 8:00 pm

Sheet B	1	2	3	4	5	6	7	8	9	10	Final
Canada (K. Koe)	0	0	1	2	0	0	2	0	2	X	7
Quebec (Ménard) 🔨	1	0	0	0	2	0	0	2	0	X	5

Sheet C	1	2	3	4	5	6	7	8	9	10	11	Final
Ontario (Howard) 🔨	1	1	0	0	0	0	0	1	0	2	0	5
Nova Scotia (Murphy)	0	0	0	2	0	0	0	0	3	0	1	6

Sheet D	1	2	3	4	5	6	7	8	9	10	Final
New Brunswick (Kennedy) 🔨	1	1	0	1	0	0	1	0	2	0	6
Northwest Territories (J. Koe)	0	0	1	0	1	0	0	2	0	1	5

=== Draw 3 ===
Sunday, March 5, 10:00 am

Sheet A	1	2	3	4	5	6	7	8	9	10	Final
Manitoba (McEwen) 🔨	0	2	0	0	2	1	0	3	X	X	8
Newfoundland and Labrador (Gushue)	1	0	2	0	0	0	1	0	X	X	4

Sheet B	1	2	3	4	5	6	7	8	9	10	Final
British Columbia (Morris) 🔨	0	1	0	0	1	0	0	0	1	0	3
Ontario (Howard)	1	0	1	1	0	0	1	0	0	1	5

Sheet C	1	2	3	4	5	6	7	8	9	10	Final
Canada (K. Koe)	2	0	0	2	0	1	0	1	0	X	6
Northern Ontario (Jacobs) 🔨	0	2	0	0	1	0	1	0	0	X	4

Sheet D	1	2	3	4	5	6	7	8	9	10	Final
Alberta (Bottcher)	0	0	2	0	0	2	1	0	0	X	5
Saskatchewan (Casey) 🔨	3	1	0	2	1	0	0	1	3	X	11

=== Draw 4 ===
Sunday, March 5, 3:00 pm

Sheet A	1	2	3	4	5	6	7	8	9	10	Final
Northwest Territories (J. Koe)	0	0	2	0	0	0	1	0	X	X	3
Saskatchewan (Casey) 🔨	3	0	0	0	2	0	0	3	X	X	8

Sheet B	1	2	3	4	5	6	7	8	9	10	Final
Alberta (Bottcher)	0	2	0	1	1	1	0	1	0	X	6
Nova Scotia (Murphy) 🔨	2	0	3	0	0	0	2	0	4	X	11

Sheet C	1	2	3	4	5	6	7	8	9	10	Final
British Columbia (Morris) 🔨	1	0	3	0	1	0	0	3	X	X	8
New Brunswick (Kennedy)	0	1	0	1	0	1	0	0	X	X	3

Sheet D	1	2	3	4	5	6	7	8	9	10	11	Final
Quebec (Ménard) 🔨	0	2	0	0	2	0	0	2	0	2	0	8
Northern Ontario (Jacobs)	1	0	0	2	0	2	2	0	1	0	1	9

=== Draw 5 ===
Sunday, March 5, 8:00 pm

Sheet A	1	2	3	4	5	6	7	8	9	10	Final
Quebec (Ménard)	0	2	0	1	0	2	3	0	2	X	10
Nova Scotia (Murphy) 🔨	2	0	2	0	1	0	0	1	0	X	6

Sheet B	1	2	3	4	5	6	7	8	9	10	Final
Newfoundland and Labrador (Gushue)	0	2	2	0	0	1	0	0	0	X	5
New Brunswick (Kennedy) 🔨	1	0	0	0	2	0	1	0	0	X	4

Sheet C	1	2	3	4	5	6	7	8	9	10	Final
Manitoba (McEwen) 🔨	0	2	0	0	0	2	1	0	1	X	6
Northwest Territories (J. Koe)	0	0	0	1	0	0	0	1	0	X	2

Sheet D	1	2	3	4	5	6	7	8	9	10	Final
Canada (K. Koe)	0	1	0	1	0	1	0	0	0	2	5
Ontario (Howard) 🔨	2	0	0	0	1	0	0	0	1	0	4

=== Draw 6 ===
Monday, March 6, 3:00 pm

Sheet A	1	2	3	4	5	6	7	8	9	10	Final
Alberta (Bottcher)	1	0	0	0	1	2	0	3	X	X	7
New Brunswick (Kennedy) 🔨	0	1	0	0	0	0	1	0	X	X	2

Sheet B	1	2	3	4	5	6	7	8	9	10	Final
Northern Ontario (Jacobs) 🔨	0	1	0	0	1	1	0	3	0	3	9
Northwest Territories (J. Koe)	0	0	0	2	0	0	2	0	1	0	5

Sheet C	1	2	3	4	5	6	7	8	9	10	Final
Saskatchewan (Casey)	0	2	0	0	0	1	0	0	X	X	3
Quebec (Ménard) 🔨	1	0	2	0	3	0	1	1	X	X	8

Sheet D	1	2	3	4	5	6	7	8	9	10	Final
Nova Scotia (Murphy)	0	0	0	0	0	0	1	1	1	0	3
British Columbia (Morris) 🔨	0	0	2	0	1	0	0	0	0	1	4

=== Draw 7 ===
Monday, March 6, 8:00 pm

Sheet A	1	2	3	4	5	6	7	8	9	10	Final
Canada (K. Koe)	0	1	1	0	0	0	0	0	1	1	4
British Columbia (Morris) 🔨	2	0	0	2	0	0	1	0	0	0	5

Sheet B	1	2	3	4	5	6	7	8	9	10	Final
Manitoba (McEwen) 🔨	0	2	0	0	2	0	2	0	4	X	10
Alberta (Bottcher)	1	0	0	2	0	1	0	2	0	X	6

Sheet C	1	2	3	4	5	6	7	8	9	10	Final
Northern Ontario (Jacobs) 🔨	0	3	0	0	1	0	2	1	X	X	7
Ontario (Howard)	0	0	1	0	0	1	0	0	X	X	2

Sheet D	1	2	3	4	5	6	7	8	9	10	Final
Saskatchewan (Casey) 🔨	0	2	0	1	0	1	0	1	0	X	5
Newfoundland and Labrador (Gushue)	1	0	2	0	2	0	1	0	4	X	10

=== Draw 8 ===
Tuesday, March 7, 10:00 am

Sheet A	1	2	3	4	5	6	7	8	9	10	Final
Newfoundland and Labrador (Gushue) 🔨	1	0	0	0	0	1	0	2	0	0	4
Northwest Territories (J. Koe)	0	2	0	0	1	0	1	0	1	3	8

Sheet B	1	2	3	4	5	6	7	8	9	10	Final
Nova Scotia (Murphy) 🔨	0	1	0	2	0	0	1	0	1	X	5
Canada (K. Koe)	0	0	3	0	0	2	0	3	0	X	8

Sheet C	1	2	3	4	5	6	7	8	9	10	Final
New Brunswick (Kennedy) 🔨	1	0	0	3	1	0	2	0	0	0	7
Manitoba (McEwen)	0	2	0	0	0	1	0	2	2	2	9

Sheet D	1	2	3	4	5	6	7	8	9	10	11	Final
Ontario (Howard) 🔨	1	0	0	1	0	1	0	2	0	1	0	6
Quebec (Ménard)	0	0	1	0	2	0	2	0	1	0	1	7

=== Draw 9 ===
Tuesday, March 7, 3:00 pm

Sheet A	1	2	3	4	5	6	7	8	9	10	Final
Nova Scotia (Murphy)	0	0	0	2	0	0	1	0	X	X	3
Northern Ontario (Jacobs) 🔨	2	0	2	0	3	0	0	1	X	X	8

Sheet B	1	2	3	4	5	6	7	8	9	10	11	Final
New Brunswick (Kennedy) 🔨	1	0	0	1	0	0	2	0	1	1	0	6
Saskatchewan (Casey)	0	1	0	0	2	1	0	2	0	0	1	7

Sheet C	1	2	3	4	5	6	7	8	9	10	11	Final
Quebec (Ménard) 🔨	0	0	0	0	1	0	1	1	1	0	1	5
British Columbia (Morris)	1	0	0	0	0	1	0	0	0	2	0	4

Sheet D	1	2	3	4	5	6	7	8	9	10	Final
Northwest Territories (J. Koe)	0	0	0	0	1	0	2	0	X	X	3
Alberta (Bottcher) 🔨	0	2	2	2	0	2	0	2	X	X	10

=== Draw 10 ===
Tuesday, March 7, 8:00 pm

Sheet A	1	2	3	4	5	6	7	8	9	10	Final
Saskatchewan (Casey) 🔨	3	0	0	1	0	5	0	0	X	X	9
Ontario (Howard)	0	0	2	0	2	0	1	0	X	X	5

Sheet B	1	2	3	4	5	6	7	8	9	10	Final
Northern Ontario (Jacobs)	0	2	0	0	0	0	2	0	1	X	5
Newfoundland and Labrador (Gushue) 🔨	2	0	0	0	2	1	0	2	0	X	7

Sheet C	1	2	3	4	5	6	7	8	9	10	Final
Canada (K. Koe) 🔨	0	0	0	0	1	0	2	0	1	0	4
Alberta (Bottcher)	0	0	0	1	0	2	0	2	0	1	6

Sheet D	1	2	3	4	5	6	7	8	9	10	Final
British Columbia (Morris) 🔨	2	0	2	1	0	0	0	2	0	X	7
Manitoba (McEwen)	0	1	0	0	2	1	0	0	1	X	5

=== Draw 11 ===
Wednesday, March 8, 10:00 am

Sheet A	1	2	3	4	5	6	7	8	9	10	Final
Quebec (Ménard) 🔨	1	0	0	1	0	3	0	0	3	X	8
Alberta (Bottcher)	0	0	1	0	2	0	2	0	0	X	5

Sheet B	1	2	3	4	5	6	7	8	9	10	Final
Northwest Territories (J. Koe)	0	0	0	0	0	1	0	0	X	X	1
British Columbia (Morris) 🔨	2	0	1	3	1	0	1	1	X	X	9

Sheet C	1	2	3	4	5	6	7	8	9	10	Final
Nova Scotia (Murphy)	0	0	0	3	1	0	1	0	2	0	7
Saskatchewan (Casey) 🔨	0	1	3	0	0	2	0	1	0	1	8

Sheet D	1	2	3	4	5	6	7	8	9	10	Final
Northern Ontario (Jacobs)	0	0	2	1	1	0	0	1	0	1	6
New Brunswick (Kennedy) 🔨	1	0	0	0	0	2	1	0	1	0	5

=== Draw 12 ===
Wednesday, March 8, 3:00 pm

Sheet A	1	2	3	4	5	6	7	8	9	10	Final
Northern Ontario (Jacobs) 🔨	2	0	0	1	0	0	1	0	1	0	5
Manitoba (McEwen)	0	1	0	0	0	1	0	2	0	2	6

Sheet B	1	2	3	4	5	6	7	8	9	10	Final
Alberta (Bottcher)	0	0	0	0	0	1	0	0	2	X	3
Ontario (Howard) 🔨	0	0	1	1	1	0	2	1	0	X	6

Sheet C	1	2	3	4	5	6	7	8	9	10	11	Final
British Columbia (Morris)	0	1	0	0	0	0	0	1	0	2	0	4
Newfoundland and Labrador (Gushue) 🔨	1	0	0	2	0	0	0	0	1	0	1	5

Sheet D	1	2	3	4	5	6	7	8	9	10	Final
Canada (K. Koe) 🔨	2	0	1	0	2	1	0	2	0	0	8
Saskatchewan (Casey)	0	1	0	1	0	0	2	0	2	1	7

=== Draw 13 ===
Wednesday, March 8, 8:00 pm

Sheet A	1	2	3	4	5	6	7	8	9	10	Final
Northwest Territories (J. Koe)	0	2	0	1	0	0	0	2	1	0	6
Canada (K. Koe) 🔨	3	0	2	0	2	0	0	0	0	1	8

Sheet B	1	2	3	4	5	6	7	8	9	10	Final
Nova Scotia (Murphy)	0	1	0	1	1	0	0	0	0	X	3
Manitoba (McEwen) 🔨	1	0	2	0	0	0	2	1	3	X	9

Sheet C	1	2	3	4	5	6	7	8	9	10	Final
Ontario (Howard) 🔨	1	0	2	0	3	0	0	0	2	0	8
New Brunswick (Kennedy)	0	2	0	1	0	1	0	1	0	1	6

Sheet D	1	2	3	4	5	6	7	8	9	10	Final
Newfoundland and Labrador (Gushue)	0	1	0	3	0	0	1	0	2	X	7
Quebec (Ménard) 🔨	1	0	1	0	1	0	0	0	0	X	3

=== Draw 14 ===
Thursday, March 9, 10:00 am

Sheet A	1	2	3	4	5	6	7	8	9	10	Final
New Brunswick (Kennedy) 🔨	2	1	0	2	0	0	1	0	1	X	7
Nova Scotia (Murphy)	0	0	1	0	4	2	0	2	0	X	9

Sheet B	1	2	3	4	5	6	7	8	9	10	Final
Saskatchewan (Casey) 🔨	1	0	1	0	1	0	2	0	0	X	5
Northern Ontario (Jacobs)	0	2	0	1	0	2	0	2	1	X	8

Sheet C	1	2	3	4	5	6	7	8	9	10	Final
Northwest Territories (J. Koe)	0	1	1	0	1	0	2	0	1	0	6
Quebec (Ménard) 🔨	2	0	0	2	0	2	0	1	0	1	8

Sheet D	1	2	3	4	5	6	7	8	9	10	Final
Alberta (Bottcher)	0	0	0	1	0	1	0	0	0	X	2
British Columbia (Morris) 🔨	1	0	0	0	2	0	1	0	1	X	5

=== Draw 15 ===
Thursday, March 9, 3:00 pm

Sheet A	1	2	3	4	5	6	7	8	9	10	11	Final
Ontario (Howard) 🔨	0	1	0	2	0	1	0	1	0	2	0	7
Newfoundland and Labrador (Gushue)	0	0	3	0	2	0	1	0	1	0	1	8

Sheet B	1	2	3	4	5	6	7	8	9	10	Final
Quebec (Ménard) 🔨	2	0	3	0	0	2	0	2	X	X	9
New Brunswick (Kennedy)	0	2	0	0	1	0	1	0	X	X	4

Sheet C	1	2	3	4	5	6	7	8	9	10	Final
Manitoba (McEwen)	0	0	0	0	2	0	0	1	0	0	3
Canada (K. Koe) 🔨	0	0	0	1	0	1	0	0	2	2	6

Sheet D	1	2	3	4	5	6	7	8	9	10	Final
Northwest Territories (J. Koe)	0	1	0	2	0	1	0	0	X	X	4
Nova Scotia (Murphy) 🔨	1	0	3	0	1	0	2	1	X	X	8

=== Draw 16 ===
Thursday, March 9, 8:00 pm

Sheet A	1	2	3	4	5	6	7	8	9	10	Final
British Columbia (Morris)	0	1	0	2	2	0	1	0	0	1	7
Saskatchewan (Casey) 🔨	1	0	2	0	0	1	0	1	1	0	6

Sheet B	1	2	3	4	5	6	7	8	9	10	11	Final
Newfoundland and Labrador (Gushue)	0	0	2	0	1	1	0	1	1	0	1	7
Canada (K. Koe) 🔨	3	0	0	1	0	0	1	0	0	1	0	6

Sheet C	1	2	3	4	5	6	7	8	9	10	Final
Alberta (Bottcher) 🔨	0	1	0	0	1	0	0	2	0	1	5
Northern Ontario (Jacobs)	0	0	2	0	0	2	0	0	2	0	6

Sheet D	1	2	3	4	5	6	7	8	9	10	Final
Manitoba (McEwen) 🔨	0	0	2	0	2	0	4	0	X	X	8
Ontario (Howard)	0	0	0	1	0	1	0	1	X	X	3

=== Draw 17 ===
Friday, March 10, 10:00 am

Sheet A	1	2	3	4	5	6	7	8	9	10	Final
Manitoba (McEwen) 🔨	0	0	1	0	0	1	1	1	1	X	5
Quebec (Ménard)	0	0	0	2	0	0	0	0	0	X	2

Sheet B	1	2	3	4	5	6	7	8	9	10	Final
Ontario (Howard) 🔨	1	0	2	0	0	1	0	1	0	1	6
Northwest Territories (J. Koe)	0	2	0	1	0	0	1	0	1	0	5

Sheet C	1	2	3	4	5	6	7	8	9	10	Final
Newfoundland and Labrador (Gushue) 🔨	1	0	0	1	1	0	2	0	1	X	6
Nova Scotia (Murphy)	0	0	1	0	0	1	0	1	0	X	3

Sheet D	1	2	3	4	5	6	7	8	9	10	Final
New Brunswick (Kennedy) 🔨	2	0	0	1	0	2	0	0	1	0	6
Canada (K. Koe)	0	0	2	0	1	0	1	2	0	1	7

== Playoffs ==
Page playoff system
1	Manitoba	5
2	Newfoundland and Labrador	7
3	Canada	6
4	Northern Ontario	2

Semifinal
1	Manitoba	6
3	Canada	7

Final
2	Newfoundland and Labrador	7
3	Canada	6

Bronze Medal Game
1	Manitoba	7
4	Northern Ontario	5

=== 1 vs. 2 ===
Friday, March 10, 8:00 pm

Sheet B	1	2	3	4	5	6	7	8	9	10	Final
Manitoba (McEwen) 🔨	1	0	1	0	0	0	0	2	0	1	5
Newfoundland and Labrador (Gushue)	0	2	0	2	0	0	1	0	2	0	7

Player percentages
Manitoba		Newfoundland and Labrador	
Denni Neufeld	89%	Geoff Walker	90%
Matt Wozniak	84%	Brett Gallant	95%
B.J. Neufeld	80%	Mark Nichols	96%
Mike McEwen	76%	Brad Gushue	95%
Total	82%	Total	94%

=== 3 vs. 4 ===
Saturday, March 11, 3:00 pm

Team	1	2	3	4	5	6	7	8	9	10	Final
Canada (K. Koe) 🔨	1	1	0	0	1	0	0	1	2	X	6
Northern Ontario (Jacobs)	0	0	0	0	0	2	0	0	0	X	2

Player percentages
Canada		Northern Ontario	
Ben Hebert	88%	Ryan Harnden	93%
Brent Laing	92%	E.J. Harnden	86%
Marc Kennedy	81%	Ryan Fry	89%
Kevin Koe	89%	Brad Jacobs	74%
Total	87%	Total	85%

=== Semifinal ===
Saturday, March 11, 8:30 pm

Team	1	2	3	4	5	6	7	8	9	10	11	Final
Manitoba (McEwen) 🔨	0	0	0	3	0	2	0	0	1	0	0	6
Canada (K. Koe)	0	0	1	0	1	0	1	1	0	2	1	7

Player percentages
Manitoba		Canada	
Denni Neufeld	84%	Ben Hebert	97%
Matt Wozniak	94%	Brent Laing	82%
B.J. Neufeld	97%	Marc Kennedy	100%
Mike McEwen	83%	Kevin Koe	89%
Total	89%	Total	92%

=== Bronze medal game ===
Sunday, March 12, 3:00 pm

Team	1	2	3	4	5	6	7	8	9	10	11	Final
Manitoba (McEwen) 🔨	1	0	0	0	2	1	0	0	1	0	2	7
Northern Ontario (Jacobs)	0	0	1	1	0	0	0	2	0	1	0	5

Player percentages
Manitoba		Northern Ontario	
Denni Neufeld	90%	Ryan Harnden	92%
Matt Wozniak	98%	E.J. Harnden	98%
B.J. Neufeld	98%	Ryan Fry	89%
Mike McEwen	89%	Brad Jacobs	92%
Total	93%	Total	93%

=== Final ===
Sunday, March 12, 8:00 pm

Sheet C	1	2	3	4	5	6	7	8	9	10	Final
Newfoundland and Labrador (Gushue) 🔨	0	3	0	0	2	0	0	1	0	1	7
Canada (K. Koe)	0	0	0	1	0	3	1	0	1	0	6

Player percentages
Newfoundland and Labrador		Canada	
Geoff Walker	85%	Ben Hebert	94%
Brett Gallant	86%	Brent Laing	86%
Mark Nichols	94%	Marc Kennedy	75%
Brad Gushue	85%	Kevin Koe	86%
Total	88%	Total	85%

== Statistics ==
=== Player percentages ===
Round Robin only

Leads	%
(Manitoba) Denni Neufeld	94
(Newfoundland and Labrador) Geoff Walker	93
(Northern Ontario) Ryan Harnden	92
(Canada) Ben Hebert	92
(Saskatchewan) Dustin Kidby	92

Seconds	%
(Northern Ontario) E.J. Harnden	92
(Manitoba) Matt Wozniak	91
(Newfoundland and Labrador) Brett Gallant	88
(British Columbia) Tyrel Griffith	88
(Saskatchewan) Shaun Meachem	88

Thirds	%
(Saskatchewan) Catlin Schneider	89
(Newfoundland and Labrador) Mark Nichols	86
(British Columbia) John Morris (Skip)	86
(Quebec) Martin Crête	86
(Canada) Marc Kennedy	86

Skips/Fourths	%
(Newfoundland and Labrador) Brad Gushue	91
(Manitoba) Mike McEwen	86
(Canada) Kevin Koe	86
(Ontario) Glenn Howard	84
(Quebec) Jean-Michel Ménard	82

=== Perfect games ===
Round Robin only

Player	Team	Position	Shots	Opponent
Brad Gushue	Newfoundland and Labrador	Skip	19	Alberta
E.J. Harnden	Northern Ontario	Second	16	Nova Scotia

== Awards ==
The awards and all-star teams are listed as follows:

All-Star Teams

First Team

- Skip: Brad Gushue, Newfoundland and Labrador
- Third: Catlin Schneider, Saskatchewan
- Second: E.J. Harnden, Northern Ontario
- Lead: Denni Neufeld, Manitoba

Second Team

- Skip: Mike McEwen, Manitoba
- Third: Mark Nichols, Newfoundland and Labrador
- Second: Matt Wozniak, Manitoba
- Lead: Geoff Walker, Newfoundland and Labrador

Ross Harstone Sportsmanship Award

- Jean-Michel Ménard, Quebec Skip

Paul McLean Award

- Leigh Buttery, TSN

Hec Gervais Most Valuable Player Award

- Brad Gushue, Newfoundland and Labrador Skip

== Provincial and territorial playdowns ==
- 2017 Boston Pizza Cup (Alberta)
- (British Columbia) 2017 belairdirect BC Men's Curling Championship
- 2017 Viterra Championship (Manitoba)
- (New Brunswick) 2017 Pepsi Tankard
- 2017 Newfoundland and Labrador Tankard
- (Northern Ontario) 2017 Travelers Men's NOCA Provincials
- 2017 Deloitte Tankard (Nova Scotia)
- 2017 Ontario Tankard
- (Prince Edward Island) 2017 PEI Tankard
- 2017 WFG Tankard (Quebec)
- 2017 SaskTel Tankard (Saskatchewan)
- 2017 Northwest Territories Men's Curling Championship
- 2017 Yukon Men's Curling Championship
- 2017 Nunavut Brier Playdowns
