= 2012 Yukon/NWT Men's Curling Championship =

The 2012 Yukon/NWT Men's Curling Championship was held February 9–12 at the Whitehorse Curling Club in Whitehorse, Yukon. The winning team of Jamie Koe, represented Yukon/Northwest Territories at the 2012 Tim Hortons Brier in Saskatoon, Saskatchewan.

== Teams ==
Skip	Vice	Second	Lead	Club
George Hilderman	Gord Zealand	Pat Molloy	Bob Walker	Whitehorse Curling Club, Whitehorse
Jamie Koe	Tom Naugler	Brad Chorostkowski	Robert Borden	Yellowknife Curling Club, Yellowknife
Steve Moss	Brad Patzer	Cory Vanthuyne	Trevor Moss	Yellowknife Curling Club, Yellowknife
Jon Solberg	Doug Gee	Steve Fecteau	Clint Ireland	Whitehorse Curling Club, Whitehorse

== Standings ==
Skip (Club)	W	L	PF	PA	Ends Won	Ends Lost	Blank Ends	Stolen Ends
Jamie Koe (Yellowknife)	6	0	57	27	26	20	4	5
Jon Solberg (Whitehorse)	3	3	37	36	24	26	5	8
Steve Moss (Yellowknife)	2	4	33	49	23	22	7	6
George Hilderman (Whitehorse)	1	5	28	43	21	26	4	4

== Results ==
=== Draw 1 ===
February 9, 3:00 PM

Sheet 2	1	2	3	4	5	6	7	8	9	10	Final
Hilderman	1	0	0	0	1	0	0	1	0	0	3
Solberg	0	2	0	1	0	1	1	0	1	2	8

Sheet 3	1	2	3	4	5	6	7	8	9	10	Final
Moss	2	0	0	1	0	0	0	1	0	X	4
Koe	0	2	3	0	0	2	0	0	3	X	10

=== Draw 2 ===
February 10, 10:00 AM

Sheet A	1	2	3	4	5	6	7	8	9	10	Final
Koe	2	0	1	0	3	0	0	4	X	X	10
Hilderman	0	1	0	0	0	1	2	0	X	X	4

Sheet B	1	2	3	4	5	6	7	8	9	10	Final
Solberg	1	0	0	0	2	0	0	0	3	0	6
Moss	0	2	0	1	0	2	0	1	0	1	7

=== Draw 3 ===
February 10, 3:00 PM

Sheet A	1	2	3	4	5	6	7	8	9	10	Final
Koe	3	0	0	0	4	3	0	2	X	X	12
Moss	0	1	1	1	0	0	2	0	X	X	5

Sheet B	1	2	3	4	5	6	7	8	9	10	Final
Solberg	0	0	0	3	2	1	1	0	1	X	8
Hilderman	2	1	1	0	0	0	0	1	0	X	5

=== Draw 4 ===
February 11, 1:00 PM

Sheet A	1	2	3	4	5	6	7	8	9	10	Final
Hilderman	0	1	0	2	0	1	0	0	0	X	4
Moss	1	0	2	0	2	0	0	2	1	X	8

Sheet B	1	2	3	4	5	6	7	8	9	10	Final
Koe	0	3	0	3	1	1	X	X	X	X	8
Solberg	0	0	1	0	0	0	X	X	X	X	1

=== Draw 5 ===
February 11, 7:00 PM

Sheet A	1	2	3	4	5	6	7	8	9	10	Final
Moss	0	2	1	0	0	0	1	0	1	0	5
Solberg	0	0	0	1	2	1	0	2	0	1	7

Sheet B	1	2	3	4	5	6	7	8	9	10	Final
Hilderman	1	0	1	0	1	0	2	0	1	X	6
Koe	0	2	0	3	0	2	0	2	0	X	9

=== Draw 6 ===
February 12, 8:30 AM

Sheet A	1	2	3	4	5	6	7	8	9	10	Final
Moss	1	0	0	0	3	0	X	X	X	X	4
Hilderman	0	0	4	1	0	1	X	X	X	X	6

Sheet B	1	2	3	4	5	6	7	8	9	10	Final
Solberg	0	0	3	0	1	0	2	0	1	0	7
Koe	1	1	0	2	0	1	0	2	0	1	8

2012 Yukon/NWT Men's Curling Championship

Jamie Koe
Yukon/Northwest Territories Championship title
