= 2020 Northwest Territories Men's Curling Championship =

- Host city: Hay River, Northwest Territories
- Arena: Hay River Curling Club
- Dates: January 30 – February 2
- Winner: Team Koe
- Curling club: Yellowknife Curling Club, Yellowknife
- Skip: Jamie Koe
- Third: David Aho
- Second: Shadrach Mcleod
- Lead: Cole Parsons
- Finalist: Glen Hudy

The 2020 Northwest Territories Men's Curling Championship was held from January 30 to February 2 at the Hay River Curling Club in Hay River. The winning Jamie Koe rink represented the Northwest Territories at the 2020 Tim Hortons Brier in Kingston, Ontario and finished with a 2–5 record.

Five teams entered the event, and played a round robin tournament with a three team playoff. Jamie Koe won his fourteenth Northwest Territories Men's Curling Championship when he defeated Glen Hudy 11–5 in the final.

== Teams ==
The teams are listed as follows:

Skip	Third	Second	Lead	Locale
D'arcy Delorey	Andrew Dunbar	Norman Bassett	Stephen Robertson	Hay River
Keith Dohey	Glenn Smith	Bruce Powder	Darryl Buhler	Hay River
Glen Hudy	Brian Kelln	Franz Dziuba	Richard Klakowich	Yellowknife
Jamie Koe	David Aho	Shadrach Mcleod	Cole Parsons	Yellowknife
Greg Skauge	Tom Naugler	Brad Patzer	Jim Sosiak	Yellowknife

== Round-robin standings ==
Final round-robin standings

Key
Teams to Playoffs

Skip	W	L
Jamie Koe	4	0
Greg Skauge	3	1
Glen Hudy	2	2
D'arcy Delorey	1	3
Keith Dohey	0	4

== Round-robin results ==
All draws are listed in Eastern Time (UTC−05:00).

=== Draw 1 ===
Thursday, January 30, 5:30 pm

Sheet 1	1	2	3	4	5	6	7	8	9	10	Final
Glen Hudy	0	0	1	0	0	0	X	X	X	X	1
Jamie Koe	1	4	0	1	1	2	X	X	X	X	9

Sheet 2	1	2	3	4	5	6	7	8	9	10	Final
Keith Dohey	1	0	1	0	1	0	1	0	0	X	4
D'arcy Delorey	0	0	0	3	0	2	0	3	2	X	10

=== Draw 2 ===
Thursday, January 30, 10:00 pm

Sheet 2	1	2	3	4	5	6	7	8	9	10	Final
Greg Skauge	0	3	0	2	0	3	0	2	0	0	10
Glen Hudy	1	0	2	0	1	0	3	0	1	1	9

Sheet 3	1	2	3	4	5	6	7	8	9	10	Final
Jamie Koe	0	5	0	0	1	0	4	X	X	X	10
Keith Dohey	1	0	1	1	0	1	0	X	X	X	4

=== Draw 3 ===
Friday, January 31, 12:00 pm

Sheet 1	1	2	3	4	5	6	7	8	9	10	11	Final
D'arcy Delorey	0	2	1	0	0	1	0	2	0	1	0	7
Greg Skauge	1	0	0	1	1	0	2	0	2	0	3	10

Sheet 3	1	2	3	4	5	6	7	8	9	10	Final
Keith Dohey	0	0	0	0	1	0	1	0	X	X	2
Glen Hudy	0	0	2	2	0	3	0	1	X	X	8

=== Draw 4 ===
Friday, January 31, 5:00 pm

Sheet 1	1	2	3	4	5	6	7	8	9	10	Final
Greg Skauge	2	2	1	0	1	1	2	X	X	X	9
Keith Dohey	0	0	0	0	0	0	0	X	X	X	0

Sheet 3	1	2	3	4	5	6	7	8	9	10	Final
D'arcy Delorey	0	4	0	2	0	1	0	0	X	X	7
Jamie Koe	1	0	3	0	2	0	3	2	X	X	11

=== Draw 5 ===
Saturday, February 1, 11:00 am

Sheet 2	1	2	3	4	5	6	7	8	9	10	Final
Jamie Koe	0	1	1	3	0	0	0	1	1	X	7
Greg Skauge	2	0	0	0	2	0	0	0	0	X	4

Sheet 3	1	2	3	4	5	6	7	8	9	10	11	Final
Glen Hudy	0	0	1	0	3	0	1	0	1	0	1	7
D'arcy Delorey	0	0	0	1	0	1	0	2	0	2	0	6

== Playoffs ==
Semifinal			Final
			1	Jamie Koe	11
2	Greg Skauge	6	3	Glen Hudy	5
3	Glen Hudy	8

=== Semifinal ===
Saturday, February 1, 9:30 pm

Sheet 2	1	2	3	4	5	6	7	8	9	10	Final
Greg Skauge	1	0	0	0	0	0	1	1	3	0	6
Glen Hudy	0	0	1	1	1	3	0	0	0	2	8

=== Final ===
Sunday, February 2, 1:00 pm

Sheet 2	1	2	3	4	5	6	7	8	9	10	Final
Jamie Koe	0	3	0	0	3	3	0	2	X	X	11
Glen Hudy	1	0	2	1	0	0	1	0	X	X	5

2020 NWT Men's Championship
(Northwest Territories)
Jamie Koe
14th NWT Championship title
