= 2024 Northwest Territories Men's Curling Championship =

- Host city: Inuvik, Northwest Territories
- Arena: Inuvik Curling Club
- Dates: January 25–26
- Winner: Team Koe
- Curling club: Yellowknife CC, Yellowknife
- Skip: Jamie Koe
- Second: Cole Parsons
- Lead: Shadrach McLeod
- Alternate: Glen Kennedy (Note: Team Koe played with three players.)
- Finalist: Nick Saturnino

The 2024 Northwest Territories Men's Curling Championship, the men's territorial curling championship for the Northwest Territories, was held from January 25 to 26 at the Inuvik Curling Club in Inuvik, Northwest Territories. The winning Jamie Koe rink represented the Northwest Territories at the 2024 Montana's Brier in Regina, Saskatchewan where they finished third in Pool B with a 5–3 record and made it past pool play for the first time since 2012 (as Northwest Territories/Yukon). They would lose 7–0 to host Saskatchewan in the Page 3v4 qualifier.

With only two teams, Jamie Koe and Nick Saturnino entering the event, the format was a best three out of five series. Jamie Koe won the series 3 games to none.

== Teams ==
The teams are listed as follows:

Skip	Third	Second	Lead	Alternate	Club
Jamie Koe	–	Cole Parsons	Shadrach McLeod	Glen Kennedy	Yellowknife CC, Yellowknife
Nick Saturnino	Mark Robertson	Stephen Robertson	Grant Convey		Inuvik CC, Inuvik

== Results ==
All draw times are listed in Mountain Standard Time (UTC−07:00).

=== Draw 1 ===
Thursday, January 25, 7:30 pm

Sheet B	1	2	3	4	5	6	7	8	9	10	Final
Jamie Koe	2	1	0	3	0	2	0	0	0	1	9
Nick Saturnino	0	0	2	0	1	0	1	1	2	0	7

=== Draw 2 ===
Friday, January 26, 10:00 am

Sheet B	1	2	3	4	5	6	7	8	9	10	Final
Nick Saturnino	0	0	1	0	1	0	0	X	X	X	2
Jamie Koe	0	1	0	3	0	1	3	X	X	X	8

=== Draw 3 ===
Friday, January 26, 3:30 pm

Sheet B	1	2	3	4	5	6	7	8	9	10	Final
Jamie Koe	1	0	0	2	1	1	0	0	1	2	8
Nick Saturnino	0	3	1	0	0	0	0	1	0	0	5

2024 Northwest Territories Men's Curling Championship
(Northwest Territories)
Jamie Koe
17th Territorial Championship title
