= 2022 Northwest Territories Men's Curling Championship =

- Host city: Yellowknife, Northwest Territories
- Arena: Yellowknife Curling Centre
- Dates: February 9–13
- Winner: Team Koe
- Curling club: Yellowknife Curling Centre, Yellowknife
- Skip: Jamie Koe
- Third: Glen Kennedy
- Second: Cole Parsons
- Lead: Shadrach Mcleod
- Finalist: Greg Skauge

The 2022 Northwest Territories Men's Curling Championship, the men's territorial curling championship for the Northwest Territories, was held from February 9 to 13 at the Yellowknife Curling Centre in Yellowknife, Northwest Territories. The winning Jamie Koe rink represented the Northwest Territories at the 2022 Tim Hortons Brier in Lethbridge, Alberta.

Teams played a double round robin, followed by a page playoff involving all four teams.

== Teams ==
The teams are listed as follows:

Skip	Third	Second	Lead	Locale
D'arcy Delorey	Patrick Cove	Glenn Smith	Bruce Power	Hay River
Jamie Koe	Glen Kennedy	Cole Parsons	Shadrach Mcleod	Yellowknife
Mason MacNeil	Kaleb Picek	John Voudrach	Kolsen Church	Inuvik
Greg Skauge	Tom Naugler	Brad Patzer	Robert Borden	Yellowknife

== Round-robin standings ==
Final round-robin standings

Skip	W	L	PF	PA	EW	EL	BE	SE
Jamie Koe	6	0	58	18	27	15	2	15
Greg Skauge	4	2	49	33	27	20	0	13
D'arcy Delorey	2	4	43	35	27	19	2	15
Mason MacNeil	0	6	10	74	9	36	1	0

== Round-robin results ==
All draw times are listed in Mountain Standard Time (UTC−07:00).

=== Draw 1 ===
Wednesday, February 9, 2:30 pm

Sheet B	1	2	3	4	5	6	7	8	9	10	11	Final
D'arcy Delorey	1	0	1	0	0	2	0	2	1	1	0	8
Greg Skauge	0	3	0	2	1	0	2	0	0	0	2	10

Sheet C	1	2	3	4	5	6	7	8	9	10	Final
Jamie Koe	4	1	1	0	5	0	2	3	X	X	16
Mason MacNeil	0	0	0	1	0	1	0	0	X	X	2

=== Draw 2 ===
Wednesday, February 10, 9:00 am

Sheet B	1	2	3	4	5	6	7	8	9	10	Final
Mason MacNeil	1	0	0	0	1	0	1	0	0	X	3
D'arcy Delorey	0	0	3	1	0	4	0	1	4	X	13

Sheet C	1	2	3	4	5	6	7	8	9	10	Final
Greg Skauge	4	0	0	1	0	0	0	0	0	X	5
Jamie Koe	0	0	2	0	2	1	1	2	2	X	10

=== Draw 3 ===
Thursday, February 10, 2:30 pm

Sheet B	1	2	3	4	5	6	7	8	9	10	Final
Greg Skauge	3	1	1	0	1	1	2	1	X	X	10
Mason MacNeil	0	0	0	1	0	0	0	0	X	X	1

Sheet C	1	2	3	4	5	6	7	8	9	10	Final
Jamie Koe	0	6	1	0	0	0	X	X	X	X	7
D'arcy Delorey	1	0	0	0	1	1	X	X	X	X	3

=== Draw 4 ===
Friday, February 11, 9:00 am

Sheet B	1	2	3	4	5	6	7	8	9	10	Final
D'arcy Delorey	1	1	0	0	1	0	0	1	0	X	4
Jamie Koe	0	0	1	3	0	0	2	0	2	X	8

Sheet C	1	2	3	4	5	6	7	8	9	10	Final
Mason MacNeil	0	1	0	0	0	0	2	0	X	X	3
Grag Skauge	3	0	3	1	0	3	0	4	X	X	14

=== Draw 5 ===
Friday, February 11, 2:30 pm

Sheet B	1	2	3	4	5	6	7	8	9	10	Final
Jamie Koe	1	0	3	0	0	3	3	X	X	X	10
Greg Skauge	0	1	0	1	1	0	0	X	X	X	3

Sheet C	1	2	3	4	5	6	7	8	9	10	Final
D'arcy Delorey	1	1	2	4	2	1	2	1	X	X	14
Mason MacNeil	0	0	0	0	0	0	0	0	X	X	0

=== Draw 6 ===
Saturday, February 12, 11:00 am

Sheet B	1	2	3	4	5	6	7	8	9	10	Final
Mason MacNeil	0	1	0	0	0	0	X	X	X	X	1
Jamie Koe	1	0	1	1	2	2	X	X	X	X	7

Sheet C	1	2	3	4	5	6	7	8	9	10	Final
Greg Skauge	2	1	1	1	2	0	X	X	X	X	7
D'arcy Delorey	0	0	0	0	0	1	X	X	X	X	1

== Playoffs ==
Page playoff system
1	Jamie Koe	12
2	Greg Skauge	5
3	D'arcy Delorey	11
4	Mason MacNeil	7

Semifinal
2	Greg Skauge	11
3	D'arcy Delorey	3

Final
1	Jamie Koe	7
2	Greg Skauge	3

=== 1 vs. 2 ===
Saturday, February 12, 4:30 pm

Sheet B	1	2	3	4	5	6	7	8	9	10	Final
Jamie Koe	2	1	0	3	0	1	3	2	X	X	12
Greg Skauge	0	0	3	0	2	0	0	0	X	X	5

=== 3 vs. 4 ===
Saturday, February 12, 4:30 pm

Sheet C	1	2	3	4	5	6	7	8	9	10	Final
D'arcy Delorey	2	0	0	2	0	4	0	3	X	X	11
Mason MacNeil	0	0	2	0	3	0	2	0	X	X	7

=== Semifinal ===
Sunday, February 13, 11:00 am

Sheet B	1	2	3	4	5	6	7	8	9	10	Final
Greg Skauge	0	0	2	3	3	0	3	0	X	X	11
D'arcy Delorey	0	0	0	0	0	2	0	1	X	X	3

=== Final ===
Sunday, February 13, 4:30 pm

Sheet B	1	2	3	4	5	6	7	8	9	10	Final
Jamie Koe	1	0	0	2	1	0	0	2	1	X	7
Greg Skauge	0	1	1	0	0	0	1	0	0	X	3

2022 Northwest Territories Men's Curling Championship
(Northwest Territories)
Jamie Koe
15th NWT Territorial Championship title
