= 2009 Yukon/NWT Men's Curling Championship =

The 2009 Yukon/NWT Men's Curling Championship (Canada's men's territorial curling championship) was held February 12–15 at the Yellowknife Curling Club in Yellowknife, Northwest Territories. The winning Jamie Koe rink represented team Yukon/Northwest Territories at the 2009 Tim Hortons Brier in Calgary.

== Teams ==
Skip	Third	Second	Lead	Club
Chad Cowan	James Buyck	Wade Scoffin	Clint Ireland	Whitehorse Curling Club, Whitehorse
Jamie Koe	Jon Solberg	Brad Chorostkowski	Martin Gavin	Yellowknife Curling Club, Yellowknife
Darcy Moshenko	Tom Naugler	Robert Borden	Roshan Begg	Yellowknife Curling Club, Yellowknife
Greg Skauge	Brad Patzer	Derek Elkin	Jim Sosiak	Yellowknife Curling Club, Yellowknife

== Standings ==
Skip	W	L
Jamie Koe	5	1
Chad Cowan	3	3
Darcy Moshenko	2	4
Greg Skauge	2	4

== Results ==
=== Draw 1 ===
February 12, 1930

Team	1	2	3	4	5	6	7	8	9	10	Final
Jamie Koe	3	2	0	2	0	3	X	X	X	X	10
Greg Skauge	0	0	1	0	1	0	X	X	X	X	2

Team	1	2	3	4	5	6	7	8	9	10	Final
Chad Cowan	0	0	2	0	1	0	1	1	0	1	6
Darcy Moshenko	0	2	0	1	0	0	0	0	1	0	4

=== Draw 2 ===
February 13, 1000

Team	1	2	3	4	5	6	7	8	9	10	Final
Greg Skauge	1	0	0	0	0	1	1	0	X	X	3
Chad Cowan	0	2	0	2	1	0	0	4	X	X	9

Team	1	2	3	4	5	6	7	8	9	10	Final
Darcy Moshenko	1	0	0	0	2	0	2	0	1	1	7
Jamie Koe	0	3	0	2	0	2	0	2	0	0	9

=== Draw 3 ===
February 13, 1500

Team	1	2	3	4	5	6	7	8	9	10	Final
Greg Skauge	0	0	2	0	1	1	0	1	0	X	5
Jamie Koe	1	2	0	2	0	0	2	0	3	X	10

Team	1	2	3	4	5	6	7	8	9	10	Final
Darcy Moshenko	1	0	0	0	0	1	0	2	0	X	4
Chad Cowan	0	2	2	2	0	0	2	0	2	X	10

=== Draw 4 ===
February 14, 1000

Team	1	2	3	4	5	6	7	8	9	10	Final
Chad Cowan	1	0	1	0	0	1	0	0	1	X	4
Jamie Koe	0	2	0	1	2	0	0	2	0	X	7

Team	1	2	3	4	5	6	7	8	9	10	Final
Greg Skauge	2	2	0	0	2	0	3	1	X	X	10
Darcy Moshenko	0	0	3	1	0	2	0	0	X	X	6

=== Draw 5 ===
February 14, 1500

Team	1	2	3	4	5	6	7	8	9	10	Final
Chad Cowan	0	1	0	1	0	1	1	0	2	0	6
Greg Skauge	1	0	2	0	1	0	0	2	0	2	8

Team	1	2	3	4	5	6	7	8	9	10	11	Final
Jamie Koe	0	1	0	1	0	2	0	2	1	0	0	7
Darcy Moshenko	1	0	2	0	1	0	2	0	0	1	1	8

=== Draw 6 ===
February 15, 0900

Team	1	2	3	4	5	6	7	8	9	10	Final
Darcy Moshenko	2	0	0	1	0	2	1	3	X	X	9
Greg Skauge	0	1	1	0	1	0	0	0	X	X	3

Team	1	2	3	4	5	6	7	8	9	10	Final
Jamie Koe	1	0	0	2	0	0	0	2	1	X	6
Chad Cowan	0	1	1	0	1	1	0	0	0	X	4

== Sources ==
- Team lists provided by the Manager of the Yellowknife Curling Club via email.
