= 2010 Yukon/NWT Men's Curling Championship =

The 2010 Yukon/NWT Men's Curling Championship was held February 6–9 at the Whitehorse Curling Club in Whitehorse, Yukon. The winning team of Jamie Koe represented the Territories at the 2010 Tim Hortons Brier in Halifax, Nova Scotia.

== Teams ==
Skip	Third	Second	Lead	Territory
Chad Cowan	James Buyck	Wade Scoffin	Clint Ireland	Yukon
John Solberg	Bob Smallwood	Doug Gee	Darol Stuart	Yukon
Greg Skauge	Brad Patzer	Rod Pielak	Jim Sosiak	Northwest Territories
Jamie Koe	Kevin Whitehead	Brad Chorostkowski	Martin Gavin	Northwest Territories

== Standings ==
Skip	W	L
Jamie Koe (Yellowknife)	4	2
Chad Cowan	4	2
John Solberg	3	3
Greg Skauge	1	5

== Results ==
=== February 7 ===
Draw 1

- Koe 11-3 Skauge
- Cowan 8-4 Solberg

Draw 2

- Koe 9-3 Cowan
- Skauge 6-5 Solberg

Draw 3

- Cowan 9-7 Solberg
- Koe 5-4 Skauge

=== February 8 ===
Draw 4

- Cowan 6-3 Skauge
- Solberg 8-4 Koe

Draw 5

- Solberg 9-8 Skauge
- Koe 7-5 Cowan

=== February 9 ===
Draw 6

- Cowan 5-4 Skauge
- Solberg 8-7 Koe

=== Tie breaker ===
- Koe 5-3 Cowan
