= Chris Schille =

Canadian curler

- Curler
- Born: February 19, 1983 (age 43); Barrhead, Alberta

Curling career
- Brier: 6 (2007, 2008, 2013, 2016, 2017, 2018)
Medal record
Men's curling
Representing Newfoundland and Labrador
Tim Hortons Brier
Silver medal – second place	2007 Hamilton

Christopher Schille (born February 19, 1983, in Barrhead, Alberta) is a Canadian curler from Red Deer, Alberta.

== Curling career ==
Schille grew up in Alberta, where he had a successful junior career, skipping the Alberta team to a 7–5 record at the 2004 Canadian Junior Curling Championships. Following Juniors, he played third for Rob Armitage during the 2004-05 season. The following season, he formed his own team before heading east to play second for 2006 Olympic champion Brad Gushue out of St. John's, Newfoundland and Labrador. In 2008 he was replaced by Ryan Fry and Schille returned to Alberta to form his own team.

Schille's move to Newfoundland to play for the Gushue rink followed the departure of Russ Howard. The team made it to the 2007 Tim Hortons Brier where they lost to Ontario (skipped by Russ' brother, Glenn) in the final. The team qualified for the 2008 Tim Hortons Brier as well, but has less success, losing in the tie-breaker game to British Columbia (Bob Ursel).

In 2008, Schille teamed up with 2-time Canadian Junior Champion Charley Thomas, who would throw last rocks for the team, while Schille skipped. The new team had some limited success on the World Curling Tour. Thomas left the team in 2009, and in 2010 Schille joined forces with Don Walchuk as his third. Schille played one season with Walchuk before leaving for Saskatchewan to play second for Brock Virtue. Schille would win his first Saskatchewan men's championship in 2013 as a member of this team. The team represented Saskatchewan at the 2013 Tim Hortons Brier, finishing with a record of 5–6. During the 2013 provincial championship, Schille was ejected from a playoff game due to foul language. This is thought to be the first player ejection in competitive curling in 30 years.

Schille returned to the Brier in 2016 as third for the Jamie Koe rink from the Northwest Territories. He played for the Northwest Territories again in the 2017 and 2018 Briers.

Schille was again caught up in controversy at the 2018 Red Deer Curling Classic. Before a match, the Koe rink got extremely drunk and disorderly, and were disqualified from the tournament, and banned from future Red Deer Curling Classics.

== Personal life ==
Schille is employed as a business owner of Flooring Superstores. He has one child.
