= Brad Chorostkowski =

Canadian curler

- Curler
- Born: September 5, 1973 (age 53); Yellowknife, Northwest Territories

Team
- Curling club: Yellowknife CC, Yellowknife, NT

Curling career
- Brier: 14 (1998, 2001, 2006, 2007, 2009, 2010, 2011, 2012, 2013, 2014, 2015, 2016, 2017, 2018)

Bradley Chorostkowski (born September 5, 1973) is a Canadian curler from Yellowknife, Northwest Territories. Over the course of his career, Chorostkowski has played in more games at the Brier than any other curler from the Northwest Territories.

Chorostkowski played in his first Brier in 1998, playing second for the Trevor Alexander rink, representing the combined Northwest Territories/Yukon team. The team finished the round robin with a 1–10 record, in last place. Chorostkowski returned to the Brier in 2001 playing second for Steve Moss. The Territories team again finished in last place, this time with an 0–11 record.

Chorostkowski would later join the Jamie Koe rink as his lead. The team would play in the 2006 Tim Hortons Brier, finishing with a respectable 6–5 record, narrowly missing the playoffs. Chorostkowski would go on to play with Koe at the 2007 (5–6), 2009 (3–8), 2010 (1–10), 2011 (3–8), 2012 (7–4; lost 3 vs. 4 game and bronze medal game), 2013 (5–6), 2014 (3–8), 2015 (0–11, as team Northwest Territories) and 2016 Briers, playing lead again in 2007 before being promoted to second in 2009.

== Personal life ==
Chorostkowski is the owner of J&R Mechanical. He is married to Christina Chorostkowski and has two children.
