= Jamie Koe =

Canadian curler (born 1977)

- Curler
- Born: November 3, 1977 (age 49); Yellowknife, Northwest Territories

Team
- Curling club: Yellowknife CC, Yellowknife
- Skip: Jamie Koe
- Third: Glen Kennedy
- Second: Roland Robinson
- Lead: Shadrach Mcleod
- Alternate: Stephen Robertson

Curling career
- Member Association: Northwest Territories
- Brier: 18 (2006, 2007, 2009, 2010, 2011, 2012, 2013, 2014, 2015, 2016, 2017, 2018, 2019, 2020, 2022, 2023, 2024, 2026)
- Top CTRS ranking: 17th (2003–04)
Medal record
Representing Northwest Territories
Men's Curling
Arctic Winter Games
Silver medal – second place	Slave Lake 1994

Jamie Koe (born November 3, 1977) is a Canadian curler. He has played in 14 Briers representing the Northwest Territories/Yukon team and three Briers representing just the Northwest Territories. At the 2012 Brier, he became the first skip from Canada's north to make the playoffs at the Brier since the addition of the playoffs in 1980.

He is the younger brother of Alberta curler Kevin Koe and twin brother of Territories champion Kerry Galusha.

== Career ==
=== Junior career ===
Koe played in five straight Canadian Junior Curling Championships, from 1994 to 1998. In 1994, he played third for his brother, Kevin, representing the Yukon/Northwest Territories team. The rink lost in the final to Alberta. In 1995, Kevin graduated from juniors, leaving Jamie to skip the team. He would skip the Territories to a 2–9 record at the 1995 Canadian Juniors. In 1996, each territory got their own team, and Koe would skip the Northwest Territories team. The rink finished the round robin with a 7–5 record, and would win one and lose one tiebreaker match. In 1997, Koe's Northwest Territories team finished the round robin in 2nd place at 8-4, but lost to Ontario's John Morris in the semifinal. In his final juniors in 1998, Koe missed the playoffs, skipping the Northwest Territories to a 5–7 record.

=== Men's career ===
After juniors, Koe moved to Alberta for school, and would team up with his brother again. However, he would soon move back to his native Northwest Territories.

Koe won his first Territories men's championship in 2006, sending him to his first Tim Hortons Brier. His 6-5 record at the 2006 Tim Hortons Brier was good enough for 5th place, the best finish for the Territories since 1975. Koe would represent the Territories again in 2007, 2009, 2010, 2011, 2012, 2013 and 2014. Koe got to play his brother for the first time at a Brier in 2010, when Kevin won the Alberta provincial championship for the first time. It was only the third time in Brier history where two brothers would compete against each other as skips.

Koe's best performance at the Brier was at the 2012 Tim Hortons Brier, where he finished 7-4 in the round robin, securing the 4th place spot in the playoffs. However, he lost both his playoff matches, settling for fourth place. He lost to his brother Kevin's Alberta rink in the 3 vs. 4 game, and then lost to Manitoba's Rob Fowler in an extra end in the bronze medal game. Koe returned to the Brier in 2013 where he could not repeat his success, but still posted a decent 5-6 record.

Beginning with the 2015 Tim Hortons Brier, each of Canada's three territories received separate entries into the Brier. Koe represented the Northwest Territories in that Brier, finishing in last place. This put the territory into the "relegation round" at the 2016 Tim Hortons Brier. Koe again represented the NWT at that Brier. He won the relegation round playoff, putting his team in the main event, where they finished with a 3–8 record. Koe would represent the Northwest Territories at the 2017 and 2018 Briers.

Koe and his rink of Chris Schille, D. J. Kidby and spare Ryan Fry caused controversy at the 2018 Red Deer Curling Classic for unacceptable behaviour including being clearly intoxicated, using foul language, trashing the locker room and damaging other curler's property and fixtures in the locker room. The team was ejected from the tournament and banned from all future tournaments.

Koe apologized for the team's actions despite not being involved in the incident; in statements and witness reports afterwards, Koe revealed he was dealing with issues with alcohol use and in a statement said “I will be taking steps to ensure this never happens again.” Koe had previously decided not to play in the final game: after attempting one practice slide, he determined he was too drunk to play.

Following the incident, Koe formed a brand new team to play in the Northwest Territories championship and 2019 Tim Hortons Brier with David Aho, Matt Ng and Cole Parsons. Representing the Northwest Territories at the Brier, Koe led his team to a 1–6 record. The following season, the team finished 2–5 at the 2020 Tim Hortons Brier in Kingston, Ontario.

== Personal life ==
Koe was the Chief Operating Officer for the Gwich'in Tribal Council until his dismissal in 2025. He is currently the CEO of Treaty 8 First Nations of Alberta. He is married and has two children.
