= Yukon Men's Curling Championship =

Men's territorial championship for men's curling in Yukon

The Yukon Men's Curling Championship is the men's territorial championship for men's curling in the Yukon. Beginning in 2015, the event serves as a direct qualifier to the Tim Hortons Brier, Canada's national men's curling championships. Prior to 2015, the event served as a qualifier for the Yukon/NWT Men's Curling Championship.

== Winners (2015–present) ==
Event	Winning team	Winning club	City	Runner-up team(s)	Host	Brier rec.
2026	Thomas Scoffin, Kerr Drummond, Trygg Jensen, Joe Wallingham	Whitehorse Curling Club	Whitehorse	Dean Grindheim, Tyler Williams, Trent Derkatch, Sean Eichendorf	Whitehorse	16th (1–7)
2025	Thomas Scoffin, Kerr Drummond, Trygg Jensen, Joe Wallingham	Whitehorse Curling Club	Whitehorse	Dustin Mikkelsen, Alexander Peech, Brandon Hagen, Robert McKinnon, Ray Mikkelsen	Whitehorse	11th (4–4)
2024	Thomas Scoffin, Trygg Jensen, Joe Wallingham, Evan Latos	Whitehorse Curling Club	Whitehorse	Dustin Mikkelsen, Alexander Peech, Brandon Hagen, Trent Derkatch; and Tyler Williams, Kevin Yost, Matthew Johnson, Scott Williamson (tie)	Whitehorse	15th (2–6)
2023	Thomas Scoffin, Trygg Jensen, Joe Wallingham, Evan Latos	Whitehorse Curling Club	Whitehorse	Andrew Komlodi, Terry Miller, Peter Andersen, Doug Hamilton	Whitehorse	14th (2–6)
2022	Thomas Scoffin, Trygg Jensen, Joe Wallingham, Evan Latos	Whitehorse Curling Club	Whitehorse			17th (1–7)
2021	Dustin Mikkelsen, Alexx Peech, Brandon Hagen, Robert McKinnon, Ray Mikkelsen	Whitehorse Curling Club	Whitehorse	No other entries	N/A	T-17th (0–8)
2020	Thomas Scoffin, Brett Winfield, Trygg Jensen, Joe Wallingham	Whitehorse Curling Club	Whitehorse	Pat Paslawski, Terry Miller, Doug Hamilton, Don McPhee	Whitehorse	T-15th (0–7)
2019	Jon Solberg, Bob Smallwood, Clinton Abel, Scott Odian	Whitehorse Curling Club	Whitehorse	Thomas Scoffin, Tom Appleman, Trygg Jensen, Joe Wallingham	Whitehorse	T-11th (3–4)
2018	Thomas Scoffin, Tom Appelman, Wade Scoffin, Steve Fecteau	Whitehorse Curling Club	Whitehorse	Jon Solberg, Craig Kochan, Dustin Mikkelsen, Brandon Hagen	Whitehorse	15th (2–6)
2017	Jon Solberg, Craig Kochan, Ray Mikkelsen, Darrin Frederickson	Whitehorse Curling Club	Whitehorse	Brent Pierce, Wade Scoffin, Steve Fecteau, Clint Ireland	Whitehorse	13th (2–2)
2016	Bob Smallwood, Jon Solberg, Clint Abel, Scott Odian	Whitehorse Curling Club	Whitehorse	Matthew Blandford, Wade Scoffin, Verner Janz, Clint Ireland	Whitehorse	14th (1–2)
2015	Bob Smallwood, Wade Scoffin, Steve Fecteau, Clint Ireland	Whitehorse Curling Club	Whitehorse	Pat Paslawski, Doug Hamilton, Trent Derkatch, David Rach	Whitehorse	13th (1–2)

== Winners (up to 2015) ==
The following teams won the Yukon playdowns for the Territorial men's curling championship. These teams were known as "Yukon #1" at the Territories championships. The runner up team also qualified for the territorial championship and was known as "Yukon #2".

Event	Winning team
2014	Pat Paslawski, Doug Hamilton, Alexander Peech, Trent Derkatch
2013	No event: no teams entered
2012	George Hilderman, Gord Zealand, Pat Molloy, Bob Walker
2011	Jon Solberg, Doug Gee, Clint Ireland, Darol Stuart
2010	Chad Cowan, James Buyck, Wade Scoffin, Clint Ireland
2009	Chad Cowan, James Buyck, Wade Scoffin, Clint Ireland
2008	Jon Solberg, Clint Abel, Doug Gee, Gordon Puddister
2007	Wade Scoffin, James Buyck, Ray Mikkelsen, Clint Ireland
2006	Chad Cowan, Wade Scoffin, James Buyck, Ross Milward
2005	Chad Cowan, Wade Scoffin, James Buyck, Ross Milward
2004	Chad Cowan, Wade Scoffin, James Buyck, Ross Milward
2003	Chad Cowan, Doug Bryant, James Buyck, Ross Milward
2002	Jon Solberg, Wade Scoffin, Ray Mikkelsen, Darol Stuart
