= 2025 Yukon Men's Curling Championship =

Canadian territorial men's curling championship

- Host city: Whitehorse, Yukon
- Arena: Whitehorse Curling Club
- Dates: January 10–11
- Winner: Team Scoffin
- Curling club: Whitehorse CC, Whitehorse
- Skip: Thomas Scoffin
- Third: Kerr Drummond
- Second: Trygg Jensen
- Lead: Joe Wallingham
- Finalist: Dustin Mikkelsen

The 2025 Yukon Men's Curling Championship, the men's territorial curling championship for Yukon, was held from January 10 to 11 at the Whitehorse Curling Club in Whitehorse, Yukon. The winning Thomas Scoffin rink represented Yukon at the 2025 Montana's Brier in Kelowna, British Columbia. The event was held in conjunction with the 2025 Yukon Scotties Tournament of Hearts, the territorial women's championship.

Since only two teams entered the territorial championship, the event was held in a best-of-5 format, with Scoffin winning 3–0 over the Dustin Mikkelsen rink.

== Teams ==
The teams are as follows:

Skip	Third	Second	Lead	Alternate	Club
Dustin Mikkelsen	Alexander Peech	Brandon Hagen	Robert McKinnon	Ray Mikkelsen	Whitehorse CC
Thomas Scoffin	Kerr Drummond	Trygg Jensen	Joe Wallingham		Whitehorse CC

== Scores ==
All draw times are listed in Mountain Time (UTC-07:00).

=== Draw 1 ===
Friday, January 10, 1:00 pm

Team	1	2	3	4	5	6	7	8	9	10	Final
Thomas Scoffin	2	0	0	0	1	1	0	2	0	1	7
Dustin Mikkelsen	0	0	0	1	0	0	1	0	2	0	4

=== Draw 2 ===
Saturday, January 11, 9:00 am

Team	1	2	3	4	5	6	7	8	9	10	Final
Thomas Scoffin	0	1	2	1	1	0	0	2	X	X	7
Dustin Mikkelsen	1	0	0	0	0	1	0	0	X	X	2

=== Draw 3 ===
Saturday, January 11, 2:00 pm

Team	1	2	3	4	5	6	7	8	9	10	Final
Thomas Scoffin	2	0	2	1	0	0	3	0	X	X	8
Dustin Mikkelsen	0	1	0	0	2	0	0	1	X	X	4

2025 Yukon Men's Curling Championship
(Yukon)
Thomas Scoffin
6th Territorial Championship title
