= 2026 Yukon Men's Curling Championship =

Canadian territorial men's curling championship

- Host city: Whitehorse, Yukon
- Arena: Whitehorse Curling Club
- Dates: January 8–10
- Winner: Team Scoffin
- Curling club: Whitehorse CC
- Skip: Thomas Scoffin
- Third: Kerr Drummond
- Second: Trygg Jensen
- Lead: Joe Wallingham
- Finalist: Dean Grindheim

The 2026 Yukon Men's Curling Championship, the men's territorial curling championship for Yukon, were held from January 8 to 10 at the Whitehorse Curling Club in Whitehorse, Yukon. The winning Thomas Scoffin rink represented Yukon at the 2026 Montana's Brier in St. John's, Newfoundland and Labrador.

== Teams ==
The teams are as follows:

Skip	Third	Second	Lead	Alternate	Club
Dean Grindheim	Tyler Williams	Trent Derkatch	Sean Eichendorf		Whitehorse CC
Thomas Scoffin	Kerr Drummond	Trygg Jensen	Joe Wallingham	Ben Robinson	Whitehorse CC
Scott Williamson	Kyle McCooey				Whitehorse CC

== Round robin standings ==
Final Round Robin Standings

Key
Champions

Skip	W	L	PF	PA	EW	EL	BE	SE
Thomas Scoffin	4	0	41	10	18	9	0	10
Dean Grindheim	2	2	22	30	13	18	0	2
Scott Williamson	0	4	15	38	12	14	2	1

== Round robin results ==
All draw times are listed in Mountain Time (UTC-07:00).

=== Draw 1 ===
Thursday, January 8, 2:00 pm

Sheet A	1	2	3	4	5	6	7	8	9	10	Final
Thomas Scoffin	0	0	3	1	0	4	0	2	X	X	10
Dean Grindheim 🔨	1	2	0	0	1	0	1	0	X	X	5

=== Draw 2 ===
Friday, January 9, 9:00 am

Sheet A	1	2	3	4	5	6	7	8	9	10	Final
Scott Williamson 🔨	1	0	0	0	1	0	X	X	X	X	2
Thomas Scoffin	0	3	5	3	0	2	X	X	X	X	13

=== Draw 3 ===
Friday, January 9, 2:00 pm

Sheet A	1	2	3	4	5	6	7	8	9	10	Final
Dean Grindheim 🔨	2	0	1	0	1	0	3	0	0	X	7
Scott Williamson	0	1	0	1	0	1	0	2	1	X	6

=== Draw 4 ===
Saturday, January 10, 9:00 am

Sheet A	1	2	3	4	5	6	7	8	9	10	Final
Dean Grindheim 🔨	0	1	0	0	0	0	0	X	X	X	1
Thomas Scoffin	1	0	2	1	1	1	3	X	X	X	9

=== Draw 5 ===
Saturday, January 10, 2:00 pm

Sheet A	1	2	3	4	5	6	7	8	9	10	Final
Scott Williamson 🔨	2	0	2	0	0	0	1	0	0	X	5
Dean Grindheim	0	2	0	5	0	0	0	1	1	X	9

=== Draw 6 ===
Saturday, January 10, 7:00 pm

Sheet A	1	2	3	4	5	6	7	8	9	10	Final
Thomas Scoffin 🔨	2	2	0	3	2	0	X	X	X	X	9
Scott Williamson	0	0	1	0	0	1	X	X	X	X	2

== Playoffs ==
No playoffs were needed as Thomas Scoffin went unbeaten in round robin play.

2026 Yukon Men's Curling Championship
(Yukon)
Thomas Scoffin
7th Territorial Championship title
