= 2019 Yukon Men's Curling Championship =

- Host city: Whitehorse, Yukon
- Arena: Whitehorse Curling Club
- Dates: February 7–10, 2019
- Winner: Team Solberg
- Curling club: Whitehorse CC, Whitehorse, Yukon
- Skip: Jon Solberg
- Third: Bob Smallwood
- Second: Clinton Abel
- Lead: Scott Odian
- Finalist: Thomas Scoffin

The 2019 Yukon Men's Curling Championship, the territorial men's curling championship for Yukon was held February 7 to 10 at the Whitehorse Curling Club in Whitehorse, Yukon. The winning Jon Solberg team represented the Yukon at the 2019 Tim Hortons Brier, Canada's national men's curling championship.

== Teams ==
Three teams entered the event:

Skip	Third	Second	Lead	Locale
Pat Paslawski	Terry Miller	Doug Hamilton	Don McPhee	Whitehorse
Thomas Scoffin	Tom Appelman	Trygg Jensen	Joe Wallingham	Whitehorse
Jon Solberg	Bob Smallwood	Clinton Abel	Scott Odian	Whitehorse

== Draw ==
As there were three teams that entered, the event was a double round robin. If any team had gone undefeated, they would be declared the champions. However, since no team went undefeated a playoff between the top two teams occurred.

== Round robin standings ==
Key
To playoff

Skip	W	L
Solberg	3	1
Scoffin	2	2
Paslawski	1	3

== Scores ==
=== February 7 ===
Draw 1

- Paslawski 8–5 Scoffin

=== February 8 ===
Draw 2

- Solberg 11–4 Paslawski

Draw 3

- Solberg 8–6 Scoffin

=== February 9 ===
Draw 4

- Solberg 9–8 Paslawski

Draw 5

- Scoffin 8–3 Paslawski

Draw 6

- Scoffin 6–3 Solberg

== Playoff ==
Solberg must be beaten twice.

Semifinal			Final
			1	Jon Solberg
1	Jon Solberg	5	1	Jon Solberg
2	Thomas Scoffin	3

=== Semifinal ===
Sunday, February 10, 9:00am

Team	1	2	3	4	5	6	7	8	9	10	Final
Thomas Scoffin	1	0	0	0	0	2	0	0	0	0	3
Jon Solberg	0	0	0	0	2	0	0	1	1	1	5

=== Final ===
A final was not necessary as Solberg won the semifinal.
