= 2018 Yukon Men's Curling Championship =

- Host city: Whitehorse, Yukon
- Arena: Whitehorse Curling Club
- Dates: January 11–14, 2018
- Winner: Team Scoffin
- Curling club: Whitehorse CC, Whitehorse, Yukon
- Skip: Thomas Scoffin
- Third: Tom Appelman
- Second: Wade Scoffin
- Lead: Steve Fecteau
- Finalist: Jon Solberg

The 2018 Yukon Men's Curling Championship was held January 11 to 14 at the Whitehorse Curling Club in Whitehorse, Yukon. The winning Thomas Scoffin team represented the Yukon at the 2018 Tim Hortons Brier, Canada's national men's curling championship.

== Teams ==
Six teams entered the event:

Skip	Third	Second	Lead
Pat Paslawski	Terry Miller	Doug Hamilton	Don McPhee
Thomas Scoffin	Tom Appelman	Wade Scoffin	Steve Fecteau
Bob Smallwood	Alexx Peech	Clinton Abel	Scott Odian
Jon Solberg	Craig Kochan	Dustin Mikkelsen	Brandon Hagen
Tyler Williams	Kevin Yost	Trent Derkatch	Scott Williams
Gord Zealand	Don Duncan	David Rach	Gary Brown

- Team Solberg Are The Defending Champions

== Draw ==
Following new rules set out by the Yukon Curling Association, championships with 6-7 teams are to have a modified triple knock out format.

Brackets:

A Qualifier		Semifinals		A Final
		Pat Paslawski	4
Bob Smallwood	7	Bob Smallwood	6
Gord Zealand	3			Bob Smallwood	9
Thomas Scoffin	3			Jon Solberg	4
Tyler Williams	4	Jon Solberg	9
		Tyler Williams	2

B Qualifier
Gord Zealand	5
Tyler Williams	6
Thomas Scoffin	9
Pat Paslawski	7

Semifinals
Tyler Williams	4
Bob Smallwood	10
Thomas Scoffin	5
Jon Solberg	6

B Final
Bob Smallwood	6
Jon Solberg	8

C Qualifier
Pat Paslawski	11
Tyler Williams	12
Gord Zealand	3
Thomas Scoffin	9

Semifinals
Jon Solberg	5
Tyler Williams	2
Bob Smallwood	2
Thomas Scoffin	8

C Final
Jon Solberg	1
Thomas Scoffin	8

== Playoffs ==
Since Team Solberg played in every qualifying game for the playoffs, Team Solberg earns the bye to the final

Semifinal			Final
			B	Jon Solberg	5
A	Bob Smallwood	4	C	Thomas Scoffin	8
C	Thomas Scoffin	8

=== Semifinal ===
Sunday, January 14, 8:30 am

Team	1	2	3	4	5	6	7	8	9	10	Final
Bob Smallwood	1	0	1	0	1	0	0	1	0	X	4
Thomas Scoffin	0	2	0	2	0	1	2	0	1	X	8

=== Game #2 ===
Sunday, January 14, 2:30 pm

Team	1	2	3	4	5	6	7	8	9	10	Final
Jon Solberg	0	1	0	0	2	0	1	0	1	X	5
Thomas Scoffin	0	0	0	5	0	2	0	1	0	X	8

2018 Yukon Men's Curling Championship

Thomas Scoffin
1st Yukon Men's Curling Championship title
