= 2015 Yukon Men's Curling Championship =

- Host city: Whitehorse, Yukon
- Arena: Whitehorse Curling Club
- Dates: January 9–15, 2015
- Winner: Team Smallwood
- Skip: Bob Smallwood
- Third: Wade Scoffin
- Second: Steve Fecteau
- Lead: Clint Ireland

The 2015 Yukon Men's Curling Championship was held January 9 to 15 at the Whitehorse Curling Club in Whitehorse, Yukon. It was the first territorial men's championship to be held since the Yukon gained a direct entry to the Brier, Canada's national men's curling championship. Prior to 2015, the top two teams in the territory played in the Yukon/NWT Men's Curling Championship, with the winner going to the Brier. The winning team represented the Yukon at the 2015 Tim Hortons Brier.

== Teams ==
Six teams entered the event:

Skip	Third	Second	Lead
Tyler Williams	Wade Kopan	Richard Weihers	Bob Walker
Bob Smallwood	Wade Scoffin	Steve Fecteau	Clint Ireland
Ray Mikkelsen	Dustin Mikkelsen	Scott Williamson	Darrin Frederickson
Pat Paslawski	Doug Hamilton	Trent Derkatch	David Rach
Walter Wallingham	Gordon Zealand	Herbert Balsam	Don Duncan
George Hilderman	Doug Gee	Jon Solberg	Dale Enzenauer

== Standings ==
Skip	W	L
Smallwood	5	0
Paslawski	4	1
Wallingham	2	3
Hilderman	2	3
Mikkelsen	2	3
Williams	0	5

== Scores ==
=== January 9 ===
Draw 1

- Hilderman 14-1 Williams
- Paslawski 8-4 Mikkelsen
- Smallwood 9-4 Wallingham

Draw 2

- Smallwood 7-2 Paslawski
- Wallingham 9-5 Hilderman
- Mikkelsen 9-3 Williams

=== January 10 ===
Draw 3

- Wallingham 7-5 Williams
- Smallwood 9-4 Mikkelsen
- Paslawski 8-7 Hilderman

Draw 4

- Hilderman 10-5 Mikkelsen
- Paslawski 11-8 Wallingham
- Smallwood 10-8 Williams

=== January 11 ===
Draw 5

- Smallwood 7 - Hilderman 6
- Williams 4 - Paslawski 6
- Mikkelsen 5 - Wallingham 4
