= 2020 Yukon Men's Curling Championship =

- Host city: Whitehorse, Yukon
- Arena: Whitehorse Curling Club
- Dates: January 24–26, 2020
- Winner: Team Scoffin
- Skip: Thomas Scoffin
- Third: Brett Winfield
- Second: Trygg Jensen
- Lead: Joe Wallingham
- Coach: Wade Scoffin
- Finalist: Pat Paslawski

The 2020 Yukon Men's Curling Championship, the territorial men's curling championship for Yukon was held from January 24 to 26 at the Whitehorse Curling Club in Whitehorse, Yukon. The winning Thomas Scoffin rink represented the Yukon at the 2020 Tim Hortons Brier in Kingston, Ontario and finished with a 0–7 record.

== Teams ==
Three teams entered the event:

Skip	Third	Second	Lead
Pat Paslawski	Terry Miller	Doug Hamilton	Don McPhee
Thomas Scoffin	Brett Winfield	Trygg Jensen	Joe Wallingham
Darol Stuart	Herb Balsam	Bob Walker	Lee Malanchuk

== Draw ==
The event is a double round robin. If any team goes undefeated, they would be declared the champions. If no team goes undefeated, a playoff will occur between each of the three teams. If one team has three or more losses, then there will be a playoff with the top two teams (with the first place team needing to be beaten twice).

The first game of the event was scheduled for 9:00am on January 24, but was postponed to 7:00pm due to compressor issues.

== Round-robin standings ==
As of Draw 4

Skip	W	L
Scoffin	4	0
Paslawski	1	2
Stuart	0	3

The Thomas Scoffin Rink went 4-0 in the round robin and will represent Yukon at the 2020 Brier.
