= 2016 Yukon Men's Curling Championship =

- Host city: Whitehorse, Yukon
- Arena: Whitehorse Curling Club
- Dates: January 15–17, 2016
- Winner: Team Smallwood
- Skip: Bob Smallwood
- Third: Jon Solberg
- Second: Clint Abel
- Lead: Scott Odian
- Alternate: David Rach

The 2016 Yukon Men's Curling Championship was held January 15 to 17 at the Whitehorse Curling Club in Whitehorse, Yukon. The winning Bob Smallwood team represented the Yukon at the 2016 Tim Hortons Brier.

Smallwood qualified for his second straight Brier on the last day of competition, defeating the only other undefeated team, the Matthew Blandford rink.

== Teams ==
Six teams entered the event:

Skip	Third	Second	Lead	Alternate
Herb Balsam	Cole Hume	Scott Boone	Wesley Huston	
Matthew Blandford	Wade Scoffin	Verner Janz	Clinton Ireland	Steve Fecteau
Dustin Mikkelsen	Scott Williamson	Branden Hayen	Scott Cole	
Pat Paslawski	Richard Weihers	Tyler Williams	Trent Derkatch	Doug Hamilton
Bob Smallwood	Jon Solberg	Clint Abel	Scott Odian	David Rach
Walter Wallingham	Gord Zealand	Ed Kormendy	Don Duncan	Dale Enzenauer

== Standings ==
Key
Champion

Skip	W	L
Smallwood	5	0
Blandford	4	1
Paslawski	3	2
Wallingham	2	3
Mikkelsen	1	4
Balsam	0	5

== Scores ==
=== January 15 ===
Draw 1

- Blandford 13-2 Balsam
- Paslawski 9-2 Mikkelsen
- Smallwood 9-7 Wallingham

Draw 2

- Smallwood 7-3 Paslawski
- Blandford 9-8 Wallingham
- Mikkelsen 8-7 Balsam

=== January 16 ===
Draw 3

- Wallingham 12-2 Balsam
- Smallwood 7-6 Mikkelsen
- Blandford 14-9 Paslawski

Draw 4

- Blandford 10-2 Mikkelsen
- Paslawski 9-8 Wallingham
- Smallwood 9-2 Balsam

=== January 17 ===
Draw 5

- Smallwood 9-6 Blandford
- Paslawski 8-3 Balsam
- Wallingham 4-3 Mikkelsen
