= 2011 Yukon/NWT Men's Curling Championship =

The 2011 Yukon/NWT Men's Curling Championship was held February 10–13 at the Yellowknife Curling Club in Yellowknife, Northwest Territories. The winning team of Jamie Koe will represent Yukon/NWT at the 2011 Tim Hortons Brier in London, Ontario.

== Teams ==
Skip	Third	Second	Lead	Club(s)
Jamie Koe	Tom Naugler	Brad Chorostkowski	Martin Gavin	Yellowknife CC
Steve Moss	Brad Patzer	Cory Vanthuyne	Robert Borden	Yellowknife CC
Jon Solberg	Doug Gee	Clint Ireland	Darol Stuart	Whitehorse CC
John Yeulet	Herb Balsam	Bob Walker	Gord Zealand	Whitehorse CC

== Standings ==
Skip (Club)	W	L	PF	PA	Ends Won	Ends Lost	Blank Ends	Stolen Ends
Jamie Koe (Yellowknife)	6	0	53	18	27	15	1	10
Steve Moss (Yellowknife)	4	2	43	36	23	23	2	7
Jon Solberg (Whitehorse)	2	4	37	53	28	28	0	6
John Yeulet (Whitehorse)	0	6	27	53	17	31	2	3

== Results ==
All times local (Mountain Standard Time)

=== Draw 1 ===
February 10, 7:00pm

Sheet 2	1	2	3	4	5	6	7	8	9	10	11	Final
Jon Solberg	1	0	1	0	1	1	0	2	1	0	1	8
John Yeulet	0	1	0	4	0	0	1	0	0	1	0	7

Sheet 3	1	2	3	4	5	6	7	8	9	10	Final
Jamie Koe	2	0	2	0	3	0	0	0	1	X	8
Steve Moss	0	1	0	1	0	0	3	0	0	X	5

=== Draw 2 ===
February 11, 10:00am

Sheet 6	1	2	3	4	5	6	7	8	9	10	Final
Jon Solberg	1	0	2	0	1	0	2	0	X	X	6
Steve Moss	0	4	0	2	0	2	0	3	X	X	11

Sheet 7	1	2	3	4	5	6	7	8	9	10	Final
Jamie Koe	2	0	2	1	2	0	1	0	X	X	8
John Yeulet	0	0	0	0	0	1	0	0	X	X	1

=== Draw 3 ===
February 11, 2:30pm

Sheet 2	1	2	3	4	5	6	7	8	9	10	Final
Jamie Koe	2	0	2	1	1	3	0	1	X	X	10
Steve Moss	0	2	0	0	0	0	1	0	X	X	3

Sheet 3	1	2	3	4	5	6	7	8	9	10	11	Final
Jon Solberg	0	0	3	1	0	0	0	4	2	0	1	11
John Yeulet	1	1	0	0	2	1	2	0	0	3	0	10

=== Draw 4 ===
February 12, 10:00am

Sheet 4	1	2	3	4	5	6	7	8	9	10	Final
Jamie Koe	2	0	0	2	0	1	2	0	1	X	8
Jon Solberg	0	1	1	0	1	0	0	1	0	X	4

Sheet 5	1	2	3	4	5	6	7	8	9	10	Final
John Yeulet	0	0	0	2	0	1	0	0	X	X	3
Steve Moss	2	1	1	0	2	0	2	1	X	X	9

=== Draw 5 ===
February 12, 2:30pm

Sheet 6	1	2	3	4	5	6	7	8	9	10	Final
John Yeulet	0	0	0	1	0	1	X	X	X	X	2
Jamie Koe	5	1	2	0	1	0	X	X	X	X	9

Sheet 7	1	2	3	4	5	6	7	8	9	10	Final
Steve Moss	2	0	1	1	3	0	0	0	0	0	7
Jon Solberg	0	1	0	0	0	1	1	1	0	1	5

=== Draw 6 ===
February 13, 9:30am

Sheet 4	1	2	3	4	5	6	7	8	9	10	Final
John Yeulet	2	0	2	0	0	0	X	X	X	X	4
Steve Moss	0	1	0	3	3	1	X	X	X	X	8

Sheet 5	1	2	3	4	5	6	7	8	9	10	Final
Jamie Koe	0	5	0	4	1	0	X	X	X	X	10
Jon Solberg	1	0	1	0	0	1	X	X	X	X	3
