= 2010 Canadian Junior Curling Championships =

- Host city: Sorel-Tracy, Quebec
- Arena: Colisée Cardin and Club Curling Aurèle-Racine
- Dates: January 16–24
- Men's winner: Ontario
- Curling club: Westmount G&CC, Kitchener
- Skip: Jake Walker
- Third: Craig Van Ymeren
- Second: Geoff Chambers
- Lead: Matthew Mapletoft
- Coach: John Thompson
- Finalist: Manitoba
- Women's winner: Ontario
- Curling club: Ottawa Curling Club, Ottawa
- Skip: Rachel Homan
- Third: Emma Miskew
- Second: Laura Crocker
- Lead: Lynn Kreviazuk
- Coach: Earle Morris
- Finalist: British Columbia

The 2010 M&M Meat Shops Canadian Junior Curling Championships was held January 16–24 at the Colisée Cardin and at the Club Curling Aurèle-Racine in Sorel-Tracy, Quebec.

== Men's ==
=== Teams ===
| Province / Territory | Skip | Third | Second | Lead |
|---|---|---|---|---|
| Alberta | Brendan Bottcher | Brad Thiessen | Landon Bucholz | Bryce Bucholz |
| British Columbia | Tyler Klymchuk | Michael Horita | Dylan Somerton | Elliott Franklin |
| Manitoba | Alex Forrest | Joseph Witherspoon | Connor Njegovan | Mike Neufeld |
| New Brunswick | Josh Barry | Chris Sleep | Blake Hunter | Alex Kyle |
| Newfoundland and Labrador | Kelly Schuh | Cory Schuh | Scott Eaton | Steve Moss |
| Northern Ontario | Christian Tolusso | Adam Lamers | Mark Adams | Peter Deboer |
| Nova Scotia | Scott Garnett | Travis Stone | Tony Weingartshofer | Paul Weingartshofer |
| Northwest Territories | Colin Miller | Rob Heimbach | John Murray | David Aho |
| Ontario | Jake Walker | Craig Van Ymeren | Geoff Chambers | Matthew Mapletoft |
| Prince Edward Island | Brett Gallant | Adam Casey | Anson Carmody | Alex MacFadyen |
| Quebec | Kevin Rivest | Jeremy La Salle-Pike | Harrison Pollock | Jean-Michel Crête |
| Saskatchewan | Braeden Moskowy | Matt Lang | Trent Knapp | Kelly Knapp |
| Yukon | Thomas Scoffin | Will Mahoney | Nick Koltun | Mitch Young |

=== Standings ===
| Province / Territory | W | L |
|---|---|---|
| Manitoba | 10 | 2 |
| Ontario | 9 | 3 |
| Saskatchewan | 9 | 3 |
| Prince Edward Island | 8 | 4 |
| Nova Scotia | 8 | 4 |
| Alberta | 6 | 6 |
| Newfoundland and Labrador | 6 | 6 |
| British Columbia | 6 | 6 |
| Yukon | 5 | 7 |
| New Brunswick | 5 | 7 |
| Northern Ontario | 4 | 8 |
| Quebec | 1 | 11 |
| Northwest Territories | 1 | 11 |

=== Scores ===
Draw 1

| Sheet B | 1 | 2 | 3 | 4 | 5 | 6 | 7 | 8 | 9 | 10 | Final |
|---|---|---|---|---|---|---|---|---|---|---|---|
| Saskatchewan (Moskowy) | 0 | 0 | 1 | 1 | 1 | 0 | 1 | 0 | 2 | X | 6 |
| Northern Ontario (Tolusso) | 1 | 0 | 0 | 0 | 0 | 1 | 0 | 1 | 0 | X | 3 |

| Sheet C | 1 | 2 | 3 | 4 | 5 | 6 | 7 | 8 | 9 | 10 | Final |
|---|---|---|---|---|---|---|---|---|---|---|---|
| Nova Scotia (Garnett) | 0 | 0 | 1 | 1 | 0 | 1 | 0 | 1 | 0 | 0 | 4 |
| New Brunswick (Barry) | 0 | 2 | 0 | 0 | 2 | 0 | 0 | 0 | 0 | 1 | 5 |

| Sheet H | 1 | 2 | 3 | 4 | 5 | 6 | 7 | 8 | 9 | 10 | Final |
|---|---|---|---|---|---|---|---|---|---|---|---|
| Newfoundland and Labrador (Schuh) | 0 | 0 | 1 | 0 | 1 | 0 | 1 | 1 | 0 | 0 | 4 |
| Prince Edward Island (Gallant) | 2 | 0 | 0 | 1 | 0 | 2 | 0 | 0 | 1 | 2 | 8 |

Draw 2

| Sheet B | 1 | 2 | 3 | 4 | 5 | 6 | 7 | 8 | 9 | 10 | Final |
|---|---|---|---|---|---|---|---|---|---|---|---|
| Yukon (Scoffin) | 0 | 0 | 0 | 0 | 0 | 0 | 2 | 0 | 0 | X | 2 |
| Manitoba (Forrest) | 0 | 0 | 0 | 0 | 0 | 1 | 0 | 2 | 1 | X | 4 |

| Sheet D | 1 | 2 | 3 | 4 | 5 | 6 | 7 | 8 | 9 | 10 | Final |
|---|---|---|---|---|---|---|---|---|---|---|---|
| Quebec (Rivest) | 0 | 0 | 0 | 0 | 2 | 0 | 0 | 2 | 1 | 1 | 6 |
| Northwest Territories (Miller) | 0 | 1 | 0 | 0 | 0 | 1 | 1 | 0 | 0 | 0 | 3 |

| Sheet F | 1 | 2 | 3 | 4 | 5 | 6 | 7 | 8 | 9 | 10 | Final |
|---|---|---|---|---|---|---|---|---|---|---|---|
| Ontario (Walker) | 1 | 0 | 0 | 2 | 1 | 1 | 0 | 0 | 1 | X | 6 |
| Northern Ontario (Tolusso) | 0 | 0 | 1 | 0 | 0 | 0 | 1 | 1 | 0 | X | 3 |

| Sheet G | 1 | 2 | 3 | 4 | 5 | 6 | 7 | 8 | 9 | 10 | Final |
|---|---|---|---|---|---|---|---|---|---|---|---|
| Alberta (Bottcher) | 0 | 0 | 1 | 1 | 2 | 1 | 0 | 1 | 0 | 0 | 6 |
| British Columbia (Klymchuk) | 1 | 0 | 0 | 0 | 0 | 0 | 2 | 0 | 1 | 1 | 5 |

Draw 3

| Sheet B | 1 | 2 | 3 | 4 | 5 | 6 | 7 | 8 | 9 | 10 | Final |
|---|---|---|---|---|---|---|---|---|---|---|---|
| Prince Edward Island (Gallant) | 1 | 0 | 1 | 1 | 0 | 0 | 1 | 0 | 0 | X | 4 |
| New Brunswick (Barry) | 0 | 1 | 0 | 0 | 2 | 1 | 0 | 4 | 2 | X | 10 |

| Sheet C | 1 | 2 | 3 | 4 | 5 | 6 | 7 | 8 | 9 | 10 | Final |
|---|---|---|---|---|---|---|---|---|---|---|---|
| Newfoundland and Labrador (Schuh) | 0 | 1 | 0 | 1 | 0 | 1 | 0 | 1 | 0 | X | 4 |
| Ontario (Walker) | 0 | 0 | 2 | 0 | 2 | 0 | 2 | 0 | 1 | X | 7 |

| Sheet H | 1 | 2 | 3 | 4 | 5 | 6 | 7 | 8 | 9 | 10 | Final |
|---|---|---|---|---|---|---|---|---|---|---|---|
| Nova Scotia (Garnett) | 3 | 0 | 2 | 1 | 0 | 0 | 2 | 0 | 0 | 0 | 8 |
| Saskatchewan (Moskowy) | 0 | 1 | 0 | 0 | 2 | 3 | 0 | 1 | 2 | 2 | 11 |

Draw 4

| Sheet B | 1 | 2 | 3 | 4 | 5 | 6 | 7 | 8 | 9 | 10 | Final |
|---|---|---|---|---|---|---|---|---|---|---|---|
| Alberta (Bottcher) | 0 | 2 | 1 | 0 | 4 | 0 | 2 | 0 | X | X | 9 |
| Quebec (Rivest) | 0 | 0 | 0 | 1 | 0 | 1 | 0 | 0 | X | X | 2 |

| Sheet D | 1 | 2 | 3 | 4 | 5 | 6 | 7 | 8 | 9 | 10 | Final |
|---|---|---|---|---|---|---|---|---|---|---|---|
| Northern Ontario (Tolusso) | 0 | 0 | 1 | 0 | 1 | 0 | 3 | 1 | 0 | 1 | 7 |
| British Columbia (Klymchuk) | 1 | 2 | 0 | 1 | 0 | 2 | 0 | 0 | 2 | 0 | 8 |

| Sheet E | 1 | 2 | 3 | 4 | 5 | 6 | 7 | 8 | 9 | 10 | Final |
|---|---|---|---|---|---|---|---|---|---|---|---|
| Yukon (Scoffin) | 0 | 0 | 0 | 0 | 0 | 2 | 0 | X | X | X | 2 |
| Saskatchewan (Moskowy) | 2 | 2 | 2 | 2 | 1 | 0 | 0 | X | X | X | 9 |

| Sheet H | 1 | 2 | 3 | 4 | 5 | 6 | 7 | 8 | 9 | 10 | Final |
|---|---|---|---|---|---|---|---|---|---|---|---|
| Northwest Territories (Miller) | 0 | 0 | 0 | 0 | 0 | 1 | 0 | 0 | 1 | X | 2 |
| Manitoba (Forrest) | 0 | 0 | 1 | 1 | 1 | 0 | 5 | 0 | 0 | X | 8 |

Draw 5

| Sheet A | 1 | 2 | 3 | 4 | 5 | 6 | 7 | 8 | 9 | 10 | Final |
|---|---|---|---|---|---|---|---|---|---|---|---|
| Newfoundland and Labrador (Schuh) | 0 | 1 | 0 | 0 | 0 | 1 | 1 | 0 | 1 | 1 | 5 |
| Nova Scotia (Garnett) | 1 | 0 | 0 | 1 | 1 | 0 | 0 | 3 | 0 | 0 | 6 |

| Sheet D | 1 | 2 | 3 | 4 | 5 | 6 | 7 | 8 | 9 | 10 | 11 | Final |
|---|---|---|---|---|---|---|---|---|---|---|---|---|
| Prince Edward Island (Gallant) | 0 | 3 | 0 | 0 | 2 | 0 | 0 | 1 | 0 | 1 | 0 | 7 |
| Manitoba (Forrest) | 1 | 0 | 1 | 1 | 0 | 2 | 0 | 0 | 2 | 0 | 1 | 8 |

| Sheet E | 1 | 2 | 3 | 4 | 5 | 6 | 7 | 8 | 9 | 10 | Final |
|---|---|---|---|---|---|---|---|---|---|---|---|
| New Brunswick (Barry) | 0 | 1 | 1 | 1 | 0 | 0 | 2 | 0 | 1 | X | 6 |
| Quebec (Rivest) | 2 | 0 | 0 | 0 | 0 | 1 | 0 | 0 | 0 | X | 3 |

| Sheet H | 1 | 2 | 3 | 4 | 5 | 6 | 7 | 8 | 9 | 10 | Final |
|---|---|---|---|---|---|---|---|---|---|---|---|
| Ontario (Walker) | 0 | 1 | 1 | 1 | 0 | 1 | 2 | 0 | 0 | X | 6 |
| Yukon (Scoffin) | 0 | 0 | 0 | 0 | 1 | 0 | 0 | 0 | 1 | X | 2 |

Draw 6

| Sheet A | 1 | 2 | 3 | 4 | 5 | 6 | 7 | 8 | 9 | 10 | Final |
|---|---|---|---|---|---|---|---|---|---|---|---|
| Saskatchewan (Moskowy) | 2 | 0 | 0 | 0 | 0 | 1 | 1 | 3 | 1 | X | 8 |
| Northwest Territories (Miller) | 0 | 2 | 1 | 2 | 1 | 0 | 0 | 0 | 0 | X | 6 |

| Sheet D | 1 | 2 | 3 | 4 | 5 | 6 | 7 | 8 | 9 | 10 | 11 | Final |
|---|---|---|---|---|---|---|---|---|---|---|---|---|
| Nova Scotia (Garnett) | 0 | 0 | 2 | 1 | 0 | 1 | 1 | 0 | 0 | 2 | 1 | 8 |
| Alberta (Bottcher) | 2 | 1 | 0 | 0 | 1 | 0 | 0 | 2 | 1 | 0 | 0 | 7 |

| Sheet E | 1 | 2 | 3 | 4 | 5 | 6 | 7 | 8 | 9 | 10 | Final |
|---|---|---|---|---|---|---|---|---|---|---|---|
| British Columbia (Klymchuk) | 0 | 1 | 0 | 1 | 0 | 1 | 1 | 0 | 0 | X | 4 |
| Prince Edward Island (Gallant) | 1 | 0 | 2 | 0 | 3 | 0 | 0 | 1 | 0 | X | 7 |

| Sheet H | 1 | 2 | 3 | 4 | 5 | 6 | 7 | 8 | 9 | 10 | Final |
|---|---|---|---|---|---|---|---|---|---|---|---|
| New Brunswick (Barry) | 1 | 0 | 1 | 0 | 1 | 0 | 2 | 0 | 1 | X | 6 |
| Northern Ontario (Tolusso) | 0 | 3 | 0 | 2 | 0 | 2 | 0 | 2 | 0 | X | 9 |

Draw 7

| Sheet A | 1 | 2 | 3 | 4 | 5 | 6 | 7 | 8 | 9 | 10 | 11 | Final |
|---|---|---|---|---|---|---|---|---|---|---|---|---|
| Ontario (Walker) | 1 | 0 | 1 | 0 | 1 | 0 | 0 | 0 | 0 | 1 | 0 | 4 |
| Manitoba (Forrest) | 0 | 1 | 0 | 1 | 0 | 1 | 0 | 1 | 0 | 0 | 1 | 5 |

| Sheet C | 1 | 2 | 3 | 4 | 5 | 6 | 7 | 8 | 9 | 10 | Final |
|---|---|---|---|---|---|---|---|---|---|---|---|
| Northwest Territories (Miller) | 0 | 1 | 1 | 1 | 0 | 1 | 0 | 2 | 0 | 0 | 6 |
| Yukon (Scoffin) | 2 | 0 | 0 | 0 | 2 | 0 | 1 | 0 | 0 | 2 | 7 |

| Sheet F | 1 | 2 | 3 | 4 | 5 | 6 | 7 | 8 | 9 | 10 | Final |
|---|---|---|---|---|---|---|---|---|---|---|---|
| Newfoundland and Labrador (Schuh) | 0 | 0 | 0 | 2 | 0 | 1 | 0 | 1 | 1 | 0 | 5 |
| Alberta (Bottcher) | 0 | 2 | 0 | 0 | 1 | 0 | 1 | 0 | 0 | 2 | 6 |

| Sheet H | 1 | 2 | 3 | 4 | 5 | 6 | 7 | 8 | 9 | 10 | Final |
|---|---|---|---|---|---|---|---|---|---|---|---|
| Quebec (Rivest) | 0 | 0 | 2 | 0 | 2 | 0 | 2 | 0 | 2 | 0 | 8 |
| British Columbia (Klymchuk) | 0 | 1 | 0 | 5 | 0 | 1 | 0 | 1 | 0 | 1 | 9 |

Draw 8

| Sheet A | 1 | 2 | 3 | 4 | 5 | 6 | 7 | 8 | 9 | 10 | Final |
|---|---|---|---|---|---|---|---|---|---|---|---|
| Alberta (Bottcher) | 0 | 1 | 0 | 1 | 3 | 0 | 1 | 4 | 0 | X | 10 |
| New Brunswick (Barry) | 0 | 0 | 1 | 0 | 0 | 2 | 0 | 0 | 0 | X | 3 |

| Sheet C | 1 | 2 | 3 | 4 | 5 | 6 | 7 | 8 | 9 | 10 | 11 | Final |
|---|---|---|---|---|---|---|---|---|---|---|---|---|
| British Columbia (Klymchuk) | 1 | 0 | 0 | 1 | 0 | 0 | 1 | 0 | 2 | 1 | 1 | 7 |
| Saskatchewan (Moskowy) | 0 | 0 | 2 | 0 | 1 | 1 | 0 | 2 | 0 | 0 | 0 | 6 |

| Sheet E | 1 | 2 | 3 | 4 | 5 | 6 | 7 | 8 | 9 | 10 | Final |
|---|---|---|---|---|---|---|---|---|---|---|---|
| Northern Ontario (Tolusso) | 1 | 0 | 1 | 0 | 2 | 3 | 2 | 0 | 0 | X | 9 |
| Northwest Territories (Miller) | 0 | 1 | 0 | 1 | 0 | 0 | 0 | 1 | 1 | X | 4 |

| Sheet G | 1 | 2 | 3 | 4 | 5 | 6 | 7 | 8 | 9 | 10 | 11 | Final |
|---|---|---|---|---|---|---|---|---|---|---|---|---|
| Prince Edward Island (Gallant) | 0 | 1 | 0 | 1 | 0 | 2 | 1 | 1 | 0 | 1 | 2 | 9 |
| Nova Scotia (Garnett) | 2 | 0 | 1 | 0 | 2 | 0 | 0 | 0 | 2 | 0 | 0 | 7 |

Draw 9

| Sheet A | 1 | 2 | 3 | 4 | 5 | 6 | 7 | 8 | 9 | 10 | Final |
|---|---|---|---|---|---|---|---|---|---|---|---|
| Quebec (Rivest) | 0 | 0 | 0 | 0 | 1 | 1 | 0 | 2 | 0 | X | 4 |
| Prince Edward Island (Gallant) | 2 | 1 | 1 | 1 | 0 | 0 | 1 | 0 | 1 | X | 7 |

| Sheet D | 1 | 2 | 3 | 4 | 5 | 6 | 7 | 8 | 9 | 10 | Final |
|---|---|---|---|---|---|---|---|---|---|---|---|
| Ontario (Walker) | 0 | 0 | 4 | 1 | 0 | 0 | 2 | 0 | 1 | X | 8 |
| New Brunswick (Barry) | 2 | 0 | 0 | 0 | 1 | 1 | 0 | 2 | 0 | X | 6 |

| Sheet F | 1 | 2 | 3 | 4 | 5 | 6 | 7 | 8 | 9 | 10 | Final |
|---|---|---|---|---|---|---|---|---|---|---|---|
| Yukon (Scoffin) | 0 | 0 | 1 | 0 | 0 | 2 | 0 | 0 | X | X | 3 |
| Nova Scotia (Garnett) | 2 | 0 | 0 | 3 | 4 | 0 | 4 | 0 | X | X | 13 |

| Sheet G | 1 | 2 | 3 | 4 | 5 | 6 | 7 | 8 | 9 | 10 | Final |
|---|---|---|---|---|---|---|---|---|---|---|---|
| Manitoba (Forrest) | 0 | 0 | 2 | 1 | 1 | 0 | 0 | 3 | 0 | 2 | 9 |
| Newfoundland and Labrador (Schuh) | 0 | 1 | 0 | 0 | 0 | 2 | 2 | 0 | 1 | 0 | 6 |

Draw 10

| Sheet B | 1 | 2 | 3 | 4 | 5 | 6 | 7 | 8 | 9 | 10 | Final |
|---|---|---|---|---|---|---|---|---|---|---|---|
| Nova Scotia (Garnett) | 1 | 2 | 0 | 2 | 0 | 2 | 1 | 1 | X | X | 9 |
| Northwest Territories (Miller) | 0 | 0 | 2 | 0 | 1 | 0 | 0 | 0 | X | X | 3 |

| Sheet C | 1 | 2 | 3 | 4 | 5 | 6 | 7 | 8 | 9 | 10 | Final |
|---|---|---|---|---|---|---|---|---|---|---|---|
| Prince Edward Island (Gallant) | 1 | 0 | 3 | 0 | 0 | 1 | 2 | 0 | 2 | X | 9 |
| Northern Ontario (Tolusso) | 0 | 3 | 0 | 1 | 1 | 0 | 0 | 1 | 0 | X | 6 |

| Sheet F | 1 | 2 | 3 | 4 | 5 | 6 | 7 | 8 | 9 | 10 | Final |
|---|---|---|---|---|---|---|---|---|---|---|---|
| British Columbia (Klymchuk) | 0 | 0 | 3 | 1 | 3 | 5 | 0 | X | X | X | 12 |
| New Brunswick (Barry) | 0 | 3 | 0 | 0 | 0 | 0 | 0 | X | X | X | 3 |

| Sheet G | 1 | 2 | 3 | 4 | 5 | 6 | 7 | 8 | 9 | 10 | Final |
|---|---|---|---|---|---|---|---|---|---|---|---|
| Saskatchewan (Moskowy) | 1 | 0 | 1 | 0 | 0 | 3 | 0 | 0 | 0 | 2 | 7 |
| Alberta (Bottcher) | 0 | 2 | 0 | 0 | 2 | 0 | 1 | 1 | 0 | 0 | 6 |

Draw 11

| Sheet A | 1 | 2 | 3 | 4 | 5 | 6 | 7 | 8 | 9 | 10 | Final |
|---|---|---|---|---|---|---|---|---|---|---|---|
| British Columbia (Klymchuk) | 0 | 1 | 1 | 0 | 0 | 0 | 1 | 0 | 1 | X | 4 |
| Yukon (Scoffin) | 0 | 0 | 0 | 2 | 2 | 0 | 0 | 3 | 0 | X | 7 |

| Sheet C | 1 | 2 | 3 | 4 | 5 | 6 | 7 | 8 | 9 | 10 | Final |
|---|---|---|---|---|---|---|---|---|---|---|---|
| Quebec (Rivest) | 0 | 0 | 1 | 3 | 0 | 0 | 1 | 0 | X | X | 5 |
| Newfoundland and Labrador (Schuh) | 1 | 1 | 0 | 0 | 4 | 3 | 0 | 1 | X | X | 10 |

| Sheet E | 1 | 2 | 3 | 4 | 5 | 6 | 7 | 8 | 9 | 10 | Final |
|---|---|---|---|---|---|---|---|---|---|---|---|
| Alberta (Bottcher) | 2 | 1 | 0 | 1 | 0 | 2 | 0 | 0 | 0 | 0 | 6 |
| Manitoba (Forrest) | 0 | 0 | 2 | 0 | 2 | 0 | 0 | 2 | 0 | 1 | 7 |

| Sheet G | 1 | 2 | 3 | 4 | 5 | 6 | 7 | 8 | 9 | 10 | Final |
|---|---|---|---|---|---|---|---|---|---|---|---|
| Ontario (Walker) | 1 | 3 | 1 | 1 | 1 | 0 | X | X | X | X | 7 |
| Northwest Territories (Miller) | 0 | 0 | 0 | 0 | 0 | 1 | X | X | X | X | 1 |

Draw 12

| Sheet B | 1 | 2 | 3 | 4 | 5 | 6 | 7 | 8 | 9 | 10 | 11 | Final |
|---|---|---|---|---|---|---|---|---|---|---|---|---|
| New Brunswick (Barry) | 0 | 1 | 0 | 0 | 4 | 0 | 1 | 0 | 0 | 2 | 0 | 8 |
| Newfoundland and Labrador (Schuh) | 1 | 0 | 1 | 1 | 0 | 2 | 0 | 1 | 2 | 0 | 1 | 9 |

| Sheet C | 1 | 2 | 3 | 4 | 5 | 6 | 7 | 8 | 9 | 10 | Final |
|---|---|---|---|---|---|---|---|---|---|---|---|
| Manitoba (Forrest) | 1 | 0 | 0 | 2 | 1 | 0 | 3 | 0 | 2 | X | 9 |
| Nova Scotia (Garnett) | 0 | 0 | 2 | 0 | 0 | 1 | 0 | 2 | 0 | X | 5 |

| Sheet F | 1 | 2 | 3 | 4 | 5 | 6 | 7 | 8 | 9 | 10 | Final |
|---|---|---|---|---|---|---|---|---|---|---|---|
| Prince Edward Island (Gallant) | 0 | 0 | 1 | 0 | 0 | 1 | 0 | 1 | 0 | X | 3 |
| Saskatchewan (Moskowy) | 0 | 2 | 0 | 2 | 1 | 0 | 1 | 0 | 2 | X | 8 |

| Sheet G | 1 | 2 | 3 | 4 | 5 | 6 | 7 | 8 | 9 | 10 | Final |
|---|---|---|---|---|---|---|---|---|---|---|---|
| Quebec (Rivest) | 1 | 0 | 1 | 0 | 0 | 0 | 2 | 0 | 1 | 0 | 5 |
| Northern Ontario (Tolusso) | 0 | 1 | 0 | 0 | 2 | 1 | 0 | 1 | 0 | 1 | 6 |

Draw 13

| Sheet B | 1 | 2 | 3 | 4 | 5 | 6 | 7 | 8 | 9 | 10 | Final |
|---|---|---|---|---|---|---|---|---|---|---|---|
| Quebec (Rivest) | 0 | 0 | 1 | 1 | 0 | 1 | 0 | 1 | 0 | X | 4 |
| Ontario (Walker) | 0 | 1 | 0 | 0 | 2 | 0 | 5 | 0 | 1 | X | 9 |

| Sheet C | 1 | 2 | 3 | 4 | 5 | 6 | 7 | 8 | 9 | 10 | 11 | Final |
|---|---|---|---|---|---|---|---|---|---|---|---|---|
| Yukon (Scoffin) | 2 | 0 | 2 | 1 | 0 | 1 | 0 | 2 | 0 | 0 | 0 | 8 |
| Prince Edward Island (Gallant) | 0 | 2 | 0 | 0 | 1 | 0 | 1 | 0 | 2 | 2 | 4 | 12 |

| Sheet F | 1 | 2 | 3 | 4 | 5 | 6 | 7 | 8 | 9 | 10 | Final |
|---|---|---|---|---|---|---|---|---|---|---|---|
| Northern Ontario (Tolusso) | 0 | 2 | 0 | 2 | 0 | 1 | 2 | 2 | X | X | 9 |
| Manitoba (Forrest) | 1 | 0 | 2 | 0 | 1 | 0 | 0 | 0 | X | X | 4 |

| Sheet G | 1 | 2 | 3 | 4 | 5 | 6 | 7 | 8 | 9 | 10 | Final |
|---|---|---|---|---|---|---|---|---|---|---|---|
| Newfoundland and Labrador (Schuh) | 0 | 2 | 0 | 0 | 2 | 0 | 0 | 0 | X | X | 4 |
| Saskatchewan (Moskowy) | 0 | 0 | 3 | 3 | 0 | 0 | 0 | 4 | X | X | 10 |

Draw 14

| Sheet A | 1 | 2 | 3 | 4 | 5 | 6 | 7 | 8 | 9 | 10 | 11 | Final |
|---|---|---|---|---|---|---|---|---|---|---|---|---|
| New Brunswick (Barry) | 0 | 0 | 0 | 2 | 0 | 0 | 3 | 1 | 0 | 0 | 1 | 7 |
| Saskatchewan (Moskowy) | 0 | 0 | 2 | 0 | 1 | 0 | 0 | 0 | 2 | 1 | 0 | 6 |

| Sheet D | 1 | 2 | 3 | 4 | 5 | 6 | 7 | 8 | 9 | 10 | Final |
|---|---|---|---|---|---|---|---|---|---|---|---|
| Alberta (Bottcher) | 0 | 3 | 0 | 1 | 0 | 2 | 0 | 0 | 0 | 0 | 6 |
| Prince Edward Island (Gallant) | 2 | 0 | 1 | 0 | 2 | 0 | 2 | 0 | 0 | 1 | 8 |

| Sheet E | 1 | 2 | 3 | 4 | 5 | 6 | 7 | 8 | 9 | 10 | Final |
|---|---|---|---|---|---|---|---|---|---|---|---|
| Northwest Territories (Miller) | 1 | 0 | 1 | 1 | 0 | 0 | 1 | 0 | 0 | X | 4 |
| British Columbia (Klymchuk) | 0 | 1 | 0 | 0 | 2 | 1 | 0 | 1 | 1 | X | 6 |

| Sheet H | 1 | 2 | 3 | 4 | 5 | 6 | 7 | 8 | 9 | 10 | Final |
|---|---|---|---|---|---|---|---|---|---|---|---|
| Northern Ontario (Tolusso) | 0 | 0 | 1 | 0 | 0 | 1 | 0 | X | X | X | 2 |
| Nova Scotia (Garnett) | 1 | 1 | 0 | 4 | 1 | 0 | 2 | X | X | X | 9 |

Draw 15

| Sheet A | 1 | 2 | 3 | 4 | 5 | 6 | 7 | 8 | 9 | 10 | Final |
|---|---|---|---|---|---|---|---|---|---|---|---|
| Northwest Territories (Miller) | 0 | 0 | 1 | 1 | 0 | 1 | 1 | 3 | X | X | 7 |
| Alberta (Bottcher) | 0 | 1 | 0 | 0 | 0 | 0 | 0 | 0 | X | X | 1 |

| Sheet C | 1 | 2 | 3 | 4 | 5 | 6 | 7 | 8 | 9 | 10 | 11 | Final |
|---|---|---|---|---|---|---|---|---|---|---|---|---|
| Ontario (Walker) | 0 | 2 | 0 | 0 | 0 | 0 | 3 | 0 | 1 | 0 | 0 | 6 |
| British Columbia (Klymchuk) | 1 | 0 | 0 | 1 | 0 | 1 | 0 | 1 | 0 | 2 | 2 | 8 |

| Sheet E | 1 | 2 | 3 | 4 | 5 | 6 | 7 | 8 | 9 | 10 | Final |
|---|---|---|---|---|---|---|---|---|---|---|---|
| Newfoundland and Labrador (Schuh) | 1 | 1 | 1 | 0 | 0 | 0 | 0 | 2 | 0 | X | 5 |
| Yukon (Scoffin) | 0 | 0 | 0 | 1 | 0 | 0 | 0 | 0 | 1 | X | 2 |

| Sheet H | 1 | 2 | 3 | 4 | 5 | 6 | 7 | 8 | 9 | 10 | Final |
|---|---|---|---|---|---|---|---|---|---|---|---|
| Manitoba (Forrest) | 0 | 0 | 2 | 3 | 3 | 0 | X | X | X | X | 8 |
| Quebec (Rivest) | 0 | 1 | 0 | 0 | 0 | 0 | X | X | X | X | 1 |

Draw 16

| Sheet A | 1 | 2 | 3 | 4 | 5 | 6 | 7 | 8 | 9 | 10 | Final |
|---|---|---|---|---|---|---|---|---|---|---|---|
| Manitoba (Forrest) | 0 | 2 | 1 | 0 | 0 | 1 | 0 | 0 | 0 | 4 | 8 |
| British Columbia (Klymchuk) | 0 | 0 | 0 | 0 | 1 | 0 | 1 | 2 | 1 | 0 | 5 |

| Sheet C | 1 | 2 | 3 | 4 | 5 | 6 | 7 | 8 | 9 | 10 | Final |
|---|---|---|---|---|---|---|---|---|---|---|---|
| New Brunswick (Barry) | 0 | 0 | 1 | 0 | 1 | 1 | 0 | 0 | 1 | 1 | 5 |
| Northwest Territories (Miller) | 0 | 0 | 0 | 2 | 0 | 0 | 1 | 1 | 0 | 0 | 4 |

| Sheet F | 1 | 2 | 3 | 4 | 5 | 6 | 7 | 8 | 9 | 10 | Final |
|---|---|---|---|---|---|---|---|---|---|---|---|
| Nova Scotia (Garnett) | 2 | 0 | 1 | 0 | 0 | 1 | 0 | 2 | 0 | 1 | 7 |
| Quebec (Rivest) | 0 | 0 | 0 | 0 | 1 | 0 | 1 | 0 | 1 | 0 | 3 |

| Sheet H | 1 | 2 | 3 | 4 | 5 | 6 | 7 | 8 | 9 | 10 | Final |
|---|---|---|---|---|---|---|---|---|---|---|---|
| Yukon (Scoffin) | 0 | 2 | 0 | 0 | 0 | 1 | 0 | X | X | X | 3 |
| Alberta (Bottcher) | 2 | 0 | 1 | 0 | 6 | 0 | 3 | X | X | X | 12 |

Draw 17

| Sheet B | 1 | 2 | 3 | 4 | 5 | 6 | 7 | 8 | 9 | 10 | Final |
|---|---|---|---|---|---|---|---|---|---|---|---|
| Northwest Territories (Miller) | 1 | 0 | 2 | 0 | 0 | 0 | 1 | X | X | X | 4 |
| Prince Edward Island (Gallant) | 0 | 5 | 0 | 2 | 1 | 3 | 0 | X | X | X | 11 |

| Sheet C | 1 | 2 | 3 | 4 | 5 | 6 | 7 | 8 | 9 | 10 | Final |
|---|---|---|---|---|---|---|---|---|---|---|---|
| Northern Ontario (Tolusso) | 0 | 1 | 0 | 1 | 1 | 0 | 2 | 1 | 0 | 0 | 6 |
| Alberta (Bottcher) | 1 | 0 | 2 | 0 | 0 | 3 | 0 | 0 | 2 | 2 | 10 |

| Sheet E | 1 | 2 | 3 | 4 | 5 | 6 | 7 | 8 | 9 | 10 | Final |
|---|---|---|---|---|---|---|---|---|---|---|---|
| Saskatchewan (Moskowy) | 1 | 0 | 0 | 1 | 0 | 0 | 2 | 0 | 0 | 1 | 5 |
| Ontario (Walker) | 0 | 2 | 1 | 0 | 1 | 1 | 0 | 1 | 1 | 0 | 7 |

| Sheet H | 1 | 2 | 3 | 4 | 5 | 6 | 7 | 8 | 9 | 10 | Final |
|---|---|---|---|---|---|---|---|---|---|---|---|
| British Columbia (Klymchuk) | 0 | 0 | 0 | 2 | 1 | 0 | 0 | 1 | 1 | 0 | 5 |
| Newfoundland and Labrador (Schuh) | 3 | 0 | 0 | 0 | 0 | 1 | 1 | 0 | 0 | 1 | 6 |

Draw 18

| Sheet B | 1 | 2 | 3 | 4 | 5 | 6 | 7 | 8 | 9 | 10 | Final |
|---|---|---|---|---|---|---|---|---|---|---|---|
| Northern Ontario (Tolusso) | 0 | 1 | 0 | 0 | 1 | 0 | 1 | 1 | 0 | 0 | 4 |
| Yukon (Scoffin) | 1 | 0 | 1 | 1 | 0 | 1 | 0 | 0 | 1 | 2 | 7 |

| Sheet C | 1 | 2 | 3 | 4 | 5 | 6 | 7 | 8 | 9 | 10 | Final |
|---|---|---|---|---|---|---|---|---|---|---|---|
| Saskatchewan (Moskowy) | 1 | 1 | 0 | 0 | 1 | 2 | 2 | 0 | 1 | X | 8 |
| Quebec (Rivest) | 0 | 0 | 2 | 1 | 0 | 0 | 0 | 1 | 0 | X | 4 |

| Sheet E | 1 | 2 | 3 | 4 | 5 | 6 | 7 | 8 | 9 | 10 | Final |
|---|---|---|---|---|---|---|---|---|---|---|---|
| Manitoba (Forrest) | 1 | 0 | 0 | 2 | 0 | 1 | 0 | 1 | 0 | 1 | 6 |
| New Brunswick (Barry) | 0 | 0 | 2 | 0 | 1 | 0 | 1 | 0 | 1 | 0 | 5 |

| Sheet G | 1 | 2 | 3 | 4 | 5 | 6 | 7 | 8 | 9 | 10 | Final |
|---|---|---|---|---|---|---|---|---|---|---|---|
| Nova Scotia (Garnett) | 0 | 0 | 1 | 0 | 1 | 1 | 1 | 1 | 3 | X | 8 |
| Ontario (Walker) | 0 | 0 | 0 | 2 | 0 | 0 | 0 | 0 | 0 | X | 2 |

Draw 19

| Sheet A | 1 | 2 | 3 | 4 | 5 | 6 | 7 | 8 | 9 | 10 | Final |
|---|---|---|---|---|---|---|---|---|---|---|---|
| Northern Ontario (Tolusso) | 0 | 1 | 0 | 0 | 1 | 0 | 1 | 0 | 0 | X | 3 |
| Newfoundland and Labrador (Schuh) | 0 | 0 | 0 | 1 | 0 | 1 | 0 | 1 | 3 | X | 6 |

| Sheet D | 1 | 2 | 3 | 4 | 5 | 6 | 7 | 8 | 9 | 10 | Final |
|---|---|---|---|---|---|---|---|---|---|---|---|
| Manitoba (Forrest) | 1 | 0 | 1 | 0 | 0 | 1 | 0 | 1 | 0 | X | 4 |
| Saskatchewan (Moskowy) | 0 | 2 | 0 | 2 | 1 | 0 | 1 | 0 | 1 | X | 7 |

| Sheet F | 1 | 2 | 3 | 4 | 5 | 6 | 7 | 8 | 9 | 10 | Final |
|---|---|---|---|---|---|---|---|---|---|---|---|
| Alberta (Bottcher) | 1 | 0 | 0 | 0 | 0 | 0 | 1 | X | X | X | 2 |
| Ontario (Walker) | 0 | 0 | 2 | 1 | 2 | 2 | 0 | X | X | X | 7 |

| Sheet G | 1 | 2 | 3 | 4 | 5 | 6 | 7 | 8 | 9 | 10 | Final |
|---|---|---|---|---|---|---|---|---|---|---|---|
| New Brunswick (Barry) | 0 | 0 | 1 | 0 | 1 | 0 | 0 | 2 | 2 | 0 | 6 |
| Yukon (Scoffin) | 1 | 0 | 0 | 3 | 0 | 1 | 1 | 0 | 0 | 3 | 9 |

Draw 20

| Sheet B | 1 | 2 | 3 | 4 | 5 | 6 | 7 | 8 | 9 | 10 | Final |
|---|---|---|---|---|---|---|---|---|---|---|---|
| British Columbia (Klymchuk) | 0 | 0 | 0 | 1 | 1 | 0 | 1 | 0 | 1 | X | 4 |
| Nova Scotia (Garnett) | 0 | 0 | 2 | 0 | 0 | 3 | 0 | 1 | 0 | X | 6 |

| Sheet D | 1 | 2 | 3 | 4 | 5 | 6 | 7 | 8 | 9 | 10 | Final |
|---|---|---|---|---|---|---|---|---|---|---|---|
| Yukon (Scoffin) | 0 | 0 | 3 | 0 | 2 | 0 | 0 | 0 | 1 | X | 6 |
| Quebec (Rivest) | 1 | 1 | 0 | 1 | 0 | 0 | 0 | 1 | 0 | X | 4 |

| Sheet F | 1 | 2 | 3 | 4 | 5 | 6 | 7 | 8 | 9 | 10 | Final |
|---|---|---|---|---|---|---|---|---|---|---|---|
| Northwest Territories (Miller) | 1 | 1 | 0 | 0 | 0 | 0 | 0 | 3 | 0 | 0 | 5 |
| Newfoundland and Labrador (Schuh) | 0 | 0 | 0 | 0 | 1 | 4 | 0 | 0 | 0 | 1 | 6 |

| Sheet H | 1 | 2 | 3 | 4 | 5 | 6 | 7 | 8 | 9 | 10 | Final |
|---|---|---|---|---|---|---|---|---|---|---|---|
| Prince Edward Island (Gallant) | 1 | 0 | 0 | 0 | 0 | 0 | 1 | 1 | 0 | X | 3 |
| Ontario (Walker) | 0 | 1 | 1 | 1 | 3 | 1 | 0 | 0 | 1 | X | 8 |

== Playoffs ==
| Semifinal | | Final |
| Ontario | 8 |
| Saskatchewan | 5 | Manitoba | 7 |
| | | Ontario | 8 |

=== Semifinal ===
| Sheet B | 1 | 2 | 3 | 4 | 5 | 6 | 7 | 8 | 9 | 10 | Final |
|---|---|---|---|---|---|---|---|---|---|---|---|
| Ontario (Walker) | 0 | 0 | 0 | 3 | 1 | 1 | 0 | 3 | 0 | X | 8 |
| Saskatchewan (Moskowy) | 0 | 0 | 1 | 0 | 0 | 0 | 3 | 0 | 1 | X | 5 |

Player percentages
| Ontario | | Saskatchewan | |
|---|---|---|---|
| Matthew Mapletoft | 69% | Kelly Knapp | 84% |
| Geoff Chambers | 68% | Trent Knapp | 83% |
| Craig Van Ymeren | 69% | Matt Lang | 76% |
| Jake Walker | 71% | Braeden Moskowy | 67% |
| Total | 69% | Total | 78% |

=== Final ===
| Sheet C | 1 | 2 | 3 | 4 | 5 | 6 | 7 | 8 | 9 | 10 | Final |
|---|---|---|---|---|---|---|---|---|---|---|---|
| Ontario (Walker) | 1 | 0 | 1 | 0 | 2 | 1 | 0 | 1 | 0 | 2 | 8 |
| Manitoba (Forrest) | 0 | 1 | 0 | 3 | 0 | 0 | 1 | 0 | 2 | 0 | 7 |

Player percentages
| Ontario | | Manitoba | |
|---|---|---|---|
| Matthew Mapletoft | 83% | Mike Neufeld | 89% |
| Geoff Chambers | 61% | Connor Njegovan | 64% |
| Craig Van Ymeren | 60% | Joseph Witherspoon | 75% |
| Jake Walker | 86% | Alex Forrest | 61% |
| Total | 73% | Total | 72% |

== Women's ==
=== Teams ===
| Province / Territory | Skip | Third | Second | Lead | Club(s) |
|---|---|---|---|---|---|
| Alberta | Nadine Chyz | Rebecca Pattison | Kristina Hadden | Kimberley Anderson | Calgary Curling Club |
| British Columbia | Dailene Sivertson | Simone Brosseau | Jessie Sanderson | Brandi Tinkler | Victoria Curling Club |
| Manitoba | Breanne Meakin | Briane Meilleur | Mariah Mondor | Krysten Karwacki | St. Vital Curling Club |
| New Brunswick | Jessica Daigle | Natalie Menzies | Krista Flanagan | Jade Carruthers | Thistle St. Andrews Curling Club |
| Newfoundland and Labrador | Jen Cunningham | Tara O'Brien | Jessica Cunningham | Cheryl Norman | Remax Centre |
| Northern Ontario | Kendra Lilly | Kim Curtin | Jennifer Gates | Kaitlynd Burns | Idylwylde Golf & Curling Club |
| Nova Scotia | Tara LeGay | Jane Snyder | Leah Squarey | Laura Murray | Bridgewater Curling Club |
| Northwest Territories | Amanda Moizis | Kelsey Hiebert | Olivia Gibbons | Kyla Milne | Hay River Curling Club |
| Ontario | Rachel Homan | Emma Miskew | Laura Crocker | Lynn Kreviazuk | Ottawa Curling Club |
| Prince Edward Island | Sarah Fullerton | Michelle McQuaid | Sara MacRae | Whitney Young | Cornwall Curling Club |
| Quebec | Camille-Marie Lapierre | Alanna Routledge | Melanie Maclean | Kelly-Ann Gazdewich | Otterburn / Glenmore / Hudson Legion |
| Saskatchewan | Trish Paulsen | Melissa Hoffman | Sarah Collin | Kari Paulsen | Nutana Curling Club |
| Yukon | Sarah Koltun | Chelsea Duncan | Linea Eby | Jenna Duncan | Whitehorse Curling Club |

=== Standings ===
| Province / Territory | W | L |
|---|---|---|
| Ontario | 12 | 0 |
| Northern Ontario | 9 | 3 |
| British Columbia | 8 | 4 |
| Saskatchewan | 8 | 4 |
| Alberta | 8 | 4 |
| Manitoba | 6 | 6 |
| Prince Edward Island | 6 | 6 |
| Newfoundland and Labrador | 5 | 7 |
| New Brunswick | 5 | 7 |
| Quebec | 4 | 8 |
| Nova Scotia | 4 | 8 |
| Yukon | 3 | 9 |
| Northwest Territories | 0 | 12 |

=== Scores ===
Draw 1

| Sheet A | 1 | 2 | 3 | 4 | 5 | 6 | 7 | 8 | 9 | 10 | Final |
|---|---|---|---|---|---|---|---|---|---|---|---|
| Saskatchewan (Paulsen) | 0 | 0 | 0 | 1 | 0 | 2 | 0 | 0 | 0 | 0 | 3 |
| Northern Ontario (Lilly) | 0 | 0 | 1 | 0 | 1 | 0 | 1 | 1 | 0 | 2 | 6 |

| Sheet D | 1 | 2 | 3 | 4 | 5 | 6 | 7 | 8 | 9 | 10 | Final |
|---|---|---|---|---|---|---|---|---|---|---|---|
| Nova Scotia (LeGay) | 1 | 2 | 0 | 0 | 0 | 0 | 0 | 3 | 1 | 1 | 8 |
| New Brunswick (Daigle) | 0 | 0 | 1 | 3 | 1 | 1 | 0 | 0 | 0 | 0 | 6 |

| Sheet G | 1 | 2 | 3 | 4 | 5 | 6 | 7 | 8 | 9 | 10 | Final |
|---|---|---|---|---|---|---|---|---|---|---|---|
| Newfoundland and Labrador (Cunningham) | 0 | 0 | 1 | 0 | 0 | 2 | 1 | 0 | 0 | 0 | 4 |
| Prince Edward Island (Fullerton) | 0 | 1 | 0 | 0 | 3 | 0 | 0 | 1 | 0 | 2 | 7 |

Draw 2

| Sheet A | 1 | 2 | 3 | 4 | 5 | 6 | 7 | 8 | 9 | 10 | Final |
|---|---|---|---|---|---|---|---|---|---|---|---|
| Yukon (Koltun) | 1 | 0 | 0 | 0 | 0 | 0 | 2 | 0 | 0 | X | 3 |
| Manitoba (Meakin) | 0 | 0 | 3 | 1 | 2 | 2 | 0 | 3 | 0 | X | 11 |

| Sheet C | 1 | 2 | 3 | 4 | 5 | 6 | 7 | 8 | 9 | 10 | Final |
|---|---|---|---|---|---|---|---|---|---|---|---|
| Quebec (Lapierre) | 1 | 2 | 5 | 4 | 1 | 2 | 0 | X | X | X | 15 |
| Northwest Territories (Moizis) | 0 | 0 | 0 | 0 | 0 | 0 | 0 | X | X | X | 0 |

| Sheet E | 1 | 2 | 3 | 4 | 5 | 6 | 7 | 8 | 9 | 10 | Final |
|---|---|---|---|---|---|---|---|---|---|---|---|
| Ontario (Homan) | 0 | 2 | 2 | 0 | 0 | 2 | 0 | 3 | 0 | X | 9 |
| Northern Ontario (Lilly) | 0 | 0 | 0 | 1 | 1 | 0 | 2 | 0 | 0 | X | 4 |

| Sheet H | 1 | 2 | 3 | 4 | 5 | 6 | 7 | 8 | 9 | 10 | 11 | Final |
|---|---|---|---|---|---|---|---|---|---|---|---|---|
| Alberta (Chyz) | 1 | 0 | 2 | 0 | 0 | 3 | 0 | 3 | 0 | 0 | 0 | 9 |
| British Columbia (Sivertson) | 0 | 1 | 0 | 3 | 2 | 0 | 2 | 0 | 0 | 1 | 1 | 10 |

Draw 3

| Sheet A | 1 | 2 | 3 | 4 | 5 | 6 | 7 | 8 | 9 | 10 | Final |
|---|---|---|---|---|---|---|---|---|---|---|---|
| Prince Edward Island (Fullerton) | 1 | 0 | 0 | 2 | 0 | 0 | 0 | 2 | 0 | X | 5 |
| New Brunswick (Daigle) | 0 | 4 | 1 | 0 | 1 | 2 | 1 | 0 | 1 | X | 10 |

| Sheet D | 1 | 2 | 3 | 4 | 5 | 6 | 7 | 8 | 9 | 10 | Final |
|---|---|---|---|---|---|---|---|---|---|---|---|
| Newfoundland and Labrador (Cunningham) | 1 | 0 | 0 | 0 | 1 | 0 | 0 | 0 | X | X | 2 |
| Ontario (Homan) | 0 | 1 | 1 | 4 | 0 | 2 | 5 | 0 | X | X | 13 |

| Sheet G | 1 | 2 | 3 | 4 | 5 | 6 | 7 | 8 | 9 | 10 | Final |
|---|---|---|---|---|---|---|---|---|---|---|---|
| Nova Scotia (LeGay) | 0 | 0 | 0 | 0 | 2 | 0 | 0 | 0 | X | X | 2 |
| Saskatchewan (Paulsen) | 1 | 1 | 1 | 0 | 0 | 4 | 1 | 0 | X | X | 8 |

Draw 4

| Sheet A | 1 | 2 | 3 | 4 | 5 | 6 | 7 | 8 | 9 | 10 | Final |
|---|---|---|---|---|---|---|---|---|---|---|---|
| Alberta (Chyz) | 2 | 0 | 4 | 2 | 0 | 4 | 0 | X | X | X | 12 |
| Quebec (Lapierre) | 0 | 3 | 0 | 0 | 1 | 0 | 0 | X | X | X | 4 |

| Sheet C | 1 | 2 | 3 | 4 | 5 | 6 | 7 | 8 | 9 | 10 | Final |
|---|---|---|---|---|---|---|---|---|---|---|---|
| Northern Ontario (Lilly) | 0 | 1 | 0 | 2 | 0 | 3 | 2 | 0 | 1 | 2 | 11 |
| British Columbia (Sivertson) | 2 | 0 | 3 | 0 | 2 | 0 | 0 | 1 | 0 | 0 | 8 |

| Sheet F | 1 | 2 | 3 | 4 | 5 | 6 | 7 | 8 | 9 | 10 | 11 | Final |
|---|---|---|---|---|---|---|---|---|---|---|---|---|
| Yukon (Koltun) | 0 | 1 | 2 | 0 | 0 | 1 | 0 | 1 | 0 | 1 | 0 | 6 |
| Saskatchewan (Paulsen) | 1 | 0 | 0 | 2 | 0 | 0 | 1 | 0 | 2 | 0 | 3 | 9 |

| Sheet G | 1 | 2 | 3 | 4 | 5 | 6 | 7 | 8 | 9 | 10 | Final |
|---|---|---|---|---|---|---|---|---|---|---|---|
| Northwest Territories (Moizis) | 0 | 0 | 1 | 0 | 0 | 0 | 2 | 1 | 0 | X | 4 |
| Manitoba (Meakin) | 4 | 1 | 0 | 3 | 3 | 3 | 0 | 0 | 5 | X | 19 |

Draw 5

| Sheet B | 1 | 2 | 3 | 4 | 5 | 6 | 7 | 8 | 9 | 10 | Final |
|---|---|---|---|---|---|---|---|---|---|---|---|
| Newfoundland and Labrador (Cunningham) | 1 | 2 | 2 | 0 | 3 | 0 | 1 | 0 | X | X | 9 |
| Nova Scotia (LeGay) | 0 | 0 | 0 | 1 | 0 | 1 | 0 | 0 | X | X | 2 |

| Sheet C | 1 | 2 | 3 | 4 | 5 | 6 | 7 | 8 | 9 | 10 | Final |
|---|---|---|---|---|---|---|---|---|---|---|---|
| Prince Edward Island (Fullerton) | 2 | 0 | 0 | 0 | 2 | 0 | 4 | 0 | 3 | X | 11 |
| Manitoba (Meakin) | 0 | 0 | 2 | 0 | 0 | 1 | 0 | 1 | 0 | X | 4 |

| Sheet F | 1 | 2 | 3 | 4 | 5 | 6 | 7 | 8 | 9 | 10 | Final |
|---|---|---|---|---|---|---|---|---|---|---|---|
| New Brunswick (Daigle) | 0 | 0 | 1 | 0 | 0 | 2 | 1 | 0 | 0 | 1 | 5 |
| Quebec (Lapierre) | 0 | 0 | 0 | 0 | 1 | 0 | 0 | 2 | 1 | 0 | 4 |

| Sheet G | 1 | 2 | 3 | 4 | 5 | 6 | 7 | 8 | 9 | 10 | Final |
|---|---|---|---|---|---|---|---|---|---|---|---|
| Ontario (Homan) | 0 | 1 | 0 | 2 | 0 | 4 | 0 | 0 | 2 | X | 9 |
| Yukon (Koltun) | 0 | 0 | 1 | 0 | 1 | 0 | 2 | 1 | 0 | X | 5 |

Draw 6

| Sheet B | 1 | 2 | 3 | 4 | 5 | 6 | 7 | 8 | 9 | 10 | Final |
|---|---|---|---|---|---|---|---|---|---|---|---|
| Saskatchewan (Paulsen) | 3 | 0 | 4 | 0 | 2 | 2 | 2 | 0 | X | X | 13 |
| Northwest Territories (Moizis) | 0 | 2 | 0 | 1 | 0 | 0 | 0 | 0 | X | X | 3 |

| Sheet C | 1 | 2 | 3 | 4 | 5 | 6 | 7 | 8 | 9 | 10 | Final |
|---|---|---|---|---|---|---|---|---|---|---|---|
| Nova Scotia (LeGay) | 0 | 2 | 0 | 0 | 0 | 1 | 0 | 0 | 0 | X | 3 |
| Alberta (Chyz) | 2 | 0 | 2 | 0 | 0 | 0 | 1 | 0 | 1 | X | 6 |

| Sheet F | 1 | 2 | 3 | 4 | 5 | 6 | 7 | 8 | 9 | 10 | Final |
|---|---|---|---|---|---|---|---|---|---|---|---|
| British Columbia (Sivertson) | 0 | 0 | 0 | 1 | 0 | 2 | 0 | 1 | 1 | 4 | 9 |
| Prince Edward Island (Fullerton) | 0 | 0 | 0 | 0 | 3 | 0 | 2 | 0 | 0 | 0 | 5 |

| Sheet G | 1 | 2 | 3 | 4 | 5 | 6 | 7 | 8 | 9 | 10 | Final |
|---|---|---|---|---|---|---|---|---|---|---|---|
| New Brunswick (Daigle) | 0 | 0 | 0 | 2 | 0 | 0 | 0 | X | X | X | 2 |
| Northern Ontario (Lilly) | 3 | 0 | 1 | 0 | 2 | 3 | 0 | X | X | X | 9 |

Draw 7

| Sheet B | 1 | 2 | 3 | 4 | 5 | 6 | 7 | 8 | 9 | 10 | Final |
|---|---|---|---|---|---|---|---|---|---|---|---|
| Ontario (Homan) | 1 | 0 | 0 | 1 | 0 | 0 | 0 | 1 | 0 | 3 | 6 |
| Manitoba (Meakin) | 0 | 0 | 0 | 0 | 1 | 1 | 0 | 0 | 2 | 0 | 4 |

| Sheet D | 1 | 2 | 3 | 4 | 5 | 6 | 7 | 8 | 9 | 10 | Final |
|---|---|---|---|---|---|---|---|---|---|---|---|
| Northwest Territories (Moizis) | 0 | 0 | 0 | 1 | 1 | 0 | 0 | 0 | X | X | 2 |
| Yukon (Koltun) | 4 | 4 | 1 | 0 | 0 | 3 | 2 | 0 | X | X | 14 |

| Sheet E | 1 | 2 | 3 | 4 | 5 | 6 | 7 | 8 | 9 | 10 | Final |
|---|---|---|---|---|---|---|---|---|---|---|---|
| Newfoundland and Labrador (Cunningham) | 1 | 1 | 0 | 0 | 2 | 1 | 0 | 3 | 0 | X | 8 |
| Alberta (Chyz) | 0 | 0 | 0 | 1 | 0 | 0 | 1 | 0 | 0 | X | 2 |

| Sheet G | 1 | 2 | 3 | 4 | 5 | 6 | 7 | 8 | 9 | 10 | Final |
|---|---|---|---|---|---|---|---|---|---|---|---|
| Quebec (Lapierre) | 0 | 2 | 0 | 1 | 0 | 0 | 2 | 2 | 0 | 0 | 7 |
| British Columbia (Sivertson) | 2 | 0 | 2 | 0 | 2 | 1 | 0 | 0 | 1 | 1 | 9 |

Draw 8

| Sheet B | 1 | 2 | 3 | 4 | 5 | 6 | 7 | 8 | 9 | 10 | Final |
|---|---|---|---|---|---|---|---|---|---|---|---|
| Alberta (Chyz) | 3 | 0 | 1 | 1 | 0 | 2 | 0 | 2 | 0 | X | 9 |
| New Brunswick (Daigle) | 0 | 1 | 0 | 0 | 1 | 0 | 1 | 0 | 3 | X | 6 |

| Sheet D | 1 | 2 | 3 | 4 | 5 | 6 | 7 | 8 | 9 | 10 | Final |
|---|---|---|---|---|---|---|---|---|---|---|---|
| British Columbia (Sivertson) | 0 | 0 | 1 | 0 | 1 | 4 | 0 | 0 | 2 | 0 | 8 |
| Saskatchewan (Paulsen) | 0 | 3 | 0 | 2 | 0 | 0 | 2 | 1 | 0 | 3 | 11 |

| Sheet F | 1 | 2 | 3 | 4 | 5 | 6 | 7 | 8 | 9 | 10 | Final |
|---|---|---|---|---|---|---|---|---|---|---|---|
| Northern Ontario (Lilly) | 6 | 3 | 3 | 3 | 1 | 0 | 0 | X | X | X | 16 |
| Northwest Territories (Moizis) | 0 | 0 | 0 | 0 | 0 | 2 | 0 | X | X | X | 2 |

| Sheet H | 1 | 2 | 3 | 4 | 5 | 6 | 7 | 8 | 9 | 10 | Final |
|---|---|---|---|---|---|---|---|---|---|---|---|
| Prince Edward Island (Fullerton) | 2 | 0 | 0 | 0 | 0 | 1 | 0 | 1 | 0 | X | 4 |
| Nova Scotia (LeGay) | 0 | 0 | 0 | 0 | 4 | 0 | 2 | 0 | 2 | X | 8 |

Draw 9

| Sheet B | 1 | 2 | 3 | 4 | 5 | 6 | 7 | 8 | 9 | 10 | Final |
|---|---|---|---|---|---|---|---|---|---|---|---|
| Quebec (Lapierre) | 0 | 0 | 1 | 0 | 1 | 0 | 1 | 1 | 0 | X | 4 |
| Prince Edward Island (Fullerton) | 2 | 1 | 0 | 1 | 0 | 1 | 0 | 0 | 3 | X | 8 |

| Sheet C | 1 | 2 | 3 | 4 | 5 | 6 | 7 | 8 | 9 | 10 | Final |
|---|---|---|---|---|---|---|---|---|---|---|---|
| Ontario (Homan) | 0 | 1 | 0 | 3 | 2 | 0 | 1 | 1 | 0 | X | 8 |
| New Brunswick (Daigle) | 0 | 0 | 2 | 0 | 0 | 2 | 0 | 0 | 0 | X | 4 |

| Sheet E | 1 | 2 | 3 | 4 | 5 | 6 | 7 | 8 | 9 | 10 | Final |
|---|---|---|---|---|---|---|---|---|---|---|---|
| Yukon (Koltun) | 0 | 0 | 0 | 0 | 0 | 1 | 1 | 1 | 0 | 3 | 6 |
| Nova Scotia (LeGay) | 0 | 1 | 1 | 1 | 0 | 0 | 0 | 0 | 1 | 0 | 4 |

| Sheet H | 1 | 2 | 3 | 4 | 5 | 6 | 7 | 8 | 9 | 10 | Final |
|---|---|---|---|---|---|---|---|---|---|---|---|
| Manitoba (Meakin) | 1 | 0 | 1 | 0 | 1 | 2 | 0 | 2 | 0 | 2 | 9 |
| Newfoundland and Labrador (Cunningham) | 0 | 1 | 0 | 3 | 0 | 0 | 1 | 0 | 1 | 0 | 6 |

Draw 10

| Sheet A | 1 | 2 | 3 | 4 | 5 | 6 | 7 | 8 | 9 | 10 | Final |
|---|---|---|---|---|---|---|---|---|---|---|---|
| Nova Scotia (LeGay) | 7 | 6 | 0 | 5 | 0 | 4 | 0 | X | X | X | 22 |
| Northwest Territories (Moizis) | 0 | 0 | 1 | 0 | 1 | 0 | 0 | X | X | X | 2 |

| Sheet D | 1 | 2 | 3 | 4 | 5 | 6 | 7 | 8 | 9 | 10 | Final |
|---|---|---|---|---|---|---|---|---|---|---|---|
| Prince Edward Island (Fullerton) | 0 | 2 | 0 | 0 | 0 | 0 | 1 | 0 | X | X | 3 |
| Northern Ontario (Lilly) | 3 | 0 | 2 | 1 | 3 | 1 | 0 | 0 | X | X | 10 |

| Sheet E | 1 | 2 | 3 | 4 | 5 | 6 | 7 | 8 | 9 | 10 | 11 | Final |
|---|---|---|---|---|---|---|---|---|---|---|---|---|
| British Columbia (Sivertson) | 0 | 0 | 1 | 0 | 2 | 1 | 0 | 1 | 1 | 0 | 0 | 6 |
| New Brunswick (Daigle) | 0 | 2 | 0 | 1 | 0 | 0 | 1 | 0 | 0 | 2 | 1 | 7 |

| Sheet H | 1 | 2 | 3 | 4 | 5 | 6 | 7 | 8 | 9 | 10 | Final |
|---|---|---|---|---|---|---|---|---|---|---|---|
| Saskatchewan (Paulsen) | 1 | 0 | 0 | 4 | 1 | 0 | 2 | 0 | 0 | 1 | 9 |
| Alberta (Chyz) | 0 | 3 | 1 | 0 | 0 | 1 | 0 | 1 | 2 | 0 | 8 |

Draw 11

| Sheet B | 1 | 2 | 3 | 4 | 5 | 6 | 7 | 8 | 9 | 10 | Final |
|---|---|---|---|---|---|---|---|---|---|---|---|
| British Columbia (Sivertson) | 0 | 1 | 1 | 1 | 3 | 3 | 1 | X | X | X | 10 |
| Yukon (Koltun) | 1 | 0 | 0 | 0 | 0 | 0 | 0 | X | X | X | 1 |

| Sheet D | 1 | 2 | 3 | 4 | 5 | 6 | 7 | 8 | 9 | 10 | Final |
|---|---|---|---|---|---|---|---|---|---|---|---|
| Quebec (Lapierre) | 0 | 2 | 0 | 1 | 0 | 1 | 0 | 3 | 2 | X | 9 |
| Newfoundland and Labrador (Cunningham) | 2 | 0 | 1 | 0 | 1 | 0 | 1 | 0 | 0 | X | 5 |

| Sheet F | 1 | 2 | 3 | 4 | 5 | 6 | 7 | 8 | 9 | 10 | Final |
|---|---|---|---|---|---|---|---|---|---|---|---|
| Alberta (Chyz) | 1 | 0 | 0 | 2 | 0 | 2 | 0 | 2 | 0 | 1 | 8 |
| Manitoba (Meakin) | 0 | 0 | 1 | 0 | 1 | 0 | 2 | 0 | 2 | 0 | 6 |

| Sheet H | 1 | 2 | 3 | 4 | 5 | 6 | 7 | 8 | 9 | 10 | Final |
|---|---|---|---|---|---|---|---|---|---|---|---|
| Ontario (Homan) | 5 | 3 | 4 | 0 | 4 | 3 | X | X | X | X | 19 |
| Northwest Territories (Moizis) | 0 | 0 | 0 | 1 | 0 | 0 | X | X | X | X | 1 |

Draw 12

| Sheet A | 1 | 2 | 3 | 4 | 5 | 6 | 7 | 8 | 9 | 10 | Final |
|---|---|---|---|---|---|---|---|---|---|---|---|
| New Brunswick (Daigle) | 0 | 1 | 0 | 0 | 2 | 0 | 0 | 1 | 0 | X | 4 |
| Newfoundland and Labrador (Cunningham) | 2 | 0 | 1 | 2 | 0 | 0 | 2 | 0 | 1 | X | 8 |

| Sheet D | 1 | 2 | 3 | 4 | 5 | 6 | 7 | 8 | 9 | 10 | Final |
|---|---|---|---|---|---|---|---|---|---|---|---|
| Manitoba (Meakin) | 0 | 0 | 0 | 0 | 0 | 0 | 0 | 0 | 1 | 0 | 1 |
| Nova Scotia (LeGay) | 0 | 0 | 0 | 0 | 1 | 1 | 1 | 1 | 0 | 1 | 5 |

| Sheet E | 1 | 2 | 3 | 4 | 5 | 6 | 7 | 8 | 9 | 10 | Final |
|---|---|---|---|---|---|---|---|---|---|---|---|
| Prince Edward Island (Fullerton) | 1 | 0 | 3 | 0 | 4 | 0 | 0 | 1 | 0 | 1 | 10 |
| Saskatchewan (Paulsen) | 0 | 1 | 0 | 1 | 0 | 2 | 2 | 0 | 2 | 0 | 8 |

| Sheet H | 1 | 2 | 3 | 4 | 5 | 6 | 7 | 8 | 9 | 10 | Final |
|---|---|---|---|---|---|---|---|---|---|---|---|
| Quebec (Lapierre) | 2 | 0 | 2 | 0 | 0 | 1 | 0 | 1 | 0 | X | 6 |
| Northern Ontario (Lilly) | 0 | 1 | 0 | 1 | 1 | 0 | 2 | 0 | 3 | X | 8 |

Draw 13

| Sheet A | 1 | 2 | 3 | 4 | 5 | 6 | 7 | 8 | 9 | 10 | Final |
|---|---|---|---|---|---|---|---|---|---|---|---|
| Quebec (Lapierre) | 0 | 0 | 2 | 0 | 1 | 0 | 0 | 2 | 0 | X | 5 |
| Ontario (Homan) | 1 | 2 | 0 | 2 | 0 | 0 | 3 | 0 | 1 | X | 9 |

| Sheet D | 1 | 2 | 3 | 4 | 5 | 6 | 7 | 8 | 9 | 10 | Final |
|---|---|---|---|---|---|---|---|---|---|---|---|
| Yukon (Koltun) | 1 | 0 | 3 | 0 | 0 | 3 | 0 | 0 | 0 | X | 7 |
| Prince Edward Island (Fullerton) | 0 | 1 | 0 | 3 | 0 | 0 | 3 | 1 | 3 | X | 11 |

| Sheet E | 1 | 2 | 3 | 4 | 5 | 6 | 7 | 8 | 9 | 10 | Final |
|---|---|---|---|---|---|---|---|---|---|---|---|
| Northern Ontario (Lilly) | 0 | 0 | 1 | 0 | 0 | 2 | 0 | 1 | 0 | X | 4 |
| Manitoba (Meakin) | 0 | 2 | 0 | 0 | 1 | 0 | 2 | 0 | 1 | X | 6 |

| Sheet H | 1 | 2 | 3 | 4 | 5 | 6 | 7 | 8 | 9 | 10 | Final |
|---|---|---|---|---|---|---|---|---|---|---|---|
| Newfoundland and Labrador (Cunningham) | 1 | 0 | 1 | 0 | 0 | 1 | 0 | 0 | 0 | 0 | 3 |
| Saskatchewan (Paulsen) | 0 | 1 | 0 | 0 | 1 | 0 | 1 | 2 | 0 | 1 | 6 |

Draw 14

| Sheet B | 1 | 2 | 3 | 4 | 5 | 6 | 7 | 8 | 9 | 10 | Final |
|---|---|---|---|---|---|---|---|---|---|---|---|
| New Brunswick (Daigle) | 0 | 0 | 0 | 1 | 0 | 0 | 2 | 0 | 1 | X | 4 |
| Saskatchewan (Paulsen) | 2 | 1 | 1 | 0 | 2 | 0 | 0 | 0 | 0 | X | 6 |

| Sheet C | 1 | 2 | 3 | 4 | 5 | 6 | 7 | 8 | 9 | 10 | Final |
|---|---|---|---|---|---|---|---|---|---|---|---|
| Alberta (Chyz) | 4 | 0 | 0 | 0 | 0 | 0 | 1 | 2 | 0 | X | 7 |
| Prince Edward Island (Fullerton) | 0 | 1 | 1 | 0 | 1 | 0 | 0 | 0 | 1 | X | 4 |

| Sheet F | 1 | 2 | 3 | 4 | 5 | 6 | 7 | 8 | 9 | 10 | Final |
|---|---|---|---|---|---|---|---|---|---|---|---|
| Northwest Territories (Moizis) | 0 | 0 | 0 | 1 | 0 | 0 | X | X | X | X | 1 |
| British Columbia (Sivertson) | 6 | 3 | 2 | 0 | 3 | 1 | X | X | X | X | 15 |

| Sheet G | 1 | 2 | 3 | 4 | 5 | 6 | 7 | 8 | 9 | 10 | Final |
|---|---|---|---|---|---|---|---|---|---|---|---|
| Northern Ontario (Lilly) | 0 | 2 | 0 | 0 | 1 | 1 | 0 | 3 | 0 | X | 7 |
| Nova Scotia (LeGay) | 1 | 0 | 1 | 1 | 0 | 0 | 1 | 0 | 1 | X | 5 |

Draw 15

| Sheet B | 1 | 2 | 3 | 4 | 5 | 6 | 7 | 8 | 9 | 10 | Final |
|---|---|---|---|---|---|---|---|---|---|---|---|
| Northwest Territories (Moizis) | 3 | 0 | 0 | 0 | 0 | 0 | 2 | 0 | X | X | 5 |
| Alberta (Chyz) | 0 | 3 | 2 | 4 | 2 | 2 | 0 | 3 | X | X | 16 |

| Sheet D | 1 | 2 | 3 | 4 | 5 | 6 | 7 | 8 | 9 | 10 | Final |
|---|---|---|---|---|---|---|---|---|---|---|---|
| Ontario (Homan) | 0 | 2 | 0 | 2 | 0 | 2 | 2 | 0 | 0 | 1 | 9 |
| British Columbia (Sivertson) | 1 | 0 | 1 | 0 | 2 | 0 | 0 | 2 | 1 | 0 | 7 |

| Sheet F | 1 | 2 | 3 | 4 | 5 | 6 | 7 | 8 | 9 | 10 | 11 | Final |
|---|---|---|---|---|---|---|---|---|---|---|---|---|
| Newfoundland and Labrador (Cunningham) | 0 | 0 | 2 | 0 | 0 | 0 | 1 | 1 | 1 | 0 | 1 | 6 |
| Yukon (Koltun) | 1 | 0 | 0 | 0 | 1 | 2 | 0 | 0 | 0 | 1 | 0 | 5 |

| Sheet G | 1 | 2 | 3 | 4 | 5 | 6 | 7 | 8 | 9 | 10 | Final |
|---|---|---|---|---|---|---|---|---|---|---|---|
| Manitoba (Meakin) | 2 | 2 | 0 | 0 | 2 | 0 | 0 | 2 | 0 | 0 | 8 |
| Quebec (Lapierre) | 0 | 0 | 1 | 1 | 0 | 2 | 2 | 0 | 2 | 1 | 9 |

Draw 16

| Sheet B | 1 | 2 | 3 | 4 | 5 | 6 | 7 | 8 | 9 | 10 | Final |
|---|---|---|---|---|---|---|---|---|---|---|---|
| Manitoba (Meakin) | 1 | 1 | 0 | 2 | 0 | 2 | 0 | 0 | 0 | 0 | 6 |
| British Columbia (Sivertson) | 0 | 0 | 1 | 0 | 1 | 0 | 2 | 1 | 1 | 1 | 7 |

| Sheet D | 1 | 2 | 3 | 4 | 5 | 6 | 7 | 8 | 9 | 10 | Final |
|---|---|---|---|---|---|---|---|---|---|---|---|
| New Brunswick (Daigle) | 4 | 0 | 0 | 2 | 3 | 3 | 0 | X | X | X | 12 |
| Northwest Territories (Moizis) | 0 | 1 | 1 | 0 | 0 | 0 | 1 | X | X | X | 3 |

| Sheet E | 1 | 2 | 3 | 4 | 5 | 6 | 7 | 8 | 9 | 10 | Final |
|---|---|---|---|---|---|---|---|---|---|---|---|
| Nova Scotia (LeGay) | 1 | 1 | 0 | 1 | 0 | 0 | 2 | 0 | 1 | 0 | 6 |
| Quebec (Lapierre) | 0 | 0 | 1 | 0 | 1 | 2 | 0 | 1 | 0 | 2 | 7 |

| Sheet G | 1 | 2 | 3 | 4 | 5 | 6 | 7 | 8 | 9 | 10 | Final |
|---|---|---|---|---|---|---|---|---|---|---|---|
| Yukon (Koltun) | 0 | 1 | 0 | 1 | 1 | 0 | 0 | 0 | 1 | 0 | 4 |
| Alberta (Chyz) | 1 | 0 | 1 | 0 | 0 | 2 | 0 | 0 | 0 | 2 | 6 |

Draw 17

| Sheet A | 1 | 2 | 3 | 4 | 5 | 6 | 7 | 8 | 9 | 10 | Final |
|---|---|---|---|---|---|---|---|---|---|---|---|
| Northwest Territories (Moizis) | 0 | 0 | 0 | 0 | 0 | 0 | X | X | X | X | 0 |
| Prince Edward Island (Fullerton) | 4 | 2 | 1 | 1 | 2 | 2 | X | X | X | X | 12 |

| Sheet D | 1 | 2 | 3 | 4 | 5 | 6 | 7 | 8 | 9 | 10 | 11 | Final |
|---|---|---|---|---|---|---|---|---|---|---|---|---|
| Northern Ontario (Lilly) | 0 | 0 | 0 | 2 | 0 | 2 | 0 | 0 | 1 | 0 | 0 | 5 |
| Alberta (Chyz) | 0 | 0 | 0 | 0 | 1 | 0 | 3 | 1 | 0 | 0 | 1 | 6 |

| Sheet F | 1 | 2 | 3 | 4 | 5 | 6 | 7 | 8 | 9 | 10 | Final |
|---|---|---|---|---|---|---|---|---|---|---|---|
| Saskatchewan (Paulsen) | 0 | 4 | 0 | 0 | 1 | 0 | 0 | 1 | 1 | 1 | 8 |
| Ontario (Homan) | 0 | 0 | 2 | 3 | 0 | 2 | 3 | 0 | 0 | 0 | 10 |

| Sheet G | 1 | 2 | 3 | 4 | 5 | 6 | 7 | 8 | 9 | 10 | Final |
|---|---|---|---|---|---|---|---|---|---|---|---|
| British Columbia (Sivertson) | 0 | 0 | 1 | 1 | 1 | 1 | 3 | 0 | 0 | X | 7 |
| Newfoundland and Labrador (Cunningham) | 0 | 1 | 0 | 0 | 0 | 0 | 0 | 1 | 1 | X | 3 |

Draw 18

| Sheet A | 1 | 2 | 3 | 4 | 5 | 6 | 7 | 8 | 9 | 10 | Final |
|---|---|---|---|---|---|---|---|---|---|---|---|
| Northern Ontario (Lilly) | 0 | 3 | 0 | 0 | 1 | 0 | 0 | 2 | 0 | 2 | 8 |
| Yukon (Koltun) | 1 | 0 | 1 | 1 | 0 | 1 | 0 | 0 | 2 | 0 | 6 |

| Sheet D | 1 | 2 | 3 | 4 | 5 | 6 | 7 | 8 | 9 | 10 | Final |
|---|---|---|---|---|---|---|---|---|---|---|---|
| Saskatchewan (Paulsen) | 0 | 3 | 0 | 0 | 1 | 0 | 0 | 5 | 1 | X | 10 |
| Quebec (Lapierre) | 1 | 0 | 1 | 1 | 0 | 3 | 1 | 0 | 0 | X | 7 |

| Sheet F | 1 | 2 | 3 | 4 | 5 | 6 | 7 | 8 | 9 | 10 | Final |
|---|---|---|---|---|---|---|---|---|---|---|---|
| Manitoba (Meakin) | 1 | 0 | 0 | 1 | 0 | 1 | 1 | 1 | 0 | 1 | 6 |
| New Brunswick (Daigle) | 0 | 3 | 0 | 0 | 2 | 0 | 0 | 0 | 0 | 0 | 5 |

| Sheet H | 1 | 2 | 3 | 4 | 5 | 6 | 7 | 8 | 9 | 10 | Final |
|---|---|---|---|---|---|---|---|---|---|---|---|
| Nova Scotia (LeGay) | 0 | 1 | 0 | 0 | 1 | 0 | 2 | 0 | X | X | 4 |
| Ontario (Homan) | 2 | 0 | 0 | 2 | 0 | 3 | 0 | 2 | X | X | 9 |

Draw 19

| Sheet B | 1 | 2 | 3 | 4 | 5 | 6 | 7 | 8 | 9 | 10 | Final |
|---|---|---|---|---|---|---|---|---|---|---|---|
| Northern Ontario (Lilly) | 0 | 0 | 1 | 0 | 0 | 0 | 1 | 0 | 2 | 1 | 5 |
| Newfoundland and Labrador (Cunningham) | 0 | 1 | 0 | 0 | 0 | 0 | 0 | 1 | 0 | 0 | 2 |

| Sheet C | 1 | 2 | 3 | 4 | 5 | 6 | 7 | 8 | 9 | 10 | 11 | Final |
|---|---|---|---|---|---|---|---|---|---|---|---|---|
| Manitoba (Meakin) | 0 | 0 | 0 | 0 | 0 | 0 | 2 | 1 | 0 | 1 | 1 | 5 |
| Saskatchewan (Paulsen) | 0 | 0 | 0 | 1 | 0 | 1 | 0 | 0 | 2 | 0 | 0 | 4 |

| Sheet E | 1 | 2 | 3 | 4 | 5 | 6 | 7 | 8 | 9 | 10 | Final |
|---|---|---|---|---|---|---|---|---|---|---|---|
| Alberta (Chyz) | 0 | 1 | 0 | 0 | 1 | 0 | 0 | 0 | 0 | X | 2 |
| Ontario (Homan) | 0 | 0 | 1 | 1 | 0 | 2 | 2 | 2 | 0 | X | 8 |

| Sheet H | 1 | 2 | 3 | 4 | 5 | 6 | 7 | 8 | 9 | 10 | Final |
|---|---|---|---|---|---|---|---|---|---|---|---|
| New Brunswick (Daigle) | 0 | 1 | 0 | 2 | 2 | 0 | 2 | 0 | 4 | X | 11 |
| Yukon (Koltun) | 1 | 0 | 1 | 0 | 0 | 2 | 0 | 1 | 0 | X | 5 |

Draw 20

| Sheet A | 1 | 2 | 3 | 4 | 5 | 6 | 7 | 8 | 9 | 10 | Final |
|---|---|---|---|---|---|---|---|---|---|---|---|
| British Columbia (Sivertson) | 0 | 3 | 0 | 3 | 0 | 1 | 0 | 1 | X | X | 8 |
| Nova Scotia (LeGay) | 0 | 0 | 1 | 0 | 1 | 0 | 1 | 0 | X | X | 3 |

| Sheet C | 1 | 2 | 3 | 4 | 5 | 6 | 7 | 8 | 9 | 10 | Final |
|---|---|---|---|---|---|---|---|---|---|---|---|
| Yukon (Koltun) | 1 | 2 | 1 | 1 | 0 | 2 | 0 | 4 | X | X | 11 |
| Quebec (Lapierre) | 0 | 0 | 0 | 0 | 2 | 0 | 1 | 0 | X | X | 3 |

| Sheet E | 1 | 2 | 3 | 4 | 5 | 6 | 7 | 8 | 9 | 10 | Final |
|---|---|---|---|---|---|---|---|---|---|---|---|
| Northwest Territories (Moizis) | 1 | 1 | 0 | 0 | 0 | 0 | 0 | X | X | X | 2 |
| Newfoundland and Labrador (Cunningham) | 0 | 0 | 0 | 2 | 2 | 5 | 2 | X | X | X | 11 |

| Sheet G | 1 | 2 | 3 | 4 | 5 | 6 | 7 | 8 | 9 | 10 | Final |
|---|---|---|---|---|---|---|---|---|---|---|---|
| Prince Edward Island (Fullerton) | 1 | 0 | 0 | 1 | 0 | 1 | 0 | 0 | 0 | X | 3 |
| Ontario (Homan) | 0 | 2 | 0 | 0 | 2 | 0 | 3 | 2 | 3 | X | 12 |

== Playoffs ==
Tiebreaker #1
'British Columbia | 12
Alberta | 1

Tiebreaker #2
British Columbia | 6
Saskatchewan | 3

Semifinal
British Columbia | 4
Northern Ontario | 3

Final
Ontario | 9
British Columbia | 5

=== Tiebreaker #1 ===
| Sheet G | 1 | 2 | 3 | 4 | 5 | 6 | 7 | 8 | 9 | 10 | Final |
|---|---|---|---|---|---|---|---|---|---|---|---|
| British Columbia (Sivertson) | 2 | 1 | 3 | 0 | 3 | 3 | X | X | X | X | 12 |
| Alberta (Chyz) | 0 | 0 | 0 | 1 | 0 | 0 | X | X | X | X | 1 |

Player percentages
| British Columbia | | Alberta | |
|---|---|---|---|
| Brandi Tinkler | 69% | Kimberly Anderson | 90% |
| Jessie Sanderson | 90% | Kristina Hadden | 71% |
| Simone Brosseau | 92% | Rebecca Pattison | 54% |
| Dailene Sivertson | 83% | Nadine Chyz | 35% |
| Total | 83% | Total | 63% |

=== Tiebreaker #2 ===
| Sheet B | 1 | 2 | 3 | 4 | 5 | 6 | 7 | 8 | 9 | 10 | Final |
|---|---|---|---|---|---|---|---|---|---|---|---|
| British Columbia (Sivertson) | 1 | 0 | 1 | 2 | 0 | 1 | 0 | 1 | 0 | X | 6 |
| Saskatchewan (Paulsen) | 0 | 0 | 0 | 0 | 1 | 0 | 1 | 0 | 1 | X | 3 |

Player percentages
| British Columbia | | Saskatchewan | |
|---|---|---|---|
| Brandi Tinkler | 89% | Kari Paulsen | 79% |
| Jessie Sanderson | 73% | Sarah Collin | 78% |
| Simone Brosseau | 88% | Melissa Hoffman | 75% |
| Dailene Sivertson | 88% | Trish Paulsen | 64% |
| Total | 84% | Total | 74% |

=== Semifinal ===
| Sheet D | 1 | 2 | 3 | 4 | 5 | 6 | 7 | 8 | 9 | 10 | 11 | Final |
|---|---|---|---|---|---|---|---|---|---|---|---|---|
| British Columbia (Sivertson) | 0 | 0 | 0 | 0 | 0 | 1 | 0 | 1 | 0 | 1 | 1 | 4 |
| Northern Ontario (Lilly) | 0 | 0 | 0 | 0 | 1 | 0 | 1 | 0 | 1 | 0 | 0 | 3 |

Player percentages
| British Columbia | | Northern Ontario | |
|---|---|---|---|
| Brandi Tinkler | 78% | Kaitlynd Burns | 89% |
| Jessie Sanderson | 65% | Jennifer Gates | 88% |
| Simone Brosseau | 83% | Kim Curtin | 72% |
| Dailene Sivertson | 85% | Kendra Lilly | 75% |
| Total | 78% | Total | 81% |

=== Final ===
| Sheet C | 1 | 2 | 3 | 4 | 5 | 6 | 7 | 8 | 9 | 10 | Final |
|---|---|---|---|---|---|---|---|---|---|---|---|
| Ontario (Homan) | 0 | 2 | 1 | 0 | 1 | 3 | 0 | 2 | 0 | X | 9 |
| British Columbia (Sivertson) | 0 | 0 | 0 | 3 | 0 | 0 | 1 | 0 | 1 | X | 5 |

Player percentages
| Ontario | | British Columbia | |
|---|---|---|---|
| Lynn Kreviazuk | 78% | Brandi Tinkler | 90% |
| Laura Crocker | 66% | Jessie Sanderson | 60% |
| Emma Miskew | 79% | Simone Brosseau | 76% |
| Rachel Homan | 89% | Dailene Sivertson | 76% |
| Total | 78% | Total | 76% |

== Qualification ==
=== Ontario ===
The Pepsi Ontario Junior Curling Championships were held January 2–6 at the Teeswater Curling Club in Teeswater.

Rachel Homan and her rink from the Ottawa Curling Club defeated Clancy Grandy of Guelph 8-4 in the women's final. Grandy had beaten Jenna Harrington of Dundas in the semifinal. Homan finished the round robin with a 6-1 record while Grandy and Harrington had 5-2 records. In the men's final, Jake Walker out of the Westmount club defeated Mathew Camm of Navan 7-1. Walker won his semifinal match against the Rideau Curling Club's Kurtis Byrd rink 5-4. Byrd made the playoffs after winning a tiebreaker against Michael Bryson of the Annandale Country Club, 8-7.
