= 2013 Yukon/NWT Men's Curling Championship =

- Host city: Fort Smith, Northwest Territories
- Arena: Fort Smith Curling Club
- Dates: January 11–13
- Winner: Jamie Koe
- Curling club: Yellowknife Curling Club, Yellowknife
- Skip: Jamie Koe
- Third: Tom Naugler
- Second: Brad Chorostkowski
- Lead: Robert Borden
- Coach: Terry Shea
- Finalist: Greg Skauge

The 2013 Yukon/NWT Men's Curling Championship was held from January 11 to 13 at the Fort Smith Curling Club in Fort Smith, Northwest Territories. The winning team, skipped by Jamie Koe, represented the Northwest Territories and the Yukon at the 2013 Tim Hortons Brier in Edmonton, Alberta.

Since the Yukon Curling Association declared that Yukon would not be fielding any teams for the event, the Northwest Territories Men's Championship constituted the Yukon/NWT Men's Curling Championship.

== Teams ==
Skip	Third	Second	Lead	Locale
Nick Kaeser	Tim McDonald	Craig Browne	Robert Mills	Fort Smith Curling Club, Fort Smith
Jamie Koe	Tom Naugler	Brad Chorostkowski	Robert Borden	Yellowknife Curling Club, Yellowknife
Bruce McArthur	Jim Lockhart	Darryl McArthur	Frank Lepine	Fort Smith Curling Club, Fort Smith
Greg Skauge	Ron Delmage	Derek Elkin	Jim Sosiak	Yellowknife Curling Club, Yellowknife
Kevin Whitehead	Steve Moss	Scott Alexander	Roshan Begg	Yellowknife Curling Club, Yellowknife

== Round-robin standings ==
Final round-robin standings

Skip (Club)	W	L	PF	PA	Ends Won	Ends Lost	Blank Ends
Jamie Koe (Yellowknife)	4	0	37	10	18	8	5
Greg Skauge (Yellowknife)	2	2	29	26	17	17	5
Kevin Whitehead (Yellowknife)	2	2	19	25	9	18	11
Bruce McArthur (Fort Smith)	1	3	17	32	12	16	11
Nick Kaeser (Fort Smith)	1	3	23	32	18	15	1

== Round-robin results ==
All draw times are listed in Mountain Standard Time (UTC-7).

=== Draw 1 ===
Friday, January 11, 1:30 pm

Sheet 2	1	2	3	4	5	6	7	8	9	10	Final
Bruce McArthur	0	1	0	1	0	0	1	0	X	X	3
Jamie Koe	4	0	2	0	3	3	0	1	X	X	13

Sheet 3	1	2	3	4	5	6	7	8	9	10	Final
Kevin Whitehead	0	1	0	0	0	0	0	0	4	X	5
Nick Kaeser	1	0	0	1	1	1	1	1	0	X	6

=== Draw 2 ===
Friday, January 11, 6:00 pm

Sheet 1	1	2	3	4	5	6	7	8	9	10	Final
Bruce McArthur	0	3	0	1	0	0	2	2	0	X	8
Nick Kaeser	1	0	2	0	2	1	0	0	1	X	7

Sheet 2	1	2	3	4	5	6	7	8	9	10	11	Final
Greg Skauge	1	0	0	0	2	0	2	0	2	1	0	8
Kevin Whitehead	0	1	0	2	0	4	0	1	0	0	1	9

=== Draw 3 ===
Saturday, January 12, 12:30 pm

Sheet 1	1	2	3	4	5	6	7	8	9	10	Final
Jamie Koe	2	0	2	1	2	0	1	2	X	X	10
Kevin Whitehead	0	3	0	0	0	0	0	0	X	X	3

Sheet 2	1	2	3	4	5	6	7	8	9	10	Final
Nick Kaeser	0	3	0	0	1	1	0	2	1	0	8
Greg Skauge	1	0	2	2	0	0	3	0	0	1	9

=== Draw 4 ===
Saturday, January 12, 4:30 pm

Sheet 1	1	2	3	4	5	6	7	8	9	10	Final
Greg Skauge	0	2	0	3	1	1	0	0	3	X	10
Bruce McArthur	1	0	1	0	0	0	1	2	0	X	5

Sheet 3	1	2	3	4	5	6	7	8	9	10	Final
Nick Kaeser	0	1	0	1	0	0	X	X	X	X	2
Jamie Koe	3	0	2	0	2	3	X	X	X	X	10

=== Draw 5 ===
Sunday, January 13, 8:30 am

Sheet 2	1	2	3	4	5	6	7	8	9	10	Final
Kevin Whitehead	0	0	0	0	0	0	0	0	1	0	1
Bruce McArthur	0	0	0	0	0	0	0	0	0	2	2

Sheet 3	1	2	3	4	5	6	7	8	9	10	Final
Jamie Koe	2	1	0	1	0	0	0	0	0	X	4
Greg Skauge	0	0	1	0	1	0	0	0	0	X	2
