= Yukon/NWT Men's Curling Championship =

The Yukon/NWT Men's Curling Championship was the men's curling championship that determined Team Yukon/NWT at the Tim Hortons Brier. The tournament featured teams from two of Canada's northern territories, the Northwest Territories (NWT) and the Yukon. The event was discontinued before 2015 when each territory was granted its own entry into the Brier. It was replaced by the Northwest Territories Men's Curling Championship and the Yukon Men's Curling Championship.

The territories first participated in the 1975 Macdonald Brier.

== Qualification ==
Four teams played in the territories championship. Both the Northwest Territories and the Yukon held separate territorial championships, and the top two teams from each territory then play at the Yukon/NWT championship.

Prior to 1975, teams in the Yukon played in the B.C. provincial playdowns and teams in the Northwest Territories played in the Alberta playdowns.

== Winners ==
Year	Skip	Winning club	Brier record (place)
2014	Jamie Koe	(Northwest Territories) Yellowknife Curling Club	3–8 (10th)
2013	Jamie Koe	(Northwest Territories) Yellowknife Curling Club	5–6 (7th)
2012	Jamie Koe	(Northwest Territories) Yellowknife Curling Club	7–6 (Note: Lost 3 vs. 4 game to Alberta (K. Koe) and lost bronze medal game to Manitoba (Fowler)) (4th)
2011	Jamie Koe	(Northwest Territories) Yellowknife Curling Club	3–8 (11th)
2010	Jamie Koe	(Northwest Territories) Yellowknife Curling Club	1–10 (12th)
2009	Jamie Koe	(Northwest Territories) Yellowknife Curling Club	3–8 (9th)
2008	Chad Cowan	(Yukon) Whitehorse Curling Club	2–9 (12th)
2007	Jamie Koe	(Northwest Territories) Yellowknife Curling Club	5–6 (7th)
2006	Jamie Koe	(Northwest Territories) Yellowknife Curling Club	6–5 (5th)
2005	Steve Moss	(Northwest Territories) Yellowknife Curling Club	0–11 (12th)
2004	Brian Wasnea	(Yukon) Whitehorse Curling Club	0–11 (12th)
2003	Chad Cowan	(Yukon) Whitehorse Curling Club	3–8 (11th)
2002	Jonathon Solberg	(Yukon) Whitehorse Curling Club	3–8 (10th)
2001	Steve Moss	(Northwest Territories) Yellowknife Curling Club	0–11 (12th)
2000	Chad Cowan	(Yukon) Whitehorse Curling Club	3–8 (9th)
1999	Orest Peech	(Yukon) Whitehorse Curling Club	0–11 (12th)
1998	Trevor Alexander	(Northwest Territories) Yellowknife Curling Club	1–10 (12th)
1997	Lonnie Kofoed	(Yukon) Whitehorse Curling Club	4–7 (9th)
1996	Richard Robertson	(Northwest Territories) Yellowknife Curling Club	1–10 (12th)
1995	Robert Andrews	(British Columbia) Atlin Curling Club	2–9 (11th)
1994	Robert Andrews	(British Columbia) Atlin Curling Club	2–9 (11th)
1993	Trevor Alexander	(Northwest Territories) Yellowknife Curling Club	3–8 (11th)
1992	Steve Moss	(Northwest Territories) Yellowknife Curling Club	3–8 (11th)
1991	Chuck Haines	(Yukon) Whitehorse Curling Club	3–8 (11th)
1990	Trevor Alexander	(Northwest Territories) Yellowknife Curling Club	3–8 (12th)
1989	Al Delmage	(Northwest Territories) Yellowknife Curling Club	3–8 (9th)
1988	Trevor Alexander	(Northwest Territories) Yellowknife Curling Club	1–10 (12th)
1987	Al Delmage	(Northwest Territories) Yellowknife Curling Club	5–6 (9th)
1986	Klaus Schoenne	(Northwest Territories) Yellowknife Curling Club	3–8 (10th)
1985	Al Delmage	(Northwest Territories) Yellowknife Curling Club	6–6 (Note: Lost tie-breaker) (6th)
1984	Al Delmage	(Northwest Territories) Yellowknife Curling Club	3–8 (11th)
1983	Don Strang	(Northwest Territories) Yellowknife Curling Club	3–8 (11th)
1982	Paul Hunter	(Yukon) Takhini Curling Club	3–8 (11th)
1981	Chuck Haines	(Yukon) Whitehorse Curling Club	4–7 (9th)
1980	Al Delmage	(Northwest Territories) Yellowknife Curling Club	5–6 (6th)
1979	Don Strang	(Northwest Territories) Yellowknife Curling Club	2–9 (12th)
1978	Howie Brazeau	(Northwest Territories) Fort Smith Curling Club	5–6 (T6th)
1977	Don Twa	(Yukon) Whitehorse Curling Club	5–6 (T7th)
1976	Howie Brazeau	(Northwest Territories) Fort Smith Curling Club	5–6 (T7th)
1975	Don Twa	(Yukon) Whitehorse Curling Club	8–3 (T2nd)
