= Kerr Drummond =

Scottish-Canadian curler (born 1991)

- Curler
- Born: June 27, 1997 (age 29); Forfar, Scotland

Team
- Curling club: Airdrie CC, Airdrie, AB
- Skip: Cameron Bryce
- Third: Karsten Sturmay
- Second: Kerr Drummond
- Lead: Scott Hyslop
- Alternate: Robin McCall

Curling career
- Member Association: Scotland (2009–2013); Alberta (2022–2024); Yukon (2024–2026)
- Brier: 3 (2024, 2025, 2026)
- Top CTRS ranking: 7th (2022–23; 2023–24)
Medal record
Men's curling
Representing Scotland
World Junior Curling Championships
Silver medal – second place	2010 Flims
Bronze medal – third place	2012 Östersund
Representing United Kingdom
European Youth Olympic Festival
Silver medal – second place	2009 Bielsko-Biała

Kerr Drummond (born June 27, 1991) is a Scottish–Canadian curler from Red Deer, Alberta. He currently plays second on Team Cameron Bryce.

== Junior career in Scotland ==
Drummond's fist international experience came at the 2009 European Youth Olympic Winter Festival, where he played lead for Team Great Britain, which was skipped by Colin Dick. The team finished 4–1 in group play, and then beat Norway (skipped by Sander Rølvåg) in the semifinal before losing to Switzerland (skipped by Roger Gulka) in the final.

The following year, Drummond won the Scottish Junior Curling Championships, playing lead for the Ally Fraser rink. The team represented Scotland at the 2010 World Junior Curling Championships, where they led the round robin portion with an 8–1 record. The team then beat China (skipped by Ji Yansong) in the page playoff 1 vs. 2 game, but lost to Switzerland (skipped by Peter de Cruz) in the final.

In 2011, Drummond played lead for Great Britain at the 2011 Winter Universiade, on a team skipped by Glen Muirhead. There, the team finished the round robin with a 7–2 record, in a three-way tie for first. In the playoffs, the team lost the semifinal against Switzerland (skipped by Pascal Hess) and the bronze medal game to the Czech Republic (skipped by Lukáš Klíma).

The next season, Drummond won a second Scottish junior title, playing lead for team Kyle Smith. Representing Scotland at the 2012 World Junior Curling Championships, the team finished the round robin with a 7–2 record, putting them in the page playoff 3 vs. 4 game against Norway's Markus Høiberg rink. The team lost the game, but faced the Norwegians again in the bronze medal game, and avenged their loss, taking home the bronze medal.

== Men's career in Canada ==
Drummond moved to Canada in 2013, settling in Calgary at first. He eventually moved to Red Deer, where his wife is from in around 2018.

After moving to Canada, Drummond played one season for the Kevin Park rink, winning the Black Diamond / High River Cash World Curling Tour event in 2015. As he was not yet a citizen, he had to be replaced by friend Dylan Webster at the 2016 Boston Pizza Cup provincial championship.

Drummond joined the Aaron Sluchinski rink in 2017. In their first season together, the team won the Black Diamond / High River Cash and Avonair Cash Spiel events on the World Curling Tour. However, he still could not play with the team in provincial championships because he was not yet a citizen. Drummond finally became a Canadian citizen in 2022, but he did not play for the team at the 2023 Boston Pizza Cup provincial championship due the birth of his daughter, and was replaced on the team by Ted Appelman.

Team Sluchinski began the 2023–24 curling season at the 2023 PointsBet Invitational tournament, organized by Curling Canada. There, the team was eliminated in the "Sweep 16" round against Mike McEwen. The team played in three Grand Slam of Curling events during the season, the 2023 Tour Challenge, the 2023 National and the 2023 Masters, failing to make the playoffs in all three. Later in the season, Drummond won his first Alberta provincial title in 2024, when Team Sluchinksi defeated Kevin Koe in the final in an upset. The team represented one of the Alberta teams at the 2024 Montana's Brier. There, they finished pool play with a 4–4 record.

On March 29, 2024, Drummond announced he was stepping back from competitive curling. He announced that while stepping back from competitive curling, he will join the Thomas Scoffin rink from Yukon.

== Personal life ==
Drummond works as a regional account executive for Rasco FR Canada. He is married and has two daughters. His brother is 2014 Olympic silver medallist curler Greg Drummond, and his sister-in law 2022 Olympic gold medallist curler Vicky Drummond (née Wright).
