= Thomas Scoffin =

Canadian curler (born 1994)

- Curler
- Born: April 25, 1994 (age 32); Sudbury, Ontario

Team
- Curling club: Whitehorse CC, Whitehorse
- Skip: Thomas Scoffin
- Third: TBD
- Second: Trygg Jensen
- Lead: Joe Wallingham

Curling career
- Member Association: Yukon (2005–2012; 2017–present); Alberta (2012–2017)
- Brier: 7 (2018, 2020, 2022, 2023, 2024, 2025, 2026)
Medal record
Curling
Representing Canada
Winter Youth Olympics
Bronze medal – third place	2012 Innsbruck
Representing Yukon
Arctic Winter Games
Gold medal – first place	2008 Yellowknife
Silver medal – second place	2006 Kenai Peninsula
Silver medal – second place	2010 Grande Prairie

Thomas Scoffin (born April 25, 1994 in Sudbury, Ontario) is a Canadian curler from Whitehorse, Yukon. He was the skip of the Canadian mixed team at the 2012 Winter Youth Olympics in Austria.

== Career ==
Scoffin has participated in seven Canadian Junior Curling Championships, having represented the Yukon in six Canadian Junior Curling Championships from 2007 to 2012 and Alberta in 2013. He was the youngest skip in Canadian Junior history, when he played in his first event in 2007 at the age of 12. The team finished in last place with an 1-11 record. In 2008, they improved to a 3-9 record. This record was replicated at the 2009 event. In 2010, they improved once again, finishing with a 5-7 record. This record would be matched in 2011. In the 2012 Canadian Junior Curling Championships the team finished with a 7-5 record in a tie for fifth place. He also played in the 2011 Canada Winter Games, finishing 11th.

In 2012, Scoffin moved to Edmonton, Alberta to attend the University of Alberta. While in Alberta, he won his first Alberta provincial junior championship. At the 2013 Canadian Junior Curling Championships, while skipping Alberta his team finished the round robin competition in first place with a 9-1 record. Team Manitoba defeated Scoffin's Alberta rink 4-3 in the championship game. Scoffin was named to the first team all star as skip. His team consisted of Dylan Gosseau, Landon Bucholz and Bryce Bucholz.

Scoffin has amassed a win loss record at the Canadian Junior Curling Championships of 33-50, placing him tied for fourth with John Morris amongst skips all time.

Scoffin skipped the Yukon team at three Arctic Winter Games, winning gold in 2008 and silver in 2006 and 2010. He also skipped the Yukon team at two Canada Winter Games in 2007 and 2011.

In 2012, he skipped the Canadian team at the Winter Youth Olympics. The team was a mixed team made up of curlers from across the country. They went on to win the bronze medal.

== Personal life ==
Scoffin works as an accountant. He is married to Kim Brown, and has two children. His sister Bayly is a three-time Yukon women's champion and his father Wade is also a curler.
