= 2008 Safeway Championship =

Manitoba men's provincial curling championship

- Host city: Brandon, Manitoba
- Arena: Westman Communications Group Place
- Dates: February 13–17
- Winner: Team Burtnyk
- Curling club: Assiniboine Memorial CC, Winnipeg
- Skip: Kerry Burtnyk
- Third: Dan Kammerlock
- Second: Richard Daneault
- Lead: Garth Smith
- Coach: Rob Meakin
- Finalist: David Bohn

The 2008 Safeway Championship, Manitoba's provincial men's curling championship, was held February 13 to 17 at Westman Communications Group Place in Brandon, Manitoba. The winning Kerry Burtnyk rink represented Manitoba at the 2008 Tim Hortons Brier on home soil in Winnipeg, Manitoba where they missed the playoffs with a 6–5 record.

== Teams ==
The teams are listed as follows:

Skip	Third	Second	Lead	Alternate	Club
Sam Antila	Ian Graham	Curtis Ross	Jonathon Sawatzky		Burntwood CC
Arnold Asham	Nathan Asham	Shawn McCutcheon	James Fulcher	Dean North	Wildewood CC
David Bohn	Dennis Bohn	Andrew Melnuk	Chad Barkman		Assiniboine Memorial CC
Kerry Burtnyk	Dan Kammerlock	Richard Daneault	Garth Smith		Assiniboine Memorial CC
Reid Carruthers	Jason Gunnlaugson	Justin Richter	Tyler Forrest		Beausejour CC
Rob Fleming	Kelly Peterson	Jeff Lacombe	Ron Ford		The Pas CC
Chris Galbraith	Adam Norget	Derek Samagalski	Dan Cox		Rosser CC
Blair Goethals	Kelly McMechan	Don Williams	Dean Laval	Graham Freeman	Deloraine CC
Rae Hainstock	Gerry Haight	Alex Sutherland	Claude Hykawy		Burntwood CC
Kevin Hamblin (Fourth)	Doug Hamblin	David Hamblin	Lorne Hamblin (Skip)		Morris CC
James Kirkness	Brent Braemer	Scott McCams	Greg Melnichuk		Deer Lodge CC
Allan Lyburn	Scott Ramsay	Mark Taylor	Hub Perin		Brandon CC
William Lyburn	Geordie Hargreaves	Cory Barkley	Mike Marshall	Brian Fowler	Brandon CC
Scott Madams	Doug Harrison	Cory Naharine	Terry Derger		Granite CC
Mike McEwen	B.J. Neufeld	Matt Wozniak	Denni Neufeld	A.J. Girardin	Assiniboine Memorial CC
Terry McNamee	Steve Irwin	Travis Taylor	Travis Saban	Kelly Marnoch	Brandon CC
Richard Muntain	Mike McCaughan	Scott Berenz	Shawn Atamanchuk	Rejean Regnier	Charleswood CC
Randy Neufeld	Cory Anderson	Birk Cramer	Scott Podolsky	Jeff Warkentin	La Salle CC
Dean Dunstone (Fourth)	Peter Nicholls (Skip)	Taren Gesell	Wayne Sigurdson	Charlie Salina	West Kildonan CC
Glenn Parrott	Ray Orr	Kent Dillabough	Fred Scott		Minnedosa CC
Daley Peters	Matt Lacriox	Kyle Einarson	Marc Lacriox		Petersfield CC
Vic Peters	Ken Tresoor	Chris Neufeld	Keith Fenton		Fort Garry CC
Kelly Robertson	Doug Armour	Duane Lang	Ace Ross	Jeff Stewart	Neepawa CC
Russell Shackel	Jim Dowsett	Richard Collyer	Dwight King	Don Chatham	Killarney CC
Bob Sigurdson	Darren Oryniak	Alan Purdy	Cory Wolchuk		Assiniboine Memorial CC
Kelly Skinner	Allan Lawn	Darcy Hayward	Trevor Taylor		Hamiota CC
Don Spriggs	Dean Moxham	Barry Pugh	Dale Michie		Portage CC
Jeff Stoughton	Ryan Fry	Rob Fowler	Steve Gould		Charleswood CC
Brendan Taylor	Kyle Werenich	Pat Spiring	Tyler Specula	Kevin Michaluk	Grain Exchange CC
Dave Wallace	Dale Wallace	Dave Keating	Murray Melnyk	Lyle Arrah	Russell CC
Lionel Walz	Bill Menzies	Brian DeRiviere	Mark Venton	Lauire Leclair	Pembina CC
Murray Woodward	Ron Gauthier	Russ Hays	Grant Mistelbacher	Greg McGibbon	Ste. Anne CC

== Knockout Brackets ==
32 team double knockout with playoff round
Four teams qualify each from A Event and B Event

=== A Event ===
First Knockout	Qualifier 1
Kelly Skinner	1
Brendan Taylor	6
Brendan Taylor	6
Kerry Burtnyk	8
Kerry Burtnyk	8
Rob Fleming	4
Kerry Burtnyk	5
Allan Lyburn	1
Dave Wallace	2
Allan Lyburn	10
Allan Lyburn	10
William Lyburn	4
Terry McNamee	5
William Lyburn	9

First Knockout	Qualifier 2
Scott Madams	7
James Kirkness	6
Scott Madams	7
Peter Nicholls	8
Peter Nicholls	7
Blair Goethals	5
Peter Nicholls	6
Vic Peters	8
Sam Antila	2
Vic Peters	9
Vic Peters	6
Kelly Robertson	4
Kelly Robertson	5
Murray Woodward	3

First Knockout	Qualifier 3
Arnold Asham	4
David Bohn	9
David Bohn	7
Mike McEwen	6
Mike McEwen	10
Russell Shackel	3
David Bohn	7
Reid Carruthers	5
Lionel Walz	4
Reid Carruthers	11
Reid Carruthers	10
Bob Sigurdson	7
Randy Neufeld	7
Bob Sigurdson	8

First Knockout	Qualifier 4
Daley Peters	9
Lorne Hamblin	6
Daley Peters	5
Jeff Stoughton	6
Jeff Stoughton	8
Glenn Parrott	3
Jeff Stoughton	7
Don Spriggs	5
Rae Hainstock	2
Don Spriggs	11
Don Spriggs	9
Chris Galbraith	3
Chris Galbraith	8
Richard Muntain	4

=== B Event ===
Second Knockout	Qualifier 5
William Lyburn	1
Kelly Skinner	7	Kelly Skinner	7	Allan Lyburn	8
Rob Fleming	4	Kelly Skinner	8	Kelly Skinner	5
Terry McNamee	7
Brendan Taylor	6
Dave Wallace	5	Terry McNamee	7
Terry McNamee	13

Second Knockout	Qualifier 6
Kelly Robertson	7
James Kirkness	11	James Kirkness	4	Peter Nicholls	6
Blair Goethals	9	Kelly Robertson	10	Kelly Robertson	3
Scott Madams	4
Scott Madams	7
Sam Antila	4	Murray Woodward	6
Murray Woodward	6

Second Knockout	Qualifier 7
Bob Sigurdson	8
Arnold Asham	8	Arnold Asham	5	Reid Carruthers	2
Russell Shackel	5	Bob Sigurdson	3	Mike McEwen	9
Mike McEwen	6
Mike McEwen	9
Lionel Walz	4	Randy Neufeld	6
Randy Neufeld	5

Second Knockout	Qualifier 8
Chris Galbraith	6
Lorne Hamblin	3	Glenn Parrott	4	Don Spriggs	11
Glenn Parrott	6	Chris Galbraith	6	Chris Galbraith	6
Rae Hainstock	3
Daley Peters	6
Rae Hainstock	8	Rae Hainstock	7
Richard Muntain	6

== Knockout Results ==
All draw times are listed in Central Standard Time (UTC−06:00).

=== Draw 1 ===
Wednesday, February 13, 8:30 am

Team	1	2	3	4	5	6	7	8	9	10	Final
Kelly Skinner	1	0	0	0	0	0	0	X	X	X	1
Brendan Taylor	0	2	0	1	2	0	1	X	X	X	6

Team	1	2	3	4	5	6	7	8	9	10	Final
Kerry Burtnyk	2	1	2	0	1	0	2	0	X	X	8
Rob Fleming	0	0	0	2	0	1	0	1	X	X	4

Team	1	2	3	4	5	6	7	8	9	10	Final
Dave Wallace	0	1	0	1	0	X	X	X	X	X	2
Allan Lyburn	3	0	3	0	4	X	X	X	X	X	10

Team	1	2	3	4	5	6	7	8	9	10	Final
Terry McNamee	0	2	1	1	0	0	1	0	0	X	5
William Lyburn	2	0	0	0	2	1	0	3	1	X	9

Team	1	2	3	4	5	6	7	8	9	10	Final
Scott Madams	1	1	0	1	0	1	1	0	0	2	7
James Kirkness	0	0	1	0	2	0	0	2	1	0	6

=== Draw 2 ===
Wednesday, February 13, 12:15 pm

Team	1	2	3	4	5	6	7	8	9	10	Final
Peter Nicholls	1	0	0	1	0	2	0	0	2	1	7
Blair Goethals	0	1	1	0	2	0	0	1	0	0	5

Team	1	2	3	4	5	6	7	8	9	10	Final
Sam Antila	0	0	0	1	0	1	0	0	X	X	2
Vic Peters	2	1	1	0	1	0	2	2	X	X	9

Team	1	2	3	4	5	6	7	8	9	10	Final
Kelly Robertson	3	0	0	0	0	0	1	1	0	X	5
Murray Woodward	0	0	0	1	1	0	0	0	1	X	3

Team	1	2	3	4	5	6	7	8	9	10	Final
Arnold Asham	0	1	0	0	2	0	1	0	0	X	4
David Bohn	2	0	0	2	0	2	0	1	2	X	9

Team	1	2	3	4	5	6	7	8	9	10	Final
Mike McEwen	0	2	0	0	1	0	3	4	X	X	10
Russell Shackel	0	0	1	0	0	2	0	0	X	X	3

=== Draw 3 ===
Wednesday, February 13, 4:00 pm

Team	1	2	3	4	5	6	7	8	9	10	Final
Lionel Walz	0	1	0	1	0	2	0	0	X	X	4
Reid Carruthers	3	0	4	0	1	0	2	1	X	X	11

Team	1	2	3	4	5	6	7	8	9	10	11	Final
Randy Neufeld	1	0	2	0	0	1	0	2	1	0	0	7
Bob Sigurdson	0	2	0	0	1	0	3	0	0	1	1	8

Team	1	2	3	4	5	6	7	8	9	10	Final
Daley Peters	0	0	1	2	0	0	0	5	1	X	9
Lorne Hamblin	0	1	0	0	2	2	1	0	0	X	6

Team	1	2	3	4	5	6	7	8	9	10	Final
Jeff Stoughton	1	0	1	0	4	2	0	X	X	X	8
Glenn Parrott	0	1	0	1	0	0	1	X	X	X	3

Team	1	2	3	4	5	6	7	8	9	10	Final
Rae Hainstock	1	0	0	0	1	0	0	X	X	X	2
Don Spriggs	0	3	0	1	0	0	7	X	X	X	11

=== Draw 4 ===
Wednesday, February 13, 8:15 pm

Team	1	2	3	4	5	6	7	8	9	10	Final
Chris Galbraith	0	2	1	0	3	0	0	1	0	1	8
Richard Muntain	0	0	0	1	0	1	1	0	1	0	4

Team	1	2	3	4	5	6	7	8	9	10	Final
Kelly Skinner	2	0	0	2	0	0	0	3	0	X	7
Rob Fleming	0	0	1	0	1	1	1	0	0	X	4

Team	1	2	3	4	5	6	7	8	9	10	Final
Dave Wallace	0	1	0	2	0	0	2	0	0	X	5
Terry McNamee	2	0	1	0	1	2	0	2	5	X	13

Team	1	2	3	4	5	6	7	8	9	10	11	Final
James Kirkness	0	2	2	0	3	0	2	0	0	0	2	11
Blair Goethals	1	0	0	2	0	1	0	3	1	1	0	9

Team	1	2	3	4	5	6	7	8	9	10	Final
Sam Antila	2	0	0	0	1	0	0	1	X	X	4
Murray Woodward	0	2	0	1	0	2	1	0	X	X	6

=== Draw 5 ===
Thursday, February 14, 8:30 am

Team	1	2	3	4	5	6	7	8	9	10	Final
Vic Peters	1	1	2	0	0	1	0	0	1	X	6
Kelly Robertson	0	0	0	1	1	0	1	1	0	X	4

Team	1	2	3	4	5	6	7	8	9	10	11	Final
David Bohn	0	0	0	2	0	2	0	0	2	0	1	7
Mike McEwen	0	1	1	0	1	0	0	2	0	1	0	6

Team	1	2	3	4	5	6	7	8	9	10	Final
Reid Carruthers	2	0	3	0	2	0	2	0	1	X	10
Bob Sigurdson	0	2	0	2	0	2	0	1	0	X	7

Team	1	2	3	4	5	6	7	8	9	10	Final
Arnold Asham	0	2	0	3	0	1	0	1	0	1	8
Russell Shackel	1	0	1	0	1	0	1	0	1	0	5

Team	1	2	3	4	5	6	7	8	9	10	Final
Lionel Walz	0	0	0	0	0	2	0	1	0	1	4
Randy Neufeld	1	0	0	1	0	0	2	0	1	0	5

=== Draw 6 ===
Thursday, February 14, 12:15 pm

Team	1	2	3	4	5	6	7	8	9	10	Final
Brendan Taylor	1	1	1	0	0	0	2	0	1	0	6
Kerry Burtnyk	0	0	0	1	2	0	0	2	0	3	8

Team	1	2	3	4	5	6	7	8	9	10	Final
Allan Lyburn	0	1	0	4	1	0	3	1	X	X	10
William Lyburn	3	0	1	0	0	0	0	0	X	X	4

Team	1	2	3	4	5	6	7	8	9	10	Final
Scott Madams	2	0	0	0	3	0	0	0	2	X	7
Peter Nicholls	0	0	1	0	0	2	2	3	0	X	8

Team	1	2	3	4	5	6	7	8	9	10	Final
Daley Peters	0	1	0	1	0	2	1	0	0	X	5
Jeff Stoughton	1	0	1	0	2	0	0	2	0	X	6

Team	1	2	3	4	5	6	7	8	9	10	Final
Don Spriggs	0	1	0	2	3	0	3	X	X	X	9
Chris Galbraith	1	0	1	0	0	1	0	X	X	X	3

=== Draw 7 ===
Thursday, February 14, 4:00 pm

Team	1	2	3	4	5	6	7	8	9	10	Final
Lorne Hamblin	0	0	2	0	0	1	0	0	0	X	3
Glenn Parrott	0	0	0	0	2	0	1	2	1	X	6

Team	1	2	3	4	5	6	7	8	9	10	Final
Rae Hainstock	0	0	2	3	0	0	0	2	0	1	8
Richard Muntain	0	2	0	0	2	0	1	0	1	0	6

Team	1	2	3	4	5	6	7	8	9	10	Final
James Kirkness	1	1	0	0	0	0	0	0	2	0	4
Kelly Robertson	0	0	1	1	0	0	1	3	0	1	7

Team	1	2	3	4	5	6	7	8	9	10	Final
Arnold Asham	0	1	0	1	0	0	1	0	2	0	5
Bob Sigurdson	0	0	1	0	3	1	0	1	0	2	8

Team	1	2	3	4	5	6	7	8	9	10	Final
Randy Neufeld	0	0	2	0	1	0	2	0	1	0	6
Mike McEwen	0	1	0	1	0	1	0	2	0	4	9

=== Draw 8 ===
Thursday, February 14, 7:45 pm

Team	1	2	3	4	5	6	7	8	9	10	Final
Kelly Skinner	1	0	1	2	2	1	X	X	X	X	7
William Lyburn	0	1	0	0	0	0	X	X	X	X	1

Team	1	2	3	4	5	6	7	8	9	10	Final
Terry McNamee	0	0	2	1	0	1	0	2	0	1	7
Brendan Taylor	0	2	0	0	1	0	2	0	1	0	6

Team	1	2	3	4	5	6	7	8	9	10	Final
Murray Woodward	0	1	0	1	1	0	1	0	2	0	6
Scott Madams	1	0	1	0	0	1	0	3	0	1	7

Team	1	2	3	4	5	6	7	8	9	10	Final
Glenn Parrott	0	0	0	0	1	1	0	2	0	X	4
Chris Galbraith	1	0	0	3	0	0	1	0	1	X	6

Team	1	2	3	4	5	6	7	8	9	10	Final
Rae Hainstock	2	0	0	1	0	0	1	1	0	2	7
Daley Peters	0	2	1	0	2	0	0	0	1	0	6

=== Draw 9 ===
Friday, February 15, 8:30 am

Team	1	2	3	4	5	6	7	8	9	10	Final
Kerry Burtnyk	2	0	1	2	0	0	0	0	X	X	5
Allan Lyburn	0	0	0	0	0	0	0	1	X	X	1

Team	1	2	3	4	5	6	7	8	9	10	Final
Peter Nicholls	1	0	2	0	0	0	2	0	1	X	6
Vic Peters	0	1	0	0	3	1	0	3	0	X	8

Team	1	2	3	4	5	6	7	8	9	10	Final
David Bohn	1	1	0	0	0	2	1	1	0	1	7
Reid Carruthers	0	0	1	1	1	0	0	0	2	0	5

Team	1	2	3	4	5	6	7	8	9	10	Final
Jeff Stoughton	0	0	2	0	1	0	1	0	3	X	7
Don Spriggs	1	0	0	1	0	2	0	1	0	X	5

=== Draw 10 ===
Friday, February 15, 12:15 pm

Team	1	2	3	4	5	6	7	8	9	10	Final
Kelly Skinner	2	0	0	1	0	3	0	1	0	1	8
Terry McNamee	0	2	0	0	2	0	2	0	1	0	7

Team	1	2	3	4	5	6	7	8	9	10	Final
Kelly Robertson	1	1	1	1	0	3	0	0	3	X	10
Scott Madams	0	0	0	0	2	0	1	1	0	X	4

Team	1	2	3	4	5	6	7	8	9	10	Final
Bob Sigurdson	0	0	0	1	0	0	2	0	0	X	3
Mike McEwen	0	1	1	0	2	0	0	2	0	X	6

Team	1	2	3	4	5	6	7	8	9	10	Final
Chris Galbraith	0	1	0	0	0	2	2	0	1	X	6
Rae Hainstock	1	0	0	0	1	0	0	1	0	X	3

=== Draw 11 ===
Friday, February 15, 4:00 pm

Team	1	2	3	4	5	6	7	8	9	10	Final
Kelly Skinner	1	0	0	2	1	0	1	0	0	X	5
Allan Lyburn	0	2	1	0	0	1	0	3	1	X	8

Team	1	2	3	4	5	6	7	8	9	10	Final
Kelly Robertson	0	0	0	0	1	0	1	0	1	X	3
Peter Nicholls	1	0	1	1	0	2	0	1	0	X	6

Team	1	2	3	4	5	6	7	8	9	10	Final
Mike McEwen	3	0	3	1	2	X	X	X	X	X	9
Reid Carruthers	0	2	0	0	0	X	X	X	X	X	2

Team	1	2	3	4	5	6	7	8	9	10	Final
Chris Galbraith	3	0	0	0	0	2	0	1	0	X	6
Don Spriggs	0	1	1	1	1	0	4	0	3	X	11

== Playoff Brackets ==
8 team double knockout
Four teams qualify into Championship round

=== A event ===
First Knockout
Q1	Kerry Burtnyk	8
Q6	Peter Nicholls	4
Q2	Vic Peters	4
Q5	Allan Lyburn	7

Qualifier 1
Q1	Kerry Burtnyk	8
Q5	Allan Lyburn	1

First Knockout
Q3	David Bohn	9
Q8	Don Spriggs	6
Q4	Jeff Stoughton	8
Q7	Mike McEwen	2

Qualifier 2
Q3	David Bohn	9
Q4	Jeff Stoughton	4

=== B event ===
Second Knockout			Qualifier 3
			Q4	Jeff Stoughton	4
Q6	Peter Nicholls	4	Q2	Vic Peters	7
Q2	Vic Peters	9

Second Knockout			Qualifier 4
			Q5	Allan Lyburn	3
Q8	Don Spriggs	4	Q7	Mike McEwen	8
Q7	Mike McEwen	7

== Playoff Results ==
=== Draw 12 ===
Friday, February 15, 7:45 pm

Team	1	2	3	4	5	6	7	8	9	10	Final
Kerry Burtnyk	2	0	1	0	1	0	1	0	3	X	8
Peter Nicholls	0	1	0	0	0	2	0	1	0	X	4

Team	1	2	3	4	5	6	7	8	9	10	Final
Vic Peters	2	0	0	0	0	1	0	1	0	X	4
Allan Lyburn	0	3	0	0	0	0	1	0	3	X	7

Team	1	2	3	4	5	6	7	8	9	10	Final
David Bohn	1	0	0	0	2	0	3	0	3	X	9
Don Spriggs	0	2	1	0	0	1	0	2	0	X	6

Team	1	2	3	4	5	6	7	8	9	10	Final
Jeff Stoughton	0	2	0	2	2	0	2	X	X	X	8
Mike McEwen	0	0	1	0	0	1	0	X	X	X	2

=== Draw 13 ===
Saturday, February 16, 9:00 am

Team	1	2	3	4	5	6	7	8	9	10	Final
Kerry Burtnyk	3	3	2	0	0	X	X	X	X	X	8
Allan Lyburn	0	0	0	0	1	X	X	X	X	X	1

Team	1	2	3	4	5	6	7	8	9	10	Final
David Bohn	1	2	0	2	1	0	0	3	X	X	9
Jeff Stoughton	0	0	1	0	0	1	2	0	X	X	4

Team	1	2	3	4	5	6	7	8	9	10	Final
Peter Nicholls	0	1	1	0	0	1	0	1	0	X	4
Vic Peters	1	0	0	2	4	0	1	0	1	X	9

Team	1	2	3	4	5	6	7	8	9	10	Final
Don Spriggs	0	1	0	0	0	1	0	0	2	0	4
Mike McEwen	1	0	1	0	0	0	4	0	0	1	7

=== Draw 14 ===
Saturday February 16, 2:00 pm

Team	1	2	3	4	5	6	7	8	9	10	Final
Jeff Stoughton	0	1	0	0	1	0	1	0	1	X	4
Vic Peters	1	0	2	2	0	1	0	1	0	X	7

Team	1	2	3	4	5	6	7	8	9	10	Final
Allan Lyburn	1	0	0	1	0	0	1	0	X	X	3
Mike McEwen	0	2	3	0	1	0	0	2	X	X	8

== Championship Round ==
Page playoff system
1	Kerry Burtnyk	5
2	David Bohn	8
3	Vic Peters	3
4	Mike McEwen	5

Semifinal
1	Kerry Burtnyk	7
4	Mike McEwen	5

Final
2	David Bohn	5
1	Kerry Burtnyk	11

=== 1 vs. 2 ===
Saturday, February 16, 7:00 pm

Team	1	2	3	4	5	6	7	8	9	10	Final
Kerry Burtnyk	2	0	1	0	0	1	0	1	0	0	5
David Bohn	0	1	0	0	1	0	3	0	2	1	8

=== 3 vs. 4 ===
Saturday, February 16, 7:00 pm

Team	1	2	3	4	5	6	7	8	9	10	Final
Vic Peters	0	0	1	0	1	0	0	0	1	0	3
Mike McEwen	0	0	0	1	0	1	1	0	0	2	5

=== Semifinal ===
Sunday, February 17, 9:30 am

Team	1	2	3	4	5	6	7	8	9	10	11	Final
Kerry Burtnyk	0	2	0	0	0	1	0	2	0	0	2	7
Mike McEwen	1	0	1	0	0	0	1	0	0	2	0	5

=== Final ===
Sunday, February 17, 2:00 pm

Team	1	2	3	4	5	6	7	8	9	10	Final
David Bohn	0	1	0	0	1	1	0	2	0	X	5
Kerry Burtnyk	4	0	2	1	0	0	2	0	2	X	11

2008 Safeway Championship

Kerry Burtnyk
5th Manitoba Provincial Championship title

== Awards ==
2008 Safeway Championship All-Stars
Position	Player	Team	Club
Skip	David Bohn	Team Bohn	Assiniboine Memorial CC
Third	Dan Kammerlock	Team Burtnyk	Assiniboine Memorial CC
Second	Richard Daneault	Team Burtnyk	Assiniboine Memorial CC
Lead	Keith Fenton	Team Vic Peters	Fort Garry CC
