= Dave Nantes =

Canadian curler

David (Dave) D. N. "Dubby" Nantes (born August 30, 1970) is a Canadian curler.

Nantes played third for Dean Joanisse at the 1989 Canadian Junior Curling Championships, which they won. Nantes would later re-join with Joanisse at second position and Nantes would win his first provincial men's championship in 2007. At the 2007 Tim Hortons Brier, they finished out of the playoffs with a 4-7 record. Nantes left the team when it split up in 2008.

Born in Victoria, British Columbia, Canada, Nantes is a merchandiser for North Douglas Sysco.
