= Mike Wood (curler) =

Canadian curler

Michael Wood
- Curler
- Born: September 4, 1968 (age 58); Victoria, British Columbia

Team
- Curling club: Victoria CC, Victoria, BC
- Skip: Neil Dangerfield
- Third: Mike Wood
- Second: Darren Boden
- Lead: Glen Allen
- Alternate: Andy Jarzebiak

Curling career
- Member Association: British Columbia
- Brier: 1 (2007)
- Other appearances: CJCC: 1 (1988); CSCC: 1 (2024)
Medal record
Men's Curling
Representing Canada
World Junior Curling Championships
Silver medal – second place	1989 Markham

Michael Wood (born September 4, 1968) is a Canadian curler.

Wood skipped his team of Mike Bradley, Todd Troyer and Greg Hawkes to the 1988 Canadian Junior Curling Championships title, defeating Northern Ontario's Craig Kochan in the final. In 1989, this team lost the final at the World Junior Curling Championships to Sweden, skipped by Peja Lindholm.

Nearly two decades later, Wood joined 1990 World Junior Champion Dean Joanisse, and they won the British Columbia provincial championships in 2007. In 2008, Wood left the Joanisse rink.

Wood is a grounds foreman for Oak Bay Parks.
