= 1988 Canadian Junior Curling Championships =

The 1988 Pepsi Canadian Junior Curling Championships were held March 26 to April 2, 1988 at the North Shore Winter Club in North Vancouver, British Columbia.

== Men's ==
=== Teams ===
Province / Territory	Skip	Third	Second	Lead
Prince Edward Island	James McCarthy	Daryell Nowlan	Paul Power	Ian Power
Saskatchewan	Randy Bryden	Dean Klippenstine	Craig Fiske	Rick Stack
Manitoba	Brent Braemer	Kyle Thompsett	Myles Riddell	Garth Smith
Yukon/Northwest Territories	Chad Cowan	Jeff MacPheat	Doug Bryant	Kevin Johnstone
Alberta	Michael Sali	Graham Vermette	Kevin Faichuk	Joel Matthews
Ontario	Daryl Morrell	Scott Lane	Gord Johnston	Chris Lane
Quebec	Francois Collin	Yves Allard	Guy Simard	Marc Tremblay
Nova Scotia	Mike Pace	Paul Pace	Doug Mackenzie	Keith Taylor
New Brunswick	Tim Comeau	Brad Fitzherbert	Lloyd Morrison	Scott Archibald
Northern Ontario	Craig Kochan	Mike Desilets	Andy Davis	Craig Cordiner
Newfoundland	Craig Piercey	Craig Dowden	Paul Carter	Troy Loder
British Columbia	Mike Wood	Mike Bradley	Todd Troyer	Greg Hawkes

=== Standings ===
Locale	Skip	W	L
Northern Ontario	Craig Kochan	9	2
Saskatchewan	Randy Bryden	8	3
Nova Scotia	Mike Pace	7	4
British Columbia	Mike Wood	7	4
Newfoundland	Craig Piercey	7	4
Manitoba	Brent Braemer	7	4
New Brunswick	Tim Comeau	6	5
Ontario	Daryl Morrell	4	7
Alberta	Michael Sali	4	7
Prince Edward Island	James McCarthy	3	8
Yukon/Northwest Territories	Chad Cowan	3	8
Quebec	Francois Collin	1	10

=== Results ===
==== Draw 1 ====
Sheet A	1	2	3	4	5	6	7	8	9	10	Final
Newfoundland (Piercey)	0	0	0	0	0	1	0	X	X	X	1
British Columbia (Wood)	1	0	0	1	2	0	4	X	X	X	8

Sheet B	1	2	3	4	5	6	7	8	9	10	Final
New Brunswick (Comeau)	2	1	0	1	0	2	0	0	1	X	7
Alberta (Sali)	0	0	1	0	2	0	1	1	0	X	5

Sheet C	1	2	3	4	5	6	7	8	9	10	Final
Prince Edward Island (McCarthy)	0	0	1	2	0	1	2	0	2	X	8
Quebec (Collin)	0	0	0	0	2	0	0	1	0	X	3

Sheet E	1	2	3	4	5	6	7	8	9	10	Final
Manitoba (Braemer)	2	1	0	1	0	0	2	0	0	X	6
Ontario (Morrell)	0	0	1	0	2	0	0	1	0	X	4

Sheet G	1	2	3	4	5	6	7	8	9	10	Final
Saskatchewan (Bryden)	0	1	0	3	0	0	0	0	2	1	7
Northern Ontario (Kochan)	1	0	2	0	2	0	0	1	0	0	6

Sheet H	1	2	3	4	5	6	7	8	9	10	Final
Yukon/Northwest Territories (Cowan)	0	0	0	0	1	0	0	X	X	X	1
Nova Scotia (Pace)	0	0	1	5	0	2	2	X	X	X	10

==== Draw 2 ====
Sheet A	1	2	3	4	5	6	7	8	9	10	Final
Quebec (Collin)	1	0	1	0	1	0	2	0	3	0	8
Saskatchewan (Bryden)	0	1	0	1	0	3	0	2	0	2	9

Sheet B	1	2	3	4	5	6	7	8	9	10	Final
British Columbia (Wood)	2	0	0	3	0	1	0	2	X	X	8
Yukon/Northwest Territories (Cowan)	0	0	2	0	1	0	1	0	X	X	4

Sheet C	1	2	3	4	5	6	7	8	9	10	Final
Northern Ontario (Kochan)	0	0	1	3	0	0	0	2	1	X	7
Newfoundland (Piercey)	1	1	0	0	1	1	1	0	0	X	5

Sheet D	1	2	3	4	5	6	7	8	9	10	Final
Manitoba (Braemer)	2	1	0	0	1	2	2	X	X	X	8
Nova Scotia (Pace)	0	0	1	0	0	0	0	X	X	X	1

==== Draw 3 ====
Sheet E	1	2	3	4	5	6	7	8	9	10	Final
British Columbia (Wood)	1	0	0	0	1	0	1	0	0	X	3
Northern Ontario (Kochan)	0	0	1	1	0	1	0	1	1	X	5

Sheet F	1	2	3	4	5	6	7	8	9	10	Final
Newfoundland (Piercey)	1	1	0	2	1	0	1	3	0	0	9
Saskatchewan (Bryden)	0	0	4	0	0	1	0	0	2	1	8

Sheet G	1	2	3	4	5	6	7	8	9	10	Final
Alberta (Sali)	2	0	0	0	2	0	1	0	0	1	6
Prince Edward Island (McCarthy)	0	1	0	1	0	1	0	1	0	0	4

Sheet H	1	2	3	4	5	6	7	8	9	10	Final
Ontario (Morrell)	1	0	0	0	1	1	1	0	2	0	6
New Brunswick (Comeau)	0	2	0	1	0	0	0	2	0	2	7

==== Draw 4 ====
Sheet A	1	2	3	4	5	6	7	8	9	10	Final
New Brunswick (Comeau)	1	0	0	1	1	1	0	0	X	X	4
Manitoba (Braemer)	0	1	0	0	0	0	1	1	X	X	3

Sheet B	1	2	3	4	5	6	7	8	9	10	Final
Nova Scotia (Pace)	0	1	3	0	0	4	X	X	X	X	8
Prince Edward Island (McCarthy)	0	0	0	1	0	0	X	X	X	X	1

Sheet C	1	2	3	4	5	6	7	8	9	10	Final
Alberta (Sali)	1	0	0	1	1	0	1	4	X	X	8
Quebec (Collin)	0	0	1	0	0	1	0	0	X	X	2

Sheet D	1	2	3	4	5	6	7	8	9	10	Final
Ontario (Morrell)	0	0	2	1	0	1	0	0	2	X	6
Yukon/Northwest Territories (Cowan)	1	0	0	0	1	0	2	0	0	X	4

==== Draw 5 ====
Sheet E	1	2	3	4	5	6	7	8	9	10	Final
Saskatchewan (Bryden)	1	0	0	2	1	0	0	3	X	X	7
British Columbia (Wood)	0	0	1	0	0	1	0	0	X	X	2

Sheet F	1	2	3	4	5	6	7	8	9	10	Final
Ontario (Morrell)	2	0	1	0	1	0	0	0	0	X	4
Nova Scotia (Pace)	0	0	0	3	0	3	1	1	3	X	11

Sheet G	1	2	3	4	5	6	7	8	9	10	Final
Prince Edward Island (McCarthy)	1	1	0	0	2	0	0	2	0	3	9
New Brunswick (Comeau)	0	0	4	0	0	1	0	0	2	0	7

Sheet H	1	2	3	4	5	6	7	8	9	10	Final
Newfoundland (Piercey)	2	2	0	2	0	1	X	X	X	X	7
Alberta (Sali)	0	0	1	0	0	0	X	X	X	X	1

==== Draw 6 ====
Sheet A	1	2	3	4	5	6	7	8	9	10	Final
Alberta (Sali)	1	0	0	0	1	0	2	1	0	X	5
Ontario (Morrell)	0	3	0	2	0	1	0	0	1	X	7

Sheet B	1	2	3	4	5	6	7	8	9	10	Final
Manitoba (Braemer)	0	1	3	0	0	1	0	0	2	1	8
Yukon/Northwest Territories (Cowan)	1	0	0	1	2	0	0	2	0	0	6

Sheet C	1	2	3	4	5	6	7	8	9	10	Final
Newfoundland (Piercey)	2	0	1	0	0	2	0	1	0	1	7
New Brunswick (Comeau)	0	0	0	2	1	0	1	0	1	0	5

Sheet D	1	2	3	4	5	6	7	8	9	10	Final
Quebec (Collin)	0	0	0	0	0	1	0	X	X	X	1
Northern Ontario (Kochan)	1	0	1	2	3	0	3	X	X	X	10

==== Draw 7 ====
Sheet E	1	2	3	4	5	6	7	8	9	10	Final
Yukon/Northwest Territories (Cowan)	2	0	1	0	0	4	0	1	0	X	8
Quebec (Collin)	0	1	0	2	1	0	1	0	0	X	5

Sheet F	1	2	3	4	5	6	7	8	9	10	11	12	Final
Saskatchewan (Bryden)	1	0	0	0	0	0	2	1	0	1	0	0	5
Manitoba (Braemer)	0	0	2	1	1	0	0	0	1	0	0	1	6

Sheet G	1	2	3	4	5	6	7	8	9	10	Final
Nova Scotia (Pace)	2	0	2	0	0	2	2	0	1	X	9
British Columbia (Wood)	0	3	0	1	1	0	0	0	0	X	5

Sheet H	1	2	3	4	5	6	7	8	9	10	Final
Northern Ontario (Kochan)	1	1	0	0	0	0	1	0	0	2	5
Prince Edward Island (McCarthy)	0	0	0	1	1	1	0	1	0	0	4

==== Draw 8 ====
Sheet A	1	2	3	4	5	6	7	8	9	10	Final
Yukon/Northwest Territories (Cowan)	0	1	0	0	0	1	0	1	0	X	3
Prince Edward Island (McCarthy)	0	0	0	2	0	0	2	0	2	X	6

Sheet B	1	2	3	4	5	6	7	8	9	10	Final
Saskatchewan (Bryden)	1	2	0	4	0	0	1	0	X	X	8
Ontario (Morrell)	0	0	1	0	1	0	0	1	X	X	3

Sheet C	1	2	3	4	5	6	7	8	9	10	Final
Manitoba (Braemer)	3	0	1	4	0	X	X	X	X	X	8
Northern Ontario (Kochan)	0	1	0	0	1	X	X	X	X	X	2

Sheet D	1	2	3	4	5	6	7	8	9	10	Final
New Brunswick (Comeau)	1	1	0	1	0	0	2	0	3	X	8
Quebec (Collin)	0	0	3	0	0	0	0	1	0	X	4

==== Draw 9 ====
Sheet E	1	2	3	4	5	6	7	8	9	10	Final
Prince Edward Island (McCarthy)	1	1	0	0	2	0	1	1	0	0	6
Saskatchewan (Bryden)	0	0	3	1	0	2	0	0	0	2	8

Sheet F	1	2	3	4	5	6	7	8	9	10	Final
British Columbia (Wood)	0	0	0	0	1	0	3	1	1	X	6
Alberta (Sali)	0	0	1	2	0	1	0	0	0	X	4

Sheet G	1	2	3	4	5	6	7	8	9	10	Final
Yukon/Northwest Territories (Cowan)	1	0	1	0	0	0	0	2	0	0	4
Newfoundland (Piercey)	0	2	0	1	0	0	1	0	1	1	6

Sheet H	1	2	3	4	5	6	7	8	9	10	Final
Quebec (Collin)	0	1	0	0	0	2	0	4	0	0	7
Nova Scotia (Pace)	1	0	0	1	1	0	2	0	2	1	8

==== Draw 10 ====
Sheet A	1	2	3	4	5	6	7	8	9	10	Final
Nova Scotia (Pace)	2	0	2	0	1	0	0	1	0	1	7
Newfoundland (Piercey)	0	2	0	1	0	1	1	0	1	0	6

Sheet B	1	2	3	4	5	6	7	8	9	10	Final
Alberta (Sali)	0	1	0	1	0	0	0	3	1	0	6
Manitoba (Braemer)	1	0	1	0	1	0	1	0	0	1	5

Sheet C	1	2	3	4	5	6	7	8	9	10	Final
New Brunswick (Comeau)	0	1	2	0	0	1	0	0	1	X	5
British Columbia (Wood)	0	0	0	1	0	0	1	0	0	X	2

Sheet D	1	2	3	4	5	6	7	8	9	10	Final
Northern Ontario (Kochan)	0	0	0	0	1	0	1	0	0	0	2
Ontario (Morrell)	0	0	0	0	0	0	0	0	1	0	1

==== Draw 11 ====
Sheet E	1	2	3	4	5	6	7	8	9	10	11	Final
Nova Scotia (Pace)	2	0	1	0	0	0	2	0	1	0	0	6
New Brunswick (Comeau)	0	2	0	1	0	0	0	2	0	1	1	7

Sheet F	1	2	3	4	5	6	7	8	9	10	Final
Newfoundland (Piercey)	2	0	2	0	3	0	0	2	0	X	9
Prince Edward Island (McCarthy)	0	4	0	2	0	0	1	0	1	X	8

Sheet G	1	2	3	4	5	6	7	8	9	10	Final
Northern Ontario (Kochan)	1	2	0	2	0	0	1	0	0	1	7
Alberta (Sali)	0	0	1	0	1	0	0	1	1	0	4

Sheet H	1	2	3	4	5	6	7	8	9	10	Final
British Columbia (Wood)	1	3	2	0	0	1	X	X	X	X	7
Manitoba (Braemer)	0	0	0	1	0	0	X	X	X	X	1

==== Draw 12 ====
Sheet A	1	2	3	4	5	6	7	8	9	10	Final
Manitoba (Braemer)	2	1	0	0	0	1	0	0	1	X	5
Quebec (Collin)	0	0	2	0	0	0	1	0	0	X	3

Sheet B	1	2	3	4	5	6	7	8	9	10	Final
Northern Ontario (Kochan)	2	0	1	0	0	2	0	1	0	X	6
Nova Scotia (Pace)	0	0	0	0	2	0	1	0	1	X	4

Sheet C	1	2	3	4	5	6	7	8	9	10	Final
Ontario (Morrell)	0	0	1	0	3	4	X	X	X	X	8
Prince Edward Island (McCarthy)	0	0	0	2	0	0	X	X	X	X	2

Sheet D	1	2	3	4	5	6	7	8	9	10	Final
Saskatchewan (Bryden)	0	1	1	0	0	0	1	0	0	X	3
Yukon/Northwest Territories (MacPheat)	0	0	0	1	1	0	0	2	1	X	5

==== Draw 13 ====
Sheet E	1	2	3	4	5	6	7	8	9	10	Final
Quebec (Collin)	0	1	0	0	1	0	0	1	0	X	3
Newfoundland (Piercey)	0	0	1	2	0	0	2	0	2	X	7

Sheet F	1	2	3	4	5	6	7	8	9	10	Final
Yukon/Northwest Territories (MacPheat)	1	0	0	1	0	1	0	1	0	1	5
New Brunswick (Comeau)	0	0	1	0	2	0	1	0	0	0	4

Sheet G	1	2	3	4	5	6	7	8	9	10	Final
Ontario (Morrell)	0	0	1	0	2	0	0	1	0	X	4
British Columbia (Wood)	0	0	0	1	0	3	1	0	1	X	6

Sheet H	1	2	3	4	5	6	7	8	9	10	Final
Saskatchewan (Bryden)	2	0	2	0	0	2	0	0	0	3	9
Alberta (Sali)	0	1	0	2	1	0	2	1	0	0	7

==== Draw 14 ====
Sheet A	1	2	3	4	5	6	7	8	9	10	11	Final
Prince Edward Island (McCarthy)	3	0	0	0	2	0	1	0	0	1	0	7
British Columbia (Wood)	0	0	3	1	0	1	0	2	0	0	1	8

Sheet B	1	2	3	4	5	6	7	8	9	10	Final
Quebec (Collin)	1	0	0	0	2	0	0	0	1	1	5
Ontario (Morrell)	0	0	1	1	0	0	1	1	0	0	4

Sheet C	1	2	3	4	5	6	7	8	9	10	Final
Alberta (Sali)	2	1	0	1	0	2	0	2	0	X	8
Yukon/Northwest Territories (MacPheat)	0	0	2	0	1	0	1	0	2	X	6

Sheet D	1	2	3	4	5	6	7	8	9	10	Final
New Brunswick (Comeau)	0	1	0	1	0	1	0	1	X	X	4
Saskatchewan (Bryden)	2	0	1	0	3	0	1	0	X	X	7

==== Draw 15 ====
Sheet E	1	2	3	4	5	6	7	8	9	10	Final
Alberta (Sali)	0	1	0	0	0	1	X	X	X	X	2
Nova Scotia (Pace)	1	0	3	2	1	0	X	X	X	X	7

Sheet F	1	2	3	4	5	6	7	8	9	10	Final
British Columbia (Wood)	2	1	0	1	0	3	0	1	3	X	11
Quebec (Collin)	0	0	1	0	0	0	2	0	0	X	3

Sheet G	1	2	3	4	5	6	7	8	9	10	Final
Manitoba (Braemer)	2	0	0	0	1	0	0	0	2	1	6
Newfoundland (Piercey)	0	1	0	3	0	1	2	0	0	0	7

Sheet H	1	2	3	4	5	6	7	8	9	10	Final
New Brunswick (Comeau)	2	0	0	0	0	1	1	0	2	X	6
Northern Ontario (Kochan)	0	0	2	1	3	0	0	1	0	X	7

==== Draw 16 ====
Sheet A	1	2	3	4	5	6	7	8	9	10	Final
Northern Ontario (Kochan)	4	0	0	0	0	3	1	X	X	X	8
Yukon/Northwest Territories (MacPheat)	0	1	0	1	0	0	0	X	X	X	2

Sheet B	1	2	3	4	5	6	7	8	9	10	Final
Newfoundland (Piercey)	2	0	0	0	1	0	1	0	2	0	6
Ontario (Morrell)	0	1	2	3	0	1	0	1	0	1	9

Sheet C	1	2	3	4	5	6	7	8	9	10	Final
Nova Scotia (Pace)	1	0	0	0	1	0	0	0	1	X	3
Saskatchewan (Bryden)	0	0	1	0	0	0	2	2	0	X	5

Sheet D	1	2	3	4	5	6	7	8	9	10	Final
Prince Edward Island (McCarthy)	0	1	0	1	0	1	0	0	1	X	4
Manitoba (Braemer)	2	0	1	0	2	0	0	2	0	X	7

=== Tiebreakers ===
==== Tiebreaker #1 ====
Sheet C	1	2	3	4	5	6	7	8	9	10	11	Final
Newfoundland (Piercey)	1	0	1	0	1	0	0	0	0	1	0	4
Nova Scotia (Pace)	0	1	0	1	0	0	1	1	0	0	1	5

Player percentages
Newfoundland		Nova Scotia	
Troy Loder	78%	Keith Taylor	83%
Paul Carter	66%	Doug Mackenzie	61%
Craig Dowden	66%	Paul Pace	70%
Craig Piercey	61%	Mike Pace	61%
Total	68%	Total	69%

Sheet E	1	2	3	4	5	6	7	8	9	10	Final
British Columbia (Wood)	2	0	0	0	0	2	1	0	0	X	5
Manitoba (Braemer)	0	0	0	1	0	0	0	0	1	X	2

Player percentages
British Columbia		Manitoba	
Greg Hawkes	88%	Garth Smith	80%
Todd Troyer	71%	Myles Riddell	84%
Mike Bradley	74%	Kyle Thompsett	78%
Mike Wood	86%	Brent Braemer	65%
Total	79%	Total	77%

==== Tiebreaker #2 ====
Sheet D	1	2	3	4	5	6	7	8	9	10	Final
British Columbia (Wood)	2	0	0	0	0	0	2	0	0	X	4
Nova Scotia (Pace)	0	0	1	0	1	0	0	0	0	X	2

Player percentages
British Columbia		Nova Scotia	
Greg Hawkes	67%	Keith Taylor	93%
Todd Troyer	70%	Doug Mackenzie	79%
Mike Bradley	78%	Paul Pace	68%
Mike Wood	66%	Mike Pace	59%
Total	70%	Total	75%

=== Playoffs ===
Semifinal		Final
Saskatchewan	2
British Columbia	5	Northern Ontario	2
		British Columbia	6

==== Semifinal ====
Sheet E	1	2	3	4	5	6	7	8	9	10	Final
Saskatchewan (Bryden)	1	0	0	0	0	0	0	0	1	X	2
British Columbia (Wood)	0	0	2	0	1	0	1	1	0	X	5

Player percentages
Saskatchewan		British Columbia	
Rick Stack	76%	Greg Hawkes	78%
Craig Fiske	76%	Todd Troyer	80%
Dean Klippenstine	59%	Mike Bradley	76%
Randy Bryden	68%	Mike Wood	86%
Total	70%	Total	80%

==== Final ====
Sheet D	1	2	3	4	5	6	7	8	9	10	Final
Northern Ontario (Kochan)	0	2	0	0	0	0	0	0	0	X	2
British Columbia (Wood)	1	0	2	0	0	1	1	0	1	X	6

Player percentages
Northern Ontario		British Columbia	
Craig Cordiner	89%	Greg Hawkes	75%
Andy Davis	80%	Todd Troyer	75%
Mike Desilets	53%	Mike Bradley	75%
Craig Kochan	69%	Mike Wood	86%
Total	73%	Total	78%

== Women's ==
=== Teams ===
Province / Territory	Skip	Third	Second	Lead
Manitoba	Jennifer Lamont	Margaret Morlock	Janine Sigurdson	Suzanne Pearson
New Brunswick	Cathy McEwen	Lori Murphy	Shelly Danks	Tracey Bennett
Yukon/Northwest Territories	Michele Cowan	Dawn Moses	Shea MacKenzie	Dawn Nolan
Quebec	Mona Maziade	Isabelle Gagnon	Manon Maziade	Karen Speagle
Newfoundland	Carla Brett	Tracey Barker	Kimberley Cole	Heather Young
British Columbia	Colleen Hannah	Melissa Soligo	Lori Atkins	Tracy Butt
Alberta	LaDawn Funk	Sandy Symyrozum	Cindy Larsen	Laurelle Funk
Saskatchewan	Bonnie McLelland	Susan Folstad	Sherry Yasinski	Tanis Boschman
Nova Scotia	Tracy Dobson	Angeliene Romkey	Shelley Heisler	Carla Shearer
Prince Edward Island	Angela Roberts	Cathy Ann Campbell	Anne Dillon	Gail MacNeil
Ontario	Nadine Landon	Ann Wardell	Lisa Showan	Cindy Senecal

=== Standings ===
Locale	Skip	W	L
Manitoba	Jennifer Lamont	8	2
Alberta	LaDawn Funk	7	3
British Columbia	Colleen Hannah	6	4
Yukon/Northwest Territories	Michele Cowan	6	4
Prince Edward Island	Angela Roberts	6	4
New Brunswick	Cathy McEwen	6	4
Nova Scotia	Tracy Dobson	5	5
Quebec	Mona Maziade	3	7
Newfoundland	Carla Brett	3	7
Ontario	Nadine Landon	3	7
Saskatchewan	Bonnie McLelland	2	8

=== Results ===
==== Draw 1 ====
Sheet D	1	2	3	4	5	6	7	8	9	10	Final
Yukon/Northwest Territories (Cowan)	0	1	0	0	0	1	0	0	0	3	5
Ontario (Landon)	0	0	1	1	0	0	1	0	0	0	3

Sheet F	1	2	3	4	5	6	7	8	9	10	11	Final
Newfoundland (Brett)	0	0	0	1	0	0	1	1	0	1	0	4
British Columbia (Hannah)	0	0	0	0	2	1	0	0	1	0	1	5

==== Draw 2 ====
Sheet E	1	2	3	4	5	6	7	8	9	10	Final
Quebec (Maziade)	1	0	0	1	0	0	0	0	0	X	2
Alberta (Funk)	0	0	1	0	0	1	1	2	1	X	6

Sheet G	1	2	3	4	5	6	7	8	9	10	Final
New Brunswick (McEwen)	0	1	0	1	0	2	1	1	0	2	8
Manitoba (Lamont)	0	0	2	0	2	0	0	0	2	0	6

==== Draw 3 ====
Sheet A	1	2	3	4	5	6	7	8	9	10	Final
Saskatchewan (McLelland)	2	0	0	0	1	0	1	0	X	X	4
Newfoundland (Brett)	0	2	2	2	0	3	0	2	X	X	11

Sheet B	1	2	3	4	5	6	7	8	9	10	Final
Alberta (Funk)	0	1	0	2	1	0	0	2	2	X	8
Prince Edward Island (Roberts)	1	0	1	0	0	1	2	0	0	X	5

Sheet C	1	2	3	4	5	6	7	8	9	10	Final
British Columbia (Hannah)	0	2	0	2	1	0	2	0	2	X	9
Yukon/Northwest Territories (Cowan)	0	0	3	0	0	0	0	2	0	X	5

Sheet D	1	2	3	4	5	6	7	8	9	10	Final
Manitoba (Lamont)	2	0	0	1	0	1	0	0	2	1	7
Nova Scotia (Dobson)	0	0	2	0	3	0	1	0	0	0	6

==== Draw 4 ====
Sheet E	1	2	3	4	5	6	7	8	9	10	Final
Nova Scotia (Dobson)	0	1	0	0	0	2	0	0	1	1	5
Prince Edward Island (Roberts)	1	0	1	2	1	0	0	2	0	0	7

Sheet F	1	2	3	4	5	6	7	8	9	10	Final
Ontario (Landon)	0	1	2	0	2	0	0	0	0	0	5
New Brunswick (McEwen)	0	0	0	1	0	4	1	0	1	1	8

Sheet G	1	2	3	4	5	6	7	8	9	10	Final
Saskatchewan (McLelland)	0	0	0	1	1	0	0	3	0	X	5
Quebec (Maziade)	3	3	1	0	0	0	1	0	2	X	10

==== Draw 5 ====
Sheet A	1	2	3	4	5	6	7	8	9	10	Final
British Columbia (Hannah)	1	1	0	1	0	1	0	1	0	X	5
Nova Scotia (Dobson)	0	0	2	0	2	0	2	0	2	X	8

Sheet C	1	2	3	4	5	6	7	8	9	10	Final
Saskatchewan (McLelland)	1	1	1	0	0	0	1	0	0	1	5
Manitoba (Lamont)	0	0	0	1	1	1	0	1	0	0	4

Sheet D	1	2	3	4	5	6	7	8	9	10	Final
New Brunswick (McEwen)	1	0	0	1	0	0	1	0	1	2	6
Prince Edward Island (Roberts)	0	2	2	0	0	1	0	3	0	0	8

==== Draw 6 ====
Sheet E	1	2	3	4	5	6	7	8	9	10	Final
Alberta (Funk)	0	2	0	0	0	0	0	1	0	X	3
New Brunswick (McEwen)	2	0	1	1	1	1	1	0	1	X	8

Sheet F	1	2	3	4	5	6	7	8	9	10	Final
Yukon/Northwest Territories (Cowan)	0	1	1	0	0	1	2	2	0	1	8
Quebec (Maziade)	1	0	0	0	2	0	0	0	4	0	7

Sheet G	1	2	3	4	5	6	7	8	9	10	Final
Nova Scotia (Dobson)	3	0	2	0	1	2	0	4	X	X	12
Ontario (Landon)	0	1	0	1	0	0	1	0	X	X	3

Sheet H	1	2	3	4	5	6	7	8	9	10	Final
Prince Edward Island (Roberts)	2	0	0	2	0	0	1	1	2	X	8
Newfoundland (Brett)	0	0	2	0	0	1	0	0	0	X	3

==== Draw 7 ====
Sheet A	1	2	3	4	5	6	7	8	9	10	Final
Quebec (Maziade)	0	0	0	1	0	1	0	3	0	X	5
Newfoundland (Brett)	1	0	2	0	1	0	3	0	1	X	8

Sheet B	1	2	3	4	5	6	7	8	9	10	Final
Manitoba (Lamont)	1	1	0	1	2	0	3	X	X	X	8
Yukon/Northwest Territories (Cowan)	0	0	0	0	0	1	0	X	X	X	1

Sheet C	1	2	3	4	5	6	7	8	9	10	11	Final
Ontario (Landon)	1	0	0	1	0	0	1	0	1	0	1	5
Alberta (Funk)	0	1	1	0	1	0	0	0	0	1	0	4

Sheet D	1	2	3	4	5	6	7	8	9	10	Final
British Columbia (Hannah)	0	0	0	0	0	1	0	1	0	X	2
Saskatchewan (McLelland)	0	1	0	1	0	0	2	0	3	X	7

==== Draw 8 ====
Sheet E	1	2	3	4	5	6	7	8	9	10	Final
Quebec (Maziade)	0	1	1	0	0	1	1	1	0	0	5
Nova Scotia (Dobson)	1	0	0	2	0	0	0	0	3	1	7

Sheet F	1	2	3	4	5	6	7	8	9	10	Final
Alberta (Funk)	2	0	1	2	1	3	X	X	X	X	9
British Columbia (Hannah)	0	2	0	0	0	0	X	X	X	X	2

Sheet G	1	2	3	4	5	6	7	8	9	10	Final
Newfoundland (Brett)	1	0	0	2	0	1	0	1	0	0	5
Ontario (Landon)	0	2	0	0	1	0	2	0	0	4	9

==== Draw 9 ====
Sheet A	1	2	3	4	5	6	7	8	9	10	Final
Ontario (Landon)	1	0	3	0	0	1	0	4	0	X	9
Saskatchewan (McLelland)	0	1	0	1	0	0	2	0	1	X	5

Sheet B	1	2	3	4	5	6	7	8	9	10	Final
New Brunswick (McEwen)	4	0	0	0	2	0	0	0	0	X	6
Quebec (Maziade)	0	1	1	2	0	2	1	1	1	X	9

Sheet C	1	2	3	4	5	6	7	8	9	10	Final
Newfoundland (Brett)	1	0	0	0	0	1	0	X	X	X	2
Manitoba (Lamont)	0	3	0	2	2	0	2	X	X	X	9

Sheet D	1	2	3	4	5	6	7	8	9	10	Final
Yukon/Northwest Territories (Cowan)	0	0	1	2	0	3	0	0	0	3	9
Prince Edward Island (Roberts)	2	1	0	0	1	0	1	0	1	0	6

==== Draw 10 ====
Sheet E	1	2	3	4	5	6	7	8	9	10	Final
Prince Edward Island (Roberts)	0	2	0	4	2	0	1	2	0	X	11
Saskatchewan (McLelland)	2	0	2	0	0	0	0	0	1	X	5

Sheet F	1	2	3	4	5	6	7	8	9	10	Final
Nova Scotia (Dobson)	0	0	0	1	1	0	0	3	1	X	6
Yukon/Northwest Territories (Cowan)	0	3	2	0	0	1	1	0	0	X	7

Sheet G	1	2	3	4	5	6	7	8	9	10	Final
British Columbia (Hannah)	0	0	3	0	1	0	1	1	1	2	9
New Brunswick (McEwen)	1	1	0	3	0	1	0	0	0	0	6

Sheet H	1	2	3	4	5	6	7	8	9	10	Final
Manitoba (Lamont)	3	0	1	0	1	0	0	2	0	X	7
Alberta (Funk)	0	1	0	2	0	0	0	0	1	X	4

==== Draw 11 ====
Sheet A	1	2	3	4	5	6	7	8	9	10	Final
Yukon/Northwest Territories (Cowan)	1	1	0	2	2	1	0	3	X	X	10
New Brunswick (McEwen)	0	0	2	0	0	0	2	0	X	X	4

Sheet B	1	2	3	4	5	6	7	8	9	10	Final
Ontario (Landon)	0	0	0	0	1	1	0	0	X	X	2
British Columbia (Hannah)	1	2	1	2	0	0	1	2	X	X	9

Sheet C	1	2	3	4	5	6	7	8	9	10	Final
Quebec (Maziade)	1	0	0	0	1	0	1	0	1	0	4
Prince Edward Island (Roberts)	0	0	1	0	0	1	0	2	0	5	9

Sheet D	1	2	3	4	5	6	7	8	9	10	11	Final
Saskatchewan (McLelland)	0	1	0	2	0	0	0	0	2	0	0	5
Alberta (Funk)	0	0	1	0	3	0	1	0	0	0	1	6

==== Draw 12 ====
Sheet F	1	2	3	4	5	6	7	8	9	10	Final
Alberta (Funk)	1	2	1	0	0	2	1	3	X	X	10
Newfoundland (Brett)	0	0	0	1	0	0	0	0	X	X	1

Sheet G	1	2	3	4	5	6	7	8	9	10	Final
British Columbia (Hannah)	1	0	2	0	1	0	1	0	1	0	6
Manitoba (Lamont)	0	1	0	1	0	1	0	2	0	2	7

Sheet H	1	2	3	4	5	6	7	8	9	10	Final
Nova Scotia (Dobson)	1	0	4	0	1	0	1	0	1	0	8
New Brunswick (McEwen)	0	2	0	2	0	3	0	1	0	1	9

==== Draw 13 ====
Sheet A	1	2	3	4	5	6	7	8	9	10	Final
Prince Edward Island (Roberts)	2	0	1	0	0	2	0	0	1	X	6
Ontario (Landon)	0	2	0	1	0	0	1	0	0	X	4

Sheet B	1	2	3	4	5	6	7	8	9	10	Final
Newfoundland (Brett)	2	0	0	0	0	1	1	0	0	X	4
Nova Scotia (Dobson)	0	1	2	3	2	0	0	1	1	X	10

Sheet C	1	2	3	4	5	6	7	8	9	10	Final
Saskatchewan (McLelland)	0	2	1	0	0	1	2	0	0	0	6
Yukon/Northwest Territories (Cowan)	1	0	0	1	0	0	0	3	2	1	8

Sheet D	1	2	3	4	5	6	7	8	9	10	Final
Manitoba (Lamont)	0	1	0	2	0	2	0	2	1	X	8
Quebec (Maziade)	1	0	1	0	2	0	1	0	0	X	5

==== Draw 14 ====
Sheet E	1	2	3	4	5	6	7	8	9	10	Final
Newfoundland (Brett)	2	0	1	0	2	3	2	X	X	X	10
Yukon/Northwest Territories (Cowan)	0	1	0	1	0	0	0	X	X	X	2

Sheet F	1	2	3	4	5	6	7	8	9	10	Final
Prince Edward Island (Roberts)	0	3	0	0	0	0	1	1	0	X	5
Manitoba (Lamont)	1	0	3	1	2	0	0	0	3	X	10

Sheet H	1	2	3	4	5	6	7	8	9	10	Final
Nova Scotia (Dobson)	0	0	2	0	4	0	0	2	0	1	9
Saskatchewan (McLelland)	1	1	0	1	0	2	1	0	2	0	8

==== Draw 15 ====
Sheet A	1	2	3	4	5	6	7	8	9	10	11	Final
Yukon/Northwest Territories (Cowan)	0	0	2	0	2	0	0	3	0	1	0	8
Alberta (Funk)	1	1	0	1	0	0	2	0	3	0	1	9

Sheet B	1	2	3	4	5	6	7	8	9	10	Final
New Brunswick (McEwen)	1	0	0	0	0	0	3	1	2	X	7
Saskatchewan (McLelland)	0	0	0	0	0	1	0	0	0	X	1

Sheet C	1	2	3	4	5	6	7	8	9	10	Final
Prince Edward Island (Roberts)	1	0	0	2	0	1	0	0	1	X	5
British Columbia (Hannah)	0	2	1	0	1	0	2	1	0	X	7

Sheet D	1	2	3	4	5	6	7	8	9	10	Final
Ontario (Landon)	0	0	1	0	0	1	1	0	0	X	3
Quebec (Maziade)	1	1	0	1	2	0	0	1	1	X	7

==== Draw 16 ====
Sheet E	1	2	3	4	5	6	7	8	9	10	Final
Manitoba (Lamont)	2	0	2	0	0	1	1	2	X	X	8
Ontario (Landon)	0	1	0	1	1	0	0	0	X	X	3

Sheet F	1	2	3	4	5	6	7	8	9	10	Final
New Brunswick (McEwen)	1	0	1	0	2	1	1	0	3	X	9
Newfoundland (Brett)	0	0	0	1	0	0	0	1	0	X	2

Sheet G	1	2	3	4	5	6	7	8	9	10	Final
Alberta (Funk)	0	0	1	0	1	0	0	0	3	1	6
Nova Scotia (Dobson)	0	1	0	0	0	2	1	1	0	0	5

Sheet H	1	2	3	4	5	6	7	8	9	10	Final
Quebec (Maziade)	0	3	0	0	1	0	1	1	0	X	6
British Columbia (Hannah)	2	0	3	2	0	2	0	0	1	X	10

=== Tiebreakers ===
==== Tiebreaker #1 ====
Sheet D	1	2	3	4	5	6	7	8	9	10	11	Final
British Columbia (Hannah)	0	0	2	0	1	0	2	2	0	0	2	9
New Brunswick (McEwen)	0	2	0	1	0	1	0	0	2	1	0	7

Player percentages
British Columbia		New Brunswick	
Tracy Butt	80%	Tracey Bennett	67%
Lori Atkins	65%	Shelly Danks	82%
Melissa Soligo	67%	Lori Murphy	51%
Colleen Hannah	68%	Cathy McEwen	53%
Total	70%	Total	63%

Sheet F	1	2	3	4	5	6	7	8	9	10	Final
Yukon/Northwest Territories (Cowan)	1	1	0	1	1	0	0	2	0	1	7
Prince Edward Island (Roberts)	0	0	3	0	0	1	1	0	1	0	6

Player percentages
Yukon/Northwest Territories		Prince Edward Island	
Dawn Nolan	88%	Gail MacNeill	65%
Janet Tupper	80%	Anne Dillon	61%
Dawn Moses	81%	Cathy Ann Campbell	68%
Michele Cowan	69%	Angela Roberts	57%
Total	79%	Total	63%

==== Tiebreaker #2 ====
Sheet E	1	2	3	4	5	6	7	8	9	10	Final
British Columbia (Hannah)	4	0	0	1	0	0	0	1	0	0	6
Yukon/Northwest Territories (Cowan)	0	1	1	0	1	1	1	0	1	1	7

Player percentages
British Columbia		Yukon/Northwest Territories	
Tracy Butt	64%	Dawn Nolan	83%
Lori Atkins	71%	Janet Tupper	74%
Melissa Soligo	81%	Dawn Moses	65%
Colleen Hannah	69%	Michele Cowan	74%
Total	71%	Total	74%

=== Playoffs ===
Semifinal		Final
Alberta	9
Yukon/Northwest Territories	8	Manitoba	3
		Alberta	6

==== Semifinal ====
Sheet D	1	2	3	4	5	6	7	8	9	10	11	Final
Alberta (Funk)	0	0	3	0	4	0	0	0	1	0	1	9
Yukon/Northwest Territories (Cowan)	0	0	0	2	0	2	1	1	0	2	0	8

Player percentages
Alberta		Yukon/Northwest Territories	
Laurelle Funk	90%	Dawn Nolan	77%
Cindy Larsen	80%	Shea MacKenzie	75%
Sandy Symyrozum	75%	Dawn Moses	81%
LaDawn Funk	69%	Michele Cowan	89%
Total	78%	Total	80%

==== Final ====
Sheet E	1	2	3	4	5	6	7	8	9	10	Final
Manitoba (Lamont)	1	0	0	1	0	0	0	1	0	X	3
Alberta (Funk)	0	2	1	0	0	1	0	0	2	X	6

Player percentages
Manitoba		Alberta	
Suzanne Pearson	79%	Laurelle Funk	80%
Janine Sigurdson	76%	Cindy Larsen	94%
Margaret Morlock	70%	Sandy Symyrozum	78%
Jennifer Lamont	74%	LaDawn Funk	90%
Total	75%	Total	85%
