= 1989 Canadian Junior Curling Championships =

The 1989 Pepsi Canadian Junior Curling Championships were held March 25 to April 1, 1989 at the Heather Curling Club in Winnipeg, Manitoba.

== Men's ==
=== Teams ===
Province / Territory	Skip	Third	Second	Lead
Prince Edward Island	Sean Ledgerwood	Paul Power	Ian Power	Dean MacDonald
Saskatchewan	Randy Bryden	Troy Robinson	Troy Riche	Mark Zacharias
Manitoba	Lyall Hudson	Greg Romaniuk	Dale Goehring	Rod Guilford
Yukon/Northwest Territories	Jeff MacPheat	Kevin Johnstone	Jim Chapman	Michael Stack
Alberta	James Pahl	Shane Park	Troy Berreth	Jeff Davidson
Ontario	David Allan	Robert Brewer	Noel Herron	Richard Polk
Quebec	Martin Ferland	Michel Ferland	Christian Janvier	Daniel Caron
Nova Scotia	Mike Pace	Paul Pace	Keith Taylor	Kris Granchelli
New Brunswick	Evan Sullivan	Wayne Aubie	John MacNaughton	Jamie Snow
Northern Ontario	Craig Kochan	Mike Desilets	Aaron Skillen	Greg Kawahara
Newfoundland	Scott Antle	Rick Rowsell	Keith Forward	Greg White
British Columbia	Dean Joanisse	David Nantes	Tim Coombes	Jef Pilon

=== Standings ===
Locale	Skip	W	L
Quebec	Martin Ferland	8	3
Saskatchewan	Randy Bryden	7	4
Nova Scotia	Mike Pace	7	4
British Columbia	Dean Joanisse	7	4
Ontario	David Allan	7	4
New Brunswick	Evan Sullivan	6	5
Northern Ontario	Craig Kochan	6	5
Manitoba	Lyall Hudson	5	6
Alberta	James Pahl	4	7
Yukon/Northwest Territories	Jeff MacPheat	4	7
Newfoundland	Scott Antle	4	7
Prince Edward Island	Sean Ledgerwood	1	10

=== Results ===
==== Draw 1 ====
Sheet B	1	2	3	4	5	6	7	8	9	10	11	Final
Quebec (Ferland) 🔨	2	0	0	2	0	2	0	0	0	0	1	7
British Columbia (Joanisse)	0	1	1	0	1	0	0	1	1	1	0	6

Sheet C	1	2	3	4	5	6	7	8	9	10	Final
Nova Scotia (Pace) 🔨	2	0	0	1	0	0	2	0	0	3	8
Prince Edward Island (Ledgerwood)	0	0	2	0	1	1	0	2	0	0	6

Sheet F	1	2	3	4	5	6	7	8	9	10	Final
Northern Ontario (Kochan) 🔨	0	2	2	1	0	1	0	3	X	X	9
Alberta (Pahl)	0	0	0	0	2	0	1	0	X	X	3

==== Draw 2 ====
Sheet A	1	2	3	4	5	6	7	8	9	10	Final
Yukon/Northwest Territories (MacPheat) 🔨	0	1	0	1	0	2	0	0	0	X	4
Saskatchewan (Bryden)	2	0	2	0	0	0	3	1	2	X	10

Sheet D	1	2	3	4	5	6	7	8	9	10	Final
Ontario (Allan) 🔨	0	0	1	0	2	0	2	0	0	1	6
Manitoba (Hudson)	0	1	0	0	0	3	0	0	1	0	5

Sheet E	1	2	3	4	5	6	7	8	9	10	Final
New Brunswick (Sullivan) 🔨	2	2	0	1	1	0	0	0	1	X	7
Newfoundland (Antle)	0	0	1	0	0	0	0	0	0	X	1

==== Draw 3 ====
Sheet A	1	2	3	4	5	6	7	8	9	10	Final
Ontario (Allan) 🔨	0	3	0	2	0	0	1	1	2	X	9
Northern Ontario (Kochan)	1	0	2	0	1	0	0	0	0	X	4

Sheet B	1	2	3	4	5	6	7	8	9	10	Final
Newfoundland (Antle) 🔨	0	0	2	0	2	0	0	1	0	0	5
Quebec (Ferland)	1	1	0	1	0	0	1	0	2	1	7

Sheet C	1	2	3	4	5	6	7	8	9	10	Final
Manitoba (Hudson) 🔨	1	0	2	0	2	0	4	1	X	X	10
British Columbia (Joanisse)	0	1	0	1	0	1	0	0	X	X	3

Sheet D	1	2	3	4	5	6	7	8	9	10	Final
Prince Edward Island (Ledgerwood) 🔨	0	0	0	2	0	0	0	1	0	X	3
Saskatchewan (Bryden)	0	0	0	0	0	2	2	0	3	X	7

Sheet E	1	2	3	4	5	6	7	8	9	10	Final
Alberta (Pahl) 🔨	0	2	0	2	0	0	0	0	1	0	5
New Brunswick (Sullivan)	1	0	2	0	0	2	0	1	0	0	6

Sheet F	1	2	3	4	5	6	7	8	9	10	Final
Nova Scotia (Pace) 🔨	0	0	0	2	0	1	1	0	0	0	4
Yukon/Northwest Territories (MacPheat)	0	0	1	0	1	0	0	0	0	1	3

==== Draw 5 ====
Sheet A	1	2	3	4	5	6	7	8	9	10	Final
New Brunswick (Sullivan) 🔨	2	0	0	1	0	2	0	0	3	1	9
Quebec (Ferland)	0	2	0	0	1	0	2	1	0	0	6

Sheet B	1	2	3	4	5	6	7	8	9	10	Final
British Columbia (Joanisse) 🔨	0	2	1	0	1	2	0	0	1	X	7
Ontario (Allan)	1	0	0	1	0	0	2	0	0	X	4

Sheet C	1	2	3	4	5	6	7	8	9	10	Final
Newfoundland (Antle) 🔨	1	0	1	0	0	2	0	1	0	X	5
Nova Scotia (Pace)	0	2	0	2	2	0	1	0	2	X	9

Sheet D	1	2	3	4	5	6	7	8	9	10	Final
Yukon/Northwest Territories (MacPheat) 🔨	2	0	0	1	0	1	0	1	0	2	7
Alberta (Pahl)	0	1	1	0	2	0	0	0	1	0	5

Sheet E	1	2	3	4	5	6	7	8	9	10	Final
Saskatchewan (Bryden) 🔨	3	0	0	1	0	1	0	2	0	2	9
Northern Ontario (Kochan)	0	2	1	0	1	0	2	0	1	0	7

Sheet F	1	2	3	4	5	6	7	8	9	10	Final
Prince Edward Island (Ledgerwood) 🔨	0	1	0	1	0	1	0	0	X	X	3
Manitoba (Hudson)	3	0	0	0	2	0	0	3	X	X	8

==== Draw 8 ====
Sheet A	1	2	3	4	5	6	7	8	9	10	Final
Newfoundland (Antle) 🔨	1	0	2	0	0	3	0	1	4	X	11
Prince Edward Island (Ledgerwood)	0	1	0	1	1	0	2	0	0	X	5

Sheet B	1	2	3	4	5	6	7	8	9	10	Final
Alberta (Pahl) 🔨	0	2	0	1	1	1	0	2	0	1	8
Manitoba (Hudson)	1	0	3	0	0	0	1	0	0	0	5

Sheet C	1	2	3	4	5	6	7	8	9	10	11	12	Final
Yukon/Northwest Territories (MacPheat) 🔨	0	0	0	1	0	0	0	1	0	3	0	1	6
Northern Ontario (Kochan)	0	0	1	0	3	0	0	0	1	0	0	0	5

Sheet D	1	2	3	4	5	6	7	8	9	10	Final
New Brunswick (Sullivan) 🔨	1	0	0	2	0	0	1	0	3	0	7
British Columbia (Joanisse)	0	0	3	0	1	1	0	1	0	2	8

Sheet E	1	2	3	4	5	6	7	8	9	10	11	Final
Nova Scotia (Pace) 🔨	1	0	0	1	1	0	0	0	1	1	1	6
Ontario (Allan)	0	0	1	0	0	2	1	1	0	0	0	5

Sheet F	1	2	3	4	5	6	7	8	9	10	Final
Saskatchewan (Bryden) 🔨	0	1	0	0	0	0	0	0	2	0	3
Quebec (Ferland)	0	0	1	0	0	0	0	2	0	1	4

==== Draw 10 ====
Sheet A	1	2	3	4	5	6	7	8	9	10	Final
British Columbia (Joanisse) 🔨	0	0	2	2	1	0	0	1	0	1	7
Yukon/Northwest Territories (MacPheat)	2	0	0	0	0	0	2	0	1	0	5

Sheet B	1	2	3	4	5	6	7	8	9	10	Final
Nova Scotia (Pace) 🔨	1	0	1	1	0	2	0	1	0	X	6
Saskatchewan (Bryden)	0	3	0	0	3	0	1	0	2	X	9

Sheet C	1	2	3	4	5	6	7	8	9	10	Final
Prince Edward Island (Ledgerwood) 🔨	3	0	0	0	1	0	2	1	1	X	8
New Brunswick (Sullivan)	0	2	1	1	0	1	0	0	0	X	5

Sheet D	1	2	3	4	5	6	7	8	9	10	Final
Northern Ontario (Kochan) 🔨	2	1	0	1	1	1	0	0	X	X	6
Newfoundland (Antle)	0	0	0	0	0	0	1	0	X	X	1

Sheet E	1	2	3	4	5	6	7	8	9	10	Final
Manitoba (Hudson) 🔨	1	0	0	0	0	2	0	0	2	X	5
Quebec (Ferland)	0	0	2	1	3	0	0	1	0	X	7

Sheet F	1	2	3	4	5	6	7	8	9	10	Final
Alberta (Pahl) 🔨	1	0	0	2	0	2	0	0	0	X	5
Ontario (Allan)	0	1	1	0	2	0	0	3	1	X	8

==== Draw 11 ====
Sheet A	1	2	3	4	5	6	7	8	9	10	Final
Saskatchewan (Bryden) 🔨	1	0	0	1	0	2	1	0	0	0	5
Alberta (Pahl)	0	1	0	0	1	0	0	1	1	0	4

Sheet B	1	2	3	4	5	6	7	8	9	10	Final
New Brunswick (Sullivan) 🔨	2	0	1	0	0	3	0	3	X	X	9
Nova Scotia (Pace)	0	1	0	1	0	0	0	0	X	X	2

Sheet C	1	2	3	4	5	6	7	8	9	10	Final
Quebec (Ferland) 🔨	1	0	0	5	0	0	1	0	0	X	7
Yukon/Northwest Territories (MacPheat)	0	1	0	0	2	0	0	1	0	X	4

Sheet D	1	2	3	4	5	6	7	8	9	10	11	Final
Manitoba (Hudson) 🔨	1	0	0	2	1	0	1	0	0	2	0	7
Northern Ontario (Kochan)	0	2	1	0	0	1	0	3	0	0	1	8

Sheet E	1	2	3	4	5	6	7	8	9	10	Final
Ontario (Allan) 🔨	1	1	0	2	1	0	0	2	0	X	7
Prince Edward Island (Ledgerwood)	0	0	1	0	0	2	0	0	2	X	5

Sheet F	1	2	3	4	5	6	7	8	9	10	Final
Newfoundland (Antle) 🔨	0	0	1	1	2	0	0	0	0	X	4
British Columbia (Joanisse)	1	0	0	0	0	0	1	2	2	X	6

==== Draw 13 ====
Sheet A	1	2	3	4	5	6	7	8	9	10	Final
Nova Scotia (Pace) 🔨	3	0	0	3	0	0	1	0	2	X	9
Manitoba (Hudson)	0	3	1	0	1	0	0	2	0	X	7

Sheet B	1	2	3	4	5	6	7	8	9	10	Final
Yukon/Northwest Territories (MacPheat) 🔨	3	1	0	2	1	0	X	X	X	X	7
Prince Edward Island (Ledgerwood)	0	0	2	0	0	2	X	X	X	X	4

Sheet C	1	2	3	4	5	6	7	8	9	10	Final
Alberta (Pahl) 🔨	2	0	0	1	0	0	0	3	1	X	7
Newfoundland (Antle)	0	0	1	0	1	0	0	0	0	X	2

Sheet D	1	2	3	4	5	6	7	8	9	10	Final
Ontario (Allan) 🔨	0	0	0	1	0	0	0	0	0	X	1
Quebec (Ferland)	1	0	0	0	1	1	0	2	0	X	5

Sheet E	1	2	3	4	5	6	7	8	9	10	Final
British Columbia (Joanisse) 🔨	0	0	0	1	0	1	0	2	0	X	4
Saskatchewan (Bryden)	0	0	2	0	1	0	2	0	1	X	6

Sheet F	1	2	3	4	5	6	7	8	9	10	Final
New Brunswick (Sullivan) 🔨	2	1	0	2	0	3	1	X	X	X	9
Northern Ontario (Kochan)	0	0	2	0	1	0	0	X	X	X	3

==== Draw 15 ====
Sheet A	1	2	3	4	5	6	7	8	9	10	Final
Northern Ontario (Desilets) 🔨	1	0	1	0	1	0	0	1	0	X	4
British Columbia (Joanisse)	0	2	0	2	0	0	2	0	1	X	7

Sheet D	1	2	3	4	5	6	7	8	9	10	Final
Alberta (Pahl) 🔨	3	0	2	0	0	0	0	2	1	X	8
Prince Edward Island (Ledgerwood)	0	1	0	0	1	0	1	0	0	X	3

Sheet F	1	2	3	4	5	6	7	8	9	10	Final
Quebec (Ferland) 🔨	2	1	0	1	0	3	0	0	0	0	7
Nova Scotia (Pace)	0	0	2	0	3	0	1	0	1	1	8

==== Draw 16 ====
Sheet B	1	2	3	4	5	6	7	8	9	10	Final
Saskatchewan (Bryden) 🔨	0	2	0	0	0	0	0	0	0	X	2
Newfoundland (Antle)	0	0	0	1	0	1	1	3	0	X	6

Sheet C	1	2	3	4	5	6	7	8	9	10	11	Final
New Brunswick (Sullivan) 🔨	0	0	0	0	1	1	1	0	0	1	0	4
Ontario (Allan)	1	1	1	1	0	0	0	0	0	0	1	5

Sheet E	1	2	3	4	5	6	7	8	9	10	Final
Yukon/Northwest Territories (MacPheat) 🔨	0	2	0	1	0	0	3	1	1	X	8
Manitoba (Hudson)	0	0	2	0	1	1	0	0	0	X	4

==== Draw 17 ====
Sheet A	1	2	3	4	5	6	7	8	9	10	Final
Nova Scotia (Pace) 🔨	0	1	3	0	0	0	0	1	0	X	5
Alberta (Pahl)	2	0	0	2	0	3	0	0	2	X	9

Sheet C	1	2	3	4	5	6	7	8	9	10	Final
Northern Ontario (Desilets) 🔨	1	0	1	0	4	0	3	1	X	X	10
Quebec (Ferland)	0	2	0	1	0	1	0	0	X	X	4

Sheet E	1	2	3	4	5	6	7	8	9	10	Final
Prince Edward Island (Ledgerwood) 🔨	0	1	0	1	0	0	0	1	0	X	3
British Columbia (Joanisse)	0	0	3	0	2	0	1	0	1	X	7

==== Draw 18 ====
Sheet B	1	2	3	4	5	6	7	8	9	10	Final
Manitoba (Hudson) 🔨	0	2	0	2	0	0	0	1	0	2	7
New Brunswick (Sullivan)	1	0	1	0	1	0	1	0	2	0	6

Sheet D	1	2	3	4	5	6	7	8	9	10	Final
Newfoundland (Antle) 🔨	1	2	2	0	0	0	1	0	0	X	6
Yukon/Northwest Territories (MacPheat)	0	0	0	0	1	0	0	2	1	X	4

Sheet F	1	2	3	4	5	6	7	8	9	10	Final
Ontario (Allan) 🔨	0	0	0	1	1	2	0	0	0	1	5
Saskatchewan (Bryden)	1	0	0	0	0	0	2	0	1	0	4

==== Draw 19 ====
Sheet B	1	2	3	4	5	6	7	8	9	10	Final
Ontario (Allan) 🔨	1	0	1	0	0	2	0	1	1	1	7
Yukon/Northwest Territories (MacPheat)	0	2	0	2	0	0	2	0	0	0	6

Sheet D	1	2	3	4	5	6	7	8	9	10	11	Final
Saskatchewan (Bryden) 🔨	0	0	1	0	0	1	0	0	2	0	1	5
New Brunswick (Sullivan)	0	0	0	1	0	0	0	1	0	2	0	4

Sheet F	1	2	3	4	5	6	7	8	9	10	Final
Manitoba (Hudson) 🔨	0	2	3	0	2	0	1	0	0	X	8
Newfoundland (Antle)	1	0	0	1	0	2	0	1	1	X	6

==== Draw 20 ====
Sheet A	1	2	3	4	5	6	7	8	9	10	Final
Quebec (Ferland) 🔨	3	1	0	0	0	0	1	0	0	1	6
Prince Edward Island (Ledgerwood)	0	0	0	0	2	1	0	2	0	0	5

Sheet C	1	2	3	4	5	6	7	8	9	10	Final
British Columbia (Joanisse) 🔨	0	1	0	0	2	0	1	0	2	X	6
Alberta (Pahl)	0	0	0	1	0	1	0	1	0	X	3

Sheet E	1	2	3	4	5	6	7	8	9	10	Final
Northern Ontario (Desilets) 🔨	2	0	2	0	0	1	0	1	3	X	9
Nova Scotia (Pace)	0	0	0	0	2	0	2	0	0	X	4

==== Draw 21 ====
Sheet A	1	2	3	4	5	6	7	8	9	10	Final
Newfoundland (Antle) 🔨	4	1	3	1	0	2	X	X	X	X	11
Ontario (Allan)	0	0	0	0	1	0	X	X	X	X	1

Sheet C	1	2	3	4	5	6	7	8	9	10	Final
Saskatchewan (Bryden) 🔨	1	0	2	0	0	0	1	0	0	X	4
Manitoba (Hudson)	0	2	0	1	1	0	0	1	1	X	6

Sheet F	1	2	3	4	5	6	7	8	9	10	Final
Yukon/Northwest Territories (MacPheat) 🔨	0	1	1	0	0	0	1	X	X	X	3
New Brunswick (Sullivan)	2	0	0	2	1	2	0	X	X	X	7

==== Draw 22 ====
Sheet B	1	2	3	4	5	6	7	8	9	10	Final
Prince Edward Island (Ledgerwood) 🔨	1	0	0	0	1	0	0	0	X	X	2
Northern Ontario (Desilets)	0	3	1	1	0	0	1	1	X	X	7

Sheet D	1	2	3	4	5	6	7	8	9	10	Final
British Columbia (Joanisse) 🔨	1	0	0	1	0	0	1	1	0	X	4
Nova Scotia (Pace)	0	2	0	0	1	1	0	0	2	X	6

Sheet E	1	2	3	4	5	6	7	8	9	10	Final
Quebec (Ferland) 🔨	0	1	0	1	0	0	1	1	1	X	5
Alberta (Pahl)	0	0	2	0	0	1	0	0	0	X	3

=== Tiebreakers ===
Sheet B	1	2	3	4	5	6	7	8	9	10	Final
Saskatchewan (Bryden) 🔨	0	1	0	1	0	0	0	0	1	X	3
Ontario (Allan)	1	0	2	0	0	1	3	0	0	X	7

Player percentages
Saskatchewan		Ontario	
Mark Zacharias	94%	Richard Polk	64%
Troy Riche	73%	Noel Herron	75%
Troy Robinson	79%	Robert Brewer	82%
Randy Bryden	66%	David Allan	91%
Total	78%	Total	78%

Sheet C	1	2	3	4	5	6	7	8	9	10	11	Final
Nova Scotia (Pace) 🔨	1	0	0	1	0	1	0	0	0	1	0	4
British Columbia (Joanisse)	0	1	1	0	1	0	1	0	0	0	1	5

Player percentages
Nova Scotia		British Columbia	
Chris Granchelli	89%	Jef Pilon	88%
Keith Taylor	91%	Tim Coombes	73%
Paul Pace	89%	David Nantes	81%
Mike Pace	77%	Dean Joanisse	86%
Total	86%	Total	82%

=== Playoffs ===
Semifinal		Final
Ontario	5
British Columbia	6	Quebec	2
		British Columbia	5

==== Semifinal ====
Sheet D	1	2	3	4	5	6	7	8	9	10	Final
Ontario (Allan)	0	0	0	1	1	0	1	0	2	0	5
British Columbia (Joanisse) 🔨	0	0	1	0	0	3	0	1	0	1	6

Player percentages
Ontario		British Columbia	
Richard Polk	81%	Jef Pilon	64%
Noel Herron	91%	Tim Coombes	88%
Robert Brewer	78%	David Nantes	73%
David Allan	81%	Dean Joanisse	76%
Total	83%	Total	75%

==== Final ====
Sheet C	1	2	3	4	5	6	7	8	9	10	Final
Quebec (Ferland) 🔨	0	1	0	0	0	0	1	0	0	X	2
British Columbia (Joanisse)	0	0	1	1	1	0	0	1	1	X	5

Player percentages
Quebec		British Columbia	
Daniel Caron	76%	Jef Pilon	85%
Christian Janvier	66%	Tim Coombes	81%
Michel Ferland	63%	David Nantes	80%
Martin Ferland	74%	Dean Joanisse	88%
Total	70%	Total	83%

== Women's ==
=== Teams ===
Province / Territory	Skip	Third	Second	Lead
Manitoba	Cathy Overton	Tracy Baldwin	Carol Harvey	Tracy Bush
New Brunswick	Lisa Sullivan	Cathy Donald	Tia Toner	Katrina Mulherin
Yukon/Northwest Territories	Michele Cowan	Dawn Moses	Dawn Nolan	Loralee Laberge
Quebec	Mona Maziade	Karen Speagle	Manon Maziade	Caroline Gagne
Newfoundland	Shirley Parsons	Sheryl Dwyer	Paula McLean	Gina Stanley
British Columbia	Judy Wood	Marla Geiger	Susan Auty	Sarah Eden
Alberta	Renee Handfield	Nikki Handfield	Joanne Goudreau	Renee Bussiere
Saskatchewan	Andrea Weppler	Alex Toews	Carla Redekopp	Carla Hruska
Nova Scotia	Judy MacKay	Kathy Lowther	Susan Lowther	Trish MacKay
Prince Edward Island	Shelly Danks	Gail MacNeil	Tricia MacGregor	Sheri Currie
Ontario	Tara Stevenson	Christy Buchan	Melanie Leatham	Robin Lowry

=== Standings ===
Locale	Skip	W	L
Manitoba	Cathy Overton	10	0
British Columbia	Judy Wood	7	3
Alberta	Renee Handfield	7	3
New Brunswick	Lisa Sullivan	6	4
Yukon/Northwest Territories	Michele Cowan	6	4
Ontario	Tara Stevenson	6	4
Quebec	Mona Maziade	3	7
Saskatchewan	Andrea Weppler	3	7
Prince Edward Island	Shelly Danks	3	7
Newfoundland	Shirley Parsons	2	8
Nova Scotia	Judy MacKay	2	8

=== Results ===
==== Draw 1 ====
Sheet A	1	2	3	4	5	6	7	8	9	10	Final
Yukon/Northwest Territories (Cowan) 🔨	0	1	1	2	0	3	4	1	X	X	12
Saskatchewan (Weppler)	1	0	0	0	3	0	0	0	X	X	4

Sheet D	1	2	3	4	5	6	7	8	9	10	Final
Ontario (Stevenson) 🔨	0	0	1	0	0	1	1	0	0	X	3
Manitoba (Overton)	1	1	0	2	2	0	0	0	3	X	9

Sheet E	1	2	3	4	5	6	7	8	9	10	Final
Newfoundland (Parsons) 🔨	0	2	0	0	0	0	0	1	0	2	5
New Brunswick (Sullivan)	0	0	0	1	1	1	1	0	2	0	6

==== Draw 2 ====
Sheet B	1	2	3	4	5	6	7	8	9	10	Final
Quebec (Maziade) 🔨	0	0	2	0	0	1	0	0	2	X	5
British Columbia (Wood)	1	0	0	2	2	0	2	1	0	X	8

Sheet C	1	2	3	4	5	6	7	8	9	10	Final
Nova Scotia (MacKay) 🔨	0	0	0	3	0	0	1	1	0	X	5
Prince Edward Island (Danks)	1	0	2	0	1	2	0	0	2	X	8

==== Draw 4 ====
Sheet B	1	2	3	4	5	6	7	8	9	10	11	Final
Newfoundland (Parsons) 🔨	0	0	1	0	0	0	3	0	0	4	1	9
Quebec (Maziade)	1	1	0	0	1	1	0	3	1	0	0	8

Sheet C	1	2	3	4	5	6	7	8	9	10	Final
British Columbia (Wood) 🔨	0	1	0	2	0	0	0	2	0	0	5
Manitoba (Overton)	0	0	1	0	0	1	2	0	0	2	6

Sheet D	1	2	3	4	5	6	7	8	9	10	Final
Prince Edward Island (Danks) 🔨	0	0	0	1	0	1	1	0	0	3	6
Saskatchewan (Weppler)	0	2	0	0	1	0	0	2	0	0	5

Sheet E	1	2	3	4	5	6	7	8	9	10	Final
Alberta (Handfield) 🔨	0	0	0	1	1	0	0	3	0	X	5
New Brunswick (Sullivan)	1	1	0	0	0	0	1	0	1	X	4

Sheet F	1	2	3	4	5	6	7	8	9	10	Final
Nova Scotia (MacKay) 🔨	3	0	0	0	0	2	0	0	4	0	9
Yukon/Northwest Territories (Cowan)	0	1	1	0	2	0	0	2	0	2	8

==== Draw 6 ====
Sheet A	1	2	3	4	5	6	7	8	9	10	Final
New Brunswick (Sullivan) 🔨	1	0	2	1	0	0	1	0	3	1	9
Quebec (Maziade)	0	1	0	0	1	1	0	2	0	0	5

Sheet B	1	2	3	4	5	6	7	8	9	10	11	Final
British Columbia (Wood) 🔨	2	2	2	0	0	0	0	1	0	0	1	8
Ontario (Stevenson)	0	0	0	1	2	0	1	0	2	1	0	7

Sheet C	1	2	3	4	5	6	7	8	9	10	11	Final
Newfoundland (Parsons) 🔨	0	2	1	0	1	0	3	0	0	1	1	9
Nova Scotia (MacKay)	1	0	0	2	0	4	0	0	1	0	0	8

Sheet D	1	2	3	4	5	6	7	8	9	10	Final
Yukon/Northwest Territories (Cowan) 🔨	5	0	0	1	0	1	1	0	3	0	11
Alberta (Handfield)	0	3	3	0	4	0	0	1	0	3	14

Sheet F	1	2	3	4	5	6	7	8	9	10	Final
Prince Edward Island (Danks) 🔨	1	0	1	1	0	1	0	0	X	X	4
Manitoba (Overton)	0	3	0	0	4	0	1	2	X	X	10

==== Draw 7 ====
Sheet A	1	2	3	4	5	6	7	8	9	10	Final
Prince Edward Island (Danks) 🔨	0	0	1	2	0	3	1	3	X	X	10
Newfoundland (Parsons)	0	0	0	0	1	0	0	0	X	X	1

Sheet B	1	2	3	4	5	6	7	8	9	10	Final
Alberta (Handfield) 🔨	0	1	0	1	0	2	0	X	X	X	4
Manitoba (Overton)	3	0	1	0	3	0	4	X	X	X	11

Sheet D	1	2	3	4	5	6	7	8	9	10	Final
New Brunswick (Sullivan) 🔨	1	0	0	0	0	0	2	0	0	X	3
British Columbia (Wood)	0	0	3	1	1	1	0	2	2	X	10

Sheet E	1	2	3	4	5	6	7	8	9	10	Final
Nova Scotia (MacKay) 🔨	1	0	0	1	0	0	X	X	X	X	2
Ontario (Stevenson)	0	3	0	0	2	5	X	X	X	X	10

Sheet F	1	2	3	4	5	6	7	8	9	10	11	Final
Saskatchewan (Weppler) 🔨	0	0	1	0	0	2	0	0	1	0	1	5
Quebec (Maziade)	0	0	0	0	1	0	0	1	0	2	0	4

==== Draw 9 ====
Sheet A	1	2	3	4	5	6	7	8	9	10	Final
British Columbia (Wood) 🔨	0	1	0	1	0	0	0	1	X	X	3
Yukon/Northwest Territories (Cowan)	2	0	2	0	1	1	2	0	X	X	8

Sheet B	1	2	3	4	5	6	7	8	9	10	Final
Nova Scotia (MacKay) 🔨	1	1	0	1	0	1	0	0	4	X	8
Saskatchewan (Weppler)	0	0	0	0	1	0	1	1	0	X	3

Sheet C	1	2	3	4	5	6	7	8	9	10	Final
Prince Edward Island (Danks) 🔨	2	0	0	0	2	0	2	0	0	0	6
New Brunswick (Sullivan)	0	4	1	1	0	1	0	1	1	1	10

Sheet E	1	2	3	4	5	6	7	8	9	10	Final
Manitoba (Overton) 🔨	2	1	1	0	2	0	3	X	X	X	9
Quebec (Maziade)	0	0	0	1	0	1	0	X	X	X	2

Sheet F	1	2	3	4	5	6	7	8	9	10	Final
Ontario (Stevenson) 🔨	0	2	2	0	1	2	0	3	0	X	10
Alberta (Handfield)	2	0	0	1	0	0	2	0	1	X	6

==== Draw 12 ====
Sheet A	1	2	3	4	5	6	7	8	9	10	Final
Saskatchewan (Weppler) 🔨	0	2	0	0	1	0	2	0	1	0	6
Alberta (Handfield)	0	0	0	1	0	2	0	3	0	3	9

Sheet B	1	2	3	4	5	6	7	8	9	10	Final
New Brunswick (Sullivan) 🔨	2	0	1	0	1	0	1	1	1	1	8
Nova Scotia (MacKay)	0	2	0	1	0	0	0	0	0	0	3

Sheet C	1	2	3	4	5	6	7	8	9	10	Final
Yukon/Northwest Territories (Cowan) 🔨	1	0	0	1	1	1	0	1	0	2	7
Quebec (Maziade)	0	2	2	0	0	0	1	0	1	0	6

Sheet E	1	2	3	4	5	6	7	8	9	10	11	Final
Ontario (Stevenson) 🔨	2	1	0	0	0	0	0	0	1	0	2	6
Prince Edward Island (Danks)	0	0	0	0	0	1	2	0	0	1	0	4

Sheet F	1	2	3	4	5	6	7	8	9	10	Final
British Columbia (Wood) 🔨	0	1	1	0	0	1	0	4	0	X	7
Newfoundland (Parsons)	1	0	0	1	1	0	1	0	1	X	5

==== Draw 14 ====
Sheet A	1	2	3	4	5	6	7	8	9	10	Final
Manitoba (Overton) 🔨	2	0	4	0	0	1	1	0	2	X	10
Nova Scotia (MacKay)	0	2	0	1	1	0	0	1	0	X	5

Sheet B	1	2	3	4	5	6	7	8	9	10	Final
Yukon/Northwest Territories (Cowan) 🔨	3	1	0	2	3	0	2	X	X	X	11
Prince Edward Island (Danks)	0	0	1	0	0	2	0	X	X	X	3

Sheet C	1	2	3	4	5	6	7	8	9	10	Final
Saskatchewan (Weppler) 🔨	1	0	0	0	2	0	2	0	1	X	6
British Columbia (Wood)	0	0	1	1	0	2	0	0	0	X	4

Sheet D	1	2	3	4	5	6	7	8	9	10	Final
Quebec (Maziade) 🔨	2	0	0	2	0	2	0	1	1	X	8
Ontario (Stevenson)	0	0	3	0	1	0	0	0	0	X	4

Sheet E	1	2	3	4	5	6	7	8	9	10	Final
Alberta (Handfield) 🔨	5	0	0	1	0	0	0	2	1	X	9
Newfoundland (Parsons)	0	1	0	0	3	0	1	0	0	X	5

==== Draw 15 ====
Sheet B	1	2	3	4	5	6	7	8	9	10	Final
Saskatchewan (Weppler) 🔨	1	0	1	0	3	1	1	0	2	X	9
Newfoundland (Parsons)	0	1	0	1	0	0	0	2	0	X	4

Sheet C	1	2	3	4	5	6	7	8	9	10	Final
New Brunswick (Sullivan) 🔨	1	0	0	1	0	1	0	0	1	2	6
Ontario (Stevenson)	0	0	1	0	2	0	1	0	0	0	4

Sheet E	1	2	3	4	5	6	7	8	9	10	Final
Manitoba (Overton) 🔨	0	0	1	0	5	0	2	2	0	X	10
Yukon/Northwest Territories (Cowan)	1	0	0	2	0	2	0	0	2	X	7

==== Draw 16 ====
Sheet D	1	2	3	4	5	6	7	8	9	10	Final
Alberta (Handfield) 🔨	1	1	0	3	0	1	0	0	0	X	6
Prince Edward Island (Danks)	0	0	1	0	1	0	0	2	0	X	4

Sheet F	1	2	3	4	5	6	7	8	9	10	Final
Quebec (Maziade) 🔨	1	1	0	4	0	2	0	1	X	X	9
Nova Scotia (MacKay)	0	0	0	0	2	0	1	0	X	X	3

==== Draw 17 ====
Sheet B	1	2	3	4	5	6	7	8	9	10	11	12	Final
Manitoba (Overton) 🔨	0	0	0	1	0	1	0	1	0	0	0	3	6
New Brunswick (Sullivan)	0	0	0	0	2	0	0	0	0	1	0	0	3

Sheet D	1	2	3	4	5	6	7	8	9	10	Final
Newfoundland (Parsons) 🔨	1	0	0	1	1	0	0	0	0	X	3
Yukon/Northwest Territories (Cowan)	0	2	2	0	0	0	1	2	2	X	9

Sheet F	1	2	3	4	5	6	7	8	9	10	Final
Ontario (Stevenson) 🔨	1	1	1	2	0	3	1	X	X	X	9
Saskatchewan (Weppler)	0	0	0	0	1	0	0	X	X	X	1

==== Draw 18 ====
Sheet A	1	2	3	4	5	6	7	8	9	10	Final
Alberta (Handfield) 🔨	2	0	0	0	1	1	1	0	2	X	7
Nova Scotia (MacKay)	0	2	0	0	0	0	0	2	0	X	4

Sheet E	1	2	3	4	5	6	7	8	9	10	Final
Prince Edward Island (Danks) 🔨	1	1	3	0	1	0	0	0	0	X	6
British Columbia (Wood)	0	0	0	3	0	1	2	3	2	X	11

==== Draw 19 ====
Sheet A	1	2	3	4	5	6	7	8	9	10	Final
Quebec (Maziade) 🔨	0	0	0	1	2	0	2	0	2	X	7
Prince Edward Island (Danks)	0	1	0	0	0	1	0	1	0	X	3

Sheet C	1	2	3	4	5	6	7	8	9	10	Final
British Columbia (Wood) 🔨	0	2	0	0	0	1	1	1	0	2	7
Alberta (Handfield)	0	0	2	1	1	0	0	0	2	0	6

==== Draw 20 ====
Sheet B	1	2	3	4	5	6	7	8	9	10	Final
Ontario (Stevenson) 🔨	1	0	0	0	2	0	2	0	2	1	8
Yukon/Northwest Territories (Cowan)	0	2	0	1	0	1	0	1	0	0	5

Sheet D	1	2	3	4	5	6	7	8	9	10	Final
New Brunswick (Sullivan) 🔨	3	0	2	0	1	0	1	0	2	X	9
Saskatchewan (Weppler)	0	1	0	1	0	1	0	1	0	X	4

Sheet F	1	2	3	4	5	6	7	8	9	10	Final
Manitoba (Overton) 🔨	3	0	3	0	1	2	X	X	X	X	9
Newfoundland (Parsons)	0	0	0	1	0	0	X	X	X	X	1

==== Draw 21 ====
Sheet D	1	2	3	4	5	6	7	8	9	10	Final
Nova Scotia (MacKay) 🔨	0	0	0	0	1	0	X	X	X	X	1
British Columbia (Wood)	3	1	2	3	0	1	X	X	X	X	10

Sheet E	1	2	3	4	5	6	7	8	9	10	Final
Quebec (Maziade) 🔨	0	3	0	0	0	0	1	0	1	0	5
Alberta (Handfield)	0	0	0	1	1	1	0	1	0	2	6

==== Draw 22 ====
Sheet A	1	2	3	4	5	6	7	8	9	10	Final
Newfoundland (Parsons) 🔨	2	0	0	1	0	0	1	0	0	X	4
Ontario (Stevenson)	0	0	3	0	2	0	0	0	2	X	7

Sheet C	1	2	3	4	5	6	7	8	9	10	Final
Saskatchewan (Weppler) 🔨	0	1	0	1	0	2	2	0	1	X	7
Manitoba (Overton)	2	0	1	0	2	0	0	3	0	X	8

Sheet F	1	2	3	4	5	6	7	8	9	10	11	Final
Yukon/Northwest Territories (Cowan) 🔨	1	0	0	0	0	1	0	1	0	1	1	5
New Brunswick (Sullivan)	0	1	0	1	0	0	1	0	1	0	0	4

=== Playoffs ===
Semifinal		Final
Alberta	2
British Columbia	7	British Columbia	1
		Manitoba	8

==== Semifinal ====
Sheet C	1	2	3	4	5	6	7	8	9	10	Final
Alberta (Handfield) 🔨	0	0	0	2	0	0	0	0	0	X	2
British Columbia (Wood)	0	0	0	0	2	1	1	1	2	X	7

Player percentages
Alberta		British Columbia	
Renee Bussiere	76%	Sarah Eden	78%
Joanne Goudreau	71%	Susan Auty	68%
Nikki Handfield	47%	Marla Geiger	61%
Renee Handfield	52%	Judy Wood	75%
Total	62%	Total	70%

==== Final ====
Sheet D	1	2	3	4	5	6	7	8	9	10	Final
British Columbia (Wood)	0	0	0	0	0	0	1	0	X	X	1
Manitoba (Overton) 🔨	0	0	1	3	2	1	0	1	X	X	8

Player percentages
British Columbia		Manitoba	
Sarah Eden	67%	Tracy Bush	70%
Susan Auty	70%	Carol Harvey	61%
Marla Geiger	56%	Tracy Baldwin	86%
Judy Wood	53%	Cathy Overton	65%
Total	62%	Total	70%
