= Craig Kochan =

Canadian curler

- Curler
- Born: October 18, 1969 (age 57); Marathon, Ontario

Team
- Curling club: Whitehorse CC; Whitehorse, YT

Curling career
- Member Association: Northern Ontario (1986–1995; 2009–2010); Ontario (1998–2009; 2010–2015); Yukon (2016–2018)
- Brier: 1 (2017)

Craig Kochan (born October 18, 1969 in Marathon, Ontario, Canada) is a Canadian curler from Toronto. He has played competitively in both Northern and southern Ontario and in the Yukon. As of 2019, he has won three Northern Ontario junior titles, the Yukon men's championship, a Northern Ontario mixed title and has played in seven Ontario provincial championships, two Northern Ontario provincial championships and two Yukon championships.

== Career ==
=== Juniors ===
Kochan's junior career involved winning the Northern Ontario junior title three years straight in 1987, 1988 and 1989. This qualified him to represent Northern Ontario at the Canadian Junior Curling Championships each of those years. At the 1987 Canadian Juniors, Kochan and his rink of Craig Cordiner, Andy Davis and Mike Desilets finished the round robin with a 6-5 record, missing the playoffs. The Kapuskasing four-some returned to the Canadian Juniors in 1988 and this time finished the round robin with a 9-2 record, in first place. In the final they played against British Columbia's Mike Wood, and lost 6-2. At the 1989 Canadian Juniors, Cordiner and Davis were replaced by Greg Kawahara and Aaron Skillen and they curled out of Thunder Bay, Ontario. Kochan did not fare as well with this new line up, and once again finished 6-5, out of the playoffs.

=== Provincial & territorial playdowns ===
After his junior career, Kochan has played in provincial playdowns both in Northern and southern Ontario, but has yet to win a provincial men's title in either region. The closest he came to winning was at the 1995 Northern Ontario finals where he lost to Al Hackner. He did win the Northern Ontario mixed title in 2011, and skipped the Northern Ontario team (which also included Liz Kingston, Colin Koivula and Alissa Begin) to a 4-7 finish at the 2011 Canadian Mixed Curling Championship.

In 2016, Kochan joined the Whitehorse, Yukon-based Jon Solberg rink at third position. The team would win the 2017 Yukon Men's Curling Championship, sending Kochan to his first Brier. There, the team was eliminated in the prequalifying final.

== Personal life ==
Kochan is employed as the president of My Advisors Inc.
