= 2017 Yukon Men's Curling Championship =

- Host city: Whitehorse, Yukon
- Arena: Whitehorse Curling Club
- Dates: January 8–15, 2017
- Winner: Jon Solberg
- Curling club: Whitehorse Curling Club
- Skip: Jon Solberg
- Third: Craig Kochan
- Second: Ray Mikkelsen
- Lead: Darrin Fredrickson
- Finalist: Brent Pierce

The 2017 Yukon Men's Curling Championship was held January 12 to 15 at the Whitehorse Curling Club in Whitehorse, Yukon. The winning Jon Solberg team represented the Yukon at the 2017 Tim Hortons Brier, Canada's national men's curling championship.

== Teams ==
Seven teams entered the event:

Skip	Third	Second	Lead
Herb Balsam	Alexander Peech	Cole Hume	Wes Huston
Dustin Mikkelsen	Scott Williamson	Branden Hayen	Scott Cole
Pat Paslawski	Terry Miller	Tyler Williams	Trent Derkatch
Brent Pierce	Wade Scoffin	Steve Fecteau	Clint Ireland
Bob Smallwood	Clint Abel	Scott Odian	David Rach
Jon Solberg	Craig Kochan	Ray Mikkelsen	Darrin Fredrickson
Gord Zealand	Dale Enzenauer	Don Duncan	Bob Walker

== Draw ==
Following new rules set out by the Yukon Curling Association, championships with 6-7 teams are to have a modified triple knock out format.

Brackets:

A Qualifier		Semifinals		A Final
		Bob Smallwood	7
Pat Paslawski	6	Pat Paslawski	6
Dustin Mikkelsen	5			Bob Smallwood	5
Jon Solberg	9			Brent Pierce	6
Herb Balsam	2	Jon Solberg	3
		Brent Pierce	6

B Qualifier
Herb Balsam	9
Gord Zealand	7

Quarterfinals
Dustin Mikkelsen	2
Jon Solberg	8
Pat Paslawski	9
Herb Balsam	4

Semifinals
Bob Smallwood	9
Jon Solberg	14
Brent Pierce	9
Pat Paslawski	6

B Final
Jon Solberg	7
Brent Pierce	5

C Qualifier
Dustin Mikkelsen	6
Gord Zealand	7

Quarterfinals
Herb Balsam	1
Pat Paslawski	8
Bob Smallwood	8
Gord Zealand	5

Semifinals
Jon Solberg	8
Pat Paslawski	3
Brent Pierce	7
Bob Smallwood	3

C Final
Jon Solberg	4
Brent Pierce	8

== Playoffs ==
Pierce had to be beaten twice

Semifinal			Final
			A	Brent Pierce	6
B	Jon Solberg	11	B	Jon Solberg	7
C	Brent Pierce	5

=== Game #1 ===
Sunday, January 16, 9:00 am

Sheet 4	1	2	3	4	5	6	7	8	9	10	Final
Jon Solberg	2	0	1	0	3	3	0	1	1	X	11
Brent Pierce	0	1	0	1	0	0	3	0	0	X	5

=== Game #2 ===
Sunday, January 16, 3:00 pm

Sheet 5	1	2	3	4	5	6	7	8	9	10	Final
Jon Solberg	2	1	0	1	0	1	0	1	0	1	7
Brent Pierce	0	0	1	0	3	0	0	0	2	0	6
