= Garth Smith (curler) =

Canadian curler

- Curler ♂
- Born: May 18, 1969 (age 57); Winnipeg, Manitoba

Team
- Curling club: Assiniboine Memorial CC, Winnipeg, MB, Charleswood CC, Winnipeg, MB

Curling career
- Member Association: Manitoba
- Brier: 4: (2008, 2011, 2013, 2014)
- World Championship: 1 (2011)
Medal record
Curling
Representing Canada
World Championships
Gold medal – first place	2011 Regina
Representing Manitoba
Tim Hortons Brier
Gold medal – first place	2011 London
Silver medal – second place	2013 Edmonton
Bronze medal – third place	2014 Kamloops

Garth Smith (born May 18, 1969) is a Canadian curler.

He is a 2011 World Men's champion and a 2011 Tim Hortons Brier champion.

== Teams ==
Season	Skip	Third	Second	Lead	Alternate	Coach	!Events
1986–87	Brent Braemer	Kyle Thompsett	Myles Riddell	Garth Smith			CJCC 1987 (6th)
1987–88	Brent Braemer	Kyle Thompsett	Myles Riddell	Garth Smith			CJCC 1988 (6th)
1996–97	Barry Fry	Garth Smith	Ross McFayden	Derrick Mason			
1998–98	Barry Fry	Ryan Fry	Garth Smith	Scott Grant			
1999–00	Larry Knowles	Garth Smith	Kyle Thompsett	Gary Bonham			
2005–06	Rob Johnson	Garth Smith	Duane Grierson	Bob Genoway			
2006–07	Mike Harris	Garth Smith	Jim Bush	Bob Genoway			
2007–08	Kerry Burtnyk	Dan Kammerlock	Richard Daneault	Garth Smith	Reid Carruthers	Rob Meakin	Brier 2008 (6th)
2008–09	Kerry Burtnyk	Don Walchuk	Richard Daneault	Garth Smith			
2009–10	Kerry Burtnyk	Don Walchuk	Richard Daneault	Garth Smith			
2010–11	Garth Smith	Ken Tresoor	Ross McFayden	Myles Riddell			
2010–11	Jeff Stoughton	Jon Mead	Reid Carruthers	Steve Gould	Garth Smith	Norm Gould	Brier 2011 (gold); WCC 2011 (gold)
2012–13	Jeff Stoughton	Jon Mead	Reid Carruthers	Mark Nichols	Garth Smith	Rob Meakin	Brier 2013 (silver)
2013–14	Jeff Stoughton	Jon Mead	Mark Nichols	Reid Carruthers	Garth Smith	Rob Meakin	COCT 2013 (5th); Brier 2014 (bronze)

== Personal life ==
Smith attended John Taylor Collegiate and the University of Manitoba. He is the President of Momentum Dietary Solutions. He was born in and resides in Winnipeg, but lived in Calgary from roughly 1997 to 2007.

In addition to curling, Smith was the member of the Manitoba Junior Men's Baseball Championship team.
